= McLaughlin v. Pulaski County Special School District =

2003 civil rights lawsuit in the United States

McLaughlin v. Pulaski County Special School District was a 2003 civil rights lawsuit filed by the American Civil Liberties Union (ACLU) on behalf of Thomas McLaughlin, a 14-year-old student at Jacksonville High School in Pulaski County, Arkansas. The case centered on the constitutional rights of LGBTQ+ students in public schools, specifically addressing forced outing by school officials, administrative harassment, and the non-consensual imposition of religious materials as a disciplinary measure. The lawsuit resulted in an out-of-court settlement that mandated systemic, district-wide policy reforms explicitly protecting students from discrimination and harassment based on sexual orientation throughout the Pulaski County Special School District.

== Incident and forced outing ==
In 2002, Thomas McLaughlin, an eighth-grade student at Jacksonville Junior High School, was overheard by a science teacher that he refused to deny that he was gay during a conversation with his friends. Then he was forced to disclose his sexual orientation to his parents, which also led to his teacher drafting a four-page letter to him condemning his sexual orientation on religious grounds. At the end, the principal of the school outed him to his parents without his consent.

Following the outing, McLaughlin faced escalating harassment. In January 2003, he received discriminatory punishment for discussing a "cute boy" with a female classmate, who faced no consequences. School officials also forced him to read the Bible as a disciplinary measure, called his identity "sickening," and banned him from discussing the punishment. When he told a classmate anyway, the school suspended him for two days and threatened him with expulsion if he spoke of it again. In response, the ACLU issued a demand letter giving officials until March 21 to cease these violations and clear his record, or face a federal lawsuit.

== Lawsuit ==
In April 2003, the ACLU filed a federal civil rights lawsuit, McLaughlin ex rel. McLaughlin v. Board of Education of the Pulaski County Special School District, in the United States District Court for the Eastern District of Arkansas . The suit argued that the administration violated McLaughlin's constitutional rights under federal law. First, it violated his First Amendment rights under the Establishment Clause through forced Bible reading as punishment, and under the Free Speech Clause by suspending him for discussing his reason of punishment with his classmate. It also referencing precedents like Tinker v. Des Moines. Second, it violated the Fourteenth Amendment's Equal Protection Clause through discriminatory treatment based on his sexual orientation. Finally, the lawsuit argued that school authorities violated his constitutional right to privacy by forcibly disclosing his sexual orientation to his parents.

== Settlement and impact ==
In July 2003, the Pulaski County Special School District settled a federal lawsuit with the McLaughlin family out of court. Under the agreement, the district paid $25,000 in damages and attorney fees, issued a formal apology, and expunged Thomas McLaughlin's disciplinary record. The settlement terms explicitly prohibited school staff from disclosing any student’s sexual orientation, preaching to students, or punishing them for discussing their sexual orientation or receiving discipline during non-instructional time. McLaughlin did not return to the district, as his family relocated to Louisiana for unrelated reasons.
