= Mills University Studies High School =

Public school in Sweet Home, Arkansas, US

Wilbur D. Mills University Studies High School

Location
- 708 E. Dixon Road; Little Rock, Arkansas postal address, Arkansas 72206; United States; 34°40′23″N 92°15′10″W

Information
- Type: Comprehensive Public High School with University Studies Scholars Program
- Established: 25 August 1969 (57 years ago)
- School district: Pulaski County Special School District
- NCES District ID: 0511850
- CEEB code: 042390
- NCES School ID: 051185000945
- Principal: Damian Patterson
- Faculty: 49.17 (on full time equivalent (FTE) basis)
- Grades: 9–12
- Enrollment: 568 (2021-2022)
- Student to teacher ratio: 12.16
- Education system: Smart Core curriculum
- Campus type: Suburban
- Colors: Green, gold, black
- Slogan: Look at us, Mills High!
- Athletics conference: 5A Central
- Sports: Baseball, basketball (boys and girls), competitive cheer, dance, football, golf (boys and girls), soccer (boys and girls), softball, track and field (boys and girls), volleyball,
- Team name: Comets
- Yearbook: The Comet
- Affiliations: Arkansas Activities Association
- Television Network: Comet TV
- Website: mills.pcssd.org

Mills University Studies High School is a secondary school in Sweet Home, Arkansas (with a Little Rock postal address), is one of six high schools within the Pulaski County Special School District. The school opened on August 25, 1969, and is named after the late Congressman Wilbur Daigh Mills. While drawing students from around its home area, Mills also contains a hybrid Gifted & Talented magnet school focusing on college preparation through Advanced Placement courses.

Its attendance area includes the city of Wrightsville, sections of Little Rock, a portion of Shannon Hills, and the census-designated places of Sweet Home, College Station, Landmark, Hensley, Scott, Woodson, as well as a portion of McAlmont CDP, and the unincorporated community of Ironton.

== Academics ==
The assumed course of study for students follow the Smart Core curriculum developed by the Arkansas Department of Education (ADE) with an emphasis on preparing students for "university studies" and college readiness. Students complete regular (core and career focus) courses and exams and may select from 36 Advanced Placement (AP) courses and exams that provide an opportunity for college credit.

Mills is accredited by the ADE and has accredited by AdvancED (formerly North Central Association) since 1962.

=== Awards and recognition ===
From 2017-2020, Mills University Studies was named to be among the top 100 best high schools in the nation according to the Newsweek magazine's Top 1300 US Schools. In the 2011 and 2012 Washington Post's The High School Challenge Index, Mills was ranked 303 and 424, respectively, compared to more than 1900 schools for this ranking system.

== Athletics ==
The Mills High School mascot and athletic emblem is the Comet with green, gold and black serving as its school colors.

For 2016-18, the Mills Comets competed in the 5A Classification within the 5A Central conference as sanctioned by the Arkansas Activities Association. The Comets participate in football, soccer (boys/girls), volleyball, golf (boys), basketball (boys/girls), baseball, softball, competitive cheer, dance, and track and field (boys/girls). The 5A Central conference includes John L. McClellan, Pulaski Academy, Beebe, J.A. Fair High School, Little Rock Christian Academy, Little Rock Parkview, and Sylvan Hills.

From 2008–12, the Mills Comets competed in the Class 5A-Southeast conference with Sylvan Hills Bears, West Helena Central, Watson Chapel, Monticello Billies, Crossett Eagles, White Hall Bulldogs, and North Pulaski Falcons. From 2012-14, Mills competed in the 5A Central conference with Sylvan Hills, West Helena Central, North Pulaski, John L. McClellan, Little Rock Christian, Pulaski Academy, and Jacksonville.

The Mills Comets have won three state baseball championships (1975, 1990, 1999), five state boys basketball titles (2004, 2017, 2020, 2021, 2025), a state weightlifting title (1996), four bowling state titles, and two tennis state titles. The Comets have won multiple conference championships across all sports, most notably boys basketball. During the 2000s, the Comets won seven conference championships in basketball, and appeared in the state championship twice under the direction of Coach Tracy Allen. The first basketball state championship was won on March 12, 2004, as Allen's Comets beat the Sylvan Hills Bears 58-53 at Alltel Arena in North Little Rock.

In 2011, Raymond Cooper took the reins of the basketball program. On March 10, 2012, Mills would appear in the 5A State Championship game in Cooper's first year as head coach, eventually losing to the Sylvan Hills Bears 59-54. The Comets finished the 2011-12 season with a record of 22-7. Almost 5 years later, on March 9, 2017, the Comets defeated the Little Rock Parkview Patriots 65-61 to earn the school's second state title in a season that saw them set new records for the longest winning streak in program history (22) and the most wins in school history (31).

The Comet boys basketball team returned to the state championship in 2018, losing to Little Rock Parkview. In 2019, they made yet another appearance in the state championship game, losing to Magnolia in overtime. The next year, the Comets shared the class 4A title with Magnolia, having the state title game cancelled due to the COVID-19 pandemic. In 2021, the Comets made a fifth consecutive appearance in the championship game, beating Morrilton 49-46 to earn the school's fourth state title.

In the fall of 2024, the Comet football team had the most successful season in school history, winning its first conference championship in 36 years and advancing to the semi-finals of the state playoffs.

In 2025, the Comet boys basketball team won conference and regional championships, and capped off their season with a 56-51 victory in the Class 4A State Championship game against Morrilton. The team finished with a record of 35-1, the best record in school history.

== Notable alumni ==
- David Kerr (Class of 2002), baseball executive, General Manager of Mississippi Mud Monsters
- Kris Allen (Class of 2003)-Musician; American Idol Winner
- Marcus Harrison (Class of 2003)-Former American football player (defensive lineman); Chicago Bears
- Kevin Cross Jr. (Class of 2019)-basketball player
