= Jacksonville High School (Arkansas) =

Location
- 1301 W. Main St; Jacksonville, Arkansas; United States
- Coordinates: 34°53′17″N 92°6′2″W

Information
- Type: Public high school
- School district: Jacksonville North Pulaski School District (2016-); Pulaski County Special School District (-2016)
- NCES District ID: 0500419
- CEEB code: 041225
- NCES School ID: 050041900919
- Principal: Katrina Mimms
- Teaching staff: 105.31 (FTE)
- Grades: 9–12
- Enrollment: 1,165 (2023-2024)
- Student to teacher ratio: 11.06
- Colors: Red and gold
- Athletics conference: 5A EAST
- Team name: Red Devils, Lady Red Devils (former); Titans, Lady Titans (current)
- Communities served: Jacksonville, Little Rock Air Force Base, and surrounding areas
- Website: www.jnpsd.org/o/jhs

Jacksonville High School (JHS) is a secondary public school located in Jacksonville, Arkansas for students in grades nine through twelve. JHS serves students in the Jacksonville and McAlmont communities and is administered by the Jacksonville North Pulaski School District (JNPSD). The school was previously in the Pulaski County Special School District.

== History ==
On May 18, 1907, the Jacksonville Special School District was formed and remained in existence until 1927 when the Pulaski County Special School District consolidated the county's school districts except North Little Rock and Little Rock school districts.

Jacksonville High School's primary rival school is North Pulaski High School, Jacksonville's other secondary school which is located on the west side of the city. Jacksonville is home to Little Rock Air Force Base, featuring one squadron known as the 50th Airlift Squadron Red Devils, perhaps the inspiration for the school mascot of Jacksonville High School. Maybe the reverse is true, as the JHS sports teams went by the name "Red Devils" many years before the 50th Airlift Squadron was located to LRAFB in 1973 and as the 50th Airlift Squadron had different squadron insignia during WWII & the Korean War.

In 2007, Jacksonville requested to become separated from the PCSSD and form its own school district.

In 2014, the people of Jacksonville voted to break away from Pulaski County Special School District, and form their own school district. An interim school board should be named this fall.

In 2019 demolition of the former high school building began.

== Academics ==
The assumed course of study for students follows the Smart Core curriculum developed by the Arkansas Department of Education (ADE). Students complete regular (core and career focus) courses and exams and may select Advanced Placement (AP) coursework and exams with the possibility to receive college credit.

As of the beginning of the 2014–15 school year, the school is currently in year 11 of school improvement and is utilizing the national transformation model for school improvement in efforts to spark student achievement. As part of the transformation model requirements, Jacksonville High School brought in administrators with track records of school improvement with the intention of turning the school around. In addition, the school was granted $5.7 million in a technology grant that has provided the school with interactive whiteboards, student response systems, laptops or tablets, and other classroom technologies for educational use in order to improve student achievement at Jacksonville High School. Furthermore, teachers at Jacksonville High School are being offered extensive professional development and training as part of school improvement. Professional development is centered around literacy and mathematics and is provided through programs such as Advanced Placement training through the AP College Board, Laying the Foundation, and the Literacy and Mathematics Design Collaborative. However, with the advancement of Common Core curriculum and PARCC testing, teachers in all subject disciplines are able to receive training, often at no cost to themselves. The school is currently ranked as the 5th worst school in the state due to low test scores on major end-of-course examinations for Literacy, Algebra I and II, Geometry, and Biology.

Currently part of the highly troubled Pulaski County Special School District, Jacksonville High School may experience more autonomy in its future, as residents in Jacksonville voted to separate from the district in order to form a unitary and autonomous Jacksonville school district. Previously, the district's involvement in a desegregation lawsuit hindered progress to this end, but a judge has since ruled that the district and other districts involved in the initial lawsuit are released from desegregation penalties. The new Jacksonville North Pulaski School District is expected to be full force by the 2016–2017 school year.

== Athletics ==
In 2013, the boys and girls basketball teams each won the 5A classification state basketball championship.

Home football games are played at Jan Crow Stadium located on the campus, which is named for the former team doctor.].

=== State championships ===
The Red Devils and Lady Red Devils have won 13 state championship titles in school history:

- Arkansas State Football Champions: 1976, 1978, 1981
- Arkansas State Girls Golf Champions: 1994, 1995, 1996
- Arkansas State Boys Basketball Champions: Class 6A - 2009 (Jacksonville-63, LR Hall-62); Class 5A - 2013 (Jacksonville-56, Alma-53)
- Arkansas State Girls Basketball Champions: Class 5A - 2013 (Jacksonville-54, Paragould-43)
- Arkansas State Boys Track and Field Champions: 1970, 1982
- Arkansas State Baseball Champions: 1987, 2011

== Notable alumni ==
The following are notable people associated with Jacksonville High School. If the person was a Jacksonville High School student, the number in parentheses indicates the year of graduation; if the person was a faculty or staff member, that person's title and years of association are included:

- Tyree Appleby (2017), professional basketball player
- Lisa Blount (1975)—Actress and Academy Award—winning producer
- Davonte Davis (2020)-Basketball player
- Dan Hampton (1975)—Pro Football Hall of Fame defensive end
- Allen Kerr (1974)—Member since 2009 of the Arkansas House of Representatives from District 32 in Pulaski County
- Clinton McDonald (2005)—NFL player for the 2014 Super Bowl Champions Seattle Seahawks - defensive tackle
- Ariana Miyamoto – Miss Universe Japan 2015
- Robert Thomas (1993)—Former NFL player (Dallas Cowboys) - fullback
