= Davonte Davis =

American basketball player (born 2001)

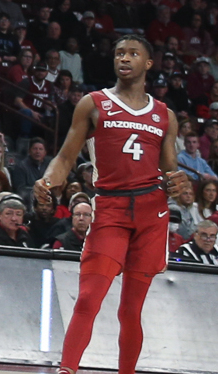
- Davis with Arkansas in 2023

No. 0 – Panteras de Miranda
- Position: Point guard / shooting guard
- League: Superliga Profesional de Baloncesto

Personal information
- Born: September 24, 2001 (age 25) Jacksonville, Arkansas, U.S.
- Listed height: 6 ft 4 in (1.93 m)
- Listed weight: 185 lb (84 kg)

Career information
- High school: Jacksonville Lighthouse (Jacksonville, Arkansas); Jacksonville (Jacksonville, Arkansas)
- College: Arkansas (2020–2024); Oklahoma State (2024–2025)

Davonte "Devo" Davis (born September 24, 2001) is an American professional basketball player for the Panteras de Miranda of the Superliga Profesional de Baloncesto.

== High school career ==
As a freshman at Jacksonville Lighthouse School in his hometown of Jacksonville, Arkansas, Davis averaged 16 points and seven rebounds per game, leading his team to a regional championship and the Class 2A state semifinal. In his sophomore season, he averaged 18.4 points, eight assists, seven rebounds and two steals per game. For his junior season, Davis transferred to Jacksonville High School in Jacksonville. He averaged 18.5 points, six assists and 5.3 rebounds per game as a junior. As a senior, Davis averaged 21 points, 10 rebounds, eight assists and three steals per game, helping his team reach the Class 5A state title game, which was canceled due to the COVID-19 pandemic. As a result of the cancellation, Jacksonville was awarded a share of the 6A state championship along with West Memphis High. Davis was named Arkansas Democrat-Gazette Player of the Year. Davis played for Woodz Elite in the Nike Elite Youth Basketball League circuit. He was regarded as a four-star prospect rated 80th on the ESPN Top 100 and 100th on the 247Sports Composite. He first committed to playing college basketball for Oklahoma State before switching his commitment to Arkansas.

== College career ==
On January 9, 2021, Davis recorded a freshman season-high 20 points, seven rebounds and six assists for Arkansas in a 99–69 win against Georgia. On March 27, he posted 16 points and eight rebounds, including the game-winning shot with 3.1 seconds remaining, in a 72–70 victory over Oral Roberts at the Sweet 16 of the NCAA tournament. As a freshman, Davis averaged 8.5 points, 4.5 rebounds and 2.1 assists per game. He averaged 8.3 points, 3.7 rebounds and 2.8 assists per game as a sophomore, mostly serving as the team's sixth man. Davis has helped return Razorback basketball back to national prominence, as Arkansas made the Elite Eight in 2021 and 2022, and made the Sweet Sixteen in 2023. Davis was named to the SEC All-Defensive Team in 2023. After declaring for the 2023 NBA draft, Davis elected to return to Arkansas for his senior season in 2023–24. On January 27, 2024 it was reported that he had stepped away from the team. On February 5, 2024 it was reported that Davis had returned to the team. On March 20, 2024, after a losing season where Arkansas missed the post-season and head coach Eric Musselman left Arkansas for USC, Davis announced that he was entering his name in the transfer portal. On May 6, 2024 Davis elected to transfer to Oklahoma State, the school he had originally committed to in high school before flipping to Arkansas, for his final year of college basketball.

== Career statistics ==
Legend
GP	Games played	GS	Games started	MPG	Minutes per game
FG%	Field goal percentage	3P%	3-point field goal percentage	FT%	Free throw percentage
RPG	Rebounds per game	APG	Assists per game	SPG	Steals per game
BPG	Blocks per game	PPG	Points per game	**Bold**	Career high

=== College ===
Year	Team	GP	GS	MPG	FG%	3P%	FT%	RPG	APG	SPG	BPG	PPG
2020–21	Arkansas	30	17	23.8	**.476**	.154	**.756**	**4.5**	2.1	1.2	**.2**	8.5
2021–22	Arkansas	**37**	14	27.6	.429	.270	.707	3.7	**2.8**	.9	.0	8.3
2022–23	Arkansas	35	**31**	**33.1**	.415	**.346**	.719	4.4	2.5	**1.4**	.1	**10.9**
2023–24	Arkansas	30	23	27.5	.360	.240	.770	3.4	2.0	.7	.0	5.9
2024–25	Oklahoma State											
Career		132	85	28.1	.440	.256	.727	4.2	2.4	1.1	.1	9.2
