= McAlmont =

McAlmont may refer to:

- McAlmont, Arkansas, populated place in Arkansas, United States
- David McAlmont (born 1967), English musician
