= Cook High School =

Cook High School can refer to:

- Cook High School (Georgia) near Adel, Georgia
- Cook High School (Minnesota) in Cook, Minnesota

== See also ==
- J. C. Cook High School, Wrightsville, Arkansas
- James Cook High School, Manurewa, New Zealand
