= Jacksonville North Pulaski School District =

School district in Arkansas

Jacksonville North Pulaski School District (JNPSD)

Address
- 1424 West Main Street Jacksonville, Arkansas; United States
- Coordinates: 34.8684°N 92.1251°W

District information
- Type: Public
- Grades: PreK–12
- President: Daniel Gray
- Vice-president: Ava Coleman
- Superintendent: Dr. Jeremy Owoh
- School board: Jim Moore; Dana Brockway; Ronald McDaniel; Lauren Martin; Laura Walker; N'keiba J. Estelle
- Schools: Pre-K 1 Elementary 4 Middle 1 High 1

Students and staff
- District mascot: Titans
- Colors: Red, gold, and black

Other information
- Meeting Place: First Monday; Jacksonville City Hall; 1 Municipal Dr; Jacksonville, AR; 6:30 p.m.
- Website: www.jnpsd.org

Jacksonville North Pulaski School District (JNPSD) is a public school district system located in Jacksonville, Arkansas, USA. The district serves the city of Jacksonville and a portion of northeastern Pulaski County, along with a portion of Lonoke County. Upon detachment from Pulaski County Special School District July 1, 2016, the district assumed operation of one high school, one middle school, and seven elementary schools.

== History ==
Until their detachment in 2016, Jacksonville-area schools had been part of the Pulaski County Special School District, one of the largest school districts in Arkansas. In the years leading up to September 2008, parts of the Jacksonville community expressed a desire to split from the PCSSD. This measure was approved by the board of the PCSSD during that month, legally clearing the way for the formation of what would become a separate Jacksonville school district.

In a response to a petition signed by more than 2,000 voters, the Arkansas Board of Education ordered an election to carve a new school district out of the existing PCSSD. Jacksonville voters approved of the separation on September 16, 2014 with a vote of 3,769 for and 218 against (94.53% to 5.47%).

The Arkansas Board of Education approved an order in November 2014 to create a new Jacksonville-area district. The future district would continue to be administered by the Pulaski County Special School District until final detachment projected for July 1, 2016.

A negotiated plan to separate the JNPSD from the PCSSD was approved by U.S. District Judge D. Price Marshall Jr. on October 14, 2015. The plan spelled out how the two school districts would split a multimillion-dollar state desegregation aid payment, assets and liabilities, in anticipation of the new district beginning independent operation on July 1 the following year.

== Schools ==
- Jacksonville High School
- Jacksonville Middle School
- Jacksonville Elementary School
- Bayou Meto Elementary School
- Bobby G. Lester Elementary School
- Murrell Taylor Elementary School
- Homer Adkins Pre-Kindergarten Center

== Former schools ==
- Arnold Drive Elementary School (closed following 2017-2018 school year; replaced by Bobby G. Lester Elementary School)
- Tolleson Elementary School (closed following 2017-2018 school year; replaced by Bobby G. Lester Elementary School)
- Warren Dupree Elementary School (closed following 2023-2024 school year; replaced by Jacksonville Elementary School)
- Pinewood Elementary School (closed following 2023-2024 school year; replaced by Jacksonville Elementary School)

== Athletics ==
In 2016 the district began trademarking its athletic logos, so people selling merchandise reflecting the school district have to pay the school district.
