= Granville Ryles =

American politician (1831–1909)

Granville Ryles (1831–1909) was a minister, farmer, and state legislator in Arkansas. In 1883 he represented Pulaski County in the Arkansas House of Representatives.

He was part of the A.M.E. Church. He was an official at the 1880 Arkansas Colored Convention. He was involved in a legal dispute over a farmed land area he leased in former Indian Territory.

== See also ==
- African American officeholders from the end of the Civil War until before 1900
