= Arkansas Ordnance Plant Guard House =

- U.S. National Register of Historic Places
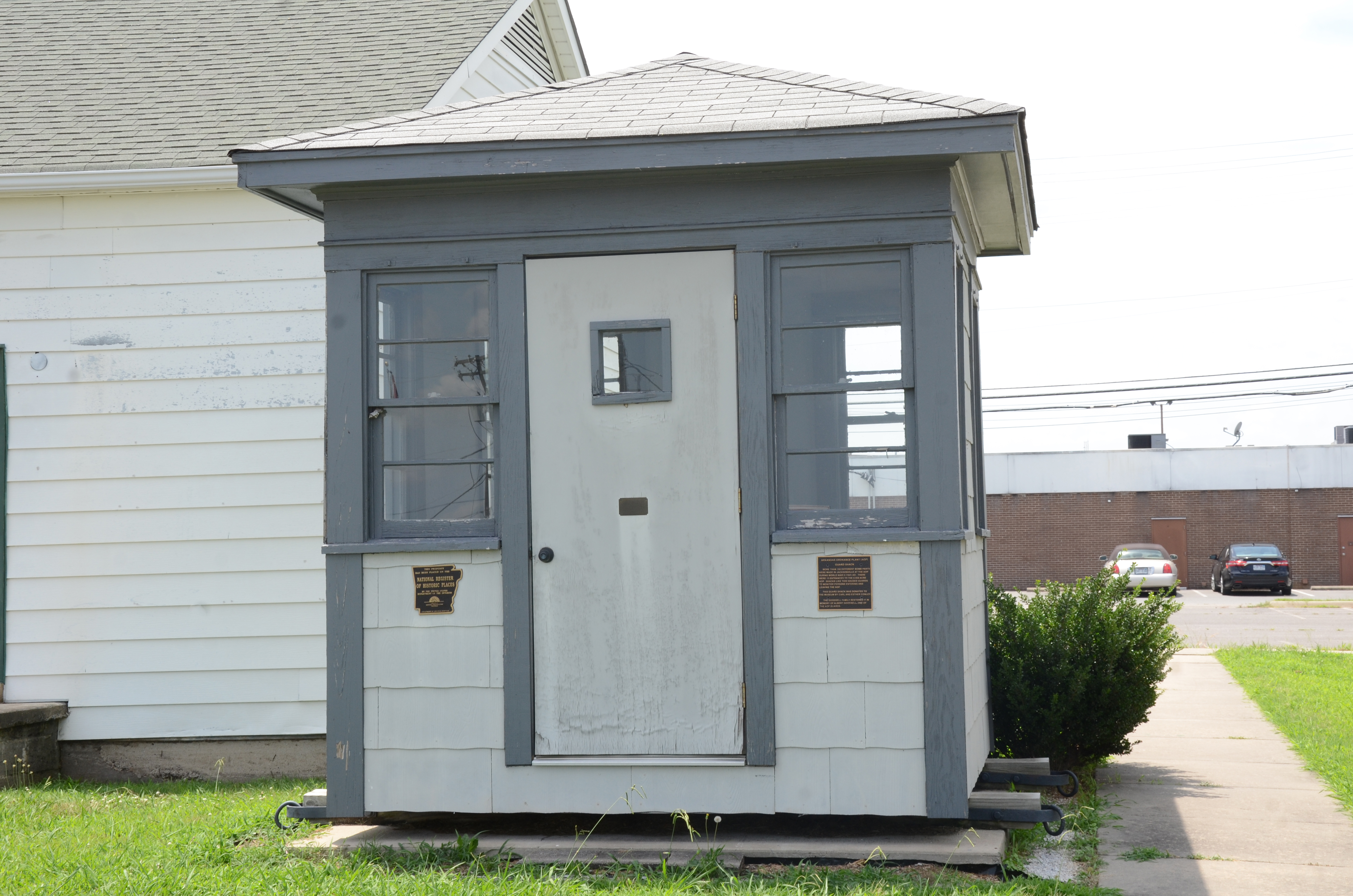

- Location within Arkansas Location within the United States
- Location: One the grounds of the Jacksonville Museum of Military History, 100 Veteran's Circle, Jacksonville, Arkansas
- Coordinates: 34°52′3″N 92°7′22″W
- Area: less than one acre
- Built: 1941
- Architect: Ford, Bacon and Davis Inc.
- Architectural style: Plain Traditional
- NRHP reference No.: 06000831
- Added to NRHP: September 20, 2006

The Arkansas Ordnance Plant Guard House is a historic military structure on the grounds of the Jacksonville Museum of Military History in Jacksonville, Arkansas. It is a square wood-frame structure measuring 9 by 9 by 12 feet (2.7 m × 2.7 m × 3.7 m), mounted on metal skids for ease of relocation. It is presently mounted on a concrete pad to the right of the main museum building, believed to be not far from its original location. It was built in 1941 as part of the facilities of the World War II-era Arkansas Ordnance Plant, a facility that produced fuses and detonators in Jacksonville. After the war it was moved to 1112 MacArthur Drive, and it was moved to the museum in 2006.

== See also ==
- National Register of Historic Places listings in Pulaski County, Arkansas
