= Pulaski County, Arkansas =

County in Arkansas, United States

- County
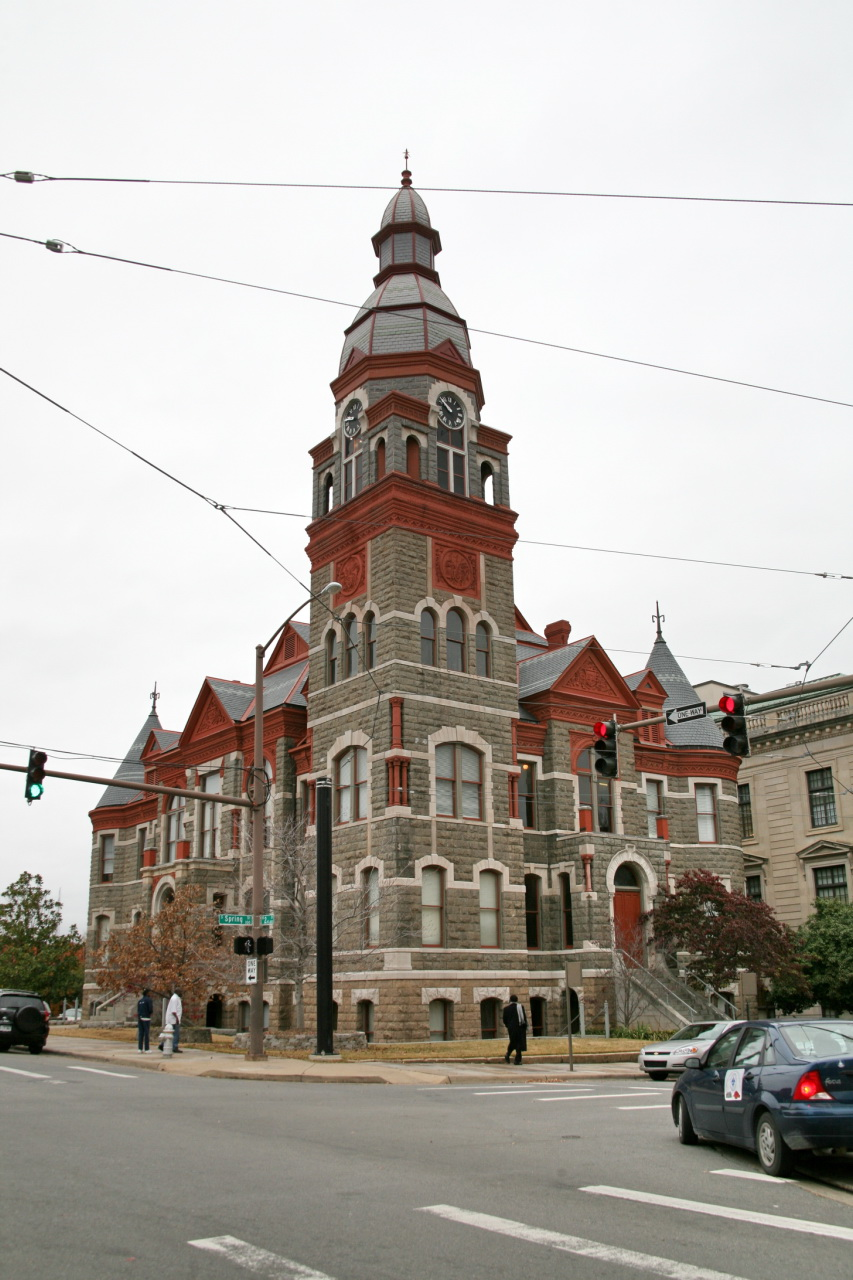
- Pulaski County Courthouse, in downtown Little Rock

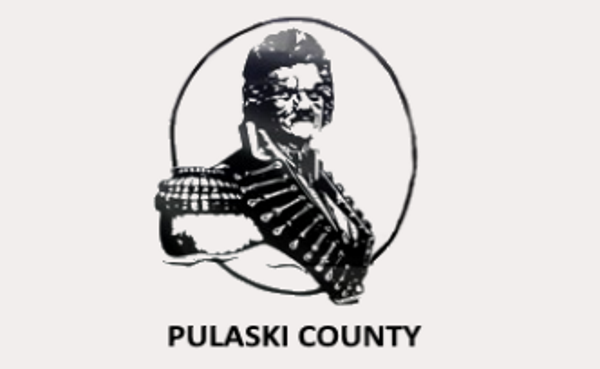
- Flag Seal

- Location within the U.S. state of Arkansas
- Coordinates: 34°44′32″N 92°17′09″W
- Country: United States
- State: Arkansas
- Founded: December 15, 1818
- Named for: Casimir Pulaski
- Seat: Little Rock
- Largest city: Little Rock

Area
  - Total: 808 sq mi (2,090 km^{2})
  - Land: 760 sq mi (2,000 km^{2})
  - Water: 48 sq mi (120 km^{2}) 5.9%

Population (2020)
  - Total: 399,125
  - Estimate (2025): 404,611 ▲
  - Density: 530/sq mi (200/km^{2})
- Time zone: UTC−6 (Central)
  - Summer (DST): UTC−5 (CDT)
- Congressional districts: 1st, 2nd, 4th
- Website: pulaskicounty.net

Pulaski County is a county in the U.S. state of Arkansas. With a population of 399,125 as of the 2020 United States census, it is the most populous county in Arkansas. The county is included in the Little Rock–North Little Rock–Conway metropolitan area. Its county seat is Little Rock, which is also Arkansas's capital and largest city.

Pulaski County is Arkansas's fifth county, formed on December 15, 1818, alongside Clark and Hempstead Counties. Pulaski County is named for Brigadier General Casimir Pulaski, a Polish-born Continental Army officer who was killed in action at the Siege of Savannah during the Revolutionary War. The county was the site of the Battle of Bayou Fourche on September 10, 1863. The Union army took control the same day and occupied Pulaski County until the end of the Civil War. The county was home to Willow Springs Water Park, one of the oldest water parks in the nation, which opened in 1928 and closed in 2013.

== Geography ==
According to the U.S. Census Bureau, the county has a total area of 808 square miles (2,090 km^{2}), of which 760 square miles (2,000 km^{2}) is land and 48 square miles (120 km^{2}) (5.9%) is water.

=== Major highways ===
- I-30
- I-40
- I-57
- I-430
- I-440
- I-530
- I-630
- US 65
- US 67
- US 70
- US 165
- US 167
- AR 5
- AR 10
- AR 89
- AR 100
- AR 107
- AR 111
- AR 113
- AR 161
- AR 176
  - AR 176Y
- AR 294
- AR 300
- AR 338
- AR 365
- AR 367
- AR 386
- AR 391

=== Transit ===
- Rock Region Metro (Metro Streetcar)
- Amtrak Texas Eagle (Little Rock station)
- Greyhound Lines
- Jefferson Lines

=== Adjacent counties ===
- Faulkner County (north)
- Lonoke County (east)
- Grant County (southwest)
- Jefferson County (southeast)
- Saline County (west)
- Perry County (northwest)

=== National protected areas ===
- Little Rock Central High School National Historic Site

== Demographics ==
Historical population
| Census | Pop. | Note | %± |
|---|---|---|---|
| 1830 | 2,395 | | — |
| 1840 | 5,350 | | 123.4% |
| 1850 | 5,657 | | 5.7% |
| 1860 | 11,699 | | 106.8% |
| 1870 | 32,066 | | 174.1% |
| 1880 | 32,616 | | 1.7% |
| 1890 | 47,329 | | 45.1% |
| 1900 | 63,179 | | 33.5% |
| 1910 | 86,751 | | 37.3% |
| 1920 | 109,464 | | 26.2% |
| 1930 | 137,727 | | 25.8% |
| 1940 | 156,085 | | 13.3% |
| 1950 | 196,685 | | 26.0% |
| 1960 | 242,980 | | 23.5% |
| 1970 | 287,189 | | 18.2% |
| 1980 | 340,613 | | 18.6% |
| 1990 | 349,660 | | 2.7% |
| 2000 | 361,474 | | 3.4% |
| 2010 | 382,748 | | 5.9% |
| 2020 | 399,125 | | 4.3% |
| 2025 (est.) | 404,611 | ▲ | 1.4% |
U.S. Decennial Census; 1790–1960 1900–1990; 1990–2000 2010–2020 2020

=== Racial and ethnic composition ===
Pulaski County, Arkansas – Racial and ethnic composition Note: the US Census treats Hispanic/Latino as an ethnic category. This table excludes Latinos from the racial categories and assigns them to a separate category. Hispanics/Latinos may be of any race.
| Race / Ethnicity (NH = Non-Hispanic) | Pop 1980 | Pop 1990 | Pop 2000 | Pop 2010 | Pop 2020 | % 1980 | % 1990 | % 2000 | % 2010 | % 2020 |
|---|---|---|---|---|---|---|---|---|---|---|
| White alone (NH) | 252,893 | 250,549 | 227,390 | 211,697 | 193,993 | 74.25% | 71.66% | 62.91% | 55.31% | 48.60% |
| Black or African American alone (NH) | 80,737 | 91,976 | 114,732 | 133,242 | 142,139 | 23.70% | 26.30% | 31.74% | 34.81% | 35.61% |
| Native American or Alaska Native alone (NH) | 1,064 | 1,128 | 1,303 | 1,267 | 1,169 | 0.31% | 0.32% | 0.36% | 0.33% | 0.29% |
| Asian alone (NH) | 1,731 | 2,692 | 4,440 | 7,425 | 9,933 | 0.51% | 0.77% | 1.23% | 1.94% | 2.49% |
| Native Hawaiian or Pacific Islander alone (NH) | x | x | 115 | 155 | 208 | x | x | 0.03% | 0.04% | 0.05% |
| Other race alone (NH) | 863 | 116 | 300 | 515 | 1,458 | 0.25% | 0.03% | 0.08% | 0.13% | 0.37% |
| Mixed race or Multiracial (NH) | x | x | 4,378 | 6,279 | 17,072 | x | x | 1.21% | 1.64% | 4.28% |
| Hispanic or Latino (any race) | 3,325 | 3,199 | 8,816 | 22,168 | 33,153 | 0.98% | 0.91% | 2.44% | 5.79% | 8.31% |
| Total | 340,613 | 349,660 | 361,474 | 382,748 | 399,125 | 100.00% | 100.00% | 100.00% | 100.00% | 100.00% |

=== 2020 census ===
As of the 2020 census, the county had a population of 399,125. The median age was 38.3 years. 22.4% of residents were under the age of 18 and 16.5% of residents were 65 years of age or older. For every 100 females there were 91.9 males, and for every 100 females age 18 and over there were 88.6 males age 18 and over.

The racial makeup of the county was 49.9% White, 36.0% Black or African American, 0.6% American Indian and Alaska Native, 2.5% Asian, 0.1% Native Hawaiian and Pacific Islander, 4.7% from some other race, and 6.3% from two or more races. Hispanic or Latino residents of any race comprised 8.3% of the population.

88.6% of residents lived in urban areas, while 11.4% lived in rural areas.

There were 170,622 households in the county, of which 28.1% had children under the age of 18 living in them. Of all households, 37.2% were married-couple households, 21.4% were households with a male householder and no spouse or partner present, and 35.5% were households with a female householder and no spouse or partner present. About 35.1% of all households were made up of individuals and 11.8% had someone living alone who was 65 years of age or older.

There were 190,511 housing units, of which 10.4% were vacant. Among occupied housing units, 56.5% were owner-occupied and 43.5% were renter-occupied. The homeowner vacancy rate was 1.9% and the rental vacancy rate was 11.4%.

=== 2000 census ===
As of the 2000 United States census, there were 361,474 people, 147,942 households, and 95,718 families residing in the county. The population density was 469 inhabitants per square mile (181/km^{2}). There were 161,135 housing units at an average density of 209 per square mile (81/km^{2}). The racial makeup of the county was 63.96% White, 31.87% Black or African American, 0.39% Native American, 1.25% Asian, 0.04% Pacific Islander, 1.09% from other races, and 1.40% from two or more races. 2.44% of the population were Hispanic or Latino of any race.

There were 147,942 households, out of which 30.50% had children under the age of 18 living with them, 45.90% were married couples living together, 15.10% had a female householder with no husband present, and 35.30% were non-families. 30.00% of all households were made up of individuals, and 8.80% had someone living alone who was 65 years of age or older. The average household size was 2.39 and the average family size was 2.98.

In the county, the population was spread out, with 25.20% under the age of 18, 9.60% from 18 to 24, 31.10% from 25 to 44, 22.60% from 45 to 64, and 11.50% who were 65 years of age or older. The median age was 35 years. For every 100 females, there were 92.00 males. For every 100 females age 18 and over, there were 88.20 males.

The median income for a household in the county was $38,120, and the median income for a family was $46,523. Males had a median income of $33,131 versus $25,943 for females. The per capita income for the county was $21,466. About 10.40% of families and 13.30% of the population were below the poverty line, including 19.90% of those under age 18 and 9.80% of those age 65 or over.

== Government and infrastructure ==
=== Government ===
The county government is a constitutional body granted specific powers by the Constitution of Arkansas and the Arkansas Code. The quorum court is the legislative branch of the county government and controls all spending and revenue collection. Representatives are called justices of the peace and are elected from county districts every even-numbered year. The number of districts in a county vary from nine to fifteen, and district boundaries are drawn by the county election commission. The Pulaski County Quorum Court has fifteen members. Presiding over quorum court meetings is the county judge, who serves as the chief executive officer of the county. The county judge is elected at-large and does not vote in quorum court business, although capable of vetoing quorum court decisions.

Pulaski County, Arkansas Elected countywide officials
| Position | Officeholder | Party |
|---|---|---|
| County Judge | Barry Hyde | Democratic |
| Sheriff | Eric Higgins | Democratic |
| County Clerk/Circuit Clerk | Terri Hollingsworth | Democratic |
| Assessor | Janet Troutman Ward | Democratic |
| Treasurer | Debra Buckner | Democratic |

The composition of the Quorum Court after the 2024 elections is 10 Democrats and 5 Republicans. Justices of the Peace (members) of the Quorum Court following the elections are:

- District 1: Rebekah L. Davis (R)
- District 2: Natalie Capps (D)
- District 3: Kathy Lewison (D)
- District 4: Julie Blackwood (D)
- District 5: Steven Person (D)
- District 6: Donna Massey (D)
- District 7: Dianne Curry (D)
- District 8: Curtis Keith (D)
- District 9: Tina Ward (D)
- District 10: Patricia Young-Baker (D)
- District 11: Aaron Robinson (R)
- District 12: Luke McCoy (R)
- District 13: Phil Stowers (R)
- District 14: Paul Elliott (R)
- District 15: Staci Medlock (D)

Additionally, the townships of Pulaski County are entitled to elect their own respective constables, as set forth by the Constitution of Arkansas. Constables are largely of historical significance as they were used to keep the peace in rural areas when travel was more difficult.

The township constables of Pulaski County as of the 2024 elections are:

- Big Rock: Frank Gilbert (Libertarian)
- Hill: Robert Wells (Democratic)

=== Infrastructure ===
The Arkansas Department of Correction Wrightsville Unit is in Wrightsville.

== Politics ==
Pulaski County is one of the most Democratic counties in Arkansas and the Southern United States. The city of North Little Rock was ranked the most liberal community in the state.

In the Reconstruction Era following the Civil War, Republicans carried the county in every presidential election from 1868 to 1888. Since then, Republicans have only won the county four times: 1956, 1972, 1984, and 1988, all national Republican landslides.

Pulaski County has followed in the footsteps of most urban counties across the country, especially in the era of Barack Obama's presidency and post-presidency that has seen urban areas turn bluer and rural areas, such as most of Arkansas, to become even redder and more conservative. Donald Trump, the two-time winner of the state with over 60% of the vote, only garnered about 38% in this county, among his worst performances in this state. Joe Biden's 59.98% share in 2020 is the highest for a Democrat in the county since 1976, besting even Arkansas native Bill Clinton in both 1992 and 1996.

United States presidential election results for Pulaski County, Arkansas
| Year | Republican | | Democratic | | Third party(ies) | |
| Year | No. | % | No. | % | No. | % |
|---|---|---|---|---|---|---|
| 1892 | 2,492 | 39.07% | 3,392 | 53.18% | 494 | 7.75% |
| 1896 | 1,754 | 35.84% | 3,021 | 61.73% | 119 | 2.43% |
| 1900 | 1,932 | 41.85% | 2,609 | 56.52% | 75 | 1.62% |
| 1904 | 2,450 | 42.44% | 3,099 | 53.68% | 224 | 3.88% |
| 1908 | 3,533 | 45.68% | 3,893 | 50.33% | 309 | 3.99% |
| 1912 | 1,044 | 16.76% | 3,369 | 54.09% | 1,815 | 29.14% |
| 1916 | 2,593 | 30.15% | 6,008 | 69.85% | 0 | 0.00% |
| 1920 | 3,711 | 35.80% | 6,506 | 62.76% | 150 | 1.45% |
| 1924 | 2,729 | 28.36% | 5,706 | 59.30% | 1,187 | 12.34% |
| 1928 | 4,880 | 34.55% | 9,215 | 65.24% | 29 | 0.21% |
| 1932 | 2,281 | 13.87% | 14,049 | 85.46% | 110 | 0.67% |
| 1936 | 1,320 | 10.29% | 11,482 | 89.49% | 28 | 0.22% |
| 1940 | 2,955 | 17.15% | 14,219 | 82.52% | 56 | 0.33% |
| 1944 | 6,069 | 26.87% | 16,470 | 72.91% | 50 | 0.22% |
| 1948 | 5,910 | 23.99% | 13,120 | 53.25% | 5,609 | 22.76% |
| 1952 | 23,460 | 48.59% | 24,448 | 50.63% | 378 | 0.78% |
| 1956 | 25,702 | 51.10% | 23,372 | 46.46% | 1,227 | 2.44% |
| 1960 | 22,146 | 39.70% | 26,034 | 46.67% | 7,608 | 13.64% |
| 1964 | 38,312 | 48.32% | 40,535 | 51.12% | 442 | 0.56% |
| 1968 | 26,709 | 33.32% | 27,597 | 34.43% | 25,844 | 32.24% |
| 1972 | 57,576 | 62.95% | 33,611 | 36.75% | 281 | 0.31% |
| 1976 | 37,690 | 37.14% | 63,541 | 62.62% | 244 | 0.24% |
| 1980 | 52,125 | 46.15% | 54,839 | 48.56% | 5,973 | 5.29% |
| 1984 | 77,651 | 58.20% | 54,237 | 40.65% | 1,530 | 1.15% |
| 1988 | 70,562 | 54.98% | 55,857 | 43.53% | 1,914 | 1.49% |
| 1992 | 47,789 | 34.89% | 79,482 | 58.03% | 9,686 | 7.07% |
| 1996 | 44,780 | 35.06% | 75,084 | 58.78% | 7,869 | 6.16% |
| 2000 | 55,866 | 43.94% | 68,320 | 53.73% | 2,965 | 2.33% |
| 2004 | 67,903 | 44.20% | 84,532 | 55.03% | 1,185 | 0.77% |
| 2008 | 70,212 | 43.52% | 88,854 | 55.07% | 2,277 | 1.41% |
| 2012 | 68,984 | 43.28% | 87,248 | 54.74% | 3,149 | 1.98% |
| 2016 | 61,257 | 38.34% | 89,574 | 56.06% | 8,945 | 5.60% |
| 2020 | 63,687 | 37.47% | 101,947 | 59.98% | 4,322 | 2.54% |
| 2024 | 57,977 | 37.67% | 92,038 | 59.79% | 3,909 | 2.54% |

== Education ==
Tertiary

- Pulaski Technical College is a two-year community college and technical school that offers seven locations throughout the county, including a flagship campus in western North Little Rock.
- Four-year postsecondary institutions include the University of Arkansas at Little Rock, the University of Arkansas System's only metropolitan campus, the United Methodist Church-affiliated Philander Smith College, Arkansas Baptist College, and the University of Arkansas for Medical Sciences — all located in Little Rock.

School districts include:

- Jacksonville North Pulaski School District
- Little Rock School District
- North Little Rock School District
- Pulaski County Special School District
- East End School District

State-operated schools

- Arkansas School for the Blind
- Arkansas School for the Deaf

== Communities ==
=== Cities ===
- Cammack Village
- Jacksonville
- Little Rock (county seat)
- Maumelle
- North Little Rock
- Sherwood
- Wrightsville

=== Town ===
- Alexander (mostly in Saline County)

=== Census-designated places ===
- College Station
- Gibson
- Hensley
- Landmark
- McAlmont
- Natural Steps
- Roland
- Scott
- Sweet Home
- Woodson

=== Other communities ===
- Crystal Hill
- Gravel Ridge
- Ironton
- Little Italy
- Mabelvale
- Marche
- Pankey
- Woodyardville

=== Townships ===
Townships in Arkansas are the divisions of a county. Each township includes unincorporated areas and some may have incorporated towns or cities within part of their space. Townships have limited purposes in modern times. However, the US Census does list Arkansas population based on townships (often referred to as "minor civil divisions"). Townships are also of value for historical purposes in terms of genealogical research. Each town or city is within one or more townships in an Arkansas county based on census maps. Pulaski County only has two townships, as of 2010. They are listed below.

| Township | FIPS code | ANSI code (GNIS ID) | Population center(s) | Pop. (2010) | Pop. density (/mi^{2}) | Pop. density (/km^{2}) | Land area (mi^{2}) | Land area (km^{2}) | Water area (mi^{2}) | Water area (km^{2}) | Geographic coordinates |
|---|---|---|---|---|---|---|---|---|---|---|---|
| Big Rock | 05-90300 | 69013 | Alexander, Cammack Village, Little Rock, Wrightsville | 219,984 | 506.7 | 195.6 | 404.014 | 1,046 | 30.148 | 78.08 | 34°44′30″N 92°24′43″W |
| Hill | 05-91731 | 69014 | Jacksonville, Maumelle, North Little Rock, Sherwood | 162,764 | 435.8 | 168.3 | 355.750 | 921.4 | 17.753 | 45.98 | 34°48′12″N 92°11′32″W |
Source: U.S. Census Bureau

== Notable people ==
- Karilyn Brown, member of the Arkansas House of Representatives
- Granville Ryles (1831–1909), minister, farmer and state legislator in Arkansas
- Derek Fisher, NBA player

== See also ==
- List of lakes in Pulaski County, Arkansas
- National Register of Historic Places listings in Pulaski County, Arkansas
