= Ironton, Arkansas =

- Unincorporated community
- Interactive map of Ironton, Arkansas
- Coordinates: 34°37′55″N 92°16′39″W
- Country: United States
- State: Arkansas
- Elevation: 100 m (328 ft)
- GNIS feature ID: 50524

Ironton is a small unincorporated community in Pulaski County, Arkansas, United States, to the west of Wrightsville, and near Landmark. Namesakes include Ironton Baptist Church, Ironton Road, and Ironton cut-off. There are a few businesses in Ironton, and a fishing area.

The area is in the Pulaski County Special School District.
