= Pulaski County Special School District =

School district in Arkansas

Pulaski County Special School District (PCSSD)

Location
- 925 East Dixon Road; Little Rock (postal address), Arkansas 72206 United States
- Coordinates: 34°40′20.4″N 92°15′17.1″W

District information
- Type: Public (government funded)
- Grades: PK-12
- Established: July 21, 1927
- Superintendent: Jeff Senn
- Accreditation: Arkansas Department of Education
- Schools: 26 (4 high schools, 4 middle schools, 1 junior high, 17 elementary schools)
- NCES District ID: 0511850

Students and staff
- Students: 12,000
- Teachers: 1,000
- Student–teacher ratio: 25

Other information
- Website: www.pcssd.org

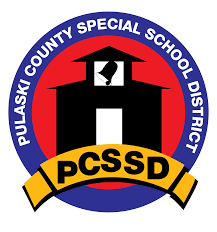

Pulaski County Special School District No. 1 (PCSSD) is one of four public school districts in Pulaski County, Arkansas—along with the Little Rock School District, the North Little Rock School District, and the Jacksonville North Pulaski School District—accredited by the Arkansas Department of Education. PCSSD has its headquarters in Sweet Home, an unincorporated area near southeastern Little Rock; the headquarters has a Little Rock postal address.

The current Pulaski County Special School District was established on July 21, 1927, by referendum pursuant of Act 152 of the 1927 Arkansas Acts by the Arkansas legislature joining thirty-eight independent school districts into a "special" school district. As of 2019–20, PCSSD has the sixth-highest student enrollment in the state. Geographically, PCSSD is the state's fifth largest district and encompasses a total 729 square miles (1,890 km^{2}), and includes most areas of the county—incorporated and unincorporated—excluding most areas within the city limits of Little Rock, Cammack Village, most areas within the city of North Little Rock, Jacksonville, and a section of McAlmont.

== History ==
=== LRSD vs. PCSSD (desegregation) ===
Prior to July 1, 2016, the three school districts within the county—Little Rock School District (LRSD), North Little Rock School District (NLRSD), and Pulaski County Special School District (PCSSD)—had been involved in a desegregation case that the courts determined were unconstitutionally segregated and placed under court supervision since 1982. The Pulaski County Special School District had a segregated administrative structure well into the late 1970s. Viola Harris was the Assistant Superintendent for the segregated schools located in the rural predominantly Black communities of Pulaski County encompassing College Station, Sweet Home, Pankey, McAlmont and others. The Black teachers and principals reported to Viola Harris, and were paid significantly less than their white counterparts in the Pulaski County Special School District. The current Harris Elementary School was named to honor Viola Harris and her dedication to the education of Black students in the rural communities of Pulaski County. Students in the Black Schools received the discarded and outdated textbooks from the white schools in the PCSSD. The desegregation litigation sought remedies for these historical disparities.

After numerous actions were satisfied, the courts determined that LRSD to be unitary (or integrated) and generally coterminous with Little Rock's boundaries. In doing so, these actions led to the annexation of J. A. Fair High School and other schools from PCSSD to LRSD in 1987. In 2007, the courts determined that all actions by LRSD were completed and that court supervision continues until NLRSD and PCSSD actions are completed.

=== PCSSD school board dissolved ===
On May 19, 2011, the court determined that PCSSD had not completed nine of twelve actions required by court supervision with regards to being unitary in the desegregation case.

On June 20, 2011, the Arkansas Department of Education abolished and dissolved the PCSSD School Board and fired its current superintendent, Dr. Charles Hopson amid alleged financial troubles and the aforementioned lack of completing required desegregation actions. This also lead to the state department taking over the school district.

== Service area ==
This district boundary includes, in addition to the Sweet Home CDP, the entirety of the Pulaski County municipalities of Maumelle, Sherwood (including the former Gravel Ridge CDP), and Wrightsville, as well as portions of Little Rock and North Little Rock. It also includes the portion of Alexander in Pulaski County, which is an exclave.

It also includes the census-designated places of Sweet Home, College Station, Hensley, Landmark (formerly Parkers-Iron Springs), Natural Steps, Roland, and Woodson, as well as portions of McAlmont and the Pulaski County portion of Scott. Other unincorporated areas include Crystal Hill, and Ironton.

The district extends into Saline County, where it serves a portion of Shannon Hills, into Lonoke County, which includes its portion of Scott CDP, and into Faulkner County.

== Enrollment ==
Enrollment by year
School Year	Total Students	Full-Time Equivalent Teachers	Pupil/Teacher Ratio
2012–13	17,937	1,126.25	15.93
2011–12	17,637	1,188.87	14.84
2010–11	17,501	1,235.13	14.17
2009–10	17,734	1,411.00	12.57
2008–09	18,063	1,354.00	13.30
2007–08	18,016	1,369.00	13.20
2006–07	18,374	1,168.00	15.70
2005–06	18,587	1,186.00	15.70
2004–05	18,449	1,144.00	16.10
2003–04	18,522	1,202.00	15.40
2002–03	18,323	1,213.00	15.10
2001–02	18,657	1,270.00	14.70
2000–01	18,735	1,235.00	15.20
1999–00	19,045	1,130.00	16.90
1998–99	19,437	1,289.00	15.10
1997–98	20,029	1,203.20	16.60

Since 1997–98, PCSSD has served approximately 17,500 to 20,000 students each year supported by approximately 1,100 to 1,400 full time equivalent teachers, with a steady reduction of the pupil/teacher ratio from 16.60 to 1 (1997–98) to 14.84 to 1 (2011–12).

== Schools ==
=== High schools ===
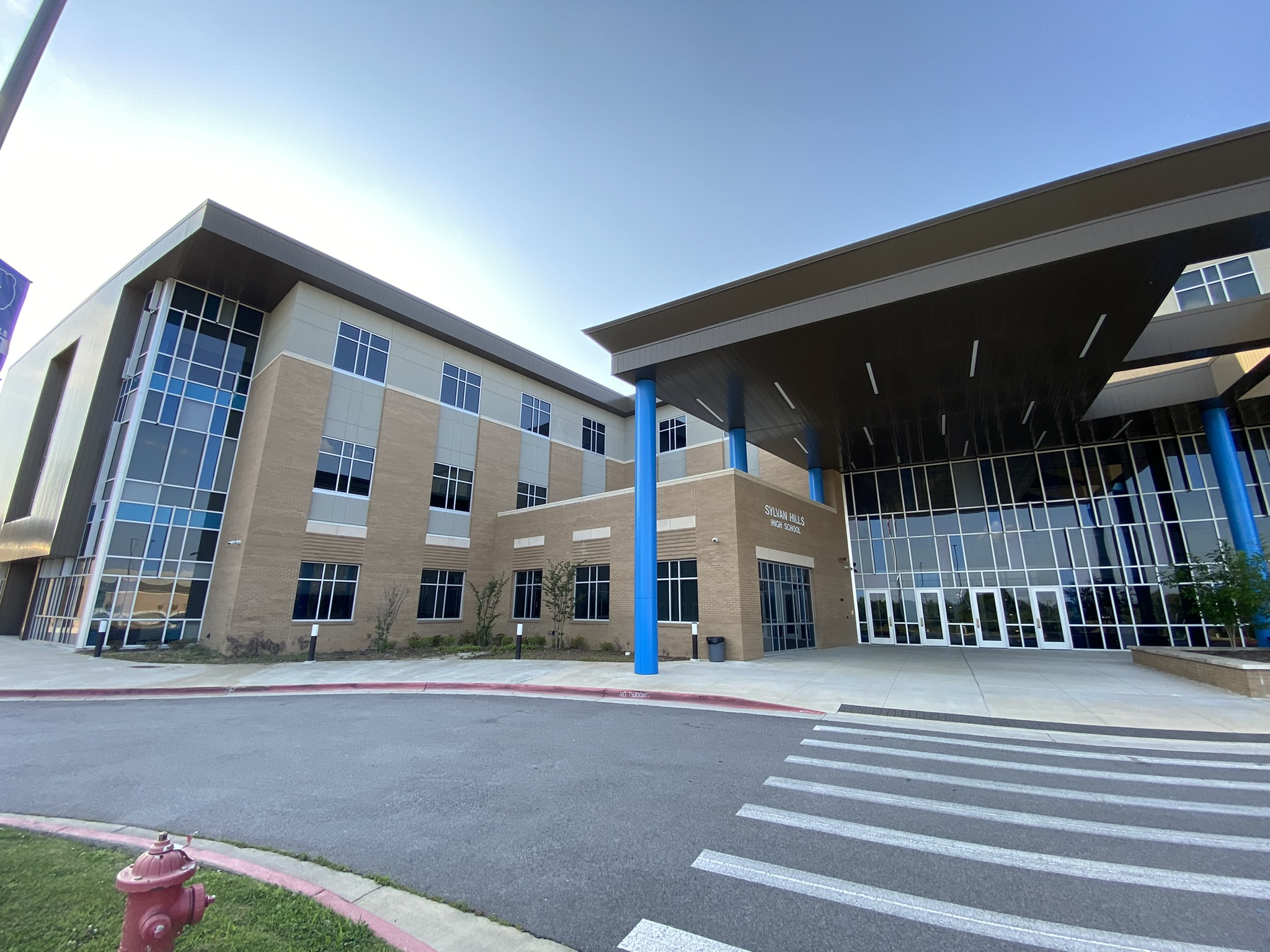
Sylvan Hills High School

The Pulaski County Special School District maintains four comprehensive public high schools. In 2011–12, PCSSD closed Oak Grove High School with the opening of the newly constructed Maumelle High School. The last school built in PCSSD prior to Maumelle High School was J. A. Fair High School, which subsequently moved to the Little Rock School District. Joe T. Robinson High School moved to new facilities starting in the 1981–82 school year. North Pulaski High School was established in 1977, Wilbur D. Mills High School opened in 1969, and Sylvan Hills High School was founded in 1956 and moved to newer facilities in November 1968. Jacksonville High School was originally located on the site of present-day Jacksonville Elementary. Next, JHS moved to 1320 School Drive (now serving as Jacksonville Middle School) until the start of the 1969–70 school year, when it moved to 2400 Linda Lane. Jacksonville High School was removed from the Pulaski County Special School District on July 1, 2016, as part of the formation of the Jacksonville North Pulaski School District.

A new campus for Wilbur D Mills High School was opened in August 2018. The school was built on the grounds that formerly held Fuller Middle School. The Fuller Middle School students moved into the old buildings of Mills High School, becoming Mills Middle School.

The assumed course of study for students at each high school follows the Smart Core curriculum developed by the Arkansas Department of Education (ADE), which requires each student to complete 22 units to graduate; 16 units are from the Smart Core and 6 units that are career focused in occupational pathway areas. According to the Arkansas Department of Career Education (ACE), the Standards of Accreditation of Public Schools require that each school offer three programs of study in three different occupational pathway areas.

- Wilbur D. Mills High School offered 13 programs of study in 13 different pathways.
- North Pulaski High School offered 12 programs of study in 12 different pathways.
- Joe T. Robinson High School offered 10 programs of study in 10 different pathways.
- Sylvan Hills High School offered 9 programs of study in 9 different pathways.
- Sylvan Hills Freshman Campus offered in 10 program 6 different pathways.

Sortable table
School Name	Location	Grades	Opened/ Current Facility	NCES School ID	CEEB Code	Website(s)
Maumelle High School	Maumelle	9–12	2011	0511850001559	041861	Official website
Wilbur D. Mills University Studies High School	Little Rock	9–12	1969 (Opened) / 2018 (Current)	051185000945	042390	Official website
Joe T. Robinson High School	Unincorporated	9–12	1927 (Opened) / 1980 (Current)	051185000923	041430	Official website
Sylvan Hills High School	Sherwood	11–12	1956 (Opened) / 2020 (Current)	051185000941	041872	Official website
Sylvan Hills High School North	Gibson (Unincorporated)	9–10	2016	TBA	TBA	Official website

=== Middle schools ===
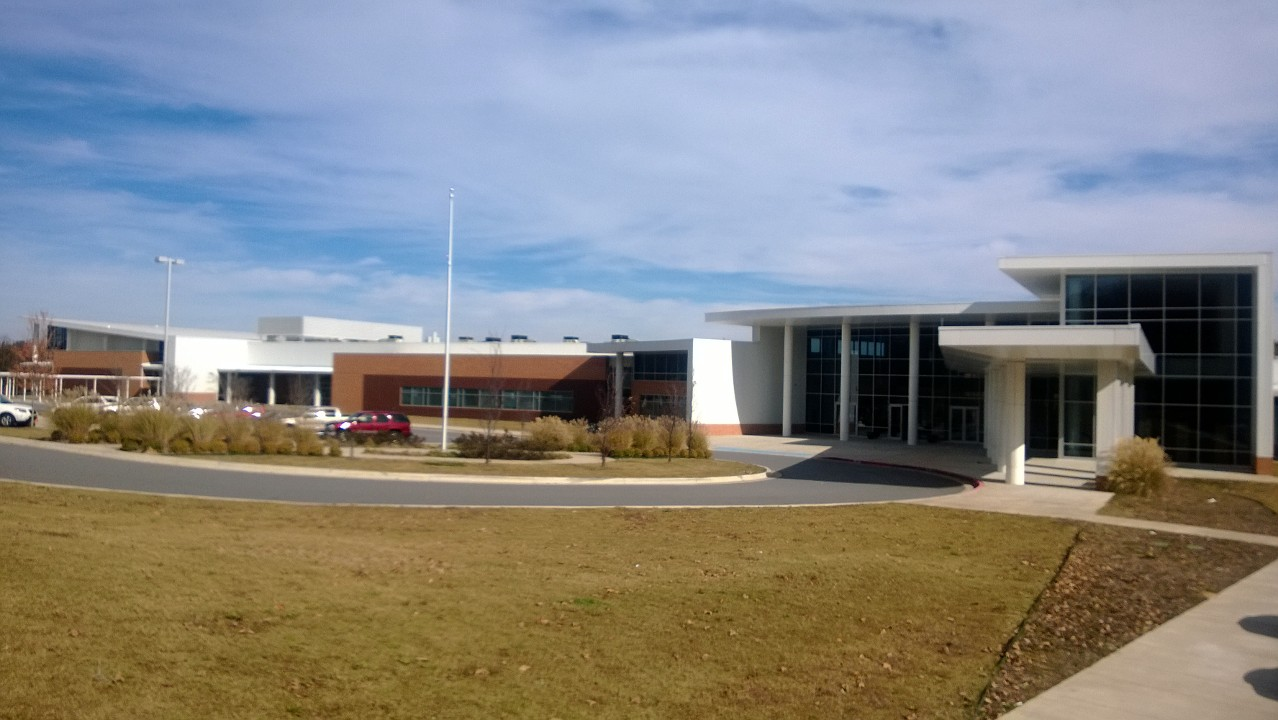
Exterior view of entrance to Sylvan Hills Middle School that was constructed in 2011.

In fall 2011, a new 44 acres (18 ha) campus facility for Sylvan Hills Middle School opened for grades 6-8 students and staff, replacing the original high school (1955-1967) / middle school (1967-2011) facilities located adjacent to the Sylvan Hills High School and Sylvan Hills Elementary School campus.

In August 2018, Fuller Middle School moved into the old buildings of Mills High School, constructed in 1969. The school was renamed as Mills Middle. A new Robinson Middle School was also opened. Along with the new Mills High School, these schools cost about $80 million.

Sortable table
School Name	Location	Grades	NCES School ID	Website(s)
Mills Middle School	Little Rock	6–8	051185000914	Official website PCSSD page
Maumelle Middle School	Maumelle	6–8	051185001106	Official website PCSSD page
Joe T. Robinson Middle School	Unincorporated	6–8	051185001258	Official website
Sylvan Hills Junior High	Sherwood	6-8		
Sylvan Hills Middle School	Sherwood	6–8	051185000942	Official website PCSSD page

† denotes Title I school

=== Elementary schools ===
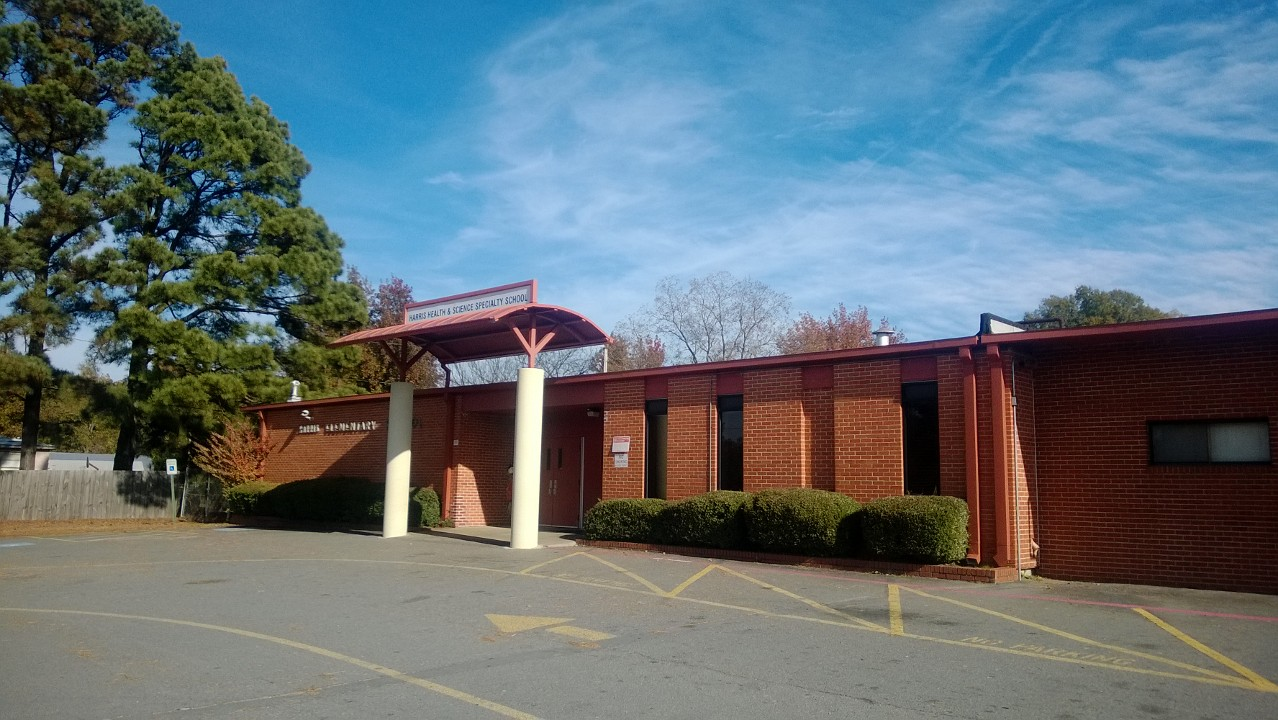
Front entrance to Harris Health & Science Specialty Elementary School in McAlmont

The Pulaski County Special School District operates 16 elementary schools including several magnet schools and specialty schools providing focus on particular subject areas. In 2008, the William Jefferson Clinton Elementary Magnet School was named a National Blue Ribbon School, followed by a National Blue Ribbon School designation for Arnold Drive Elementary School in 2010, and Pine Forest Elementary School in 2024.

Sherwood Elementary's Odyssey of the Mind team takes the Arkansas State Tournament and went to the World Finals. Also, Dupree Elementary received a National School of Distinction status from the Schools Fight Hunger program.

Harris Elementary School named in honor of Viola H. Harris, a former administrator of the district and McAlmont Elementary School, served as Pulaski Technical School before being renamed as Harris High School starting in the fall of 1963 and lasting until 1970 when the district reorganized its facilities as a result of desegregation and the facility became an elementary school. The high school's mascot of the Panthers remains today as Harris Elementary School's mascot.

Sortable table
School Name	Location	Grades	NCES School ID	Website(s)
John W. Baker Inter-district Elementary School	Little Rock	K–5	051185000903	Official website
Daisy Bates Elementary School †	Unincorporated	PK–5	051185001391	Official website
Cato Elementary School †	Unincorporated	PK–5	051185000906	Official website
Chenal Elementary School †	Little Rock	K-5	051185001484	Official website
William Jefferson Clinton Speech Communications and Technology Magnet Elementary School †	Sherwood	PK–5	051185000122	Official website
College Station Magnet Elementary School †	College Station	PK–5	051185000910	Official website
Crystal Hill Elementary School †	North Little Rock	PK–5	051185000058	Official website
Harris Health & Science Specialty Elementary School †	McAlmont (Unincorporated)	PK–5	051185000916	Official website
Joe T. Robinson Elementary School †	Unincorporated	PK–5	051185000922	Official website
Landmark Fine Arts Specialty Elementary School †	Landmark (Unincorporated)	PK–5	051185000927	Official website
Lawson Elementary School †	Unincorporated	PK–5	051185000928	Official website
Oak Grove Elementary School †	Unincorporated	PK–5	051185000933	Official website
Oakbrooke Elementary School †	Sherwood	PK–5	051185001239	Official website
Pine Forest Elementary School	Maumelle	K–5	051185001257	Official website PCSSD page
Sherwood Elementary School †	Sherwood	PK–5	051185000939	Official website
Sylvan Hills Elementary School †	Sherwood	PK–5	051185000940	Official website

† denotes Title I school

=== Former schools ===
Primarily as a result of desegregation or the need to replace aging facilities, numerous facilities have been renamed or closed including the following:

Former high schools

J. C. Cook High School (a Black school in Wrightsville) was closed as a result of desegregation and repurposed as an integrated J. C. Cook Elementary School until 1976.

- In 1963, Pulaski County Training School (a Black school) was renamed as Harris High School.
- In 1970, Harris High School was repurposed as Harris Elementary School.
- In 1971, McAlmont High School (grades 7–12) was closed as a result of desegregation.
- In 1987, J.A. Fair High School (opened in 1982), and John L. McClellan High School (opened in 1965) were annexed to Little Rock School District.
- In 2011, Oak Grove High School was closed as a result of opening nearby Maumelle High School.
- In 2016, North Pulaski High School was merged with Jacksonville High School as a part of the Jacksonville North Pulaski School District.
- The Sweet Home community had a high school populated by students from College Station Elementary School.

Former middle schools

- In 2001, Sylvan Hills Junior High School (grades 7–9) becomes Sylvan Hills Middle School (grades 6–8).
- In 2011, Sylvan Hills Middle School closes its facilities at 401 Dee Jay Hudson Drive; reopens for 2011–12 school year at its new facilities across AR Highway 107 at 10001 Johnson Street.
- In 2015 Northwood Middle School was repurposed as Sylvan Hills Freshman Campus due to a large portion of the student population being reallocated to the new Jacksonville North Pulaski School District. The remainder were assigned to Sylvan Hills Middle School.
- Jacksonville Middle School is now in the Jacksonville North Pulaski School District.

Former elementary schools

- In 1971, McAlmont Elementary School is closed.
- In 1976, J. C. Cook Elementary School is closed.
- In 1987, Mabelvale Elementary School annexed to Little Rock School District with the opening of Daisy Bates Elementary School.
- In 2006, Homer Adkins Elementary School was converted into a Pre-K school
- In 2011, Jacksonville Elementary School is closed.
- In 2014, Scott Elementary is closed
