= Jacksonville, Arkansas =

- City
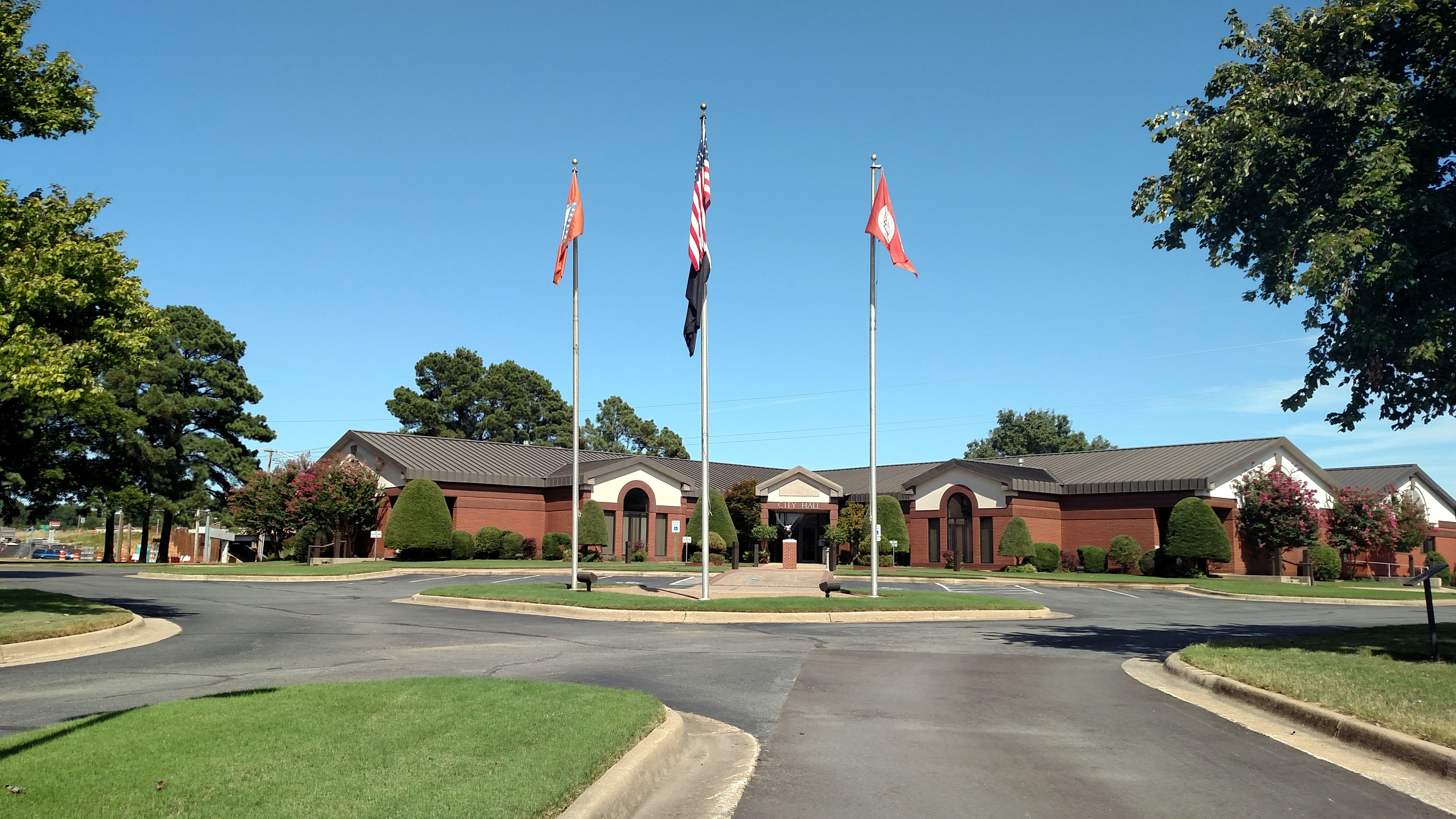
- City Hall

- Flag Seal
- Motto: "Soaring Higher"
- Location of Jacksonville in Pulaski County, Arkansas.

- Location in the United States
- Coordinates: 34°52′23″N 92°06′55″W
- Country: United States
- State: Arkansas
- County: Pulaski
- Founded: 1870
- Incorporated: 1941

Government
  - Mayor: Jeff Elmore

Area
  - City: 28.86 sq mi (74.74 km^{2})
  - Land: 28.64 sq mi (74.19 km^{2})
  - Water: 0.21 sq mi (0.54 km^{2})
- Elevation: 302 ft (92 m)

Population (2020)
  - City: 29,477
  - Estimate (2025): 29,460 ▼
  - Density: 1,029/sq mi (397.3/km^{2})
  - Metro: 729,135 ('14) (Little Rock-North Little Rock-Conway)
- Time zone: UTC-6 (CST)
  - Summer (DST): UTC-5 (CDT)
- ZIP codes: 72076
- Area code: 501
- FIPS code: 05-34750
- GNIS feature ID: 2404781
- Website: www.jacksonvillear.gov

Jacksonville is a city in Pulaski County, Arkansas, United States. As of the 2020 census, Jacksonville had a population of 29,477. It is part of the Little Rock-North Little Rock-Conway metropolitan area with 729,135 people as of 2014.

== History ==
The city is named for Nicholas Jackson, a landowner who deeded the land for the railroad right-of-way to the Cairo & Fulton Railroad in 1870. The community evolved from the settlement surrounding the railroad depot, eventually incorporating in 1941. In 1941, construction began on the Arkansas Ordnance Plant (AOP), which served as the primary facility for the development of fuses and detonators for World War II. Following the war, AOP ceased operations and the land was sold for commercial interests, including the development of the Little Rock Air Force Base in 1955. Today, portions of AOP still remain, including the Arkansas Ordnance Plant Guard House, which is on the National Register of Historic Places and the Jacksonville Museum of Military History. Despite Pulaski County being an Arkansas county that is not a "dry" county, as it allows the sales of beer and liquor, the municipal limits of Jacksonville are "moist", as it does not allow the sales of alcohol in stores, but allows the sale of alcohol in some restaurants with special permits.

== Geography ==
According to the United States Census Bureau, the city has a total area of 28.2 square miles (73.1 km^{2}), of which 28.1 square miles (72.8 km^{2}) is land and 0.12 square miles (0.3 km^{2}), or 0.42%, is water.

=== Climate ===
The climate in this area is characterized by hot, humid summers and generally mild to cool winters. According to the Köppen Climate Classification system, Jacksonville has a humid subtropical climate, abbreviated "Cfa" on climate maps.

== Demographics ==
Historical population
| Census | Pop. | Note | %± |
|---|---|---|---|
| 1950 | 2,474 | | — |
| 1960 | 14,488 | | 485.6% |
| 1970 | 19,832 | | 36.9% |
| 1980 | 27,589 | | 39.1% |
| 1990 | 29,101 | | 5.5% |
| 2000 | 29,916 | | 2.8% |
| 2010 | 28,364 | | −5.2% |
| 2020 | 29,477 | | 3.9% |
| 2025 (est.) | 29,460 | ▼ | −0.1% |
U.S. Decennial Census

=== Racial and ethnic composition ===
Jacksonville city, Arkansas – Racial and ethnic composition Note: the US Census treats Hispanic/Latino as an ethnic category. This table excludes Latinos from the racial categories and assigns them to a separate category. Hispanics/Latinos may be of any race.
| Race / Ethnicity (NH = Non-Hispanic) | Pop 2000 | Pop 2010 | Pop 2020 | % 2000 | % 2010 | % 2020 |
|---|---|---|---|---|---|---|
| White alone (NH) | 20,104 | 15,594 | 12,743 | 67.20% | 54.98% | 43.23% |
| Black or African American alone (NH) | 7,357 | 9,184 | 11,757 | 24.59% | 32.38% | 39.89% |
| Native American or Alaska Native alone (NH) | 135 | 133 | 110 | 0.45% | 0.47% | 0.37% |
| Asian alone (NH) | 580 | 576 | 542 | 1.94% | 2.03% | 1.84% |
| Native Hawaiian or Pacific Islander alone (NH) | 32 | 24 | 59 | 0.11% | 0.08% | 0.20% |
| Other race alone (NH) | 48 | 42 | 120 | 0.16% | 0.15% | 0.41% |
| Mixed race or Multiracial (NH) | 648 | 921 | 1,966 | 2.17% | 3.25% | 6.67% |
| Hispanic or Latino (any race) | 1,012 | 1,890 | 2,180 | 3.38% | 6.66% | 7.40% |
| Total | 29,916 | 28,364 | 29,477 | 100.00% | 100.00% | 100.00% |

=== 2020 census ===
As of the 2020 census, Jacksonville had a population of 29,477 and 11,455 households, including 7,025 families. The median age was 33.5 years. 25.8% of residents were under the age of 18 and 13.5% were 65 years of age or older. For every 100 females there were 95.3 males, and for every 100 females age 18 and over there were 90.9 males age 18 and over.

96.4% of residents lived in urban areas, while 3.6% lived in rural areas.

Of the city's 11,455 households, 34.0% had children under the age of 18 living in them. Of all households, 37.0% were married-couple households, 20.1% were households with a male householder and no spouse or partner present, and 35.7% were households with a female householder and no spouse or partner present. About 30.1% of all households were made up of individuals and 10.3% had someone living alone who was 65 years of age or older.

There were 12,738 housing units, of which 10.1% were vacant. The homeowner vacancy rate was 2.2% and the rental vacancy rate was 10.5%.

Racial composition as of the 2020 census
| Race | Number | Percent |
|---|---|---|
| White | 13,244 | 44.9% |
| Black or African American | 11,876 | 40.3% |
| American Indian and Alaska Native | 172 | 0.6% |
| Asian | 555 | 1.9% |
| Native Hawaiian and Other Pacific Islander | 60 | 0.2% |
| Some other race | 965 | 3.3% |
| Two or more races | 2,605 | 8.8% |

=== 2000 census ===
As of the census of 2000, there were 29,916 people, 10,890 households, and 8,004 families residing in the city. The population density was 1,134.2 inhabitants per square mile (437.9/km^{2}). There were 11,890 housing units at an average density of 450.8 per square mile (174.1/km^{2}). The racial makeup of the city was 64.17% White, 27.88% Black or African American, 0.50% Native American, 1.98% Asian, 0.13% Pacific Islander, 1.14% from other races, and 2.58% from two or more races. 6.24% of the population were Hispanic or Latino of any race.

There were 10,890 households, out of which 40.2% had children under the age of 18 living with them, 55.1% were married couples living together, 14.6% had a female householder with no husband present, and 26.5% were non-families. 22.0% of all households were made up of individuals, and 5.9% had someone living alone who was 65 years of age or older. The average household size was 2.64 and the average family size was 3.08.

In the city, the population was spread out, with 29.0% under the age of 18, 12.8% from 18 to 24, 33.2% from 25 to 44, 17.6% from 45 to 64, and 7.3% who were 65 years of age or older. The median age was 30 years. For every 100 females, there were 100.4 males. For every 100 females age 18 and over, there were 98.4 males.

The median income for a household in the city was $35,460, and the median income for a family was $40,381. Males had a median income of $26,708 versus $21,804 for females. The per capita income for the city was $16,369. About 11.9% of families and 14.2% of the population were below the poverty line, including 20.5% of those under age 18 and 7.9% of those age 65 or over.

== Arts and culture ==
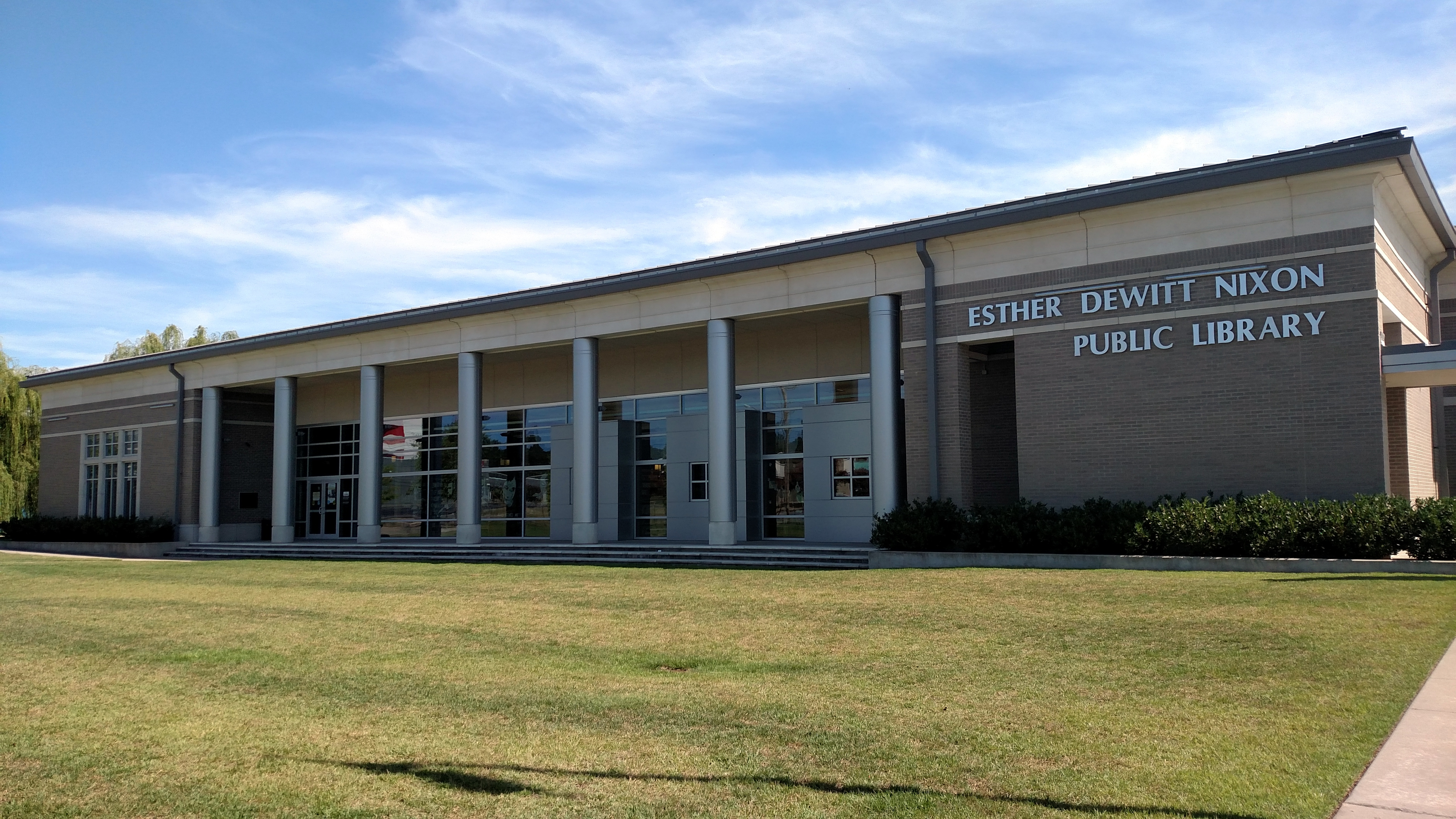
Nixon Library in Jacksonville

The Central Arkansas Library System includes the Esther Dewitt Nixon Library in Jacksonville.

Attractions that Jacksonville include:

- Arkansas Game and Fish Foundation Shooting Sports Complex
- Bayou Meto Urban Canoe Trail
- Jacksonville Guitar Center and Museum
- Jacksonville Museum of Military History
- Jacksonville Farmers Market
- Reed’s Bridge Battlefield Heritage Park
- Splash Zone

== Parks and recreation ==
In this list are the 8 parks currently located within Jacksonville.

- Dupree Park
- Fireman Park
- Excell Park
- Galloway Park
- Johnson Park
- Paradise Park
- Northlake Park
- Stagecoach Park

== Education ==
Since 1927, Jacksonville had been part of the Pulaski County Special School District, one of the largest school districts in Arkansas. In the years leading up to September 2008, parts of the Jacksonville community expressed a desire to split from the PCSSD. This measure was approved by the board of the PCSSD during that month, clearing the way, legally, for the formation of what would become Jacksonville North Pulaski School District.

In a response to a petition signed by more than 2,000 voters, the Arkansas Board of Education ordered an election to carve a new school district out of the existing Pulaski County Special School District. Jacksonville voters approved of the separation on September 16, 2014, with a vote of 3,672 for and 202 against (95% to 5%).

According to JNPSD officials, the district would be administered by the Pulaski County Special School District until its final detachment, which became effective July 1, 2016.

The district consists of six elementary schools, one middle school and one high school. The schools include Jacksonville High School, Jacksonville Middle School, Bayou Meto Elementary, Bobby G Lester Elementary, Jacksonville Elementary School, and Murrell Taylor Elementary.

Arkansas State University-Beebe maintains a degree center at Little Rock Air Force Base for post-secondary education.

== Notable people ==
- Grady Adkins, pitcher for Chicago White Sox 1928-29
- Homer Martin Adkins, governor of Arkansas, from 1941 to 1945, born in Jacksonville in 1890.
- Kris Allen, American Idol Season 8 winner
- Lisa Blount, actress, memorable role An Officer and a Gentleman
- Dan Hampton, retired NFL football defensive tackle for the Chicago Bears
- Demetrius Harris, tight end for NFL's Kansas City Chiefs
- Bob Johnson, Democratic member of the Arkansas House of Representatives
- Jakob Junis (born 1992), baseball pitcher for the San Francisco Giants
- Clinton McDonald, defensive tackle for NFL's Tampa Bay Buccaneers
- Glen Rice, NBA champion in 2000
- Robert Thomas, NFL football fullback
