= J. C. Cook High School =

Location
- Wrightsville, Arkansas; 34.60283°N 92.21577°W

Information
- Other name: J.C. Cook Elementary School (after desegregation)
- Last updated: 29 December 2017

J. C. Cook High School was a public high school for black children in Wrightsville, Arkansas, operated by the Pulaski County Special School District.

The school originally occupied a frame building. A newer seven-classroom facility was built circa 1956, and the older building was closed. At the time Cook was one of two high schools for black children in portions of Pulaski County outside of the City of Little Rock. Around 1958 it had 395 students from its own territory.

In 1958–1959 the Little Rock School District closed all of its schools, so 205 black students were temporarily transferred from Horace Mann High School in Little Rock to J. C. Cook. Therefore, J. C. Cook reopened the original school building and hired four additional teachers. Due to its size, the school was unable to accommodate all of the students from Mann.

After desegregation the facility was converted into J.C. Cook Elementary School.
