= Sylvan Hills High School =

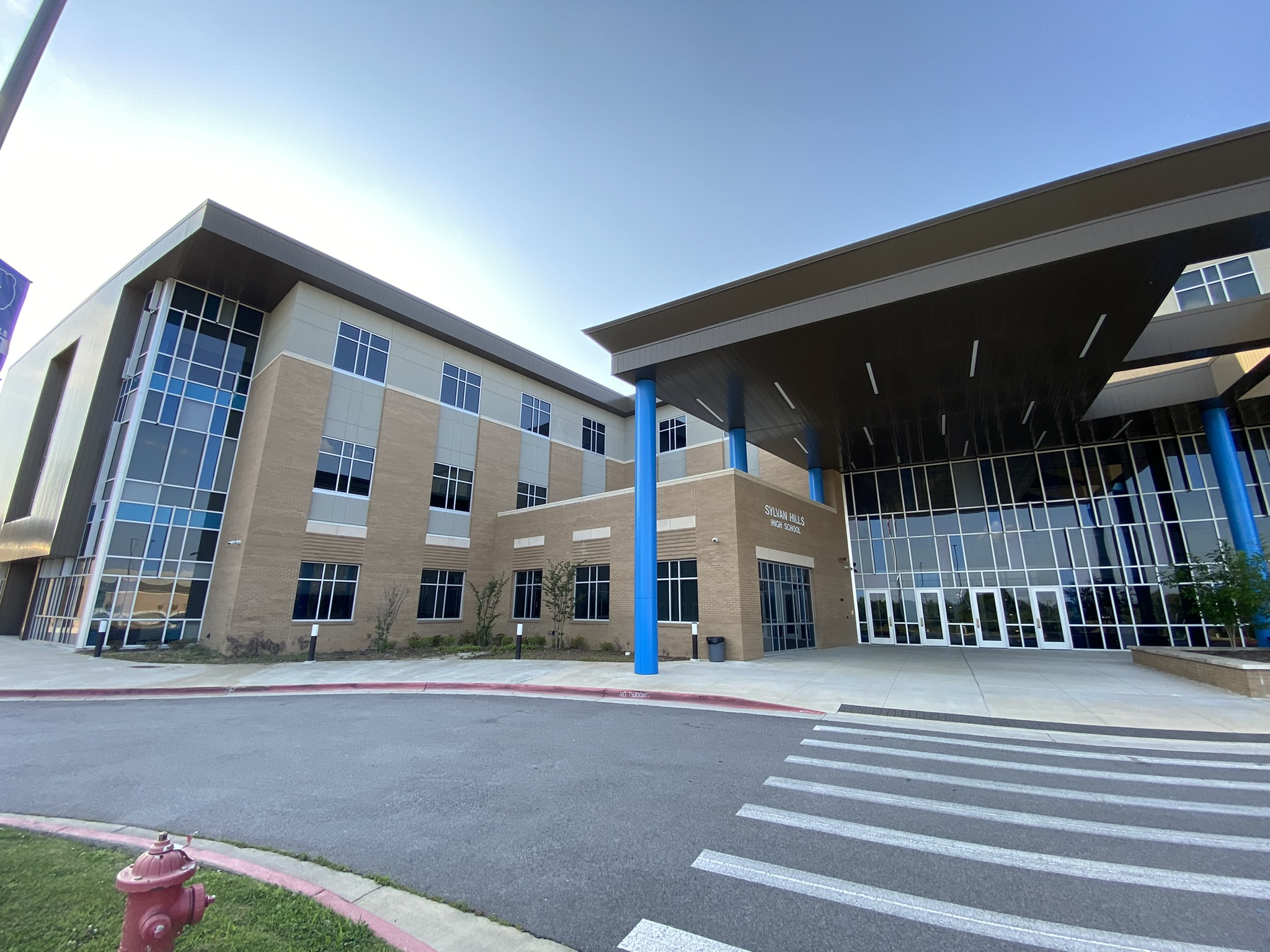
- Exterior view to the main entrance of academic building opened in 2019

Location
- 484 Bear Paw Road; Sherwood, Arkansas 72120; United States; 34°51′0″N 92°14′1″W

Information
- School type: Public, high school
- Motto: Building Champions
- Established: August 1956 (70 years ago)
- Status: Open
- School district: Pulaski County Special School District
- NCES District ID: 0511850
- CEEB code: 041872
- NCES School ID: 051185000941
- Principals: Tracy Allen
- Teaching staff: 87.97 (FTE)
- Grades: 9–12
- Enrollment: 1,120 (2024–25)
- Student to teacher ratio: 12.73
- Education system: ADE Smart Core curriculum Arkansas Advanced Initiative for Math and Science (2013–)
- Hours in school day: 7.0
- Campus type: Suburban
- Colors: Blue and white
- Athletics conference: Arkansas Activities Association
- Sports: Football, volleyball, golf, bowling, competitive cheer, dance, cross country, wrestling, basketball, swimming, archery, baseball, softball, soccer, swimming, tennis, track and field
- Mascot: Bear
- Team name: Sylvan Hills Bears and Lady Bears
- Accreditation: ADE, Cognia (formerly North Central / AdvancED) (1962–present)
- Newspaper: The Banner
- Yearbook: The Bruin
- Feeder schools: Sylvan Hills Middle School
- Affiliations: Arkansas Activities Association (1959–); College Board (1993–); Paul Mitchell Schools; Advancement Via Individual Determination (AVID) (2019–)
- Website: shhs.pcssd.org

Sylvan Hills High School is an accredited comprehensive public high school located in Sherwood, Arkansas, United States, serving grades nine through twelve. Established in August 1956, the school serves as one of four high schools administered by the Pulaski County Special School District (PCSSD). The school originally evolved from a local primary and junior high institution founded in 1928, eventually expanding to graduate its first senior class in 1959. To accommodate a rapidly growing student population fueled by the nearby Little Rock Air Force Base, the school transitioned to its current suburban campus during the 1968–69 academic year. The campus recently underwent a massive $65 million capital improvement and expansion project completed between 2019 and 2021, which introduced a new three-story main building, a state-of-the-art multipurpose arena, an indoor practice facility, and a 999-seat performing arts center. In 2024, the school and its surrounding community feeder pattern achieved international recognition by breaking the Guinness World Record for the longest human electric circuit.

The school operates as a closed campus and relies on the state's college- and career-ready Smart Core curriculum. Sylvan Hills is designated as an Arkansas Department of Education School of Innovation, utilizing a personalized learning model and partnering with local higher education institutions to offer concurrent college enrollment and professional career pathways. In the 2025–26 U.S. News & World Report Best High Schools rankings, Sylvan Hills was placed at No. 105 within the state of Arkansas. Students balance their coursework with award-winning student publications, including The Banner newspaper and The Bruin yearbook, as well as several specialized academic honor societies.

Extracurricularly, the Sylvan Hills Bears and Lady Bears field competitive varsity athletic teams primarily sanctioned by the Arkansas Activities Association. Sylvan Hills has captured 24 state championships across nine sports, highlighted by a historically dominant baseball program that holds a state-record 64 tournament victories and eight state titles. The girls' track and field program has similarly excelled, capturing seven indoor and outdoor state titles. The school has also produced multiple notable alumni across athletics and the arts, including actor Wes Bentley, Major League Baseball star Kevin McReynolds, and 2016 Olympic long jump gold medalist Jeff Henderson.

== History ==
Prior to 1956, Sylvan Hills School instructed students through grade nine until local citizens gathered to approve expanding the school to a senior high, resulting in its first graduating class in 1959. Then, because of the increasing population in the surrounding communities, the school moved to its current campus adjacent to its former facilities starting in the 1968–69 school year.

=== Early years (1928–1956) ===
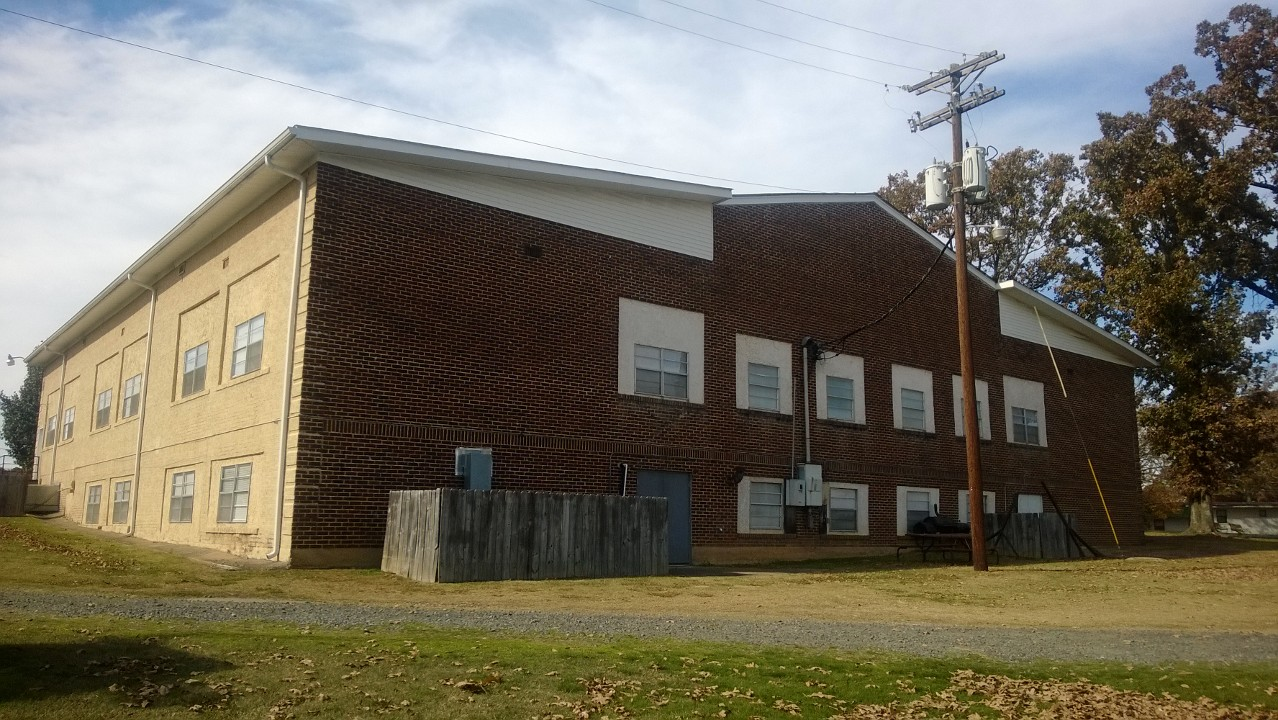
Rear exterior view of the Sherwood First Church of the Nazarene, formerly J. H. Forby Hall that served as part of Sylvan Hills School (1930–56)

In 1928, the first building of the Sylvan Hills School was built at 8900 Highway 107 for students in the 1st–9th grades that lived in the Sylvan Hills community. This building, which was known as "Roy Todd Hall," no longer stands. In December 1928, the newly created Pulaski County Special School District (PCSSD) purchased two lots near the original building from Justin Matthews Sr., for $550 each. As Todd Hall could no longer accommodate the growing population of students, the PCSSD built a new building for students in the 5th–9th grades, named "J. H. Forby Hall," which opened in February 1930 at a cost of $26,542. This is equivalent to $511,542 in present-day terms.. Forby Hall contained eight classrooms and a gymnasium. This is the building that is now the Sherwood First Church of the Nazarene, located at 8800 Highway 107 in Sherwood.

In 1948, a third school building was built and was named "Gertrude Price Hall." Mrs. Price was one of the first teachers at the Sylvan Hills School. Today, this building is now the home of the Retirement Centers of Arkansas, Inc.

=== Original campus (1956–1968) ===
Established in 1956 to serve the nearby city of Sherwood and surrounding northeastern Pulaski County communities, Sylvan Hills High School was named after the early and heavily wooded community and to expand Sylvan Hills School, which previously served students from first through ninth grade. Between 1956 and 1959, students attended North Little Rock High School to graduate high school until the Sylvan Hills naturally expanded each year to accept students in the 10th, 11th and 12th grades. The complex that was completed in the fall of 1956 produced the first Sylvan Hills High School graduating class of 1959 consisted of 101 students with the baseball team making it to the state finals.

As the community grew population due, in part, to the 1955 development of the Little Rock Air Force Base in nearby Jacksonville, it became necessary to expand once again.

=== Current campus (1968–) ===
In 1967, the Baldwin Company began construction on a new 325,000 square feet (30,200 m^{2}) high school facility, which cost $1.25 million (or $11 million in present-day terms.) Along with $250,000 in furnishings (present day $2.19 million)., the school consisted of 23 classrooms, a gymnasium and pressrooms, choir home, home economics department, cafeteria and a fully equipped library. In November 1968, 523 students and 32 staff moved into the present day Sylvan Hills High School, resulting in junior high students (grades 7–9) now occupying the older complex until 2011. Annexation of the combined high school, middle school and elementary campus locations from North Little Rock to the city of Sherwood occurred in 1976. Enrollment for 1976 shows 1,289 students at Sylvan Hills High School and 1,414 students attending Sylvan Hills Junior High School.

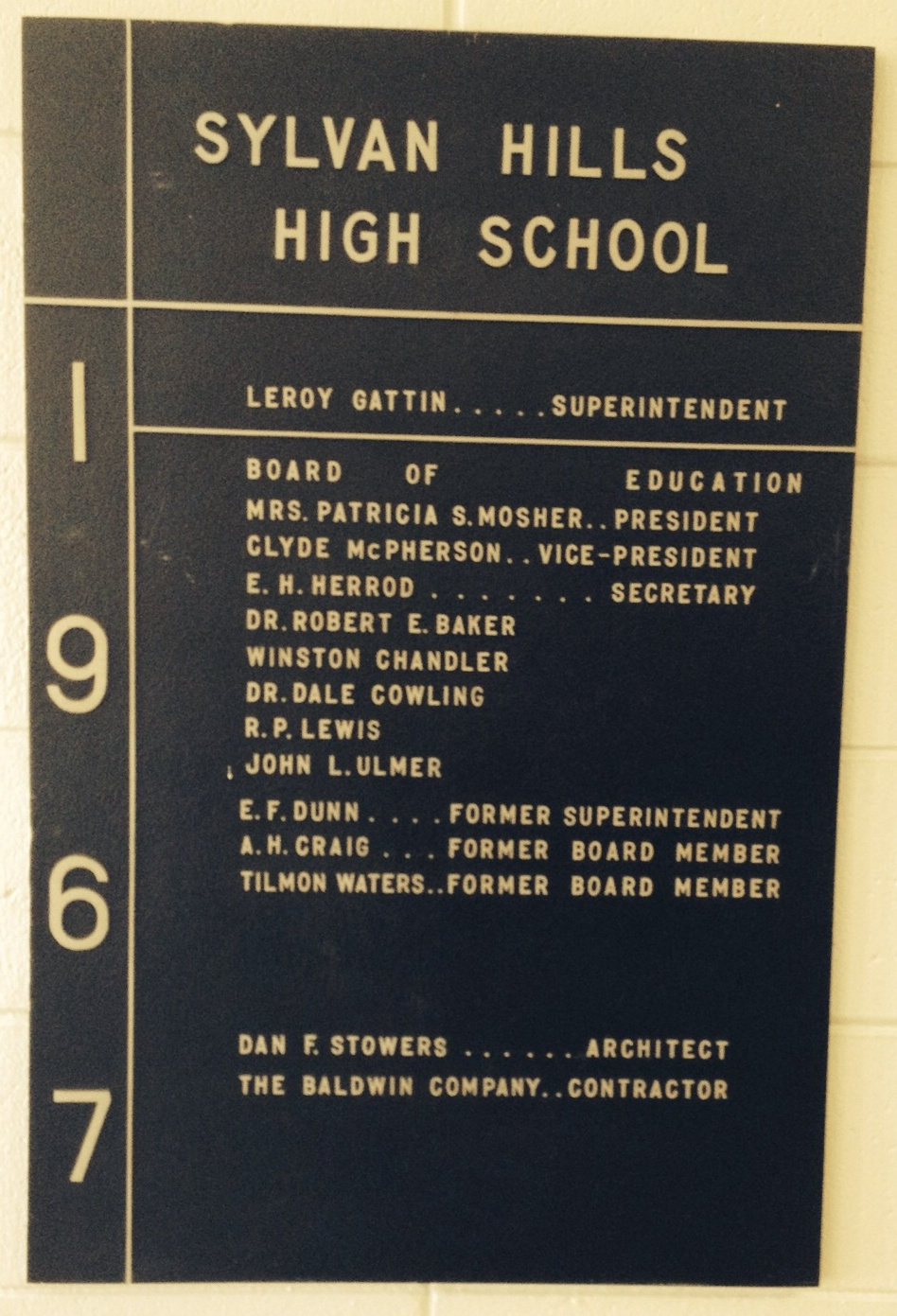
Sylvan Hills High School 1967 construction placard

Since 1962 the school has been accredited by AdvancED and by 1965 the school won its first sports state championship in baseball. When North Pulaski High School was opened in 1977, the school board zones were redrawn, which subsequently has led to a natural rivalry between the two schools throughout the years. In the 1990s, the high school facility began serving grades 9–12, shifting the junior high to be renamed as Sylvan Hills Middle School for grades 6–8. In April 2008, the school suffered severe roof damage from a storm's high winds resulting in over $750,000 (present day $1.12 million) in repairs. Following those repairs, the school dedicated the Jim Burgett Auditorium in honor of the school's musical director from 1967 to 1982. By 2011, major renovations had been completed to the school's gymnasium, bathrooms and the construction of a bridge to the practice field. Since the original construction, the school has added several smaller buildings, including the East and West buildings, the automotive shop facilities and has housed temporary buildings throughout the years based on changing student populations.

In fall 2011, a new 44 acres (18 ha) campus facility for Sylvan Hills Middle School opened for grades 6–8 students and staff, replacing the original high school (1955–1968) / middle school (1968–2011) facilities located adjacent to the high school and Sylvan Hills Elementary School campus. Since 2011–12 school year, the high school has used the former middle school campus as a 9th grade academy.

The high school and its new middle school are feed by Sylvan Hills Elementary School, Oakbrooke Elementary School, Sherwood Elementary School, and the William J. Clinton Speech Communications and Technology Magnet Elementary School, which is a 2008 National Blue Ribbon School.

==== Addition of Sylvan Hills North / Junior High (2016–present) ====
In 2016, PCSSD opened the Sylvan Hills Freshman Campus after the closure of Northwood Middle School, due to an over-expansion of 9th graders at the high school. The freshman campus is held on a portion of the former middle school campus. In 2018, it was announced that the 10th graders would also move to the freshman campus, as the main campus was being partially demolished to build a new, larger high school campus. Starting in fall 2021, the school became known as Sylvan Hills Junior High.

==== Recent expansions (2019–present) ====
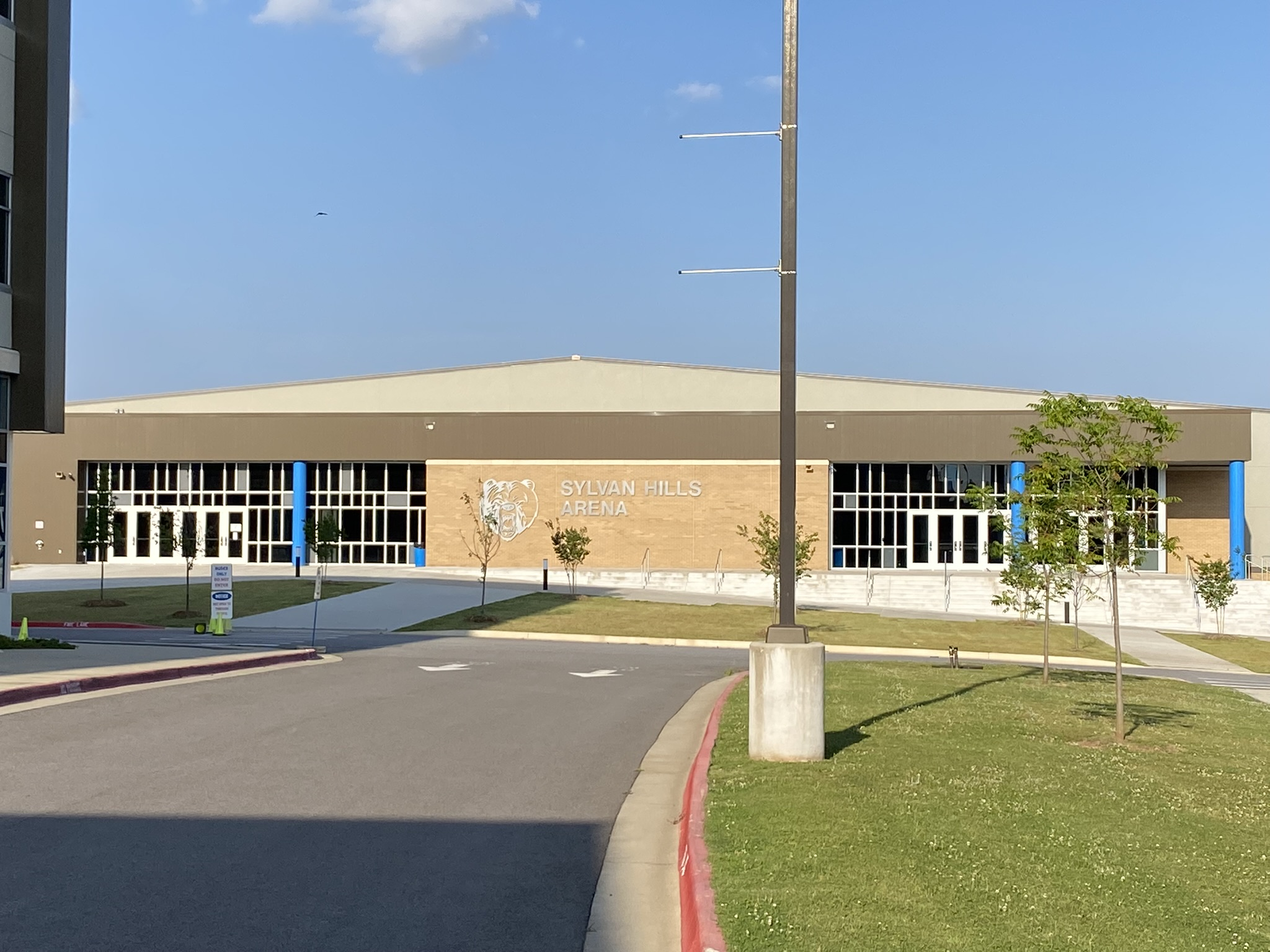
Sylvan Hills Arena

Beginning in fall 2019, the school year began in a new three-story classroom expansion, which is now the main school building and has science labs, a new library/media center, cafeteria, and more than 30 classrooms in an environment designed by WER Architects/Planners. This will complete the $65M capital improvement and expansion of the SHHS campus. Three other buildings that are currently under construction and are scheduled to be complete within the next year. The Indoor Practice Facility (IPF) and the Multipurpose Arena opened August 2020. The Performing Arts Center opened in fall 2020 and holds 999 seats. In addition to the main building, several elements of the original campus are in use for the 2020–21 school year including:

(1) Building 1 — the two-story, original main building used for various classes and 10th grade cafeteria;
(2) Building 500 — which supports art, stagecraft and cosmetology classes; and
(3) Engineering Building — a single story, 4–classroom annex.

=== Policy enforcement controversy ===
In 2010, Sylvan Hills was the subject of legal controversy surrounding the confiscation of a student's cell phone by school officials. Sylvan Hills' administration officials were enforcing the PCSSD policy regarding cell phone use by students while in the classroom, which is a violation of the PCSSD Student Handbook. According to the district's handbook, such a violation allows officials to confiscate the phone for two weeks before returning the device. These actions eventually resulted in the lawsuit Koch v. Adams on the basis that the officials' actions resulted in conversion and trespass to chattels. The trial court dismissed the case, which subsequently led to the case being heard by the Arkansas Supreme Court, which by unanimous decision had upheld the school district's policy and the lower court's decision to allow such confiscation and that no violation of state or federal policy occurred. As school districts around the United States have similar policies regarding students' cell phone use in classrooms, this legal decision has been widely discussed in the education community.

=== Awards and recognition ===
Since 1993, Sylvan Hills High School has been an institutional member of The College Board. In 2008, Sylvan Hills was recognized with an Arkansas Picturing America Award, which is an initiative by the National Endowment for the Humanities that brings masterpieces of American art into classrooms and libraries nationwide.

A Sylvan Hills student was named one of Arkansas' top two youth volunteers for 2009 by The Prudential Spirit of Community Awards, a nationwide program honoring young people for acts of voluntarism. The scholar was honored for mapping and compiling information on the 3,500 gravesites at the Arkansas State Veterans Cemetery located in North Little Rock. The awards program is conducted by Prudential Financial in partnership with the National Association of Secondary School Principals (NASSP). In 2012, AdvancED recognized the school for maintaining 50 years of educational certification.

==== Guinness World Book of Records ====
In 2024, nearly 3,000 students from kindergarten through 11th grades joined together, quite literally, to break the Guinness World Record for Longest Human Electric Circuit record. Students and staff from all eight schools in the Sylvan Hills feeder pattern attended the event along with local community members, and county school officials and board members.

== Academics ==
Sylvan Hills is a closed campus; students are not allowed to leave school supervision during school hours. The school’s attendance boundary includes Sherwood, Gibson, and portions of McAlmont.

=== Enrollment ===
Enrollment by year
School Year	Total Students	Full-Time Equivalent Teachers	Pupil/Teacher Ratio
2024–25	1,120	87.97	12.73
2023–24	1,061	87.71	12.10
2022–23	1,017	70.24	14.48
2021–22	1,003	68.37	14.67
2020–21	1,473	101.10	14.57
2019–20	1,428	150.09	9.51
2018–19	1,427	97.55	14.63
2017–18	1,437	96.27	14.77
2016–17	1,422	96.27	14.77
2015–16	1,265	76.14	16.61
2014–15	975	61.04	15.97
2013–14	870	57.36	15.17
2012–13	829	52.16	15.89
2011–12	807	56.04	14.40
2010–11	825	58.97	13.99
2009–10	809	69.50	11.64
2008–09	914	73.00	12.50
2007–08	919	69.00	13.30
2006–07	955	74.00	12.90
2005–06	1,018	73.00	13.90
2004–05	1,050	76.00	13.80
2003–04	1,156	73.00	15.80
2002–03	1,110	69.00	16.10
2001–02	1,055	70.00	15.10
2000–01	712	51.00	14.00
1999–00	727	57.00	12.80
1998–99	723	36.90	19.60
1997–98	785	46.40	16.90

As of the 2024–2025 school year, 1,120 students attended Sylvan Hills High School. Of these 2023–24 school year students, there were 406 sophomores, 355 juniors, and 299 seniors. The student body predominantly consisted of Black Americans (45.5%) and Caucasians (39.7%). Latinos (8%), Mixed students (5.8%), Asians (0.7%), and Native Americans (0.3%) made up the remainder of the student population. 41% of the student body were also noted as being economically disadvantaged.

As of the 2018–19 school year, the school had an enrollment of 1,427 students and 97.55 classroom teachers (on full time equivalent (FTE) basis), for a student–teacher ratio of 14.63:1 The student population at Sylvan Hills is predominantly White and African American, with a small Hispanic and Latino American minority and other minorities. The attendance rate is 90.4 percent and the dropout rate is 0.9 percent for Sylvan Hills students. Forty-five percent of students qualify for free or reduced price lunch; the state average is 60 percent.

Sylvan Hills receives federal funding via the Title I "schoolwide program".

=== Curriculum ===
The assumed course of study for Sylvan Hills students is the Smart Core curriculum, which is the Arkansas' college and career-ready curriculum for high school students. For the 2011–2013 school years, Sylvan Hills became a participant in the Arkansas Leadership Academy School Support Program to provide support to low performing schools designated by the Arkansas Department of Education as being in school improvement based on the requirements of the No Child Left Behind Act.

Since fall 2013, Sylvan Hills is a part of the Arkansas Advanced Initiative for Mathematics and Sciences (AAIMS), a member of the National Math and Science Initiative, to strengthen the teaching of Advanced Placement mathematics, science, and English courses.

Starting in 2017, Sylvan Hills High School applied and was selected for a four-year term as an ADE School of Innovation (SOI). The SOI goal is to implement a personalized learning model, which will provide flexible, student-centered, nurturing environments focused on placing the highest priority on student learning, mastery of content, and school to career connections based on students’ interests. As part of the SOI program outcomes, Sylvan Hills has begun entering into partnerships with the University of Arkansas at Little Rock (UALR) and Pulaski Technical College (UA–PTC) to provide students access to concurrent enrollment offerings and industry credentialed programming that appeal to student interests and better prepare them for career endeavors.

Students may choose between regular classes and exams and numerous Advanced Placement (AP) classes with college-level curriculum and examinations for college credit.

Career and technical education offerings including building trades, cosmetology, and Cisco Systems network training, which can lead to state-licensure and professional certification. According to the Arkansas Department of Career Education (ACE), the Standards of Accreditation of Public Schools require that each high school offer three programs of career and technical education study in three different occupational pathway areas. Sylvan Hills High School offered 6 programs of study in 6 different pathways, including:

- Family & Community Services: Family & Consumer Sciences Education
- Maintenance, Installation & Repair: Industrial Equipment Maintenance
- Marketing Research: Marketing Technology & Research
- Network Systems: Computer Engineering
- Personal Care Services: Cosmetology (in partnership with Paul Mitchell Schools)
- Web and Digital Communications: Digital Communications

Since 2003, Sylvan Hills offers EAST (Environmental and Spatial Technology) classes, which are designed to help the school and community using state-of-the-art technology. In 2008 and 2009, Sylvan Hills was recognized as an EAST Founder's Award Finalist. Sylvan Hills serves special needs students with a full range of special education courses. The school has produced students who have received the AP Scholar with Honor award, National Merit Scholars, Finalist and Semifinalist honors, and Arkansas Governor's School and Boys/Girls State attendance.

Additionally, Sylvan Hills maintains a cadre of career teaching professionals with several educators qualified as National Board Certified Teachers. Throughout its history, the school's faculty have garnered various awards including the 1977 Southern States Communication Association (SSCA) Speech Teacher of the Year and 1988 Marketing Education Teacher of the Year awards.

In 2021, Sylvan Hills High School Jobs for America's Graduates (JAG) Program was recognized for achieving the national organization’s 5-of-5 Award; one of only 25 programs across the nation.

=== Publications ===
Sylvan Hills students may take classes in journalism and creative writing to produce the award-winning online and print publications. Sylvan Hills is a member of the Arkansas Scholastic Press Association (ASPA), which provides an opportunity to compete in individual and school contests, seminars, and workshops. ASPA has awarded its Adviser of the Year to school educators including Dixie Martin (1986), Allen Loibner-Waitkus (2002) and Tonia Weatherford, NBCT, CJE (2014). In 1994, Martin received the Arkansas Press Association (APA) with the APA's Journalism Educator Award to recognize her years of dedication and the quality of the publications.

==== The Banner ====
First published during the 1970–71 school year, the student newspaper (The Banner) once served as the state's only high school weekly newspaper. Several students have won national Quill and Scroll Gold Key awards for newspaper feature articles, along with serving as state officers and capturing state-level awards at the annual ASPA convention, including the All-Arkansas Award (Superior) rating. In recent years, the print publication has been supplemented with an online edition.

==== The Bruin ====
Since 1956, the school's yearbook (The Bruin) has served as an annual print publication that chronicles the students, teachers and staff activities throughout the school year. Throughout the years, the publication has garnered All-Arkansas Superior and Excellent awards while student writers and photographers have won awards in individual competitions for onsite contests and for published works in the yearbook at the annual ASPA convention.

==== The Breeze ====
The school maintains a literary magazine (The Breeze), which showcases student works in poetry, artwork, photographs and creative writing. In 1985 and 1986, the Breeze was awarded Excellent and Superior awards, respectively, by the National Council of Teachers of English Program to Recognize Excellence in Student Literary Magazines (PRESLM).

=== Visual and performing arts ===
Students may participate in various creative writing, visual, musical, and performing arts programs.

==== Choir programs ====
The school's choir programs consist of various formats including a cappella choir, male chorus and barbershop quartet, female chorus and beautyshop quartet.

Concert Choir has garnered several Division I (Superior) ratings at regional and state choir festivals administered by the Arkansas Choral Directors Association (ArkCDA). In 2005 and 2009, the Male Chorus received the Best in Class award at the Arkansas State Choral Festival. The Sylvan Hills 9–10 Girls have won four consecutive Best in Class for the 5A Female Chorus – Medium competition at the 2013 through 2016 state festivals.

The program is led by Elaine Harris (NBCT), who in 1998 and again in 2011, was awarded the Senior High Choir Director of the Year Award from the ArkCDA Central Region.

==== Theatre programs ====
Sylvan Hills theater program educators lead various classes and theatrical productions involving drama and stagecraft that are produced by students and held at the school's Jim Burgett Auditorium and beyond. In 2010, Sylvan Hills' Thespian Troupe 2945 were invited to perform on the main stage of International Thespian Festival 2010 after receiving multiple awards for Fences at the thespian festival sponsored by the Arkansas Chapter of the Educational Theatre Association (EdTA).

=== Honor societies ===
Honor society organizations that academically qualified students draw participation include math (Mu Alpha Theta); science (Science National Honor Society (SNHS)); vocal and instrumental music (Tri-M Music Honor Society); journalism (Quill and Scroll Society); drama (International Thespian Society); and Spanish language (Sociedad Honoraria Hispánica), in addition to National Honor Society and National Beta Club.

== Extracurricular activities ==
The Sylvan Hills High School mascot is the bear with blue and white serving as the school colors.

=== Athletics ===
Individual and team sports are primarily sanctioned by the Arkansas Activities Association.

Sports

Fall Sports	Winter Sports	Spring Sports
Football	Basketball (Boys/Girls)	Baseball
Tennis (Boys/Girls)	Bowling (Boys/Girls)	Fastpitch Softball
Volleyball	Swimming (Boys/Girls)	Track and Field (Boys/Girls)
Golf (Boys/Girls)	Soccer (Boys/Girls)	Weightlifting
Cross Country (Boys/Girls)	Competitive Cheer
	Wrestling (Boys/Girls)

The Sylvan Hills Bears and Lady Bears participate in 6A East for football and in the 5A-Central conference for all other sports.

Starting with the 2014–15 school year, Bill Blackwood Field at Bears Stadium shifted from natural grass to synthetic turf and replaced track surfaces.

In October 2016, the football game between Sylvan Hills and Pulaski Academy was the nation’s first high school football game aired in real-time via Facebook Live.

=== Championship seasons ===
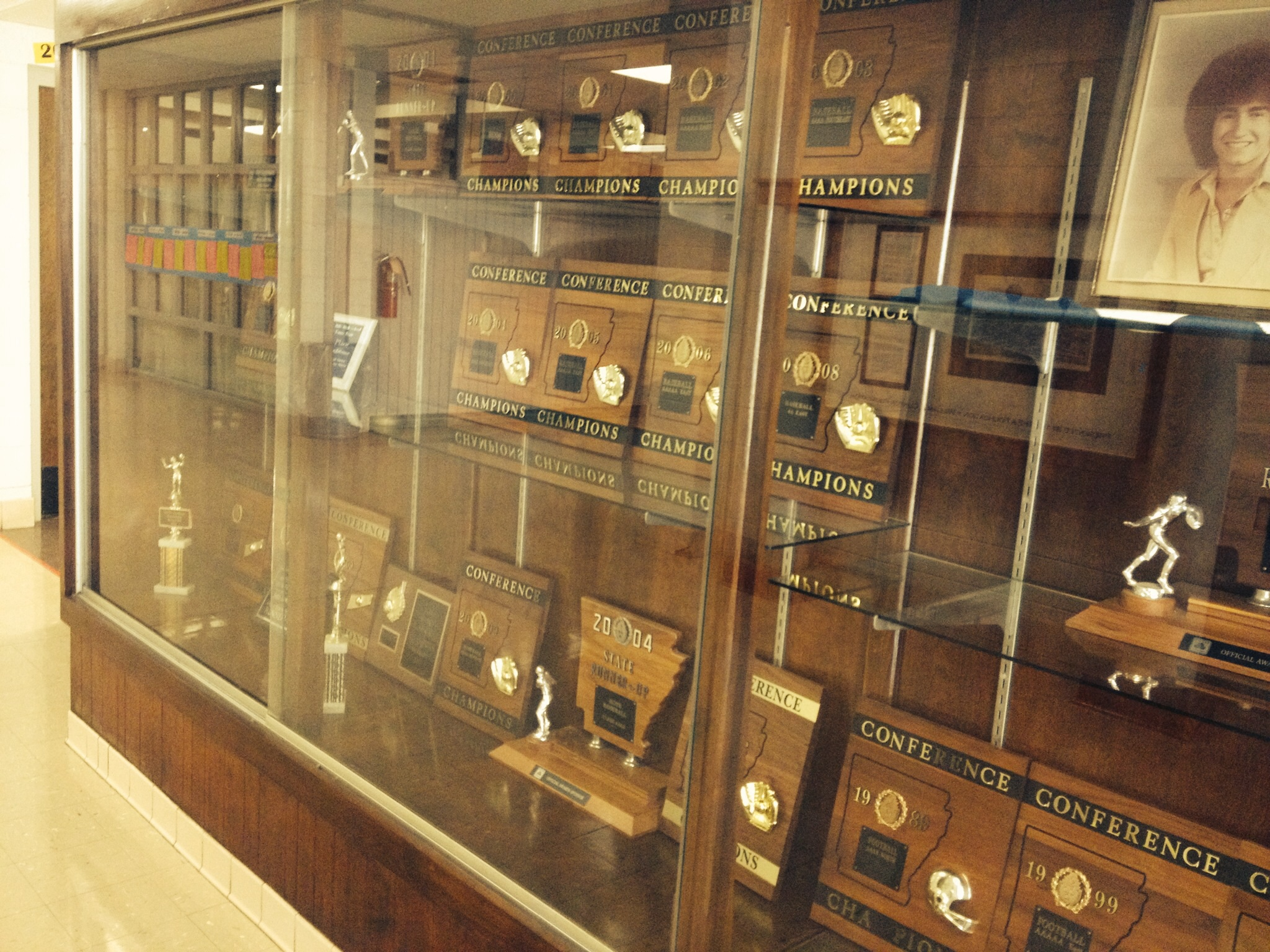
Sylvan Hills High School – Trophy Case

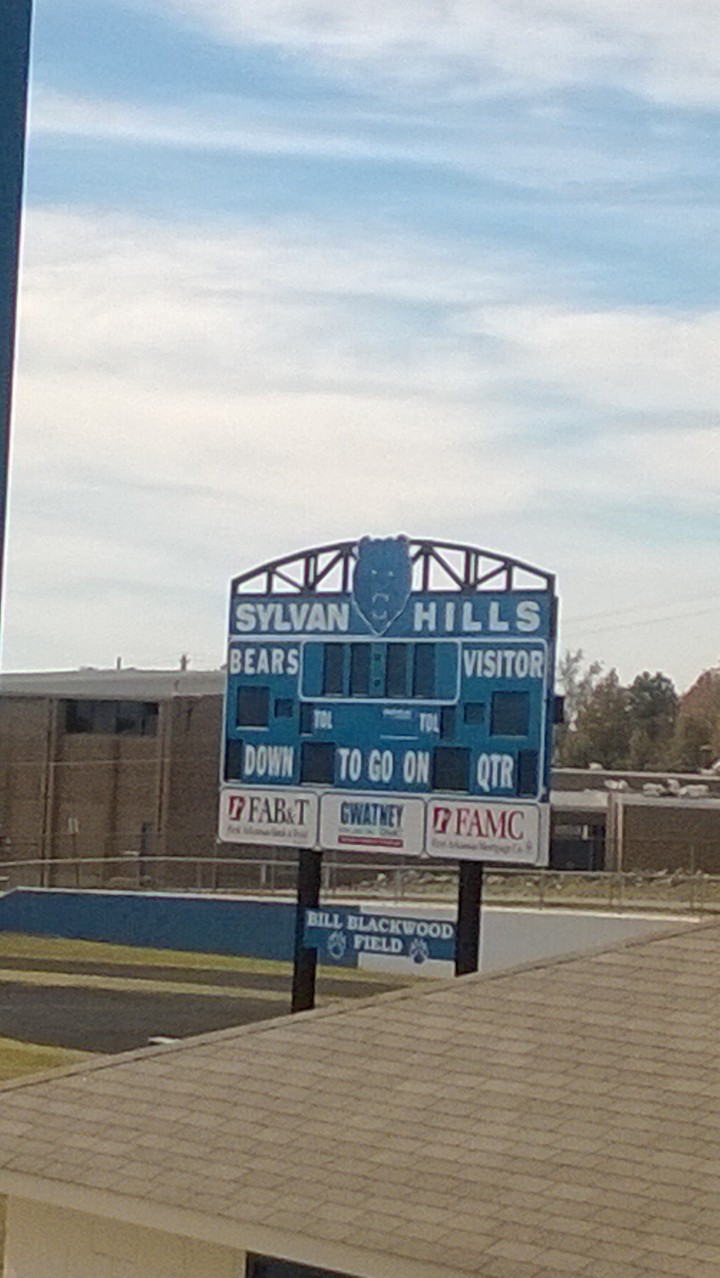
Bill Blackwood Field scoreboard at Bear Stadium

Sylvan Hills Bears teams have won championships in several sports and disciplines. It has won eight state baseball championships in 44 tournaments, with a state-record 64 victories. Its players have won nine Arkansas Baseball State Tournament MVP trophies. SHHS has hoisted six girls' track and field, two boys' golf, two girls' golf, one football, one boys' basketball, one slow-pitch softball, and one volleyball state championships, along with one state and multiple national cheerleading titles.

State Championships				State Runner-ups
Season	Sport/Activity	Number of Championships	Year	Year
Fall	Football	1	1980 (AAAA)	2002 (AAAA)
Fall	Golf, Boys'	2	1968 (AA), 1977 (AAA)	2006 (6A), 2007 (6A)
Fall	Golf, Girls'	2	1979, 1981	
Fall	Volleyball	1	1977 (AAAA)	
Winter	Basketball, Boys'	1	2011–12 (5A)	2003–04 (AAAA), 2010–11 (5A)
Winter	Competitive Cheer	1	2009–10 (5A)	2015–16 (5A)
Winter	Wrestling, Girls'	0		2022–23 (1A–5A)
Spring	Baseball	8	1965, 1974, 1978, 1981, 2003, 2005, 2008, 2018	1959, 1961, 1972, 2004, 2016 (5A)
Spring	Softball	1	2000 (AAAAA)	2001 (AAAAA)
Spring	Track and Field, Girls'	7	2003, 2004, 2017, 2018, 2019 (outdoor), 2019 (indoor), 2022 (indoor)	
Total		24		14

==== Football ====
Football state championships
School Year (Fall)	Winning team	Losing team	Class	Location (all in Arkansas)	Record
1980	Sylvan Hills (24)	Springdale (0)	AAAA	Thone Stadium at Buerkle Field, Arkansas Tech University	11–0–1
2002	Stuttgart (49)	Sylvan Hills (32)	AAAA	War Memorial Stadium	10–4

Home football games and track and field meets are held at Bill Blackwood Field at Bears Stadium, which is named for a long-time school supporter, bus driver and official scorer.

==== Golf ====
In 2006 and 2007, the boys' golf team finished as the Class 6A state runner-up. In 2007, the boys' team lost the Class 6A team title in a playoff hole to Mountain Home. The girls' team won the state championships in 1979 and 1981.

==== Basketball ====
Basketball state championships
School Year (Spring)	Winning team	Losing team	Class	Location (all in Arkansas)
2004	Wilbur D. Mills (58)	Sylvan Hills (53)	AAAA	Alltel Arena, North Little Rock
2011	Alma (80)	Sylvan Hills (64)	5A	Summit Arena, Hot Springs
2012	Sylvan Hills (59)	Wilbur D. Mills (54)	5A	Summit Arena, Hot Springs

The boys basketball team has played in three state championship games, winning the school’s only title in 2012. In 2011 and 2012, Archie Goodwin was selected as the Gatorade Arkansas Boys' Basketball Player of the Year. In 2021, Nick Smith Jr. (NBA drafted in 2023) was selected as Gatorade Arkansas Boys' Basketball Player of the Year his junior season before transferring out.

In the 1980s–1990s, the Sylvan Hills gymnasium and basketball court served as home to wheelchair basketball coach Harry Vines and his 5-time national champion Arkansas Rollin' Razorbacks.

==== Baseball ====
Baseball state championships
School Year	Winning team	Losing team	Class
1959	Pine Bluff	Sylvan Hills	Overall
1961	Pine Bluff	Sylvan Hills	Overall
1965	Sylvan Hills (2)	Bay (1)	Overall
1972	Junction City (4)	Sylvan Hills (3)	Seminfinals
1974	Sylvan Hills (6)	Camden Fairview (3)	Overall
1978	Sylvan Hills (8)	Pine Bluff (2)	AAA
1981	Sylvan Hills		AAA
2003	Sylvan Hills		AAAA
2004	Batesville (4)	Sylvan Hills (3)	AAAA
2005	Sylvan Hills (8)	Jonesboro (5)	AAAAA
2008	Sylvan Hills (5)	Watson Chapel (4)	6A
2016	Magnolia (4)	Sylvan Hills (1)	5A
2018	Sylvan Hills (1)	Watson Chapel (0)	5A

The Bears baseball team has been to thirteen state championship games, winning the state title eight times, including 1965, 1974 (statewide); 1978, 1981 (Class AAA), 2003 (Class AAAA), 2005 (Class AAAAA), 2008 (Class 6A), and 2018 (Class 5A). In 1978, Kevin McReynolds led the Bears to the Class AAA state baseball championship and was named Arkansas Baseball Player of the Year.

Located adjacent to the high school campus and leveraged by the school is the Kevin McReynolds Sports Complex, named after a major league baseball player who attended Sylvan Hills High School, is a 180 acres (73 ha) park featuring seven baseball fields, five softball fields, a soccer field, three concession stands, playgrounds, pavilions, and covered bleachers.

==== Track and field ====
Since 2007, Jeff Henderson maintains the state high school decathlon record in the 100 meter dash with his 10.84 second run. In 2024, junior Josiah Rainey won 1st place at the Arkansas Class 5A State Championships in the 100 and 200 meter dash. He followed those performances and shattered the previous state record (10.50 seconds) in the 100 meter dash with a time of 10.46 seconds, and also won the 200 meter dash at the 2024 Arkansas Meet of Champions.

The girls track and field teams are a 7-time champion garnering indoor and outdoor championships in 2003, 2004, 2017, 2018, 2019 (outdoor), 2019 (indoor), and 2022 (indoor).

==== Competitive cheer ====
Since the school has opened, Sylvan Hills cheerleading and dance teams have been supporting interscholastic teams. Since the 1999–2000 school year, Sylvan Hills has been producing competitive cheer teams against state and national competition and becoming the National Cheerleaders Association (NCA) National Cheerleading Champion (Super Large Varsity).

Tragedy struck the school and the community on March 18, 2004, as three Sylvan Hills cheerleaders were involved in a fatal automobile accident that took their lives at the intersection of Arkansas Highway 89 and Arkansas Highway 5 near Cabot. That same year for 2004–05, Sylvan Hills won the National Cheerleading Champion (Super Large Varsity) division at the American Spirit Championships (ASC). A 3 Cheerleaders Memorial Scholarship has been created to honor their memories.

In 2005–06, the competitive cheer team won the national title sponsored by the World Cheerleading Association (WCA) and its second NCA National Cheerleading Champion (Super Large Varsity) title. In 2009–10, the cheer squad won the Class 5A state cheer championship title.

=== Clubs and traditions ===
As is common throughout the United States, Sylvan Hills students participate in annual events and school dances such as the annual homecoming football game and dance, a Sadie Hawkins dance, a Powderpuff flag football game, the Miss Sylvan Hills pageant, the selection of Top 10 seniors (as selected by staff) and the year-end prom before graduation. For the graduation ceremonies, graduates typically wear academic regalia including blue gowns with blue mortarboard caps and blue-and-white tassels. Honor graduates wear a gold honor cord, students in the top 10% academically wear white gowns, with National Honor Society members wearing gold stoles, Beta Club members with gold tassel, Mu Alpha Theta members with blue cord, and Quill & Scroll members with blue and gold cord.

In recent years, ′Hillside′ students and teacher/mentors have participated in robotic education and competition programs. At the 2018–19 Arkansas VEX Robotics High School State Championship, Sylvan Hills was 1 of 3 tournament finalists and was eligible for the VEX Robotics World Championships.

== Notable people ==
The following are notable people associated with Sylvan Hills High School. If the person was a Sylvan Hills High School student, the number in parentheses indicates the year of graduation; if the person was a faculty or staff member, that person's title and years of association are included:

- Wes Bentley (1996)—Film and television actor; notable roles in Yellowstone, American Beauty and The Hunger Games.
- Billy Bock (Coach, 1971–74)—Inductee, American Baseball Coaches Hall of Fame, National High School Coach of the Century.
- John Burkhalter (1976)—Businessman and politician.
- Josh Cowdery (1997)—Film and television actor, best known for Fantastic Beasts and Where to Find Them
- Ronald A. Foy (1985)–Navy admiral and SEAL
- Archie Goodwin (2012)—Professional basketball player; two-time Arkansas Gatorade Boys Basketball Player of the Year.
- Jeff Henderson (2007)—Athlete, 2016 Olympic long jump gold medalist, Arkansas high school state decathlon record holder in 100-meter dash; 2014, 2016 and 2018 USA Outdoor national champion in long jump.
- Wes Johnson (1990)—Collegiate baseball coach
- Mark Lowery (1975)—Politician; Treasurer of Arkansas
- Kevin McReynolds (1978)—Retired Major League Baseball player and member of National High School Hall of Fame.
- Shekinna Stricklen (Coach, 2023–)—Girl's head basketball coach (2023–present); WNBA player.
- Monica Staggs (1988)—Actress and stunt performer/coordinator.
- Nick Smith Jr. (2022)—Professional basketball player; two-time Arkansas Gatorade Boys Basketball Player of the Year; transferred out after his junior year.
- Terry Tiffee (1997)—Retired Major League Baseball player and Olympic medalist.
- Ashur Tolliver (2006)—Major League Baseball player.
- Jarius Wright (Coach, 2025–)—Football assistant coach; former professional football player.
