= McAlmont, Arkansas =

- CDP
- Location in Pulaski County and the state of Arkansas
- Coordinates: 34°47′33″N 92°11′46″W
- Country: United States
- State: Arkansas
- County: Pulaski

Area
  - Total: 1.57 sq mi (4.07 km^{2})
  - Land: 1.57 sq mi (4.07 km^{2})
  - Water: 0 sq mi (0.00 km^{2})
- Elevation: 276 ft (84 m)

Population (2020)
  - Total: 1,447
  - Density: 920.2/sq mi (355.31/km^{2})
- Time zone: UTC-6 (Central (CST))
  - Summer (DST): UTC-5 (CDT)
- ZIP code: 72117
- Area code: 501
- FIPS code: 05-42350
- GNIS feature ID: 2403267

McAlmont, also referred to as "Mac Side", is a census-designated place (CDP) in Pulaski County, Arkansas, United States. As of the 2020 census, McAlmont had a population of 1,447. The community adjoins eastern North Little Rock, and is part of the Little Rock–North Little Rock–Conway Metropolitan Statistical Area.

According to the United States Census Bureau, the CDP has a total area of 1.6 square miles (4.1 km^{2}), all land.

== Demographics ==
Historical population
| Census | Pop. | Note | %± |
|---|---|---|---|
| 2000 | 1,922 | | — |
| 2010 | 1,873 | | −2.5% |
| 2020 | 1,447 | | −22.7% |
U.S. Decennial Census

=== 2020 census ===
As of the 2020 census, McAlmont had a population of 1,447. The median age was 39.7 years. 26.3% of residents were under the age of 18 and 17.6% of residents were 65 years of age or older. For every 100 females there were 80.2 males, and for every 100 females age 18 and over there were 81.8 males age 18 and over.

100.0% of residents lived in urban areas, while 0.0% lived in rural areas.

There were 624 households in McAlmont, of which 26.4% had children under the age of 18 living in them. Of all households, 19.4% were married-couple households, 30.6% were households with a male householder and no spouse or partner present, and 43.9% were households with a female householder and no spouse or partner present. About 40.1% of all households were made up of individuals and 11.5% had someone living alone who was 65 years of age or older.

There were 790 housing units, of which 21.0% were vacant. The homeowner vacancy rate was 1.2% and the rental vacancy rate was 19.9%.

McAlmont racial composition
| Race | Number | Percentage |
|---|---|---|
| White (non-Hispanic) | 223 | 15.41% |
| Black or African American (non-Hispanic) | 1,121 | 77.47% |
| Native American | 6 | 0.41% |
| Asian | 5 | 0.35% |
| Pacific Islander | 2 | 0.12% |
| Other/Mixed | 37 | 2.56% |
| Hispanic or Latino | 53 | 3.66% |

=== 2000 census ===
As of the census of 2000, there were 1,922 people, 684 households, and 487 families residing in the CDP. The population density was 1,126.7 inhabitants per square mile (435.0/km^{2}). There were 776 housing units at an average density of 454.9 per square mile (175.6/km^{2}). The racial makeup of the CDP was 25.08% White, 70.50% Black or African American, 0.68% Native American, 0.05% Asian, 0.05% Pacific Islander, 0.99% from other races, and 2.65% from two or more races. 1.98% of the population were Hispanic or Latino of any race.

There were 684 households, out of which 29.5% had children under the age of 18 living with them, 38.3% were married couples living together, 24.0% had a female householder with no husband present, and 28.8% were non-families. 24.9% of all households were made up of individuals, and 9.9% had someone living alone who was 65 years of age or older. The average household size was 2.81 and the average family size was 3.37.

In the CDP, the population was spread out, with 29.6% under the age of 18, 8.5% from 18 to 24, 25.7% from 25 to 44, 23.4% from 45 to 64, and 12.8% who were 65 years of age or older. The median age was 35 years. For every 100 females, there were 98.8 males. For every 100 females age 18 and over, there were 94.4 males.

The median income for a household in the CDP was $19,762, and the median income for a family was $27,174. Males had a median income of $30,855 versus $16,549 for females. The per capita income for the CDP was $11,737. About 23.3% of families and 28.1% of the population were below the poverty line, including 45.5% of those under age 18 and 21.8% of those age 65 or over.

== Education ==
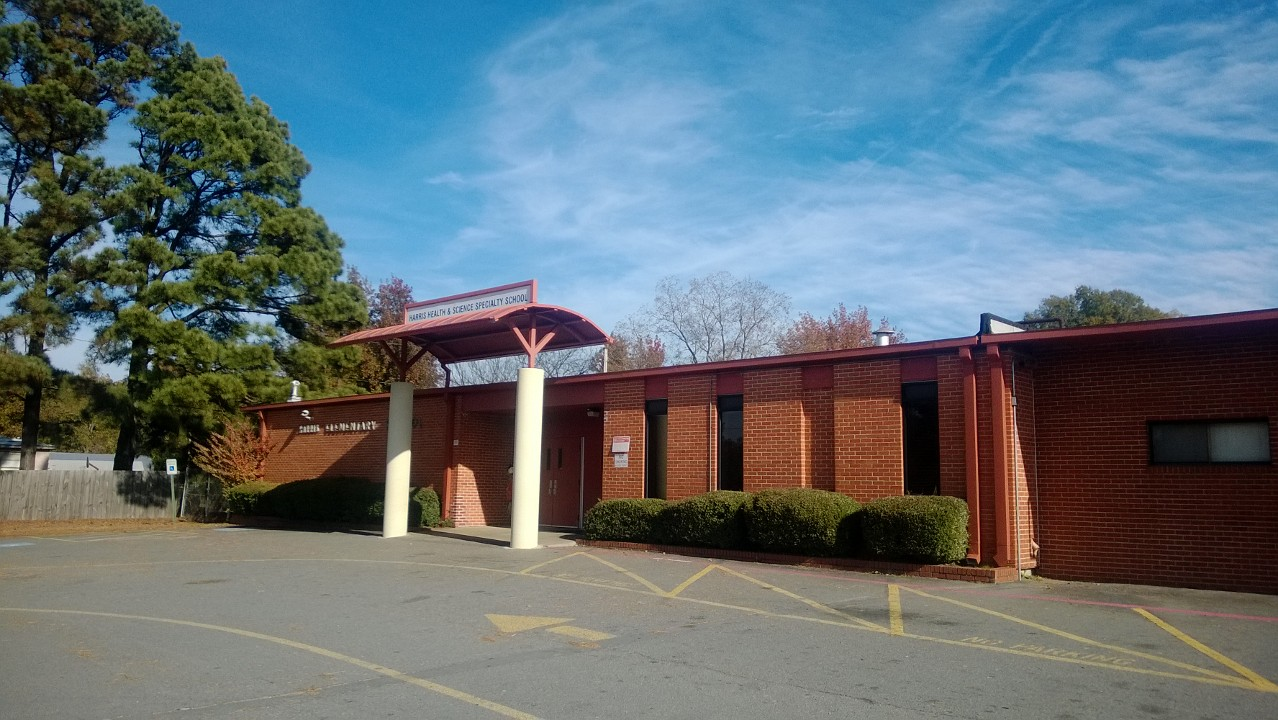
Front entrance to Harris Elementary School in McAlmont

Public education in much of the CDP is provided by the Pulaski County Special School District, which operates Harris Elementary School in McAlmont, All of the Pulaski County SSD part of McAlmont is zoned to Harris Elementary. Much of McAlmont is zoned to Sylvan Hills Middle School and Sylvan Hills High School. Some is zoned to Mills Middle School and Wilbur D. Mills High School.

Prior to 1971, students attended Harris High School, which closed as part of the county's desegregation activities. Harris became an elementary school after 1971.

Some portions of the CDP are served by the North Little Rock School District, which operates North Little Rock High School.

== See also ==
- Sherwood, Arkansas
