= North Little Rock School District =

School district in North Little Rock, Arkansas

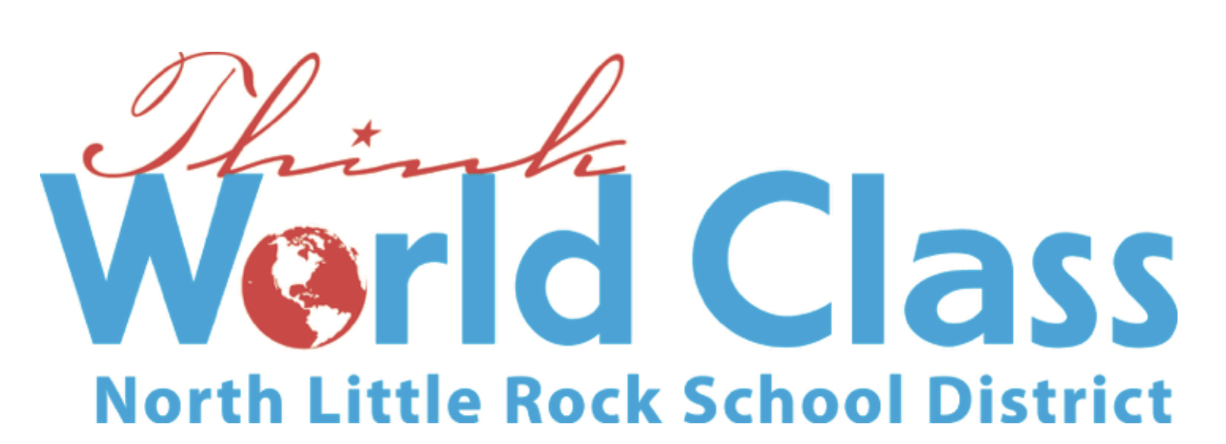

Location
- 2700 Poplar Street; North Little Rock, Arkansas 72114-0687 United States

District information
- Type: Public (government funded)
- Motto: World Class Schools for World Class Students
- Grades: Pre-K - 12
- Superintendent: Gregory Pilewski
- Accreditation: Arkansas Department of Education (ADE)
- Schools: 20
- NCES District ID: 0510680

Students and staff
- Students: 9,400
- Teachers: 619.90 (on FTE basis)
- Student–teacher ratio: 15.16
- Athletic conference: 7A/6A East (2012–14)

Other information
- Graduation Seals: ADE Seal; Arkansas Scholars Seal; Honors Diploma Seal
- High School Courses: Regular; Honors; Pre-AP; Advanced Placement; IB
- Website: nlrsd.org

North Little Rock School District (NLRSD) is a public school district headquartered in North Little Rock, Arkansas, United States.

== History ==
=== LRSD vs. PCSSD (desegregation) ===
The three school districts within the county—Little Rock School District (LRSD), North Little Rock School District (NLRSD), and Pulaski County Special School District (PCSSD)—have been involved in a desegregation case that the courts determined were unconstitutionally segregated and placed under court supervision since 1982. After numerous actions were satisfied, including incorporating those schools within the City of Little Rock boundaries to be unitary with the LRSD, those actions led to the annexation of J. A. Fair High School from PCSSD to LRSD in 1987. In 2007, the courts determined that all actions by LRSD were completed and that court supervision continues until NLRSD and PCSSD actions are completed.

== Schools ==
=== High school ===
The district has one high school, North Little Rock High School, which has grades 9–12. In the school year(2016-2017) the North Little Rock School district opened a new facility for all students 9–12.

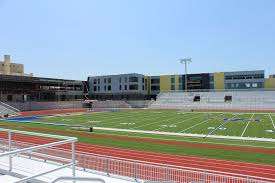
North Little Rock High School Football Field

=== Middle schools ===
- North Little Rock Middle School

=== Elementary schools ===
- Amboy
- Boone Park
- Crestwood
- Glenview
- Indian Hills
- Lakewood
- Meadow Park
- Ridge Road
- North Little Rock 6 Academy of Agricultural and Veterinary Sciences
- Pike View Early Childhood Center

=== Former schools ===
- Scipio Jones High School, the segregated public school for black children, was established in 1909 and disestablished in 1970.
- Argenta(Closed)
- Belwood (Closed)
- Central Elementary (Closed)
- Lynch Drive (Closed)
- North Heights (Closed)
- Park Hill (Closed)
- Redwood (No longer a school)
- Riverside(Closed)

=== Pre-Kindergarten schools ===
- Pike View Early Childhood Center

=== Alternative Education ===
- North Little Rock Academy

== School uniforms ==
All K-8 students and students at NLR Academy are required to wear school uniforms.
