= Quigley Stadium (Little Rock) =

High school football stadium in Arkansas, U.S.

Earl F. Quigley Stadium at Verizon Wireless Field
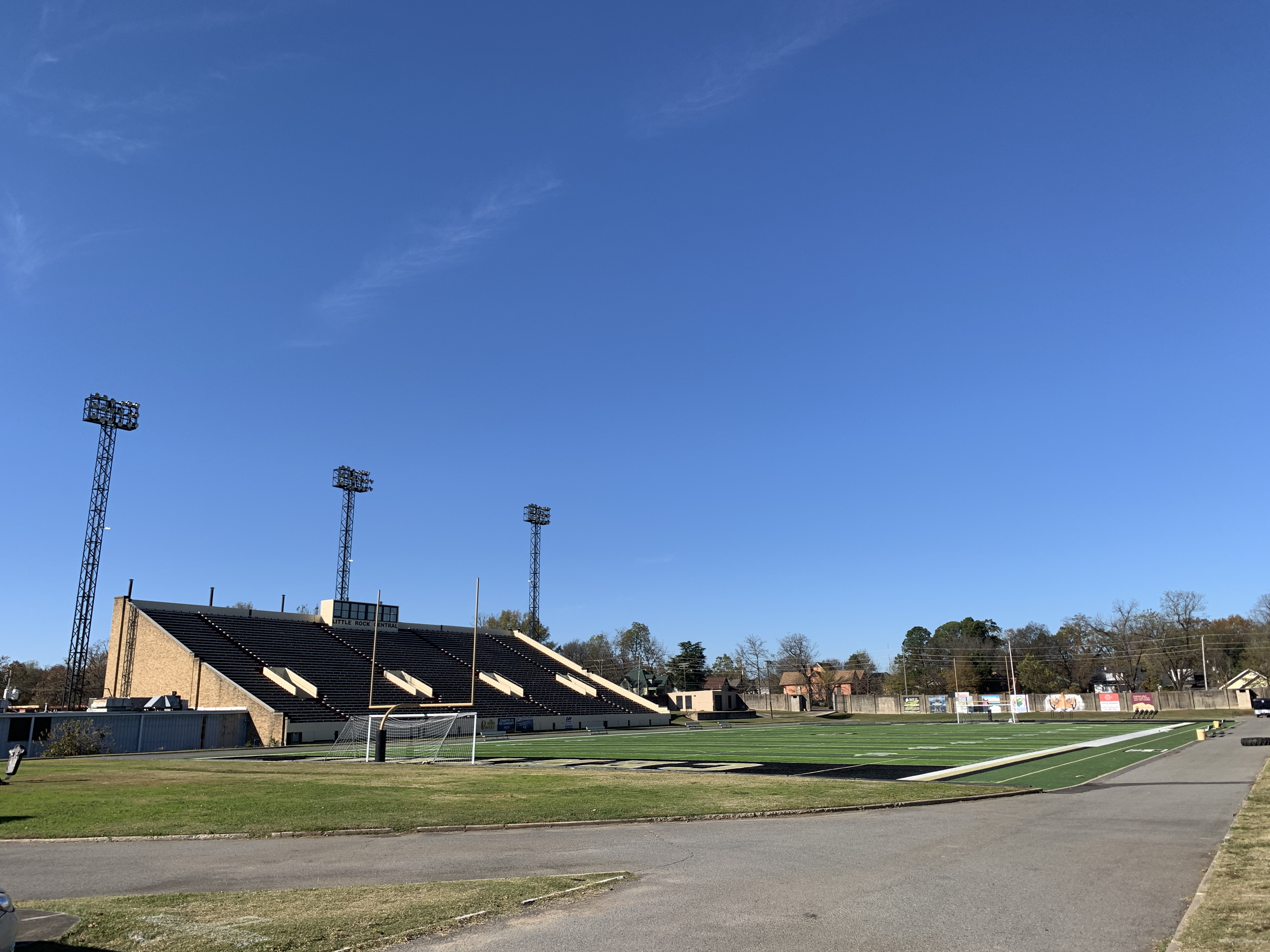
- Interactive map of Earl F. Quigley Stadium at Verizon Wireless Field
- Former names: Kavanaugh Stadium
- Location: Little Rock Central High School; Little Rock, Arkansas
- Coordinates: 34°44′12.84″N 92°18′6.24″W
- Owner: Little Rock School District
- Capacity: 15,000
- Surface: Artificial turf (2009–present); Natural grass (1936–2008)

Construction
- Groundbreaking: 1935
- Opened: 1936
- Renovated: 2009

Tenants
- Little Rock Central High School (AAA) (1936–present); Arkansas Razorbacks football (NCAA) (1932–1947); Arkansas Baptist College football (NAIA) (2022–present)

Quigley Stadium is a football stadium used by Little Rock Central High School. Prior to its 1930s remodeling, the area was known as Kavanaugh Field and was the home field of the Little Rock Travelers baseball team.

The stadium was built by the Works Progress Administration in 1936 and seats 15,000. At that time it was the largest stadium in the state of Arkansas. It has been used by many high school and college football teams, including the University of Arkansas at Fayetteville, Razorbacks (prior to 1948) and the Philander Smith College Panthers.

In 2009, the field was replaced with artificial turf. Verizon Wireless donated much of the money for the renovation, and the stadium was renamed Quigley–Cox Stadium at Verizon Wireless Field.

== Earl Quigley ==
Earl Quigley served as head coach at Little Rock High School (now known as, Little Rock Central). He coached the Tigers from 1914 through 1946 for football, basketball, track & field, and baseball with an overall career record of 760 wins, 190 losses and 11 ties.

In 22 years, his football teams won 149 games, lost 56 and tied 11. As head track and field coach, he led the Tigers to 18 consecutive state championships, the second longest streak in the nation, and an overall track meet record of 98–2 that included 97 straight wins. Later, Quigley was named athletic director and in 1957, Tiger Stadium was renamed Quigley Stadium to honor his outstanding contributions to high school athletics.

Quigley also coached baseball and basketball from 1916 to 1930. He later served as business manager of the Arkansas Travelers.

=== Honors and awards ===
- Inductee, Arkansas Sports Hall of Fame (Class of 1961)
- Inductee, Arkansas High School Coaches Association (AHSCA) Hall of Fame (Class of 1995)
- Inductee, Arkansas Track and Field Hall of Fame (Class of 1995)
- Inductee, Arkansas High School Athletic Administrators Association (AHSAAA) Hall of Fame (Class of 2011)
