= Booker T. Washington High School, (Texarkana, Arkansas) =

Former Black School in Texarkana, Arkansas

Booker T Washington High School was a school for Black children in Texarkana, Arkansas before school integration.

== Early Black education in Texarkana ==
Before the integration of public schools in Arkansas, Texarkana had several black learning institutions. These included Orr School, College Hill School, and Ash Street High School. Orr School was funded by donations from a prominent Texarkana family to help Black Children learn reading, writing and arithmetic. Originally a two-story building was created, but after a fire it was rebuilt as a single floor building. Downing School, later renamed College Hill School was another of these institutions. In 1908 this school moved from College Hill to Draughn Avenue where a frame building was erected for grades 1-4. In 1923 children in grades 1-11 were being educated in Ash Street School at 816 Ash Street in the first story of a two story building.

In 1924, the board purchased some rural land at the intersection of Pinehurst and Preston. The school was housed there in an old three-room shotgun house, which was destroyed in a fire a few months later. After the fire, classes were held in the basement of St. James Baptist Church, which had dirt floors. In 1925 construction of Booker T. Washington High School commenced with a mix of funding from local contributions and the Rosenwald Fund.

In 1930, the school added the sports of football and basketball, using Lions as the team nickname.

Washington High School was consolidated into Arkansas High School in the fall of 1968.

== Notable people ==
- Willie Davis, pro football hall-of-fame player, businessman
- Sharon Fort, substance abuse counselor and first Black woman to join the Arkansas Society Daughters of the American Revolution.
- Silas Herbert Hunt, first Black man to attend the University of Arkansas School of Law.
