= Arkansas Sports Hall of Fame =

- Established: 1959
- Location: 3 Simmons Bank Arena Way; North Little Rock, Arkansas 72114
- Type: Sports
- Number of inductees: Approx 5 per year
- President: Andrew Meadors
- Website: www.arksportshalloffame.com

The Arkansas Sports Hall of Fame is the hall of fame and museum for sports in Arkansas, United States. The Hall of Fame inducted its first class in 1959. The Hall's museum is located on the west end of the Simmons Bank Arena in North Little Rock, Arkansas.

The Hall showcases men, women and teams from a variety of sports ranging from football to fishing and includes inductees from each of the 75 counties in Arkansas.

== List of inductees ==
Year	Name	Arkansas high school affiliation	Arkansas college affiliation	Arkansas pro (or amateur) affiliation
1959	Bill Dickey		Little Rock College	Little Rock Travelers
1959	Jim Lee Howell		University of Arkansas	
1959	Ivan Grove	Arkansas City HS	Hendrix College	
1959	Hazel Walker			Little Rock Lewis & Norwood Flyers, El Dorado Oilers
1959	Wear Schoonover	Pocahontas HS	University of Arkansas	
1960	Jim Benton	Fordyce HS (coach)	Arkansas A&M	
1960	Travis Jackson		Ouachita Baptist University	Little Rock Travelers
1960	Jimmy Haygood		Henderson State University	
1960	John Barnhill		University of Arkansas	
1960	Don Hutson	Pine Bluff HS		
1960	Steve Creekmore		University of Arkansas	
1961	Morley Jennings		Ouachita Baptist University	
1961	Earl Quigley	Little Rock HS		
1961	Lon Warneke	Mount Ida HS		
1961	Paul Runyan			
1961	Hugo Bezdek		University of Arkansas	Fort Smith Twins
1962	John Tucker		Arkansas Tech University	
1962	Carey Selph		Ouachita Baptist University	Fort Smith Twins
1962	John Henry (Rube) Roberson			Little Rock Travelers; Arkansas Travelers
1962	Schoolboy Rowe			
1962	Ray Winder			Little Rock Travelers; Arkansas Travelers
1963	Dutch Harrison			
1963	George Cole	Warren HS	University of Arkansas; University of the Ozarks	
1963	Clyde Scott	Smackover HS	University of Arkansas; University of the Ozarks	
1963	Russell May	Little Rock HS		
1972	Maurice Britt	Lonoke HS	University of Arkansas	
1996	Billy Bock	Subiaco Academy St. Anne's Academy; Arkansas HS; Sylvan Hills HS; Pine Bluff HS	University of the Ozarks Henderson State University	
1996	Kevin McReynolds	Sylvan Hills HS	University of Arkansas	
2014	Harry Vines	Little Rock Central HS		Arkansas Rollin' Razorbacks
2018	Shawn Andrews		University of Arkansas	
2019	Denny Flynn	County Line HS	University of Arkansas	
2021	Kevin Kelley	Pulaski Academy		
2022	Tommy Brasher	El Dorado HS; Hot Springs HS (head coach)	University of Arkansas	

Other inductees include:

- Ron Calcagni
- Leon Campbell
- George Cole
- Walt Coleman
- Ben Cowins
- Todd Day
- Quinn Grovey
- Ray Hamilton
- Ed Hamm
- John Hoffman
- Cliff Lee
- Haeng Ung Lee
- Lee Mayberry
- Leslie O'Neal
- Gene Ratliff
- Ulysses Reed
- Jack Robbins
- Brooks Robinson
- Billy Ray Smith, Sr.
- Barry Switzer
- R. C. Thielemann
- Scotty Thurman
- Corliss Williamson
