= Silas Herbert Hunt =

Silas Hunt
- Born: Silas Herbert Hunt; March 1, 1922 near Ashdown, Arkansas
- Died: April 22, 1949 (aged 27); Springfield, Missouri
- Education: Arkansas Mechanical, Agricultural and Normal; University of Arkansas
- Known for: Key figure in the Southern civil rights movement

Silas Herbert Hunt (March 1, 1922 – April 22, 1949) was a U.S. veteran of World War II who became the first African American student to enroll in a white Southern university since the Reconstruction era. He enrolled in the University of Arkansas School of Law on Feb. 2, 1948, breaking the color barrier in higher education and starting integration of colleges and universities in the South.

== Early life ==
Hunt was born near Ashdown, Arkansas, the son of Jessie Gulley Moton and R.D. Hunt. His family moved to Texarkana, Arkansas, in 1936 when he was 14, and he attended Booker T. Washington High School. He was president of the student council and a member of the debate team, graduating in 1941 as the class salutatorian.

== Military career ==
He enrolled at Arkansas Agricultural, Mechanical & Normal College in Pine Bluff, but his studies were cut short when he enlisted in the U.S. Army in the fall of 1942 for service during World War II. He was assigned to Company C of the 732nd Field Artillery Battalion, which was redesignated as part the 1695th Engineer Combat Battalion. The battalion was based at Fort Picket, where they trained in road and bridge building as well as combat principles. The battalion was assigned to the XVIII Corps, and Hunt was promoted to sergeant prior to leaving for Europe.

The battalion shipped to England in October 1944, arriving at Newport, Wales, on Nov. 2 and Companies B and C traveled to Ivybridge, England, where training related to Bailey Bridges continued until early January. The battalion moved onto continental Europe on Jan. 9 and, as a result of a transportation mistake, ended up on the French-Belgian border amid the latter stages of the Battle of the Bulge. Hunt was seriously wounded during this period and was evacuated to an English hospital. He was honorably discharged on March 7, 1946.

== Arkansas AM&N ==
After the war, Hunt returned to Arkansas AM&N to complete his degree. Prior to the war, he worked several jobs to pay for college but afterward earned scholarships to pay for the rest of his undergraduate education. He graduated in 1947 with a Bachelor of Arts in English.

At the time, Arkansas like many Southern universities, offered to pay for schooling for African American students who wanted to attend out-of-state graduate or professional programs not being offered to them in the state. Hunt initially planned to take advantage of that policy, applying and being accepted to the Indiana University School of Law, but the actions of a classmate, Ada Lois Sipuel, caused him to reconsider. Sipuel had applied to the all-white University of Oklahoma College of Law in 1946. She was turned down because of race and she subsequently sued the university. Her case came before the U.S. Supreme Court in early 1948, and it ruled in her favor on January 12. She didn't start classes until the next year, but the case had an effect on Hunt, who sought admission to the University of Arkansas rather than go to Indiana.

== University of Arkansas ==
=== Desegregation ===
Originally known as the Arkansas Industrial University, the University of Arkansas enrolled at least one and possibly up to three Black students during the Reconstruction era, in 1872 and 1873, its first two years of operation. James McGahee of Augusta, Arkansas enrolled within about two weeks of the university's opening. The university's board of trustees, which debated who should be allowed to enroll, voted to open the institution to all "regardless of sex, sect or race." By the end of 1873, though, the name of McGahee no longer appeared in the university's rolls of students. The opening of a Branch Normal College in Pine Bluff, Arkansas, and the end of Reconstruction in the state appear to have dissuaded Black students from trying to enroll at the Fayetteville campus for the next 55 years.

In 1938, Edward W. Jacko of Little Rock submitted an application, but it was turned down, ostensibly because his undergraduate degree from Talladega College was from an institution that wasn't properly accredited.

In 1946, L. Clifford Davis sought admission to the University of Arkansas School of Law. He had been taking law classes at Howard University but believed the University of Arkansas would be less expensive. His application was turned down, the Arkansas School of Law reported, because his admission materials were incomplete. Davis determined to reapply in 1948, letting the dean of the School of Law, Robert A. Leflar, know of his intention. Leflar consulted with the president of the university, members of the board of trustees, and the governor, advising them that the university would very likely face legal action if it refused admission again and recommending a gradual implementation of integration.

On January 30, 1948, the university announced through state media that it would allow qualified black students to be admitted to the university. Leflar anticipated that Davis would apply, but Davis didn't approve of the policies that would separate black and white law students. Black and white students would be expected to attend separate classes, use separate restrooms and access library materials separately.

Instead of Davis, though, Hunt arrived on campus along with Wiley A Branton, who wanted to enroll in the undergraduate business college; Harold Flowers, a lawyer from Pine Bluff; and Geleve Grice, a photographer. A small crowd of university students gathered outside the law building, but no reports of protest were noted. Branton said that a few students approached their group to shake hands and wish them well. The student newspaper put out a special edition about the enrollment and included an article relating student views about Hunt's enrollment, the larger proportion of which supported his enrollment.

Dean Leflar reviewed Hunt's academic record and admitted him to the School of Law. Because undergraduate programs were offered by AM&N, Branton was refused undergraduate admission. He returned to the university two years later for his law degree.

=== Classwork ===
Hunt attended segregated law classes, meeting with faculty members in a basement office of the Law School building. Law professors taught a class of white students upstairs and then went downstairs to repeat the class for Hunt. Three to five white students began going downstairs to attend classes with him, partly to show solidarity with his enrollment and partly because the smaller class allowed more access to the professors.

Hunt boarded with an African American family near downtown Fayetteville and walked about a mile and a half to campus each day.

He attended the full spring semester and part of a summer session. In late July 1948, he suffered a hemorrhage brought on by pulmonary tuberculosis, requiring him to withdraw from school. He died in April 1949 at the veterans hospital in Springfield, Missouri.

== Legacy ==
In the fall of 1948, Jackie Shropshire of Little Rock became the second African American student to enroll in the University of Arkansas School of Law. Edith Irby Jones enrolled in the university's medical school in 1948, and Benjamin Franklin Lever enrolled in a graduate program in agronomy in 1949. All three graduated in 1951. The university integrated its undergraduate colleges the same year, although segregation of housing and athletic programs continued into the 1960s.

Hunt's pioneering enrollment is commemorated on the University of Arkansas campus with a sculpture near the location of the old Law School building, now the site of the university's Student Success Center. The university's admissions building was named in honor of him, and the university established the Silas H. Hunt Legacy Award, recognizing African American faculty and alumni for significant contributions to the community, state or nation. The university posthumously awarded Hunt a law degree in 2008 on the 60th anniversary of his enrollment.

Hunt's admission set the stage for African American students to seek enrollment in white public universities across the South. In 1950, a federal court required the University of Virginia to admit Gregory Swanson, who faced hostility on campus and left after a year. North Carolina's School of Law followed the next year, and Tennessee desegregated by 1952, both due to court rulings. Louisiana State University enrolled A.P. Tureaud, Jr., in 1953. Universities in Georgia, Alabama, South Carolina, and Mississippi put off integration until the 1960s.
