= Texarkana School District =

Texarkana School District may refer to:

- Texarkana Arkansas School District
- Texarkana Independent School District (Texas)
