= Genoa Central High School =

Location
- 12472 State Hwy 196; Texarkana, Arkansas 71854; United States; 33°22′24″N 93°52′27″W

Information
- Type: Public secondary
- School district: Genoa Central School District
- NCES District ID: 0504110
- CEEB code: 040870
- NCES School ID: 05041100152
- Faculty: 41.33 (on FTE basis)
- Grades: 10-12
- Student to teacher ratio: 6.36
- Colors: Green and white
- Athletics conference: 4A 7 (2024-25)
- Mascot: Dragon
- Team name: Genoa Central Dragons
- Website: dragons1.k12.ar.us

Genoa Central High School is a secondary school in Texarkana, Arkansas, United States. It is one of two public high schools in Texarkana; the other is Arkansas High School and it is one of three high schools in Miller County and the sole high school in the Genoa Central School District.

== Curriculum ==
The assumed course of study follows the Smart Core curriculum developed by the Arkansas Department of Education, which requires students to complete at least 22 units to graduate. Students complete regular courses and exams and may self-select advanced placement (AP) coursework and exams with the opportunity for college credit. The school is accredited by the Arkansas Department of Education.

== Athletics ==
The Genoa Central High School mascot is the Dragon with green and white serving as its school colors.

For 2012–14, the Genoa Central Dragons compete in the 3A Region 7 East Conference under the Arkansas Activities Association (AAA) administration. Interscholastic activities include football (boys/girls), cross country (boys/girls), basketball (boys/girls), baseball, softball, and track (boys/girls). Genoa Central has a fishing team that competes in events as part of the S.A.F. (Student Angler Federation) sponsored by The Bass Federation.

- Cross country: The girls cross country team won consecutive state cross country championships in 2005, 2006, 2013, 2015 and 2016.
- Track and field: The girls track and field team won a state track championship in 2006.
- Baseball: The baseball team won 3A state baseball championships in 2012 and 2014.
