= Ray Winder Field =

Baseball park in Little Rock, Arkansas

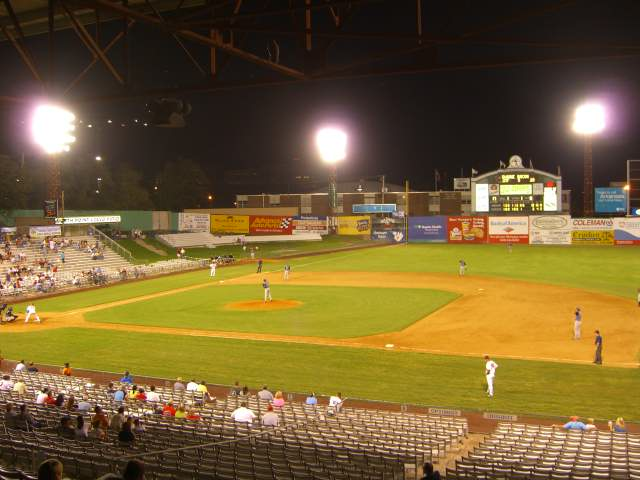
- Travelers game against the Tulsa Drillers in August 2006.
- Interactive map of Ray Winder Field
- Former names: Traveler Field (1932-1966)
- Location: 400 Broadway Street; Little Rock, Arkansas 72201
- Coordinates: 34°44′43″N 92°19′39″W
- Owner: City of Little Rock
- Operator: Arkansas Travelers Baseball, Inc.
- Capacity: 6,083
- Surface: Grass
- Field size: Left Field: 330 feet Center Field: 390 feet Right Field: 345 feet

Construction
- Groundbreaking: 1931
- Opened: April 13, 1932
- Closed: September 3, 2006
- Demolished: 2012
- Cost: $100,000 ($2.36 million in 2025 dollars)
- Architects: Thompson, Sanders & Ginocchio
- General contractors: McGregor & Pickett

Tenants
- Little Rock Travelers (SA) (1932–1961); Arkansas Travelers (TL) (1963–2006)

Ray Winder Field was a baseball park in Little Rock, Arkansas. The ballpark sat with home plate in roughly the north-northwest corner of the property. The former boundaries of the park were West 8th Street (later Interstate 630) (south, right field); Jonesboro Drive (west, right field corner); South Monroe Street (west, first base stands); buildings on driveway extended from Ray Winder Drive (north, third base stands); buildings bordering South Palm Street (east, left field). The field was in operation for around 74 years.

== History ==
=== Construction ===
The ballpark was constructed during 1931, as a new home field for the Little Rock Travelers, later to become the Arkansas Travelers, minor league baseball team. The Travelers vacated Kavanaugh Field, near Little Rock Central High School, and opened their 1932 season on April 13 at the newly completed ballpark, which was initially called Travelers Field for the team name.

=== Renaming ===
On August 26, 1966, Travelers Field was renamed Ray Winder Field, after Raymond Winder, who was involved with the business end of The Travelers for some sixty years. Winder started as a ticket seller in 1915, was named as the Arkansas Traveler business manager in 1931, and became part owner in 1944. The Traveler franchise was moved to Shreveport following the 1958 season, leaving Little Rock without a baseball club for the first time since 1914. Traveler Field sat empty during the 1959 season while efforts continued to return minor league baseball to Little Rock. After a public stock drive raised funds to purchase a bankrupt New Orleans franchise, the Travelers were resurrected in Little Rock for the 1960 season. Ray Winder was again asked to manage the day-to-day details of rebuilding the club.

=== Valentine era ===
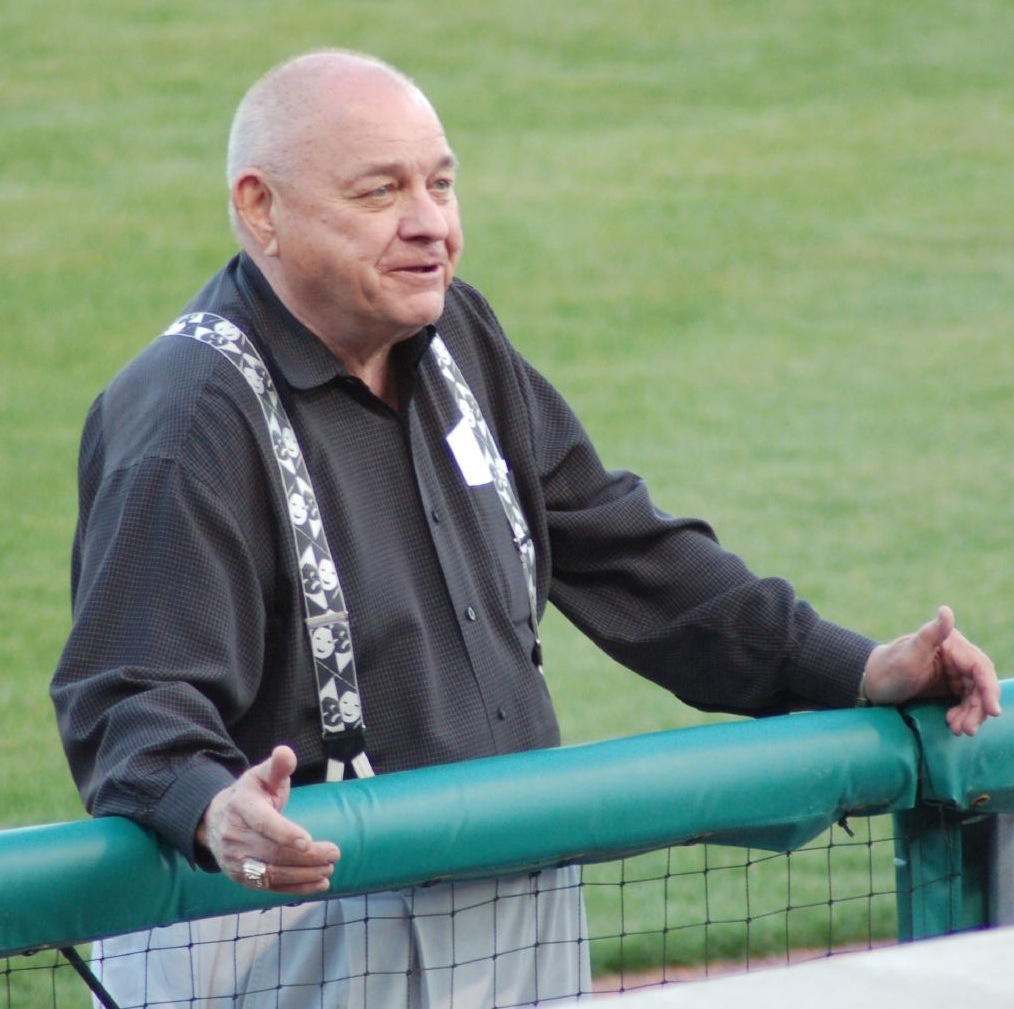
Valentine in 2007

In 1976, Bill Valentine, a former American League umpire, was chosen as general manager for the Travelers. Valentine was general manager until 2007, 31 years. He remained executive vice president for two more seasons, before retiring in March 2009.

Faced with an aging ballpark and limited funds, Valentine began to promote the historic nature of Ray Winder Field. Through his efforts the ballpark gained recognition as one of the oldest active parks in minor league baseball, and he encouraged fans to travel to Little Rock to experience the nostalgia and sample the baseball history represented by Ray Winder Field. He promoted the home of the Arkansas Travelers as "A great place to see old-time baseball, wholesome entertainment aimed squarely at the family market."

=== Closing ===
In 2005, construction began on a new ballpark in North Little Rock which would eventually become the home of the Arkansas Travelers. On September 3, 2006, the final game of the 2006 season, a capacity crowd filled Ray Winder Field as fans returned for the last Traveler game at Ray Winder Field. During this game, the Travelers beat the Springfield Cardinals by a score of 7-3. Beginning with the 2007 season, the Arkansas Travelers home ballpark is Dickey-Stephens Park in North Little Rock.

Commemorative ticket for the Arkansas Travelers final game in Ray Winder Field.

Ray Winder Field sat vacant for almost five years while forces outside of organized baseball determined the future of this historic ballpark. Many citizens recognized the ballpark as a historic structure both for the City of Little Rock and for baseball, and it was proposed that the park be restored as a functional baseball field for city and college teams as had been done with Rickwood Field in Birmingham, Alabama. Others proposed demolishing the historic ballpark in order to utilize the area as a parking lot for the nearby University of Arkansas for Medical Sciences. The Arkansas Zoological Foundation wanted the Little Rock Zoo to expand into Ray Winder by refitting the grandstand as a viewing area for an Asian elephant exhibit. During all of these discussions, the underlying atmosphere from the City of Little Rock was one of disinterest and apathy, with no apparent recognition of the park's historic ties to baseball's golden era, and no interest in assisting in the landmark ballpark's preservation.

Ultimately, the decision was made to sell the park to the University of Arkansas for Medical Sciences, with all structures to be razed and the land cleared for use as a parking lot. The City of Little Rock again confirmed that they had no interest preserving the park. Several sales were held to disperse remaining artifacts to baseball fans from across the country who had visited this ballpark, and on May 14, 2011, the park was opened for a final time when the remaining wooden seats, dating to 1932, were dismantled and given to fans on a first-come, first-served basis.
