= Sharon Fort =

American substance abuse counselor

- Born: Prescott, Arkansas
- Education: Texas A&M University
- Occupations: Substance abuse counselor Non-profit owner
- Organization: God's Helping Hand Ministries
- Known for: First African-American to join Arkansas Society of the Daughters of the American Revolution

Sharon Fort is an American substance abuse counselor and non-profit founder. In 2022, she became the first African-American woman to join the Arkansas Society of the Daughters of the American Revolution.

== Early life and education ==
Fort was born in Prescott, Arkansas. She was a student at Booker T. Washington High School and was in the last class to attend the school before it was closed by federal mandate to end racial segregation in the United States. She then transferred to Arkansas High School.

Ford later studied at Texarkana Business College. She earned an associate degree in applied sciences with an emphasis on drug and alcohol abuse counseling from Texarkana Community College in 2008. She later obtained a Bachelor of Science degree in psychology with a concentration in sociology from Texas A&M University. She earned a master's degree in interdisciplinary studies in psychology with concentrations in criminal justice and counseling from Texas A&M in 2012.

== Career ==
After finishing business school, Ford began working as an office administrator for the United States federal government in 1998.

In the 2000s, Ford founded God's Helping Hand Ministries, a non-profit organization that helps people with mental health issues living in Texarkana and in Ghana.

She is a licensed chemical dependency counselor in the state of Texas.

== Personal life ==
On September 1, 2022, Ford became the first African-American to join the Arkansas Society of the Daughters of the American Revolution. She descends from the son of an enslaved black woman and a white landowner who had furnished supplies in North Carolina during the American Revolutionary War.
