= Genoa Central School District =

School district in Texarkana Arkansas, United States

Location
- 12472 Hwy 196; Texarkana, Arkansas 71854 United States

District information
- Type: Comprehensive public
- Grades: K-12
- Accreditation: ADE
- Schools: 4
- NCES District ID: 0504110

Students and staff
- Students: 1213
- Teachers: 77.38 (on FTE basis)
- Staff: 152.38 (on FTE basis)
- Student–teacher ratio: 12.70
- Athletic conference: 3A Region 7, 4A Region 7 (Football) Arkansas Activities Association
- District mascot: Dragon
- Colors: Green; White

Other information
- Website: dragons1.k12.ar.us

Genoa Central School District is a school district based in Texarkana, Arkansas United States. The district encompasses 79.11 square miles (204.9 km^{2}) of land in Miller County and serves portions of Texarkana.

== Schools ==
Genoa Central School District serves an average of 1200 students each year. Genoa Central employs more than 150 faculty and staff for its four schools:

- Genoa Central High School, serving grades 10 through 12.
- Albert J. Murphy Junior High School, serving grades 7 through 9.
- Gary E. Cobb Middle School, serving grades 4 through 6.
- Genoa Central Ełementary School, serving kindergarten through grade 3.
