= Billy Bock =

Baseball coach, boxer

Biographical details
- Born: April 30, 1935; Kansas City, Missouri, U.S.
- Died: July 8, 2003 (aged 68); Pine Bluff, Arkansas, U.S.

Playing career
- 1954–1958: University of the Ozarks

Coaching career (HC unless noted)

Baseball
- 1973–1974: St. Anne's Academy; Texarkana (AR) HS; Sylvan Hills HS
- 1976–1981: Henderson State Univ.
- 1982–1999: Pine Bluff HS

Head coaching record
- Overall: 641–121 (.841)

Accomplishments and honors

Championships
- Arkansas State High School Baseball: St. Anne's Academy – 1967; Sylvan Hills High School – 1974; Arkansas High School – 1982; Pine Bluff High School – 1983–1986, 1992, 1995; NAIA Arkansas Intercollegiate Conference – 1979

Records
- 9 – Most state high school baseball titles (coach); 98–69 (.587) Henderson State; 457–97 (.825) Pine Bluff HS

Billy Bock (April 30, 1935 – July 8, 2003) was an American college and high school baseball coach, who led his high school teams to a nine state championships across four decades while never having a losing season.

Billy Bock of Pine Bluff died of cancer Tuesday, July 8, 2003, in Pine Bluff, Arkansas. He attended Holy Redeemer Elementary School and graduated from Subiaco Academy. He received his bachelor's degree from College of the Ozarks in Clarksville, Arkansas, and a master's degree in education from Northeastern State University in Tahlequah, Oklahoma.

== Playing career ==
Billy graduated from Subiaco Academy in 1954 as a four-year letterman in football, basketball, baseball, track and tennis and a five-year letterman in boxing. He won all-district and all-state honors and in his junior year, won the Coury Cup that recognizes the school's best all-around athlete.

As a player at the University of the Ozarks, Bock was a member of the All-AIC Team three seasons in baseball. He was All-AIC Honorable Mention in football. As a boxer, Bock was the State Golden Gloves boxing champion five times and four consecutive years, Mid-South Champion, AAU Champion, Louisiana–Arkansas National Guards Champion and was named "Outstanding Boxer" in the Regional National Golden Gloves Tournament in Tulsa, Oklahoma, and participated in the National AAU Tournament in Toledo, Ohio, and in the Chicago National Golden Gloves Tournament. He also sparred with Muhammad Ali when he was known as Cassius Clay.

== Coaching career ==
Bock made his mark on the football and baseball fields at Ozarks in the 1950s. But Bock's greatest achievements came after starring at Ozarks. Bock was among the most prominent and successful High School baseball coaches in the country for four decades. His teams captured nine state baseball titles during his career which includes a state record five championships in a row. He won state titles at Fort Smith St. Anne's Academy in 1967, Sylvan Hills in 1974, Texarkana in 1982 and Pine Bluff in 1983, 1984, 1985, 1986, 1992 and 1995. He coached in Arkansas for 44 years. During this time, he served as head coach in football, basketball, golf, tennis, boxing, and 35 years in baseball. Six years in baseball were as head coach at Henderson State University (1976–81), where he compiled a 98–69 record, four District 17 tournament appearances and won two Arkansas Intercollegiate Conference (AIC) championships. Bock led high school baseball for 29 years were at St. Anne's Academy in Fort Smith, Sylvan Hills High School (1973–74), Arkansas High School at Texarkana, and Pine Bluff High School. His teams finished as state runners-up five times and appeared in 27 state tournaments and won 23 district championships with an overall record of 641–121 (.841). He never had a losing season in any sport.

== Awards and recognition ==
He was named Arkansas High School Coaches Association (AHSCA) Baseball Coach of the Year nine times (1967, 1974, 1983–85, 1987, 1990, 1992, 1995) and District Coach of the Year 18 times. He was nationally recognized as well. Collegiate Baseball named him Coach of the Decade for the 1980s and then Co-Coach of the Century. Additionally, the American Baseball Coaches Association (ABCA) named him ABCA District VI Coach of the Year (three times), ABCA National Coach of the Year (two times), NAIA District 17 Baseball Coach of the Year, AIC Baseball Coach of the Year, National High School Gold Baseball Coaching Award, NFICA Outstanding Coach for Arkansas & Southwest Region (2003), USA Baseball Golden Diamond Award, US Baseball Coach of the Year for Arkansas, District Football Coach of the Year (three times), and District Basketball Coach of the Year (two times).

He was the 1986 head coach of the "Gold Medal" winning South Team in the USA Olympic Festival. He was honored twice by the Arkansas Legislature and twice had a "Billy Bock Day" in Arkansas proclaimed by then Governor Bill Clinton. He received the Distinguished Alumni Award at Subiaco Academy and also the University of the Ozarks.

He was inducted into the following halls of fame:

- Arkansas Sports Hall of Fame (1996)
- American Baseball Coaches Hall of Fame (2004)
- Arkansas High School Coaches Association Hall of Fame (2008)
- University of the Ozarks Hall of Fame (2009)
- Henderson State University Hall of Fame (2010)
