= Kavanaugh Field =

Minor league baseball park in Arkansas, U.S.

Coordinates: 34°44′12.84″N 92°18′6.24″W

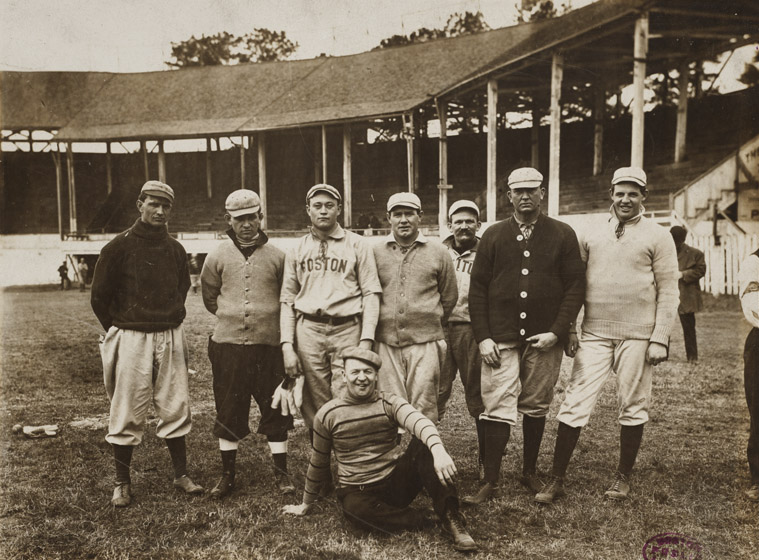
Members of the 1907 Boston Americans at West End Park for spring training, with Cy Young second from right

Kavanaugh Field was a minor league baseball park in Little Rock, Arkansas. It was the home of the Little Rock Travelers prior to their move to Travelers Field in 1932. The ballpark opened in 1901, as West End Park. In 1915 it was renamed for former team owner and Southern Association president William M. Kavanaugh, after he had died from a sudden illness in February 1915.

West End Park was the spring training site for the Boston Red Sox in 1907 (when they were known as the Boston Americans) and 1908.

As part of vacating the ballpark after 1931, the property was sold to nearby Little Rock Central High School. The field was converted to football specifications and was renamed Quigley Stadium. The field is west of the school (the eastern boundary of which is Park Street) and the school's baseball field. The other boundaries are West Daisy L. Gatson Bates Drive (formerly West 14th Street - north), West 16th Street (south) and Jones Street (west).
