= John Adams (offensive lineman) =

American football player (1921–1969)

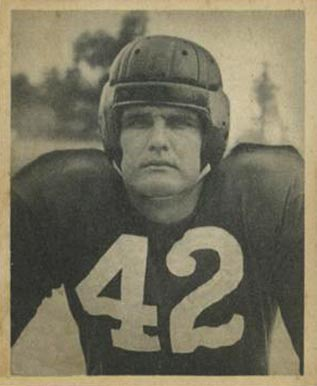
- Adams on a 1948 Bowman football card

No. 42
- Position: Offensive tackle

Personal information
- Born: September 22, 1921; Charleston, Arkansas, U.S.
- Died: August 20, 1969 (aged 47); Bethesda, Maryland, U.S.
- Listed height: 6 ft 7 in (2.01 m)
- Listed weight: 242 lb (110 kg)

Career information
- High school: Subiaco (AR)
- College: Notre Dame
- NFL draft: 1945: 3rd round, 23rd overall pick

Career history
- Washington Redskins (1945–1949)

Awards and highlights
- National champion (1943)

Career NFL statistics
- Games played: 55
- Games started: 26
- Fumble recoveries: 5
- Stats at Pro Football Reference

John William "Tree" Adams (September 22, 1921 – August 20, 1969) was an American professional football offensive lineman in the National Football League (NFL) for the Washington Redskins from 1945 to 1949. He played college football at the University of Notre Dame.

== Early life ==
Adams was born in Charleston, Arkansas as one of ten children. He was considered normal size until he was 10, but then experienced a growth spurt during which he "shot up like a tree". He attended Subiaco Academy in Subiaco, Arkansas, where he played high school football and basketball.

== College career ==
Adams played college football at the University of Notre Dame from 1942 to 1944. In 1943, he was the backup for Ziggy Czarobski on the 1943 championship team and then became the starting tackle in 1944.

== Professional career ==
Adams was selected in the third round of the 1945 NFL draft by the Washington Redskins.
