= Tommy Brasher =

American football coach (1940–2025)

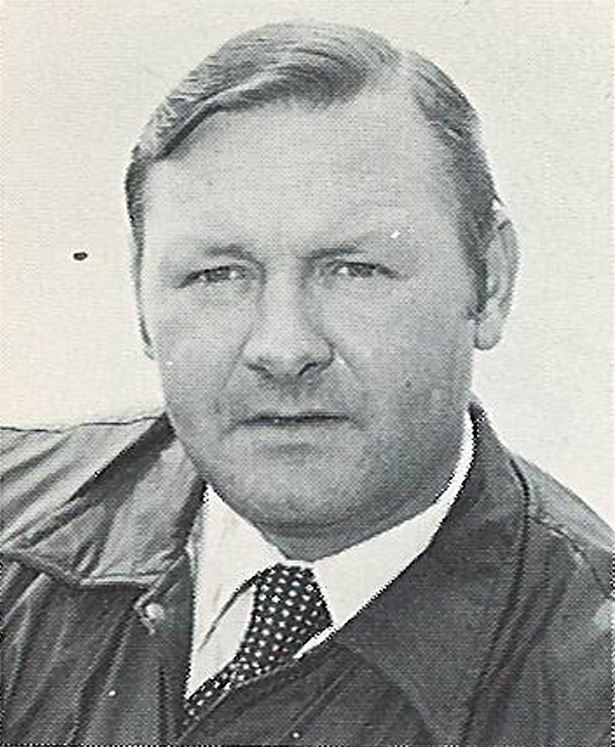
- Brasher, c. 1972

Personal information
- Born: December 30, 1940; El Dorado, Arkansas, U.S.
- Died: January 20, 2025 (aged 84); Mercer Island, Washington, U.S.

Career information
- High school: El Dorado (AR)
- College: Arkansas (1961–1963)

Career history
- El Dorado (AR) (1965) Assistant; Ball High School (TX) (1966) Defensive assistant; Hot Springs High School (AR) (1967–1969) Head coach; Arkansas (1970) Defensive assistant; Virginia Tech (1971–1973) Defensive line/linebackers coach; Northeast Louisiana (1974) Assistant; Shreveport Steamer (1975) Defensive coordinator; Northeast Louisiana (1976) Assistant; SMU (1977–1981) Defensive line coach; New England Patriots (1982–1984) Defensive line coach; Philadelphia Eagles (1985) Defensive line coach; Atlanta Falcons (1986–1989) Defensive line coach; Tampa Bay Buccaneers (1990) Defensive line coach; Seattle Seahawks (1992–1997) Defensive line coach; Seattle Seahawks (1998) Linebackers coach; Philadelphia Eagles (1999–2005) Defensive line coach; Philadelphia Eagles (2012) Defensive line coach; Kansas City Chiefs (2013–2015) Defensive line coach; Kansas City Chiefs (2016–2017) Special projects

Awards and highlights
- Super Bowl champion (LIV); Ed Block Courage Award; University of Arkansas Sports Hall of Honor; Union County (AR) Sports Hall of Fame; Arkansas Sports Hall of Fame

Tommy Milton Brasher (December 30, 1940 – January 20, 2025) was an American football coach. He coached in the National Football League (NFL) for 29 seasons, primarily as a defensive line coach.

== Early life and playing career ==
Brasher was a two-time All-State fullback at El Dorado High School and scored 99 points his senior season. Childhood friend Herbert Ray Martin said Brasher was the leader of the El Dorado teams in the late 1950s. “He was like coach on the field,” Martin said. “He always wanted to be a coach. If you got out of line, he was going to straighten you out.” He also excelled in high school as a basketball player and shot putter for the track and field team.

He switched to center and linebacker at the University of Arkansas, playing for College Football Hall of Fame head coach Frank Broyles. He was also a teammate of future Pro Football Hall of Famers Dallas Cowboys owner Jerry Jones and two time Super Bowl winning Cowboys and Miami Dolphins head coach Jimmy Johnson. The Razorbacks split the Southwest Conference (SWC) championship with Texas in Brasher's sophomore season of 1961 when he recorded a career-high 68 tackles and he led Arkansas with 5 pass breakups in the first year that statistic was tracked. Brasher recorded 38 tackles as a junior in 1962 when Arkansas finished second in the SWC. Brasher lettered three times, his Arkansas teams had a combined record of 22–10, and played in back-to-back Sugar Bowls in 1962 and 1963. In August 1963, Brasher injured his knee and was a non-factor on his senior team that finished 5-5.

== Coaching career ==
=== Hot Springs High School ===
Brasher was head coach at Hot Springs High School from 1967 to 1969, he inherited a program that was on a losing streak. “We were in a district that I thought (Hot Springs) should have done better,” he said. “Why weren’t they winning? I got there and one night after a loss I talked to the kids. I found out the problem: They didn’t care. That was their tradition. “So I ran off 53 players. When the group that was left got to be seniors, they finished the season with six straight shutouts. They allowed 20 points in 20 games. They cared.” This laid the foundation for the 1970 team that won a state championship while going undefeated.

=== Arkansas Razorbacks ===
Brasher spent most of his career as a defensive line coach, a course set in motion by Broyles when he hired Brasher as an assistant coach at Arkansas. One afternoon in 1970, Brasher recalled this scenario: “Coach Broyles called me up 50 rows. First day of spring, ‘Brasher! Brasher! Come up here.’ ‘You need to learn the line,’ so I learned the line.” Later, “he called me over one day and said, ‘I know you’ve been coaching linebackers, but I can’t ever find a defensive line coach,’” Brasher told the Arkansas Democrat-Gazette when he was elected to the Arkansas Sports Hall of Fame in 2022. “‘I want you to be that.’” He followed Charlie Coffey to Virginia Tech from 1971-73 after Coffey, the Arkansas defensive coordinator, was hired as the Hokies’ head coach.

=== New England Patriots ===
After 16 seasons coaching in the high school and collegiate ranks and 1 professional season with the World Football League's Shreveport Steamer as defensive coordinator, Brasher followed former SMU Mustangs head coach Ron Meyer to the NFL's New England Patriots, where Meyer was hired as head coach. Brasher coached the Patriots defensive line for three seasons.

=== Seattle Seahawks ===
Brasher coached the Seattle Seahawks defensive line from 1992 to 1997 and linebackers in 1998. His most exemplary player was Wilson, Arkansas native DT Cortez Kennedy, who was named First-team All-Pro three times, Second-team All-Pro, 1992 NFL Defensive Player of the Year on a 2-14 team, and earned five of his eight Pro Bowl selections under Brasher's tutelage. Kennedy became only the second player who played the majority of their career with the Seahawks enshrined in the Pro Football Hall of Fame in 2012.

=== Philadelphia Eagles ===
Brasher had three separate stints as defensive line coach with the Philadelphia Eagles. His first was in 1985 under head coach Marion Campbell, coaching future Pro Football Hall of Famer Reggie White in his rookie season. White and DE Greg Brown each totaled 13 sacks on the season.

He returned to the Eagles in 1999 under head coach Andy Reid. Throughout most of 2001, Brasher battled a cancerous tumor in his parotid gland (one of the salivary glands) and on October 16, he underwent a six-hour surgery to have it removed. He missed only five days of work. Three weeks later, Brasher underwent another procedure, which removed 67 lymph nodes from his neck and shoulder. He again missed just five days of work and no games. His battle with cancer earned him the 2001 Eagles' Ed Block Courage Award. Despite the award being given annually to one player from each NFL team, Brasher became just the third special non-player recipient of the prestigious honor. It is presented to players and coaches in the NFL who are voted on by their teammates as role models of inspiration, sportsmanship and courage. During his second tenure, the Eagles appeared in the NFC Championship Game four consecutive seasons (2001–2004) and in Super Bowl XXXIX. In the 2004 NFC Championship season, the defensive linemen had 32 of the Eagles 47 sacks (second in the NFL).

Two of his players, DT Corey Simon (2003) and DE Hugh Douglas (2000–2002) were selected to the Pro Bowl. Douglas was also a First-team All-Pro in 2000, Second-team All-Pro in 2002, and retired after the 2004 season third all-time on the Eagles sack list with 54.5 sacks, behind Clyde Simmons and Reggie White. Douglas was enshrined in the Philadelphia Eagles Hall of Fame in 2022. After the 2005 season, DE Trent Cole was named to the PFWA NFL All-Rookie Team. Brasher retired following the 2005 season. He came out of retirement in 2012 to rejoin the Eagles after the firing of Jim Washburn to finish the season.

=== Kansas City Chiefs ===
After head coach Andy Reid left the Eagles and was hired by the Kansas City Chiefs, Brasher was among the assistant coaches who followed Reid to Kansas City. DT Dontari Poe made the Pro Bowl twice (2013–14) and was named Second-team All-Pro in 2013. "He really treats us like grown men, which makes us show him the same respect back, on getting our craft better," Poe said. "He's not the type to holler at you but if he needs you to do something, he'll let you know what you're going to have to do." In Brasher's final season as an assistant coach in 2015, he was the oldest in the league at age 75. In all, Brasher spent 13 seasons on staff for Andy Reid in Philadelphia and Kansas City. After the Chiefs defeated the San Francisco 49ers in Super Bowl LIV, he was awarded a Super Bowl ring for his work as a team consultant.

== Career honors ==
In addition to the Ed Block Courage Award, Brasher was inducted into the University of Arkansas Sports Hall of Honor in 2008, the Union County Sports Hall of Fame in 2013, and the Arkansas Sports Hall of Fame in 2022.

== Death ==
Brasher died at his home on January 20, 2025, in Mercer Island, Washington, surrounded by family. He was survived by his wife of 62 years, LaNelle, as well as daughters Melodie and Christy, four grandchildren and two brothers.
