= Dickey–Stephens Park =

Baseball park in North Little Rock, Arkansas

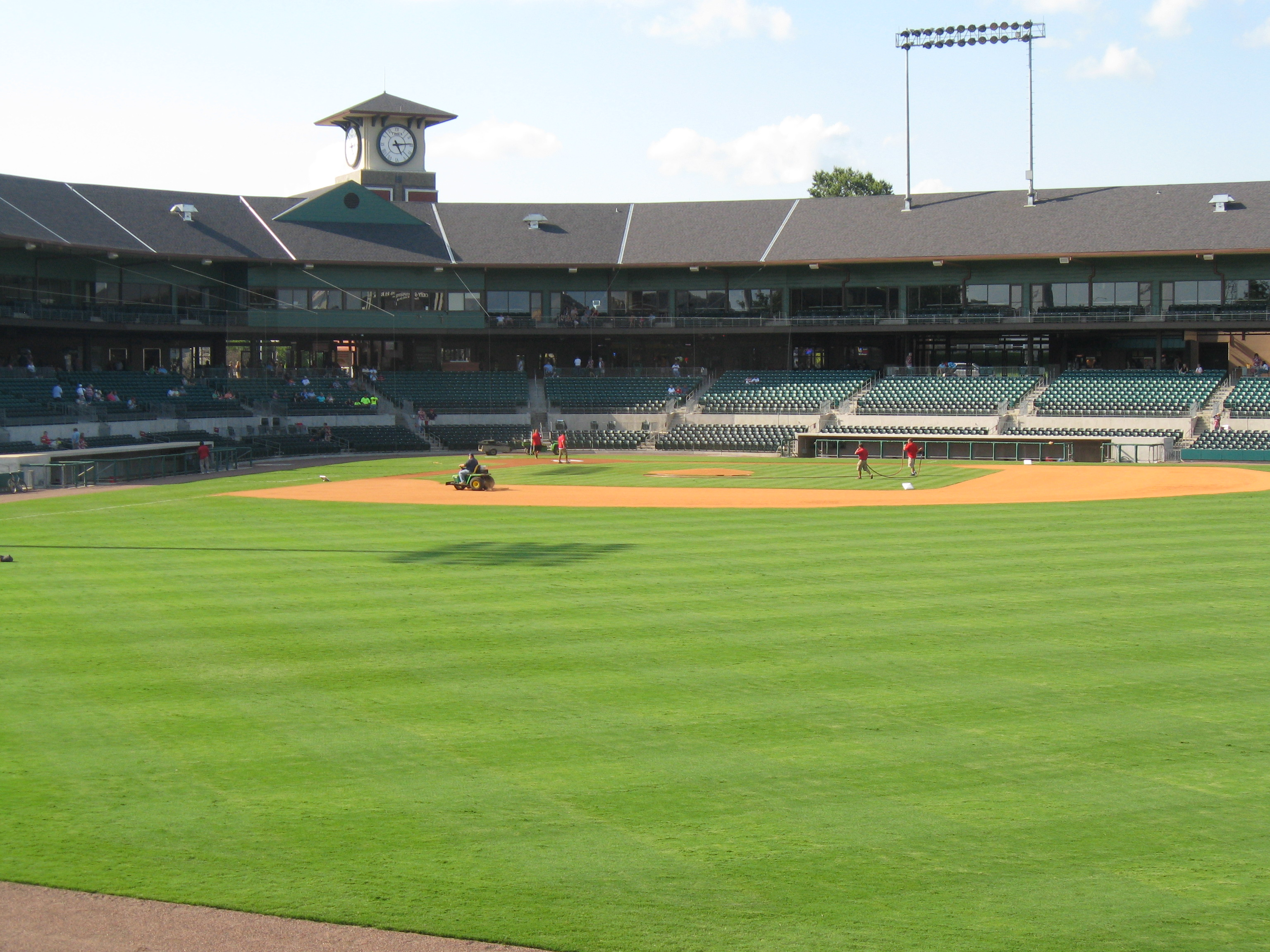

- Location within Arkansas Location within the United States
- Location: 400 West Broadway Street; North Little Rock, AR 72114
- Coordinates: 34°45′19″N 92°16′21″W
- Owner: City of North Little Rock
- Operator: Arkansas Travelers Baseball, Inc.
- Capacity: Baseball: 7,300 (5,800 fixed seats)
- Field size: Left field – 332 feet (101 m); Left Center – 360 feet (110 m); Center Field – 400 feet (120 m); Right Center – 375 feet (114 m); Right field – 330 feet (100 m)

Construction
- Groundbreaking: November 30, 2005
- Opened: April 12, 2007
- Cost: $40.4 million ($62.7 million in 2025 dollars)
- Architects: HKS, Inc. Taggart Foster Currence Gary Architects, Inc. Witsell Evans Rasco
- Structural engineers: Jaster-Quintanilla & Associates
- Services engineer: Smith Seckman Reid Inc.
- General contractor: Hensel Phelps/East-Harding

Tenant
- Arkansas Travelers (Texas League) (2007–present)

Dickey–Stephens Park is a baseball park in North Little Rock, Arkansas, United States. The ballpark is primarily used for baseball and serves as the home for the Arkansas Travelers of the Texas League. The capacity of the ballpark is 7,300, which includes 5,800 fixed seats and 1,500 on the berms. It opened in 2007 as a replacement for Ray Winder Field in Little Rock, Arkansas. The ballpark is named after two pairs of local Arkansas brothers: Baseball Hall of Famer Bill Dickey, former Major League Baseball catcher George Dickey, and businessmen Jackson T. Stephens and W. R. Stephens.

== History ==
The majority of the ballpark's cost—about 83%—was paid by the public. On August 9, 2005, 54.3% of voters in North Little Rock approved a temporary (two-year) 1% sales tax increase that eventually generated $28 million in funding. Another $5.6 million was to be raised from ballpark revenue. On the private side of the ledger, Warren Stephens made a financial contribution of $440,494 and a land donation valued at $6.3 million. The North Little Rock City Beautiful Commission additionally donated $15,000.

The ballpark was designed by HKS, Inc. of Dallas, Texas while the general contractor was a joint venture of Hensel Phelps Construction of Austin, Texas and East-Harding Construction of Little Rock, Arkansas. A groundbreaking ceremony was held on November 30, 2005 with the actual construction beginning on January 26, 2006. The construction was completed on March 27, 2007, spanning over a period of 426 days.

The ballpark opened on April 12, 2007, where the Frisco RoughRiders beat the Travelers 6–5 with 7,943 fans in attendance. The ballpark was also the location where Tulsa Drillers batting coach Mike Coolbaugh was killed during a game against the Travelers. During the July 22, 2007 game, Coolbaugh was struck in the neck by a hard struck line drive as he was standing in the first base coaches box, and died an hour later from the impact of the injury that resulted in a severe brain hemorrhage. The result of Coolbaugh's death led to the decision by Major League Baseball (MLB) general managers to require base coaches to wear helmets on the field during games, starting with the 2008 MLB season.

== Gallery ==
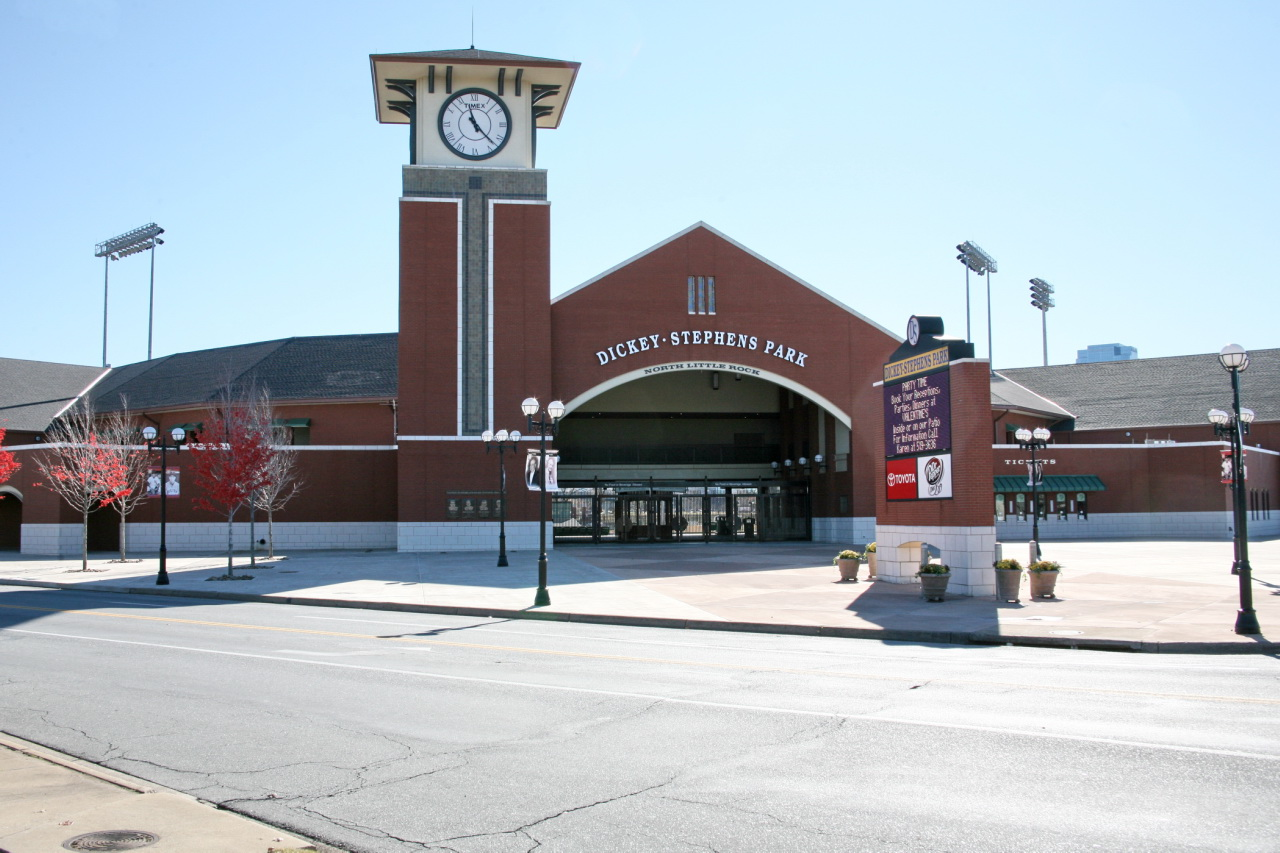
Entrance to the ballpark in December 2008

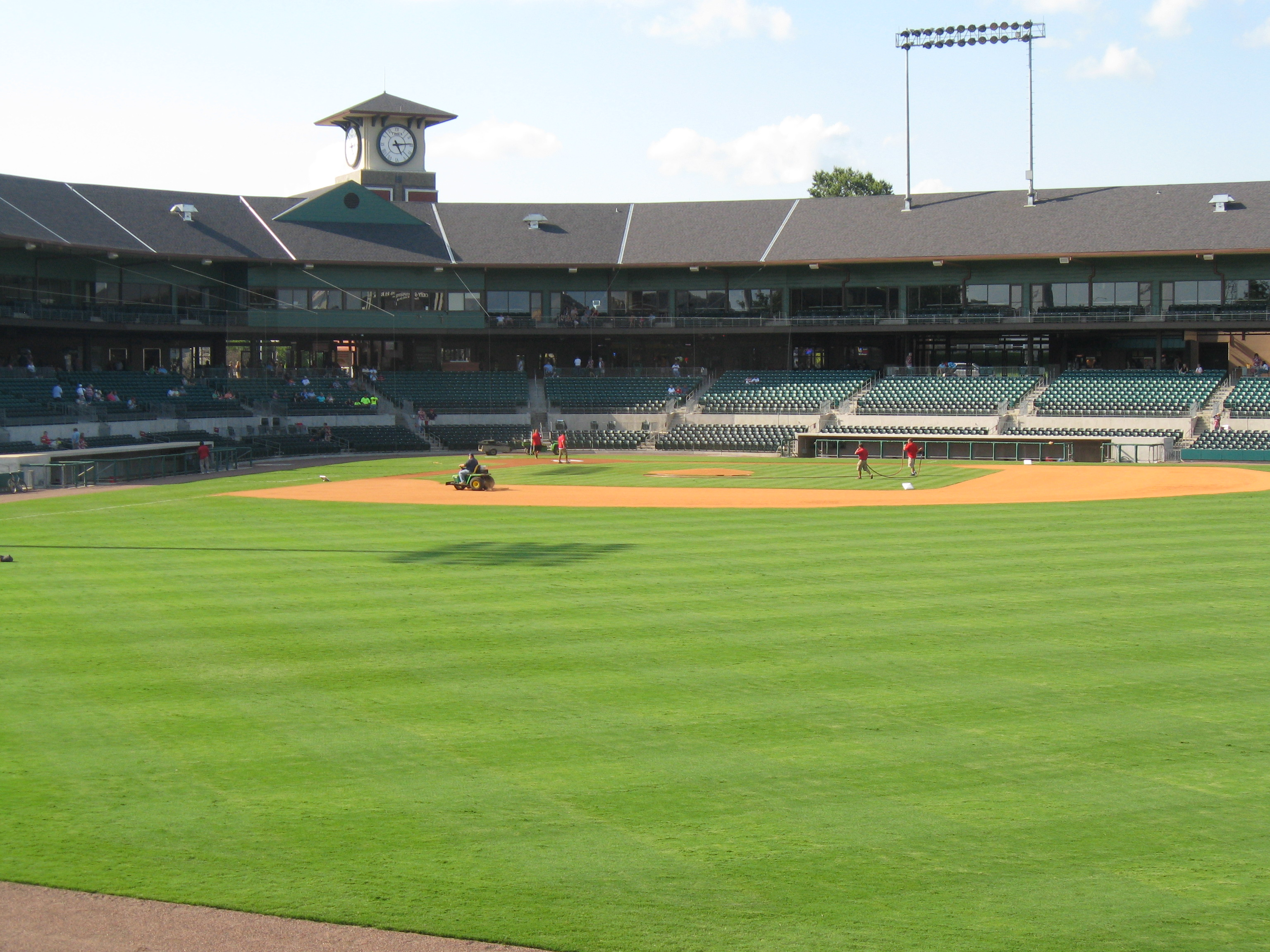
Field and grandstand from center field in July 2009

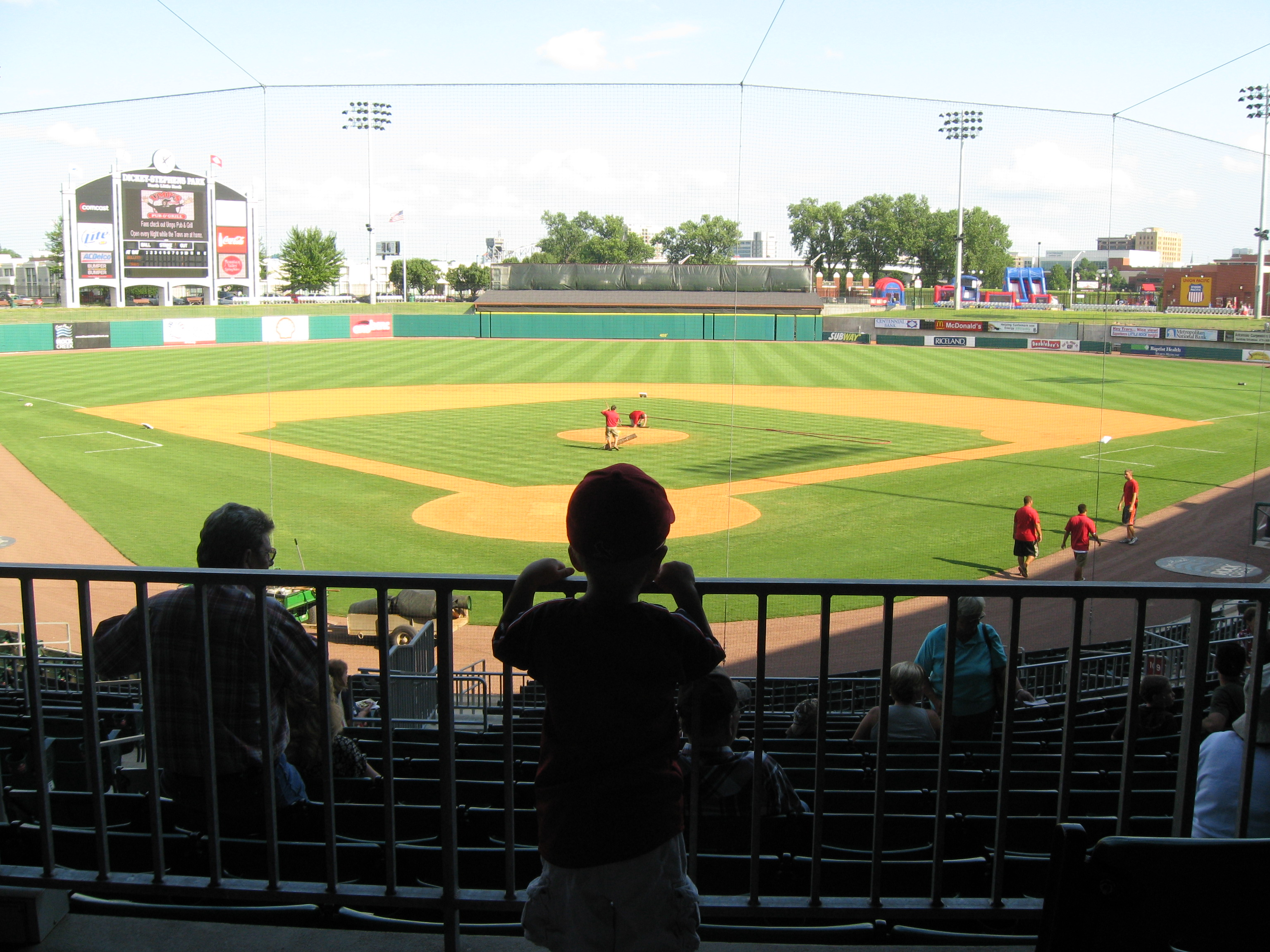
Field from grandstand behind home plate in July 2009
