= Mike Cherry (American football) =

American football player (born 1973)

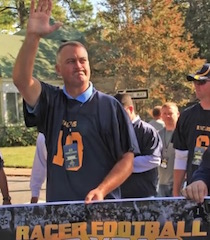
- Cherry waving during the 2015 Murray State Football Homecoming Parade

No. 18
- Position: Quarterback

Personal information
- Born: December 15, 1973 (age 52); Texarkana, Arkansas, U.S.
- Listed height: 6 ft 4 in (1.93 m)
- Listed weight: 226 lb (103 kg)

Career information
- High school: Arkansas (Texarkana)
- College: Arkansas; Murray State
- NFL draft: 1997: 6th round, 171st overall pick

Career history
- New York Giants (1997–2000); → Rhein Fire (1999)
- Stats at Pro Football Reference

Mike Cherry (born December 15, 1973) is an American former professional football quarterback. He was selected by the New York Giants in the sixth round of the 1997 NFL draft. He played college football at Murray State University.

== Early life ==
Cherry attended Arkansas High School in Texarkana, Arkansas, where he was an honor student and excelled in football, basketball and track.

== College career ==
Cherry enrolled at the University of Arkansas, where he was a backup quarterback for the Arkansas Razorbacks football team from 1993 to 1994. He later transferred to the Murray State University, reuniting him with former Arkansas Razorback assistant Houston Nutt, who was the head coach of the Murray State Racers at the time. Cherry was the Racers starting quarterback from 1995 to 1996. He led the Racers to two Ohio Valley Conference Championships. While at Murray State, Cherry threw for 4,490 passing yards, completing 365 of his 640 passing attempts for 36 touchdowns.

== Professional career ==
Cherry was selected by the New York Giants in 1997, serving as the team's third-string quarterback from 1997 to 2000. During the 1998 season, he saw limited regular season action, throwing one incomplete pass. In 2001, Cherry was a member of the NFC champion New York Giants.
