= Subiaco Academy =

Location
- 405 North Subiaco Avenue; Subiaco, Logan County, Arkansas 72865; United States; 35°18′4″N 93°38′0″W

Information
- Type: Private, All-Male
- Religious affiliation: Roman Catholic
- Patron saint: St. Benedict
- Established: February 1887 (139 years ago)
- Status: Open
- CEEB code: 042375
- NCES School ID: 00047708
- Headmaster: David W. Wright
- Chaplain: Deacon Roy Goetz
- Teaching staff: 21.0 (on FTE basis)
- Grades: 7–12
- Gender: Male
- Enrollment: 150 (15 states, 9 countries)
- Student to teacher ratio: 8.2
- Campus size: 100 Acres
- Campus type: Open College Campus
- Colors: Blue and orange
- Slogan: Onward Trojans!
- Athletics: Football, Basketball, Soccer, Baseball, Tennis, Cross Country, Golf and Track
- Athletics conference: 4A
- Sports: Football, golf, cross country, basketball, soccer, tennis, baseball, track and field
- Mascot: Trojan
- Nickname: Subi
- Team name: Subiaco Trojans
- Accreditation: Arkansas Nonpublic School Accrediting Association
- Newspaper: Periscope
- Yearbook: Pax
- Affiliation: Subiaco Abbey
- Website: www.subiacoacademy.us

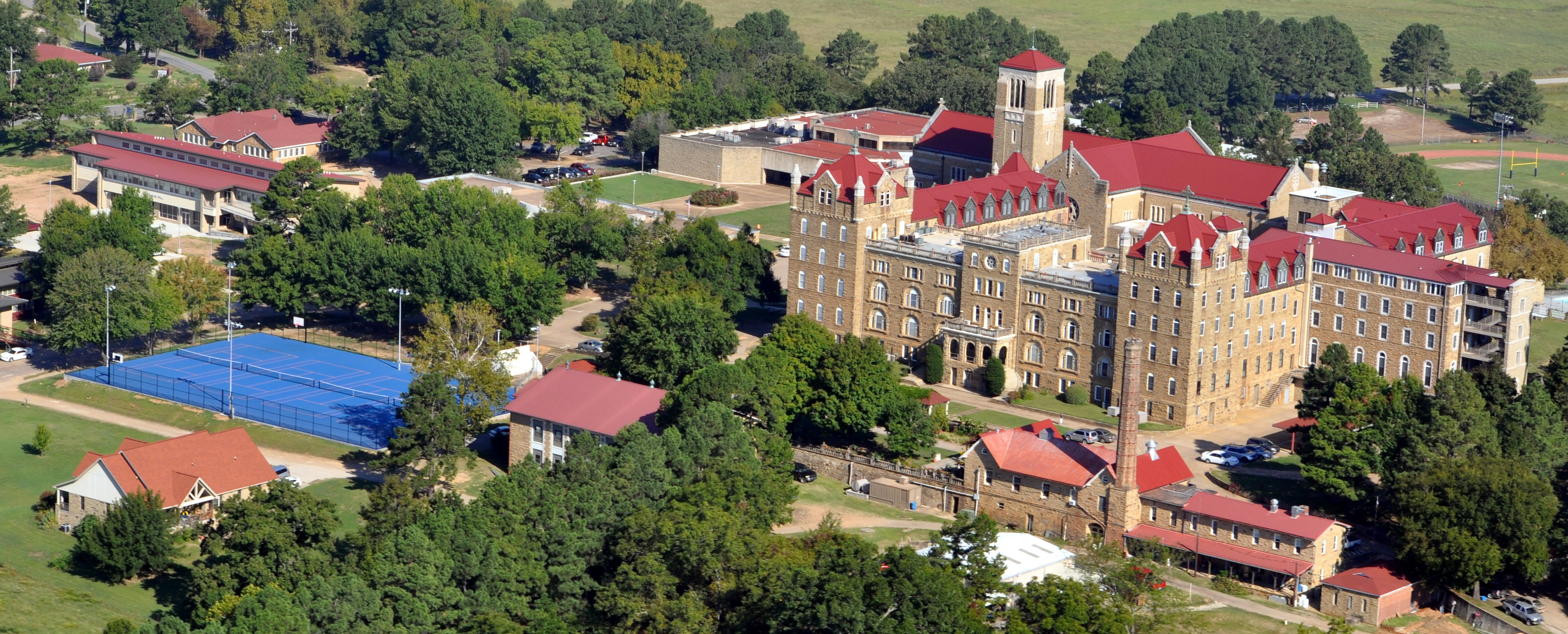
Bird's eye view of the School

Subiaco Academy is an American Roman Catholic day and boarding school for boys founded in 1887. Serving grades 7-12, it is part of Subiaco Abbey, a Benedictine monastery in Subiaco, Arkansas.

Earlier schools at the priory and abbey dated to 1887. The Benedictines have had a strong teaching tradition in its order. In 2024, Architectural Digest named the school one of the "World's 9 Most Beautiful Boarding Schools."

== History ==
The school was developed to serve German immigrants and their descendants in the Arkansas River Valley, who increased markedly in number from the 1870s, and especially in the 1880s and 1890s. The Little Rock-Fort Smith Railroad Company owned thousands of acres of land in the area. They had resolved to sell this land only to German Catholic settlers if possible.

This company approached the Swiss Benedictine monks in Indiana to send missionaries to Logan County Arkansas in 1878. These monks brought with them their Swiss Benedictine heritage of a monastery school. Until the First World War, numerous additional monks and recruits from Switzerland strengthened this educational tradition.

In 1887 the monks opened a school called St. Benedict's College to educate young men between the ages of 14 and 20 in the basic humanities. There were never more than 20 students in this school, and it was terminated in the summer of 1892. The monks reorganized this educational project that summer.

In the fall, the school was reopened as a seminary to train students for the Catholic ministry. This school was called The Scholasticate. Modeled upon European "Gymnasium" lines, the curriculum stressed classical languages and musical training. This form of the school reached its peak with some 70 students in 1901, but that year, the institution was largely destroyed by fire.

It was rebuilt, but in December 1927, the institution was again destroyed by fire. The monks opened a primitive school, Subiaco Academy, in February 1887, in what was left of the Main Building. This school barely survived the Depression years.

The earliest administrators and teachers were all Benedictine monks. By the time of the First World War, one or two of the teachers were lay males. Hired coaches were added after the mid-1920s. It was not until the mid-1970s that the school hired a majority lay staff (teachers and administrators), including female faculty members. Subiaco Academy was the first high school in the state of Arkansas to racially integrate.

== Academic programs ==
As a private college preparatory school, Subiaco Academy offers a wide range of programs and courses. Upon acceptance, each student must choose one of two tracks: The College Prep Track or College Prep Honors Track. Classes are related to broad programs, such as an Outdoor Education program, and Community "Well-being" Initiative.

=== Parallel curriculum ===
Each student partakes in the bi-weekly "Parallel Curriculum," a program developed by the Headmaster, Dr. David Wright. A first of its kind program, each grade is divided into groups where they learn everything from Academic and Life skills to Entrepreneurship, Integrity Based Leadership, and Emotional Intelligence.

== Notable alumni ==
- John Adams, professional football player for the Washington Redskins
- Billy Bock (1954),
- Frank Stanford (1966), poet
- Harvey Wheeler (1937), author, political scientist, and scholar
