= Arkansas Travelers =

- Founded in 1963; North Little Rock, Arkansas
Team logo
Cap insignia

Minor league affiliations
- Class: Double-A (1966–present)
- Previous classes: Triple-A (1963–1965)
- League: Texas League (1966–present)
- Division: North Division
- Previous leagues: Pacific Coast League (1964–1965); International League (1963)

Major league affiliations
- Team: Seattle Mariners (2017–present)
- Previous teams: Los Angeles Angels (2001–2016); St. Louis Cardinals (1966–2000); Philadelphia Phillies (1963–1965)

Minor league titles
- League titles (9): 1966; 1971; 1977; 1979; 1980; 1989; 2001; 2008; 2024
- Division titles (14): 1964; 1968; 1971; 1977; 1979; 1980; 1989; 2001; 2005; 2008; 2011; 2013; 2023; 2024
- First-half titles (12): 1978; 1979; 1980; 1985; 1989; 1998; 2001; 2008; 2011; 2018; 2019; 2023
- Second-half titles (7): 1977; 1983; 2005; 2013; 2014; 2015; 2024

Team data
- Name: Arkansas Travelers (1963–present)
- Colors: Red, black, gray, white, maroon
- Mascots: Ace and Otey
- Ballpark: Dickey–Stephens Park (2007–present)
- Previous parks: Ray Winder Field (1963–2006)
- Owner/ Operator: Diamond Baseball Holdings
- General manager: Sophie Ozier
- Manager: Rich Thompson
- Website: milb.com/arkansas

The Arkansas Travelers, known informally as The Travs, are a Minor League Baseball team based in North Little Rock, Arkansas. The Travelers are the Double-A affiliate of the Seattle Mariners and play in the Texas League.

== History ==
Professional baseball teams in Little Rock have used the Travelers nickname since 1901. The name is derived from the nineteenth-century folk song and story "The Arkansas Traveler". Originally known as the Little Rock Travelers, the first club adopted the Arkansas Travelers name in 1957 in an effort to draw support from throughout the state. In doing so, the Travelers became the first professional sports team in the United States to use the name of a state rather than a city as its geographic identifier. The Travelers nickname is among the oldest still in use in Minor League Baseball.

The Travelers competed in the Southern Association through 1961, when the league folded. Little Rock did not field a professional team in 1962.

=== Affiliations ===
The current incarnation of the Travelers franchise has existed continuously since 1963, when minor league baseball returned to Little Rock as the Philadelphia Phillies' Triple-A affiliate. The club had been slated to join the American Association, but that league folded before the 1963 season, and Arkansas instead played that year in the International League. The Travelers moved to the Pacific Coast League for the 1964 and 1965 seasons.

In 1966, Arkansas moved to the Texas League and dropped to the Double-A classification as an affiliate of the St. Louis Cardinals. The Cardinals affiliation lasted 35 seasons, through 2000, and was the second-longest active affiliation in Minor League Baseball when it ended. During the partnership, Arkansas won Texas League championships in 1971, 1977, 1979, 1980, and 1989. In 1971, the Texas League and Southern League operated an interlocking schedule as the Dixie Association; Arkansas won the Texas League championship before losing to the Charlotte Hornets in the Dixie Association championship series.

The Travelers became the Double-A affiliate of the Anaheim Angels in 2001 and remained in the Angels organization through 2016. Arkansas won Texas League championships in 2001 and 2008 during the affiliation. The 2001 title was awarded after the league championship series was halted following the September 11 attacks with Arkansas leading the Round Rock Express two games to none.

Arkansas became the Double-A affiliate of the Seattle Mariners in 2017. The affiliation continued following Major League Baseball's restructuring of the minor leagues in 2021, when the Travelers were placed in the newly created Double-A Central. In 2022, the Double-A Central resumed the historic Texas League name.

In 2024, the Travelers won their first Texas League championship since 2008, defeating the Midland RockHounds in the best-of-three championship series. Arkansas won the deciding game, 5–4, at Dickey–Stephens Park on a ninth-inning walk-off single by Alberto Rodriguez.

== Ballparks ==
=== Ray Winder Field ===
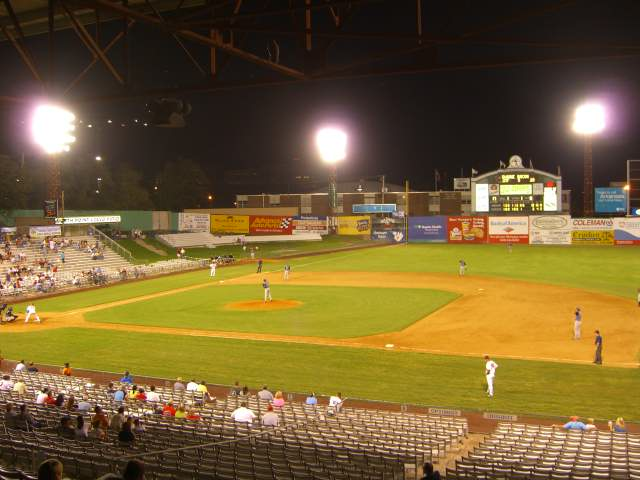
Ray Winder Field

From 1932 to 2006, the Travelers played at Ray Winder Field. Bill Valentine, a former American League umpire and team general manager from 1976 to 2007, began to promote the historic nature of Ray Winder Field. The ballpark gained recognition as one of the oldest still-active parks in the minors, and fans traveled to Little Rock to experience the nostalgia and baseball history. In 1991, the field saw the then-largest crowd to watch a baseball game in Arkansas history as Ray Winder played host to about 12,000 people who had come to see Fernando Valenzuela's rehabilitation start with the Midland Angels; that attendance record has since been surpassed by the Arkansas Razorbacks. However, after nearly 75 years, the field was starting to show signs of age. After a successful special election in 2005, the team moved to a newly-constructed stadium, Dickey-Stephens Park, at the start of the 2007 season, with Ray Winder field being demolished in 2012.

=== Dickey–Stephens Park ===
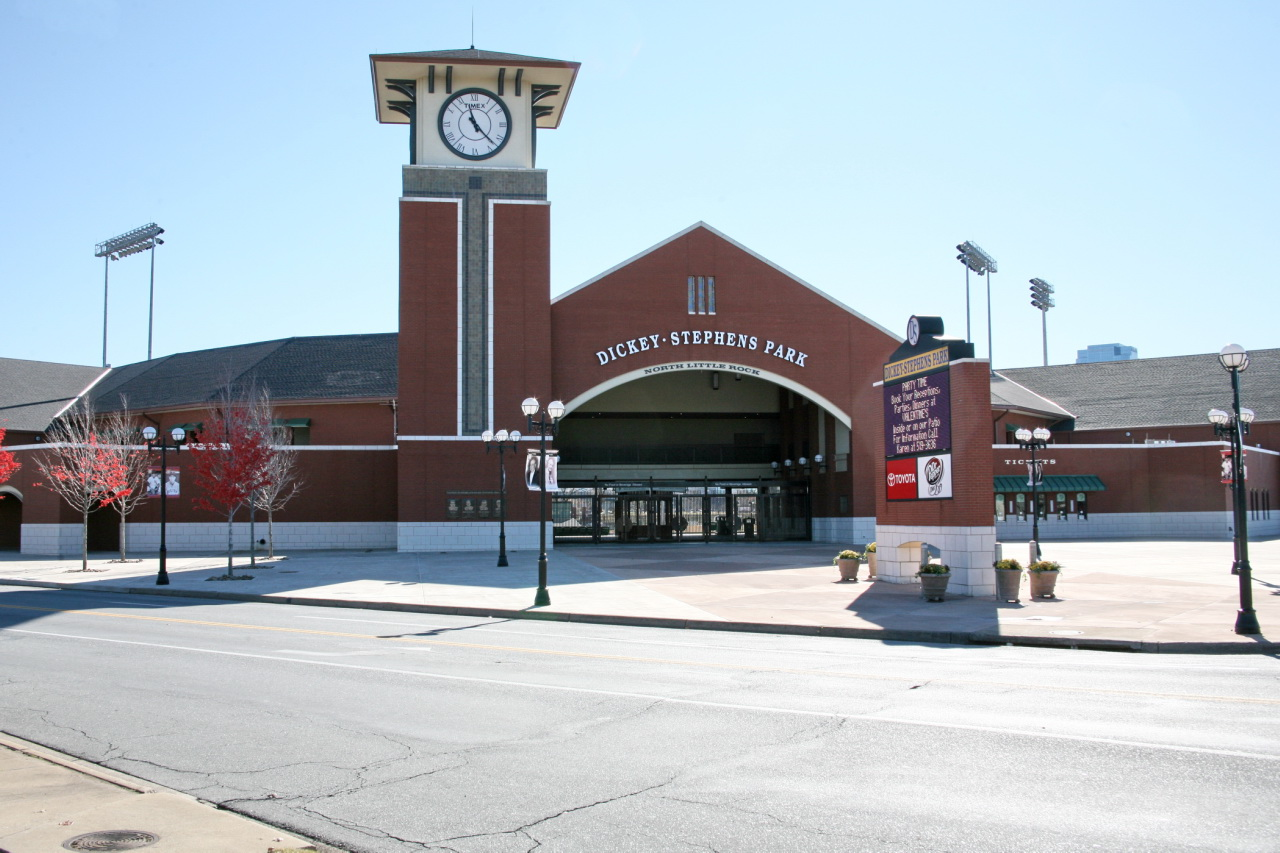
Dickey–Stephens Park

Dickey–Stephens Park in North Little Rock hosted its first Travelers game against the Frisco RoughRiders on April 12, 2007. It is primarily used for baseball and is the Travelers' home field. It holds at least 7,000 people. It was built through a partnership between the Travs, Little Rock businessman Warren Stephens, and the city of North Little Rock. After donating an 11-acre (45,000 m^{2}) plot of land east of the Broadway Bridge, Mr. Stephens named the ballpark in honor of two pairs of baseball-loving brothers; Stephens Inc. Founders Jack and Witt Stephens, and Hall of Fame catcher Bill Dickey and his brother Skeeter, also a former Major League ballplayer. Both Dickey brothers worked for Stephens Inc. following their baseball careers. Bill, who caught for the 1925 Little Rock Travelers, also managed the club for one season following a 17-year Hall of Fame career with the New York Yankees that included seven World Series titles.

== Uniforms ==
In 2004, the team introduced new road jerseys and alternate caps that paid homage to the Travs' home city. The jerseys had "Little Rock" written across the chest. Travelers’ jerseys have either featured "Arkansas" or "Travelers" ever since the 1950s.

Nostalgia is in these days and the retro look has become stylish, We were the Little Rock Travelers for years and after all this time we thought we lost the identification with Little Rock. Some people actually didn’t know we’re from Little Rock. The LR logo has had success on our replica caps and we thought that the time to make this change was right now."

— Bill Valentine

== Roster ==
Arkansas Travelers roster
Players	Coaches/Other
Pitchers: 37 Will Armbruester; 14 Ferny Barreda; 13 Tyler Cleveland; 41 Ty Cummings; 22 Ryan Hawks; 38 Michael Hobbs; 39 Lucas Kelly; 30 Jimmy Kingsbury; 18 Conor Larkin; 44 Adam Leverett; 17 Lael Lockhart; 28 Teddy McGraw; 14 Michael Morales; 21 Marcelo Perez; 43 Jason Ruffcorn; 26 Ryan Sloan; 19 Adam Smith; 29 Nico Tellache; 27 Sam Whiting; Catchers: 15 Josh Caron; 7 Connor Charping; 40 Boston Smith; Infielders: 9 Caleb Cali; 4 Felnin Celesten; 38 Carter Dorighi; 23 Hunter Fitz-Gerald; 5 Charlie Pagliarini; 16 Austin St. Laurent; Outfielders: 31 Anthony Donofrio; 8 Jonny Farmelo; 3 Bill Knight; 2 Sammy Siani; 20 Jared Sundstrom	Manager: 25 Rich Thompson; Coaches: 10 Jordan Cowan (hitting); 18 Cameron Ming (pitching); 36 Jose Umbria (bench); 10 Daniel Amaral (first base); 60-day injured list: 16 Jimmy Joyce; 7-day injured list; * On Seattle Mariners 40-man roster; ~ Development list; # Rehab assignment; ∞ Reserve list; ‡ Restricted list; § Suspended list; † Temporarily inactive list; Roster updated September 28, 2026; Transactions; → More rosters: MiLB • Texas League; → Seattle Mariners minor league players

== General managers ==
=== Ray Winder ===
Ray Winder was the general manager for Little Rock Travelers when it became defunct in 1961 and continued as general manager for the Arkansas Travelers until 1976. Winder had worked as a ticket taker in 1915 before rising to general manager. More than once, he almost single-handedly kept baseball in Little Rock. In 1960, at the last minute, he used his relationships with major league teams to sign enough players for the Travelers to field a team—it had looked as if the team would not make or would have to move to another town. During his 50-plus years with the team, he saw the Travelers sink to the bottom of the league only to rise three times to the league championship.

=== Bill Valentine ===
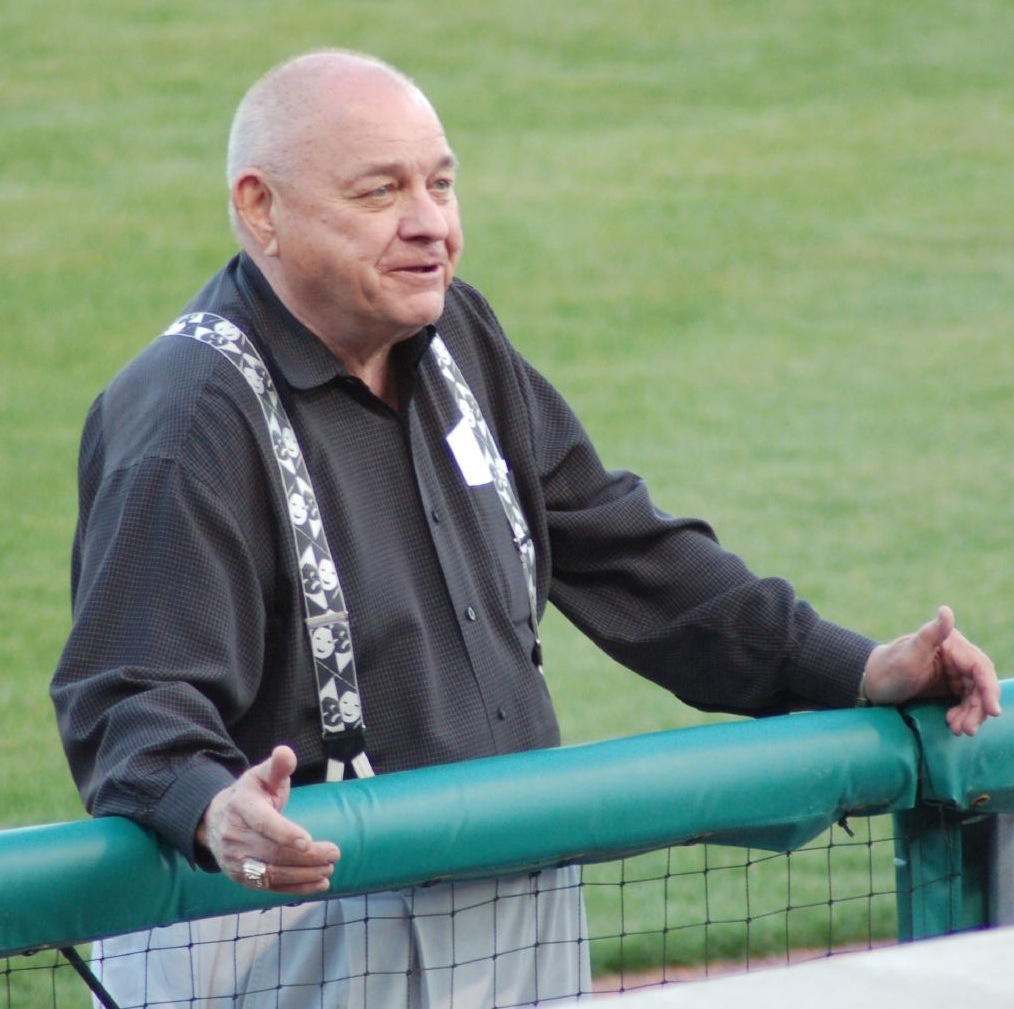
Bill Valentine

In 1976, Bill Valentine, a former American League umpire, became general manager for the Travelers. He would serve as general manager until 2007 and, after two seasons as an executive vice president for two more seasons, retired in March 2009. He also was a radio announcer for the team for eight years. In his first season as general manager, the team saw a 34% increase in attendance, due in part to Valentine's stunts including giving away tens of thousands of tickets to kids, hoping they would bring their parents to the game with them, and holding midget wrestling and amateur boxing at the stadium. The Travelers' attendance increased over the years and also saw on-field success, winning five league titles while Valentine was GM. Valentine has been inducted into the Arkansas Sports Hall of Fame, the Arkansas Officials Association Hall of Fame, the Texas League Hall of Fame, and the North Little Rock Boys Club Hall of Fame.

=== Pete Laven ===
Pete Laven became general manager of the Travelers in 2007 after serving as the club's assistant general manager from 2004 through 2006. Laven had originally joined the Travelers as a stadium operations intern in 1992 and later returned to the organization in 2000. He was named the Texas League Executive of the Year in 2006, the final season at Ray Winder Field, and served as general manager for six seasons from 2007 through 2012. His first season as general manager coincided with the opening of Dickey-Stephens Park in North Little Rock.

=== Paul Allen ===
Paul Allen was named general manager on January 18, 2013, after serving as interim general manager beginning in November 2012. Allen began his professional baseball career as a Travelers stadium operations intern at Ray Winder Field in 2005. After spending the 2006 season with the Birmingham Barons, he returned to the Travelers in 2007 as director of group sales and was promoted to assistant general manager before the 2010 season. He served as general manager until June 2021, leaving the organization for a position with Swagelok.

=== Sophie Ozier ===
Sophie Ozier became interim general manager effective July 1, 2021, following Allen's departure. Ozier had joined the Travelers in 2017 as a corporate event planner and later served as director of group sales and promotions before being promoted to assistant general manager in 2020. On November 9, 2021, the Travelers named her the permanent general manager, making her the first woman to hold the position in franchise history. Following the departure of team president Rusty Meeks in June 2025, Ozier remained general manager and became the club's top executive. As of September 2026, she continues to serve as general manager.
