= Texarkana Arkansas School District =

School district in Arkansas, United States

Location
- 3435 Jefferson Avenue; Texarkana, Arkansas 71854 United States

District information
- Type: Public (government funded)
- Grades: K-12
- Established: 1911
- Superintendent: Dr. Becky Kesler
- Accreditation(s): Arkansas Department of Education
- Schools: 9 (1 high school, 1 vocational center, 1 junior high, 1 middle school, 5 elementary schools)
- NCES District ID: 0513110

Students and staff
- Students: 4,430
- Teachers: 328.23
- Student–teacher ratio: 13.50
- Athletic conference: 6A South

Other information
- Website: www.tasd7.net

The Texarkana Arkansas School District (TASD) is a U.S. school district founded in 1911 serving Texarkana, Arkansas. It is district No. 7, and is part of Miller County, Arkansas. TASD7 established itself as a magnet school system in 2005 at the elementary and middle school levels and later expanded its magnet school program to include North Heights Jr. High and Arkansas High School in 2006.

== Schools ==
=== High schools ===
- Arkansas High School (9-12)

Magnet Academies: Arts, Career and Technology, International Studies, and Sciences

=== Middle schools ===
- Arkansas Middle School (6-8)

=== Elementary schools ===
- Edward R. Trice Elementary School (KG–5)
- Fairview Elementary School (KG–5), one of the first schools in the district, built in 1919 and operating since 1920. Rebuilt in 1992.
- Harmony Leadership Academy. (KG-5)
- Vera Kilpatrick Elementary School (PK–5)

=== Defunct schools ===
- Fairview Ward School, built in 1919. Burned down in the late 1980s.
- North Heights High School, built in 1939. Torn down in 2002.
- North Heights Elementary School, building date unknown. Fate unknown.
- Arkansas Senior High, built around the 1950s. Turned into 9th grade academy.
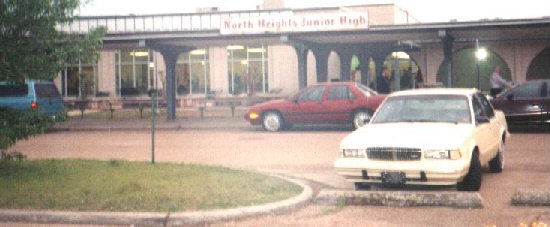
  NHJH in its early years.
- Union Elementary School
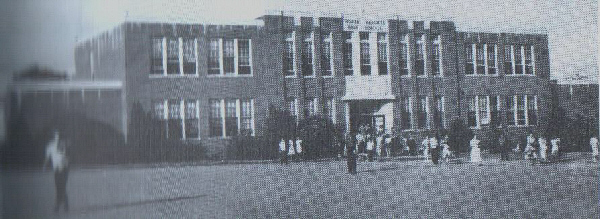
  The North Heights High School during its final years.

In 2007, College Hill Elementary International Studies received top honors by the U.S. Department of Education (ED) in being named a National Blue Ribbon School. College Hill Elementary is now a Pre-k Center.

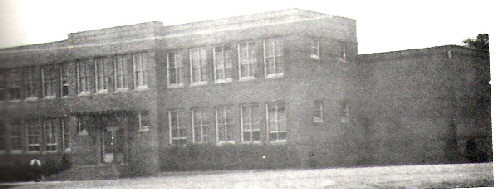
North Heights Elementary
