= Little Rock Travelers =

Defunct minor league baseball team

- 1887–1961; (1887, 1894–1895, 1897–1898, 1901–1909, 1915–1958; 1960–1961); Little Rock, Arkansas

Minor league affiliations
- Previous classes: Class AA (1946–1961); Class A1 (1936–1945); Class A (1902–1909, 1915–1935); Class B (1895, 1901)
- League: Southern Association (1901–1909, 1915–1961)
- Previous leagues: Southwestern League (1898); Arkansas State League (1897); Southern League (1895); Arkansas State League (1894); Southwestern League (1887)

Major league affiliations
- Previous teams: Baltimore Orioles (1961); Kansas City Athletics (1957–1958); Detroit Tigers (1948–1955); Boston Braves (1947); Chicago White Sox (1946); Boston Red Sox (1937–1939); Pittsburgh Pirates (1934)

Minor league titles
- League titles (2): 1937; 1960
- Pennants (4): 1920; 1937; 1942; 1951

Team data
- Previous names: Little Rock Travelers (1895, 1901–1909, 1915–1961); Little Rock (1898); Little Rock Senators (1897); Little Rock Rose Buds (1894); Little Rock Giants (1887)
- Previous parks: Travelers Field (1932–1961); Kavanaugh Field (1895, 1901–1909, 1915–1931)

The Little Rock Travelers were an American minor league baseball team located in Little Rock, Arkansas, and members (1902–1910, 1915–1958, 1960–1961) of the Southern Association, which as a Class A, A1 or Double-A circuit was typically two rungs below Major League Baseball.

When farm systems came into being in the 1930s, the Travelers were at different times affiliated with the Pittsburgh Pirates, Boston Red Sox, Boston Braves, Detroit Tigers, Kansas City Athletics, and Baltimore Orioles. After attracting fewer than 68,000 paying customers over a 77-game home schedule in 1958, the Travelers moved to Shreveport, Louisiana, in 1959 as the Shreveport Sports. In 1959, however, the New Orleans Pelicans moved to Little Rock and took the Travelers name.

But the Southern Association was in its death throes, and the Travelers went down with the entire league after the 1961 season. Little Rock did not field a team in 1962. In 1963, organized baseball returned to Little Rock with the Arkansas Travelers of the Triple-A International League. In both 1964 and 1965, the franchise played in the Triple-A Pacific Coast League before settling in the Double-A Texas League, where the Travelers have played since 1966. Currently, the Arkansas Travelers are the AA affiliate of the Seattle Mariners.

The team's name derives from the old folk song, The Arkansas Traveler.

The team played at Travelers Field starting in 1932, a facility that would long outlast its original tenant. Previously the team had played at Kavanaugh Field.

== Notable alumni ==
- Jim Bagby, Jr.
- Bo Belinsky
- Frank Bolling
- Al Brazle
- Tony Brottem
- George Brunet
- Jim Bunning
- Bill Dickey
- Chuck Essegian
- Nick Etten
- Pat Gillick
- Charlie Grimm
- Randy Gumpert
- Babe Herman
- Travis Jackson
- Baby Doll Jacobson
- Ken Johnson
- Eddie Lopat
- Tony Lupien
- Firpo Marberry
- Cass Michaels
- Bing Miller
- Bobo Newsom
- Dave Nicholson
- Howie Reed
- Cal Ripken, Sr.
- Jim Tabor
- John Tsitouris
- Aaron Ward
- Pete Ward
- Max West
- Wes Westrum
