= Texarkana, Arkansas =

City in Arkansas, United States

Texarkana
- City
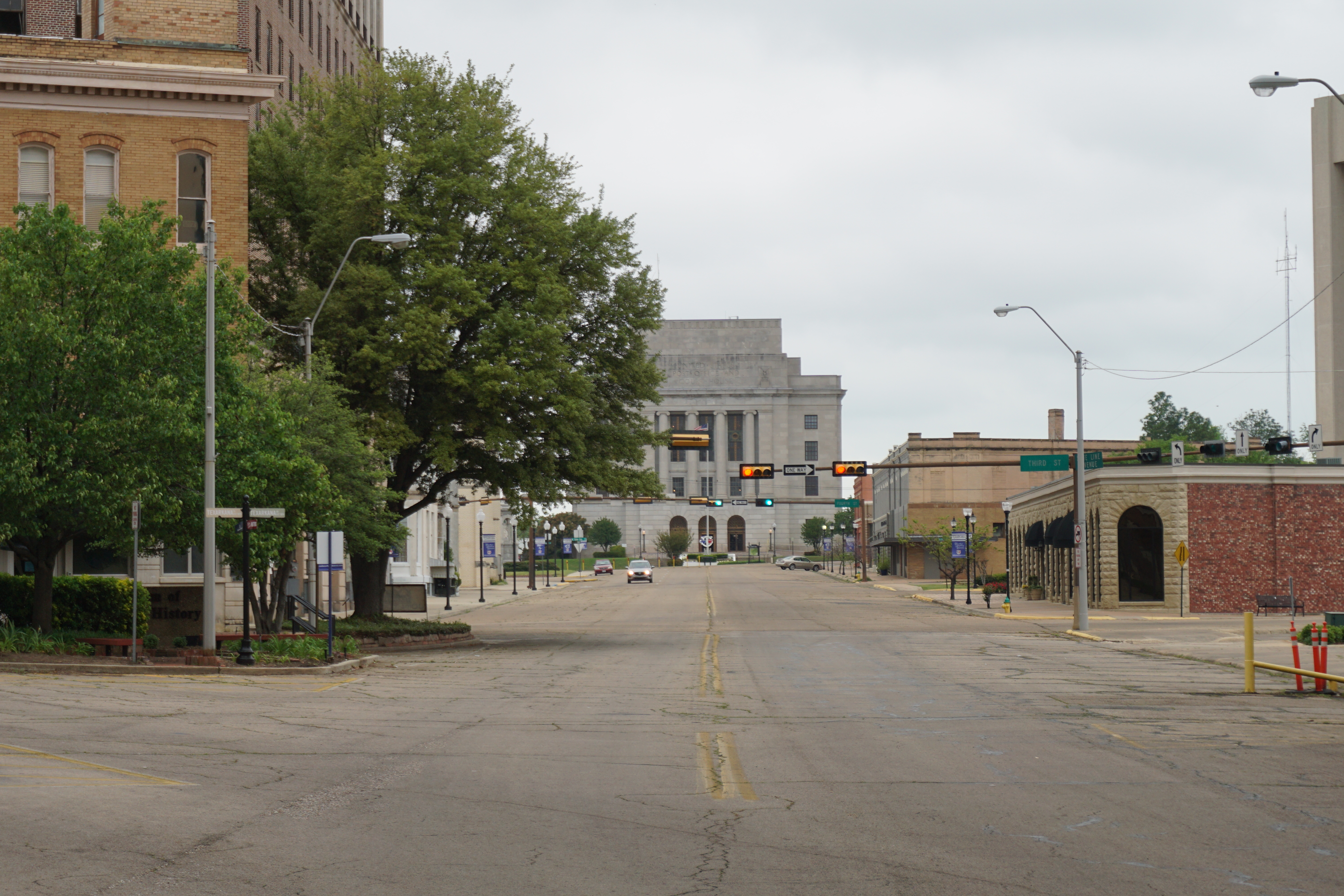
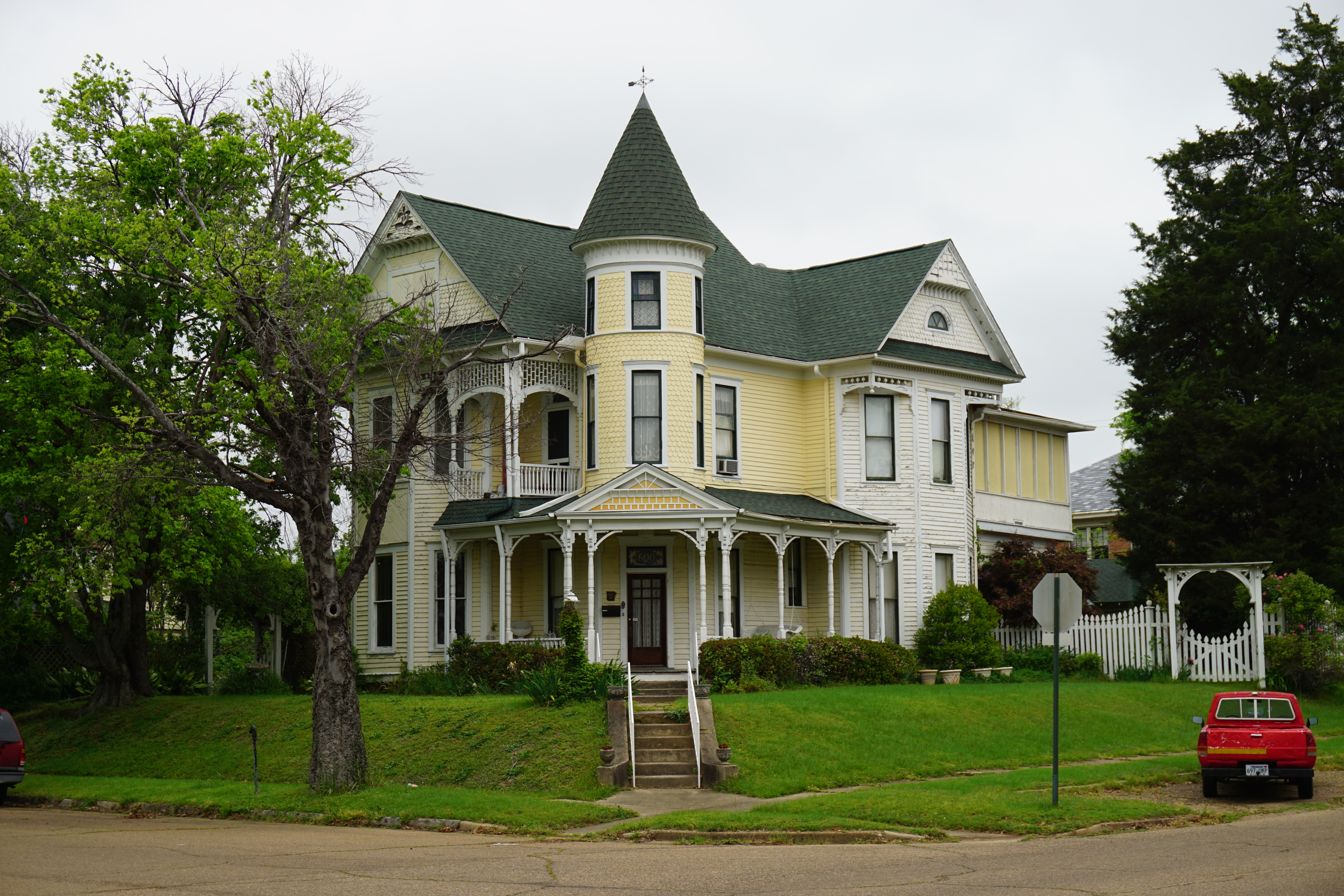
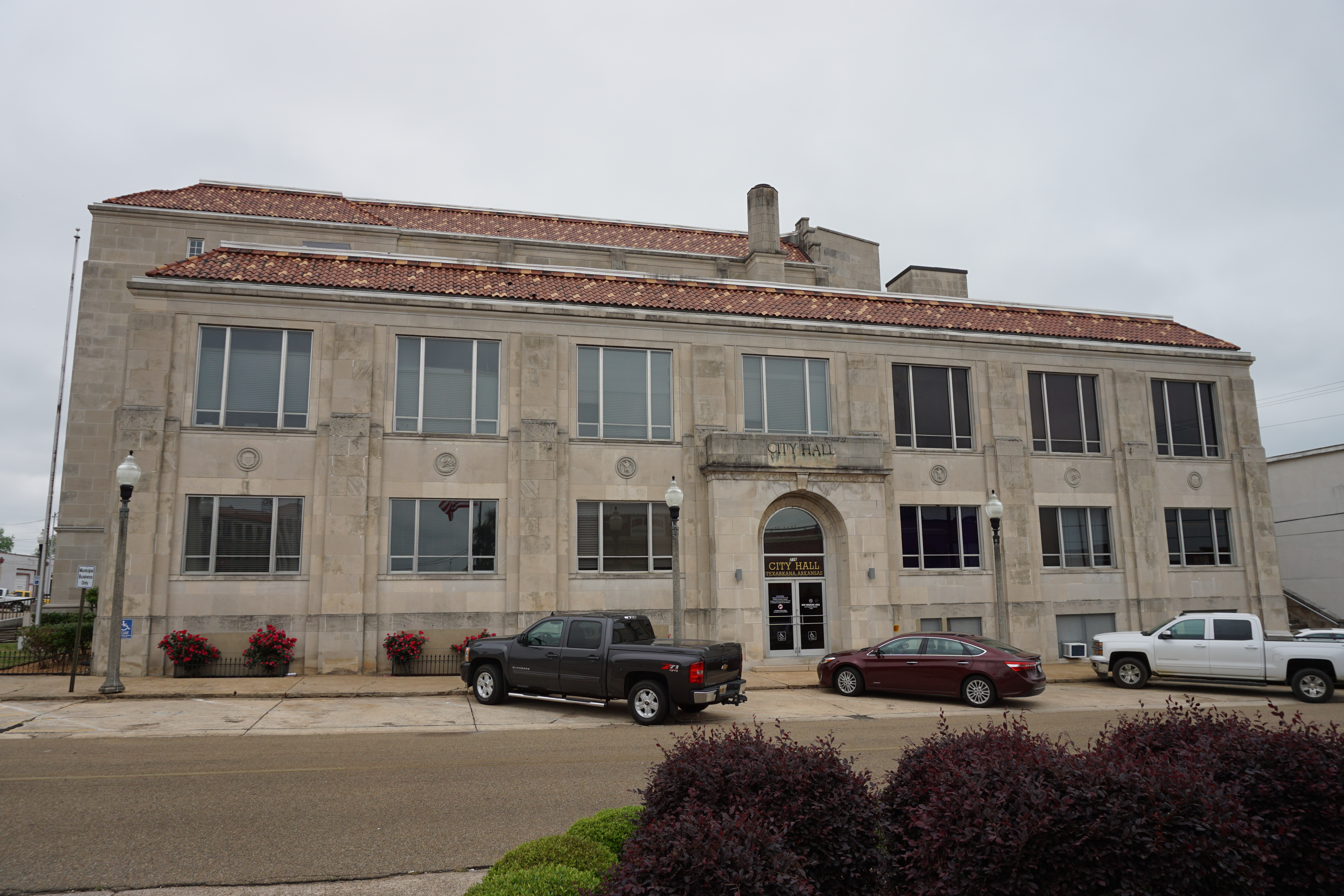
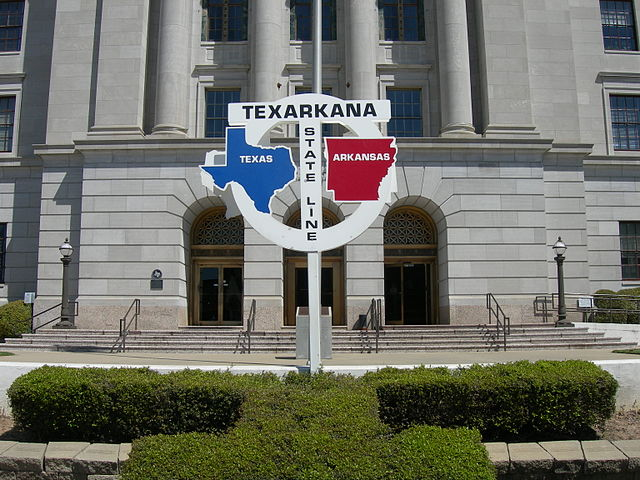
- From top, left to right: Downtown, Augustus M. Garrison House, Texarkana City Hall, Texarkana state line

- Flag Seal Logo
- Nicknames: The Arkansas Side, TXK
- Motto: "Twice as Nice"
- Location in Miller County, Arkansas

- Location within Arkansas Location within the United States Texarkana (North America)
- Coordinates: 33°28′12″N 94°00′30″W
- Country: United States
- State: Arkansas
- County: Miller
- Incorporated: August 10, 1880 (146 years ago)

Government
  - Type: Council-Manager
  - Mayor: Allen Brown

Area
  - Total: 42.20 sq mi (109.31 km^{2})
  - Land: 41.98 sq mi (108.72 km^{2})
  - Water: 0.23 sq mi (0.59 km^{2})
- Elevation: 358 ft (109 m)

Population (2020)
  - Total: 29,387
  - Estimate (2025): 29,123 ▼
  - Density: 700/sq mi (270.3/km^{2})
- Time zone: UTC−6 (Central (CST))
  - Summer (DST): UTC−5 (CDT)
- ZIP Code: 71854
- Area code: 870
- FIPS code: 05-68810
- GNIS feature ID: 2405580
- Website: texarkanaar.gov

Texarkana is a city in the U.S. state of Arkansas and the county seat of Miller County, on the southwest border of the state. As of the 2020 census, it had a population of 29,387. It is the twin city of Texarkana, Texas, located just across the state line. The city was founded at a railroad intersection on December 8, 1873, and was incorporated in Arkansas on August 10, 1880. Texarkana and its Texas counterpart are the principal cities of the Texarkana metropolitan area, which in 2021 was ranked 289th in the United States with a population of 147,174, according to the United States Census Bureau.

Within the Ark-La-Tex subregion of southwest Arkansas, Texarkana is located in the Piney Woods, an oak–hickory forest that dominates the flat Gulf Coastal Plain. Texarkana's economy is based on agriculture. The city has long been a trading center, first located at the intersection of major railroads serving Texas, Arkansas and north into Missouri. Since then three major Interstate highways constructed crossroads here: Interstate 30 (I-30), I-49, and the future I-69. The Red River Army Depot is the largest single employer in the city.

The Texarkana Arkansas School District is the largest public school district on the Arkansas side. The city has a branch campus of the University of Arkansas Hope-Texarkana (UAHT). Texarkana College is located on the Texas side.

== History ==
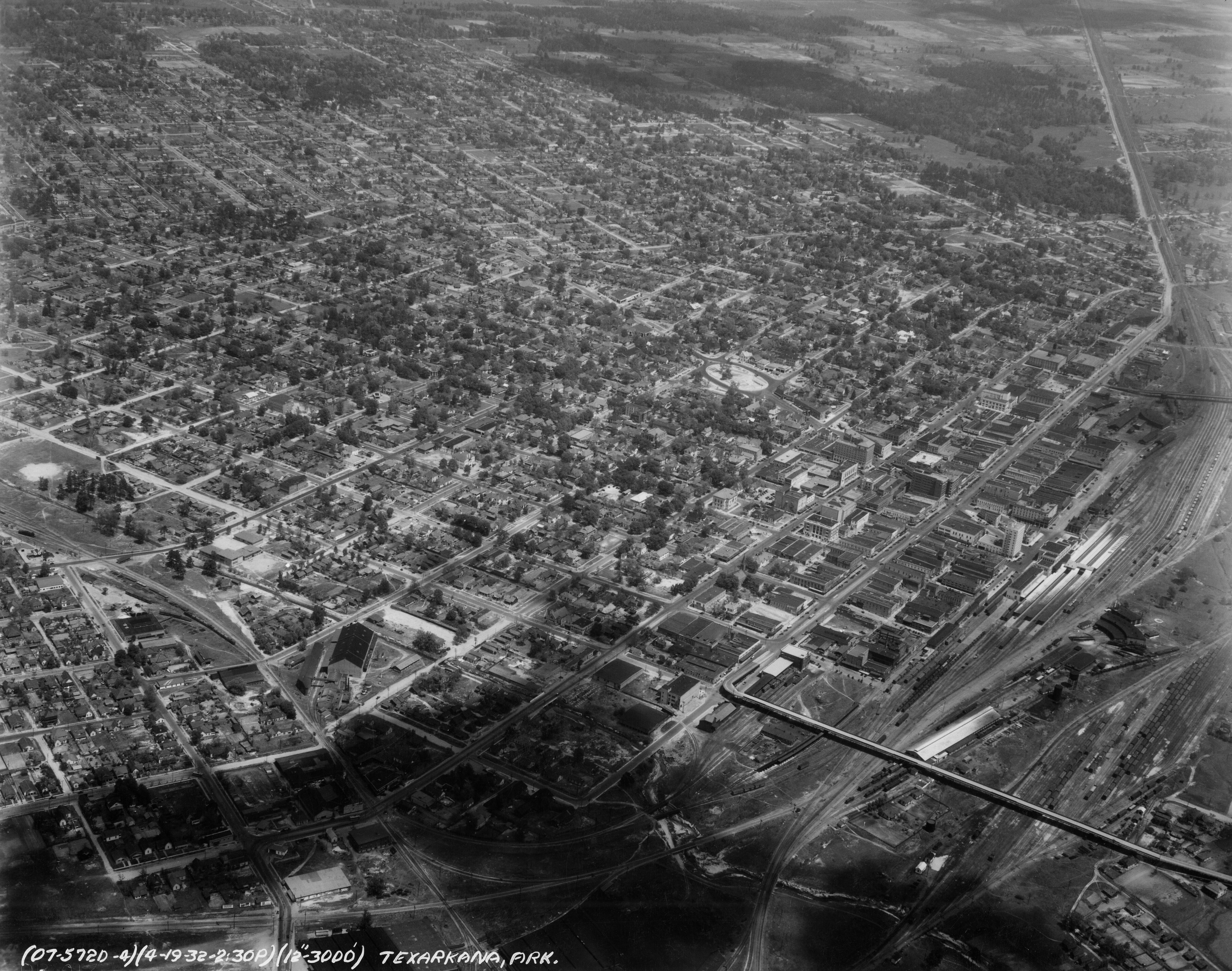
View of Texarkana, 1932

Miller County was formed in 1820 in the Arkansas Territory; it was named in honor of James Miller, Arkansas' first territorial governor and a general during the War of 1812. Much of its eastern border is formed by the Red River. At the time, there was considerable uncertainty among Americans as to the location of the boundary between the county (and the United States) and national territory of Mexico, which then included Texas.

Consequently, settlers believed that Arkansas levied and collected taxes on land that eventually might be held by Mexico. Moreover, many who resented what they considered Mexican oppression of European-American Texans were openly declaring allegiance to the Texans.

After the Texas Republic gained independence from Mexico, regional unrest increased. In 1838, Governor James Conway proposed that the "easiest and most effective remedy is the abolition of Miller County to an area which is more patriotic." Miller County was dissolved and its land was made part of Lafayette County, Arkansas.

In 1873 town lots were sold in Texarkana, Arkansas, at the intersection of two railroads, which stimulated its growth as a trading center. In this area and time period, railroads had replaced rivers as the preferred method of transportation and shipping, and new towns were sited for best advantage via the railroad. The next year (1874), Texarkana, Texas, was founded on the rail line on June 12 across the state border.

That same year, the Arkansas legislature re-established Miller County. Efforts of the young town in Arkansas to be incorporated were not realized until October 17, 1880, nearly seven years after Texarkana, Texas, was formed. Both Texarkana cities generally recognize December 8, 1873, as the date of organization.

On February 11, 1922, masked men lynched Mr. Norman, an African-American man, in Texarkana, Miller County, Arkansas. Lynchings were perpetrated by white men primarily against black males, although some black women were also lynched in the South.

== Geography ==
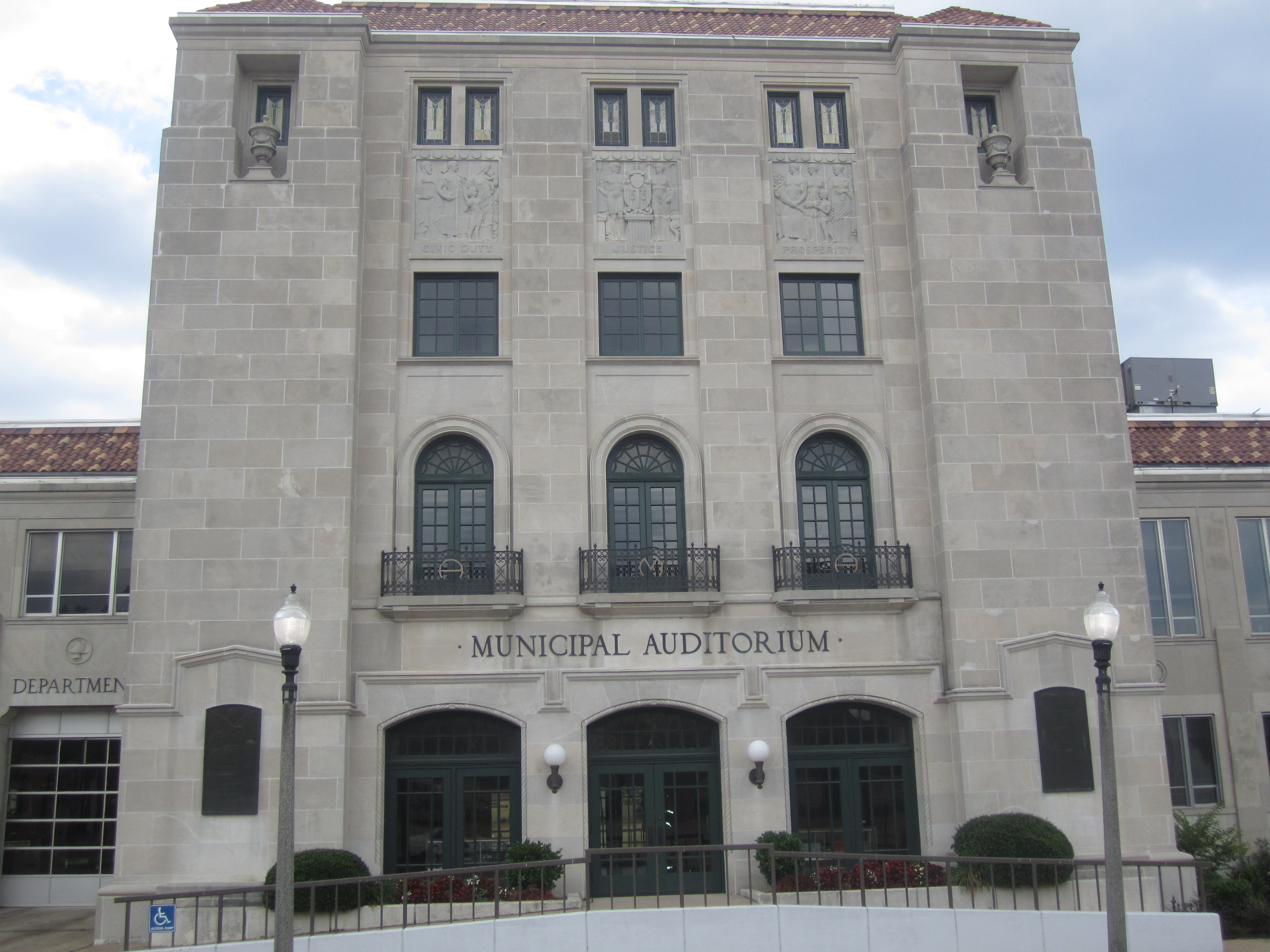
Municipal Auditorium is located in the City Hall complex.

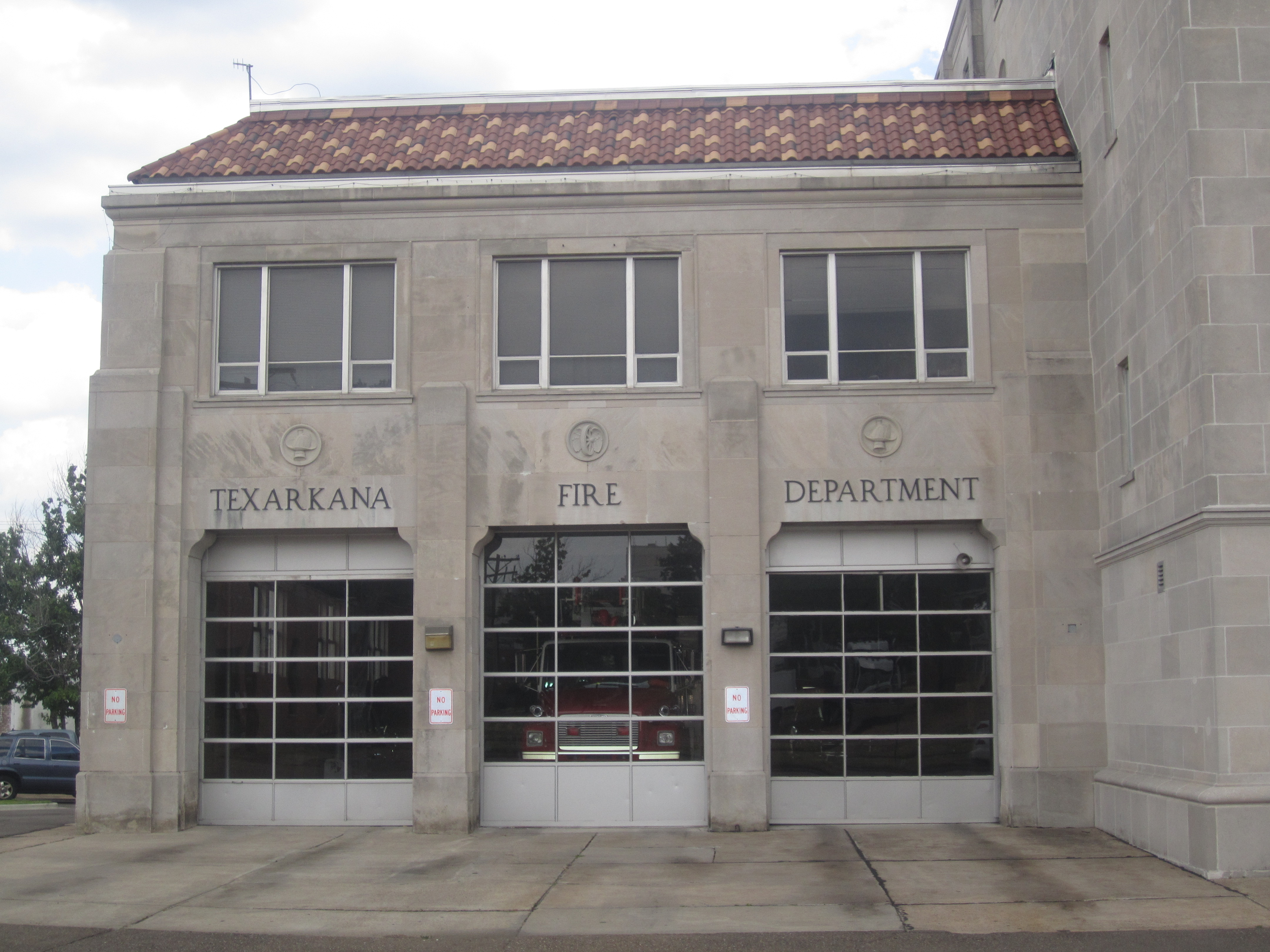
The Texarkana Fire Department adjoins the Municipal Auditorium.

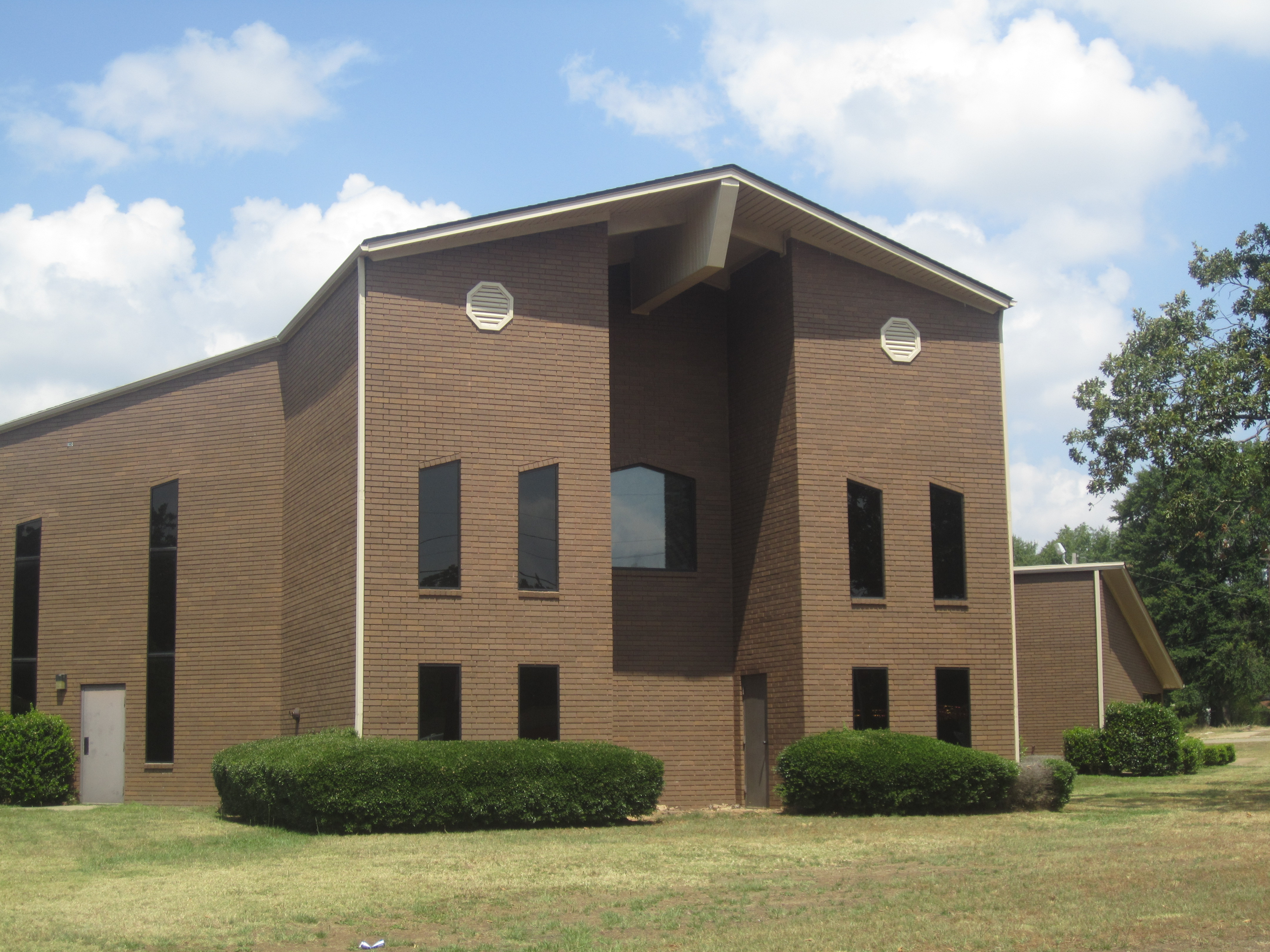
Highland Church of Christ at 1705 Highland Street

Texarkana is 143 miles (230 km) southwest of Little Rock, 72 miles (116 km) north of Shreveport, Louisiana, and 180 miles (290 km) northeast of Dallas, Texas. According to the United States Census Bureau, Texarkana has a total area of 42.2 square miles (109 km^{2}), of which 42.0 square miles (109 km^{2}) are land and 0.2 square miles (0.5 km^{2}), or 0.54%, are water. The city is mainly drained by Nix Creek, a southwest-flowing tributary of Days Creek, part of the Sulphur River watershed leading to the Red River.

=== Climate ===
The climate in this area is characterized by hot, humid summers and generally mild to cool winters. According to the Köppen Climate Classification system, Texarkana has a humid subtropical climate, abbreviated "Cfa" on climate maps.

Climate data for Texarkana, Arkansas (Webb Field), 1991–2020 normals, extremes 1892–present
Month	Jan	Feb	Mar	Apr	May	Jun	Jul	Aug	Sep	Oct	Nov	Dec	Year
Record high °F (°C)	85 (29)	90 (32)	94 (34)	95 (35)	100 (38)	108 (42)	110 (43)	117 (47)	108 (42)	104 (40)	89 (32)	85 (29)	117 (47)
Mean maximum °F (°C)	73.8 (23.2)	76.2 (24.6)	83.0 (28.3)	86.4 (30.2)	91.3 (32.9)	95.9 (35.5)	100.1 (37.8)	100.7 (38.2)	96.7 (35.9)	90.1 (32.3)	80.1 (26.7)	74.8 (23.8)	102.4 (39.1)
Mean daily maximum °F (°C)	54.0 (12.2)	58.2 (14.6)	66.7 (19.3)	74.5 (23.6)	81.6 (27.6)	88.7 (31.5)	92.7 (33.7)	92.8 (33.8)	86.4 (30.2)	76.0 (24.4)	64.3 (17.9)	55.7 (13.2)	74.3 (23.5)
Daily mean °F (°C)	44.6 (7.0)	48.3 (9.1)	56.0 (13.3)	63.6 (17.6)	71.6 (22.0)	78.9 (26.1)	82.5 (28.1)	82.0 (27.8)	75.4 (24.1)	64.9 (18.3)	53.9 (12.2)	46.4 (8.0)	64.0 (17.8)
Mean daily minimum °F (°C)	35.1 (1.7)	38.4 (3.6)	45.2 (7.3)	52.7 (11.5)	61.6 (16.4)	69.1 (20.6)	72.3 (22.4)	71.3 (21.8)	64.5 (18.1)	53.7 (12.1)	43.6 (6.4)	37.2 (2.9)	53.7 (12.1)
Mean minimum °F (°C)	19.0 (−7.2)	24.6 (−4.1)	29.7 (−1.3)	37.2 (2.9)	48.2 (9.0)	60.4 (15.8)	65.4 (18.6)	64.5 (18.1)	52.0 (11.1)	38.5 (3.6)	28.0 (−2.2)	22.9 (−5.1)	16.8 (−8.4)
Record low °F (°C)	−7 (−22)	−9 (−23)	11 (−12)	24 (−4)	35 (2)	50 (10)	56 (13)	51 (11)	37 (3)	21 (−6)	15 (−9)	−1 (−18)	−9 (−23)
Average precipitation inches (mm)	3.64 (92)	4.28 (109)	4.45 (113)	4.43 (113)	5.10 (130)	3.92 (100)	3.37 (86)	2.98 (76)	3.60 (91)	4.51 (115)	3.91 (99)	4.68 (119)	48.87 (1,241)
Average snowfall inches (cm)	1.6 (4.1)	0.2 (0.51)	0.0 (0.0)	0.0 (0.0)	0.0 (0.0)	0.0 (0.0)	0.0 (0.0)	0.0 (0.0)	0.0 (0.0)	0.0 (0.0)	0.0 (0.0)	0.9 (2.3)	2.7 (6.91)
Average precipitation days (≥ 0.01 in)	8.2	9.6	10.4	8.9	9.8	8.2	6.7	6.4	6.3	7.2	8.7	9.3	99.7
Average snowy days (≥ 0.1 in)	0.6	0.3	0.0	0.0	0.0	0.0	0.0	0.0	0.0	0.0	0.0	0.3	1.2
Source: NOAA (snow/snow days 1981–2010)

== Demographics ==
Historical population
Census	Pop.	Note	%±
1880	1,390		—
1890	3,528		153.8%
1900	4,914		39.3%
1910	5,655		15.1%
1920	8,257		46.0%
1930	10,764		30.4%
1940	11,821		9.8%
1950	15,875		34.3%
1960	19,788		24.6%
1970	21,682		9.6%
1980	21,459		−1.0%
1990	22,631		5.5%
2000	26,448		16.9%
2010	29,919		13.1%
2020	29,387		−1.8%
2025 (est.)	29,123	▼	−0.9%
U.S. Decennial Census

=== Racial and ethnic composition ===
Texarkana city, Arkansas – Racial and ethnic composition Note: the US Census treats Hispanic/Latino as an ethnic category. This table excludes Latinos from the racial categories and assigns them to a separate category. Hispanics/Latinos may be of any race.
Race / Ethnicity (NH = Non-Hispanic)	Pop 2000	Pop 2010	Pop 2020	% 2000	% 2010	% 2020
White alone (NH)	17,191	18,356	16,113	65.00%	61.35%	54.83%
Black or African American alone (NH)	8,163	9,853	10,347	30.86%	32.93%	35.21%
Native American or Alaska Native alone (NH)	122	160	158	0.46%	0.53%	0.54%
Asian alone (NH)	131	166	175	0.50%	0.55%	0.60%
Native Hawaiian or Pacific Islander alone (NH)	6	15	2	0.02%	0.05%	0.01%
Other race alone (NH)	19	30	102	0.07%	0.10%	0.35%
Mixed race or Multiracial (NH)	344	495	1,246	1.30%	1.65%	4.24%
Hispanic or Latino (any race)	472	844	1,244	1.78%	2.82%	4.23%
Total	26,448	29,919	29,387	100.00%	100.00%	100.00%

=== 2020 census ===
As of the 2020 census, Texarkana had a population of 29,387 and 11,831 households, of which 7,348 were families. The median age was 39.1 years. 23.0% of residents were under the age of 18 and 17.1% of residents were 65 years of age or older. For every 100 females there were 94.0 males, and for every 100 females age 18 and over there were 91.2 males age 18 and over.

86.5% of residents lived in urban areas, while 13.5% lived in rural areas.

There were 11,831 households in Texarkana, of which 30.0% had children under the age of 18 living in them. Of all households, 37.1% were married-couple households, 19.3% were households with a male householder and no spouse or partner present, and 36.7% were households with a female householder and no spouse or partner present. About 31.2% of all households were made up of individuals and 12.1% had someone living alone who was 65 years of age or older.

There were 13,593 housing units, of which 13.0% were vacant. The homeowner vacancy rate was 1.9% and the rental vacancy rate was 11.5%.

Racial composition as of the 2020 census
Race	Number	Percent
White	16,427	55.9%
Black or African American	10,408	35.4%
American Indian and Alaska Native	182	0.6%
Asian	175	0.6%
Native Hawaiian and Other Pacific Islander	2	0.0%
Some other race	604	2.1%
Two or more races	1,589	5.4%
Hispanic or Latino (of any race)	1,244	4.2%

=== 2016 estimates ===
The median income for a household in the city was $31,343, and the median income for a family was $38,292. Males had a median income of $35,204 versus $21,731 for females. The per capita income for the city was $17,130. About 17.2% of families and 21.7% of the population were below the poverty line, including 33.0% of those under age 18 and 15.7% of those age 65 or above.

== Government and infrastructure ==
The Arkansas Department of Correction operates the Texarkana Regional Correction Center in Texarkana.

Arkansas residents whose permanent residence is within the city limits of Texarkana, Arkansas, are exempt from Arkansas individual income taxes.

The Federal Courthouse (which holds the city's only post office) is located directly on the Arkansas-Texas state line. It is the only federal office building to straddle a state line.

According to the city's 2018 Comprehensive Annual Financial Report, the top employers in the area are:

1. Red River Army Depot & Tenants 4,135,
2. Christus St. Michael Health Care 1,800,
3. Cooper Tire & Rubber Company 1,750,
4. AECOM/URS 1,300,
5. Southern Refrigerated Transport 1,235,
6. Wal-Mart 1,200,
7. Texarkana TX Independent School District 1,150,
8. Domtar, Inc. 900,
9. Graphic Packaging 800,
10. Wadley Regional Medical Center 755,
11. Texarkana Arkansas School District 785,

=== Transportation ===
- Texarkana (Amtrak station)
- Texarkana Regional Airport

== Education ==
Public education for elementary and secondary school students is provided by two school districts:

- Texarkana Arkansas School District, which leads to graduating from Arkansas High School. The high school mascot is the Razorback. The University of Arkansas selected this mascot in exchange for giving the school some used athletic equipment. This practice no longer occurs.
- A very small portion of the city is within the Genoa Central School District, which leads to graduation from Genoa Central High School. The high school mascot is the Dragon; green and white serve as the school colors.

Private education opportunities include:

- Trinity Christian School, a Baptist school serving pre-kindergarten through grade 12.

In 2012, a branch of the University of Arkansas Community College at Hope was established at Texarkana. It is known as University of Arkansas Hope-Texarkana (UAHT). In 2015 UAHT began partnering with the University of Arkansas Little Rock, to offer bachelor's degree programs through UALR Texarkana, with classes held on the UAHT Texarkana campus.

== Pop culture ==
- In 2016, a video of a Texarkana minister defending LGBT rights in a speech went viral online.
- Cornelius, a random sorghum seedling that struggled to survive in a crack in the sidewalk in 2024. By early October 2024, Cornelius had sprouted and found a Facebook following numbering in double digits.
- The town, along with its counterpart across the state line of Texas, is the location setting of the cult-classic film, The Town That Dreaded Sundown.

== Notable people ==
- Buster Benton, blues singer-guitarist
- Ben M. Bogard, founder in 1924 of the American Baptist Association
- Mike Cherry, New York Giants football, Murray State quarterback
- Willie Davis, player with Green Bay Packers in the NFL and Super Bowl champion
- Martin Delray, country music singer
- Wayne Dowd, Arkansas state senator and lawyer
- Wilhelm L. Friedell, U.S. Navy rear admiral, Navy Cross recipient, and submariner
- Mike Huckabee, governor; pastored Beech Street First Baptist Church, 1986–1992
- Parnelli Jones, 1963 Indianapolis 500 champion
- Scott Joplin, composer and pianist of ragtime music
- Jeff Keith, lead singer of rock band Tesla
- Dana Kimmell, actress
- A. Lynn Lowe, farmer and former Arkansas Republican Party state chairman
- Jimmy Means, NASCAR driver and owner
- Bryce Mitchell, professional mixed martial artist competing in the UFC
- Dustin Moseley, Major League Baseball player with the San Diego Padres in the MLB
- Conlon Nancarrow, composer who specialized in works for the player piano
- Charles B. Pierce, director and movie producer of The Legend of Boggy Creek and The Town That Dreaded Sundown
- Don Rogers, football player with Cleveland Browns in the NFL
- Mike Ross, former congressman and 2014 Arkansas gubernatorial nominee
- Max Sandlin, former congressman from Texas, and husband of former congresswoman Stephanie Herseth Sandlin
- Rod Smith, football player with the Denver Broncos in the NFL; two-time Super Bowl Champion
- Jasper Taylor, early jazz drummer, recorded with Jelly Roll Morton, Freddy Keppard, many others
- Jerry Turner, former Major League Baseball outfielder
- Pamela Veuleman Trammell, President General of the United Daughters of the Confederacy
- Dennis Woodberry, player with Washington Redskins in the NFL and one-time Super Bowl champion
