= Arkansas High School =

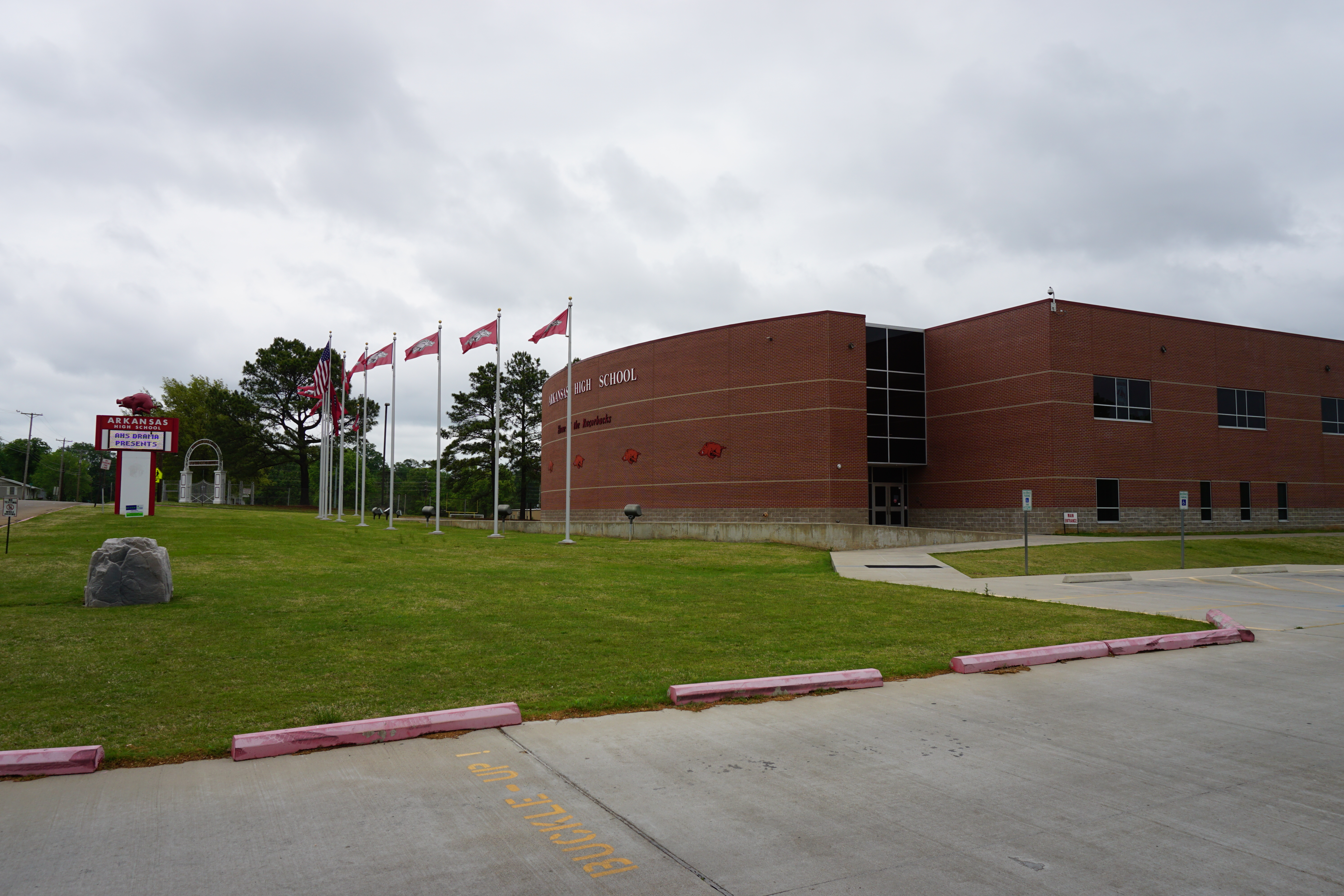

Location
- 1500 Jefferson Avenue; Texarkana, Arkansas 71854; United States
- Coordinates: 33°26′10″N 94°1′47″W

Information
- Funding type: Public (government funded)
- Status: Open
- School district: Texarkana Arkansas School District
- NCES District ID: 0513110
- CEEB code: 042403
- NCES School ID: 051311001068
- Principal: Michael D. Odom
- Faculty: 110.70 (on FTE basis)
- Grades: 9–12
- Enrollment: 1,009 (2017–18)
- Classes offered: Regular; Advanced Placement (AP)
- Campus type: Urban
- Colors: Red and white
- Athletics conference: 5A South
- Mascot: Razorback
- Nickname: Hogs
- Team name: Texarkana Arkansas Razorbacks or Arkansas High Razorbacks
- Rival: Texas High School
- Feeder schools: North Heights Jr. High School
- Affiliation: Arkansas Activities Association; University of Arkansas Community College at Hope
- Website: ahs.tasd7.net

Arkansas High School is a public secondary school in Texarkana in Miller County in southwestern Arkansas. The school serves students from ninth through twelve grade and is administered by the Texarkana Arkansas School District.

== Academics ==
The assumed course of study is the Smart Core curriculum developed by the Arkansas Department of Education (ADE). Students may complete regular courses and exams and may select Advanced Placement (AP) coursework and exams that provide an opportunity for college credit. Arkansas High School maintains a partnership with University of Arkansas Community College at Hope (UACCH) for students to complete college coursework and receive concurrent credit.

== Athletics ==
The Arkansas High School mascot and athletic emblem is the Razorback with red and white serving as the school colors. The high school mascot of the Razorback was selected in 1910 to replace the Cardinal as the University of Arkansas mascot. In exchange for its use, the university provided used athletic gear; the practice is no longer continued.

As of 2018, the Arkansas High Razorbacks participate in interscholastic sports within class 5A, administered by the Arkansas Activities Association. The Razorbacks compete in football, volleyball (girls only), basketball (boys/girls), bowling (boys/girls), cross country (boys/girls), golf (boys only), soccer (boys/girls), softball, competitive cheer and dance, tennis (boys/girls), track & field (boys/girls), baseball, and fastpitch softball.

=== Football ===
The Razorback football teams have seen success throughout the years, including winning three consecutive state championships in 1973, 1974 and 1975, then winning the first two 6A state championships in 2006 and 2007 and in 2010 made a surprise run with a 4–6 regular season record, went on the play El Dorado in the championship game only to fall short 31-21 ending the season 7-7. Currently, the Razorbacks are coached by Barry Norton, who most recently coached at archrival Texas High School.

=== Baseball ===
The Razorback baseball team is one of the state's most successful with 13 state championship title game appearances and five state championships (1976, 1982, 1994, 2000, 2007). As of 2011–12, the Razorbacks have been to 33 state tournaments, 20 state semifinals, and winners of 58 state tournament games.

=== Track and field ===
The Razorback boys track and field squads have lifted the state championship trophy on thirteen occasions (1959, 1978–80, 1993–94, 1996,2013-2017, 2021). The Lady Razorback girls track and field teams have led the school to six state championships (1996–97, 2008–10, 2012–14.)

=== Gymnastics ===
Prior to gymnastics ending as an Arkansas high school sport in 2006–07, the gymnastics team won four consecutive state championships (1975–78).

== Notable alumni ==
The following are notable people associated with Arkansas High School. If the person was an Arkansas High School student, the number in parentheses indicates the year of graduation; if the person was a faculty or staff member, that person's title and years of association are included:

- Billy Bock (Educator/coach) — Late college and high school coach; led Razorbacks to 1982 state baseball title.
- Mike Cherry—Drafted by the New York Giants in the 6th round (171st overall) of the 1997 NFL Draft.
- Hayes McClerkin - Member of Arkansas House of Representatives (1960–1970), law professor.
- Carol Dalby - member of the Arkansas House of Representatives from 2017 to present
- Sharon Fort — substance abuse counselor and first Black woman to join the Arkansas Society Daughters of the American Revolution
- Dennis Johnson (running back) (2008)— Former NFL running back with the Houston Texans and Cleveland Browns.
- George Lavender (1973)—Republican member of the Texas House of Representatives from Texarkana, Texas.
- Tony McKnight - (MLB Player)
- Dustin Moseley - (MLB Player) Drafted by the Reds, in the 2000 mlb draft played for the Angels, Yankees and Padres before retiring
- Rod Smith—Retired professional football player who won two Super Bowls as a member of the Denver Broncos.
- Eric Warfield (American Football) Drafted by the Kansas City Chiefs in the 7th round (216th overall) of the 1998 NFL draft.
- Dennis Woodberry (American Football) Drafted by the Atlanta Falcons in the 3rd round of the 1984 NFL supplemental draft of USFL and CFL players.
