= List of Arkansas state high school basketball champions =

This is a list of Arkansas state high school basketball championships sanctioned by the Arkansas Activities Association.

Listings include champions at each classification level based on size. Each classification is based on how large the school is, 6A schools being the biggest, and 1A schools being the smallest. Early years of high school basketball were limited to a single state championship.

== List of Arkansas state high school boys basketball champions ==
- 2026 – Bryant (3), Parkview (15), Hall (11), Osceola (8), Barton, Earle (12)
- 2025 – Bryant (2), Benton, Mills (5), Osceola (7), EPC (5), Earle (11)
- 2024 – Central (20), Pine Bluff (15), Little Rock Christian (3), Central Arkansas Christian, East Poinsett County (4), Marked Tree (2)
- 2023 – Jonesboro (16), Pine Bluff (14), Little Rock Christian (2), Manila (2), Bigelow, County Line
- 2022 – North Little Rock (16), Jonesboro (15), Magnolia (10), Osceola (6), Lavaca, Bradley
- 2021 – North Little Rock (15), Jonesboro (14), Little Rock Mills University Studies (4), Harding Academy (2), Lee (2), Viola
- 2020 – Little Rock Central (19) and Conway (5) co-champs, West Memphis (7) and Jacksonville (3) co-champs, Little Rock Mills University Studies (3) and Magnolia (9) co-champs, Rivercrest and Osceola (5) co-champs, England (3), Nevada (1) (7A, 6A, 5A, and 4A games cancelled due to COVID-19 pandemic; both finalists in each classification were awarded state titles)
- 2019 – FS Northside (11), Marion, Magnolia (8), Ashdown, England (2), Izard County (2)
- 2018 – North Little Rock (14), Jonesboro (13), (14), Baptist Prep (6), McGehee, Earle (10), Guy-Perkins (6)
- 2017 – FS Northside (10), Jonesboro (12), Little Rock Mills University Studies (2), Baptist Prep (5), Episcopal Collegiate (3), Earle (9), Guy-Perkins (5)
- 2016 – Cabot, LR Parkview (13), Forrest City (2), Arkansas Baptist (4), Cedar Ridge (3), Earle (8), Bay (5)
- 2015 – North Little Rock (13), Pine Bluff (13), LR McClellan (3), Monticello (2), Episcopal Collegiate (2), England, Bay (4)
- 2014 – North Little Rock (12)*, Jonesboro (11), Forrest City, Brookland, Episcopal Collegiate, Cedar Ridge (2), Concord
- 2013 – North Little Rock (11), Hall (10), Jacksonville (2), Pottsville, Harding Academy, Cedar Ridge, Bay (3)
- 2012 – LR Hall (9), LR Parkview (12), Sylvan Hills, Clarksville(5), Earle (7), East Poinsett County (3), Mammoth Spring
- 2011 – LR Hall (8), LR Parkview (11), Alma (2), Clarksville (4), Rivercrest, East Poinsett County (2), Bay (2)
- 2010 – Conway (4), LR Hall (7), LR McClellan (2), Jonesboro Westside, Earle (6), Hughes, Wonderview
- 2009 – Fayetteville(5), Jacksonville, Greene County Tech (2), Stuttgart, Arkansas Baptist (3), Conway St. Joseph, Guy–Perkins (4)
- 2008 – LR Catholic, LR Hall (6), Siloam Springs, Lonoke (5), Rose Bud, Earle (5), Izard County
- 2007 – FS Northside (9), Jonesboro (10), Greene County Tech, Huntsville, Riverview, Junction City, Fayetteville Christian
- 2006 – LR Parkview (10), Blytheville (3), Dollarway, Buffalo Island Central (4), Guy–Perkins (3)
- 2005 – West Memphis (6), Alma, LR Christian, Buffalo Island Central (3), Guy–Perkins (2)
- 2004 – West Memphis (5), Mills University Studies, East Poinsett County, Altheimer (2), Waldo (4)
- 2003 – Pine Bluff (12), LR Fair (3), Pulaski Academy (2), Altheimer, Weiner
- 2002 – LR Parkview (9), Osceola (4), Pulaski Academy, Poyen, Viola
- 2001 – LR Hall (5), Osceola (3), Clarksville(3), Marked Tree, Emerson
- 2000 – LR Fair (2), HS Lakeside, Lonoke (4), Earle (4), Turrell (2)
- 1999 – LR Central (18), Watson Chapel, Lonoke (3), Arkansas Baptist (2), Turrell
- 1998 – LR Parkview (8), Hot Springs (3), Clarksville (2), Stephens, Walker
- 1997 – West Memphis (4), Magnolia (7), Clarksville, Arkansas Baptist, Guy–Perkins
- 1996 – LR Fair, Hot Springs (2), Hamburg, Valley Springs (6), Saratoga (2)
- 1995 – LR Parkview (7), Searcy, Atkins, Crawfordsville, Saratoga
- 1994 – Jonesboro (9), Dumas (4), Dermott (4), Bradley, Delight
- 1993 – LR Parkview (6), Dumas (3), Hamburg, Buffalo Island Central (2), Wabbaseka (5)
- 1992 – LR Parkview (5), Stuttgart, Eudora, Buffalo Island Central, Kingsland
- 1991 – West Memphis (3), Morrilton (2), Dermott (3), Delta, Wabbaseka (4)
- 1990 – Pine Bluff (11), Malvern (2), Star City, Caddo Hills, Parkdale
- 1989 – Blytheville (2), Malvern, Dermott (2), Delta (2), Wabbaseka (3)
- 1988 – LR Parkview (4), Trumann, Gosnell, Marked Tree, McNeil (3)
- 1987 – Fayetteville (4), Dumas (2), Pulaski Robinson, Delta, Parkdale
- 1986 – Blytheville, Hope, Dermott, Wabbaseka (2), St. Joseph
- 1985 – Russellville, Magnolia (6), Stamps, Earle (3), Carthage
- 1984 – LR Hall (4), Harrison, Drew Central (2), Wabbaseka, Parkdale
- 1983 – LR Hall (3), Marianna, Camden Fairview, Drew Central, West Side GF, Violet Hill
- 1982 – LR Hall (2), El Dorado, Lonoke (2), Gurdon, Valley Springs (5), Blevins
- 1981 – LR Hall, West Memphis (2), Bryant, Marvell, Crawfordsville, Wilmar
- 1980 – LR Central (17), West Memphis, Magnolia (5), Earle (2), Grady, Parkdale (2)
- 1979 – Pine Bluff (10), Blytheville, Osceola (2), Lake Village, Marmaduke (2), Parkdale
- 1978 – LR Parkview (3), Fayetteville (3), Dumas, Star City, Marmaduke, Plumerville
- 1977 – Pine Bluff (9), Texarkana, Osceola (1), Stephens, McNeil (2)
- 1976 – El Dorado, Conway (3), Monticello, Holly Grove, McNeil
- 1975 – LR Central (16), Fayetteville (2), Magnolia (4), Drew Central, Nemo Vista
- 1974 – FS Northside (8), Conway (2), Magnolia (3), Earle, Village
- 1973 – LR Central (15), Conway, Morrilton, Stamps, Vaster
- 1972 – LR Central (14), LR Parkview (2), Magnolia (2), Stephens (2), Menifee
- 1971 – NLR Ole Main (10), LR Parkview, Magnolia, Stephens, County Line
- 1970 – LR Central (13), LR McClellan, Searcy, Ouachita, Stephens Carver
- 1969 – North Little Rock (9), Camden Lincoln, Lonoke, Desha Central
- 1968 – FS Northside (7), Crossett, Green Forest (2), Pyatt
- 1967 – North Little Rock (8), Harrison, Green Forest, Taylor
- 1966 – LR Central (12), White Hall, Mountain Home, Greenbrier (2)
- 1965 – FS Northside (6), Newport, Greenbrier, Bay
- 1964 – North Little Rock (7), Brinkley, Delight
- 1963 – Monticello, Paragould, Lake Hamilton
- 1962 – Jonesboro (8), Manila, Sparkman
- 1961 – Helena–West Helena, Nettleton, Valley Springs (4)
- 1960 – Leachville, Mulberry, Jasper
- 1959 – Fort Smith (5), Ouachita, Pyatt, NLR Jones (4)
- 1958 – Fort Smith (4), Sheridan, Marmaduke, NLR Jones (3)
- 1957 – Rogers, Viola, NLR Jones (2)
- 1956 – Jonesboro (7), Valley View, NLR Jones
- 1955 – Fort Smith (3), Delight
- 1954 – Jonesboro (6), Oden
- 1953 – Clinton, Bergman
- 1952 – Pine Bluff (8), Valley Springs (3)
- 1951 – Fort Smith (2), Valley Springs (2)
- 1950 – Van Buren, Valley Springs
- 1949 – North Little Rock (2), Arkansas School/Deaf
- 1948 – Fayetteville, Oden
- 1947 – Little Rock (11), Ouachita
- 1946 – Little Rock (10), Marshall
- 1945 – Little Rock (9), HS Lakeside
- 1944 – Little Rock (8), Center Ridge
- 1943 – North Little Rock, Formosa
- 1942 – Jonesboro (5), Marshall
- 1941 – Beebe, Judsonia
- 1940 – Jonesboro (4), New Edinburg
- 1939 – Ash Flat, Violet Hill
- 1938 – Jonesboro (3)
- 1937 – Jonesboro (2)
- 1936 – Coal Hill
- 1935 – Pine Bluff (7)
- 1934 – Pine Bluff (6)
- 1933 – Pine Bluff (5)
- 1932 – Hot Springs
- 1931 – Warren
- 1930 – Western Grove
- 1929 – Little Rock (7)
- 1928 – Pine Bluff (4)
- 1927 – Batesville
- 1926 – Pine Bluff (3)
- 1925 – Fort Smith
- 1924 – Pine Bluff (2)
- 1923 – Pine Bluff
- 1922 – Texarkana (3)
- 1921 – Leslie
- 1920 – Little Rock (6)
- 1919 – Texarkana (2)
- 1918 – Little Rock (5)
- 1917 – Little Rock (4)
- 1916 – Jonesboro
- 1915 – Stuttgart (2)
- 1914 – Stuttgart
- 1913 – Little Rock (3)
- 1912 – Little Rock (2)
- 1911 – Jonesboro Woodland College
- 1910 – Little Rock
- 1909 – Texarkana

Notes:

1. Little Rock HS became Little Rock Central in 1955.
2. Fort Smith HS became FS Northside in 1963.
3. North Little Rock Ole Main HS and NLR Jones HS merged in 1970.
- North Little Rock has vacated the 2014 title.

=== Past overall boys basketball champions ===
From 1972 to 1992, the Arkansas Activities Association organized an overall state championship tournament of the classification state champions.

- 1992 – LR Parkview (2)
- 1991 – West Memphis (3)
- 1990 – Pine Bluff (2)
- 1989 – Blytheville
- 1988 – LR Parkview
- 1987 – Fayetteville
- 1986 – Dermott
- 1985 – Magnolia
- 1984 – LR Hall (2)
- 1983 – LR Hall
- 1982 – Gurdon
- 1981 – West Memphis (2)
- 1980 – West Memphis
- 1979 – Parkdale
- 1978 – Dumas
- 1977 – Pine Bluff
- 1976 – Conway
- 1975 – LR Central (3)
- 1974 – FS Northside
- 1973 – LR Central (2)
- 1972 – LR Central

=== Most boys basketball championships ===
- 20 - Little Rock/LR Central
- 16 - Jonesboro
- 16 - North Little Rock
- 15 - LR Parkview
- 15 - Pine Bluff
- 12 - Earle
- 11 - Fort Smith/FS Northside
- 11 - LR Hall
- 10 - Magnolia

== List of Arkansas state high school girls basketball champions ==
- 2026 – North Little Rock (6), Farmington (6), Pulaski Academy, Manila, Quitman (2), Earle (3)
- 2025 – Northside (9), Farmington (5), De Queen (2), Lamar (2), Izard County, West Side (2)
- 2024 – LR Central (1), Greenwood (7), Farmington (4), Bergman, Mount Vernon-Enola, Mammoth Spring
- 2023 – Conway (3), Greenwood (6), Farmington (3), Salem, Mount Vernon-Enola, Mammoth Spring
- 2022 – North Little Rock (5), Greenwood (5), Nashville, Bergman, Melbourne (4), Norfork
- 2021 – FS Northside (8), Jonesboro (3), Harrison (5), Mayflower, Melbourne (3), Rural Special
- 2020 – Bentonville/Fayetteville, Nettleton/Greenwood, Farmington/Star City, Mtn. View/Valley Springs, Melbourne, Kirby
- 2019 – FS Northside (6A) (7), LR Christian (5A), Batesville (4A) (6), Mountain View (3A) (2), Melbourne (2A) (2), Wonderview (1A) (3)
- 2018 – North Little Rock (7A), Jonesboro (6A) (2), Hot Springs (5A), Central Arkansas Christian (4A) (4), Charleston (3A), Earle (2A), Wonderview (1A) (2)
- 2017 – Fayetteville (7A), Marion (6A), Watson Chapel (5A), Pocahontas (4A), Hoxie (3A), Quitman (2A), Bay (1A)
- 2016 – North Little Rock (7A), Jonesboro (6A), Watson Chapel (5A), Riverview (4A), Valley Springs (3A), Earle (2A), Nemo Vista (1A)
- 2015 – Fayetteville (7A), Greenwood (6A), Hot Springs (5A), Riverview (4A), Greenland (3A), Marmaduke (2A), Nemo Vista (1A)
- 2014 – Conway (7A), Greenwood (6A), Paragould (5A), Malvern (4A), eStem (3A), Spring Hill (2A), Nemo Vista (1A)
- 2013 – FS Northside (7A), LR Hall (6A), Jacksonville (5A), Malvern (4A), Greenland (3A), Norphlet (2A), Nevada (1A)
- 2012 – Cabot, LR Parkview, Greenwood, Star City, Greenland, England, Wonderview
- 2011 – Fayetteville, El Dorado, Watson Chapel, Shiloh Christian, Mountain View, England, Calico Rock
- 2010 – North Little Rock, Watson Chapel, Greenwood, Prairie Grove, Valley Springs, Conway Christian, Kirby
- 2009 – Fayetteville, Lake Hamilton, Vilonia, Shiloh Christian, Charleston, Danville, Scranton
- 2008 – Conway, Watson Chapel, Camden Fairview, Huntsville, Marshall, Carlisle, Kingston
- 2007 – FS Northside, LR Parkview, Camden Fairview, Central Arkansas Christian, Marshall, Carlisle, Sacred Heart
- 2006 – North Little Rock, Morrilton, Central Arkansas Christian, Strong, Sacred Heart
- 2005 – LR Parkview, Alma, Central Arkansas Christian, Strong-Huttig, Guy-Perkins
- 2004 – LR Parkview, Harrison, Farmington, Harding Academy, Wickes
- 2003 – West Memphis, Morrilton, De Queen, Poyen, Guy-Perkins
- 2002 – FS Northside, Harrison, Highland, Greenland, Guy-Perkins
- 2001 – FS Northside, Harrison, Ozark, Palestine-Wheatley, Guy-Perkins
- 2000 – FS Northside, Harrison, Ozark, Greenland, Bradley
- 1999 – FS Northside, Siloam Springs, Dover, Greenland, Mt. Pleasant
- 1998 – FS Southside, Hot Springs, Ozark, Tuckerman, St. Joseph
- 1997 – LR Hall, Hot Springs, Huntsville, Caddo Hills, Van-Cove
- 1996 – FS Southside, Greene County Tech, Pocahontas, County Line, Van-Cove
- 1995 – Pine Bluff, Lake Hamilton, Mena, East Poinsett, West Side GF
- 1994 – Fayetteville, Ridgecrest, Pocahontas, Valley Springs, Emerson
- 1993 – Fayetteville, Greene County Tech, Vilonia, Caddo Hills, Delta
- 1992 – West Memphis, Batesville, Dardanelle, Nevada, Alpena
- 1991 – Bryant (4), Batesville, Lamar, County Line, Parkdale
- 1990 – Hot Springs, Rivercrest, Star City, South Side BB, Kingsland
- 1989 – Bryant, Wynne, Gentry, South Side Bee Branch, Parkdale
- 1988 – Bryant, Batesville, Lamar, Flippin, Newark
- 1987 – FS Southside, Hamburg, Drew Central, Turrell, Huttig
- 1986 – FS Southside, Mountain Home, Mansfield, Mount Ida, Union
- 1985 – FS Southside, Searcy, Hamburg, Flippin, Newark
- 1984 – Blytheville, Wynne, McCrory, Flippin, Guy-Perkins
- 1983 – Marianna, Batesville, Clinton, Palestine, McNeil
- 1982 – Bryant, Batesville, Eudora, Palestine, McNeil
- 1981 – LR McClellan, Wynne, Altheimer, Waldo, Emerson
- 1980 – LR McClellan, Rivercrest, Clarksville, Palestine, Parkdale
- 1979 – Fayetteville, Alma, Vilonia, Waldo, Parkdale
- 1978 – Russellville, Rivercrest, Gurdon, Stephens, Plumerville
- 1977 – Lonoke, Stephens, McNeil
- 1976 – Alma, Stephens, Calico Rock
- 1975 – Stephens, Calico Rock
- 1974 – Rivercrest, Calico Rock
- 1973 – Highland, Melbourne
- 1972 – Stephens, Guy–Perkins
- 1971 – Prescott, Vilonia
- 1970 – Ashdown, Plumerville
- 1969 – Ashdown, Bradley
- 1968 – Ashdown, Bradley
- 1967 – Perryville, Bradley
- 1966 – Perryville, Bradley
- 1965 – Perryville, Glenwood
- 1964 – England, Lewisville
- 1963 – Leslie, Shawnee
- 1962 – Leslie, Bradley
- 1961 – England, Viola
- 1960 – Waldo, Greenbrier
- 1959 – England, Viola
- 1958 – Manila, Greenbrier
- 1957 – Ashdown, Greenbrier
- 1956 – Emerson, Greenbrier
- 1955 – Van Buren
- 1954 – Van Buren
- 1953 – Van Buren
- 1952 – Emerson
- 1951 – Van Buren
- 1950 – Van Buren
- 1949 – Marked Tree
- 1948 – Marked Tree
- 1947 – Marianna
- 1946 – Marked Tree

=== Past overall girls basketball champions ===
From 1972 to 1992, the Arkansas Activities Association organized an overall state championship tournament of the classification state champions.

- 1992 – Dardanelle
- 1991 – Bryant (4)
- 1990 – South Side Bee Branch
- 1989 – Bryant (3)
- 1988 – Bryant (2)
- 1987 – FS Southside (2)
- 1986 – FS Southside
- 1985 – Hamburg
- 1984 – Guy-Perkins
- 1983 – Batesville
- 1982 – Bryant
- 1981 – LR McClellan
- 1980 – Clarksville
- 1979 – Waldo
- 1978 – Stephens (4)
- 1977 – Stephens (3)
- 1976 – Calico Rock
- 1975 – Stephens (2)
- 1974 – Rivercrest
- 1973 - Melbourne
- 1972 – Stephens

=== Most girls basketball championships ===
- 9 - FS Northside
- 8 - Fayetteville, Greenwood
- 6 - Batesville, Bradley, Farmington, Greenland, Guy–Perkins, North Little Rock
- 5 - Bryant, England, FS Southside, Harrison, Little Rock Parkview, Melbourne, Stephens, Van Buren, Watson Chapel
- 4 - Calico Rock, Central Arkansas Christian, Hot Springs, Palestine–Wheatley, Parkdale, Rivercrest, Vilonia

== See also ==
- Arkansas Activities Association
- List of Arkansas state high school baseball champions
- List of Arkansas state high school football champions
- List of Arkansas state high school swimming champions
- List of Arkansas state high school tennis champions
- List of Arkansas state high school track and field champions
