= List of Arkansas state high school football champions =

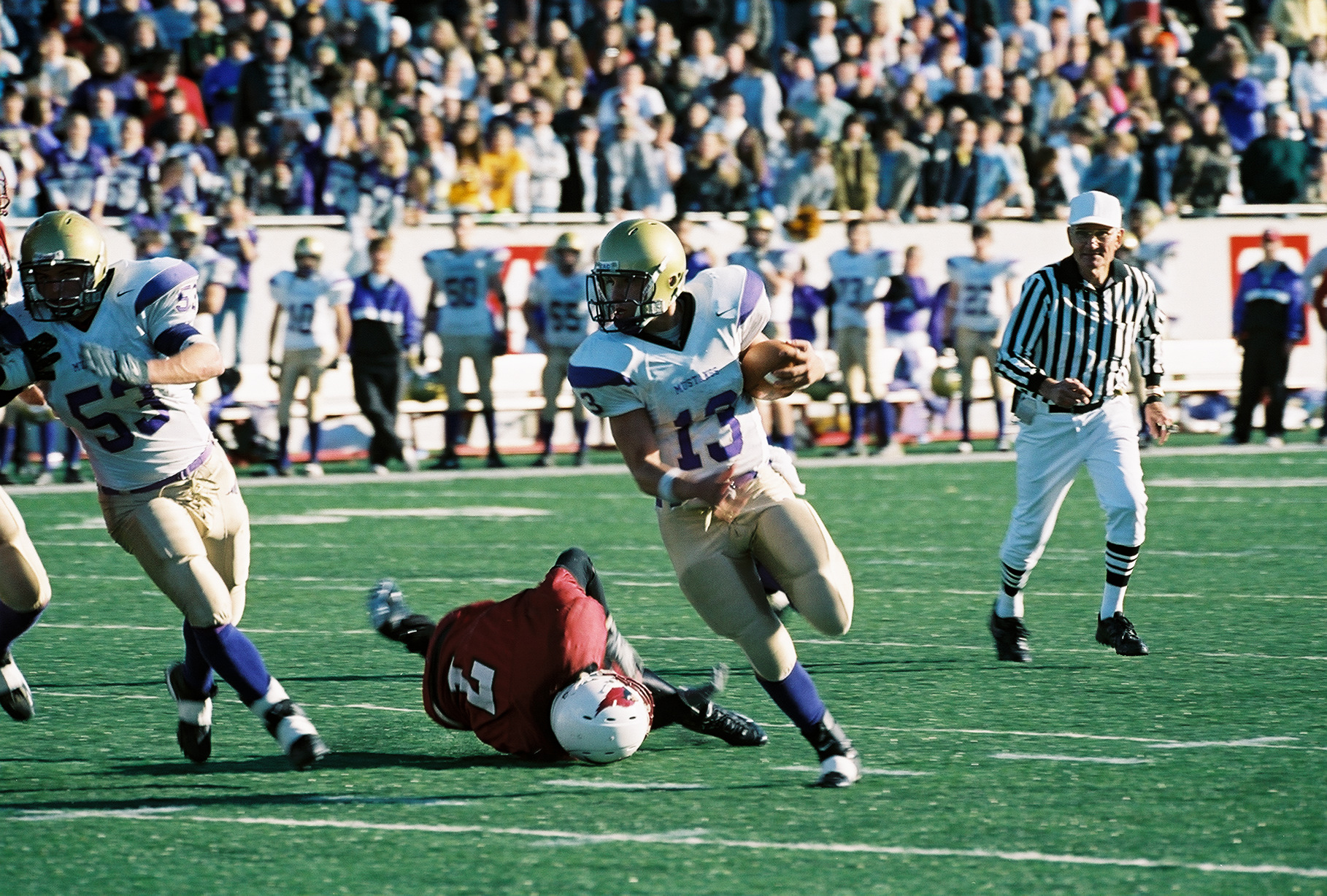
The 2004 Arkansas Class AAA football state championship game. The Central Arkansas Christian Mustangs defeated the Pine Bluff Dollarway Cardinals by a score of 34–20.

This is a list of the Arkansas state high school football champions which have been sanctioned by the Arkansas Activities Association (AAA).

== List of Arkansas state high school football champions ==
♦ Denotes winners of High School Football National Championship

Year	Class 7A	Class 6A	Class 5A	Class 4A	Class 3A	Class 2A	Eight-Man
2025	Bryant	Shiloh Christian	Joe T. Robinson	Elkins	Mansfield	Cross County	Cedar Ridge
2024	Bryant	Greenwood	Little Rock Parkview	Arkadelphia	Salem	Conway Christian	Strong
2023	Fayetteville	Greenwood	Little Rock Parkview	Harding Academy	Booneville	Bigelow	Rector
2022	Bryant	Pulaski Academy	Little Rock Parkview	Malvern	Charleston	Hazen	Izard County
2021	Bryant	El Dorado	Pulaski Academy	Joe T. Robinson	Harding Academy	McCrory	Strong

Year	Class 7A	Class 6A	Class 5A	Class 4A	Class 3A	Class 2A
2020	Bryant	Greenwood	Pulaski Academy	Shiloh Christian	Harding Academy	Fordyce
2019	Bryant	Searcy	Pulaski Academy	Joe T. Robinson	Harding Academy	Fordyce
2018	Bryant	Greenwood	Little Rock Christian Academy	Arkadelphia	Booneville	Junction City
2017	North Little Rock	Greenwood	Pulaski Academy	Arkadelphia	Rivercrest	Foreman
2016	Fayetteville	Russellville	Pulaski Academy	Warren	Prescott	Mt. Ida
2015	Fayetteville	Pine Bluff	Pulaski Academy	Nashville	Harding Academy	McCrory
2014	Bentonville	Pine Bluff	Pulaski Academy	Warren	Charleston	Junction City
2013	Bentonville	El Dorado	Morrilton	Booneville	Charleston	Junction City
2012	Fayetteville	Greenwood	Camden Fairview	Stuttgart	Harding Academy	Junction City
2011	Fayetteville	El Dorado	Greenwood	Pulaski Academy	Charleston	Strong
2010	Bentonville	El Dorado	Greenwood	Shiloh Christian	Rivercrest	Magazine
2009	Springdale Har-Ber	El Dorado	Monticello	Shiloh Christian	Fountain Lake	Junction City
2008	Bentonville	Lake Hamilton	Pulaski Academy	Shiloh Christian	Charleston	Junction City
2007	Fayetteville	Texarkana	Greenwood	Nashville	Glen Rose	Mt. Ida
2006	Fort Smith Southside	Texarkana	Greenwood	Nashville	Shiloh Christian	Jessieville
Year	Class AAAAA		Class AAAA	Class AAA	Class AA	
2005	Springdale		Greenwood	Nashville	Charleston	
2004	Little Rock Central		Wynne	Central Arkansas Christian	Rison	
2003	Little Rock Central		Batesville	Pulaski Academy	Junction City	
2002	Fort Smith Southside		Stuttgart	Warren	Harding Academy	
2001	Bentonville		Wynne	Warren	Shiloh Christian	
2000	Cabot		Greenwood	Booneville	Rison	
1999	Fort Smith Northside		Harrison	McGehee	Shiloh Christian	
1998	Little Rock Fair		Alma	McGehee	Shiloh Christian	
1997	Fort Smith Southside		Alma	Osceola	Barton	
1996	Van Buren		Pine Bluff Watson Chapel	Nashville	Bauxite	
1995	Pine Bluff		Osceola	Prescott	Rison	
1994	Pine Bluff		Monticello	Lonoke	Barton	
1993	Pine Bluff		Pine Bluff Dollarway	Malvern	Barton	
1992	Fort Smith Southside		Pine Bluff Dollarway	Lake Hamilton	Augusta	
1991	Fort Smith Southside		Newport	Fordyce	Rison	
1990	Pine Bluff		Pine Bluff Dollarway	Fordyce	Rison	
1989	Fort Smith Southside		Newport	McGehee	Barton	
1988	Fort Smith Northside		Newport	McGehee	Barton	
1987	Fort Smith Southside		Arkadelphia	McGehee	Barton	
1986	Little Rock Central		Wynne	Booneville	Barton	
1985	Little Rock Catholic		Rivercrest	Marvell	Horatio	
1984	Little Rock Catholic		Crossett	McGehee	Cross County	
1983	Fort Smith Southside		Cabot	Augusta	Harding Academy	
Year	Class AAAAA	Class AAAA	Class AAA	Class AA	Class A	
1982	Little Rock Central	Springdale	Stuttgart	Augusta	Rison	
1981	Little Rock Central	Jacksonville	Newport	Highland	Pine Bluff Jefferson Prep	
1980	Little Rock Central	Sylvan Hills	Alma	Pulaski Robinson	Danville	
1979	Little Rock Hall	Jonesboro	Arkadelphia	Pulaski Oak Grove	Mountain Pine	
1978	Little Rock Central	Jacksonville	Crossett	Barton	Mountain Pine	
1977	Little Rock Hall, Little Rock Parkview, Pine Bluff (Note: The Arkansas Activities Association lists three schools as 1977 Class AAAAA "tri-conference champion". According to the AAA, Class AAAAA held no football state championship tournament in 1977 (the other four classes did conduct playoffs), and AAA records note "Championship Game Site: None".) (Note: During the 1977 football regular season, Little Rock Hall defeated Pine Bluff by a score of 21–6; Little Rock Parkview defeated Little Rock Hall by a score of 13–12; and Pine Bluff defeated Little Rock Parkview by a score of 18–15.)	Benton	Van Buren	Parkin	Harding Academy	
Year	Class AAAA	Class AAA	Class AA	Class A	Class B	
1976	Little Rock Parkview	Jacksonville	Mena	Des Arc	Harding Academy	
1975	Little Rock Central	Texarkana	Stuttgart	Prescott	Dierks	
1974	Little Rock Parkview	Texarkana	Magnolia	Earle	Danville	
1973	Little Rock Parkview	Texarkana	Morrilton	Prescott	Farmington	
1972	North Little Rock	Hot Springs	Magnolia	Prescott	Farmington	
1971	Fort Smith Northside	Little Rock McClellan	Morrilton	Atkins	Danville	
1970	North Little Rock	Hot Springs	Stuttgart	Rison	Magnet Cove	
1969	Little Rock Hall	Springdale	Marianna Strong	McGehee	Murfreesboro	
1968	Fort Smith Northside	Springdale	Magnolia	Lonoke	Earle	

Starting in 1968, the Arkansas Activities Association organized playoffs to determine a state champion in each school size classification.

- 1967 – FS Northside (9), Conway (2)
- 1966 – LR Hall (3)-North Little Rock (2)-FS Northside (8)
- 1965 – North Little Rock
- 1964 – LR Hall (2), Conway
- 1963 – Pine Bluff (16)
- 1962 – Pine Bluff (15)
- 1961 – FS Northside (7)
- 1960 – LR Central (23), AP/UP media AA champion Stuttgart.
- 1959 – LR Hall
- 1958 – El Dorado (5)
- 1957 – LR Central (22) ♦ (12–0)
- 1956 – Little Rock (21)
- 1955 – Little Rock (20)
- 1954 – Little Rock (19)
- 1953 – Little Rock (18)
- 1952 – Little Rock (17)-Camden (2), Stuttgart (2), Earle
- 1951 – Pine Bluff (14)
- 1950 – Little Rock (16), Blytheville (7), Wynne, Rison
- 1949 – Little Rock (15), Smackover, Stuttgart, Lake Village (2)
- 1948 – Blytheville (6), Paragould, Lake Village
- 1947 – Little Rock (14), Magnolia, Dermott
- 1946 – Little Rock (13)♦ (14–0)
- 1945 – Fort Smith (6), Texarkana
- 1944 – Little Rock (12)
- 1943 – Pine Bluff (13)
- 1942 – El Dorado (4)
- 1941 – Blytheville (5)
- 1940 – Blytheville (4)
- 1939 – Pine Bluff (12) ♦ (11–0–1)
- 1938 – Little Rock (11)
- 1937 – Pine Bluff (11)
- 1936 – Blytheville (3)
- 1935 – Pine Bluff (10), Blytheville (2)
- 1934 – Hot Springs, Blytheville, De Queen
- 1933 – El Dorado (3), Russellville, Searcy
- 1932 – Pine Bluff (9), El Dorado (2), Fort Smith (5)
- 1931 – Fort Smith (4), Camden
- 1930 – Van Buren (2)
- 1929 – Pine Bluff (8)
- 1928 – Pine Bluff (7)
- 1927 – Pine Bluff (6)
- 1926 – Pine Bluff (5)
- 1925 – Pine Bluff (4)♦ (16–0)
- 1924 – El Dorado
- 1923 – Little Rock (4)
- 1922 – Pine Bluff (3)
- 1921 – Little Rock (10), Pine Bluff (2)
- 1920 – Little Rock (9)
- 1919 – Little Rock (8)
- 1918 – Little Rock (7)
- 1917 – Little Rock (6)
- 1916 – Pine Bluff
- 1915 – Little Rock (5)
- 1914 – Little Rock (4)
- 1913 – Fort Smith (3)
- 1912 – Van Buren
- 1911 – Fordyce Clary Training
- 1910 – Fort Smith (2)
- 1909 – Little Rock (3)
- 1908 – Little Rock (2)
- 1907 – Little Rock
- 1906 – Unknown
- 1905 – Fort Smith

=== Most state football championships ===
Team	Titles	Title Years (Fall)
Little Rock Central Tigers	31	1907–1909, 1914, 1915, 1917–1921, 1938, 1944, 1946, 1947, 1949, 1950, 1952–1957, 1960, 1975, 1978, 1980–1982, 1986, 2003, 2004
Pine Bluff Zebras	23	1916, 1921, 1922, 1925, 1926, 1927, 1928, 1929, 1932, 1935, 1937, 1939, 1943, 1951, 1962, 1963, 1973, 1990, 1993, 1994, 1995, 2014, 2015
Fort Smith Northside Grizzlies	14	1905, 1910, 1913, 1931, 1932, 1945, 1961, 1966, 1967, 1968, 1971, 1980, 1987, 1999
Greenwood Bulldogs	12	2000, 2005, 2006, 2007, 2010, 2011, 2012, 2017, 2018, 2020, 2023, 2024
Pulaski Academy Bruins	11	2003, 2008, 2011, 2014, 2015, 2016, 2017, 2019, 2020, 2021, 2022
El Dorado Wildcats	10	1924, 1932, 1933, 1942, 1958, 2009, 2010, 2011, 2013, 2021
Harding Academy Wildcats	10	1976, 1977, 1983, 2002, 2012, 2015, 2019, 2020, 2021, 2023
Shiloh Christian Saints	9	1998, 1999, 2001, 2006, 2008, 2009, 2010, 2020, 2025
Barton Bears	8	1978, 1986, 1987, 1988, 1989, 1993, 1994, 1997
Fort Smith Southside Rebels/Mavericks	8	1983, 1987, 1989, 1991, 1992, 1997, 2002, 2006
Rison Wildcats	8	1950, 1970, 1982, 1990, 1991,1995, 2000, 2004
Stuttgart Ricebirds	7	1949, 1952, 1970, 1975, 1982, 2002, 2012
Blytheville Chickasaws	7	1934, 1935, 1936, 1940, 1941, 1948, 1950
Junction City Dragons	7	2003, 2008, 2009, 2012, 2013, 2014, 2018
McGehee Owls	7	1969, 1984, 1987, 1988, 1989, 1998, 1999
Bryant Hornets	7	2018, 2019, 2020, 2021, 2022, 2024, 2025
Fayetteville Bulldogs	6	2007, 2011, 2012, 2015, 2016, 2023

== See also ==
- Arkansas Activities Association
- List of Arkansas state high school soccer champions
- List of Arkansas state high school basketball champions
- List of Arkansas state high school baseball champions
- List of Arkansas state high school swimming champions
- List of Arkansas state high school tennis champions
- List of Arkansas state high school track and field champions
