= North Little Rock High School =

School in North Little Rock, Arkansas, US

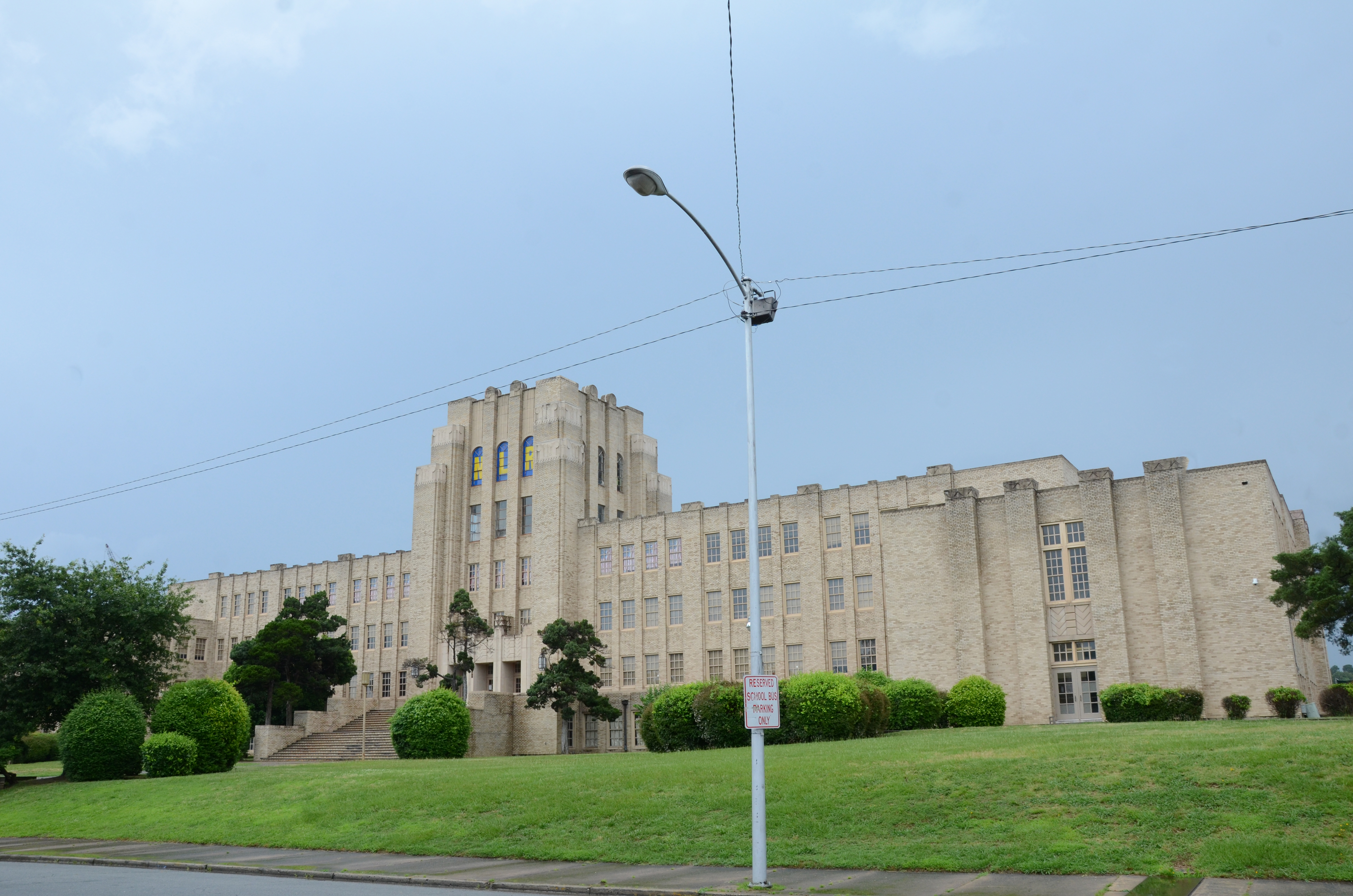

Location
- 101 West 22nd Street; North Little Rock, Arkansas 72114; United States

Information
- Established: 1928 (98 years ago)
- School district: North Little Rock School District
- NCES District ID: 0510680
- CEEB code: 041860
- NCES School ID: 051068000795 (West Campus); 051068000794 (East Campus)
- Principal: Dr. Nadia St. Louis
- Teaching staff: 143.34 (FTE)
- Enrollment: 1,680 (2023-2024)
- Student to teacher ratio: 11.72
- Campus: NLR High School
- Campus type: Urban
- Colors: Royal blue and gold
- Athletics conference: 7A Central
- Nickname: Ole Main
- Team name: Charging Wildcats
- Accreditation: AdvancED
- Newspaper: The Focus
- Yearbook: The Legacy
- Feeder schools: North Little Rock Middle School
- Affiliation: Arkansas Activities Association
- Website: www.nlrsd.org/o/high-school
- North Little Rock High School
- U.S. National Register of Historic Places
- Location within Arkansas Location within the United States
- Location: 101 West 22nd Street, North Little Rock, Arkansas
- Coordinates: 34°46′35″N 92°16′05″W
- Built: 1928-1930
- Architects: William Peterson, Mann, Wanger & King
- Architectural style: Art-Deco
- NRHP reference No.: 92001625
- Added to NRHP: February 25, 1993

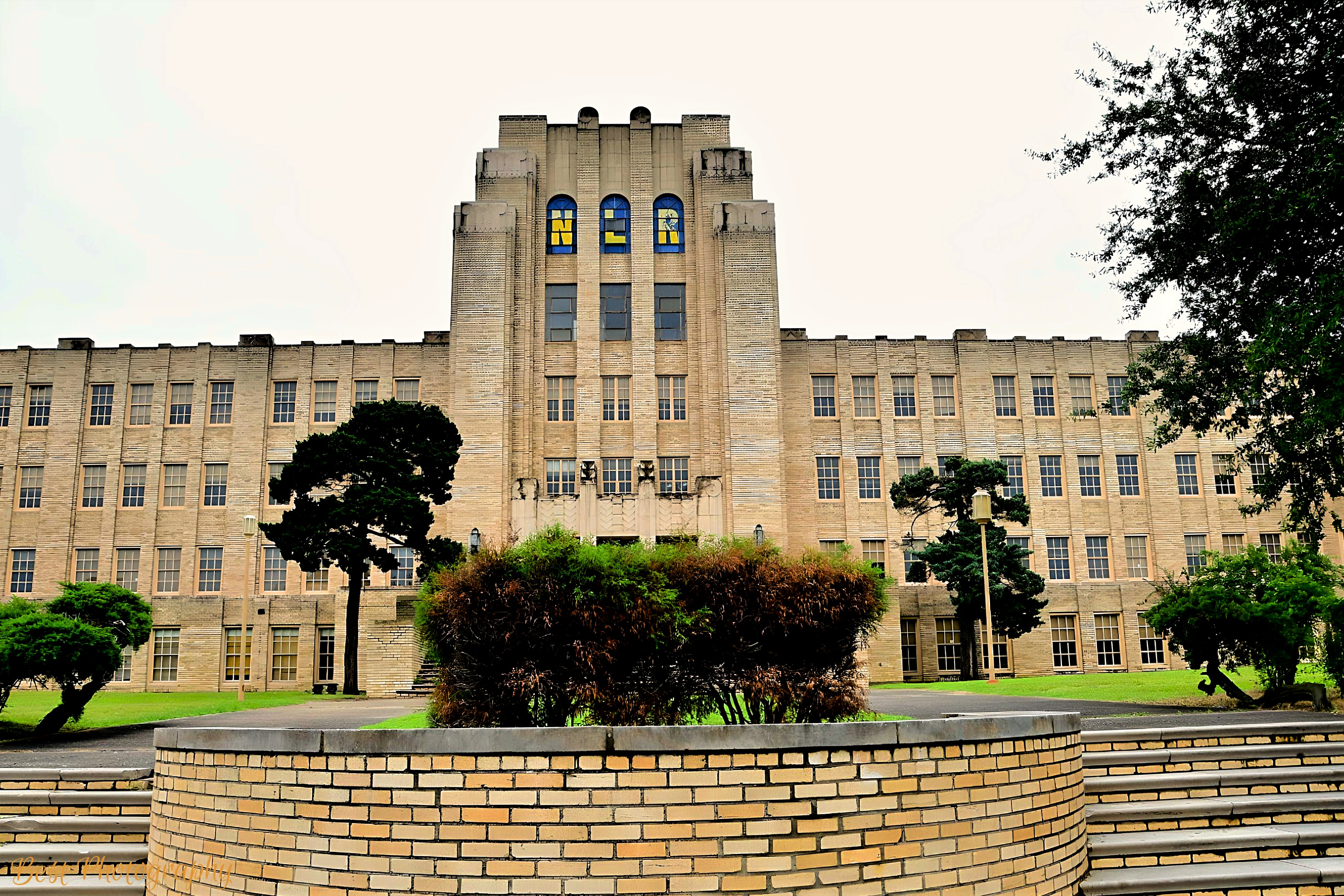
The main school building

North Little Rock High School is a public high school in North Little Rock, Arkansas, founded in 1928. The main school building, completed in the 1930s, is included on the U.S. National Register of Historic Places. As of 2024, the school had approximately 1,700 students enrolled.

== Governance ==
The school is administered by the North Little Rock School District.

== History ==
Built in 1928, North Little Rock's (Argenta's) first high school was called North Side High School, later Clendenin Hill High School (site of present-day Argenta Alternative Academy at 13th & Main Streets).

In 1912, the 16 classroom Argenta High School was constructed. In 1917 450 children attended the school. The rapid northward growth of North Little Rock in the mid-1920s resulted in a doubling of school enrollment. In 1928, as the need for a new high school increased, the North Little Rock School Board selected the corner of 22nd and Main Streets as the new construction site for North Little Rock High School. As a result, North Side High School became a junior high school. The original Argenta High School facility, which included an auditorium, a gymnasium, and a recitation room, stood until its 1976 demolition.

The North Little Rock High School was constructed beginning in 1928 and completed in 1930. Little Rock architect George R. Mann of the firm Peterson, William, Mann, Wanger & King designed the high school as a light colored brick and concrete building in an Art-Deco style. Between 1956 and 1959, North Little Rock High School served students in the 10th, 11th and 12th grade for nearby City of Sherwood before the construction of Sylvan Hills High School was completed.

In 1970, the North Little Rock School District closed Scipio Jones High School, the segregated public school for black children, as a result of desegregation and the city established a new integrated public high school and thus integrated and renamed the then 40-year-old classic art-deco facility along Main Street as Ole Main High School and named the new facility as Northeast High School. For the next twenty years, the Northeast Chargers served as a natural rival for the Ole Main Wildcats. Then in 1990, the school district consolidated the two schools as North Little Rock High School East Campus (formerly Northeast) for ninth and tenth grades and North Little Rock High School West Campus (formerly Ole Main) for eleventh and twelfth grades. As a result of the consolidation, the schools' new mascot became the Charging Wildcats as it remains today. In 1993, North Little Rock High School was listed on the National Register of Historic Places.

In 2012, the city of North Little Rock passed a millage to integrate the school into one campus for all high schoolers, grades 9-12. Construction for the new buildings and demolition of some old ones began the following school year. The district had to shuffle grades to different campuses to allow for it. The original High School still stands on the campus along with the new buildings. A new gym and football field were also constructed at this time.

== Curriculum ==
The school's assumed course of study is based on the Smart Core curriculum developed by the Arkansas Department of Education. The school offers coursework and exams in Advanced Placement (AP) and since 1992 offers the International Baccalaureate (IB) Diploma Programme. Additionally, the school is a member of the EAST (Environmental And Spatial Technologies) Initiative that allows students to familiarize themselves with technology through partnerships with technology firms.

The school's teachers received the 1982, 1990, and 1997 Arkansas Teacher of the Year awards by the state's education department and the 1979 and 1987 Bandmaster of the Year award by the Arkansas School Band and Orchestra Association.

== Sport and extracurricular activities ==
The school participate in a wide range of interscholastic sports and events from the 7A Classification—the state's largest classification—within the 7A Central Conference administered by the Arkansas Activities Association including: baseball, basketball, bowling, cheerleading, cross country, dance, debate, american football, golf, soccer, softball, speech, swimming, tennis, track, volleyball and wrestling.

=== Honors ===
- Boys' Basketball State Champions: 16*
  - 12—North Little Rock High School (1943 1949, 1964, 1967, 1969, 1971, 2013, 2014*, 2015, 2018, 2021, 2022)
  - 4—Scipio A. Jones High School (1956, 1957, 1958, 1959)
  - Girls' Basketball State Champions: 4 - 2006, 2010, 2016, 2018, 2022
- Football State Champions: 5–1965, 1966, 1970, 1972, 2017
- Girls' Fastptich Softball State Champions: 7–2001, 2002, 2008, 2009, 2013, 2014, 2015
- Girls' Tennis State Champions: 3–1988, 1989, 1990 (NLR East Campus, formerly North Little Rock Northeast)
- Baseball State Champions: 3—1996 (AAAA), 2004 (AAAAA), 2019 (7A)
- Boys' Soccer State Champions: 1—1998 ( 7th overall in the nation in AP Poll)

=== Awards and recognition ===
The girls' softball team from 2001 to 2003 hold a state record 41 consecutive wins with a state record of 34 wins during the 2002 season. Playing for Scipio A. Jones High School, Eddie Miles averaged 30.3 points per game during his senior year and led the Golden Dragons to four consecutive black school state championships. Between 1987 and 1990, Paula Juels won four consecutive individual state tennis championships (state record) while leading the North Little Rock Northeast Chargers to three team championships.

=== Theatre ===
The school has a large speech, drama and dance program; hosting three main stage productions, two dance concerts, a dessert theater night and one of the largest speech and debate competitions in central Arkansas. In 2016 representatives of the school were sent to compete at the National Forensics competition held in Salt Lake City and placed within the top 60 in the nation.

== Traditions ==
Senior Roll Night is an unofficial school tradition dating back to the 1980s that takes place each summer on the night before the first day of school. The senior class spends the night toilet papering the houses of the junior class. It is also common for toilets, mattresses, and other random objects to be spray painted with school colors and left on lawns.

== Awards and recognition ==
In 1988, the school's yearbook The Wildcat was inducted in the National Scholastic Press Association (NSPA) All-American Hall of Fame for its numerous National Pacemaker Awards it had received in previous years. In 2002, the school's literary magazine "Legend" grabbed a NSPA Best of Show Award.

== Notable alumni ==
=== Sport ===
- Glenn Abbott (1969) – professional baseball player (1973–1984)
- KeVaughn Allen (2015) – professional basketball player
- Terrell Allen (2020) – defensive lineman for the Tulane Green Wave
- K.J. Hill (2015) – Ohio State wide receiver, NFL receiver with the Los Angeles Chargers
- Trey Junkin (1980) – former football linebacker, tight end, and long snapper in NFL
- Eddie Miles (1959, NLR Scipio Jones) – retired basketball player who led Scipio A. Jones High School to four consecutive state championships; fourth overall pick of 1963 NBA draft
- Moses Moody (2020 - transferred) – professional basketball player for the Golden State Warriors
  Moses Moody
- Nick Smith Jr. (2022) – professional basketball player for Charlotte Hornets
- Martrell Spaight (2011) – professional football player (2015–2018)
- Bill Valentine (1950) – retired professional baseball umpire
- Will Walls – professional football player (1937–1943)
- Kel'el Ware (2022) – NBA player
- Wayne Yates (1956) – retired basketball player and coach
- Bill Young – professional football player (1937–1946)

=== Arts and media ===
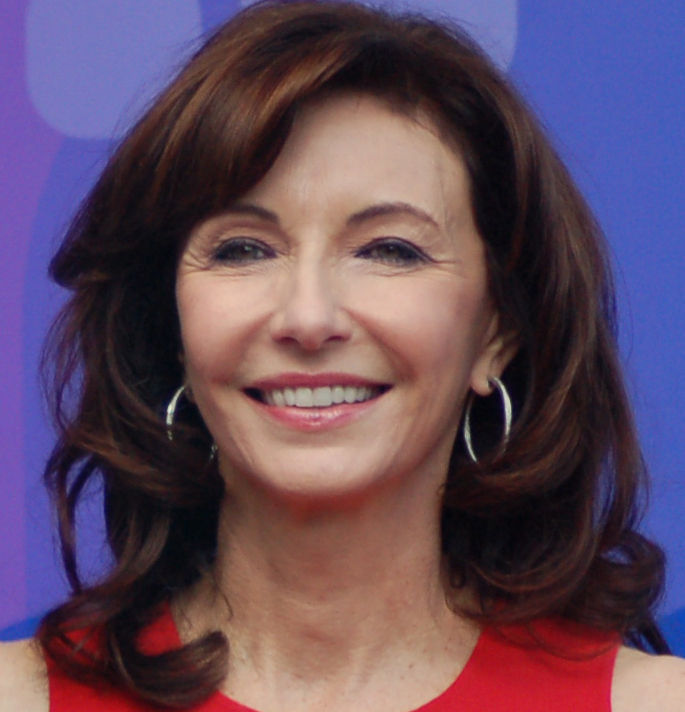
Mary Steenburgen

- Joey Lauren Adams (1986, NLR Northeast) – film and TV actress and director
- Nate Powell – graphic novelist, publisher, and musician.
- Jay Russell (1978) – director, producer, End of the Line (1988), My Dog Skip (2000), Tuck Everlasting (2002), Ladder 49 (2004), Water Horse: Legend of the Deep (2008)
- Pharoah Sanders (1959, NLR Scipio Jones) – jazz musician
- Mary Steenburgen (1971) – Academy Award-winning film actress

=== Politics ===
- Pat Hays – politician; former mayor of North Little Rock and Arkansas House of Representatives member

=== Other ===
- Jerry Jones (1960) – Dallas Cowboys owner, president and general manager

== Notable faculty ==
- Raymond Burnett (educator/coach, 1954–56) – football player and coach; inductee to Arkansas Sports Hall of Fame
- Henry Hawk, Head Football Coach; 1972 State Champion; Boston Marathoner; Arkansas Sports Hall of Fame
- Raymond Simon – former math teacher and U.S. Deputy Secretary of Education
- Ken Stephens (Educator/coach) – former coach who led this school to three state football championships ('65, '66, '70)
