= List of Arkansas state high school track and field champions =

The list of Arkansas state high school track and field champions is based on the annual winner of the team competition at the state track and field meet held annually each spring by the Arkansas Activities Association.

== List of Arkansas state high school boys track and field champions ==
Little Rock Central holds the national record for all-time most state championships in boys track and field with 50 titles won between 1908 and 1979.

- 2026 – Bentonville (7), Van Buren, Heber Springs (10), West Helena Central, Fordyce (5), Marked Tree
- 2025 – Bentonville (6), Mountain Home (2), Shiloh Christian, Ashdown (3), Fordyce (4), Founders Classical Academy (4)
- 2024 – Bentonville (5), Mountain Home, Magnolia (10), Prescott (15), Quitman (3), Founders Classical Academy (3)
- 2023 – Bentonville (4), Russellville (10), Magnolia (9), Prescott (14), Quitman (2), Ozark Catholic
- 2022 – Fayetteville (6), El Dorado, Pea Ridge (2), Prescott (13), Quitman, Founders Classical Academy (2)
- 2021 – Fayetteville (5), Texarkana (13), Pea Ridge, Prescott (12), Acorn (3), Founders Classical Academy
- 2019 – Fayetteville (4), Vilonia (5), Magnolia (8), Prescott (11), Earle (4), Trinity Christian (7)
- 2018 – Bentonville (3), Lake Hamilton (4), Vilonia (4), Crossett (24), Prescott (10), Earle (3), Trinity Christian (6)
- 2017 – Bentonville (2), Texarkana (12), De Queen (8), Heber Springs (9), Prescott (9), Caddo Hills (4), Trinity Christian (5)
- 2016 – Fayetteville (3), Texarkana (11), Forrest City (6), Heber Springs (8), Genoa Central (2), Lafayette County (2), Jacksonville Lighthouse
- 2015 – Bryant, Texarkana (10), Magnolia (7), Heber Springs (7), Prescott (8), Junction City (3), Caddo Hills (3)
- 2014 – Bentonville, Texarkana (9), Vilonia (3), Dollarway (2), Elkins, Junction City (2), Caddo Hills (2)
- 2013 – Rogers Heritage, Texarkana (8), Vilonia (2), Heber Springs (6), Episcopal Collegiate, Junction City, Caddo Hills
- 2012 – Fayetteville (2), Russellville (9), Vilonia, Heber Springs (5), Prescott (7), Magazine, Trinity Christian (4)
- 2011 – FS Southside, Russellville (8), Magnolia (6), Heber Springs (4), Rivercrest, Augusta, Trinity Christian (3)
- 2010 – FS Southside, Lake Hamilton (3), Magnolia (5), Nashville, Rivercrest, Augusta, Trinity Christian (2)
- 2009 – FS Southside, Lake Hamilton (2), Alma, De Queen (7), Prescott (6), Des Arc, Trinity Christian
- 2008 – Rogers (2), Lake Hamilton, Magnolia (4), De Queen (6), Prescott (5), Earle (2), Acorn (2)
- 2007 – Rogers, Forrest City (5), Magnolia (3), Nashville, Prescott (4), Mineral Springs, Acorn
- 2006 – Forrest City (4), Magnolia (2), Ashdown (2), Jessieville, Union Christian
- 2005 – Camden Fairview, Alma, De Queen (5), Jessieville, Emerson (18)
- 2004 – Fayetteville, Alma, De Queen (4), Lafayette County, Emerson (17)
- 2003 – Russellville (7), Crossett (23), De Queen (3), Stamps, Emerson (16)
- 2002 – Russellville (6), Crossett (22), Dardanelle, Mineral Springs, FS Christian (4)
- 2001 – Pine Bluff (16), Hot Springs, Nashville, tie: Barton-Clarendon, FS Christian (3)
- 2000 – Pine Bluff (15), Hot Springs, Nashville, Mineral Springs, FS Christian (2)
- 1999 – LR Fair, Hot Springs, Nashville, Mineral Springs, Emerson (15)
- 1998 – Pine Bluff (14), Crossett (21), Heber Springs (3), Mineral Springs, FS Christian
- 1997 – Pine Bluff (13), Arkadelphia, Heber Springs (2), Mineral Springs, Lockesburg
- 1996 – Texarkana (7), Sheridan, Stamps, Mineral Springs, Crowley's Ridge (3)
- 1995 – Camden Fairview, Sheridan, Stamps, Jessieville, Crowley's Ridge (2)
- 1994 – Texarkana (6), Crossett (20), Warren, Barton, Crowley's Ridge
- 1993 – Texarkana (5), Camden Fairview, Rivercrest, Mayflower, Emerson (14)
- 1992 – Conway (8), Camden Fairview, Prescott (3), Bearden, Emerson (13)
- 1991 – North Little Rock, Crossett (19), Heber Springs, Smackover, Emerson (12)
- 1990 – Pine Bluff (12), Dollarway, Lonoke, Foreman-Genoa Central, Emerson (11)
- 1989 – Conway (7), Crossett (18), Prescott (2), Hermitage, Emerson (10)
- 1988 – Pine Bluff (11), Crossett (17), McGehee, Augusta, Emerson (9)
- 1987 – Pine Bluff (10), Crossett (16), McGehee, Stamps, Emerson (8)
- 1986 – Pine Bluff (9), Crossett (15), Prescott, Bradley, Emerson (7)
- 1985 – Pine Bluff (8), Crossett (14), Earle, Bradley, Emerson (6)
- 1984 – West Memphis, Crossett (13) McCrory, Bradley, Emerson (5)
- 1983 – Pine Bluff (7), West Memphis, Crossett (12), Nashville, Cotton Plant (4), Kensett
- 1982 – Pine Bluff (6), Jacksonville, Camden (6), Nashville, Lewisville, Emerson (4)
- 1981 – Pine Bluff (5), Conway (6), Crossett (11), Dermott, Lewisville, Emerson (3)
- 1980 – FS Northside, Texarkana (4), Crossett (10), Luxora, Cotton Plant (3), Emerson (2)
- 1979 – LR Central (44), Texarkana (3), Crossett (9), England, Cotton Plant (2), Emerson
- 1978 – LR Hall (4), Texarkana (2), Crossett (8), Altheimer, Cotton Plant, Kensett
- 1977 – LR Hall (3), Forrest City (3), Crossett (7), Carlisle, Bradley
- 1976 – LR Central (43), Forrest City (2), Crossett (6), Smackover
- 1975 – tie: Pine Bluff (4)–LR Central (42), Forrest City, Crossett, Carlisle, Murfreesboro
- 1974 – Pine Bluff (3), West Memphis, Camden (5), Pulaski Robinson (4), Danville
- 1973 – LR Hall (2), West Memphis, Camden (4), Pulaski Robinson (3), Danville
- 1972 – LR Central (41), Hot Springs, Magnolia, Pulaski Robinson (2), Mineral Springs
- 1971 – Pine Bluff (2), Benton, Russellville (5), Pulaski Robinson, Gould
- 1970 – LR Central (40), Jacksonville, Russellville (4), Rison, Shawnee
- 1969 – FS Northside, Crossett (5), FS St. Annes, Foreman
- 1968 – LR Central (39), Crossett (4), De Queen (2), Stamps (4)
- 1967 – LR Central (38), Crossett (3), Fordyce (3), Stamps (3)
- 1966 – LR Hall, Russellville (3), Eudora, Stamps (2)
- 1965 – LR Central (37), Russellville (2), Brinkley (2), Stamps
- 1964 – LR Central (36), Benton (3), Brinkley, Harding Academy
- 1963 – LR Central (35), Conway (5), McGehee, Hughes (4)
- 1962 – LR Central (34), Benton (2), Searcy, Murfreesboro
- 1961 – LR Central (33), Benton, Ashdown, Hughes (3)
- 1960 – LR Central (32), Conway (4), Fordyce (2), Hughes (2)
- 1959 – Texarkana, Crossett (2), Fordyce, Hughes
- 1958 – LR Central (31), Crossett, De Queen, Atkins (6)
- 1957 – Little Rock (30), Conway (3), Lonoke, Clarendon (3)
- 1956 – Little Rock (29), Smackover (2), Helena, Clarendon (2)
- 1955 – Little Rock (28), Smackover, Clarendon
- 1954 – Little Rock (27), Conway (2), Atkins (5)
- 1953 – Little Rock (26), Conway, Dumas
- 1952 – Little Rock (25), Lake Village (3), Camden (4)
- 1951 – Little Rock (24), Russellville, Atkins (4)
- 1950 – Little Rock (23), Camden (3), Atkins (3)
- 1949 – Little Rock (22), Camden (2), Hartford
- 1948 – Camden, Atkins (2)
- 1947 – Little Rock (21), Atkins
- 1946 – Fort Smith, Bauxite (2)
- 1945 – Little Rock (20), Bauxite
- 1944 – No state meet World War II
- 1943 – No state meet World War II
- 1942 – Little Rock (19), Norphlet
- 1941 – Little Rock (18), Lonoke (5)
- 1940 – Little Rock (17), Lake Village (2)
- 1939 – Little Rock (16), Lake Village
- 1938 – Little Rock (15), Piggott (2)
- 1937 – Little Rock (14), Piggott
- 1936 – Little Rock (13), Lonoke (4)
- 1935 – Little Rock (12)
- 1934 – Little Rock (11)
- 1933 – Little Rock (10)
- 1932 – Little Rock (9)
- 1931 – Little Rock (8)
- 1930 – Little Rock (7)
- 1929 – Little Rock (6)
- 1928 – Little Rock (5)
- 1927 – Little Rock (4)
- 1926 – Little Rock (3)
- 1925 – Pine Bluff
- 1924 – Lonoke (3)
- 1923 – Lonoke (2)
- 1922 – Little Rock (2)
- 1921 – Little Rock
- 1920 – Lonoke

== List of Arkansas state high school girls track and field champions ==
The following is a list of the girls track and field state champion schools with the number of titles in parentheses:

- 2026 – Bentonville (14), Vilonia (2), Magnolia (5), Providence (2), Quitman (3), Mineral Springs
- 2025 – Bentonville (13), El Dorado (3), Warren (4), Providence, Quitman (2), Magazine (2)
- 2024 – Bentonville (12), Lake Hamilton (6), Harding Academy (11), tie – Prescott (3) / Mountain View (3), Yellsville-Summit (4), Ozark Catholic
- 2023 – Bentonville (11), El Dorado (2), Warren (3), Mountain View (2), Yellsville-Summit (3), Kingston (3)
- 2022 – Fayetteville (8), El Dorado, Valley View, Harding Academy (10), Yellsville-Summit (2), Kingston (2)
- 2021 – Bentonville (10), Vilonia, Pea Ridge (3), Harding Academy (9), Yellsville-Summit, Kingston
- 2019 – Bentonville (9), Sylvan Hills (5), Pea Ridge (2), Harding Academy (8), Melbourne, Alpena
- 2018 – Bentonville (8), Lake Hamilton (5), Sylvan Hills (4), Pea Ridge, Prescott (2), Foreman (4), Decatur (2)
- 2017 – Fayetteville (7), Lake Hamilton (4), Sylvan Hills (3), Pocahontas (4), Genoa Central (4), Quitman, Decatur
- 2016 – Fayetteville (6), Texarkana (8), Magnolia (4), Ashdown (2), Genoa Central (3), Magnet Cove, Trinity Christian (7)
- 2015 – Bentonville (7), Lake Hamilton (3), Magnolia (3), Ashdown, Genoa Central (2), Des Arc (3), Trinity Christian (6)
- 2014 – Bentonville (6), Texarkana (7), Magnolia (2), Crossett (8), Mansfield (5), Magazine, Trinity Christian (5)
- 2013 – Bentonville (5), LR Parkview (2), Camden Fairview (8), Crossett (7), Harding Academy (7), Murfreesboro (3), Trinity Christian (4)
- 2012 – Bentonville (4), Texarkana (6), tie – Crossett (6)-Camden Fairview (7), Nashville (10), Harding Academy (6), Des Arc (2), Acorn (2)
- 2011 – Fayetteville (5), Lake Hamilton (2), Camden Fairview (6), Nashville (9), Harding Academy (5), Murfreesboro (2), Acorn
- 2010 – Fayetteville (4), Texarkana (5), Camden Fairview (5), Nashville (8), Mansfield (4), Murfreesboro, Trinity Christian (3)
- 2009 – Bentonville (3), Texarkana (4), Batesville (5), Nashville (7), Mansfield (3), Westside JC (2), Trinity Christian (2)
- 2008 – Bentonville (2), Texarkana (3), Batesville (4), Nashville (6), Mansfield (2), Des Arc, Trinity Christian
- 2007 – Bentonville, Lake Hamilton, Batesville (3), Nashville (5), Mansfield, Westside JC, Guy–Perkins
- 2006 – Camden Fairview (4), Batesville (2), Lafayette County (3), Genoa Central, Union Christian
- 2005 – Camden Fairview (3), Batesville, Lafayette County (2), Harding Academy (4), Delaplaine (5)
- 2004 – LR McClellan (2), Sylvan Hills (2), De Queen, Lafayette County, Delaplaine (4)
- 2003 _ Jonesboro, Sylvan Hills, Nashville (4), Harding Academy (3), Delaplaine (3)
- 2002 – Pine Bluff (6), Watson Chapel (5), Mena, tie – Harding Academy (2)-Rison (7), Delaplaine (2)
- 2001 – Pine Bluff (5), Watson Chapel (4), Nashville (3), Harding Academy, Delaplaine
- 2000 – Fayetteville (3), Crossett (5), Nashville (2), tie – Jessieville-Shiloh Christian (5), Emerson (7)
- 1999 – Fayetteville (2), Watson Chapel (3), Nashville, Shiloh Christian (4), Emerson (6)
- 1998 – Camden Fairview (2), Watson Chapel (2), Beebe (2), Shiloh Christian (3), Emerson (5)
- 1997 – Texarkana (2), Crossett (4), Mountain View, Shiloh Christian (2), St. Joseph (2)
- 1996 – Texarkana, Watson Chapel, Pocahontas (3), Shiloh Christian, St. Joseph
- 1995 – FS Southside (10), Sheridan (2), Pocahontas (2), Barton, FS Christian (3)
- 1994 – FS Southside (9), Sheridan, Warren (2), Foreman (3), FS Christian (2)
- 1993 – FS Southside (8), Camden Fairview, Lake Village, Foreman (2), FS Christian
- 1992 – FS Southside (7), Magnolia, Warren, Nevada (2), Emerson (4)
- 1991 – FS Southside (6), Crossett (3), Nevada, Caddo Hills (2), Scranton (4)
- 1990 – FS Southside (5), Crossett (2), Dardanelle (2), Caddo Hills, Scranton (3)
- 1989 – Conway (4), Batesville, Dardanelle, Foreman, Emerson (3)
- 1988 – Conway (3), Crossett, Star City (2), Hermitage, Saratoga (3)
- 1987 – Conway (2), Wynne (2), Star City, Rison (6), Emerson (2)
- 1986 – Conway, Wynne, Fordyce (2), Rison (5), Saratoga (2)
- 1985 – FS Southside (4), Alma (3), Prescott, Rison (4), Saratoga
- 1984 – Pine Bluff (4), Malvern (2), Fordyce, Lewisville (3), Scranton (2)
- 1983 – Pine Bluff (3), FS Southside (3), Malvern, Marvell, Lewisville (2), Shirley
- 1982 – Pine Bluff (2), FS Southside (2), Greenwood, Augusta, Lewisville, tie-Pocahontas, St. Paul
- 1981 – Pine Bluff, FS Southside, HS Lakeside (2), DeWitt, Rison (3), Oil Trough
- 1980 – LR Central (2), Blytheville (3), HS Lakeside, McCrory, Rison (2), Emerson
- 1979 – LR Central, LR McClellan, Arkadelphia, Hoxie, Rison, Scranton
- 1978 – LR Parkview, Blytheville (2), Alma (2), Waldron (2), Mountain Pine, Kensett (2)
- 1977 – NLR Ole Main, Blytheville, Alma, Stamps, Kensett
- 1976 – Fayetteville, Beebe
- 1975 – LR Hall
- 1974 – Waldron

=== Most state girls track and field championships ===
Team	Titles	Title Years (Spring)
Bentonville	14	2007, 2008, 2009, 2012, 2013, 2014, 2015, 2018, 2019, 2021, 2023, 2024, 2025, 2026
Harding Academy	11	2001, 2002, 2003, 2005, 2011, 2012, 2013, 2019, 2021, 2022, 2024
Fort Smith Southside	10	1981, 1982, 1983, 1985, 1990, 1991, 1992, 1993, 1994, 1995
Nashville	10	1999, 2000, 2001, 2003, 2007, 2008, 2009, 2010, 2011, 2012
Camden Fairview	8	1993, 1998, 2005, 2006, 2010, 2011, 2012, 2013

== See also ==
- Arkansas Activities Association
- List of Arkansas state high school football champions
- List of Arkansas state high school basketball champions
- List of Arkansas state high school baseball champions
- List of Arkansas state high school soccer champions
- List of Arkansas state high school swimming champions
- List of Arkansas state high school tennis champions
