= Shiloh Christian School =

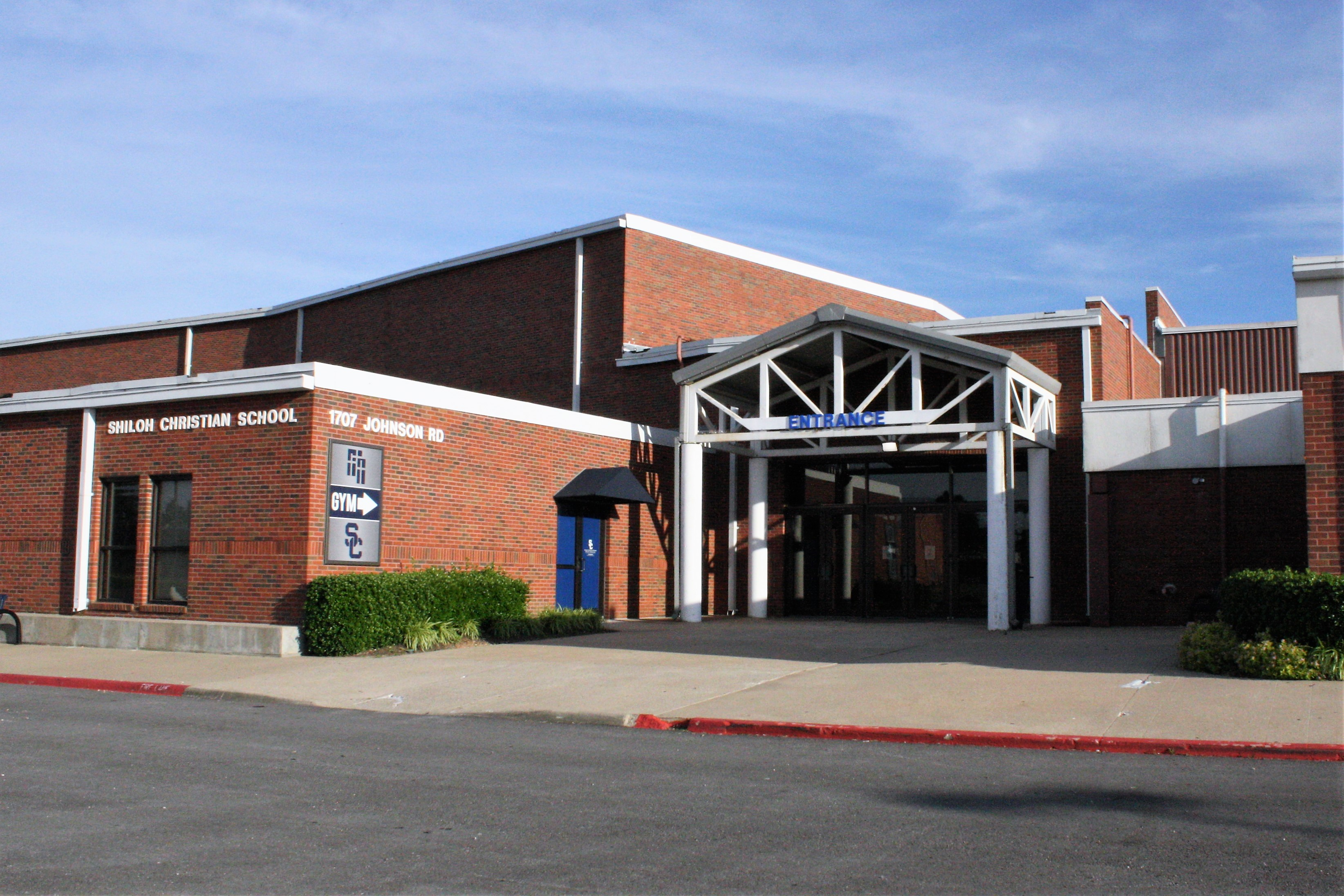

Location
- 1707 Johnson Road; Springdale, Arkansas 72762; United States; 36°10′7″N 94°9′18″W

Information
- School type: Private
- Denomination: Baptist
- Established: 1976 (50 years ago)
- CEEB code: 042313
- NCES School ID: 02004615
- Teaching staff: 65.0 (on FTE basis
- Grades: PK–12
- Gender: Coeducational
- Enrollment: 1500 (2022-23)
- Student to teacher ratio: 11.4
- Campus size: 72-acre (29 ha)
- Colors: Navy blue and Vegas Gold
- Athletics: Football, volleyball, cross country, golf, cheer, basketball, soccer, baseball, softball, tennis, track
- Athletics conference: 6A West (2024-2026)
- Nickname: Saint
- Team name: Shiloh Christian Saints
- Website: www.shilohsaints.org

Shiloh Christian School is a private Baptist Christian school in Springdale, Arkansas, United States.

== History ==
Shiloh Christian School was founded in 1976 as a ministry of the First Baptist Church of Springdale, by Dennis Cottrell and Tom Ellis, under the leadership of Pastor Cliff Palmer. The school opened with 0 students from kindergarten through sixth grade. A new grade was added each year. The school graduated its first high school class in 1983, with twelve students. In 1979, the First Baptist Church of Springdale moved from its downtown location to its present 72-acre site on Johnson Road.

Shiloh Christian School is accredited by the Arkansas Non-Public School Accreditation Association, the Association of Christian Schools International, and AdvancED since 2003.

== Campus ==
The campus includes a 2,900 seat worship center, a 300-seat chapel, a 1,400 seat basketball facility, and a football stadium.

== Extracurricular activities ==
The Shiloh Christian School mascot for academic and athletic teams is the Saints with navy and gold.

=== Athletics ===
For 2024-2026, the Shiloh Saints compete in the 6A Classification from the 6A West Conference as administered by the Arkansas Activities Association. The Saints high school teams consist of football, volleyball, golf (boys/girls), cross country (boys/girls), cheer, basketball (boys/girls), wrestling, soccer (girls), baseball, softball, tennis (boys/girls), and track and field (boys/girls).

The Shiloh Christian High School teams have won more than 25 state championships.

- Football: The Saints football team are one of the school's most successful programs with ten state football championship trophies raised since 1998 with titles in 1998, 1999, 2001, 2006, 2008, 2009, 2010, 2020, 2021, and 2025. They will be moving up to class 7A in the 2026 season due to their success. In April 2011, PBS's series Frontline ran a single episode primarily focusing on Shiloh Christian's football team. The episode, titled "Football High", was given the tagline "High school football has never had a higher profile …. but is winning worth the risks?"
- Golf: The boys golf team has won state golf championships in 1996, 2014 and 2016.
- Cross country: The girls cross country team is a 5-time state cross country champion with titles in 1994, 1995, 1997, 1998 and 2009. The boys squad are 2-time state cross country champions with titles in 2007 and 2009.
- Tennis: The boys tennis team are 4-time state tennis champions with titles in 2000, 2001, 2009, and 2014. The girls tennis team won three consecutive state tennis championships and four overall with wins in 1996, 1997, 1998 and 2000.
- Baseball: The baseball squad won three consecutive state baseball championships in 2010, 2011 and 2012. They were district champions in 2025, and placed third in the state championship. They repeated this in 2026, winning the district championship and placing third in the state tournament. They’ll be moving up to class 5A in 2027 due to their success.
- Track and field: The girls track team won five consecutive state track and field championships in 1996, 1997, 1998, 1999 and 2000.
- Women's Soccer: The girls soccer team has won one soccer state championship during the 2013 soccer season.

== Notable alumni ==
- Jim Bob Duggar (1983)—former Arkansas State Legislator and current father in TLC's reality television series 19 Kids and Counting.
- Kiehl Frazier (2010)—2010 USA Today National Player of the Year; Auburn University quarterback.
- Rhett Lashlee (2001)—former Arkansas Razorbacks QB, Auburn and Miami offensive coordinator, and current head coach of SMU Football.
- Gus Malzahn (Coach, 1996–2000)—UCF head football coach; coached Shiloh to 1998 and 1999 state titles; created the play "Little Rock" at Shiloh which would later become "The Prayer at Jordan–Hare" on November 16, 2013 at Auburn.
- Colby Fulfer, Chief of Staff to Springdale Mayor Doug Sprouse and former Arkansas State Senator from Springdale (February 2022 – January 2023)
