= List of Arkansas state high school tennis champions =

The list of Arkansas State High School Tennis Champions is based on the annual winner of the team competition at the state tennis tournament held by the Arkansas Activities Association each fall.

== List of Arkansas State High School Boys Tennis Champions ==
The following is a list of Arkansas state team champions in boys tennis each fall of the school year:

- 2024 – Rogers (7A/6A), Mountain Home (5A), Monticello (4A), Haas Hall Fayetteville (3A), Riverside (2A)
- 2023 – Jonesboro and Bentonville Tie (7A/6A), Pulaski Academy (5A), Shiloh Christian (4A), Haas Hall Fayetteville (3A), Parkers Chapel, Riverside and Conway Christian Tie (2A)
- 2022 – Fayetteville (7A/6A), Hot Springs Lakeside (5A), Shiloh Christian (4A), Drew Central (3A), Riverside (2A)
- 2021 – Fayetteville (7A/6A), Jonesboro (5A), Pulaski Academy (4A), Episcopal Collegiate (3A), Parkers Chapel (2A)
- 2020 – Rogers (7A/6A), Jonesboro (5A), Pulaski Academy (4A), Episcopal Collegiate (3A), Haas Hall Academy Bentonville (2A)
- 2019 – LR Catholic (7A/6A), Jonesboro (5A), Pulaski Academy (4A), Episcopal Collegiate (3A), Haas Hall Academy Bentonville (2A)
- 2018 – LR Catholic (7A/6A), Jonesboro (5A), Pulaski Academy (4A), Episcopal Collegiate (3A), Haas Hall Academy Bentonville (2A)
- 2017 – LR Catholic (7A), Jonesboro (6A), Pulaski Academy (5A), Pottsville (4A), Episcopal Collegiate (3A), Haas Hall Academy Bentonville (2A)
- 2016 – LR Catholic (7A), Greenwood (6A), Pulaski Academy (5A), Pottsville (4A), Episcopal Collegiate (3A), Parkers Chapel (2A)
- 2015 – LR Catholic (7A), Jonesboro (6A), Pulaski Academy (5A), Shiloh Christian (4A), Episcopal Collegiate (3A), Riverside (2A)
- 2014 – Bentonville and LR Central Tie (7A), Jonesboro (6A), Hot Springs Lakeside (5A), Shiloh Christian (4A), Episcopal Collegiate (3A), Riverside (2A)
- 2013 – Bentonville (7A), Jonesboro (6A), Hot Springs Lakeside (5A), Arkansas Baptist (4A), Episcopal Collegiate (3A), Riverside (2A)
- 2012 – Bentonville (7A), Jonesboro (6A), Pulaski Academy (5A), Valley View (4A), Piggott (3A), Conway Christian (2A)
- 2011 – Bentonville, Jonesboro, HS Lakeside, Pulaski Academy, Episcopal Collegiate, Ridgefield Christian
- 2010 – Bentonville, Jonesboro, Central Arkansas Christian, Pulaski Academy, Episcopal Collegiate, Union Christian
- 2009 – LR Central, Jonesboro, HS Lakeside, Shiloh Christian, Episcopal Collegiate, Union Christian
- 2008 – LR Central, Jonesboro, HS Lakeside, Subiaco Academy, Episcopal Collegiate, Union Christian
- 2007 – LR Central, Mountain Home, Pulaski Academy, Valley View/Union Christian, LR Episcopal Collegiate, Acorn
- 2006 – LR Central, Texarkana, HS Lakeside, Fountain Lake, East Poinsett County, Crowley’s Ridge
- 2005 – LR Central, tie-HS Lakeside-Alma, tie-Valley View-Pulaski Academy-Central Arkansas Christian, LR Episcopal Collegiate
- 2004 – LR Central, HS Lakeside, Pulaski Academy, LR Episcopal Collegiate
- 2003 – (Fall) LR Central, HS Lakeside, Pulaski Academy, LR Episcopal Collegiate
- 2003 – LR Central, HS Lakeside, Pulaski Academy, LR Lutheran
- 2002 – LR Central, Nettleton, Pulaski Academy, Shirley
- 2001 – LR Central, HS Lakeside, Subiaco Academy, Shiloh Christian
- 2000 – LR Central, HS Lakeside, Subiaco Academy, Shiloh Christian
- 1999 – LR Catholic, HS Lakeside, Subiaco Academy, Arkansas Baptist
- 1998 – LR Fair, HS Lakeside, Central Arkansas Christian, Arkansas Baptist
- 1997 – tie-Bentonville-Russellville, HS Lakeside, Valley View, Arkansas Baptist
- 1996 – LR Central, HS Lakeside, Booneville, tie-Shirley-Ark School Math & Science
- 1995 – FS Southside, HS Lakeside, Booneville, Jessieville
- 1994 – FS Southside, Searcy, Fountain Lake, Jessieville
- 1993 – FS Southside, tie-Arkadelphia-Searcy, Subiaco Academy, Jessieville
- 1992 – LR Catholic, Searcy. Jessieville
- 1991 – LR Catholic, HS Lakeside, Jessieville
- 1990 – Fayetteville, tie-HS Lakeside-Harrison, Subiaco Academy
- 1989 – Fayetteville, Harrison, Subiaco Academy
- 1988 – tie-LR Hall-LR Mills, HS Lakeside, Subiaco Academy
- 1987 – LR Catholic, HS Lakeside, McGehee
- 1986 – LR Catholic, Searcy, Harding Academy
- 1985 – LR Catholic, tie-Nettleton-McGehee, Dardanelle
- 1984 – Fayetteville, Magnolia, Harding Academy
- 1983 – Pine Bluff, LR Catholic, Magnolia, Pulaski Academy, Fountain Lake
- 1982 – LR Central, FS Southside, tie-Magnolia-Batesville, tie-Fountain Lake, Central Arkansas
- 1981 – LR Catholic, tie-Fayetteville-FS Southside, HS Lakeside, Pulaski Academy
- 1980 – LR Catholic, FS Southside, HS Lakeside, McGehee
- 1979 – NA
- 1978 – NA
- 1977 – NA
- 1976 – LR Catholic, Fayetteville, Siloam Springs, Gurdon
- 1975 – LR Catholic, FS Southside, Magnolia, Parkin
- 1974 – LR Catholic, FS Southside, Bentonville, tie-Prescott-Gurdon Clarksville
- 1973 – LR Catholic, Fayetteville, Bryant, Gurdon
- 1972 – Pine Bluff, Fayetteville, Bryant, Harding Academy
- 1971 – Pine Bluff, LR Catholic, Fordyce, FS St. Annes
- 1970 – Fayetteville, LR Parkview, McGehee
- 1969 – LR Hall, Paragould, FS St. Annes
- 1968 – LR Hall, LR Catholic, tie-Fordyce-McGehee

== List of Arkansas state high school girls tennis champions ==
The following is a list of Arkansas state champions in girls tennis:

- 2024 – Bentonville (7A/6A), Valley View (5A), Robinson (4A), Elkins and Thaden Tie (3A), Riverside (2A)
- 2023 – Bentonville and Rogers Heritage Tie (7A/6A), Pulaski Academy (5A), Episcopal Collegiate (4A), Haas Hall Fayetteville (3A), Parkers Chapel (2A)
- 2022 – Bentonville (7A/6A), Pulaski Academy (5A), Episcopal Collegiate (4A), Haas Hall Fayetteville (3A), Parkers Chapel (2A)
- 2021 – Bentonville West (7A/6A), Jonesboro (5A), Pulaski Academy (4A), Haas Hall Fayetteville (3A), Parkers Chapel (2A)
- 2020 – Bentonville (7A/6A), Jonesboro (5A), Pulaski Academy (4A), Cave City (3A), Parkers Chapel (2A)
- 2019 – Bentonville West (7A/6A), Jonesboro (5A), Pulaski Academy (4A), Episcopal Collegiate (3A), Haas Hall Fayetteville (2A)
- 2018 – Fayetteville (7A/6A), Jonesboro (5A), Valley View (4A), Episcopal Collegiate (3A), Riverside (2A)
- 2017 – Fayetteville (7A), Jonesboro (6A), Pulaski Academy (5A), Pottsville (4A), Episcopal Collegiate (3A), Haas Hall Academy Bentonville (2A)
- 2016 – Bentonville (7A), Mountain Home (6A), HS Lakeside (5A), Southside and Pocahontas Tie (4A), Episcopal Collegiate (3A), Haas Hall Academy Bentonville (2A)
- 2015 – Bentonville (7A), Jonesboro (6A), HS Lakeside and Pulaski Academy Tie (5A), Brookland (4A), Episcopal Collegiate (3A), Union Christian (2A)
- 2014 – Bentonville (7A), Lake Hamilton (6A), HS Lakeside (5A), Highland (4A), Episcopal Collegiate (3A), Parkers Chapel (2A)
- 2013 – Rogers (7A), Lake Hamilton (6A), HS Lakeside (5A), Valley View (4A), Episcopal Collegiate (3A), Parkers Chapel (2A)
- 2012 – Rogers (7A), Lake Hamilton (6A), HS Lakeside (5A), Nashville (4A), Episcopal Collegiate (3A), Riverside (2A)
- 2011 – LR Central, Jonesboro, HS Lakeside, Valley View, Episcopal Collegiate, Riverside
- 2010 – LR Central, Jonesboro, HS Lakeside, Pulaski Academy (12), Episcopal Collegiate, Riverside
- 2009 – Bentonville, Jonesboro, HS Lakeside, Arkadelphia, Episcopal Collegiate, Union Christian
- 2008 – Mount St. Mary (9), Jonesboro, Greenwood, Jonesboro Westside, Episcopal Collegiate, Riverside
- 2007 – Bentonville, Jonesboro, HS Lakeside, Jonesboro Westside, Bismarck, Parkers Chapel
- 2006 – Bentonville, Jonesboro, HS Lakeside, Highland, Bergman, Parkers Chapel
- 2005 – Bentonville, Siloam Springs, Pulaski Academy (11), Bergman
- 2004 – LR Central, Greenwood, Pulaski Academy (10), Bergman
- 2003 – (Fall) FS Southside, HS Lakeside, Pulaski Academy (9), LR Christian
- 2003 – LR Central, HS Lakeside, Fountain Lake, tie, Jessieville-PB St. Joseph
- 2002 – Mount St. Mary (8), HS Lakeside, Cave City, PB St. Joseph
- 2001 – LR Central, HS Lakeside, Valley View, PB St. Joseph
- 2000 – Mount St. Mary (7), HS Lakeside, tie-Drew Central-Valley View, Shiloh Christian
- 1999 – Mount St. Mary (6), tie-HS Lakeside-Hot Springs, Fountain Lake, Jessieville
- 1998 – Mount St. Mary (5), HS Lakeside, Fountain Lake, Shiloh Christian
- 1997 – Jonesboro, HS Lakeside, tie-Fountain Lake-Paris, Shiloh Christian
- 1996 – FS Southside, HS Lakeside, Highland, tie-Shiloh Christian-Mulberry
- 1995 – Jonesboro, HS Lakeside, tie-Brinkley-Atkins, East Poinsett County
- 1994 – Bentonville, HS Lakeside, Pulaski Academy (8), tie-Hampton-Pottsville
- 1993 – Bentonville, tie-Hot Springs-Crossett, tie-Warren-Atkins, East Poinsett County
- 1992 – North Little Rock, tie-Searcy-Batesville, Pulaski Academy (7)
- 1991 – North Little Rock, tie-Searcy-Crossett, Pulaski Academy (6)
- 1990 – NLR Northeast, HS Lakeside, Highland
- 1989 – NLR Northeast, HS Lakeside, Pulaski Academy (5)
- 1988 – NLR Northeast, HS Lakeside, Pulaski Academy (4)
- 1987 – FS Southside, tie-HS Lakeside-Cabot, tie-Pulaski Academy (3)-Highland-Shirley
- 1986 – tie-LR McClellan-Texarkana, Crossett, Fountain Lake
- 1985 – tie-LR McClellan-Texarkana, Crossett, Fountain Lake (3)
- 1984 – LR Mount St. Mary (4), Crossett, Fountain Lake (2)
- 1983 – LR Hall, Jonesboro, Batesville (4), Fountain Lake
- 1982 – LR Central (2), tie-Fayetteville-Jonesboro, Batesville (3), Fountain Lake
- 1981 – tie-LR Central-FS Northside, LR Mount St. Mary (3), Batesville (2), Pulaski Academy (2)
- 1980 – Pine Bluff (4), LR Mount St. Mary (2), Batesville, Pulaski Academy
- 1979 – Pine Bluff (3), Texarkana
- 1978 – NA
- 1977 – NA
- 1976 – Pine Bluff (2), Earle
- 1975 – LR Mount St. Mary
- 1974 – LR Parkview
- 1973 – LR Hall (3)
- 1972 – LR Hall (2)
- 1971 – tie-LR Hall-Pine Bluff

== See also ==
- Arkansas Activities Association
- List of Arkansas state high school football champions
- List of Arkansas state high school basketball champions
- List of Arkansas state high school baseball champions
- List of Arkansas state high school soccer champions
- List of Arkansas state high school swimming champions
- List of Arkansas state high school track and field champions
