= Fort Smith School District =

School district in Arkansas

Location
- 3205 Jenny Lind Drive; Fort Smith, Arkansas 72901-1948 United States

District information
- Type: Public
- Motto: Believe. Belong. Become.
- Grades: Prekindergarten (PK) – 12
- Superintendent: Martin Mahan
- Accreditation: Arkansas Department of Education
- Schools: 26
- NCES District ID: 0506330

Students and staff
- Students: 14,045
- Teachers: 997.97 (on FTE basis)
- Staff: 2,401.04 (on FTE basis)
- Athletic conference: 7A West

Other information
- Website: www.fortsmithschools.org

The Fort Smith School District (or Fort Smith Public Schools) is the major public school district based in Fort Smith, Arkansas, United States.

The system consists of 26 schools that provide early childhood, elementary and secondary education to students in pre-kindergarten through grade 12 and serves the following Sebastian County communities: the majority of Fort Smith and the western portion of Barling.

== History ==
The district enacted a mask mandate during the COVID-19 pandemic in Arkansas. The district continued it beyond the anticipated end date of October 2021 into at least November.

== Schools ==
=== Secondary schools ===
High/Secondary Schools

- Northside High School (9–12)
- Southside High School (9–12)

Junior High Schools

- Dora Kimmons Middle School (6–8)
- L. A. Chaffin Middle School (6–8)
- Ramsey Middle School (6–8)
- William O. Darby Middle School (6–8)

=== Elementary/Primary Schools ===
- Ballman Elementary School (K–5)
- Barling Elementary School (PK–5)
- Beard Elementary School (PK–5)
- Bonneville Elementary School (PK–5)
- Cavanaugh Elementary School (K–5)
- Elmer H. Cook Elementary School (K–5)
- Euper Lane Elementary School (K–5)
- Fairview Elementary School (PK–5)
- Harry C. Morrison Elementary School (PK–5)
- Howard Elementary School (PK–5)
- John P. Woods Elementary School (K–5)
- Park Elementary School (K–5)
- Sunnymede Elementary School (K–5)
- Sutton Elementary School (K–5)
- Tilles Elementary School (PK–5)

=== Special Schools & Programs ===
- Belle Point Alternative Center (7–12)
- Peak Innovation Center (11-12)
- Fort Smith Adult Education Center
- Fort Smith Virtual Academy

== See also ==
- List of school districts in Arkansas
