= Bay High School (Arkansas) =

Public high school in Arkansas, United States

Location
- 700 School Street; Bay, Arkansas 72411; United States
- Coordinates: 35°44′49″N 90°33′55″W

Information
- School type: Public comprehensive
- Established: 1897 (129 years ago)
- Status: Open
- School district: Bay School District
- CEEB code: 040130
- NCES School ID: 050282000051
- Teaching staff: 31.87 (on FTE basis)
- Grades: 7–12
- Enrollment: 229 (2023–2024)
- Student to teacher ratio: 7.19
- Education system: ADE Smart Core
- Classes offered: Regular, Advanced Placement (AP)
- Colors: Purple and gold
- Athletics conference: 2A Region 3 East (2024–2026)
- Mascot: Yellowjacket
- Team name: Bay Yellowjackets
- Accreditation: ADE; AdvancED (1997–)
- Affiliation: Arkansas Activities Association
- Website: www.bay.k12.ar.us

Bay High School is an accredited comprehensive public high school located in Bay, Arkansas, United States. The school provides secondary education for students in grades 7 through 12. It is one of six public high schools in Craighead County, Arkansas and the sole high school administered by the Bay School District.

== Academics ==
Bay High School is a Title I school that is accredited by the ADE and has been accredited by AdvancED since 1997.

Annually, the College of Agriculture & Technology (COAT) at Arkansas State University (ASU) administers the Mr. & Mrs. W. W. Holmes Memorial Scholarship for an incoming freshman majoring in agriculture with preference to students from Bay, Arkansas.

== Athletics ==
The Bay High School mascot is the Yellowjacket, with purple and gold serving as the school colors.

The Bay Yellowjackets compete in interscholastic activities within the 1A Classification, the state's smallest classification, and within the 1A Region 3 East Conference administered by the Arkansas Activities Association. The Yellowjackets field junior varsity and varsity teams in golf (boys/girls), volleyball, basketball (boys/girls), track and field (boys/girls), baseball, and softball, along with cheer and dance.

The Bay Yellowjackets have enjoyed success on the basketball court and baseball field:

- Basketball: The Yellowjackets boys' basketball team is a three-time state basketball champion (1965, 2011, 2013).

== Notable alumni ==
- Wally Moon - MLB Player (STL, LAD) Baseball Manager in later career
