= Northside High School (Fort Smith, Arkansas) =

Location
- 2301 North B Street; Fort Smith, Arkansas 72901; United States; 35°22′42″N 94°24′30″W

Information
- Former name: Fort Smith High School
- Type: Public
- Motto: It’s great to be a Grizzly Bear
- Established: 1928 (98 years ago)
- Superintendent: Martin Mahan
- CEEB code: 040835
- NCES School ID: 050633000367
- Principal: Marshal Hurst
- Teaching staff: 198.73 (on FTE basis)
- Grades: 9-12
- Enrollment: 2,231 (2024-2025)
- Student to teacher ratio: 11.23
- Campus type: Urban
- Colors: Red and white
- Athletics conference: 7A Central
- Mascot: Grizzly bear (named Bob)
- Nickname: Grizzlies
- Team name: Northside Grizzlies
- Alumni: Northside Alumni
- Website: northside.fortsmithschools.org

Northside High School (formerly known as Fort Smith High School) is one of two public high schools in the city of Fort Smith, Arkansas (the other being Southside High School), both of which are administered by the Fort Smith School District. Within the state, the school is commonly known as Fort Smith Northside.

== History ==
The original Fort Smith High School completed construction in fall 1897 and was described as one of the "Seven Wonders of Fort Smith" with its English castle-style, buff-brick and grey-stone building until a deadly tornado nearly destroyed the building three months later, in January 11, 1898. Also in Fort Smith, Howard High School (1888) and Lincoln High School (1892), both black schools, ran until 1966.

On November 19, 1928, Fort Smith High School moved into a new building on 23rd and B Street in Fort Smith, Arkansas. The population of Fort Smith at the time was 31,400. The new building was dedicated on February 15, 1929, just before the mid-term class graduation could take place. The first year, 848 students enrolled in the high school (it could accommodate 3,000 students). With the new large building, many local organizations, as well as nationally known groups and individuals used the 1,060-seat auditorium for performances and other events. The auditorium has been visited by such famous people as Helen Olheim, opera singer with the Metropolitan Opera (1937–38); Carl Sandburg, poet, biographer and entertainer (1939–40); Margaret Bourke-White, war correspondent, photographer, author (1943–44); Nancy Gean, FSHS graduate and fashion analyst for Butterick (1947–48); Nelson Bennett, world-famous model for painters and sculptors (1965–66); and Shawntel Smith, Miss America (1995–96).

In 1934, the Fort Smith High School yearbook, Sounder, changed its name to Bruin. During its formative years, the senior class of 1937 hired Harry Alford of Chicago to write the Fort Smith High School Alma Mater, which has remained the same until today for now Northside High School.

In 1956, the school built an annex. The following year, enrollment for students was up to 1,738, which made Fort Smith High School the largest high school in Arkansas. During the school year of 1960-61, the Farnsworth Rose Garden was completed on the campus. Fort Smith High School was officially renamed Northside High School in 1963. Shortly thereafter, the Field House was opened and a marquee was installed in front of the campus in 1964. When Lincoln High School closed, Northside's enrollment continued to grow.

Improvements were made continually for the next several years. First, Grizzly Stadium was renamed Mayo-Thompson Stadium. The campus continued to grow with the addition of the Fine Arts building, learning lab, and elevator during the 1980-81 school year. The Rogers Book Store was purchased to house computer labs and kept its original name, the Schlenker Building. In 2003-04, the original gym was renovated with a new finished floor, a film room, and new custom oak lockers. The original floor, possibly the only one of its kind, required special efforts to be able to reseal and finish it. The girls basketball team has been one of the strongest teams in the state for several years, winning four straight titles between 1999-2002.

== Academics ==
Northside High School is accredited by the Arkansas Department of Education (ADE) and has been an accredited charter member of AdvancED (formerly North Central Association) since 1924. The assumed course of study follows the ADE Smart Core curriculum that requires at least 22 units to graduate. Students complete regular (core and career focus) courses and exams and may select Advanced Placement (AP) coursework and exams that provide an opportunity to receive college credit prior to high school graduation. In 2023, 34% of students at Northside High School were enrolled in an AP course. 18% of the student body passed at least one of the AP exams.

=== Enrollment ===
The enrollment for the 2003-04 school year was 1,284 with a diverse group of students, the enrollment for the 2004-05 school year was 1,350, the enrollment for the 2005-06 school year was 1,383, and the enrollment for the 2007-08 school year was 1,404. The approximate breakdown is as follows: 12 percent Asian, 21 percent African American, 18 percent Hispanic, 2 percent American Indian, and 46 percent Caucasian enrolled. Thirty-five percent of the student population is eligible for free lunch which is less than the 46 percent average for Arkansas.

=== Awards and recognition ===
In 1992-93, Northside High School was selected as a National Blue Ribbon School of Excellence by the U.S. Department of Education (ED).

The Northside Quiz Bowl team won the American Scholastics Competition Network national championship in 1993 and 2001, as well as multiple Arkansas state championships during the 1990s and 2000s.

== Athletics ==
Football field picture looking up at the press box.

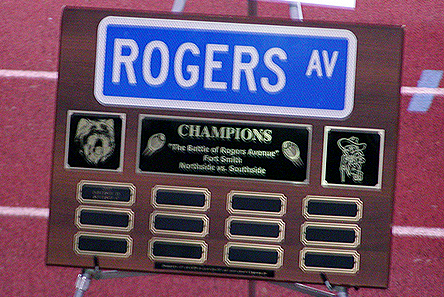
Battle of Rogers Avenue Plaque from yearly rivalry game against Southside High School

The Northside Grizzlies participate in the 7A Classification from the 7A/6A Central Conference as administered by the Arkansas Activities Association. The Grizzlies compete in football, volleyball, golf (boys/girls), cross country, bowling (boys/girls), basketball (boys/girls), wrestling, swimming (boys/girls), soccer (boys/girls), tennis (boys/girls), and track and field (boys/girls).

The Fort Smith Northside Grizzlies have won various athletic classification state championships, including:

- (8x) state football champion: 1961, 1966, 1967, 1968, 1971, 1980, 1987, 1999
- (2x) state boys golf champion: 1971, 1977
- (11x) state boys basketball champion: 1925, 1951, 1955, 1958, 1959, 1965, 1968, 1974, 2007, 2017, 2019
- (9x) state girls basketball champion: (1999, 2000, 2001, 2002, 2007, 2013, 2019, 2021, 2025)
- (1x) state girls tennis champion: 1981
- (2x) state boys track champion: 1969, 1980
- (2x) State boys soccer champion: 2013, 2015 runner up, 2018, 2022 runner up

The gymnasium hosted the majority of home games for the Arkansas Fantastics of the American Basketball Association.

== Notable alumni ==
- Jennifer Billingsley - Actress.
- John Boozman - Member of Congress, Arkansas's 3rd congressional district (2001–11), current Senator representing Arkansas; two-time University of Arkansas football letterman.
- Charles Winchester Breedlove, Los Angeles City Council member, 1933–45
- Ron Brewer - 7th pick of the 1978 NBA draft by the Portland Trail Blazers. At Northside, he was on the basketball team that won a state championship. On the University of Arkansas basketball team, he was a member of Eddie Sutton's "Triplet's" that led the team to the Final four in 1978.
- Kodi Burns (2007) - American football collegiate coach.
- Ravin Caldwell - linebacker for the Washington Redskins.
- Brett Goode - former long snapper for the Green Bay Packers.
- Mark Hutson - college All-American and football assistant coach for the Oakland Raiders.
- Isaiah Joe - shooting guard for the Oklahoma City Thunder.
- Matt Jones - 2005 1st round NFL draft; he spent his senior year at Fort Smith Northside. He played quarterback at the University of Arkansas and led its football team to victories in the two longest overtime games in NCAA football history.
- Tre Norwood - cornerback for the Pittsburgh Steelers.
- Kiondre Thomas - player for the Green Bay Packers
- Jaylin Williams - power forward for the Oklahoma City Thunder
- Gary Wisener - safety for the Dallas Cowboys.
