= Bay School District =

School district in Arkansas, United States

Address
- 700 School Street Bay, Arkansas, 72411; United States

District information
- Type: Public
- Grades: K–12
- Schools: 2
- NCES District ID: 0502820

Students and staff
- Students: 592
- Teachers: 42.61
- Staff: 43.5
- Student–teacher ratio: 13.89
- District mascot: Yellowjacket

Other information
- Website: www.bay.k12.ar.us

Bay School District is a public school district based in Craighead County, Arkansas, United States, with its headquarters in Bay. According to the official website, the Bay School District, located in northeastern Arkansas, was established in 1897. The district has an area of over 65 square miles, bordering Brookland, Riverside, Nettleton, and Valley View School Districts in Craighead County, and Trumann School District in Poinsett County. The Bay School District includes Bay Elementary School (K–6) and Bay High School (7–12), and the district has been NCA accredited since 1990.

In addition to Bay, the district includes portions of the city limits of Jonesboro.
