= EStem Public Charter Schools =

School district in Arkansas

eStem Public Charter Schools Inc. is a non-profit charter school management organization in Arkansas. eStem established eStem Elementary Public Charter School, eStem Middle Public Charter School, and eStem High Public Charter School in downtown Little Rock under a five-year charter granted by the Arkansas State Board of Education in December 2007. All three schools are open enrollment, publicly financed schools, meaning any school-aged child in Arkansas is eligible to attend. As public schools, the eStem public charter schools are tuition free.

As of 2026 the high school has an AP African American Studies class. The Arkansas Department of Education, effective 2023, no longer counted the class towards having credit towards a high school diploma in the state. The high school decided to keep offering the class and offered medals to students who pass the course.

On February 4, 2026, about 140 students walked out during school hours to protest ICE following the January killings of Renée Good and Alex Pretti. Also that day, students at Little Rock Central High School protested during a fire drill. The protests were part of a larger series of demonstrations across the United States.

== Extracurricular activities ==
The schools' mascot and athletic symbol is the Mets. The eStem Public Charter High School is a member of the Arkansas Activities Association.

In 2014, the eStem High School Lady Mets girls basketball team won the Class 3A state basketball title, which is the school's first sports championship.

In 2025, the eStem Mets QuizBowl team won the Arkansas Governor's Quiz Bowl Association 5A State Tournament.
