= Harding Academy (Searcy, Arkansas) =

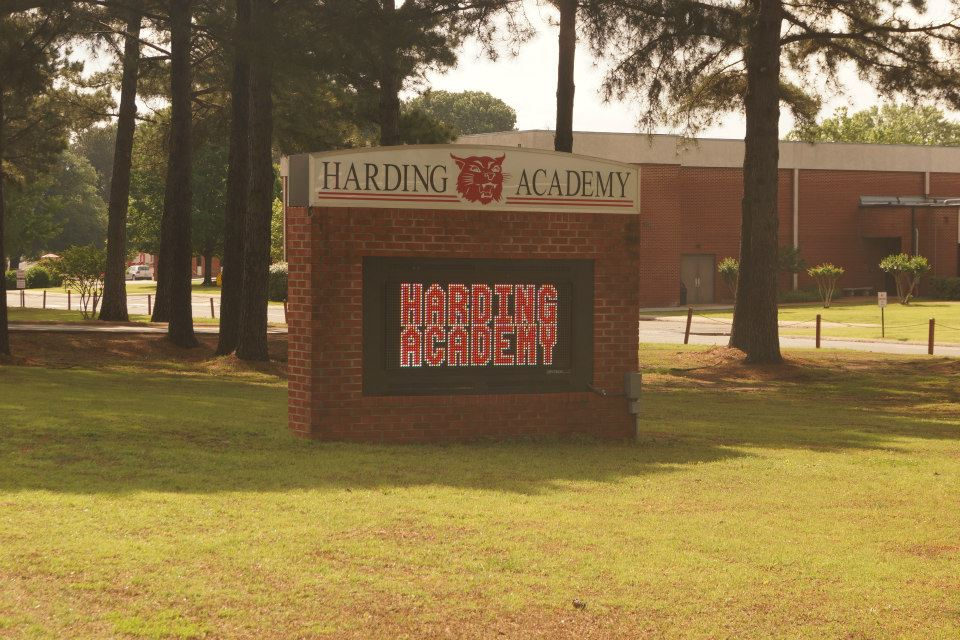

Location
- 1529 East Park Avenue; Searcy, Arkansas 72143; United States; 35°14′46″N 91°43′12″W

Information
- Type: Private
- Motto: "High Quality Academic Education in a Christian Environment."
- Established: 1924 (102 years ago)
- Headmaster: James Gurchiek
- Staff: 61
- Grades: K-12
- Enrollment: 687
- Colors: Red and white
- Athletics conference: Class 5A East (2024-2026) www.ahsaa.org/football-conferences
- Nickname: Wildcats
- Affiliations: Church of Christ, Harding University
- Website: hardingwildcats.com

Harding Academy is a K-12 private school in Searcy, Arkansas. It is affiliated with Harding University, its parent institution, and both are associated with the Churches of Christ, and named in honor of minister James A. Harding.

== Student life ==
Harding Academy is accredited by the National Christian School Association. Many students take Advanced Placement (AP) courses and successfully gain college credit while still enrolled in high school.

The FIRST LEGO League (Mindsweepers) team won the state championship in 2017 and 2021. The FIRST Robotics Competition team (Team 3937 Breakaway) won the 2014 Arkansas Regional and Louisiana Bayou Regional as well as the 2015 and 2017 Louisiana Bayou Regional.

Every school day the students and faculty meet for chapel followed by a 45-minute bible study period that all students grades 7-12 attend. The school also participates in various community events including hosting the Wildcat Road Mile, Micah Rine 5k, and the Breakaway 10k.

== Athletics ==
Harding Academy's mascot is the Wildcats, and the school colors are red and white.

The Harding Academy Wildcats participate in the 3A Classification and 3A Region 2 Conference as sanctioned by the Arkansas Activities Association. Boys may participate in these sports:

- Football: Harding Academy football has won 10 state championships in divisions from B to 4A over the course of almost 50 years: 1976, '77, '83, '02, '12, '15, and three in a row (2019-2021), and a 4A championship in 2023. football state championship
- Basketball: The boys basketball team won the 3A classification state basketball championship in 2013 and 2021.
- Tennis: The boys tennis teams have won three state championships (1974, 1984, 1986).
- Baseball: After just a few seasons the baseball team won the Arkansas AAA State Championship in 2008, the first time the school has won a state title in baseball (Bagley). They then followed with more championships in 2013, 2017, and 2018. The baseball team also won the state championship in 2021, 2022, and 2023.
- Soccer: The boys soccer team won their first state championship in 2022.

Girls may participate in these sports:

- Volleyball: The volleyball team won a state volleyball championship in 2011.
- Track: The girls' team has twice won three consecutive state championships in 2001, 2002, & 2003, and again in 2011, 2012, & 2013. They also won in '05, '19, '21, & '22. The boys team also won the state championship in 1964. List of Arkansas state high school track and field champions
- Cross country running: The girls cross country teams are 5-time state cross country champions (2000, 2001, 2002, 2004, 2011).
- Tennis: state doubles winner and overall state runners-up in 2012
- Softball:
- Golf The boys' team won the state championship in 2013.
- Cheerleading
- Soccer: The girls soccer team won the state championship in 2021, 2022, and 2023.

== Academics ==
Harding Academy offers AP and Honors classes. The school requires all students (grades 7–12) to attend daily Bible classes.

== Notable alumni ==
- Michael Blue, investor
- Stephen Mark Brown, vocalist
- Jeb Huckeba, professional football player
