= Baptist Preparatory School =

The Baptist Preparatory School

Location
- 62 Pleasant Valley Dr. Little Rock, Arkansas 72212; United States; 34°46′45″N 92°24′5″W

Information
- Type: Private Secondary
- Established: 1981
- Status: Open
- CEEB code: 041414
- NCES School ID: A0790011
- Head of school: Dr. Greg Jones
- Grades: Pre K-12
- Enrollment: 567
- Colors: Red; White; Navy Blue
- Mascot: Eagle
- Team name: Baptist Prep Eagles
- Affiliations: ANSAA, AAA
- Website: baptistprep.org

The Baptist Preparatory School (or Baptist Prep) is a private, independent college preparatory, preschool, elementary, and junior/senior high school Christian school in Little Rock, Arkansas, United States. Founded in 1981, The Baptist Preparatory School via its Lower School and Upper School provide Christian-based education to more than 830 students annually in kindergarten through grade 12.

== History ==
It was formerly known as Arkansas Baptist Schools, with the high school component being Arkansas Baptist High School.

== Composition ==
The Baptist Preparatory School serves as the private school that consists of the two campuses:

- Lower School - serves as the elementary school (prekindergarten through grade 5).
- Upper School - serves as the secondary school (grades 6 through 12).

The Baptist Preparatory School is accredited by the Arkansas Nonpublic School Accreditation Association (ANSAA) and by the Association of Christian Schools International (ACSI).

== Academics ==
Students complete regular courses and exams and may select Advanced Placement (AP) coursework and exams that provide an opportunity for college credit. Concurrent college credit courses are offered through John Brown University. Students must complete 26 credits (22 credits + 4 credits Bible) to graduate from Baptist Prep, which equates to the Arkansas Department of Education requirement of 22 credits for public school students. Three types of diplomas are offered: the Standard Diploma (26 credits), the College Preparatory Diploma (27 credits), and the Student of Distinction Diploma (28 credits).

== Extracurricular activities ==
The Baptist Preparatory School mascot and athletic emblem is the Eagle with navy blue, white, and red serving as the school colors.

=== Music ===
Baptist Prep has a full band and choral music program for grades 5-12.

=== Athletics ===
Baptist Prep plays in the 3A Classification administered by the Arkansas Activities Association. The school participates in football, golf (boys'/girls'), cross country, basketball (boys'/girls'), cheer, dance, soccer (boys'/girls'), baseball, softball, swimming and diving (boys'/girls'), tennis (boys'/girls'), volleyball, and track and field (boys'/girls'). Baptist Prep supports after school programs in archery and trap shooting. The trap shooting team participates in the Arkansas Youth Shooting Sports Program, Amateur Trapshooting Association’s Academics, Integrity, and Marksmanship (AIM) Program, and the Scholastic Clay Trap Program.

The Baptist Prep Eagles have won numerous state championships:

- Boys' Golf (9): 2005, 2006, 2007, 2008, 2010, 2013, 2018, 2019, 2020
- Girls' Golf (4): 2008, 2014, 2016, 2017
- Boys' Tennis (4): 1997, 1998, 1999, 2013
- Boys' Basketball (6): 1997, 1999, 2009, 2016, 2017, 2018
- Baseball: 1999
- Girls Softball 2021

=== Clubs and traditions ===
The Baptist Preparatory School students participate in a variety of clubs and organizations including National Beta Club, Chapel Praise Team, Eagle Forum, Fellowship of Christian Athletes (FCA), Future Business Leaders of America, International Club, Mu Alpha Theta (math honor society), National Honor Society (NHS), Quiz Bowl, and Student Council and Drama Club.

== Notable alumni ==
- David Hodges - Class of 1997
