= Scipio Jones High School =

Scipio A. Jones High School

Location
- Coordinates: 34.761823°N 92.2561245°W

Information
- Former name: Argenta Colored School (1909–1911); Hickory Street High School (1911–1928)
- Founded: 1909
- Closed: 1970

Scipio A. Jones High School was a public high school for black students in North Little Rock, Arkansas. It was named after Scipio Africanus Jones.

== History ==
It originated as the Argenta Colored School, which began operations in 1909. Around 1911 it became the Hickory Street High School. The school developed into a full K-12 school by 1917, and it received its final name in 1928.

In 1958-1959 the Little Rock School District temporarily closed all of its schools, but Scipio Jones was only able to accept a few black students who were locked out of their previous schools; the school district required that any student wishing to transfer to have an address in North Little Rock at the time.

Scipio Jones High closed in 1970. Students were redirected to North Little Rock High School.

As of 1998 the gymnasium is the only structure left standing as the main school building was destroyed in a fire shortly after its closure.
