= List of Arkansas state high school swimming champions =

The list of Arkansas state high school swimming champions is based on the annual winner of the team competition at the state swimming tournament held by the Arkansas Activities Association.

== List of Arkansas state high school boys swimming and diving champions ==
The following is a list of Arkansas state champions in boys swimming & diving:

- 2025 – Bentonville (22), Batesville (5), Robinson
- 2024 – Bentonville (21), Batesville (4), Clarksville
- 2023 – Bentonville (20), Batesville (3), Magnolia (7)
- 2022 – LR Central (8), Batesville (2), Magnolia (6)
- 2021 – Bentonville (19), Russellville (2), Magnolia (5)
- 2020 – Conway (2), Russellville, Batesville
- 2019 – LR Central (7), LR Christian, Magnolia (4)
- 2018 – LR Central (6), Valley View (2)
- 2017 – Bentonville (18), Valley View
- 2016 – Bentonville (17), Magnolia (3)
- 2015 – Bentonville (16), Magnolia (2)
- 2014 – Bentonville (15), Magnolia
- 2013 – Bentonville (14)
- 2012 – Bentonville (13)
- 2011 – Bentonville (12)
- 2010 – Bentonville (11)
- 2009 – Bentonville (10)
- 2008 – Bentonville (9)
- 2007 – Bentonville (8)
- 2006 – Bentonville (7)
- 2005 – Bentonville (6)
- 2004 – LR Catholic (11)
- 2003 – LR Catholic (10)
- 2002 – LR Catholic (9)
- 2001 – Fayetteville (10)
- 2000 – Fayetteville (9)
- 1999 – Bentonville (5)
- 1998 – Bentonville (4)
- 1997 – Bentonville (3)
- 1996 – Bentonville (2)
- 1995 – Jonesboro (5)
- 1994 – Bentonville
- 1993 – FS Southside (3)
- 1992 – FS Southside (2)
- 1991 – FS Southside
- 1990 – Siloam Springs
- 1989 – LR Catholic (8)
- 1988 – Conway
- 1987 – LR Catholic (7)
- 1986 – Fayetteville (8)
- 1985 – Fayetteville (7)
- 1984 – LR Catholic (6)
- 1983 – LR Catholic (5)
- 1982 – LR Catholic (4)
- 1981 – Fayetteville (6)
- 1980 – LR Catholic (3)
- 1979 – NA
- 1978 – Fayetteville (5)
- 1977 – LR Catholic (2)
- 1976 – Fayetteville (4)
- 1975 – NA
- 1974 – Fayetteville (3)
- 1973 – Fayetteville (2)
- 1972 – Fayetteville
- 1971 – LR Hall (5)
- 1970 – LR Hall (4), Harmony Grove
- 1969 – LR Hall (3), Drew Central (2)
- 1968 – Jonesboro (4), Drew Central
- 1967 – Jonesboro (3), Wilson (9)
- 1966 – LR Hall (2), Wilson (8)
- 1965 – El Dorado, Wilson (7)
- 1964 – Jonesboro (2), Warren (6)
- 1963 – Jonesboro, Warren (5)
- 1962 – LR Catholic, Warren (4)
- 1961 – LR Hall, Warren (3)
- 1960 – North Little Rock (2), Warren (2)
- 1959 – Fort Smith, Warren
- 1958 – LR Central (5), Crossett (6)
- 1957 – Little Rock (4), Crossett (5)
- 1956 – Little Rock (3), Crossett (4)
- 1955 – NA
- 1954 – No meet held
- 1953 – Little Rock (2), Crossett (3)
- 1952 – Little Rock, Crossett (2)
- 1951 – NA
- 1950 – North Little Rock, Crossett

== List of Arkansas state high school girls swimming and diving champions ==
The following is a list of Arkansas state champions in girls swimming & diving:

- 2025 – Bentonville (26), Valley View, Providence Academy
- 2024 – Bentonville (25), Russellville (4), Clarksville (2)
- 2023 – Bentonville (24), Russellville (3), Magnolia (4)
- 2022 – Bentonville (23), Russellville (2), Magnolia (3)
- 2021 – Bentonville (22), Russellville, Magnolia (2)
- 2020 – Bentonville (21), Mountain Home, Magnolia
- 2019 – Bentonville (20), Jonesboro (2), Clarksville
- 2018 – Fayetteville (5), Haas Hall Academy (3)
- 2017 – Bentonville (19), Haas Hall Academy (2)
- 2016 – Bentonville (18), Haas Hall Academy
- 2015 – Bentonville (17), Pulaski Academy (2)
- 2014 – Bentonville (16), Pulaski Academy
- 2013 – Conway (2)
- 2012 – Bentonville (15)
- 2011 – Bentonville (14)
- 2010 – Bentonville (13)
- 2009 – Bentonville (12)
- 2008 – Mount St. Mary (11)
- 2007 – Bentonville (11)
- 2006 – Bentonville (10)
- 2005 – Bentonville (9)
- 2004 – Bentonville (8)
- 2003 – Bentonville (7)
- 2002 – Fayetteville (4)
- 2001 – LR Central (8)
- 2000 – LR Central (7)
- 1999 – Fayetteville (3)
- 1998 – Bentonville (6)
- 1997 – Bentonville (5)
- 1996 – Jonesboro
- 1995 – Bentonville (4)
- 1994 – Bentonville (3)
- 1993 – Bentonville (2)
- 1992 – LR Central (6)
- 1991 – Bentonville
- 1990 – LR Central (5)
- 1989 – Rogers
- 1988 – Conway
- 1987 – Arkadelphia (2)
- 1986 – Arkadelphia
- 1985 – Mount St. Mary (10)
- 1984 – Mount St. Mary (9)
- 1983 – Siloam Springs (2)
- 1982 – Siloam Springs
- 1981 – Fayetteville (2)
- 1980 – LR Central (4)
- 1979 – NA
- 1978 – Mount St. Mary (8)
- 1977 – Mount St. Mary (7)
- 1976 – Fayetteville
- 1975 – NA
- 1974 – LR Hall (10)
- 1973 – LR Hall (9)
- 1972 – Mount St. Mary (6)
- 1971 – LR Hall (8)
- 1970 – LR Parkview
- 1969 – LR Hall (7)
- 1968 – Mount St. Mary (5)
- 1967 – Mount St. Mary (4)
- 1966 – LR Hall (6)
- 1965 – LR Hall (5)
- 1964 – LR Hall (4)
- 1963 – LR Hall (3)
- 1962 – Warren
- 1961 – LR Hall (2)
- 1960 – LR Hall
- 1959 – Mount St. Mary (3)
- 1958 – Mount St. Mary (2)
- 1957 – Little Rock (3)
- 1956 – Little Rock (2)
- 1955 – NA
- 1954 – No meet held
- 1953 – Mount St. Mary
- 1952 – Little Rock
- 1951 – NA
- 1950 – North Little Rock

== Most state championships ==
Team	Boys' Titles	Boys' Title Years	Girls' Titles	Girls' Title Years
Bentonville	22	1994, 1996, 1997, 1998, 1999, 2005, 2006, 2007, 2008, 2009, 2010, 2011, 2012, 2013, 2014, 2015, 2016, 2017, 2021, 2023, 2024, 2025	26	1991, 1993, 1994, 1995, 1997, 1998, 2003, 2004, 2005, 2006, 2007, 2009, 2010, 2011, 2012, 2014, 2015, 2016, 2017, 2019, 2020, 2021, 2022, 2023, 2024, 2025
LR Catholic / Mount St. Mary	11	1962, 1977, 1980, 1982, 1983, 1984, 1987, 1989, 2002, 2003, 2004	11	1953, 1958, 1959, 1967, 1968, 1972, 1977, 1978, 1984, 1985, 2008

== See also ==
- Arkansas Activities Association
- List of Arkansas state high school football champions
- List of Arkansas state high school basketball champions
- List of Arkansas state high school baseball champions
- List of Arkansas state high school soccer champions
