= Fayetteville High School (Arkansas) =

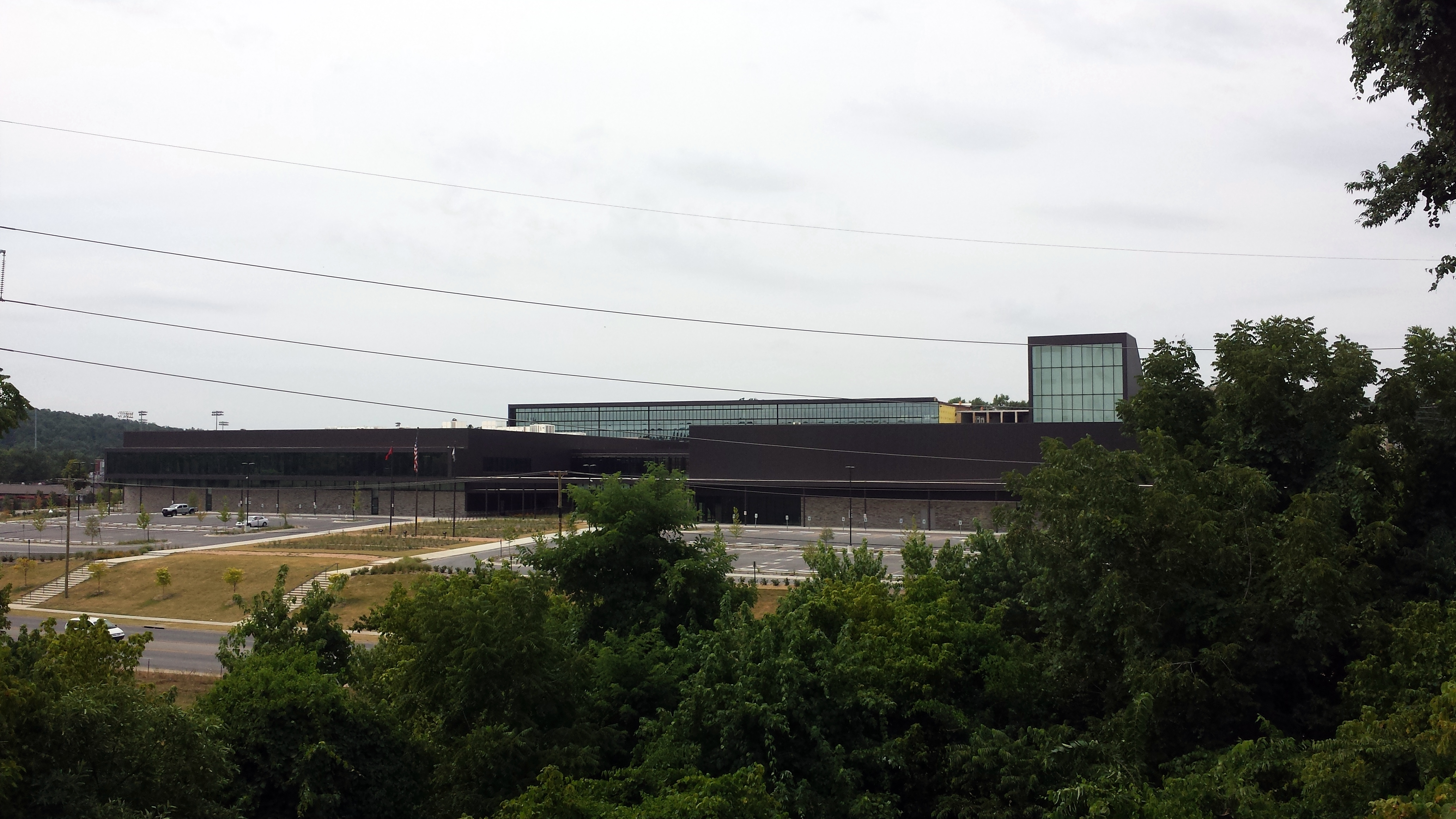

Location
- 994 W. Martin Luther King Blvd. Fayetteville, Arkansas 72701; United States; 36°03′30″N 94°10′26″W

Information
- Type: Public high school
- Motto: Fidelity, Honor, Service
- Established: 1908 (118 years ago)
- School district: Fayetteville Public Schools
- NCES District ID: 0506120
- Superintendent: John Mulford
- CEEB code: 040770
- NCES School ID: 050612000319
- Principal: Michelle Miller
- Teaching staff: 189.88 (on an FTE basis)
- Grades: 9–12
- Student to teacher ratio: 13.69
- Campus: Urban
- Colors: Purple and white
- Athletics conference: 7A West
- Mascot: Purple Bulldog
- Nickname: The Bulldogs, Purple Dogs, Dawgs
- Newspaper: The Register
- Yearbook: The Amethyst
- Website: fhs.fayar.net

Fayetteville High School is a public high school located in Fayetteville, Arkansas. The school is administered by the Fayetteville Public Schools headed by John Mulford.

The district, and by extension, Fayetteville High's attendance boundary, includes the majority of Fayetteville as well as the majorities of Goshen and Johnson and sections of Elkins and Farmington.

== History ==
The school was first opened in 1908, and the previous building was built in 1950 with further renovations made in the 1990s. In 2011, another renovation and massive expansion of the building began, designed by University of Arkansas professor and award-winning architect Marlon Blackwell, in collaboration with the global design firm DLR Group and Rogers-based Hight Jackson Associates. Phase 1 of the current building opened in 2012, Phase 2 in 2013, Phase 3 in 2014, and the final phase opening in 2015. After completion of the final phase, the school integrated ninth graders to the campus.

As part of the 2011-2015 renovation and expansion, the school acquired a new 2,800-seat gymnasium with auxiliary facilities, a wrestling area, and a dance studio. Existing spaces that were remodeled included the music rooms for orchestra, band, and choir, administrative offices, and the cafeteria kitchen. The performing arts center was completely refurbished, and a black box theater was added, along with a TV studio and editing lab from which students live stream the school's athletic events.

The current building, built adjacent to the University of Arkansas and just off Martin Luther King Jr. Boulevard, is also located on the Trail of Tears National Historic Trail as indicated by two roadside signs—one of them a government sign and the other a sign erected by the University.

The school was the first school in Arkansas to voluntarily desegregate when, on September 11, 1954, African American students first attended the high school.

The school's marching band was selected to go to the Tournament of Roses Parade for 2006, which was only the second time an Arkansas band has attended.

== Academics ==
The assumed course of study follows the Smart Core curriculum developed by the Arkansas Department of Education (ADE). Students complete regular (core) and career focus courses and exams and may select Advanced Placement (AP) coursework and exams that provide an opportunity for students to receive college credit.

== Band ==
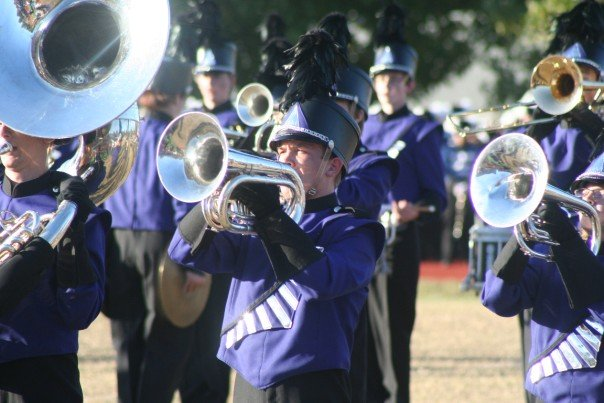
The Fayetteville High School Band at a marching competition in Carthage, MO.

The band has marched in many prestigious parades, including in 1989 the George H. W. Bush Presidential Inauguration Parade, the Fiesta Bowl, the Tournament of Roses Parade, the Hollywood Christmas Parade, the Macy's Thanksgiving Day Parade in both 1998 and 2008, and the 6abc Dunkin' Donuts Thanksgiving Day Parade. The FHS Marching Band as of 2023 is a state runner up and placed top 6th in the Bands of America regional in Johnson City, TN.

== Publications ==
In 2017, Connotations received the Columbia Scholastic Press Association Gold Crown award, the highest award given to literary magazines.

In 2005, Connotations, the school's literary magazine, received a Superior award from the National Council of Teachers of English's Program to Recognize Excellence in Student Literary Magazines.

In 1993, 1995, 1997, 2007 and 2013, Connotations won the National Scholastic Press Association (NSPA) Magazine Pacemaker Award. In 2006, Connotations was placed in the NSPA's Hall of Fame for receiving the highest rating that NSPA awards in its critique service twelve times in the schools' recent history

In 1994, the Columbia Scholastic Press Association awarded Connotations the CSPA's Scholastic Gold Circle Awards for its Overall Design, Cover Design (Two or More Colors), Title and Contents Page, and Typography.

== Athletics ==
The Fayetteville Bulldogs and Lady Bulldogs are highly competitive in the state's largest classification, 7A in football and 6A in all other sports, and are members of the West conference of that classification. State championships include:

- 14-time Boys' Golf (1950–52, 1959–63, 2004, 2013-2017)
- 13-time Girls' Golf (1973, 1975, 1977, 1985, 2001, 2003, 2005–11)
- 12-time Boys' Cross Country Running (1965, 1969–75, 1983–86)
- 10-time Boys' Swimming (1972–74, 1976, 1978, 1981, 1985–86, 2000–01)
- 8-time Girls' Basketball (1979, 1993–94, 2009, 2011, 2015, 2017, 2020)
- 8-time Boys' Tennis (1970, 1972–73, 1976, 1981, 1984, 1989–90)
- 8-time Girls' Gymnastics (between 1998 and 2005)
- 7-time Baseball (1960, 2003, 2006, 2007, 2008, 2009, 2013)
- 7-time Cheerleading (2000, 2006, 2007, 2010–12, 2017, 2019)
- 6-time Football (2007, 2011–12, 2015, 2016, 2023)
- 5-time Boys' Basketball (1948, 1975, 1978, 1987, 2009)
- 5-time Girls soccer, 4-time Runner-up (2002, 2004, 2006, 2009)
- 5-time Girls' Swimming (1976, 1981, 1999, 2002, 2018)
- 5-time Volleyball (2012, 2015, 2016, 2017, 2020)
- 3-time Dance (2016, 2019, 2024)
- 2-time Softball (2006, 2007)

In 2006, Sports Illustrated ranked Fayetteville High School in the nation's Top 20 High School Athletic Programs, stating:

"Located across the street from the University of Arkansas, this school has won a state-best 24 titles in 10 sports since 1996. The Purple Bulldogs’ girls’ gymnastics team has won eight straight state championships, and the girls’ soccer team took four straight from 1998 to 2001, plus one in 2010. Since 1996 the boys’ basketball team has made five appearances in the state semifinals and went to the title game in March. Fayetteville has also won four state championships in indoor track, which is not a recognized sport in the state.

2007 saw the Bulldogs win their first state football championship after 103 years of playing football, defeating Springdale Har-Ber 28-7 in Little Rock. Eight years later, they would duplicate the feat, defeating Har-Ber 28-7 again to claim their fourth state championship.

In March 2009, FHS concluded undefeated seasons in both boys and girls basketball and won 7A state championships. The girls finished 32-0 while the boys finished 30-0, with the boys carding a No. 8 final national ranking.

In December 2011, Fayetteville High's football team upset top-ranked Bentonville and broke their 25-game winning streak with a 29-28 overtime victory in War Memorial Stadium in Little Rock to win their second state football championship. On December 1, 2012, Fayetteville defeated Bentonville again in the 7A state championship game, 31-20, to become the first school in the 7A era to repeat as state champions.

== Controversy ==
On March 24, 2008, The New York Times ran an article accusing the administration and teachers of ignoring violence and bullying against Billy Wolfe, a sophomore who attended Fayetteville High School. After years of abuse, his parents filed a lawsuit against one of the bullies, and considered an additional lawsuit against the district, claiming that their son had been wrongly suspended and accused of being responsible for his own situation by school officials despite evidence that other students were responsible.

Some students had set up a Facebook group titled "Every One Hates Billy Wolfe" calling on them to attack him at school. One entry by a student on March 9, 2007, wrote ""Haha (your ) Billy got clocked today at school and I think one or two of his teeth got knocked out damn my friends are awesome"."

Fayetteville High School representatives responded by saying that, in these types of cases, if laws have been violated then the school reports the incident to the Fayetteville Police Department, and stated that the article was "casting our school district in a very bad and undeserved light."

However, police records, Wolfe's mother, and Fayetteville Police Department Cpl. Craig Stout said an assault report was eventually filed by the Wolfe family, not the school. Wolfe's mother claims she begged the assistant principal of the school, Byron Zeagler, to call the police. "He said my son got what he deserved."

Former Fayetteville Superintendent Bobby New said "We stand behind our administrators and believe they acted appropriately."

Students at Fayetteville High School, in reaction to perceived bias in the New York Times article, stated when being interviewed by the local news that Wolfe "brings a lot of it on himself, that he actually picks a lot of the fights" and "that what he does, is he antagonizes the other person and starts the fight and when he loses he says 'Oh I got beat up.'"

In a local newspaper report the following week, a student claimed that Wolfe "likes to call him names, like stupid or retarded," and "screams in his ear, which is sensitive to noise because of his medical condition…[Wolfe] once pounded him in the back of the head several times with a medium-sized rubber ball."

Following the story's publication, the Fayetteville School District has reported receiving both a threatening phone call to McNair Middle School and an email which "suggested the district would be hit with some sort of Internet or computer network attack."

A decade ago a student attending Fayetteville High School's Vocational Campus was harassed and beaten for being homosexual. At that time the administration of Fayetteville School District had promised the office of Civil Rights they would adopt procedures to promote tolerance and respect.

Currently, Fayetteville High School has a Gay-Straight Alliance, which was picketed by members of the Westboro Baptist Church in the fall of 2004.

-In 2016, several teenagers rented a goat for $10 and recorded videos of the goat being abused at a party. The teenage boys broke open beer cans by slamming it on the head of the young goat. The situation made the news but there were no animal cruelty charges.

-In 2018, students were suspended for making racial slurs at another student during black history month.

-During September 2021, two teenagers were taken into custody after fighting on the campus. The entire school went on lockdown without much warning when several fights took place during lunch. The students were left in the dark without any information and held in their classrooms. One student was pregnant.

== Notable alumni ==
- Austin Allen, Class of 2013 - quarterback for Tampa Bay Buccaneers
- Brandon Allen, Class of 2011 - quarterback for Los Angeles Rams, Jacksonville Jaguars, Cincinnati Bengals, San Francisco 49ers
- Nick Bradford, Class of 1996 - basketball player, University of Kansas and European professional
- Ronnie Brewer, Class of 2003 - University of Arkansas basketball standout, 14th overall pick in 2006 NBA draft, player for nine seasons, most notably for Chicago Bulls
- Michael Brisiel, Class of 2001 - player for NFL's Oakland Raiders
- Sarah Caldwell, Class of 1938 (at age of 14) - opera conductor and opera company director; first woman to conduct New York Metropolitan Opera
- Cody Clark, Class of 2000 - baseball player drafted by Toronto Blue Jays in 2000; played college baseball at Wichita State
- Matt Covington, Class of 1998 - speleologist professor at the University of Arkansas
- Dre Greenlaw, Class of 2015 - football player for the Denver Broncos
- Ronnie Hawkins, Class of 1952 - musician; The Band once played backup for him
- Skip Holtz, Class of 1982 - football head coach at Louisiana Tech
- Joseph Israel, Class of 1996 - reggae musician
- Grant Koch, Class of 2015 - MLB with Pittsburgh Pirates
- Drake Lindsey, Class of 2024 - college football quarterback for the Minnesota Golden Gophers
- Sherm Lollar, Class of 1941 (at age of 16) - MLB player
- James Duard Marshall, Class of 1933 - artist, painter, lithographer, student of Thomas Hart Benton
- Jason Moore, Class of 1989 - television, film, and Broadway director. Director - Pitch Perfect Movie.
- Blake Parker, Class of 2003 - baseball pitcher for multiple MLB teams
- Isaiah Sategna III, Class of 2022 – college football wide receiver for the Oklahoma Sooners
- Savvy Shields, Class of 2013 - Miss America 2017
- Wallace Spearmon, Class of 2003 - athlete, 2006 World Indoor 4 × 400 m relay gold medalist, two-time Olympian
- Mary Kate Wiles, Class of 2005 - actress on Emmy-winning webseries The Lizzie Bennet Diaries
- Payton Willis, Class of 2016 - basketball player in the Israeli Basketball Premier League
