= Southside High School (Fort Smith, Arkansas) =

Location
- 4100 Gary St; Fort Smith, Arkansas 72903; United States; 35°20′55″N 94°23′19″W

Information
- Type: Public
- Established: 1963 (63 years ago)
- Superintendent: Terry Morawski
- NCES School ID: 050633000373
- Principal: Jeff Prewitt
- Teaching staff: 190.86 (on FTE basis)
- Grades: 9–12
- Enrollment: approx. 2 000 (2024-2025)
- Student to teacher ratio: 10.76
- Campus: Urban
- Colors: Columbia blue and red
- Athletics: Arkansas Activities Association
- Athletics conference: 6A West
- Mascot: Mavericks
- Team name: Southside Mavericks
- Website: southside.fortsmithschools.org

Southside High School is a public high school located on Gary Street in Fort Smith in Arkansas, United States. Founded in 1963, it is a comprehensive school. As of 2025, the school had approximately 2 000 pupils enrolled, between the ages of 14 to 18.

== Governance ==
Southside is one of two public high schools in Fort Smith, the other being Northside High School. Both are administered by the Fort Smith School District.

The school is a three-time recipient of the National Blue Ribbon Schools Award of Excellence by the U.S. Department of Education (ED).

== History ==
The school was opened in 1963, with the main building was designed by Fort Smith architects Mott, Mobley, Horstman & Staton. It originally consisted of 44 classrooms in total and was continually expanded beginning in 1968. In 1966, the school was accredited by AdvancED, formerly North Central Association Commission on Accreditation and School Improvement. Since its opening, over 15 000 students have graduated from the school.

=== Mascot controversy ===
The Southside High School mascot was originally the Rebels (de facto Johnny Reb, a personification of a Confederate soldier). The mascot and the school's fight song "Dixie" were controversial, due to their being "perceived symbols of racism." In 2000, Principal Wayne Haver banned the display of the Confederate flag at the school and at school events. Talk of replacing Johnny Reb with a Mustang had circulated since the 1980s but no change was made until the summer of 2015.

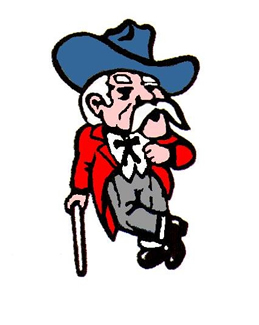
Southside Rebel

On June 23, 2015, a Fort Smith School Board committee banned the playing of "Dixie" and voted to replace the Rebels nickname before the 2016–17 school year. On July 27, 2015, the Fort Smith School Board voted 7–0 to change the Rebel mascot and fight song. On July 30, 2015, principal Haver announced that the new fight song would be "Wabash Cannonball". Beginning with the 2016–2017 school year, Southside's official nickname became the Mavericks.

== Academics ==
The school flies three flags for "Excellence in Education" presented by previous presidents Ronald Reagan, George H. W. Bush, and Bill Clinton at ceremonies held in Washington, D.C.

- In 1982–1983, Southside received its first National Blue Ribbon "School of Excellence" recognition.
- In 1986–1987, the first year any previously selected school was eligible to be renominated, Southside was one of only four schools nationally to be selected to repeat as a "School of Excellence."
- In 1999–2000, Southside was recognized for the third time as a "School of Excellence".
- Siemens Award for Advanced Placement 2008.

== Sport and extracurricular activities ==
Southside is part of the Arkansas Activities Association and competes in division 6A west.

=== American football ===
Southside football teams have won seven state championships at the state's highest classification (1983, 1988, 1991, 1992, 1997, 2002, 2006). In 2008 and in 2009, Southside made surprising runs to the state championship game, but fell short to Bentonville in 2008 and to Springdale Har-Ber in 2009.

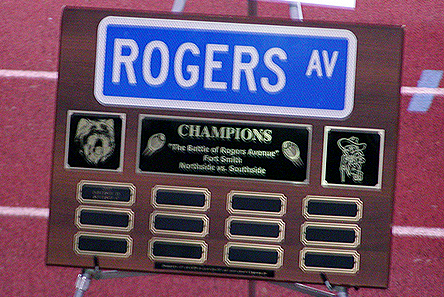
Battle of Rogers Avenue Plaque

In the early 1960s when Fort Smith High School was separated into two schools, the split was the start of one of the premier high school sports rivalries in Arkansas. Because Fort Smith is divided down the middle by Rogers Avenue and Southside sits on one side of Rogers Avenue and Northside sits on the other, the game has been called the "Battle of Rogers Avenue". This game has become a huge event locally in the city of Fort Smith and the surrounding area (usually drawing around 10 000 people to the event), even elevating to the level of shutting down some local schools and businesses on the day of the game. Southside beat Northside, for the first time, in 1978 and repeated in 1979.

The historic 2004 and 2005 football seasons for the Fort Smith Southside Rebels featured a phenomenal era of quarterback play, highlighted by a major positional transition and the chasing of legendary school records.

The 2010 game at Southside was filmed by NFL Network as part of their American Great Rivalries program and aired on national television in January 2011; the Rebels won the game 56-29.

=== Athletics ===
The Southside track teams won three consecutive 7A class state track championships (2009, 2010, 2011). The Lady Mavericks are one of the state's most successful with 10 state track championships (1981, 1982, 1983, 1985, 1990, 1991, 1992, 1993, 1994, 1995, 2007).

=== Bowling ===
The bowling teams of Southside High have been one of the state's most successful with state championships in 2008, 2009 (boys), and 2010 (girls).

=== Volleyball ===
Fort Smith Southside volleyball teams have won seven state championships (4A - 1997; 5A - 1999, 2003, 2004; 7A - 2006, 2009, 2013).

=== Other activities ===
The school has routinely done well in education/knowledge based competitions, to include:

- Quiz bowl State Champions (3A - 1996; 7A - 2007, 2010, 2013, 2014, 2022, 2026)
- National Science Bowl (NSB) – Arkansas Regional (and State) Champions (2002, 2003, 2004, 2005, 2006, 2007, 2013, 2014)
- National Science Bowl – National Event 2007 (tied-13th place)
- Knowledge Master Open State Champions (01F, 02S, 02F, 03S, 06F, 07S, 07F, 09S, 09F, 10F, 11F, 12F)
- Two students have been recognized as a state winner of a Siemens AP Scholar Award.
- Eight students have been recognized as Presidential Scholars.

== Notable alumni ==
=== Sport ===
- Jim Files, former NFL linebacker with the NY Giants
- Jeff McKnight, former MLB player (New York Mets, Baltimore Orioles)

=== Politics ===
- Denny Altes, member of the Arkansas House of Representatives.

=== Entertainment ===
- Madison Marsh, Miss America 2024
- Hunter Doohan, actor who played Tyler Galpin in Wednesday (TV series)
- Xin Li, model
