= List of Arkansas state high school baseball champions =

This is a list of Arkansas state high school baseball championships sanctioned by the Arkansas Activities Association.

Listings include champions at each classification level based on size (largest classification is listed first). Early years of high school baseball were limited to a single state championship. High school baseball is a spring sport.

== List of Arkansas state high school baseball state champions ==
- 2026 – Har-Ber (4), Valley View (6), Pulaski Academy (6), Harmony Grove (2), Palestine-Wheatley, Taylor (10)
- 2025 – Rogers (2), Valley View (5), Harding Academy (8), Ashdown, Riverside, Taylor (9)
- 2024 – Har-Ber (3), Valley View (4), Prairie Grove, Gosnell (2), Ouachita (3), Taylor (8)
- 2023 – Har-Ber (2), Little Rock Christian, Lonoke (2), Harding Academy (7), Woodlawn (9), Taylor (7)
- 2022 – Conway (4), Marion, Huntsville (3), Harding Academy (6), Woodlawn (8), Taylor (6)
- 2021 – Rogers, Van Buren, Valley View (3), Harding Academy (5), Woodlawn (7), Viola (4)
- 2020 – (No Championships contested due to COVID-19 pandemic)
- 2019 – North Little Rock (3), Sheridan (2), Nashville (4), Benton Harmony Grove, Junction City (9), Viola (3)
- 2018 – Springdale Har-Ber, Greenwood, Sylvan Hills (8), Nashville (3), Harding Academy (4), Parker’s Chapel (4), Woodlawn (6)
- 2017 – Cabot, Sheridan (2), Vilonia (2), Nashville (2), Harding Academy (3), Spring Hill, Woodlawn (5)
- 2016 – Bryant (4), Jonesboro (2), Magnolia (2), Shiloh Christian (4), Horatio (5), Woodlawn (4), Armorel (4)
- 2015 – Bentonville (2), Sheridan, Harrison (2), Star City, Mayflower (2), Ouachita (2), Armorel (3)
- 2014 – Bryant (3), Russellville (3), White Hall (3), Arkadelphia (2), Genoa Central (2), Junction City (8), South Side Bee Branch (2)
- 2013 – Fayetteville (7), Jonesboro, Pulaski Academy (5), Arkadelphia, Harding Academy (2), Conway St. Joseph, Taylor (5)
- 2012 – Bryant (2), El Dorado, White Hall (2), Shiloh Christian (3), Genoa Central, Woodlawn (3), Midland (2)
- 2011 – Conway (3), Jacksonville (2), Magnolia, Shiloh Christian (2), Jessieville, Parkers Chapel (3), Armorel (2)
- 2010 – Bryant, Lake Hamilton, Beebe, Shiloh Christian, Bauxite, Woodlawn (2), Trinity Christian
- 2009 – Fayetteville (6), Benton, Central Arkansas Christian (6), Valley View (2), Elkins (2), McCrory, Taylor (4)
- 2008 – Fayetteville (5), Sylvan Hills (7), Harrison, Valley View, Harding Academy, Woodlawn, Taylor (3)
- 2007 – Fayetteville (4), Texarkana (5), Greene County Tech (3), Nashville, Horatio (4), Parkers Chapel (2), South Side Bee Branch
- 2006 – Fayetteville (3), Greenwood (3), Elkins, Abundant Life, Armorel
- 2005 – Sylvan Hills (6), Batesville (4), Warren, Horatio (3), Taylor (2)
- 2004 – North Little Rock (2), Batesville, Central Arkansas Christian (5), Junction City (7), Taylor
- 2003 – Fayetteville (2), Sylvan Hills (5), Pulaski Academy (4), Norphlet, Concord
- 2002 – Bentonville, Alma, Pulaski Academy (3), Parkers Chapel, Fort Smith Christian
- 2001 – Russellville (2), Malvern (2), Booneville, Lavaca (2), Scranton
- 2000 – Texarkana (4), Watson Chapel (4), Central Arkansas Christian (4), Horatio (2), Ouachita
- 1999 – Mills University Studies (3), Greenwood (2), Fouke, Baptist, Viola (2)
- 1998 – Springdale, Batesville (3), Vilonia, Smackover (2), Viola
- 1997 – Mountain Home, Crossett, Huntsville, Horatio, Bradley
- 1996 – North Little Rock, Watson Chapel (3), Greenbrier (2), Mayflower, Nemo Vista
- 1995 – Pine Bluff (10), Batesville (2), Huntsville, Central Arkansas Christian (3), Mount Vernon–Enola
- 1994 – Texarkana (3), Batesville, Pulaski Academy (2), Central Arkansas Christian (2), Stephens
- 1993 – Russellville, Crossett, Mena, Pulaski Academy, Midland
- 1992 – Pine Bluff (9), Malvern, Junction City (6), Clay County Central, Tuckerman
- 1991 – Watson Chapel (2), Clinton, Smackover
- 1990 – Mills University Studies (2), Gosnell, Central Arkansas Christian
- 1989 – Conway (2), Junction City (5), Pea Ridge
- 1988 – Watson Chapel, Clarksville (3)
- 1987 – Jacksonville, Ridgecrest
- 1986 – Pine Bluff (8), Lavaca
- 1985 – Pine Bluff (7), Farmington
- 1984 – Pine Bluff (6), Greenbrier
- 1983 – Pine Bluff (5), Paragould Oak Grove
- 1982 – Texarkana (2), West Fork
- 1981 – Sylvan Hills (4), Junction City (4)
- 1980 – White Hall, Junction City (3)
- 1979 – Pine Bluff (4), Highland
- 1978 – Sylvan Hills (3), Mansfield
- 1977 – Junction City (2)
- 1976 – Texarkana
- 1975 – Mills University Studies
- 1974 – Sylvan Hills (2)
- 1973 – Pine Bluff (3)
- 1972 – Junction City
- 1971 – Little Rock Catholic (2)
- 1970 – Little Rock Catholic
- 1969 – Lonoke
- 1968 – Fort Smith St. Annes (2)
- 1967 – Fort Smith St. Annes
- 1966 – Greenwood
- 1965 – Sylvan Hills
- 1964 – Greene County Tech (2)
- 1963 – Bay
- 1962 – Greene County Tech
- 1961 – Pine Bluff (2)
- 1960 – Fayetteville
- 1959 – Pine Bluff
- 1958 – Mountainburg (2)
- 1957 – Mountainburg
- 1956 – Clarksville (2)
- 1955 – Clarksville
- 1922 - Little Rock High School (Central)
- 1911 – Conway

== Most state championships ==
Team	Titles	Title Years (Spring)
Pine Bluff	10	1959, 1961, 1973, 1979, 1983, 1984, 1985, 1986, 1992, 1995
Taylor	10	2004, 2005, 2008, 2009, 2013, 2022, 2023, 2024, 2025, 2026
Junction City	9	1972, 1977, 1980, 1981, 1989, 1992, 2004, 2014, 2019
Woodlawn	9	2008, 2010, 2012, 2016, 2017, 2018, 2021, 2022, 2023
Sylvan Hills	8	1965, 1974, 1978, 1981, 2003, 2005, 2008, 2018
Harding Academy	8	2008, 2013 2017, 2018, 2021, 2022, 2023, 2025

== See also ==
- Arkansas Activities Association
- Billy Bock
- List of high schools in Arkansas
