= Dean Bryant Vollendorf =

American architect, teacher (1929–2008)

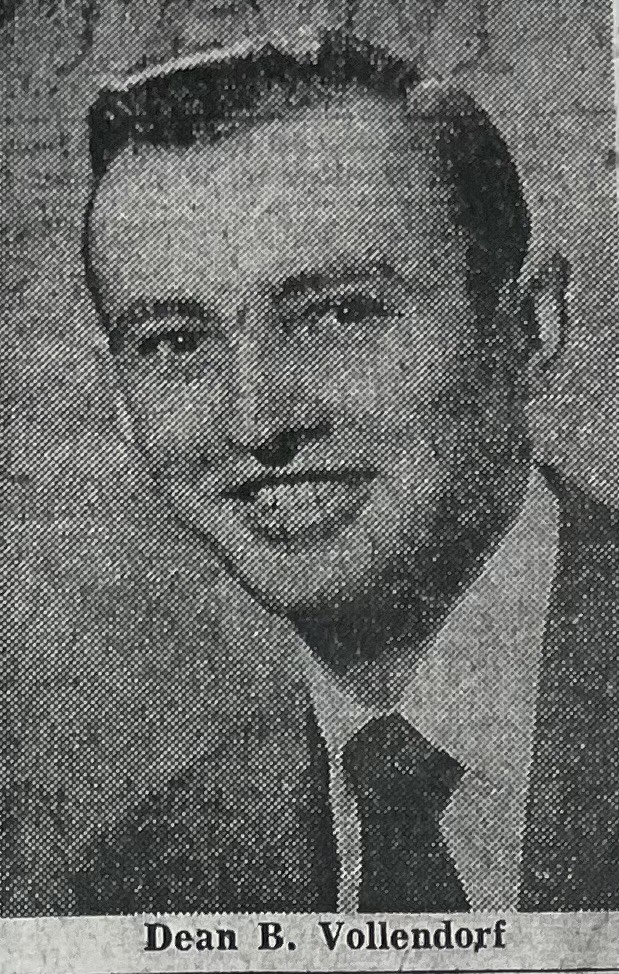
- Born: August 25, 1929; Sheboygan, Wisconsin, U.S.
- Died: May 6, 2008 (aged 78)
- Occupation: Architect

Dean Bryant Vollendorf (August 25, 1929 – May 6, 2008) was an American architect specializing in organic architecture with influences from Frank Lloyd Wright, Bruce Goff, and Herb Greene.

== Career ==
=== Architecture career ===
Vollendorf worked for the Corps of Engineers, Edgar A. Stubenrauch and Associates, John Randal McDonald, John Westerlund, and Bob Opsah designing residential and commercial buildings.

Vollendorf's work was included in The New Homes Guide, House Beautiful, and Friends of Kebyar. His 'Baysweep' design was a best-selling floorplan and can be seen in the Cecil M. Buffalo Jr. House listed on the National Register of Historic Places.

Some of Vollendorf's designs in Oklahoma include the Vollendorf Residence, the Bernstein Residence added to the National Register in 2018, and the Jischke (Jiskie) Residence.

=== Academic career ===
Vollendorf was a Professor of Architecture at the University of Florida, the University of Oklahoma, Clemson University, and the University of North Carolina at Charlotte.

== Exhibitions ==
- "Dean Bryant Vollendorf Exhibition", Wisconsin State University, Eau Claire, Wisconsin, October 7 – 18, 1968
- "Vollendorf in Oklahoma", University of Oklahoma, Norman, Oklahoma, February 16 – March 13, 2026

== Legacy ==
Vollendorf's work is the foundation for The Vollendorf Method which is a sequence of exercises used to create rectangular plan designs.

A collection of Vollendorf's papers is at the Oklahoma History Center.
