= Edgar A. Stubenrauch =

American architect (1894–1988)

- Born: Edgar Albert Stubenrauch; July 9, 1894; Sheboygan, Wisconsin, U.S.
- Died: July 20, 1988 (aged 94)
- Other name: E. A. Stubenrauch
- Occupation: Architect
- Spouse: Lillian Tasche
- Children: 3

Edgar Albert Stubenrauch (July 9, 1894 – July 20, 1988) was an American architect in Sheboygan, Wisconsin. Several works he designed are listed on the National Register of Historic Places. His firm was Edgar Stubenrauch and Associates.

== Life and career ==
In April 1921, Stubenrauch opened his architecture firm, Edgar Stubenrauch and Associates, in Sheboygan, Wisconsin. He worked across the Midwest for more than 50 years. He built a home in 1924, at 133 Lake Court in Sheboygan, and lived it for much of his life with his family. He was married to Lillian (née Tasche), and they had three children.

He was known for designing public buildings, churches, schools, and homes. Buildings he designed include Sheboygan Armory (1942), Sheboygan Memorial Hospital (1933), the U.S. Post Office on North Ninth Street, and several dozen private homes.

Architects Harold P. Satre, and Dean Bryant Vollendorf worked at his firm.

== List of works ==
=== Works on the National Register of Historic Places ===
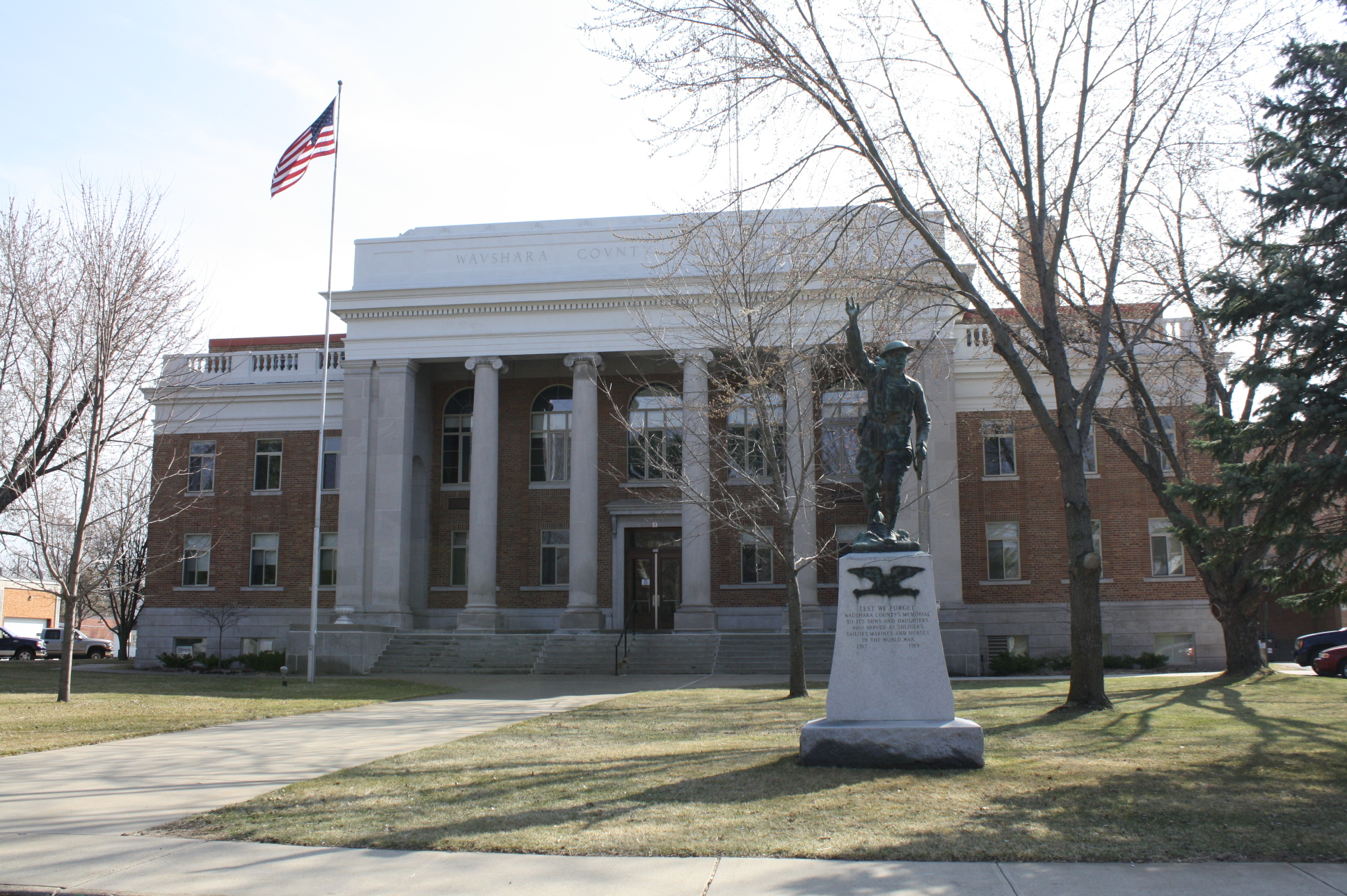
Waushara County Courthouse (1928)

- Waushara County Courthouse (1928) at 209 St. Marie Street in Wautoma, Wisconsin; demolished in 2025
- Lake View Sanatorium, main building (1929–1930) at 1204 Northport Drive in Madison, Wisconsin
- Hope Reformed Church (1937) in the Downtown Churches Historic District in Sheboygan, Wisconsin
- Sheboygan Post Office (1937), North 9th Street, Sheboygan, Wisconsin
- Sheboygan Armory (1942), at 516 Broughton Drive in Sheboygan, Wisconsin; demolished in 2020

=== Other work ===
- Francis J. and Margery Sellinger House (1919) 1121 North 7th Street, Sheboygan, Wisconsin
- Zelma Snell House (1922), moved in 1928 to 414 Erie Avenue, Sheboygan, Wisconsin; also known as Plath–Roenitz House
- William and Emilie Jung House (1922) at 512 Michigan Avenue, Sheboygan, Wisconsin
- Mohr Bakery (1923), Sheboygan, Wisconsin; the bakery building became home to Sunlight Books
- Edgar Stubenrauch House (1924) at 133 Lake Court, Sheboygan, Wisconsin
- Sheboygan Memorial Hospital (1933), Sheboygan, Wisconsin
- Community School (c. 1958), Waterloo, Wisconsin

== Publications ==
- Stubenrauch, Edgar A. (January 8, 1941). "Architect Edgar A. Stubenrauch Describes Building In Detail". The Sheboygan Press. p. 16 – via Newspapers.com.
