= Landmark, Arkansas =

- CDP
- Location of Landmark in Pulaski County, Arkansas.
- Coordinates: 34°37′14″N 92°18′54″W
- Country: United States
- State: Arkansas
- County: Pulaski

Area
  - Total: 9.91 sq mi (25.66 km^{2})
  - Land: 9.83 sq mi (25.46 km^{2})
  - Water: 0.077 sq mi (0.20 km^{2})
- Elevation: 384 ft (117 m)

Population (2020)
  - Total: 3,585
  - Density: 364.7/sq mi (140.81/km^{2})
- Time zone: UTC-6 (Central (CST))
  - Summer (DST): UTC-5 (CDT)
- ZIP code: 72206
- Area code: 501
- FIPS code: 05-53555
- GNIS feature ID: 2403399

Landmark (formerly known as Parkers-Iron Springs) is a census-designated place (CDP) in Pulaski County, Arkansas, United States. Per the 2020 census, the population was 3,585. It is part of the Little Rock–North Little Rock–Conway Metropolitan Statistical Area.

== Geography ==
According to the United States Census Bureau, the CDP has a total area of 9.3 square miles (24 km^{2}), of which, 9.2 square miles (24 km^{2}) of it is land and 0.1 square miles (0.26 km^{2}) of it (8.18%) is water.

There is a small lake, Landmark Lake.

== Demographics ==
Historical population
Census	Pop.	Note	%±
2000	3,499		—
2010	3,555		1.6%
2020	3,585		0.8%
U.S. Decennial Census; 2010 2020

=== Racial and ethnic composition ===
Landmark CDP, Arkansas – Racial and ethnic composition Note: the U.S. census treats Hispanic/Latino as an ethnic category. This table excludes Latinos from the racial categories and assigns them to a separate category. Hispanics/Latinos may be of any race.
Race / Ethnicity (NH = Non-Hispanic)	Pop 2010	Pop 2020	% 2010	% 2020
White alone (NH)	2,712	2,348	76.29%	65.50%
Black or African American alone (NH)	473	523	13.31%	14.59%
Native American or Alaska Native alone (NH)	10	4	0.28%	0.11%
Asian alone (NH)	29	24	0.82%	0.67%
Pacific Islander alone (NH)	1	1	0.03%	0.03%
Some Other Race alone (NH)	2	3	0.06%	0.08%
Mixed Race or Multi-Racial (NH)	81	171	2.28%	4.77%
Hispanic or Latino (any race)	247	511	6.95%	14.25%
Total	3,555	3,585	100.00%	100.00%

=== 2020 census ===
As of the 2020 census, Landmark had a population of 3,585. The median age was 44.8 years. 20.8% of residents were under the age of 18 and 21.9% of residents were 65 years of age or older. For every 100 females there were 96.9 males, and for every 100 females age 18 and over there were 93.5 males age 18 and over.

0.0% of residents lived in urban areas, while 100.0% lived in rural areas.

There were 1,480 households in Landmark, of which 22.4% had children under the age of 18 living in them. Of all households, 44.2% were married-couple households, 19.5% were households with a male householder and no spouse or partner present, and 29.4% were households with a female householder and no spouse or partner present. About 33.5% of all households were made up of individuals and 12.9% had someone living alone who was 65 years of age or older.

There were 1,655 housing units, of which 10.6% were vacant. The homeowner vacancy rate was 1.8% and the rental vacancy rate was 7.3%.

=== 2000 census ===
As of the census of 2000, there were 3,499 people, 1,434 households, and 1,059 families residing in the CDP. The population density was 378.0 inhabitants per square mile (145.9/km^{2}). There were 1,564 housing units at an average density of 168.9 per square mile (65.2/km^{2}). The racial makeup of the CDP was 85.05% White, 11.37% Black or African American, 0.40% Native American, 0.51% Asian, 0.74% from other races, and 1.91% from two or more races. 1.66% of the population were Hispanic or Latino of any race.

There were 1,434 households, out of which 26.5% had children under the age of 18 living with them, 59.8% were married couples living together, 10.7% had a female householder with no husband present, and 26.1% were non-families. 22.2% of all households were made up of individuals, and 6.6% had someone living alone who was 65 years of age or older. The average household size was 2.44 and the average family size was 2.82.

In the CDP, the population was spread out, with 20.9% under the age of 18, 8.4% from 18 to 24, 29.4% from 25 to 44, 29.7% from 45 to 64, and 11.5% who were 65 years of age or older. The median age was 40 years. For every 100 females, there were 96.7 males. For every 100 females aged 18 and over, there were 96.7 males.

The median income for a household in the CDP was $39,766, and the median income for a family was $47,813. Males had a median income of $31,782 versus $25,205 for females. The per capita income for the CDP was $19,508. About 3.4% of families and 4.6% of the population were below the poverty line, including 4.8% of those under age 18 and 1.1% of those age 65 or over.

== Education ==
Landmark is part of the Pulaski County Special School District. It has one school in the CDP, Landmark Elementary School, whose mascot is the Cardinals.

Landmark CDP is divided between Landmark and Daisy Bates elementary schools, and all parts are zoned to Mills Middle School, formerly known as Fuller Middle School, and Wilbur D. Mills High School.

== Early Settlement History ==
Landmark is composed of prior settlements and townships; Parkers, Iron Springs, and Union Township. It was formed within the southern reaches of Pulaski County in 1859. Enoch Davis received his land patent in 1843 and was the only land owner in the area; however, by the end of the Civil War, approximately 8 families lived in the area. Several families soon secured land patents, leaving their names on local creeks, including Brewer, Ledbetter, Treadway, and Bunch branches. These are tributaries of the protected Fourche Creek watershed system.

In 1878, Robert Parker, a store owner in northern Union Township, petitioned for a local post office under the name Bermuda. While his request for a post office was approved, the proposed name was rejected in favor of "Parkers." The post office remained in operation until its closure in 1906, after which the Parkers and Iron Springs areas were incorporated into a rural postal route managed from Little Rock.

The name Landmark originates from the Landmark Missionary Baptist Church, established in 1885. The church and the attached cemetery are still in use today. Its founders, former members of Pine Grove Church in nearby Sweet Home, split from their congregation over a dispute about sharing their building with Methodists and Presbyterians. Rejecting such cooperation as a threat to their doctrinal integrity, they chose the name "Landmark" to signify adherence to traditional Baptist teachings. They were later joined by members of the East Union Baptist Church of Saline County after its schoolhouse relocated. In October 1885, the congregation was accepted into the Pine Bluff Missionary Baptist Association. Squires Wright donated an acre for the church, built from locally sourced lumber, and in 1896, Joel Bunch provided land for a cemetery.

Following the Civil War, there was a greater need for a public school. One was established; however, the schoolhouse relocated multiple times over the years. In 1877, the Iron Springs School operated near Lorance Creek in the township’s southern region. A schoolhouse was later built on Hickory Hill, east of the church, which itself served as a schoolhouse from 1918 to 1921. In 1920, the district was consolidated into a countywide system. Today, Landmark Elementary School remains part of the Pulaski County Special School District, located on Arch Street Pike, north of the church. It has been in continuous operation since 1921, with the currently building completed in the 1970s.

== Notable Structures ==
- Carmichael House was added to the National Register of Historical Places (NRHP) in 2018.
- Cecil M. Buffalo Jr. House was added to the NRHP in 2018.
