= Harold P. Satre =

Wisconsin architect (1899–1957)

Harold P. Satre (1899–1957) was an architect in Wisconsin. He was a partner at Satre & Senescall in Sheboygan with Lionel C. Senescall. The firm was succeeded by Fields-Carter.

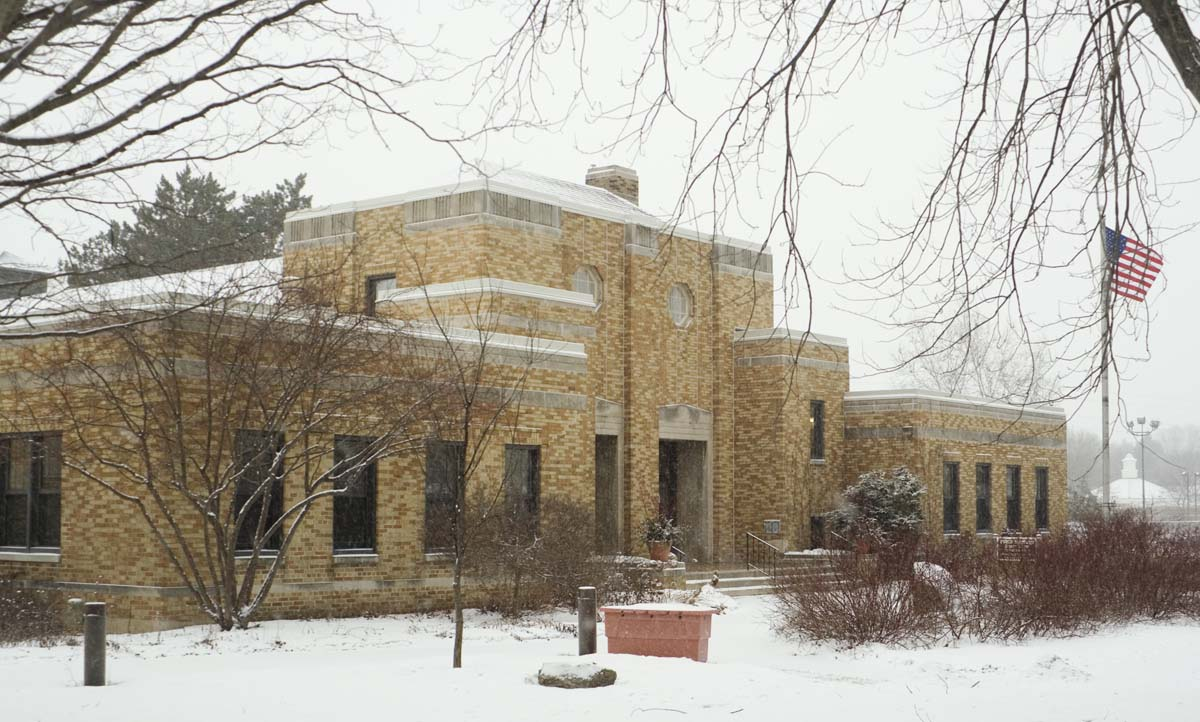
Mequon Town Hall

Satre was born in Sheboygan. His photograph is in the 1917 Sheboygan High School yearbook. He attended the University of Illinois. From 1923 to 1925 he was draftsman for Sheboygan architect E. A. Stubenrauch. He had his own firm from 1925 to 1930.

== Work ==
- Sheboygan Paint Company factory (1928) at 1102 North Eighth Street in Sheboygan

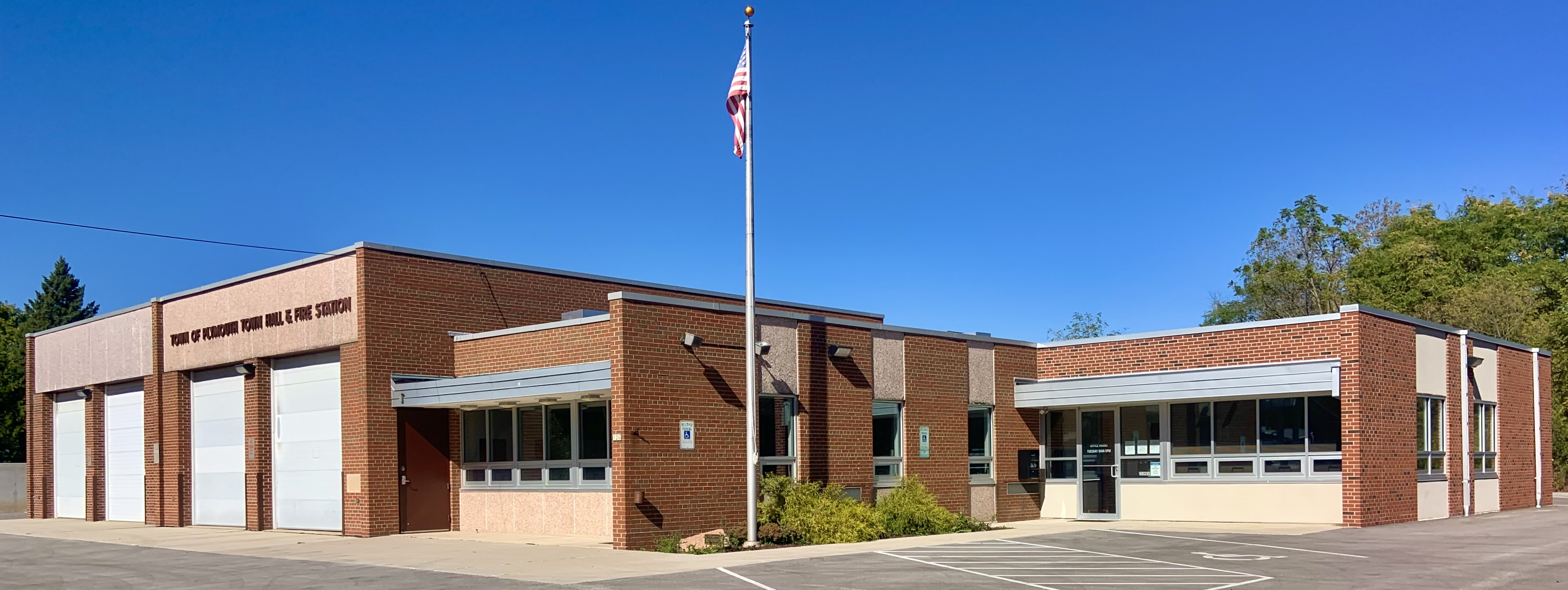
Plymouth Town Hall and Fire Station

- Wilson Town Hall (1934) at 5933 South Business Dr. in Wilson, Sheboygan County, Wisconsin
- Mequon Town Hall and Fire Station Complex (1937) NRHP listed

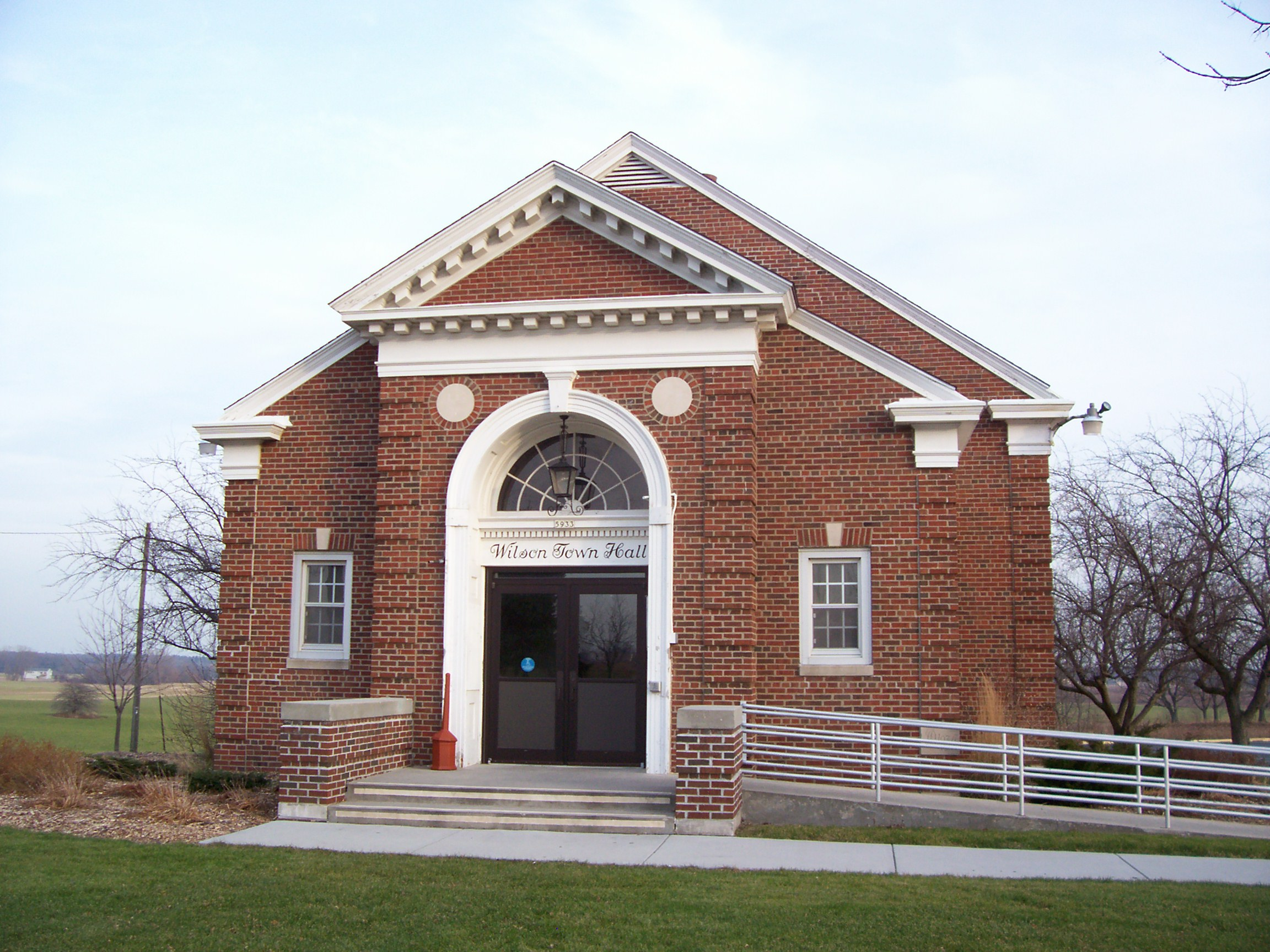
Wilson Town Hall

- Sheboygan County Courthouse, associate architects
- Pigeon River Elementary School
- Plymouth City Hall in Plymouth, Wisconsin
- Maysteel industrial building (1946) in Sheboygan
- Zion Reformed Church (1953)
- James Madison Elementary School (1953) at 2302 David Avenue in Sheboygan
- Bethany Reformed Church (1959) 1316 Washington Avenue in Sheboygan
- Wilson Elementary School (1959) at 1625 Wilson Avenue in Sheboygan
