= Mickey Muennig =

American architect (1935–2021)

- Born: George Kaye Muennig; April 20, 1935; Joplin, Missouri, U.S.
- Died: June 10, 2021 (aged 86); Monterey County, California, U.S.
- Other names: G. K. “Mickey” Muennig, G. K. Muennig, George Kay Muennig
- Education: University of Oklahoma
- Occupation: Architect
- Movement: Organic architecture

Mickey Muennig (born George Kaye Muennig; April 20, 1935 – June 10, 2021) was an American architect. He was known for this organic architecture in Big Sur, along the California coast.

== Early life and education ==
George Kaye Muennig was born on April 20, 1935, in Joplin, Jasper County, Missouri. He got his nickname Mickey, by his older sister, due to his outward semblance with Mickey Mouse.

He began his college education at Georgia Institute of Technology, hoping to study aeronautical engineering. After his first year of college he decided to transfer to the University of Oklahoma to study architecture under Bruce Goff, and Herb Greene.

== Career ==
"At a time when most architecture seems merely argumentative, these buildings (by Muennig) are relaxed and free, filled with...real joy."

— Michael Sorkin, architectural critic

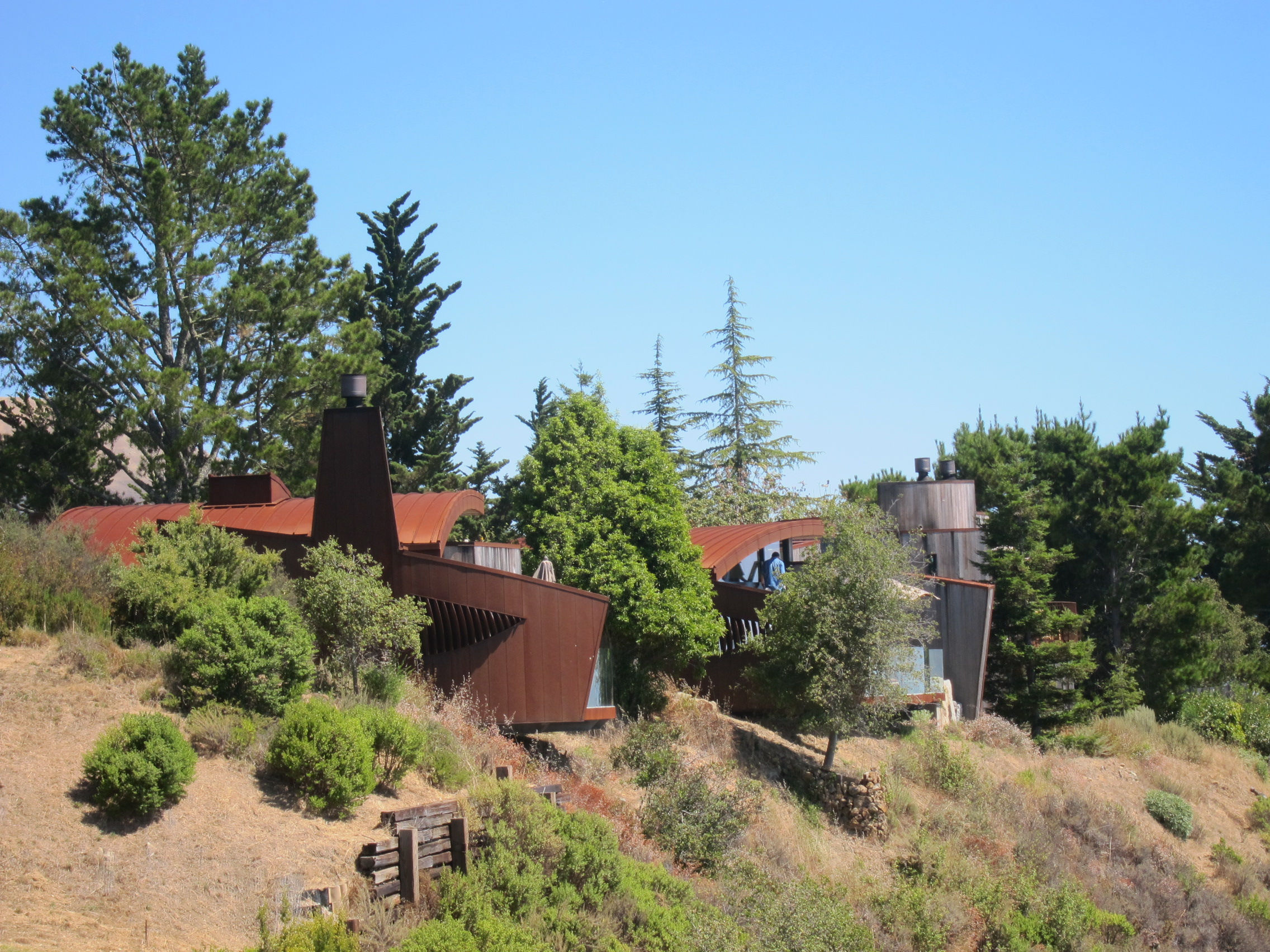
Post Ranch Inn, Big Sur, California (2010)

After graduation he had apprenticeships in New Orleans, Louisiana, and Long Beach, Mississippi. In 1969, he moved to Denver for an architecture job that did not materialize and his family stayed in Denver until 1971.

In 1971, Muenning went to a two week Gestalt therapy class in the Big Sur at Esalen Institute, he described it as an enlightening experience and decide to stay a week longer. He was able to blend his architectural design with the local materials, and create homes that felt like they were a part of Big Sur. He was a proponent of underground houses for both temperature control and fire proofing, as well as building on stilts. Many of his works have been described as "magical", "creative", or "visionary". Some of the houses had issues with livability according to Edward Bazinet, a client of Muenning's, as he had failed to plan for the need of furniture.

The Post Ranch Inn, a luxury resort in Big Sur opened in April 1991. Muenning's design work for the Post Ranch Inn featured buildings with geometric inspiration by animals (such as the butterfly), as well as towers and cylinders that are a nod to Bruce Goff. The guest rooms were arranged in a village, made of individual small structures. The hotel design was meant to not compete with the landscape, the hotel is located on a dramatic coastal bluff and had views of migrating whales in the Pacific Ocean.

In 2000 and 2002, Architectural Digest had listed Muenning as one of the top 100 architects in the United States. In 2005, the Monterey chapter of the American Institute of Architects (AIA) honored Muennig.

== Death and legacy ==
Muennig died at his home in Big Sur on June 10, 2021, at the age of 86. The Muennig archives are held at the University of Oklahoma, American School of Architecture Archive.

== Works ==
- 1963 – Foulke House, Redings Mill, Missouri
- 1966 – Mineral Museum, 504 S Schifferdecker Avenue, Joplin, Missouri
- 1971 – Partington Ridge, 50854 Partington Ridge Road, Big Sur, California; Muenning's long-time residency
- 1972 – Kelm Residence, Big Sur, California
- 1975 – Prussin Residence, Big Sur, California (destroyed by fire)
- 1977 – John Psyllos Residence I, 46308 Pfeiffer Ridge Road, Big Sur, California
- 1978 – John Psyllos Residence II, Big Sur, California
- 1981 – Bradford Residence, Big Sur, California
- 1983 – Michel Petrucciani Residence, Big Sur, California
- 1984 – Bazinet Residence, Big Sur, California (destroyed by fire, 12/2013)
- 1985 – Partington Ridge, Muenning residence addition, 50854 Partington Ridge Road, Big Sur, California
- 1985 – Hawthrone Residence Addition, Big Sur, California
- 1988 – Witt Residence, Big Sur, California
- 1988 – Post Ranch Inn, Big Sur, California
- 1990 – Hunt-Badiner Residence remodel and addition, Big Sur, California,
- 1992 – Witt Studio/Guesthouse, designed for Paul Junger Witt, Big Sur, California
- 1993 – Lihu Lake Hotels (remodel), Wuxi, China
- 1993 – McDade Residence, Big Sur, California
- 1994 – Caddell Residence Remodel, Big Sur, California
- 1994 – Simon Residence, Big Sur, California
- 1995 – Hawthrone Gallery, 48485 Highway 1, Big Sur, California
- 1995 – Partington Point House (renovation by Muennig), Big Sur, California
- 1997 – William Barklie Henry Barn and Music Studio, Big Sur, California
- 1998 – Esalen Institute Baths, Big Sur, California
- 1998 – Pavey Residence, 46400 Clear Ridge Road, Big Sur, California
- 1998 – Petrovsky Residence, Prescott, Arizona
- 1998 – Scharffenberger Residence (also known as Terra Mar House), 48720 Highway 1, Big Sur, California
- 1998 – Nusbaum Residence, 48673 Highway 1, Big Sur, California
- Tower House (also known as Hummingbird House), Big Sur (burned down in 2013)

== See also ==
- Big Sur Coast Highway
- Lloyd Kahn
- Peter Muennig
