= Carmichael House (Pulaski County, Arkansas) =

Historic house in Arkansas, United States

- U.S. National Register of Historic Places
- Location within Arkansas Location within the United States
- Location: 13905 Arch Street Pike, Landmark, Arkansas
- Coordinates: 34°37′27″N 92°18′49″W
- Area: 6.5 acres (2.6 ha)
- Built: c. 1935
- Built by: Frank Carmean
- Architectural style: Craftsman
- NRHP reference No.: 100002478
- Added to NRHP: May 24, 2018

The Carmichael House is a historic house at 13905 Arch Street Pike in Landmark, Arkansas, United States. The property is a 30-acre (12 ha) gentleman farmer's estate, with a main house, barn, hog shed, and other farm outbuildings. The principal structures are built out of stone, with the house having terra cotta tile elements as well. It is American Craftsman in style, with a shallow pitch gable roof that has deep eaves and exposed rafters.

== Early history ==
Judge John Hugh Carmichael was born on February 2, 1868, in Cairo, Illinois. His parents were Isaac Carmichael, a former Union army sergeant, and Minerva Beck, originally from Georgia. He was a prominent Little Rock attorney, politician, and judge, who served as the dean of the Arkansas Law School (now known as the University of Arkansas at Little Rock William H. Bowen School of Law) from 1898 to 1950. During this time, Carmichael served as co-counsel on several cases with renowned Black attorney, Scipio Africanus Jones. He was first married to Amelia Parker from 1893 until her death in 1931. They had four children. The Carmichael House was built after his second marriage.

Carmichael built the main house of the property in the mid-1930s. The interior is decorated in a mix of art deco and American craftsman styles. Oral history indicates a "jail" was located on the property to house convicts that contributed labor to build the home and farm outbuildings. The jail structure burned after a lightning strike in 1980, but the metal door remains in storage on the property. The property consists of twelve structures original to the 1930s. A structure known as the "slave house" was pre-existing on the property prior to Carmichael owning the property, dated circa 1840.

The estate was sold by Carmichael's second wife and fellow attorney, Lily Mae Beauchamp, in 1958. Several owners kept the property for around a year before selling to the next owners. The Hodge family bought it for $1.9 million in 1969, and it remains with the Hodge family today. A secondary ranch-style house was built in 1971 and is not considered a contributing structure for the NRHP designation.

The house was listed on the National Register of Historic Places in 2018.

== See also ==
- National Register of Historic Places listings in Pulaski County, Arkansas
