= Sheboygan Armory =

Former auditorium in Sheboygan, Wisconsin

Sheboygan Municipal Auditorium and Armory
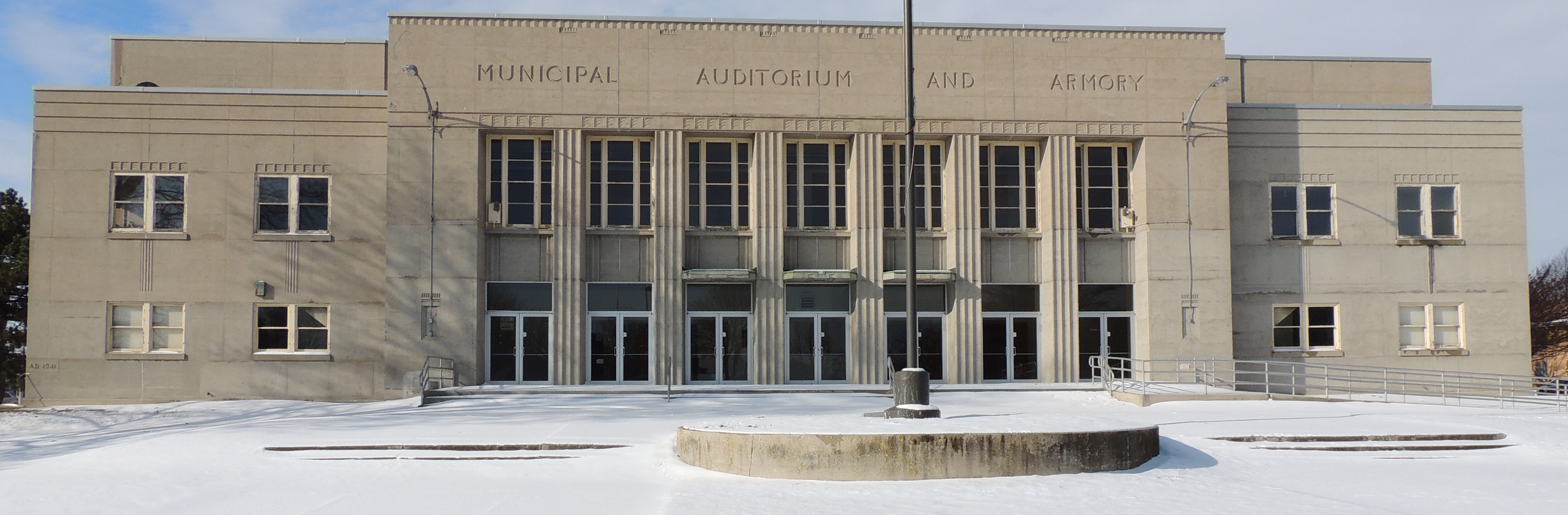

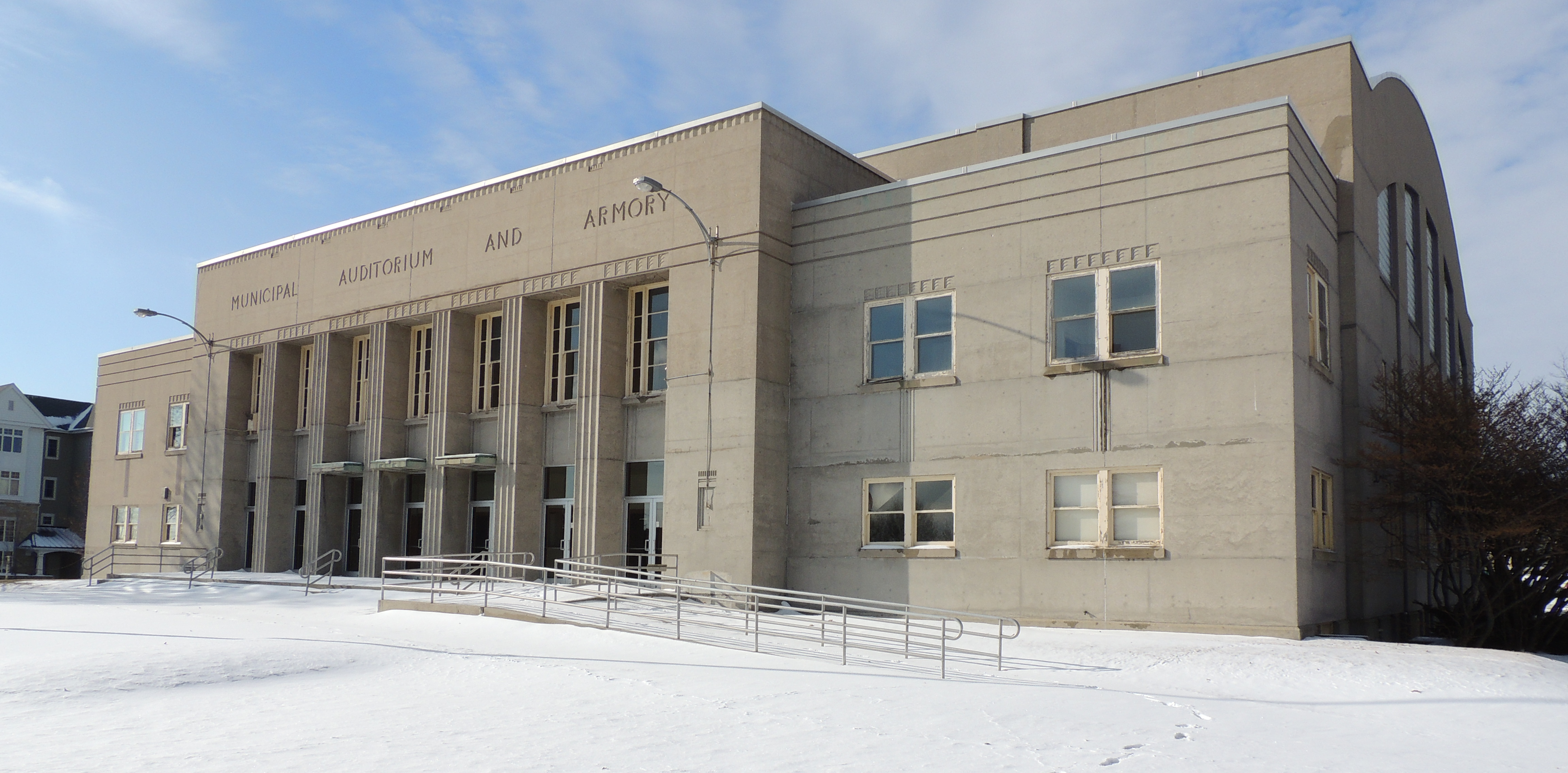
- Interactive map of the Sheboygan Municipal Auditorium and Armory area
- Former names: Sheboygan National Guard Armory and Auditorium
- Alternative names: Sheboygan Armory

General information
- Status: Demolished
- Type: Auditorium and National Guard Armory
- Architectural style: Streamline Moderne
- Location: 516 Broughton Drive; Sheboygan, Wisconsin 53081, United States
- Coordinates: 43°45′01″N 87°42′19″W
- Construction started: January 1941
- Completed: May 22, 1942
- Inaugurated: July 4, 1942
- Demolished: July–November 2020
- Cost: $204,000
- Owner: City of Sheboygan

Technical details
- Floor count: 3

Design and construction
- Architect: Edgar A. Stubenrauch
- Main contractor: Works Progress Administration

Other information
- Seating capacity: Basketball: 3,160; Wrestling: 3,690; Concerts: 3,680

Website
- www.sheboyganarmory.org

Sheboygan Municipal Auditorium and Armory (commonly known as the Sheboygan Armory) was a 52,000 sq. ft indoor arena located on the lakefront in Sheboygan, Wisconsin. It was built in Streamline Moderne style in 1941 as a Works Progress Administration project. The building seated 3,974 with permanent balcony seating and bleacher seating on the floor level. It was listed on the National Register of Historic Places in 2019. It was razed in 2020.

== History ==
The Sheboygan Armory was designed by Sheboygan architect Edgar Stubenrauch and built in 1941 as a Works Progress Administration (WPA) project. The WPA was an organization created by an executive order by President Franklin D. Roosevelt in 1935. The Sheboygan Armory, the Sheboygan County Courthouse, the city's main post office, Farnsworth Jr. High/Middle School and the original Sheboygan North High School building (now Urban Middle School) were a part of the 116,000 buildings that were built by WPA.

The Armory was built on a former lumberyard of the Freyberg Lumber Co. owned by the Freyberg Novelty Furniture Company with an adjacent factory south of Pennsylvania Avenue and North 4th Street. However, proposed building location was once in Lake Michigan at the original mouth of the Sheboygan River. The proposed design was of reinforced concrete except for a steel bowstring truss roof. The exterior walls of the building also are concrete.

The original intended purpose of the Armory was to house Wisconsin Army National Guard's 32nd Division. The building was equipped with ammunition lockers and vaults for guns and other military equipment used by the Guard. The Armory hosted the National Basketball Association's Sheboygan Redskins from 1942 until 1951. The building was the site of high school basketball games, circuses and other local events such as blood drives, and when the city's Hmong American community began to flourish in the mid-1980s, became the site of Hmong New Year celebrations.

In August 1989, the city had plans to build a riverfront hotel. Developers had considered building a 125 to 150-room hotel along the Sheboygan River with renovation of the Armory as a conference. A study commissioned by the Sheboygan Development Corp. estimated the hotel project would require a city subsidy of about $3 million.

In 2005, the Sheboygan Development Corporation announced plans to acquire the Armory to build a $17 million Spaceport Sheboygan Space & Science Center. The project would have develop further entertainment and tourism opportunity in Sheboygan and expand the State of Wisconsin's economic position in the field of aerospace technology. Plans called for a combined large format theater and planetarium, an interactive mission control center, classrooms and learning labs, a restaurant and retail store, a satellite NASA Educator Resource Center and home of the Rockets for Schools program.

In 2006, officials announced plans to close the Armory due to costs of operating the building.

In 2010, the City of Sheboygan approved a lease 5-year lease with Great Lakes Aerospace Science and Education Center to house Spaceport Sheboygan.

In 2011, Spaceport Sheboygan opened to the public. The building was used by the Great Lakes Aerospace Science & Education Center (GLASEC) until 2013 when Spaceport Sheboygan relocated across the Sheboygan River to the city's South Pier District into the former Triple Play Fun Zone building.

In 2020, the Armory was demolished, with work starting in July and continuing into November.

== Notable events ==
The building hosted the Sheboygan Red Skins of the NBL, NBA, and NPBL from 1942 until 1951. It was the site of the cross-town basketball rivalry between Central/South High and North High from the building's opening until 2006, when both schools opened large on-campus fieldhouses that seat approximately 3,000.

Many of the events that helped shape generations of Sheboyganites were held at this venue. Local events, such as Lakeland College basketball games, Boy Scout Scout-o-Ramas, Rockets for Schools, the Hmong Festival, the Festival of Trees, the Mayor's International Festival, job fairs, and military gatherings, took place here, along with nationally known entertainment, such as All Star Wrestling, Golden Gloves boxing, the Harlem Globetrotters, Hank Williams Jr., Dr. Hook & the Medicine Show, Johnny Carson, and circuses.

== Demolition ==
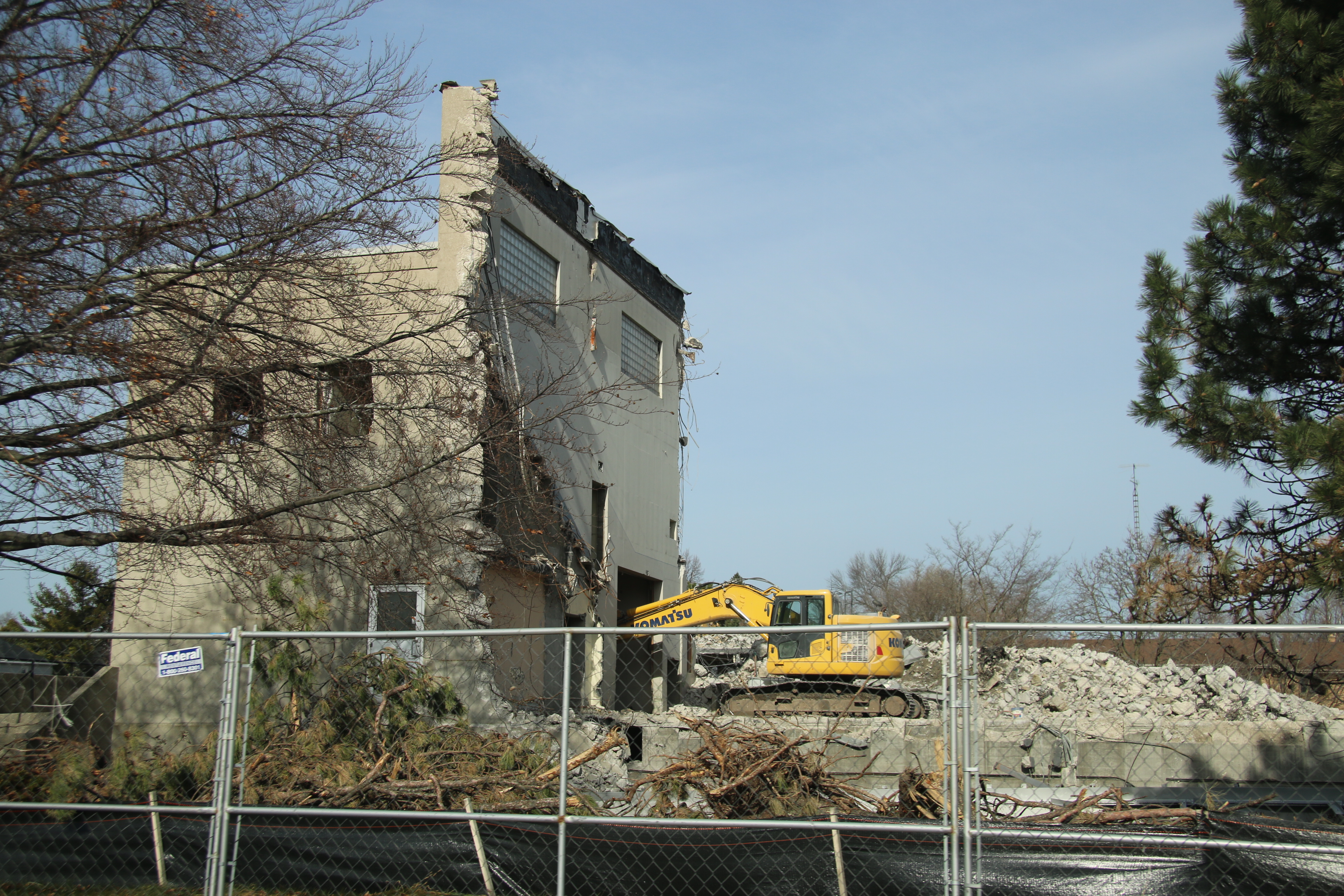
Near end of demolition in November 2020

In 2009, the Sheboygan Armory Foundation was formed to preserve the building and the group incorporated as a 501(c) non-profit organization in 2013 after plans of demolition were made public.

In January 2014, the City of Sheboygan formally requested proposals from developers to rejuvenate the Armory. Proposals for the Armory were due by October 2014. The first proposal that was public came from The Armory Foundation, which said it would partner with the city in seeking grants, donations and volunteers to help restore the building.

In December 2014, it was announced the Sheboygan Armory would likely be demolished after development plans surfaced. JD Real Estate Investment Partners submitted a proposal to the city to turn the Armory site into multi-family housing. The company confirmed the Armory would have to be demolished to make room for housing development, saying the building is "functionally obsolete" and would cost too much to refurbish for another use. However, later that month, the city announced plans to sell the Armory and the eastern portion of the surrounding land to the Sailing Education Association of Sheboygan (SEAS) for one dollar. SEAS will bulldoze the Armory by June 2015 and start construction of its headquarters on the land by April 2016. The center would be used to house and maintain sailing vessels, run SEAS administrative operations and provide educational opportunities.

In January 2015, the city's Historic Preservation and Housing Rehabilitation Commission held a joint meeting with the city's Finance Committee to decide if the Armory has enough significance that it should be preserved, putting a hold on the pending sale to SEAS. At the meeting, the committee voted 4–3 to mark the Armory as a preferred preserved significant building. As a result, there is a 90-day hold on any demolition permits for the building to give time to explore alternate preservation attempts. If no viable alternative proposals come forward during that time frame, there would be nothing to stop demolition of the building.

On March 23, 2015, the Sailing Education Association of Sheboygan announced it was scrapping plans to demolish the Armory and instead purchased the old Military Heritage Museum several blocks to the west along the Sheboygan River.

In September 2017, the City of Sheboygan requested proposals for the redevelopment of the Armory site.

In February 2018, six proposals for the redevelopment of the Armory site were shared with the public. Four proposals sought to redevelop the Armory site. Two proposals sought to repurpose the Armory building.

In April 2020, the City of Sheboygan, Sheboygan County Historical Society and Museum, and the Sheboygan County Historical Research Center had executed a memorandum of agreement with the Wisconsin State Historic Preservation Officer to allow the demolition to proceed based on the mitigation plan that included opportunities to salvage items of historic value from the Armory, production of a documentary about the Armory, and completing a survey of architectural and historical resources per National Park Service and Wisconsin Historical Society standards.

On July 13, 2020, Sheboygan Mayor Mike Vandersteen announced that the Armory would be demolished, with work beginning that week.
