= Mequon Town Hall and Fire Station Complex =

- U.S. National Register of Historic Places
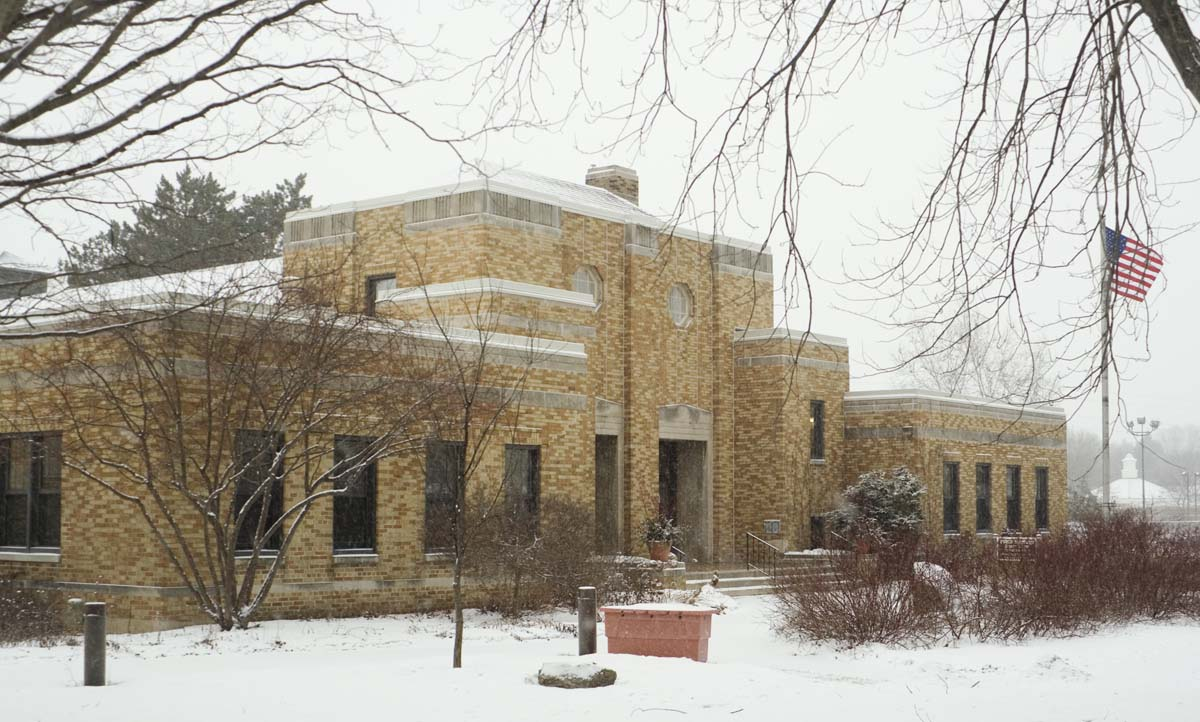

- Location within Wisconsin Location within the United States
- Location: 11333 N. Cedarburg Rd., Mequon, Wisconsin
- Coordinates: 43°13′25″N 87°59′4″W
- Built: 1937
- Architect: Satre & Senescall; Schneider & Schaefer
- Architectural style: Art Deco
- NRHP reference No.: 00000779
- Added to NRHP: July 18, 2000

Mequon Town Hall and Fire Station Complex is an Art Deco building complex in Mequon, Wisconsin, United States, that was built in 1937 as a Works Progress Administration project. It was listed on the National Register of Historic Places in 2000.

Built as a town hall in 1937, the building functioned as the city hall when Mequon incorporated in 1957. The fire department moved in the 1980s to the nearby Mequon Safety Building on at the intersection of Mequon Road and Buntrock Avenue. An additional fire station was also built on Port Washington Road, north of Mequon Road.
