= Lake View Sanatorium =

- U.S. National Register of Historic Places
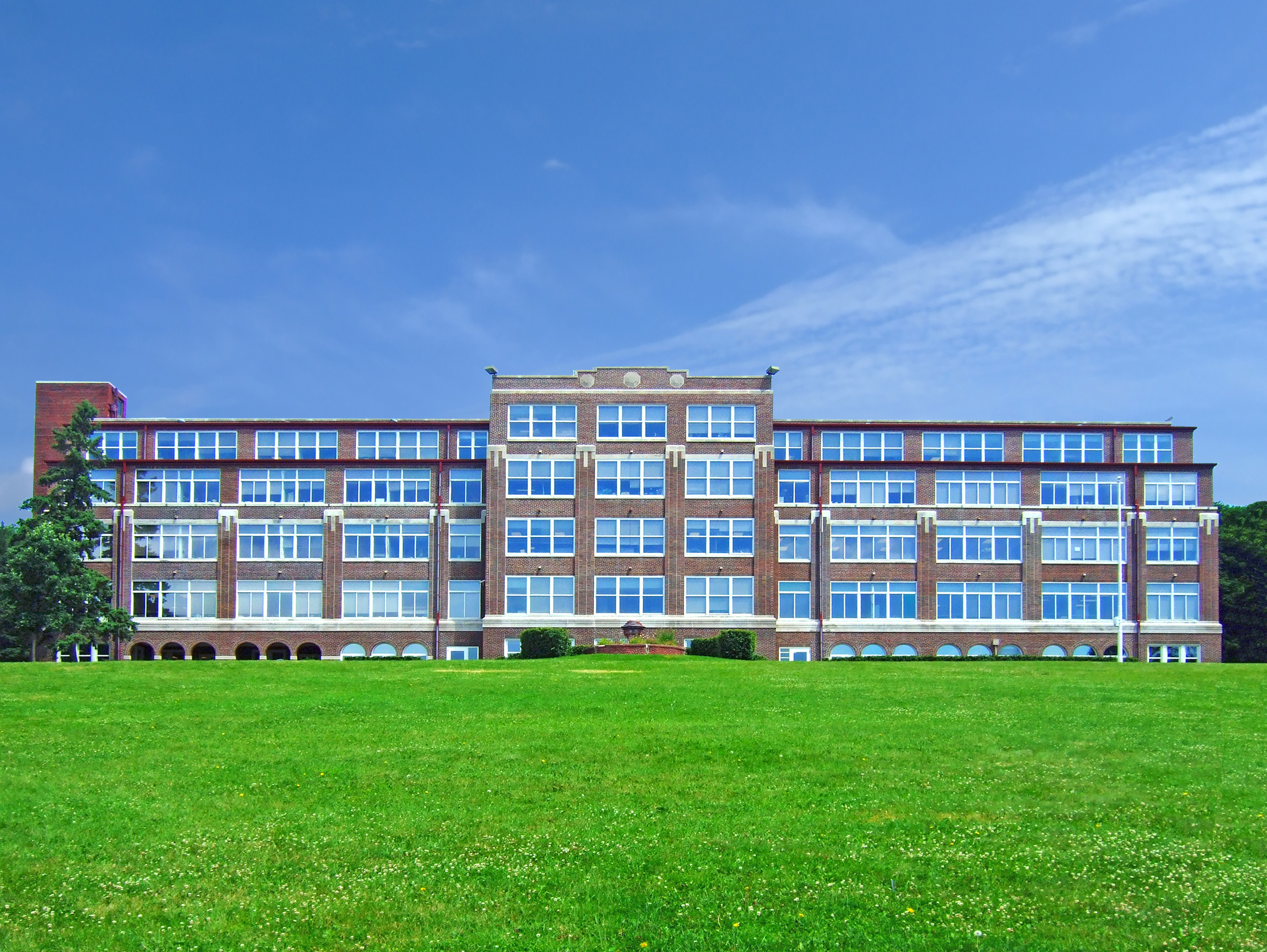

- Location within Wisconsin Location within the United States
- Location: 1204 Northport Dr., Madison, Wisconsin
- Coordinates: 43°08′18″N 89°22′29″W
- Area: 46 acres (19 ha)
- Architect: Law, Law, & Potter; E. A. Stubenrauch
- Architectural style: Art Deco
- NRHP reference No.: 93000258
- Added to NRHP: April 15, 1993

Lake View Sanatorium is a former county tuberculosis sanatorium northeast of Lake Mendota in Madison, Wisconsin. The last county sanatorium built in Wisconsin, it was considered the most advanced, with "germ traps" and open porches. In 1993 parts of the complex were added to the National Register of Historic Places.

Before the introduction of antibiotics, sanatoria were used to isolate tuberculosis patients from the general public and provide them with a supportive environment in which to recover. The state of Wisconsin had a state sanatorium supplemented by a series of county and private sanatoria. As Dane County had a large private sanatorium (Morningside, south of town), it lagged behind other counties in opening a public one, but the financial benefits of operating its own sanatorium convinced the county in the late 1920s to build Lake View Sanatorium. I.e., planners estimated it would cost $18 per week to treat a patient at a new state-of-the-art county-run sanatorium, as compared to the $25–30 it was paying for Dane County patients to be treated at Morningside and in other counties.

Lake View's main building, built 1929–1930, was designed by local architects Law, Law, & Potter with the assistance of E. A. Stubenrauch, a Milwaukee architect with experience designing sanatoriums. While the building is mainly functional, it features some Art Deco elements. The building's facilities included 125 beds for patients, an operating room, and facilities for outpatient care. Each patient room contained a "germ trap" vestibule where staff could de-gown after seeing a patient, and a door to a common porch. The building featured large porches facing the lake, as fresh air was considered the best treatment for tuberculosis at the time. The first and second floors had enclosed porches, and the third and fourth floors had open porches. Patients generally spent their days and even many nights on the porch.

In the early years the fourth floor was used to house 25 staff, which reduced the capacity for patients. By 1934 that extra capacity was needed and the Board of Supervisors approved money to build the Dormitory for Help to house staff. This construction was supported by Works Progress Administration funds, and freed up 25 beds in the main building for patients. Other ancillary buildings were added over the years: a 1929 power house, a 1938 water utility building, a 1938 water tower, a 1960 power house, and a few others.

As antibiotics made sanatoria increasingly obsolete from the 1940s onward, use of the facility declined until it closed in the 1960s; the building is now used by the Dane County Department of Human Services.

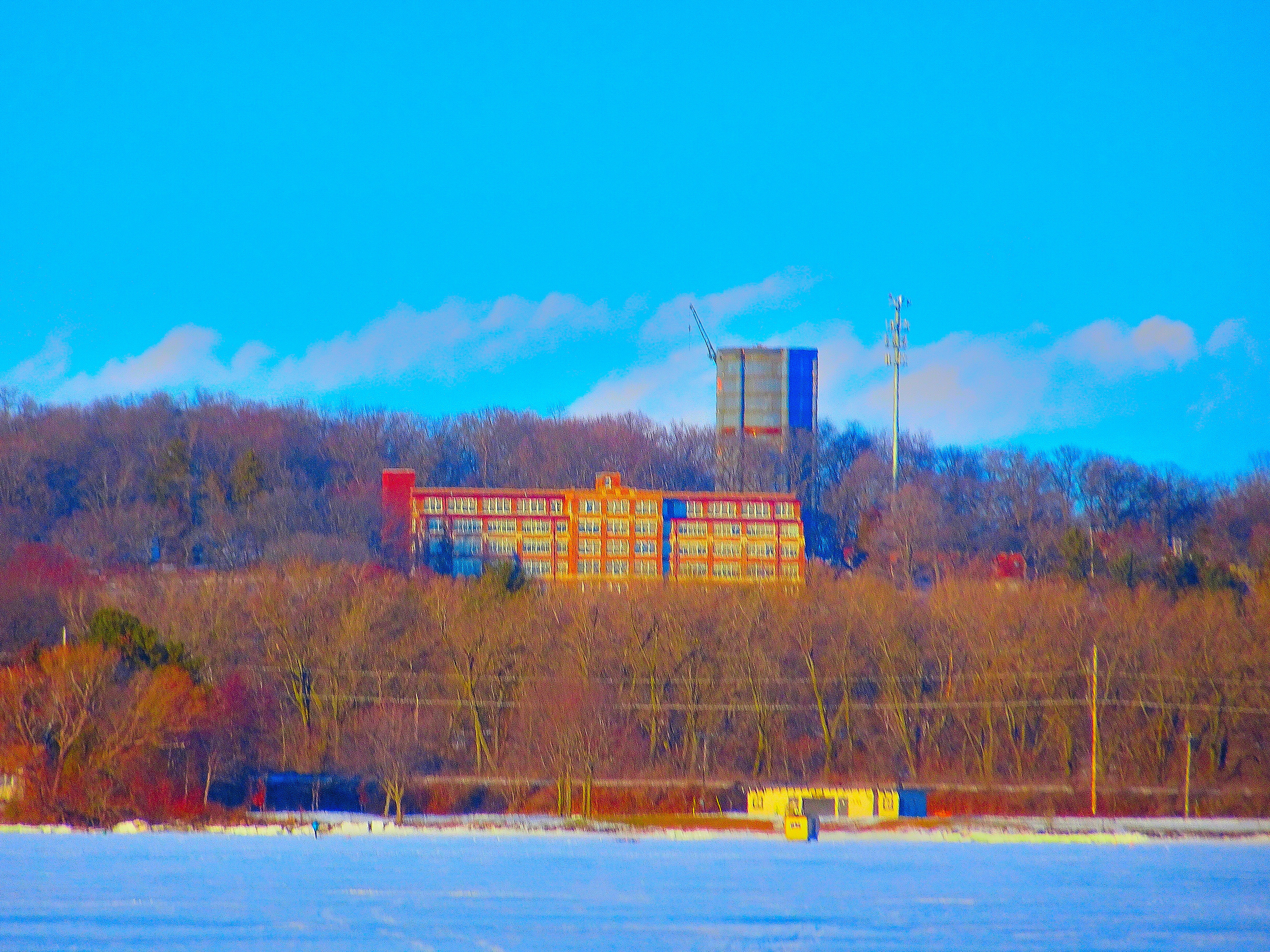
Main building

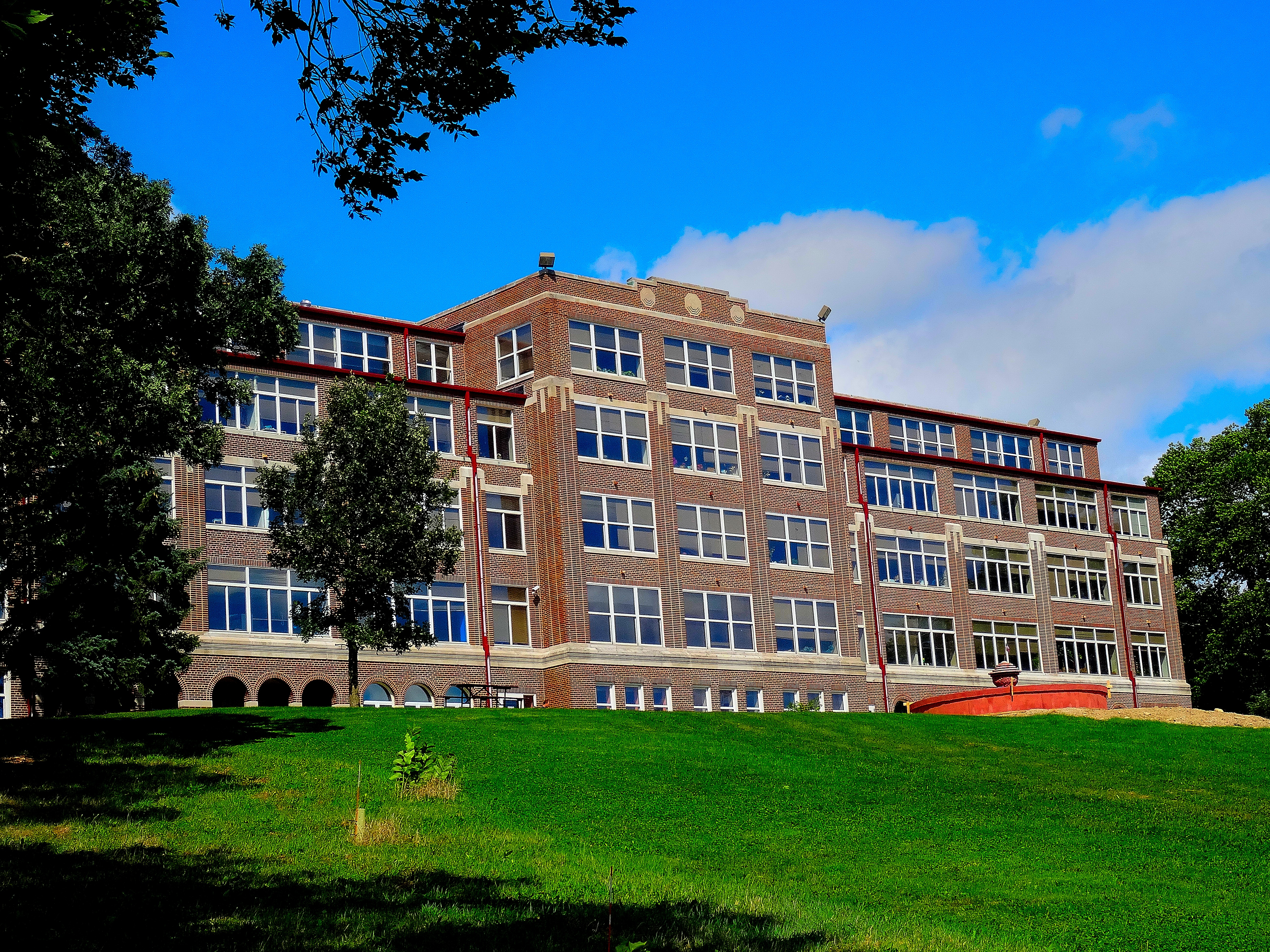

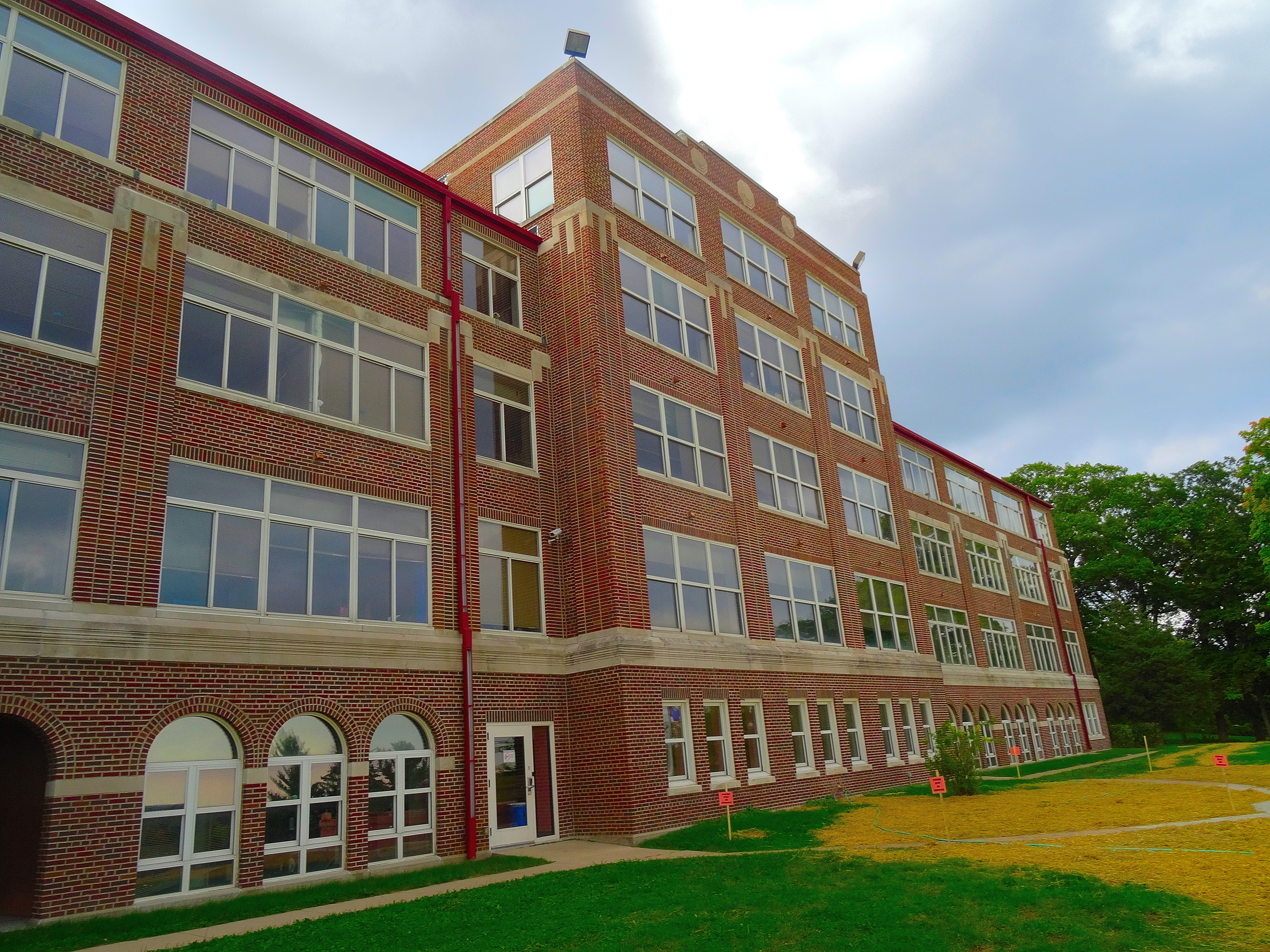

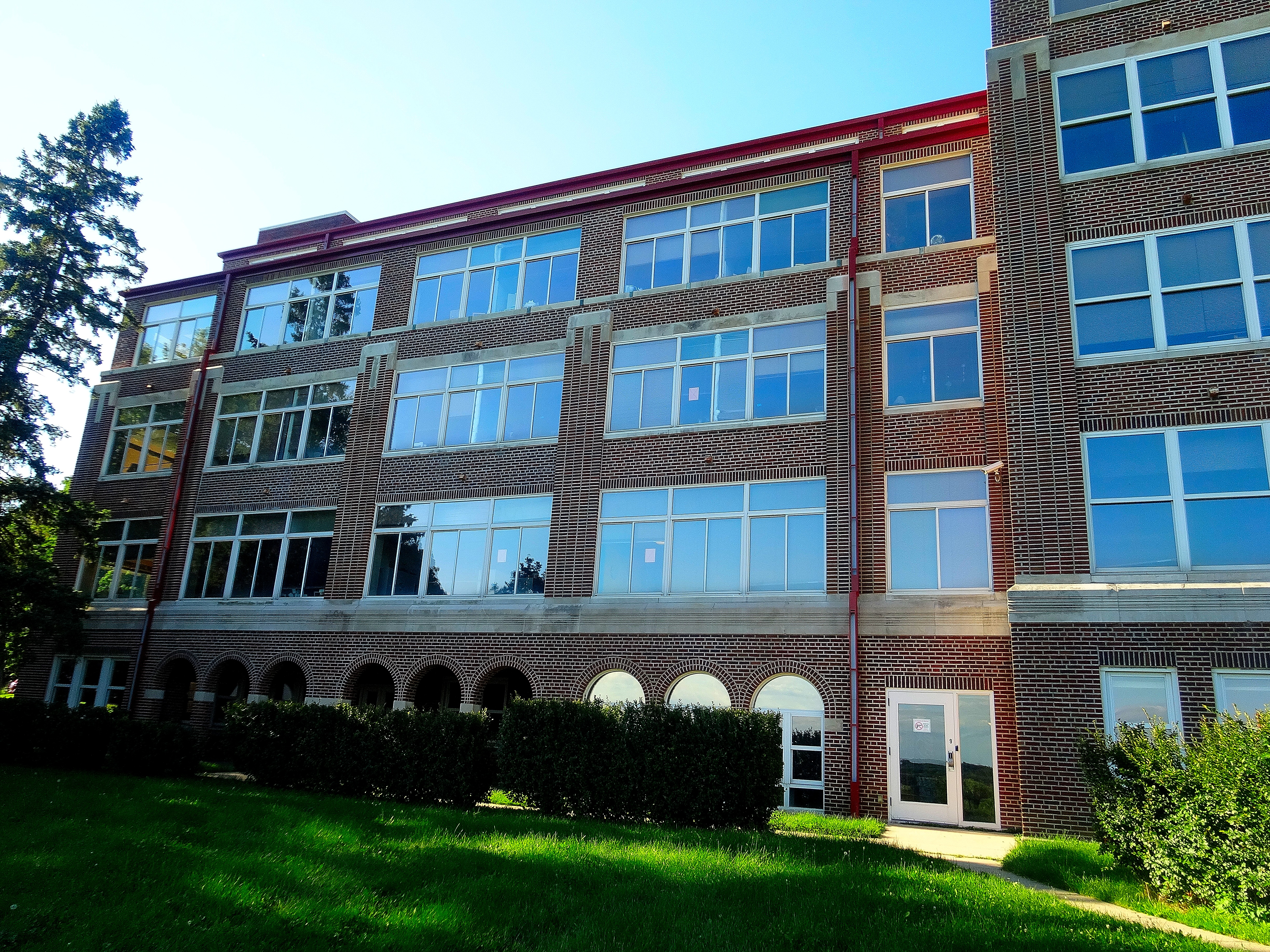

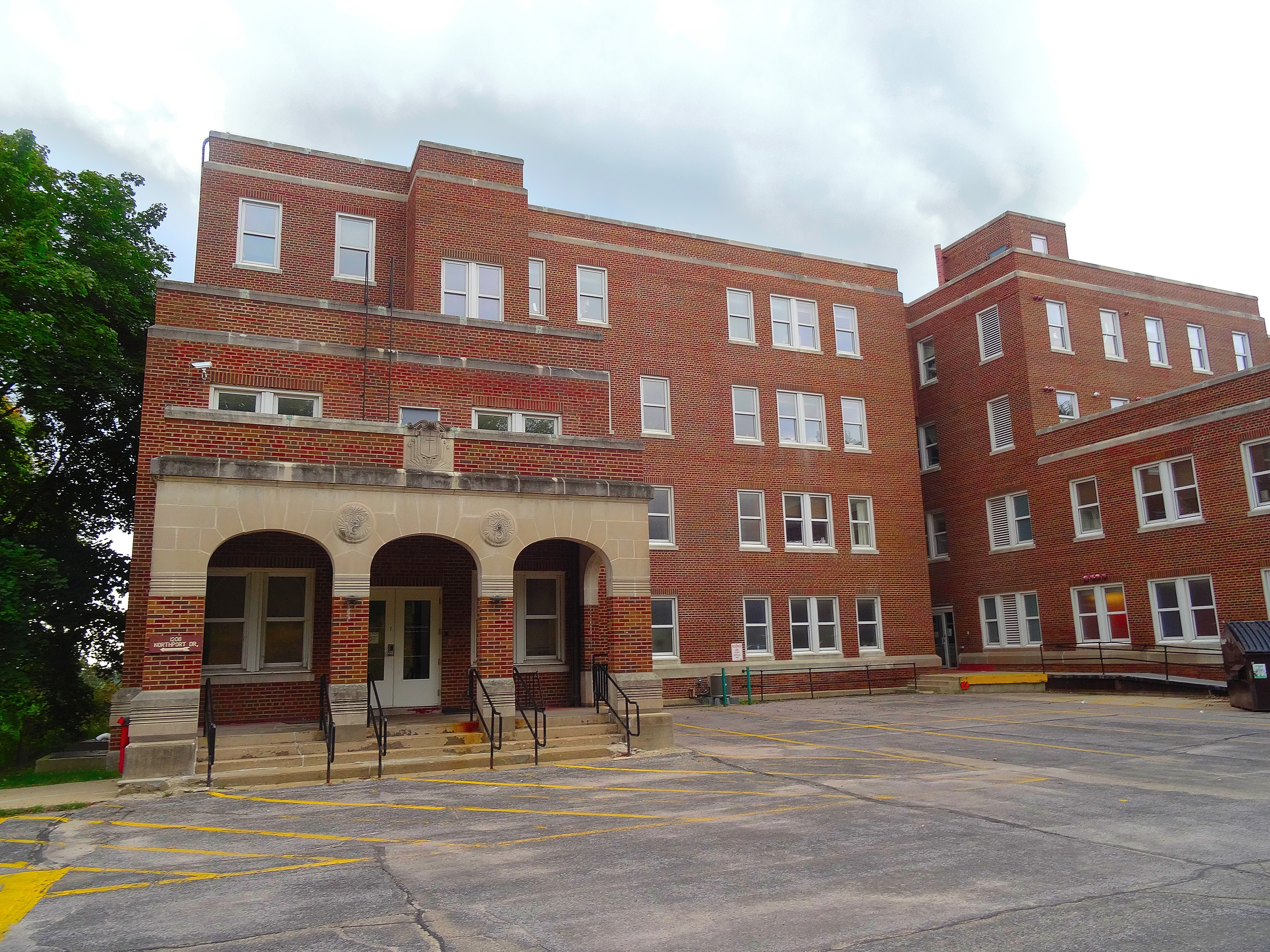

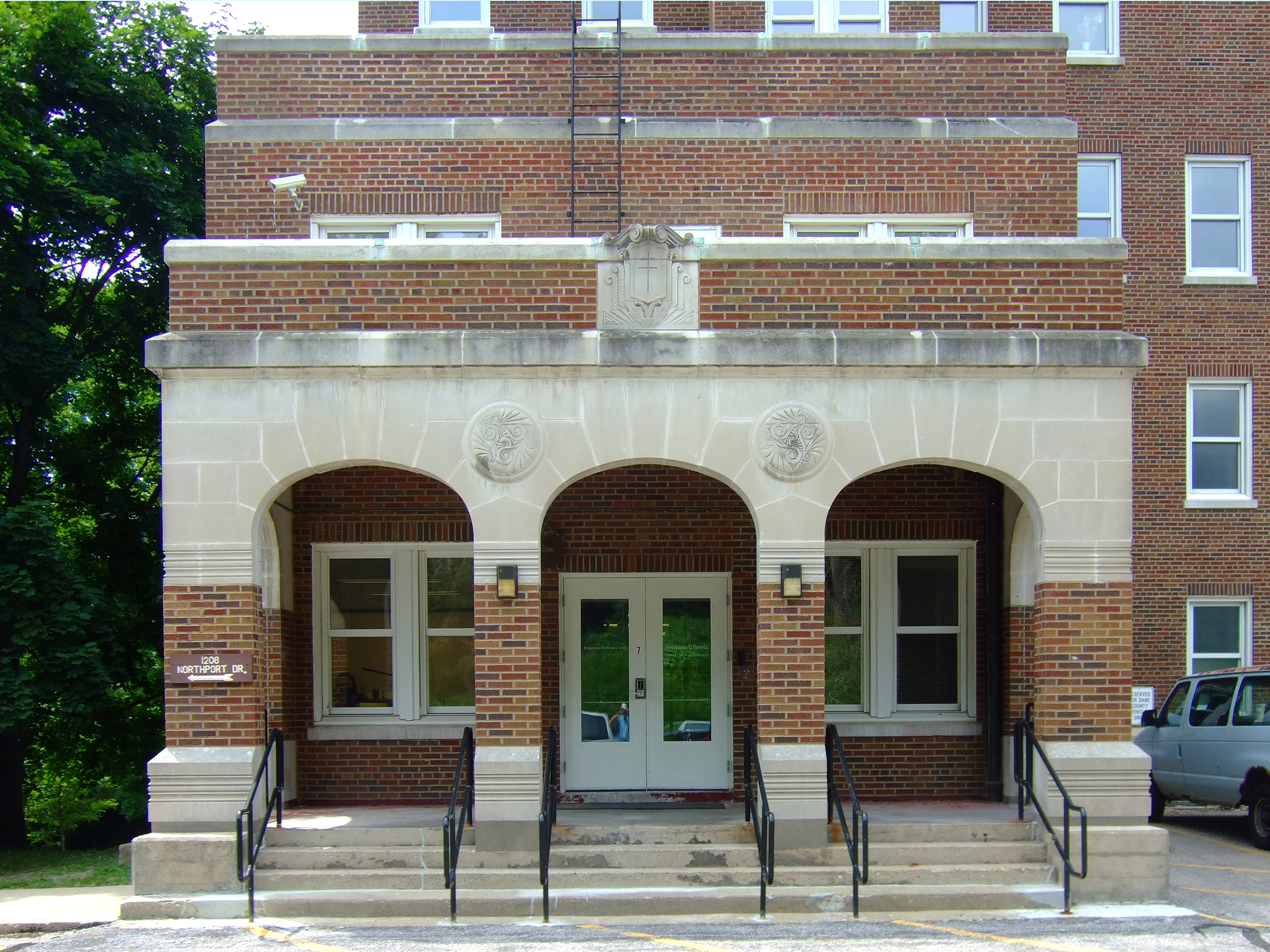
Entrance

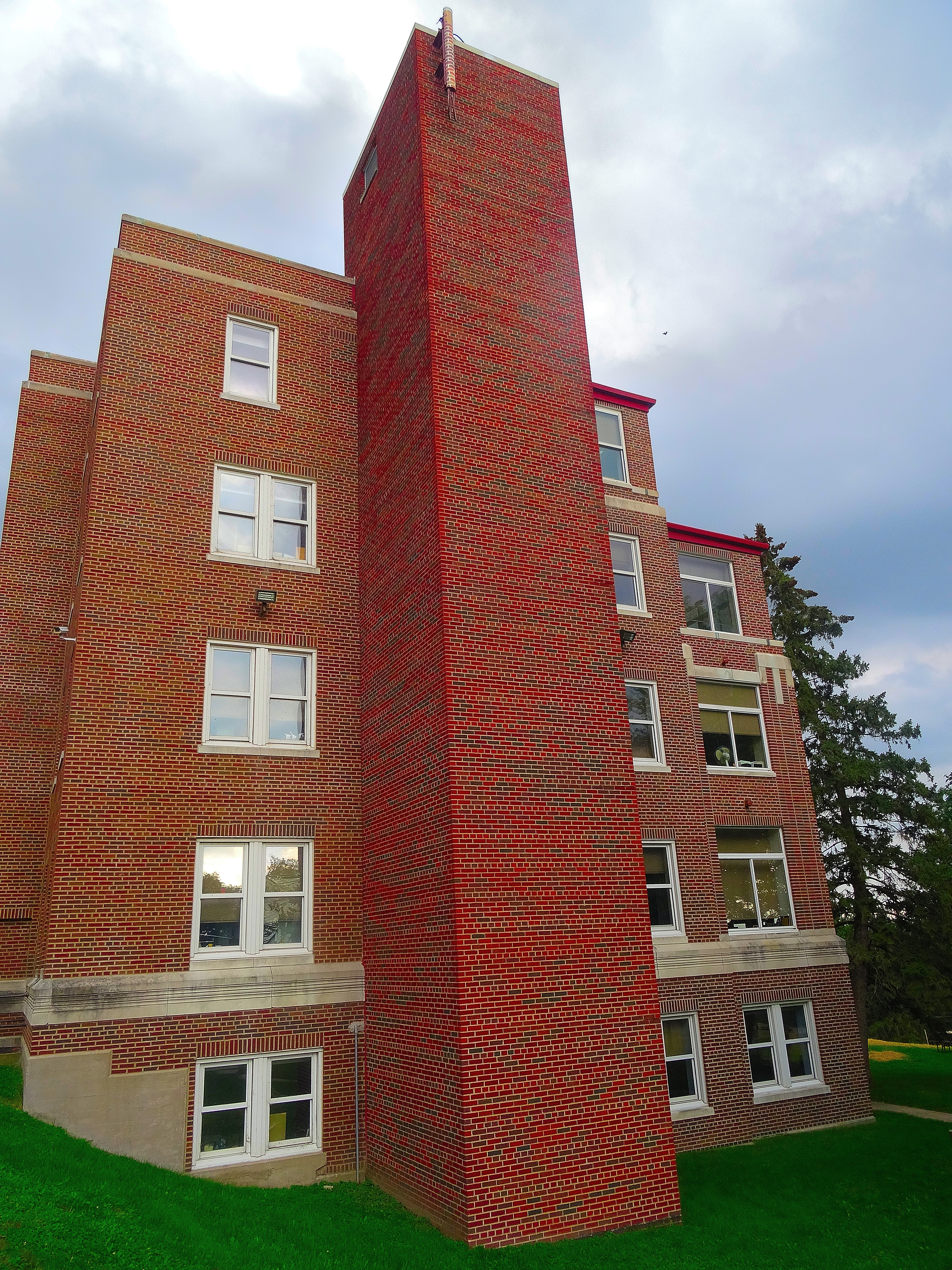

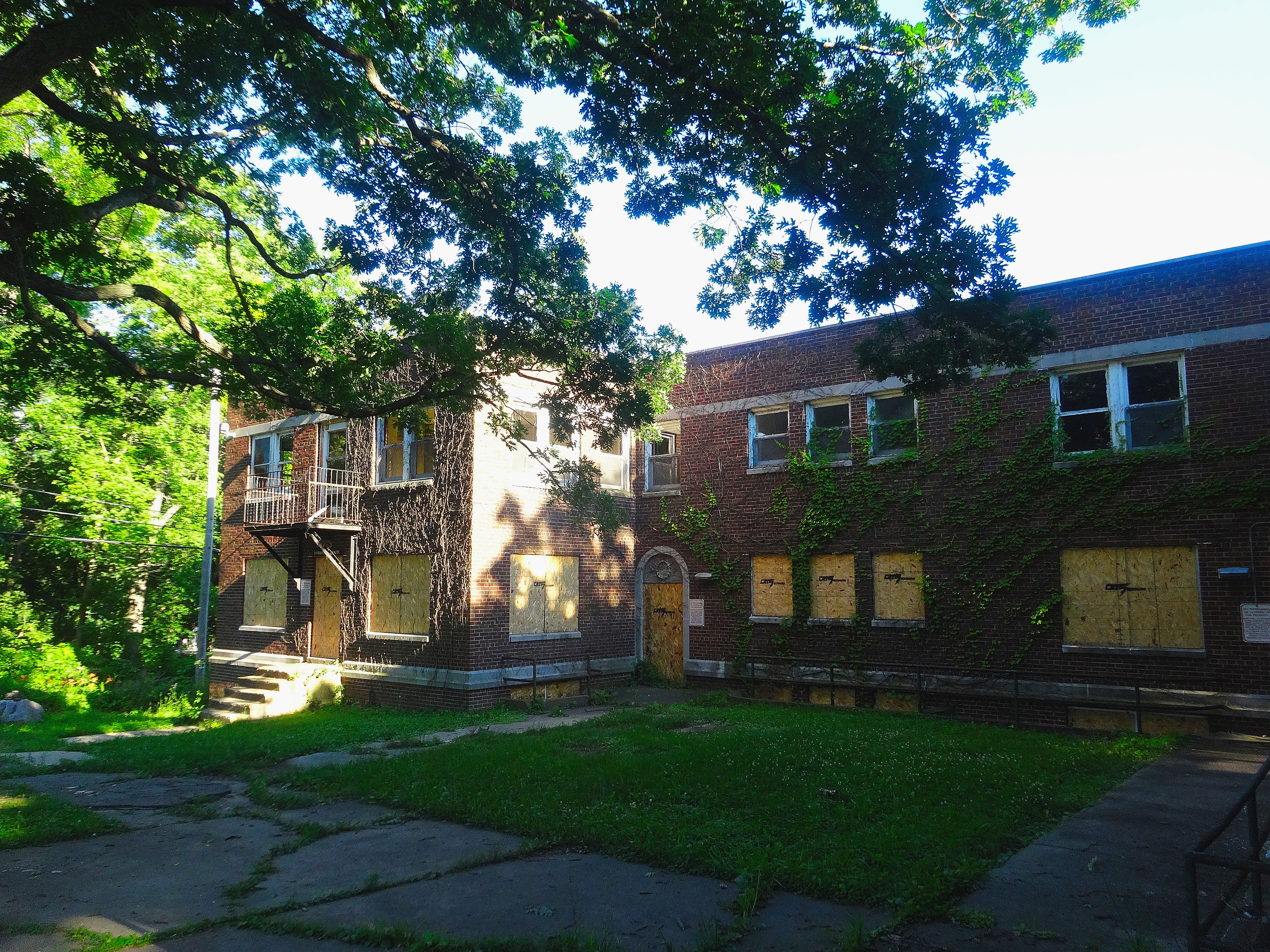
Dormitory for help

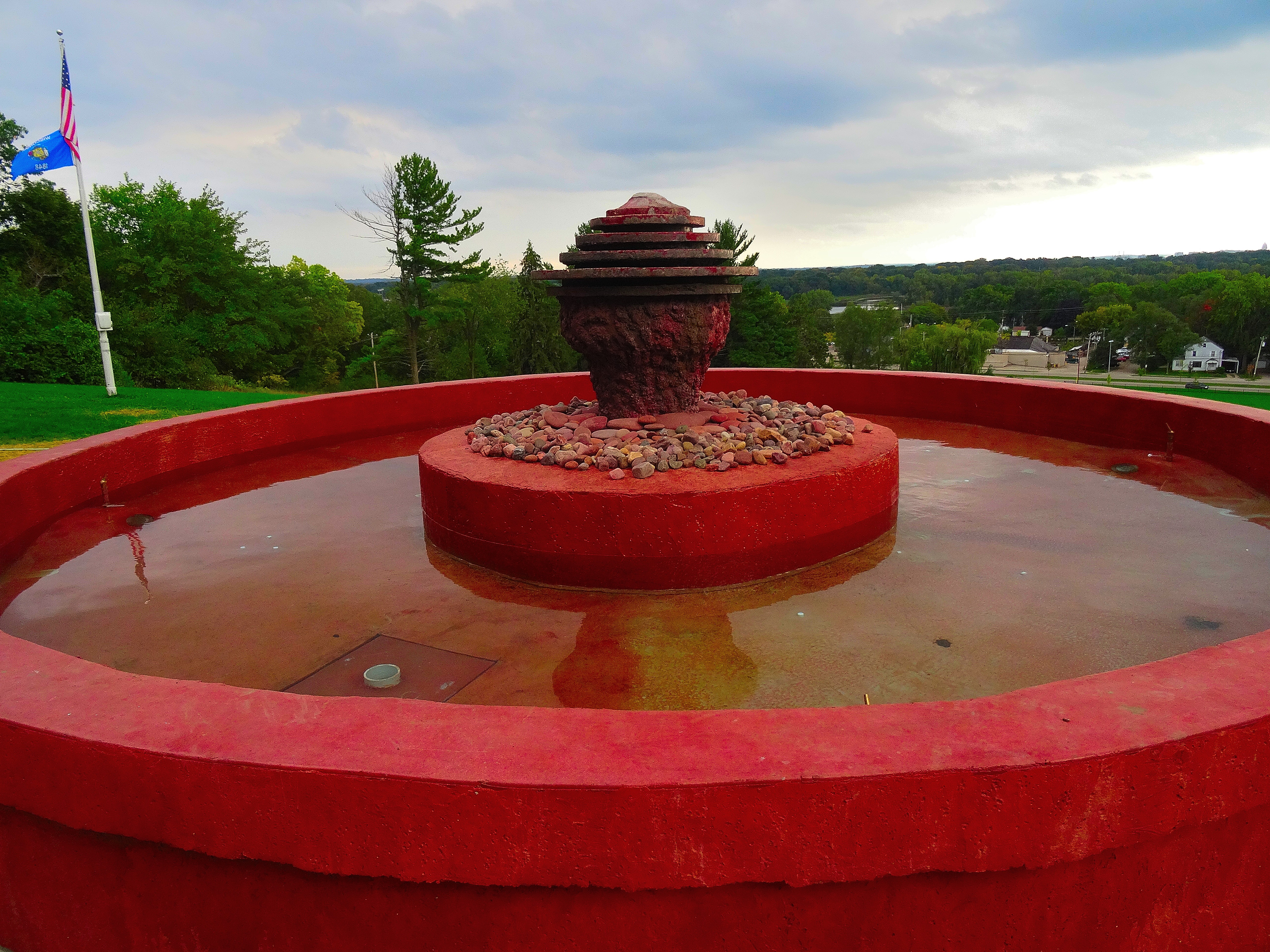
fountain
