= Cecil M. Buffalo Jr. House =

Historic house in Arkansas, United States

- U.S. National Register of Historic Places
- Location within Arkansas Location within the United States
- Location: 16324 Arch Street Pike, Landmark, Arkansas
- Coordinates: 34°38′27″N 92°18′33″W
- Area: 2 acres (0.81 ha)
- Built: 1968
- Architect: Dean Bryant Vollendorf
- Architectural style: Mid-Century Modern
- NRHP reference No.: 100002951
- Added to NRHP: September 17, 2018

The Cecil M. Buffalo Jr. House (also known as the Buffalo House) is a historic house at 16324 Arch Street Pike in Landmark, Arkansas, United States. It is a single-story semi-circular structure, finished mainly in glass and fieldstone, with some vertical board siding. The outside portion of the semi-circle is mainly finished with sliding glass doors, while the inside portion has more windows. The building is topped by a flat roof. The house was built in 1968 to a design by Oklahoma architect Dean Bryant Vollendorf, and is a good example of his "Baysweep" style.

The house was listed on the National Register of Historic Places in 2018.

== History ==
While Little Rock was the main focus for settlers in Pulaski County, areas south of the city experienced exponential growth. The Landmark community is within the Union Township that was created in 1859. There were originally approximately 400 original residents to the area before the area known as East End was annexed to Saline County in 1873. By the 1950s, the area began to boom with new residential and business developments. By 1987, Landmark had its own fire department, city utilities, and shopping center.

Cecil M. Buffalo, Jr., was born on November 28, 1944, in Little Rock to Cecil Miles Buffalo, Sr., and Melba Buffalo. The elder Buffalo worked for the Conoco Oil Company and owned several gas stations, including one in the Landmark community less than a mile from the eventual location of the Buffalo House. The younger Buffalo graduated from the University of Arkansas with a Bachelor's degree in Fine Arts, but he too would work for Conoco. The home was built and paid for by Buffalo, Sr., as a wedding present to Buffalo, Jr. and his wife. The circular design offered a continuous view of Landmark Lake. The home, along with another the Buffalo family built nearby at 15915 Pinerose Circle, gave a distinctive look to the Buffalo subdivision that attracted passers-by on Hwy 167. The living room of the home was expanded in 1977, and a swimming pool addition completed in 1982. The home was sold outside of the family in 1989 and has been sold several times since. The most recent sale was in 2013 for $190,000.

== See also ==
- National Register of Historic Places listings in Pulaski County, Arkansas
