= Waushara County Courthouse, Waushara County Sheriff's Residence and Jail =

Historic complex in Wisconsin, United States

- U.S. National Register of Historic Places
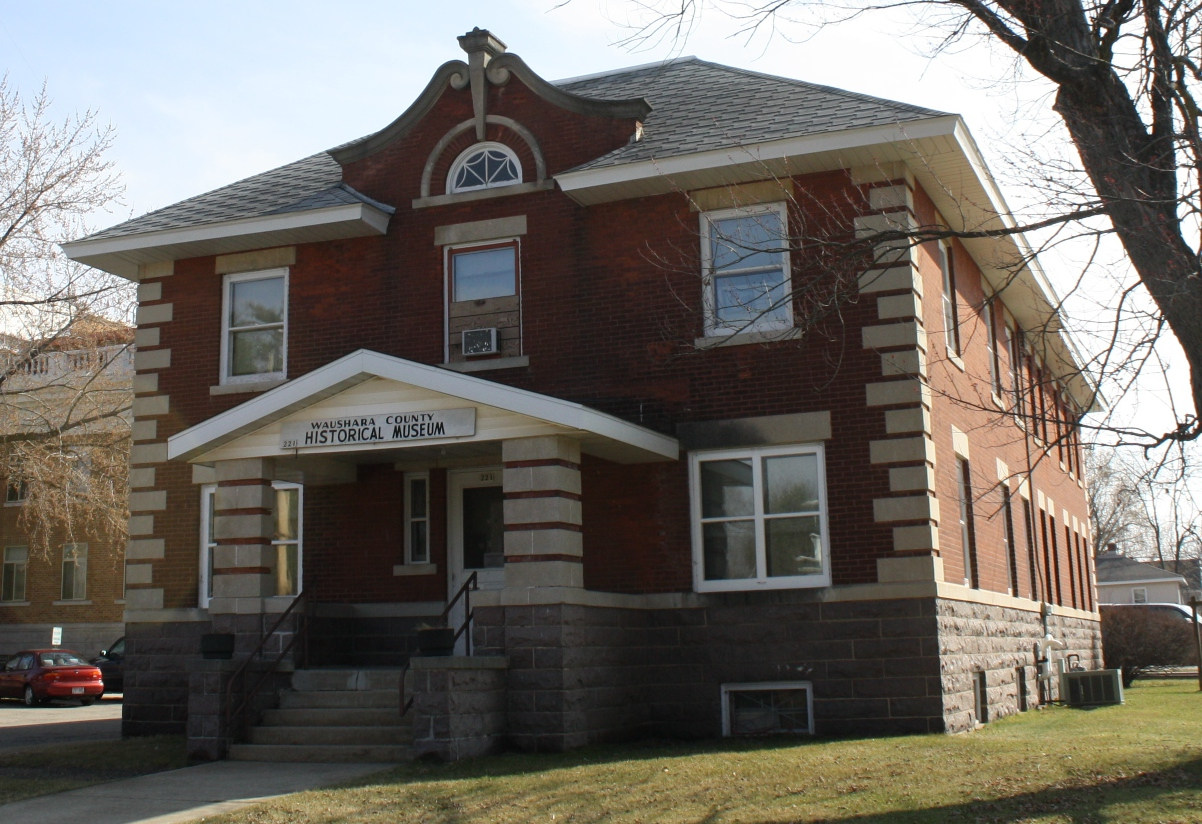
- Jail building, now used as a museum

- Location within Wisconsin Location within the United States
- Interactive map showing the location of Waushara County Courthouse, Sheriff’s Residence and Jail
- Location: 209 St. Marie St., Wautoma, Wisconsin
- Coordinates: 44°4′25″N 89°17′24″W
- Area: 1.5 acres (0.61 ha)
- Built: 1928
- Built by: Cullen, J.P. & Son
- Architects: Stubenrauch, E.A.
- Architectural style: Classical Revival, Neo-Classical
- MPS: County Courthouses of Wisconsin TR
- NRHP reference No.: 82000729
- Added to NRHP: March 9, 1982

The Waushara County Courthouse, Waushara County Sheriff's Residence and Jail is a pair of buildings in Wautoma, Wisconsin that are together listed on the U.S. National Register of Historic Places.

The Waushara County Sheriff's Residence and Jail is a brick Georgian Revival building (pictured at right) at 221 S Ste. Marie Street designed by C. H. Williams and built in 1908. The sheriff and his family lived in the front and the jail cells were in back. This building is now a museum of the Waushara County Historical Society.

The Waushara County Courthouse was a Classical Revival-style building at 209 Ste. Marie Street designed by E. A. Stubenrauch and built in 1928. The courthouse building was monumental in scale. A 1981 review of historic courthouses in the state described this courthouse, along with several others in other counties, as "Simple in both overall concept and decoration [and including] the essential Neoclassical portico and symmetrical disposition of elements at a scale befitting landmarks in their communities; that simplicity is enhanced by the evident care with which the buildings and sites are maintained.". The courthouse was demolished in May 2025.

The buildings were listed on the National Register of Historic Places in 1982.

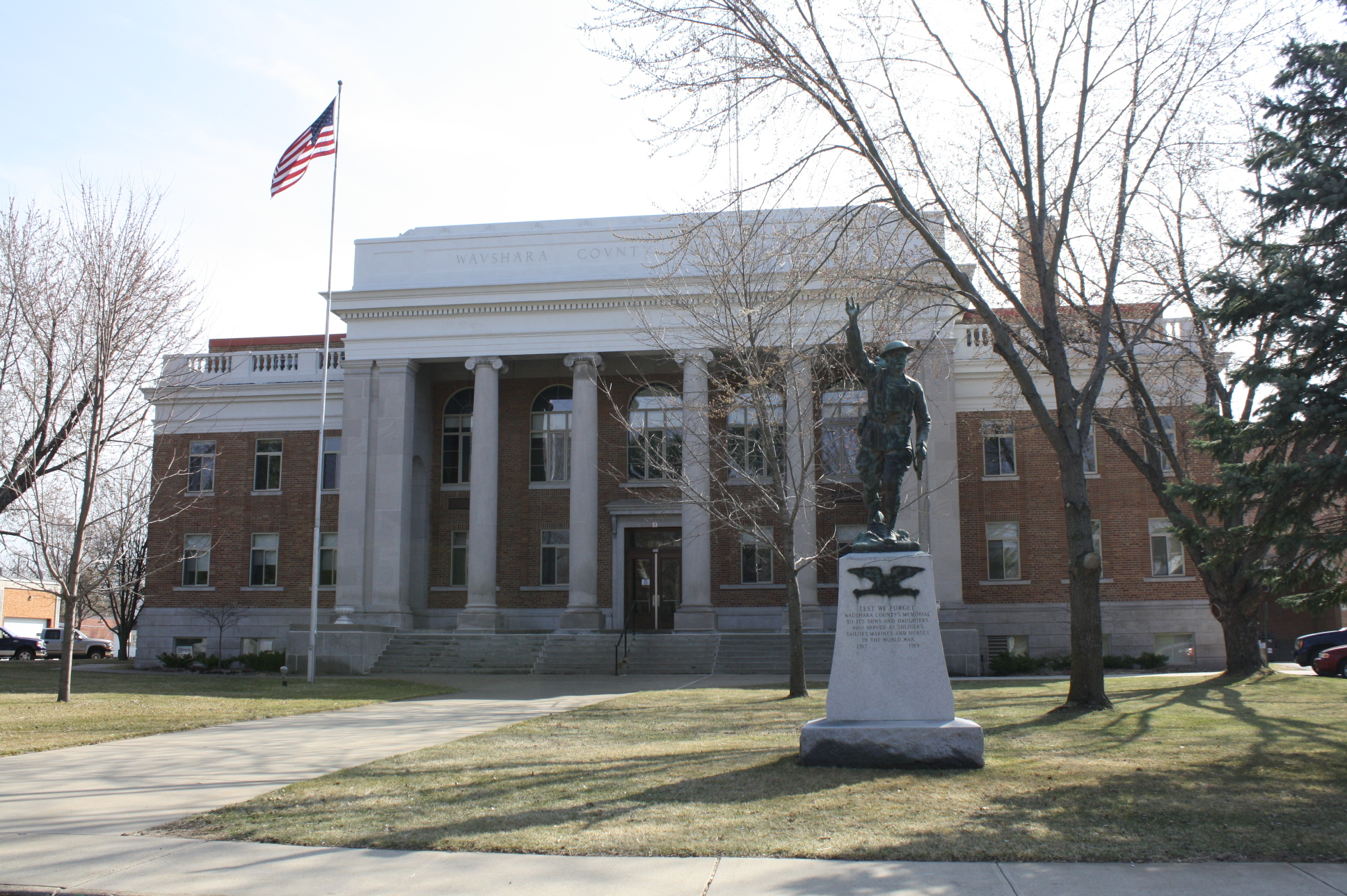
The courthouse
