= Herb Greene (architect) =

American architect and artist

- Born: Herbert Ronald Greenberg; 1929 (age 96–97); Oneonta, New York, U.S.
- Occupation: Architect
- Website: www.herbgreene.org

Herb Greene, (née Herbert Ronald Greenberg, born 1929) is an American architect, artist, author and educator. Greene's architecture practice was based in Kentucky, Oklahoma and Texas. His built projects are known for an original interpretation of organic design.

== Biography ==
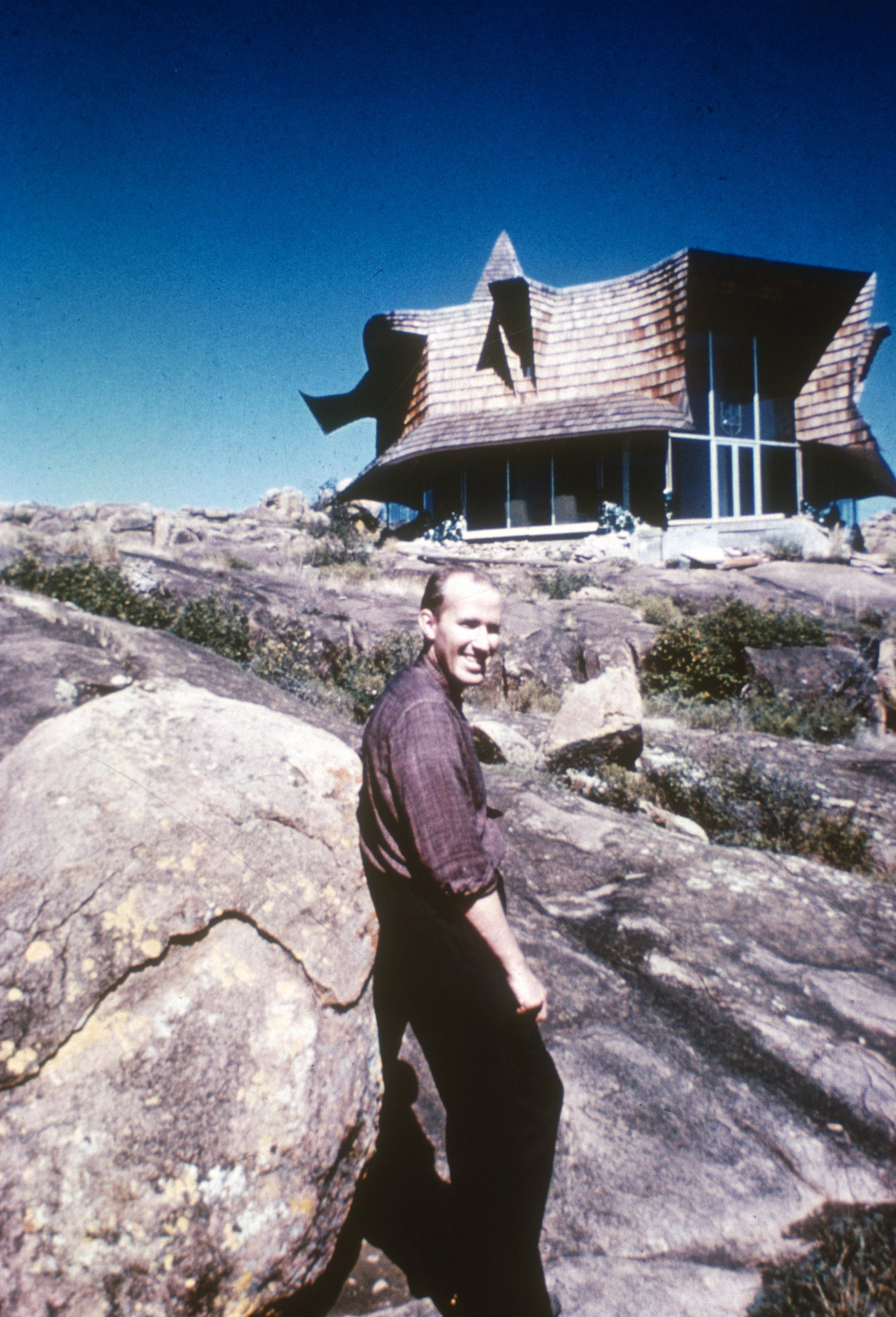
Herb Greene, Snyder, Oklahoma, 1961. Photo by Robert Alan Bowlby.

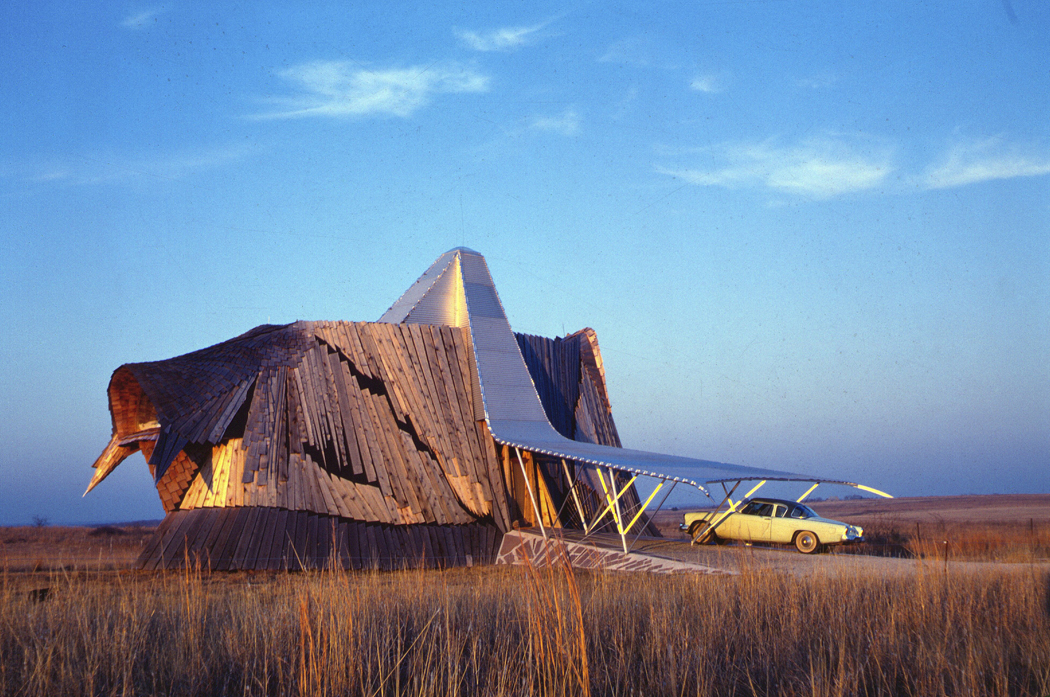
Prairie House designed by Herb Greene. Photo by Robert Alan Bowlby.

Herbert Ronald Greenberg was born in 1929 in Oneonta, New York. Greene left Syracuse University in New York in 1948 to enroll at the University of Oklahoma, where he studied under the direction of Bruce Goff, a modernist architect known for his iconoclastic design philosophy. While earning his degree and after, Greene worked for Goff, preparing architectural drawings, which are now included in The Art Institute of Chicago, Archival Collection.

During 1951 to 1954 Greene worked for John Lautner in Los Angeles, California and then relocated to Houston, Texas, where he worked for Joseph Krakower and established his own practice.

In 1957, Greene returned to the University of Oklahoma, where he and his colleagues, Bruce Goff and Mendel Glickman (1895–1967), among other faculty, developed the American School of architecture, a curriculum that emphasized individual creativity, organic forms, and experimentation. Donald MacDonald, an architect who trained under Greene and Glickman, described the American School as “a truly American ethic, which is being formulated without the usual influence of the European or Asian architectural forms and methodologies common on the East and West coasts of the United States.” Students were taught to look to sources beyond the accepted canon of western architecture and to find inspiration in everyday objects, the natural landscape, and non-western cultures such as the designs of Native American tribes of Oklahoma and the Western plains. Mickey Muennig was one of Greene's students.

Greene realized the completion of his building, The Prairie House, in 1961, a structure that pre-dated the green building movement by a decade. Located in Norman, Oklahoma, this modernist residence, integrates concepts that are now associated with smart architecture: natural materials, passive design, natural lighting and ventilation, energy efficiency, and careful site placement. Julius Shulman photographs of The Prairie House were featured in Life and Look magazines, in addition to several international publications. This media exposure brought Greene recognition for his experimental architecture and counter-culture design philosophy.

In 1964 Greene left Oklahoma to become a professor of architecture at the University of Kentucky, where he taught for 18 years and designed buildings that reflected client-centered regional architecture. Greene believed that dialogue between the architect and client was paramount to creating a design that both could support. He subscribed to the philosophy that ultimately the users and clients needed to make buildings their own. He did this through the integration of regional and historical references and by incorporating the client's personal objects into a meaningful relationship with the actual design such as in the Joyce Residence.

Greene has lived in Berkeley, California, since 1982, where he continues to explore the interdisciplinary realm of architecture, art, science and philosophy. He is a published author, on the subject of visual perception and neurobiological systems. Greene's work as an artist, architect and writer explores symbolic relationships between memory, experience, object and environment.

== Legacy ==
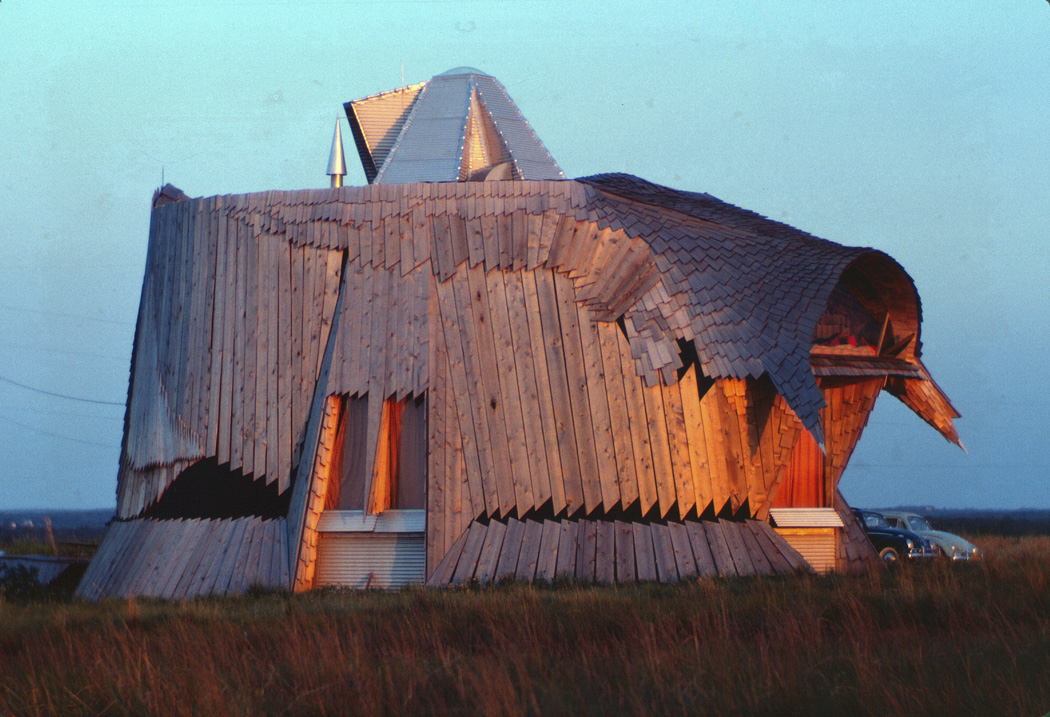
Prairie House, 1961 designed by Herb Greene. Photo by Robert Alan Bowlby.

Greene carried forward the American School legacy in his projects throughout the Great Plains area and Kentucky, focusing on contextual relationships to site and climate with an experimental and resourceful consideration of materials. Like his mentors, Greene strives for an individual solution to problem solving, stressing the particular over the general, however his fascination with the role of architectural symbols as a means of expanding individual expression, is an approach that is unique to his personal architecture practice.

Greene's work is known for original concepts, organic design characteristics and connections to landscape. His architectural drawings are in The Art Institute of Chicago's archival collection alongside work by Louis Sullivan, Frank Lloyd Wright , Bruce Goff and others associated with the “Prairie Tradition”.

Greene's architectural work has been included in exhibitions throughout the United States, including "Modern Architecture USA", 1965, Museum of Modern Art, NY; "Environmental Architecture", 1967, Kansas City Art Institute, MI; "An American Architecture",1977, Milwaukee Art Center, WI; "The Continuous Present of Organic Architecture",1991, Cincinnati Contemporary Arts Center, OH; and "Time Space Existence", 2018, Venice Architecture Biennale, University of Oklahoma installation in Palazzo Bembo, Italy.

On April 30, 1956, Herb Green (sic) was mentioned in Charles Schultz's Peanuts cartoon. Charlie Brown mentions to Lucy the grass will be turning green soon. Lucy questions which green. She goes and mentions 14 varieties of green before she ends off with Herb Green or Graham Greene?

== Art practice and influences ==
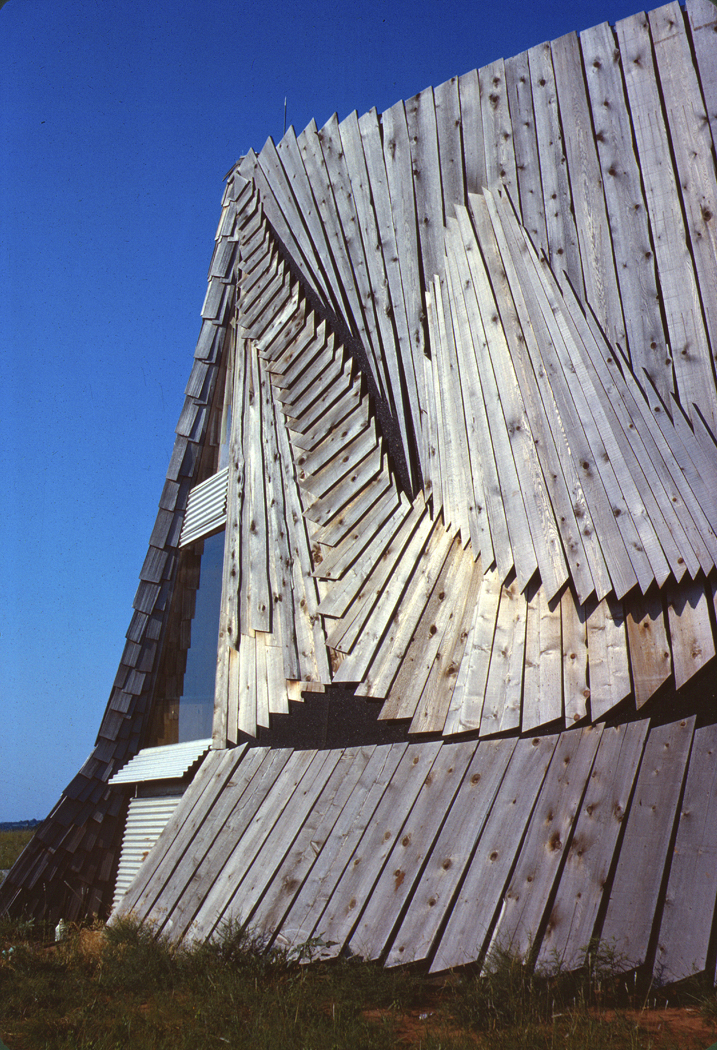
Detail of Prairie House exterior. Photo by Robert Alan Bowlby.

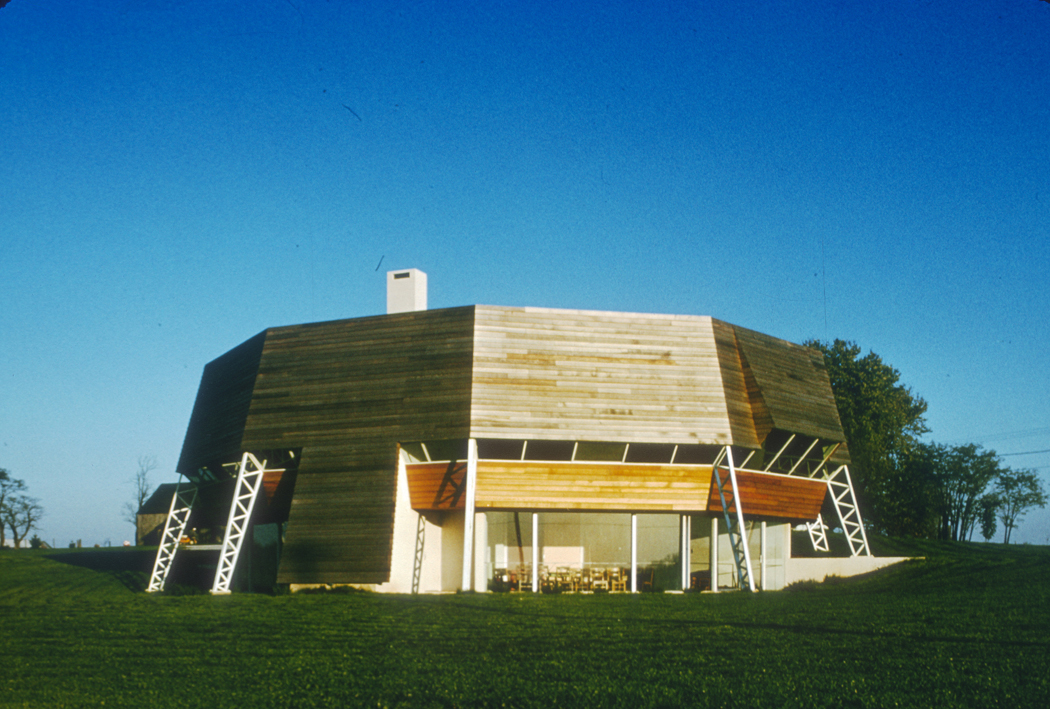
Unitarian Church in Lexington. Designed by Herb Greene, 1965. Photo by Robert Alan Bowlby.

Greene's visual art practice spans six decades. His work investigates ways in which an event is represented in the mind and how associative meaning evolves into other states of perception. Central to this concept, which Greene derived from Alfred North Whitehead, is the notion that objects are not static entities and have multiple aspects that are apparent by various cues that can be measured against our own biological constructs that form emotional and intellectual experiences. Greene's other influences include the philosophical views of Gertrude Stein (1874-1946), George Lakoff (1941) and Mark Johnson (1949). His paintings are in private collections across the United States and in the permanent collection of The Art Institute of Chicago.

In 1962 the Oklahoma City Art Museum presented the first exhibition of Greene's paintings. Later exhibitions include the Illinois Biennial, 1965, Krannert Art Museum, IL; Fine Arts Gallery, 1966, University of Arkansas, AR; Kovler Gallery, 1966, Chicago IL; Phoenix Gallery, 1970, NY; University of Kentucky, Fine Arts Gallery, 1974, KY; Living Arts and Science Center, 1975, KY; and The Louisville Arts Association, 1976, KY. In 1977 Greene received a National Endowment for the Arts grant.

== Selected architectural works ==
- 1954- Southwest Bell Offices, Houston, Texas
- 1957 – The Julius (Jules) and Terry Salzman House, Houston, Texas
- 1962– Cunningham Residence, Oklahoma City, Oklahoma
- 1965– Unitarian Church, Lexington, Kentucky
- 1966– French Residence, Versailles, Kentucky
- 1977- Cook Residence, Louisville, Kentucky
- 1981- Villa Blanca Farm, Lexington, Kentucky

== Published works ==
- Herb Greene, Mind and Image: An Essay on Art and Architecture, The University Press of Kentucky, 1976
- Herb Greene, Building to Last, Architecture as Ongoing Art, Architectural Book Publishing Company, 1981
- Herb Greene, Painting the Mental Continuum: Perception and Meaning in the Making, Berkeley Hills Books, 2003
- Herb Greene and Lila Cohen, Generations: Six Decades of Collage Art and Architecture, Generated with Perspectives from Science, Oro Editions, 2015
