= John Randal McDonald =

American architect

- Born: 1922; Milwaukee, Wisconsin, United States
- Died: December 3, 2003 (aged 80–81)
- Occupation: Architect
- Spouse: Josephine McDonald

John Randal McDonald (1922–2003) was an American architect who worked in the 1950s and 1960s. McDonald was born in Milwaukee in 1922 and served in World War II as an officer in the U.S. Navy before pursuing a degree in architecture. After a brief stint in the fine arts program at the State Teacher's College, McDonald decided to pursue his interest in architecture at Yale University.

McDonald's work has often been compared to Frank Lloyd Wright's because nature is a continuous theme in his design, emphasizing the importance of a natural setting and the use of natural materials. McDonald also encouraged homeowners to be aware of the elegance of the natural environment, thereby making them more sensitive to nature. McDonald designed unique homes that not only appealed to the general-public, but were affordable.

Initially, McDonald's designs were predominantly for private residences; however, as years passed and his success and reputation increased, he was commissioned to design monasteries, hotels, factories, dormitories, schools, and churches across the country and abroad.

McDonald constructed his first house, located at 801 Lathrop Avenue, Racine, Wisconsin in 1949. McDonald and his family lived in the house for several years before moving to another home he designed located at 1001 Russet Street, also in Racine. In addition to Racine, McDonald designed several private, public, and religious buildings in Milwaukee and Kenosha. He also designed a home in Brookfield Wisconsin. With his continued success, McDonald expanded his business and moved to Florida in the late 1950s. He designed at least three homes in Florida, two in Temple Terrace, Florida and one in Quincy, Florida .

Haleakala Built in 1962, this home in Quincy, Florida is known for having similar characteristics to Frank Lloyd Wright’s Fallingwater, so much so that it was believed to have been designed by Frank Lloyd Wright for many years. Haleakala was named after Maui's volcano and National Park, Haleakala. The home was purchased by a woodcraftsman in the 1980's. As a result, Haleakala has stayed in its original condition due to the regular maintenance of the woodwork, inside and out. Having been inspired Frank Lloyd Wright at a young age, and Sam Maloof in the 1980’s, the owner handcrafted much of the furniture in Haleakala including the cabinets and three grotto-like bathrooms.

McDonald was successful throughout his life as he designed hotels, banks, churches, and marinas throughout the world, as well as homes for various celebrities, such as Björn Borg, Mickey Mantle, Perry Como, Jimmy Connors, James Garner and Maureen O'Hara. McDonald died in 2003.

McDonald had many apprentices in his career; the last was Tom Bloczynski of Marshfield, Wisconsin. Bloczynski remained until McDonald's death in December 2003, and subsequently completed McDonald's unfinished projects.

== References and external links ==
- John R. McDonald's Website
- John R. McDonald book
- Website of Tom Bloczynski, John R. McDonald's Last Apprentice
