= Willamette Shore Trolley =

Heritage railroad/streetcar along the Willamette River

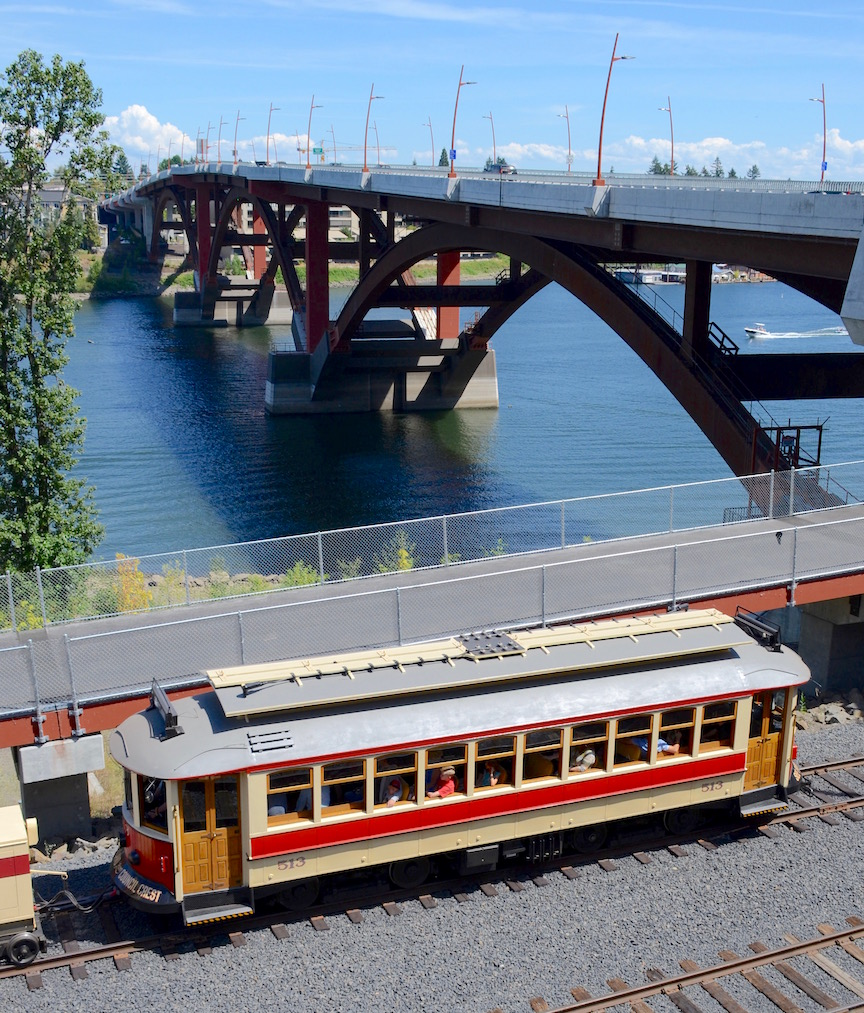
- Car 513 passing the new Sellwood Bridge in 2018

Overview
- Other name: Willamette Shore Railway (1987–90)
- Status: Operating
- Locale: Clackamas / Multnomah counties, Oregon, USA, in Portland metropolitan area
- Termini: Lake Oswego (State St. near A Ave.); Portland (South Waterfront; Moody & Bancroft)
- Website: http://wst.oregontrolley.com

Service
- Type: Heritage streetcar, seasonal operation
- Operator(s): Oregon Electric Railway Historical Society (1987; 1995–present); Gales Creek Enterprises (1990–1994)
- Rolling stock: 2 Gomaco Council Crest “Brill” Replicas

History
- Opened: 1987

Technical
- Line length: 5.51 miles (9 km)
- Track gauge: 1,435 mm (4 ft 8 1/2 in) standard gauge
- Electrification: None; until 2024, electricity was supplied by portable diesel generators; since December 2024, the one trolley in use is battery-powered.
- Operating speed: 15 mph (24 km/h)

The Willamette Shore Trolley is a heritage railroad that operates along the west bank of the Willamette River between Portland and Lake Oswego in the U.S. state of Oregon. The right-of-way is owned by a group of local-area governments who purchased it in 1988 in order to preserve it for potential future rail transit. Streetcar excursion service began operating on a trial basis in 1987, lasting about three months, and regular operation on a long-term basis began in 1990. The Oregon Electric Railway Historical Society has been the line's operator since 1995. The trolley service normally runs on weekends from Memorial Day through Labor Day and with a few special runs during the Christmas season each year.

The railroad offers passenger excursions using a historic or replica-historic trolley on a former Southern Pacific line previously known as the Jefferson Street branch. The line runs for 5.5 miles (9 km), including a passage through the 0.25-mile-long (0.4 km) Elk Rock Tunnel. The Lake Oswego terminal is downtown, alongside State Street (Oregon Route 43) just south of A Avenue. The location of the Portland terminal has varied over the years, but since fall 2003 it has been at SW Bancroft Street and Moody Avenue in the new high-density South Waterfront neighborhood under construction, a location that was only one block south of the Portland Streetcar terminus at SW Lowell Street and Moody Avenue after the latter's extension in 2007. However, all service on the Willamette Shore line was suspended in July 2010, when the line's only streetcar broke down. In early 2013, a lease was secured on a replacement streetcar, a Gomaco-built faux-Vintage Trolley, to enable a resumption of service on the southernmost portion of the line, and that section of the line reopened in August 2014. Service over the northern half of the line, to Bancroft Street in Portland, was restored on July 21, 2017, but was suspended again at the end of 2019, awaiting trestle repair work, leaving only the line's southernmost section in operation. Most of the line's northern half reopened again in fall 2024, after the end of the regular season but in time to allow the annual Christmastime runs to cover almost the full line, as far north as Boundary Street.

One of the two Gomaco-built "Vintage Trolleys" in the current fleet, No. 514, was taken out of service in early 2019 for work to convert it to battery propulsion, during which car 513 provided all service. The conversion work was completed in February 2024 and, after testing and small adjustments, car 514 made its first passenger trip as a battery-powered trolley in November 2024 (on a charter trip). After the annual Christmas runs, car 513 was taken out of service for the start of work to convert it to battery power.

== Corridor history ==
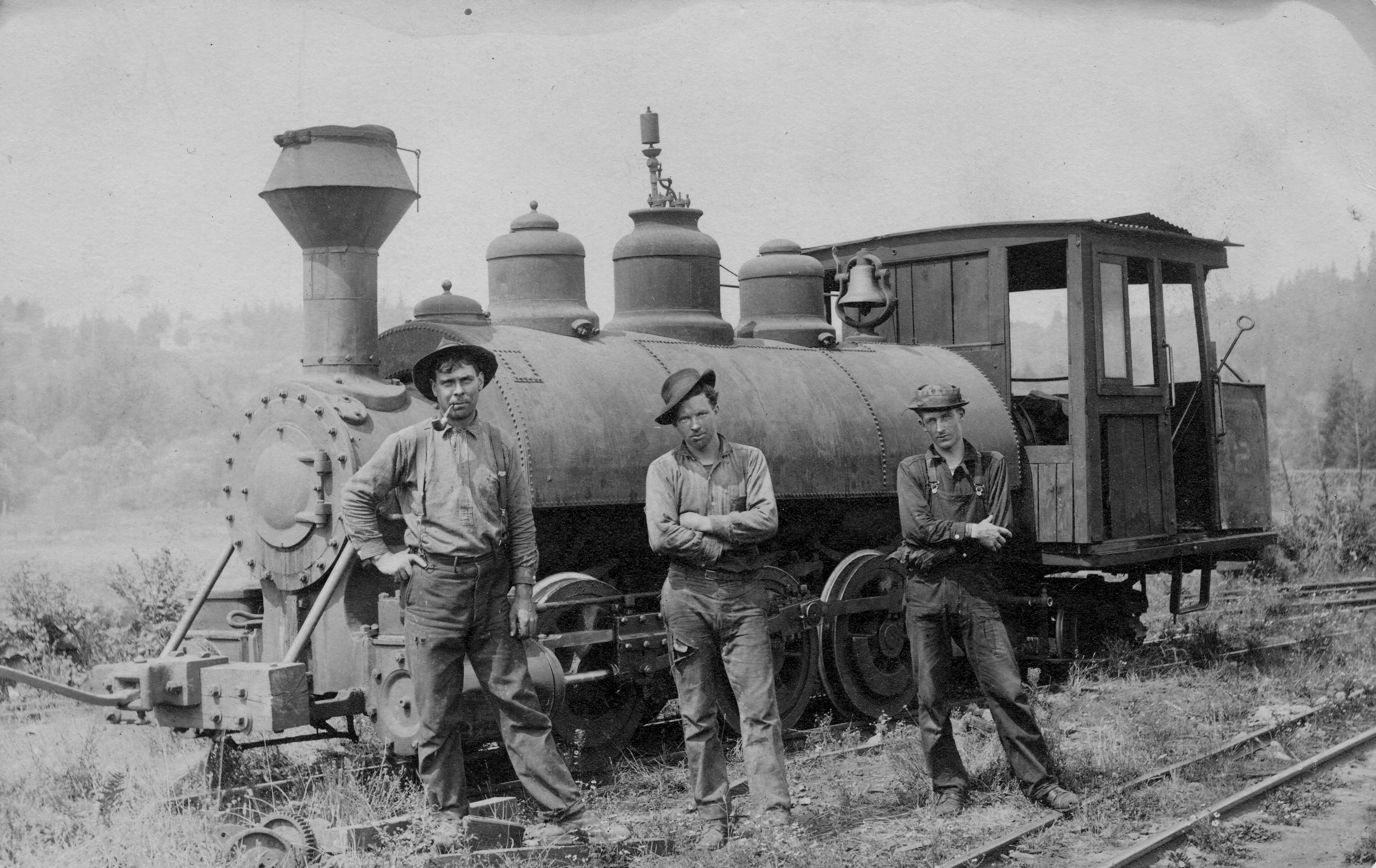
A narrow gauge locomotive in Lake Oswego, c. 1900

The right-of-way now used by the Willamette Shore Trolley was established in the mid-1880s by the Portland and Willamette Valley Railway, which began passenger service with steam trains on July 4, 1887. It provided Oswego (as Lake Oswego was known then) with a direct link to Portland. Prior to this, access to Oswego was limited to primitive roads and river boats.

The line was later purchased by the Southern Pacific Company. Southern Pacific widened the line from narrow gauge to standard gauge and electrified it in 1914. This led to its peak in passenger travel in 1920, when 64 "Red Electric" interurban trains traveled daily between the two cities. The line originally ran around Elk Rock – a bend in the river just north of Elk Rock Island – on a long trestle until December 1921, when a tunnel replaced it. The Elk Rock Tunnel is 1,396 feet (426 m) (approx. one-quarter mile) in length and is located in the unincorporated Riverwood area, between Portland and Lake Oswego. On October 5, 1929, passenger service ended, though the line was used for freight until 1983.

== Right-of-way preserved, experimental trolley service ==
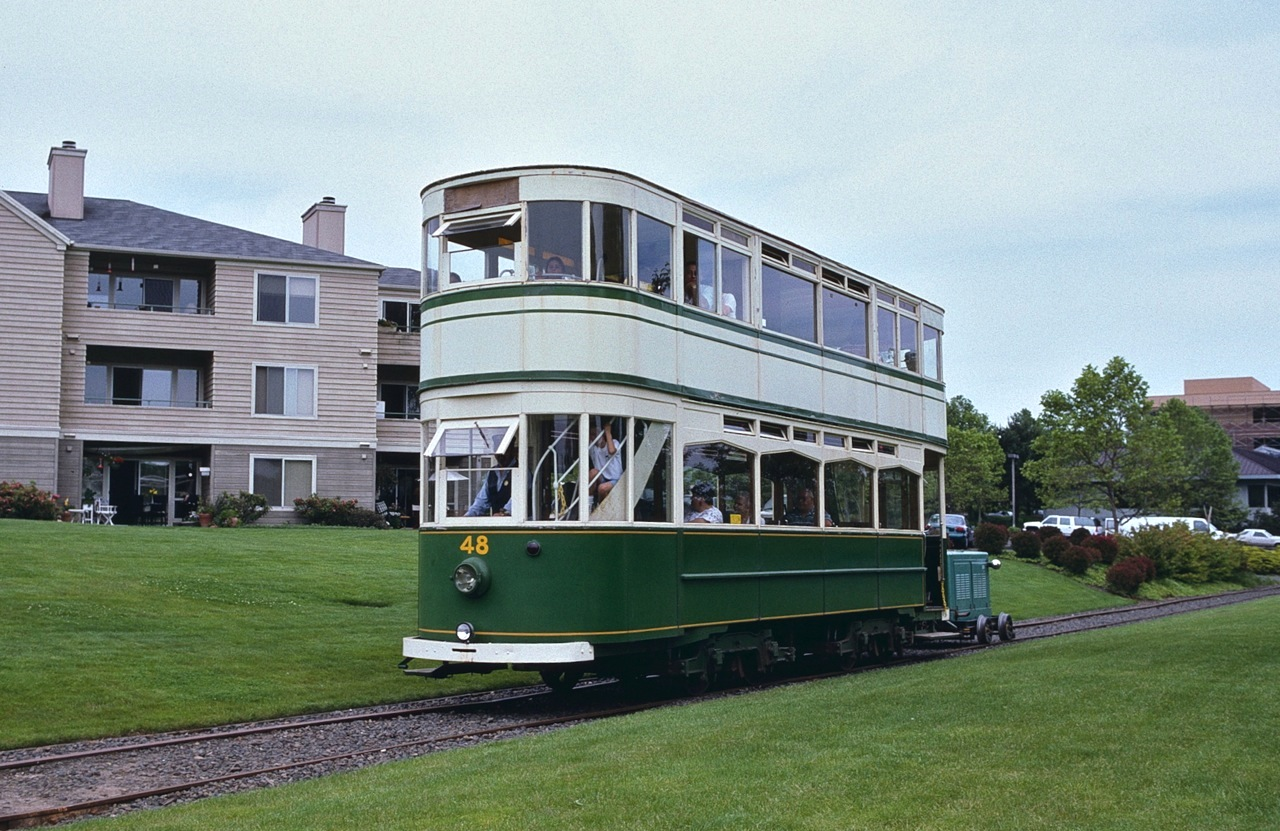
Blackpool car 48, a British double-decker tram built in 1928, operated on the line in 1987 and again from 1995–2003.

In August 1984, the Interstate Commerce Commission granted Southern Pacific permission to abandon the line. This prompted several local governments in the area to establish a not-for-profit corporation to acquire the line and preserve the right-of-way for future mass transit. This consortium of governmental entities was initially composed of Metro, TriMet, the cities of Portland and Lake Oswego, and the counties of Multnomah and Clackamas, and it was later joined by the Oregon Department of Transportation (ODOT). The line's official name at that time was the Jefferson Street Branch, because during the passenger-service era it had served a station called Jefferson Street and continued into downtown Portland via that street.

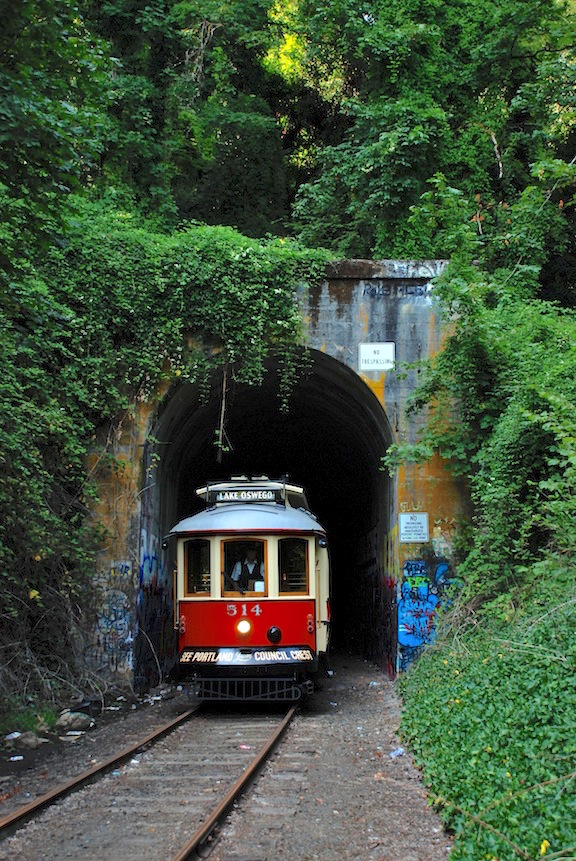
The southern portal of the quarter-mile-long Elk Rock Tunnel in 2014

In January 1987, on behalf of the consortium, the City of Portland secured a lease of the 6.2-mile line from Southern Pacific (SP), including an option to purchase the line. In autumn 1987, a heritage streetcar/trolley service was operated on the line, as a way to gauge public interest in such an operation, in order to help preserve the right-of-way if the plans to purchase the line came to fruition. This temporary, trial heritage trolley service was inaugurated on September 12, 1987, and was operated by the Oregon Electric Railway Historical Society (OERHS), using a double-deck trolley originally from Blackpool, England. OERHS named the operation the Willamette Shore Railway, and service ran on weekends and holidays until the end of the year only. As the line lacks overhead trolley wires, the electricity to power the trolley's motors was generated by a diesel engine mounted on a cart towed behind (or pushed in front of) the car. The Portland terminus, with a ticket office in a leased trailer, was located next to Moody Avenue, below the west approach viaducts to the Marquam Bridge. The Lake Oswego terminus was located about one-half mile north of downtown.

The consortium purchased the line from Southern Pacific in October 1988, for US$1.9 million, including the cost of a planned extension in Lake Oswego, to be constructed by SP. Metro identified it as a possible transit corridor.

== Regular service, extensions ==
Regular, seasonal vintage streetcar service began operation on July 6, 1990, now named the Willamette Shore Trolley. A private company named Gales Creek Enterprises was the operator for the first five seasons, under contract with the City of Lake Oswego. A 1913-built streetcar originally from San Antonio, Texas, was used, with a diesel-powered generator trailer again employed to provide electricity to the streetcar. The ends of the line remained the same as they had been during the 1987 trial service: near the Marquam Bridge in Portland, and near State Street and Terwilliger Boulevard in Lake Oswego.

In 1993, a half-mile of new track was laid in Lake Oswego, permitting extension of the trolley service south to a terminus just south of A Avenue, much closer to the city center. The ticket office was then relocated into a small building owned by Southern Pacific at the new Lake Oswego terminus, and since that time, round-trip excursions have started at the line's south end, rather than in Portland. The contract with Gales Creek Enterprises was not renewed when it expired at the end of 1994. (The ex-San Antonio streetcar was put into storage but in 1998 was leased, and in 2005 sold, to the Astoria Riverfront Trolley Association.)

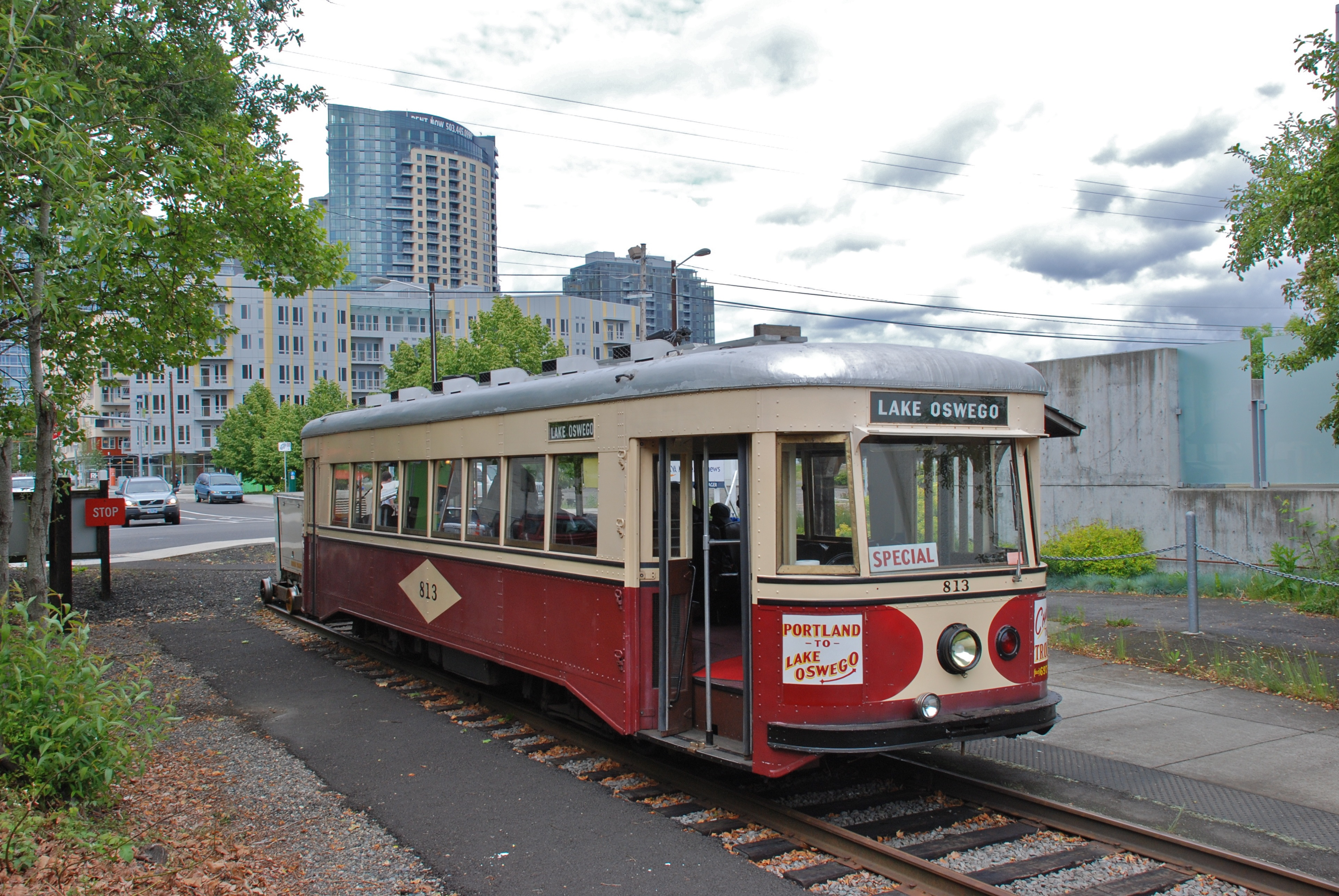
The trolley car used from 1996 until 2010 was Portland Traction Company car 813, built in 1932. It is pictured at the Bancroft Street terminus, in Portland's South Waterfront district.

In 1995, the Oregon Electric Railway Historical Society again became the operator of the trolley service, now on a longer-term basis, under contract to Lake Oswego. Trolley operation resumed in August 1995, initially using a former Sydney, Australia open-sided streetcar, but only as a temporary substitute until the intended car could be moved to the line. This was 1928-built Blackpool tram 48, the same double-deck trolley which OERHS had operated on the Willamette Shore line for a few months in fall 1987. The double-decker entered service on November 24, 1995. It was joined in December 1996 by another streetcar in OERHS's collection, a 1932 Brill "Master Unit"-type streetcar which had spent its entire working life in Portland, where the cars of that model gained the nickname "Broadway cars", from the route they first served.

In April 1997, the line was extended from its north end, to the RiverPlace district, increasing its overall length to about 7 miles (11 km). Charlie Hales, then a city commissioner, opined in 1998 that the line had an important future as part of the MAX light rail system. Because of major construction in the then-new South Waterfront district, the new section of track was last used in September 2003, and service was thereafter cut back to a new terminal located immediately south of Bancroft Street. The Blackpool double-decker was taken out of regular use on the Willamette Shore Trolley in late 2003 and was moved in May 2006 to OERHS's museum, the Oregon Electric Railway Museum, in Brooks, Oregon. After that, the 1932 Portland Brill streetcar, No. 813, became the only streetcar serving the WST line.

Service is provided on a seasonal basis, rather than year-round, the regular operating season normally lasting from May to October, followed by limited operation on a few dates during the Christmas and holiday season, in December each year.

As a tourist attraction, the line is most popular on the Fourth of July, when the Oaks Amusement Park fireworks display is viewable along the river, and in mid-December, when the area's Christmas Ships Parade on the Willamette can be viewed.

== 2009 to present ==
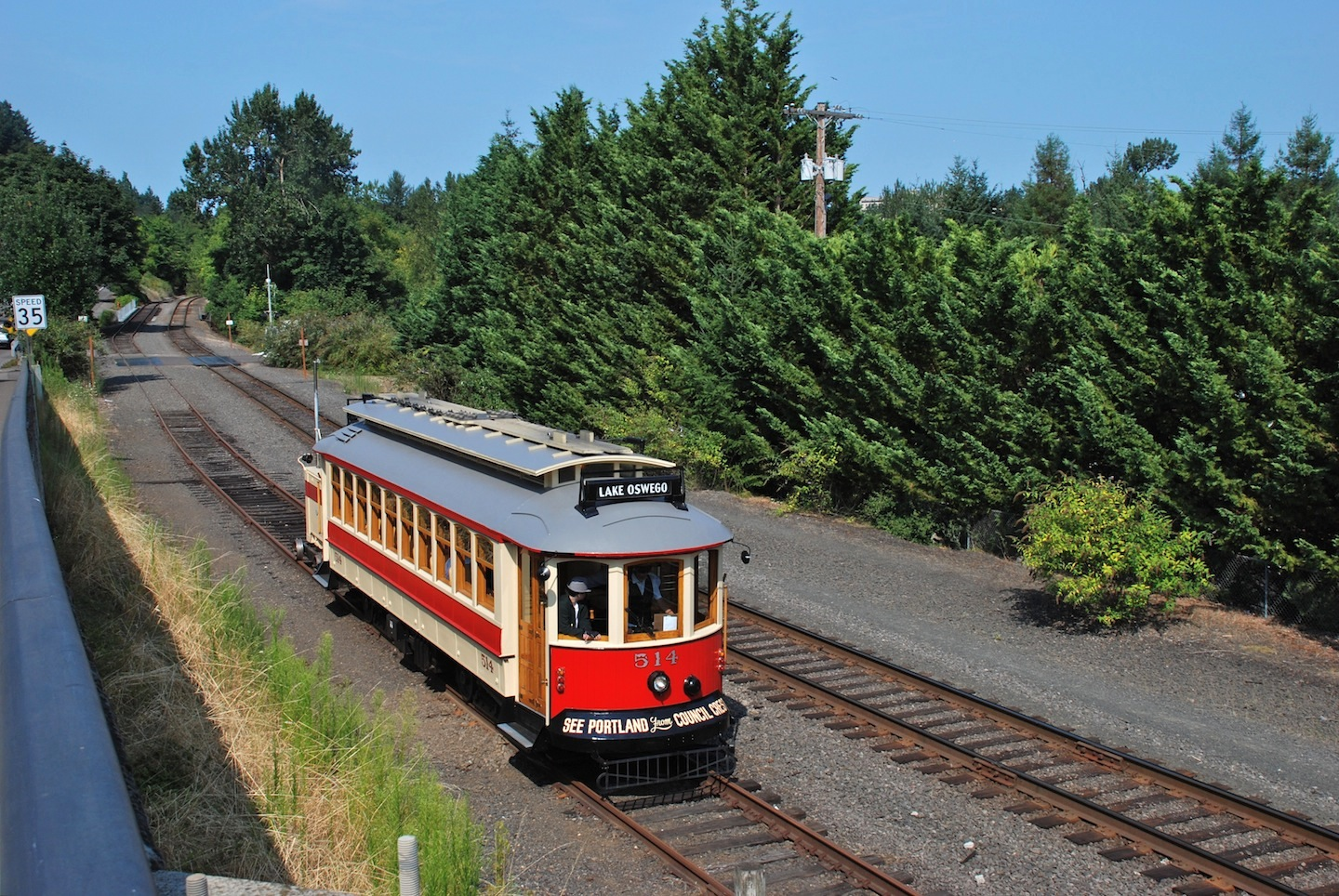
Car 514 approaching Lake Oswego in 2014

For most of 2009, all service was suspended, so as to permit work to rehabilitate the line's four trestle bridges. The longest of these is Riverwood Trestle, which is 686 feet (209 m) long and about 75 feet (23 m) high. Service resumed during the 2009 Christmas and holiday season. The 2010 season began on May 1, but the line's only streetcar broke down on July 16, 2010, causing an indefinite suspension of service. This suspension continued in 2011 and 2012, because the estimated cost to repair the car was high, and no substitute streetcar was available. After OERHS determined that repair of the 1932-built streetcar, Portland Brill car 813, would be prohibitively expensive in the foreseeable future, the group began looking for a replacement. Car 813 was moved from Lake Oswego to the Oregon Electric Railway Museum, near Salem, in June 2012.

In early 2013, a lease was secured on a replacement streetcar, and the non-profit group's goal was to resume service in summer 2013 on the southernmost part of the line. In October, it was announced that the restarting of service had been postponed to summer 2014. In August 2014, the date for service to resume was set for August 16. The replacement car is a replica of a 1904 Portland "Council Crest"-type Brill streetcar built in 1991 by the Gomaco Trolley Company, for use on the Portland Vintage Trolley service. It is car number 514, and it was moved from TriMet's Vintage Trolley carbarn next to the Rose Quarter Transit Center to Lake Oswego on March 26, 2013. One year later, following the discontinuation of Vintage Trolley service in July 2014, a second replica-Council Crest streetcar, car 513, was moved to Lake Oswego on September 8, 2014, and initially was placed into storage, awaiting later restoration.

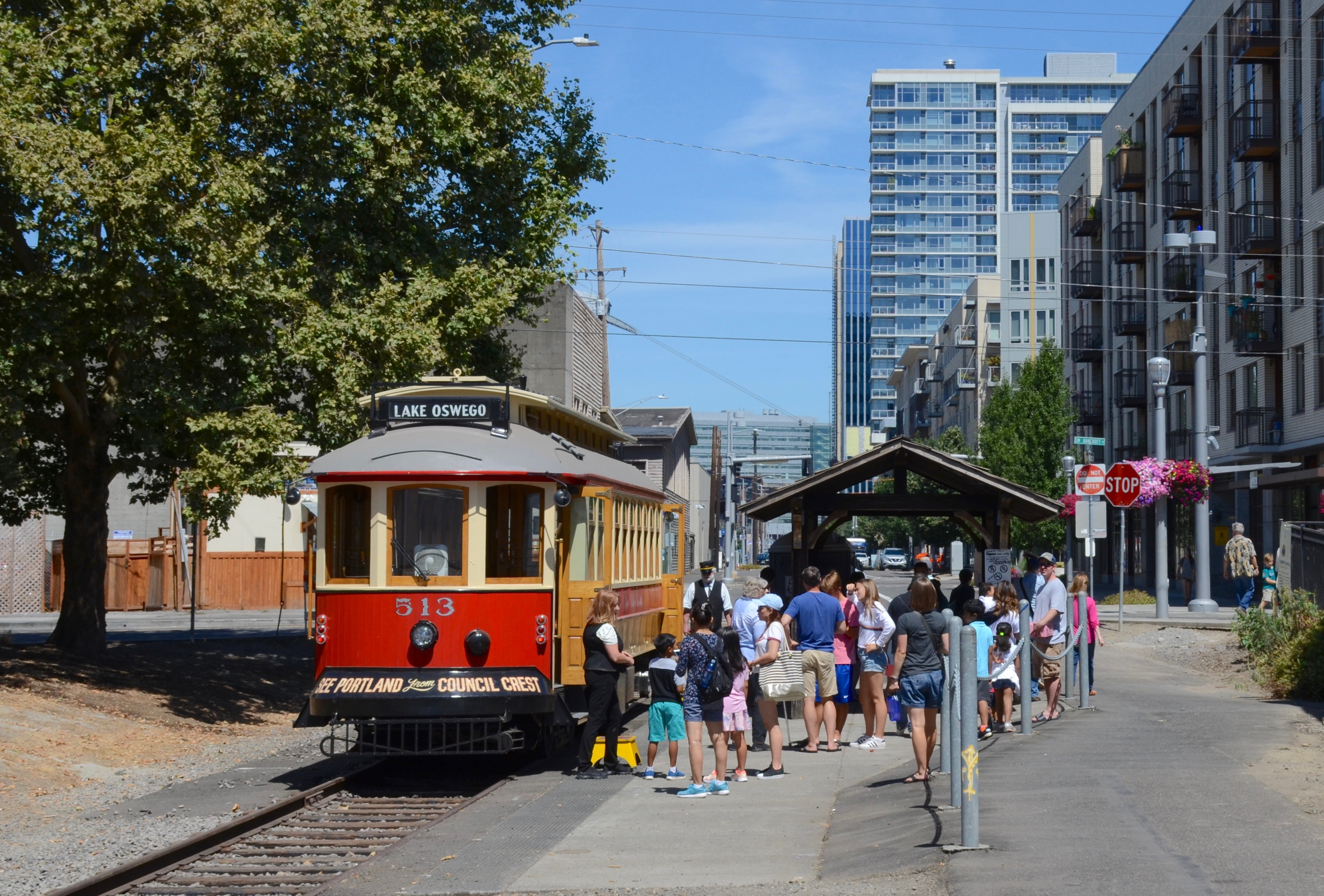
Car 513 at the Bancroft Street terminus in Portland. Service on this part of the line was suspended from the end of 2019 to fall 2024, because of a need for trestle repair.

The line reopened for public rides on August 16, 2014, using car 514. Because of major construction affecting the rail line where it passes through the site of construction of a new Sellwood Bridge (among other issues), it was known that Willamette Shore Trolley service would not be able to run through to Portland for quite some time, until 2016 or 2017. When reopened in 2014, it was running only between Lake Oswego and Riverwood, but one year later, on August 8, 2015, service was extended north to Powers Marine Park (just south of the Sellwood Bridge). This increased the length of line in use to around 3 miles (5 km). The 2016 season began on May 28.

The 2017 season began on May 27, with the service's northern terminus still temporarily being at Powers Marine Park, but with the track in the area around the Sellwood Bridge having been reinstated and test runs made. On July 21, 2017, the service was reextended to its pre-2011 Portland terminus, at Bancroft Street, which is one block from the South Waterfront terminus of the Portland Streetcar's NS Line.

Car 513 was restored to operating condition, and it entered service on the WST in 2018, on May 26. Prior to this, its last operation with passengers had been on the Portland Streetcar line, more than 12 years earlier.

Because of the COVID-19 pandemic, service was suspended for the 2020 season and remained suspended in spring 2021, but the line reopened for service on July 3, 2021. Operation is temporarily limited to the southern portion of the line. The same limitation extended to the 2022 season, because of the need for trestle repairs, and the 2023 season, which began on the Saturday of Memorial Day weekend. Trestle repair work was expected to begin in 2023. After trestle repair was completed, most of the line's northern half reopened again in fall 2024, after the end of the regular season but in time to allow the annual Christmastime runs to cover almost the entire line, as far north as Boundary Street (for the first time since 2019), with the half-mile-long last section to Bancroft Street reopening at the beginning of the 2025 season, in May.

== Conversion to battery power ==
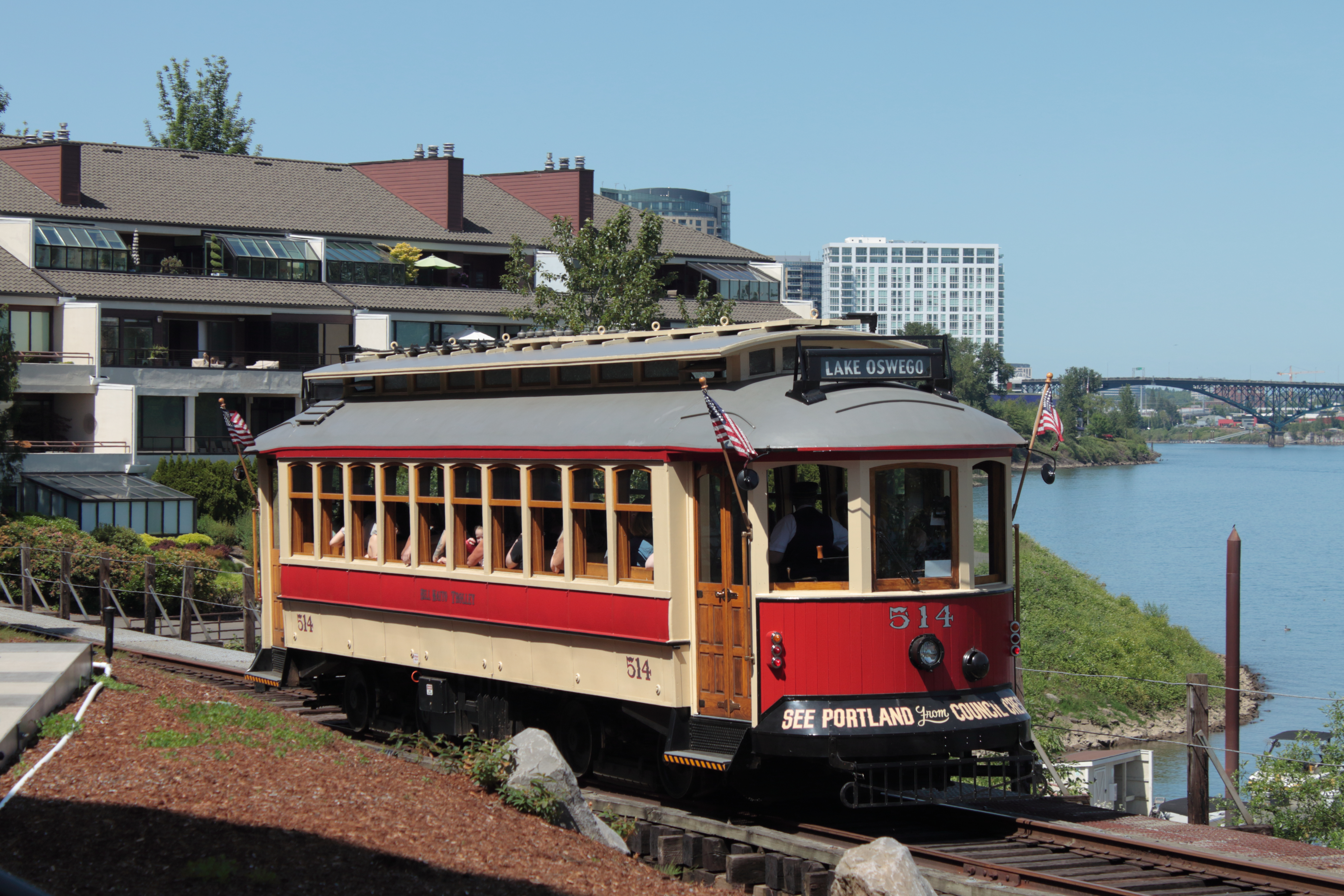
The Willamette Shore Trolley #514 under battery power during the 2025 reopening

In late January 2019, maintenance crews started removing old DC motor equipment on car 514 as the first stage of a project to convert the streetcar to AC motors and battery propulsion. The conversion project was a collaboration between the WST's volunteers and EVDrive Inc., a company based in Hillsboro, Oregon. The new system allows operation without the need for a diesel generator to be towed or pushed by the trolley car. AC motors would also allow regenerative braking in the battery, extending the duration of its charge. The conversion of car 514 took longer than originally expected but was completed in February 2024, and after testing and minor adjustments the trolley made its first passenger trip as a battery-powered trolley on November 16, 2024 (on a charter trip). Fundraising to allow car 513 also to be converted to this new system had already been underway for some time by then, and after the 2024 Christmas runs, it was taken out of service for the start of that conversion work.

== Carbarn ==
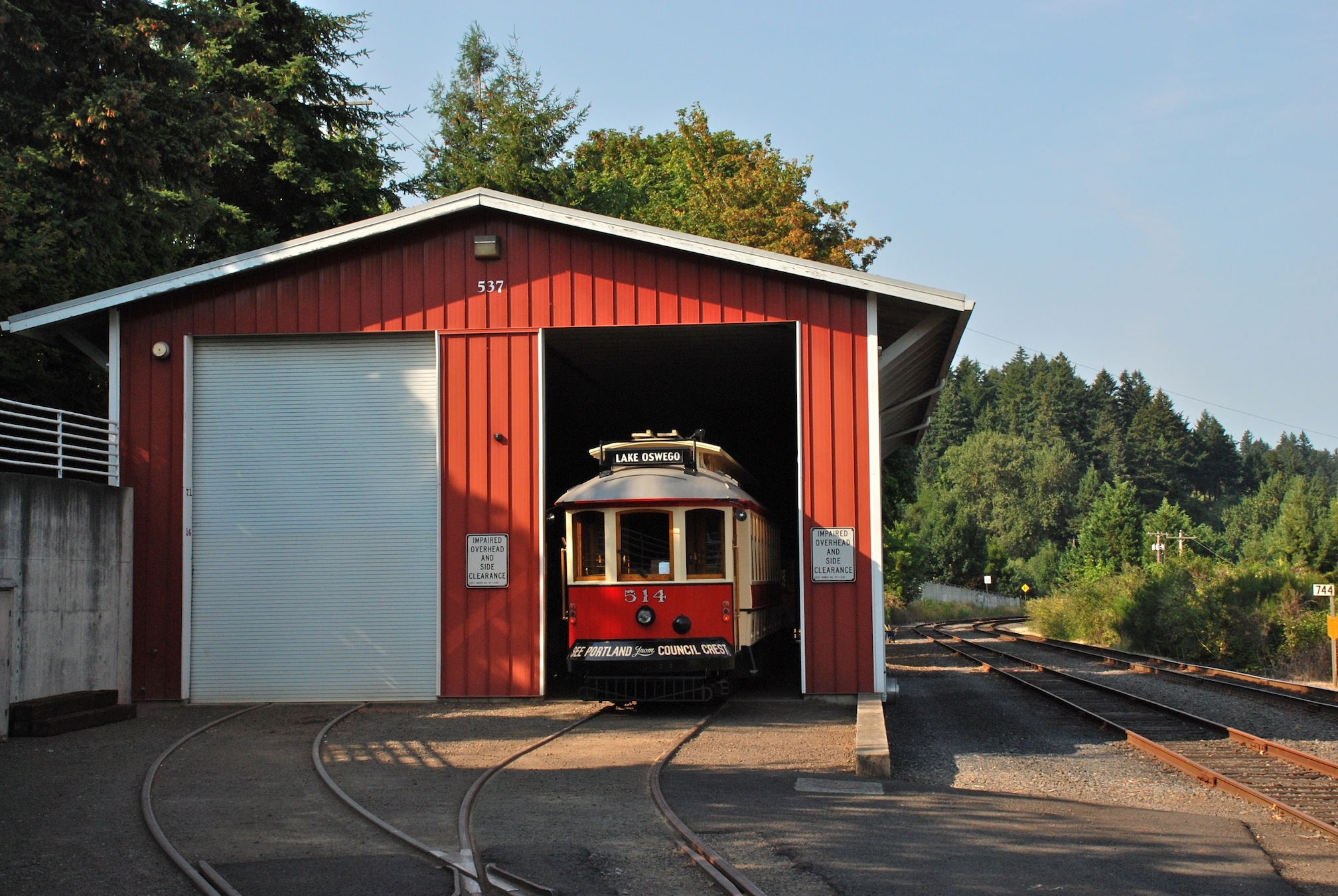
The line's carbarn (maintenance and storage building), located near the Lake Oswego terminus

Since 1998, the Willamette Shore Trolley has had a two-track maintenance building, or carbarn, near the Lake Oswego terminus, where the trolley cars are stored and maintained. Prior to 1998, any trolleys being used on the line had to be stored outdoors, protected with chain-link fencing from vandalism and theft, but not well protected from exposure to the weather. In the mid-1990s, the consortium of governments that own the line secured a federal grant to fund most of the $600,000 cost of building a carbarn in Lake Oswego. Construction began in February 1998, and the 3,000-square-foot (280 m^{2}) facility was completed and dedicated in September 1998.

== Future transit possibilities ==
A proposal to convert the line into an extension of the Portland Streetcar, running through Johns Landing and into Lake Oswego, has been studied by Metro, Portland, Lake Oswego and TriMet. Work on an environmental-impact assessment started in spring 2009, considering both the streetcar option and the alternative of "enhanced bus" service, or bus rapid transit (BRT). The streetcar proposal faced opposition from residents of affluent neighborhoods near the tracks, but was preferred by Metro, in part because BRT would likely require giving up one auto lane to buses in some sections to be effective, as the existing roadway, Hwy. 43, is thought likely to be too constricted by topography to enable widening. Planning work on the proposal was indefinitely suspended in early 2012, in light of escalating cost estimates for construction.

== See also ==
- Lake Oswego Transit Center
- List of heritage railroads in the United States
