= Issaquah Valley Trolley =

Heritage streetcar in Washington, US

Coordinates: 47°31′52″N 122°02′08″W

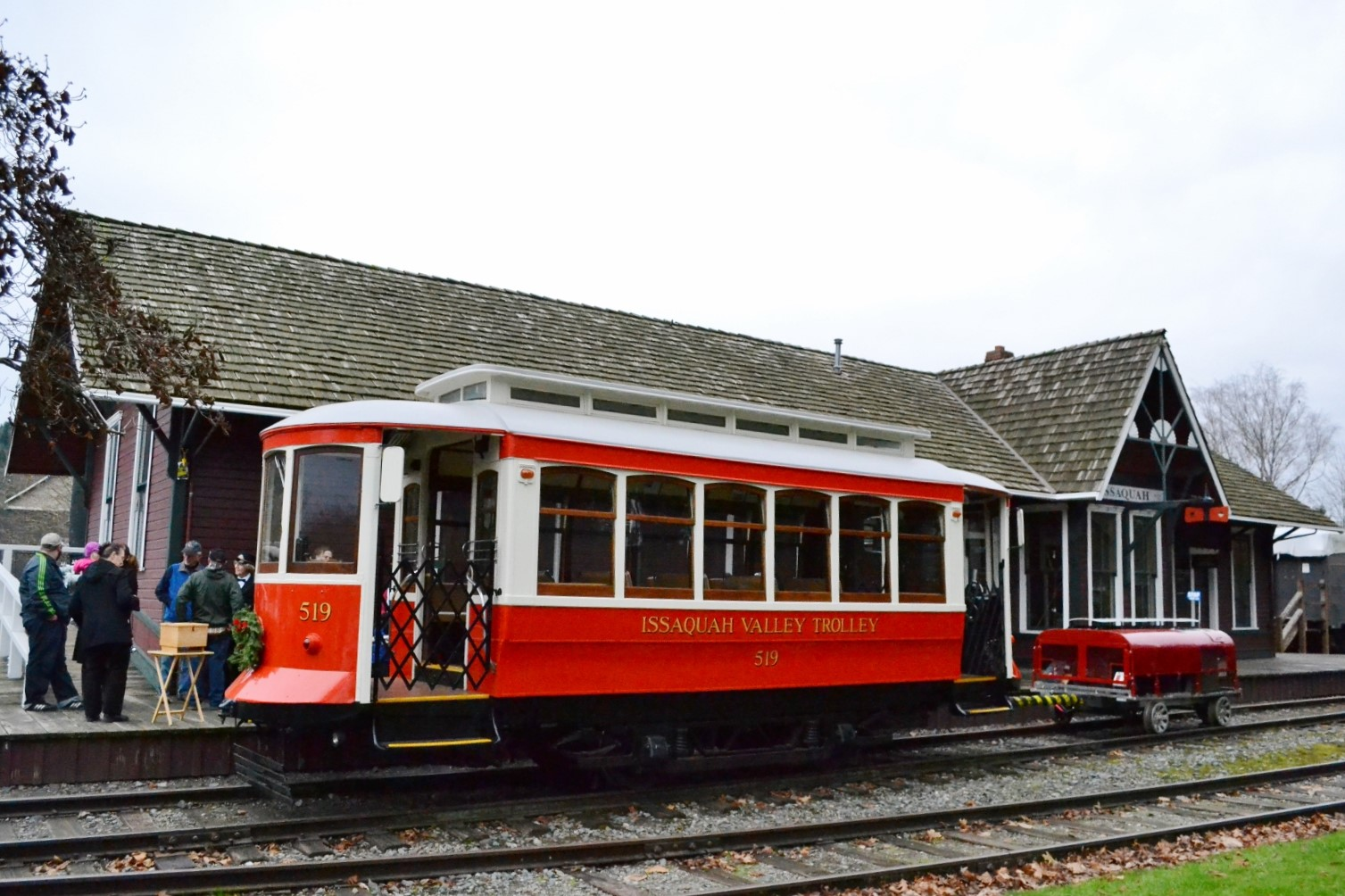
Restored IVT car No. 519 at the Issaquah Depot

The Issaquah Valley Trolley (IVT) is a heritage streetcar line in Issaquah, Washington, United States. It is a project of the Issaquah History Museums (formerly known as the Issaquah Historical Society). The IVT operates from the Issaquah Depot Museum building located at 78 First Ave, NE. The service operated on a trial basis in 2001–02 and then on a regular basis, seasonally, from 2012 to 2020 and again since August 2026.

== History ==
After restoration of the Issaquah Depot neared completion in 1989, a group of Issaquah Historical Society members considered options for active use of the tracks leading to and from the restored depot. Discussions included dinner trains, passenger trains and eventually led to the easier to manage streetcar option.

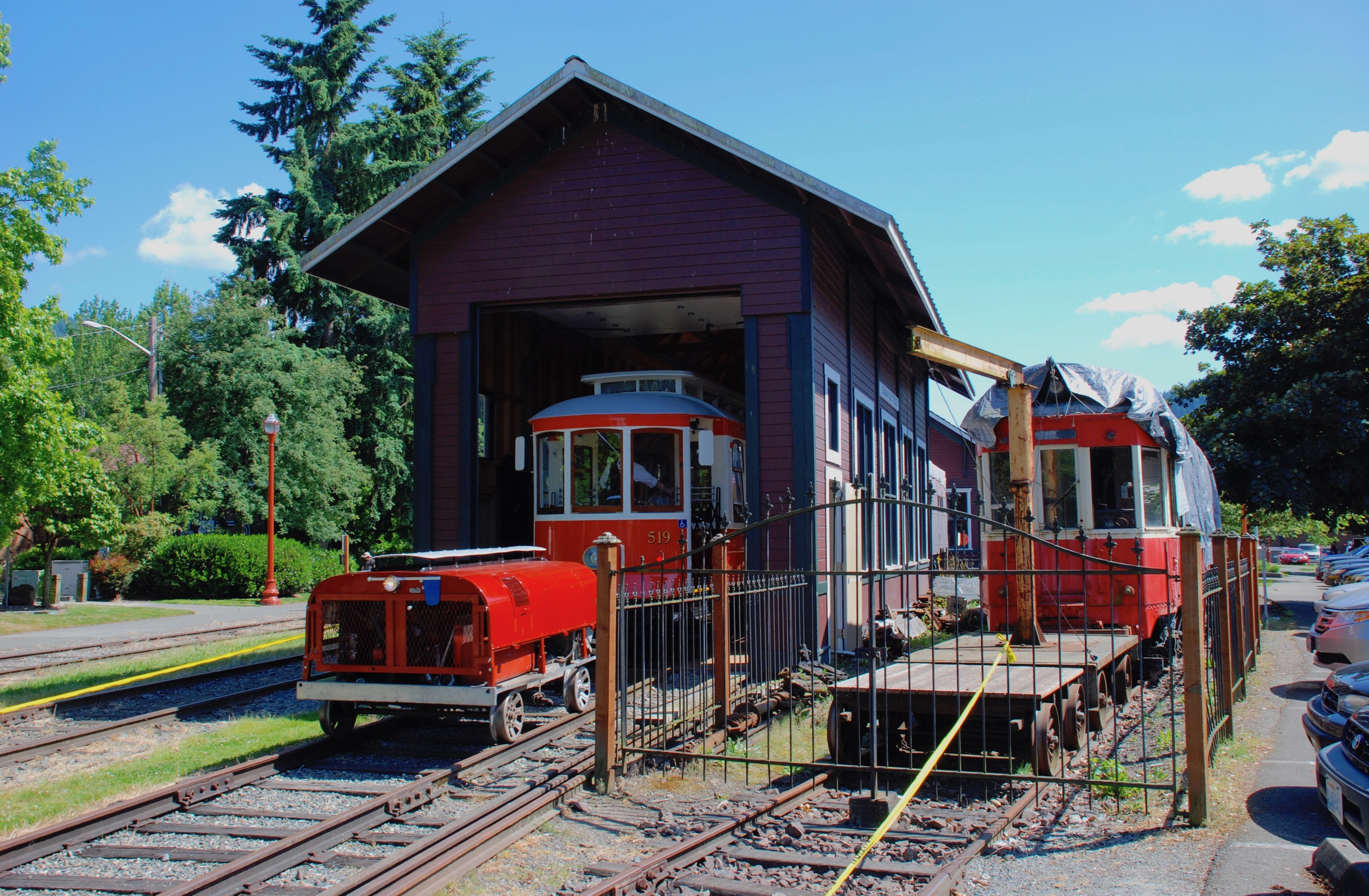
The carbarn in 2014, with Brill car 519 pulling in at the end of the day. At right is ex-Milan car 96, which was never operated in Issaquah.

In 2001–02, a trolley car borrowed from Yakima Valley Trolleys was operated along existing, former-freight railroad track to prove the concept that an operating trolley in Issaquah would attract ridership. The borrowed streetcar had arrived in Issaquah in October 2000, and began carrying passengers on May 19, 2001, with the service operating on Saturdays and Sundays from 11:00 a.m. to 3:00 p.m. through the summer and again in spring 2002.

In spring 2001, a small carbarn to house the trolley car was built adjacent to the Issaquah Depot. It is 50 feet (15.2 m) long, with a capacity to store just one trolley (and its towed generator). IVT sometimes refers to it as the "display building", because glass windows on its west side allow the public to see the trolley car inside.

After returning the borrowed trolley to Yakima in May 2002, Issaquah acquired three trolleys of its own: an ex-Milan interurban car (No. 96) from the San Francisco Municipal Transportation Agency, and two narrow gauge ex-Lisbon trolleys (Nos. 519 and 521, built in Lisbon in 1925) from a failed plan for a trolley line in Aspen, Colorado. None was able to operate, as they all needed restoration work before being usable for service, and the ex-Lisbon trolleys also required "re-gauging" from 900 mm (2 ft 11 7/16 in) gauge to 4 ft 8 1/2 in (1,435 mm) standard gauge to enable them to run on the existing railroad track in Issaquah.

In March 2012, one of the ex-Lisbon cars, No. 519, was sent to the Gomaco Trolley Company, in Iowa, for restoration and re-gauging of its truck. The car returned from Gomaco in August, its restoration completed, and made a test run over the line. with additional crew training then following. It entered service in Issaquah on October 14, 2012.

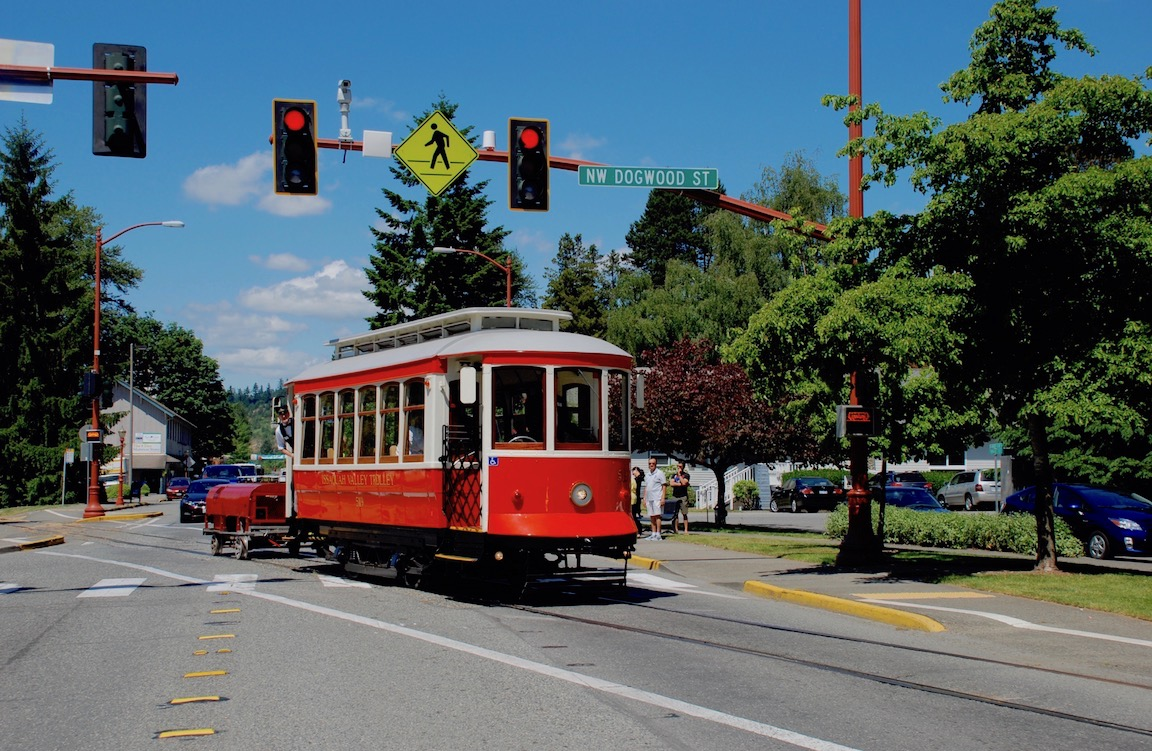
Restored ex-Lisbon car 519 crossing Front Street in 2014

As part of its payment to Gomaco for restoration of car 519, IVT transferred ownership of the other Lisbon car, No. 521, to Gomaco. The car was shipped to Gomaco in August 2012, and Gomaco began a heavy restoration of it as an internal project.

By that time, IVT had dropped all plans to use the 1930-built ex-Milan car No. 96 and put it up for sale. The car was sold in 2015 to the Oregon Electric Railway Historical Society and was transported to the Oregon Electric Railway Museum in December 2016.

The IVT group's original hopes to rebuild one to two miles (3.2 km) of recently removed track on the Lake Sammamish rail-trail, as far as the boat-launch, were dashed upon removal of rail equipment and completion of the East Lake Sammamish Trail in 2006.

In autumn 2020, amid the COVID-19 pandemic, Issaquah History Museums announced that it had decided to discontinue operation of the streetcar permanently, citing increasing insurance costs and other factors that had raised the cost of operation, in combination with cuts to the organization's financial resources. Operation restarted on August 1, 2026.

== Operation ==
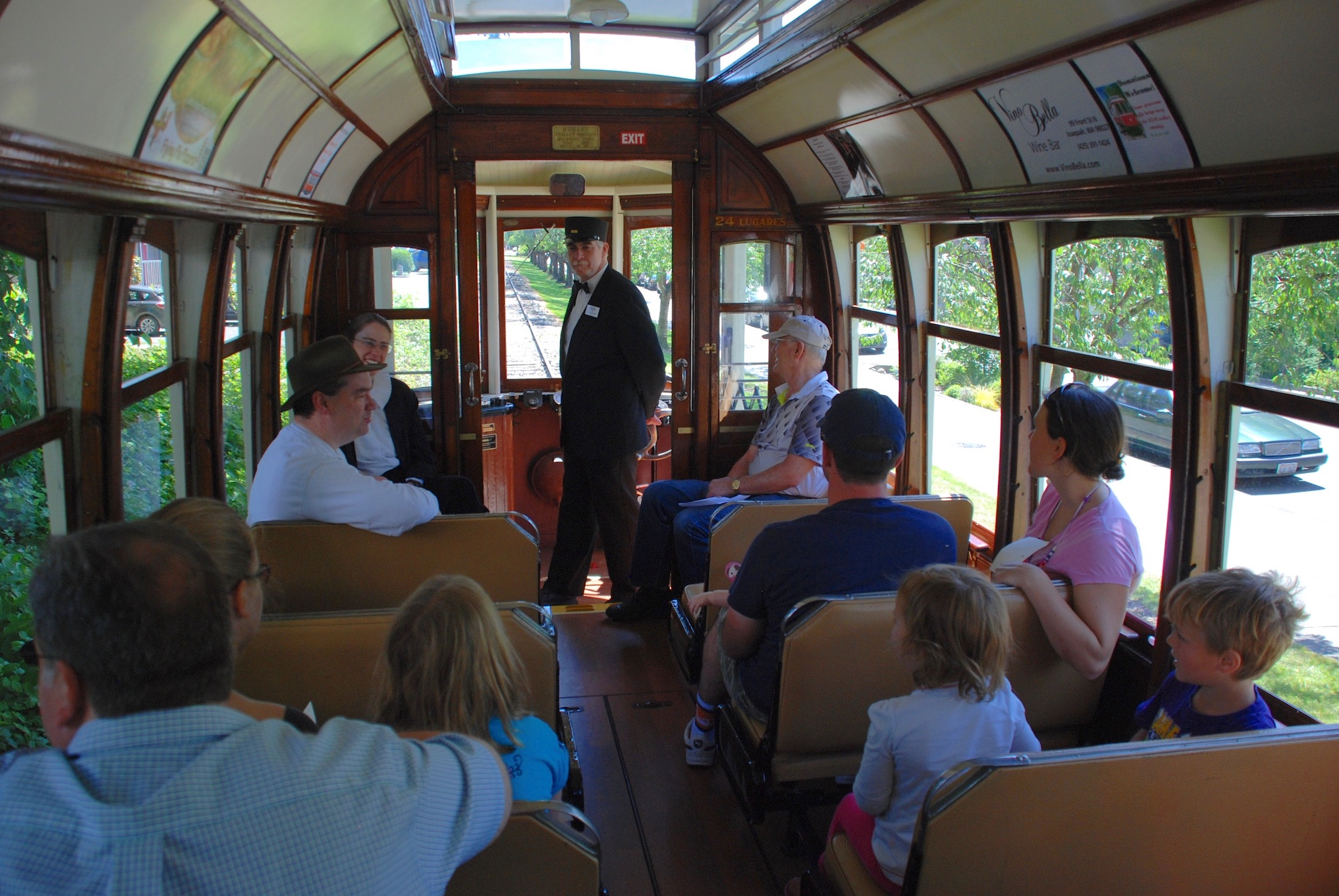
Interior of car 519 in service

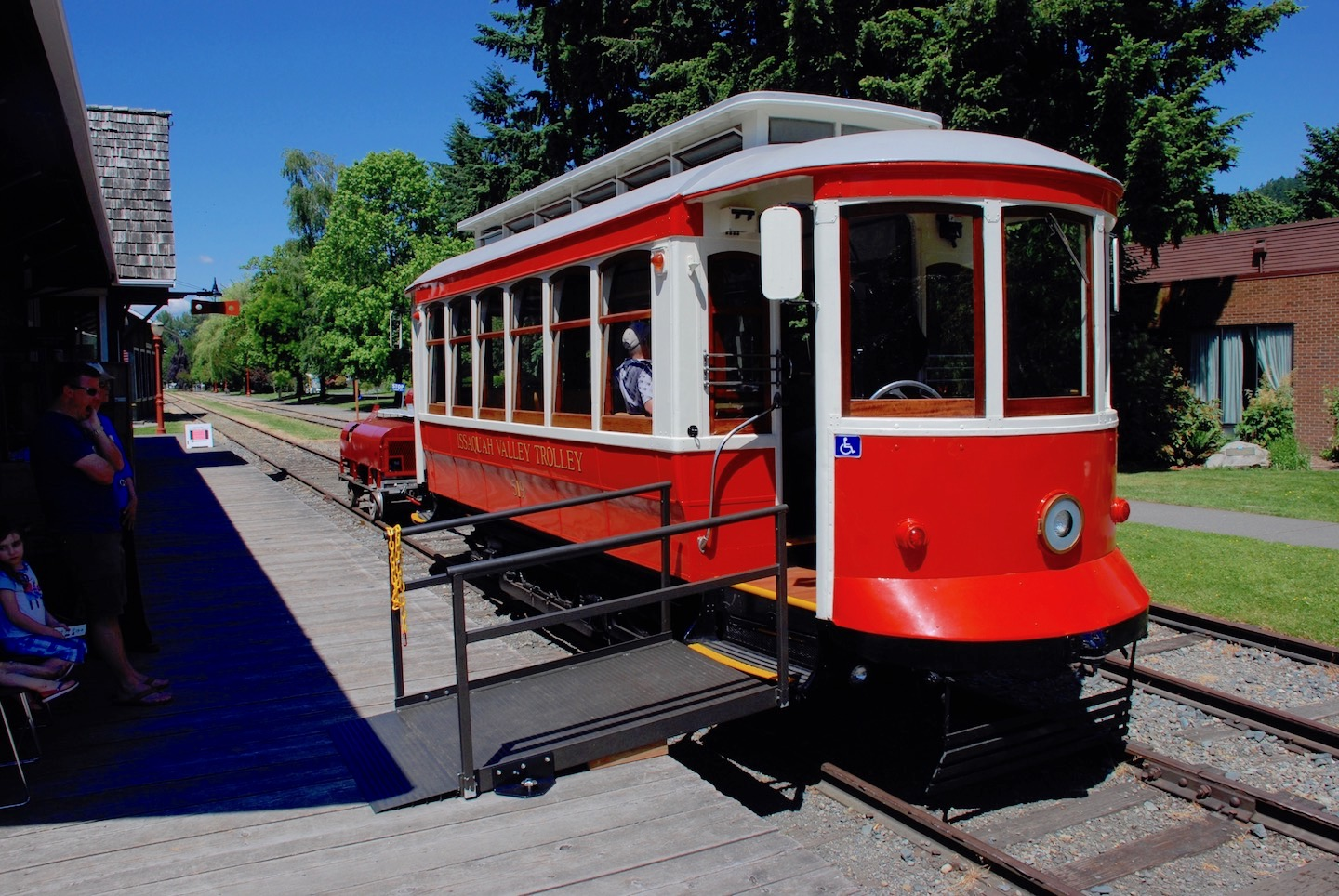
Car 519 at the Issaquah Depot terminus, with a ramp or bridge plate in place for easier and safer boarding

Public service began on October 14, 2012, with initial hours of operation scheduled for weekends from 11 a.m. to 3 p.m. until sometime in November. The section of railroad line brought into use for rides at that time was about one-half-mile (0.80 km) long, stopping just before the bridge over the East Fork of Issaquah Creek. The section of the track north of the bridge could not be used until repair work on the bridge. By 2016, rehabilitation work on the bridge had been completed, allowing the route to be extended across and beyond the bridge, to Gilman Blvd., where the track ends. The extended line came into use at the beginning of the 2016 season, on May 7, making the overall length of usable track about 0.6 miles (1 km) long. The line includes two level crossing, of Front Street, and NW Holly Street. Before the line's 2020 closure, future plans had included building a small covered platform at the end of the line adjacent to the Issaquah Chamber of Commerce building, which have would be allowed the trolley to serve the purpose of an actual (though limited) transit system, ferrying riders between Issaquah's downtown (accessed from the Issaquah Depot) and the Issaquah commercial core's other major pedestrian destinations: Confluence Park and the Gilman Village shopping district (accessed from the new Gilman Station).

The trolley tows a generator car to supply its traction motors with electricity, rather than receiving power from overhead wires.

The museum also had an operational 0-4-0 Plymouth gasoline-mechanical locomotive for use as a rescue vehicle if the trolley were to fail mid-trip. However, in 2024, it was donated to the Peninsular Railway and Lumbermen's Museum, in Shelton, Washington, and in April of that year it was placed on display in Aberdeen, Washington.

Passenger service on the Issaquah Valley Trolley resumed on August 1, 2026, six years after shutting down, with revenue runs from the historic depot to Gilman Blvd. on weekends through September.

== See also ==
- East Lake Sammamish Trail
- Seattle, Lake Shore and Eastern Railway
- Burke-Gilman Trail
