= Oregon Electric Railway Museum =

Museum in Brooks, Oregon, United States

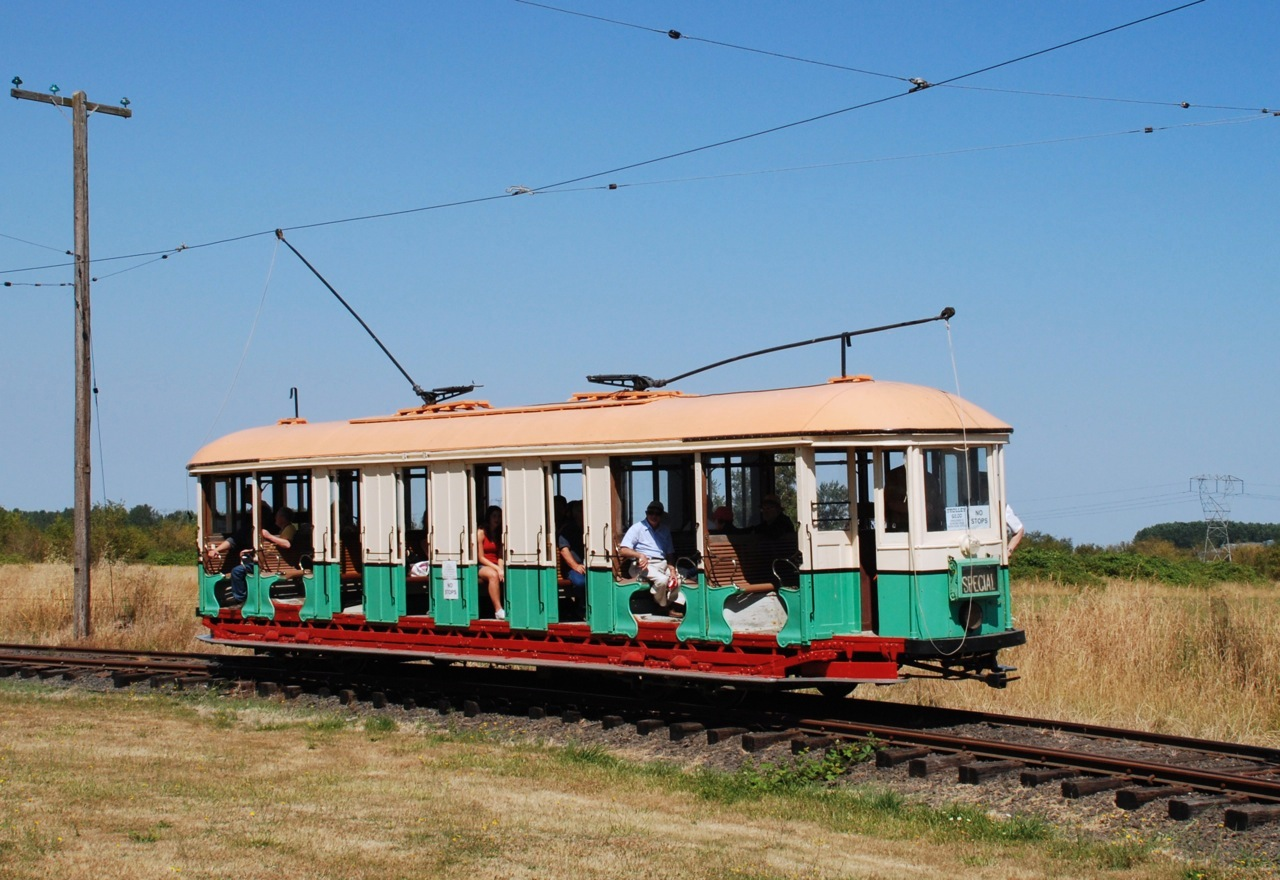
- Sydney car 1187 (built 1912) at the museum
- Former name: Glenwood Electric Railway "Trolley Park"
- Established: 1959
- Location: Brooks, Oregon, U.S.
- Coordinates: 45.051677°N 122.979589°W
- Website: museum.oregontrolley.com

The Oregon Electric Railway Museum is the largest streetcar/trolley museum in the Pacific Northwest of the United States. It is owned and operated by the Oregon Electric Railway Historical Society and is located in Brooks, Oregon, on the grounds of Powerland Heritage Park.

== History ==
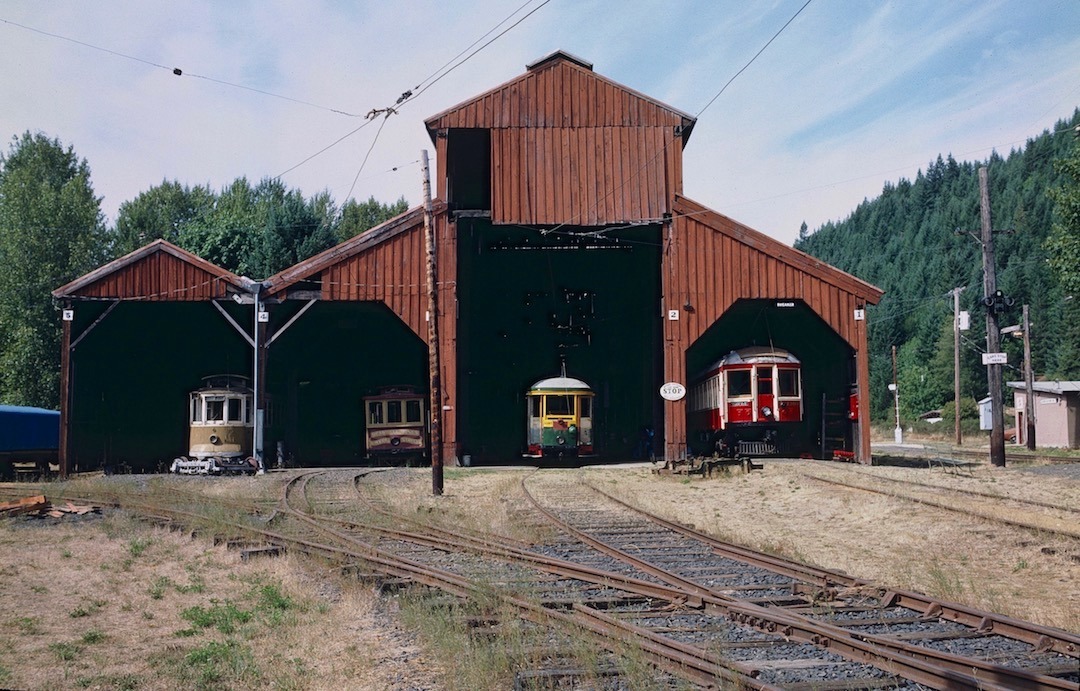
The carbarn at the old site (1959–1995), in Glenwood, known as the Trolley Park

The original museum opened in Glenwood, about 40 miles (64 km) west of Portland, in 1959, with the first operation of streetcars taking place in 1963 and regular operation in 1966. Located a short distance off of Oregon Highway 6, it was named Glenwood Electric Railway "Trolley Park" or, more commonly, the Trolley Park, but its formal name in later years was the same as that of the present museum. The Glenwood museum was built on the site of a former steam logging railroad, and OERHS re-equipped the former sawmill building of the Consolidated Timber Company as a four-track carbarn. The museum property occupied about 26 acres (11 ha), and trolley cars were able to operate on a 1.7-mile (2.7 km) line.

Operation at the Glenwood site ended in autumn 1995.

=== Current operations ===
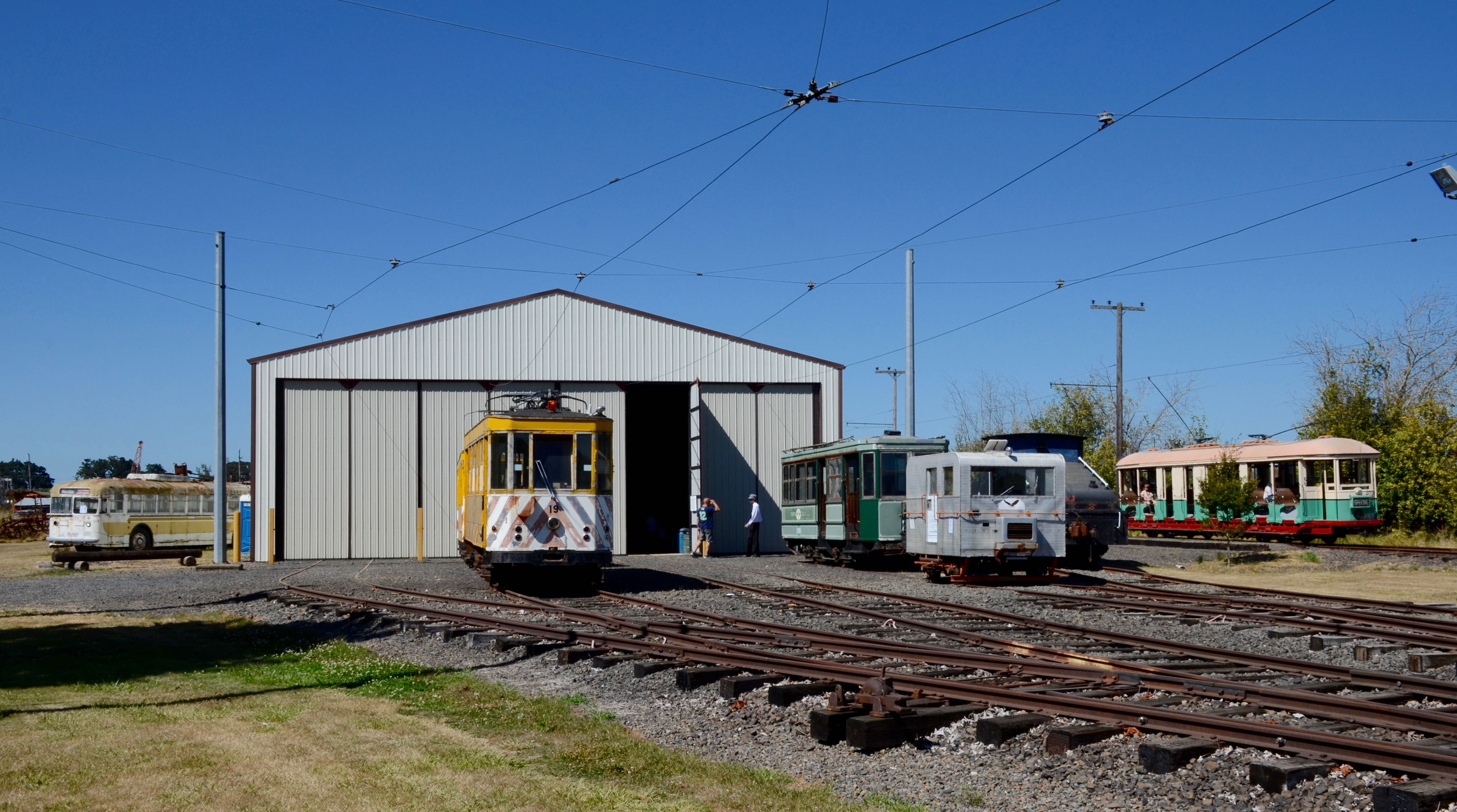
Carbarn at Brooks (2016)

The current museum opened in Brooks in 1996. The museum consists of about one mile of mainline track with overhead wire. There is a four-track carbarn to store part of the international collection of streetcars.

The museum is open from May through October with trolley operations on Saturdays. The big event of the year is the annual Steam-Up, held on the last weekend of July and the first weekend of August. Thousands of riders use the trolley during these two weekends.

== Collection ==
Rolling stock at the Oregon Electric Railway Museum
No.	Image	Type	Mfr.	Built	Service	Acquired	Notes	Refs.
503		Streetcar (Council Crest)	Brill	1904	Portland Railway, Light and Power Company		One of the two Portland "Council Crest" Brill cars, No. 503, was loaned to San Francisco in 1983, and again in 1985, for operation in the San Francisco Historic Trolley Festival, predecessor of the F Market & Wharves heritage streetcar line. In the late 1980s, Portland's transit agency, Tri-Met, used cars 503 and 506 as the models for new replica-vintage streetcars it was planning to purchase for use on the then-planned Portland Vintage Trolley service. Four faux-vintage Council Crest cars were eventually built by the Gomaco Trolley Company.	
506		Streetcar (Council Crest)	Brill	1904	Portland Railway, Light and Power Company	1975		
813		Streetcar ("Master Unit")	Brill	1932	Portland Railway, Light and Power Company		Renumbered to 4012 after regauging from narrow to standard gauge for Portland-Oregon City interurban line in 1949–50.	
1067		Interurban	Milwaukie Shops	1907	Portland Railway, Light and Power Company	1981	One of two donated to museum in 1981; the other (#1065) was scrapped. Both had been stripped for use as cabins at Cannon Beach since 1946.	
48		Double-decker tram	Blackpool Tramway	1928	Blackpool Tramway	1964	Double-decker 48 ran on the Willamette Shore Trolley line in Portland before it was retired in 2004 and moved to the museum in 2006. Returned to service in 2017.	
1187		O-class tram	Meadowbank Manufacturing Company	1912	Sydney Tramways	1959	Provides most of current revenue operations.	
210		Streetcar	CCFP Company Shops	1940	Companhia Carris de Ferro do Porto (CCFP)	2006	Single-truck car; renumbered to 201 in 1994, at time of retirement from service.	
74		Streetcar (Birney)	American Car Company	1919	Fresno Traction Company			
326		Streetcar (Birney)			Tacoma Railway and Power Company			
1318		Streetcar	St. Louis Car Company	1923	Los Angeles Railway			
1118		Streetcar (PCC)	St. Louis Car Company	1946	San Francisco Muni			
1159		Streetcar (PCC)	St. Louis Car Company	1946	San Francisco Muni		Originally built for St. Louis Public Service as car #1726.	
1213		US SLRV	Boeing-Vertol	1977	San Francisco Muni	2000	Originally numbered 1221, one of two prototypes to operate with a trolley pole; later fitted with a pantograph and renumbered to 1213.	
12		Double-decker tram	Hong Kong Tramways	1952	Hong Kong Tramways	1999	Retired in 1985 and exhibited at Expo 86 in Vancouver, BC.	
1455		Snow sweeper	McGuire	1899	Portland Railway, Light and Power Company		Originally built for East Side Railway; transferred to Oregon Water Power and Railway in 1902, and renumbered to 102 at that time, then to 1455 by PRL&P in 1906. Retired in 1954.	
21		Steeple-cab locomotive	General Electric	1912	Oregon Electric Railway	2017		
254		Steeple-cab locomotive	General Electric	1916	Great Falls Reduction Department		Last used by the Anaconda Copper Mining Company	
351		Steeple-cab locomotive	General Electric	1903	Missoula Street Railway		Last used by the Anaconda Copper Mining Company	
401		Steeple-cab locomotive	Baldwin-Westinghouse	1912	Timber Butte Milling Company		Last used by the Anaconda Copper Mining Company	
604		Trolleybus	Twin Coach	1940	Seattle Metro	c. 1970s		
648		Trolleybus	Pullman-Standard	1944	Seattle Metro	2000	Removed from collection in 2018.	
2411		Trolleybus	CCF-Brill	1954	British Columbia Electric Railway	2002		
19		Streetcar (work cars)	Les Tramways Bruxellois	1934	Brussels, Belgium	2015	Moved to the museum from storage in Port Mellon, British Columbia in 2015. Originally built as passenger cars and converted to work service in the 1970s.	
25		Streetcar (work cars)	Les Tramways Bruxellois	1934	Brussels, Belgium	2015	Moved to the museum from storage in Port Mellon, British Columbia in 2015. Originally built as passenger cars and converted to work service in the 1970s.	
26		Streetcar (work cars)	Les Tramways Bruxellois	1934	Brussels, Belgium	2015	Moved to the museum from storage in Port Mellon, British Columbia in 2015. Originally built as passenger cars and converted to work service in the 1970s.	
31		Streetcar (work cars)	Les Tramways Bruxellois	1934	Brussels, Belgium	2015	Moved to the museum from storage in Port Mellon, British Columbia in 2015. Originally built as passenger cars and converted to work service in the 1970s.	
34		Streetcar (work cars)	Les Tramways Bruxellois	1934	Brussels, Belgium	2015	Moved to the museum from storage in Port Mellon, British Columbia in 2015. Originally built as passenger cars and converted to work service in the 1970s.	
1247		Streetcar (work cars)	Les Tramways Bruxellois	1937	Brussels, Belgium	2015	Moved to the museum from storage in Port Mellon, British Columbia in 2015. Originally built as passenger cars and converted to work service in the 1970s.	
1048		Streetcar (passenger)		1937	Brussels, Belgium	2015	Moved to the museum from storage in Port Mellon, British Columbia in 2015. Originally built as #1608. Retired in 1975, it was sold in 1984 to the Grand Cypress Resort, a then-new 930-acre (380 ha) resort near Orlando, Florida, where a streetcar line opened in 1985 to carry guests around the vast property. The 3.5-mile (5.6 km) streetcar line closed in the mid-1990s, and two of its cars were eventually moved to B.C. after being acquired by the owner of the other ex-Brussels streetcars now at OERM.	
2190		Trailer (passenger)		1931	Brussels, Belgium	2015	Moved to the museum from storage in Port Mellon, British Columbia in 2015. History similar to # 1048.	
7020		Streetcar (PCC)	La Brugeoise	1952	Brussels, Belgium	2015	Retired in the 2000s.	
96		Interurban		1930	Milan, Italy	2016	Acquired from Issaquah Valley Trolley	
101		Light rail vehicle (LRV)	Bombardier	1983	Portland TriMet MAX Light Rail	2025	Moved to the OERM on July 17, 2025.	

== See also ==
- Heritage streetcar
- Oregon Electric Railway – unrelated to the museum but similar in name
- Streetcars in North America
