= Oregon Electric Railway Historical Society =

Historical society for Oregon's electric trolleys

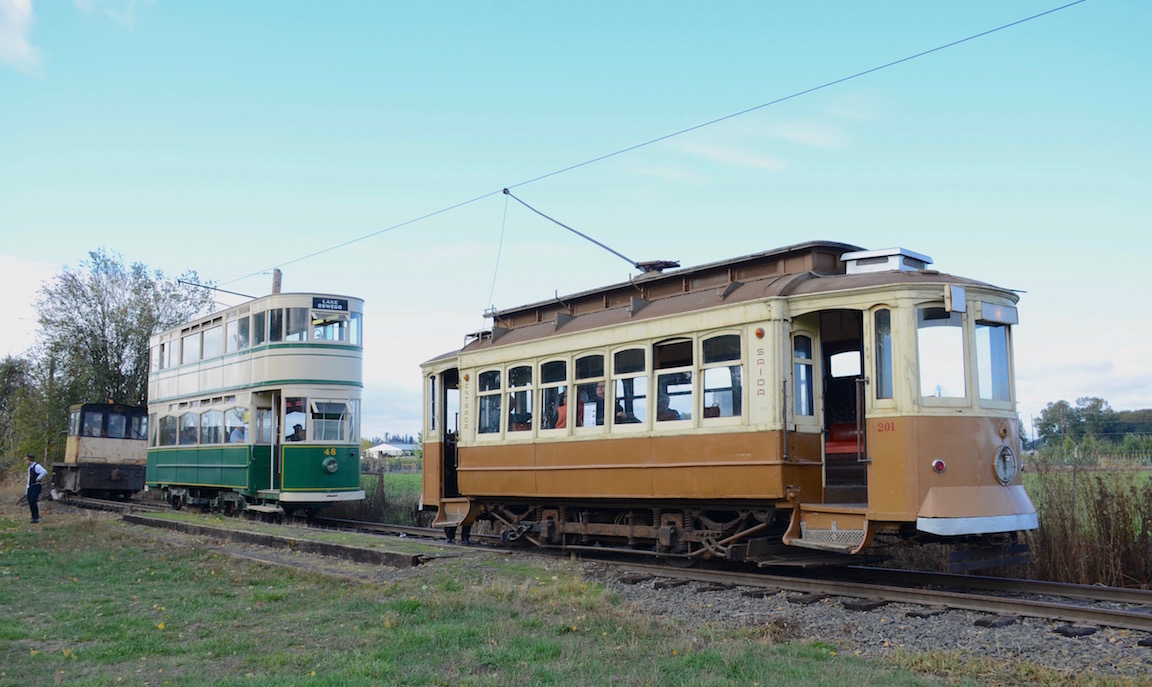
Two of the OERHS's streetcars in operation at its museum, in Brooks, Oregon. Double-decker No. 48 has been in the group's collection since 1964.

The Oregon Electric Railway Historical Society (OERHS) is a non-profit organization in the U.S. state of Oregon, founded in 1957. It owns and operates a railroad museum for electric railroad and streetcar enthusiasts, and also operates (but does not own) a separate heritage streetcar line, the Willamette Shore Trolley.

== History ==
The group was founded in 1957, and is named in honor of the Oregon Electric Railway, a former interurban electric rail line in the Willamette Valley. OERHS operated a streetcar museum known as Trolley Park in Glenwood, Washington County, Oregon from 1966 to 1995. The Trolley Park museum was formally named the Oregon Electric Railway Museum, and it retained the latter name when it moved in 1996 from Glenwood to Brooks, Oregon.

== Operations ==
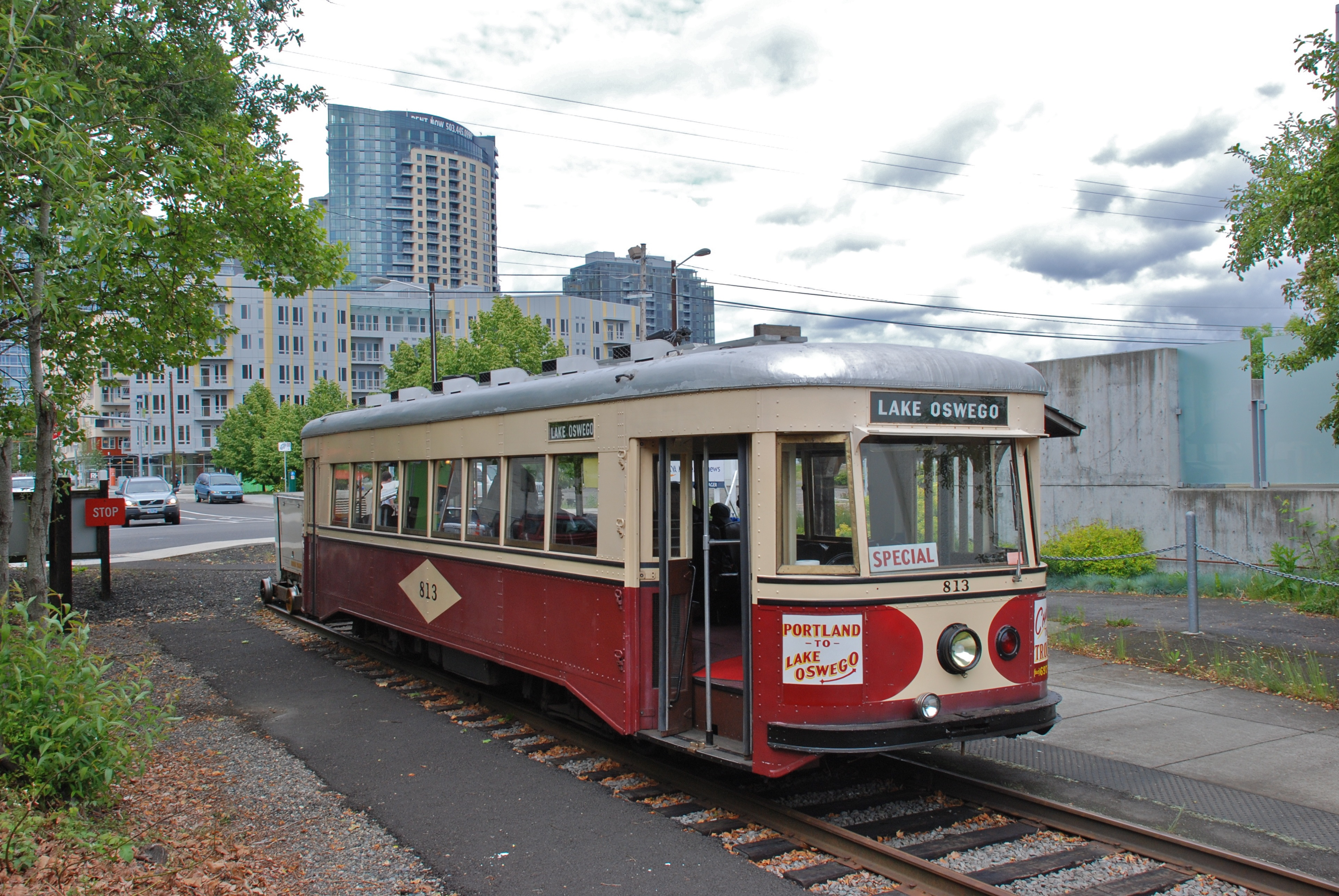
From 1996 until 2010, this OERHS-owned streetcar, built in 1932 for Portland, served the Willamette Shore Trolley line.

The OERHS currently operates the Willamette Shore Trolley between Portland and Lake Oswego, as well as the Oregon Electric Railway Museum in Brooks. The museum is on the grounds of Powerland Heritage Park, located just west of Interstate-5.

== Collection ==
The OERHS collection includes two former-Portland "Council Crest" Brill streetcars, built in 1904. Other vintage streetcars at the museum include an open-sided car from Sydney, Australia; double-deckers from Blackpool, England, and Hong Kong; and two 1940s PCC streetcars from San Francisco. The 1912-built Australian streetcar was one of OERHS's first acquisitions, in 1959, but most of the collection comes from U.S. transit systems and railroads.

Although mostly concerned with preserving streetcars and electric railway equipment, the OERHS has also collected a modern Boeing-Vertol US SLRV Light-Rail Vehicle from San Francisco Muni, and has acquired three vintage trolley buses. The entire collection is based in Brooks, but there have been periods when one or two of the group's streetcars were based in Portland or Lake Oswego, for use on the Willamette Shore Trolley line (WST). The last OERHS-owned trolley car to have been used on the WST line, ex-Portland Traction Company Brill "Master Unit" No. 813 (operated on the WST 1996–2010), was moved back to the Oregon Electric Railway Museum in Brooks in 2012.

== See also ==
- List of heritage railroads in the United States
- Portland Vintage Trolley
