= Portland and Willamette Valley Railway =

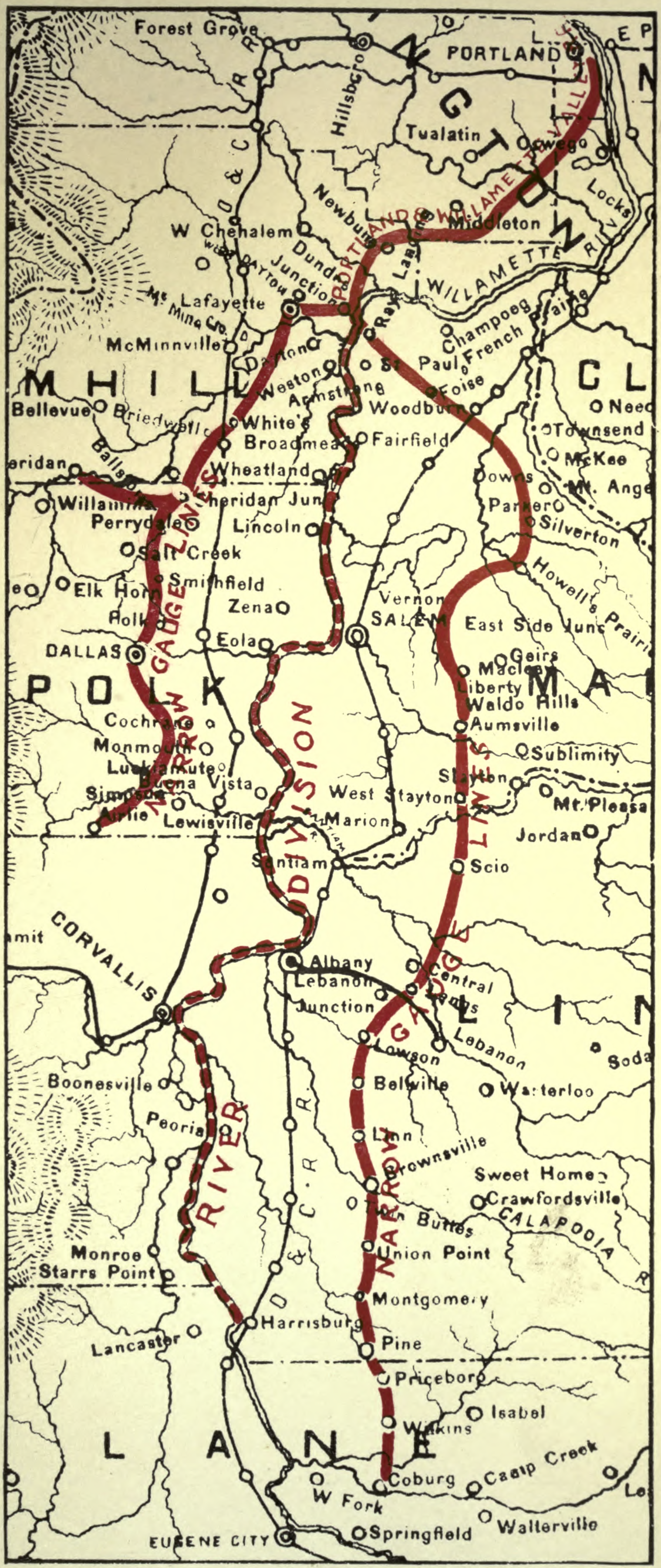
Narrow-gauge rail in the Willamette Valley in 1919

The Portland and Willamette Valley Railway was incorporated on 19 January 1885 to continue construction of a 3 ft (914 mm) narrow-gauge railroad line between Portland and Dundee, Oregon, United States, which had been started a few years earlier by the Oregonian Railway. The line was opened on 31 December 1886 and the first timetables were published the following day; however, the line did not reach Portland until 23 July 1888, due to disputes over the right-of-way. The railroad company ran this line until it fell into receivership on 2 February 1892.

On 5 August 1892, the line was leased to a Southern Pacific Railroad subsidiary, the Portland and Yamhill Railroad, which ran the 3 ft (914 mm) narrow-gauge line for another year. The railroad was later taken over entirely by the Oregon and California Railroad, another Southern Pacific Railroad subsidiary, on 1 August 1893 and was converted to 4 ft 8 1/2 in (1,435 mm) standard gauge that same year.

The Portland and Willamette Valley Railway's main line became the Southern Pacific's Newberg branch. The Willamette Shore Trolley runs on a part of that Dundee–Portland line, between Lake Oswego and Portland. The Portland and Western Railroad operates freight service south of Lake Oswego.
