= Issaquah station =

- Issaquah Depot
- U.S. National Register of Historic Places
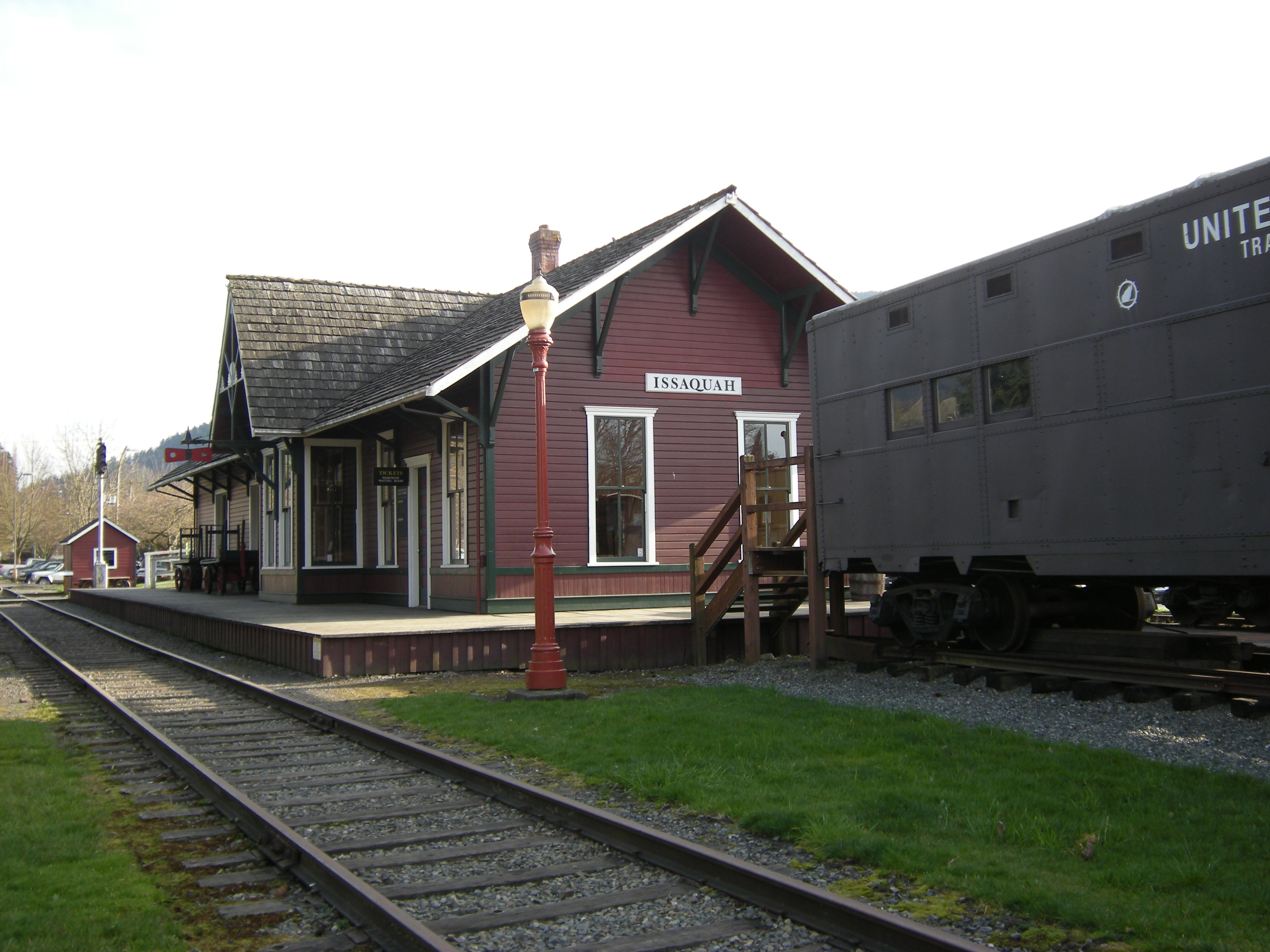
- Issaquah Depot in 2009

- Location within Washington (state)
- Location: 78 1st Ave NW, Issaquah, WA 98027
- Coordinates: 47°31′51.8″N 122°2′7.5″W
- Area: less than one acre
- Built: 1889
- Architectural style: Vernacular depot
- NRHP reference No.: 90001461
- Added to NRHP: September 13, 1990

Issaquah station, also known as Issaquah Depot or the Seattle, Lake Shore and Eastern Railway Depot, is a former railway station located in Issaquah, Washington, listed on the National Register of Historic Places. It was built in 1889 as a passenger station and freight warehouse for the Seattle, Lake Shore and Eastern Railway (SLS&E), serving what was then known as Gilman, Washington (and as Squak Valley until 1888). The town was renamed Issaquah around the turn of the century. Only a few years after the depot's opening, in the 1890s, the SLS&E was taken over by the Northern Pacific Railway.

The Issaquah Depot's use as a passenger station ended in the 1940s, and Northern Pacific abandoned the building in 1962.

The City of Issaquah purchased the building in 1984. Restoration began in 1985 and was completed in the early 1990s, and the depot now operates as a museum, managed by the non-profit Issaquah Historical Museums (formerly known as the Issaquah Historical Society). The building was added to the National Register of Historic Places in 1990.

== See also ==
- Issaquah Valley Trolley
- National Register of Historic Places listings in King County, Washington
