= Council Crest Park =

Public park in Portland, Oregon, U.S.

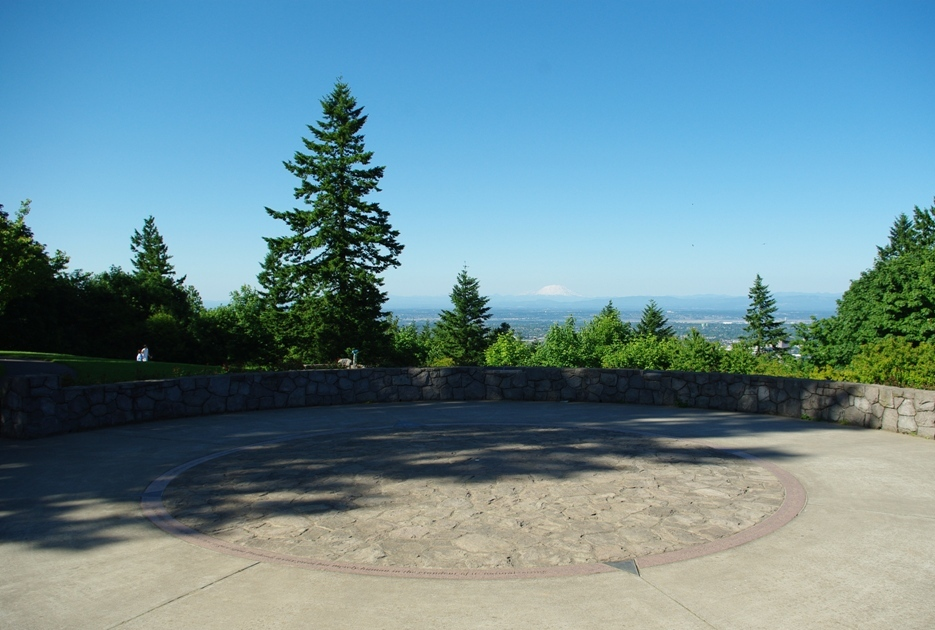
- Observation area with toposcope, Mount St. Helens in background
- Interactive map of Council Crest Park
- Type: Urban park
- Location: SW Council Crest Dr. Portland, Oregon, U.S.
- Coordinates: 45.4987°N 122.7081°W
- Area: 42.95 acres (17.38 ha)
- Operator: Portland Parks & Recreation
- Open: 5 a.m. to midnight daily

Council Crest Park is a city park in southwest Portland in the U.S. state of Oregon. Amenities include paved and unpaved paths, a dog off-leash area, picnic tables, public art, a view point, and a wedding site that can be reserved. The 43.51-acre (17.61 ha) park, operated by Portland Parks & Recreation, is open year-round from 5 a.m. to midnight. It was the site of an amusement park from 1907 until 1929.

== Description and history ==
At 1,071 feet (326 m) above sea level, Council Crest is one of the highest points in the Tualatin Mountains (West Hills) that run parallel to the Willamette River in Portland, and is well known for its views of Portland and its environs. The hill was part of a donation land claim by John B. Talbot and was first known as Talbot Mountain. Later, the hill became known as Glass Hill and then Fairmount, the name of a road that encircles it. In 1898, delegates to the Triennial National Council of Congregational Churches met on the hill and decided to name it Council Crest. A later assertion that Native Americans held councils on the summit remains unsupported by evidence.

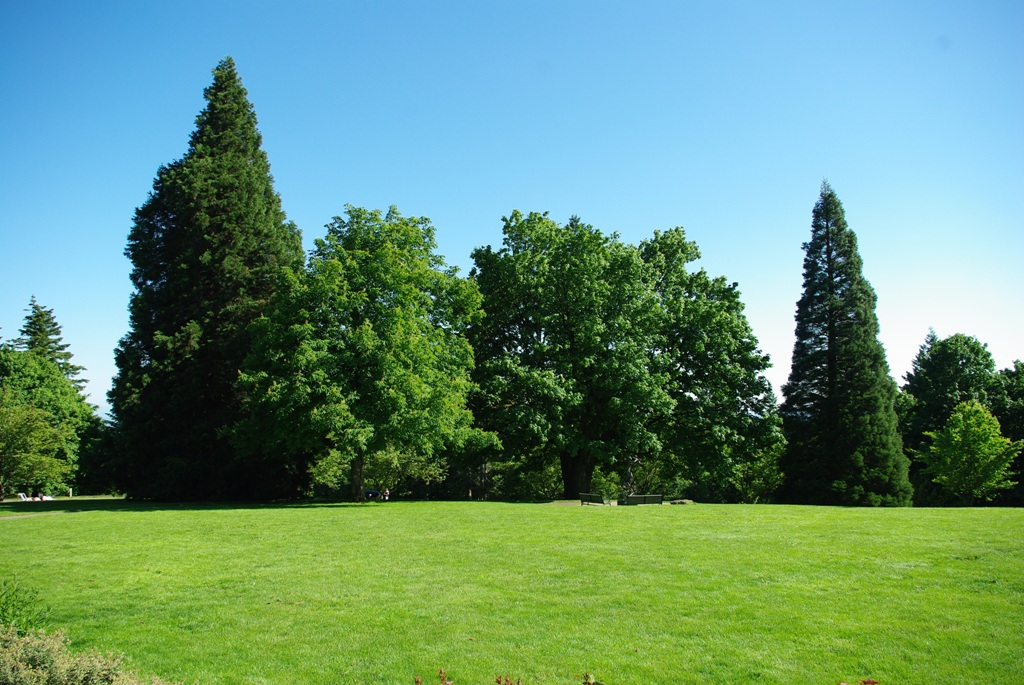
Lawn area at the park

Streetcar service to the site began on September 20, 1906, when the Portland Railway, Light and Power Company (PRL&P) opened a newly constructed streetcar loop that extended the "Portland Heights" line (later renamed the "Council Crest" line) to the summit of the hill. Soon after, in 1907, an amusement park built by PRL&P was opened, and it featured a merry-go-round, miniature railway, Ferris wheel and other entertainments, served exclusively by the streetcar line. Named Council Crest Amusement Park, it closed in 1929, and the city acquired the property in 1937.

By the time of the Portland vice scandal, the hillsides of Council Crest were frequented for gay cruising.

The amusement park's wooden observation tower was torn down in 1941 and replaced by a steel water-storage tower. Streetcar service ended on August 9, 1949, with the abandonment of the uppermost section of the Council Crest streetcar line, the service being cut back to the intersection of Vista Avenue and Patton Road. Removal of the rails along the line's private right-of-way began the next day, and a road was then built along the former rail-only right-of-way. The line had been one of the most famous and scenic trolley lines in North America. (The remainder of the Council Crest line was abandoned six months later, on February 26, 1950, with the closure of the city's last three urban streetcar lines.) Today, the Council Crest neighborhood is served by TriMet Line 51, but the bus service does not reach Council Crest Park.

One of the streetcars which had served the line, car 506, was on static display at Council Crest Park for more than 20 years, from November 1950 until 1972, when it was removed after being damaged by vandals. It was later acquired by the Oregon Electric Railway Historical Society and is preserved at that group's museum. The former streetcar line is also memorialized by replica-vintage streetcars which provided the Portland Vintage Trolley heritage service from 1991 to 2014, and on the Willamette Shore Trolley line starting in 2014. The ends of these cars display the same slogan as was displayed by the streetcars serving the Council Crest line: See Portland from Council Crest.

Although the observation tower erected in 1907 was dismantled in 1941, the city later built an observation area in the park from which it is possible to see Mount Rainier, Mount St. Helens, Mount Adams, Mount Hood, and Mount Jefferson in the Cascade Range.

The peak encompassed by the park is commonly known as the highest point within the Portland City Limits, but there are higher points just inside the city limits along Skyline Drive in NW Portland (the elevation around 414 NW Skyline Blvd. is at approximately 1160' (355m)), although those locations do not have the publicly-accessible views offered by Council Crest Park.

== See also ==
- Pioneer Woman (Littman), sculpture
- Trolley park
