= Double-decker tram =

Tram that has two levels

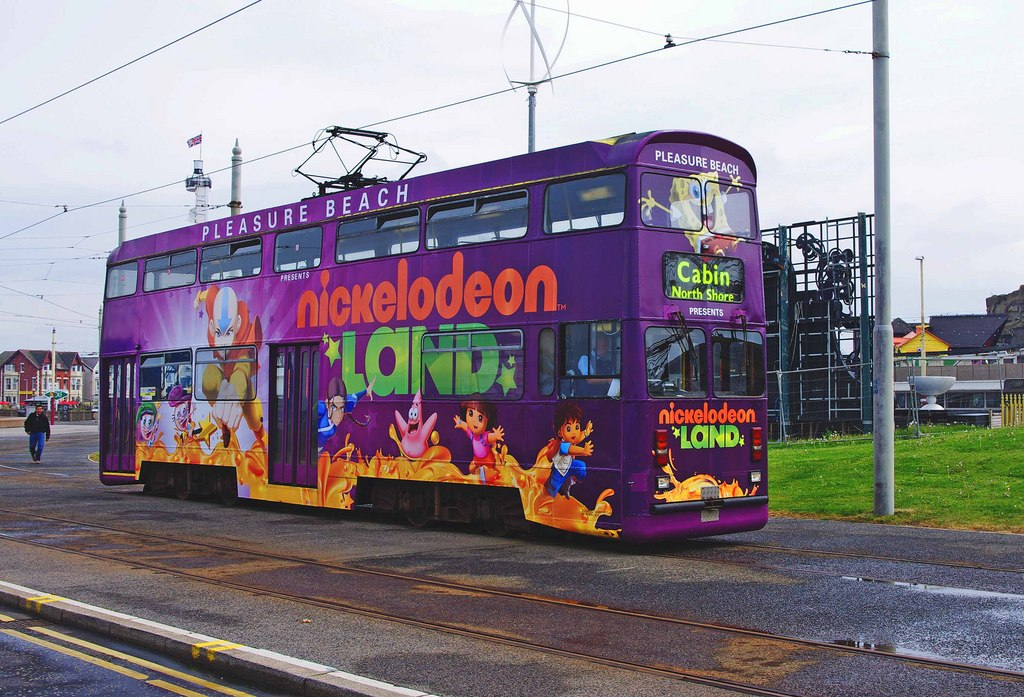
Blackpool "Jubilee" Class No. 762, the last double-deck tram built in the UK

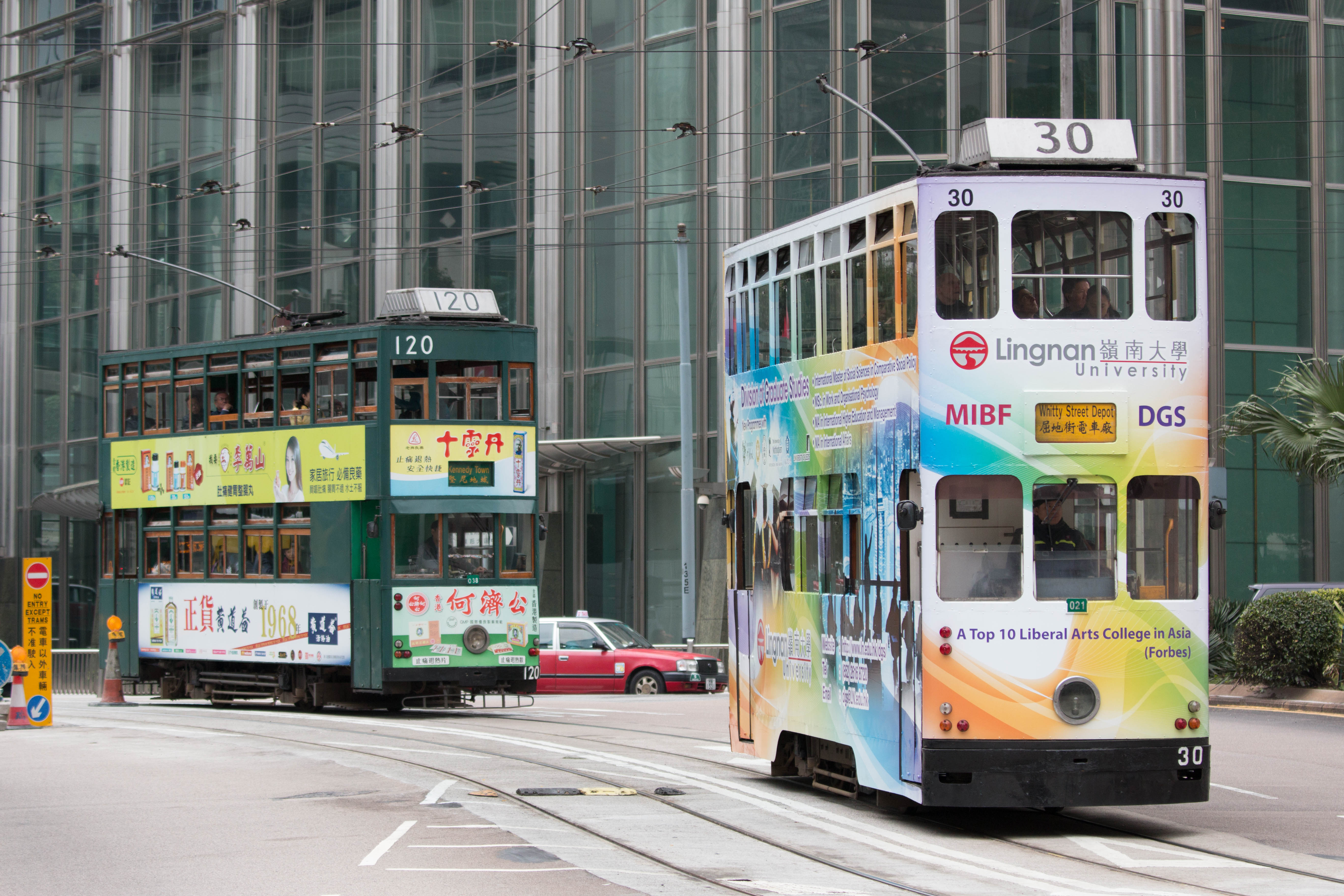
Double-decker trams in Hong Kong

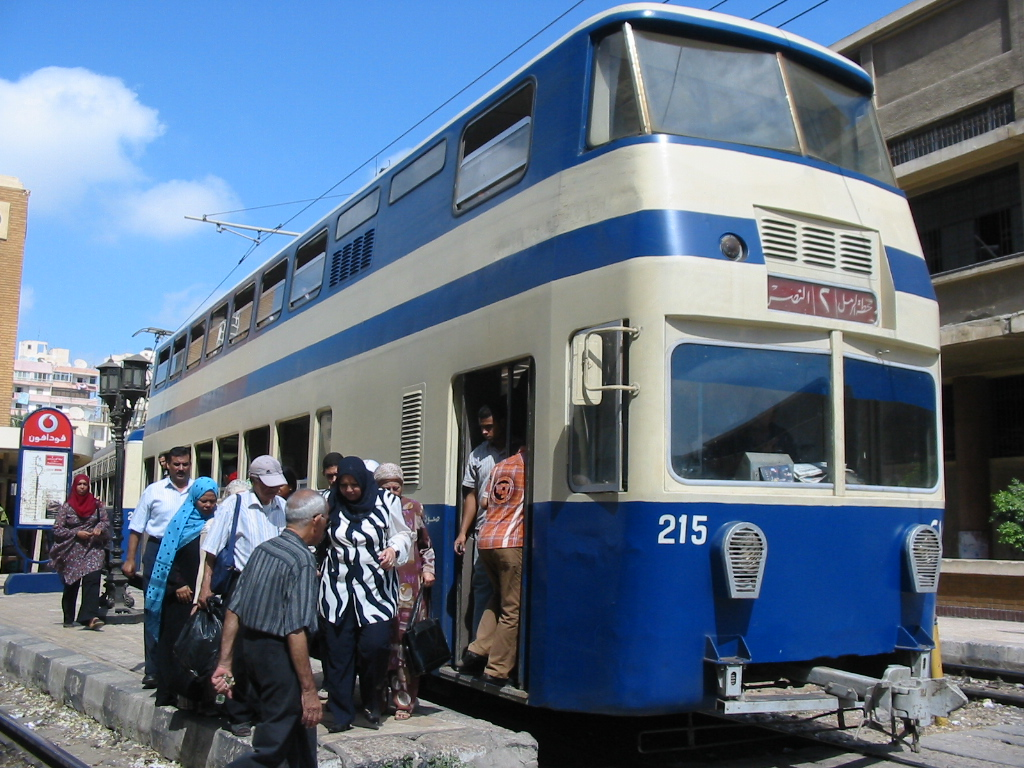
Alexandria double-deck tram

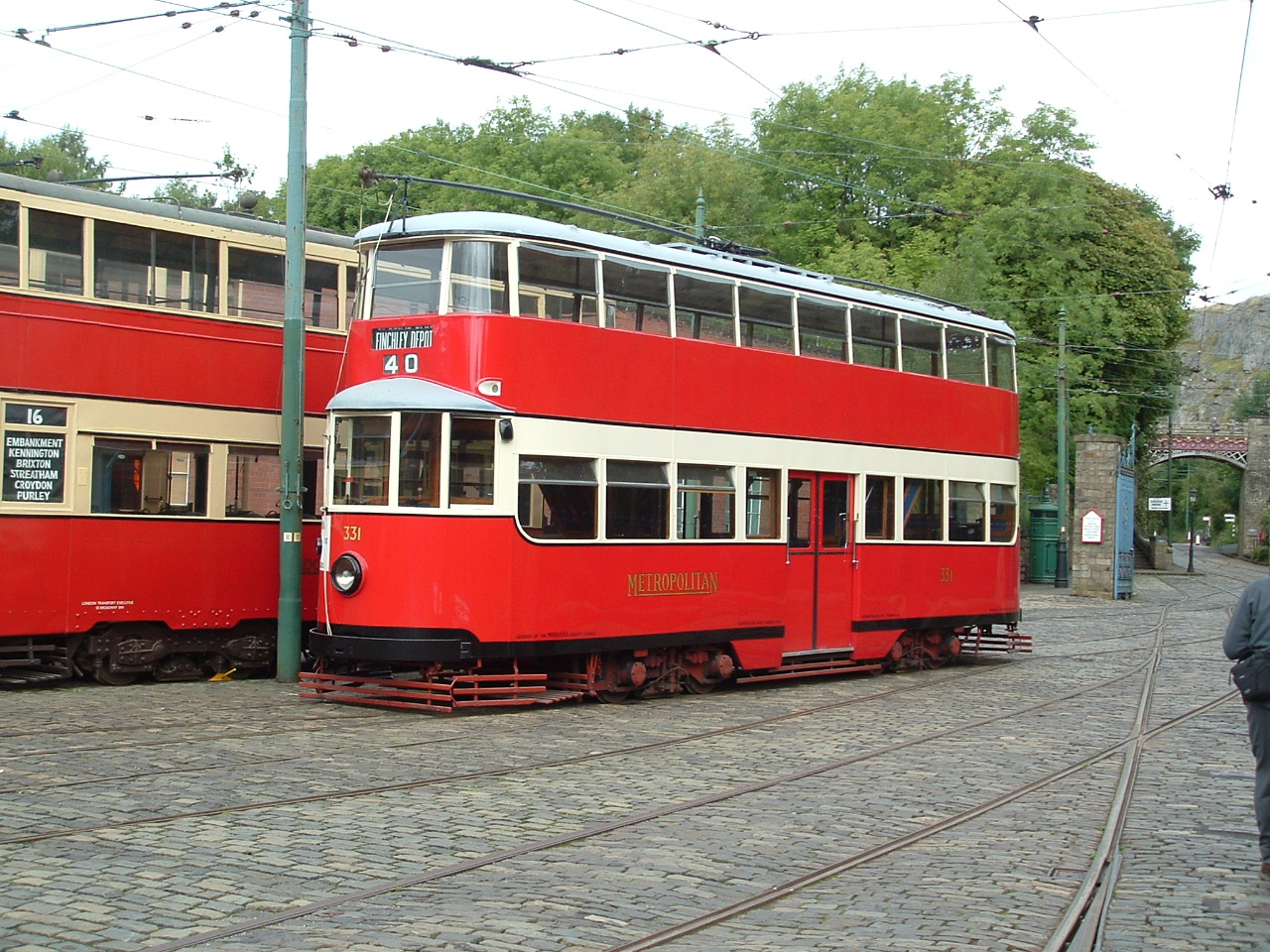
London Metropolitan Tramways "Feltham" Car No. 331. It was built in 1929 and was one of three prototypes. It was sold to Sunderland in 1937 and is now preserved at the National Tramway Museum, Crich, UK.

A double-decker tram or double-deck tram is a tram that has two levels or decks. Some double-decker trams have open tops. Double-deck trams were once popular in some European cities, like Berlin and London, throughout the British Empire countries in the early half of the 20th century including Auckland, Christchurch and Wellington in New Zealand; Hobart, Tasmania in Australia, and in parts of Asia. They are still in service or even newly introduced in Blackpool, Hong Kong and Alexandria. In other places, like Oranjestad, Birkenhead, Franschhoek, Auckland and Douglas, are still used as heritage or tourist trams.

== History ==
=== Heyday ===
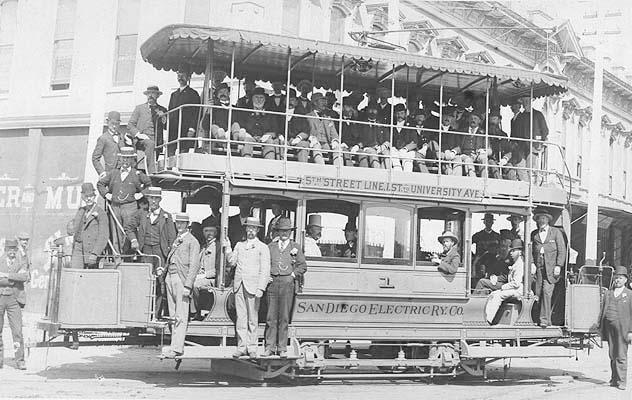
San Diego Electric Railway double-decker Car No. 1 pauses at the intersection of 5th Street & Market Street during its inaugural run on September 21, 1892.

The earliest double-deck trams were horse-drawn. The first electric double-deck trams were those built for the Blackpool Tramway in 1885, where conduit tramcar No. 4 is the sole survivor of its class and is preserved at the National Tramway Museum in Crich, UK. They were common in the United Kingdom until the 1950s. London Transport was a heavy user of double-deck trams until the system closed in 1952. Apart from the Blackpool tramway, the Glasgow Corporation Tramways was the last urban British tramway to close, in 1962.

In the United States, double-deck tramcars were used by the Pittsburgh Railways (streetcar / interurban) between 1913 and 1924, a rare use of such tramcars in the country. From 1910 to 1964, double-deck trams were in use in Mumbai, India (Brihanmumbai Electric Supply and Transport Undertaking).

They were also use in Johannesburg, South Africa, where trams were operational from 1906 to 18 March 1961. Some of the oldest trams are at the James Hall Museum of Transport.

Buenos Aires, Argentina, where trams were operational from 1942 to 1952, had a brief episode with double-decker trams of the locally built type CATITA Imperial.

=== Preservation ===
Several tramcars have been preserved at the UK's National Tramway Museum in Crich, Beamish Museum, Black Country Living Museum, East Anglia Transport Museum, Heaton Park Tramway in Manchester, Seaton Tramway, Summerlee Museum and the Wirral Transport Museum, where the cars are still in operation.

Some tramcars have been preserved at New Zealand's Ferrymead Museum in Christchurch and MOTAT Museum in Auckland, which operates restored Wellington double-deck tramcar No. 47, which operated in 1906 and also has Auckland double-deck tramcar No. 17 in storage.

In the USA, some double-decker tramcars from Great Britain and its colonies have been preserved as well. A Liverpool balloon car is preserved at the Seashore Trolley Museum at Kennebunkport, ME, still marked for its final ride as the last tram of Liverpool, as well as an older double-decker tramcar from Glasgow. Both are not operational and not on public display. The Oregon Electric Railway Museum in Brooks, OR, features a double-decker tram from Blackpool (built 1927, operational) and one from Hong Kong (built 1952, display only).

The only case of still operational historic double-decker tramcars without any connection to the British Empire are two Danish double-deckers from Frederiksberg and Copenhagen at Sporvejsmuseet Skjoldenæsholm in Jystrup, Denmark.

The Douglas Bay Horse Tramway on the Isle of Man, opened in 1876 and continuously operating since then (with the exception of WWII), still operates one of only two horse-drawn double-deck tramway cars in the world, as a heritage tramway. The other line with a horse-drawn double-decker is the Victor Harbor Tramway in Australia.

Blackpool Tramway still operates several double-deckers on weekends, of which there are several Balloon Cars from the 1930s (some of them rebuilt later) and one Standard Car from the 1920s. Hong Kong Tramways operates a very frequent service (trams run approx. every two minutes) on three routes on a main line and a side line to Happy Valley, only served with double deckers built from the 1960s to 2018.

=== 1960s ===
The last double-deck tram built in the UK was Blackpool "Jubilee" Class No. 762, which entered service in 1982. However, it was originally built in 1935 as Blackpool "Balloon" Class No. 251, later renumbered No. 714. Its rebuild as No. 762 gave it a longer body and its pointed ends were replaced with rectangular ones. It was the second and final rebuild of two Blackpool "Balloon" tramcars into "Jubilee" tramcars, following on from "Jubilee" Class No. 761. Unlike No. 761, "Jubilee" tramcar No. 762 retained its central doors as exits for improved passenger flow at stops. For these reasons, it was considered to be an entirely new tram and on this basis, when it was retired in 2011, it was gifted to the National Tramway Museum in Crich.

=== Recent cars ===
A few of the tramcars in the Alexandria tram system in Egypt are double-deckers built by Kinki Sharyo and Fuji Heavy Industries in Japan in 1975-1995. However, they are unpowered trailers that are towed/pushed by a powered tram as a steering car in a three car train.

A very special case is the Seaton Tramway, which is a tourist tram through a bird sanctuary called Wetlands and operates purpose-built double-deckers of a slightly reduced scale, besides historic single-deckers of a regular size.

In 2012, a new tram service, solely operated with double-decker cars, was opened in Franschhoek, South Africa, as the Franschhoek Wine Tram. It serves as a tourist tram connecting several wineries on eight lines (all of them partly served with so-called "tram buses", the trams only operating as a backbone) and operates on the restored tracks of an old railway line, which was opened in 1904 and closed in the 1990s. The cars were built by DCD Rolling Stock, South Africa, for the opening in 2012, but modelled after a Blackpool car from the 1920s.

A service in Dubai, the Dubai Trolley with hydrogen-fuelled double-deck trams in vintage style with an open upper deck, built by US manufacturer TIG/m, was announced in 2009 and opened in 2015 on a single-track line of 1.1 km (0.68 mi) with plans for further extension, but frequently suspended due to the heat and according to some sources finally closed by 2019, the tracks barred by poles, the depot used as a shopping center, and the only car on public display.

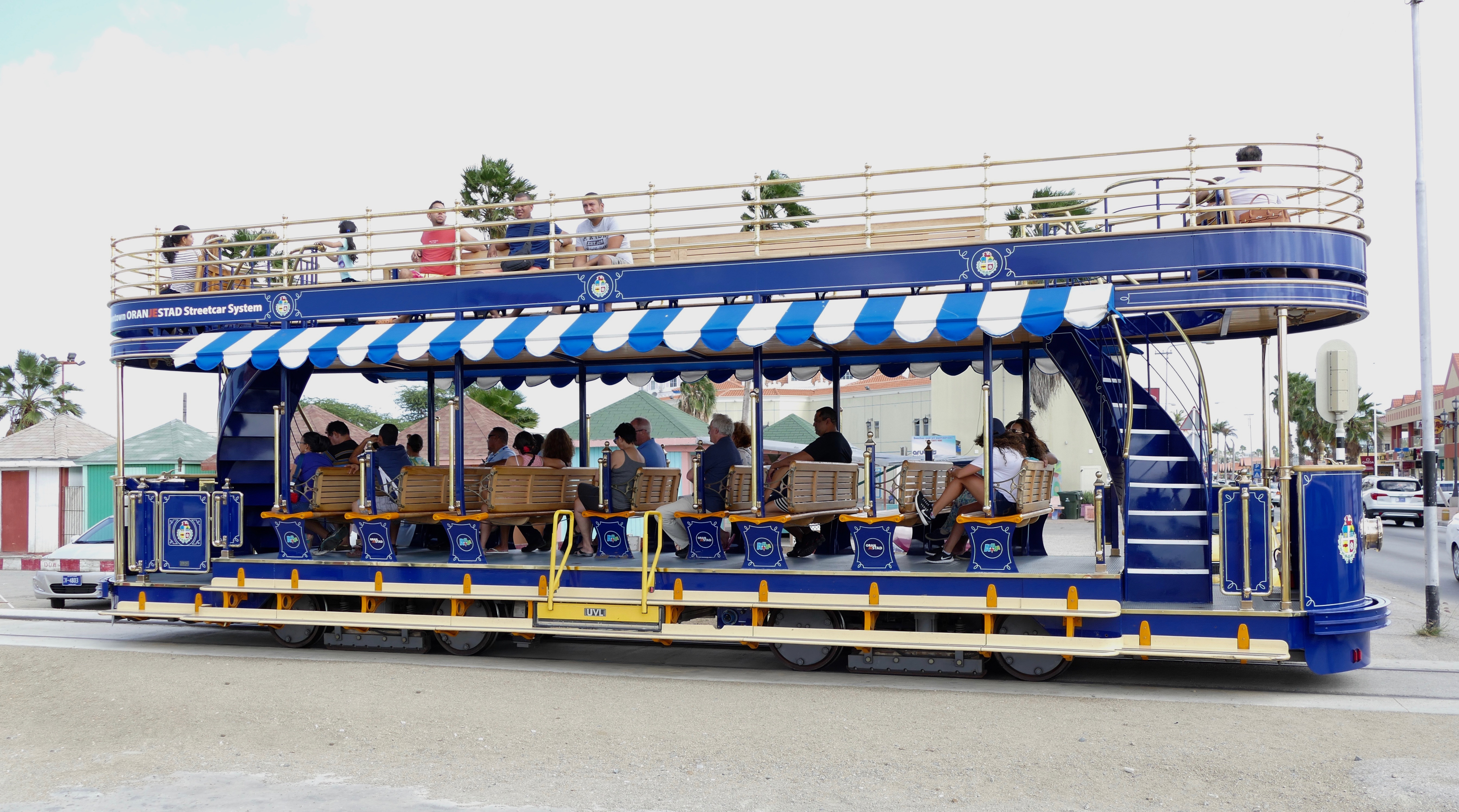
Oranjestad double-decker

The same technology by the same manufacturer was used in the four cars (two single-deckers, two double-deckers) for the new Tram of Oranjestad, Aruba, which was opened in 2012/13, and operates a daily regular service on a single-track line of 1.9 km (1.2 mi).

Especially for the open air shopping mall The Grove at Farmers Market in Los Angeles, CA, an "imagineer" from the Disney Studios created an open-top double decker for a 1.2 km (0.75 mi) line along the main street of the mall. The car is based on a Boston undercarriage from the 1950s and is powered by 50 car batteries, which are charged at night.

In 2009-2016, Hong Kong extended its fleet largely with new cars that were mainly based on the traditional exterior but showed new technological features, such as a VVVT drive and a full aluminum body.

== Manufacturers ==
- Blackpool Tramway - Standard tramcars and rebuilt English Electric tramcars
- Brush Engineering Falcon Works
- Dick, Kerr & Co.
- English Electric and United Electric Car
- Glasgow Corporation Tramways
- Hong Kong Tramways
- Rouse, Black and Son, Wellington, New Zealand
- Kinki Sharyo For Alexandria ,Egypt in 1995

== Gallery ==
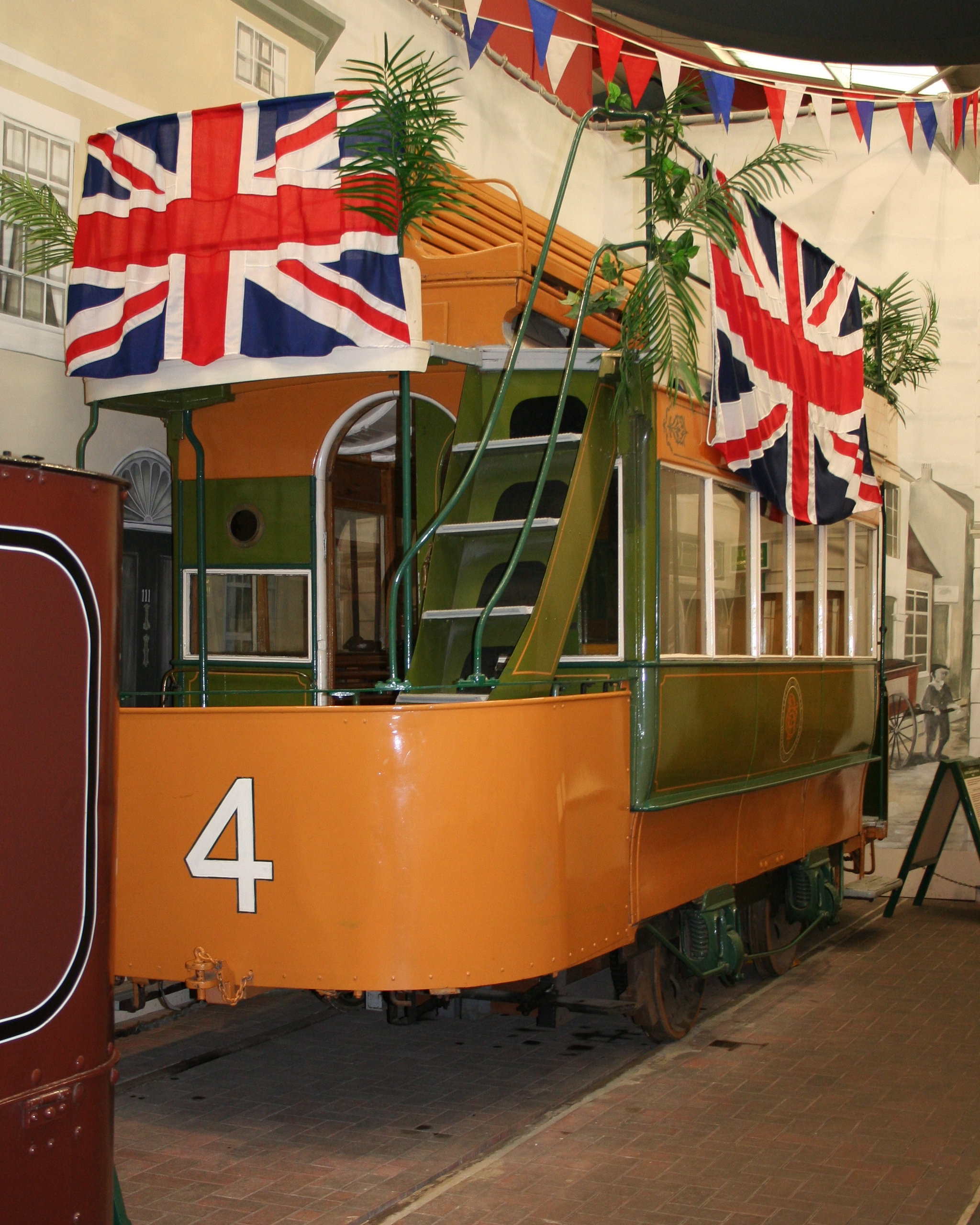
Blackpool Conduit tramcar No. 4

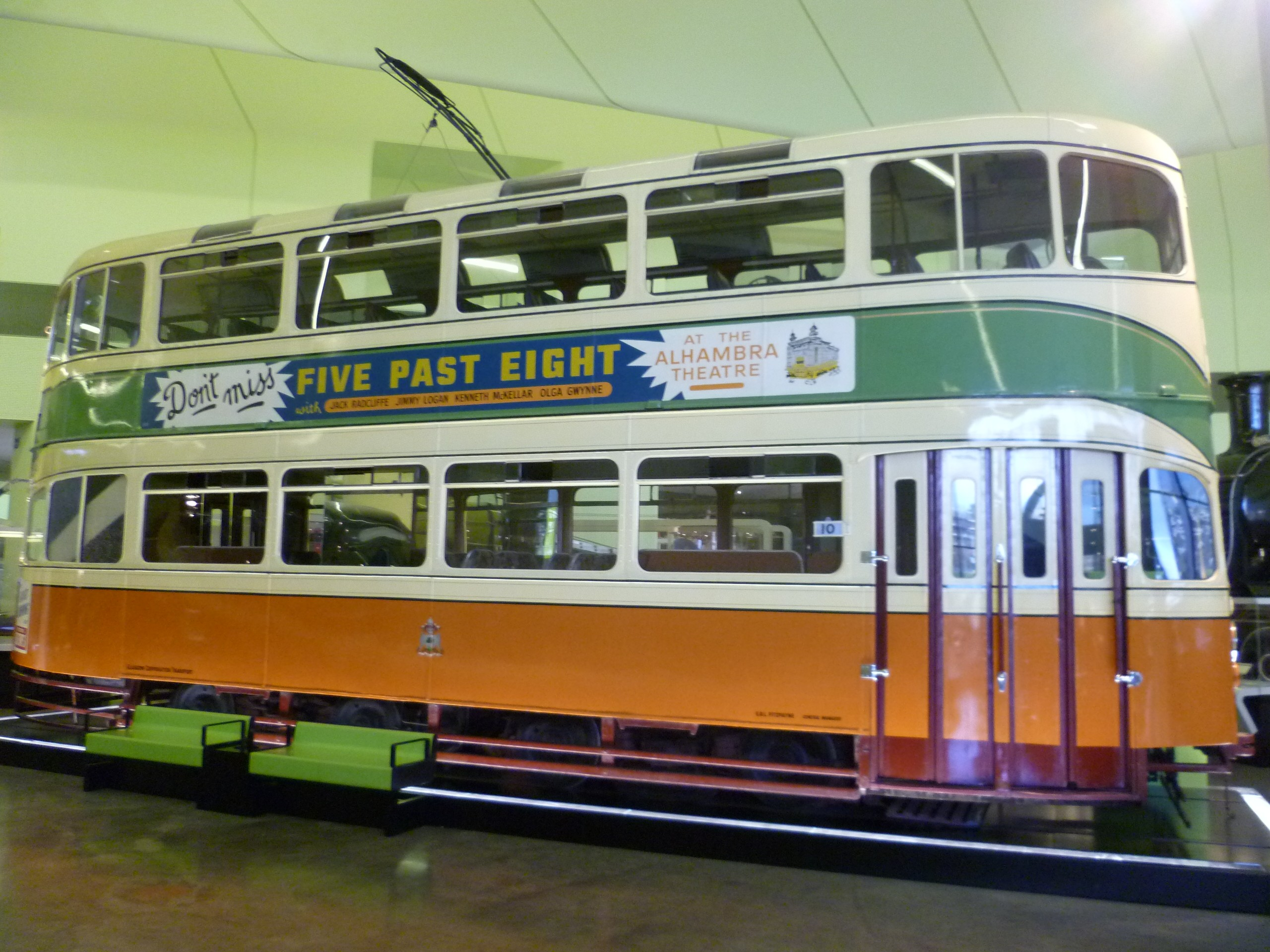
Glasgow Cunarder tramcar No. 1392

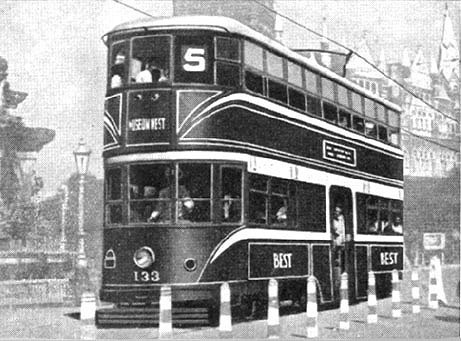
Bombay (Mumbai) tramcar No. 133

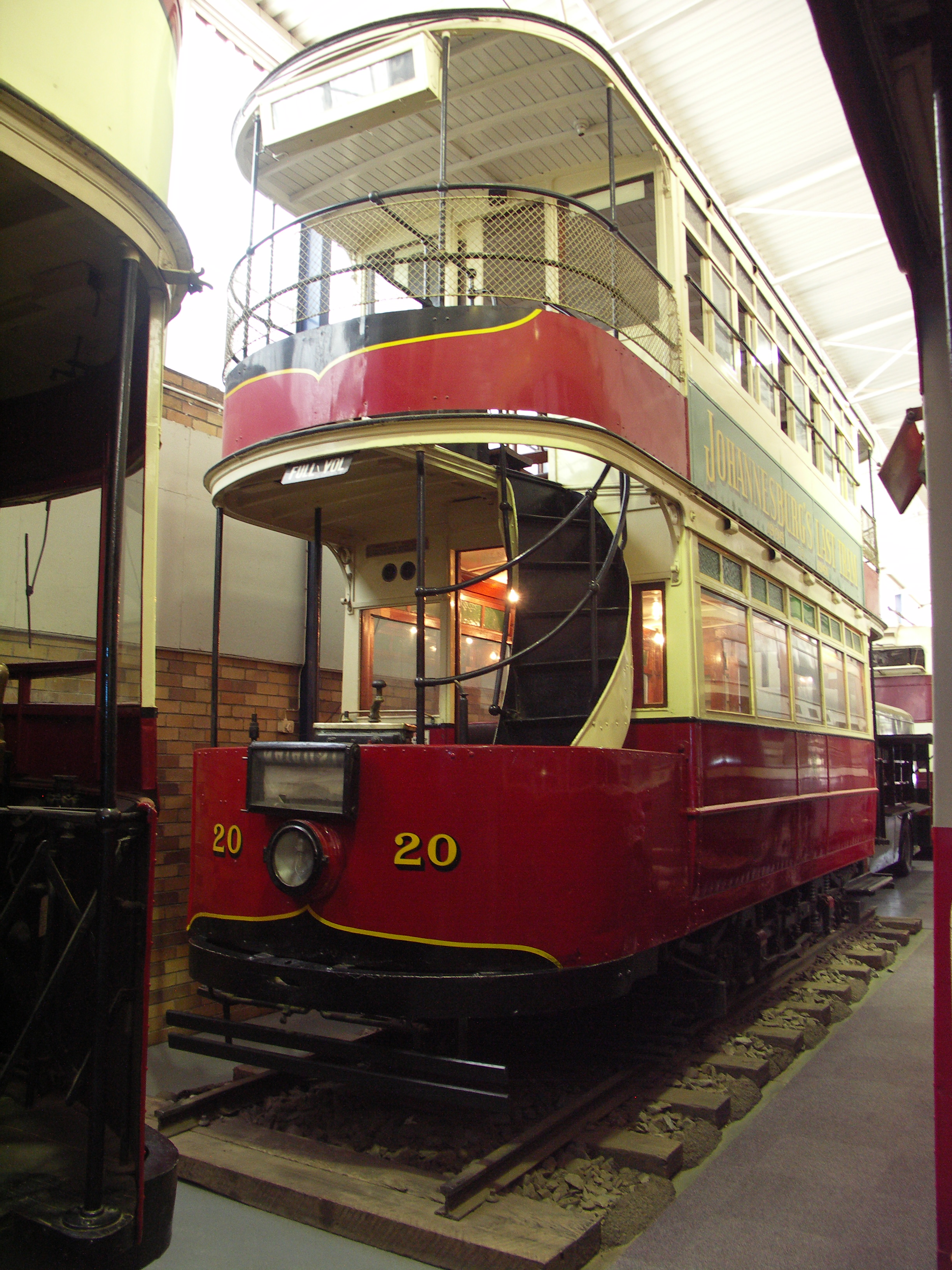
Johannesburg tramcar No. 20

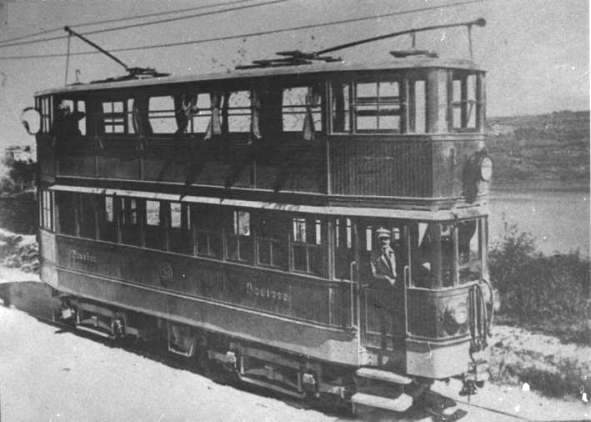
Tramways of the Roman Castles

== See also ==
- Bilevel rail car
- Double-decker bus
