= Lloyd District, Portland, Oregon =

Lloyd District
- Neighborhood
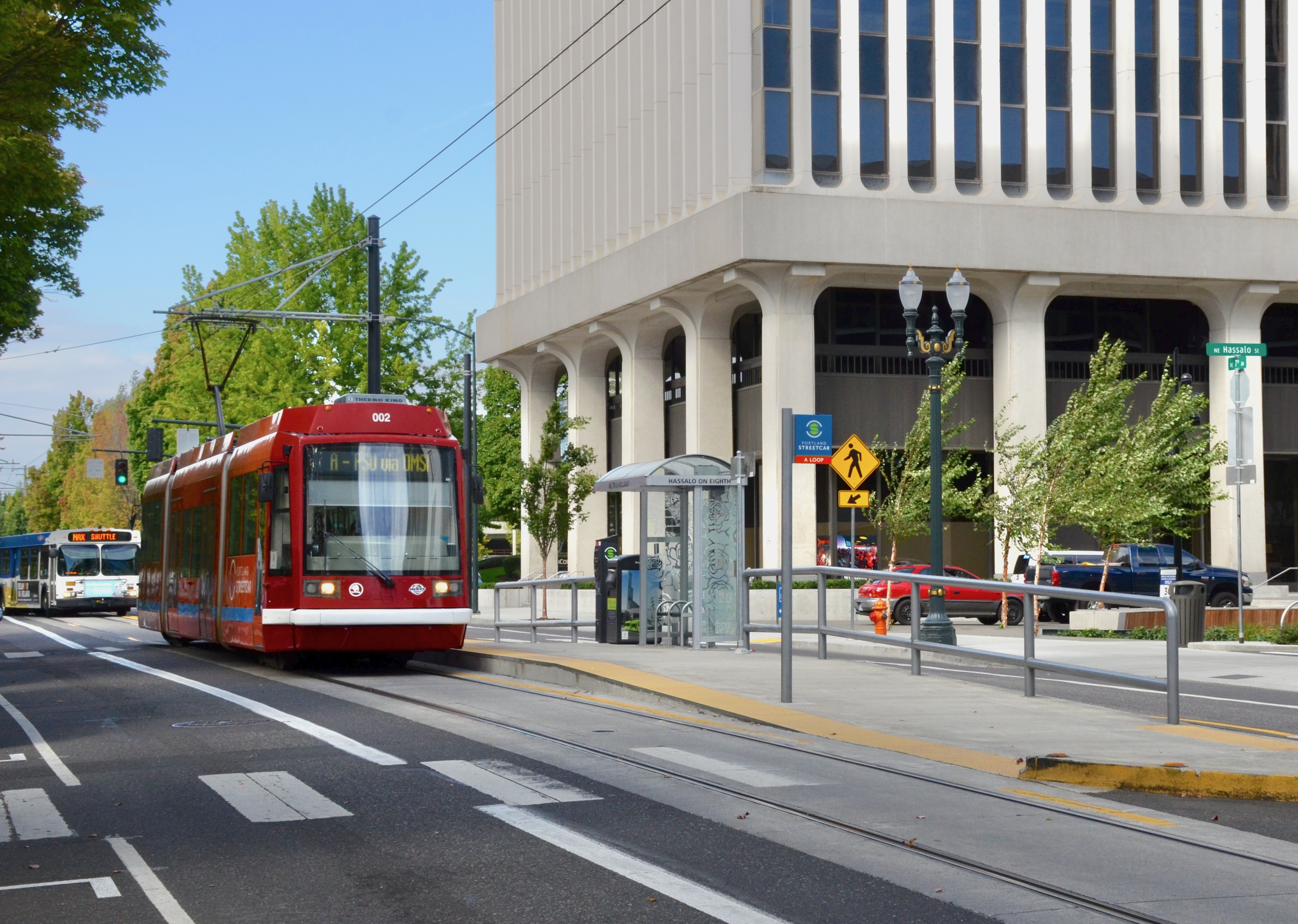
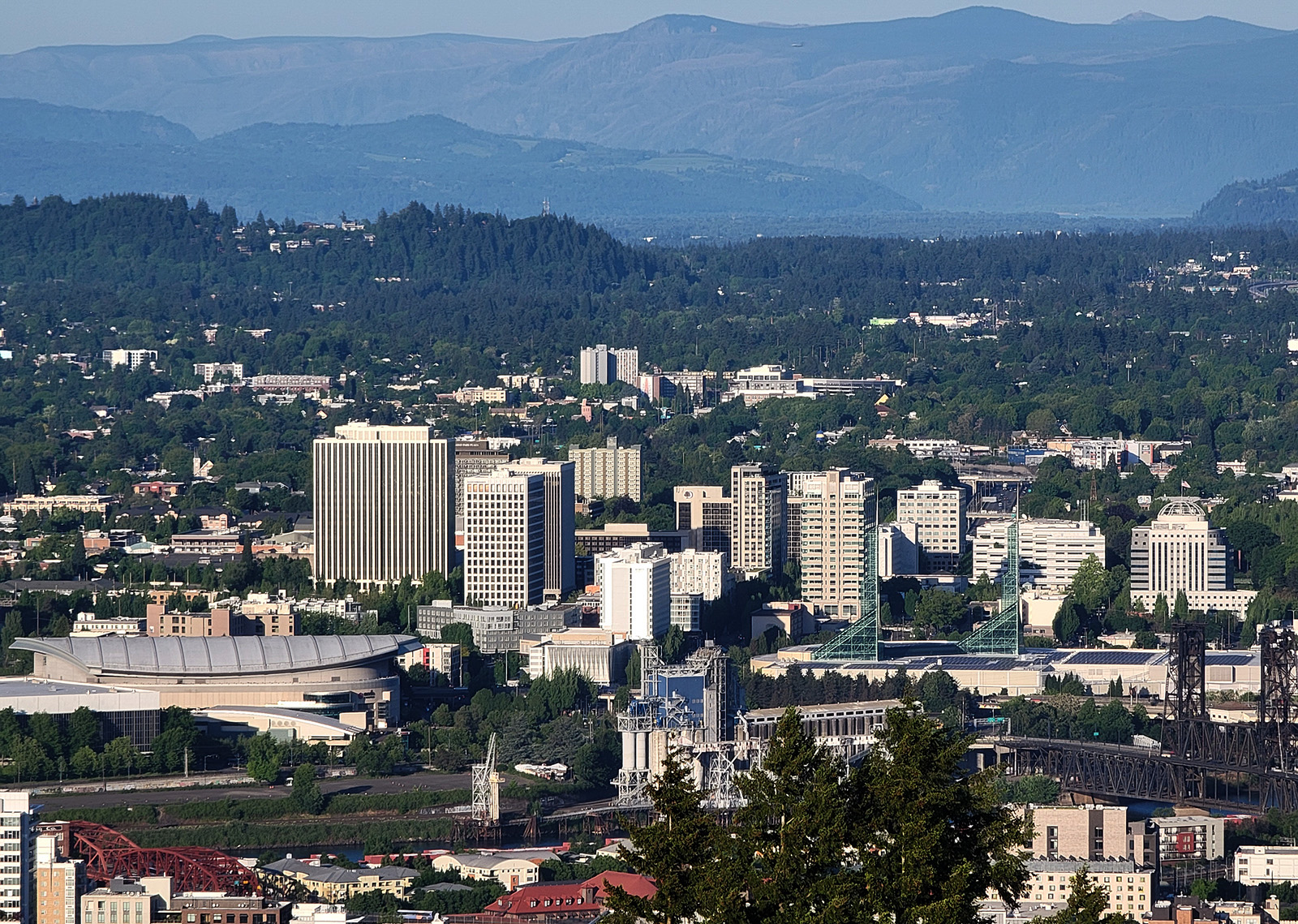
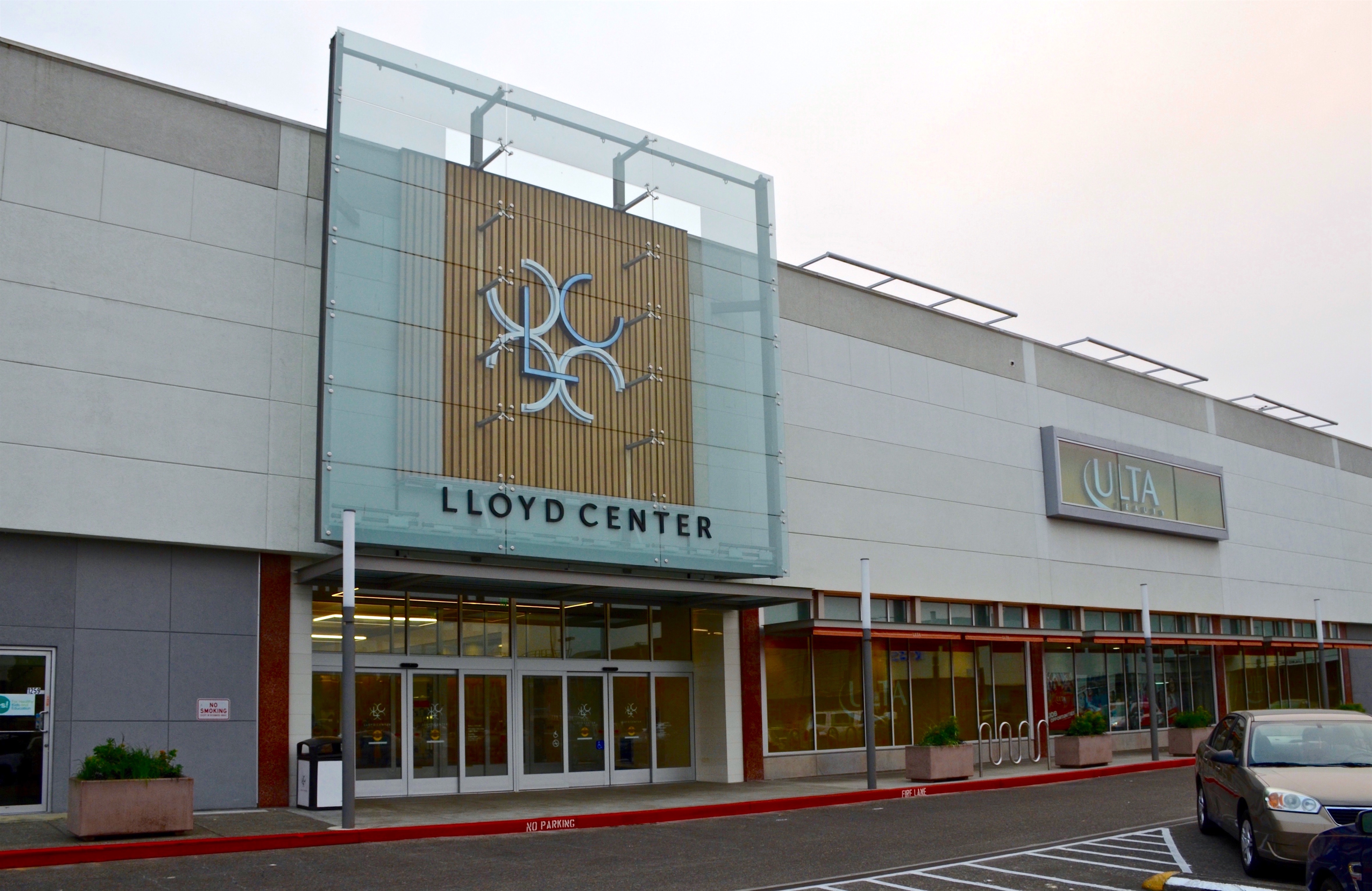
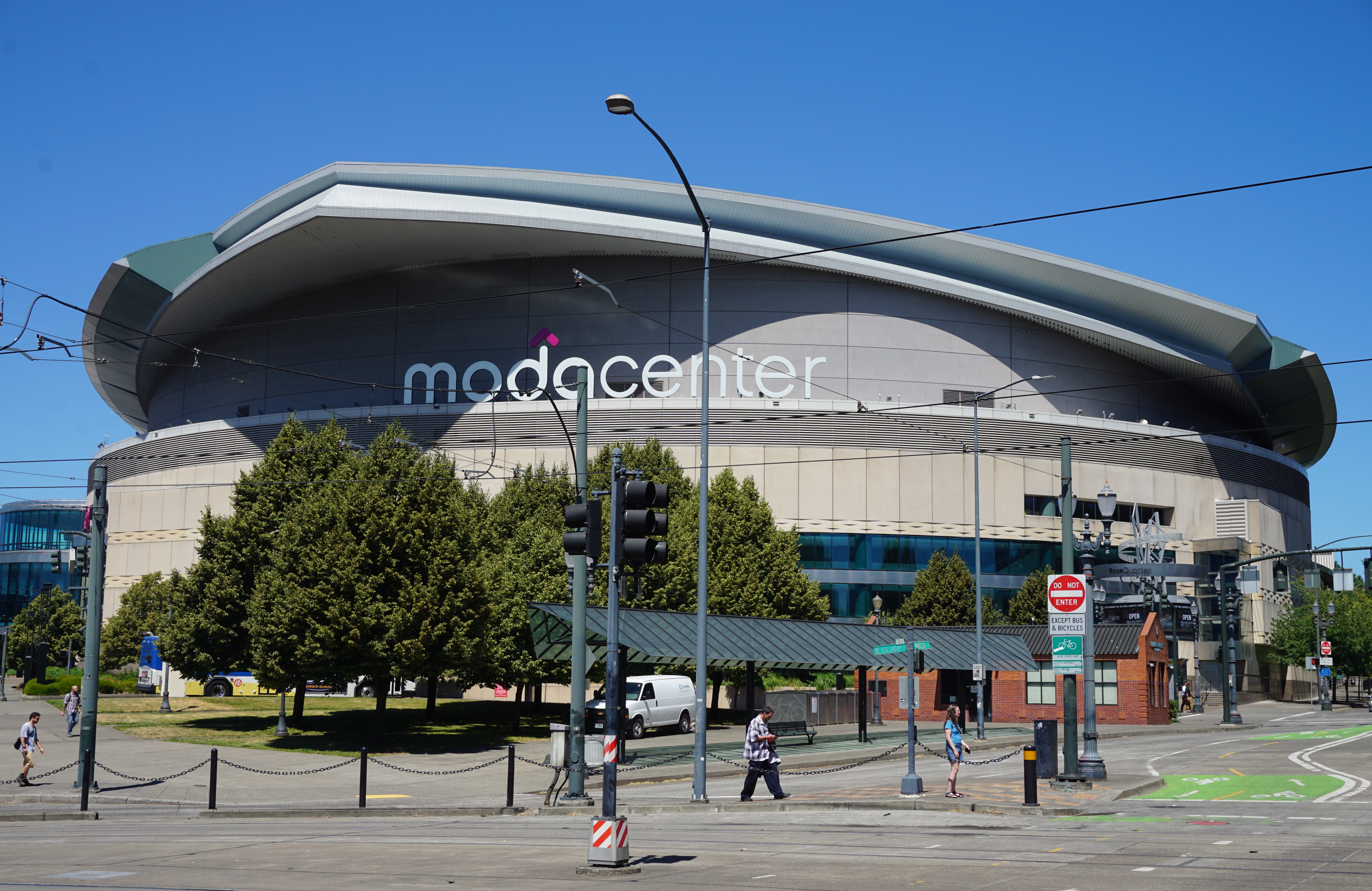
- Clockwise from top left: Streetcar on 7th Ave, Lloyd District viewed from Pittock Mansion, Moda Center, Lloyd Center entrance
- Interactive map of Lloyd District
- Coordinates: 45°31′51″N 122°39′38″W
- Country: United States
- State: Oregon
- City: Portland

Government
  - Association: Lloyd District Community Association

Area
  - Total: 0.43 sq mi (1.11 km^{2})

The Lloyd District is a primarily commercial neighborhood in the North and Northeast sections of Portland, Oregon, United States. It is named after Ralph Bramel Lloyd (1875–1953), a California rancher, oilman, and real estate developer who moved to and was an early commercial developer for the area in 1905.

== Description and history ==
The Lloyd District is bounded by the Willamette River on the west, NE Broadway on the north, NE 18th Ave. on the east, and Interstate 84 on the south. Adjacent neighborhoods are Eliot and Irvington to the north, Sullivan's Gulch (with which it slightly overlaps) on the east, Kerns on the south, and Old Town Chinatown (via the Steel and Broadway bridges over the Willamette) to the west.

The area west of Interstate 5 is called the Rose Quarter, home of the Moda Center (originally Rose Garden Arena) and Memorial Coliseum. Prior to urban renewal in the 1950s, this area was an African American residential community, including many who had lost their homes in the Vanport flood of 1948.

Most of the district lies east of I-5, where the Oregon Convention Center and Lloyd Center Mall are the principal landmarks. The area includes restaurants, shops, hotels, movie theatres, condominiums and apartments, and office buildings (the largest being the Lloyd Center Tower, standing at 20 floors and 290 feet).

The neighborhood is accessible using public transportation. TriMet buses and MAX trains provide frequent service in the district, as well as a commuter express bus route form Vancouver via C-Tran. It is served by all four lines of the MAX light rail system. Four Blue Line and Red Line stations (Rose Quarter Transit Center, Convention Center, Northeast 7th Ave, and Lloyd Center/Northeast 11th Ave) and one Yellow Line station (Interstate/Rose Quarter) are within the district. The Portland Streetcar system began serving the district in 2012, with the opening of a new east-side line, originally called the Central Loop; this was renamed the Loop Service in 2015.

From 2001 to 2012, TriMet's Fareless Square covered a narrow portion of the Lloyd District, making bus and MAX service free in the designated area (which included all four MAX stations within the district). However, free rides on buses were discontinued in January 2010, the fareless area being renamed the "Free Rail Zone", and even the free light rail service was discontinued effective September 1, 2012.

=== Redevelopment ===
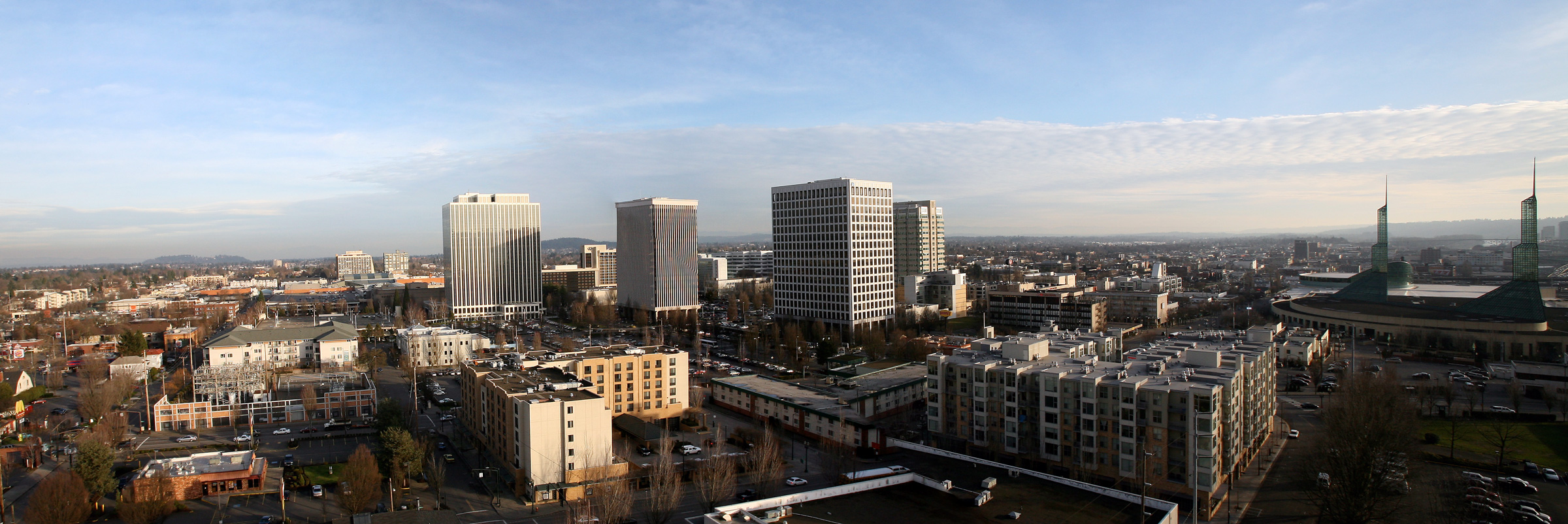
The Lloyd District viewed from the northwest.

Several high-rise apartment complexes are under construction along the Holladay Street corridor. The first development is the 657-apartment, Hassalo on Eighth, composed of three buildings on a superblock, and including over 1,000 bike parking spaces. It topped out in February 2015, and was completed in October 2015. Oregon Square, a 1,030-apartment development by American Assets Trust, is under consideration for across Holladay on the site of several low-rise office buildings. A 100,000 square feet (9,300 m^{2}) public plaza would be constructed in the center of the block. Further East, 980 apartments are proposed for the site of the Regal Lloyd Center 10 movie theater.

A 174-room Red Lion hotel, built in 1962 as the Cosmopolitan Motor Hotel, was purchased for $12.5 million in 2013 by Grand Ventures Hotel. After a $15 million renovation from 2013–2015, it reopened as the upscale Hotel Eastlund.
