= NE 7th Ave station =

Light rail station in Portland, Oregon, U.S.

NE 7th Ave
- The station platform, 2026

General information
- Location: NE Holladay St & NE 7th Ave; Portland, Oregon; USA
- Coordinates: 45°31′48″N 122°39′29″W
- Owner: TriMet
- Platforms: Side platforms
- Tracks: 2
- Connections: Portland Streetcar: A Loop; TriMet: 6

Construction
- Parking: none
- Cycle facilities: bike lockers
- Accessible: Accessible to people with mobility devices

History
- Opened: September 5, 1986

Services
Preceding station	TriMet	Following station
Convention Center toward Hatfield Government Center	Blue Line	Lloyd Center/NE 11th Ave toward Cleveland Ave
Convention Center toward Hillsboro Airport/Fairgrounds	Red Line	Lloyd Center/NE 11th Ave toward Portland Airport
Former services
Preceding station	TriMet	Following station
Convention Center toward PSU South/SW 5th & Jackson	Green Line 2009–2026	Lloyd Center/NE 11th Ave toward Clackamas Town Center Transit Center
Convention Center toward Galleria/SW 10th Ave	Portland Vintage Trolley 1991–2009	Northeast 11th Avenue Terminus
Location

Northeast 7th Avenue is a light rail station on the Blue and Red Lines in Portland, Oregon. It is the 9th stop eastbound on the Eastside MAX.

The station is located at the area of Northeast 7th Avenue and Holladay Street. The station primarily serves a large complex of Oregon government buildings and office buildings. From 2001 to 2012, this station was located within Fareless Square (renamed the Free Rail Zone in 2010), but the free-ride zone was discontinued in September 2012. Bus line 70-12th/NE 33rd Avenue stops nearby on 9th Avenue.

The station also provides a connection with Portland Streetcar's Loop Service (called the Central Loop until 2015), with southbound streetcars (the A Loop) crossing the MAX tracks just west of the platform and serving a stop one block to the north (stop ID 13611).

Due to major building construction adjacent, the station was temporarily closed for more than one year in 2014–2015. As of mid-March 2014, the closure was scheduled to begin on March 31, 2014, and last about one year. As of April 23, 2015, the station was scheduled to reopen on May 3, 2015.

On November 15, 2023, the station was the location of an unusual crash and double derailment between a MAX Red Line train and a streetcar, injuring two.

As of August 2026, the Green Line was cut back to Gateway Transit Center and no longer serves this station.
