= Convention Center station (TriMet) =

Light rail station in Portland, Oregon, US

Convention Center
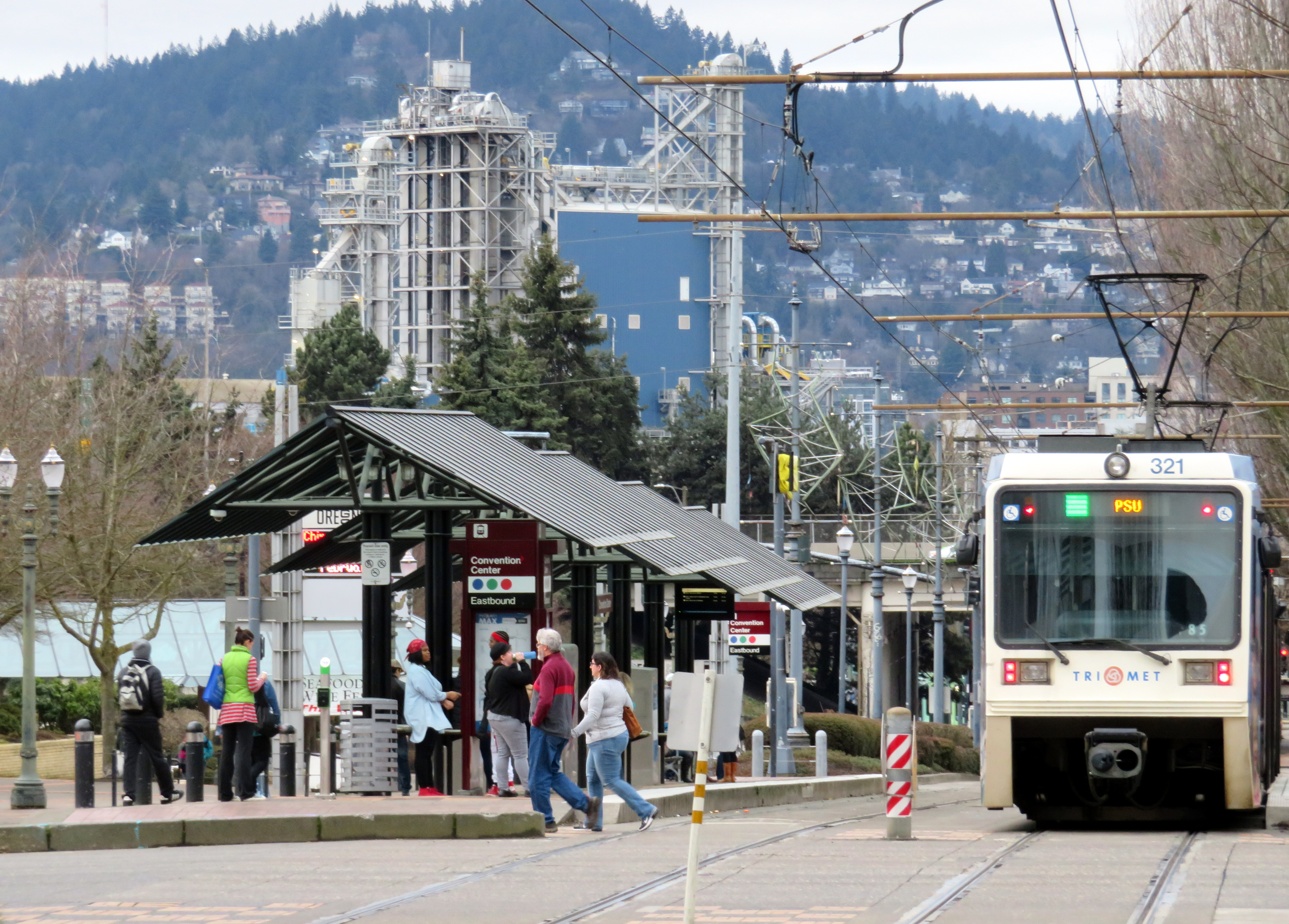
- Convention Center station, looking southwest

General information
- Location: NE Holladay Street and Martin Luther King Jr. Blvd., Portland, Oregon; USA
- Coordinates: 45°31′48″N 122°39′44″W
- Owner: TriMet
- Platforms: Side platforms
- Tracks: 2
- Connections: Portland Streetcar: A and B Loop; TriMet: 6

Construction
- Accessible: yes

History
- Opened: September 20, 1990

Services
Preceding station	TriMet	Following station
Rose Quarter Transit Center toward Hatfield Government Center	Blue Line	NE 7th Ave toward Cleveland Ave
Rose Quarter Transit Center toward Hillsboro Airport/Fairgrounds	Red Line	NE 7th Ave toward Portland Airport
Former services
Preceding station	TriMet	Following station
Rose Quarter Transit Center toward PSU South/SW 5th & Jackson	Green Line 2009–2026	NE 7th Ave toward Clackamas Town Center Transit Center
Rose Quarter Transit Center toward Galleria/SW 10th Ave	Portland Vintage Trolley 1991–2009	NE 7th Ave toward Northeast 11th Avenue
Location

Convention Center station is a light rail station on the MAX Blue and Red Lines in Portland, Oregon. It is the 8th stop eastbound on the current Eastside MAX, having not been built when the original line opened, in 1986. It was built to serve the Oregon Convention Center, which did not exist when the MAX line opened, and was completed and opened in the same month as the Convention Center, September 1990.

The station is located on Northeast Holladay Street at its intersection with Northeast Martin Luther King Jr. Boulevard. Although the station primarily serves the Oregon Convention Center, and the main entry to that building faces the light rail station, there are also a number of hotels immediately east and also north of the station.

From 2001 to 2012, this station was located within Fareless Square (renamed the Free Rail Zone in 2010), but the free-ride zone was discontinued in September 2012.

As of August 2026, the Green Line was cut back to Gateway Transit Center and no longer serves this station.

== Portland Streetcar connection ==
Southbound streetcars on the Portland Streetcar's Loop Service (called the CL Line until 2015), or A Loop cars, to the Central Eastside district and the Oregon Museum of Science and Industry (OMSI), serve a stop located about 1,000 feet south of this station, on Martin Luther King Jr. Blvd., on the Convention Center's east side (stop ID 5912). Northbound/eastbound streetcars on the same line, B Loop cars, to the Pearl District and the West End of downtown, serve a stop about 400–500 feet from this station, on NE Grand Avenue just south of Holladay Street (stop ID number 2175).

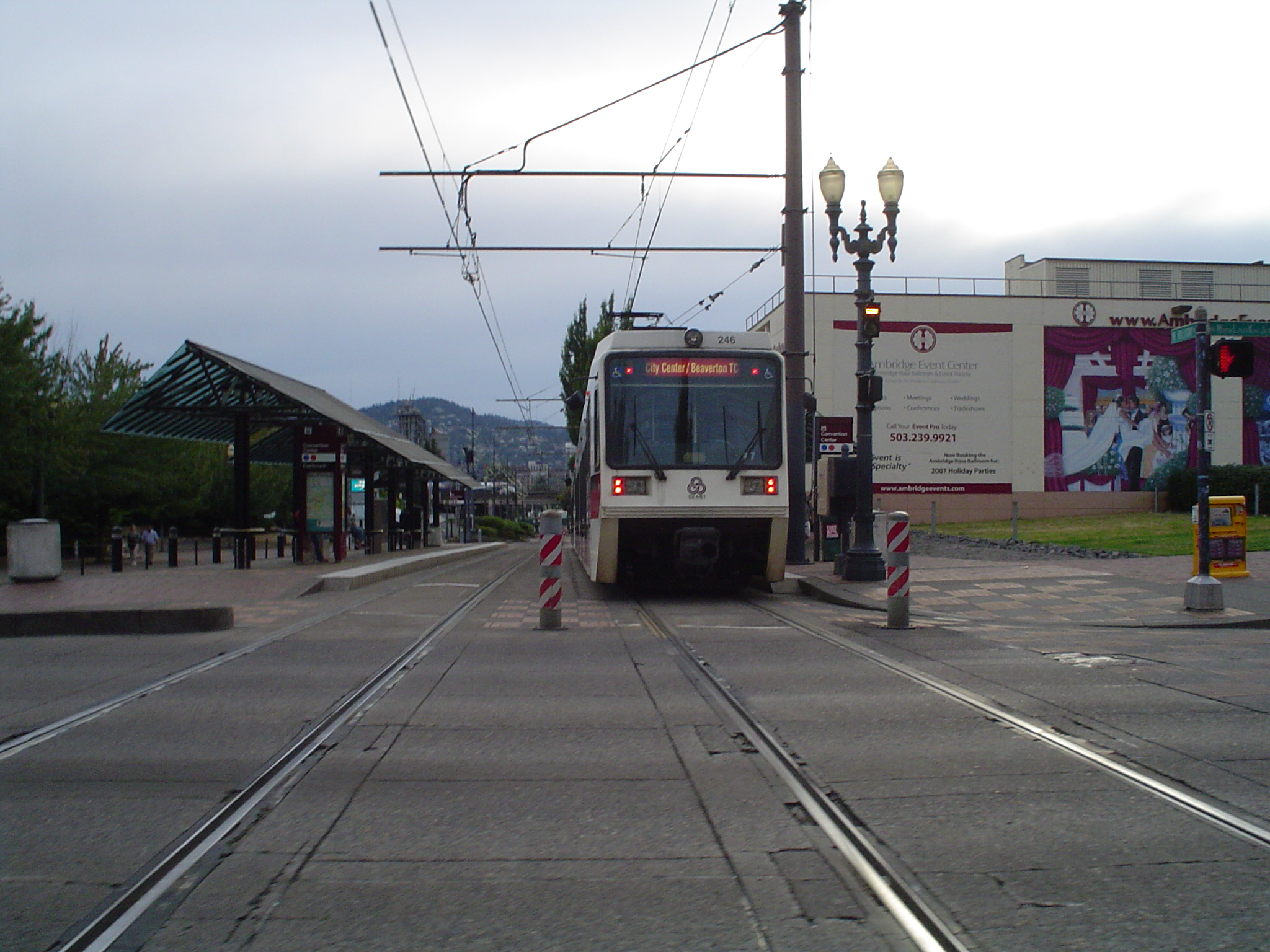
A train arriving at the station

== Bus line connections ==
This station is served by the following bus line:

- 6-Martin Luther King Jr Blvd.
