= Lloyd Center/NE 11th Ave station =

Light rail station in Portland, Oregon, U.S.

Lloyd Center/NE 11th Ave
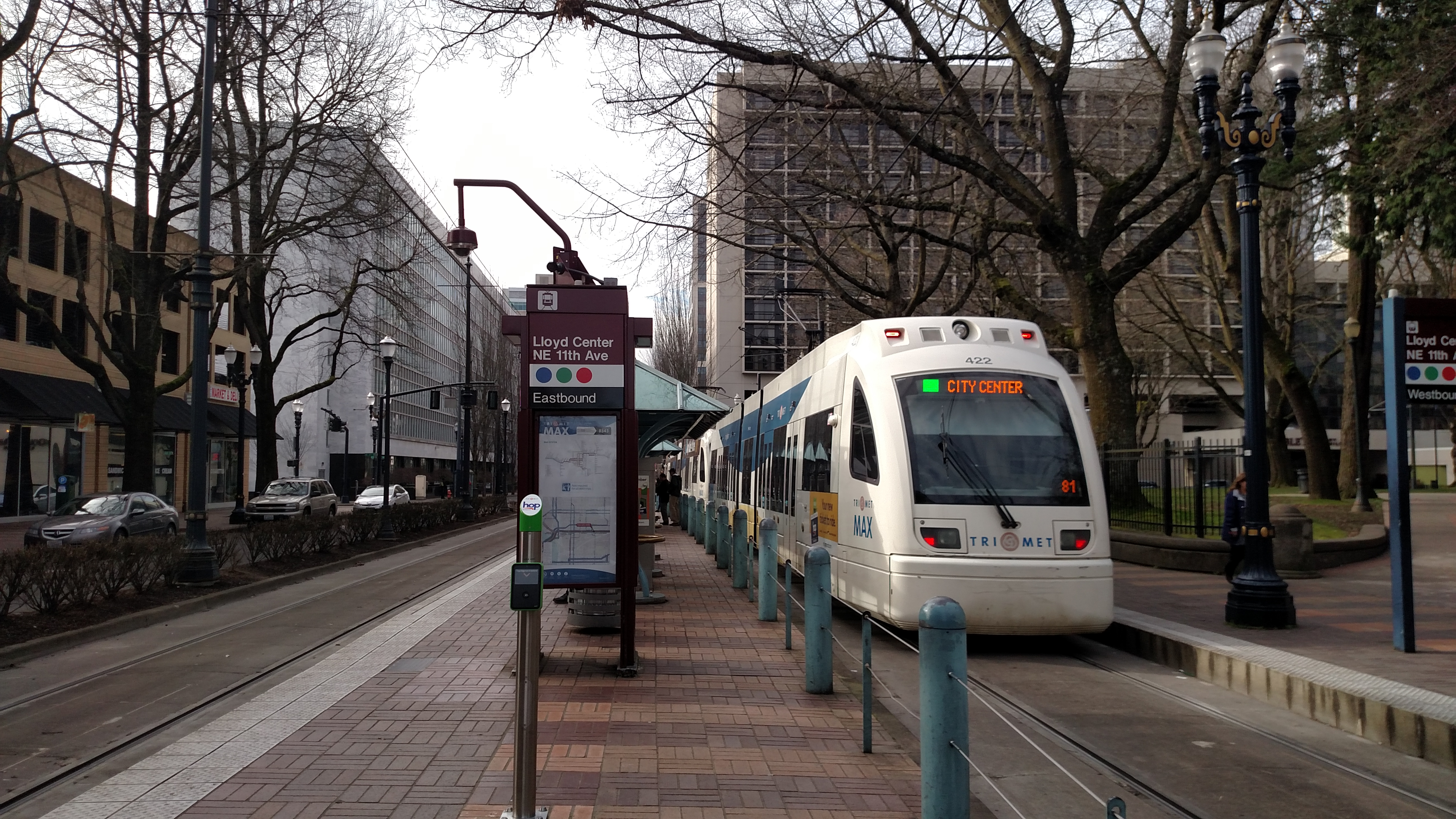
- Lloyd Center MAX station, looking west

General information
- Location: NE Holladay St & NE 11th Ave; Portland, Oregon; USA
- Coordinates: 45.530105°N 122.65405°W
- Owner: TriMet
- Platforms: 1 island and 1 side platform
- Tracks: 2
- Connections: TriMet: 8, 70

Construction
- Cycle facilities: bike lockers
- Accessible: yes

History
- Opened: September 5, 1986

Services
Preceding station	TriMet	Following station
NE 7th Ave toward Hatfield Government Center	Blue Line	Hollywood/NE 42nd Ave toward Cleveland Ave
NE 7th Ave toward Hillsboro Airport/Fairgrounds	Red Line	Hollywood/NE 42nd Ave toward Portland Airport
Former services
Preceding station	TriMet	Following station
Lloyd Center/NE 11th Ave
Convention Center toward PSU South/SW 5th & Jackson	Green Line 2009–2026	Hollywood/NE 42nd Ave toward Clackamas Town Center Transit Center
NE 11th Ave
NE 7th Ave toward Galleria/SW 10th Ave	Portland Vintage Trolley 1991–2009	Terminus
Location

Lloyd Center/Northeast 11th Avenue is a light rail station on the MAX Blue and Red Lines in Portland, Oregon. It is the 10th stop eastbound on the Eastside MAX. The station is located on the 1200 block of Northeast Holladay Street in the Lloyd District.

The station served the Lloyd Center shopping mall to the north, which closed permanently on August 8, 2026; between the station and the mall is Holladay Park. The station also serves Benson Polytechnic High School to the south.

From its opening in 1986 until 2012, the station was located in TriMet fare zone 1, and starting in 2001 it was also within Fareless Square (renamed the Free Rail Zone in 2010). However, effective September 1, 2012, TriMet discontinued the free-ride zone and all use of zones in its fare structure.

As of August 2026, the Green Line was cut back to Gateway Transit Center and no longer serves this station.

== Bus line connections ==
As of August 2026, this station is served by the following bus lines:

- 8 - Jackson Park/NE 15th
- 70 - Milwaukie Ave/12th

== 11th Avenue spur ==
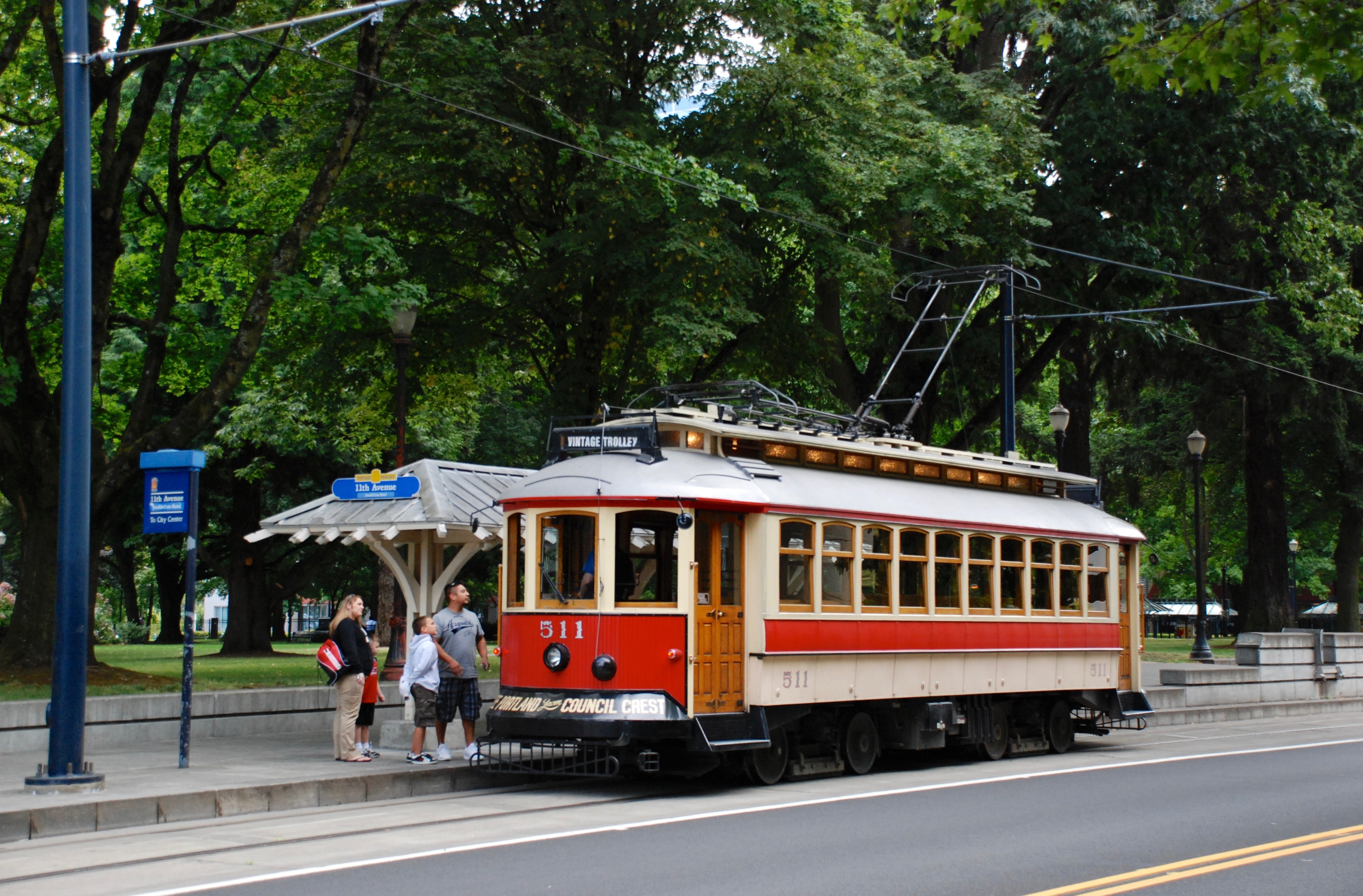
A Vintage Trolley at the trolley-only station on the NE 11th Avenue spur track in 2009

To the northwest of the station is a short spur track on Northeast 11th Avenue now used only for temporary storage of MAX trains for use after major Rose Quarter events. The spur was built for use by the Portland Vintage Trolley, and from 1991 to 2009 that was its primary use. At the end of the spur, at the southern edge of Multnomah Street, is a small platform for use by Vintage Trolley (VT) cars, that service's Northeast 11th Avenue station, and it was equipped with a shelter. However, in September 2009, the Vintage Trolley service moved to a new route along the Portland Transit Mall. With that change the faux-vintage cars only went to and from the NE 11th Avenue stop at the beginning and end of each VT operating day (of which there were about 25 in 2010, but reduced to only seven in 2011) and otherwise operated solely within downtown Portland. The Vintage Trolley service was discontinued entirely in July 2014.
