= Rose Quarter Transit Center =

Transit center in Portland, Oregon, U.S.

Coordinates: 45.530194°N 122.665278°W

Rose Quarter TC Interstate/Rose Quarter
- A Red Line train stopped at the eastbound MAX platform with the Moda Center in the background, 2026

General information
- Location: 1091 North Williams Avenue
- Owner: TriMet
- Platforms: Rose Quarter TC: 1 island & 2 side platforms; Interstate/Rose Quarter: 2 side platforms
- Tracks: Rose Quarter TC: 3; Interstate/Rose Quarter: 2
- Bus routes: TriMet: 4, 8, 17, 35, 40, 44, 70, 77; C-Tran: 105/105X

Construction
- Cycle facilities: Bike racks and lockers
- Accessible: yes

History
- Opened: Rose Quarter TC MAX stop: September 5, 1986; Interstate/Rose Quarter MAX stop: May 1, 2004

Services
Preceding station	TriMet	Following station
Rose Quarter Transit Center
Old Town/Chinatown toward Hatfield Government Center	Blue Line	Convention Center toward Cleveland Ave
Old Town/Chinatown toward Hillsboro Airport/Fairgrounds	Red Line	Convention Center toward Portland Airport
Interstate/Rose Quarter
Union Station/NW 6th & Hoyt One-way operation	Yellow Line	Albina/Mississippi toward Expo Center
Union Station/NW 5th & Glisan Terminus	Yellow Line	Albina/Mississippi toward Expo Center
Former services
Preceding station	TriMet	Following station
Rose Quarter Transit Center
Union Station/NW 6th & Hoyt One-way operation	Green Line 2009–2026	Convention Center toward Clackamas Town Center Transit Center
Union Station/NW 5th & Glisan toward PSU South/SW 5th & Jackson	Green Line 2009–2026	Convention Center toward Clackamas Town Center Transit Center
Old Town/Chinatown toward Galleria/SW 10th Ave	Portland Vintage Trolley 1991–2009	Convention Center toward Northeast 11th Avenue
Interstate/Rose Quarter
Old Town/Chinatown toward Galleria/SW 10th Ave	Yellow Line 2004–2009	Albina/Mississippi toward Expo Center
Location

Rose Quarter Transit Center is a transit complex located in the Rose Quarter area in Portland, Oregon; it is served by both the TriMet and C-Tran transit agencies. It contains a bus station served by 12 bus lines and two MAX light rail stops served by four lines. It is served by the Blue and Red MAX lines at the Rose Quarter Transit Center stop, as well as the Yellow Line at the Interstate/Rose Quarter stop located along North Interstate Avenue. Originally called Coliseum Transit Center, it was renamed Rose Quarter Transit Center in 1994. It is TriMet's busiest transit center, with 9,454 average weekday boardings and alightings for all modes in fall 2025.

Rose Quarter Transit Center is located at 1091 North Williams Avenue; the complex serves the Rose Quarter area, as well as the Moda Center and the Veterans Memorial Coliseum located to the northwest. Rose Quarter Transit Center has three platforms: two side platforms plus an additional island platform and track used as train storage and during special events. The former Portland Vintage Trolley car barn is located on the north side of the platforms at Rose Quarter Transit Center and connects to the tracks just to the east of the station. It has since been converted into a maintenance facility for TriMet workers.

From 2001 to 2012, the transit center was located within Fareless Square (renamed the Free Rail Zone in 2010), but the free-ride zone was discontinued in September 2012.

== Bus line connections ==
This station is served by the following bus lines:

- 4 - Fessenden/Woodstock
- 8 - Jackson Park/NE 15th
- 17 - Holgate/NE 33rd
- 35 - Macadam/Greeley
- 40 - Tacoma/Swan Island
- 44 - Capitol Hwy/N Rosa Parks
- 70 - Milwaukie Ave/12th
- 77 - Broadway/Halsey

== History ==
=== MAX opening and expansion (1986-present) ===
MAX service at Rose Quarter Transit Center began in September 1986 with the opening of the first MAX service between Pioneer Courthouse Square in Downtown Portland to the Cleveland Avenue station in Gresham; this service would be renamed to the MAX Blue Line after the opening of the Westside and Airport MAX extensions in 1998 and 2001, respectively. With the opening of the aforementioned Airport MAX extension, MAX Red Line service at the station began in September 2001. The Interstate MAX extension introduced Yellow line service at a new MAX stop within the Rose Quarter Transit Center complex titled Interstate/Rose Quarter in May 2004. MAX Green Line service began in 2009 with the opening of the I-205 MAX extension in September 2009. As of August 2026, the Green Line was cut back to Gateway Transit Center and no longer serves this station.

Rose Quarter TC is TriMet's busiest transit center as of fall 2025, with 9,454 average weekday boardings and alightings for all modes.

== Gallery ==
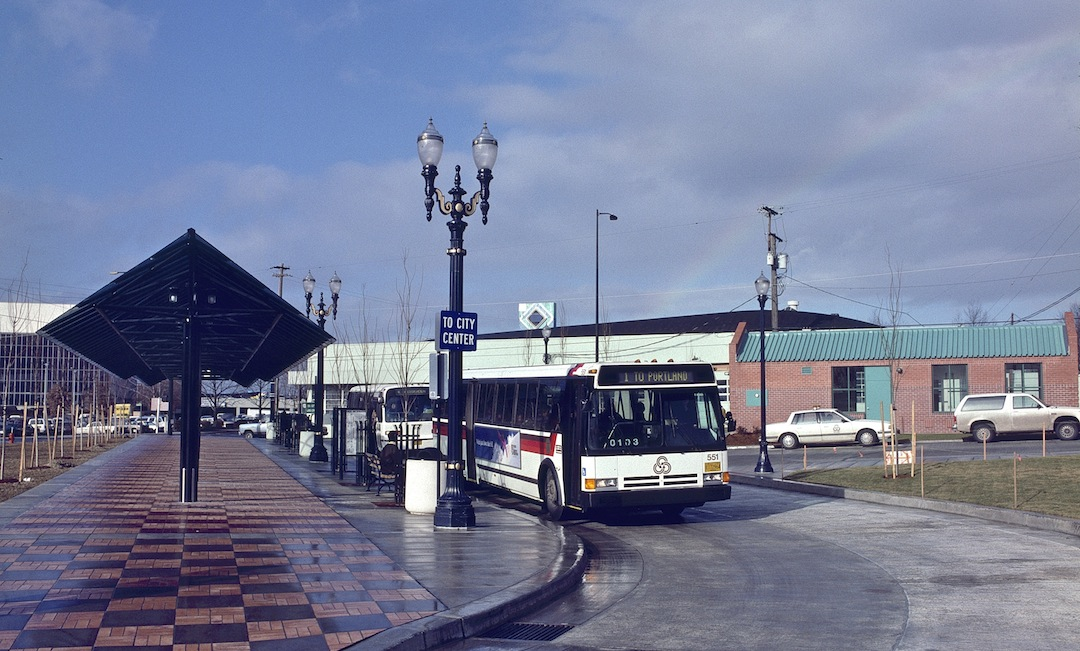
Coliseum TC in 1991, before the creation of the Rose Quarter

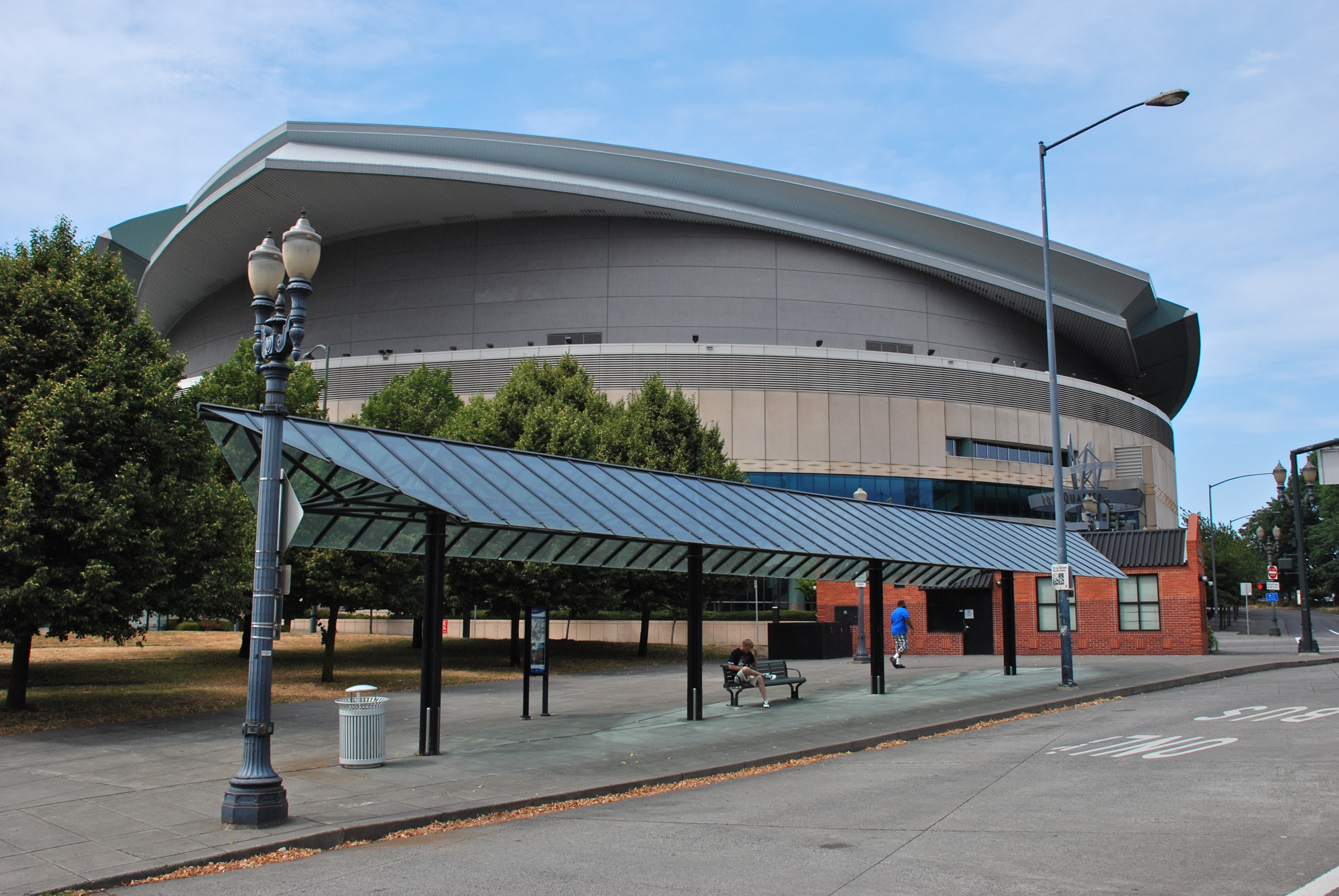
Bus-stop shelter and Moda Center

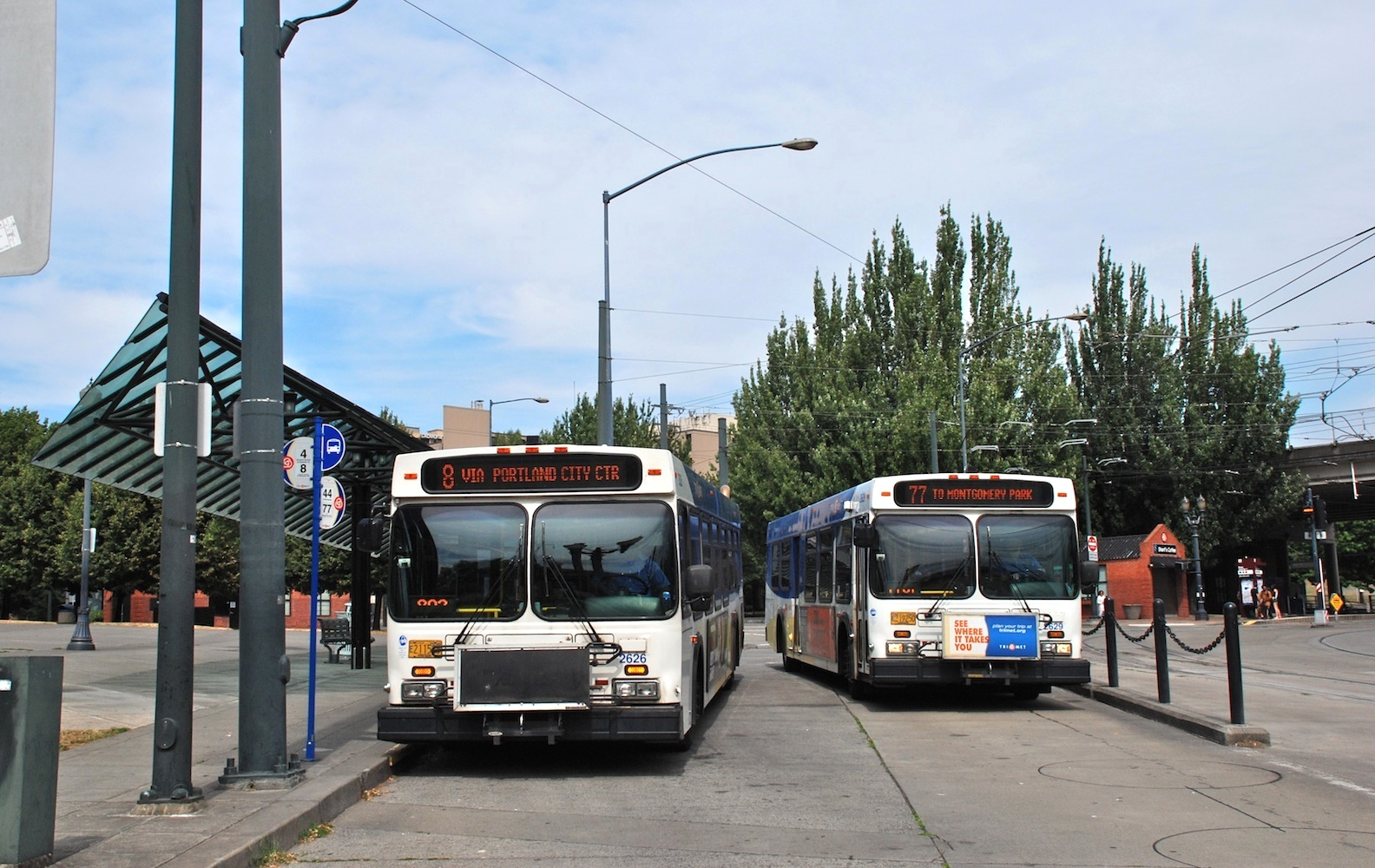
Buses at the transit center in 2013. The MAX station is in the background, at right.

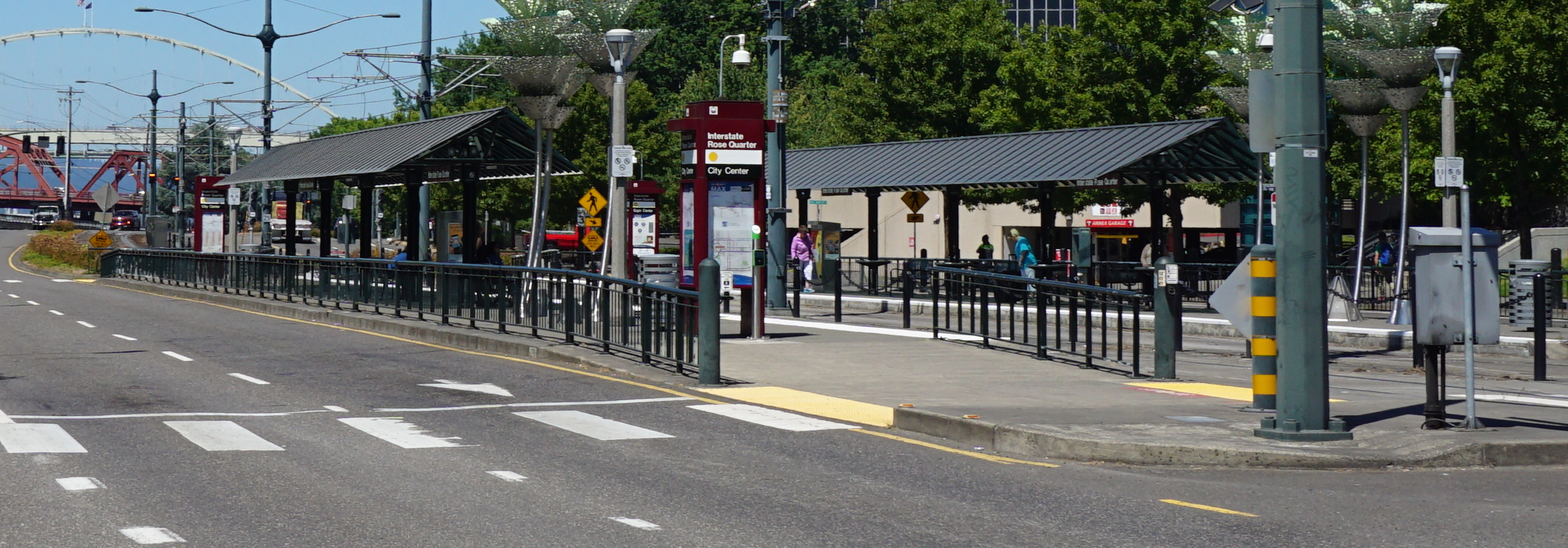
Interstate/Rose Quarter station

== See also ==
- List of TriMet transit centers
