= 2016 IAAF World Indoor Championships – Masters Women's 800 metres =

Masters Women's 800 metres at the 2016 IAAF World Indoor Championships
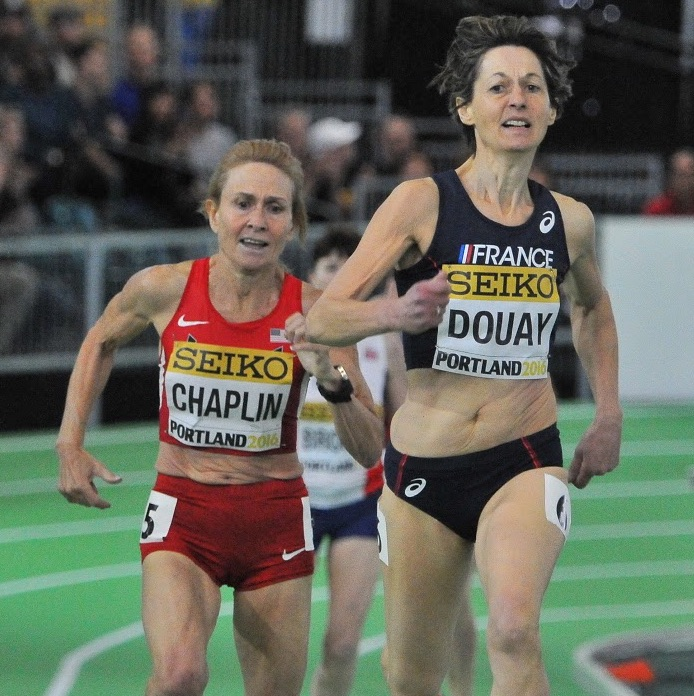
- Lesley Chaplin and Helene Marie Douay at the finish photo courtesy Ken Stone / masterstrack.com
- Venue: Oregon Convention Center
- Dates: March 19 (final)
- Competitors: 6 from 6 nations
- Winning time: 2:37.30

Medalists
gold medal	Helene Marie Douay	France
silver medal	Lesley Chaplin	United States
bronze medal	Karen Brooks	Great Britain

The masters women's 800 metres was an exhibition event for women in the W55 division at the 2016 IAAF World Indoor Championships held on 19 March 2016.

Helene Marie Douay led from the gun but it wasn't as simple as that. Lesley Chaplin, Julie Hayden and Karen Brooks were all in close order behind her. On the final lap, Douay put a little bit of a gap on Hayden who was on her shoulder as the lap began, then Chaplin started sprinting from third place. making up almost all of the gap by the finish.

== Results ==
Rank	Name	Nationality	Time	Notes
1	Helene Marie Douay	France	2:37.30	
2	Lesley Chaplin	United States	2:37.57	
3	Karen Brooks	Great Britain	2:40.14	
4	Julie Hayden	United States	2:40.70	
5	Deborah Drennan	Australia	2:42.69	
6	Cheryl Bellaire	United States	2:45.05	
