= Oregon Square =

Building complex in Portland, Oregon, U.S.

Coordinates: 45.52933°N 122.65760°W

Oregon Square is a collection of low-rise office buildings in Portland, Oregon's Lloyd District, in the United States. It hosts a year-round farmer's market. American Assets Trust plans to start construction on a major renovation at Oregon Square in spring or summer of 2016.
