= Portland Vintage Trolley =

Heritage streetcar

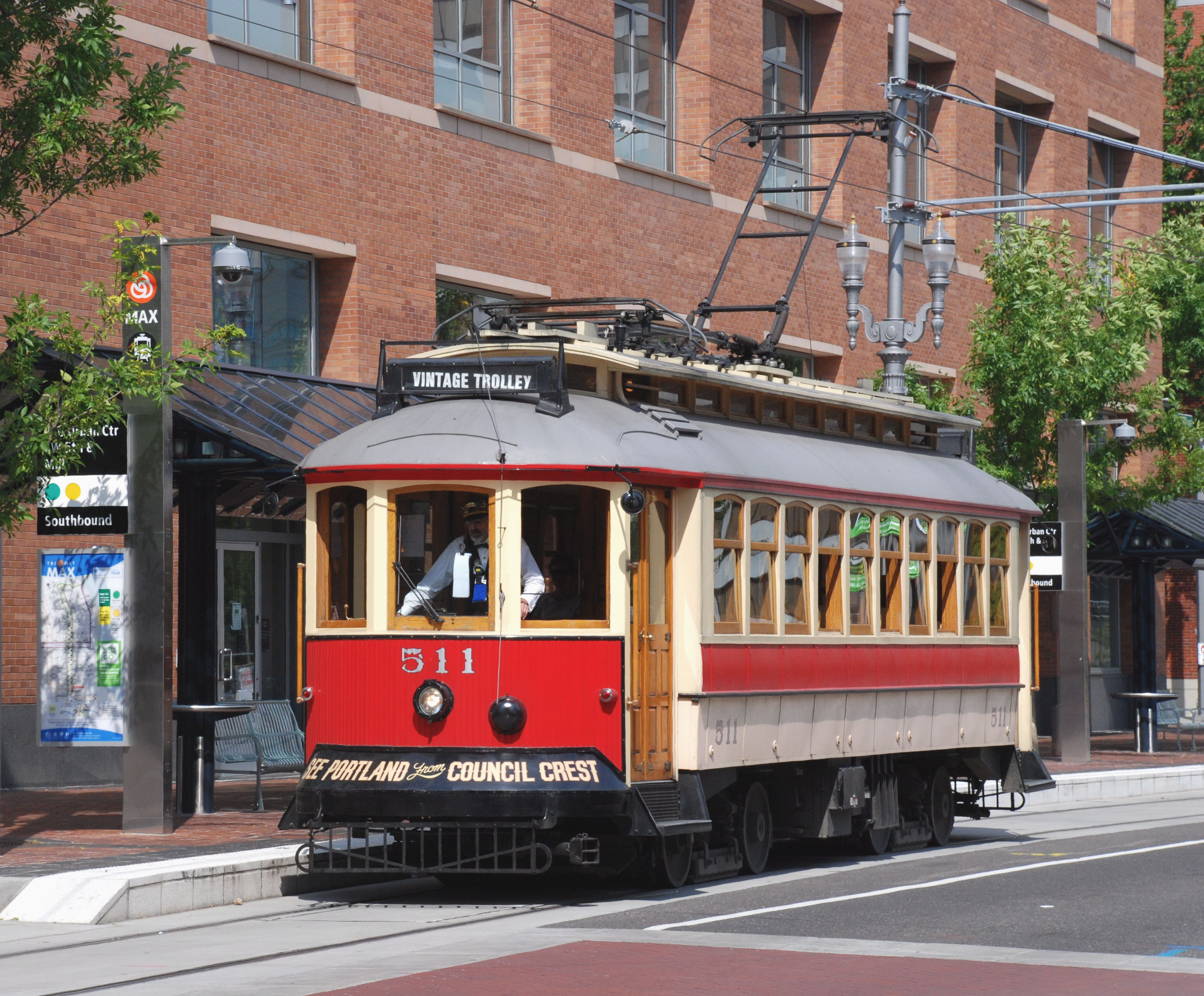
- One of the replica Brill cars at the PSU Urban Center station in September 2009

Overview
- Status: Ceased operation
- Owner: TriMet and Vintage Trolley, Inc.
- Locale: Portland, Oregon, U.S.

Service
- Type: Heritage streetcar
- System: MAX Light Rail of TriMet (1991–2014); also Portland Streetcar (2001–2005)
- Operator(s): TriMet
- Rolling stock: 4 Gomaco-built 1903 Brill replicas

History
- Opened: November 29, 1991
- Closed: July 6, 2014

Technical
- Track gauge: 4 ft 8 1/2 in (1,435 mm) (standard gauge)
- Electrification: Overhead lines, 750 V DC

The Portland Vintage Trolley was a heritage streetcar service in Portland, Oregon, United States, that operated from 1991 to 2014. It operated on a portion of the MAX light rail system, and for a brief time also operated on the Portland Streetcar system, in downtown and nearby areas. Service was provided with replicas of a type of Brill streetcar, nicknamed the "Council Crest" cars, which last served Portland in 1950. The service was managed by Vintage Trolley Inc., a non-profit corporation, and the cars were owned and operated by TriMet, Portland's transit agency. For 18 of its 23 years, the service followed a 2.3-mile (3.7 km) section of what is now the MAX Blue Line, between Lloyd Center and the west end of downtown. In September 2009, the route was changed to a 1.5-mile (2.4 km) section of the MAX system, along the transit mall in downtown Portland, from Union Station to Portland State University (PSU). Vintage Trolley service on the first Portland Streetcar line lasted for a little more than five years, from its opening in 2001 until 2005.

Introduced in 1991, Vintage Trolley service operated on most weekends or at least most Sundays, from March through December, in all past years through 2010, and ran seven days a week from 1994 through 1999. However, starting in 2011 the service was heavily reduced, operating on just seven dates per year, and it remained at that reduced level for its final four seasons. Rides were narrated by a conductor who identified historic points of interest along the way. After May 1994, rides were free, but donations were accepted.

On December 22, 2013, the service operated for what was, at the time, scheduled to be the last time, as a result of a decision by TriMet on December 11 to sell the two remaining Gomaco-built Brill-replica streetcars (511 and 512) to a group planning a streetcar line in St. Louis, Missouri. Earlier in 2013, the other two Gomaco cars were transferred from Portland Vintage Trolley service to the Willamette Shore Trolley (WST) fleet, although their entry into service there was delayed to 2014 (and one of the two cars was not moved to the WST line until 2014). However, after the transfer of streetcars 511 and 512 to St. Louis was delayed from spring to September 2014, TriMet scheduled two additional dates of Vintage Trolley service: May 25 and July 6, 2014, and the latter was the final day of service.

== History ==
=== Early history ===
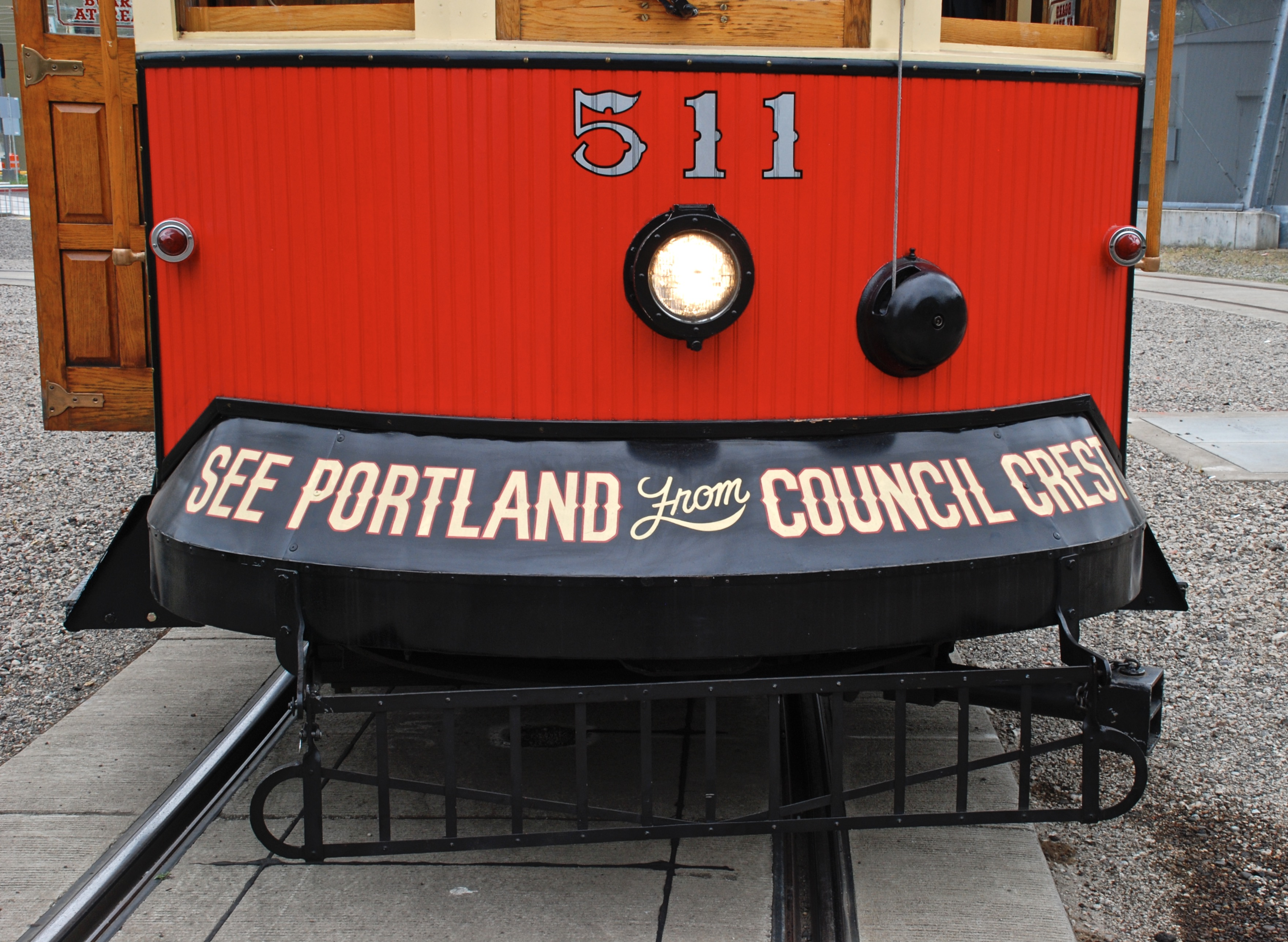
The cars were replicas of trolley cars that served Portland's Council Crest line from 1904 to 1950, and carried this marketing slogan that had once been worn by the original cars.

Portland Vintage Trolley service began operation on November 29, 1991, on a 2.3-mile (3.7 km) section of TriMet's first MAX line, between Lloyd Center and Galleria/SW 10th Avenue station in the West End of downtown, including crossing the Willamette River on the Steel Bridge.

The idea of operating vintage streetcars in Downtown Portland had been proposed at least as early as the mid-1970s, as a way to lure back to the city center shoppers who increasingly preferred suburban shopping malls. One of its most enthusiastic and influential proponents was Portland businessman Bill Naito (who later became the first president of Vintage Trolley, Inc.).

However, the idea only finally began to garner growing support following the 1978 approval to construct a light rail system in Portland, the "Banfield Light Rail" project, renamed Metropolitan Area Express, or MAX, shortly before its 1986 opening. Another impetus for the plans was a concern by the Portland Historical Landmarks Commission that introducing a modern light rail system would have a detrimental impact on the character of two downtown historic districts though which the line would pass, the Skidmore/Old Town and Yamhill Historic Districts. Operating vintage streetcars during off-peak hours was seen as a way of alleviating those impacts.

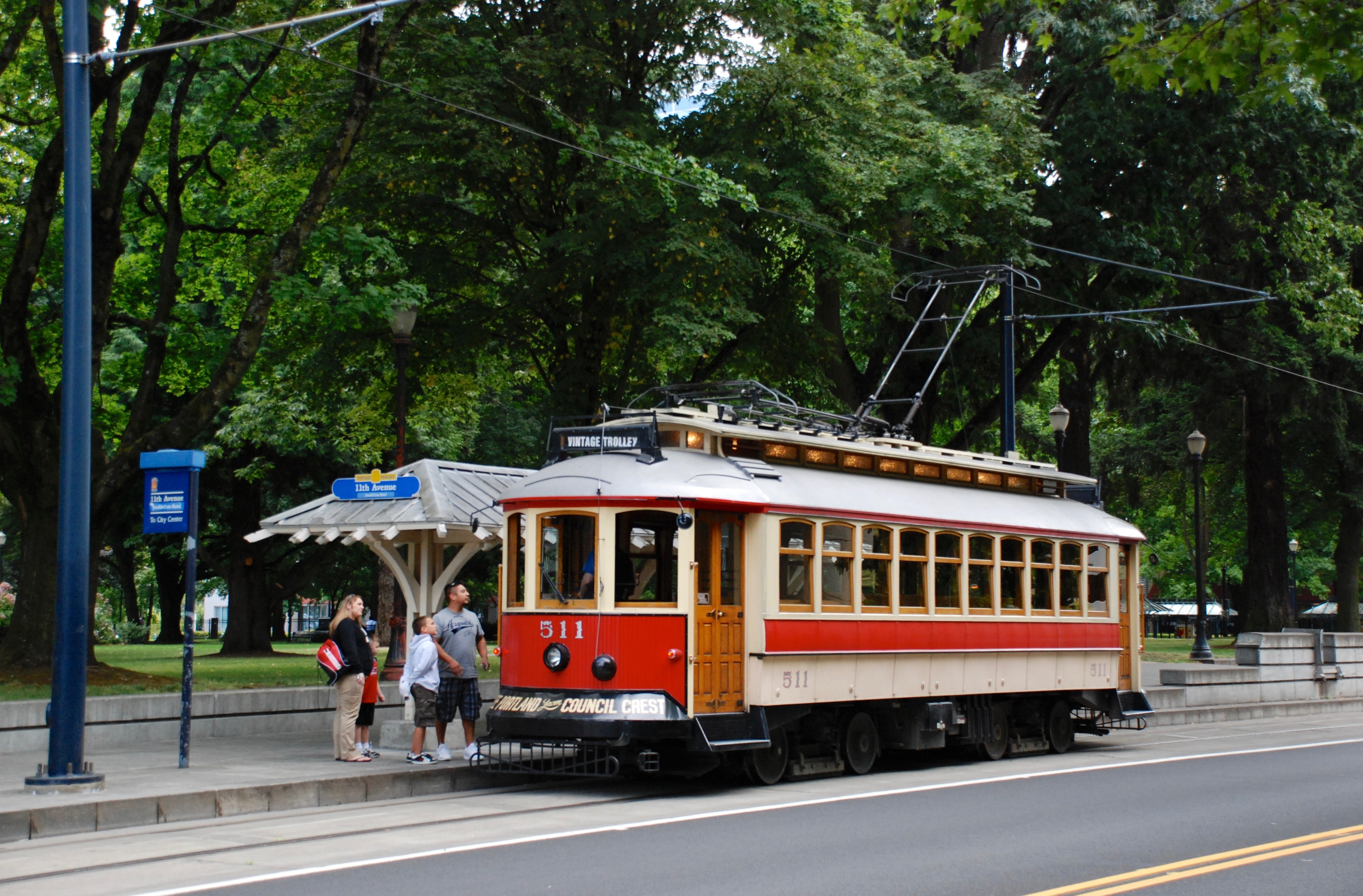
At the service's Lloyd Center station, on NE 11th Avenue at Multnomah Street, on the route followed until 2009

Plans to operate a vintage trolley service on a portion of the MAX line were approved by TriMet in 1987. Some of the costs would be paid by TriMet, some by the federal government, and some by Vintage Trolley, Inc. An order for three replica trolleys was placed (a fourth car was added later), a carbarn was built in the Coliseum (now Rose Quarter) area, and a short length of track and overhead wire were built along Northeast 11th Avenue near Lloyd Center mall. The first two vehicles, numbered 511 and 514, were delivered in August and November 1991, respectively, and service was inaugurated on November 29, 1991, operating daily for the first month. The third car, No. 513, arrived in January. Car 512, the last arrival and the only one of the four to be completed in 1992, was delivered on April 23, 1992, and entered service on June 21 of that year. The service was wheelchair-accessible, but with facilities for disabled riders limited to two stops along the route: a section of high-level boarding platform at the Lloyd Center terminus and, in downtown, a wheelchair lift at the Yamhill District MAX station.

From 1992 through May 1994, service was provided on weekends and holidays only, and suspended for the months of January and February each year (except the first year). However, midday service (10 a.m. to 3 p.m.) on weekdays was usually provided during the month of December to entice more shoppers to downtown and the Lloyd Center during the holiday shopping season. From mid-1994 through 1999, Portland Vintage Trolley service operated seven days a week, March through December. Hours of operation were 10 a.m. to 6 p.m. on weekends and holidays and 10 a.m. to 3 p.m. Mondays to Fridays. In 2000, Vintage Trolley service was reduced to Sundays only, and the hours reduced slightly, to noon to 6. This reduction came about in part because TriMet had opened a second light rail line in September 1998, with a resultant doubling of the frequency of service along the section of the MAX line used by the faux-vintage streetcars. An additional reason was that a trust fund originally set up to pay for the operation had become mostly depleted by this time; TriMet took over most financial responsibility for the service in 2000.

Until the end of May 1994, the fare to ride the Vintage Trolley was $1.00, valid for a round trip. However, fares were eliminated effective June 1994; all rides were then free, and continued to be free for the remainder of Vintage Trolley's existence (but donations were accepted). This was the case even though the route extended outside what were then the boundaries of TriMet's Fareless Square free-ride area. (Fareless Square was expanded in 2001 and then encompassed the entire Vintage Trolley route. It was renamed the "Free Rail Zone" in 2010, but was discontinued in 2012.)

=== Operation on the Portland Streetcar line ===
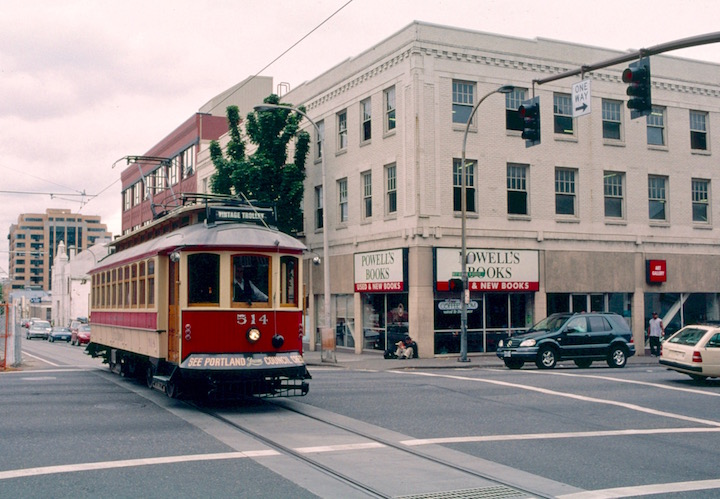
A Vintage Trolley passing Powell's Books, on the Portland Streetcar line, in 2001

From mid-2001 through 2005, Portland Vintage Trolley also served a second route, operating on the Portland Streetcar line from Northwest Portland to Portland State University (PSU) on Saturdays and Sundays, year-round. Two of the four streetcars (Nos. 513 and 514) were transferred from TriMet to the City of Portland in 2001 for use on the new Portland Streetcar line, while the other two cars remained with TriMet for continued use on the original Vintage Trolley route.

Car 514 was moved (towed) to the new line from TriMet's trolley carbarn next to Rose Quarter MAX station on January 7, 2001. It was used for the first test trips on the line's first completed section (in Northwest Portland) later that month, because the first modern Škoda car had not yet been delivered. It was then decided that the two replica-vintage streetcars should receive a few modifications before entering service, primarily the addition of exterior mirrors and turn signals, which had been omitted when they were built in 1991 because the 1903 cars on which they were based had lacked them. These features had been viewed as unnecessary when these cars were operating only on the MAX line, because they were using separate lanes not shared with other traffic, but on the new streetcar line they would be mixing with general traffic. These modifications were made to both cars before they entered service, but car 513 was not moved to the new line until September 2001.

The Portland Streetcar line opened on July 20, 2001, and Vintage Trolley service on it began on July 28. At that time, the line ran from Good Samaritan Hospital, on Northwest 23rd Avenue, to PSU, in downtown Portland, terminating on Southwest Montgomery Street at Southwest 5th Avenue (with the end of the track being on Montgomery at 4th Avenue). On this route, one Vintage Trolley car (of two available) was used at any given time, providing hourly service and replacing a regularly scheduled modern Škoda streetcar. Originally, it was predicted that the two Vintage Trolleys would be needed as spares on the Portland Streetcar line, in case more than one modern car were unavailable for the scheduled service, but the modern cars proved to be sufficiently reliable that the use of vintage trolley cars as spares was never needed.

The Portland Streetcar line was extended at its south end from PSU to RiverPlace in March 2005. Vintage Trolley service on the streetcar line was temporarily suspended at that time, for repair work on the cars, but it resumed in May 2005. However, the Vintage Trolley service did not cover the new section to RiverPlace, continuing to end at PSU (5th and Montgomery).

Vintage Trolley service on Portland Streetcar was temporarily suspended around the end of November 2005, in part because of maintenance problems with the two cars, and in part because the opening of the streetcar line's extension from PSU to RiverPlace in March of that year had caused operations difficulties with the Vintage Trolley cars. This suspension eventually became permanent, and after November 2005 Portland Vintage Trolley operated only on its original route, between Downtown Portland and Lloyd Center, until that route was also discontinued (modified), in mid-2009.

=== 2009 route change ===
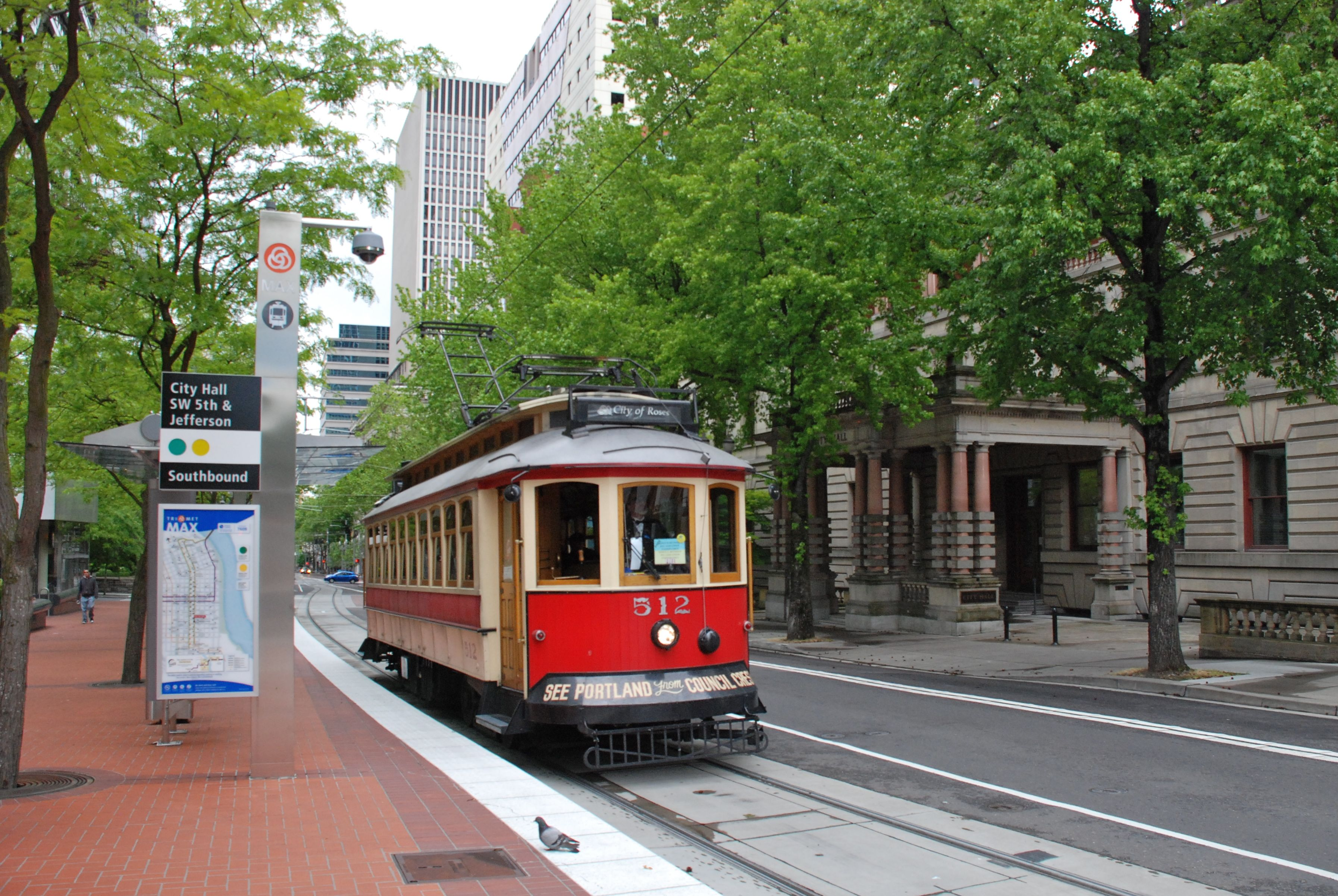
The trolleys passed City Hall from 2009 to 2014.

Until mid-2009, the Portland Vintage Trolley continued to serve the route it had followed since opening 18 years earlier, from the Lloyd District to Galleria/SW 10th Avenue station in downtown Portland, running on Sundays from 12 p.m. to 6 p.m., half-hourly, using two cars, but the final day of service along that route was August 23, 2009. In September 2009, the service was changed to a completely different route, but which is also a section of the MAX system. Commencing on September 13, 2009, Vintage Trolley service operated along the recently rebuilt Portland Transit Mall, on 5th and 6th Avenues in downtown, between Union Station and Portland State University. The service now used only one car and ran from 10:30 a.m. until 5:30 p.m. on its days of operation, which initially continued to include most Sundays from March through December. Passengers were permitted to board or alight at any of the MAX stations along the 1.5-mile (2.4 km) route. A round trip took approximately 30 minutes, and the headway varied between 30 minutes and 45 minutes. On this new route, the service was not wheelchair-accessible.

=== 2011 reduction ===
Effective in 2011, the service was heavily reduced, as a result of budgetary constraints caused by the recession's impact on TriMet's finances, from about 30–35 dates per year in recent years to just seven dates. Although the 2011 schedule included Vintage Trolley service on every Sunday during the peak holiday shopping season, in the last weeks of the year, otherwise the only scheduled operating dates of the entire year were the three Sundays nearest to Memorial Day, Independence Day and Labor Day — specifically May 29, July 3 and September 4, 2011. The route, frequency and hours of operation (on days of operation) remained unchanged. The schedule of operating dates followed the same pattern in subsequent years, and the scheduled dates of operation in 2013 were May 26, July 7, September 1, and four consecutive Sundays from December 1 through December 22. Even after TriMet discontinued Fareless Square (latterly known as the Free Rail Zone), in downtown, rides on Vintage Trolley remained free, but donations were welcomed.

=== Discontinuation ===
In early 2013, it was announced that two of the four replica "Council Crest" streetcars, Nos. 513 and 514, would be transferred to the Willamette Shore Trolley line, to replace a historic streetcar that had been serving that line since 1996 but had broken down in 2010 and not been repaired. Car 514 was moved to the Willamette Shore Trolley line in March 2013, and car 513 was moved on September 8, 2014. Those two cars had not run in service since the end of Vintage Trolley operation on the city-owned Portland Streetcar line, in 2005. All Vintage Trolley service on the TriMet-owned MAX system since 2001 had used cars 511 and 512.

On December 6, 2013, TriMet announced that it had tentatively decided to sell the two remaining cars (511 and 512) to a group in St. Louis, Missouri, which was planning to build a heritage streetcar line there, the Delmar Loop Trolley. The TriMet board approved the sale on December 11, after which the final two days of Vintage Trolley service were December 15 and December 22, 2013. At that time, TriMet indicated that the two trolleys were expected to be moved to St. Louis in mid-2014, but in April 2014 TriMet posted a more precise date for the planned move, of August 2014, and noted on its newly reinstated Vintage Trolley web page that the service would operate on two dates in 2014, May 25 and July 6, with the latter being the (revised) final day of service. The service ran for the last time on July 6, 2014, as planned, and cars 511 and 512 left Portland for St. Louis on September 9, 2014.

== The cars ==
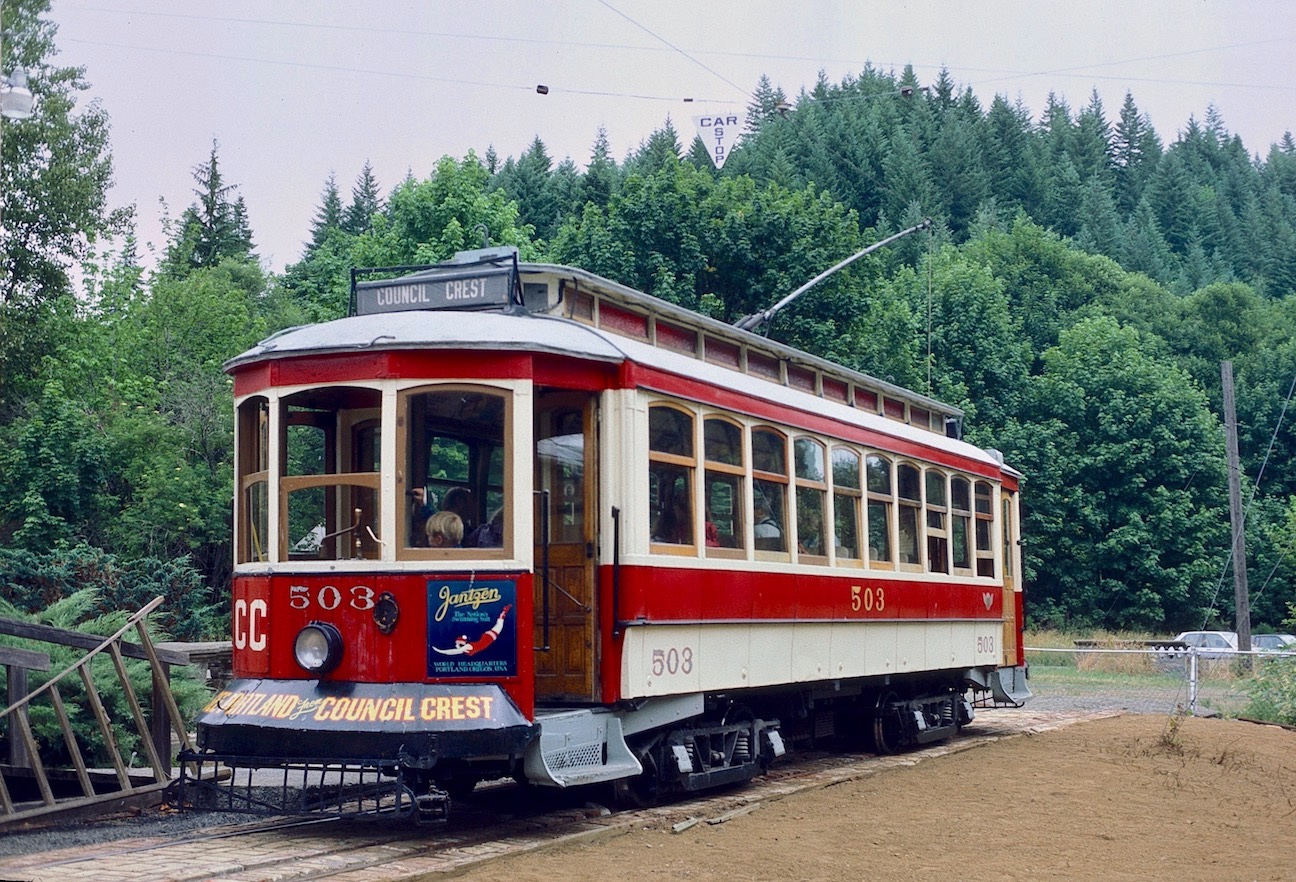
One of the original 1903/04 Portland Brill streetcars on which the design of the "Vintage Trolley" cars was based, shown at the Oregon Electric Railway Museum (its old site) in 1986

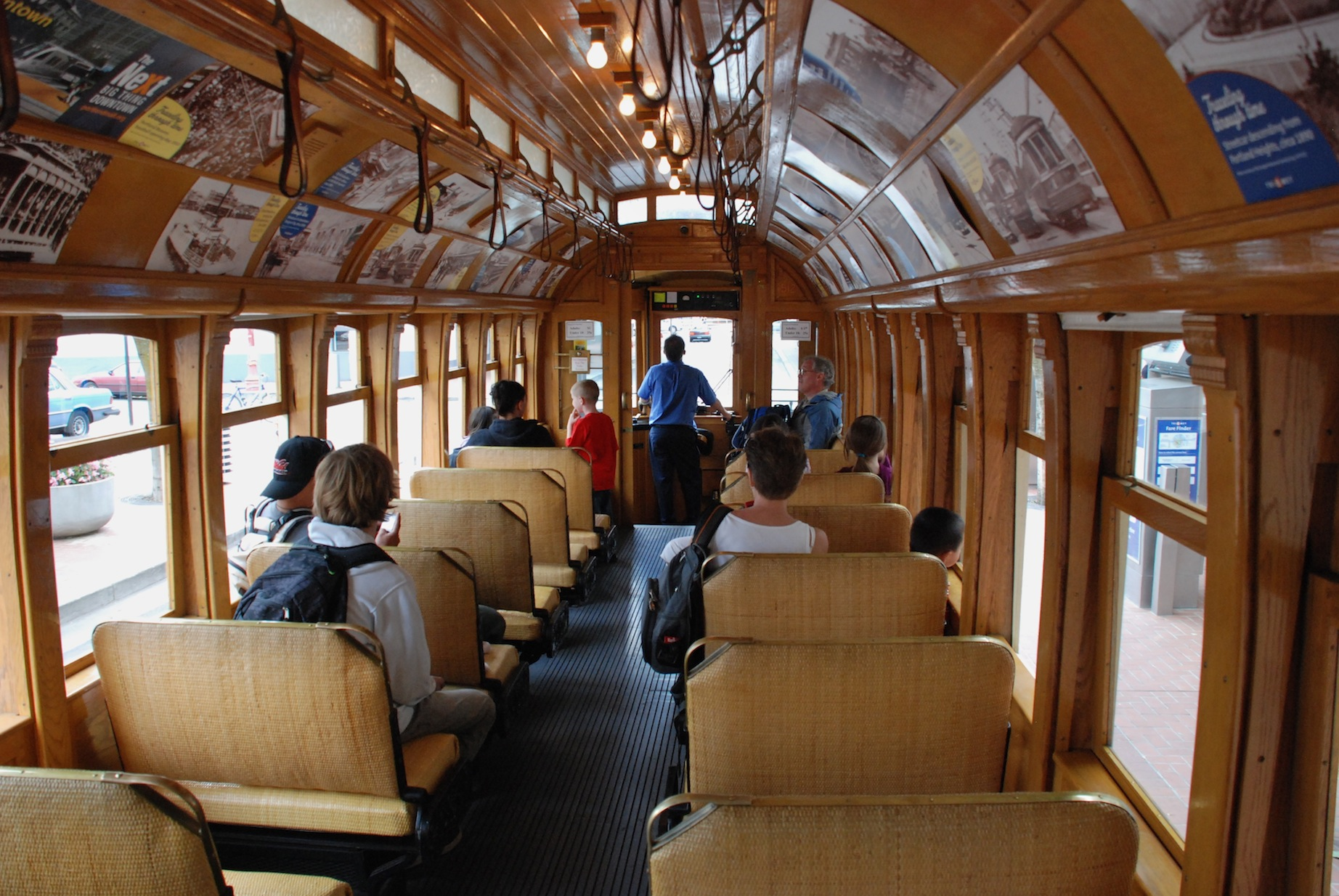
Interior of one of the faux-vintage streetcars

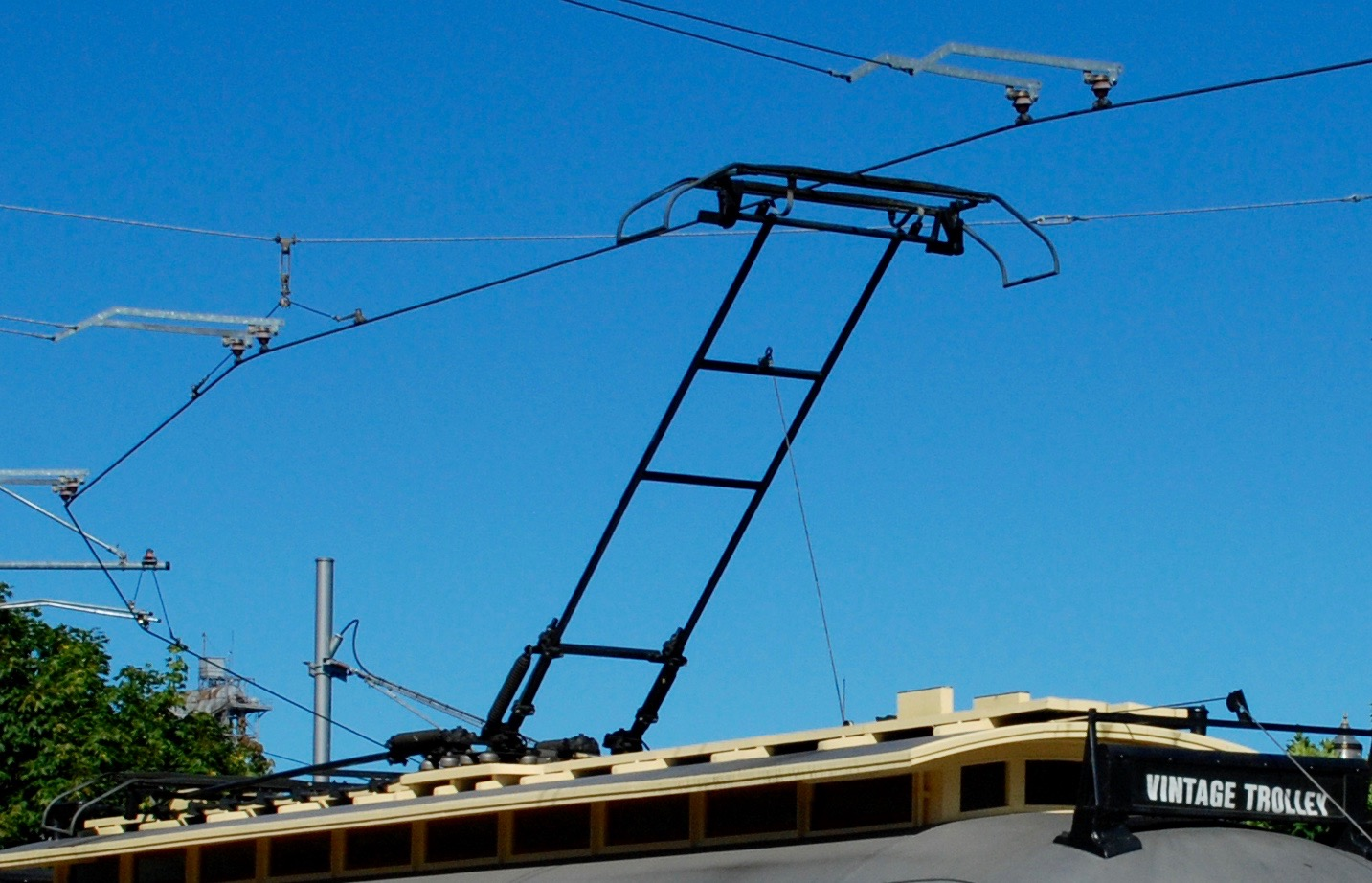
The unusual type of current collector used by the Portland Gomaco cars

The four streetcars/trolleys—these two terms are synonyms in most parts of the United States—were built by the Gomaco Trolley Company, of Ida Grove, Iowa, in 1991 and early 1992. They were designed to replicate, as closely as practicable, a design of streetcar which the J. G. Brill Company supplied to Portland in 1904. Those ten cars were originally numbered 201–210, but were renumbered 501–510 in 1905 and kept those numbers for the remainder of their working lives, which ended in 1950 with the abandonment of Portland's last three city streetcar lines. Although Brill cars 501–510 were not restricted to the Council Crest route, they provided all of the service on that line, and so came to be known by Portlanders as the "Council Crest cars". Two of the original Council Crest streetcars, 503 and 506, are preserved by the Oregon Electric Railway Historical Society at its museum in Brooks, and Gomaco was able to use those cars as patterns for the replicas. The first of the replica trolley cars, No. 511, arrived on August 16, 1991, while the last arrival, No. 512, was delivered on April 23, 1992.

The four cars built in 1991–92 by Gomaco have the same red-and-cream colors as the original 1904 cars and include most of the latter's features, such as padded rattan seats with reversible backrests, carved oak interiors, brass handrails, pull-down window shades and doors which can only be manually opened and closed, by the motorman (operator) or conductor. They were given fleet numbers 511–514 as a continuation of the earlier cars' number series, and in tribute to them. On the front of the replica Vintage Trolleys is painted a slogan that once adorned the ends of their antecedents, See Portland from Council Crest, a reference to the views of the city available from the route's upper terminus, atop Council Crest. The old trolleys had all-wood bodies, whereas the replicas have steel frames, concealed by wood, for better safety and durability. Because they would be sharing the same tracks as MAX, they also were equipped with a more modern style of current collector to draw power from the overhead wires, a cross between a pantograph (the type of collector used by MAX) and a bow collector, instead of the trolley poles which the city's original trolley cars used.

== See also ==
- Heritage streetcar
- Portland Streetcar
- Willamette Shore Trolley
