= Rose Quarter =

Sports and entertainment district in Portland, Oregon

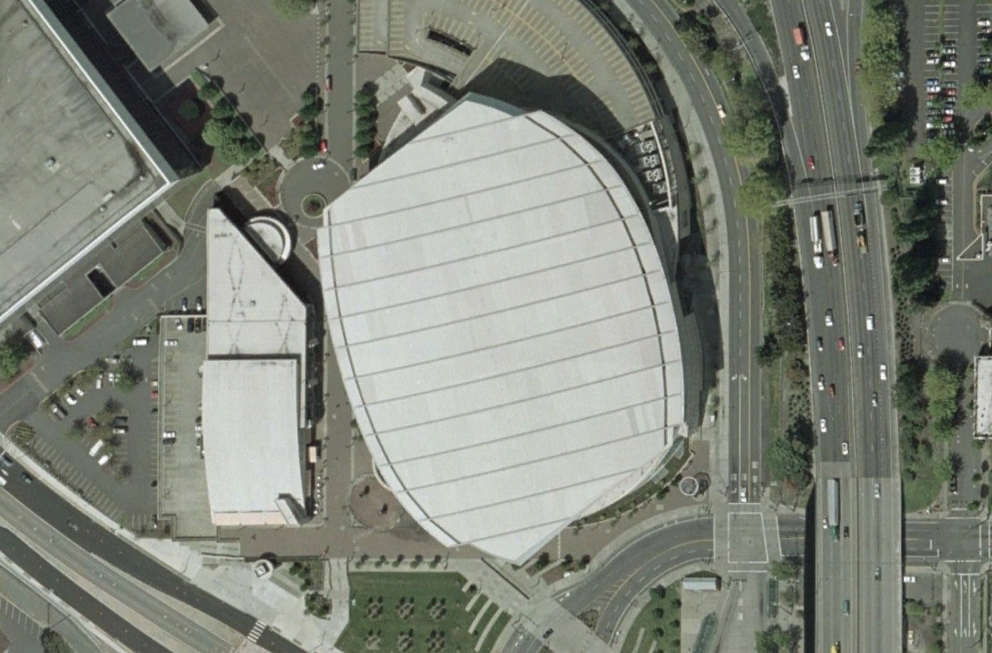
- Interactive map of Rose Quarter
- Location: 1 Center Court; Portland, Oregon 97227
- Coordinates: 45°31′53.44″N 122°40′0.35″W
- Owner: Paul Allen (Vulcan Sports and Entertainment); City of Portland, Oregon
- Operator: AEG Facilities
- Capacity: 19,980 (Moda Center); 12,888 (Coliseum); 6,500 (Theatre of the Clouds)

Construction
- Opened: November 1960 (Memorial Coliseum)
- Expanded: 1993–1995 (construction of Rose Garden Arena, (now called the Moda Center)
- Architects: Skidmore, Owings and Merrill; Ellerbe Becket

The Rose Quarter is a 30-acre (12-hectare) sports and entertainment district located in Portland's Lloyd District on the east bank of the Willamette River, just east of downtown. The Rose Quarter is bounded on the west by NE Interstate Avenue, on the north by NE Broadway and NE Weidler Streets, on the east by Interstate 5, and on the south by NE Holladay Street. The site contains two multipurpose arenas, the Moda Center and the Memorial Coliseum. Nearby landmarks include the Steel and Broadway bridges, the Oregon Convention Center, and the Eastbank Esplanade.

== Facilities ==
The Rose Quarter contains two multipurpose arenas and a large theatre, as well as a box office, four parking garages, a 40,000-square-foot (3,700-square-meter) convention facility, several restaurants and bars, and a large public space, the Rose Quarter Commons.

=== Moda Center ===
The Moda Center is a 785,000-square-foot (7.29-hectare), 19,980-seat multipurpose arena. The arena is divided into two major sections, an upper and lower bowl, separated by a level of luxury boxes. The arena opened in 1995, and is the current home of the Portland Trail Blazers of the National Basketball Association. The Moda Center previously hosted home games for the Portland Winterhawks of the Western Hockey League, and the Portland LumberJax of the National Lacrosse League. It is also used for concerts, circuses, rodeos, ice shows, and conventions.

=== Veterans Memorial Coliseum ===
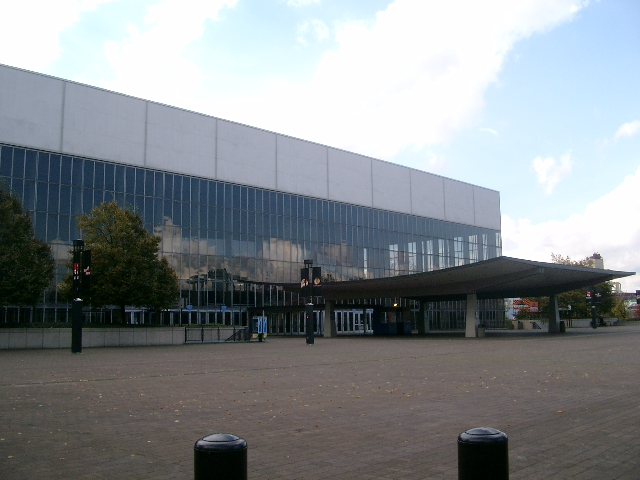
The Veterans Memorial Coliseum

The Veterans Memorial Coliseum is a 12,888-seat multipurpose arena located on the Rose Quarter campus. Built in 1960, it was the original home of the Portland Trail Blazers. Three NBA Finals have been played within its walls, and twice the Larry O'Brien Trophy has been secured on its hardwood, once by the Trail Blazers in 1977, and once by the opposing Detroit Pistons in 1990. It remained the Blazers home court until the team moved into the larger and more modern Rose Garden Arena (since renamed to Moda Center) in 1995. The arena is still actively used for Portland Winterhawks hockey games. The arena is also used for concerts, circuses, rodeos, ice shows, and conventions, and hosted the 2007 Davis Cup final between the United States and Russia. The Coliseum is known as the "Glass Palace".

=== Veterans Memorial ===
The Veterans Memorial was originally built in 1962 and lists the names of servicemembers from the Portland area who died while serving.

=== Transportation and parking ===
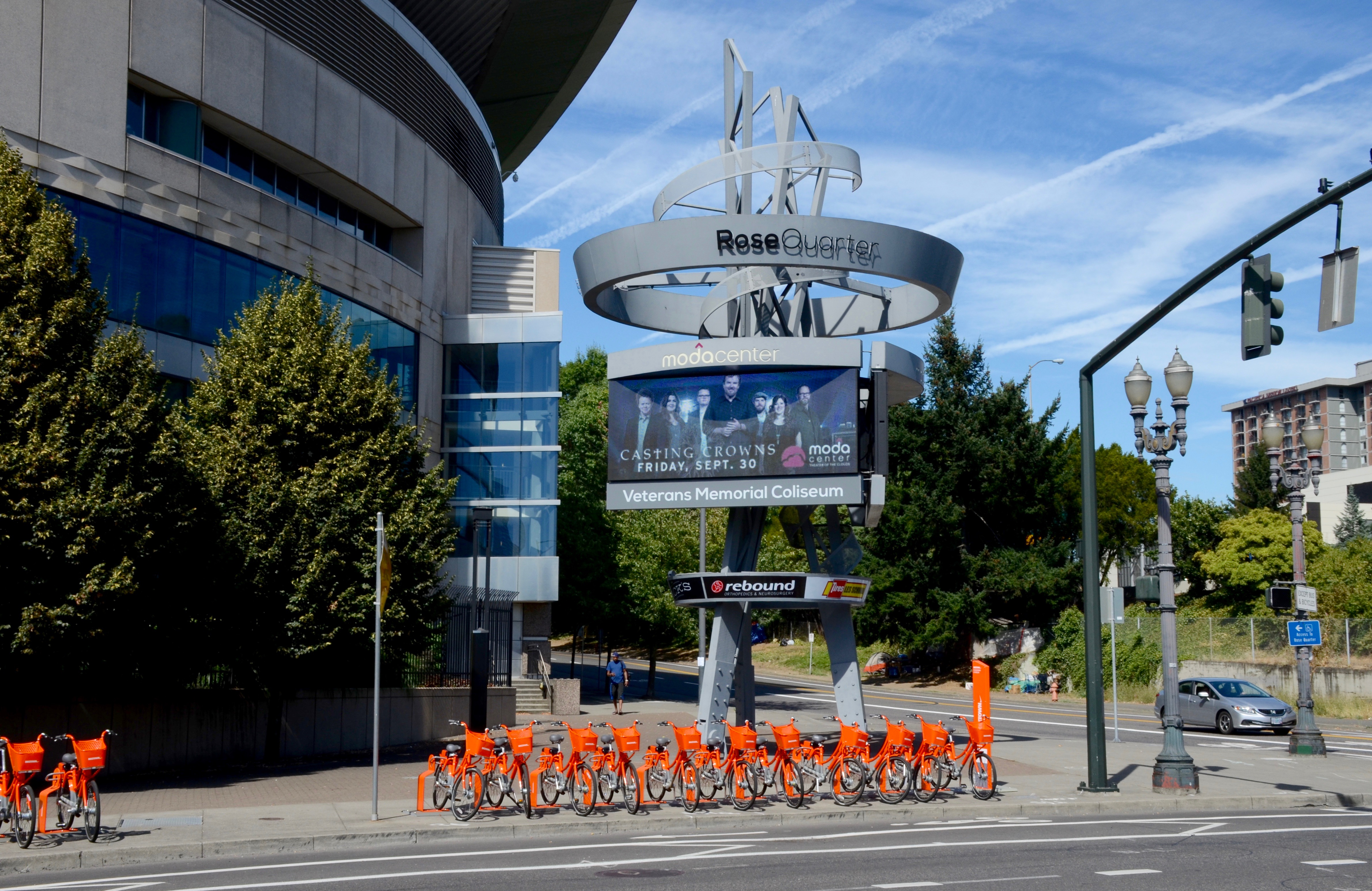
Rose Quarter sign and event marquee, with a Biketown station in the foreground

Two MAX Light Rail stations serve the Rose Quarter area. The Rose Quarter Transit Center is located on the Red, Blue and Green Lines, and is located south of the arena, in an underpass where the tracks cross under Interstate 5. A separate station still part of the transit center, the Interstate/Rose Quarter station, is located on the western side of the Rose Quarter campus and serves riders on the Yellow Line. Tri-Met also operates several bus lines which serve the arena as well as C-Tran's express routes 105 and 105X. The Rose Quarter offers over 2,600 parking spaces for Rose Quarter patrons on the premises. The spaces are distributed among four parking garages and two uncovered parking lots. In addition, arena management operates a pair of off-site parking lots with 1,700 additional spaces, located several blocks from the arena. Both off-site facilities are located on the MAX Light Rail line, which provides service to the Rose Quarter. Parking prices vary depending on the event, typically between US$8 and US$15 per vehicle. The parking garages are operated by City Center Parking. On-street parking near the arena is also available.

== Ownership and management ==
The Rose Quarter is jointly owned by the Vulcan Sports and Entertainment (VSE) and the City of Portland. (VSE) is a subsidiary of Vulcan Inc., a holding company owned by Paul Allen which manages Allen's various sports-related properties. Tod Leiweke is the current president of Vulcan Sports and Entertainment. VSE owns the Moda Center and the underlying land; the City owns the remainder of the Rose Quarter premises.

VSE are responsible for managing all Rose Quarter properties. Management and operation of the Rose Quarter is contracted out to AEG. Who is under contract to run the Garden until August 2008.

== History ==
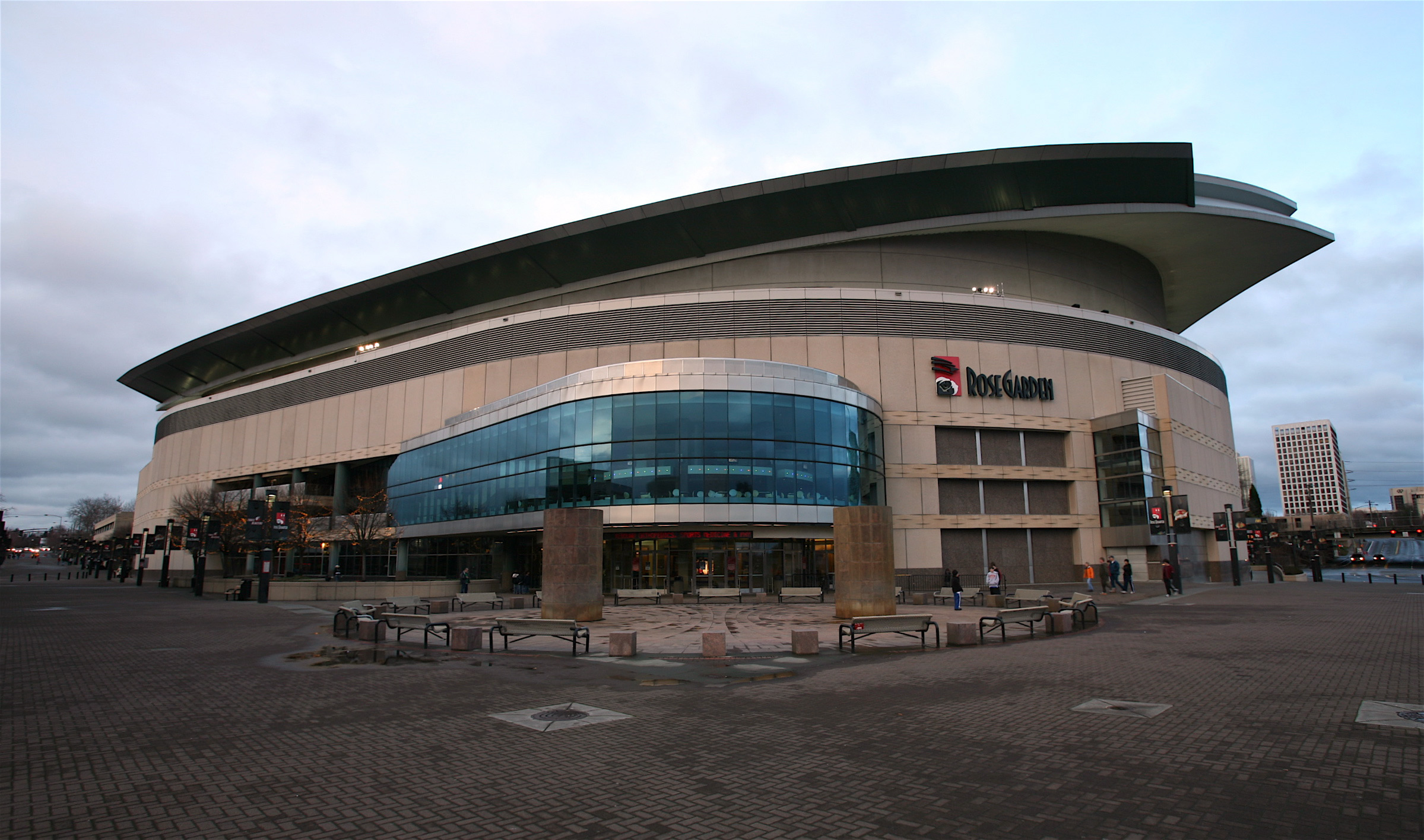
The Moda Center, located in the Rose Quarter

The Rose Quarter was created in 1993, when significant parts of the parking lot of the Memorial Coliseum were transferred to the Oregon Arena Corporation, an operating company owned by Paul Allen, to facilitate construction of the Rose Garden Arena, later renamed the Moda Center. As part of the agreement, the Oregon Arena Corporation would be given the right to jointly manage both the new arena and the existing Coliseum, as well as other facilities and amenities on the grounds. The new arena would soon be christened the "Rose Garden", and the grounds of the Coliseum would be reborn as the Rose Quarter. The City of Portland hoped that the building of the arena would lead to other renovation or development in the Rose Quarter district, but as of 2007 this has yet to materialize. Several restaurants and bars operate on the Rose Quarter property.

Oregon Arena Corporation managed the entire Rose Quarter, including those portions still owned by the city, until it was dissolved in a 2004 bankruptcy. The arena creditors took possession of the Rose Garden and the underlying land, together with the rights to manage other Rose Garden properties; and formed a new corporation, Portland Arena Management LLC ("PAM") to manage the property acquired in the bankruptcy proceedings. PAM soon hired Global Spectrum to operate the arena and the remainder of the Rose Quarter. In 2007, Allen repurchased the arena from the creditors, along with the Rose Quarter management rights; Global Spectrum was retained as the site operator. Global Spectrum is under contract to operate the Rose Quarter until 2008.
