= Fareless Square =

Former zero-fare transport area in Portland, Oregon, U.S.

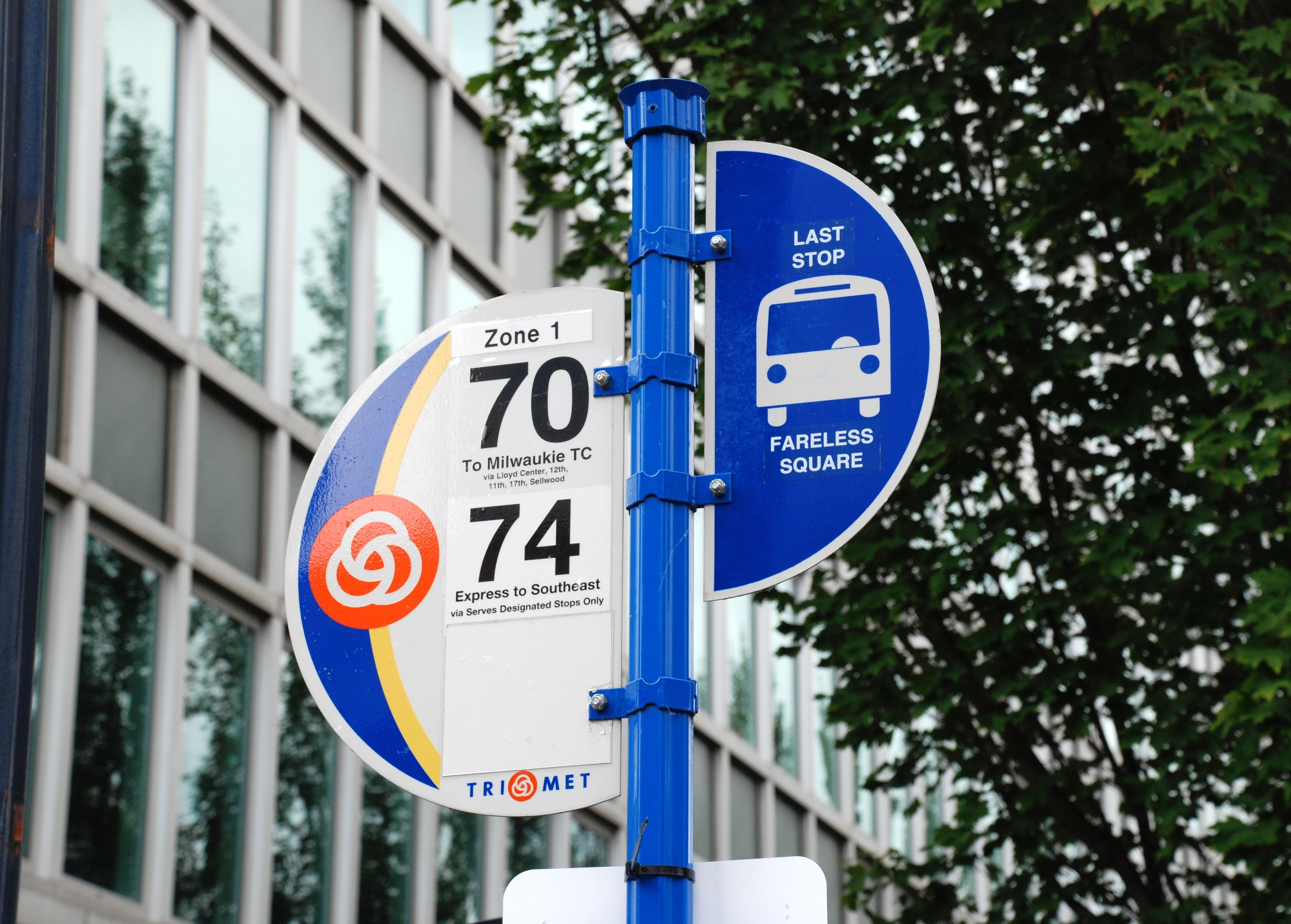
A TriMet bus stop sign with a "Last stop [in] Fareless Square" sign attached, in 2009

Fareless Square was an area within central Portland, Oregon, where all rides on TriMet buses and light rail and the Portland Streetcar were free. It primarily consisted of the downtown area and, after 2001, the Lloyd District. It existed from January 1975 through August 2012, but was briefly renamed the Free Rail Zone in January 2010 after its coverage became limited to light rail and streetcar service, with bus rides no longer being free. The TriMet board decided in June 2012 to discontinue the Free Rail Zone primarily to help fill a large shortfall in the agency's budget, and the action was one component of a package of extensive budget cuts which also included service reductions and fare increases. The Free Rail Zone ended on August 31, 2012.

== Boundaries ==
The boundary of the westside portion of Fareless Square (and later the Free Rail Zone) started at the west foot of the Marquam Bridge, ran northwest along Interstate 405 to Northwest Irving Street, east to the Steel Bridge, then southward along the western shore of the Willamette River. The boundary of the eastside section, added in 2001, started at the east foot of the Steel Bridge, ran northwest to North Interstate Avenue to Multnomah Street, then east to the 1400 block of Northeast Multnomah Street, south to Northeast Holladay Street, and west to the Steel Bridge. By implication the entirety of the Steel Bridge was within the fare-free zone.

According to the TriMet code, the free-ride zone was "within Zone 1" and did not constitute a separate fare zone. TriMet discontinued all fare zones effective September 1, 2012, and no longer uses a zonal, or distance-based, fare system.

== History ==
Adopted in 1975 to combat limited parking and air pollution, Fareless Square initially encompassed the area of downtown Portland between Hoyt Street and Market Street, and from the Willamette River west to I-405. On April 3, 1977, it was expanded southward from Market Street to the point where I-405 meets the river at the Marquam Bridge. A minor adjustment of Fareless Square occurred during the 1990s in order to include the stops for Union Station (Amtrak), by extending the northern limits of the area by one block to Northwest Irving Street.

In 2001, Fareless Square was extended again, this time across the river to the Lloyd District. Included were MAX stations along Holladay Street and bus stops on NE Multnomah Street from the Rose Quarter, past the Oregon Convention Center to the Lloyd Center shopping mall. This was a panhandle-shaped addition to the original free-fare zone, and consequently Fareless Square was, strictly speaking, no longer square-shaped, but it retained its name. In 2007, a pair of stops directly in front of Union Station, added with Portland Mall construction and north of Irving Street, were added to the zone. In its last years, the free-service area covered 1.35 square miles (3.5 km^{2}).

=== "Free Rail Zone" ===
In January 2009, TriMet again raised the idea of reducing the validity of Fareless Square or possibly imposing a discounted fare, of $1, in the area concerned, this time in conjunction with a need to trim its budget in response to a regional economic downturn.

The proposals were refined into one that would eliminate fareless service on buses but keep rail service free. Proponents of this change argued that, with MAX light rail being added along the Portland Transit Mall in 2009, most transit users riding solely within the fareless area would be served by MAX and the Portland Streetcar, and therefore still travel for free. TriMet stated that 93% of all trips made within the fareless zone could be made via the rail system, following the 2009 expansion of MAX coverage within downtown. In addition, bus drivers complained about passengers boarding buses for rides lasting only a few stops within the fareless area, slowing down longer distance riders. In addition, to alleviate concerns about seniors and the disabled in the downtown losing access to free service, a photo ID card would be provided to residents living within the fareless boundaries to ride transit within the current boundary for $10 for two years.

The Portland Business Alliance and tourism bureau supported the move. At that time, the estimated loss of revenue attributed to free rides on buses in the fareless zone was $800,000. In August 2009, the TriMet board approved an ordinance to discontinue the fareless zone on buses but retain it for MAX and the Portland Streetcar. The change took effect in January 2010, with the zone renamed the Free Rail Zone.

TriMet's fiscal year 2013 budget proposed the elimination of the Free Rail Zone effective September 1, 2012, as part of a package of service cuts and other changes intended to deal with a $12 million budget shortfall, and the proposal was approved in June. The fareless zone was discontinued at the end of service on August 31, 2012.

== Controversy ==
From time to time during Fareless Square's history, some in the Portland area called for it to be abolished, for various reasons.

As bus drivers could only request, but not require, payment of fares on bus boardings within Fareless Square, critics of TriMet alleged that the existence of Fareless Square facilitated fare evasion, and thus lost revenue, which must be made up by other means, such as taxation. In particular, riders who boarded in Fareless Square without paying a fare and then knowingly traveled beyond the zone's boundaries would be evading fare payment. Transfers were given to all passengers who paid fares within the fareless zone, which were subject to inspection by fare inspectors or drivers at the first stop outside of the fareless boundary. However, in practice, drivers did not systematically enforce fare collection on bus trips taken from points inside the fare-free zone to points outside it. (In other cities with fareless zones, pay-on-exit is used on trips leaving the fareless area, and that practice was also used by TriMet from 1975 until 1982, when TriMet went to proof-of-payment system-wide until 1984.)

On the MAX Light Rail and Portland Streetcar lines, a proof-of-payment fare system (or "honor" fare system) is used, so the application of the Fareless Square (or Free Rail Zone) meant that fare inspectors did not check passengers' fares within the free-fare zone.

In late 2007, a series of attacks against TriMet passengers, particularly on the MAX Blue Line in Gresham, led to increased public scrutiny of the security of the Portland transit system as a whole. Fareless Square was called into question as part of this inquiry, as it was alleged that the perpetrators of such offenses were often fare evaders who boarded TriMet in Fareless Square, and who then traveled to other areas (such as Gresham) without paying any fare, and that more stringent fare collection would keep such "undesirables" off the trains. TriMet's general manager proposed limiting the hours of Fareless Square to 7 a.m. to 7 p.m. However, others questioned the logic of linking incidents of crime in Gresham with the existence of a free transit zone located several miles away, in downtown Portland, and TriMet's own statistics showed that in 2007 the agency received very few complaints about activities such as drug dealing and panhandling in Fareless Square. TriMet held two public hearings on January 16, 2008 to help determine the future of Fareless Square but, after receiving a large volume of comment from the public, decided to not make any immediate changes.

boundary
coordinates
45.52394°N 122.68621°W
45.51375°N 122.68913°W
45.50638°N 122.68158°W
45.51390°N 122.67317°W
45.52168°N 122.68540°W
45.50502°N 122.67351°W
45.51152°N 122.68845°W
45.52788°N 122.68656°W
45.52388°N 122.66909°W
45.52845°N 122.67218°W
45.52923°N 122.66785°W
45.53173°N 122.66527°W
45.53236°N 122.64922°W
45.52974°N 122.64965°W
45.52962°N 122.66450°W
