= Oregon Convention Center =

Convention center in Portland, Oregon, U.S.

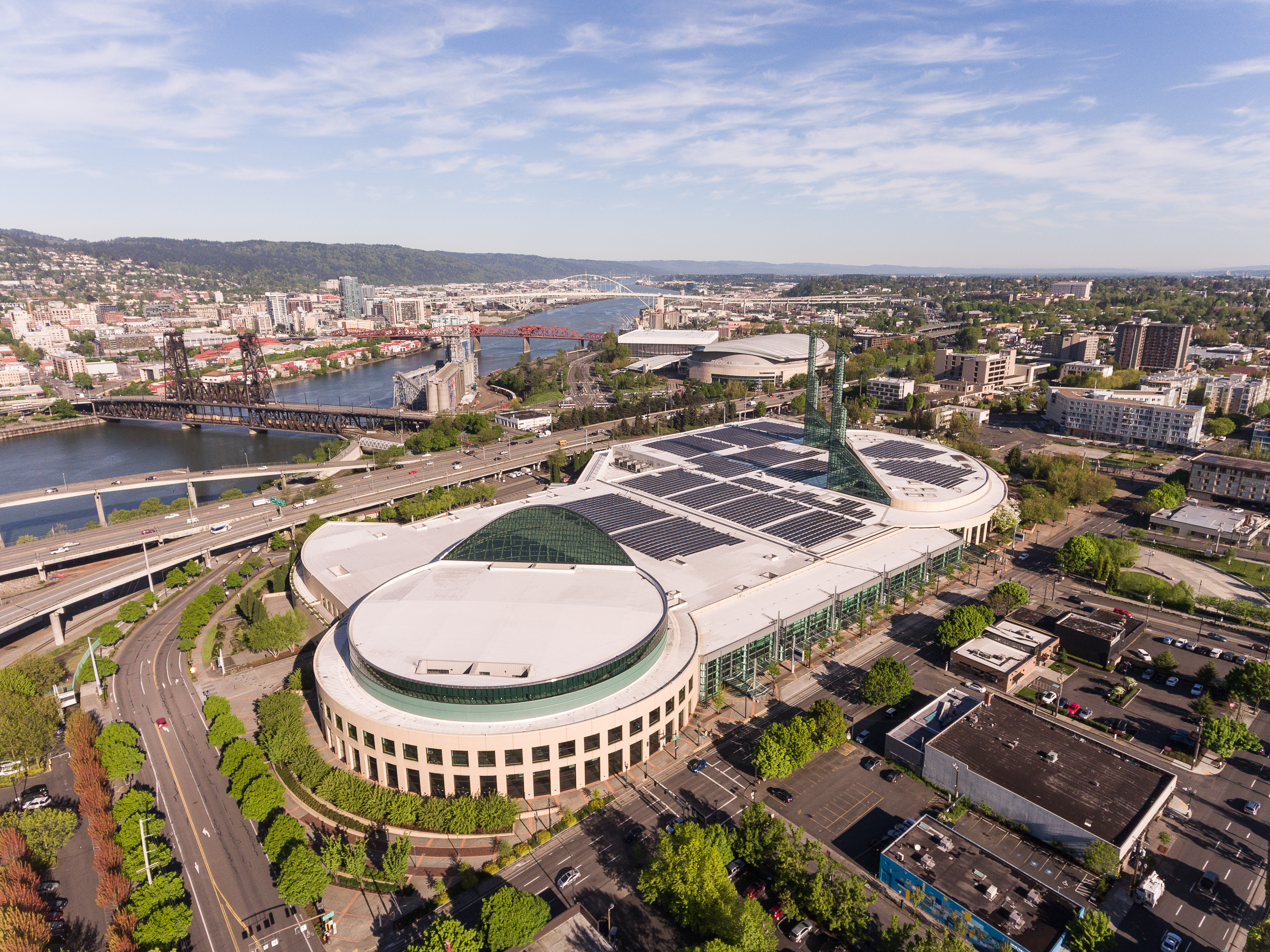

- Location within Portland, Oregon

General information
- Location: Portland, Oregon, 777 NE Martin Luther King Boulevard
- Coordinates: 45.5283°N 122.6631°W
- Construction started: 1987–1988
- Completed: 1990
- Renovated: 2003
- Owner: Metro

Height
- Height: 63 m (207 ft)

Technical details
- Floor count: 4
- Floor area: approx. 1,000,000 sq ft (93,000 m^{2})

Design and construction
- Architecture firm: Zimmer Gunsul Frasca

Other information
- Seating capacity: Detailed venue capacity: Oregon Ballroom: 3,024; Portland Ballroom: 4,220; Exhibit Halls: 24,296
- Public transit: Convention Center; 6, 8, 77; AB

The Oregon Convention Center is a convention center in Portland, Oregon. Completed in 1989 and opened in 1990, it is located on the east side of the Willamette River in the Lloyd District neighborhood. It is best known for the twin spire towers, which provide light into the building's interior and for housing the world's largest Foucault pendulum. The center is owned by Metro, the Portland area's regional government, and operated by the Metropolitan Exposition and Recreation Commission, a subsidiary of Metro.

The building was designed by the architectural firm of Zimmer Gunsul Frasca Architects (ZGF). It is the largest convention center in Oregon, at nearly 1 million square feet (93,000 m^{2}). The complex includes 255,000 square feet (23,700 m^{2}) of exhibit space. It features the largest ballroom in the City of Portland at 35,000 square feet (3,300 m^{2}). The original building was built in the late 1980s, opened in 1990, and was expanded in 2003. ZGF was also involved in designing the expansion. More recently, the building has become known for upward illuminating the twin spires yearly on September 11 in memorial of the events of 9/11.

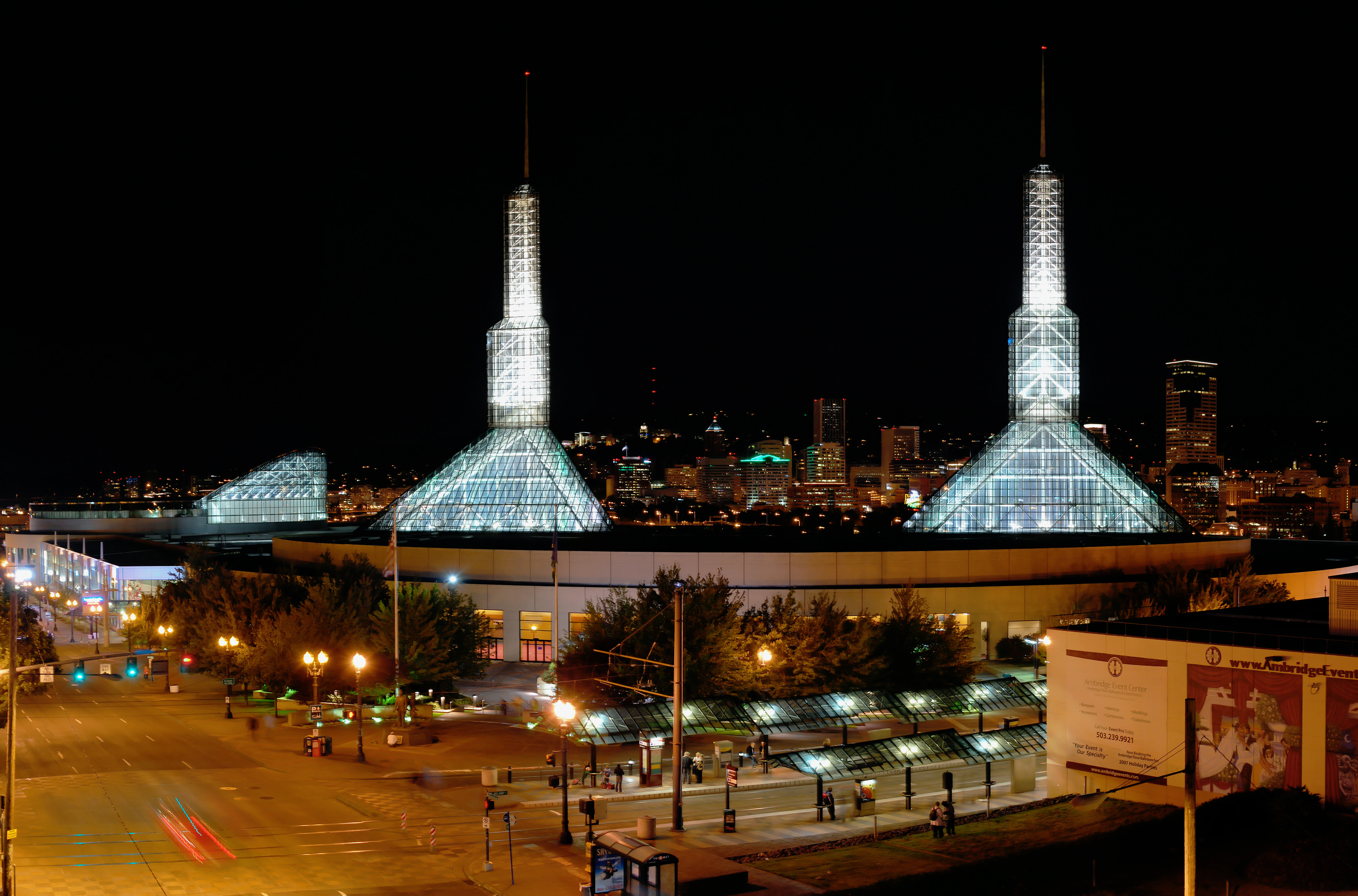
Oregon Convention Center in 2007

The convention center has a focus on sustainability. It was the first existing one to receive the highest, platinum rating in the U.S. Green Building Council's LEED certification program and is the only one to have it for operations and maintenance. A 6,500-panel solar array provides about 25 percent of the electricity used, and is the second largest one on a convention center in the country. The remaining electricity and gas usage is offset with renewable energy credits. In addition, a rain garden filters run off from the roof before it reaches waterways. A waste diversion policy is also in effect, requiring a deposit from large events and banning certain non-recyclable items. Reusable materials and surplus food is donated to local non-profits.

The region's light rail system, TriMet's MAX, serves the center with a station on Holladay Street. The Portland Streetcar system began serving the center in 2012, with the opening of a new line called the CL Line; this was renamed the Loop Service in 2015. TriMet bus route 6 also serves the facility.

The building and grounds also have an extensive set of public art, with works from over two dozen mainly Pacific Northwest artists. The collection includes paintings, plaques, glass and ceramic tiles, sconces, mosaics, bells, and parts of a large Douglas fir. Each of the towers has a focal point artwork, with a colorful 40-foot-long Chinese dragon boat suspended in the east tower, and Principia by Jones/Ginzel, a dramatic Foucault pendulum hanging over a gilded halo of rays and an inlaid fantasy solar system in the floor of the north tower.

Construction on a 30,000-square-foot (2,800 m^{2}), full-block "outdoor plaza" facility for convention-related activities started in 2011 across the street from the center, to the east. The plaza, known as the Oregon Convention Center Plaza, opened in January 2012.

Metro has proposed a 600-room hotel adjacent to the Convention Center, to be built by Mortenson Construction, then owned and operated as a Hyatt Regency. The $212 million hotel would be partially paid for by Metro using $60 million in revenue bonds and $18 million from Oregon Lottery funds, loans, and grants. The plan has attracted criticism from existing hoteliers as being an unfair subsidy, while Metro has championed it as a way to attract larger conventions. Suits from opponents were rejected in county courts, and in May 2015, the Oregon Legislature authorized Metro to issue the bonds. Construction of the Hyatt Regency Portland began in 2017, and the hotel opened in December 2019.

The convention center has hosted the Northwest National Association of Music Education conference. The site is suitable for the event due to a large performing area and multiple rooms for chamber groups and lectures. There is an EMT in the building during events.

The convention center was chosen as the host venue for the 2016 IAAF World Indoor Championships after Portland won their bid over Birmingham, England. For the event, the building was fitted with a 200m track and seating for 8,000 spectators.

On March 20, 2020, amidst the 2019–20 coronavirus pandemic, the center was turned into Portland's second temporary shelter for the homeless population of the city in order to protect them from being infected by COVID-19. The shelter ended when Governor Kate Brown lifted the ban on large public gatherings.

== See also ==
- 2016 IAAF World Indoor Championships
- Portland International Auto Show
