= Metro Streetcar =

Heritage streetcar in Little Rock, Arkansas

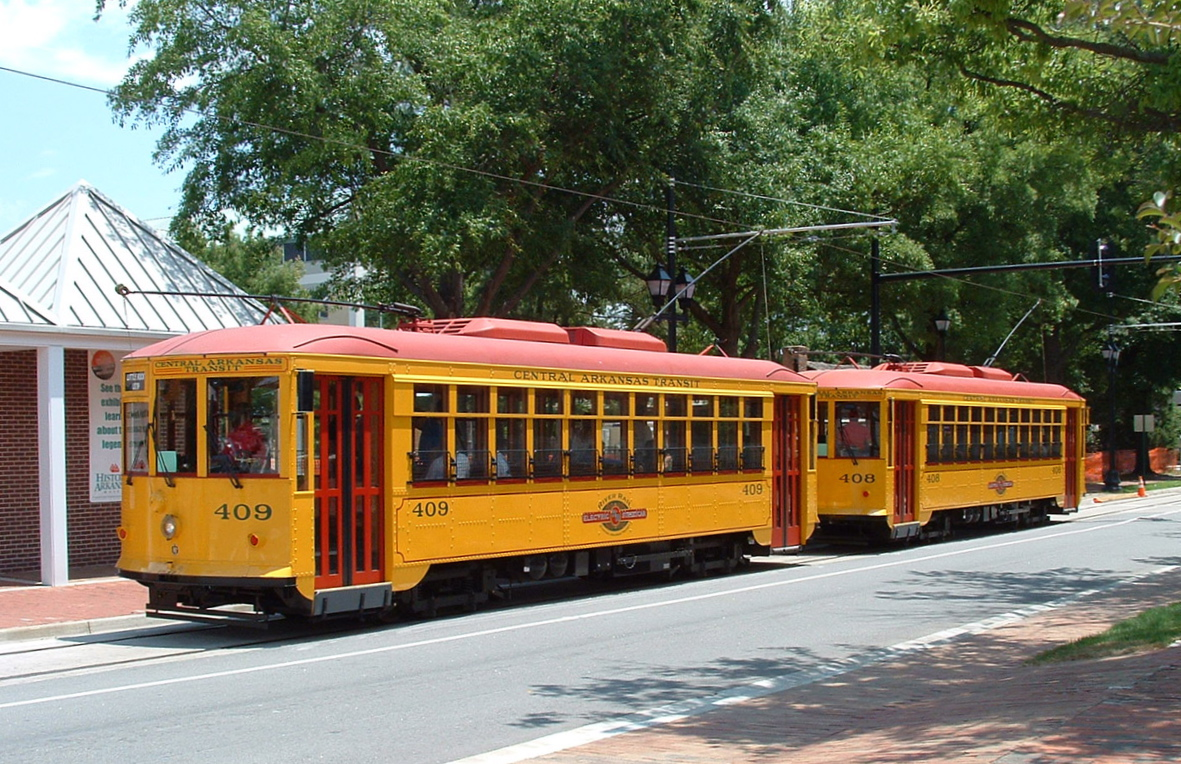
- Two Metro streetcars pause at the Historic Arkansas Museum stop in June 2005

Overview
- Owner: Rock Region Metro
- Locale: Little Rock, Arkansas
- Termini: North Little Rock (north); Presidential Library (south)
- Stations: 15
- Website: rrmetro.org/services/streetcar

Service
- Type: Heritage streetcar
- System: Rock Region Metro
- Rolling stock: 5 cars
- Ridership: 22,600 (2024)

History
- Opened: November 1, 2004; 20 years ago

Technical
- Line length: 3.4 mi (5.5 km)
- Track gauge: 4 ft 8 1/2 in (1,435 mm) standard gauge
- Electrification: Overhead line, 600 V DC

The Metro Streetcar, formerly known as the River Rail Streetcar, is a two line heritage streetcar system operating in Little Rock and North Little Rock, Arkansas. It has operated since November 1, 2004. Most recently expanded in 2007, the streetcar now operates over 3.4 miles (5.5 km) of track in a figure-eight loop pattern. The Metro Streetcar is operated by Rock Region Metro. In 2024, the system had a ridership of 22,600.

== History ==
By the 1890s, Little Rock had begun to grow out into the countryside of Pulaski County in large part due to the construction of a street railway system. Similar to many other cities in the South after the Civil War, Little Rock’s lack of development attracted businessmen eager to take advantage of expected economic growth in real estate, banking, and other merchant ventures. Little Rock's first horsecar line (horse tramway) opened in 1876. The horsecars operated until 1895. Steam-powered streetcars operated between July 3, 1888, and 1889. The construction of street railways in the United States began to overlap with real estate and banking enterprises as the lines electrified in the late 1880s and early 1890s. Electric traction in Little Rock was introduced on December 23, 1891, after consolidation by a company formed to run the streetcar system exclusively. Eventually, that company was bought by Arkansas Power & Light. Electric streetcars operated until September 1, 1947, extending as far west as the city's Hillcrest and Stifft's Station neighborhoods.

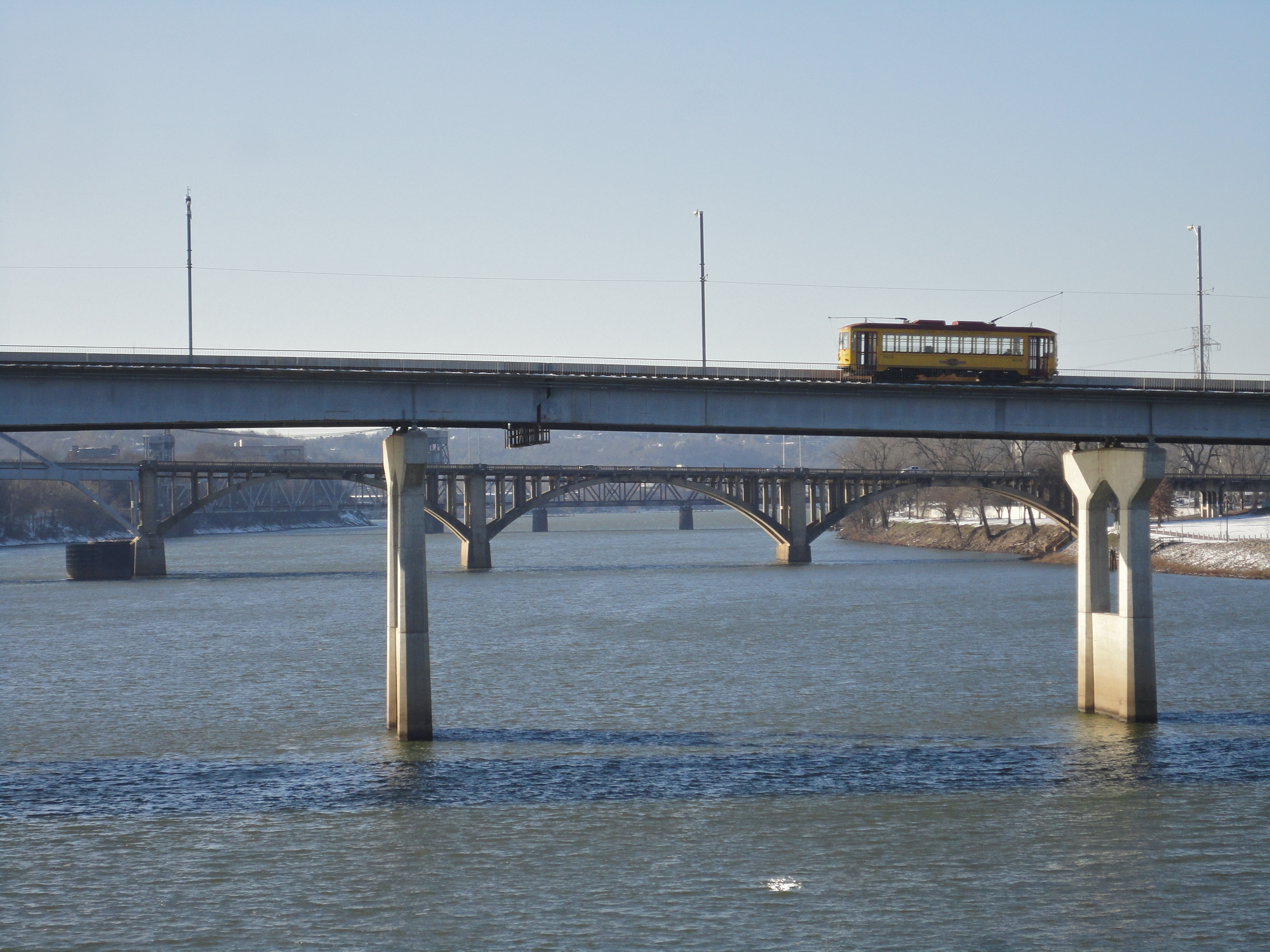
Streetcar crossing the Arkansas River

What is now named the Metro Streetcar opened on November 1, 2004, as the River Rail Streetcar, operated by the Central Arkansas Transit Authority. Phase I consisted of a single 2.5-mile (4.0 km) long line that connects two cities, Little Rock and North Little Rock, situated on opposite sides of the Arkansas River.

The line carried 200,000 passengers in its first year of operation.

In January 2006, construction began on Phase II, which was a 0.9-mile (1.4 km) extension to the William J. Clinton Presidential Center and Heifer International headquarters. This section opened on February 16, 2007, with a ribbon cutting by Pulaski County Judge Buddy Villines, Little Rock Mayor Mark Stodola, and North Little Rock Mayor Pat Hays. The extension increased the length of the line by about 33%, making the total mileage 3.4 miles (5.5 km).

In 2015, the Central Arkansas Transit Authority changed its name to Rock Region Metro, and in line with this rebranding, the River Rail Streetcar was renamed the Metro Streetcar.

== Operation ==
=== Hours and frequency ===
The Metro Streetcar begins operations at approximately 8:30 a.m. Monday through Saturdays and at 10 a.m. Sundays, while it ends at approximately 10 p.m. Monday through Wednesdays, midnight on Fridays and Saturdays and at 5:30 p.m. on Sundays. It consists of two lines: the Blue Line and the Green Line. The Blue Line operates seven days a week, with extended service on Friday and Saturday nights and runs between Little Rock and North Little Rock, while the Green Line operates six days a week only with no Sunday service and runs in a circulator. Frequencies per line consist of 25-minute headways during the day, with 20-minute headways during evening and night-and-weekend service periods.

=== Stations ===
The trolley stops at many downtown attractions, from the Clinton Library to the historic River Market. The stops include the Marriott Hotel, Heifer Intl., and the Historic Arkansas Museum. Stations continue into the rapidly rejuvenating area of North Little Rock known as Argenta. Stops there include access to the USS Razorback (SS-394) WWII submarine, trolley barn, Verizon Arena, and the Dickey-Stephens Park (home of the Arkansas Travelers).

The stops are indicated with 10-foot (3.05 m)-tall black signs and yellow sidewalk "bumps" curbside with the system map posted at each stop. Trolleys cannot be hailed between stops.

Both stops and cars can be sponsored for a donation.

=== Lines ===
Blue Line
Green Line

=== Stop list ===
Highlighted stops indicate daytime only service

No.	Stop	Jurisdiction	Line(s)	Notes
1	Main St & Bishop Lindsey Av	North Little Rock		Serves Argenta Historic District
2	Maple St & Sixth St	North Little Rock		
3	Maple St & Broadway St	North Little Rock		
4	120 Main St	North Little Rock		Serves North Little Rock City Hall, Riverfront Park and Simmons Bank Arena
5	Scott St & Markham St	Little Rock		Serves Little Rock Chamber of Commerce
6	River Market Av & President Clinton Av	Little Rock		Serves Breciding Riverfront Park and Junction Bridge
7	River Market Av & Third St	Little Rock		Serves River Market District
8	World Av & Third St	Little Rock		Serves Clinton Presidential Center and Heifer International
9	Third St & River Market Av	Little Rock		Serves River Market District
10	Second St & Rock St	Little Rock		Serves Central Arkansas Library System Main Library
11	Second St & Scott St	Little Rock		Serves Historic Arkansas Museum
12	Second St & Center St	Little Rock		
13	West Markham St & Spring St	Little Rock		Serves Robinson Auditorium
14	West Markham St & Scott St	Little Rock		Serves Little Rock Marriott Hotel, Capital Hotel and Statehouse Convention Center
15	Main St & Fifth St	North Little Rock		Serves Argenta Historic District

== Expansion ==
Additional extensions to the system are under discussion, the most ambitious of which is a 2.5-mile (4 km) extension to Clinton National Airport. If the expansion is completed, the status of the line could take on a role as some form of light rail line, instead of its current role as a heritage trolley. The proposed extension, among others in Savannah and Tampa, is considered a hybrid form of transport known as "rapid streetcar". The expansion of the River Rail Streetcar line, turning it into a more effective rail rapid transit line, would be the first example of such a system in the United States.

== Rolling stock ==
Metro Streetcar initially used three replica vintage electric trolleys. Two more streetcars were added as a part of the new Phase II extension. The design of these cars is generally similar to Birney-type streetcars used in Little Rock until after World War II. The original number series for those cars was 400–407. The present cars continue that number series, albeit 60 years later, with the current cars being numbered 408–412. All of the cars in the present fleet were manufactured by the Gomaco Trolley Company.

== See also ==
- List of heritage railways
- Streetcars in North America
