= Baring Cross, Arkansas =

Coordinates: 34.763°N 92.282°W

Baring Cross was a town in Pulaski County, Arkansas, United States, across the Arkansas River from Little Rock in the central part of the state.

== History ==
Taking its name from the first bridge in the area to cross the Arkansas River in 1873, Baring Cross was a small incorporated municipality during the late 19th and early 20th century located west of Pike Avenue in present-day North Little Rock, Arkansas. Growing out the developments of the Cairo and Fulton Railroad Company, the town had its origins in the pioneer families of Josiah M. Giles and Emmanuel Boone, who controlled an area along the river west of the town of Argenta. After the opening of the Baring Cross bridge to replace the ineffective ferry system and the proximity to later developing railroad maintenance facilities, the town developed as a small community of middle-class railroad workers.

The facility, now owned by the Union Pacific system, is still in use today and employs a large number of residents. The town grew steadily as it incorporated in 1896 and elected Mord Roberts, a railroad mechanic, its first mayor and five councilmen. Under Roberts’ leadership, the town expanded housing and annexed two additions in 1898 and 1903. The additions of schools and churches as well as the development of Pike avenue as main street for the town with hotels, stores, and restaurants promoted the growth of other larger businesses, such as the Vestal Florist Company and the Arkansas Industrial Company, which produced tile and brick.

The historian and folklorist Walter B. Metz, who grew up in Baring Cross, recalled that “families were large, money was scarce and three square meals a day was actually a luxury.” In 1903, Baring Cross (then a part of Argenta) was annexed by North Little Rock.

As part of the federal Neighborhood Stabilization program in 2010 and partnership with the Argenta Community Development Corporation, $8.4 million was provided for the development of public works and housing construction as well as private funds for residential and commercial development. Later projects included construction of the $3.8 million Rockwater Marina, a $1.9 million traffic roundabout, and extensions to Rockwater Boulevard.

== Notable people ==
- Mord Roberts
