= Faucette Building =

- U.S. National Register of Historic Places
- U.S. Historic district – Contributing property
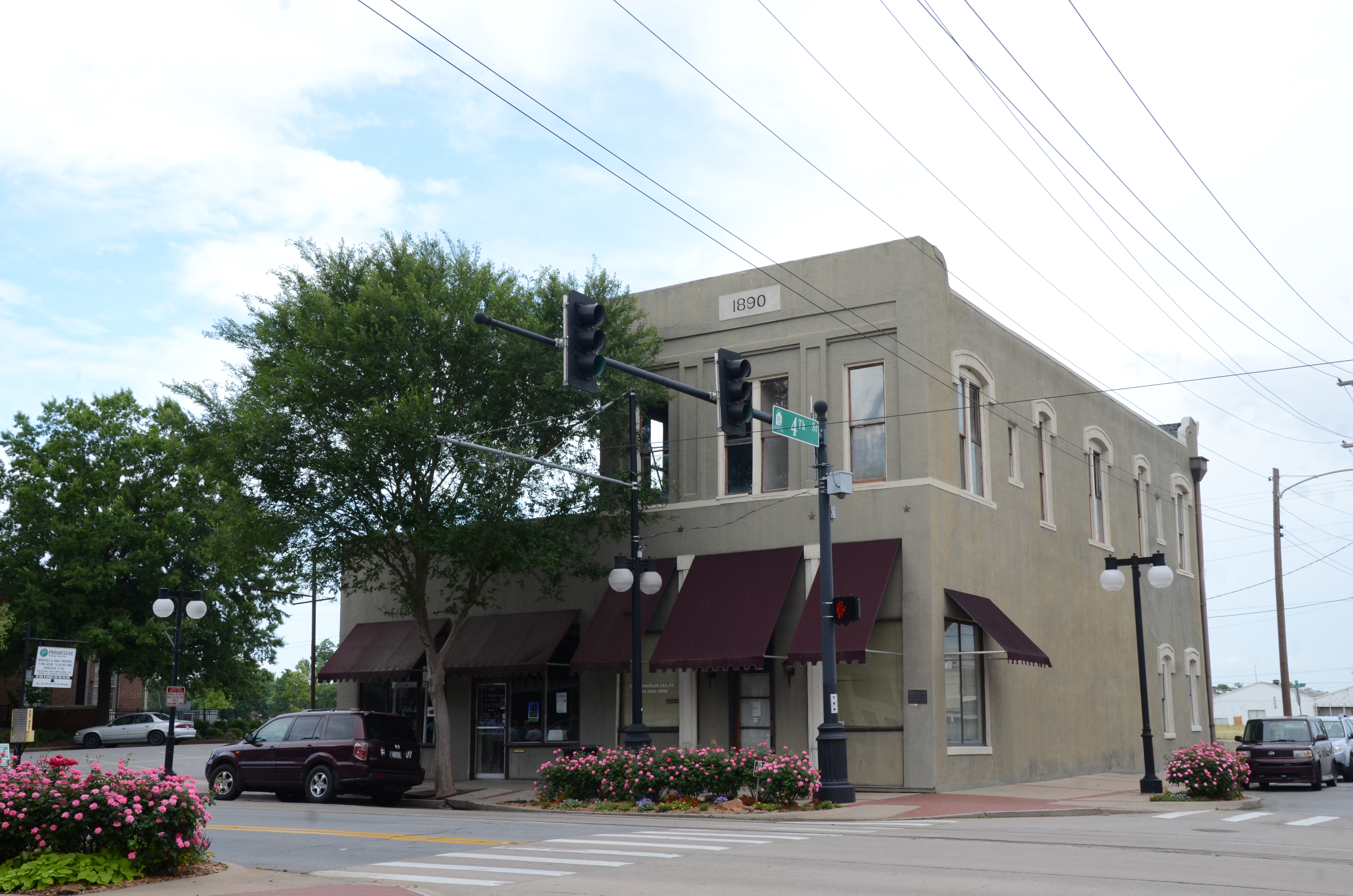

- Location within Arkansas Location within the United States
- Location: 4th and Main Sts., North Little Rock, Arkansas
- Coordinates: 34°45′26″N 92°16′1″W
- Area: less than one acre
- Built: 1891
- Part of: Argenta Historic District (ID93000094)
- NRHP reference No.: 78000628

Significant dates
- Added to NRHP: December 6, 1978
- Designated CP: March 15, 1993

The Faucette Building is a historic commercial building at 4th and Main Streets in North Little Rock, Arkansas. It is a two-story masonry structure, with three storefronts, and a false parapet above the second floor. It was built in 1890 by William Faucette, one of the leading citizens of the unincorporated area of Argenta. The area was annexed to Little Rock in the 1890s, and it was Faucette who engineered the formation of North Little Rock in the early 20th century.

The building was listed on the National Register of Historic Places in 1978. It is also a contributing property to the commercial section of the Argenta Historic District.

== See also ==
- National Register of Historic Places listings in Pulaski County, Arkansas
