= List of mayors of North Little Rock, Arkansas =

Mayor of North Little Rock, Arkansas
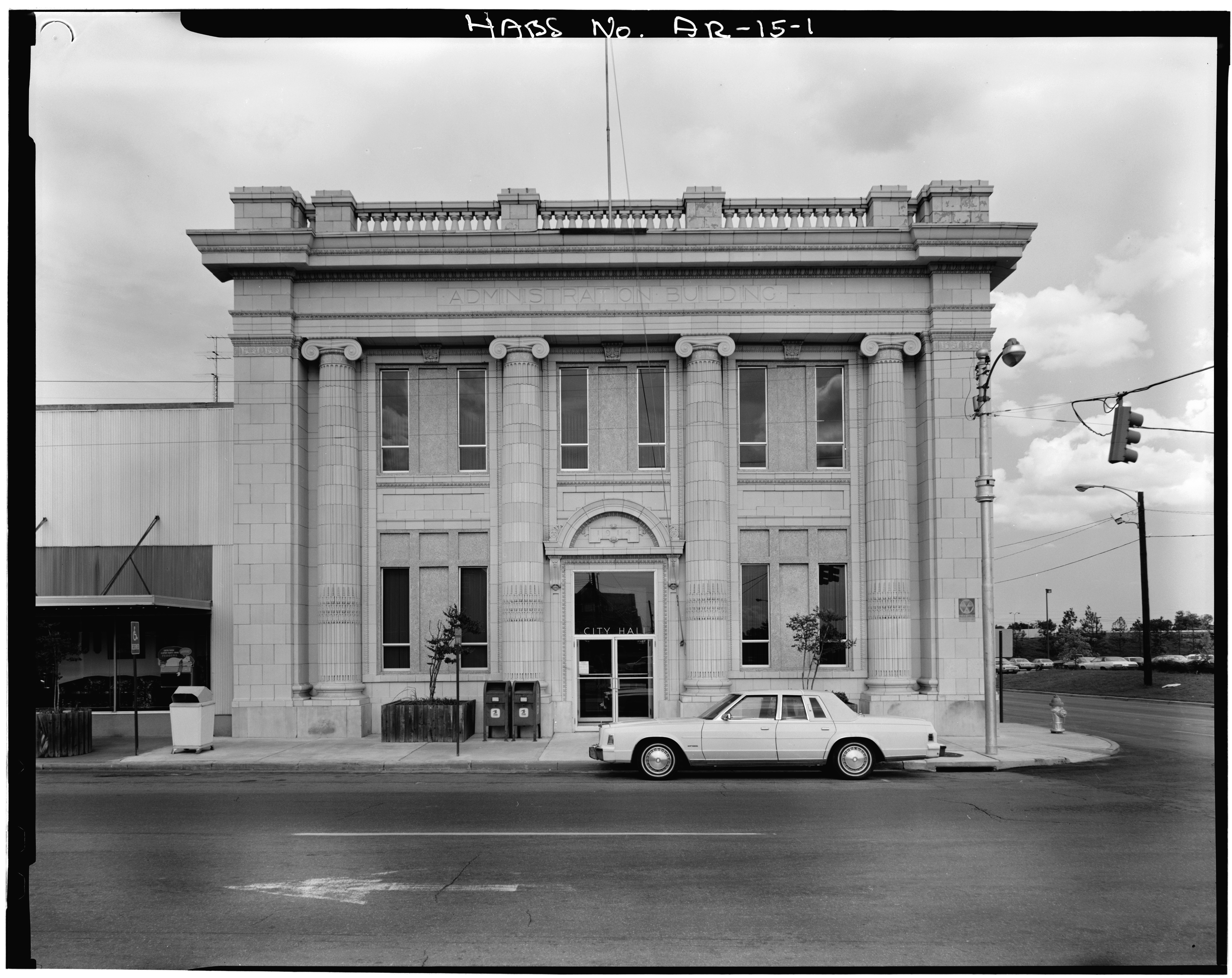
- Incumbent; Terry C. Hartwick since January 1, 2021

The following is a list of mayors of the city of North Little Rock, Arkansas, United States.

- Frank Cook, c.1901
- William Mara, c.1902
- Michael Brown, c.1903
- William Chesley Faucette, 1904-1909, 1910-1911
- Edward A. Ramsey, 1909-1910
- James P. Faucette, 1911-1915
- Mord Roberts, 1915-1917 (acting mayor)
- William M. Burns, c.1919
- Ross L. Lawhon, c.1952-1953
- A. C. Perry, c.1954-1956
- William F. “Casey” Laman, 1958-1972, 1979-1980
- Eddie Powell, 1974-1979
- Terry Hartwick, 1985-1988, 2020–present
- Patrick Henry Hays, 1989–2013
- Joe Smith, c.2014-2019

== See also ==
- North Little Rock City Hall
- North Little Rock history
- List of mayors of places in Arkansas
