= Mord Roberts =

American politician

Mord Roberts was the first of only two mayors of the town of Baring Cross, Arkansas (a formerly incorporated municipality in what is now North Little Rock) in the late 19th century.

== Early life ==
Mord Roberts came to the Baring Cross area in 1893. He was a master mechanic for the Iron Mountain Railway Company, brought in to work at the maintenance shop in Baring Cross. Baring Cross was a small area west of the small city of Argenta and north of the Baring Cross Bridge, which is how the area got its name, and across the Arkansas River from Little Rock, Arkansas. It got started up as a Railroad town, most of its population working for the Iron Mountain Railway Company. In the early 1890s the leaders in Little Rock saw an opportunity to expand it influence and economic bases across the river and annexed the town of Argenta in 1890. With the fear of Little Rock also annexing them, forty-four residents petitioned for the area to be incorporated into a city. On April 8, 1896 the Arkansas Secretary of State approved the incorporation of the city.

== Mayor of Baring Cross ==
Roberts was elected as mayor on the same day as the city was incorporated and continued the housing projects while also expanding the city by annexing the areas north, east and west of the city. Taking land that Little Rock was going after and moving up to the border of Little Rock's eighth ward, formerly known as Argenta.

== Later life ==
Roberts continued to serve the area of Baring Cross even after it was annexed by the city of North Little Rock, becoming one of its aldermen. Roberts was later the acting mayor in 1915-1916 due to the leave of Mayor James P. Faucette.

== See also ==
- List of mayors of North Little Rock, Arkansas
