= Barth-Hempfling House =

Historic house in Arkansas, United States

- U.S. National Register of Historic Places
- U.S. Historic district – Contributing property
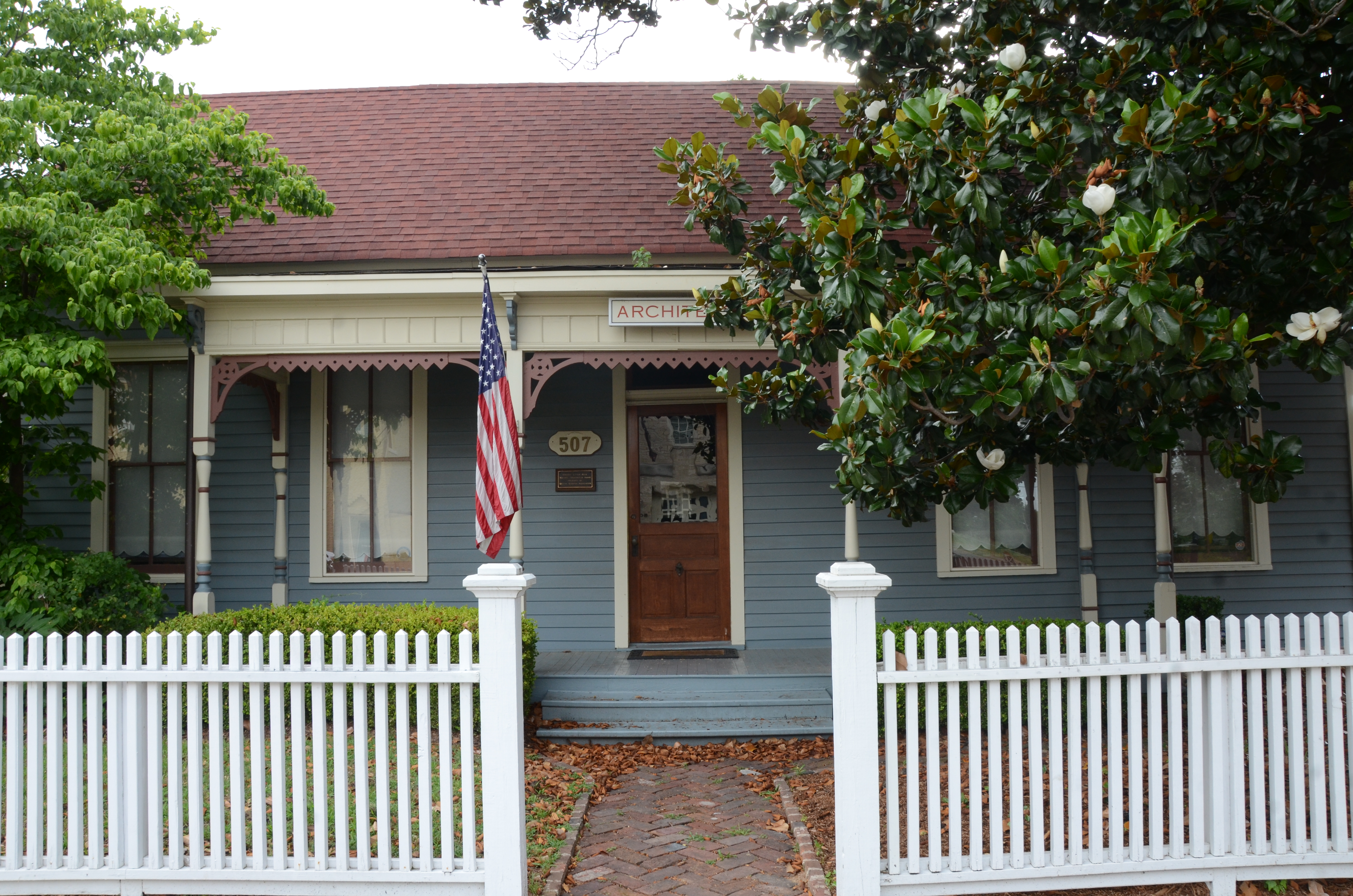

- Location within Arkansas Location within the United States
- Location: 507 Main St., North Little Rock, Arkansas
- Coordinates: 34°46′3″N 92°16′3″W
- Area: less than one acre
- Built: 1886
- Architectural style: Late Victorian
- Part of: Argenta Historic District (ID93000094)
- NRHP reference No.: 86002860

Significant dates
- Added to NRHP: October 16, 1986
- Designated CP: March 15, 1993

The Barth-Hempfling House is a historic house at 507 Main Street in North Little Rock, Arkansas. It is a single-story wood-frame structure, five bays wide, with a side gable roof and vernacular Late Victorian styling. It was built in 1886 for German immigrants, and is the last surviving house on Main Street in downtown North Little Rock, an area that was once lined with similar houses.

The house was listed on the National Register of Historic Places in 1986. It is also a contributing element of the Argenta Historic District.

== See also ==
- National Register of Historic Places listings in Pulaski County, Arkansas
