= Baker House (North Little Rock, Arkansas) =

Historic house in Arkansas, United States

- U.S. National Register of Historic Places
- U.S. Historic district – Contributing property
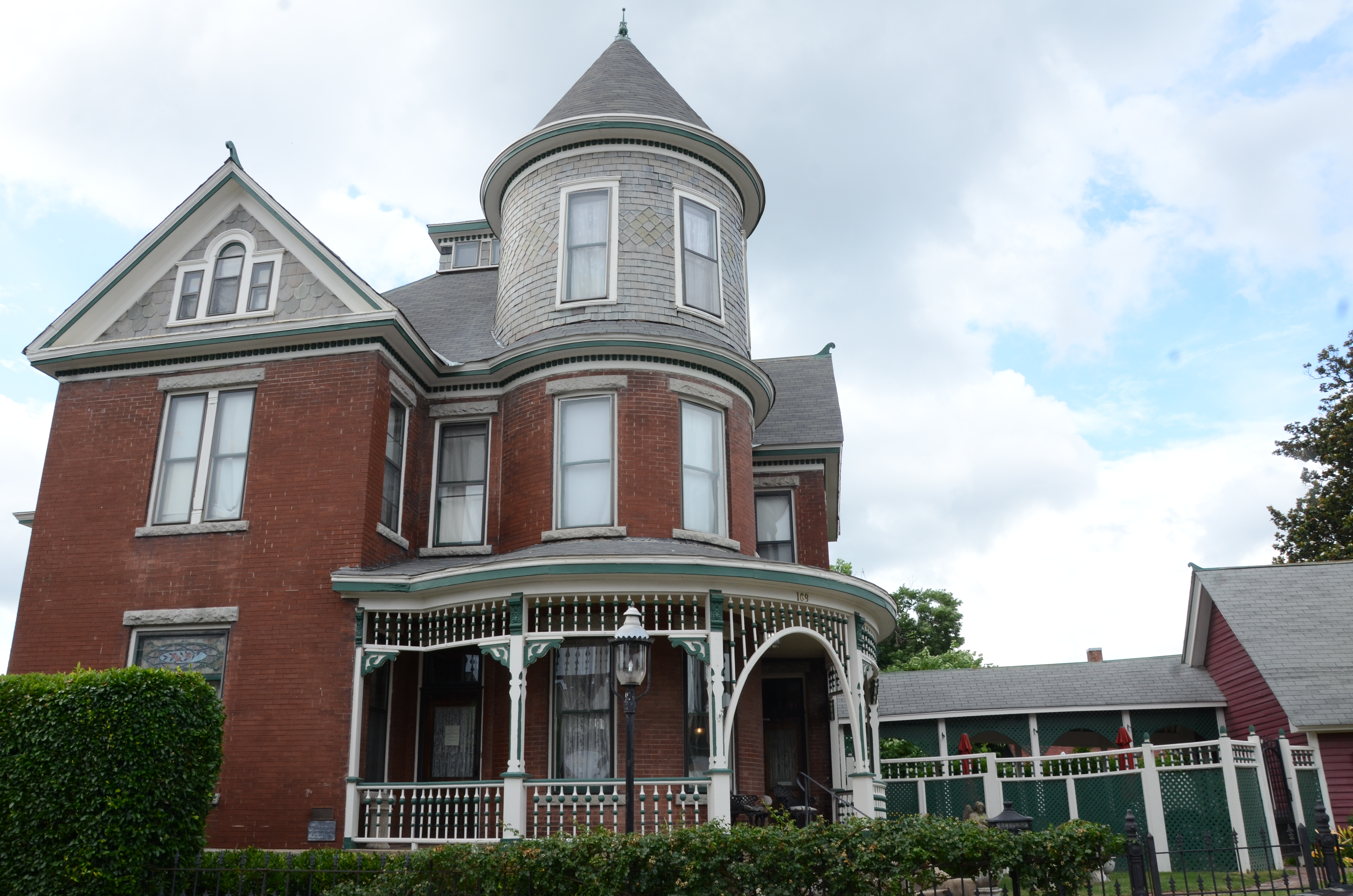

- Location within Arkansas Location within the United States
- Location: 501 Main St. North Little Rock, Arkansas
- Coordinates: 34°45′30″N 92°16′5″W
- Area: less than one acre
- Built: 1898
- Built by: A. E. Colburn
- Architectural style: Queen Anne
- Part of: Argenta Historic District (ID93000094)
- NRHP reference No.: 78000627

Significant dates
- Added to NRHP: December 6, 1978
- Designated CP: March 15, 1993

The Baker House is a historic house at 501 Main Street in North Little Rock, Arkansas, United States. Built in 1898–99, it is one of the few surviving high-style Queen Anne Victorians in the city. It was built by A. E. Colburn, a local contractor, as his private residence. It is an L-shaped structure, 2½ stories in height, with a three-story round tower at the crook of the L. A highly decorated porch is built around the tower, providing access to the entrance.

In 1916, the house was purchased by C. J. and Annie Baker. He had served as the superintendent of North Little Rock's schools from 1904 to 1906. The house became associated with his name.

The house was listed on the National Register of Historic Places in 1978. It is also listed in the residential section of the Argenta Historic District.

It is now operated as "The Baker", a boutique hotel and Airbnb.

== See also ==
- National Register of Historic Places listings in Pulaski County, Arkansas
