= Simmons Bank Arena =

Arena in North Little Rock, Arkansas

Coordinates: 34°45′18.40″N 92°15′51.98″W

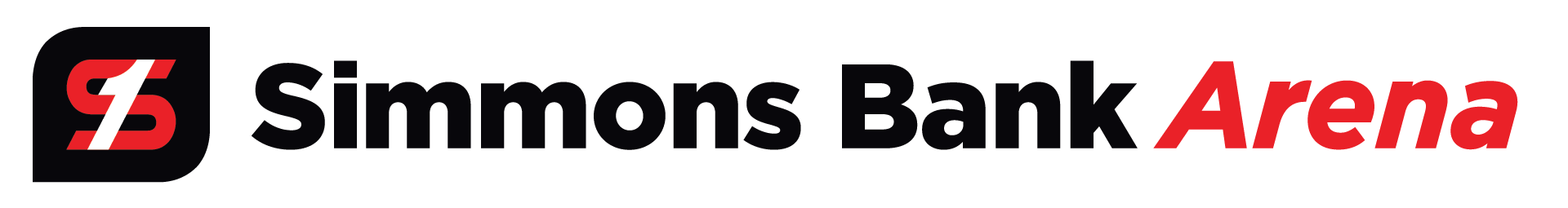

- Aerial view, 2026
- Interactive map of Simmons Bank Arena
- Former names: Alltel Arena (1999–2009); Verizon Arena (2009–2019)
- Location: 1 Simmons Bank Arena Drive; North Little Rock, Arkansas 72114
- Owner: Pulaski County Multi-Purpose Civic Center Facilities Board
- Operator: Pulaski County Multi-Purpose Civic Center Facilities Board
- Capacity: Basketball: 18,000; Hockey: 17,000; Arena football:16,000
- Surface: Multi-surface
- Public transit: Simmons Bank Arena Plaza (120 Main Street): Metro Streetcar Blue Line; Rock Region Metro; 4 / Levy-Amboy; 10 / McCain Mall; Washington Ave & Olive St: Rock Region Metro; 18 / McAlmont

Construction
- Groundbreaking: August 22, 1997
- Opened: October 2, 1999
- Cost: $80 million ($155 million in 2025 dollars)
- Architects: Civic Center Design Team (CCDT): Burt Taggart & Associates, Architects/Engineers, The Wilcox Group, Garver & Garver Engineering and Rosser International of Atlanta
- Structural engineer: Geiger Engineers PC
- General contractor: Turner/Vratsinas

Tenants
- Arkansas–Little Rock Trojans (NCAA) (1999–2005); Arkansas RiverBlades (ECHL) (1999–2003); Arkansas Twisters/Diamonds (af2/IFL) (2000–2010); Arkansas RimRockers (ABA/NBA D-League) (2004–2007)

Website
- simmonsbankarena.com

Simmons Bank Arena (previously Verizon Arena and Alltel Arena) is an 18,000-seat multi-purpose arena in North Little Rock, Arkansas, directly across the Arkansas River from downtown Little Rock. Opened in October 1999, it is the main entertainment venue serving Central Arkansas.

The Little Rock Trojans, representing the University of Arkansas at Little Rock in NCAA Division I sports, played home basketball games at the arena from the time the arena opened until the team moved in 2005 to a new arena, the Jack Stephens Center, on the school's campus in Little Rock. The Arkansas RiverBlades, a defunct ice hockey team of the ECHL; and the Arkansas RimRockers, a defunct minor league basketball team of the NBA Development League, and the Arkansas Twisters, a defunct af2 team, also played at the arena. The arena is also used for concerts, rodeos, auto racing, professional wrestling, and trade shows and conventions.

== History ==
On August 1, 1995, Pulaski County, Arkansas, voters approved a one-year, one-cent sales tax for the purpose of building a multi-purpose arena, expanding the Statehouse Convention Center in Little Rock, and making renovations to the Main Street bridge between Little Rock and North Little Rock. $20 million of the sales tax proceeds went toward the Convention Center expansion, with the remainder used to build the arena.

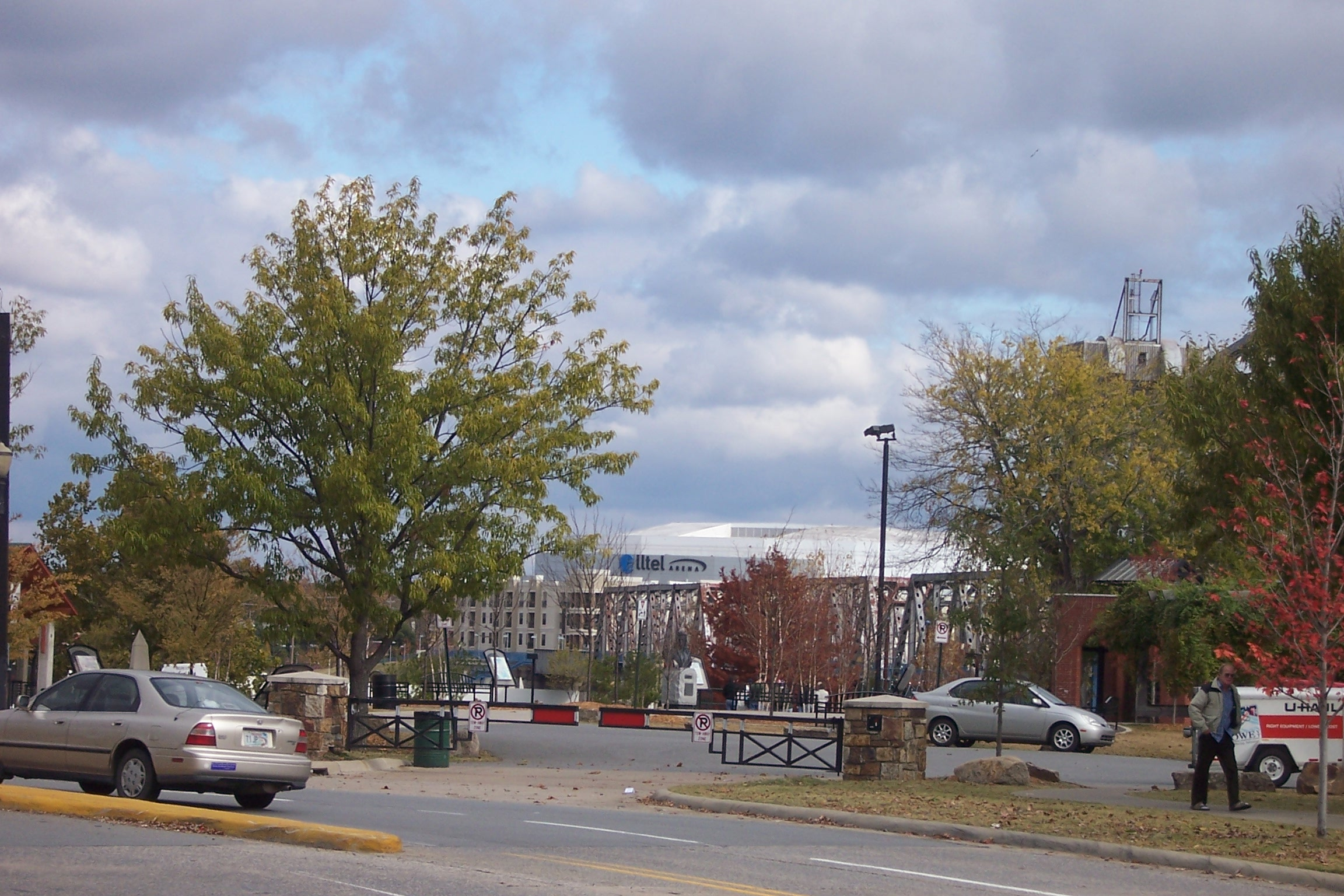
Alltel Arena, as seen in 2008 from Little Rock.

That money—combined with a $20 million contribution from the State of Arkansas, $17 million from private sources, and $7 million from Little Rock-based Alltel Corporation—paid for the construction of the 377,000-square-foot (35,000 m^{2}) arena, which cost nearly $80 million to build. When its doors opened in 1999, the facility was paid for, and there was no public indebtedness.

Two sites in North Little Rock drew interest from county officials for the proposed arena. The first was a 19.5-acre (79,000 m^{2}) commercial site west of Interstate 30, which contained a strip mall, a Kroger, and an abandoned Kmart storefront (which in turn relocated to McCain Plaza in 1991, closing the Broadway Street location and closed in November 2000 as it was one of the 72 stores announced for closure that year). The second site was an 11.6-acre (47,000 m^{2}) plot at the foot of the Broadway Bridge.

The Pulaski County Multipurpose Civic Center Facilities Board selected the larger site for the arena in 1996 and paid $3.7 million for the land, some of which was acquired through eminent domain, a move protested in court by several landowners.

The second site later would be chosen for the new baseball stadium, Dickey-Stephens Park, constructed for the Arkansas Travelers. The Class AA minor-league baseball team moved from the then 73-year-old Ray Winder Field in Little Rock to a new $28 million home in North Little Rock at the start of the 2007 season.

The arena was the home of the 2003, 2006, and 2009 Southeastern Conference women's basketball tournament and the 2000 Sun Belt Conference men's basketball tournament. The arena holds the all-time attendance record for an SEC Women's Tournament when 43,642 people attended the event in 2003.

The arena hosted portions of the first and second rounds of the NCAA Division I men's basketball tournament in March 2008 and the SEC gymnastics championships in 2007.

The arena is also used for other events: concerts (seating capacity is between 15,000 and 18,000 for end-stage concerts; the arena has an 80-by-40-foot portable stage); rodeos and auto racing (seating capacity is 14,000); and trade shows and conventions (there are 28,000 square feet (2,600 m^{2}) of arena floor space plus 7,050 square feet (655 m^{2}) of meeting space and 2,580 square feet (240 m^{2}) of pre-function space). As a concert venue, its location prompted Bruce Springsteen and the E Street Band to play one of its most rarely performed numbers, 1973's "Mary Queen of Arkansas", during a March 2000 show on their Reunion Tour.

The arena is owned by the Multi-Purpose Civic Center Facilities Board for Pulaski County. The arena was designed by the Civic Center Design Team (CCDT), Burt Taggart & Associates, Architects/Engineers, The Wilcox Group, Garver & Garver Engineering and Rosser International of Atlanta.

The arena held the 2004, 2007 and 2009 American Idols LIVE! Tour concerts on August 13, 2004, July 13, 2007, and July 25, 2009, respectively.

The arena's 20-year naming rights were part of a $28.1 billion sale of Alltel to Verizon Wireless, effective on June 30, 2009, with Alltel Arena renamed as Verizon Arena.

Fleetwood Mac performed at the arena May 4, 2013, with surprise guests former president Bill Clinton and First Lady Hillary Clinton attending the show. Fleetwood Mac drummer Mick Fleetwood introduced the couple, who were seated in an arena suite, to the sold-out audience and dedicated the song "Don't Stop" to them, which was Bill Clinton's 1992 presidential election campaign song.

Garth Brooks performed a three-show run at the arena as part of his 2014 World Tour, selling more than 44,000 tickets and setting a record for ticket sales at an entertainment event in Arkansas.

On October 5, 2016, the arena hosted the Kellogg's Tour of Gymnastics Champions.

With expiration of initial naming rights due in 2019, new naming rights for the arena were purchased by Arkansas-based Simmons Bank in a deal announced on November 9, 2018; the name change became official on October 3, 2019.

On January 29, 2022, Elton John performed at the arena for his Goodbye Yellow Brick Road farewell tour to a sold out audience.

Later in 2022, The Eagles played at Simmons Bank Arena on November 27 during their Hotel California tour. The show featured country star Vince Gill, Deacon Frey - son of founding band member Glenn Frey, the Arkansas Symphony Orchestra, and members of the Little Rock Saint Mark's Baptist Church choir. The concert was a sellout.

On July 17, 2024, the arena hosted Dynamite 250, the 250th episode of All Elite Wrestling's weekly show Dynamite.
