= Rock Region Metro =

Transit authority of Little Rock, Arkansas

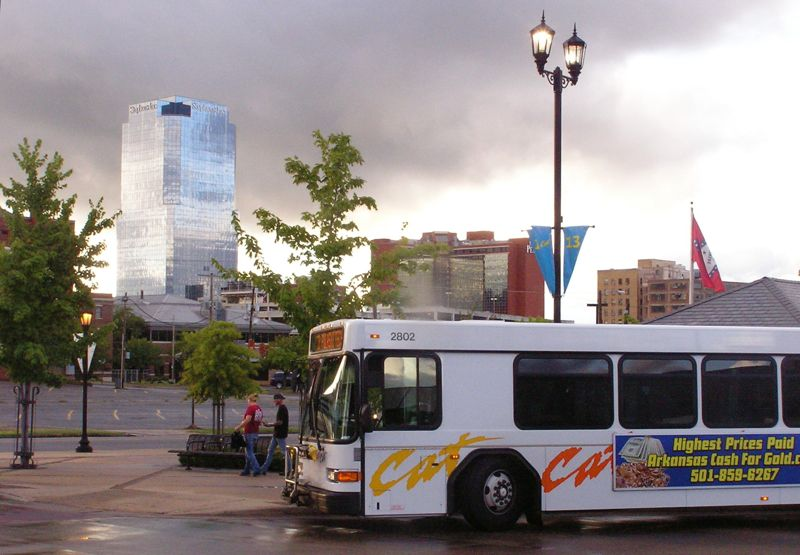
- Founded: 1986; 40 years ago
- Headquarters: 901 Maple Street, North Little Rock, Arkansas 72114
- Service area: Little Rock metropolitan area
- Service type: Bus, streetcar, paratransit, microtransit
- Routes: 15 (bus); 2 (streetcar)
- Stops: 1,600
- Hubs: River Cities Travel Center (Little Rock)
- Fleet: 61 buses, 5 streetcars
- Daily ridership: 6,900 (weekdays, Q2 2026)
- Annual ridership: 2,030,300 (2025)
- Fuel type: Diesel, Electric
- Website: rrmetro.org

Rock Region Metropolitan Transit Authority (also known as Rock Region Metro, stylized as Rock Region METRO), is the largest transit agency in Arkansas. It is based in Little Rock and provides public transportation services within Pulaski County, Arkansas, including buses, paratransit, and microtransit. Until 2015, it was known as the Central Arkansas Transit Authority.

Metro local operates 15 fixed bus routes and a demand response ADA paratransit service, known as LINKS which offers service to people that can't ride the Agency's fixed bus routes. A heritage streetcar system, known as the Metro Streetcar, operates 3.4 miles (5.5 km) of track throughout the downtown areas of Little Rock and North Little Rock. In 2025, the system had a ridership of 2,030,300, or about 6,900 per weekday as of the second quarter of 2026.

== History ==
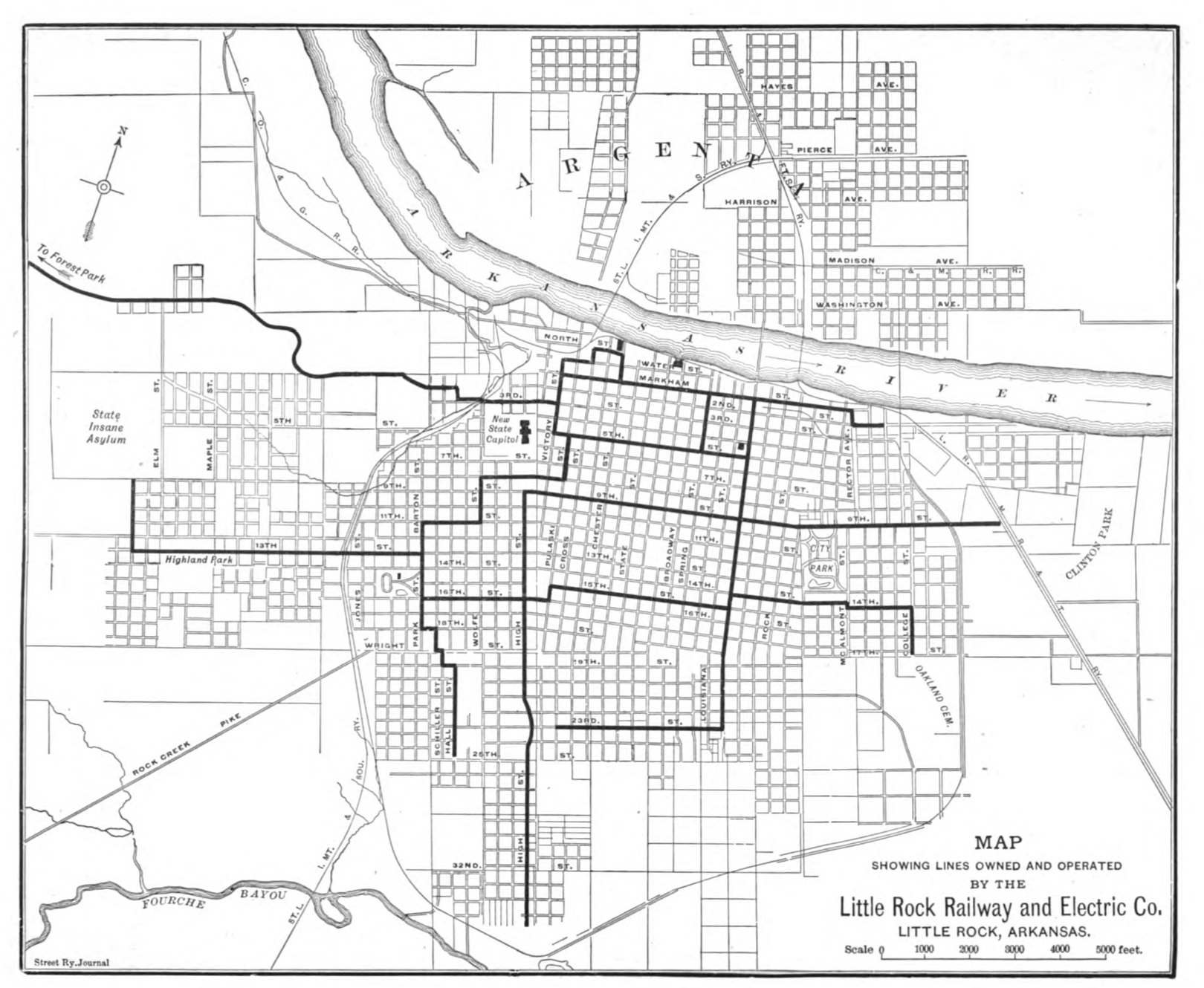
Map of Little Rock Railway and Electric Company c 1907

Little Rock's first transit system was owned and operated by private streetcar companies that were later consolidated into Arkansas Power & Light (AP&L), the predecessor to Entergy Arkansas. In 1950, AP&L sold the transit system, then known as Capital Transportation Company (CTC), to a group of local investors. A strike by the transit union, Amalgamated Transit Union Division 704, in 1955–1956 left the company with a damaged reputation and exacerbated existing financial problems.

The governments of Little Rock and North Little Rock awarded the franchise to a new company, Citizens' Coach Company (CCC), on February 28, 1956. Although the new company was backed by a group of local unions, the same financial problems that CTC encountered led to the demise of CCC by 1962. The declining passenger revenue and rising wages left few resources to maintain the bus fleet.

Following the takeover of the transit system by Twin City Transit (TCT) on September 25, 1962, the federal government began offering funds to struggling transit systems through various assistance programs. This funding assisted TCT with purchasing new buses, and TCT experienced some financial success. But the increase in passenger revenue was temporary, as TCT could not keep up with offering service in the expanding cities without continuing to receive fare increases. A 1971 study recommended that the transit system shift to public ownership under the direction of a regional authority.

Central Arkansas Transit commenced operations under the trusteeship of the metropolitan planning organization Metroplan on May 1, 1972. As a regional planning entity, Metroplan lacked the resources to supervise a transit operation indefinitely. Local government partners were being asked to infuse more money into the operation, and wanted more of a direct say than the 1972 agreement granted. On July 14, 1986, CATA was chartered when the government of Pulaski County and the city governments of Little Rock, North Little Rock, Cammack Village, Maumelle, Sherwood, and Jacksonville entered into an interlocal agreement that established CATA as a public corporation. (Cammack Village eventually ceased participation in CATA, eliminating funds beginning with its 2006 budget.)

On August 12, 2015, the Central Arkansas Transit Authority was officially rebranded as Rock Region Metro.

== Services ==
Metro operates 15 bus routes that serve 1,600 total bus stops.

=== Streetcars ===
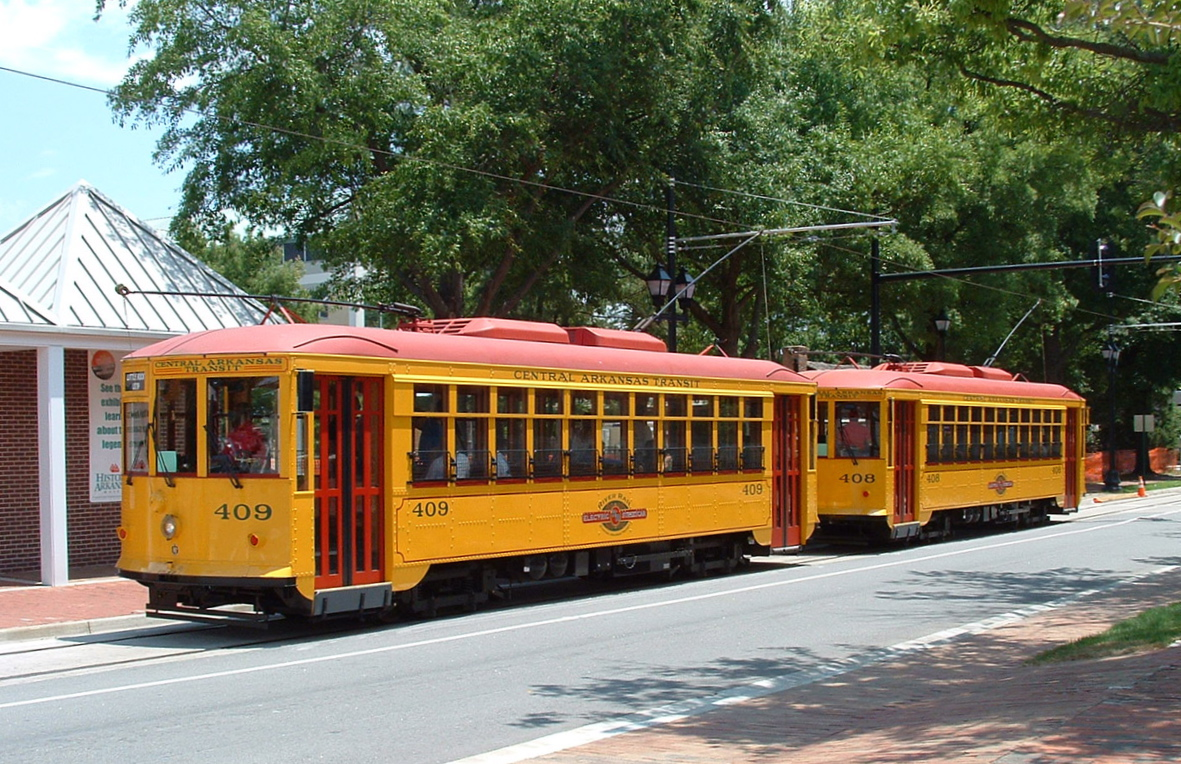
Two River Rail streetcars pause at the Historic Arkansas Museum stop in June 2005

Metro Streetcar began operation in November 2004, as the River Rail Streetcar. (It was given its current name in 2015.) Operating 3.4 miles (5.5 km) of track in Little Rock and across the Arkansas River in North Little Rock, the streetcar system caters to visitors, tourists, and local downtown residents. CATA conducted its River Rail Economic Enhancement Study in late 2012, noting resulting improvements in four areas: significant capital investment along the streetcar line, increased sales and property tax revenue, increased population of downtown neighborhood residents, and increased visitor volume and tourism for the streetcar and local attractions.

=== Microtransit ===
Rock Region METRO has six on-demand ride hailing zones operated by Via Transportation. The service started in 2020 with one test zone in John Barrow and has expanded to serve Little Rock, North Little Rock, Sherwood and Conway. It expanded service to Conway, Arkansas, on October 24, 2022, marking the city's first modern-day public transit service. In 2024 Metro connect also expanded to Sherwood, Arkansas.

== River Cities Travel Center ==
River Cities Travel Center (RCTC) opened on August 28, 2000, to serve as the main transfer hub in downtown Little Rock. The $4 million project encompassed the block bounded by Rock St., Capitol Ave., Cumberland St., and 4th St. In 2021, Rock Region Metro began to explore the possibility of expanding the facility to include transit oriented development. As of January 2016, a total of 22 fixed routes and all four express routes serve RCTC, which doubles as the agency's primary sales and information office for riders. At the Midtown Target stop in central Little Rock, five fixed routes (#3, #5, #8, #9, and #22) converge on Midtown Avenue to provide more convenient, efficient transferring opportunities in west-central Little Rock.

== Fleet ==
Rock Region Metro operates a fleet of 61 fixed route buses that are 35 to 40 feet (11 to 12 m) long. Most were manufactured by Gillig and are powered by either diesel or compressed natural gas; the use of compressed natural gas buses began in 2015 as part of a plan to replace all diesel buses. Five battery electric buses, the Proterra ZX5, made their debut in 2023 and were funded by a grant from the Federal Transit Administration. The Metro Links paratransit system has 26 vans that can carry 10 to 16 passengers; the Metro Connect microtransit system has 26 vehicles.

=== Rail ===
All cars are manufactured by Gomaco Trolley Company as their make & Replica Birney as their model.

Vehicle Numbers	Year	Notes
408	2002	
409-410	2003	
411-412	2006	

== Future ==
In 2015, Rock Region Metro adopted the MOVE Central Arkansas long-range transportation plan for the Little Rock metropolitan area. Future expansion recommendations include more frequent service, expanded coverage area, service to outlying areas, Sunday service on all routes, and more shelters at bus stops.

There are expansion studies for the Metro Streetcar to provide more service in North Little Rock and Little Rock. Recommendations include service to the Arkansas State Capitol, Clinton National Airport, and Main Street extensions in both downtown Little Rock and North Little Rock's Mid-City neighborhood.

== Fixed route ridership ==
The ridership statistics shown here are of fixed route services only and do not include demand response services.

== See also ==
- List of bus transit systems in the United States
- Little Rock Union Station
