= Argenta Branch Library =

- North Little Rock Post Office
- U.S. National Register of Historic Places
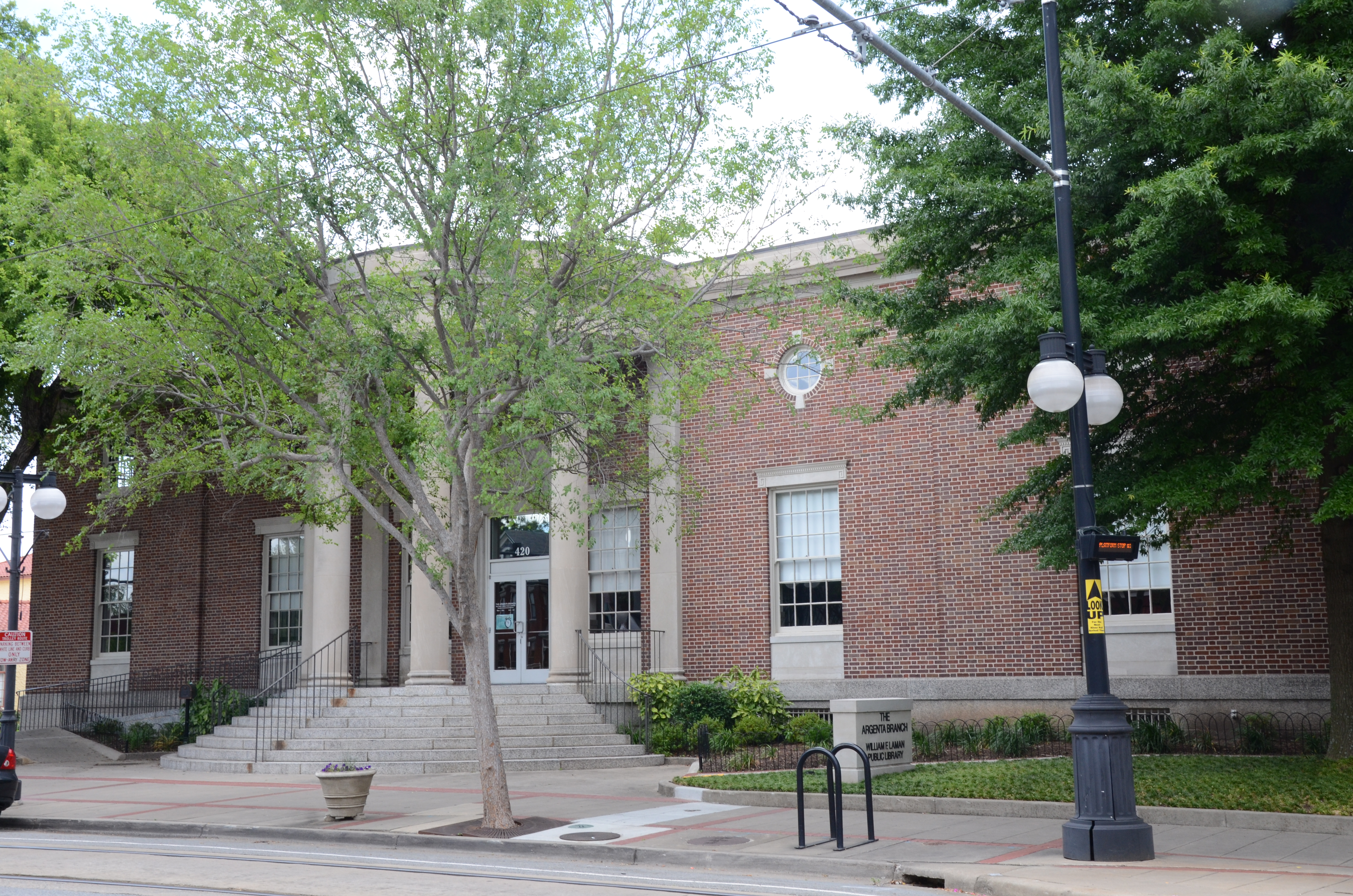

- Location within Arkansas Location within the United States
- Location: 420 N. Main St., North Little Rock, Arkansas
- Coordinates: 34°45′28″N 92°16′2″W
- Area: less than one acre
- Built: 1931
- Architect: Charles L. Thompson
- Architectural style: Classical Revival
- MPS: Thompson, Charles L., Design Collection TR
- NRHP reference No.: 82000915
- Added to NRHP: December 22, 1982

The Argenta Branch Library is a branch of the North Little Rock Public Library System in North Little Rock, Arkansas, United States. The building is a brick Georgian Revival constructed in 1931 to a design by Arkansas architect Charles L. Thompson. It was used as a post office until 2011, and was opened as a branch library in 2014.

The building was added to the National Register of Historic Places in 1982.
