= Gomaco Trolley Company =

American streetcar manufacturer

Coordinates: 42.348°N 95.464167°W

- Type: Division, Gomaco Corporation
- Industry: Transportation
- Founded: 1982
- Headquarters: Ida Grove, Iowa, United States
- Products: Streetcars
- Services: Streetcar restoration/rebuilding
- Website: www.gomacotrolley.com

The Gomaco Trolley Company is a manufacturer of vintage-style streetcars (alternatively called trolleys in the US, or trams in much of the world), located in Ida Grove, Iowa, United States. The company has supplied replica-vintage streetcars to several transit systems in the US, and has also restored and rebuilt authentic vintage streetcars for some systems.

== History ==
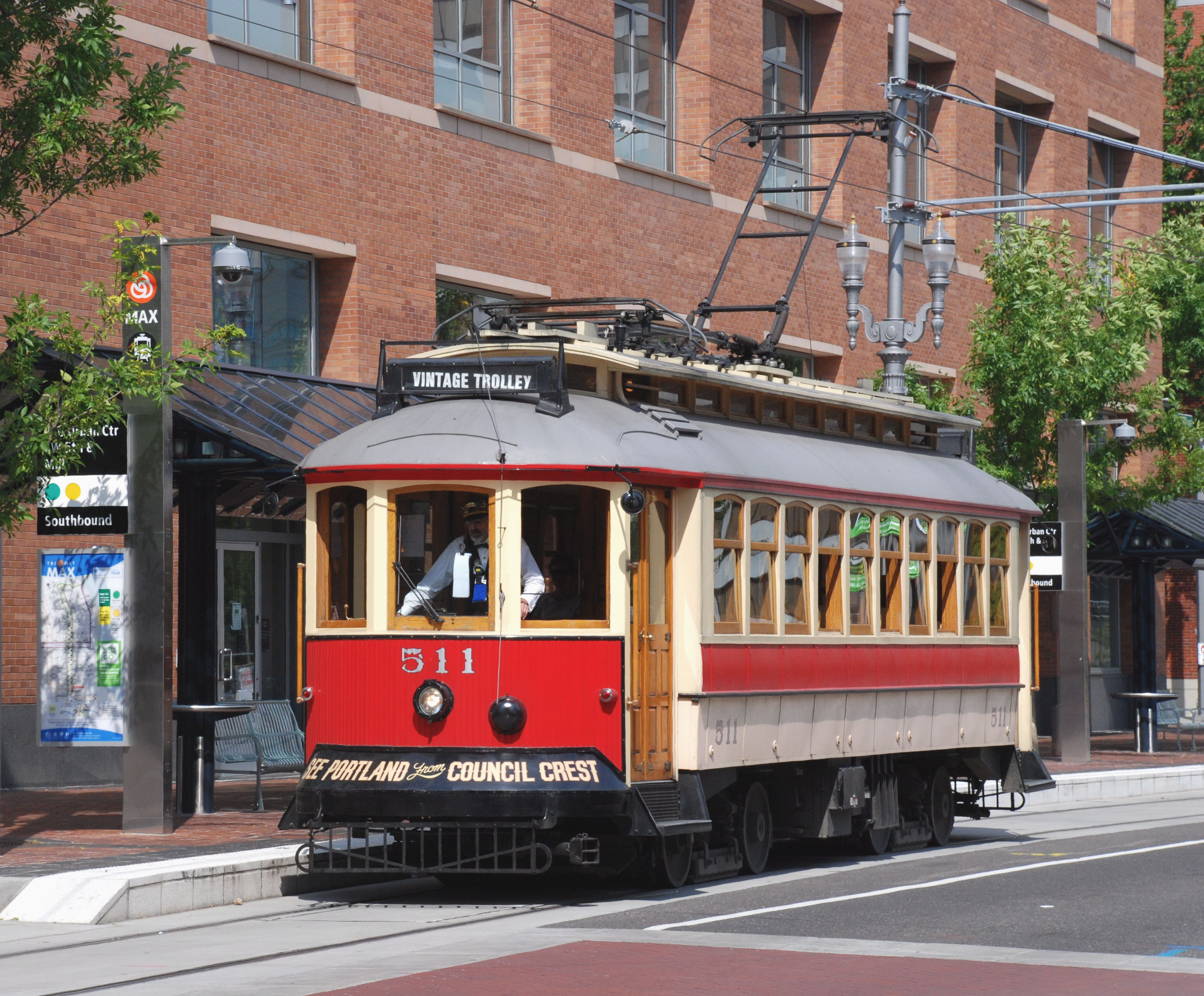
Gomaco-built Brill-type vintage-trolley replica on the Portland Vintage Trolley service, in downtown Portland, Oregon.

Established in 1982, Gomaco Trolley Company is a division of Gomaco Corporation, a major builder of equipment used in concrete paving. Founded in 1965 by Harold Godbersen, the parent company's name, "Gomaco", is a contraction of the words Godbersen Manufacturing Company.

Gomaco Corporation first branched out into the field of trolley manufacturing in 1982, when it was the successful bidder on a contract to supply two reproductions of "turn-of-the-century"-era trolleys/streetcars for operation on a new line due to be built at the Lowell National Historical Park, in Lowell, Massachusetts. The two cars (1601–2) were replicas of 15-bench, open-sided streetcars built in 1902 by the J. G. Brill Company for the Eastern Massachusetts Street Railway. The construction was all-new, except for their trucks, which Gomaco obtained from retired Melbourne, Australia streetcars and refurbished and adapted for use with the cars it was building for Lowell. These first two Gomaco streetcars were delivered in 1983/84. The Lowell streetcar line opened in May 1984, and was well-received, leading to the historical park's placing another order with Gomaco later, for one enclosed car of similar faux-vintage style, which was delivered in 1987 (car 4131).

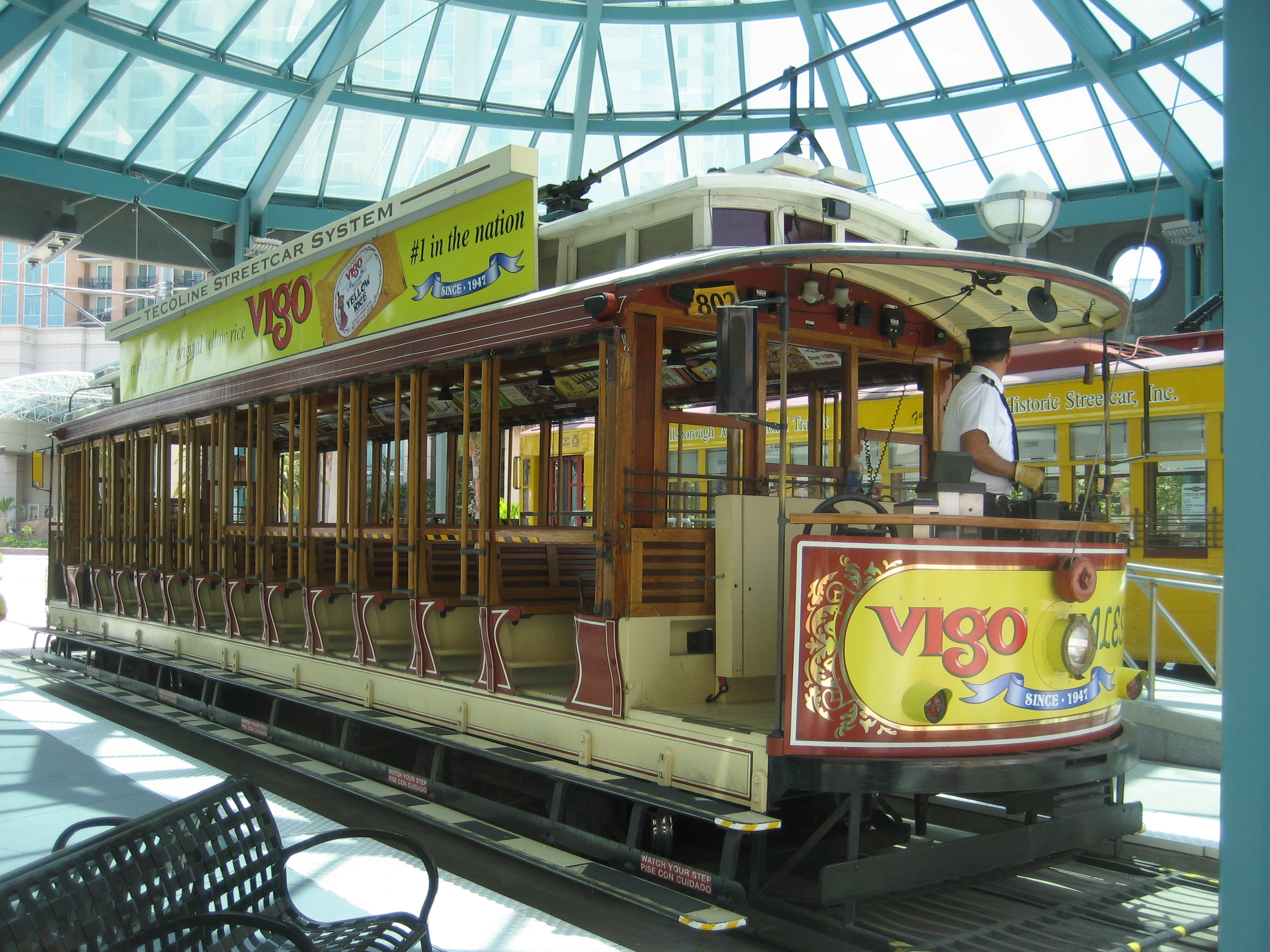
Gomaco-built 15-bench open car (No. 1976) on the TECO Line in Tampa, in 2008.

In the mid-1980s, Gomaco built two more 15-bench, open-style cars. Car 1976 was a conventional streetcar with a trolley pole on its roof, while car 1977 was fitted with an on-board generator, so that it could be operated on existing tracks, on a trial basis, without need for overhead trolley wires. The two cars were demonstrators which the company loaned to a few different operators. Ultimately, car 1977 was acquired by the Platte Valley Trolley, in Denver, Colorado, and—many years later—car 1976 by HART for the 2002-opened TECO Line Streetcar in Tampa, Florida.

== Gradual expansion, new designs ==
Subsequently, Gomaco Trolley Company has won contracts from other operators to build or rebuild vintage streetcars and, unlike with the Lowell line, Gomaco's later products have mostly been used by public transit agencies, for regular service along city streets. In 1991–92, the company provided four streetcars to TriMet, in Portland, Oregon, for use on the Portland Vintage Trolley service, which began operation in late 1991. Similar to the "Lowell enclosed" model, these were replicas of 1904 Brill-built, double-truck cars, patterned on streetcars that had been operated locally, in Portland. However, in this instance the replicas would be sharing the tracks with modern light rail cars of TriMet's MAX system, so while Gomaco based the new bodies on the 1904 cars, the trucks were a younger style (1940s/'50s) which the company assembled from parts it acquired from Boston streetcars and Chicago rapid-transit cars. The four Portland cars (511–514) also were equipped with modern features such as Automatic Train Stop.

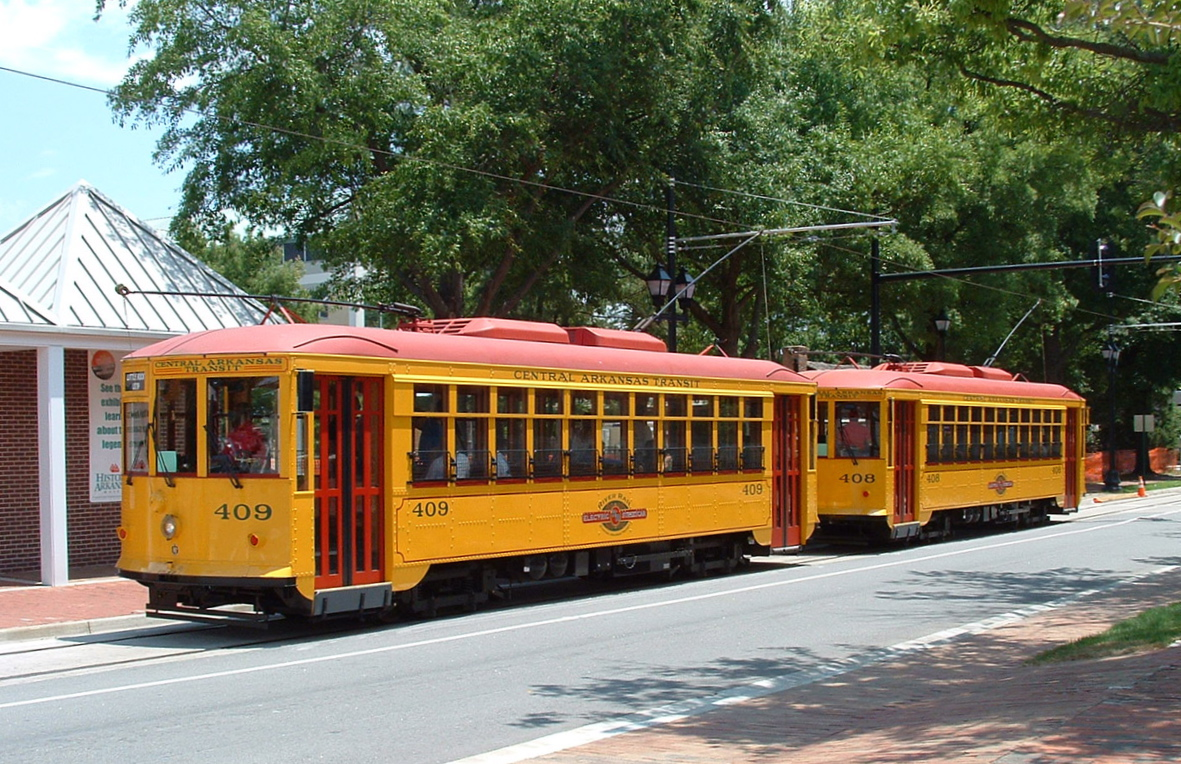
Gomaco-built replica double-truck Birney cars on the River Rail Streetcar in Little Rock.

During the mid- and late 1990s, Gomaco restored and rebuilt several ex-Melbourne W2-type streetcars for Memphis' Main Street Trolley and also sold to the Memphis Area Transit Authority a single-truck car it had built all-new in 1993 as a demonstrator.

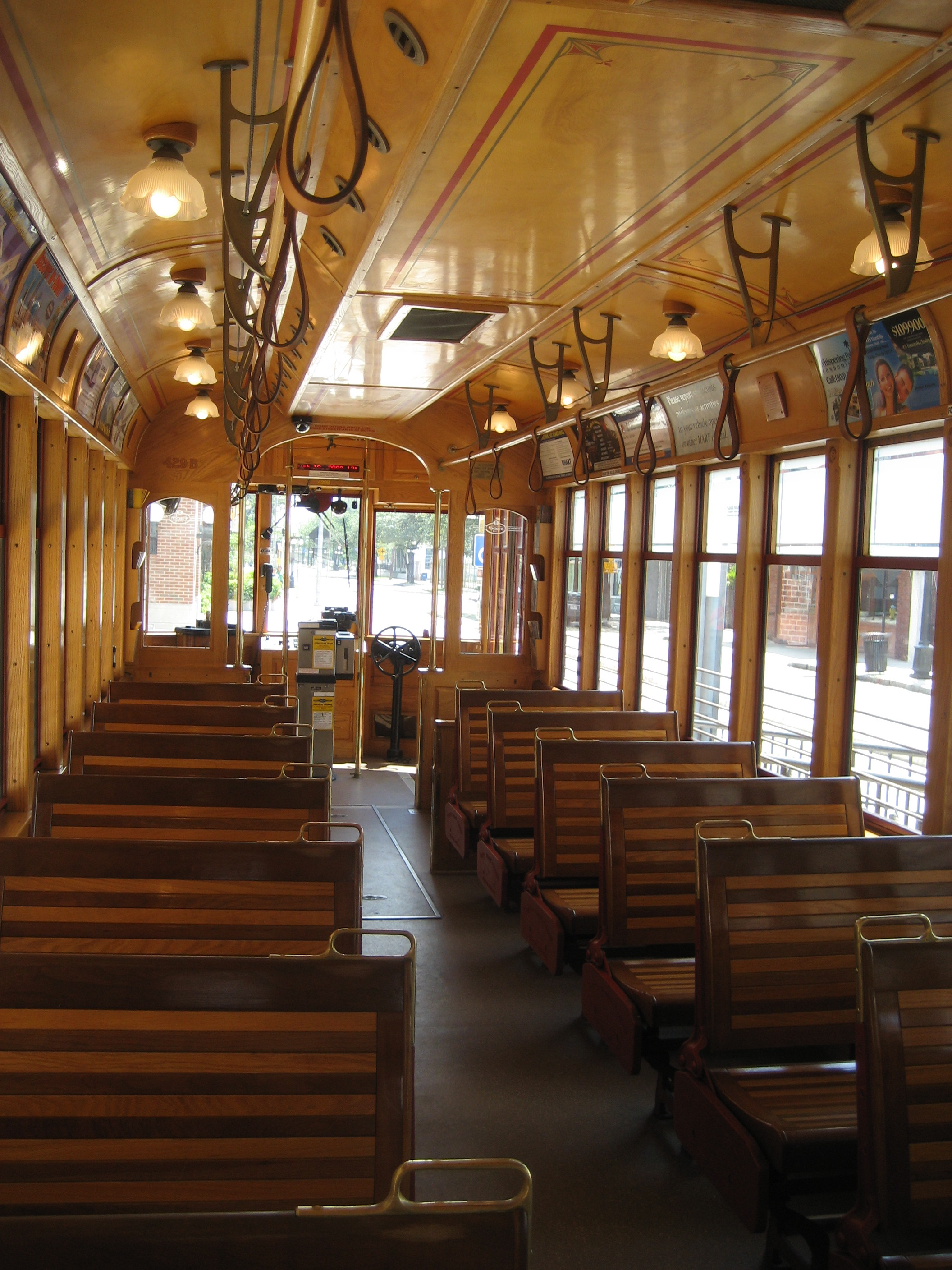
Interior of a Tampa replica Birney, built in 2000. The seat backs are reversible.

In more recent years, the company has supplied new replica Birney streetcars to the TECO Line Streetcar, in Tampa; to the River Rail Streetcar, in Little Rock, Arkansas; and to the Charlotte Area Transit System, in Charlotte, North Carolina, for use on the Charlotte Trolley. These cars used trucks taken from 1920s-vintage Peter Witt-type streetcars which Gomaco acquired from Milan, Italy, and refurbished.

Gomaco Trolley added a new model in 2002, with the introduction of the "reconditioned Peter Witt", which is the refurbishing of a complete Peter Witt streetcar, rather than only using its trucks. A large number of Peter Witt streetcars remain in regular service in Milan in 2009, but the operator of Milan's tramway network, ATM, has retired some in recent years, and Gomaco purchased a number of these cars from ATM, for possible reconditioning for customers in North America.

The company also takes orders from customers who only want a replica trolley body, not a complete and functioning car. In 2006, it built a replica of half of a Peter Witt trolley car for decorative use as a cover to the entrance to an underground trolley station (of SEPTA) at the University of Pennsylvania campus in Philadelphia, the 37th Street station. It was patterned exactly after the particular style of Peter Witt car that served Philadelphia—in large numbers—starting in the mid-1920s. The replica was a gift to the school from its Class of 1956.

Gomaco has also built at least one battery-powered streetcar. In 2008, it delivered two open cars to Glendale, California's Americana at Brand shopping development: one a 33-foot-long battery-powered car and the other a 22-foot-long unpowered passenger car (trailer). The powered car is equipped with a wheelchair lift.

In 2012, the Issaquah Valley Trolley (in Issaquah, Washington) hired Gomaco to restore and modify ex-Lisbon streetcar No. 519, which was built by Brill and assembled in Lisbon in 1925. The work included re-gauging of the car's truck to standard gauge from the original 900 mm gauge.

In 2015–2017, Gomaco overhauled and rebuilt three streetcars for the Loop Trolley, a new streetcar system under construction in St. Louis, Missouri. The work included adding wheelchair lifts.

== See also ==
- Heritage streetcar
- List of tram builders
- Streetcars in North America
