= North Little Rock City Hall =

- U.S. National Register of Historic Places
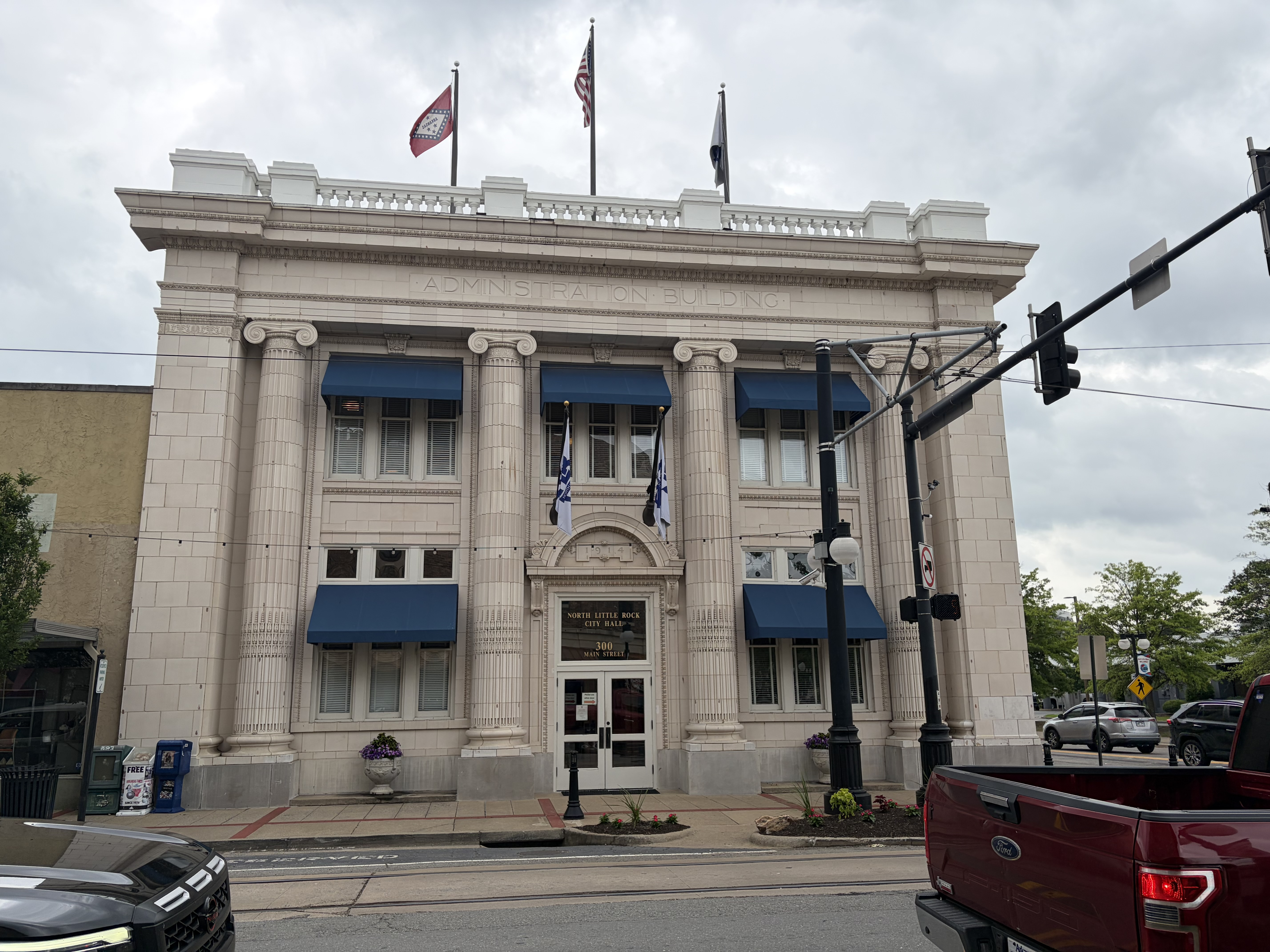
- City Hall in 2026

- Location within Arkansas Location within the United States
- Location: 3rd and Main Sts., North Little Rock, Arkansas
- Coordinates: 34°45′22″N 92°16′2″W
- Area: less than one acre
- Built: 1914
- Architect: John L. Howard, Schmlezer & Schay
- Architectural style: Classical Revival
- NRHP reference No.: 75000414
- Added to NRHP: August 6, 1975

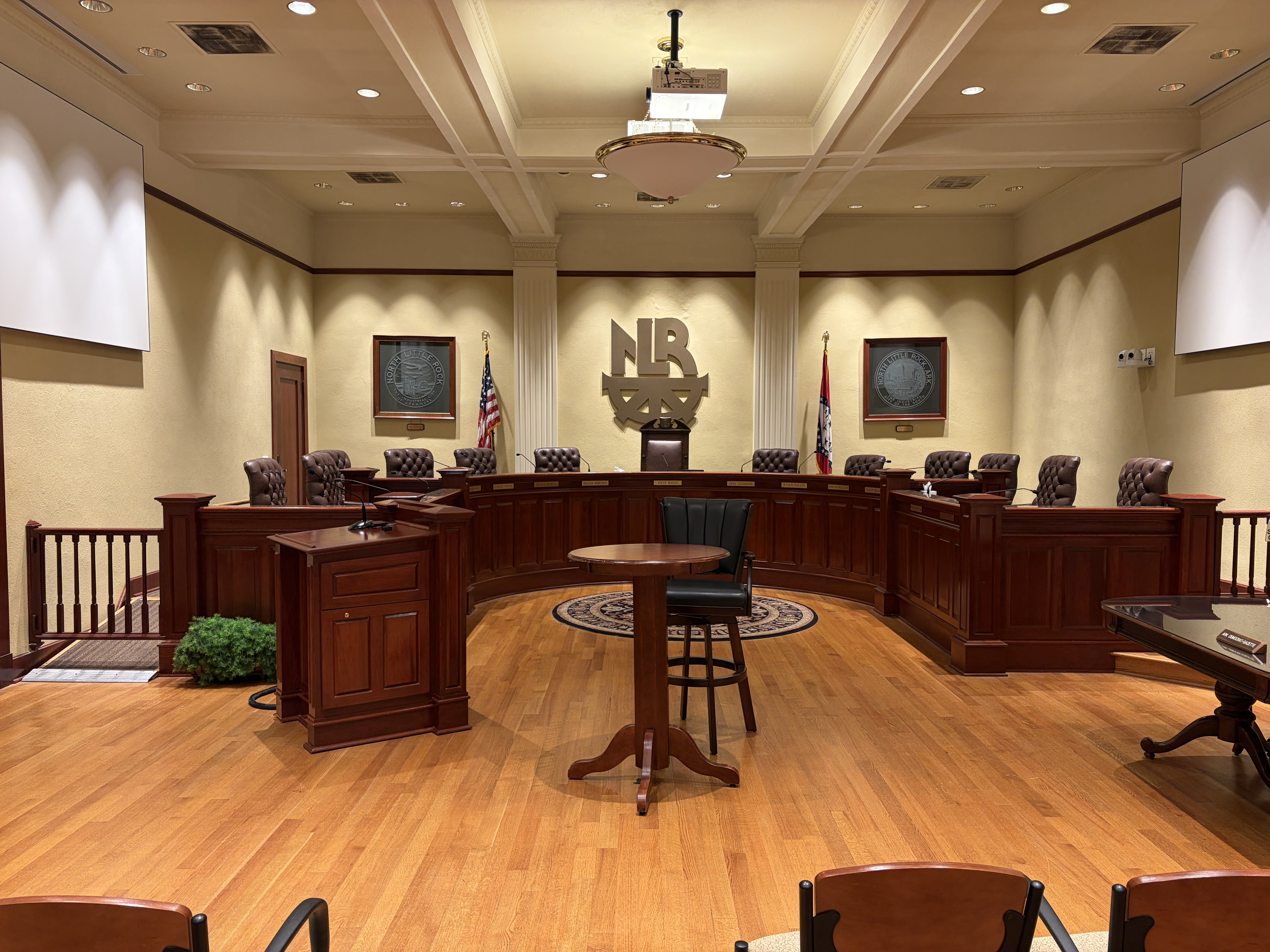
The council chambers in city hall

North Little Rock City Hall is located at 300 Main Street in North Little Rock, Arkansas. It is a Classical Revival two-story building, with an exterior of stone with terra cotta trim. Prominent features of its street-facing facades (on Main and 3rd Streets) are massive engaged two-story fluted Ionic columns. It was built in 1914–15, and is based on the design of a bank building seen by Mayor J.P. Faucette in St. Louis, Missouri.

The building was listed on the National Register of Historic Places in 1975. It is located in the city’s Argenta Historic District.

== See also ==
- List of mayors of North Little Rock, Arkansas
- National Register of Historic Places listings in Pulaski County, Arkansas
