= Argenta Historic District =

Historic district in Arkansas, United States

- U.S. National Register of Historic Places
- U.S. Historic district
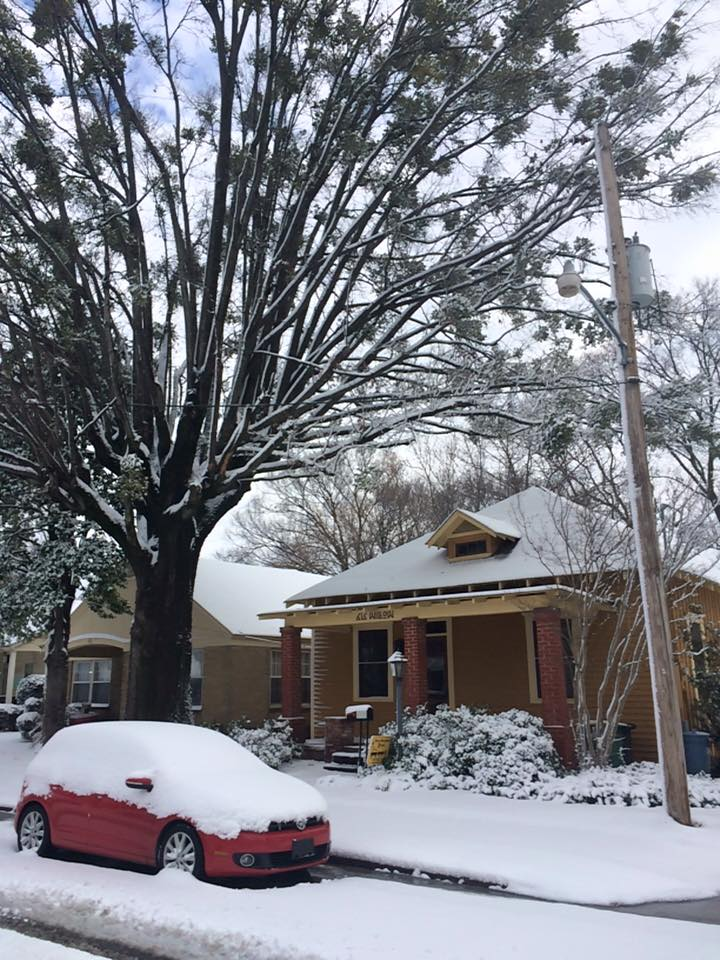

- Location within Arkansas Location within the United States
- Location: Roughly, Melrose Cir. and Willow St. S to W. 4th St., and Main St. from W. 6th St. to W. 3rd St. (original); 616 Orange St., 116 W. 7th St., 206 W. 7th St., 212 W. 7th St., 220 W. 7th St., 616 Maple St., and 620 Maple St. (first increase); Roughly bounded by N. Poplar, 9th St., N. Broadway, W. 4th, and Broadway (second increase); North Little Rock, Arkansas.
- Coordinates: 34°45′32″N 92°16′11″W
- Area: 33 acres (13 ha)
- Architect: Charles L. Thompson, H. Ray Burks
- Architectural style: Colonial Revival, Bungalow/Craftsman, Commercial Style, Italianate, Queen Anne
- NRHP reference No.: 93000094 (original); 02000076 (increase 1); 06001217 (increase 2)

Significant dates
- Added to NRHP: March 15, 1993
- Boundary increases: February 22, 2002; March 8, 2007

The Argenta Historic District encompasses significant historic elements of central North Little Rock, Arkansas. The area that is now central North Little Rock was known as Argenta when it was first settled, and remained unincorporated until it was annexed to Little Rock in 1890. William Faucette, a leading Argenta politician and businessman, orchestrated the incorporation of North Little Rock just beyond the annexed area in 1901, and then made a successful petition to separate Argenta from Little Rock into the new municipality in 1903. Subsequent attempts to rename North Little Rock to Argenta have failed.

The district consists of two discontinuous areas, one commercial and the other residential. The commercial section consists of a three-block stretch of Main Street, between Broadway Street and 6th Street. Three blocks west of this area is the residential area, which is centered on a stretch of Willow Street from 4th to Melrose Circle, that also includes properties on adjoining blocks of cross streets in between. The district was first listed on the National Register of Historic Places in 1993. In 2002 it was amended to change the status of five buildings to contributing status, as they had undergone appropriate historic restoration work.

The commercial section of the district was primarily developed between 1900 and 1940, and includes 18 historically significant buildings, including six that are separately listed on the National Register: North Little Rock City Hall, the former North Little Rock Post Office (now the Argenta Branch Library), the Faucette Building, and the Old Central Fire Station are among them. The residential section includes 177 buildings in total, of which 77 were initially deemed historically significant, including the separately-listed Baker House and Barth-Hempfling House. Many of the non-contributing properties are of an appropriate age, and were only excluded because of the application of inappropriate exterior siding materials and other reversible or restorable alterations. The majority of residential buildings are Craftsman in style, although there are large numbers of vernacular versions of the Colonial Revival present as well.

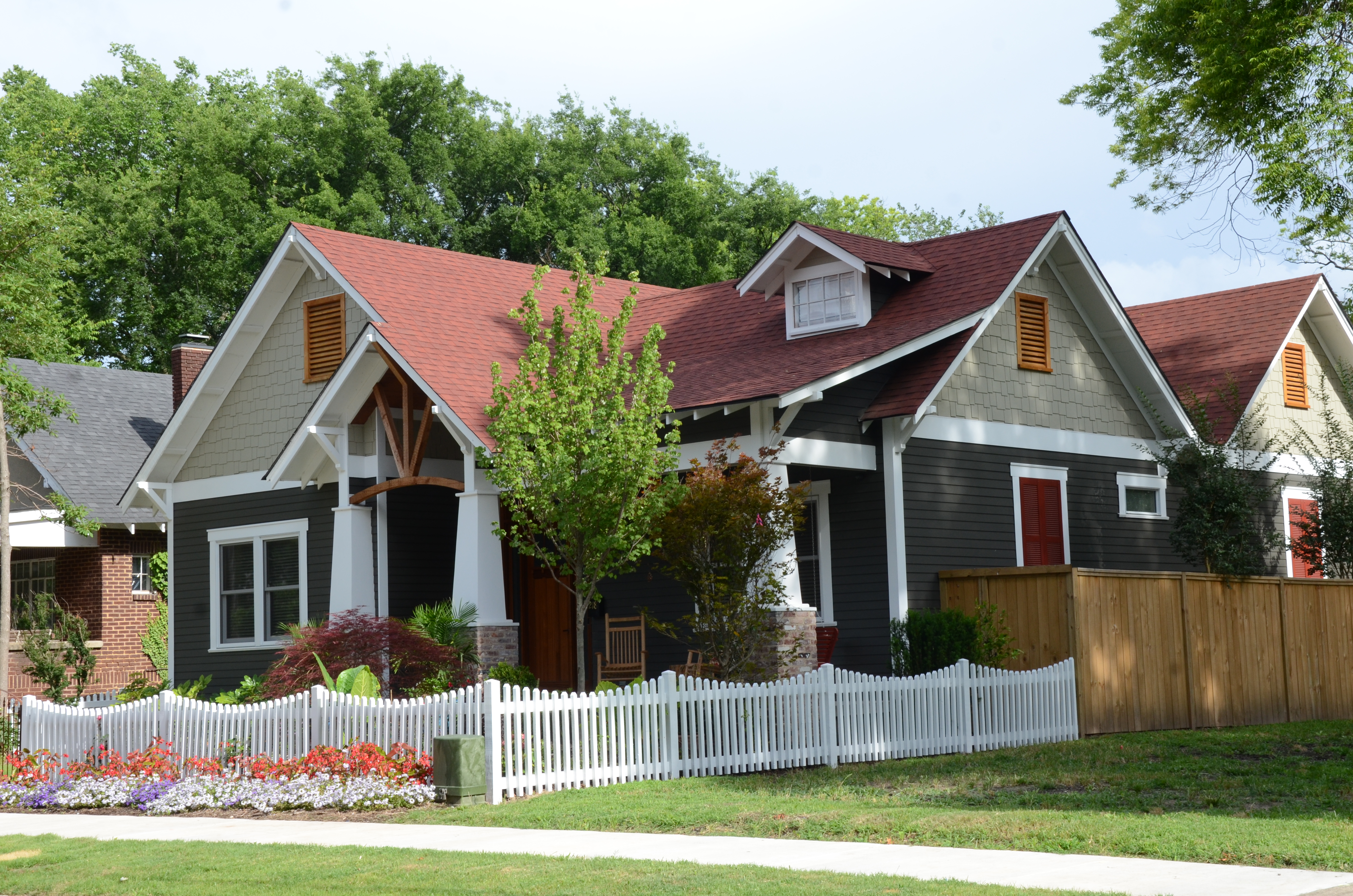
A House in the Argenta Historic District

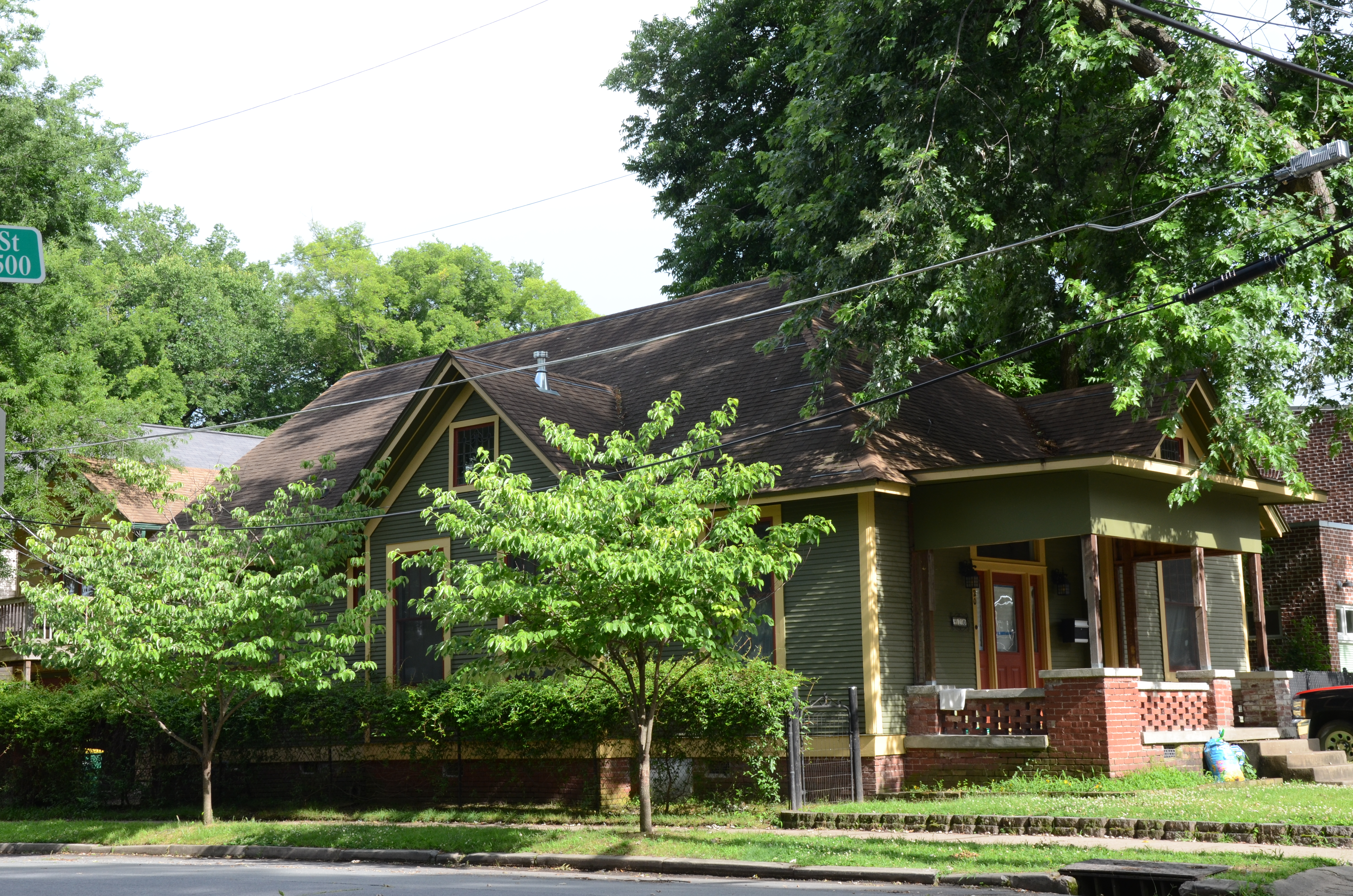
A House in the Argenta Historic District

== See also ==
- National Register of Historic Places listings in Pulaski County, Arkansas
