= North Little Rock, Arkansas =

City in Arkansas, USA

- City
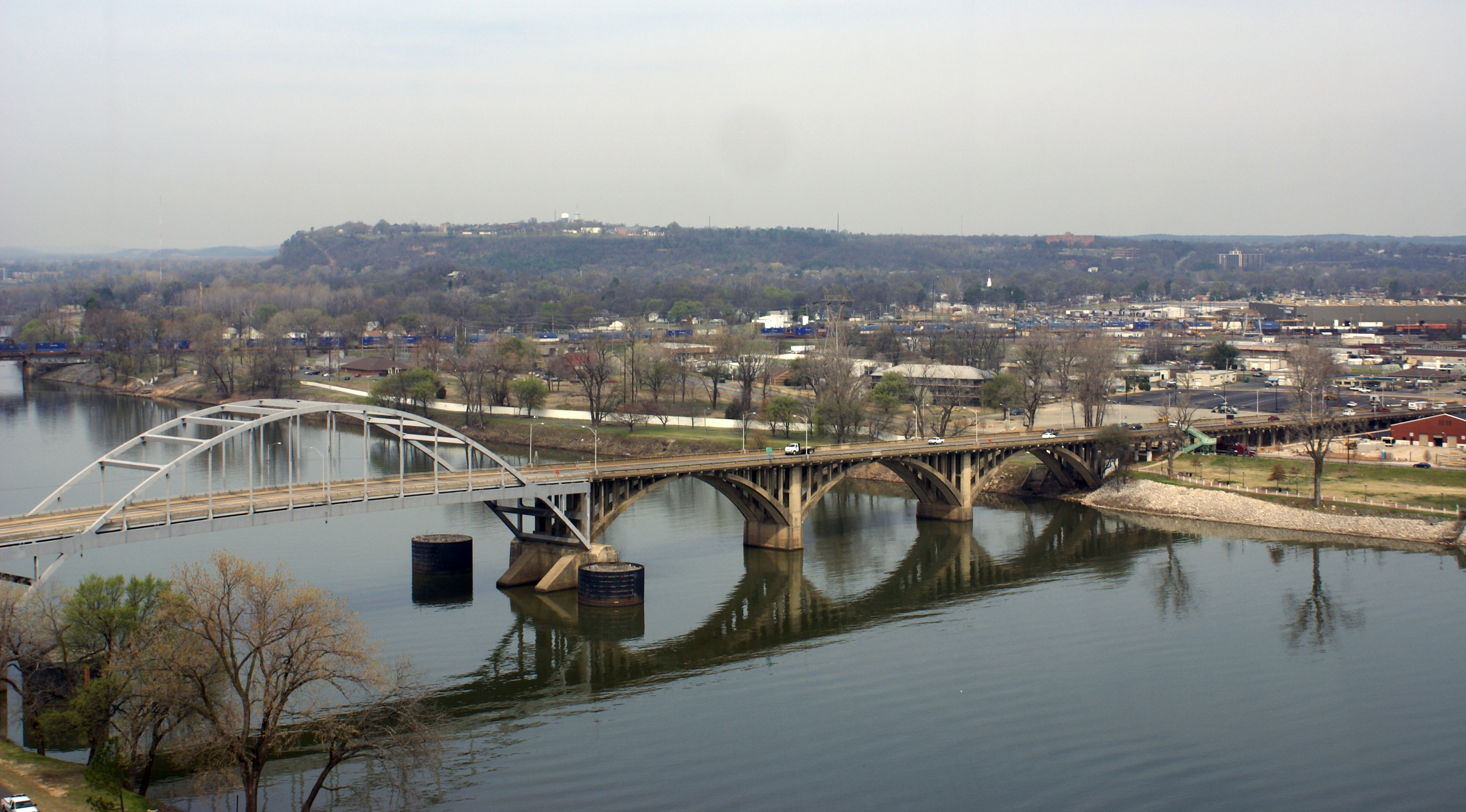
- North Little Rock from across the Arkansas River

- Flag Logo
- Motto: “Up for Something!”
- Interactive map of North Little Rock, Arkansas
- Location in the Arkansas
- Coordinates: 34°46′51″N 92°15′25″W
- Country: United States
- State: Arkansas
- County: Pulaski
- Township: Hill
- Founded: April 18, 1871
- Incorporated: July 17, 1901
- Named for: Little Rock, Arkansas

Government
  - Type: Mayor–Council
  - Mayor: Terry Hartwick
  - Council: North Little Rock City Council

Area
  - City: 56.20 sq mi (145.55 km^{2})
  - Land: 53.04 sq mi (137.38 km^{2})
  - Water: 3.15 sq mi (8.16 km^{2})
- Elevation: 256 ft (78 m)

Population (2020)
  - City: 64,591
  - Estimate (2025): 65,120 ▲
  - Rank: US: 524th
  - Density: 1,217.7/sq mi (470.15/km^{2})
  - Urban: 431,388 (US: 88th)
  - Metro: 729,135 (US: 75th)
- Time zone: UTC−6 (CST)
  - Summer (DST): UTC−5 (CDT)
- ZIP codes: 72114-119, 721124, 72190, 72199
- Area code: 501
- FIPS code: 05-50450
- GNIS feature ID: 2404393
- Website: nlr.ar.gov

North Little Rock (often abbreviated "NLR") is a city in Pulaski County, Arkansas, United States. Located on the north side of the Arkansas River, it is the twin city of Little Rock. In the late 19th century, it was annexed by Little Rock for a period, but regained its independence in the early 20th century. The population was 64,591 at the 2020 census, making it the seventh-most populous city in Arkansas.

The city has invested in significant beautification efforts since the late 20th century. Young families and professionals have shown new interest in this area. The Argenta Historic District in Downtown is one of a number of areas that have developed as thriving entertainment districts offering theaters, fine dining, bars, gastropubs, and boutiques.

It is also home to Dickey-Stephens Park, which hosts the Arkansas Travelers minor league baseball team. Simmons Bank Arena is the metropolitan area's main entertainment venue. Farther west is Burns Park, one of the largest municipal parks in the United States.

== History ==
Originally named Argenta, Arkansas, the community was founded on April 18, 1871. In 1890, the city of Little Rock annexed Argenta as part of its eighth ward, preempting a competing petition to incorporate.

As part of a plan to reclaim its independence, Argenta was incorporated on July 17, 1901, as the town of "North Little Rock". By 1904, the state's supreme court allowed North Little Rock to annex what was left of the ward. It readopted the name Argenta in 1906, only to revert to North Little Rock in October 1917. Evidence of the old town can still be found in the North Little Rock City Hall (built in 1914) which contains plaques referring to Argenta, and incorporates "C of A" (i.e. City of Argenta) ornamental features.

== Geography ==
According to the United States Census Bureau, the city has a total area of 47.0 square miles (122 km^{2}), of which 44.8 square miles (116 km^{2}) is land and 2.2 square miles (5.7 km^{2}) (4.58%) is water.

=== Neighborhoods ===
- Amboy
- Argenta Historic District
- Arrowhead Manor
- Baring Cross
- Chimney Rock
- Crystal Hill
- Dark Hollow
- Dixie
- Indian Hills
- Lakewood
- Levy
- Mid-City
- Overbrook
- Park Hill (Contains the Park Hill Historic District)
- Pike View
- Rose City
- Windsor Valley

=== Climate ===
The climate in this area is characterized by hot, humid summers and generally mild to cool winters. According to the Köppen Climate Classification system, North Little Rock has a humid subtropical climate, abbreviated "Cfa" on climate maps.

North Little Rock has a humid subtropical climate with long, hot, and sunny summers and mild, wet winters with little snow. January on average is the coldest month, while July is typically the warmest, though occasionally August can claim the distinction. The overall yearly average temperature is 62.5 degrees. Precipitation averages 45.79 inches a year, with winter and spring tending to be wetter than summer and autumn. Severe thunderstorms can occur, especially during the spring.

Climate data for Little Rock (Clinton National Airport), 1991−2020 normals, (Note: Mean monthly maxima and minima (i.e. the expected highest and lowest temperature readings at any point during the year or given month) calculated based on data at said location from 1991 to 2020.) extremes 1879−present (Note: Official records for Little Rock began on 1 July 1879 at the State Capitol and maintained there until 30 April 1942. The next day, and until 7 August 1942, temperature and precipitation were recorded separately at two different locations in and around Little Rock, and the official climatology station has been Adams Field since 8 August 1942. For more information, see Threadex)
Month	Jan	Feb	Mar	Apr	May	Jun	Jul	Aug	Sep	Oct	Nov	Dec	Year
Record high °F (°C)	83 (28)	87 (31)	91 (33)	95 (35)	98 (37)	107 (42)	112 (44)	114 (46)	106 (41)	98 (37)	86 (30)	81 (27)	114 (46)
Mean maximum °F (°C)	72.0 (22.2)	75.8 (24.3)	82.2 (27.9)	86.2 (30.1)	91.3 (32.9)	96.2 (35.7)	100.2 (37.9)	101.1 (38.4)	96.2 (35.7)	89.2 (31.8)	79.6 (26.4)	72.8 (22.7)	102.4 (39.1)
Mean daily maximum °F (°C)	50.5 (10.3)	55.2 (12.9)	63.7 (17.6)	72.8 (22.7)	80.5 (26.9)	88.2 (31.2)	91.7 (33.2)	91.5 (33.1)	85.1 (29.5)	74.2 (23.4)	61.9 (16.6)	52.6 (11.4)	72.3 (22.4)
Daily mean °F (°C)	40.7 (4.8)	44.7 (7.1)	52.7 (11.5)	61.4 (16.3)	69.9 (21.1)	78.0 (25.6)	81.4 (27.4)	80.8 (27.1)	74.0 (23.3)	62.6 (17.0)	51.1 (10.6)	43.0 (6.1)	61.7 (16.5)
Mean daily minimum °F (°C)	30.9 (−0.6)	34.2 (1.2)	41.8 (5.4)	50.1 (10.1)	59.3 (15.2)	67.7 (19.8)	71.2 (21.8)	70.1 (21.2)	62.9 (17.2)	50.9 (10.5)	40.2 (4.6)	33.3 (0.7)	51.0 (10.6)
Mean minimum °F (°C)	16.4 (−8.7)	20.5 (−6.4)	26.6 (−3.0)	36.9 (2.7)	47.2 (8.4)	59.8 (15.4)	65.6 (18.7)	63.8 (17.7)	50.4 (10.2)	37.1 (2.8)	26.4 (−3.1)	20.3 (−6.5)	13.6 (−10.2)
Record low °F (°C)	−8 (−22)	−12 (−24)	11 (−12)	28 (−2)	38 (3)	46 (8)	54 (12)	52 (11)	37 (3)	27 (−3)	10 (−12)	−1 (−18)	−12 (−24)
Average precipitation inches (mm)	3.50 (89)	3.97 (101)	4.96 (126)	5.59 (142)	5.08 (129)	3.55 (90)	3.33 (85)	3.16 (80)	3.01 (76)	4.47 (114)	4.72 (120)	5.08 (129)	50.42 (1,281)
Average snowfall inches (cm)	1.1 (2.8)	1.6 (4.1)	0.5 (1.3)	0.0 (0.0)	0.0 (0.0)	0.0 (0.0)	0.0 (0.0)	0.0 (0.0)	0.0 (0.0)	0.0 (0.0)	0.0 (0.0)	0.6 (1.5)	3.8 (9.7)
Average extreme snow depth inches (cm)	1 (2.5)	1 (2.5)	0 (0)	0 (0)	0 (0)	0 (0)	0 (0)	0 (0)	0 (0)	0 (0)	0 (0)	1 (2.5)	1 (2.5)
Average precipitation days (≥ 0.01 in)	9.2	9.3	10.5	9.4	10.9	8.0	8.7	7.2	6.6	8.1	8.5	9.5	105.9
Average snowy days (≥ 0.1 in)	0.5	0.9	0.4	0.0	0.0	0.0	0.0	0.0	0.0	0.0	0.1	0.3	2.2
Average relative humidity (%)	70.2	68.3	65.4	66.7	71.1	70.0	71.6	71.7	73.5	70.4	71.0	70.9	70.1
Average dew point °F (°C)	28.9 (−1.7)	32.4 (0.2)	40.3 (4.6)	49.6 (9.8)	59.2 (15.1)	66.2 (19.0)	70.2 (21.2)	68.5 (20.3)	63.1 (17.3)	51.1 (10.6)	41.7 (5.4)	32.7 (0.4)	50.3 (10.2)
Mean monthly sunshine hours	180.9	188.2	244.5	276.7	325.3	346.2	351.0	323.0	271.9	251.0	176.9	166.2	3,101.8
Percentage possible sunshine	58	62	66	71	75	80	80	78	73	72	57	54	70
Average ultraviolet index	2.5	3.8	5.7	7.6	8.9	9.6	9.8	8.9	7.2	4.9	3.0	2.3	6.1
Source 1: NOAA (relative humidity and dew point 1961-1990, sun 1961−1990 at North Little Rock Airport)
Source 2: UV Index Today (1995 to 2022)

== Demographics ==
Historical population
Census	Pop.	Note	%±
1910	11,138		—
1920	14,048		26.1%
1930	19,418		38.2%
1940	21,137		8.9%
1950	44,097		108.6%
1960	58,032		31.6%
1970	60,040		3.5%
1980	64,388		7.2%
1990	61,741		−4.1%
2000	60,433		−2.1%
2010	62,304		3.1%
2020	64,591		3.7%
2025 (est.)	65,120	▲	0.8%
U.S. Decennial Census

=== Racial and ethnic composition ===
North Little Rock city, Arkansas – Racial and ethnic composition Note: the US Census treats Hispanic/Latino as an ethnic category. This table excludes Latinos from the racial categories and assigns them to a separate category. Hispanics/Latinos may be of any race.
Race / Ethnicity (NH = Non-Hispanic)	Pop. 2000	Pop. 2010	Pop. 2020	% 2000	% 2010	% 2020
White alone (NH)	37,186	32,126	28,430	61.53%	51.56%	44.02%
Black or African American alone (NH)	20,483	24,648	27,465	33.89%	39.56%	42.52%
Native American or Alaska Native alone (NH)	227	209	222	0.38%	0.34%	0.34%
Asian alone (NH)	345	571	726	0.57%	0.92%	1.12%
Native Hawaiian or Pacific Islander alone (NH)	18	37	30	0.03%	0.06%	0.05%
Other race alone (NH)	40	70	215	0.07%	0.11%	0.33%
Mixed race or Multiracial (NH)	671	1,086	2,911	1.11%	1.74%	4.51%
Hispanic or Latino (any race)	1,463	3,557	4,592	2.42%	5.71%	7.11%
Total	60,433	62,304	64,591	100.00%	100.00%	100.00%

=== 2020 census ===
As of the 2020 census, North Little Rock had a population of 64,591 with 28,967 households and 14,720 families. The population density was 1,234.2 people per square mile.

The median age was 37.6 years; 23.0% of residents were under 18 (including 6.9% under age 5), and 16.1% were 65 or older. For every 100 females there were 89.9 males, and for every 100 females age 18 and over there were 85.9 males age 18 and over.

About 95.4% of residents lived in urban areas and 4.6% lived in rural areas.

Of the city's households, 27.2% had children under the age of 18 living in them. Of all households, 30.5% were married-couple households, 23.6% were households with a male householder and no spouse or partner present, and 39.3% were households with a female householder and no spouse or partner present. About 38.9% of all households were made up of individuals and 12.0% had someone living alone who was 65 years of age or older.

There were 32,856 housing units, of which 11.8% were vacant. The homeowner vacancy rate was 2.2% and the rental vacancy rate was 10.8%.

Racial composition as of the 2020 census
Race	Number	Percent
White	29,294	45.4%
Black or African American	27,634	42.8%
American Indian and Alaska Native	347	0.5%
Asian	753	1.2%
Native Hawaiian and Other Pacific Islander	32	0.0%
Some other race	2,581	4.0%
Two or more races	3,950	6.1%

=== 2010 census ===
As of the census of 2010, there were 62,304 people, 25,542 households, and 16,117 families residing in the city. The population density was 1,348.6 inhabitants per square mile (520.7/km^{2}). There were 27,567 housing units at an average density of 615.2 per square mile (237.5/km^{2}). The city was 54.02% White, 39.73% Black or African American, 0.41% Native American, 0.94% Asian, 0.07% Pacific Islander, 2.71% from other races, and 2.14% from two or more races. 5.71% of the population were Hispanic or Latino of any race.

There were 25,542 households, out of which 28.9% had children under the age of 18 living with them, 41.9% were married couples living together, 17.6% had a female householder with no husband present, and 36.9% were non-families. 32.0% of all households were made up of individuals, and 12.2% had someone living alone who was 65 years of age or older. The average household size was 2.35 and the average family size was 2.97.

In the city, the population was spread out, with 25.5% under the age of 18, 9.0% from 18 to 24, 28.4% from 25 to 44, 22.5% from 45 to 64, and 14.6% who were 65 years of age or older. The median age was 36 years. For every 100 females, there were 87.7 males. For every 100 females age 18 and over, there were 82.9 males.

The median income for a household in the city was $35,578, and the median income for a family was $43,595. Males had a median income of $31,420 versus $24,987 for females. The per capita income for the city was $19,662. About 12.4% of families and 16.1% of the population were below the poverty line, including 26.5% of those under age 18 and 11.7% of those age 65 or over.

== Arts and culture ==
=== Points of interest ===
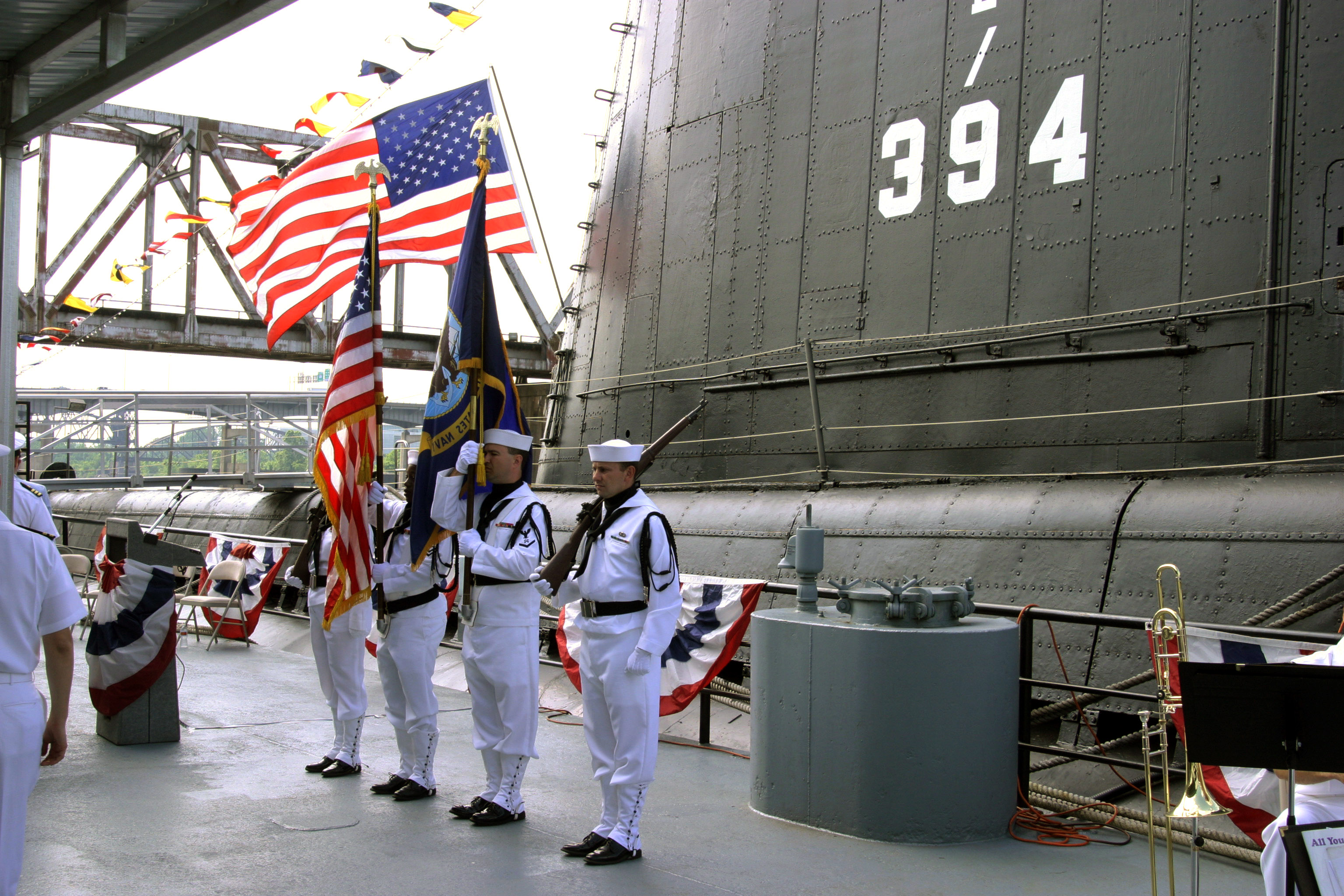
United States Navy color guard at the Arkansas Inland Maritime Museum

- Argenta Historic District
- Argenta Plaza
- Arkansas National Guard Museum
- Burns Park
- Simmons Bank Arena with the Arkansas Sports Hall of Fame Museum
- McCain Mall
- Lakewood Village
- Arkansas Inland Maritime Museum, and the Navy tug Hoga (YT-146), a survivor of the attack on Pearl Harbor, and the USS Razorback (SS-394), which was at the surrender in Tokyo Bay

== Sports ==
Dickey-Stephens Park is the location of the Arkansas Travelers baseball team.

== Parks and recreation ==
- Arkansas River Trail
- Big Rock Quarry Park, which includes a Bike Park and Pump Track
- Burns Park, one of the largest city-owned parks in the United States, contains a baseball and softball complex, soccer complex, campground, two golf courses, hiking trails, amusement park, and tennis complex.
- Campbell Lake Park
- Conley Park
- Crestview Park
- Emerald Park
- Fearneyhough Park
- Idlewild Park
- North Little Rock Riverfront Park (formally known as North Shore Riverwalk Park)
- Riverview Park, includes a skate park with street elements and a bowl
- T. R. Pugh Memorial Park, location of the Old Mill in the movie Gone With The Wind
- Vestal Park
- W.C. Faucette Memorial Park
- Witkowski Park

== Government ==
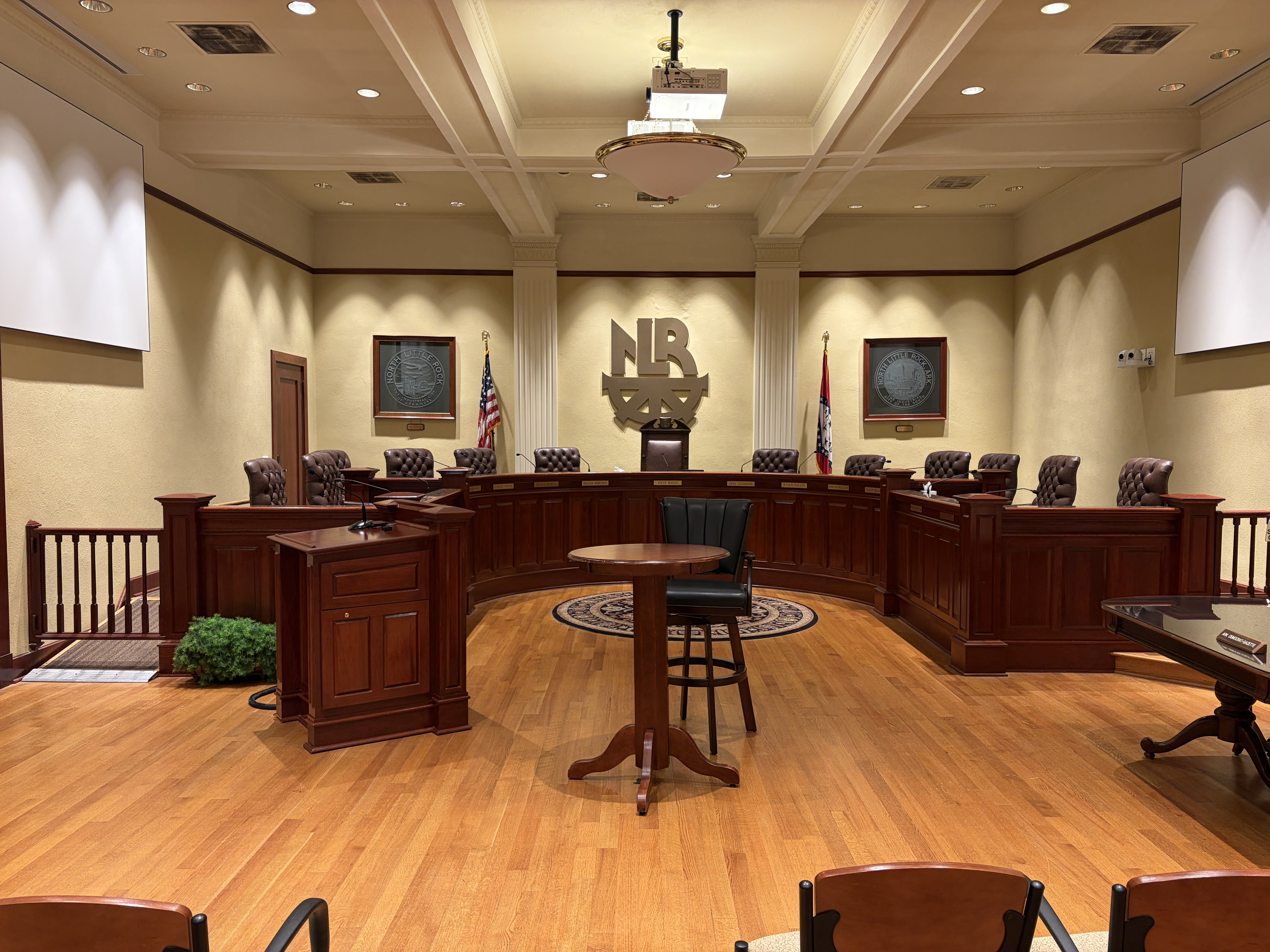
The North Little Rock city council chambers

The City of North Little Rock elected officials are a mayor, city council of eight members (with two from each of the four wards), city clerk/treasurer, city attorney, and two judges. This is supplemented by a number of boards and commissions composed of city officials and residents.

=== Intergovernmental relations ===
North Little Rock is home to the headquarters of the Arkansas Municipal League (AML), the state's only municipal representation organization. AML prides itself on providing leadership to each city or town before the state and federal governments. It is also a place for discussion and sharing of mutual concerns.

== Education ==
=== Public primary and secondary schools ===
Most students attend public schools in the North Little Rock School District which includes:

- North Little Rock High School; grades 9–12
- North Little Rock Middle School, which is subdivided into a 6th grade campus and a 7–8th grade campus
- Amboy Elementary School
- Boone Park Elementary School
- Crestwood Elementary School
- Glenview Elementary School
- Indian Hills Elementary School
- Lakewood Elementary School
- Meadow Park Elementary School
- Ridge Road Elementary School (formerly Ridge Road Middle School)
- Seventh Street Elementary School
- Pike View Early Childhood Center

The North Little Rock High School West Campus facility is listed on the National Register of Historic Places for its art-deco architecture style.

In addition, the Pulaski County Special School District administers several other North Little Rock area schools, including:

- one middle school, and
- three elementary schools and one elementary magnet school.

Scipio Jones High School was the public school for black children under segregation. It was established in 1909 and disestablished in 1970.

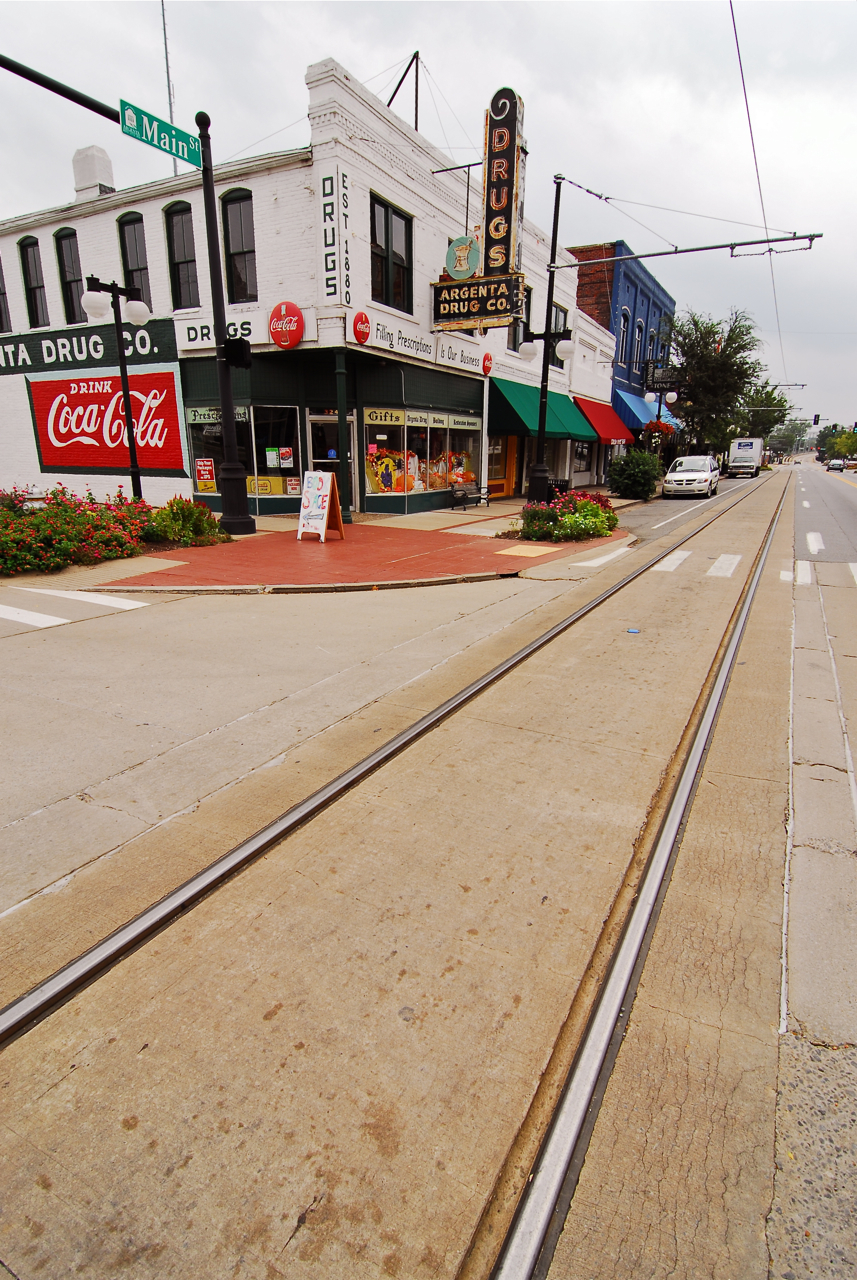
Downtown North Little Rock, known as Argenta, in September 2011

=== Private primary and secondary schools ===
In North Little Rock, there are a number of private schools:

- Calvary Academy (PreK3–12)
- Central Arkansas Christian Schools (PreK3–12)
- Immaculate Conception (K–8)
- North Little Rock Montessori
- North Little Rock Catholic Academy (PreK3–8)
  - Formed in 2007 by the merger of St. Mary School and St. Patrick School.

North Little Rock previously had a Catholic grade school for black students, St. Augustine School. It closed in 1976.

=== Post-secondary education ===
- University of Arkansas – Pulaski Technical College
- Shorter College

=== Public libraries ===
The North Little Rock Public Library System has two branches: the Argenta Branch Library and the William F. Laman branch, which was named after a former mayor.

== Infrastructure ==
=== Transportation ===
==== Highways ====
North Little Rock is also the eastern terminus of Interstate 30 and southern terminus of the Arkansas-designated portion of Interstate 57. Interstate 40, US 65, US 67, and US 167 all run through the city.

==== Bus ====
Rock Region Metro, Arkansas's largest transit agency, is headquartered in North Little Rock. Before 2015, it was known as CATA (Central Arkansas Transit Authority). That same year, all of CATA's former buses were retrofitted to be energy-efficient. Rock Region's main bus terminal is located in Little Rock nearby the city's River Market. Rock Region also has the Metro Rail streetcars, which are a group of classic black and yellow streetcars that can be seen in Little Rock’s River Market and North Little Rock’s Argenta.

==== Air ====
In the city's northern part is the North Little Rock Municipal Airport. It has several hangars and is frequented by people who fly biplanes. It is a reliever airport for Clinton National Airport.

It is home to the National Weather Service North Little Rock, Arkansas. This is a major weather service authority in the region and frequently works with major media platforms to inform Arkansans of weather patterns in the state.

=== Police ===
North Little Rock
- Crime rates* (2012)

Violent crimes
- Homicide: 8
- Rape: 9
- Robbery: 177
- Aggravated assault: 255
- Total violent crime: 449

Property crimes
- Burglary: 1,204
- Larceny-theft: 3,894
- Motor vehicle theft: 373
- Arson: 10
- Total property crime: 5,471
- Note: Reported crimes per 100,000 population Source: 2012 FBI UCR Data

The North Little Rock Police Department operates unmanned aerial vehicles and has been working with a small pilotless helicopter since 2008.

=== Fire department ===
In addition to fire and EMS calls, the North Little Rock Fire Department (NLRFD) responds to calls for their Special Operations Response Team, Haz Mat Response Team, and Water Rescue for the Arkansas River.

=== Hospitals ===
- Baptist Health Medical Center - North Little Rock
- Eugene J. Towbin Healthcare Center
- Arkansas Surgical Hospital

== Notable people ==
- Joey Lauren Adams, actress and director
- Ben M. Bogard, American Baptist Association founder, clergyman in North Little Rock
- Maxine Brown, country singer (of The Browns fame)
- A. J. Burnett, former Major League Baseball (MLB) pitcher
- John Burkhalter, businessman and politician
- Maurice Clemmons, perpetrator of 2009 Lakewood shooting
- Donnie Copeland, Pentecostal pastor and member of the Arkansas House of Representatives
- Jeremy Davis, bassist for pop-punk band Paramore
- Pat Hays, former mayor of North Little Rock
- Cliff Hoofman, Justice on the Arkansas Supreme Court
- Jerry Jones, owner of the Dallas Cowboys
- Darren McFadden, Dallas Cowboys running back
- Glenn Myatt, Major League Baseball catcher
- Tommy Norman, North Little Rock Police Officer, known for positive community policing
- Charles Robinson, Arkansas State Treasurer
- Tommy F. Robinson, North Little Rock Police Officer, Pulaski County Sheriff, U.S. Representative
- Pharoah Sanders, jazz saxophonist
- Mary Steenburgen, actress
- Jason White, guitarist for Green Day

== Sister cities ==
- Uiwang, South Korea
- Samsun, Türkiye
