= Headless engine =

A headless engine or fixed-head engine is an engine where the end of the cylinder is cast as one piece with the cylinder and crankcase. The most well known headless engines are the Honda GC, historical examples include the Fairbanks-Morse Z and the Witte Headless hit-and-miss engine.

In the 21st century, light-duty consumer-grade Honda GC-family small engines use a use such a design, termed 'uniblock' by Honda. One reason for this, apart from cost, is to produce an overall lower engine height. Being an air-cooled OHC design, this is possible thanks to current aluminum casting techniques and lack of complex hollow spaces for liquid cooling. The valves are vertical, so as to permit assembly in this confined space. On the other hand, performing basic repairs becomes so time-consuming that the engine can be considered disposable.

== See also ==
- Monobloc engine

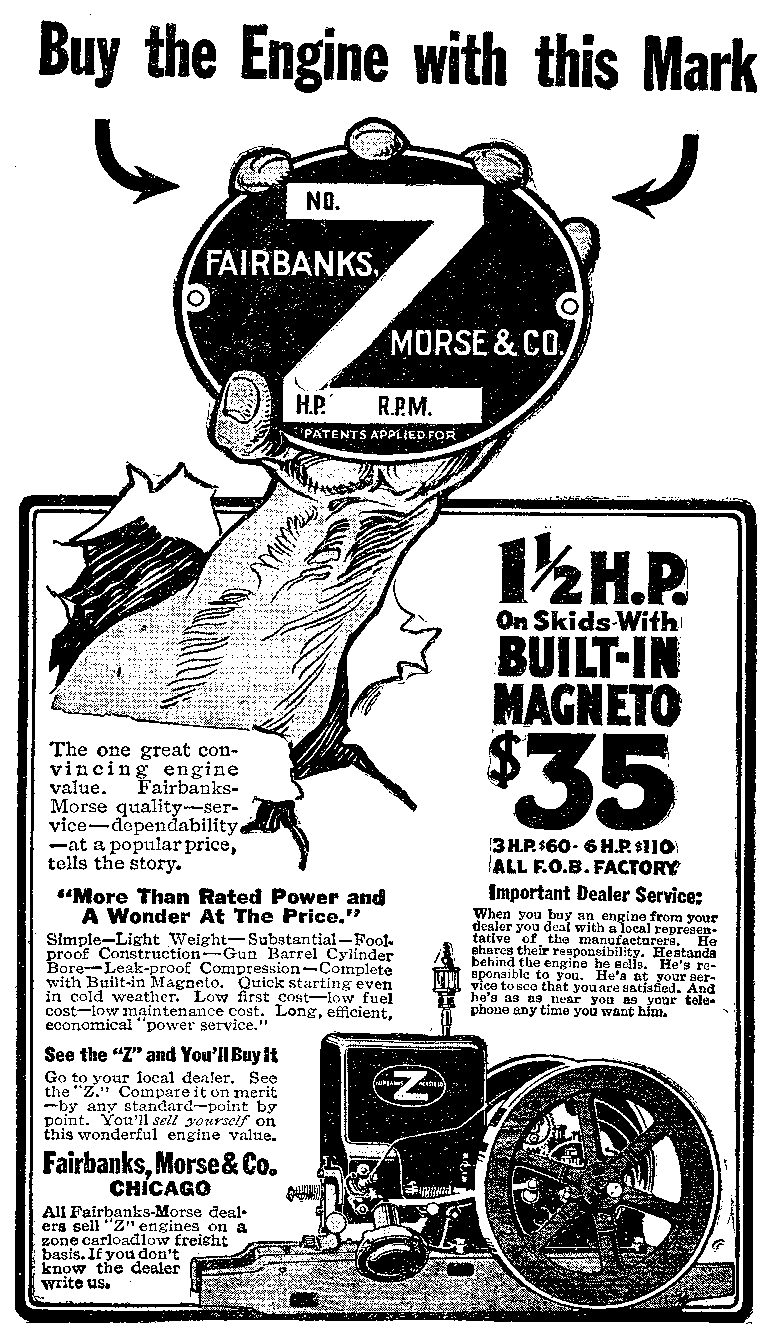
An advertisement for a headless hit-and-miss engine
