= Monobloc engine =

Type of internal combustion engine

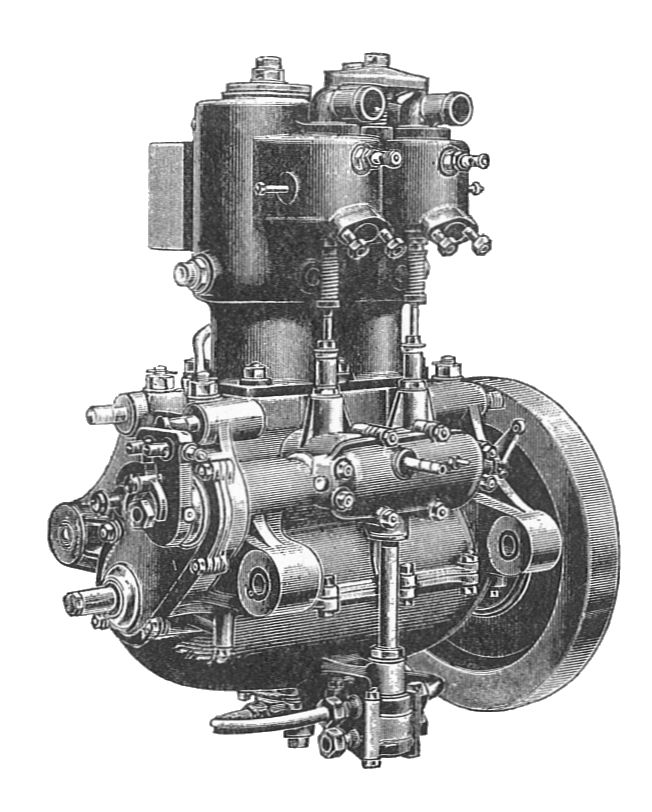
De Dion-Bouton engine with monobloc cylinder heads, but cylinders separate from crankcase c. 1905

Monobloc refers to a component that is made in one block or casting. A monobloc engine or en bloc engine is an internal-combustion piston engine some of whose major components (such as cylinder head, cylinder block, or crankcase) are formed, usually by casting, as a single integral unit, rather than being assembled later. This has the advantages of improving mechanical stiffness, and improving the reliability of the sealing between them.

Monobloc techniques date back to the beginnings of the internal combustion engine. Use of this term has changed over time, usually to address the most pressing mechanical problem affecting the engines of its day. There have been four distinct uses of the technique:

- Cylinder head and cylinder
- Cylinder block
- Cylinder block and crankcase
- combined crankcase, cylinder, and head

In most cases, any use of the term describes single-unit construction that is opposed to the more common contemporary practice. Where the monobloc technique has later become the norm, the specific term fell from favour. It is now usual practice to use monobloc cylinders and crankcases, but a monobloc head (for a water-cooled inline engine at least) would be regarded as peculiar and obsolescent.

== Cylinder head ==
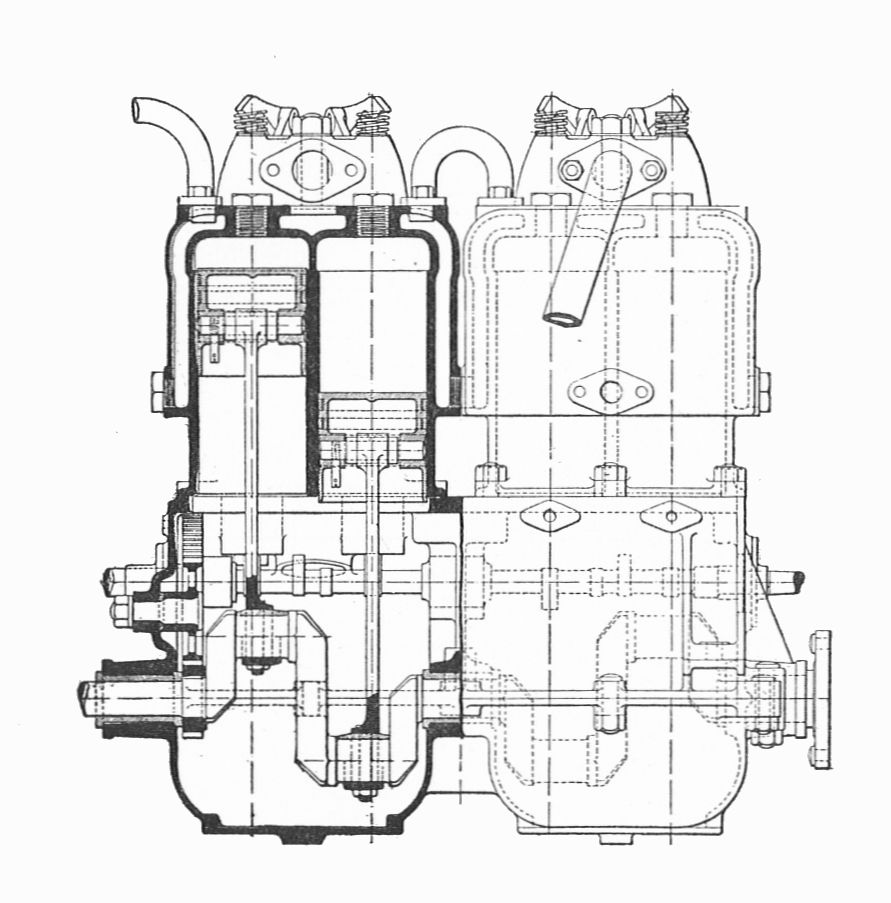
Napier engine, with monobloc head, separate cylinder blocks

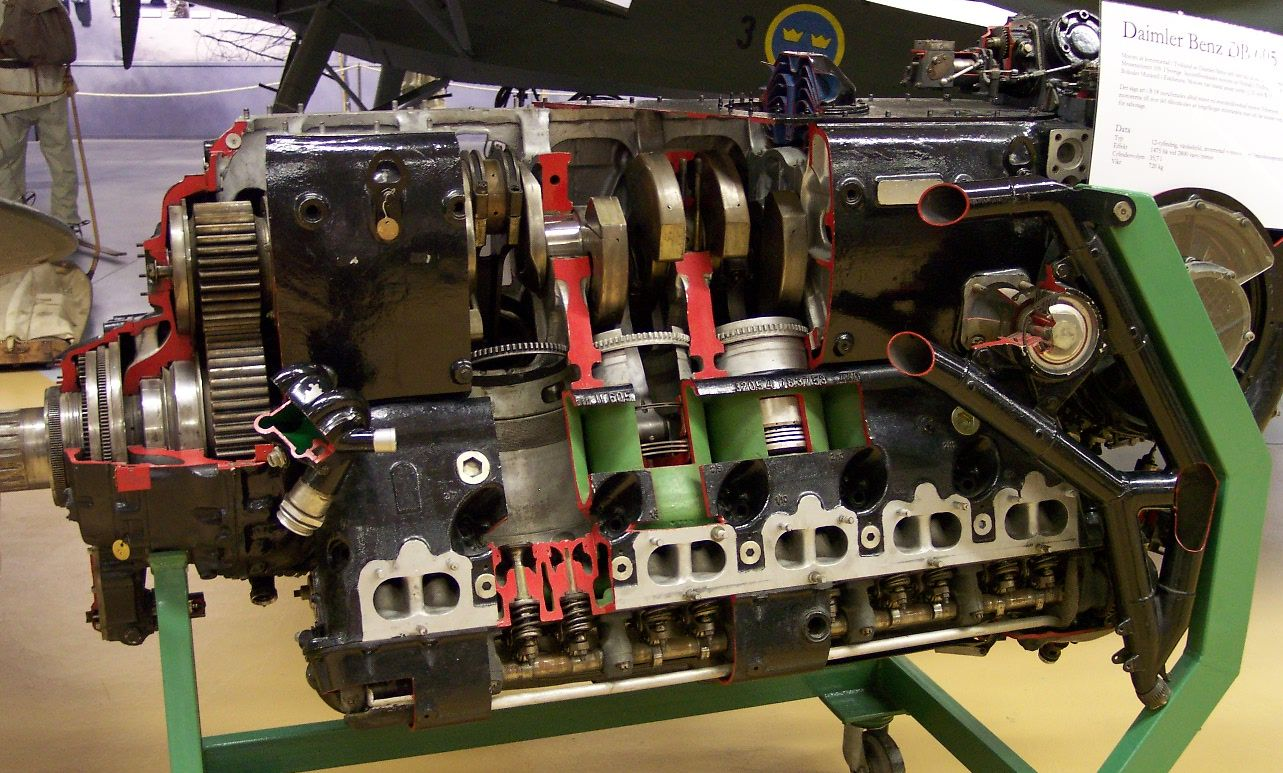
Daimler-Benz DB 605 inverted aircraft engine of WW2, with monobloc cylinder blocks and heads

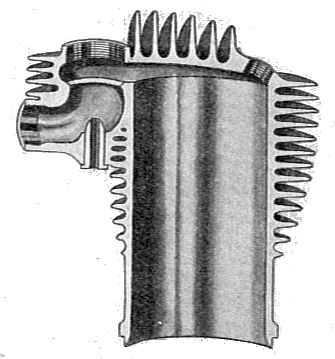
Sectioned view of an air-cooled single cylinder, with monobloc head and access plug above the side valve

The head gasket is the most highly stressed static seal in an engine, and was a source of considerable trouble in early years. The monobloc cylinder head forms both cylinder and head in one unit, thus averting the need for a seal.

Along with head gasket failure, one of the least reliable parts of the early petrol engine was the exhaust valve, which tended to fail by overheating. A monobloc head could provide good water cooling, thus reduced valve wear, as it could extend the water jacket uninterrupted around both head and cylinder. Engines with gaskets required a metal-to-metal contact face here, disrupting water flow.

The drawback to the monobloc head is that access to the inside of the combustion chamber (the upper volume of the cylinder) is difficult. Access through the cylinder bore is restricted for machining the valve seats, or for inserting angled valves. An even more serious restriction is de-coking and re-grinding valve seats, a regular task on older engines. Rather than removing the cylinder head from above, the mechanic must remove pistons, connecting rods and the crankshaft from beneath.

One solution to this for side-valve engines was to place a screwed plug directly above each valve, and to access the valves through this (illustrated). The tapered threads of the screwed plug provided a reliable seal. For low-powered engines this was a popular solution for some years, but it was difficult to cool this plug, as the water jacket didn't extend into the plug. As performance increased, it also became important to have better combustion chamber designs with less "dead space". One solution was to place the spark plug in the centre of this plug, which at least made use of the space. This placed the spark plug further from the combustion chamber, leading to long flame paths and slower ignition.

During World War I, development of the internal combustion engine greatly progressed. After the war, as civilian car production resumed, the monobloc cylinder head was required less frequently. Only high-performance cars such as the Leyland Eight of 1920 persisted with it. Bentley and Bugatti were other racing marques who notably adhered to them, through the 1920s and into the 1930s, most famously being used in the purpose-built American Offenhauser straight-four racing engines, first designed and built in the 1930s.

Aircraft engines at this time were beginning to use high supercharging pressures, increasing the stress on their head gaskets. Engines such as the Rolls-Royce Buzzard used monobloc heads for reliability.

Early versions of the Merlin (used up to the Mark 20 and Merlin 45 series) featured a single-piece block that integrated the cylinder head and block structure into one unit. The single-piece design suffered from sealing issues at the head/block joint, particularly as boost pressures increased above 14 PSI, which reduced the engine's overhaul life from 300 to 200 hours. Rolls-Royce later transitioned to a two-piece design utilizing two aluminum alloy cylinder blocks with separate, detachable cylinder heads for each block (seen in later series like the Merlin 24 and 60 series) to improve serviceability and handle higher performance demands. In initial development (PV-12/Merlin Mk 1 era), experimental cube-shaped combustion chambers with 45° exhaust valves (known as "ramp heads") were tested within a monoblock layout, but caused severe detonation and power loss before being abandoned in favor of Kestrel-derived flat-head.

The last engines to make widespread use of monobloc cylinder heads were large air-cooled aircraft radial engines, such as the Wasp Major. These have individual cylinder barrels, so access is less restricted than on an inline engine with a monobloc crankcase and cylinders, as most modern engines are. As they have high specific power and require great reliability, the advantages of the monobloc remained attractive.

General aviation engines such as Franklin, Continental, and Lycoming are still manufactured new and continue to use monobloc individual cylinders, although Franklin uses a removable sleeve. A combination of materials are used in their construction, such as steel for the cylinder barrels and aluminum alloys for the cylinder heads to save weight. Common rebuilding techniques include chrome plating the inside of the cylinder barrels in a "cracked" finish that mimics the "cross-hatched" finish normally created by typical cylinder honing. Older engines operated on unleaded automotive gasoline as allowed by supplemental type certificates approved by the FAA may require more frequent machining replacement of valves and seats. Special tools are used to maintain valve seats in these cylinders. Non-destructive testing should be performed to look for flaws that may have arisen during extreme use, engine damage from sudden propeller stoppage or extended engine operation at every overhaul or rebuild.

Historically the difficulties of machining, and maintaining a monobloc cylinder head were and continue to be a severe drawback. As head gaskets became able to handle greater heat and pressure, the technique went out of use. It is almost unknown today, but has found a few niche uses, as the technique of monobloc cylinder heads was adopted by the Japanese model engine manufacturer Saito Seisakusho for their glow fueled and spark ignition model four-stroke engines for RC aircraft propulsion needs.

Monobloc cylinders also continue to be used on small 2 stroke-cycle engines for power equipment used to maintain lawns and gardens, such as string trimmers, tillers and leaf blowers.

== Cylinder block ==
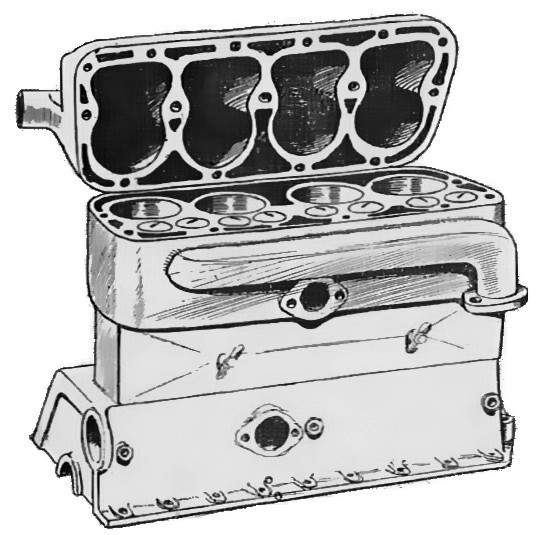
Early monobloc engine of 1919: All cylinders are cast together with the crankcase, cylinder head separate

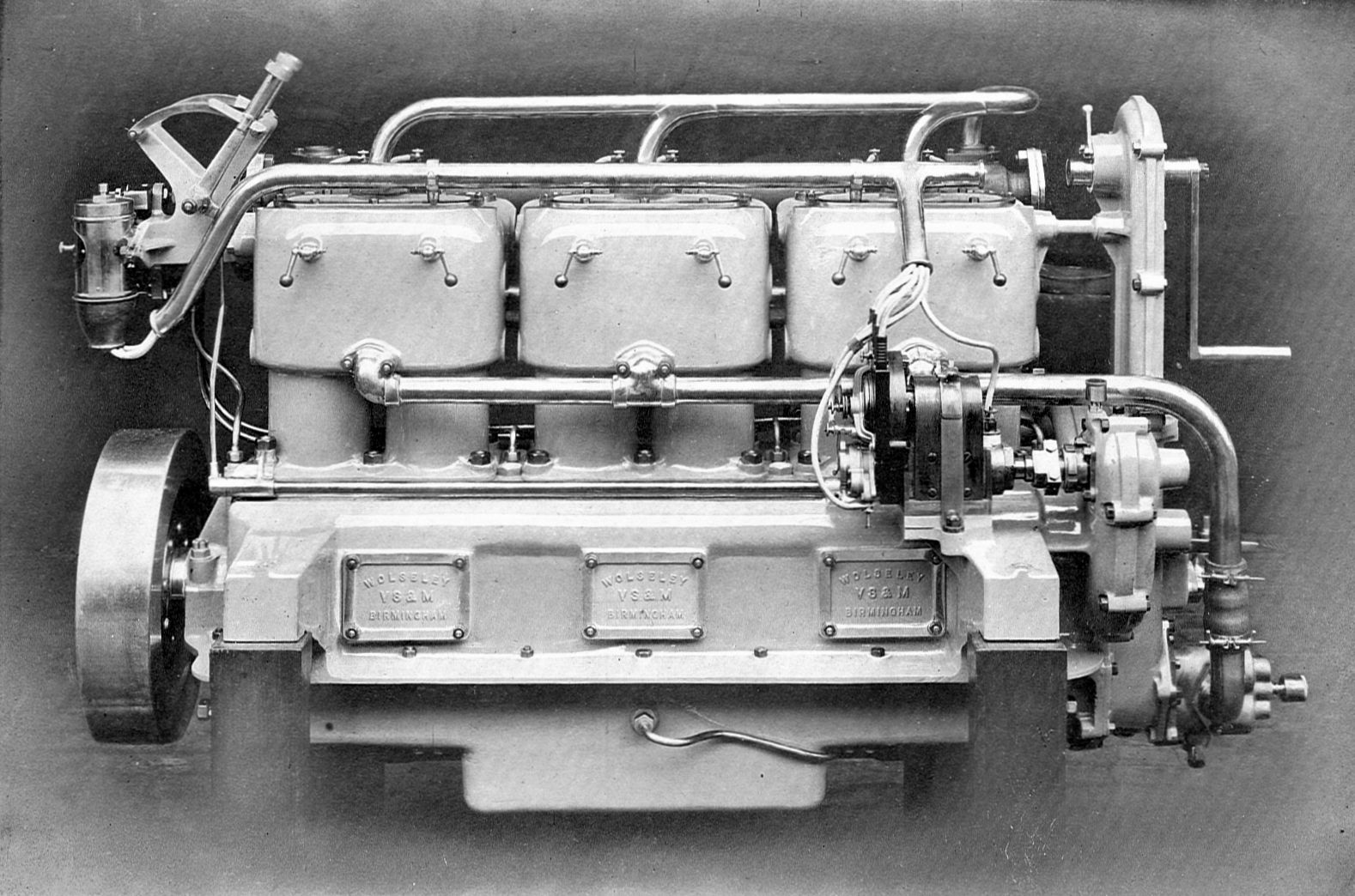
Non-monobloc engine of 1905: cylinders are cast in three pairs, but heads are monobloc style in each set of cylinders

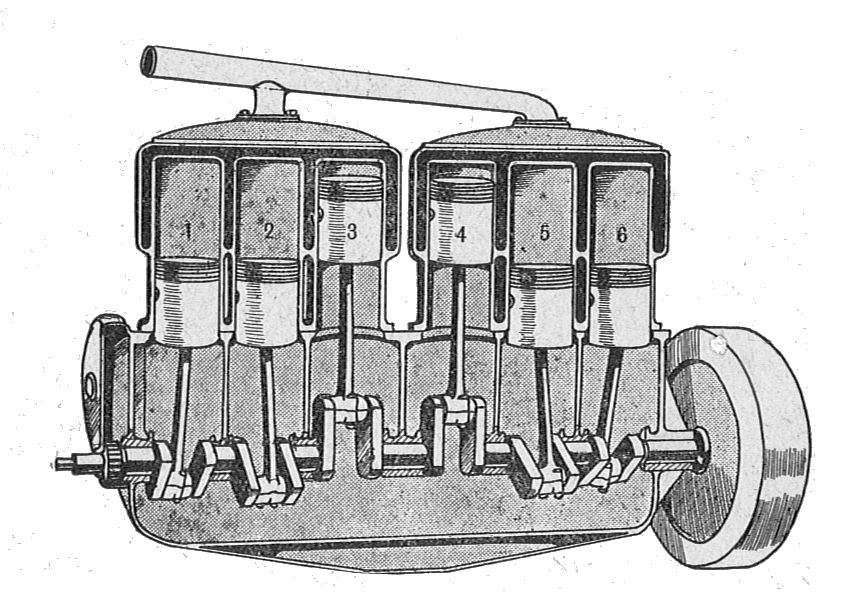
Non-monobloc engine of 1919: cylinders are cast in two blocks of three, but heads are monobloc style

Casting technology at the dawn of the internal combustion engine could reliably cast either large castings, or castings with complex internal cores to allow for water jackets, but not both simultaneously. Most early engines, particularly those with more than four cylinders, had their cylinders cast as pairs or triplets of cylinders, then bolted to a single crankcase.

As casting techniques improved, the entire cylinder block of four, six or even eight cylinders could be cast as one. This was a simpler construction, thus less expensive to manufacture, and the communal water jacket permitted closer spacing between cylinders. This also improved the mechanical stiffness of the engine, against bending and the increasingly important torsional twist, as cylinder numbers and engine lengths increased. In the context of aircraft engines, the non-monobloc precursor to monobloc cylinders was a construction where the cylinders (or at least their liners) were cast as individuals, and the outer water jacket was applied later from copper or steel sheet. This complex construction was expensive, but lightweight, and so it was only widely used for aircraft.

V engines remained with a separate block casting for each bank. The complex ducting required for inlet manifolds between the banks were too complicated to cast otherwise. For economy, a few engines, such as the V12 Pierce-Arrow, were designed to use identical castings for each bank, left and right. Some rare engines, such as the Lancia 22½° narrow-angle V12 of 1919, did use a single block casting for both banks.

A 322 cu in (5.3 L) monobloc engine was used in 1936's Series 60. It was designed to be the company's next-generation powerplant at reduced cost from the 353 and Cadillac V16. The monobloc's cylinders and crankcase were cast as a single unit, and it used hydraulic valve lifters for durability. This design allowed the creation of the mid-priced Series 60 line.

Modern cylinders, except for air-cooled engines and some V engines, are now universally cast as a single cylinder block, and modern heads are nearly always separate components.

== Crankcase ==
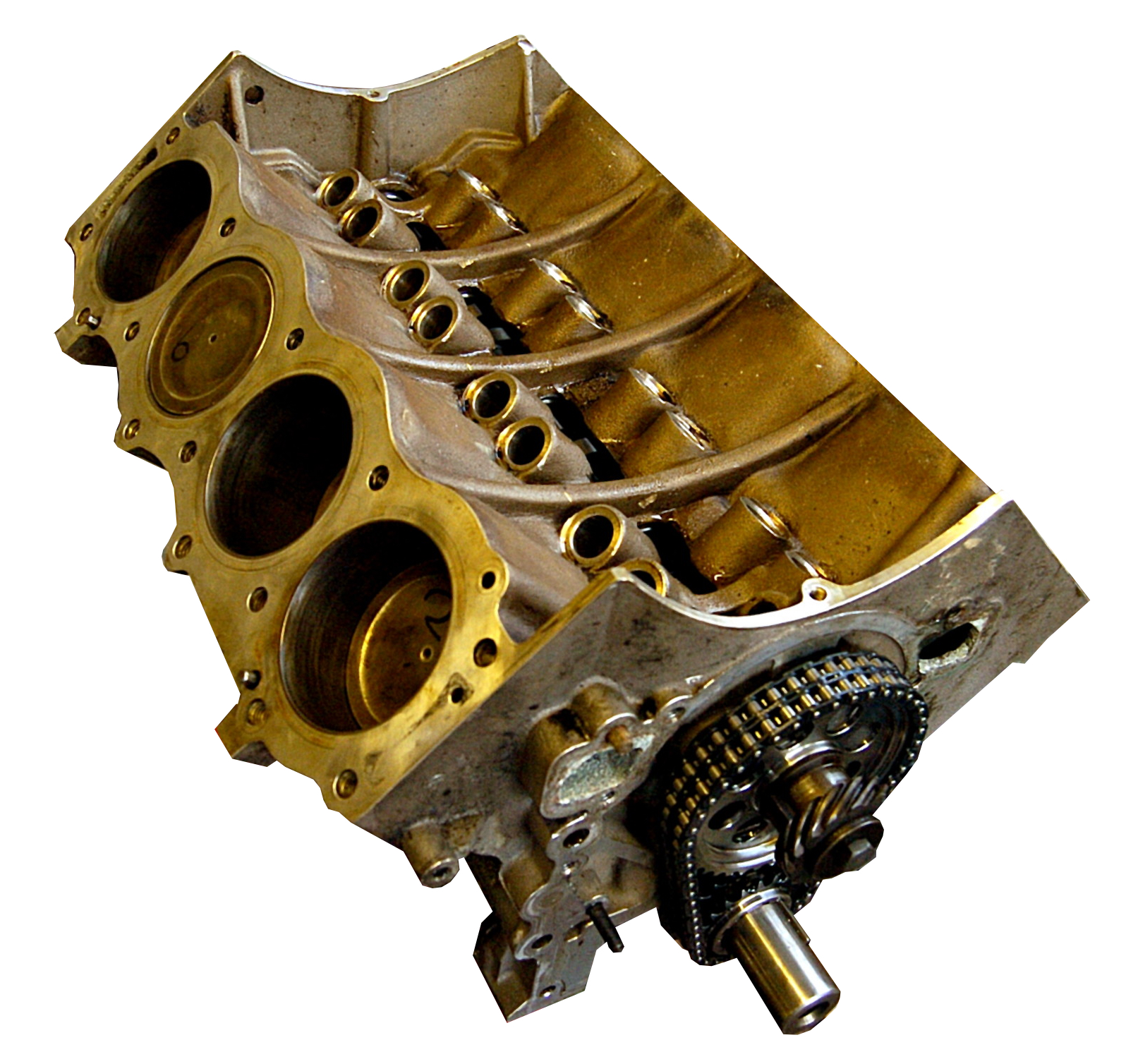
Rover V8 engine, with both blocks and crankcase formed en bloc

As casting improved and cylinder blocks became a monobloc, it also became possible to cast both cylinders and crankcase as one unit. The main reason for this was to improve stiffness of the engine construction, reducing vibration and permitting higher speeds.

Most engines, except some V engines, are now a monobloc of crankcase and cylinder block.

== Combined block, head and crankcase ==
Light-duty consumer-grade Honda GC-family small engines use a headless monobloc design where the cylinder head, block, and half the crankcase share the same casting, termed 'uniblock' by Honda. One reason for this, apart from cost, is to produce an overall lower engine height. Being an air-cooled OHC design, this is possible thanks to current aluminum casting techniques and lack of complex hollow spaces for liquid cooling. The valves are vertical, so as to permit assembly in this confined space. On the other hand, performing basic repairs becomes so time-consuming that the engine can be considered disposable. Commercial-duty Honda GX-family engines (and their many popular knock-offs) have a more conventional design of a single crankcase and cylinder casting, with a separate cylinder head.

Honda produces many other head-block-crankcase monoblocs under a variety of different names, such as the GXV-series. They may all be externally identified by a gasket which bisects the crankcase on an approximately 45° angle.
