= Witte Iron Works =

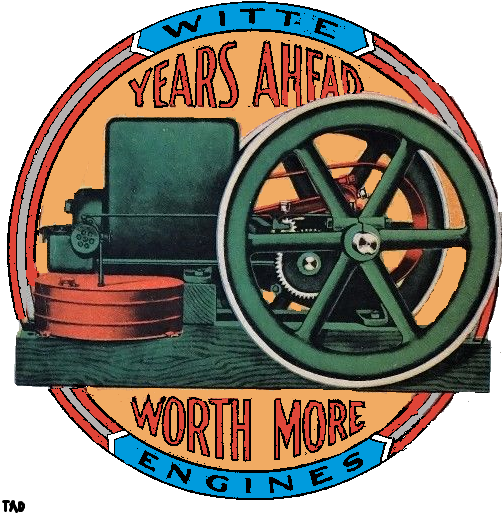
Witte logo with engine

The Witte Iron Works was a maker of hit-and-miss engines. The company was started in 1870 by August Witte in Kansas City. His son Ed Witte built the company's first crude gasoline engine in 1886. In 1894 gas engines would be the company's primary focus. They made the Witte's Junior headless engine, Witte portables, and a Dragsaw. In 1911 they started manufacturing the Simplicity line of engines. These engines were the first of the Witte models to carry the walking-beam valve mechanism that characterized the entire line until November, 1923. Witte declared that their engines paid for themselves, making them practically free. Their engines could come with saws and mud pumps. In the 1930s Witte began to offer diesel engines. Witte was purchased by the United States Steel Company in 1944. In 1966, the company once again operated as a privately owned entity.
