= Stationary engine =

Engine whose framework does not move

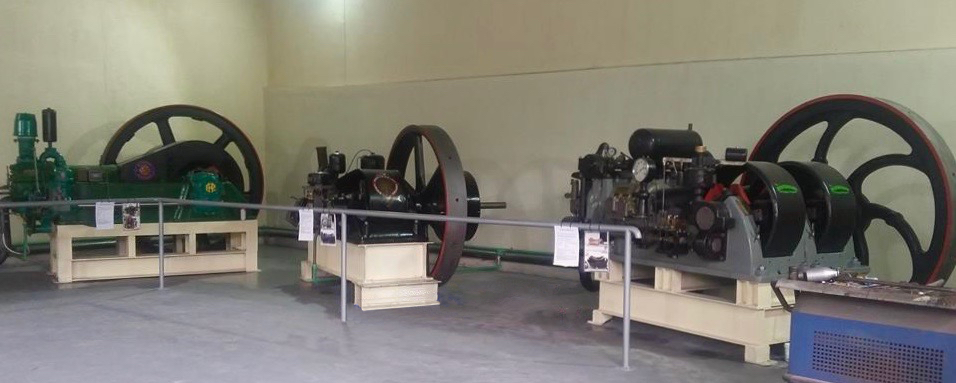
Three heavy-oil stationary engines: (l–r) a Ruston 9XHR, a Robey and a Blackstone SKG-T

A stationary engine is an engine whose framework does not move. They are used to drive immobile equipment, such as pumps, generators, mills or factory machinery, or cable cars. The term usually refers to large immobile reciprocating engines, principally stationary steam engines and, to some extent, stationary internal combustion engines. Other large immobile power sources, such as steam turbines, gas turbines, and large electric motors, are categorized separately.

Stationary engines, especially stationary steam engines were once widespread in the late Industrial Revolution. This was an era when each factory or mill generated its own power, and power transmission was mechanical (via line shafts, belts, gear trains, and clutches). Applications for stationary engines have declined since electrification has become widespread; most industrial uses today draw electricity from an electrical grid and distribute it to various individual electric motors instead.

Engines that operate in one place, but can be moved to another place for later operation, are called portable engines. Although stationary engines and portable engines are both "stationary" (not moving) while running, preferred usage (for clarity's sake) reserves the term "stationary engine" to the permanently immobile type, and "portable engine" to the mobile type.

== Types of stationary engine ==
There are many types of stationary engines. These include:

- Stationary steam engine
- Hit-and-miss engine
- Hot-bulb engine
- Hot-tube engine

== Applications ==
Stationary engines had a wide range of applications but they were especially used by small companies and operations, requiring power in limited settings at specific sites.

=== Flour mills and corn grinders ===
A flat belt could be used to connect an engine to a flour mill or corn grinder. These machines are popular at old engine shows. Corn grinders would take corn off the cob, and grind up corn into animal feed. flour mills make flour.

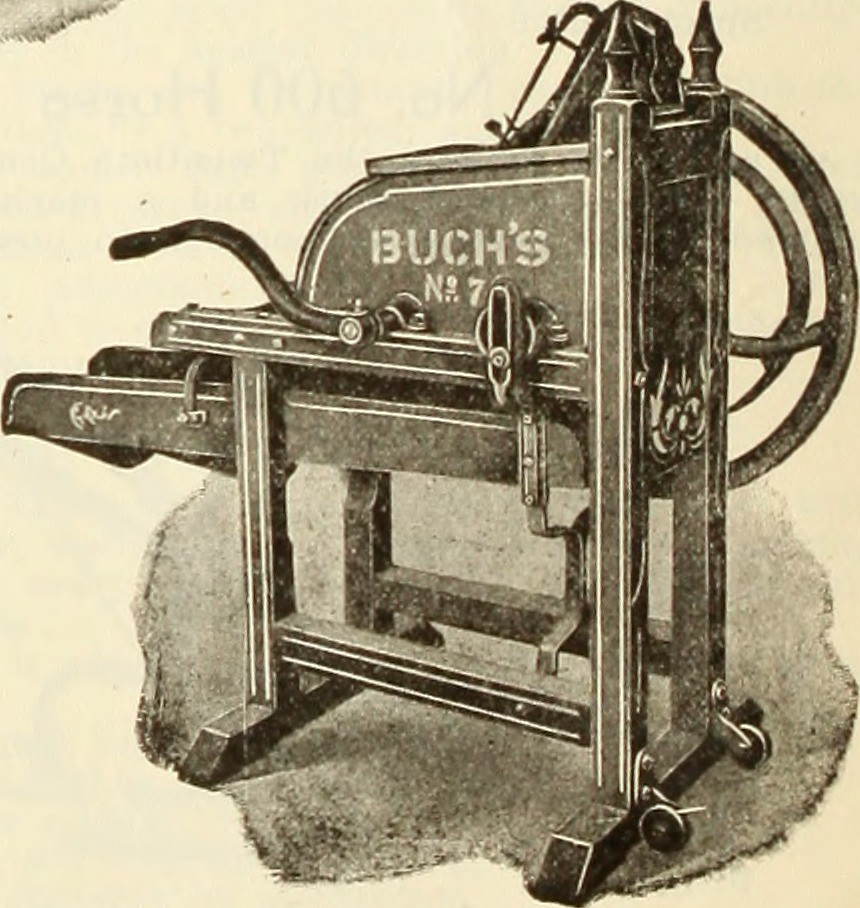
Buch corn sheller

=== Electricity generation ===
Before mains electricity and the formation of nationwide power grids, stationary engines were widely used for small-scale electricity generation. While large power stations in cities used steam turbines or high-speed reciprocating steam engines, in rural areas petrol/gasoline, paraffin/kerosene, and fuel oil-powered internal combustion engines were cheaper to buy, install, and operate, since they could be started and stopped quickly to meet demand, left running unattended for long periods of time, and did not require a large dedicated engineering staff to operate and maintain. Due to their simplicity and economy, hot-bulb engines were popular for high-power applications until the diesel engine took their place from the 1920s. Smaller units were generally powered by spark-ignition engines, which were cheaper to buy and required less space to install.

Most engines of the late-19th and early-20th centuries ran at speeds too low to drive a dynamo or alternator directly. As with other equipment, the generator was driven off the engine's flywheel by a broad flat belt. The pulley on the generator was much smaller than the flywheel, providing the required 'gearing up' effect. Later spark-ignition engines developed from the 1920s could be directly coupled.

Up to the 1930s most rural houses in Europe and North America needed their own generating equipment if electric light was fitted. Engines would often be installed in a dedicated "engine house", which was usually an outbuilding separate from the main house to reduce the interference from the engine noise. The engine house would contain the engine, the generator, the necessary switchgear and fuses, as well as the engine's fuel supply and usually a dedicated workshop space with equipment to service and repair the engine. Wealthy households could afford to employ a dedicated engineer to maintain the equipment, but as the demand for electricity spread to smaller homes, manufacturers produced engines that required less maintenance and that did not need specialist training to operate.

Such generator sets were also used in industrial complexes and public buildings – anywhere where electricity was required but mains electricity was not available.

Most countries in the Western world completed large-scale rural electrification in the years following World War II, making individual generating plants obsolete for front-line use. However, even in countries with a reliable mains supply, many buildings are still fitted with modern diesel generators for emergency use, such as hospitals and pumping stations. This network of generators often forms a crucial part of the national electricity system's strategy for coping with periods of high demand.

=== Pumping stations ===
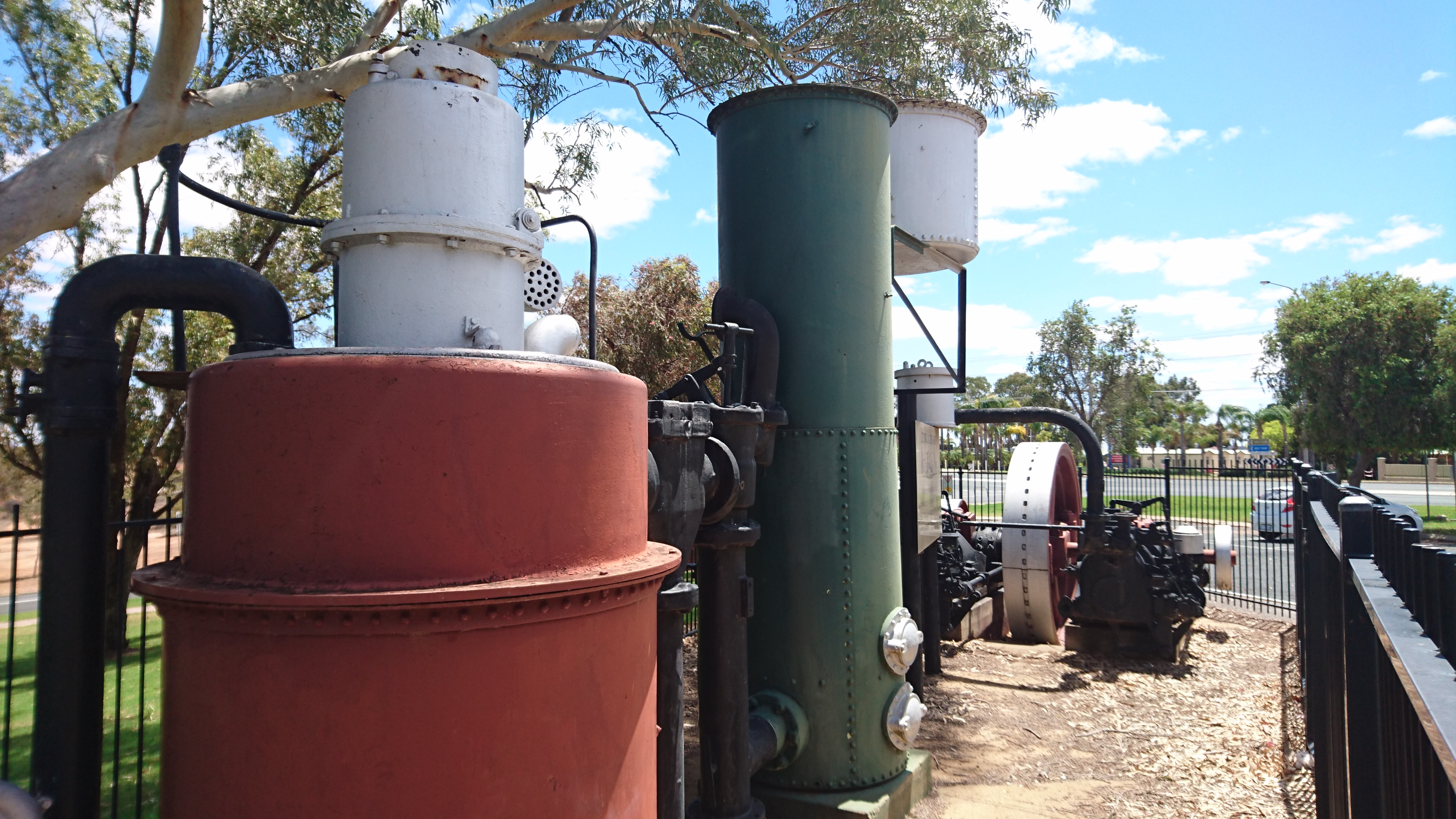
Ruston 2cyl gas engine, at Dareton, New South Wales (Wentworth Region). The coke gas producer is at left, that feeds the 2cylinder 128 horsepower (95 kW) engine with 6-ton flywheel. This ran the irrigation pump to draw water from the Murray River for the Coomealla Irrigation Area. It is now an exhibit in a park in the town.

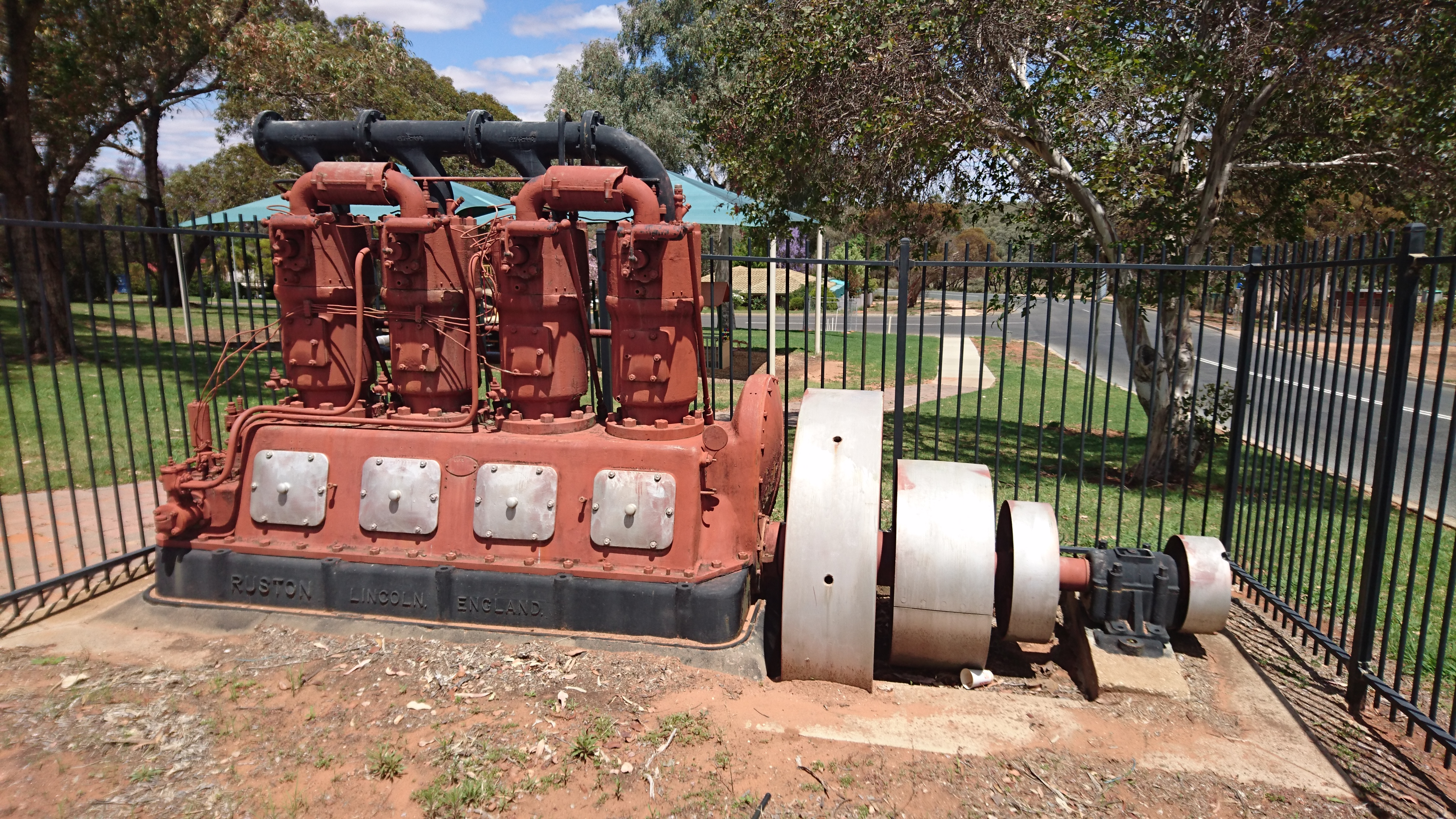
Ruston 4cyl oil-diesel engine. This ran as an engine driving an irrigation pump to draw water from the Murray River for the Coomealla Irrigation Area. It is now an exhibit.

The development of water supply and sewage removal systems required the provision of many pumping stations. In these, some form of stationary engine (steam-powered for earlier installations) is used to drive one or more pumps, although electric motors are more conventionally used nowadays.

=== Canals ===
For canals, a distinct area of application concerned the powering of boat lifts and inclined planes. Where possible these would be arranged to utilise water and gravity in a balanced system, but in some cases additional power input was required from a stationary engine for the system to work. The vast majority of these were constructed (and in many cases, demolished again) before steam engines were supplanted by internal combustion alternatives.

=== Cable haulage railways ===
Industrial railways in quarries and mines made use of cable railways based on the inclined plane idea, and certain early passenger railways in the UK were planned with lengths of cable-haulage to overcome severe gradients.

For the first proper railway, the Liverpool and Manchester of 1830, it was not clear whether locomotive traction would work, and the railway was designed with steep 1 in 100 gradients concentrated on either side of Rainhill, just in case. Had cable haulage been necessary, then inconvenient and time-consuming shunting would have been required to attach and detach the cables. The Rainhill gradients proved not to be a problem, and in the event, locomotive traction was determined to be a new technology with great potential for further development.

The steeper 1 in 50 grades from Liverpool down to the docks were operated by cable traction for several decades until locomotives improved. Cable haulage continued to be used where gradients were even steeper.

Cable haulage did prove viable where the gradients were exceptionally steep, such as the 1 in 8 gradients of the Cromford and High Peak Railway opened in 1830. Cable railways generally have two tracks with loaded wagons on one track partially balanced by empty wagons on the other, to minimize fuel costs for the stationary engine. Various kinds of rack railways were developed to overcome the lack of friction of conventional locomotives on steep gradients.

These early installations of stationary engines would all have been steam-powered initially.

== Some manufacturers of stationary engines ==
- Associated Manufactures Company US
- Blackstone & Co UK c.1882–1936
- Briggs & Stratton US
- Charter Gas Engine Company c.1883–1920
- Cushman
- Deere & Company / John Deere US
- Electro-Motive US
- Emerson-Brantingham US
- Fairbanks-Morse US
- Fuller and Johnson
- Hercules Gas Engine Company 1912–1930
- Hercules Motors Corporation 1915–1967, 1976-
- Richard Hornsby & Sons UK
- International Harvester US
- Jacobson Machine Manufacturing Company
- Kohler Company US
- Lister Petter UK
  - R A Lister and Company UK
  - Petters Limited UK
- Malkotsis Greece
- National Gas Engine Company UK
- New Holland Machine Company US
- Olds Gasoline Engine Works (Pliny Olds, sons Wallace and Ransom) (1890–1910)
- Otto Gas Engine Works
- Palmer Brothers
- Rider-Ericsson Engine Company
- Russell & Company US
- Stover Manufacturing and Engine Company
- Van Duzen Gas and Gasoline Engine Company c.1891–1898
- Waterloo Gasoline Engine Company US
- Wärtsilä
- Witte Engine Works

== Preserved stationary engines ==
Many steam rallies, like the Great Dorset Steam Fair, include an exhibit section for internal combustion stationary engines for which purpose the definition is usually extended to include any engine that was not intended primarily for the propulsion of a vehicle. Thus many are in fact portable engines, either from new or having been converted by mounting on a wheeled trolley for ease of transport and may also include such things as marine or airborne auxiliary power units and engines removed from equipment such as motor mowers. These engines have been restored by private individuals and often are exhibited in operation, powering water pumps, electric generators, hand tools, and the like.

In the UK there are few museums where visitors can see stationary engines in operation. Many museums have one or more engines but only a few specialise in the internal combustion stationary engines. Among these are the Internal Fire Museum of Power, in Wales, and the Anson Engine Museum in Cheshire. The Amberley Working Museum in West Sussex also has a number of engines, as does Kew Bridge Steam Museum in London.

== See also ==
- Canterbury and Whitstable Railway
- Diesel generator, which may be stationary
- Engine–generator, which may be stationary
- Hillclimbing (railway)
- Non-road engine
