= Willamette Valley Christian School =

Location
- 9075 Pueblo Avenue NE; Brooks, Marion County, Oregon 97305; US; 45.049124°N 122.958046°W

Information
- Type: Private
- Opened: 1967
- Principal: Matt Conniry
- Grades: K-12
- Enrollment: 171
- Colors: Blue and white
- Athletics conference: OSAA Casco League 1A-2
- Mascot: Warriors
- Accreditation: ACSI, NAAS
- Affiliation: Christian
- Website: http://www.wvcs.org
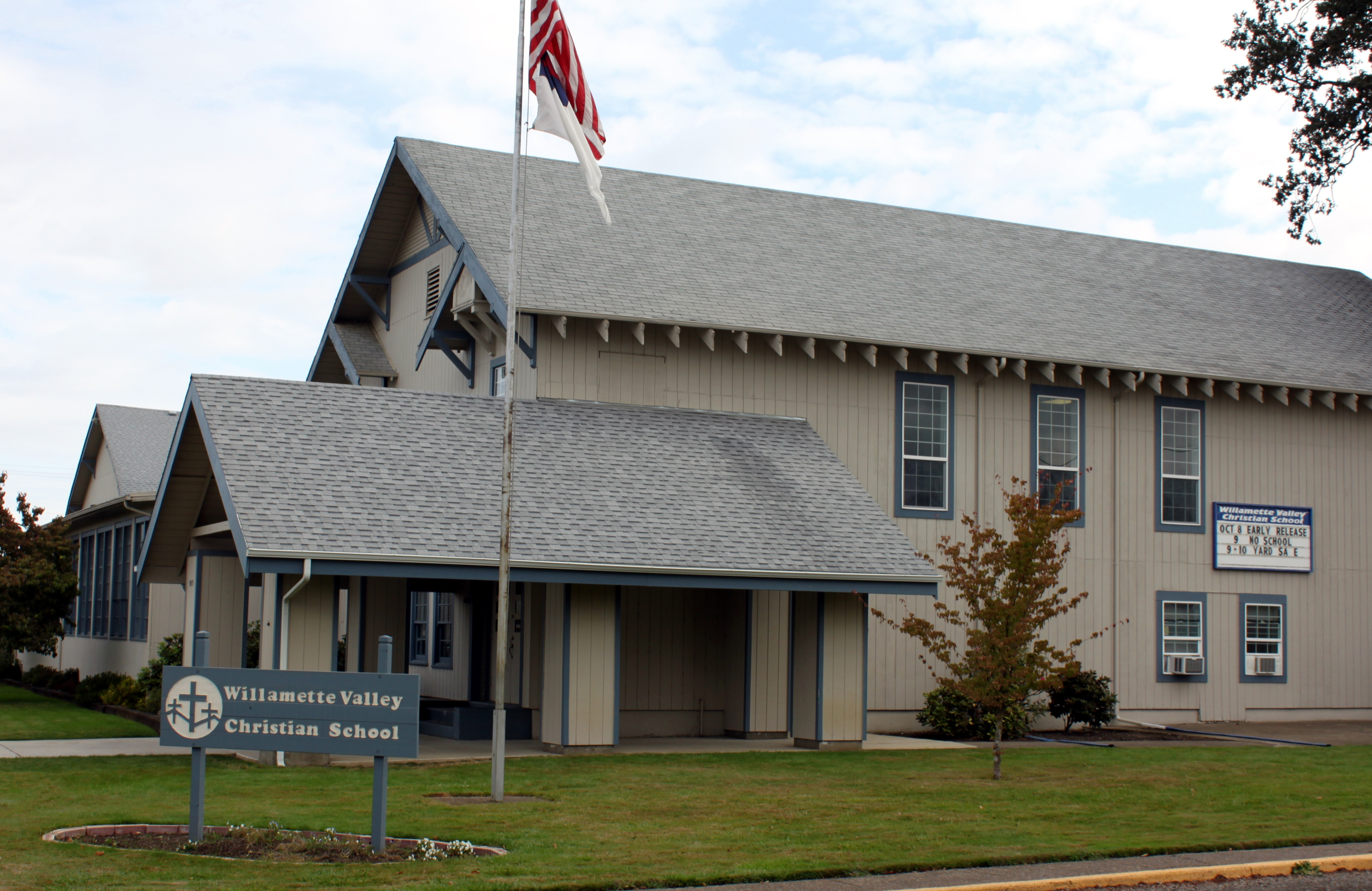

Willamette Valley Christian High School is a private Christian school in Brooks, Oregon, United States.

The school has been accredited by the Association of Christian Schools International since 1984, and by the Northwest Association of Accredited Schools since 1999.
