= Powerland Heritage Park =

Heritage site in Brooks, Oregon

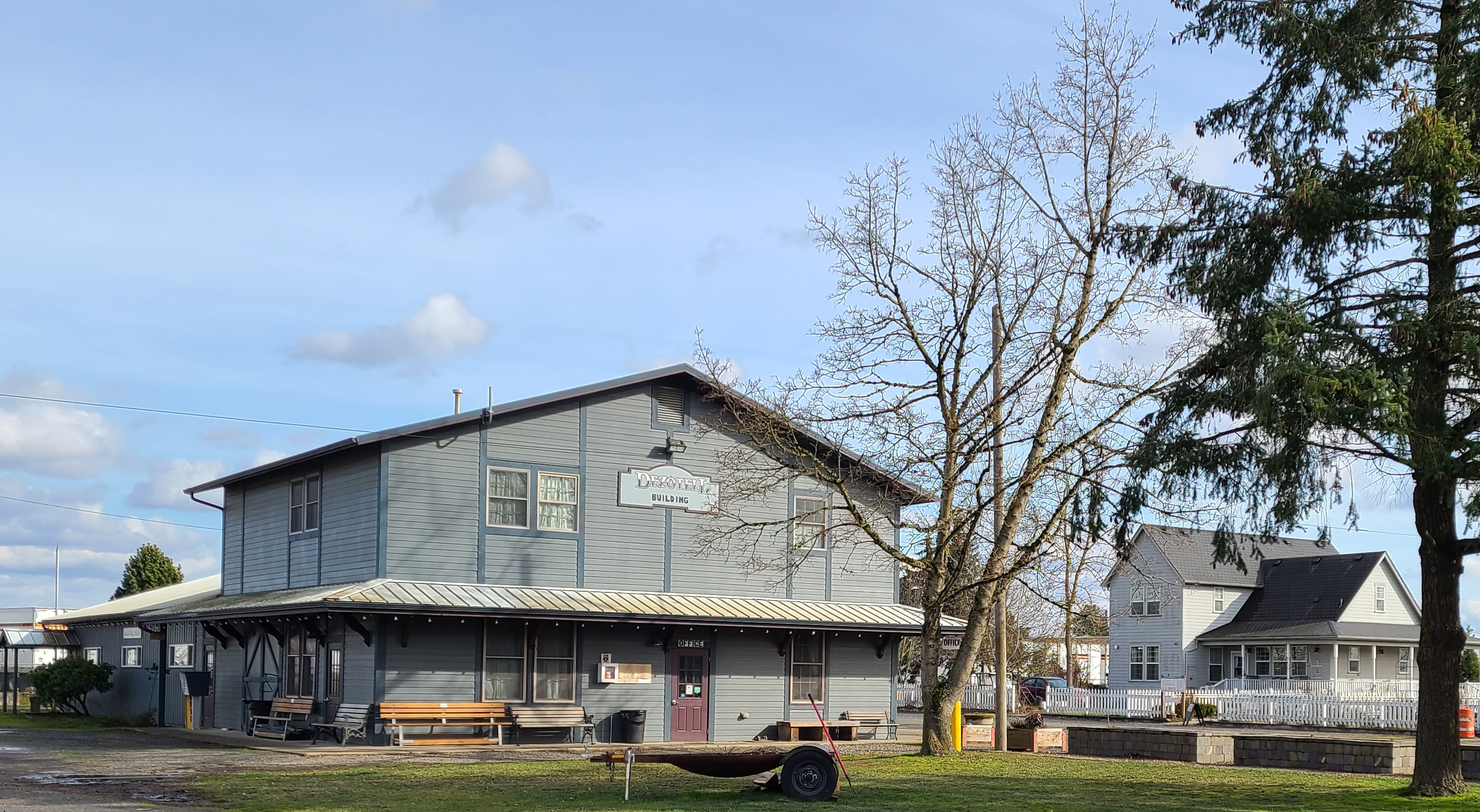
- Former name: Antique Powerland
- Established: 1970, 1996
- Location: Brooks, Oregon, United States; 45.051677°N 122.979589°W
- Website: powerlandheritagepark.com

Powerland Heritage Park, formerly known as Antique Powerland, is a collection of museums and a self-described heritage site for power equipment, such as farm machinery, commercial trucks, trains, trolleys, construction equipment, logging equipment, and the engines which power them. It is located in Brooks, Oregon, United States (near Salem, Oregon), and is operated by the non-profit Antique Powerland Museum Association (APMA). It was initially established by a group of enthusiasts "dedicated to the preservation, restoration and demonstration of steam powered equipment, antique farm machinery and implements."

The museum is located on a 62-acre (250,000 m^{2}) parcel of land just off Interstate 5 in Brooks, and has been in operation (in various forms) since the 1970s. Originally, the site was primarily used for "threshing bees", a forerunner to the modern tractor pull, and the remainder of the site committed to farming. With the addition of a truck museum and a railroad museum, the entire grounds were dedicated to exhibits; the current structure of Antique Powerland has been in operation since 1996.

Each summer, Powerland Heritage Park presents the Great Oregon Steam-Up, wherein many of the exhibits are fired up and displayed in an operational state. Despite the name, many different types of power equipment are displayed, including steam-powered equipment, diesel-powered equipment, gasoline-powered equipment, and electric-powered equipment.

Antique Powerland was renamed Powerland Heritage Park in spring 2017.

Powerland Heritage Park is typically open April thru September, Wednesday through Sunday, 10 am to 4 pm. There are many special events throughout the season, mainly on weekends.

== Exhibits and member museums ==
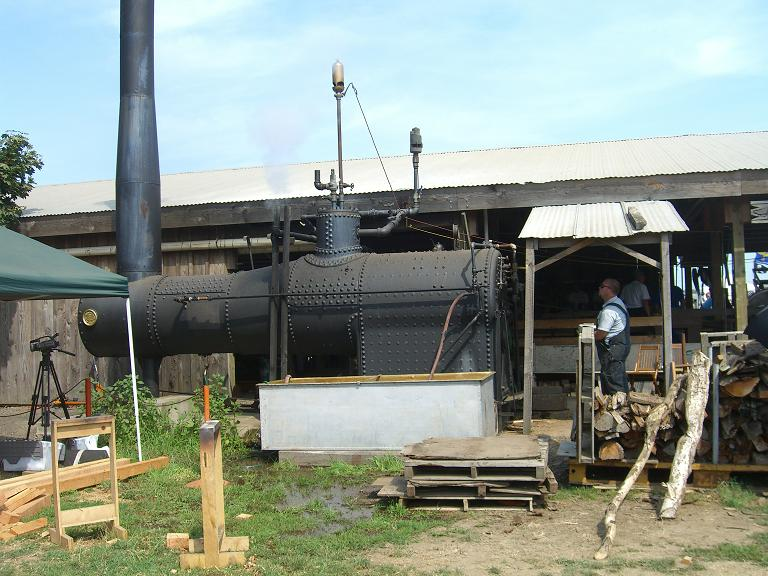
Wood-fired boiler of the steam-powered sawmill at Antique Powerland

Powerland Heritage Park is structured as a collection of museums, some indoor and some outdoor, each operating together on the Powerland Heritage Park site. The various museums focus on different types of equipment, and have different exhibits on display. Many of the exhibits are interactive; there are several operating trains and trolleys on the property which visitors can ride.

The park is operated by the non-profit Antique Powerland Museum Association, which manages the Entrance Welcome Museum, Farmhouse & Heritage Rose Garden, Miller Steam Sawmill, Country Store, Blacksmith Shop, and maintains a tractor collection.

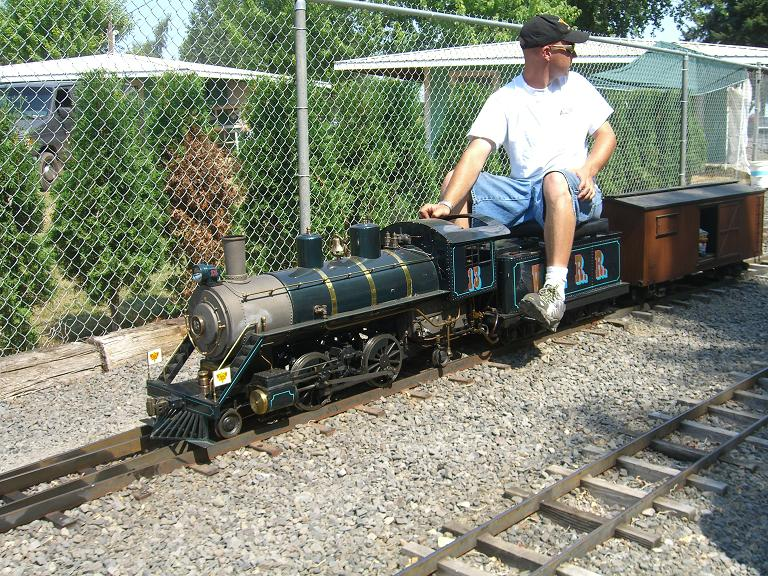
Person driving large-scale model railroad locomotive

Member museums, along with the equipment exhibited, include:

- Western Steam Fiends Association. A steam heritage group, which exhibits and operates various types of steam-powered equipment, including tractors, a rail-mounted steam crane, and an operating wood-fired, steam-powered sawmill, which is used to mill lumber for exhibit construction.
- Branch 15 - Early Day Gas Engines & Tractors Association. An organization which exhibits small engines, tractors, and related farm implements. Operates a museum housing machinery from the Wolf Iron Works dragsaw factory.
- Antique Implement Society. Displays large operating oil and gas engines.
- Willow Creek Railroad. Operates a large-scale model railroad on the site, with over 5,000 feet (1,500 m) of trackage, which visitors can ride (two riders per train car). Includes both gasoline and steam-powered engines.
- Oregon Vintage Machinery Museum. An association of John Deere enthusiasts; exhibits John Deere Tractors and implements, and operates a 3-acre (12,000 m^{2}) wheat field on the premises.

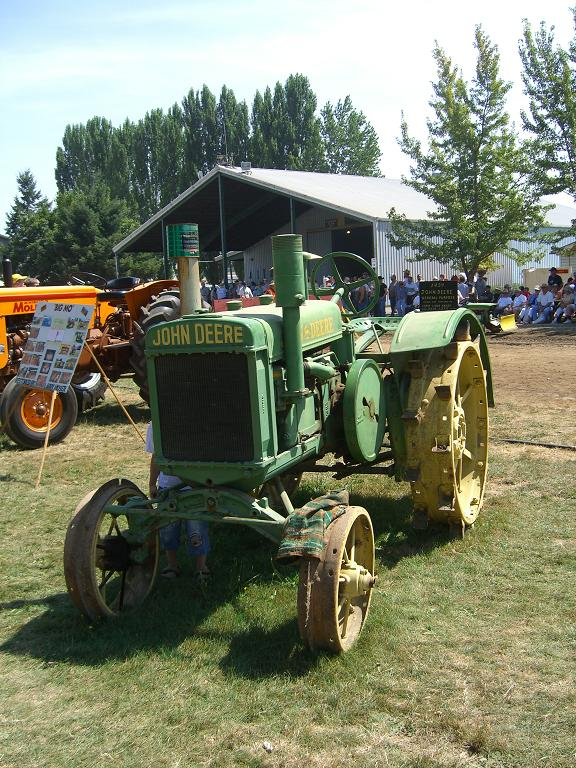
Antique John Deere tractor

- Blacksmith's. Operates Powerland's machine shop and blacksmith shop.

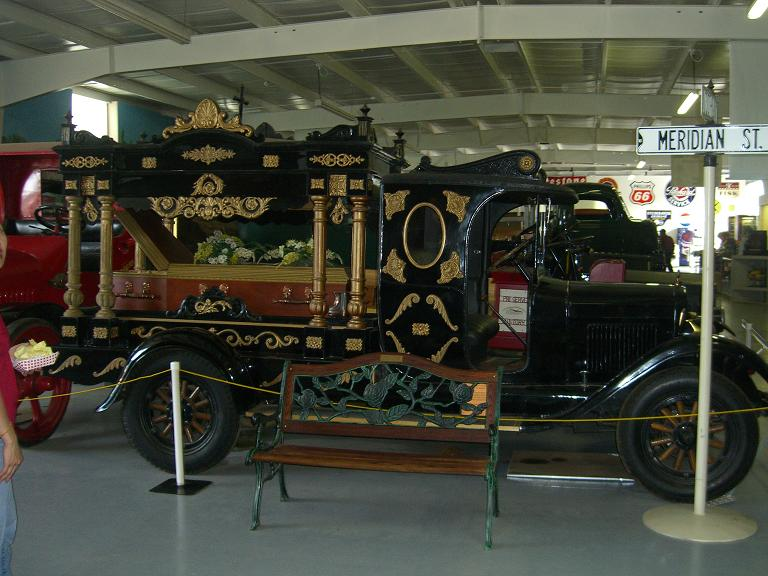
1920s hearse, with open casket and mannequin inside

- Brooks Historical Society. Maintains and operates the historic 1900-built Brooks railroad depot, now relocated to the grounds of Powerland.
- Pacific Northwest Truck Museum. An organization which preserves trucking history and vintage trucks, emphasizing trucking in the Pacific Northwest. Operates a 26,300 square feet (2,440 m^{2}) indoor museum, with 75 restored trucks on display, divided into three buildings—two containing small trucks such as pickups and delivery vans, the other containing semi-trailers and tractors.

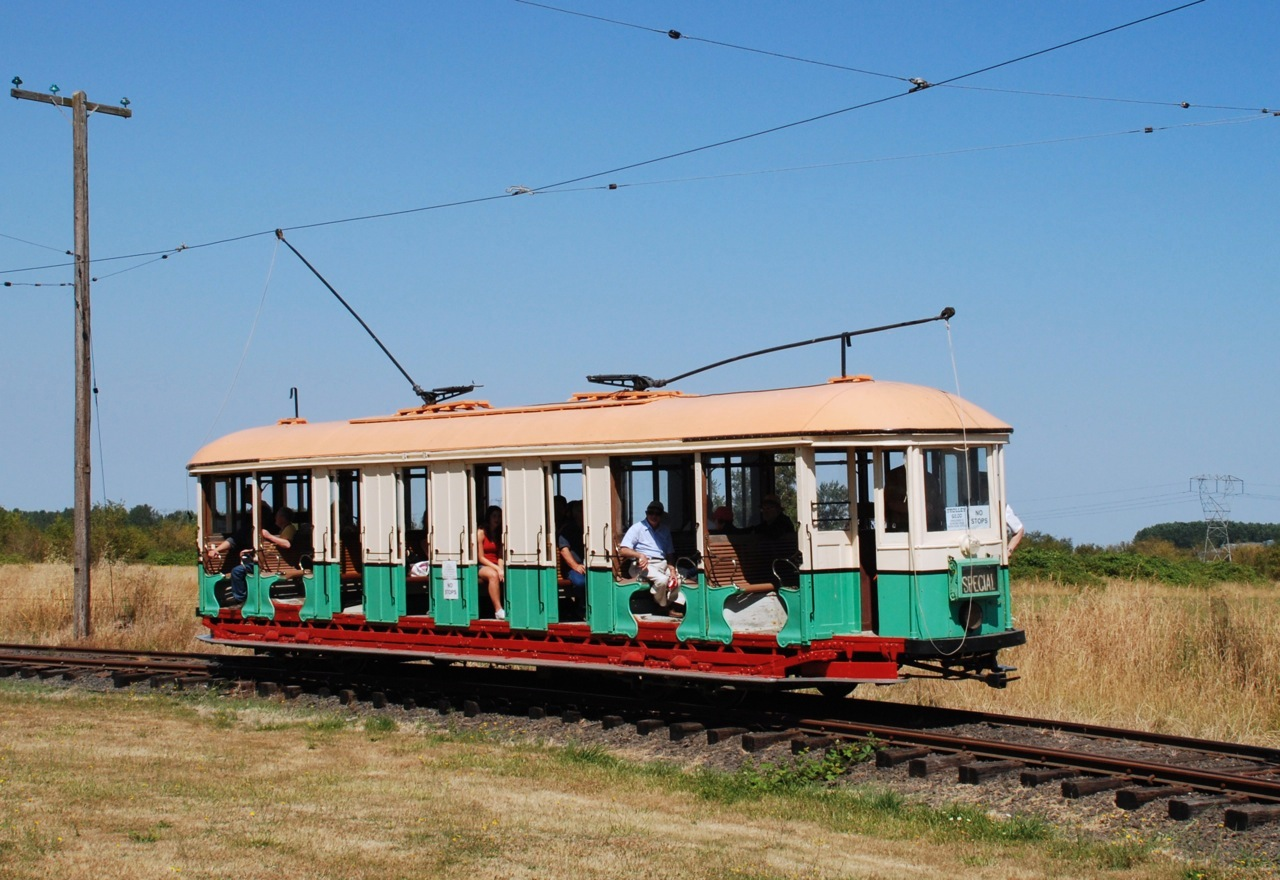
Electric trolley car at Antique Powerland

- Oregon Electric Railway Historical Society. A society dedicated to preserving the regional heritage of electric rail transportation. The society operates the Oregon Electric Railway Museum at Powerland, and operates a vintage electric trolley which runs along the perimeter of the site.

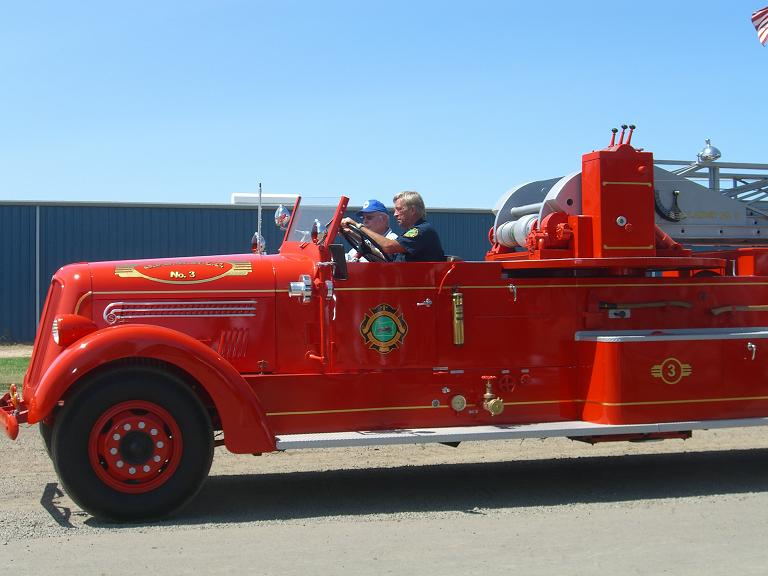
Antique fire engine

- Oregon Fire Service Museum, Memorial, and Learning Center. Established in 1993 to preserve the heritage of firefighting in Oregon. Maintains a collection of antique fire engines of various vintage.
- Antique Caterpillar Machinery Museum. Exhibits equipment manufactured by Caterpillar Inc.
- Willamette Valley Model Railroad Museum. A museum dedicated to telling the story of regional railroads via model railroading.
- Northwest Vintage Car & Motorcycle Museum. A museum dedicated to the heritage of the automobile and motorcycle. Among the exhibits is a replica of a 1930s Texaco service station.
- Pacific Northwest Logging Museum. A museum dedicated to promoting public interest and education through the preservation, collection, display and interpretation of historic operational logging equipment, tools, memorabilia and other pertinent materials.
- Western Railway Preservation Society. A museum dedicated to preserving locomotives and rolling stock of narrow gauge railways, and has also worked to preserve and restore other related artifacts like wayside buildings, water tanks, depots and even smaller artifacts like photos and documents. Currently building a narrow gauge line in Powerland next to the Oregon Electric Railway Museum, they also work with the Sumpter Valley Railway.

Other groups associated with Powerland Heritage Park include:

- Oregon Tractor Pullers, Inc. Operates tractor pulls involving vintage tractors at the site.
- Pacific Northwest Chapter of the National Railway Historical Society. An organization whose mission is to preserve and document railroad history that belongs to the Pacific Northwest. They have a three pieces of historic regional railroad equipment on display at Powerland Heritage Park.

== Great Oregon Steam-Up ==
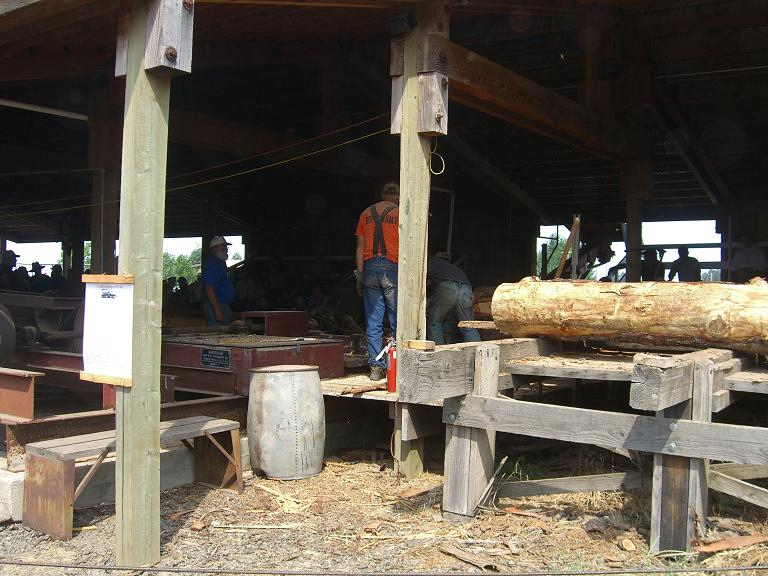
Workers milling logs in the steam-powered sawmill, during the Great Oregon Steam-Up of 2006

The signature event at Powerland Heritage Park is the Great Oregon Steam-Up, an event held each year during mid-summer (end of July and beginning of August) when many of the exhibits, normally displayed in a non-operational state, are fired up and shown running. The Steam-Up includes events such as a parade of vintage power equipment, sawmill demonstrations, demonstrations of using vintage equipment to harvest wheat. There are also numerous other exhibits during Steam-Up of vintage machinery, rail, road, construction, logging, and agricultural equipment. The year 2025 marks the Steam-Up's 55th anniversary.
