= Brooks, Oregon =

Unincorporated community in the state of Oregon, United States

- Census-designated place
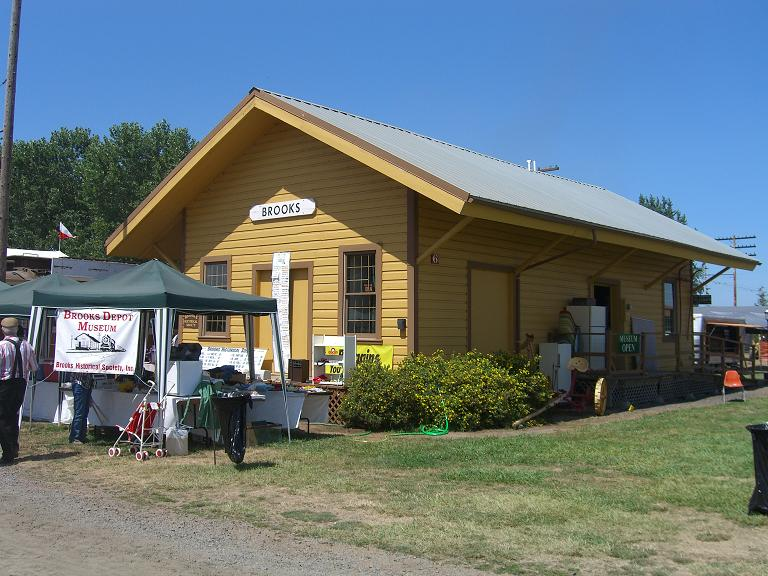
- Brooks' historic railroad depot

- Location in Marion County and the state of Oregon
- Coordinates: 45°03′03″N 122°57′27″W
- Country: United States
- State: Oregon
- County: Marion

Area
  - Total: 0.51 sq mi (1.32 km^{2})
  - Land: 0.51 sq mi (1.32 km^{2})
  - Water: 0 sq mi (0.00 km^{2})
- Elevation: 184 ft (56 m)

Population (2020)
  - Total: 472
  - Density: 924.8/sq mi (357.06/km^{2})
- Time zone: UTC-8 (Pacific (PST))
  - Summer (DST): UTC-7 (PDT)
- ZIP Code: 97305
- Area codes: 503 and 971
- FIPS code: 41-08750
- GNIS feature ID: 2407909

Brooks is an unincorporated community and census-designated place (CDP) in Marion County, Oregon, United States. As of the 2020 census the population was 472, up from 398 in 2010. Brooks is part of the Salem Metropolitan Statistical Area.

== History ==
Brooks was a station on the Southern Pacific Railroad main line (now the Union Pacific) through the Willamette Valley. The station was named for early settler Linus Brooks, who came to Oregon from Illinois in 1850. He was born in Ohio in 1805. The Brooks post office was established in 1871, about the time the railroad reached the community. Brooks was platted with 30 blocks in 1878 and had 135 residents at that time. The community did not grow appreciably and it never incorporated.

== Geography ==
Brooks is in western Marion County, about 9 miles (14 km) north-northeast of Salem, the state capital and county seat, on the French Prairie portion of the Willamette Valley. Oregon Route 99E passes through the east side of the community, leading south to Salem and northeast 8 miles (13 km) to Woodburn.

According to the U.S. Census Bureau, the Brooks CDP has a total area of 0.5 square miles (1.3 km^{2}), all land.

== Demographics ==
Historical population
| Census | Pop. | Note | %± |
|---|---|---|---|
| 2000 | 410 | | — |
| 2010 | 398 | | −2.9% |
| 2020 | 472 | | 18.6% |
U.S. Decennial Census

As of the census of 2000, there were 410 people, 152 households, and 112 families residing in the CDP. The population density was 807.0 inhabitants per square mile (311.6/km^{2}). There were 158 housing units at an average density of 311.0 per square mile (120.1/km^{2}). The racial makeup of the CDP was 82.68% White, 0.24% African American, 1.22% Native American, 0.24% Pacific Islander, 15.12% from other races, and 0.49% from two or more races. Hispanic or Latino of any race were 22.20% of the population.

There were 152 households, out of which 30.3% had children under the age of 18 living with them, 59.9% were married couples living together, 9.9% had a female householder with no husband present, and 25.7% were non-families. 24.3% of all households were made up of individuals, and 11.2% had someone living alone who was 65 years of age or older. The average household size was 2.70 and the average family size was 3.19.

In the CDP, the population was spread out, with 26.1% under the age of 18, 9.3% from 18 to 24, 28.5% from 25 to 44, 20.0% from 45 to 64, and 16.1% who were 65 years of age or older. The median age was 35 years. For every 100 females, there were 104.0 males. For every 100 females age 18 and over, there were 95.5 males.

The median income for a household in the CDP was $25,938, and the median income for a family was $26,318. Males had a median income of $27,375 versus $18,750 for females. The per capita income for the CDP was $12,008. About 12.1% of families and 10.4% of the population were below the poverty line, including 10.4% of those under age 18 and 18.9% of those age 65 or over.

== Economy ==
For planning purposes, Brooks and the community of Hopmere together form an Urban Unincorporated Community, as designated by Marion County. The area's economy has been traditionally based on agriculture. NORPAC, a fruit and vegetable processor, is the largest industrial property in Brooks. Reworld runs a waste-to-energy garbage burning facility in Brooks that handles municipal solid waste from around the county.

== Museums and other points of interest ==
Brooks is the home of Powerland Heritage Park, formerly Antique Powerland, which houses a number of transport museums. The Brooks Historical Society is located in the former Brooks Southern Pacific railroad depot on the Powerland Heritage Park property.

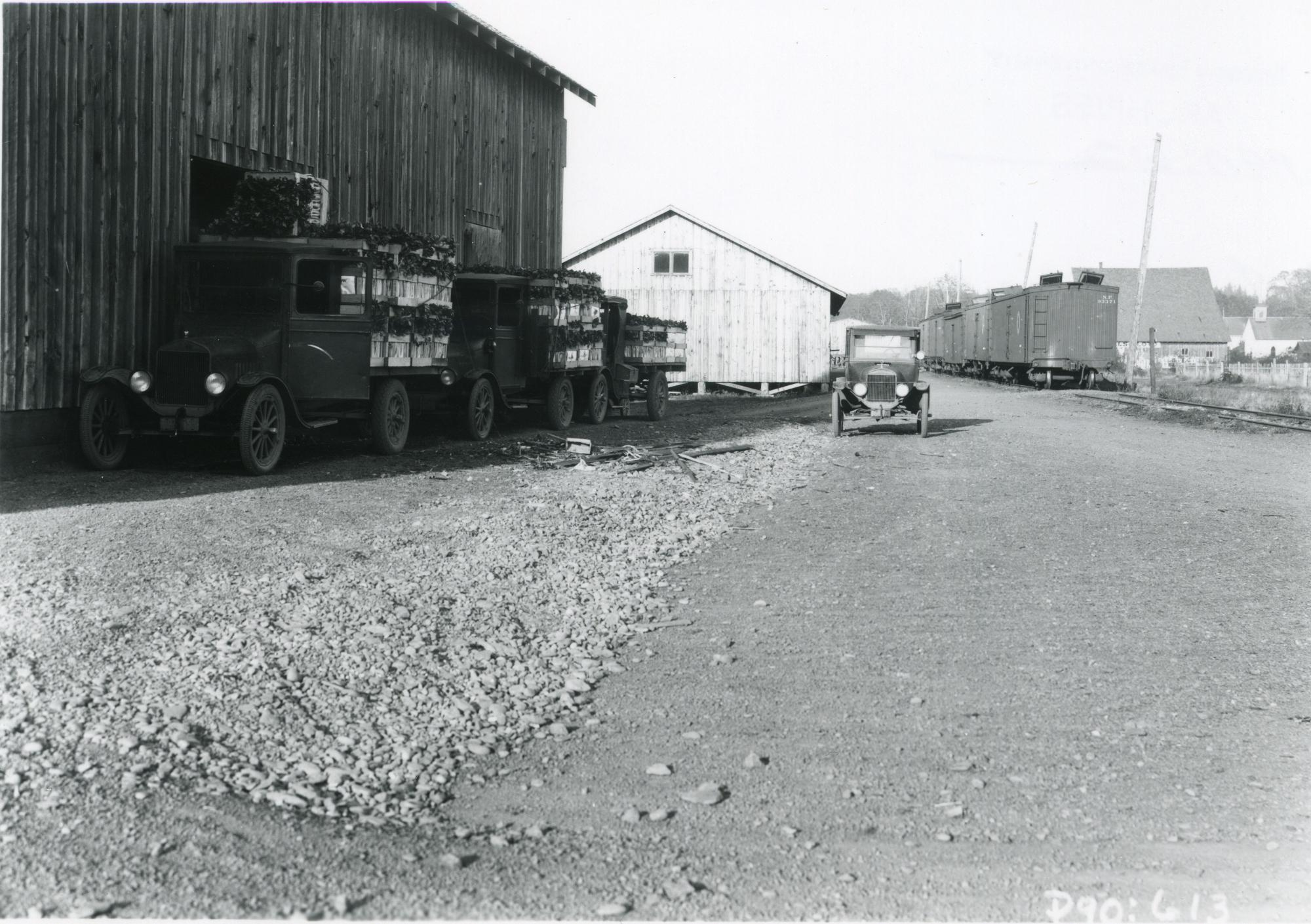
Trucks loaded with celery arriving at a loading station in preparation for being loaded into railroad cars, Lake Labish area near Brooks, Oregon

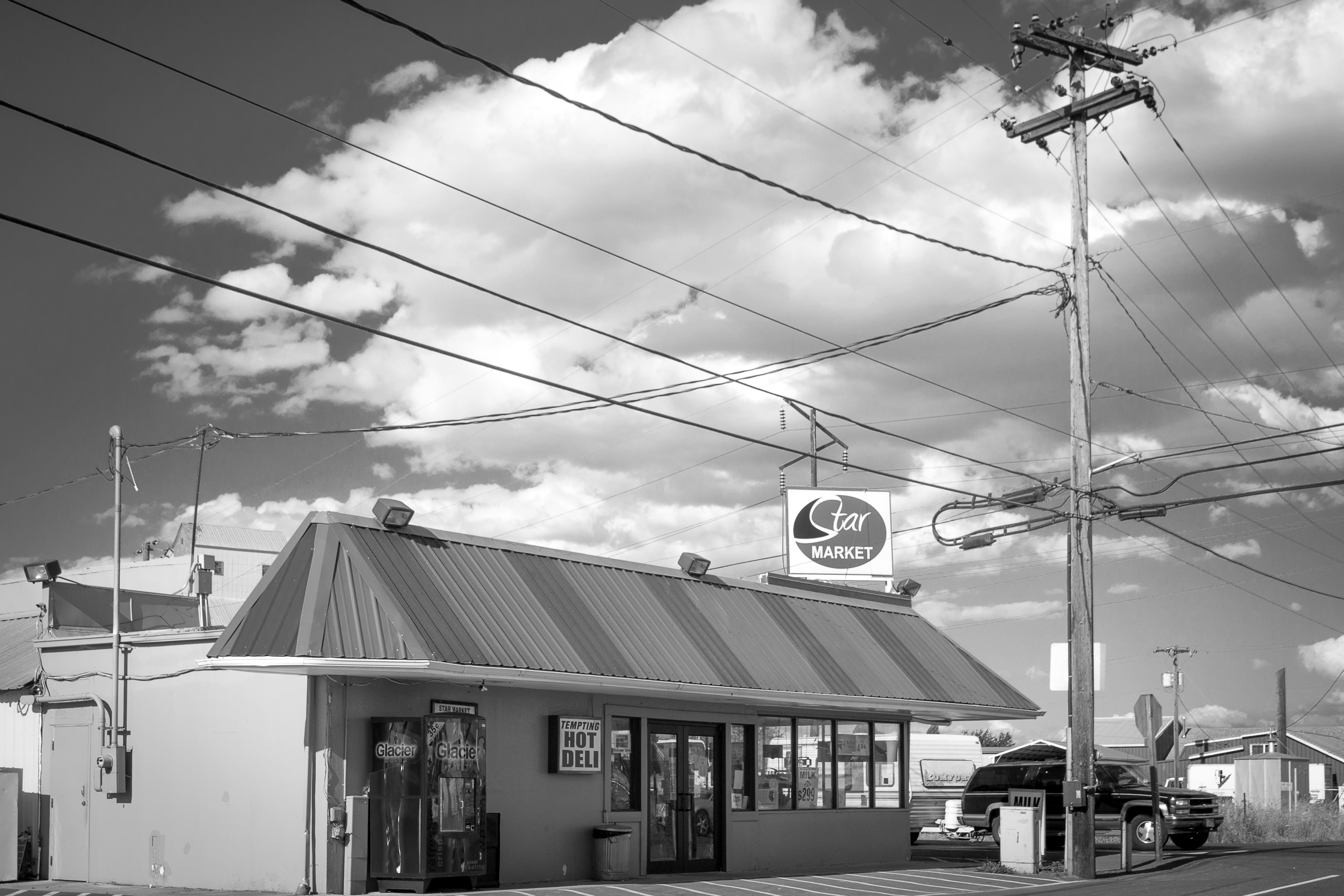
The Star Market in Brooks, Oregon

== Education ==
Brooks is served by the Gervais School District, which includes the grade 2-4 Brooks Elementary School. Students from Brooks attend middle and high school in Gervais. Brooks also is the home of the private Willamette Valley Christian School. The Chemeketa Community College Brooks campus specializes in training of public safety students and professionals.

== Notable people ==
- George Schoener, rose breeder
