= Knock off =

Knock offs are products similar to higher-end items but sold at a much lower price. This type of product may be a:

- Generic brand
- Counterfeit consumer good
- Dupe (product)
  - Mockbuster
  - Video game clone

Knock off may also refer to:

- Knock Off (film), a 1998 film starring Jean-Claude Van Damme
- "Knock Off" (song), a 2022 song by Jess Moskaluke
- "Knockoff", a 2023 song by Poppy from the album Zig
- Knockoffs (statistics), a variable selection framework in statistics

== See also ==
- Ripoff, a grossly unfavorable financial transaction
- Spinoff (media), a derivative of a creative work
