= Rina Foygel Barber =

American statistician

- Born: 1982 or 1983 (age 42–43)
- Education: Brown University; University of Chicago
- Awards: Fellow of the Institute of Mathematical Statistics; MacArthur Fellowship.
- Scientific career
- Fields: Statistics
- Workplaces: University of Chicago
- Thesis: Prediction and model selection for high-dimensional data with sparse or low-rank structure (2012)

Rina Foygel Barber (born 1982 or 1983) is an American statistician whose research includes works on the Bayesian statistics of graphical models, false discovery rates, and regularization. She is the Louis Block Professor of statistics at the University of Chicago.

== Education and career ==
Rina Foygel was born in Odesa, Ukraine. She attended Brown University, receiving a Bachelor of Science in mathematics in 2005. She taught mathematics at the Park School of Baltimore from 2005 to 2007. She completed her Masters and received her Ph.D. from the University of Chicago in 2012. Her dissertation, Prediction and model selection for high-dimensional data with sparse or low-rank structure, was jointly supervised by Mathias Drton and Nathan Srebro. After postdoctoral research at Stanford University with Emmanuel Candès, she returned to the University of Chicago as a faculty member.

== Recognition ==
Barber won a Sloan Research Fellowship in 2016. In 2017 the Institute of Mathematical Statistics (IMS) gave her their Tweedie New Researcher Award "for groundbreaking contributions in high-dimensional statistics, including the identifiability of graphical models, low-rank matrix estimation, and false discovery rate theory ... [and] development of the knockoff filter for controlled variable selection". In 2020 she won the Peter Gavin Hall IMS Early Career Prize "for outstanding contributions to the development of methodology and theory for structured high-dimensional data problems such as sparse regression, sparse nonparametric models, and low-rank models, as well as scalable optimization techniques for nonconvex problems".

She was elected as a Fellow of the IMS in 2023, for "groundbreaking contributions to selective inference including the development of the knockoff filter", "groundbreaking contributions to model-free predictive inference including the jackknife+ and adapting conformal inference to covariate shifts", and "being a role model in every possible way as a lecturer, communicator, and research adviser to students and younger researchers".

Also in 2023, she was awarded a MacArthur Fellowship, for "Developing tools to reduce false positives and improve confidence in high-dimensional data models." The MacArthur Foundation particularly cited the development of knockoff filtering and jackknife+, writing that "Barber’s innovative work at the intersection of statistics, machine learning, and data science is critical to overcoming the challenges presented by use of high-dimensional datasets."

She was elected to the National Academy of Sciences in 2025.
