= Dragsaw =

Large cutting tool

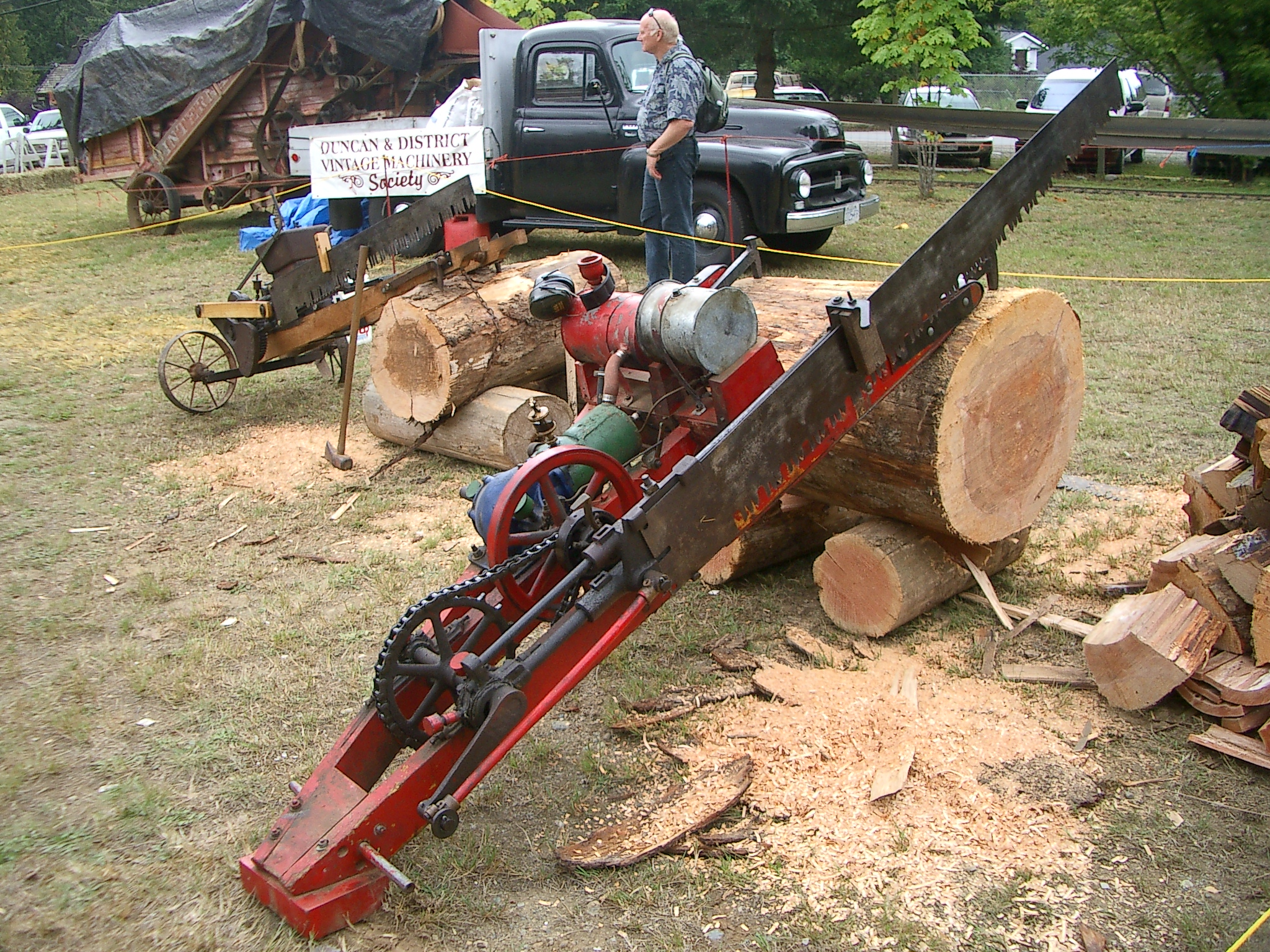
Dragsaw demonstration at Cobble Hill Fair, late August 2007, Cobble Hill, British Columbia on Vancouver Island.

A dragsaw or drag saw is a large reciprocating saw using a long steel crosscut saw to buck logs to length. Prior to the popularization of the chainsaw during World War II, the dragsaw was a popular means of taking the hard work out of cutting wood. They would only work for a log on the ground. Dragsaws are known as the first mechanical saws to be used in the timber industry operation. These tools were most useful in the logging business, because they were efficient and very resilient. Not to be confused with a steam donkey.

== History ==
Early dragsaws of the modern era were powered by levers or foot pedals, steam and later gasoline-powered. The post-modern steam-powered dragsaw was most commonly used in logging industry rather than merely clearing land due to its versatility. Many of the basic design principles from early dragsaws still apply to current products in the industry today. The inventor Robert G. Moores hypothesized that early non-mechanical versions of dragsaws may have been used to cut stone in the Fourth Dynasty, Egypt, with copper saws suspended from ropes and advancing into the stone blocks by gravity.

== Types ==
=== Human-powered ===
The human-powered dragsaw was a much more commonly used dragsaw among the general population due to their relatively low cost compared with their higher efficiency. Dragsaws powered by humans would often stem from a lever the person would use to manipulate the saw blade in a much easier manner. Other common formats included foot pedals or treadles. These allowed for greater maneuverability when clearing a tree.

=== Engine-powered ===
Gasoline or kerosene powered drag saws were popular between the 1910s-1940s when chain saws became preferable. They usually did 90 strokes of the saw per minute. Most of all gasoline-engine-powered dragsaws were made in Portland, Oregon, United States. Steam-powered dragsaws utilized a piston hooked directly to the saw blade. The boiler was separate for easier portability. "They were very reliable and very rugged and were significantly more efficient than cutting (bucking) by hand." Some engine-powered dragsaws used a separate engine and were geared to a pulley.

Manufacturers:

- Ottawa

Among the first engine-powered drag saw companies. Saws used a four-cycle hit 'n miss engine usually equipped with an angled water-hopper. Direct gear drive.

- Wolf Iron Works

Small machine shop that made saws under their own Timber Wolf name as well as Ward Sawer for Montgomery Ward. Saws were two-cycle, chain driven and had a round gas tank that contained the radiator. The factory today resides at Powerland Heritage Park.

- Vaughn

Vaughn made steam-powered drag saws. They also made drag saws of similar design to Timber Wolf between 1909-1948. After drag saws lost popularity, Vaughn made tracked tractors.

- Multnomah

Named for the county Portland, Oregon is in.

- Wee McGregor
- R.M. Wade.

== Preservation ==
Engine enthusiasts and vintage logging machinery collectors have restored many examples of engine powered dragsaws. Restored saws can be seen at some steam fairs.
