= Hit-and-miss engine =

Obsolete type of gasoline engine

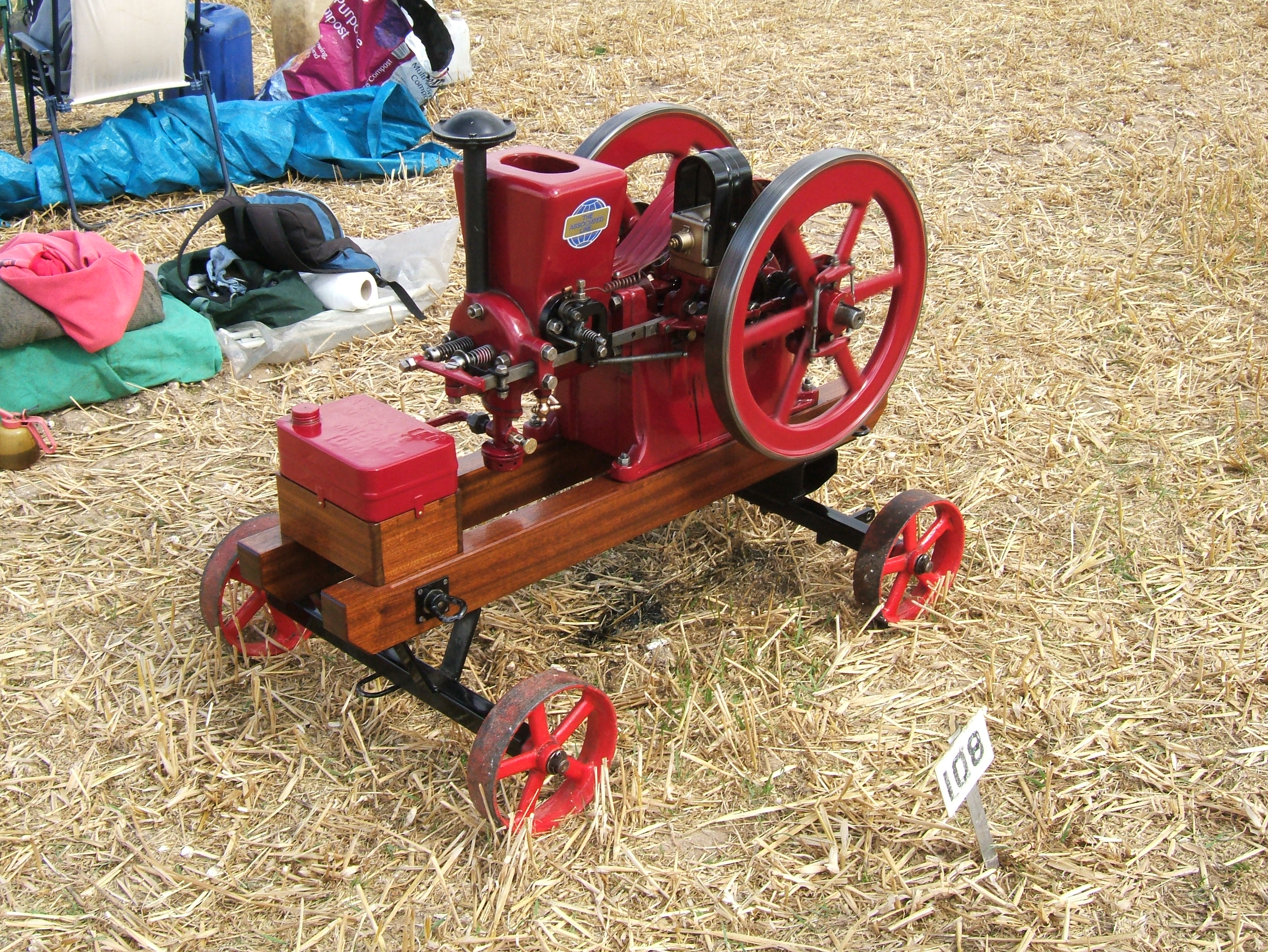
A preserved hit-and-miss engine: 1917 Amanco 2 1/4 hp (1.7 kW) 'Hired Man'

A hit-and-miss engine or Hit 'N' Miss is a type of stationary internal combustion engine that is controlled by a governor to only fire at a set speed. They are usually 4-stroke, but 2-stroke versions were also made. It was conceived in the late 19th century and produced by various companies from the 1890s through approximately the 1940s. The name comes from the speed control on these engines: they fire ("hit") only when operating at or below a set speed, and cycle without firing ("miss") when they exceed their set speed. This is as compared to the "throttle-governed" method of speed control. The sound made when the engine is running without a load is a distinctive "Snort POP whoosh whoosh whoosh whoosh snort POP" as the engine fires and then coasts until the speed decreases and it fires again to maintain its average speed. The snorting is caused by the atmospheric intake valve used on many of these engines.

Many engine manufacturers made hit-and-miss engines during their peak use—from approximately 1910 through the early 1930s, when more modern designs began to replace them. Some of the largest engine manufacturers were Landini, Stover, Hercules, International Harvester, McCormick Deering, John Deere, Maytag, and Fairbanks Morse.

In the Canadian Atlantic Provinces, primarily in Newfoundland, these engines were known, in colloquial conversation, as "Make-and-Break" engines. The main usage here was to drive traditional skiff style utility and fishing boats.

== Construction ==
This is a video montage of the Otto engines running at the Western Minnesota Steam Threshers Reunion (WMSTR), in Rollag, Minnesota. It is a type of hit-and-miss engine.

A hit-and-miss engine is a type of flywheel engine. A flywheel engine is an engine that has a large flywheel or set of flywheels connected to the crankshaft. The flywheels maintain engine speed during engine cycles that do not produce driving mechanical forces. The flywheels store energy on the combustion stroke and supply the stored energy to the mechanical load on the other three strokes of the piston. When these engines were designed, technology was less advanced, and manufacturers made all parts very large. A typical 6-horsepower (4.5 kW) engine weighs approximately 1,000 pounds (450 kilograms). Typically, the material for all significant engine parts was cast iron. Small functional pieces were made of steel and machined to tolerance.

The fuel system of a hit-and-miss engine consists of a fuel tank, fuel line, check valve, and fuel mixer. The fuel tank most typically holds gasoline, but many users started the engines with gasoline and then switched to a cheaper fuel, such as kerosene or diesel. The fuel line connects the fuel tank to the mixer. Along the fuel line, a check valve keeps the fuel from running back to the tank between combustion strokes. The mixer creates the correct fuel-air mixture by means of a needle valve attached to a weighted or spring-loaded piston, usually in conjunction with an oil-damped dashpot.

Mixer operation is simple; it contains only one moving part, the needle valve. While there are exceptions, a mixer does not store fuel in a bowl of any kind. Fuel is simply fed to the mixer, where due to the effect of Bernoulli's principle, it is self-metered in the Venturi created below the weighted piston by the action of the attached needle valve, the method used to this day in the SU carburetor.

Sparks to ignite the fuel mixture are created by either a spark plug or a device called an igniter. When a spark plug is used, the spark was generated by either a magneto or else a trembler (or "buzz") coil. A buzz coil uses battery power to generate a series of high voltage pulses that are fed to the spark plug. For igniter ignition, either a battery and coil is used or a "low-tension" magneto is used. With battery and coil ignition, a battery is wired in series with a wire coil and the igniter contacts. When the contacts of the ignitor are closed (the contacts reside inside the combustion chamber), electricity flows through the circuit. When the contacts are opened by the timing mechanism, a spark is generated across the contacts, which ignite the mixture. When a low-tension magneto (really a low-voltage high-current generator) is used, the output of the magneto is fed directly to the igniter points and the spark is generated as with a battery and coil.

Except for very large examples, lubrication was almost always manual. Main crankshaft bearings and the connecting rod bearing on the crankshaft generally have a grease cup—a small container with grease and a screwed-on cover.

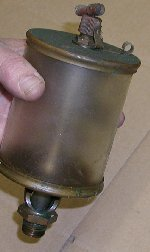
A typical engine oiler. This is one made by Lunkenheimer

When the cover is screwed down tighter, grease is forced out of the bottom of the cup and into the bearing. Some early engines have just a hole in the bearing casting cap where an operator squirts lubricating oil while the engine is running. The piston is lubricated by a drip oiler that continuously feeds drips of oil onto the piston. The excess oil from the piston runs out of the cylinder onto the engine and eventually onto the ground. The drip oiler can be adjusted to drip faster or slower depending on the need for lubrication, dictated by how hard the engine is working. The rest of the moving engine components were all lubricated by oil that the engine operator had to apply periodically while the engine was running.

Virtually all hit-and-miss engines are of the "open crank" style, that is, there is no enclosed crankcase. The crankshaft, connecting rod, camshaft, gears, governor, etc. are all completely exposed and can be viewed in operation when the engine is running. This makes for a messy environment, as oil and sometimes grease are thrown from the engine and run onto the ground. Another disadvantage is that dirt and dust can get on all moving engine parts, causing excessive wear and malfunctions. Frequent cleaning of the engine is therefore required to keep it in proper operating condition.

Cooling of the majority of hit-and-miss engines is by hopper cooling, with water in an open reservoir. There was a small portion of small and fractional horsepower engines that were air-cooled with the aid of an incorporated fan. The water-cooled engine has a built in reservoir (larger engines usually do not have a reservoir and require connection to a large external tank for cooling water via pipe connections on the cylinder). The water reservoir includes the area around the cylinder as well as the cylinder head (most cases) and a tank mounted or cast above the cylinder. When the engine runs, it heats the water. Cooling is accomplished by the water steaming off and removing heat from the engine. When an engine runs under load for a period of time, it is common for the water in the reservoir to boil. Replacement of lost water is needed from time to time. A danger of the water-cooled design is freezing in cold weather. Many engines were ruined when a forgetful operator neglected to drain the water when the engine was not in use, and the water froze and broke the cast iron engine pieces. However, New Holland patented a V-shaped reservoir, so that expanding ice pushed up and into a larger space rather than break the reservoir. Water jacket repairs are common on many of the engines that still exist.

== Design ==
These were simple engines compared to modern engine design. However, they incorporate some innovative designs in several areas, often in an attempt to circumvent patent infringement for a particular component. This is particularly true of the governor. Governors are centrifugal, swinging-arm, pivot-arm, and many others. The actuator mechanism to govern speed is also varied depending on patents existing and the governor used. See, for example, U.S. Patent 543,157 from 1895 or 980,658 from 1911. However accomplished, the governor has one job: to control the speed of the engine. In modern engines, power output is controlled by throttling the flow of the air through the intake by means of a butterfly valve, the only exception to this being in diesels and Valvetronic petrol engines.

=== Operation ===
The intake valve on hit-and-miss engines has no actuator; instead, a light spring holds the intake valve closed unless a vacuum in the cylinder draws it open. This vacuum only occurs if the exhaust valve is closed during the piston's down-stroke. When the hit-and-miss engine is operating above its set speed, the governor holds the exhaust valve open, preventing a vacuum in the cylinder and causing the intake valve to remain closed, thus interrupting the Otto cycle firing mechanism. When the engine is operating at or below its set speed, the governor lets the exhaust valve close. On the next down-stroke, a vacuum in the cylinder opens the intake valve and lets the fuel-air mixture enter. This mechanism prevents fuel consumption during the intake stroke of "miss" cycles.

A video explanation on the workings of a hit and miss engine can be found here

== Usage ==
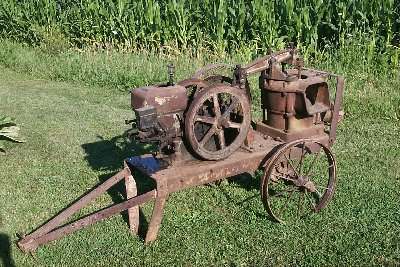
A Jaeger trash pump used for pumping dirty (trashy) water. It has a Hercules 2½ HP (1.9 kW) engine. This is an example of an integrated function of hit-and-miss engines (i.e., not belted)

Hit-and-miss engines produced power outputs from 1 through approximately 100 horsepower (0.75–75 kW). These engines run slowly—typically from 250 revolutions per minute (rpm) for large horsepower engines to 600 rpm for small horsepower engines. They powered pumps for cultivation, saws for cutting wood, generators for electricity in rural areas, farm equipment, and many other stationary applications. Some were mounted on cement mixers. These engines also ran some early washing machines. They were a labor-saving device on farms and helped farmers accomplish much more than they could previously.

The engine was typically belted to the device being powered by a wide, flat belt, typically 2–6 inches (5–15 cm) wide. The flat belt was driven by a pulley on the engine that attached either to a flywheel or to the crankshaft. The pulley was specially made to have a circumference slightly tapered from the middle to each edge (like an over-inflated car tire) so that the middle of the pulley was a slightly larger diameter. This kept the flat belt in the center of the pulley.

== Replacement with throttle-governed engines ==
By the 1930s, more-advanced engines became common. Flywheel engines are extremely heavy for the power produced, and run at very slow speeds. Older engines required a lot of maintenance and were not easily incorporated into mobile applications.

In the late 1920s, International Harvester already had the model M engine, which was an enclosed version of a flywheel engine. Their next step was the model LA, which was a totally enclosed engine (except for the valve system) featuring self-lubrication (oil in the crankcase), reliable spark plug ignition, faster-speed operation (up to about 750-800 RPM), and light in weight compared to earlier generations. While the 1.5-horsepower (1.1 kW) model LA still weighed about 150 pounds (68 kg), it was far lighter than the model M 1½-hp engine, which is in the 300–350 pound (136–159 kg) range. Later, a slightly improved LA, the LB, was produced. The models M, LA, and LB are throttle governed. As time passed, more engine manufacturers moved to the enclosed-crankcase engine. Companies like Briggs & Stratton were also producing lightweight air-cooled engines in the 0.5–2 hp (0.37–1.5 kW) range and used much lighter-weight materials. These engines also run at much higher speeds (up to approximately 2,000–4,000 rpm) and therefore produce more power for a given size than slow flywheel engines.

Most flywheel engine production ceased in the 1940s, but modern engines of this kind remain in use for applications where the low speed is desirable, mostly in oil field applications such as pumpjacks. Maintenance is less of a problem with modern flywheel engines than older ones due to their enclosed crankcases and more advanced materials.

== Preservation ==
Thousands of out-of-use flywheel engines were scrapped in the iron and steel drives of World War II, but many survived and have been restored to working order by enthusiasts. Numerous preserved hit-and-miss engines may be seen in action at shows dedicated to antique engines (which often also have antique tractors), as well as in the stationary engine section of steam fairs, vintage vehicle rallies, and county fairs.

== See also ==
- Bang-bang control
