= Rapillard House =

Historic house in Arkansas, United States

- U.S. National Register of Historic Places
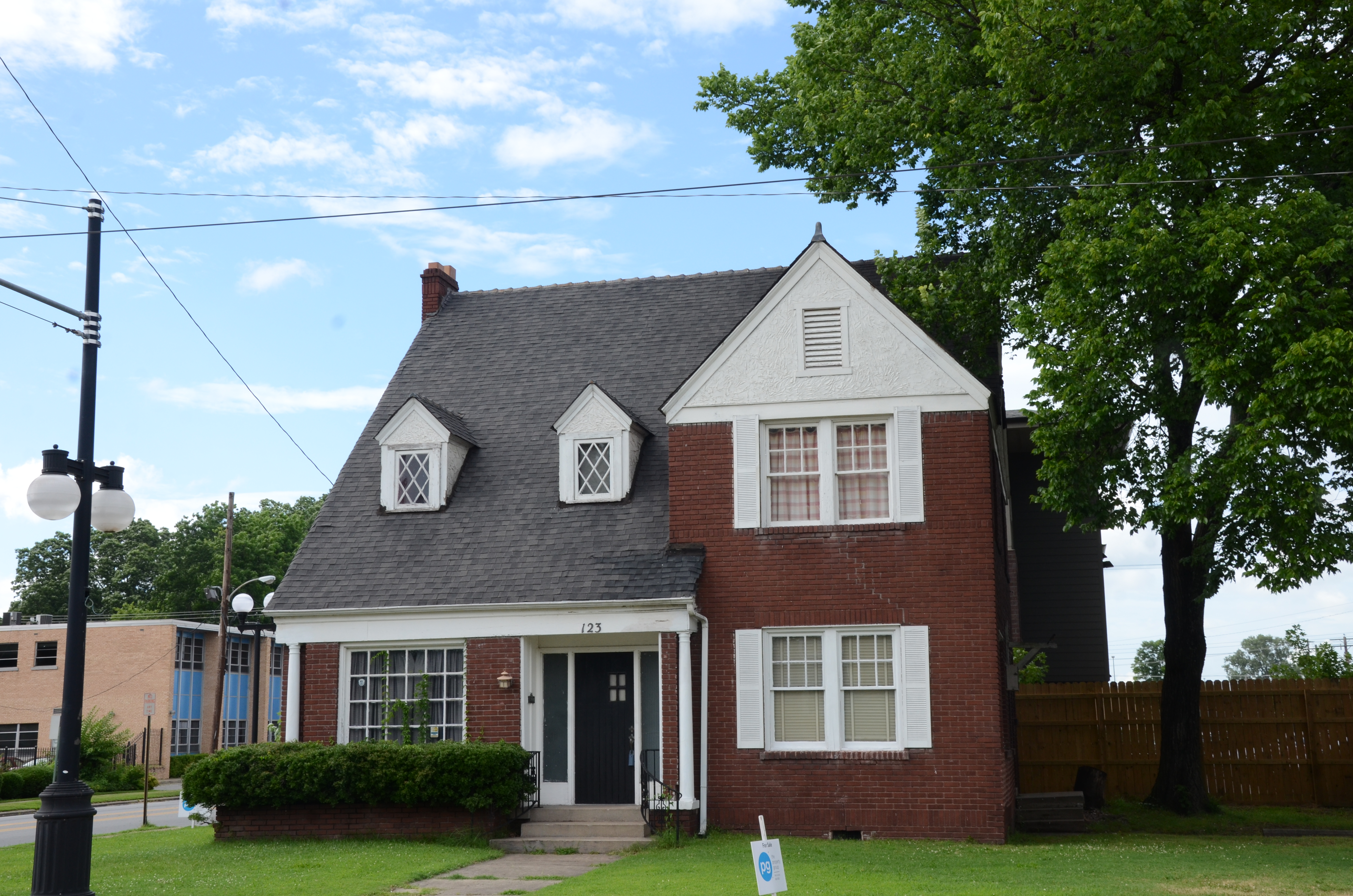

- Location within Arkansas Location within the United States
- Location: 123 W. 7th St., North Little Rock, Arkansas
- Coordinates: 34°45′39″N 92°16′6″W
- Area: less than one acre
- Built: 1927
- Architectural style: English Revival
- NRHP reference No.: 93001249
- Added to NRHP: November 19, 1993

The Rapillard House is a historic house at 123 West 7th Street in North Little Rock, Arkansas. It is a two-story structure, with a steeply pitched gable roof, and an exterior of brick and stucco. A two-story cross-gabled section flanks the entrance on the right, while the roof above the center and left bays is broken by gabled dormers. A porch extends across the left two bays. The house was built in 1927, and is a good local example of vernacular English Revival architecture.

The house was listed on the National Register of Historic Places in 1993.

== See also ==
- National Register of Historic Places listings in Pulaski County, Arkansas
