= Gene Rush House =

Historic house in Arkansas, United States

- U.S. National Register of Historic Places
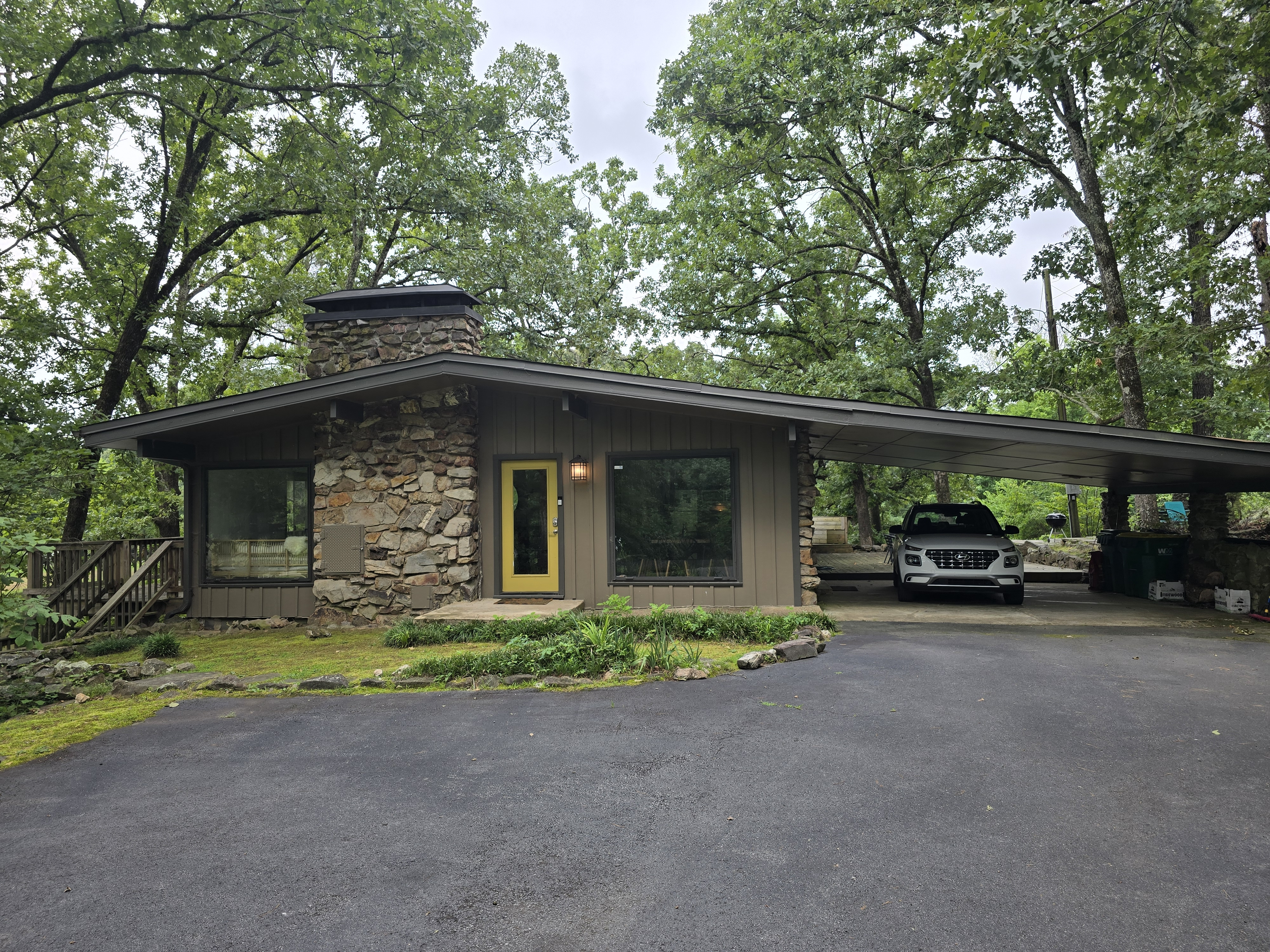
- Gene Rush House

- Location within Arkansas Location within the United States
- Location: 9515 Barrett Rd., Roland, Arkansas
- Coordinates: 34.83877°N 92.52084°W
- Area: 12 acres (4.9 ha)
- Built: c. 1964
- Architectural style: Mid-century modern
- NRHP reference No.: 100003335
- Added to NRHP: January 24, 2019

The Gene Rush House is a historic house at 9515 Barrett Road near Roland, Arkansas. Built around 1964 for Arkansas wildlife biologist Gene Rush, the house is a local example of Mid-century modern residential architecture. The property is located at the entrance to Rattlesnake Ridge Natural Area. It was listed on the National Register of Historic Places in 2019.

== Description ==
The Gene Rush House is a one-story wood-frame residence with a board-and-batten exterior. The house rests on a concrete-block foundation faced in fieldstone. Its architect is unknown.

The house is set back from Barrett Road, with large windows and deck access oriented away from the street. The siting and design emphasized both privacy and a close relationship between the house and its surrounding landscape.

The listed property includes several contributing resources in addition to the house. A barn is located northeast of the residence and includes animal stalls and large double doors. An octagonal aviary, also northeast of the house, rests on a fieldstone foundation and has vertical-board lower walls, glass panes, and a pyramidal metal roof. The property also includes a kidney-shaped man-made pond and levee, as well as stone gateposts and fencing at the Barrett Road entrance.

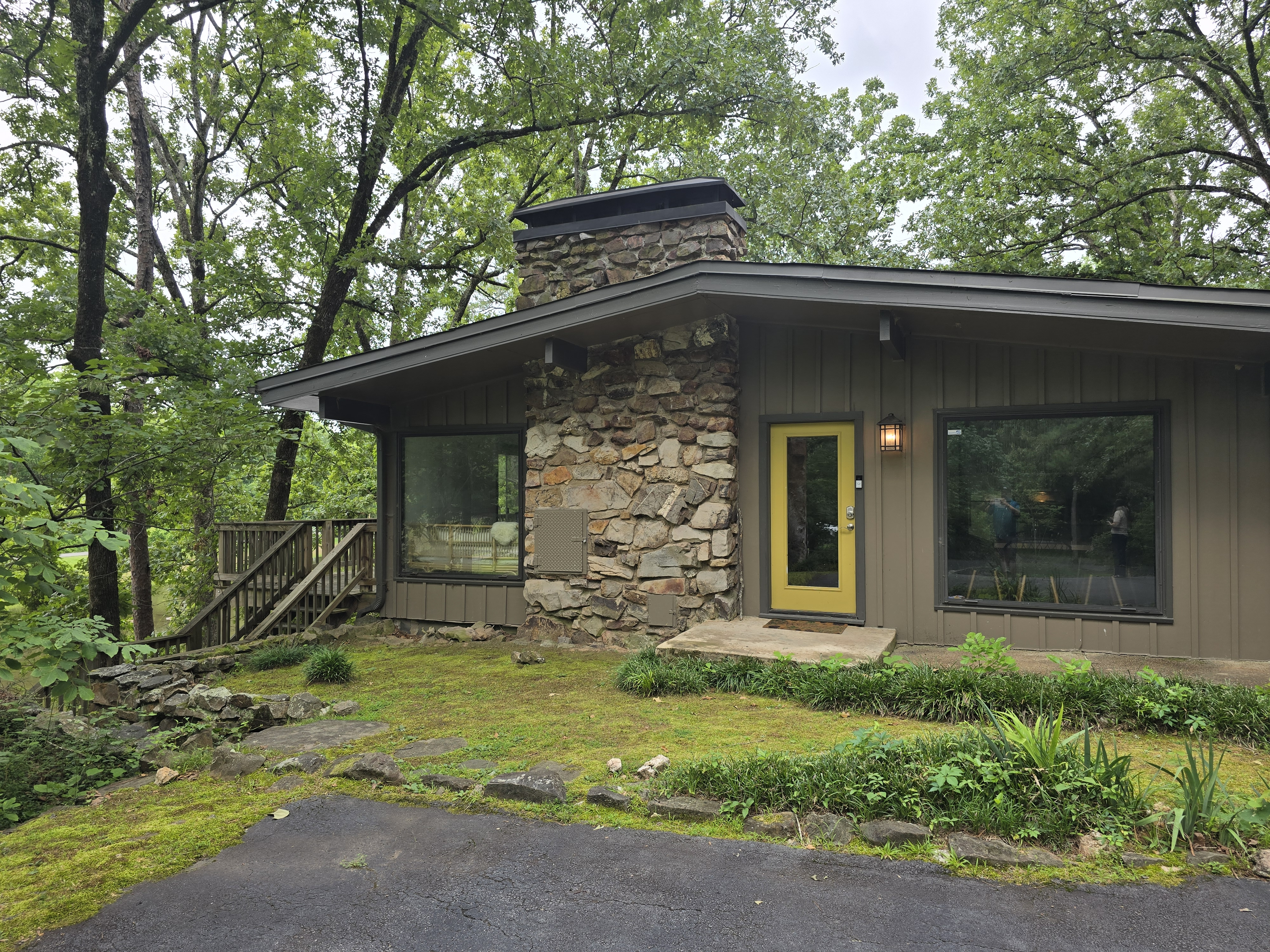
Another view of the Gene Rush House

== Architecture and significance ==
The Gene Rush House was nominated to the National Register under Criterion C for its local architectural significance as an example of Mid-century modern residential design. The house reflects post-World War II changes in American residential architecture, when decorative revival styles increasingly gave way to more functional designs.

The house lacks applied ornamentation and instead uses window placement, exterior material variation, and its relationship to the landscape as major design elements. Preservation staff noted that the house reflected design trends associated with the Mid-century modern style, including minimal decorative detailing, the use of wood and stone, and an increased connection between indoor and outdoor living spaces.

The placement of large windows away from the road also reflected a concern for residential privacy while still allowing views of the surrounding natural setting.

== Gene Rush ==
Gene Rush was a wildlife biologist and longtime employee of the Arkansas Game and Fish Commission. According to the Arkansas Game and Fish Foundation, Rush participated in the restoration of Arkansas deer, bear, and turkey populations and, as wildlife chief, supported the acquisition of land for state wildlife management areas.

Arkansas' black bear restoration program took place from 1958 to 1968. The Arkansas Game and Fish Commission describes the effort as a major restoration success, noting that black bears had been nearly eliminated from the state by the 1930s and later recovered to a population of more than 5,000.

The Gene Rush Wildlife Management Area was renamed in his honor. The Arkansas Game and Fish Commission describes Rush as a native of Newton County, a longtime agency employee, and a former chief of the AGFC Wildlife Management Division.

== Rattlesnake Ridge Natural Area ==
The house is located at 9515 Barrett Road, the physical address listed for Rattlesnake Ridge Natural Area. The natural area is a 373-acre (151 ha) preserve in Pulaski County, just west of Pinnacle Mountain State Park. It was added to the Arkansas System of Natural Areas in 2018.

Rattlesnake Ridge Natural Area protects rare plant and animal habitat in the eastern Ouachita Mountains. The Arkansas Natural Heritage Commission identifies the area as part of the Ouachita Mountains division and describes the ridge as the watershed divide between the Big Maumelle and Little Maumelle rivers. The natural area includes the Ouachita Mountain Sandstone Outcrop Barrens natural community and provides habitat for species of state conservation concern, including the southeastern bat, western diamondback rattlesnake, and Wright's cliffbrake.

The ridge rises to about 920 feet (280 m) above sea level and is described by the Arkansas Natural Heritage Commission as one of the more prominent rocky summits in the eastern Ouachita Mountains. The trail system at the natural area is open to hiking and biking, though the Arkansas Natural Heritage Commission notes that the trails vary in length and difficulty and are not ADA accessible.

== Current use ==
The Nature Conservancy identifies the Rattlesnake Ridge House as a restored Mid-century modern home located within Rattlesnake Ridge Natural Area, approximately 15 miles (24 km) northwest of Little Rock.

== See also ==
- National Register of Historic Places listings in Pulaski County, Arkansas
- Pinnacle Mountain State Park
