= Hanger Cotton Gin =

- U.S. National Register of Historic Places
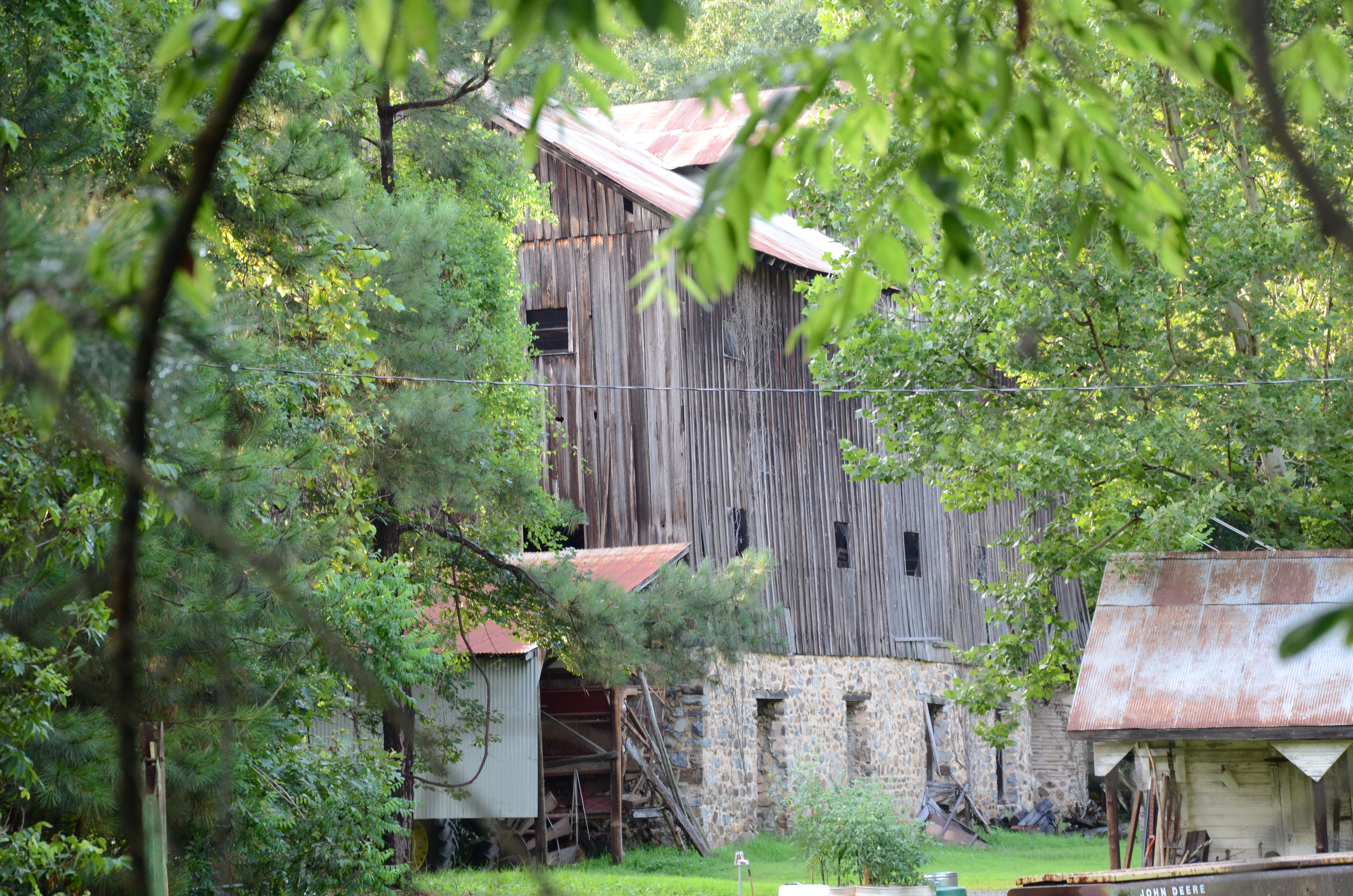

- Location within Arkansas Location within the United States
- Location: Harper Rd. and Gates Lane, Sweet Home, Arkansas
- Coordinates: 34°41′11″N 92°14′12″W
- Area: less than one acre
- Built: 1876
- Built by: Peter Hanger
- NRHP reference No.: 76000463
- Added to NRHP: October 8, 1976

The Hanger Cotton Gin is a historic cotton gin in Sweet Home, Arkansas. Built about 1876, it is a rare surviving example of a steam-powered gin. The main building is a three-story frame structure covered in board-and-batten siding. The gin was only operated commercially for a brief period, and was out of service by 1892. Since then, the building has been used as a barn and grain storage facility. It was probably built by Peter Hanger, whose family has been prominent in the Little Rock business community since that time.

The gin was listed on the National Register of Historic Places in 1976.

== See also ==
- National Register of Historic Places listings in Pulaski County, Arkansas
