= Jacksonville Commercial Historic District =

Historic district in Arkansas, United States

- U.S. National Register of Historic Places
- U.S. Historic district
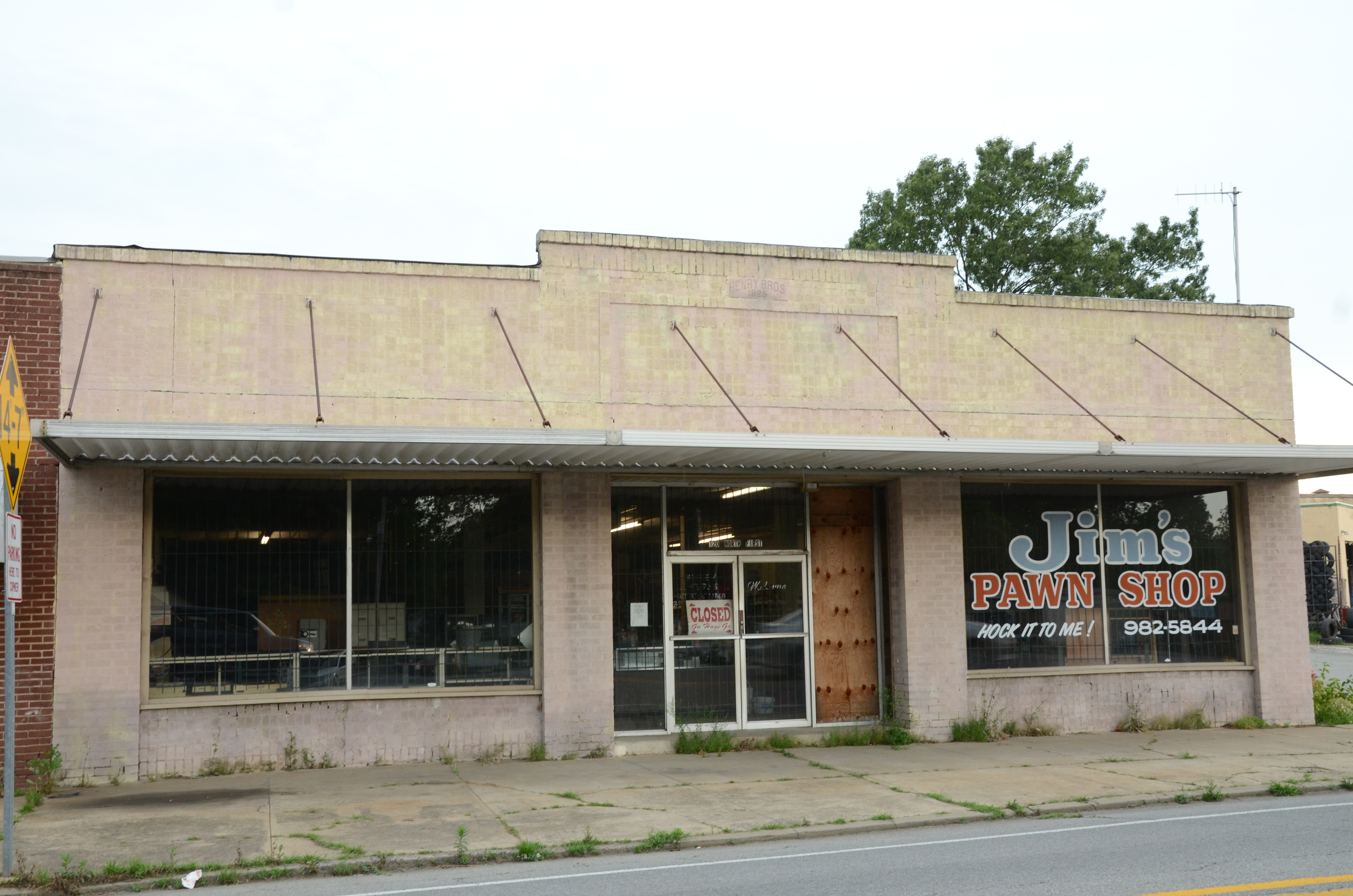

- Location within Arkansas Location within the United States
- Location: 1st from Mulberry to W. Hickory Sts., Jacksonville, Arkansas
- Coordinates: 34°51′57″N 92°6′39″W
- Area: 3 acres (1.2 ha)
- NRHP reference No.: 15000631
- Added to NRHP: February 8, 2016

The Jacksonville Commercial Historic District encompasses a 1-1/2 block section of 1st Street in Jacksonville, Arkansas, between Main Street and 2nd Street. The area contains six commercial buildings, constructed between 1925 and 1962, a period when the railroad was an important element of the city's growth. (The railroad tracks lie across 1st Street from the commercial strip. The buildings are mostly single-story brick or stucco buildings with vernacular style.

The district was listed on the National Register of Historic Places in 2016.

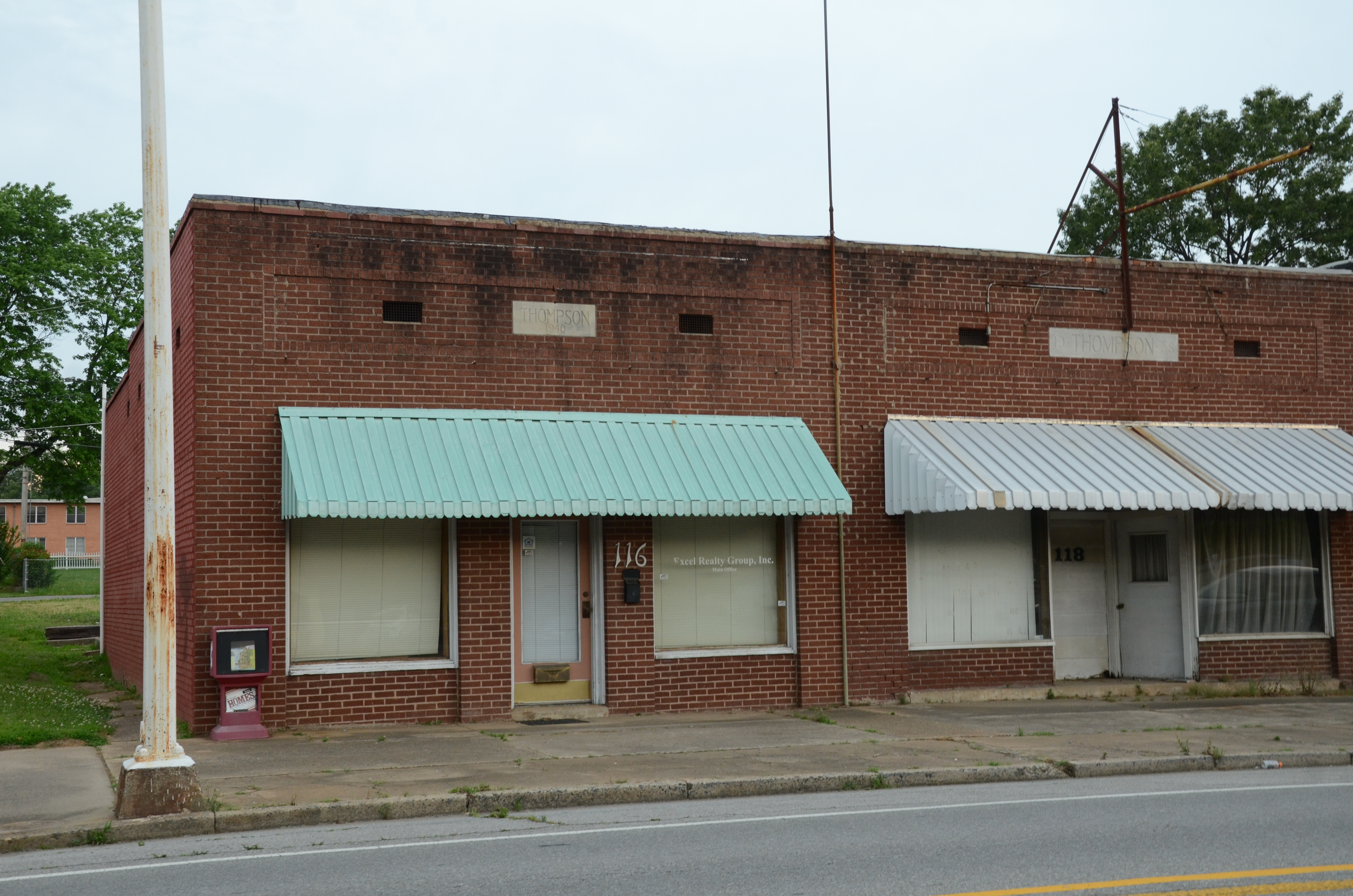

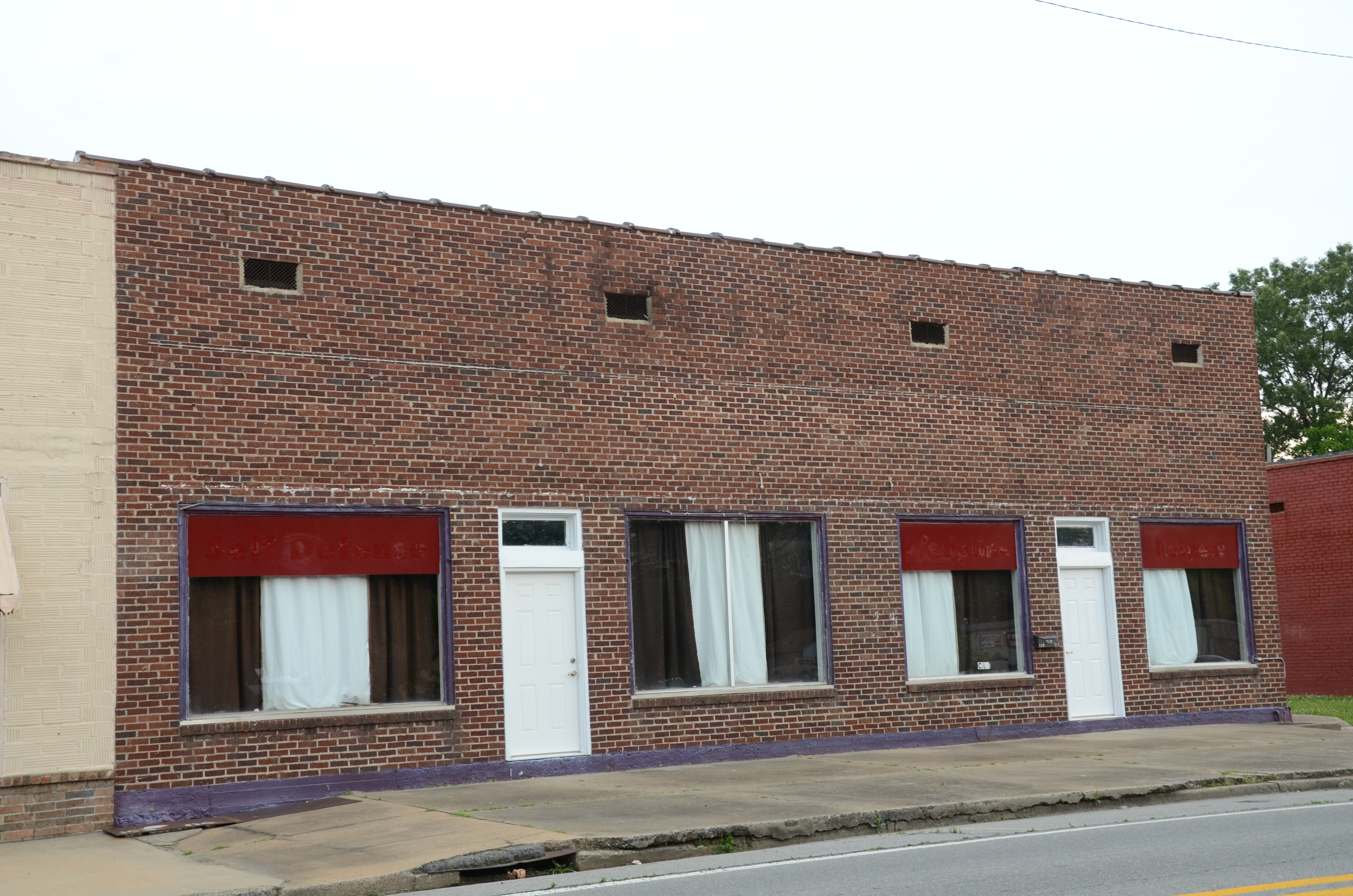

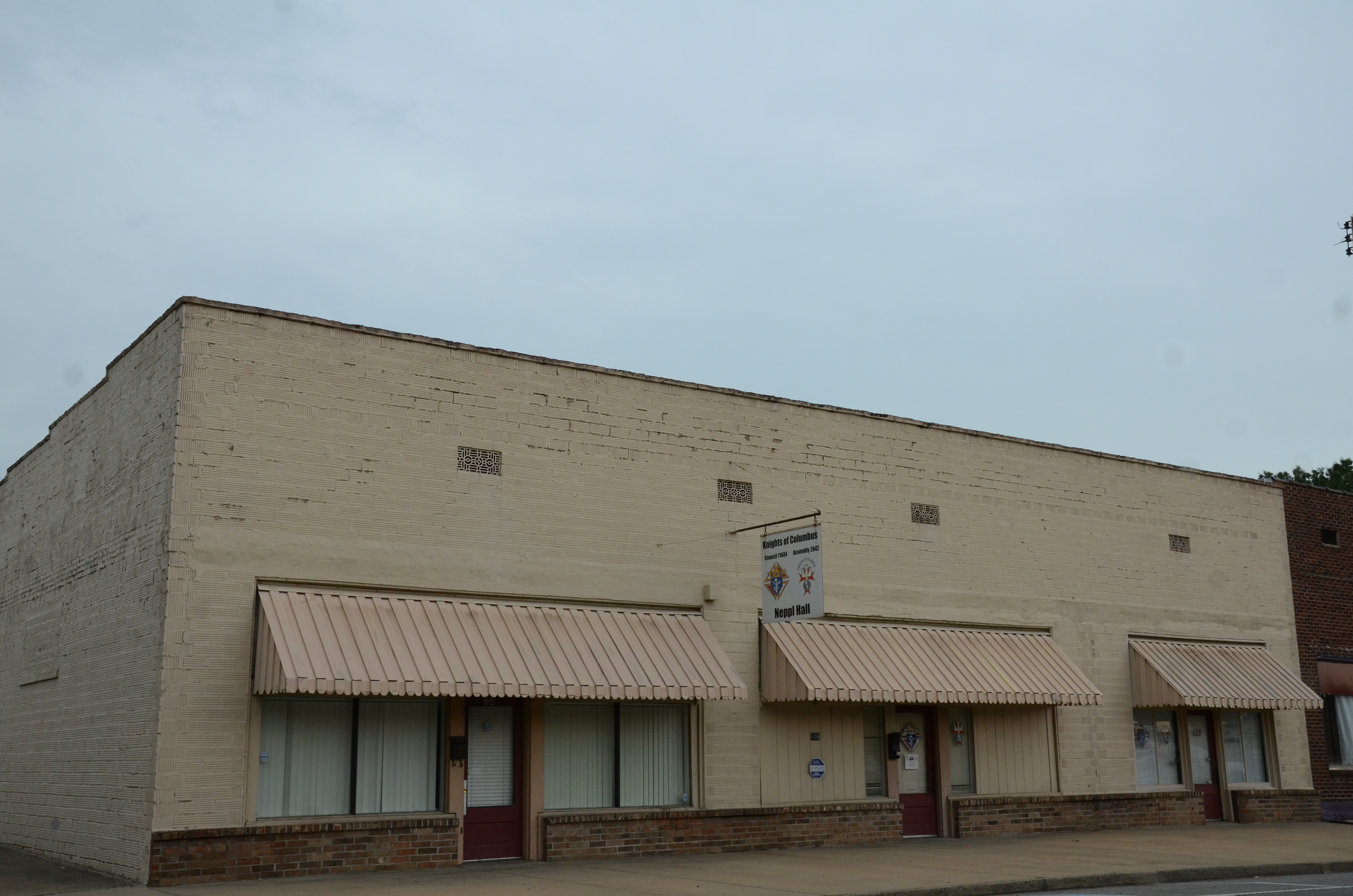

== See also ==
- National Register of Historic Places listings in Pulaski County, Arkansas
