= West-Blazer House =

Historic house in Arkansas, United States

- U.S. National Register of Historic Places
- Location within Arkansas Location within the United States
- Location: 8107 Peters Rd., northeast of Jacksonville, Arkansas
- Coordinates: 34°56′24″N 92°5′24″W
- Area: 8.1 acres (3.3 ha)
- Built: 1920
- Architectural style: Plain Traditional
- NRHP reference No.: 100001652
- Added to NRHP: September 21, 2017

The West-Blazer House is a historic house at 8107 Peters Road, in rural Pulaski County, Arkansas northeast of Jacksonville. It is a single story frame structure, with a weatherboard exterior and hip roof. A porch adorned with Folk Victorian trim elements extends across its front and around the side. Built in 1912, it is one of the only surviving period buildings of the community of Ebenezer, a thriving rural community that once had a church, school, and businesses.

The house was listed on the National Register of Historic Places in 2017.

== See also ==
- National Register of Historic Places listings in Pulaski County, Arkansas
