= Kleiber House =

Historic house in Arkansas, United States

- U.S. National Register of Historic Places
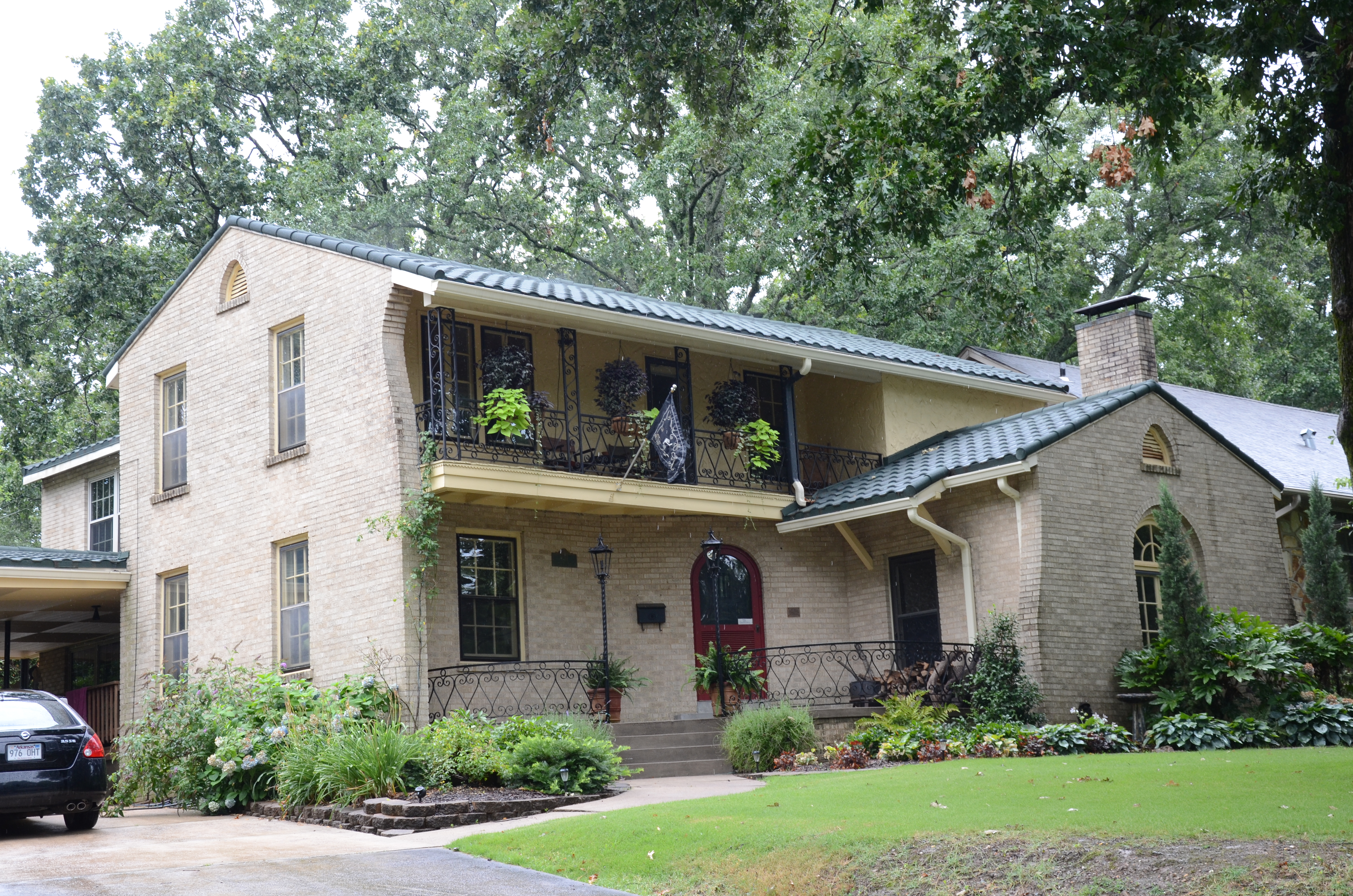

- Location within Arkansas Location within the United States
- Location: 637 Skyline Dr., North Little Rock, Arkansas
- Coordinates: 34°46′55″N 92°15′16″W
- Area: less than one acre
- Built: 1929
- Architect: Frank Carmean, et al.
- Architectural style: Late 19th And 20th Century Revivals, Monterey
- MPS: Pre-Depression Houses and Outbuildings of Edgemont in Park Hill MPS
- NRHP reference No.: 92000561
- Added to NRHP: June 1, 1992

The Kleiber House is a historic house at 637 Skyline Drive in North Little Rock, Arkansas. It is a two-story frame house, finished in a buff brick veneer. Its most prominent exterior feature is a two-story porch, with wrought iron railings, and a brick extension of the side wall that curves to support the main roof as it overhangs the porch. The house was built in 1929 on speculation as part of Justin Mathews' Edgement development. Its first owner, Victor Kleiber, lost it to foreclosure during the Great Depression.

The house was listed on the National Register of Historic Places in 1992 for its unusual architecture, which is not seen elsewhere in the Edgemont area.

== See also ==
- National Register of Historic Places listings in Pulaski County, Arkansas
