= St. Joseph's Home =

- U.S. National Register of Historic Places
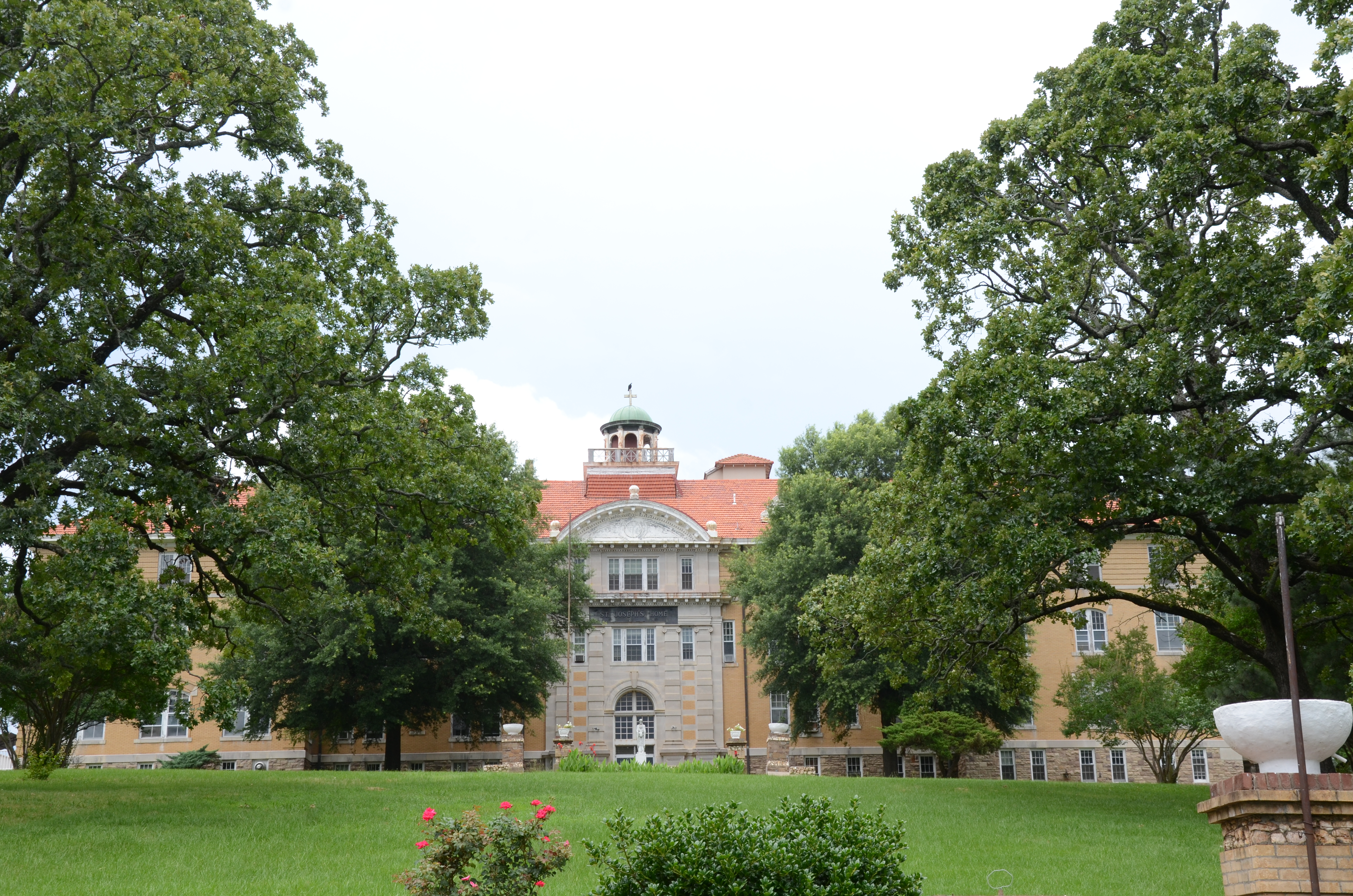

- Location within Arkansas Location within the United States
- Location: Camp Robinson Rd. off AR 176, North Little Rock, Arkansas
- Coordinates: 34°48′59″N 92°16′17″W
- Area: less than one acre
- Built: 1908
- NRHP reference No.: 76000462
- Added to NRHP: May 4, 1976

St. Joseph's Home is a historic Roman Catholic orphanage on Camp Robinson Road in North Little Rock, Arkansas. It is a large three-story brick building, with a tile hip roof and a stone foundation. The roof is topped by a cupola with a cross as a spire. The building is roughly H-shaped, with projecting wings on either side of central section. It has eighty bedrooms. It was built in 1910 by the Roman Catholic Diocese of Little Rock.

The facility was listed on the National Register of Historic Places in 1976.

== See also ==
- National Register of Historic Places listings in Pulaski County, Arkansas
