= Engelberger House =

Historic house in Arkansas, United States

- U.S. National Register of Historic Places
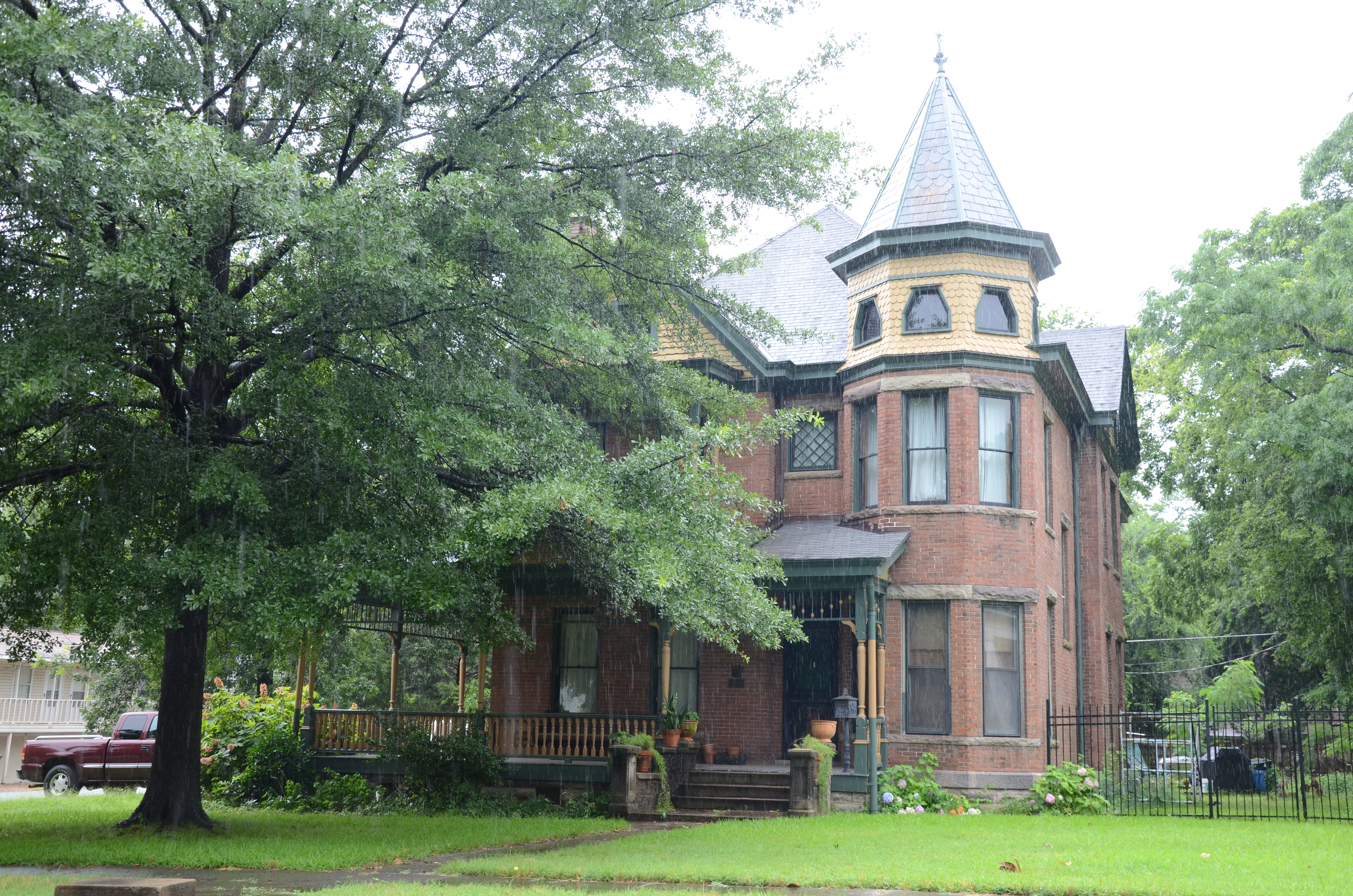

- Location within Arkansas Location within the United States
- Location: 2105 N. Maple St., North Little Rock, Arkansas
- Coordinates: 34°46′28″N 92°16′6″W
- Area: less than one acre
- Architectural style: Queen Anne
- NRHP reference No.: 90000895
- Added to NRHP: June 14, 1990

The Engelberger House is a historic house at 2105 North Maple Street in North Little Rock, Arkansas. It is a two-story wood-frame structure, with a hip roof and asymmetrical massing characteristic of the Queen Anne style of architecture. It has several projecting gable sections, an octagonal tower at one corner, and a porch that wraps around two sides. It was built in 1895 by Alonzo "Lonnie" Clayton, an African American jockey and the youngest to win the Kentucky Derby. Lonnie was 15 years old when he won the Kentucky Derby in 1892. The Engelberger House is one of only two high-style Queen Anne houses in the city (the other is the Baker House).

The house was listed on the National Register of Historic Places in 1990.

== See also ==
- National Register of Historic Places listings in Pulaski County, Arkansas
