= George D.D. Huie Grocery Store Building =

- U.S. National Register of Historic Places
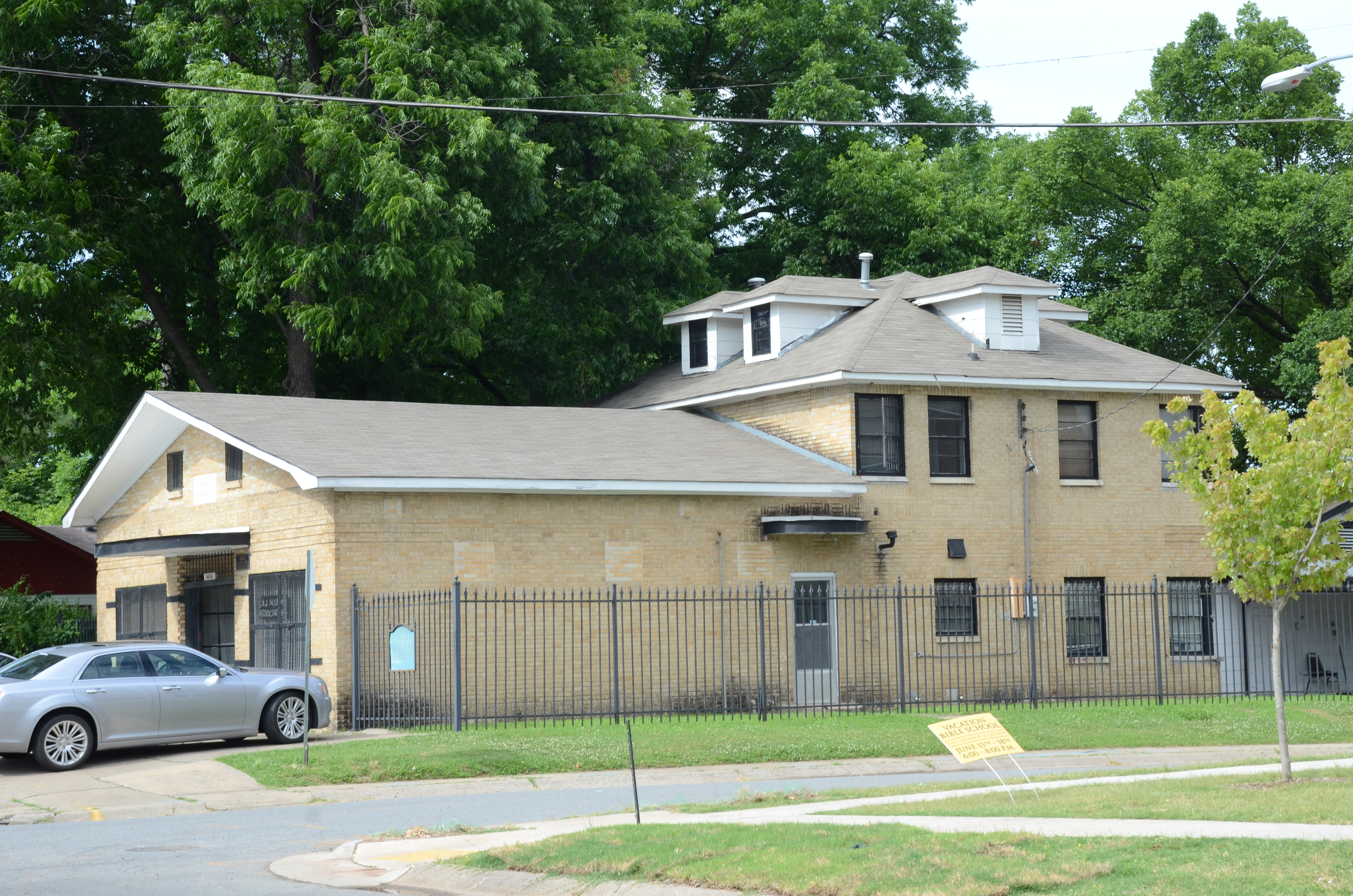

- Location within Arkansas Location within the United States
- Location: 1400 N. Pine St., North Little Rock, Arkansas
- Area: Less than one acre
- NRHP reference No.: 04001504
- Added to NRHP: January 20, 2005

The George D.D. Huie Grocery Store Building is a historic commercial building at 1400 North Pine Street in North Little Rock, Arkansas. It has a single-story front section with a gable roof, which housed the retail space, with a two-story rear section used as the proprietor's residence. This buff brick building was built by George Huie, a Chinese immigrant, in 1949 on the site of a store he had operated since 1938. The store is historically important for its role in the growth and development of the local Chinese community, and for its service to the historically African-American neighborhood in which it stands. It presently houses a small museum.

The building was listed on the National Register of Historic Places in 2005.

== See also ==
- National Register of Historic Places listings in Pulaski County, Arkansas
