= East End Methodist Episcopal Church =

Historic church in Arkansas, United States

- U.S. National Register of Historic Places
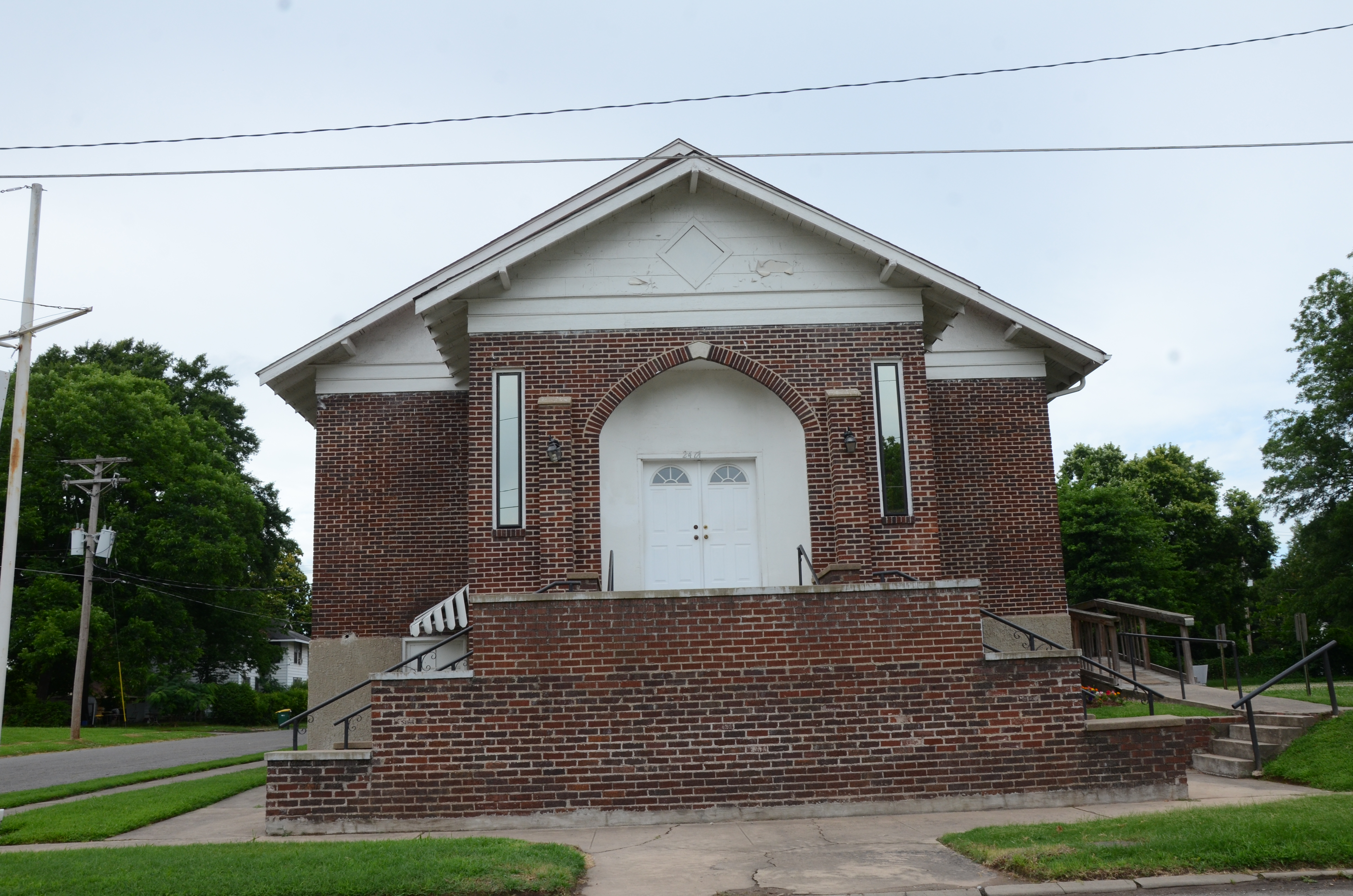

- Location within Arkansas Location within the United States
- Location: 2401 E. Washington Ave., North Little Rock, Arkansas
- Coordinates: 34°45′13″N 92°14′25″W
- Area: less than one acre
- Built: 1923
- Built by: J.J. Miller, Rollo Miller
- Architectural style: Bungalow/craftsman
- NRHP reference No.: 08001038
- Added to NRHP: November 12, 2008

The East End Methodist Episcopal Church (East Washington Avenue Methodist Church; Damascus Spiritual Church) is a historic church at 2401 E. Washington Avenue in North Little Rock, Arkansas. It is a single-story brick structure, with a broad gable roof and a porch extending across part of its front facade. It was built in 1922 for a congregation founded in 1915, and is a fine local example of vernacular Craftsman architecture.

The building was listed on the National Register of Historic Places in 2008.

== See also ==
- National Register of Historic Places listings in Pulaski County, Arkansas
