= Arkansas II =

- U.S. National Register of Historic Places
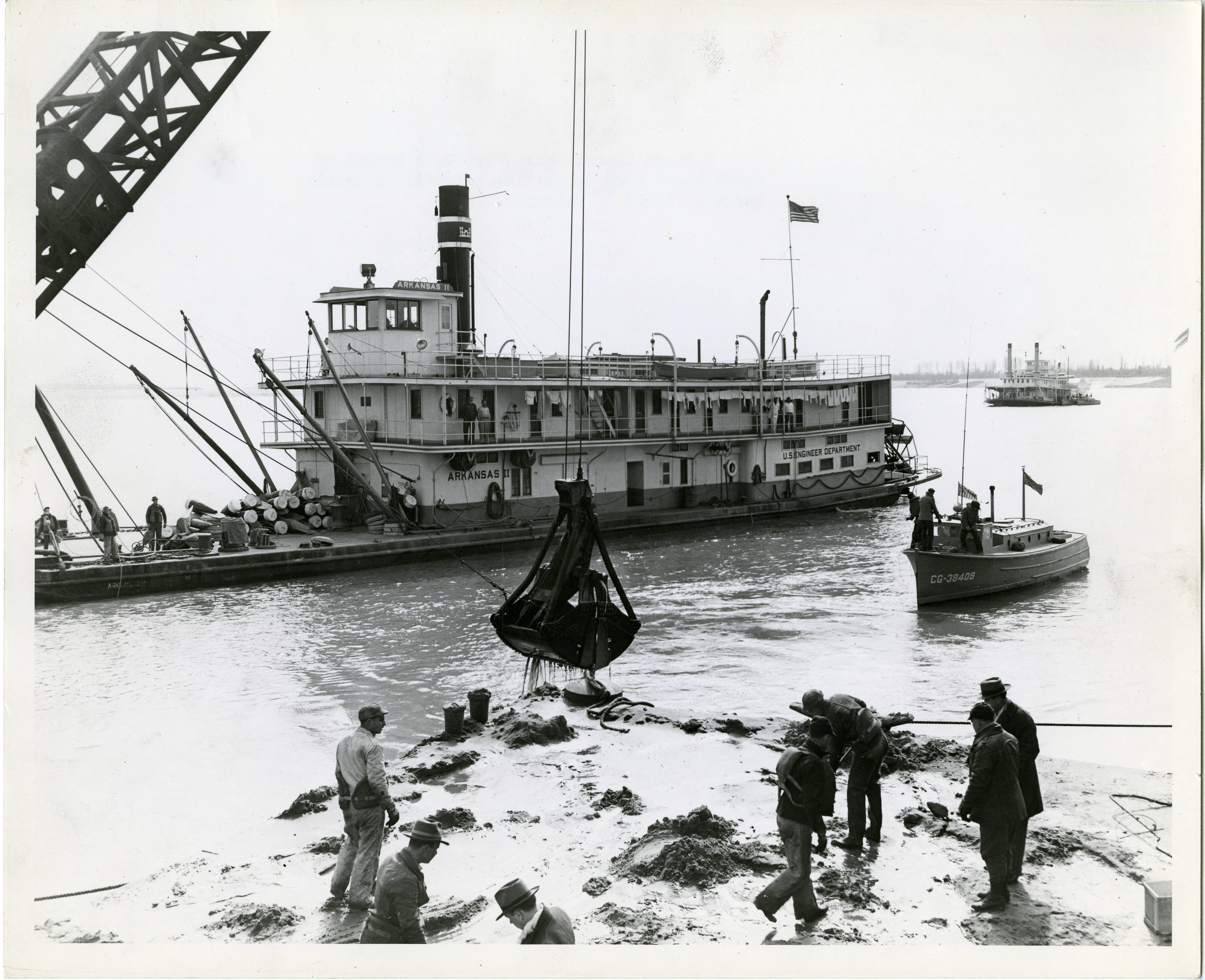
- Arkansas II in 1944

- Location within Arkansas Location within the United States
- Location: S end of Locust St. on David D. Terry Lake, North Little Rock, Arkansas
- Coordinates: 34°45′5″N 92°15′41″W
- Area: less than one acre
- Built by: Army Corps of Engineers
- Architectural style: Steel-hulled stern-wheeler
- NRHP reference No.: 90000899
- Added to NRHP: June 14, 1990

Arkansas II is a historic snagboat, berthed on the Arkansas River in North Little Rock, Arkansas. She is a steel-hulled sternwheeler, with two decks. The lower deck has a steel-frame cabin, while that on the second deck is wood-frame. A wood-frame pilot house rises above the second deck. The paddlewheel has a steel frame and wooden buckets. The vehicle is utilitarian in appearance, lacking significant decoration. The hull was built in 1939-40 by the Bethlehem Steel Corporation, and it was outfitted at the Ensley Bottoms shipyard of the United States Army Corps of Engineers (USACE) at Memphis, Tennessee. It is believed to be the last steam-powered paddle-wheeler built by the USACE.

The boat was listed on the National Register of Historic Places in 1990.

== See also ==
- National Register of Historic Places listings in Pulaski County, Arkansas
