= McKenzie House (Scott, Arkansas) =

Historic house in Arkansas, United States

- U.S. National Register of Historic Places
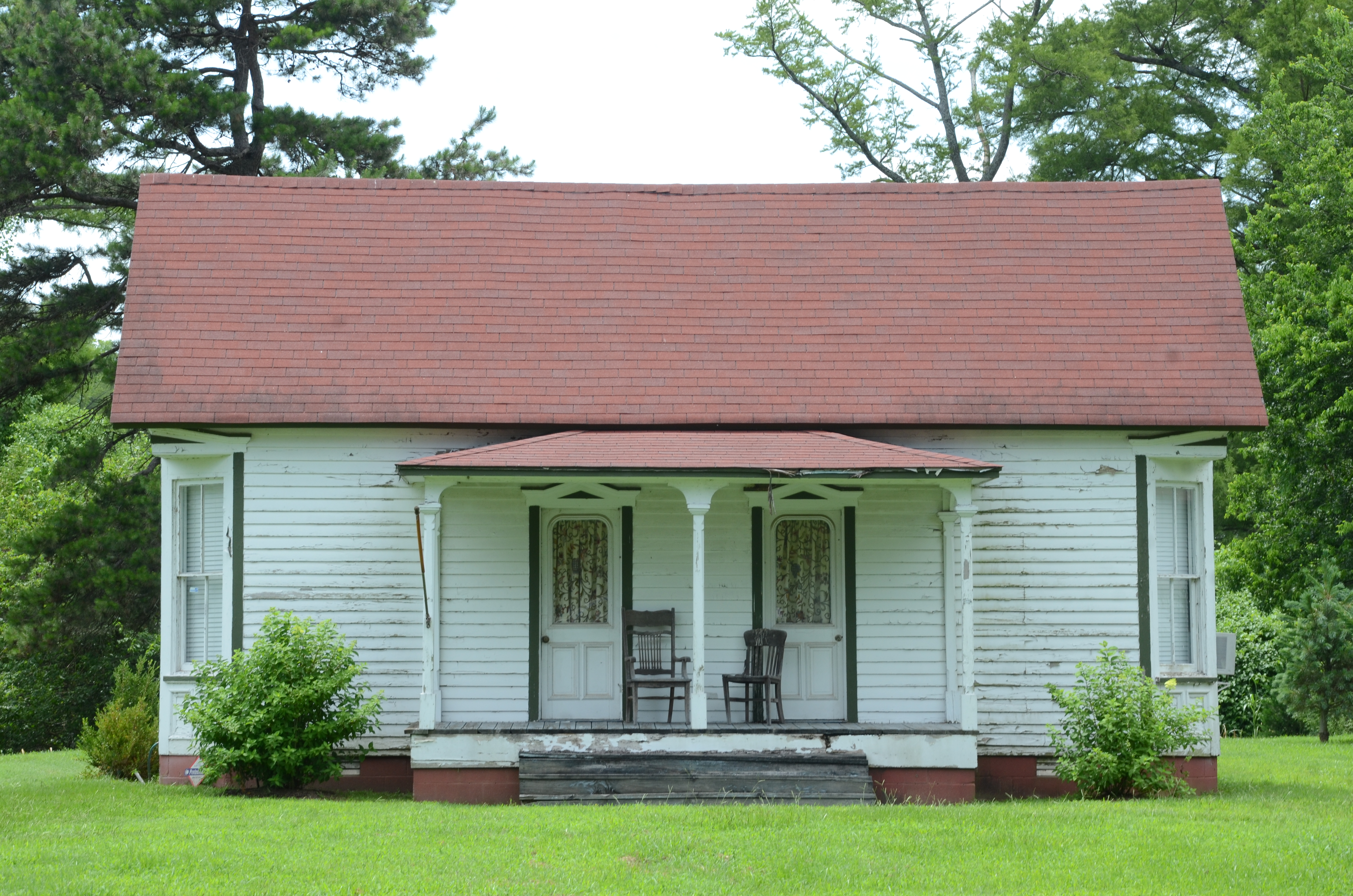

- Location within Arkansas Location within the United States
- Location: 4911 AR 161, Scott, Arkansas
- Coordinates: 34°41′40″N 92°05′49″W
- Area: less than one acre
- Built by: C. E. McKenzie
- Architectural style: Italianate, Plain Traditional
- NRHP reference No.: 92000105
- Added to NRHP: March 5, 1992

The McKenzie House is a historic house at 4911 Arkansas Highway 161 in Scott, Arkansas. It is a modest single-story wood-frame structure, with a side gable roof, weatherboard siding, and a concrete block foundation. It has vernacular Italianate features, including windows in beveled corner window bays, and gablets over a pair of symmetrically placed entrances. It was built c. 1868–75, and is the only known example of Italianate architecture in Scott.

The house was listed on the National Register of Historic Places in 1992.

== See also ==
- National Register of Historic Places listings in Pulaski County, Arkansas
