= Duffy House =

Historic house in Arkansas, United States

- U.S. National Register of Historic Places
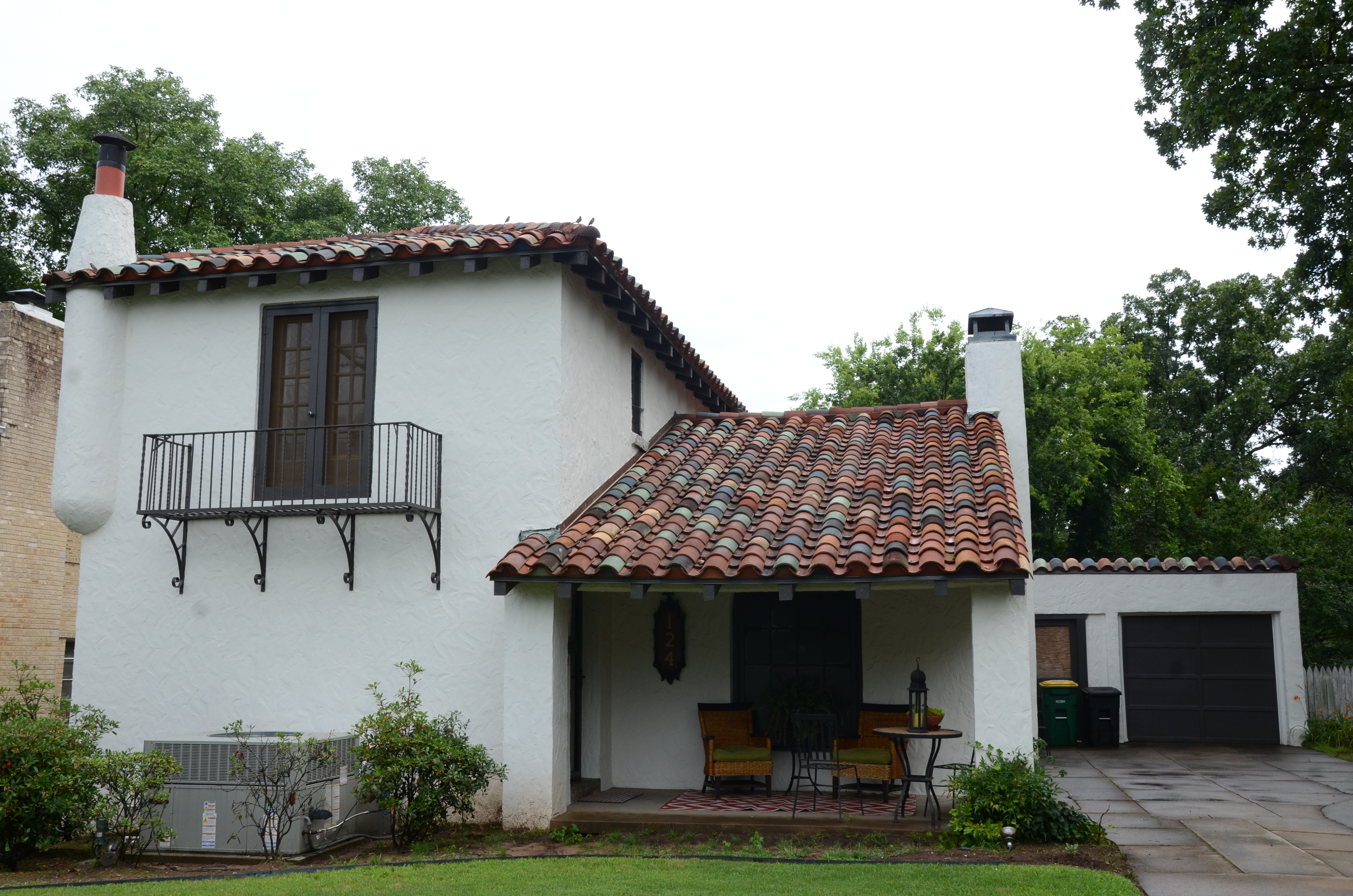

- Location within Arkansas Location within the United States
- Location: 124 E. A St., North Little Rock, Arkansas
- Coordinates: 34°46′58″N 92°15′34″W
- Area: less than one acre
- Built: 1929
- Built by: Justin Stewart
- Architectural style: Mediterranean Revival
- NRHP reference No.: 14000793
- Added to NRHP: September 29, 2014

The Duffy House is a historic house at 124 East "A" Street in North Little Rock, Arkansas. It is a two-story stuccoed structure with a tile roof in the Spanish Colonial style, with a single-story addition to the west, and a garage to the southwest, with a small attached maid's quarters. The house was built in 1929 by Justin Stewart as part of a large subdivision. Due to the effects of the Great Depression, it remained unsold for several years, and typifies the houses built in the subdivision before the 1929 stock market crash.

The house was listed on the National Register of Historic Places in 2014.

== See also ==
- National Register of Historic Places listings in Pulaski County, Arkansas
