= Pruniski House =

Historic house in Arkansas, United States

- U.S. National Register of Historic Places
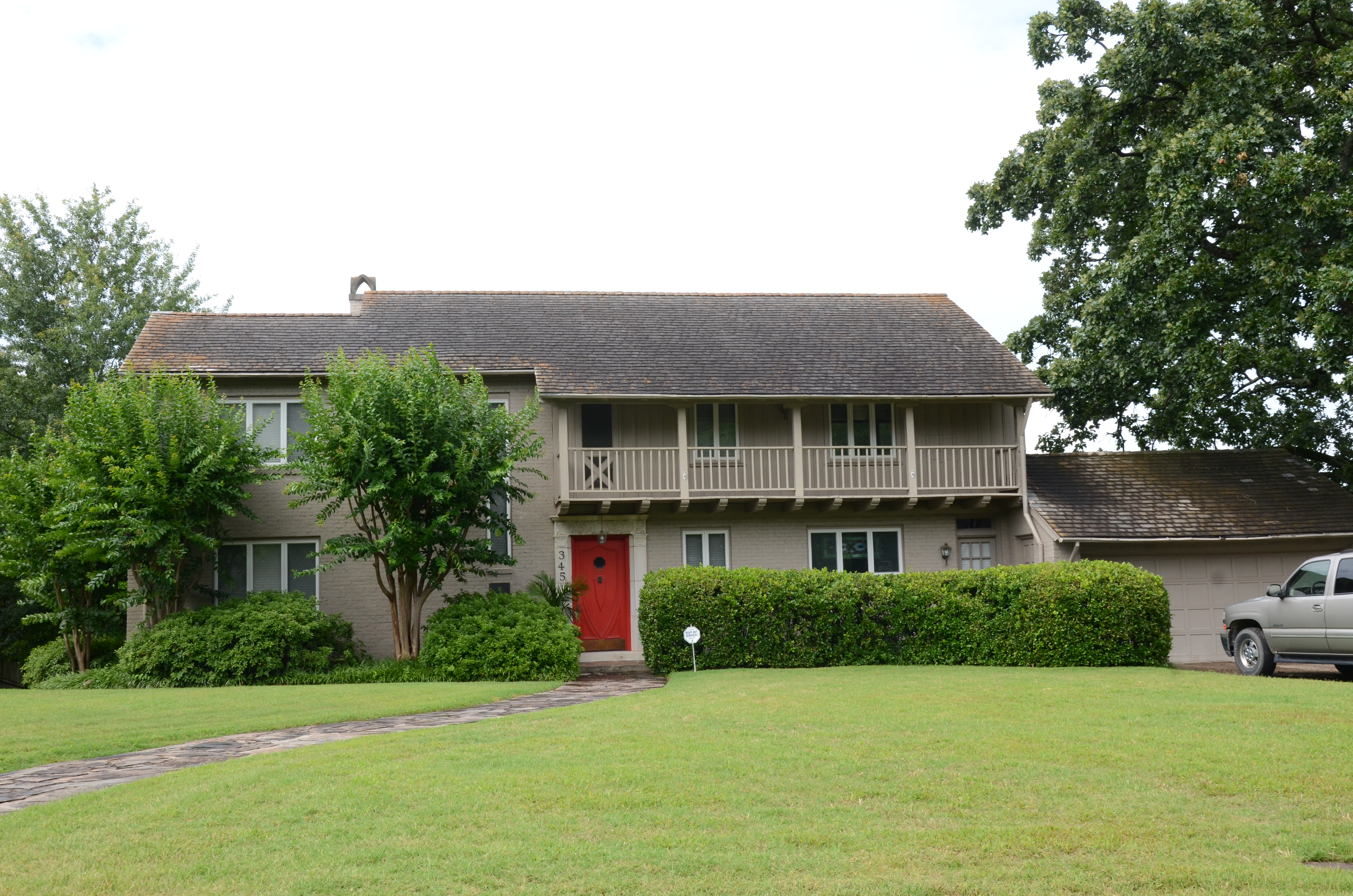

- Location within Arkansas Location within the United States
- Location: 345 Goshen Ave., North Little Rock, Arkansas
- Coordinates: 34°47′7″N 92°15′12″W
- Area: less than one acre
- Built: 1937
- Architect: Brueggeman, Swaim & Allen
- Architectural style: Late 19th And 20th Century Revivals; Monterey style
- NRHP reference No.: 90000116
- Added to NRHP: February 9, 1990

The Pruniski House is a historic house at 345 Goshen Avenue in North Little Rock, Arkansas. Built in 1937, it is a remarkably forward-looking house design, presaging a number of features not generally found in residential construction until after World War II. It is a two-story wood-frame house with an attached two-car garage, a patio in the back yard, and a basement family room. The exterior is stylistically a revival of the Monterey style of architecture.

The house was built by Max Pruniski, and he and his three daughters lived there. Max's wife had died in 1915 when their three daughters were all infants. After all three daughters, Marie, Bettye, and Philomena, married Marie and her husband Tom Morrissey continued to live in the house with her dad. They had two sons who also lived there. Max died in 1963 and shortly thereafter the house was sold.

The house was listed on the National Register of Historic Places in 1990.

== See also ==
- National Register of Historic Places listings in Pulaski County, Arkansas
