= Palarm Bayou Pioneer Cemetery =

Historic Cemetery in Pulaski County, Arkansas, US

- U.S. National Register of Historic Places
- Location within Arkansas Location within the United States
- Nearest city: Morgan, Arkansas
- Coordinates: 34°54′1″N 92°26′23″W
- Area: less than one acre
- NRHP reference No.: 04001491
- Added to NRHP: January 20, 2005

The Palarm Bayou Pioneer Cemetery is a historic cemetery in a rural-suburban area of northern Pulaski County, Arkansas. It is located northwest of Maumelle, between the Arkansas River Trail (Arkansas Highway 365) and Palarm Creek, on a rise that is now part of the gated Mountain Crest residential subdivision. The small cemetery, with just ten marked graves, stands at the top of a rise north of Mt. Pilgrim Baptist Church. Nine of the graves are surrounded by a low stone wall, while one is set outside that enclosure, surrounded by a wrought iron fence. The oldest of the marked graves is that of Daniel Wilson, who died in 1837. The cemetery is probably one of the county's oldest.

The cemetery was listed on the National Register of Historic Places in 2005. It contains the graves of early pioneer families; Wilson, Danley, and Boyle. The cemetery is severely neglected with broken headstones and overgrowth of the surrounding woodlands.

== See also ==
- National Register of Historic Places listings in Pulaski County, Arkansas
