= Howell-Garner-Monfee House =

Historic house in Arkansas, United States

- U.S. National Register of Historic Places
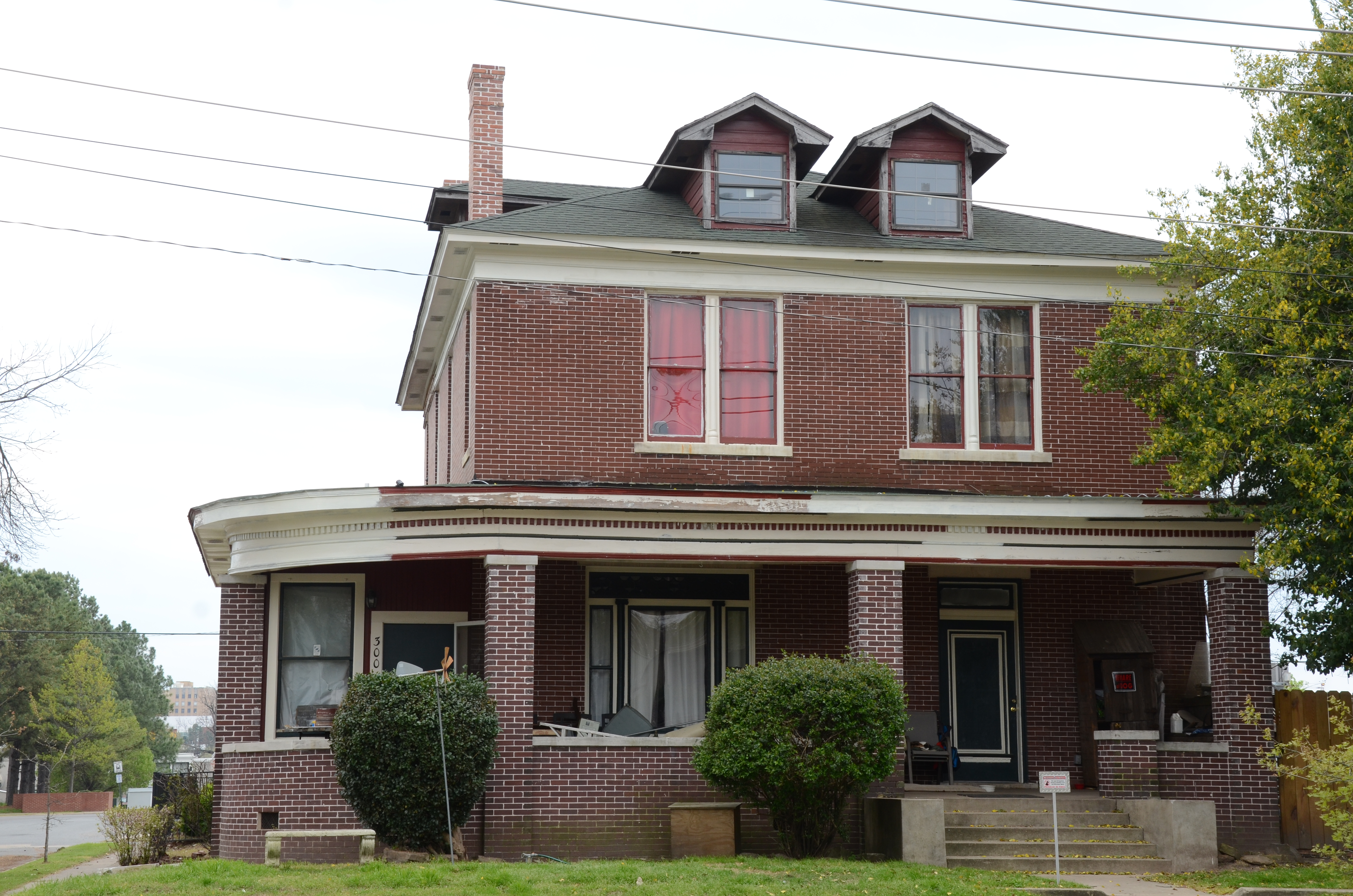

- Location within Arkansas Location within the United States
- Location: 300 W. 4th St., North Little Rock, Arkansas
- Coordinates: 34°45′25″N 92°16′13″W
- Area: less than one acre
- Built: 1906
- NRHP reference No.: 78000630
- Added to NRHP: January 4, 1978

The Howell-Garner-Monfee House is a historic house at 300 West Fourth Street in North Little Rock, Arkansas. It is a 2 1/2-story brick structure, with a wide gable roof pierced by gabled dormers. A single-story porch wraps around the east and north sides, with brick posts and a dentil course in the eave. The main entrance is flanked by pilasters and sidelights, with a distinctive transom window that has semi-circular sections joined by a straight section. Built in 1906, it is one of the best-preserved examples of housing built in the city's most fashionable neighborhood of that period.

The house was listed on the National Register of Historic Places in 1978.

== See also ==
- National Register of Historic Places listings in Pulaski County, Arkansas
