= National Register of Historic Places listings in Pulaski County, Arkansas =

Location of Pulaski County in Arkansas

This is a list of the National Register of Historic Places listings in Pulaski County, Arkansas.

This is intended to be a complete list of the properties and districts on the National Register of Historic Places in Pulaski County, Arkansas, United States. The locations of National Register properties and districts for which the latitude and longitude coordinates are included below, may be seen in a map.

There are 372 properties and districts listed on the National Register in the county, including 5 National Historic Landmarks. The 91 properties and districts that are located outside of Little Rock (including one National Historic Landmark) are listed here, while the sites in Little Rock are listed separately. Another 26 properties in the county have been removed, including 6 outside Little Rock.

Contents: Counties in Arkansas
- Arkansas
- Ashley
- Baxter
- Benton
- Boone
- Bradley
- Calhoun
- Carroll
- Chicot
- Clark
- Clay
- Cleburne
- Cleveland
- Columbia
- Conway
- Craighead
- Crawford
- Crittenden
- Cross
- Dallas
- Desha
- Drew
- Faulkner
- Franklin
- Fulton
- Garland
- Grant
- Greene
- Hempstead
- Hot Spring
- Howard
- Independence
- Izard
- Jackson
- Jefferson
- Johnson
- Lafayette
- Lawrence
- Lee
- Lincoln
- Little River
- Logan
- Lonoke
- Madison
- Marion
- Miller
- Mississippi
- Monroe
- Montgomery
- Nevada
- Newton
- Ouachita
- Perry
- Phillips
- Pike
- Poinsett
- Polk
- Pope
- Prairie
- Pulaski (Little Rock)
- Randolph
- St. Francis
- Saline
- Scott
- Searcy
- Sebastian
- Sevier
- Sharp
- Stone
- Union
- Van Buren
- Washington
- White
- Woodruff
- Yell

This National Park Service list is complete through NPS recent listings posted September 25, 2026.

== Current listings ==
=== Exclusive of Little Rock ===
	Name on the Register	Image	Date listed	Location	City or town	Description
1	All Souls Church	All Souls Church	August 12, 1977 (#77000275)	Off Highway 130; 34°41′56″N 92°05′47″W	Scott	
2	Bailey Allinder House	Bailey Allinder House	December 27, 2002 (#02001600)	301 Skyline Dr. 34°46′52″N 92°15′29″W	North Little Rock	
3	Argenta Historic District	Argenta Historic District	March 15, 1993 (#93000094)	Roughly Melrose Cir. and Willow St. south to W. 4th St., and Main St. from W. 6th St. to W. 3rd St.; also 616 Orange St., 116 W. 7th St., 206 W. 7th St., 212 W. 7th St., 220 W. 7th St., 616 Maple St., and 620 Maple St.; also roughly bounded by N. Poplar, 9th St., N. Broadway, W. 4th, and Broadway; 34°45′32″N 92°16′11″W	North Little Rock	Second and third sets of boundaries represent boundary increases of February 22, 2002 and March 8, 2007 respectively
4	ARKANSAS II (riverboat)	ARKANSAS II (riverboat)	June 14, 1990 (#90000899)	Southern end of Locust St. on David D. Terry Lake; 34°45′05″N 92°15′41″W	North Little Rock	
5	Arkansas Ordnance Plant Guard House	Arkansas Ordnance Plant Guard House	September 20, 2006 (#06000831)	100 Veteran's Circle; 34°52′03″N 92°07′22″W	Jacksonville	On the grounds of the Jacksonville Museum of Military History
6	Carl Bailey Company Building	Carl Bailey Company Building	September 23, 2009 (#09000737)	3100 E. Broadway; 34°45′17″N 92°13′55″W	North Little Rock	
7	Baker House	Baker House	December 6, 1978 (#78000627)	109 5th St. 34°45′30″N 92°16′05″W	North Little Rock	
8	Barth-Hempfling House	Barth-Hempfling House	October 16, 1986 (#86002860)	507 Main St. 34°46′03″N 92°16′03″W	North Little Rock	
9	Bayou Meto (Reed's Bridge) Battlefield	Bayou Meto (Reed's Bridge) Battlefield	December 31, 2002 (#02001627)	Highway 161 at Bayou Meto; 34°50′44″N 92°07′06″W	Jacksonville	
10	Cecil M. Buffalo Jr. House		September 17, 2018 (#100002951)	16324 Arch Street Pike; 34°38′27″N 92°18′33″W	Landmark	
11	Burns Park Golf Center		September 26, 2022 (#100008148)	28 Championship Dr. 34°47′27″N 92°18′27″W	North Little Rock	
12	Carmichael House		May 24, 2018 (#100002478)	13905 Arch Street Pike; 34°37′27″N 92°18′49″W	Landmark	
13	Cherry House	Cherry House	June 1, 1992 (#92000562)	217 Dooley Rd. 34°46′54″N 92°15′23″W	North Little Rock	Designed by Frank Carmean
14	Cherry-Luter Estate	Cherry-Luter Estate	September 4, 1992 (#92001155)	521 W. Scenic Dr. 34°47′03″N 92°17′23″W	North Little Rock	
15	CITY OF OAKLAND (USS HOGA)	CITY OF OAKLAND (USS HOGA)	June 30, 1989 (#89001429)	Arkansas Inland Maritime Museum; 34°45′09″N 92°16′04″W	North Little Rock	Tugboat; at Pearl Harbor fought ship fires and helped push sinking USS Nevada out of the ship channel; served Oakland harbor for many years; The vessel was transferred to the Arkansas Inland Maritime Museum (AIMM) in 2005 and was scheduled to be moved to North Little Rock, Arkansas in 2007. The move has been delayed by damage from Hurricane Katrina along the proposed tow route to AIMM and transport costs. She was moved to the Arkansas Inland Maritime Museum in November 2015.
16	Crestview Park	Crestview Park	December 4, 1986 (#86003583)	Off Crestview Boulevard; 34°46′56″N 92°15′53″W	North Little Rock	
17	Doe Branch Post Office	Doe Branch Post Office	January 26, 2001 (#01000003)	32100 Kanis Rd. 34°47′16″N 92°35′38″W	Ferndale	
18	Duffy House	Duffy House	September 29, 2014 (#14000793)	124 E. A St. 34°46′58″N 92°15′34″W	North Little Rock	
19	East End Methodist Episcopal Church	East End Methodist Episcopal Church	November 12, 2008 (#08001038)	2401 E. Washington Ave. 34°45′14″N 92°14′26″W	North Little Rock	
20	Edgemere Street Bridge	Edgemere Street Bridge	April 9, 1990 (#90000533)	Edgemere St., at Lake No. 3; 34°47′40″N 92°15′00″W	North Little Rock	
21	Barney L. Elias House	Barney L. Elias House	January 27, 2015 (#14001201)	335 Goshen Ave. 34°47′02″N 92°15′04″W	North Little Rock	
22	Engelberger House	Engelberger House	June 14, 1990 (#90000895)	2105 N. Maple St. 34°46′28″N 92°16′06″W	North Little Rock	
23	Joseph E. England Jr. House	Joseph E. England Jr. House	June 1, 1992 (#92000566)	313 Skyline Dr. 34°46′53″N 92°15′29″W	North Little Rock	
24	Faucette Building	Faucette Building	December 6, 1978 (#78000628)	4th and Main Sts. 34°45′26″N 92°16′01″W	North Little Rock	
25	James Peter Faucette House	James Peter Faucette House	January 4, 1978 (#78000629)	316 W. 4th St. 34°45′25″N 92°16′15″W	North Little Rock	
26	First Presbyterian Church Manse	First Presbyterian Church Manse	November 19, 1993 (#93001251)	415 N. Maple St. 34°45′30″N 92°16′09″W	North Little Rock	
27	Fort Logan H. Roots Military Post	Fort Logan H. Roots Military Post	September 4, 1974 (#74000498)	Scenic Hill Dr. 34°46′26″N 92°17′42″W	North Little Rock	
28	Frenchman's Mountain Methodist Episcopal Church-South and Cemetery	Frenchman's Mountain Methodist Episcopal Church-South and Cemetery	October 22, 1976 (#76000450)	West of Cato on Cato Rd. 34°55′41″N 92°15′53″W	Cato	
29	Hanger Cotton Gin	Hanger Cotton Gin	October 8, 1976 (#76000463)	Harper Rd. and Gates Lane; 34°41′11″N 92°14′12″W	Sweet Home	
30	Harris House		January 1, 1976 (#76000451)	Southeast of Hensley off Highway 365; 34°29′40″N 92°10′07″W	Hensley	
31	Hodge-Cook House	Hodge-Cook House	November 19, 1993 (#93001252)	620 N. Maple St. 34°45′36″N 92°16′07″W	North Little Rock	
32	Howell-Garner-Monfee House	Howell-Garner-Monfee House	January 4, 1978 (#78000630)	300 W. 4th St. 34°45′25″N 92°16′13″W	North Little Rock	
33	George D.D. Huie Grocery Store Building	George D.D. Huie Grocery Store Building	January 20, 2005 (#04001504)	1400 N. Pine St. 34°46′01″N 92°15′37″W	North Little Rock	
34	Immaculate Heart of Mary Church	Immaculate Heart of Mary Church	December 22, 1982 (#82000901)	North of North Little Rock off Highway 365; 34°52′36″N 92°20′32″W	North Little Rock	
35	Immaculate Heart of Mary School	Immaculate Heart of Mary School	September 16, 1993 (#93000965)	Off Highway 365, north of Blue Hill Rd. 34°52′35″N 92°20′26″W	Marche	
36	Jacksonville Commercial Historic District	Jacksonville Commercial Historic District	February 8, 2016 (#15000631)	1st from Mulberry to W. Hickory Sts. 34°51′57″N 92°06′39″W	Jacksonville	
37	Jeffries House	Jeffries House	June 1, 1992 (#92000567)	415 Skyline Dr. 34°46′50″N 92°15′21″W	North Little Rock	
38	K. C. Baking Powder Building		May 12, 2021 (#100006529)	3401 East Broadway; 34°45′18″N 92°13′43″W	North Little Rock	
39	Dr. Charles H. Kennedy House	Dr. Charles H. Kennedy House	September 21, 2017 (#100001651)	6 Edenwood Ln. 34°49′01″N 92°14′53″W	North Little Rock	
40	Alton and Ruby Mae Kerby House	Alton and Ruby Mae Kerby House	September 15, 2021 (#100006929)	532 Skyline Dr. 34°46′48″N 92°15′15″W	North Little Rock	
41	Kleiber House	Kleiber House	June 1, 1992 (#92000561)	637 Skyline Dr. 34°46′55″N 92°15′16″W	North Little Rock	
42	La Belle Creole		January 10, 2024 (#100009764)	8101 Barrett Road; 34°49′45″N 92°31′42″W	Roland vicinity	
43	Lake No. 1 Bridge	Lake No. 1 Bridge	April 9, 1990 (#90000534)	Avondale Rd., over Lake No. 1; 34°47′20″N 92°15′08″W	North Little Rock	
44	Lakeshore Drive Bridge	Lakeshore Drive Bridge	April 9, 1990 (#90000532)	Lakeshore Dr. at Lake No. 3; 34°47′41″N 92°15′06″W	North Little Rock	
45	Lakewood Park	Lakewood Park	December 4, 1986 (#86003586)	North end of Lake No. 3; 34°47′50″N 92°15′05″W	North Little Rock	
46	Laman Plaza Gazebo	Laman Plaza Gazebo	April 10, 2024 (#100008567)	2700 Willow St. 34°46′47″N 92°16′13″W	North Little Rock	
47	Land's End Plantation	Land's End Plantation	January 27, 1999 (#99000044)	1 Land's End Ln. 34°53′36″N 92°07′08″W	Scott	
48	Lloyd England Hall		May 9, 1997 (#97000403)	Northwestern corner of the junction of Missouri Ave. and 6th St. 34°49′31″N 92°17′13″W	North Little Rock	Houses the Arkansas National Guard Museum
49	Locust Street Overpass	Locust Street Overpass	January 12, 2021 (#100006030)	Locust St. between S.A. Jones Dr. (East 9th St.) and East 13th St. 34°45′50″N 92°15′41″W	North Little Rock	
50	E. O. Manees House	E. O. Manees House	August 6, 1975 (#75000413)	216 W. 4th St. 34°45′24″N 92°16′11″W	North Little Rock	
51	Matthews House	Matthews House	September 29, 1983 (#83001165)	406 Goshen; 34°45′54″N 92°15′02″W	North Little Rock	
52	Justin Matthews Jr. House	Justin Matthews Jr. House	December 18, 1990 (#90001933)	257 Skyline Dr. 34°46′54″N 92°15′30″W	North Little Rock	
53	Matthews-Bradshaw House	Matthews-Bradshaw House	June 1, 1992 (#92000568)	524 Skyline Dr. 34°46′47″N 92°15′17″W	North Little Rock	
54	Matthews-Bryan House	Matthews-Bryan House	June 1, 1992 (#92000560)	320 Dooley Rd. 34°46′51″N 92°15′15″W	North Little Rock	
55	Matthews-Dillon House	Matthews-Dillon House	June 1, 1992 (#92000563)	701 Skyline Dr. 34°46′55″N 92°15′21″W	North Little Rock	
56	Matthews-Godt House	Matthews-Godt House	June 1, 1992 (#92000565)	248 Skyline Dr. 34°46′55″N 92°15′32″W	North Little Rock	
57	Matthews-MacFadyen House	Matthews-MacFadyen House	June 1, 1992 (#92000569)	206 Dooley Rd. 34°46′52″N 92°15′23″W	North Little Rock	
58	Maumelle Ordnance Works Bunker #4	Maumelle Ordnance Works Bunker #4	May 24, 2006 (#06000417)	4 Willastein Dr. 34°51′16″N 92°24′46″W	Maumelle	
59	Maumelle River Bridge	Maumelle River Bridge	January 21, 2020 (#100004894)	Old AR 300 over the Maumelle River; 34°51′05″N 92°29′00″W	Natural Steps vicinity	
60	McCraw Cemetery	McCraw Cemetery	September 20, 2006 (#06000829)	East of 2101 Old Military Rd. 34°51′10″N 92°05′15″W	Jacksonville	
61	McKenzie House	McKenzie House	March 5, 1992 (#92000105)	4911 Highway 161; 34°41′39″N 92°05′48″W	Scott	
62	Robert and Marion Millett House No. 1	Robert and Marion Millett House No. 1	January 14, 2021 (#100006033)	1708 Waterside Dr. 34°47′01″N 92°14′49″W	North Little Rock	
63	North Little Rock City Hall	North Little Rock City Hall	August 6, 1975 (#75000414)	3rd and Main Sts. 34°45′22″N 92°16′02″W	North Little Rock	
64	North Little Rock High School	North Little Rock High School	February 25, 1993 (#92001625)	101 W. 22nd St. 34°46′34″N 92°16′05″W	North Little Rock	
65	North Little Rock Post Office	North Little Rock Post Office	December 22, 1982 (#82000915)	420 N. Main St. 34°45′28″N 92°16′02″W	North Little Rock	Now houses the Argenta Branch Library
66	North Little Rock Veterans Administration Hospital Historic District	North Little Rock Veterans Administration Hospital Historic District	February 20, 2013 (#13000021)	2200 Fort Roots Dr. 34°46′40″N 92°17′50″W	North Little Rock	
67	Old Central Fire Station	Old Central Fire Station	December 22, 1977 (#77000274)	506 Main St. 34°45′30″N 92°16′02″W	North Little Rock	
68	Owings House	Owings House	June 1, 1992 (#92000564)	563 Skyline Dr. 34°46′50″N 92°15′13″W	North Little Rock	
69	Palarm Bayou Pioneer Cemetery		January 20, 2005 (#04001491)	Lot 13 in the Mountain Crest Subdivision, northeast of Highway 365; 34°54′01″N 92°26′23″W	Morgan	The Mountain Crest Subdivision is a gated community.
70	Park Hill Fire Station and Water Company Complex	Park Hill Fire Station and Water Company Complex	November 19, 1993 (#93001248)	3417-3421 Magnolia St. 34°47′13″N 92°15′52″W	North Little Rock	
71	Park Hill Historic District	Park Hill Historic District	August 16, 2000 (#00000935)	Roughly bounded by Plainview Circle, Crestview Boulevard, Ridge St., and H Ave. 34°47′09″N 92°15′40″W	North Little Rock	
72	Pruniski House	Pruniski House	February 9, 1990 (#90000116)	345 Goshen Ave. 34°47′07″N 92°15′12″W	North Little Rock	
73	T. R. Pugh Memorial Park	T. R. Pugh Memorial Park	December 4, 1986 (#86003585)	Near the junction of Fairway Ave. and Lakeshore Dr. 34°47′30″N 92°14′57″W	North Little Rock	
74	Pyeatte-Mason Cemetery	Pyeatte-Mason Cemetery	November 7, 1996 (#96001276)	Southwestern corner of the junction of Waterside and Lily Sts. 34°51′07″N 92°25′10″W	Maumelle	
75	Rapillard House	Rapillard House	November 19, 1993 (#93001249)	123 W. 7th St. 34°45′39″N 92°16′06″W	North Little Rock	
76	Rock Island-Argenta Depot	Rock Island-Argenta Depot	September 21, 1989 (#89001403)	4th and Hazel; 34°45′24″N 92°15′13″W	North Little Rock	
77	Roland Cutoff site		March 22, 2024 (#100009787)	Address Restricted	Roland vicinity	
78	Roundtop Filling Station	Roundtop Filling Station	January 24, 2008 (#07001432)	Junction of Trammel and Roundtop Rds. 34°48′44″N 92°10′42″W	Sherwood	
79	Gene Rush House		January 24, 2019 (#100003335)	9515 Barrett Rd. 34°50′13″N 92°31′18″W	Roland	
80	St. Joseph's Home	St. Joseph's Home	May 4, 1976 (#76000462)	Camp Robinson Rd. off Highway 176; 34°48′59″N 92°16′17″W	North Little Rock	
81	Fred and Lucy Alexander Schaer House	Fred and Lucy Alexander Schaer House	September 27, 2007 (#07000993)	13219 U.S. Route 70; 34°46′25″N 92°07′07″W	Galloway	
82	Seed Warehouse No. 5	Seed Warehouse No. 5	January 21, 2010 (#09001259)	Southwestern corner of U.S. Route 165 and Highway 161; 34°41′47″N 92°05′47″W	Scott	
83	Steele-Dortch General Store		January 13, 2025 (#100011294)	4815 Arkansas Highway 161 South; 34°41′43″N 92°05′48″W	Scott	
84	Sam and Shirley Strauss House	Sam and Shirley Strauss House	September 28, 2015 (#15000634)	4 Sunset Dr. 34°47′02″N 92°20′53″W	Cammack Village	
85	Sylvan Hills Country Club Golf Course	Sylvan Hills Country Club Golf Course	July 28, 2010 (#10000289)	7400 North Highway 107; 34°49′20″N 92°13′39″W	Sherwood	
86	USS RAZORBACK (SS-394)	USS RAZORBACK (SS-394)	September 1, 2005 (#04001502)	Northern bank of the Arkansas River in the vicinity of an Interstate 30 bridge 34°45′13″N 92°15′49″W	North Little Rock	WWII U.S. submarine that served Turkey
87	Walnut Grove Methodist Church	Walnut Grove Methodist Church	September 28, 1977 (#77000273)	West of Little Rock on Walnut Grove Rd. 34°46′00″N 92°30′42″W	Shady Grove	
88	Mabel Vallea Lustron House		September 10, 2026 (#100013411)	706 Skyline Drive; 34°46′57″N 92°15′19″W	North Little Rock	
89	Walter Vestal House	Walter Vestal House	February 8, 2021 (#100006034)	331 Goshen Ave. 34°47′03″N 92°15′06″W	North Little Rock	
90	Waterside Street Bridge	Waterside Street Bridge	June 14, 1990 (#90000888)	Waterside St. near its junction with Jacksonville Boulevard; 34°46′59″N 92°14′46″W	North Little Rock	
91	West-Blazer House		September 21, 2017 (#100001652)	8107 Peters Rd. 34°56′24″N 92°05′24″W	Jacksonville	

== Former listings ==
	Name on the Register	Image	Date listed	Date removed	Location	City or town	Description
1	Amboy Overpass	Amboy Overpass	May 18, 1995 (#95000608)	September 1, 2022	Highway 365 over Union Pacific railroad tracks, north of the junction of Highways 176 and 365; 34°48′05″N 92°17′30″W	North Little Rock	Replaced in 2017.
2	Cook House		November 19, 1993 (#93001250)	September 14, 2002	116 W. 7th Street	North Little Rock	
3	Pulaski County Road 67D Bridge		May 26, 1995 (#95000651)	July 20, 2000	Co. Rd. 67D over Bridge Cr.	Jacksonville	A concrete slab bridge. Replaced in 2000.
4	Pulaski County Road 71D Bridge		May 26, 1995 (#95000652)	January 14, 2002	County Road 71D over Bayou Meto	Jacksonville	
5	Wolf Bayou Bridge		May 26, 2004 (#04000502)	May 25, 2006	Pulaski County Road 85	Scott	A Warren pony-truss bridge from 1924. Replaced in 2006.
6	Young House		June 1, 1992 (#92000559)	January 24, 2011	436 Skyline Dr. 34°46′48″N 92°15′30″W	North Little Rock	Destroyed by fire in December 2007

== See also ==
- List of National Historic Landmarks in Arkansas
- National Register of Historic Places listings in Arkansas
