= Dr. Charles H. Kennedy House =

Historic house in Arkansas, United States

- U.S. National Register of Historic Places
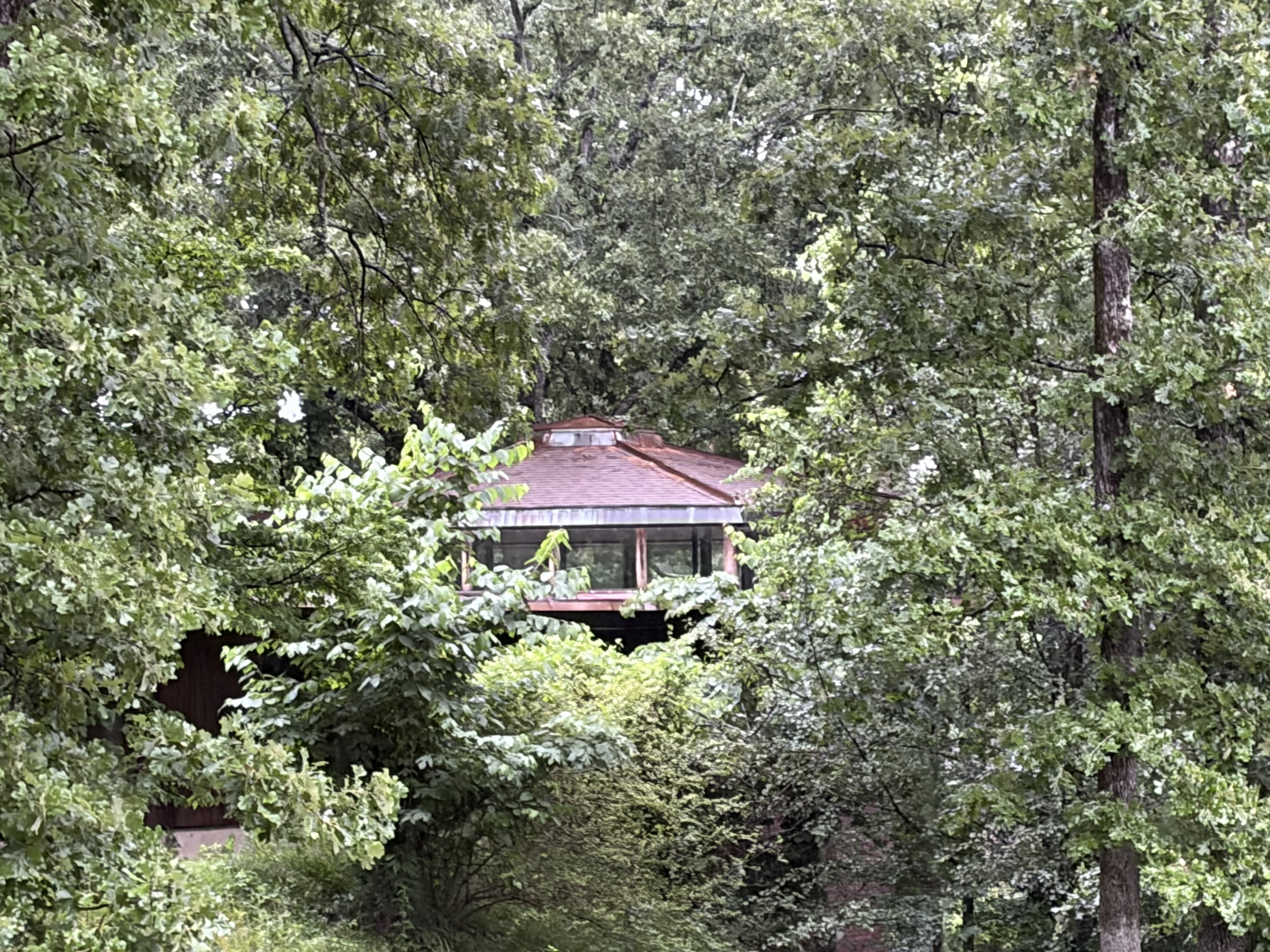
- The Kennedy House viewed through trees in 2026

- Location within Arkansas Location within the United States
- Location: 6 Edenwood Ln., North Little Rock, Arkansas
- Coordinates: 34°49′1″N 92°14′53″W
- Area: 1.5 acres (0.61 ha)
- Built: 1964
- Architect: Warren Segraves
- Architectural style: Mid-Century Modern
- NRHP reference No.: 100001651
- Added to NRHP: September 21, 2017

The Dr. Charles H. Kennedy House is a historic house at 6 Edenwood Lane in North Little Rock, Arkansas, U.S. It is a single story steel frame structure, organized as three hexagonal pods joined by linear sections. The pods divide the house's functional spaces: one is for public living spaces and amenities, including the kitchen, living room, and dining area, one has the master bedroom suite, and one has a guest space and playroom. The exterior is clad in a combination of brick veneer and vertical board siding. The roof is flat except for the pods, which have pyramidal roofs. The house was built in 1964 to a design by the Arkansas architect Warren Segraves.

The house was listed on the National Register of Historic Places in 2017.

== See also ==
- National Register of Historic Places listings in Pulaski County, Arkansas
