= Walnut Grove Methodist Church =

Historic church in Arkansas, United States

- U.S. National Register of Historic Places
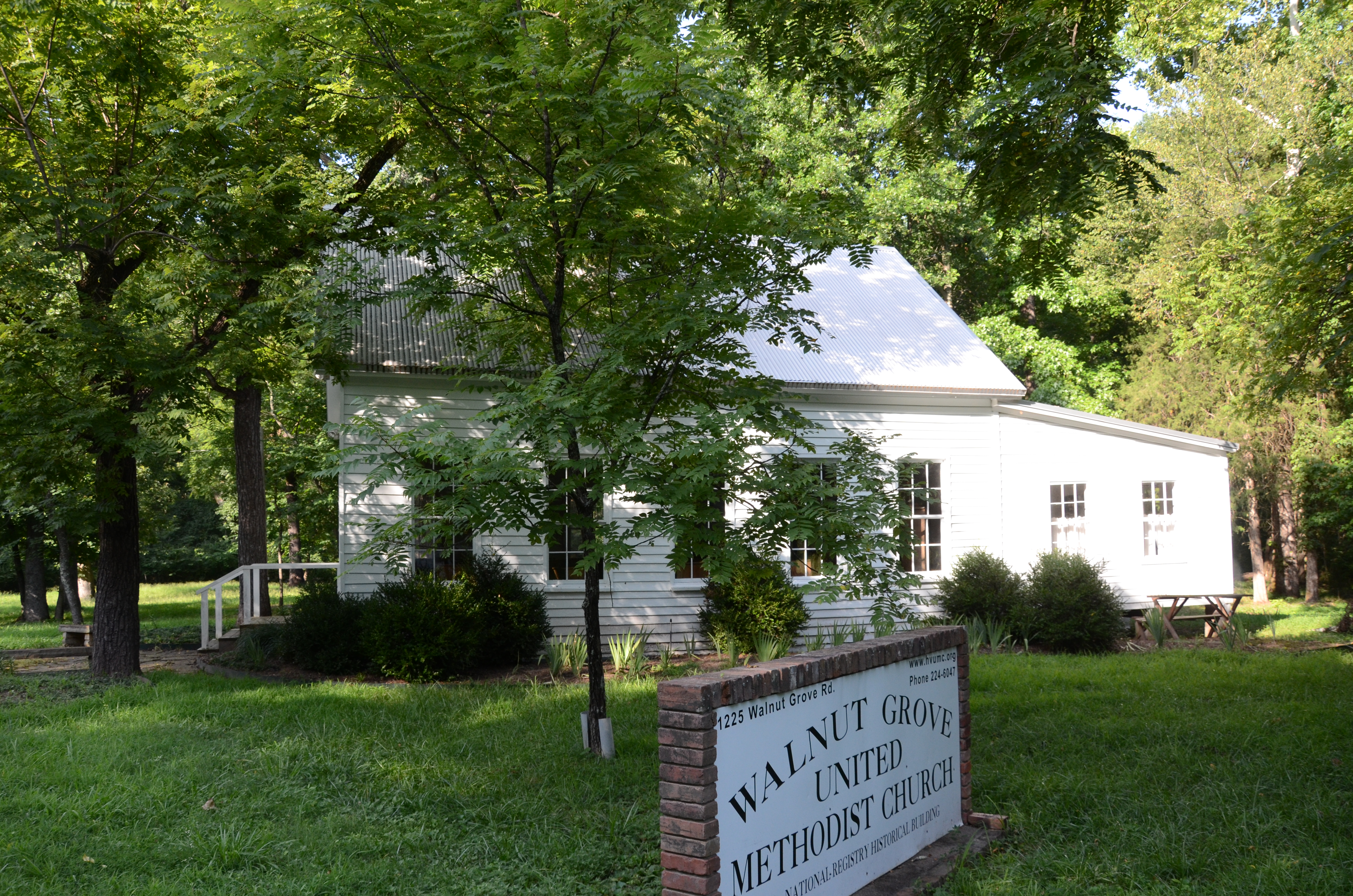

- Location within Arkansas Location within the United States
- Nearest city: Little Rock, Arkansas
- Coordinates: 34°46′0″N 92°30′42″W
- Area: 1 acre (0.40 ha)
- Built: 1885
- NRHP reference No.: 77000273
- Added to NRHP: September 28, 1977

Walnut Grove Methodist Church is a historic church in rural western Pulaski County, Arkansas. It is located southwest of Little Rock, on the east side of Walnut Grove Road between County Roads 38 and 31. The modest wood-frame building has a single story, a gabled roof, rough-cut clapboard siding, and regional Greek Revival ornamentation. Its interior is finished with wooden planking, and it retains original period pews of similarly simple construction. Built in 1885, it is the oldest church in Pulaski County.

The church was listed on the National Register of Historic Places in 1977.

== See also ==
- National Register of Historic Places listings in Pulaski County, Arkansas
