= Hodge-Cook House =

Historic house in Arkansas, United States

- U.S. National Register of Historic Places
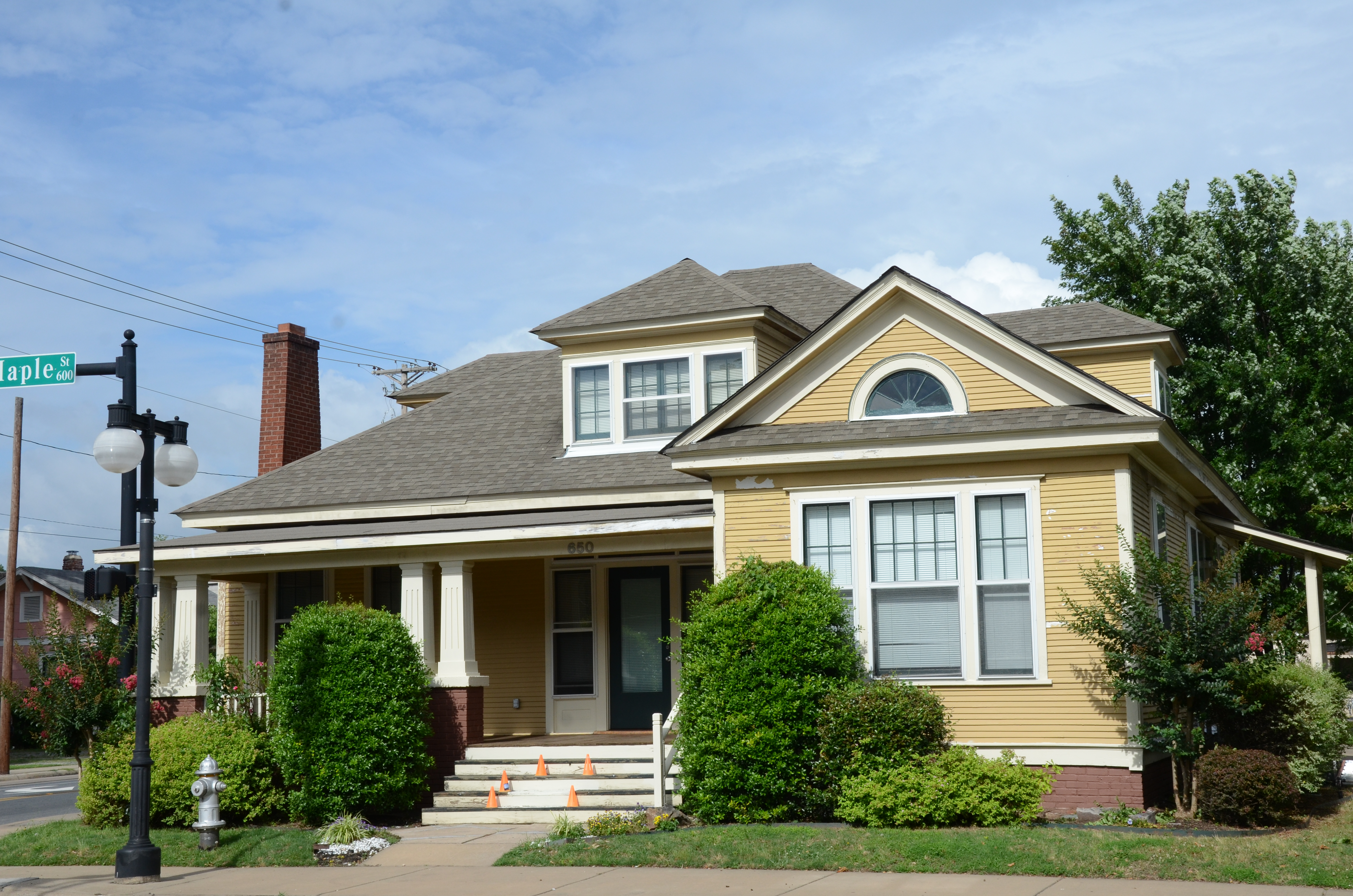

- Location within Arkansas Location within the United States
- Location: 620 N. Maple St., North Little Rock, Arkansas
- Coordinates: 34°45′36″N 92°16′7″W
- Area: less than one acre
- Built: 1898
- Architectural style: Colonial Revival
- NRHP reference No.: 93001252
- Added to NRHP: November 19, 1993

The Hodge-Cook House is a historic house at 620 North Maple Street in North Little Rock, Arkansas. It is a 1 1/2-story wood-frame structure, with clapboard siding and a hip roof pierced by hip-roof dormers on each side. A gable-roof section projects from the right side of the front, with a three-part sash window and a half-round window in the gable. A porch extends across the rest of the front, supported by tapered Craftsman-style fluted square columns. The house was built c. 1898 by John Hodge, a local businessman, and is one of the city's finest examples of vernacular Colonial Revival architecture.

The house was listed on the National Register of Historic Places in 1993.

== See also ==
- National Register of Historic Places listings in Pulaski County, Arkansas
