= Doe Branch Post Office =

- U.S. National Register of Historic Places
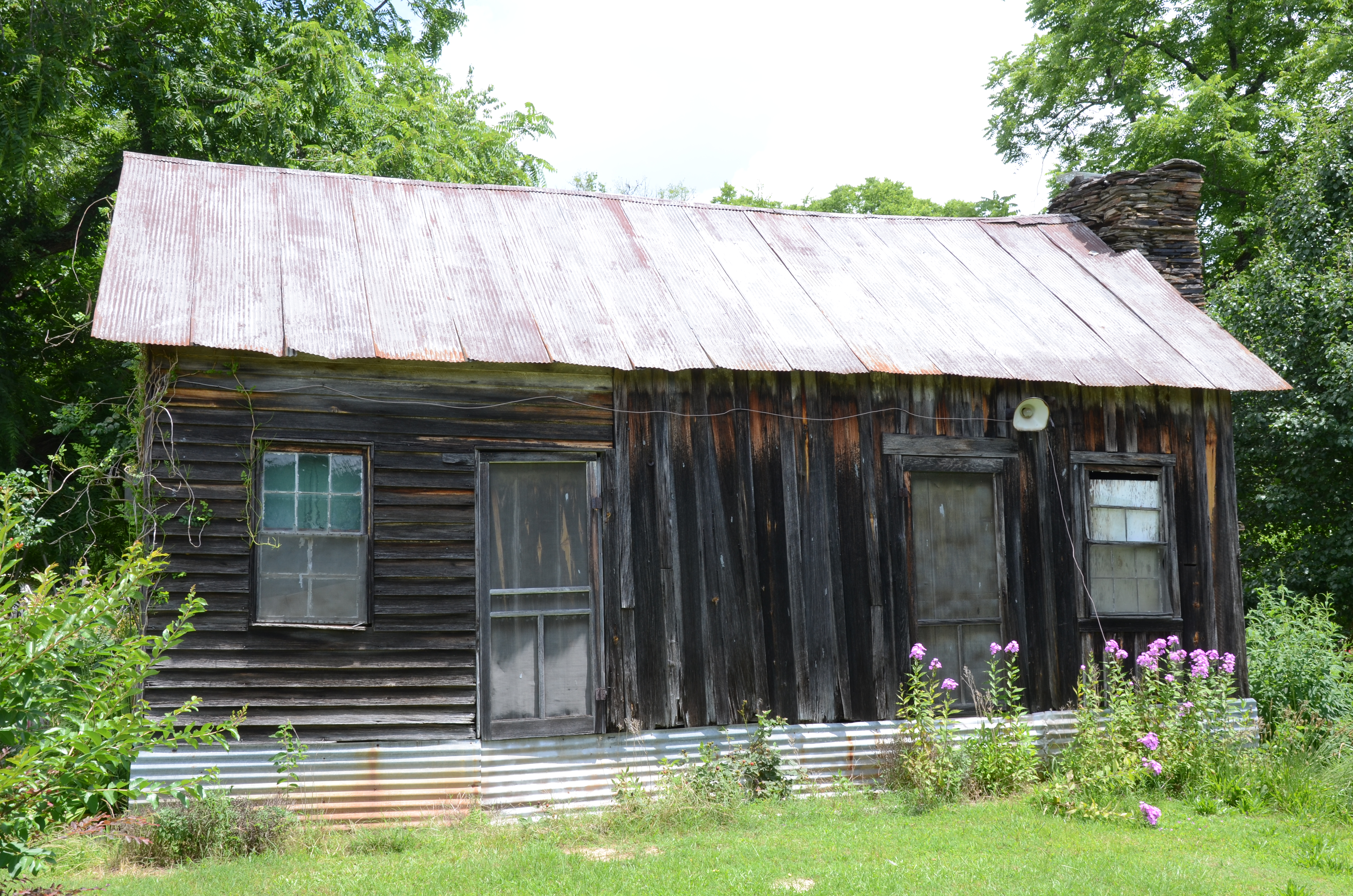

- Location within Arkansas Location within the United States
- Location: 32100 Kanis Rd., Ferndale, Arkansas
- Coordinates: 34°47′16″N 92°35′38″W
- Area: less than one acre
- Built: 1890
- Built by: Noah Richards
- Architectural style: Plain-Traditional
- NRHP reference No.: 01000003
- Added to NRHP: January 26, 2001

The Doe Branch Post Office is a historic house and post office in rural western Pulaski County, Arkansas. Located on the north side of Kanis Road (County Road 38), just west of its junction with Golden Eagle Drive, it is an L-shaped single-story structure built in a sequence of steps. The oldest portion is a single-pen board-and-batten structure, built in 1890 by Noah Richards. To this were added a clapboard addition to the side, a porch to the rear, and a kitchen, also to the rear, giving the building its present L shape. The building is one of the oldest in the Ferndale area, which was originally known as Doe Run, and was occupied by two generations of the Richards family.

The building was listed on the National Register of Historic Places in 2001.

== See also ==
- National Register of Historic Places listings in Pulaski County, Arkansas
- List of United States post offices
