= Bailey Allinder House =

Historic house in Arkansas, United States

- U.S. National Register of Historic Places
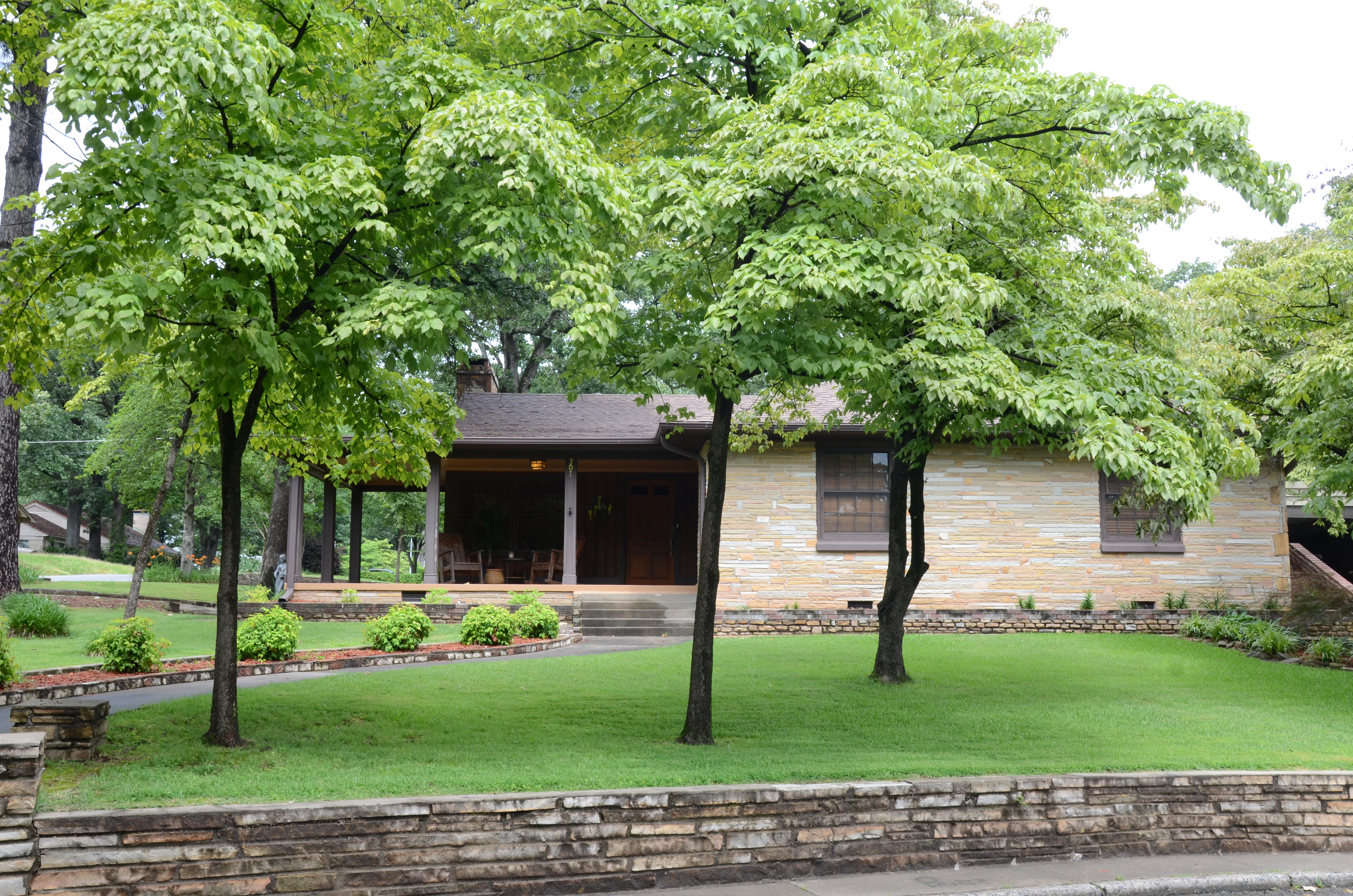

- Location within Arkansas Location within the United States
- Location: 301 Skyline Drive, North Little Rock, Arkansas
- Coordinates: 34°46′52″N 92°15′29″W
- Area: less than one acre
- Built: 1949; 77 years ago
- Architect: Metro Builder
- Architectural style: Minimal Traditional
- NRHP reference No.: 02001600
- Added to NRHP: December 27, 2002; 23 years ago

The Bailey Allinder House is a historic house located at 301 Skyline Drive in the Park Hill neighborhood of North Little Rock, Arkansas. It is representative of the transition from the Minimal Traditional style to the Ranch style form, yet it also reflects subtle Rustic influences reminiscent of Frank Lloyd Wright's incorporation of natural materials and setting in the design of his work.

== Description and history ==
It is a single-story L-shaped structure, fashioned out of sandstone and fieldstone. The house, built in 1948–49, represents a stylistic transition between the pre-World War II minimalist architecture of the early houses in the neighborhood, and more typical Ranch style construction found in later houses. Bailey Allinder was an auto mechanic; his wife was a piano teacher.

The house was listed on the National Register of Historic Places on December 27, 2002.

== See also ==
- National Register of Historic Places listings in Pulaski County, Arkansas
