= Harris House (Hensley, Arkansas) =

Historic house in Arkansas, United States

- U.S. National Register of Historic Places
- Location within Arkansas Location within the United States
- Nearest city: Hensley, Arkansas
- Coordinates: 34°29′40″N 92°10′7″W
- Area: less than one acre
- Built: 1856
- Architect: William R. Gibbons
- NRHP reference No.: 76000451
- Added to NRHP: January 1, 1976

The Harris House is a historic house in rural southeastern Pulaski County, Arkansas. Built in 1856, it is one of the oldest houses in central Arkansas. It is a modest 1 1/2-story wood-frame structure, built out of local hand-hewn cypress and handmade bricks. It has an open porch extending across a five-bay front facade, with gable dormers projecting from the roof above. The entrance is flanked by sidelight windows and topped by a transom. The wood used in construction is virgin cypress, some of it planed to a width of 16 inches (41 cm). The house was built on land acquired by Robert Harris in 1853, part of which was granted by President John Quincy Adams. The land was still in the hands of Harris' descendants in 1976, when it was listed on the National Register of Historic Places.

== See also ==
- National Register of Historic Places listings in Pulaski County, Arkansas
