= James Peter Faucette House =

Historic house in Arkansas, United States

- U.S. National Register of Historic Places
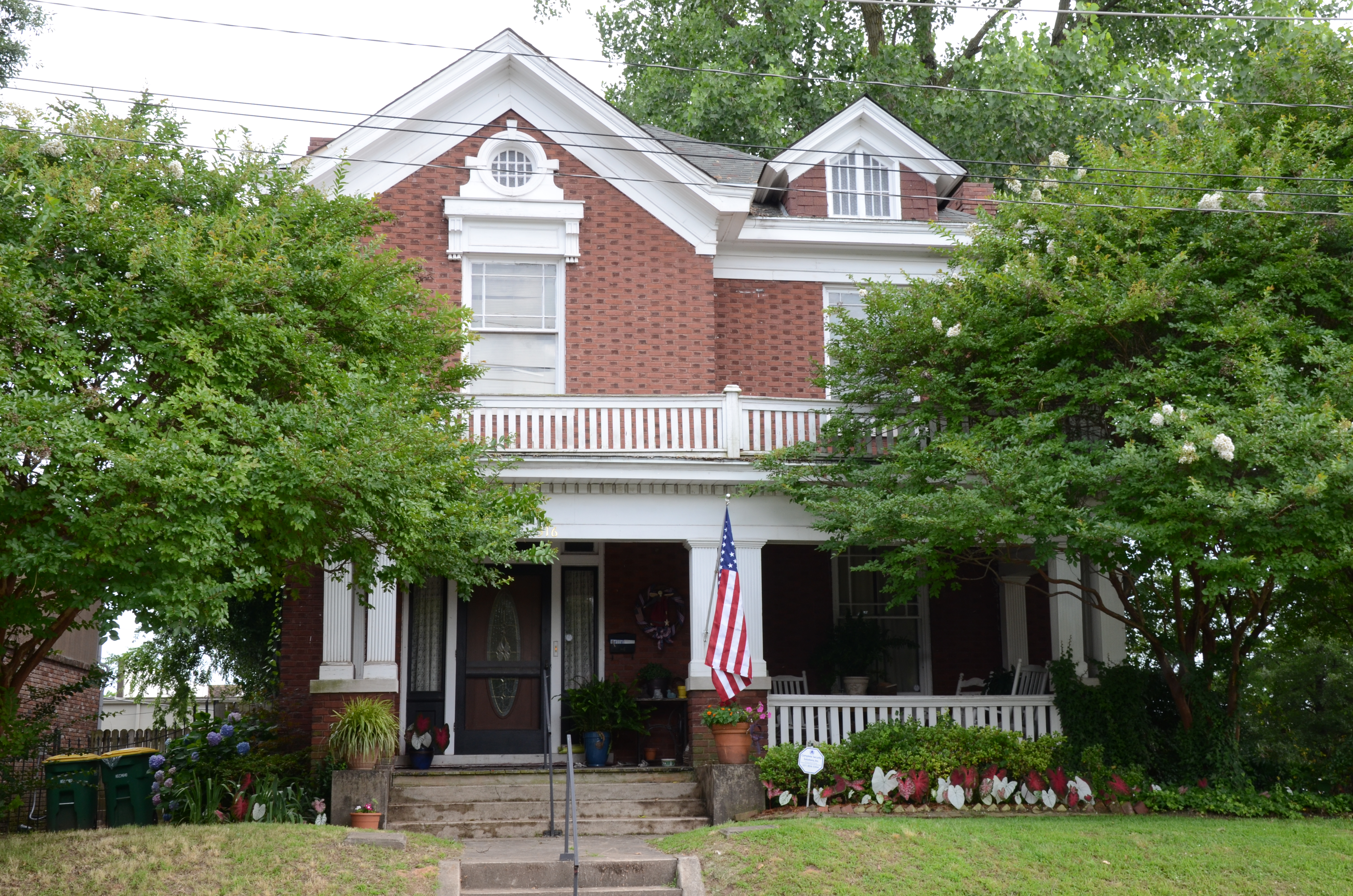

- Location within Arkansas Location within the United States
- Location: 316 W. 4th St., North Little Rock, Arkansas
- Coordinates: 34°45′25″N 92°16′15″W
- Area: less than one acre
- Built: 1912
- NRHP reference No.: 78000629
- Added to NRHP: January 4, 1978

The James Peter Faucette House is a historic house at 316 West Fourth Street in North Little Rock, Arkansas. It is a 2 1/2-story brick structure, roughly square in shape, with a projecting gabled section at the left of its front (southern) facade. A single-story porch extends across the front, supported by grouped square fluted columns on brick piers, with a balustrade across the top. The house was built c. 1912 by Mayor James P. Faucette, and is one of the city's finer examples of Colonial Revival architecture.

The house was listed on the National Register of Historic Places in 1978.

== See also ==
- National Register of Historic Places listings in Pulaski County, Arkansas
