= E. O. Manees House =

Historic house in Arkansas, United States

- U.S. National Register of Historic Places
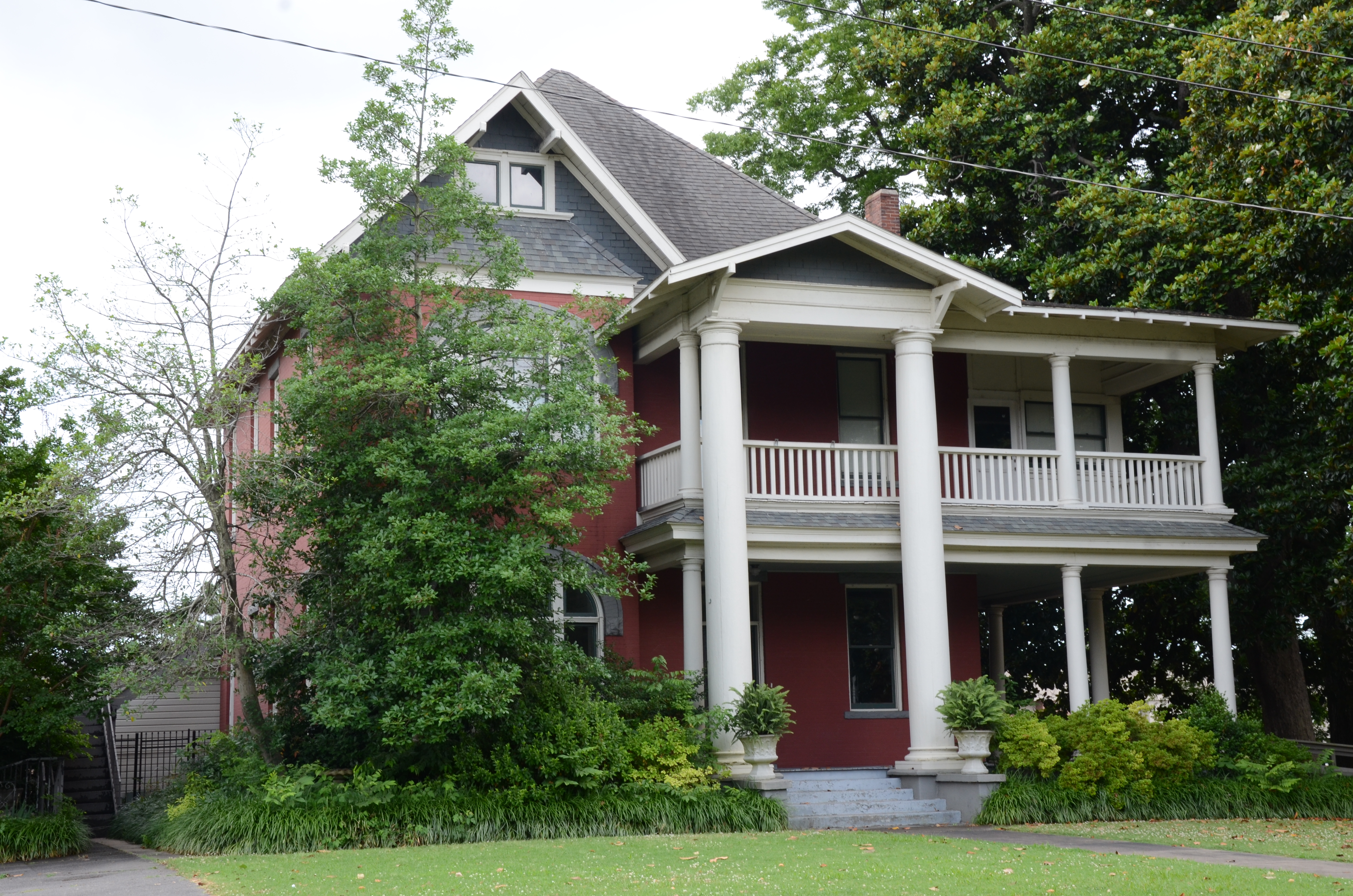

- Location within Arkansas Location within the United States
- Location: 216 W. 4th St., North Little Rock, Arkansas
- Coordinates: 34°45′24″N 92°16′11″W
- Area: less than one acre
- Built: 1895
- Built by: Solon Humphrey
- NRHP reference No.: 75000413
- Added to NRHP: August 6, 1975

The E.O. Manees House is a historic house at 216 West Fourth Street in North Little Rock, Arkansas. It is a 2-story T-shaped brick house with Colonial Revival and Classical Revival styling. It is topped by a tall hip roof, from which several gables project to the front. One is above the main entrance, supported by two-story Doric columns, and shelters part of a two-story porch that covers the right half of the front and part of the side. The house was built in 1895, and was extensively remodeled about 1920 by E. O. Manees, a prominent local businessman and politician.

The house was listed on the National Register of Historic Places in 1975.

== See also ==
- National Register of Historic Places listings in Pulaski County, Arkansas
