= Barney L. Elias House =

Historic house in Arkansas, United States

- U.S. National Register of Historic Places
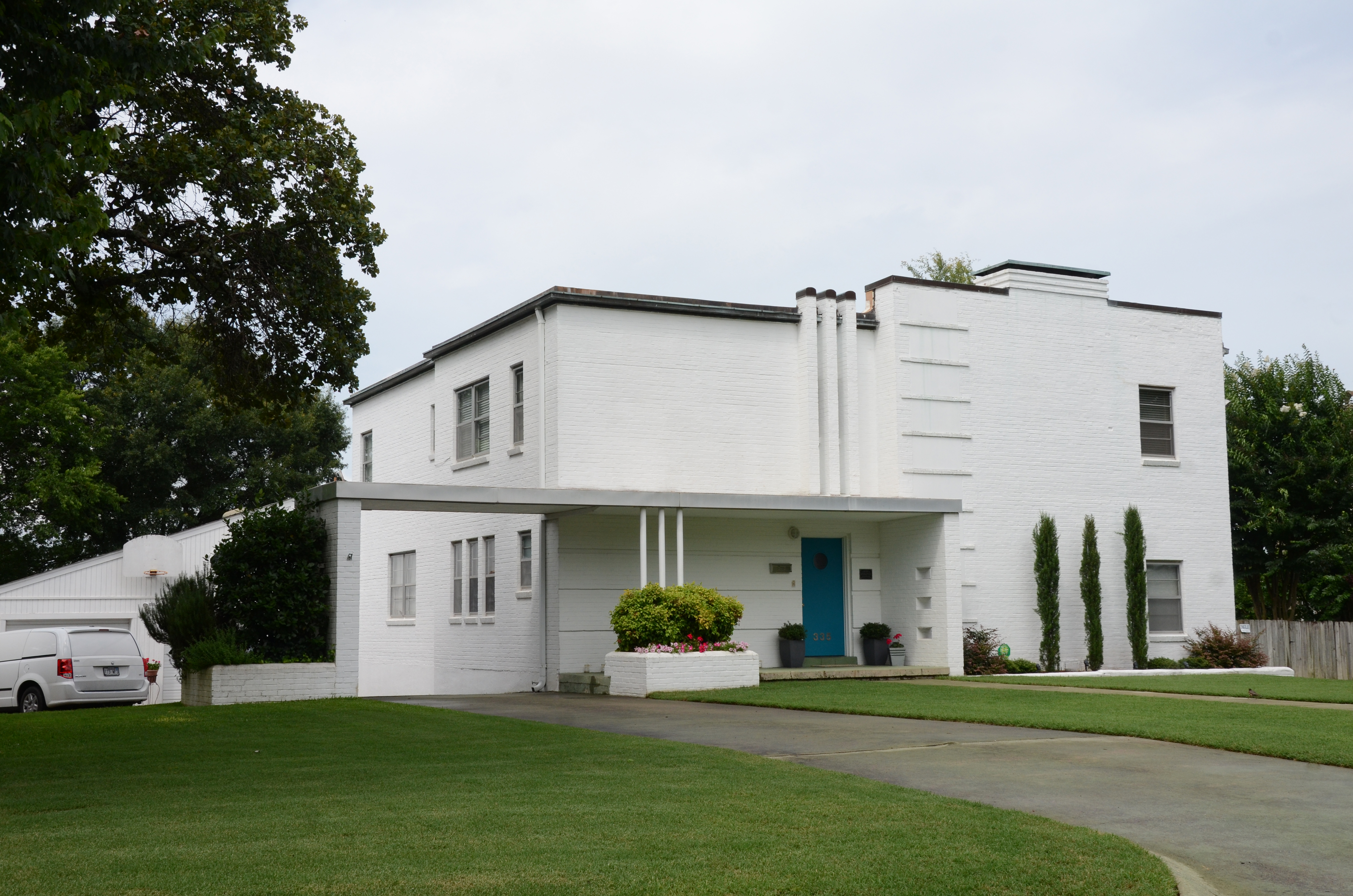

- Location within Arkansas Location within the United States
- Location: 335 Goshen Avenue, North Little Rock, Arkansas
- Coordinates: 34°47′2″N 92°15′4″W
- Area: less than one acre
- Built: 1949
- Architectural style: Modernist
- NRHP reference No.: 14001201
- Added to NRHP: January 27, 2015

The Barney L. Elias House is a historic house, in a modernist architecture style, located at 335 Goshen Avenue in North Little Rock, Arkansas.

== Description and history ==
It is a large modernist brick structure, built in 1949 by local builder Barney L. Elias for his family. It is an early example of modern architecture in Arkansas, using brick and poured concrete, and metal frame windows, as residential building materials. Its flat roof notably included an experimental water-control system that was intended to allow water to pool on it as a passive cooling mechanism; this system never worked properly, and required repeated roof replacements and the addition of a guttered drainage system to correct. The house is two stories, blocky in shape, with a flat-roof porch that extends from the entrance to the driveway, where it forms a porte-cochere.

The house was listed on the National Register of Historic Places on January 27, 2015.

== See also ==
- National Register of Historic Places listings in Pulaski County, Arkansas
