= Carl Bailey Company Building =

- U.S. National Register of Historic Places
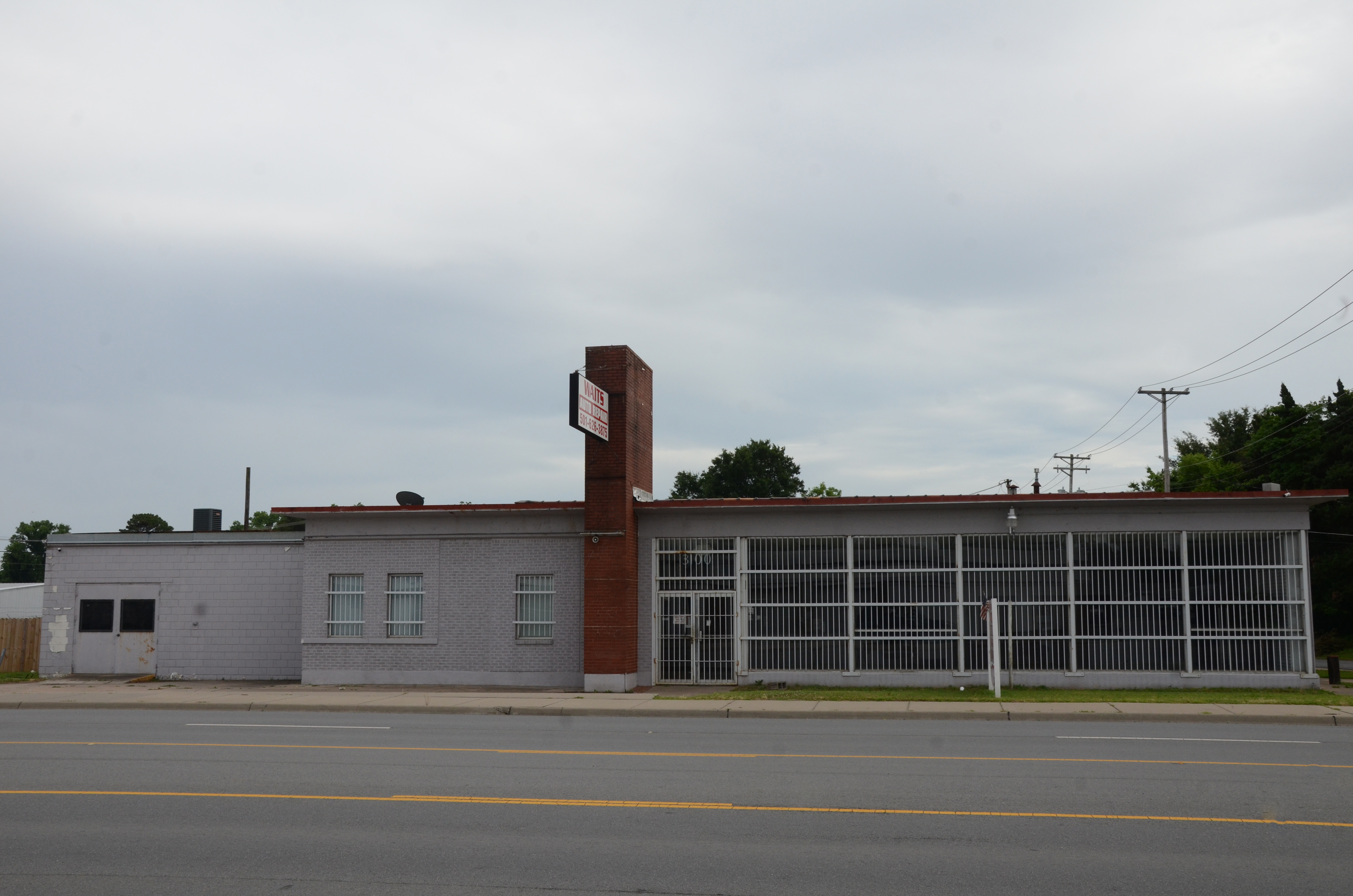

- Location within Arkansas Location within the United States
- Location: 3100 E. Broadway, North Little Rock, Arkansas
- Coordinates: 34.75492°N 92.23213°W
- Area: Less than one acre
- NRHP reference No.: 09000737
- Added to NRHP: September 23, 2009

The Carl Bailey Company Building is a historic commercial building at 3100 East Broadway in North Little Rock, Arkansas. Built about 1945, it is an International style structure modeled on the International Harvester "Servicenter" design of noted industrial designer Raymond Loewy, one of his few known building designs. It has a low front section, originally housing offices and showrooms, and a taller rear section that was used as a service area. A prominent brick pylon rises from the front of the building, which was originally adorned with the company name and International Harvester logo.

The building was listed on the National Register of Historic Places in 2009.

== See also ==
- National Register of Historic Places listings in Pulaski County, Arkansas
