= Matthews House =

Matthews House or Matthews Hall may refer to:

== United States ==
(by state then city)

- Justin Matthews Jr. House, North Little Rock, Arkansas, listed on the National Register of Historic Places (NRHP) in Pulaski County
- Matthews House (North Little Rock, Arkansas), listed on the NRHP in Pulaski County
- Matthews-Bradshaw House, North Little Rock, Arkansas, listed on the NRHP in Pulaski County
- Matthews-Bryan House, North Little Rock, Arkansas, listed on the NRHP in Pulaski County
- Matthews-Dillon House, North Little Rock, Arkansas, listed on the NRHP in Pulaski County
- Matthews-Godt House, North Little Rock, Arkansas, listed on the NRHP in Pulaski County
- Matthews-MacFadyen House, North Little Rock, Arkansas, listed on the NRHP in Pulaski County
- Butler-Matthews Homestead, Tulip, Arkansas, listed on the NRHP in Dallas County
- Matthews Hall (Arizona State University), listed on the NRHP in Maricopa County
- Matthews House (Danburg, Georgia), listed on the NRHP in Lincoln County
- Harman-Watson-Matthews House, Greenville, Georgia, listed on the NRHP in Meriwether County
- Thomas and Margaret Spencer Matthews Farm, Amador, Michigan, listed on the NRHP in Sanilac County
- Matthews Place, Hollister, North Carolina, listed on the NRHP in Halifax County
- Dr. James O. Matthews Office, Taylors Bridge, North Carolina, listed on the NRHP in Sampson County
- Halloran-Matthews-Brady House, Spearfish, South Dakota, listed on the NRHP in Lawrence County
- Pleasant L. Matthews House, Georgetown, Tennessee, listed on the NRHP in Hamilton County
- Matthews-Atwood House, Ennis, Texas, listed on the NRHP in Ellis County
- Matthews-Templeton House, Ennis, Texas, listed on the NRHP in Ellis County

== See also ==
- Mathews House (disambiguation)
