= Frank Carmean =

American architect

Frank Carmean was an architect in Arkansas. Not formally trained as an architect, but rather experienced in building construction, he became a designer. He joined a firm in 1927 that was developing the Edgemont residential area of Little Rock, and is believed to have designed all but one of the 16 homes in the development. The firm billed him as their "architect", and he toured to collect new designs. He introduced or expanded the use of Spanish Colonial architecture in Little Rock.

He often worked with builder Justin Matthews.

More than a dozen of his works survive and are listed on the National Register of Historic Places.

Some of his work is Bungalow/Craftsman architecture and was covered in a study of Pre-Depression buildings in Edgemont, in Park Hill, in North Little Rock, Arkansas.

Works (and credits) include:

- Cherry House, 217 Dooley Rd., North Little Rock, Arkansas, (Carmean, Frank) NRHP-listed
- Edgemere Street Bridge, Edgemere St., at Lake No. 3, North Little Rock, AR, (Carmean, Frank) NRHP-listed
- Joseph E. England Jr. House, 313 Skyline Dr., North Little Rock, AR, (Carmean, Frank) NRHP-listed
- Jeffries House (North Little Rock, Arkansas), 415 Skyline Dr., North Little Rock, AR, (Carmean, Frank) NRHP-listed
- Kleiber House, 637 Skyline Dr., North Little Rock, AR, (Carmean, Frank) NRHP-listed
- Lake No. 1 Bridge, Avondale Rd., over Lake No. 1, North Little Rock, AR, (Carmean, Frank) NRHP-listed
- Lakeshore Drive Bridge, Lakeshore Dr. at Lake No. 3, North Little Rock, AR, (Carmean, Frank) NRHP-listed
- Matthews House (North Little Rock, Arkansas), 406 Goshen, North Little Rock, AR, (Carmean, Frank) NRHP-listed
- Matthews-Bradshaw House, 524 Skyline Dr., North Little Rock, AR, (Carmean, Frank) NRHP-listed
- Matthews-Bryan House, 320 Dooley Rd., North Little Rock, AR, (Carmean, Frank) NRHP-listed
- Matthews-Dillon House, 701 Skyline Dr., North Little Rock, AR, (Carmean, Frank) NRHP-listed
- Matthews-Godt House, 248 Skyline Dr., North Little Rock, AR, (Carmean, Frank) NRHP-listed
- Matthews-MacFadyen House, 206 Dooley Rd., North Little Rock, AR, (Carmean, Frank) NRHP-listed
- Owings House, 563 Skyline Dr., North Little Rock, AR, (Carmean, Frank) NRHP-listed
- Roundtop Filling Station, Intersection of Roundtop and Trammel Roads, Sherwood, AR, (Carmean, Frank) NRHP-listed
- Waterside Street Bridge, Waterside St. near jct. with Jacksonville Blvd., North Little Rock, AR, (Carmean, Frank)
- Young House (North Little Rock, Arkansas), 436 Skyline Dr., North Little Rock, AR, (Carmean, Frank)
- One or more works in Park Hill Historic District, roughly bounded by Plainview Circle, Crestview Blvd., Ridge St. and H Ave., Pulaski, AR, (Carmean, Frank) NRHP-listed
