= Cherry House =

Cherry House may refer to:

- Cherry House (North Little Rock, Arkansas), listed on the National Register of Historic Places (NRHP)
- Cherry-Luter Estate, North Little Rock, Arkansas, NRHP-listed
- Cherry Hall, Bowling Green, Kentucky, NRHP-listed
- Cherry Hotel, Wilson, North Carolina, NRHP-listed
- Peter L. Cherry House, Astoria, Oregon, NRHP-listed
- Cherry Mansion, Savannah, Tennessee, NRHP-listed

== See also ==
- Cherry Hill (disambiguation)
