= Cherry Hill =

Cherry Hill often refers to:

- Cherry Hill, New Jersey, a township in Camden County, New Jersey
- Cherry Hill, Prince William County, Virginia, a census-designated place

Cherry Hill may also refer to:

== Places ==
=== Canada ===
- Cherry Hill, Nova Scotia, a community

=== United Kingdom ===
- Cherry Hill, Virginia Water, Surrey, England, a listed house

=== United States ===
(by state)

- Cherry Hill, Perry County, Arkansas, an unincorporated community
- Cherry Hill, Polk County, Arkansas, an unincorporated community
- Cherry Hills Village, Colorado, a municipality
- Cherry Hill, Baltimore, Maryland, a neighborhood
- Cherry Hill, Cecil County, Maryland, a village
- Cherry Hill, Michigan, an unincorporated community, or its historic district
- Cherry Hill, Bergen County, New Jersey, an unincorporated community in River Edge, New Jersey
- Cherry Hill Mall, New Jersey, a census-designated place in Cherry Hill, New Jersey
  - Cherry Hill Mall, a shopping mall
- Cherry Hill, New York, a hamlet in the town of Harmony
- Cherry Hill (Albany, New York), a historic house listed on the NRHP
- Cherry Hill Plantation, historic site in Inez, North Carolina
- Cherryhill Township, Indiana County, Pennsylvania
- Cherry Hill (Falls Church, Virginia), a farmhouse listed on the NRHP in Virginia
- Cherry Hill, Roanoke, Virginia, a neighborhood
- Cherry Hill, Seattle, Washington, a neighborhood

== Schools ==
- Cherry Hill Public Schools, Cherry Hill, New Jersey
  - Cherry Hill High School East
  - Cherry Hill High School West
- Cherry Hill Seminary, South Carolina

== Sports ==
- Cherry Hill Arena, Cherry Hill, New Jersey
  - Cherry Hill Rookies, a basketball team
- Cherry Hills Country Club, Cherry Hills Village, Colorado

== Transportation ==
- Cherry Hill station (Baltimore Light Rail), Baltimore, Maryland
- Cherry Hill station (NJ Transit), Cherry Hill, New Jersey

== People ==
- Cherry Hill (author) (born 1947), American equestrian author

== Other uses ==
- Cherry Hill (amusement park) in Fruit Heights, Utah
- Cherry Hill (Central Park), a fountain in Central Park, New York City
- "Cherry Hill Park", a 1969 song by Billy Joe Royal
- Cherry Hill Gang, a 19th-century gang in New York City
- Cherry Hill (model engineer) (1931–2024), English model engineer

== See also ==
- Cherry Hill Road (disambiguation)
