= Roundtop Filling Station =

- U.S. National Register of Historic Places
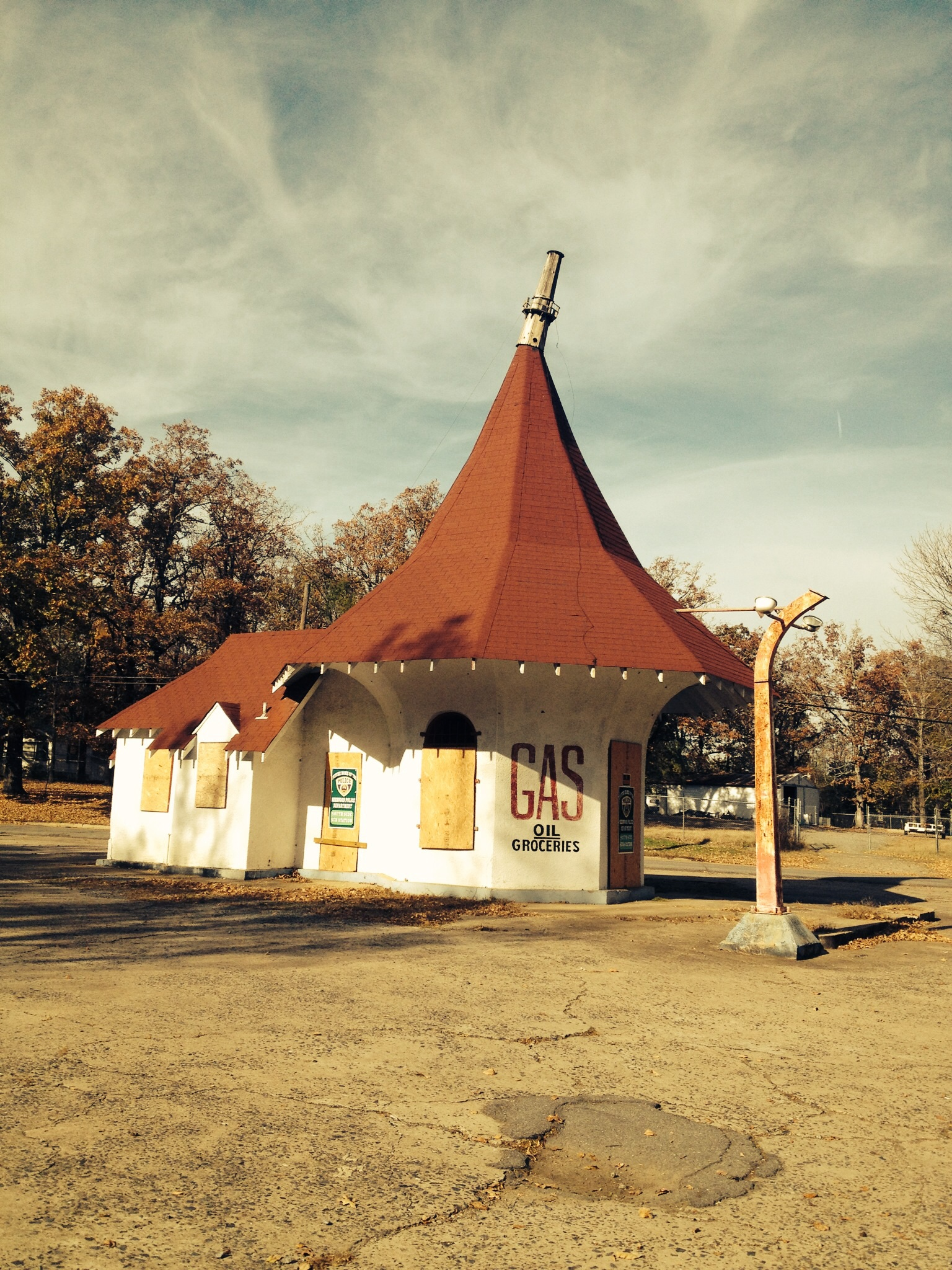

- Location within Arkansas Location within the United States
- Location: Intersection of Roundtop and Trammel Roads, Sherwood, Arkansas
- Coordinates: 34°48′44″N 92°10′42″W
- Area: less than one acre
- Built: 1936
- Built by: The Justin Matthews Company
- Architectural style: Novelty architecture - transportation; American Movement: Bungalow/Craftsman; Late 19th and 20th Century Revival: Mission/Spanish Revival
- MPS: Arkansas Highway History and Architecture, 1910-1965
- NRHP reference No.: 07001432

Significant dates
- Open for Operation: 1936
- Closed for Operation: 1981
- Added to NRHP: 2008

The Roundtop Filling Station, in Sherwood, Arkansas, United States, is one of only two structures in Sherwood to be listed on the National Register of Historic Places, the other being Sylvan Hills Country Club Golf Course.

== Construction ==
The Roundtop Filling Station was built in 1936 by the Justin Matthews Company for the Pierce Oil Company. Pierce Oil was one of the "baby Standards" formed after the U.S. Government's breakup of John D. Rockefeller's Standard Oil Company in 1911. Pierce operated gasoline stations in Arkansas, southern Missouri, western Louisiana, Oklahoma, Texas, and Mexico. In 1936, Pierce Oil contracted the Justin Matthews Company to construct a uniquely shaped gasoline station along U.S. Highway 67. It is believed the structure was designed by Matthews' company architect, Frank Carmean, and was built by brothers C.C. and Powderley Eubanks.

== History ==
Wallace David "Happy" Williford, a senior at Jacksonville High School in Jacksonville, Arkansas, and employee at another Pierce-owned station in Jacksonville, was asked by the company to come operate the new service station. Williford agreed and worked at the station before and after attending school. Williford paid men to operate the station for him during school hours, but says it was hard finding men who would only work for $3.50 a week. For rent, Pierce charged Williford two cents per gallon of gas sold. Prior to 1941, the station had no electric gas pumps, and Williford and his employees had to hand pump the gas up into the glass bowl before filling each car's tank.

Around 1940, the Roundtop became a Sinclair station, after Pierce Oil was purchased by the Sinclair Oil Company. Around this time, electric pumps were installed Some time in the early 1950s, Sinclair sold many of their Arkansas stations, including the Roundtop, to the Phillips Petroleum Company, and the station became a Phillips 66 branded station. In the 1970s, the station would become a DX branded station, and at the time it closed in 1981, it was a Sunoco branded station due to Sun Oil Company's acquisition of DX.

By 1957, Williford had saved up enough money to purchase the station for $8,000. With business booming, Willford would open up another gas station at the foot of the Broadway Bridge in North Little Rock (Pulaski County), near the site of present-day Dickey-Stephens Park. Williford later closed that station and opened another at 914 East Broadway in North Little Rock. During this time, Williford leased the Roundtop to others. He returned to the Roundtop in the mid-1970s and operated it exclusively until he retired and closed the business in 1981.

In 1989, Wayne Ball, a local auctioneer, coincidentally, a former station employee from his youth, conducted the auction of the Roundtop on behalf of Williford. The winning bidder was George E. Brown, a North Little Rock businessman. Brown planned to renovate the then dilapidated building; however before this could happen, Brown died, and, in 1999, his heirs donated the station to the City of Sherwood, which had annexed the area in 1975.

In 2010, the Roundtop was featured in "The Last Ride," a film about Hank Williams, Sr., directed by Arkansas native Harry Thomasson. The scenes filmed at Roundtop include, several of the Williams character, his young chauffeur, Silas, and his love interest.

== Restoration ==
For years, the gas station-turned-landmark sat abandoned, and, over time, was the victim of vandalism and theft. In the mid-2000s, Linda Nickle, Sherwood's former Economic Development Director, advocated for the restoration of the station and ultimately caused it to be listed on the National Register of Historic Places in 2008.

In January, 2013, Sherwood Mayor Virginia Hillman, appointed Joey Marks, an employee of the Department of Arkansas Heritage and lifelong resident of Sherwood, to chair the first Sherwood History and Heritage Committee. Marks began working to obtain grant money to aid in the restoration of the Roundtop. On June 5, 2013, the City of Sherwood was notified by the Office of Arkansas Governor Mike Beebe that Sherwood had received a $50,000 historic preservation grant for the Roundtop project from the Arkansas Historic Preservation Program of the Department of Arkansas Heritage.

The committee is considering a restoration of the gas station to its original condition and converting it into a Sherwood Police substation.

== Fire ==
On November 2, 2014, a fire damaged the building's exterior, just days before it was set to reopen to the public. The Sherwood police recorded it as an arson attempt.

== See also ==
- National Register of Historic Places listings in Pulaski County, Arkansas
