= Justin Matthews Jr. House =

Historic house in Arkansas, United States

- U.S. National Register of Historic Places
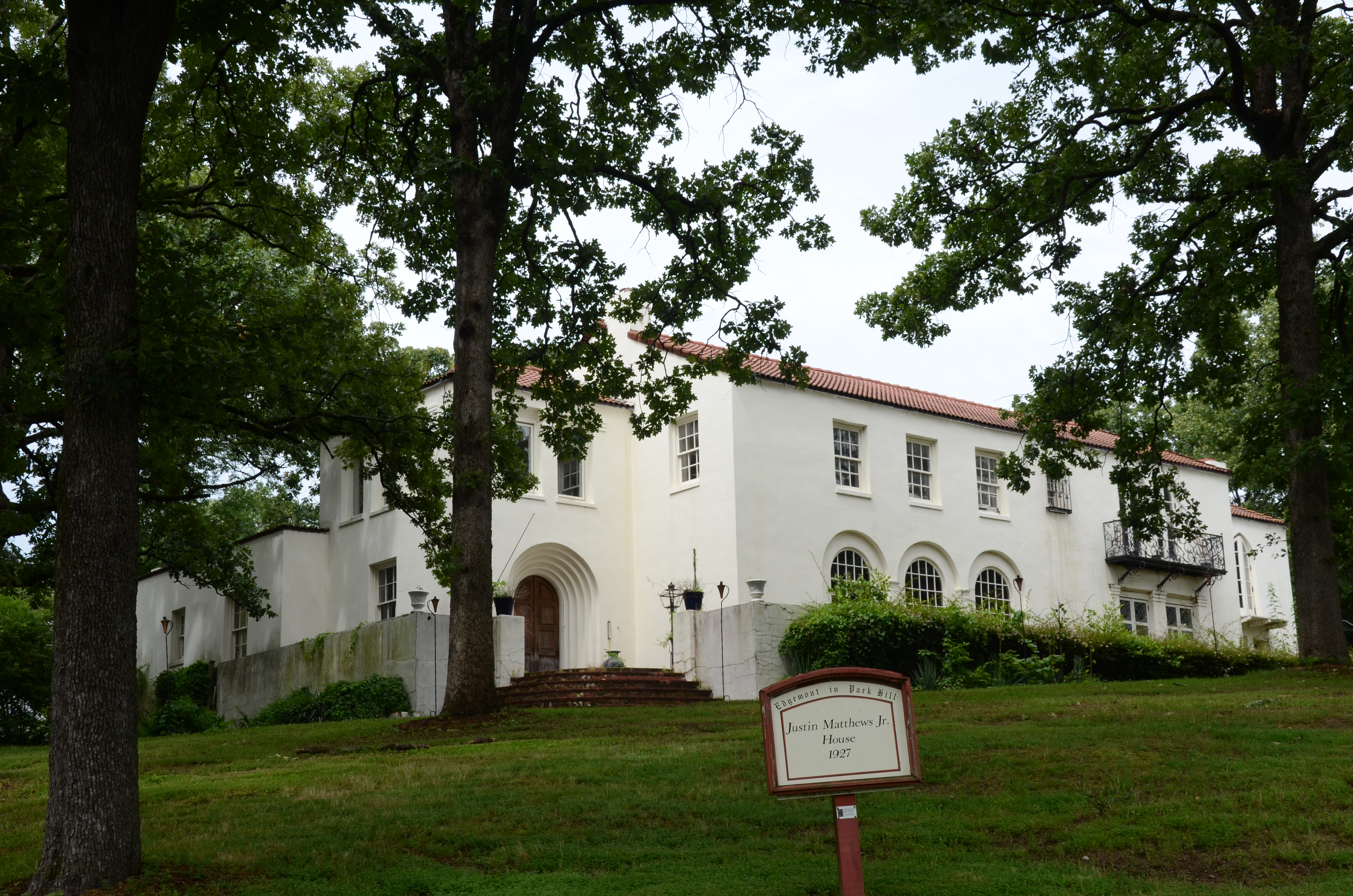

- Location within Arkansas Location within the United States
- Location: 257 Skyline Dr., North Little Rock, Arkansas
- Coordinates: 34°46′54″N 92°15′30″W
- Area: less than one acre
- Built: 1928
- Built by: Justin Matthews Co.
- Architect: Max F. Meyer
- Architectural style: Mission/Spanish Revival, Mediterranean
- NRHP reference No.: 90001933
- Added to NRHP: December 18, 1990

The Justin Matthews Jr. House is a historic house at 257 Skyline Drive in North Little Rock, Arkansas. It is a large two story Mediterranean Revival house, designed by Little Rock architect Max F. Meyer and built in 1928. It has all of the hallmarks of this style, including a red tile roof, stuccoed walls, arched openings for doors and windows, and wrought iron grillwork. The house was built for the son of developer Justin Matthews in his Park Hill development.

The house was listed on the National Register of Historic Places in 1990.

== See also ==
- National Register of Historic Places listings in Pulaski County, Arkansas
