= Mathews House =

Mathews House can refer to:
(sorted by state, then city/town)

- Mathews House (Paonia, Colorado), listed on the National Register of Historic Places (NRHP) in Delta County, Colorado
- Lockwood–Mathews Mansion, Norwalk, Connecticut, a National Historic Landmark listed on the NRHP in Fairfield County, Connecticut
- John Frank Mathews Plantation, Prattsburg, Georgia, listed on the NRHP in Talbot County, Georgia
- Courtney Mathews House, Lexington, Kentucky, listed on the NRHP in Fayette County, Kentucky
- Nathan Mathews House and Mathews Cotton Gin, West Point, Mississippi, listed on the NRHP in Clay County, Mississippi
- David Mathews House, Hoosick, New York, listed on the NRHP in Rensselaer County, New York and Bennington County, Vermont
- Mathews House (Painesville, Ohio), listed on the NRHP in Lake County, Ohio
- Nelson and Margret Mathews House, Coburg, Oregon, listed on the NRHP in Lane County, Oregon
- G. A. Mathews House, Brookings, South Dakota, listed on the NRHP in Sanborn County, South Dakota
- Mathews–Powell House, Queen City, Texas, listed on the NRHP in Cass County, Texas

== See also ==
- Matthews House (disambiguation)
