= Edgemere Street Bridge =

- U.S. National Register of Historic Places
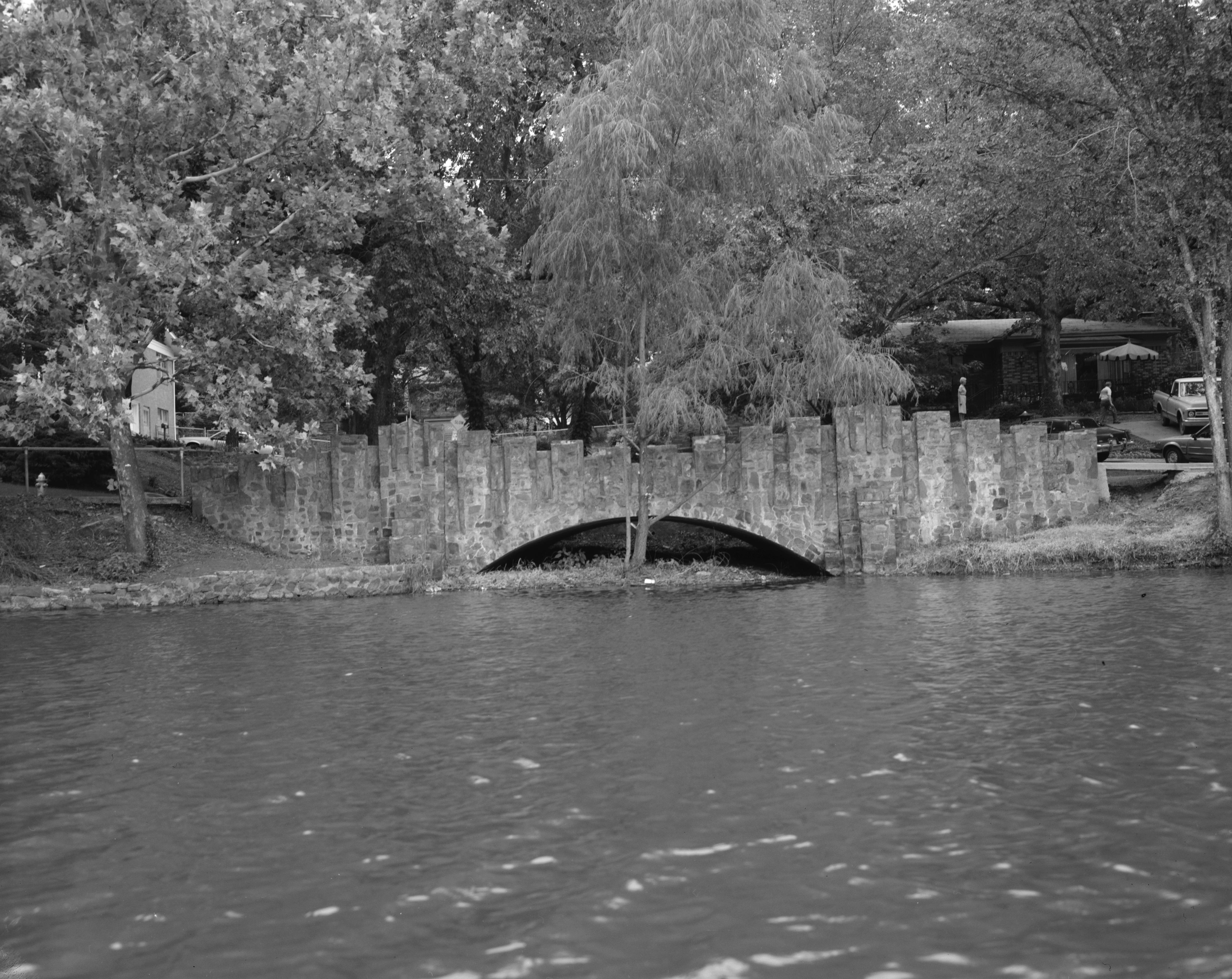
- HAER photo, 1988

- Location within Arkansas Location within the United States
- Location: Edgemere Street at Lake No. 3, North Little Rock, Arkansas
- Coordinates: 34°47′40″N 92°15′0″W
- Area: less than one acre
- Built by: Metropolitan Trust Company
- Architect: Frank Carmean
- Architectural style: Closed-spandrel deck arch
- MPS: Historic Bridges of Arkansas MPS
- NRHP reference No.: 90000533
- Added to NRHP: April 9, 1990

The Edgemere Street Bridge is a historic bridge in North Little Rock, Arkansas. It carries Edgemere Street over a small part of Lakewood Lake Number Three. It is a masonry structure with closed spandrels, and has a span of about 18 feet (5.5 m) and a total length of 57 feet (17 m). It is built out of rustic, roughly squared fieldstone, that is laid in uncoursed fashion. Vertical columns project from either side of the spandrels, rising above the deck level to form a decorative parapet. It was built, along with the similar Lakeshore Drive Bridge as part of the innovative Lakewood Development project of developer Justin Matthews in the 1930s.

The bridge was listed on the National Register of Historic Places in 1990.

== See also ==
- List of bridges documented by the Historic American Engineering Record in Arkansas
- List of bridges on the National Register of Historic Places in Arkansas
- National Register of Historic Places listings in Pulaski County, Arkansas
