= Sylvan Hills Country Club Golf Course =

- U.S. National Register of Historic Places
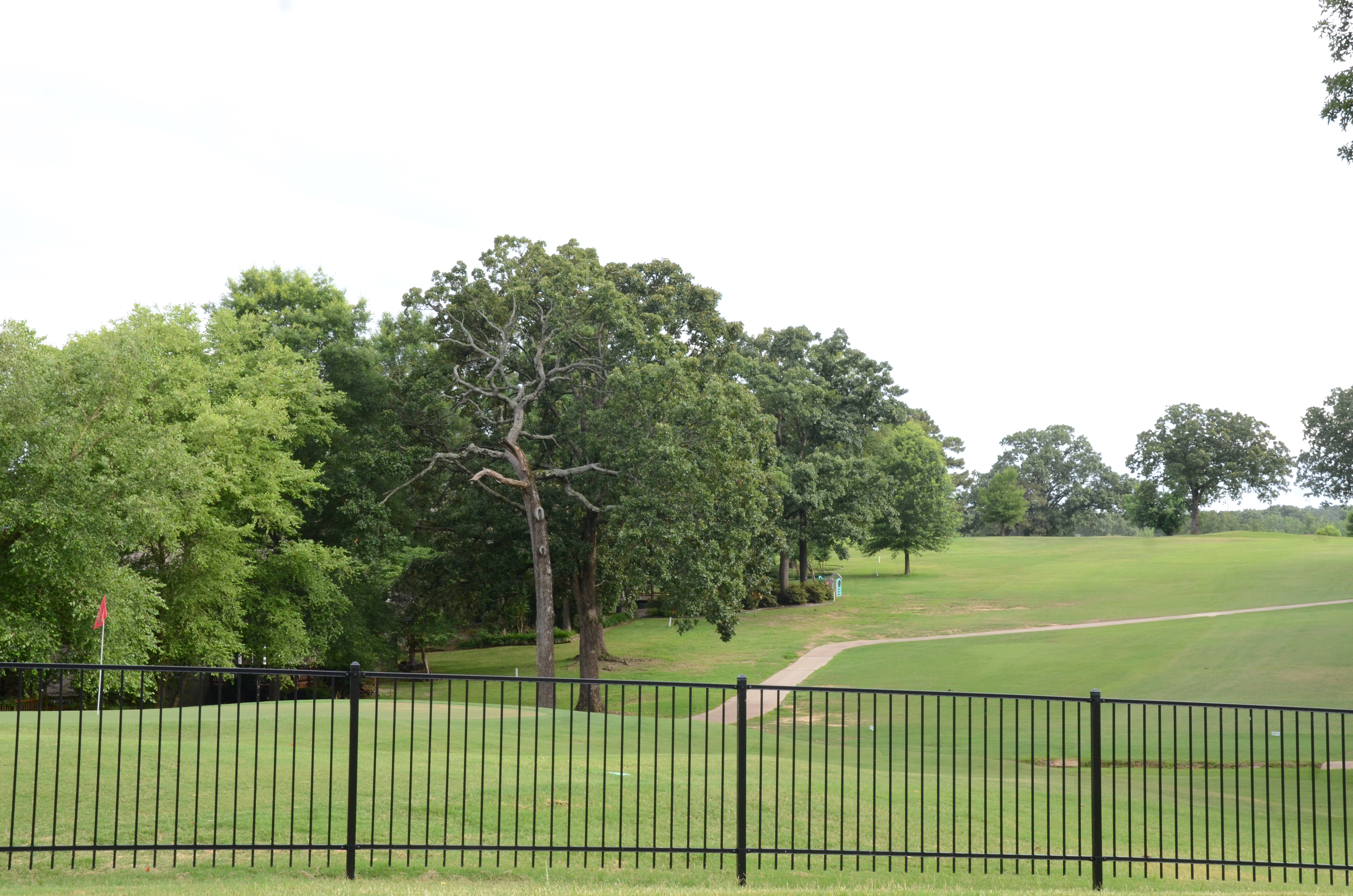

- Location within Arkansas Location within the United States
- Location: Intersection of Club and Country Club Roads, Sherwood, Arkansas
- Coordinates: 34°49′19″N 92°13′48″W
- Area: 120 acres (49 ha)
- Built: 1927
- Architect: Justin Matthews
- Architectural style: Recreation
- MPS: Arkansas Highway History and Architecture, 1910-1965
- NRHP reference No.: 10000289

Significant dates
- Operated as "North Hills Country Club": 1956 to May 2007
- Closed for Operation: May 2007
- Added to NRHP: 2010

The Greens at North Hills Municipal Golf Course is a municipal golf course located in Sherwood, Arkansas, United States. Construction of the 120 acres (49 ha) golf course began in 1927 during the "golden era" of golf course design.

Originally named the Sylvan Hills Country Club Golf Course and developed by the Justin Matthews Co., the course was added to the National Register of Historic Places in 2010 due to its local significance and association with entertainment and recreation, From 1956 through May 2007, the golf course was named the North Hills Country Club.

== Sources ==
- Bradburn, Cary. On the Opposite Shore: The Making of North Little Rock. Marceline, MO: Walsworth Publishing Company, 2004.
- Robert. L.A Adams, and John F. Ronney, Jr., "Evolution of American Golf Facilities," Geographical Review 75. Oct. 1985.
- Metropolitan Trust Company, "We Recommend for Investment" In the files of the Arkansas Historic Preservation Program.
- Pulaski County Deed Record Book 324, pg. 497
- Pulaski County: Warranty Deed #51109; 3-19-1927.
