= Cherry Hill Road =

Cherry Hill Road is a common road name in English-speaking places, including:

- Cherry Hill Road (Calverton–College Park, Maryland)
- Cherry Hill Road (Baltimore)
- Cherry Hill Road (Reisterstown, Maryland)
- Cherry Hill Road (Philippi, West Virginia)
- Cherry Hill Road (Parsippany, New Jersey), exit 42 off Interstate 80

== See also ==
- Cherry Hill (disambiguation)
