= Cherry Hill Fountain =

Water fountain in New York City's Central Park

Coordinates: 40°46′28.9″N 73°58′21.7″W

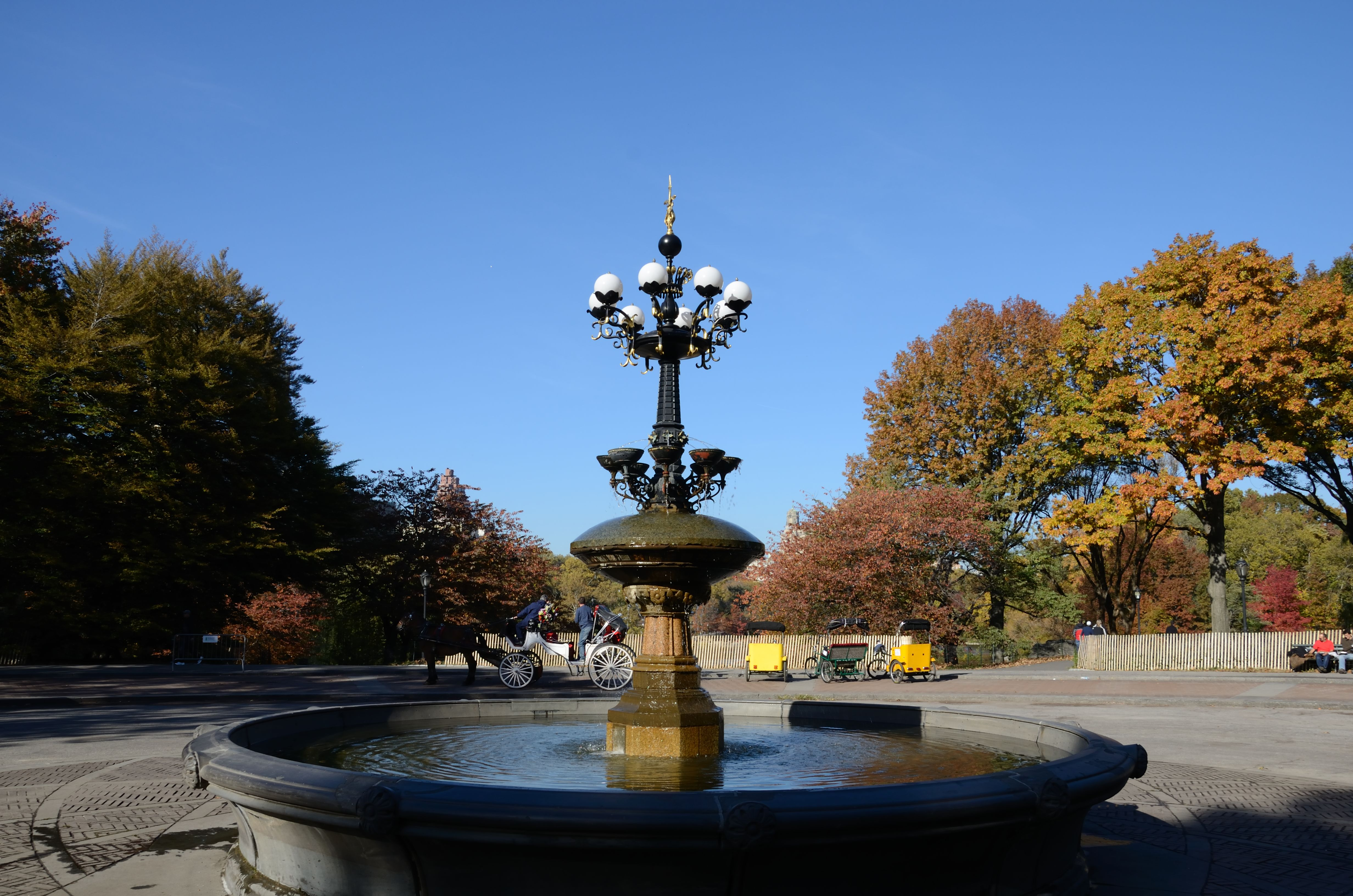
Cherry Hill Fountain, Central Park

Notable buildings and structures of Central Park. Click on the map and then on the points for details.
'"`UNIQ--templatestyles-00000001-QINU`"''"`UNIQ--templatestyles-00000002-QINU`"'

Cherry Hill Fountain is a water fountain in New York City's Central Park. It is located just to the west of Bethesda Fountain, enclosed in a circular plaza in Cherry Hill. Designed by Jacob Wrey Mould and dedicated in the 1860s, the ornamental structure was originally designed as a watering trough for horses during the 19th century. The fountain consists of a granite dome and sculpted bluestone basin, measuring 20 feet (6.1 m) in diameter and inset with Minton tiles. The fountain is topped by a finial with eight frosted round glass lamps and a golden spire. Only the stone base was completed as part of the original design; the finial was added in 1981.

In 1998, with funds donated by Elizabeth and Clement Moore, the Central Park Conservancy restored the fountain to working condition. Cherry Hill, including its fountain, was closed for another renovation in 2011, and it reopened the following year.

The fountain is often mistaken by park visitors for one used in the opening theme of the television show Friends, on the Warner Bros. Ranch Lot in Burbank, California.
