= Matthews-Dillon House =

Historic house in Arkansas, United States

- U.S. National Register of Historic Places
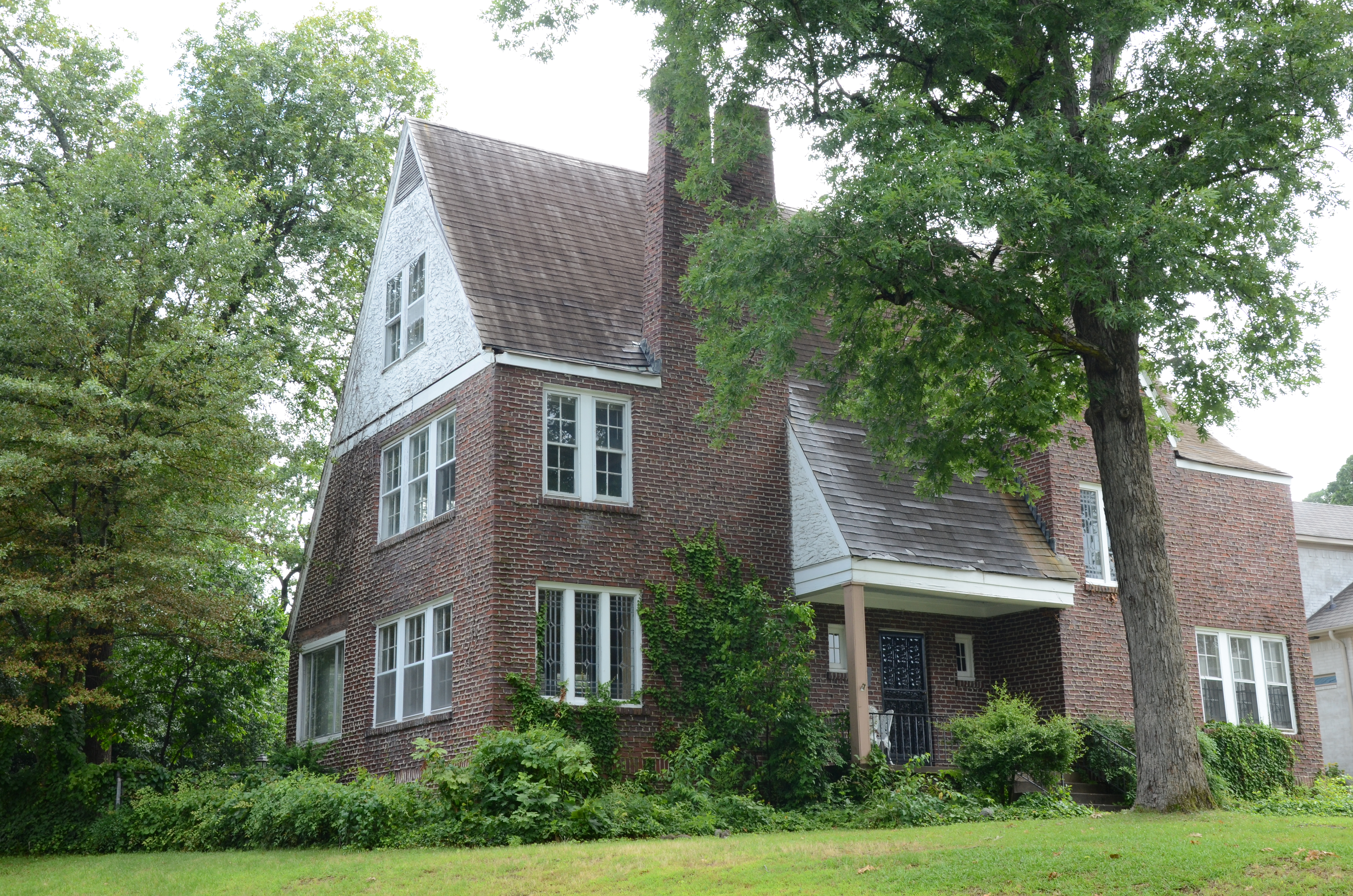

- Location within Arkansas Location within the United States
- Location: 701 Skyline Dr., North Little Rock, Arkansas
- Coordinates: 34°46′55″N 92°15′21″W
- Area: less than one acre
- Built: 1928
- Built by: Justin Matthews
- Architect: Frank Carmean
- Architectural style: Late 19th And 20th Century Revivals, English Revival
- MPS: Pre-Depression Houses and Outbuildings of Edgemont in Park Hill MPS
- NRHP reference No.: 92000563
- Added to NRHP: June 1, 1992

The Matthews-Dillon House is a historic house at 701 Skyline Drive in North Little Rock, Arkansas. It is a 2 1/2-story brick building, with a steeply pitched gable roof in a saltbox profile. The roof is continued over a small front porch, with flush-set chimneys to its left and a gabled projection to its right. The house was built in 1928 by the Justin Matthews Company, to a design by company architect Frank Carmean. The house is locally unusual for its evocation of colonial New England architectural style, executed as a brick variant of medieval English architecture.

The house was listed on the National Register of Historic Places in 1992.

== See also ==
- National Register of Historic Places listings in Pulaski County, Arkansas
