= Sherwood, Arkansas =

- City
- Flag Logo

- Location of Sherwood in Pulaski County, Arkansas.

- Location in Arkansas
- Coordinates: 34°52′31″N 92°11′52″W
- Country: United States
- State: Arkansas
- County: Pulaski
- Incorporated (city): April 22, 1948

Government
  - Type: Mayor–council

Area
  - Total: 21.15 sq mi (54.79 km^{2})
  - Land: 20.75 sq mi (53.73 km^{2})
  - Water: 0.41 sq mi (1.06 km^{2})
- Elevation: 331 ft (101 m)

Population (2020)
  - Total: 32,731
  - Estimate (2025): 33,620 ▲
  - Density: 1,577.9/sq mi (609.22/km^{2})
- Time zone: UTC−6 (Central (CST))
  - Summer (DST): UTC−5 (CDT)
- ZIP code: 72120
- Area code: 501
- FIPS code: 05-63800
- GNIS feature ID: 2405460
- Website: www.sherwoodar.gov

Sherwood is a city in Pulaski County, Arkansas, United States. As of the 2020 census, the population of the city was 32,731, making it the 13th most populous city in Arkansas. It is part of the Little Rock-North Little Rock-Conway metropolitan area with 699,757 people according to the 2010 census.

== History ==
Sherwood was officially incorporated as a town on April 22, 1948. Sherwood moved to a city of Second Class on September 16, 1957, and subsequently as a city of First Class on April 30, 1971.

On March 31, 2023, a damaging tornado passed through Sherwood causing damage. The tornado originally touched down near Little Rock, before it continued on a path which went through Sherwood.

Gravel Ridge was a census-designated place in Pulaski County that was annexed into the city of Sherwood in 2008. Gravel Ridge had a population of 3,232 and total area of 1.9 square miles (4.9 km^{2}), as of the 2000 census. In a 2008 special election, Gravel Ridge was annexation by Sherwood.

In 2009, $219,913 was stolen from the city's checking account through an unauthorized online electronic transfer.

In 2016, a local judge and the city faced a lawsuit after being accused of sending debtors to jail.

== Geography ==
According to the United States Census Bureau, the city has a total area of 20.8 square miles (54.0 km^{2}), of which 20.6 square miles (53.4 km^{2}) is land and 0.23 square miles (0.6 km^{2}), or 1.15%, is water.

=== Climate ===
Sherwood lies in the humid subtropical climate zone (Köppen Cfa). Sherwood experiences all four seasons and does receive cold air masses from the north. July is the hottest month of the year, with an average high of 92 °F (33 °C) and an average low of 73 °F (23 °C). Temperatures above 100 °F (37.8 °C) are somewhat common. January is the coldest month with an average high of 50 °F (10 °C) and an average low of 33 °F (1 °C). The city's highest temperature was 110 °F (43.3 °C), recorded in July 1986. The lowest temperature recorded was −6 °F (−21.1 °C), in January 1985.

Climate data for Sherwood, Arkansas (1981–2010 normals)
Month	Jan	Feb	Mar	Apr	May	Jun	Jul	Aug	Sep	Oct	Nov	Dec	Year
Record high °F (°C)	81 (27)	83 (28)	87 (31)	94 (34)	98 (37)	102 (39)	110 (43)	105 (41)	102 (39)	92 (33)	84 (29)	78 (26)	110 (43)
Mean daily maximum °F (°C)	50 (10)	55 (13)	64 (18)	73 (23)	80 (27)	88 (31)	92 (33)	92 (33)	84 (29)	73 (23)	62 (17)	51 (11)	72 (22)
Mean daily minimum °F (°C)	33 (1)	37 (3)	44 (7)	53 (12)	62 (17)	69 (21)	73 (23)	72 (22)	65 (18)	54 (12)	44 (7)	35 (2)	53 (12)
Record low °F (°C)	−6 (−21)	4 (−16)	14 (−10)	30 (−1)	40 (4)	52 (11)	60 (16)	53 (12)	41 (5)	27 (−3)	14 (−10)	−2 (−19)	−6 (−21)
Average precipitation inches (mm)	3.42 (87)	3.80 (97)	4.77 (121)	4.79 (122)	4.96 (126)	3.31 (84)	3.81 (97)	2.80 (71)	3.31 (84)	4.80 (122)	5.39 (137)	5.01 (127)	50.17 (1,274)
Source: The Weather Channel

== Demographics ==
Historical population
Census	Pop.	Note	%±
1950	717		—
1960	1,222		70.4%
1970	2,754		125.4%
1980	10,423		278.5%
1990	18,893		81.3%
2000	21,511		13.9%
2010	29,523		37.2%
2020	32,731		10.9%
2025 (est.)	33,620	▲	2.7%
U.S. Decennial Census

=== 2020 census ===
As of the 2020 census, Sherwood had a population of 32,731, 13,764 households, and 8,324 families. The median age was 39.9 years. 22.8% of residents were under the age of 18 and 17.8% were 65 years of age or older. For every 100 females there were 89.7 males, and for every 100 females age 18 and over there were 86.0 males age 18 and over.

95.4% of residents lived in urban areas, while 4.6% lived in rural areas.

There were 13,764 households in Sherwood, of which 30.8% had children under the age of 18 living in them. Of all households, 46.6% were married-couple households, 17.4% were households with a male householder and no spouse or partner present, and 31.3% were households with a female householder and no spouse or partner present. About 29.6% of all households were made up of individuals and 11.5% had someone living alone who was 65 years of age or older.

There were 14,799 housing units, of which 7.0% were vacant. The homeowner vacancy rate was 1.9% and the rental vacancy rate was 9.8%.

Racial composition as of the 2020 census
Race	Number	Percent
White	20,426	62.4%
Black or African American	8,265	25.3%
American Indian and Alaska Native	156	0.5%
Asian	651	2.0%
Native Hawaiian and Other Pacific Islander	14	0.0%
Some other race	864	2.6%
Two or more races	2,355	7.2%
Hispanic or Latino (of any race)	1,831	5.6%

=== 2010 census ===
As of the census of 2010, there were 29,523 people, 12,207 households, and 8,314 families residing in the city. The racial makeup of the city was 75.3% White, 18.5% Black or African American, 0.5% Native American, 1.6% Asian, 0.1% Pacific Islander, 1.6% from other races, and 2.4% from two or more races. 4.0% of the population were Hispanic or Latino of any race.

There were 12,207 households, out of which 30.5% had children under the age of 18 living with them, 50.6% were married couples living together, 13.9% had a female householder with no husband present, and 31.9% were non-families. 27.0% of all households were made up of individuals, and 21.9% had someone living alone who was 65 years of age or older. The average household size was 2.41 and the average family size was 2.92.

=== 2000 census ===
As of the census of 2000, there were 21,511 people, 8,798 households, and 6,211 families residing in the city. The population density was 1,557.9 inhabitants per square mile (601.5/km^{2}). There were 9,272 housing units at an average density of 671.5 per square mile (259.3/km^{2}). The racial makeup of the city was 80.23% White, 17.83% Black or African American, 0.43% Native American, 0.95% Asian, 0.06% Pacific Islander, 0.83% from other races, and 1.24% from two or more races. 2.05% of the population were Hispanic or Latino of any race.

There were 8,798 households, out of which 32.6% had children under the age of 18 living with them, 57.4% were married couples living together, 10.4% had a female householder with no husband present, and 29.4% were non-families. 24.6% of all households were made up of individuals, and 6.4% had someone living alone who was 65 years of age or older. The average household size was 2.42 and the average family size was 2.90.

In the city, the population was spread out, with 24.5% under the age of 18, 8.5% from 18 to 24, 32.0% from 25 to 44, 24.4% from 45 to 64, and 10.7% who were 65 years of age or older. The median age was 36 years. For every 100 females, there were 94.5 males. For every 100 females age 18 and over, there were 90.5 males.

The median income for a household in the city was $44,838, and the median income for a family was $51,510. Males had a median income of $34,133 versus $25,757 for females. The per capita income for the city was $21,515. In Sherwood, 6.3% of the population and 5.4% of families were below the poverty line. In addition, 9.7% of those under the age of 18 and 4.2% of those 65 and older were living below the poverty line.

== Economy ==
Major employers include customer contact centers for FTD.com and Cardinal Health. Another major employer is CHI St Vincent's North Hospital. In 2017, there were 569 employer firms in the city of Sherwood. 304 of those employer firms were men-owned and 139 of them were women-owned.

== Arts and culture ==
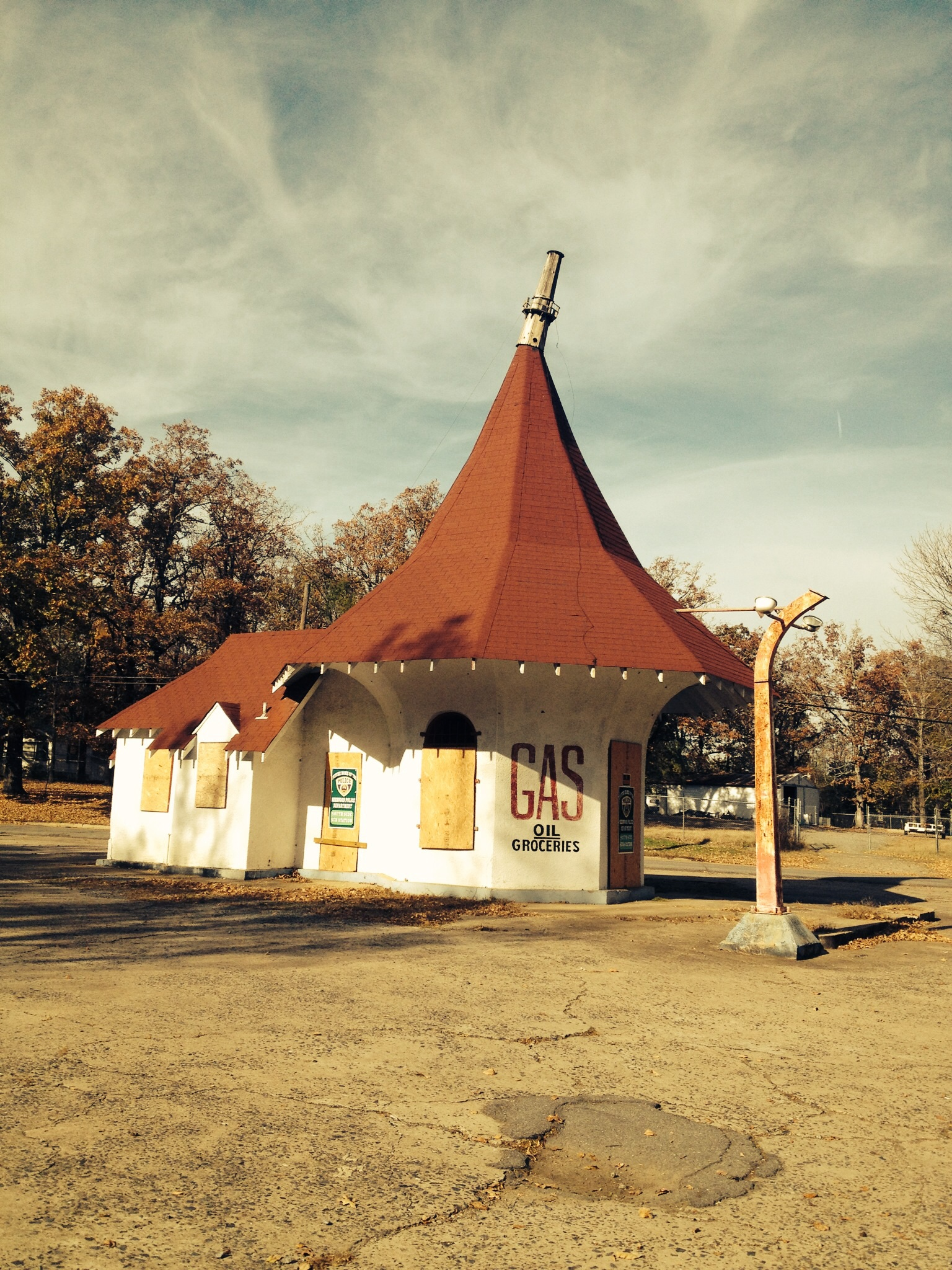
Roundtop Filling Station

=== Places of interest ===
The Roundtop Filling Station is a historic gasoline filling station listed on the National Register of Historic Places.

=== Library ===
The Central Arkansas Library System includes the Amy Sanders Library in Sherwood, which is a 9,800 square feet (910 m^{2}) facility that offers a variety of books, DVDs, public computers, and wireless Internet access. The library, named in 1988 in honor of Amy Sanders, Sherwood's city clerk for more than 14 years, offers numerous children's programs.

== Parks and recreation ==
In this list are the 14 parks currently located within Sherwood.

Sylvan Hills Country Club Golf Course is listed on the National Register of Historic Place.

== Government ==
The City of Sherwood is an incorporated municipality (city of the first class) with a Mayor elected to a four-year term, and eight elected aldermen, a city clerk, and a part-time city attorney.

The Sherwood Mayor serves four-year terms, with election held during the November midterm elections. Mayor Mary Jo Heye-Townsell was sworn in on January 1, 2023.

== Education ==
=== Public schools ===
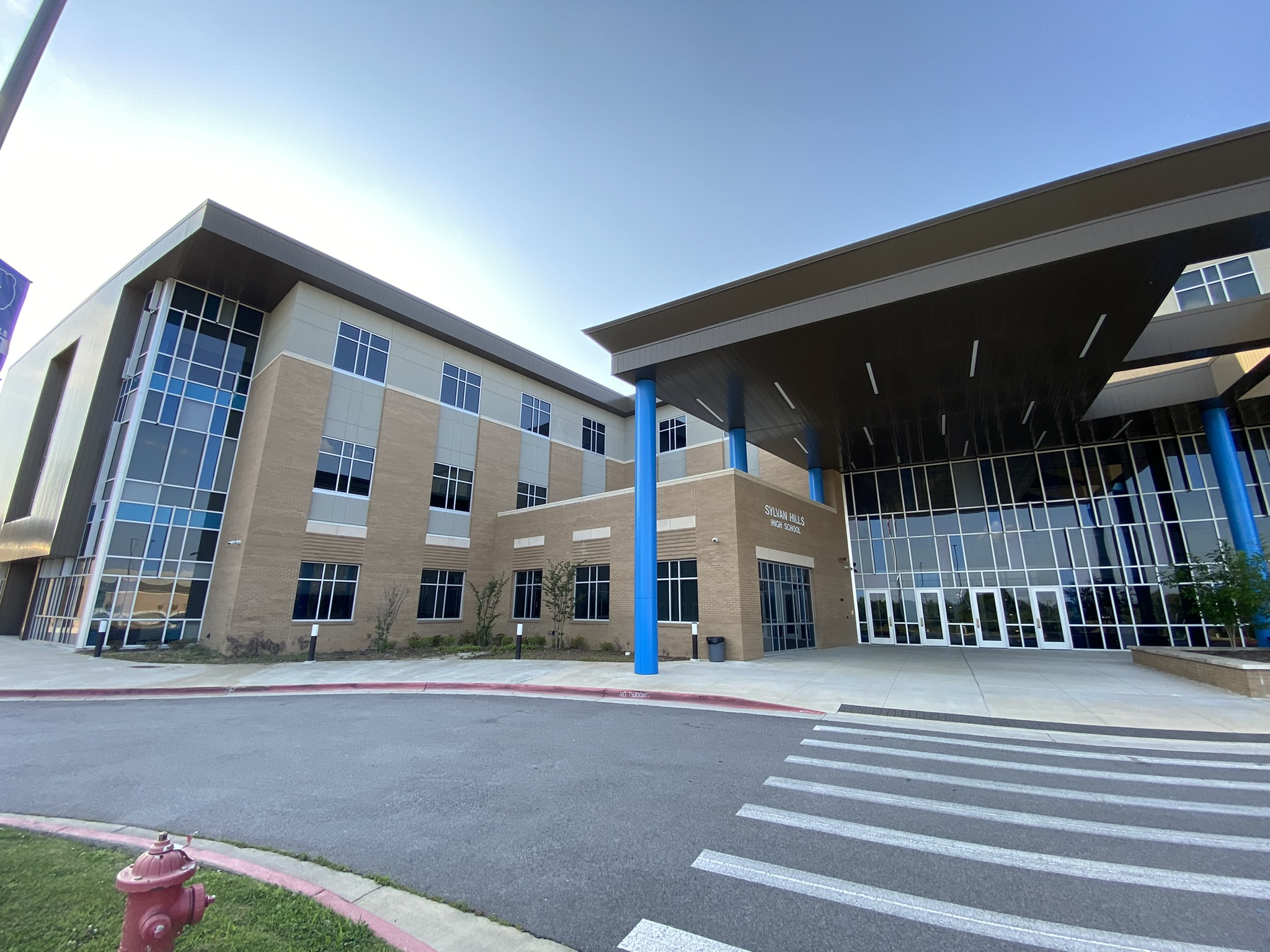
Sylvan Hills High School

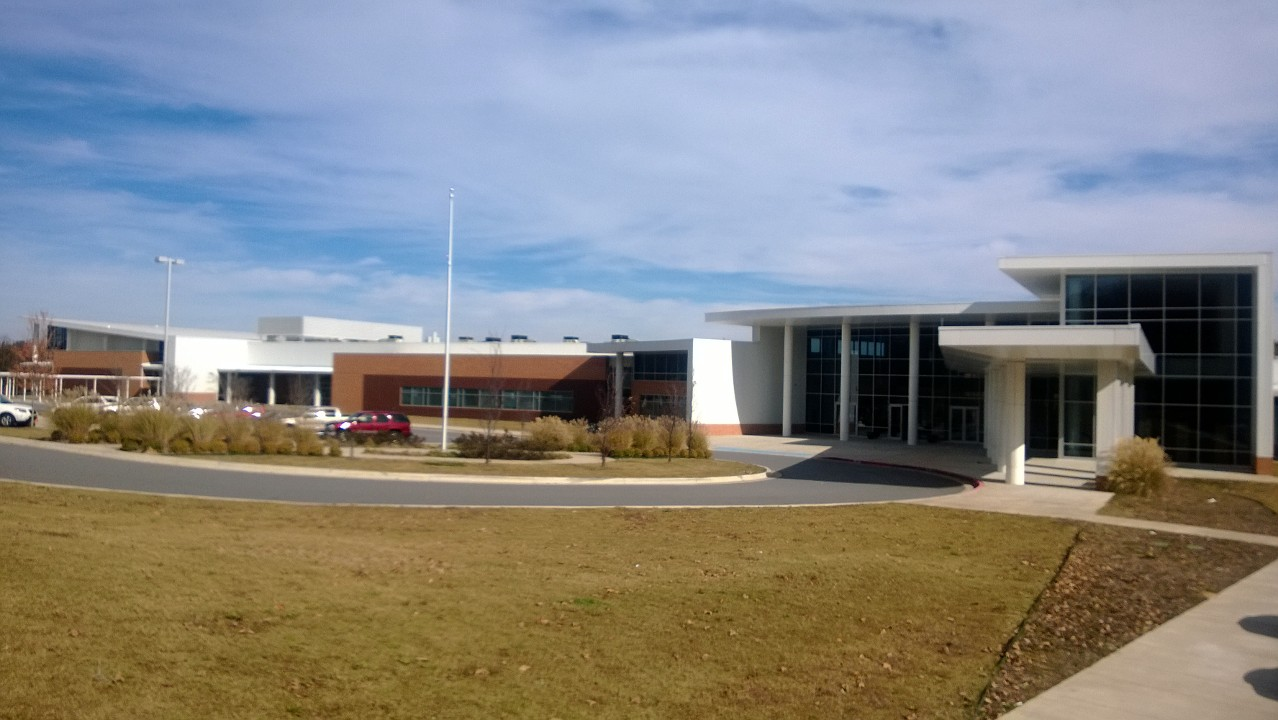
Sylvan Hills Junior High School

Public education is administered by the Pulaski County Special School District. Schools located in Sherwood include:

- Cato Elementary
- Oakbrooke Elementary
- Sherwood Elementary
- Sylvan Hills Elementary
- William J. Clinton Elementary
- Sylvan Hills High School
- Sylvan Hills Junior High

=== Private schools ===
- Abundant Life Christian Academy
- Victory Baptist Elementary School, which was founded as a segregation academy
- Central Arkansas Christian Schools
- Immaculate Conception Catholic School

== Media ==
The Sherwood Voice is a local weekly newspaper.

Radio stations in Sherwood include KOKY (102.1 FM) that plays an urban adult contemporary format, and KMTL (760 AM) that features a religious format.

== Infrastructure ==
=== Transportation ===
==== Highways ====
- Interstate 57
- U.S. Route 67
- U.S. Route 167
- Arkansas Highway 107

=== Healthcare ===
St. Vincent Rehabilitation Hospital serves as a 60-bed acute rehabilitation hospital.

CHI St Vincent's North Hospital is a non-profit 69 bed hospital with an emergency department that sees about 20,000 patients per year. The hospital is classified as a Level IV Trauma Center by the State of Arkansas. Services offered include Emergency Medicine, General Surgery, Orthopedic Surgery, and Internal Medicine including critical care. Outpatient services include lab, radiology, as well as clinics for GI medicine and Neurology.

=== Public safety ===
The Sherwood Police Department was founded 1964. According to the city's website, Sherwood has the lowest crime rate in Arkansas.

The Sherwood Fire Department was founded in 1950. The city has formed an Office of Emergency Management to respond in cases of natural or man-made disasters.

== Notable people ==
- Joey Lauren Adams, actress and director
- Wes Bentley, film actor
- John Burkhalter, businessman and Democratic politician
- Kelly George, Miss Arkansas USA 2007
- Jeff Henderson, world-class long jump and sprinter
- David Kerr, baseball executive, General Manager of Mississippi Mud Monsters
- Mark Lowery, member of the Arkansas House of Representatives from Pulaski County since 2013
- Kevin McReynolds, professional baseball player
- Bryce Mitchell, UFC featherweight contender
- Mathew Pitsch, Republican member of the Arkansas House of Representatives
- Christina Marie Riggs, a woman who killed her children, later executed by lethal injection
- Jennifer Sherrill, Miss Arkansas USA 2004
- Terry Tiffee, professional baseball player
- Ashur Tolliver, professional baseball player
- Harry Vines, coach of Arkansas Rollin' Razorbacks
