= Jeffries House (North Little Rock, Arkansas) =

Historic house in Arkansas, United States

- U.S. National Register of Historic Places
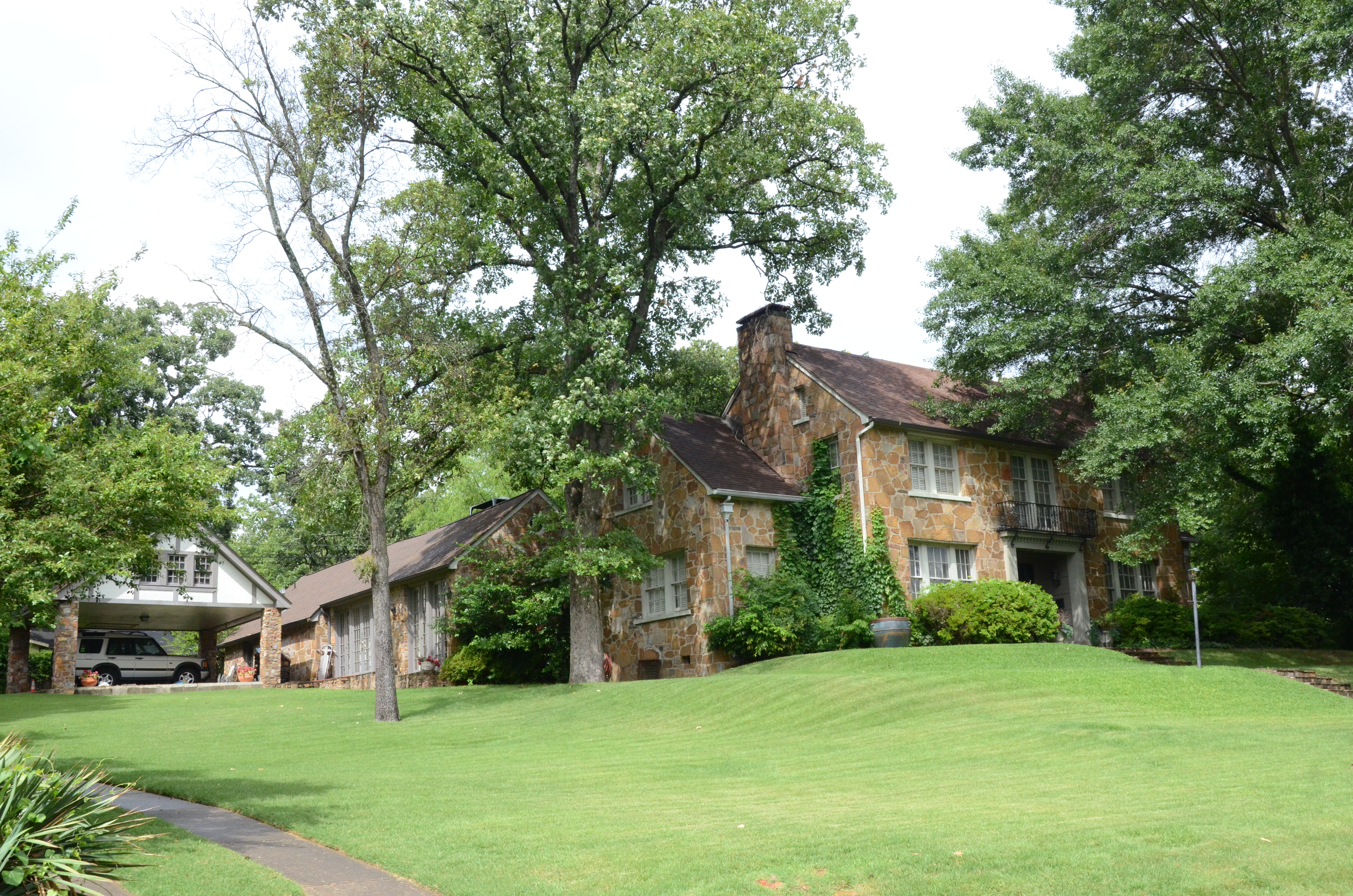

- Location within Arkansas Location within the United States
- Location: 415 Skyline Dr., North Little Rock, Arkansas
- Coordinates: 34°46′50″N 92°15′21″W
- Area: less than one acre
- Built: 1928
- Built by: Justin Matthews Co.
- Architect: Frank Carmean
- Architectural style: Colonial Revival
- MPS: Pre-Depression Houses and Outbuildings of Edgemont in Park Hill MPS
- NRHP reference No.: 92000567
- Added to NRHP: June 1, 1992

The Jeffries House is a historic house at 415 Skyline Drive in North Little Rock, Arkansas. It is a 2 1/2-story wood-frame structure, finished in a fieldstone veneer, and is three bays wide, with a side-gable roof, end chimneys, and symmetrical single-story wings at the sides. The house is distinctive as a fine example of Colonial Revival architecture, rendered in the unusual veneered stone finish. Built in 1931 by the Justin Matthews Company, it was the last house Matthews built in the Edgemont subdivision before the Great Depression brought the development to an end.

The house was listed on the National Register of Historic Places in 1992.

== See also ==
- National Register of Historic Places listings in Pulaski County, Arkansas
