= Matthews-Bradshaw House =

Historic house in Arkansas, United States

- U.S. National Register of Historic Places
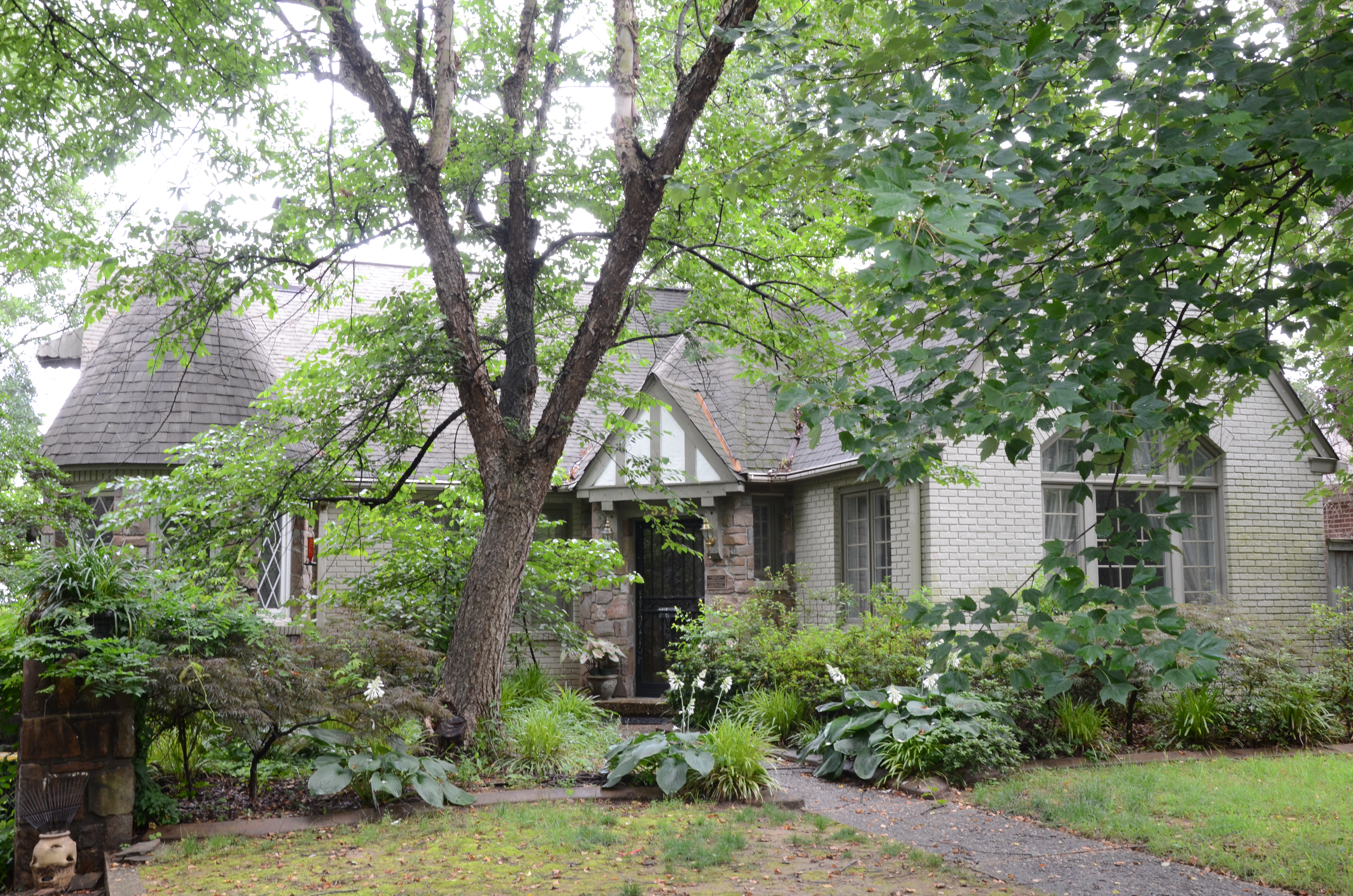

- Location within Arkansas Location within the United States
- Location: 524 Skyline Dr., North Little Rock, Arkansas
- Coordinates: 34°46′47″N 92°15′17″W
- Area: less than one acre
- Built: 1929
- Built by: Justin Matthews
- Architect: Frank Carmean
- Architectural style: Late 19th And 20th Century Revivals, French Eclectic
- MPS: Pre-Depression Houses and Outbuildings of Edgemont in Park Hill MPS
- NRHP reference No.: 92000568
- Added to NRHP: June 1, 1992

The Matthews-Bradshaw House is a historic house at 524 Skyline Drive in North Little Rock, Arkansas. It is a single-story masonry structure, its exterior clad in brick and stone. A conical turreted section with diamond-pane windows projects from one corner, and the gable above the main entrance is finished in half-timbered stucco. Built in 1929 by the Justin Matthews Company as part of its Park Hill development, it is the only example Matthews built of the French Eclectic style. It was designed by Frank Carmean, the Matthews Company architect.

The house was listed on the National Register of Historic Places in 1992.

== See also ==
- National Register of Historic Places listings in Pulaski County, Arkansas
