= Matthews-Godt House =

Historic house in Arkansas, United States

- U.S. National Register of Historic Places
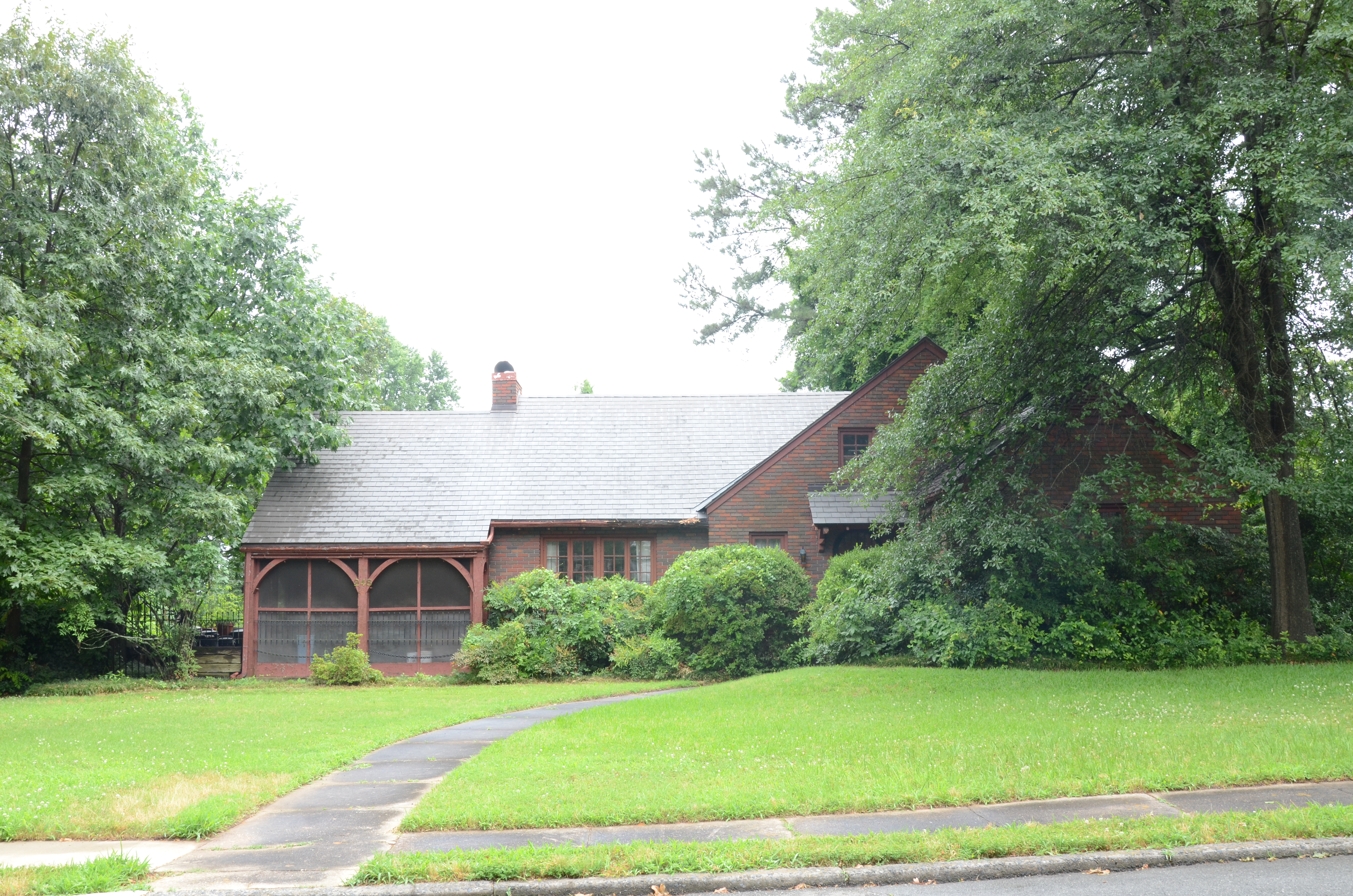

- Location within Arkansas Location within the United States
- Location: 248 Skyline Dr., North Little Rock, Arkansas
- Coordinates: 34°46′55″N 92°15′32″W
- Area: less than one acre
- Built: 1929
- Built by: Justin Matthews
- Architect: Frank Carmean
- Architectural style: Late 19th And 20th Century Revivals, English Revival
- MPS: Pre-Depression Houses and Outbuildings of Edgemont in Park Hill MPS
- NRHP reference No.: 92000565
- Added to NRHP: June 1, 1992

The Matthews-Godt House is a historic house on the 248 Skyline Drive in North Little Rock, Arkansas. Built in 1928, it is an unusual and early example of a split-level house, a style that did not become popular until the 1950s. It is a frame structure finished in brick veneer, in the English Revival style. It was built by developer Justin Matthews as part of his Edgemont development, and was designed by his company architect, Frank Carmean.

The house was listed on the National Register of Historic Places in 1992.

== See also ==
- National Register of Historic Places listings in Pulaski County, Arkansas
