= Matthews-MacFadyen House =

Historic house in Arkansas, United States

- U.S. National Register of Historic Places
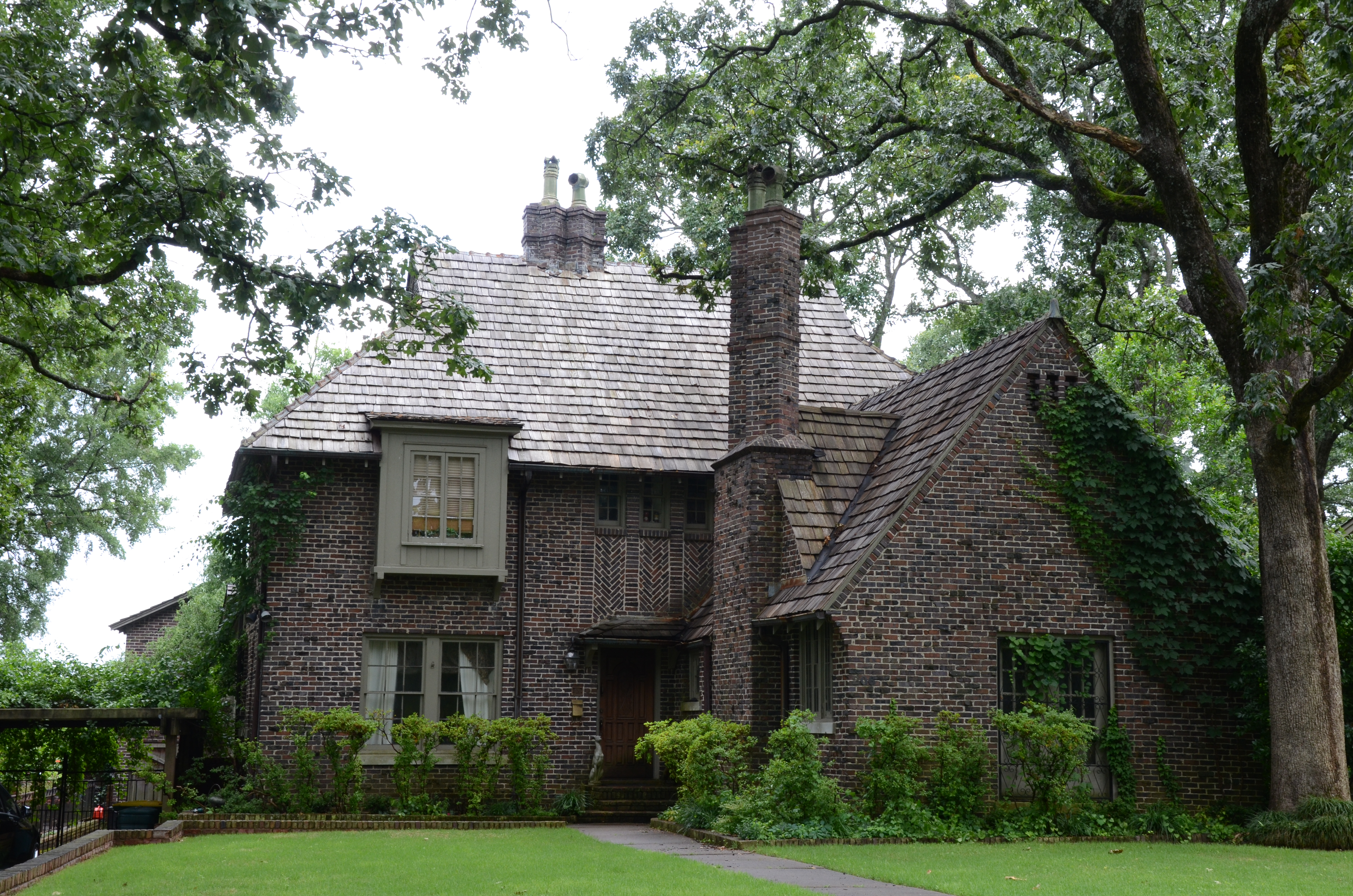

- Location within Arkansas Location within the United States
- Location: 206 Dooley Rd., North Little Rock, Arkansas
- Coordinates: 34°46′52″N 92°15′23″W
- Area: less than one acre
- Built: 1930
- Built by: Justin Matthews
- Architect: Frank Carmean
- Architectural style: Late 19th And 20th Century Revivals, English Revival
- MPS: Pre-Depression Houses and Outbuildings of Edgemont in Park Hill MPS
- NRHP reference No.: 92000569
- Added to NRHP: June 1, 1992

The Matthews-MacFayden House is a historic house at 206 Dooley Road in North Little Rock, Arkansas. It is a two-story brick structure, with gable-on-hip roof, and a projecting single-story gable-roofed section on the right side of the front. Decoratively corbelled brick chimneys rise at the center of the main roof, and a projecting wood-framed oriel window adds a distinctive touch to the front. The house was built in 1930 by developer Justin Matthews as part of his Edgemont development, and was designed by his company architect, Frank Carmean. It is a picturesque example of English Revival architecture.

The house was listed on the National Register of Historic Places in 1992.

== See also ==
- National Register of Historic Places listings in Pulaski County, Arkansas
