= Owings House =

Historic house in Arkansas, USA

- U.S. National Register of Historic Places
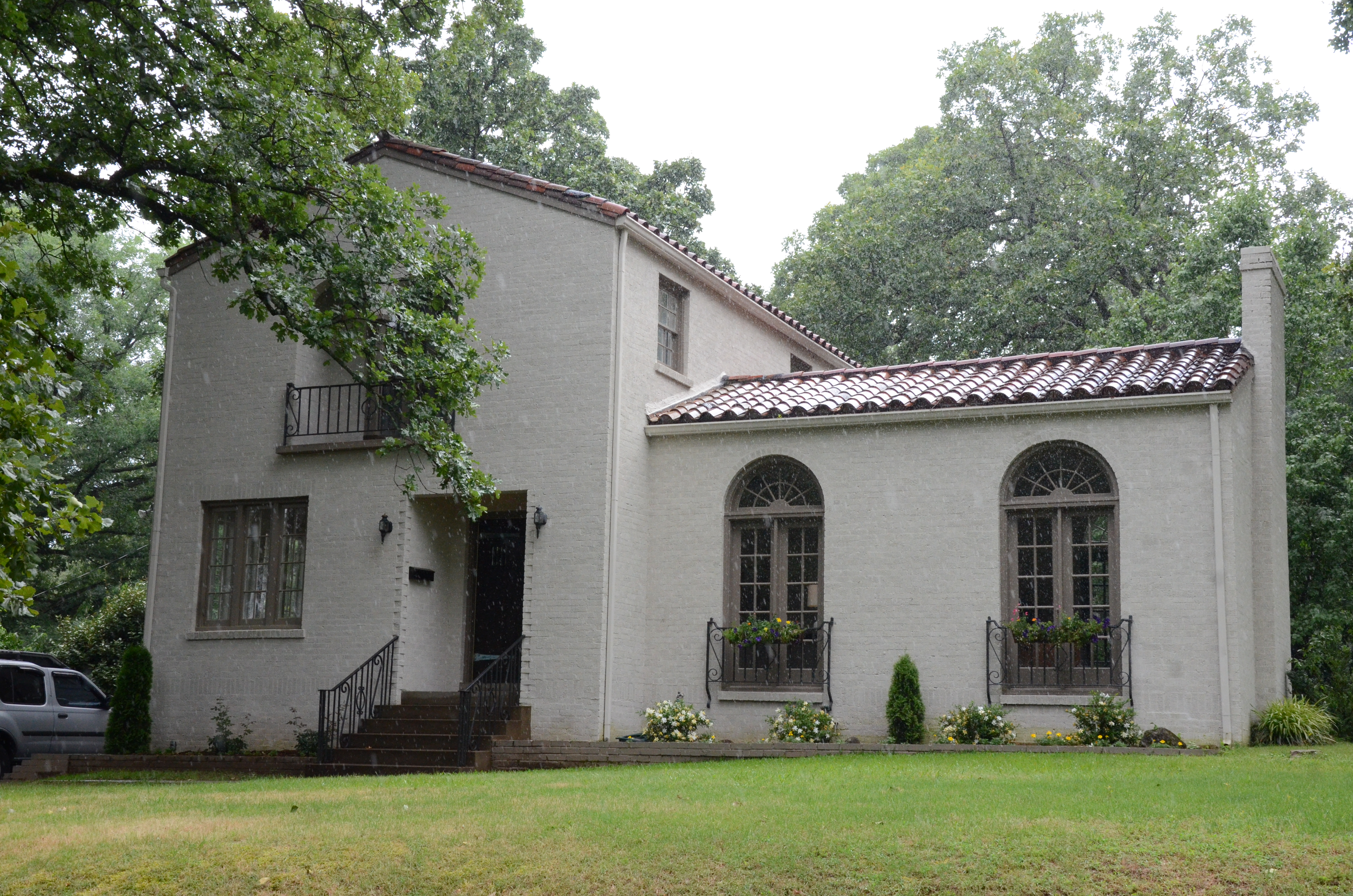

- Location within Arkansas Location within the United States
- Location: 563 Skyline Dr., North Little Rock, Arkansas
- Coordinates: 34°46′50″N 92°15′13″W
- Area: less than one acre
- Built: 1927
- Built by: Justin Matthews
- Architect: Frank Carmean
- Architectural style: Mission Revival/Spanish Colonial Revival
- MPS: Pre-Depression Houses and Outbuildings of Edgemont in Park Hill MPS
- NRHP reference No.: 92000564
- Added to NRHP: June 1, 1992

The Owings House is a historic house at 563 Skyline Drive in North Little Rock, Arkansas. It is a two-story brick building, with classic Spanish Revival features, including a tile roof, arched openings, and iron grillwork. It is unusual in that its brick has not been stuccoed. The house was built in 1927 by Justin Matthews as part of his large Edgemont development. It was the first house to be completed, and was lost by its owners to foreclosure during the Great Depression.

The house was listed on the National Register of Historic Places in 1992.

== See also ==
- National Register of Historic Places listings in Pulaski County, Arkansas
