= Matthews-Bryan House =

Historic house in Arkansas, United States

- U.S. National Register of Historic Places
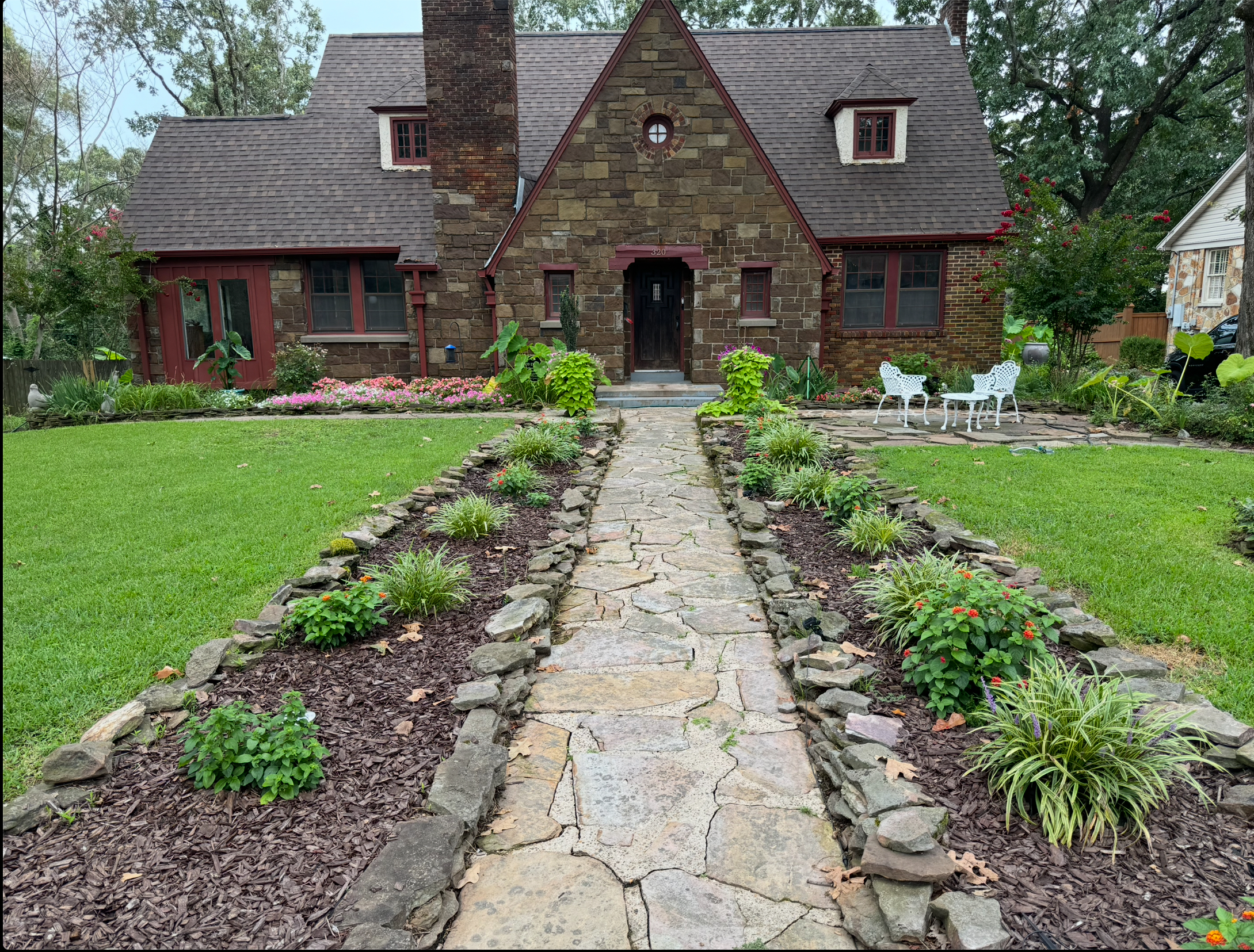

- Location within Arkansas Location within the United States
- Location: 320 Dooley Rd., North Little Rock, Arkansas
- Coordinates: 34°46′51″N 92°15′15″W
- Area: less than one acre
- Built: 1930
- Built by: Justin Matthews
- Architect: Frank Carmean
- Architectural style: Late 19th And 20th Century Revivals, English Revival
- MPS: Pre-Depression Houses and Outbuildings of Edgemont in Park Hill MPS
- NRHP reference No.: 92000560
- Added to NRHP: June 1, 1992

The Matthews-Bryan House is a historic house at 320 Dooley Road, North Little Rock, Arkansas. It is a two-story masonry structure, built in the English Revival style in 1930 by the Justin Matthews Corporation as part of its Park Hill development. It has a steeply pitched gable roof, with cross-gabled entrance, and is faced in stone and brick. It was designed by Matthews Company architect Frank Carmean, and was one of the last houses built by Matthews before the full effects of the Great Depression affected his building style. As with most of Frank Carmean's homes, there are arches throughout and a full sized guest house in the rear.

The house was listed on the National Register of Historic Places in 1992.

== See also ==
- National Register of Historic Places listings in Pulaski County, Arkansas
