= Cherry Hill (amusement park) =

Campground/amusement park in Fruit Heights, Utah

- Interactive map of Cherry Hill
- Location: Fruit Heights, Utah, United States
- Coordinates: 41.013719°N 111.914090°W
- Opened: 1967
- Website: www.cherry-hill.com

Cherry Hill is a small campground/amusement park in Fruit Heights, Utah. The park opened for business on June 4, 1967, originally as just a campground. Later, based on its popularity as a campsite, it created some water attractions for its campers to enjoy in the summer season. It is mainly popular during the summer because of its main focus on water rides. The park also contains many other attractions such as miniature golf, a rock climbing wall, Jungle Gym, and Jungle Themed Maze.

== History ==
Before 1967, the land was 38 acres of a working cherry farm. Some of the trees, of the over 700 there, are still cherry trees. Grant S. Lloyd, the farmer born and raised there, received the property from his father, who split the property in two between his sons. Grant got the southern portion, which was 2 acres larger than the northern portion, when he lost a coin toss to his brother, who elected to take the northern half. Grant sold the sand from the extra 2 acres to the Utah Highway Department for .02 cents a yard so they could widen Highway 89 nearby. He sold it with no regrets, as the sand from the 2 acres restricted the growth of his fruit trees. He realized he could make a greater profit on his land that would give him much more money than his farm. Now that he was near a busy interstate, he partnered with a Chevron gas station that was built close by and teamed up with a restaurant to be built on his property for lease. As these things occurred, he and his wife planned on constructing the campground and producing even more profit.

On June 4, 1967, the campground opened. Named "Crossroads Camping", it helped travelers with its food, cheap gas, and hospitality.

On June 10, 1978, Grant and Marry Lou opened up an 18-hole mini golf course, along with a game room and snack bar to accompany it. In 1980, the Lloyds built a two-flume waterslide measuring 375 feet long. In 1984 came a 6-cage batting room (Which was removed in 2014 to make room for a Jungle Maze), and in 1985 came the "Cardiac Canyon River Run," which was a tube water slide meant to simulate a turbulent river run.

By this time, Grant had passed the park on to his two sons, Bruce and Keith, and in 1994 added Pirates Cove, a children's splash pad with a pirate theme featuring a 40-foot-long mock pirate ship. In 2004, Bruce and Keith added a lazy river and named it Grant's Gulch after their father. This project came with 140 parking stalls, a new changing room, and a new snack bar. Since this time, Bruce has passed day-to-day operations of the park onto Mitch and Jared Lloyd, who run the park to this day

In March 2024, the water from the lazy river was drained into the city's sewer system, overwhelming the sewer lines and overflowing with sewer water into the basements of a dozen houses in the vicinity. The park had drained its water the same way for the past 20 years, and no similar incident was previously recorded. Investigations on the matter lasted months because the Cherry Hill drain alone could not be held responsible for the whole water system overflow.

== Rides ==
Cherry Hill Water Park has the following rides:

- Swimming pool: Pirates Cove Pool
- Lazy river: Grant's Gulch Lazy River
- Rafting: Cardiac Canyon River Run
- Water slide: Double Dragons, Little Dippers
- Children's water park: Pirates Cove
