= Cherry-Luter Estate =

Historic house in Arkansas, United States

- U.S. National Register of Historic Places
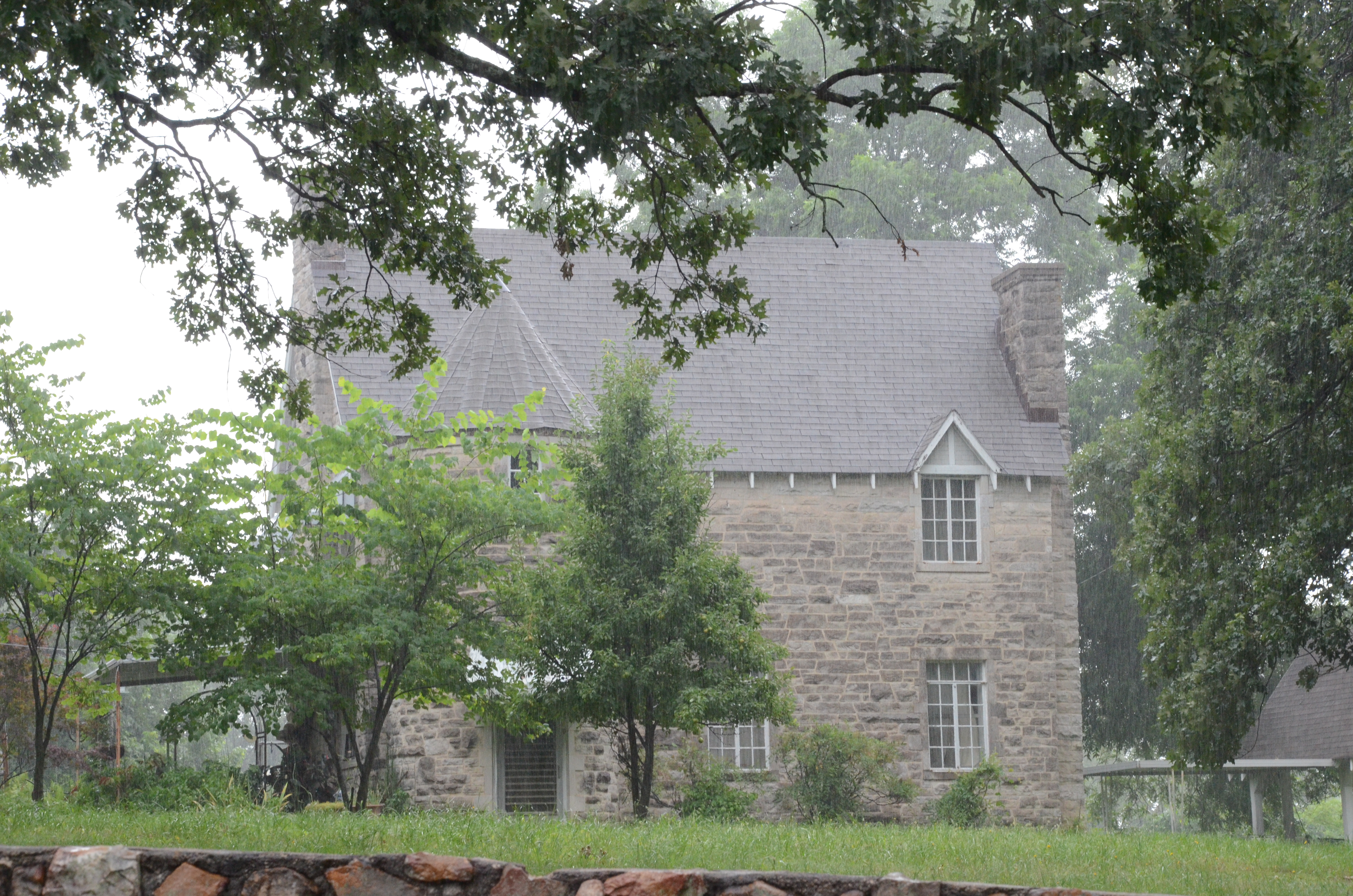

- Location within Arkansas Location within the United States
- Location: 521 W. Scenic Dr., North Little Rock, Arkansas
- Coordinates: 34°47′3″N 92°17′23″W
- Area: 4.7 acres (1.9 ha)
- Built: 1923
- Architectural style: Late 19th and 20th Century Revivals, French Renaissance
- NRHP reference No.: 92001155
- Added to NRHP: September 4, 1992

The Cherry-Luter Estate is a historic country estate, also known as The Castle, at 521 West Scenic Drive in North Little Rock, Arkansas. The main house is a two-story French Renaissance limestone structure with a gabled roof and round tower at its southwest corner. A carriage house of similar construction stands nearby, and there is a pavilion with a half-timbered roof with exposed beams. A stone wall lines the road at the edge of the property, which is just under 5 acres (2.0 ha) in size. The estate was largely developed by 1923 by John J. Cherry, and is one of the city's architectural landmarks.

The property was listed on the National Register of Historic Places in 1992.

The estate was purchased by Rev. Steven and Theresa Tiner in February, 2016.

== See also ==
- Cherry House (North Little Rock, Arkansas), also NRHP-listed
- National Register of Historic Places listings in Pulaski County, Arkansas
