= Lakeshore Drive Bridge =

Bridge in Arkansas, US

- U.S. National Register of Historic Places
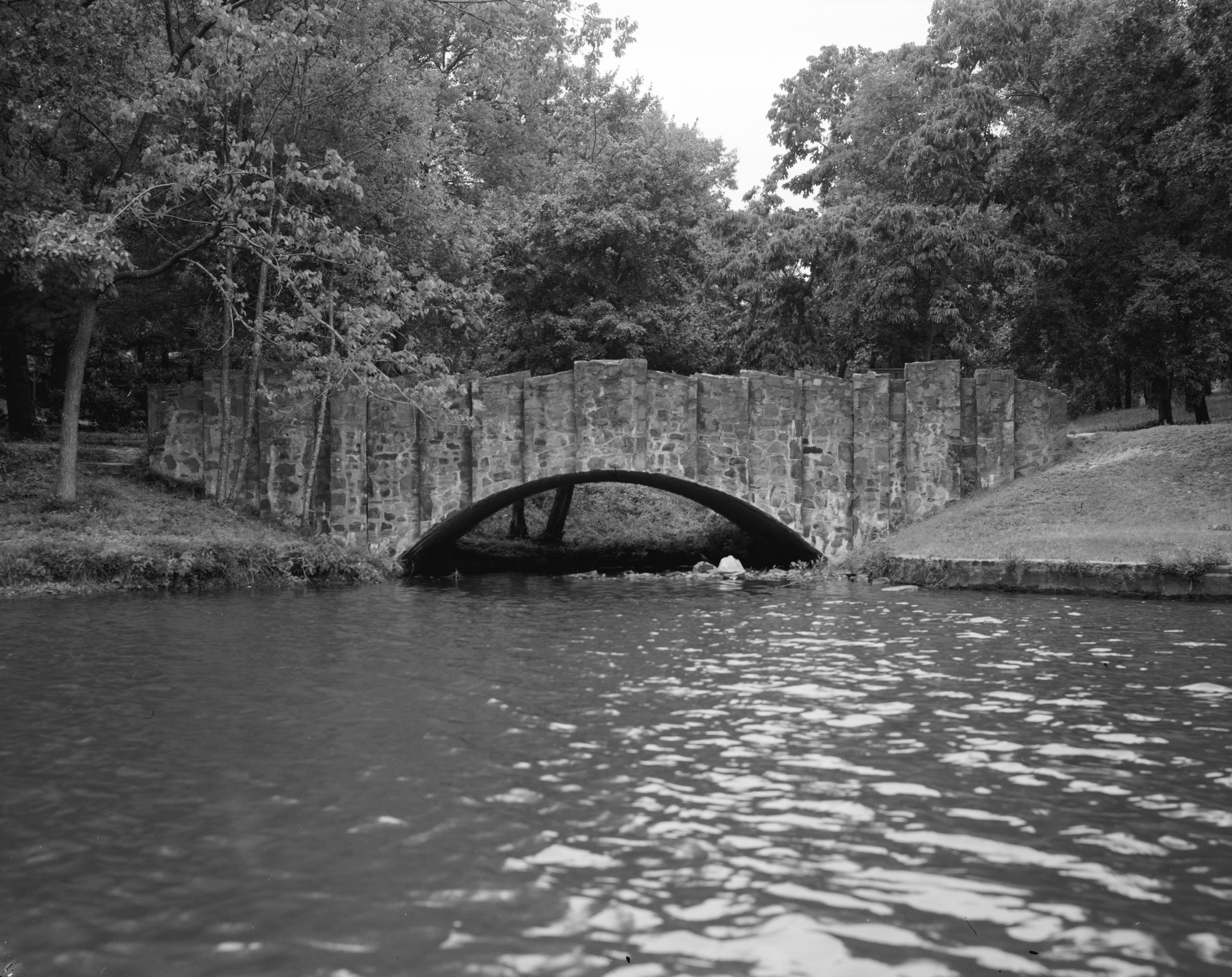
- HAER photo, 1988

- Location within Arkansas Location within the United States
- Location: Lakeshore Drive at Lake No. 3, North Little Rock, Arkansas
- Coordinates: 34°47′41″N 92°15′6″W
- Area: less than one acre
- Architect: Frank Carmean
- Architectural style: Closed spandrel, deck arch
- MPS: Historic Bridges of Arkansas MPS
- NRHP reference No.: 90000532
- Added to NRHP: April 9, 1990

The Lakeshore Drive Bridge carries a closed-off portion of Lakeshore Drive across a tributary stream on the west side of Lake Number 3 in North Little Rock, Arkansas. It is a stone arch bridge with closed spandrels and a total structure length of 53 feet (16 m). The bridge consists of a single elliptical curved arch, which spans 20 feet (6.1 m) and is 5 feet (1.5 m) high. Rustic square stone columns rise from the spandrels, creating uneven parapets on the sides of the structure. The bridge was built in the late 1930s along with Edgemere Street Bridge as part of developer Justin Matthews' construction of the Lakewood area. It is one of a small number of documented masonry arch bridges in the state.

The bridge was listed on the National Register of Historic Places in 1990.

== See also ==
- List of bridges documented by the Historic American Engineering Record in Arkansas
- List of bridges on the National Register of Historic Places in Arkansas
- National Register of Historic Places listings in Pulaski County, Arkansas
