= Joseph E. England Jr. House =

Historic house in Arkansas, United States

- U.S. National Register of Historic Places
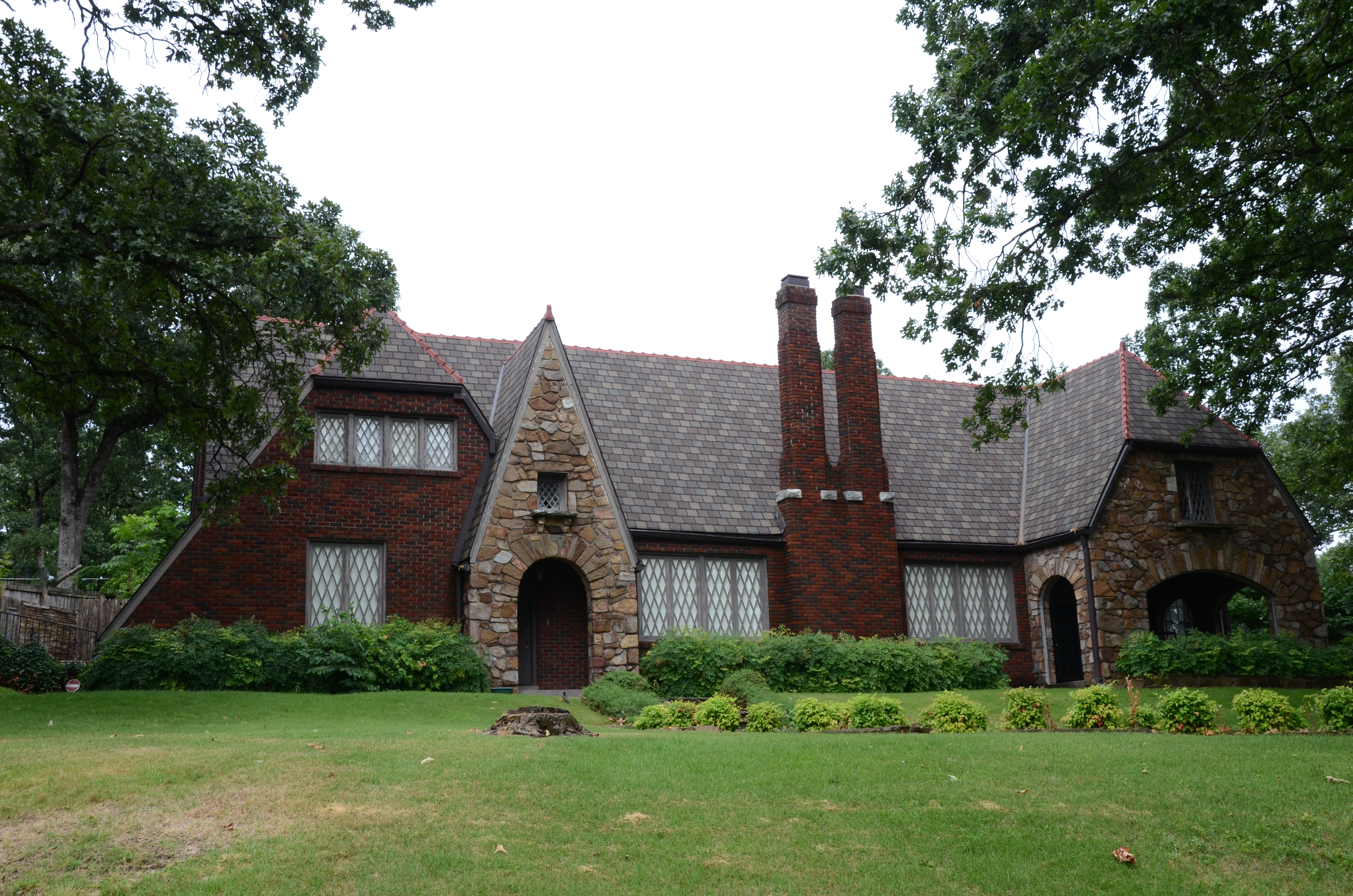

- Location within Arkansas Location within the United States
- Location: 313 Skyline Dr., North Little Rock, Arkansas
- Coordinates: 34°46′53″N 92°15′29″W
- Area: less than one acre
- Built: 1928
- Built by: Justin Matthews Co.
- Architect: Frank Carmean
- Architectural style: Late 19th And 20th Century Revivals, English Revival
- MPS: Pre-Depression Houses and Outbuildings of Edgemont in Park Hill MPS
- NRHP reference No.: 92000566
- Added to NRHP: June 1, 1992

The Joseph E. England Jr. House is a historic house at 313 Skyline Drive in North Little Rock, Arkansas. It is a 1 1/2-story brick and stone structure, set on a wedge-shaped lot with expansive views of the Arkansas River. Built in 1928, it is a fine example of Tudor Revival architecture, and one of the Edgemont neighborhood's most elaborate pre-Depression houses. It was built for a prominent local banker and businessman who was an associate of Edgemont's developer, Justin Matthews.

The house was listed on the National Register of Historic Places in 1992.

== See also ==
- National Register of Historic Places listings in Pulaski County, Arkansas
