= Max Friedrich Meyer =

German professor (1873–1967)

- Born: June 14, 1873; Danzig, Germany
- Died: March 14, 1967 (aged 93)
- Occupations: Psychologist; professor
- Known for: Behaviourism and music theory

Max Friedrich Meyer (June 14, 1873 – March 14, 1967) was the first psychology professor who worked on psychoacoustics and taught at the University of Missouri. He was the founder of the theory of cochlear function, and was also an advocate for behaviourism as he argued in his book "The Psychology of the Other". During his time at the University of Missouri, he opened an experimental lab for Psychology and taught a variety of courses. His lab focused on behavioural zeitgeist and the studies of nervous system and behaviour. Meyer eventually moved to Miami and lived there from 1932 until the late 1950s. Afterwards, he moved to Virginia to stay with his daughter until his death in 1967.

== Early life ==
Max Friedrich Meyer was born in Germany in the city of Danzig on June 14, 1873. He was the son of a goldsmith and went to school in Germany. In 1892, he went to the University of Berlin where he enrolled in theology, but he studied other subjects. He became a professor of experimental psychology and focused on the psychology of music. He married one of his students, Stella Sexton, on February 13, 1904, and had five children, Sophie, Harold, Catherine, Dorothy and Otto. Max Meyer divorced her in 1936.

After his first year he switched to philosophy and met Hermann Ebbinghaus, and through that he met his mentor, Carl Stumpf. Stumpf and Meyer were interested in similar concepts relating to the psychology of music. At the University of Berlin, he worked under Carl Stumpf on psycho-acoustics for a couple of years and completed his PhD where he came up with his new theory of audition which questioned the current theories at the time. Meyer became a research associate under Stumpf after he finished his PhD in 1896. Due to a difference of opinion between Stumpf and Meyer, Meyer moved to the University of London where he worked under James Sully, and then moved to America and worked at Clark University, where he assisted G. Stanley Hall. Meyer was developing his work on cochlear function in hearing during this time. He was then finally appointed as a faculty member in 1900 at the University of Missouri.

== Career ==
Meyer was the first-ever psychology professor hired by the University of Missouri. He opened the laboratory in experimental psychology and taught an extensive range of psychology courses during his professorship which included: Introduction to Psychology, Perception and Behaviour, Differential Psychology, General Aesthetics, Theory of Music, Advanced Psychology, Comparative Psychology, Social Psychology, Industrial Psychology and Abnormal Psychology. As of 2019, Meyer has 209 publications in three languages circulating in 2,439 library holdings around the world. His books are still in print and can be obtained through Amazon.

=== Behaviourism ===
Meyer was an early advocate of behaviourism in America. In his book, The Psychology of the Other, he argues that psychology should focus on behaviour instead of the mind. Meyer did not deny the existence of consciousness like the other behaviourists at that time, he was simply against the utilization of introspection as a scientific tool. His reasoning behind this was that he felt that it was not necessary to study the mind to understand human behaviour. He thought that one just needed to study the nervous law which oversees human behaviour to understand behaviour. Later in life Meyer taught courses about aesthetics as they had captured his attention during his undergraduate days. He went on to publish two journal articles about the topic. His work studies in the nervous system and behaviour came to the attention of John B. Watson, the father of behaviourism. Meyer published important monographs, textbooks and journal articles in both music and psychology.

=== Language ===
Meyer also contributed to the field of language. He contends that infants learn speech sounds through impersonation. At first, audial speech sounds are a reflex in the young. They hear a sound and react by shaping a comparable sound. After some time, this impersonation stops. Acquiring speech sounds is dependent on whether or not making a similar sound is valuable to an individual or not. This loss of reflex is the reason why people cannot learn new dialects easily. In his book, fitting into the silent world, he talks about this stenograph system which he has created based on phonetics. He argued that it can be effective in deaf people for oral education. To back up his argument, he presented longitudinal studies using his system in deaf people.

=== Music theory ===
Meyer started developing his work during the year 1894 at the University of Berlin when he became a pupil to Carl Stumpf. During his time as a pupil, he was described as having a technical ingenuity that assisted Meyer in developing instruments to research music theory. During his years studying under Stumpf, he developed his theory of cochlear function. His main source of data was "introspective observations of difference tones, of the relative intensities of tones in a compound tone, and of the differences in relative intensity of tones sounded simultaneously and separately". From this theory, he developed a hypothesis about "the anatomical and physiological properties of the ear" where the assumption was that "the inner ear is a hydraulic system, that the effective cochlear oscillations occur in the basilar membrane, that this membrane is inelastic, and that its motions passively follow the motions of the stapes". This received little attention until the year 1966.

After having a falling out with Stumpf, he migrated to London and spent time in the psychological lab of James Sully at the University of London for 6 months. Here he worked on developing an apparatus where a deaf person could even compose, as well as worked on a theory of harmony.

Meyer then travelled to America and spend time at Clark University and later the University of Missouri. Here he published a series of articles, one of them about an experiment he conducted back in Berlin which favoured the view that memory of absolute pitch can be improved with practice. This time was also very important as he published his first edition of his theory of music. In this first edition, he critiqued his predecessor Stumpf, as well as Hermann von Helmholtz, saying how he felt that their focus of the diatonic scale prevented them from developing a scientific, empirical theory of music. He also constructed a scale "represented by the infinite series of all composites of the powers of 2, 3, 5, and 7", which he believed was sufficient to study music theory. He extended his theory of music during his first year at Missouri, adding that the hearing of simultaneous tones contain two important effects: "the melodic relationship also heard in successive tones, and consonance".

In 1903, Meyer conducted a study related to "the aesthetic effects of final tones, the intonation of musical intervals, and quartertone music". The findings of the study found that quartertone music in European music became more pleasant with increased familiarity (as long as it followed the "general laws of European music"). Since some quartertones were also present in Oriental music, he used these findings to support the theory that the psychological laws of music are the same all over the world, even though a good amount of this study relied on his own interpretation of certain results.

Some of his final works included trying to develop tests that measured a variety of factors as well as trying to find a scientific music staff that would not require musical signs (ex. flats), but these results were never published. He also developed the musical arithmetic in 1929, which discusses the neurological implications of music perception, but this lacked reference to previous literature.

== Death and legacy ==
From 1932 till the late 1950s, Meyer lived in Miami where he continued his research and had a divorce in 1936. He later moved to Virginia and lived with his daughter until his death in 1967. The laboratory started by Meyer during 1930 would later become the Department of Psychology at the University of Missouri. There is a room at the university that is dedicated to him. His house is still preserved.
