= Matthews House (North Little Rock, Arkansas) =

Historic house in Arkansas, United States

- U.S. National Register of Historic Places
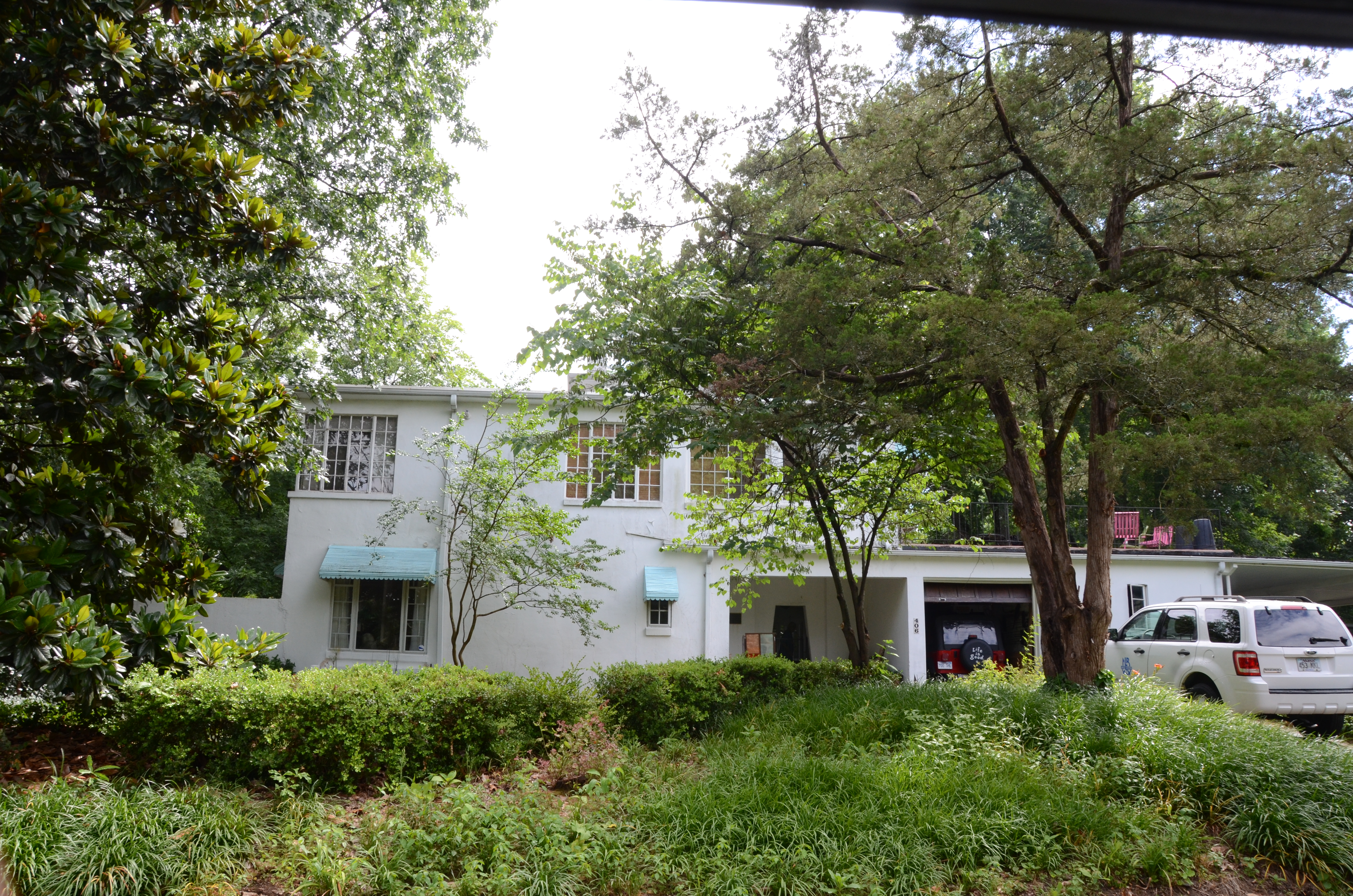

- Location within Arkansas Location within the United States
- Location: 406 Goshen, North Little Rock, Arkansas
- Coordinates: 34°45′54″N 92°15′2″W
- Area: less than one acre
- Built: 1928
- Built by: Justin Matthews
- Architect: Frank Carmean
- Architectural style: Art Deco, Modernistic
- NRHP reference No.: 83001165
- Added to NRHP: September 29, 1983

The Matthews House is a historic house at 406 Goshen Street in North Little Rock, Arkansas. Built in 1928, it is an unusually modern interpretation of Georgian Revival architecture, designed by Frank Carmean and built by Justin Matthews as a showcase home for his Park Hill development. It has a stuccoed exterior, and its shape is that of squares intersecting at a circular stairwell. Its interior exhibits elements of Art Deco styling. The house was widely advertised by Matthews after its completion, and more than 20,000 people are estimated to have toured it.

The house was listed on the National Register of Historic Places in 1983.

== See also ==
- National Register of Historic Places listings in Pulaski County, Arkansas
