= Cherry Hill (author) =

American author

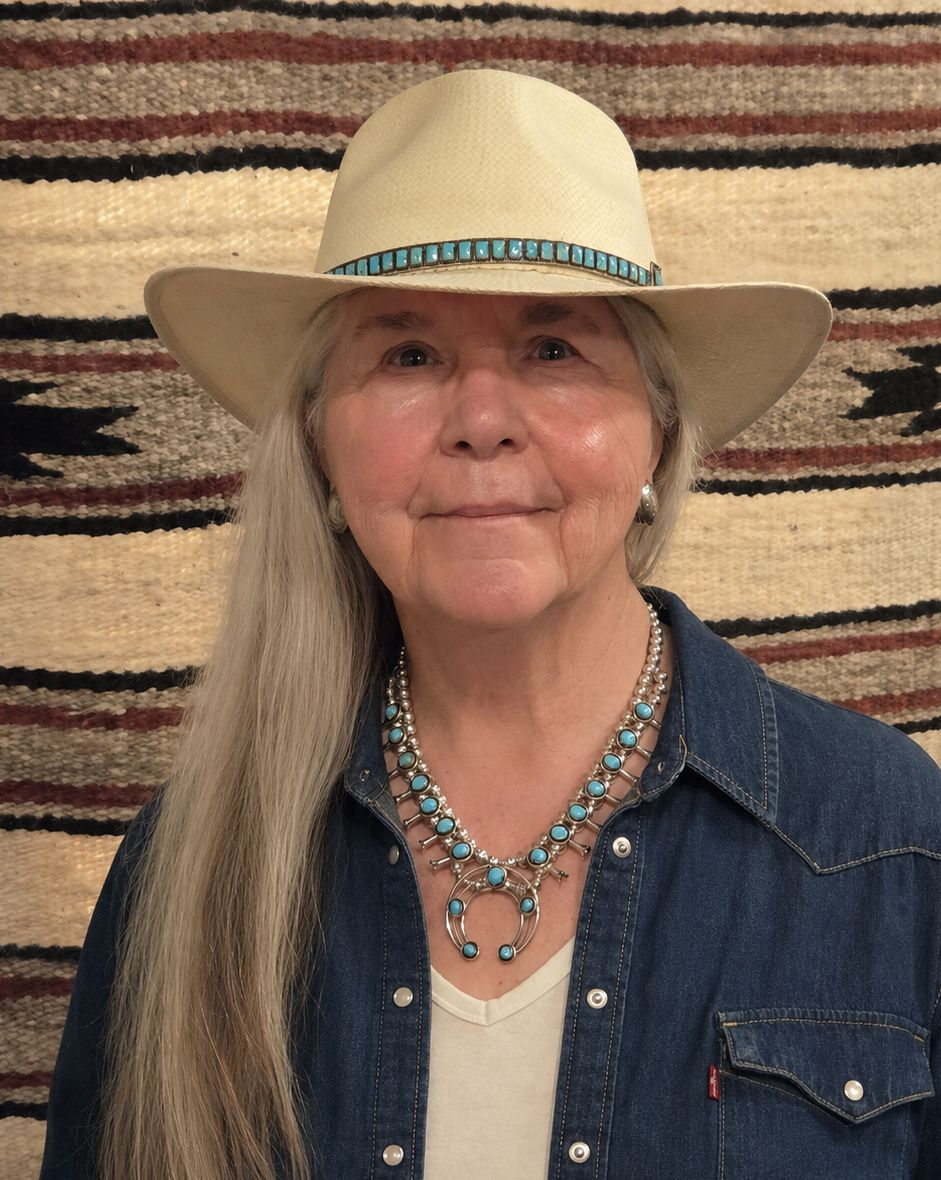
- Hill in 2026
- Born: 1947 (age 78–79); Michigan
- Education: Iowa State University (B.S. animal science)
- Occupations: Author, educator, horse trainer
- Spouse: Richard Klimesh
- Writing career
- Genre: Non-fiction
- Subjects: Horsemanship, horse care, horse training, stable management
- Website: www.horsekeeping.com

Cherry Hill (born 1947) is an American equestrian author, educator, horse trainer, and judge. She has written more than 30 books on horse care, training, riding, and stable management, as well as hundreds of articles for equestrian publications.

== Early life and education ==
Hill was born in Michigan. She studied animal science at Michigan State University before continuing her studies at Iowa State University, where she earned a Bachelor of Science degree in animal science. While attending Iowa State, Hill met Richard Klimesh, whom she later married.

== Teaching and judging career ==
Before becoming a full-time writer, Hill worked as a horse trainer. She taught equine science at colleges in the United States and Canada for ten years. She was a horse husbandry instructor at Olds College in Alberta, Canada, and later taught horse care and stable management at Kishwaukee College in Illinois.

Hill subsequently developed the equestrian classes at Highland Community College in Illinois, where students could earn a two-year degree in horse science. At Colorado State University, she taught horse behavior and training, horse production, and riding instructor training courses before leaving academia in 1985 to write full time.

Hill also worked as a horse-show judge for 25 years. Contemporary newspaper coverage described her as a judge of Appaloosa, 4-H, and open horse shows, and she later judged for several national breed organizations. In 2005, she served as a judge for the Road to the Horse colt-starting challenge in Murfreesboro, Tennessee.

== Writing ==
Hill began writing full time in 1985. According to a 2000 profile in Western Horseman, her transition to writing grew out of her work as an equine educator: while teaching, she developed instructional materials for her students, who encouraged her to turn the material into a book. Her first book, The Formative Years, was published in 1988. By 2000, the Rocky Mountain News described Hill as a prolific author of horse-care books and reported that she had written more than 800 articles.

Hill's books address horse behavior, training, riding, horse care, stable management, and the design and management of equine facilities. Her work frequently emphasizes understanding horse behavior as a basis for training and management.

Hill's work on equine behavior has been cited by animal behaviorist Temple Grandin, who discusses Hill's classification of horse behavior problems in Animals Make Us Human.

== Reception of works ==
Her 1990 book Horsekeeping on a Small Acreage was reviewed by several equestrian magazines. Western Horseman described it as easy to read and useful to horse owners, while The Quarter Horse Journal called the book useful for both new and experienced horse owners. Library Journal described the book as a detailed and practical treatment of horse ownership and recommended it for public and academic libraries with equine collections.

Cherry Hill's Horse Care for Kids (2002) also received reviews outside the equestrian press. Booklist called it a well-designed and informative guide for young people and praised its illustrations and coverage of horse care and behavior. Publishers Weekly described the book as a comprehensive guide to choosing, handling, and caring for a horse.

Cherry Hill's Horsekeeping Almanac (2007) was reviewed in the equestrian press. Western Horseman praised the book's organization and practical approach to year-round horse care, while Horse & Rider described it as a comprehensive month-by-month guide to horsekeeping.

== Awards and honors ==
- 2002 – ASPCA Henry Bergh Children's Book Honor, Non-Fiction Companion Animals, for Cherry Hill's Horse Care Book for Kids.

== Selected bibliography ==
- How to Think Like a Horse Calendar 2025 (2025)
- How to Think Like a Horse Calendar 2024 (2024)
- 101 Ground Training Exercises (2012)
- What Every Horse Should Know (2011)
- Horse Hoof Care (2009)
- Cherry Hill's Horsekeeping Almanac (2007)
- Your Horse Barn (2007)
- How to Think Like a Horse (2006)
- Equipping Your Horse Farm (2006)
- 101 Horsekeeping Tips (2005)
- The Horse – El Caballo (2005)
- Horse Housing (with Richard Klimesh) (2002)
- Riding Western (2002)
- Cherry Hill's Horse Care for Kids (2002)
- Trailering Your Horse (2000)
- Stablekeeping (2000)
- 101 Horsemanship and Equitation Patterns (1999)
- 101 Longeing and Long Lining Exercises (1999)
- Longeing and Long Lining the English and Western Horse (1999)
- Beginning English Exercises (1998)
- Intermediate English Exercises (1998)
- Advanced English Exercises (1998)
- Beginning Western Exercises (1998)
- Intermediate Western Exercises (1998)
- Advanced Western Exercises (1998)
- Horse Health Care (1997)
- Horse Handling and Grooming (1997)
- Your Pony, Your Horse (1995)
- Horse for Sale (1995)
- 101 Arena Exercises (1995)
- Practical Guide to Lameness (with Ted Stashak) (1995)
- Maximum Hoof Power (1994)
- Making, Not Breaking (1992)
- Becoming an Effective Rider (1991)
- Tack Care and Cleaning (1991)
- Buying and Selling a Horse (1991)
- Horsekeeping on a Small Acreage (1990)
- From the Center of the Ring (1988)
- The Formative Years (1988)
