= Cherry House (North Little Rock, Arkansas) =

Historic house in Arkansas, United States

- U.S. National Register of Historic Places
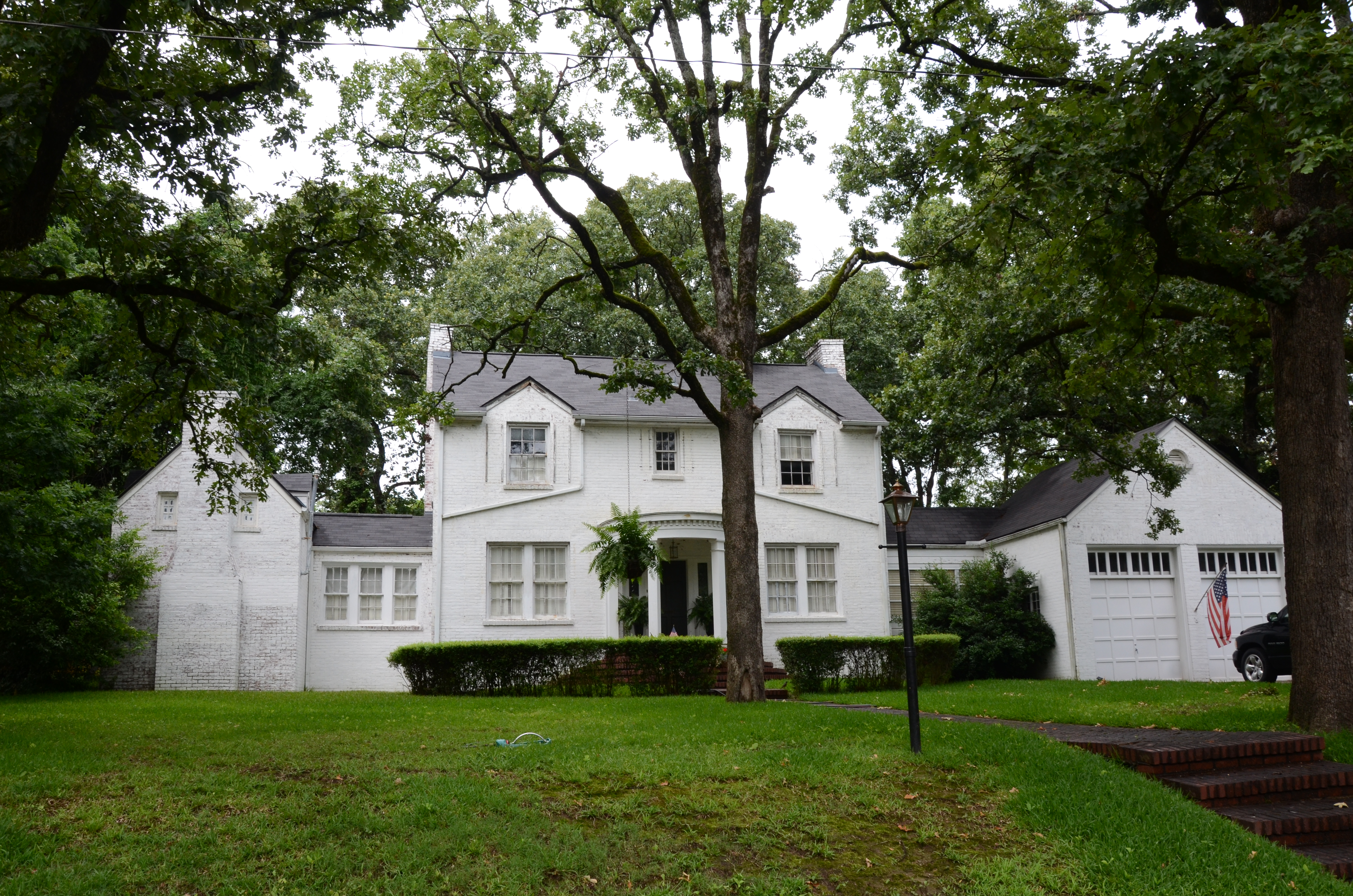

- Location within Arkansas Location within the United States
- Location: 217 Dooley Rd., North Little Rock, Arkansas
- Coordinates: 34°46′54″N 92°15′23″W
- Area: less than one acre
- Built: 1930
- Built by: Justin Matthews Co.
- Architect: Frank Carmean
- Architectural style: Colonial Revival, Georgian Revival
- MPS: Pre-Depression Houses and Outbuildings of Edgemont in Park Hill MPS
- NRHP reference No.: 92000562
- Added to NRHP: June 1, 1992

The Cherry House is a historic house at 217 Dooley Road in North Little Rock, Arkansas. It is a 2 1/2-story wood-frame structure, finished with a painted brick veneer. The main block has single-story flanking wings, which join it to a two-story wing on the left and a garage on the right. The main entrance is sheltered by a Georgian Revival-style semicircular portico. Built in 1930, it has been asserted to be the finest example of Colonial Revival architecture in the city's Edgemont neighborhood.

The house was listed on the National Register of Historic Places in 1992.

== See also ==
- Cherry-Luter Estate, North Little Rock, Arkansas, also NRHP-listed
- National Register of Historic Places listings in Pulaski County, Arkansas
