= Justin Matthews =

American builder and real estate developer

- Born: 1876 near Monticello, Arkansas
- Died: 1955 (aged 78–79); North Little Rock, Arkansas
- Resting place: Mount Holly Cemetery, Little Rock
- Occupations: Builder, real estate developer
- Known for: National Register of Historic Places properties
- Spouse(s): Mary Agnes Somers Matthews (d. November 22, 1933); Robin Matthews

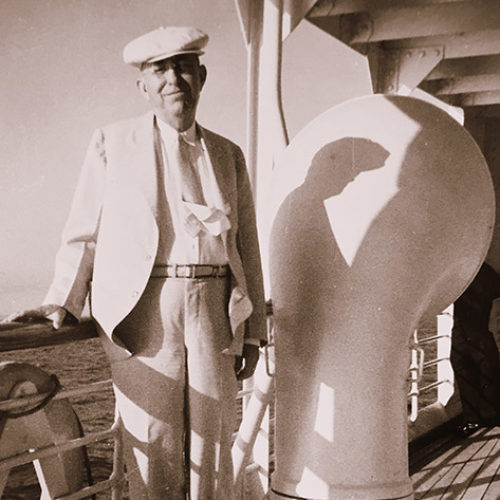
Justin Matthews Sr. on the cruise ship SS Cartago sailing from New Orleans to Costa Rica; February, 1926.

Justin Matthews (1876–1955) was an Arkansas road and bridge builder and real estate developer. He helped to design and expand many areas in central Arkansas.

== Background ==
Matthews was born in 1876 near Monticello, Arkansas. He was formally trained as a pharmacist but prospered in cottonseed oil. In 1911, he moved to Little Rock, Arkansas, where he built roads and bridges and invested in and developed real estate on the north side of the Arkansas River.

== Development projects ==
Matthews laid the foundation for the development of North Little Rock by paving 152 blocks of muddy land on the north shore of the Arkansas River across from Little Rock. In 1914, he established an improvement district to install stormwater and sanitary sewer lines in the area, which is known as the Argenta neighborhood of North Little Rock. He built houses, office buildings, and retail shops there throughout the 1910s.

In the 1920s and 1930s, Matthews developed the Park Hill and Lakewood neighborhoods in North Little Rock, divided by the Sylvian Hills Highway (since renamed as John F. Kennedy Boulevard). The Edgemont area of Park Hill contains grand homes, some of which are listed on the National Register of Historic Places, while the Crestwood area contains more modest houses. Lakewood is known for the multiple lakes that Matthews built, as well as the T.R. Pugh Memorial Park, also known as the Old Mill. In both neighborhoods, Matthews sold the completed homes, as well as empty lots, and offered his company's services to build similarly sized and valued houses on them.

To connect Argenta to his new developments to the north, Matthews led the construction of the Main Street viaduct in 1926. He also served as chairman of the improvement district responsible for construction of the Broadway Bridge, which connected North Little Rock to Little Rock. Matthews was appointed to the Arkansas Highway Commission in 1927.

He donated several parcels to the city of North Little Rock to be developed into small city parks.

The Arkansas Gazette's 1955 obituary said the businessman was credited for having "transformed a wilderness into a great community with homes, stores, schools, churches and service establishments", and noted "Justin Matthews built or had part in the building of more structures than any other man who ever lived and labored in Arkansas."

== Personal ==
Matthews was married twice. His first wife, Mary Agnes Somers Matthews, died November 22, 1933. The couple are buried side by side on the front row of Mount Holly Cemetery in downtown Little Rock. The graves are marked by a pair of distinctively carved religious figures - Joseph holding the Christ child, and the Virgin Mary. Both monuments were fashioned from white marble. He was survived by his second wife, Robin.

Non-licensed architect Frank Carmean, a well respected talent, was employed by the Justin Matthews Company. He copied famed structures in California and created new designs for Matthews' Arkansas clients.

== Works ==
- The T.R. Pugh Mill, also known as the Old Mill, in the Lakewood area of North Little Rock, Arkansas.
- The Wavey Roof House, mistakenly referenced as Matthews-Phebus House, 564 Skyline Dr. North Little Rock (Matthews, Justin, Co.), not NRHP-listed
- Cherry House, 217 Dooley Rd. North Little Rock (Matthews, Justin, Co.), NRHP-listed
- Joseph E. England Jr. House, 313 Skyline Dr. North Little Rock (Matthews, Justin, Co.), NRHP-listed
- Jeffries House, 415 Skyline Dr. North Little Rock (Matthews, Justin, Co.), NRHP-listed
- Matthews House, 406 Goshen North Little Rock (Matthews, Justin), NRHP-listed
- Matthews-Bradshaw House, 524 Skyline Dr. North Little Rock (Matthews, Justin, Co.), NRHP-listed
- Matthews-Bryan House, 320 Dooley Rd. North Little Rock (Matthews, Justin, Co.), NRHP-listed
- Matthews-Dillon House, 701 Skyline Dr. North Little Rock (Matthews, Justin, Co.), NRHP-listed
- Matthews-Godt House, 248 Skyline Dr. North Little Rock (Matthews, Justin, Co.), NRHP-listed
- Matthews-MacFadyen House, 206 Dooley Rd. North Little Rock (Matthews, Justin, Co.), NRHP-listed
- Owings House, 563 Skyline Dr. North Little Rock (Matthews, Justin, Co.), NRHP-listed
- Roundtop Filling Station, Intersection of Roundtop and Trammel Roads Sherwood, AR (Matthews, Justin, Co.) NRHP-listed
- Young House, 436 Skyline Dr. North Little Rock (Matthews, Justin, Co.), NRHP-listed
- Multiple other houses located on Skyline Drive and in the Crestwood neighborhood of Park Hill in North Little Rock, Arkansas, not NRHP-listed
- Two uniquely designed gasoline stations in Little Rock, since demolished
