= Seed Warehouse No. 5 =

- U.S. National Register of Historic Places
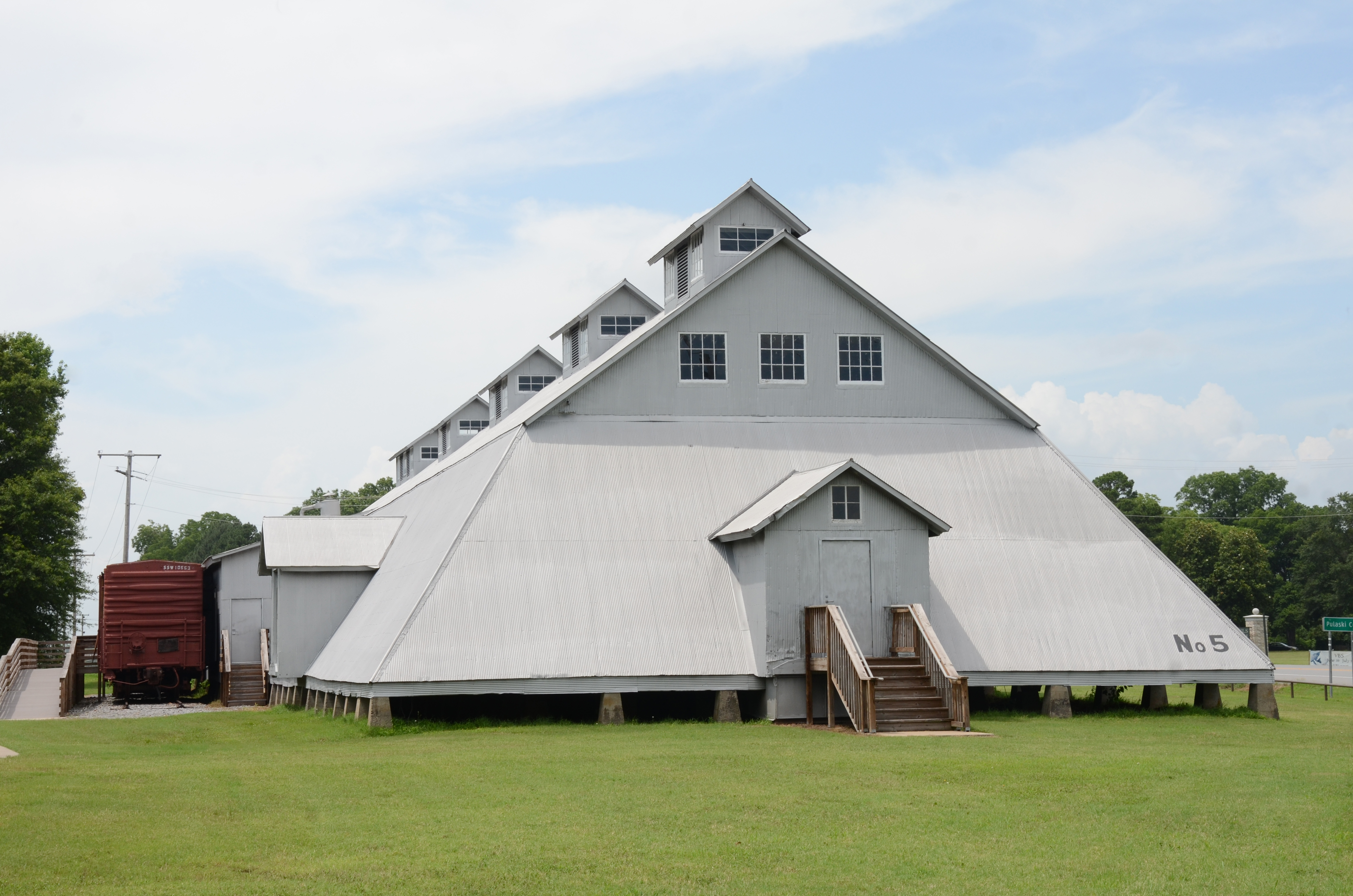

- Location within Arkansas Location within the United States
- Location: SW corner of US 165 and AR 161, Scott, Arkansas
- Coordinates: 34°41′55″N 92°5′49″W
- Area: less than one acre
- Built: 1948
- Built by: Dortch, Robert L.
- Architectural style: Plain Traditional
- MPS: Cotton and Rice Farm History and Architecture in the Arkansas Delta MPS
- NRHP reference No.: 09001259
- Added to NRHP: January 21, 2010

The Seed Warehouse No. 5 is a historic seed storage facility, now located on the grounds of the Plantation Agriculture Museum, a state park in Scott, Arkansas. It is a long rectangular structure, with walls that slope inward as they rise to a gable roof. The roof is topped by a series of gabled cupolas, each with windows and louvered openings. The main entrance is at one end, in a projecting gabled section. All of the exterior walls are corrugated metal. Built in 1948 by a prominent local cotton farmer, it is a well-preserved example of a modern mid-20th century cotton seed storage facility. It was acquired by the state in 1985 for the museum, underwent restoration in 2008, and now houses museum exhibits.

The building was listed on the National Register of Historic Places in 2010.

== See also ==
- National Register of Historic Places listings in Pulaski County, Arkansas
