= Galloway, Arkansas =

Unincorporated community in Arkansas

Coordinates: 34°46′47″N 92°07′44″W

Galloway is an unincorporated community located within the city limits of North Little Rock, Arkansas in Pulaski County, Arkansas. It's located at the intersection of U.S. Highway 70 and Arkansas Highway 391. The community is served by I-40 interchange 161. The community is located along the north shore of Hills Lake, a serpentine oxbow formed by a prior channel of the Arkansas River.

== History ==
The area was settled in the mid-1830s. Galloway Station, as it was originally known, was a stop along the Memphis & Little Rock Railroad and was named in the 1870s for the local farmer and businessman Walter A Galloway. W.A Galloway owned and operated a General Store there until the 1890s.

== Today ==
Today the area is located within the city limits of North Little Rock, Arkansas near Young Township and Scott, Arkansas. It is the location to several Trucking stops as well as distribution centers for Amazon (company), Dollar General, and Lowe's. Historic locations within the area include the Fred and Lucy Alexander Schaer House and Longbridge Plantation, Harper-Alexander House, as well as the Ashley-Alexander House and Marlsgate Dortch Plantation in nearby Scott, Arkansas.
