= List of presidential trips made by Bill Clinton (1995) =

This is a list of presidential trips made by Bill Clinton during 1995, the third year of his presidency as the 42nd president of the United States. International trips are highlighted in blue.

This list excludes trips made within Washington, D.C., the U.S. federal capital in which the White House, the official residence and principal workplace of the president, is located. It also excludes the capital's immediate surroundings in Maryland and Virginia, such as Andrews Air Force Base in Maryland, where the president typically boards Air Force One for all trips outside the area. Also excluded are trips to Camp David, the country residence of the president.

== January ==
State or country	Areas visited	Dates	Details
South Carolina	Hilton Head	December 31–January 1	Holiday vacation.
Arkansas	Little Rock, Cotton Plant, Scott, Hope, Sherwood	January 2–4	Stayed with his mother-in-law, Dorothy Howell Rodham. Went duck hunting on a farm in Cotton Plant. Visited Cotham's Mercantile Store. In Hope, visited the graves of his parents and grandparents at Rose Hill Cemetery, and the bedside of his great-uncle Henry "Buddy" Grisham at Medical Park Hospital. Attended the dedication ceremony for the new William Jefferson Clinton Elementary Magnet School in Sherwood.
Illinois	Galesburg	January 10	Visited Carl Sandburg College, where he discussed his Middle Class Bill of Rights plan. Spoke at Galesburg High School.
Ohio	Cleveland	January 13	Hosted the White House Conference on Trade and Investment in Central and Eastern Europe at the Stouffer Renaissance Cleveland Hotel. Visited Sokolowski's University Inn.
Colorado	Denver	January 16	Commemorated Martin Luther King Jr. Day at the Denver Civic Center Greek Amphitheater. Attended a reception at the Colorado Governor's Mansion.
California	Los Angeles, Santa Monica, Roseville, Rio Linda	January 16–17	Commemorated Martin Luther King Jr. Day at Community Build in South Central Los Angeles. Stayed at the Miramar Sheraton Hotel, where he met with Rosa Parks. Spoke at California State University, Northridge's Oviatt Library on the first anniversary of the 1994 Northridge earthquake, which had devastated the campus. Met with earthquake first responders at Los Angeles Fire Department Fire Station 88. Toured areas of Roseville affected by flooding. Visited Community United Methodist Church and Archway Frosty Drive-In in Rio Linda.
Pennsylvania	Kutztown	January 25	Spoke at Kutztown University's Keystone Gymnasium.
Massachusetts	Boston	January 31	Took questions from the Mayor's Youth Council at the George Parkman House. Attended the New England Presidential Dinner at the Boston Park Plaza Hotel.

== February ==
State or country	Areas visited	Dates	Details
California	San Francisco, San Bernardino, Indian Wells, La Quinta	February 14–15	Addressed the American Council on Education conference at the Hyatt Regency San Francisco. Spoke on education policy at San Bernardino Valley College's Snyder Gymnasium. Stayed at the Hyatt Grand Champion Hotel in Indian Wells. Participated in the Bob Hope Chrysler Classic at the La Quinta Country Club, becoming the first sitting president to play PGA Tour golf; his opponents included former presidents George H. W. Bush and Gerald Ford.
Canada	Ottawa	February 23–24	State visit. Met with Governor General Roméo LeBlanc and Prime Minister Jean Chrétien. Addressed Parliament.

== March ==
State or country	Areas visited	Dates	Details
Georgia	Atlanta	March 28–29	Addressed the Atlanta Committee for the Olympic Games at the Inforum Technology Center. Attended a meeting on affirmative action at the Georgia Governor's Mansion, where he stayed overnight. Addressed the Southern Regional Economic Conference at Emory University's Cannon Chapel, and spoke to students at the university's Woodruff Physical Education Center.
Florida	Tallahassee, Tampa, Palm Beach Gardens	March 29–31	Stayed at the Florida Governor's Mansion. Addressed a joint session of the Florida Legislature at the State Capitol. Spoke at Hillsborough Community College's Dale Mabry Campus gymnasium. Stayed at the PGA National Resort.
Haiti	Port-au-Prince	March 31	Attended transition ceremony for United Nations Mission in Haiti.
Arkansas	Little Rock, Jonesboro	March 31–April 4	Stayed at Dorothy Howell Rodham's home. Recorded a radio address on education from the Gibbs Magnet School of International Studies. Visited Doe's Eat Place, where he watched on television as the Arkansas Razorbacks won the NCAA men's basketball tournament semifinal and was interviewed about the game on ESPN. Visited the Arkansas Governor's Mansion. Attended the dedication of the Dean B. Ellis Library at Arkansas State University. Visited Juanita's, where he watched on television as the Razorbacks lost the championship and was interviewed about the game by CBS Sports.

== April ==
State or country	Areas visited	Dates	Details
Texas	Dallas	April 7	Took questions at the American Society of Newspaper Editors convention at the Loews Anatole Hotel. Attended a DNC luncheon at the Mansion on Turtle Creek. Toured a neighborhood restoration project by local AmeriCorps volunteers and spoke to them at Fair Park.
California	Sacramento, Los Angeles, Beverly Hills	April 7–9	Attended a California Democratic Party fundraiser at a private residence in Sacramento. Stayed at the Sacramento Hilton. Addressed the California Democratic Party annual convention at the Sacramento Convention Center Complex. Addressed the National Education Association School Safety Summit at the Century Plaza Hotel. Attended a DNC dinner at Steven Spielberg's home in Pacific Palisades, where he stayed overnight. Attended Palm Sunday service at the Cathedral of Saint Vibiana. Addressed the Jewish National Fund brunch at the Beverly Wilshire Hotel.
Georgia	Warm Springs	April 12	Visited the Little White House on the 50th anniversary of President Franklin D. Roosevelt's death there, where he presented the Four Freedoms Award to several recipients.
Maryland	Havre de Grace	April 21	Celebrated Earth Day at the Duck Decoy Museum at Concord Point Light.
Oklahoma	Oklahoma City	April 23	Attended a memorial service for the victims of the Oklahoma City bombing four days earlier, and met with first responders and victims' families, at Fairgrounds Arena.
Minnesota	St. Paul, Minneapolis	April 23–24	Stayed at the Saint Paul Hotel. Addressed the American Association of Community Colleges conference at the Minneapolis Convention Center. Visited a local restaurant, Peter's Grill.
Iowa	Des Moines, Ames	April 24–25	Met with the editorial board of the Des Moines Register. Stayed at the Savery Hotel. Addressed the National Rural Conference at Iowa State University's Memorial Union, then spoke to university students at the Hilton Coliseum. Addressed a joint session of the Iowa General Assembly at the State Capitol.
Virginia	Williamsburg	April 29	Attended the Democratic Policy Committee retreat at Kingsmill Resort.
New York	New York	April 30	Commemorated the 50th anniversary of the liberation of Nazi concentration camps in an event with Holocaust survivors at the Paramount Theater. Attended a World Jewish Congress dinner at the Waldorf Astoria New York.

== May ==
State or country	Areas visited	Dates	Details
Michigan	East Lansing	May 5	Gave the commencement address at Michigan State University's Spartan Stadium.
Russia	Moscow	May 9–11	Summit meeting. Attended the 50th anniversary of VE Day ceremonies.
Ukraine	Kyiv	May 11–12	State visit. Met with President Leonid Kuchma.
Maryland	White Plains	May 17	Marked the first anniversary of the School-to-Work Opportunities Act of 1994 at a local business, Automated Graphics Systems, Inc.
Colorado	Colorado Springs	May 31	Gave the commencement address at the United States Air Force Academy's Falcon Stadium. Met with servicemembers at Peterson Air Force Base.
Montana	Billings, Broadview	May 31–June 2	Spoke at Montana State University's Alterowitz Gymnasium. Stayed at the Sheraton hotel in Billings. Visited the Intermountain Equestrian Center, where he went horseback riding. Met with farmers and agricultural leaders at the Leslie Auer farm in Broadview. Conducted a townhall meeting with local residents at KTVQ studios.

== June ==
State or country	Areas visited	Dates	Details
Maryland	Baltimore	June 6	Addressed the National Governors Association Summit on Young Children at the Stouffer Renaissance Harbor Place.
New Hampshire	Hanover, Claremont	June 11	Gave the commencement address at Dartmouth College's Memorial Field. Participated in a debate against Speaker of the House Newt Gingrich at the Earl Bourdon Senior Centre in Claremont.
Massachusetts	Boston	June 11	Attended a fundraiser for Senator John Kerry at the Boston Park Plaza Hotel.
Canada	Halifax	June 15–17	Attended the 21st G7 summit. Met with Russian President Boris Yeltsin.
New Jersey	Edison, Somerset	June 22	Toured Ford Motor Company's Edison Assembly plant. Attended a fundraising dinner at the Garden State Convention Center in Somerset.
Arkansas	Little Rock, Pine Bluff	June 22–25	Attended an "America's Hope, Arkansas' Pride" luncheon at the Excelsior Hotel in Little Rock. Threw out the ceremonial first pitch at the National Amateur All-Star Baseball Tournament at Taylor Field.
California	San Francisco	June 25–26	Commemorated the 50th anniversary of the United Nations Conference on International Organization and the signing of the Charter of the United Nations, with events at the War Memorial Opera House (where the conference was held) and the Herbst Theatre (where the charter was signed). Hosted Polish president Lech Wałęsa at the Herbst Theatre. Attended a dinner at the home of Walter Shorenstein, chair of the UN 50 National Committee that had organized the events.
Oregon	Portland	June 26–27	Addressed the Pacific Rim Economic Conference at Portland State University's Smith Memorial Student Union, then addressed university students in the courtyard.
Illinois	Chicago	June 29–30	Attended a fundraiser at the Chicago Hilton and Towers. Presented the Abraham Lincoln Courage Award in a ceremony at Chicago Police Department 15th District Headquarters. Addressed the American Association of Physicians of Indian Origin conference at the Sheraton hotel.
Florida	Miami	June 30–July 1	Visited his brother-in-law Tony Rodham, whose son Zachary had recently been born.

== July ==
State or country	Areas visited	Dates	Details
Connecticut	New Haven	July 1	Opened the 1995 Special Olympics World Summer Games at the Yale Bowl.
Tennessee	Nashville	July 10	Addressed the Family Re-Union conference at the Tennessee Performing Arts Center's James K. Polk Theater. Visited Pauline LaFon Gore, who was recovering from a heart attack, at Vanderbilt University Medical Center.
Vermont	Burlington	July 31	Addressed the National Governors Association conference at the Sheraton hotel.

== August ==
State or country	Areas visited	Dates	Details
Maryland	Baltimore	August 8	Spoke about environmental protection at Fort Armistead Park.
North Carolina	Charlotte	August 9	Addressed the Progressive National Baptist Convention at the Charlotte Convention Center. Visited a local nonprofit, Teen Health Connection.
Wyoming	Jackson, Park County	August 15–31	Summer vacation. Returned to Washington briefly to attend the funeral of Robert C. Frasure and two other diplomats who had died in an automobile accident in Bosnia. Celebrated the 79th anniversary of the National Park Service with an event at Old Faithful Lodge in Yellowstone National Park. Celebrated the 75th anniversary of the ratification of the 19th Amendment at Jackson Lake Lodge.
Hawaii	Honolulu	August 31–September 3	Reviewed troops at Wheeler Army Airfield. Commemorated the 50th anniversary of the Japanese Instrument of Surrender ending World War II, with events at the National Memorial Cemetery of the Pacific, aboard the USS Carl Vinson at Naval Station Pearl Harbor, and at the Waikiki Shell.

== September ==
State or country	Areas visited	Dates	Details
California	San Jose, Monterey, Pleasanton, Selma, Fresno	September 3–5	Attended the dedication of the new California State University, Monterey Bay. Visited a Labor Day picnic at the Alameda County Fairgrounds. Took questions from students at Abraham Lincoln Middle School in Selma. Met with agricultural leaders at Fresno Air Terminal.
Maryland	Baltimore	September 6	Attended the Baltimore Orioles–California Angels game at Oriole Park at Camden Yards where Cal Ripken Jr. broke the Major League Baseball record for longest streak of consecutive games played.
Illinois	Carbondale	September 11	Participated in a roundtable discussion on student loans at Southern Illinois University Carbondale's Pulliam Hall.
Maryland	Elkridge	September 13	Addressed the National Family Partnership at Mayfield Woods Middle School.
Pennsylvania	Philadelphia	September 18	Met with ministers and community leaders at Mount Carmel Baptist Church. Attended a fundraiser at the Wyndham Franklin Plaza Hotel.
Florida	Jacksonville, North Miami Beach	September 18–19	Spoke at the Carvill Park Community Center in Jacksonville. Participated in a roundtable discussion with seniors at the Point East Senior Center in North Miami Beach. Spoke at the Sheraton Bal Harbour.
Colorado	Denver, Pueblo	September 19–20	Took questions at the Little Sisters of the Poor Home for the Aged in Denver. Spoke at Pueblo Community College. Attended a re-election campaign event at the Denver Marriott.
California	San Francisco, Culver City, Los Angeles, Santa Ana, San Diego	September 20–22	Visited the Exploratorium. Campaigned at the Fairmont San Francisco and the Century Plaza Hotel in Los Angeles. Appeared on Larry King Live at Westwood One studios. Spoke at the Boys & Girls Club of Santa Ana and at the O'Farrell Community School.
Pennsylvania	Lake Winola	September 24	Visited his wife's relatives.

== October ==
State or country	Areas visited	Dates	Details
New Jersey	Newark	October 4	Welcomed Pope John Paul II to the United States at the Cathedral Basilica of the Sacred Heart.
Massachusetts	Martha's Vineyard	October 6–8	
Virginia	Williamsburg	October 13	Addressed The Business Council at the Williamsburg Inn.
Connecticut	Storrs	October 15	Attended the dedication ceremony of the Thomas J. Dodd Archives and Research Center at the University of Connecticut, and spoke at the Harry A. Gampel Pavilion.
Texas	Austin, Dallas	October 15–16	Spoke at the University of Texas at Austin's Frank Erwin Center. Attended a luncheon at Le Méridien Dallas.
California	Los Angeles	October 16–17	Attended Tony Bennett's Here's to the Ladies, a Concert of Hope at Hollywood Pantages Theatre.
Texas	San Antonio, Houston	October 17	Met with the crew that was decommissioning Kelly Air Force Base. Attended a dinner at the Westin Galleria Houston.
Maryland	Baltimore	October 18	Attended a fundraising dinner at a private residence.
Ohio	Columbus	October 20	Addressed the Midwest Economic Conference at Ohio State University's Fawcett Center, and gave a speech on the university oval.
Iowa	Des Moines, Cedar Rapids	October 20–21	Attended a Jefferson–Jackson Dinner at Veterans Memorial Auditorium. Dedicated the new National Czech & Slovak Museum & Library, alongside Czech president Václav Havel and Slovak president Michal Kováč.
New York	New York, Hyde Park	October 22–24	Commemorated the 50th anniversary of the United Nations with an address to the UN General Assembly. Hosted Russian president Boris Yeltsin at the Franklin D. Roosevelt Presidential Library and Museum. Addressed the AFL-CIO convention at the Sheraton New York Hotel and Towers.

== November ==
State or country	Areas visited	Dates	Details
Israel	Jerusalem	November 5–6	Attended the funeral of Prime Minister Yitzhak Rabin.
United Kingdom	London, Belfast, Derry	November 28 – December 1	Met with Queen Elizabeth II and Prime Minister John Major. Addressed Parliament. Delivered several public addresses in Northern Ireland.

== December ==
State or country	Areas visited	Dates	Details
Ireland	Dublin	December 1–2	Met with President Mary Robinson and Taoiseach John Bruton.
Germany	Baumholder	December 2	Addressed U.S. military personnel. Met with Chancellor Helmut Kohl.
Spain	Madrid	December 2–3	Attended the European Union Summit Meeting.
Arkansas	Fayetteville, Little Rock	December 9–10	Attended an Arkansas Razorbacks men's basketball game at Bud Walton Arena. Attended a dinner for Senator David Pryor at the Statehouse Convention Center.
France	Paris	December 14	Attended the signing of the Bosnian peace treaty.
South Carolina	Hilton Head	December 31–January 1	Holiday vacation.
