= All Souls Church (Scott, Arkansas) =

Historic church in Arkansas, United States

- U.S. National Register of Historic Places
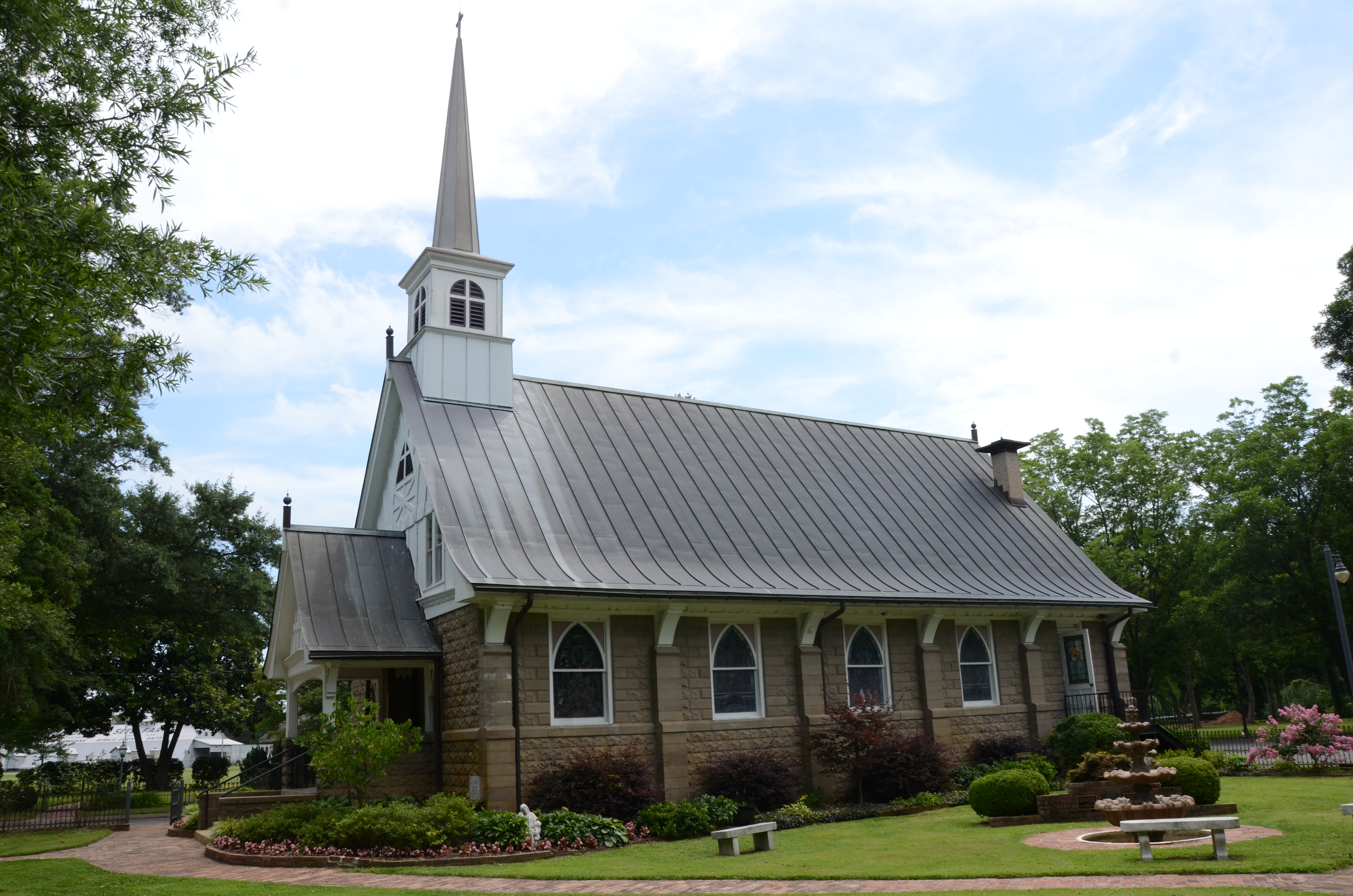

- Location within Arkansas Location within the United States
- Location: AR 161, Scott, Arkansas
- Coordinates: 34°41′56″N 92°5′47″W
- Area: 2 acres (0.81 ha)
- Built: 1906
- Architect: Charles L. Thompson
- Architectural style: Late Gothic Revival
- NRHP reference No.: 77000275
- Added to NRHP: August 12, 1977

All Souls Church is a historic church built in 1906, located on Arkansas Highway 161, and United States Route 165 in Scott, Arkansas.

== History ==
The religious needs of what became the Scott community were initially met by the 1880 construction of the Old Liberty Church, which was linked to the Methodist Episcopal Church, South. This served until after the beginning of the twentieth century, when it closed, in part because of the poor roads in the area and the long distances the residents of the scattered plantations that made up the congregation had to traverse.

In October 1905, the women of Scott established a Sunday school in an old store building adjacent to the present All Souls Church. Attendance rose from seventeen to eighty in six months, leading area planters to establish a community church that would use preachers from the Methodist, Baptist, Episcopal, Presbyterian, and Christian (Disciples of Christ) denominations to officiate on a rotating basis, since none of the faiths could support a church of their own. Conoway Scott donated land for a new church building, and Charles N. Alexander donated construction materials.

The congregation hired Charles L. Thompson, who designed Marlsgate Plantation in Scott, to draw up plans for the building. George Leifer was hired as builder, and the cornerstone was laid on June 27, 1906. The first service in All Souls Church was held on January 13, 1907, led by Methodist minister Forney Hutchinson.

The church building is a wood-framed structure with a buttressed ashlar stone exterior and a slate roof. Charles L. Thompson chose the Gothic Revival style as the primary influence for his design of the church, which can be seen in the pointed-arched windows and the steep roofline. The church is a well-preserved example of vernacular Gothic architecture styling in a rural setting. It incorporates elements of the Tudor Revival style, seen in the use of half-timbered gable ends and slightly flared eaves. The building was listed on the National Register of Historic Places on August 12, 1977.

It has maintained a non-denominational Christian ministry since its establishment.

== See also ==
- National Register of Historic Places listings in Pulaski County, Arkansas
