= List of highways numbered 70 =

The following highways are numbered 70:

== International ==
- AH70 Asian Highway 70
- E70 European route E70
- Arab Mashreq route M70

== Australia ==
- Peak Downs Highway – Queensland State Route 70 (Regional)
- Sunshine Motorway – Queensland State Route 70 (Sunshine Coast)
- Sparks Road

== Brazil ==
- BR-070

== Canada ==
- Newfoundland and Labrador Route 70
- Quebec Autoroute 70

== China ==
- G70 Expressway

== Croatia ==
- D70 road (Croatia)

== Germany ==
- Bundesautobahn 70
- Bundesstraße 70

== Greece ==
- EO70 road

== India ==
- NH 70

== Ireland ==
- N70 road (Ireland)

== Israel ==
- Highway 70 (Israel)

== Hungary ==
- M70 motorway (Hungary)

== Jordan ==
- Highway 70

== Korea, South ==
- Gukjido 70

== New Zealand ==
- Inland Kaikoura Road

== Norway ==
- Norwegian National Road 70

== Philippines ==
- N70 highway (Philippines)

== Spain ==
- Autovía A-70
- Autovía CV-70

== South Africa ==
- R70 road (South Africa)

== United Kingdom ==
- A70 road

== United States ==
- Interstate 70
  - Interstate 70N (Maryland) (former proposal)
  - Interstate 70S (District of Columbia–Maryland) (former proposal)
  - Interstate 70S (Pennsylvania) (former)
- U.S. Route 70
- Alabama State Route 70
  - County Route 70 (Lee County, Alabama)
- California State Route 70
- Colorado State Highway 70 (1923-1968) (former)
- Connecticut Route 70
- Florida State Road 70
- Georgia State Route 70
  - Georgia State Route 70 (1932–1941) (former)
- Illinois Route 70
- Indiana State Road 70
- Iowa Highway 70
- K-70 (Kansas highway) (former)
- Kentucky Route 70
- Louisiana Highway 70
- Maryland Route 70
  - Maryland Route 70B (former)
  - Maryland Route 70C
- Massachusetts Route 70
- M-70 (Michigan highway) (former)
- Minnesota State Highway 70
  - County Road 70 (Dakota County, Minnesota)
  - County Road 70 (Hennepin County, Minnesota)
- Missouri Route 70 (1922) (former)
- Nebraska Highway 70
- Nevada State Route 70 (former)
- New Jersey Route 70
  - County Route 70 (Bergen County, New Jersey)
- New York State Route 70
  - County Route 70 (Chautauqua County, New York)
  - County Route 70 (Dutchess County, New York)
  - County Route 70 (Livingston County, New York)
  - County Route 70 (Madison County, New York)
  - County Route 70 (Oneida County, New York)
  - County Route 70 (Orleans County, New York)
  - County Route 70 (Putnam County, New York)
  - County Route 70 (Saratoga County, New York)
  - County Route 70 (Suffolk County, New York)
  - County Route 70 (Warren County, New York)
- North Carolina Highway 70 (former)
- Ohio State Route 70 (1923) (former)
- Oklahoma State Highway 70B
- Oklahoma State Highway 70C
- Oklahoma State Highway 70D
- Oklahoma State Highway 70E
- Oklahoma State Highway 70F
- Oregon Route 70
- Pennsylvania Route 70 (former)
- South Carolina Highway 70
- Tennessee State Route 70
- Texas State Highway 70
  - Texas State Highway Loop 70
  - Farm to Market Road 70
  - Texas Park Road 70
- Utah State Route 70 (1931–1977) (former)
- Virginia State Route 70
- Wisconsin Highway 70
- West Virginia Route 70 (1920s) (former)
- Wyoming Highway 70

Territories

- U.S. Virgin Islands Highway 70

== See also ==
- List of highways numbered 70A
- A70 (disambiguation)

Preceded by 69	Lists of highways 70	Succeeded by 71
