= Route 70 (disambiguation) =

Route 70 may refer to:

- KMB Route 70, a bus route in Hong Kong
- London Buses route 70
- Melbourne tram route 70

== See also ==
- List of highways numbered 70
