= Ashley-Alexander House =

Historic house in Arkansas, United States

- U.S. National Register of Historic Places
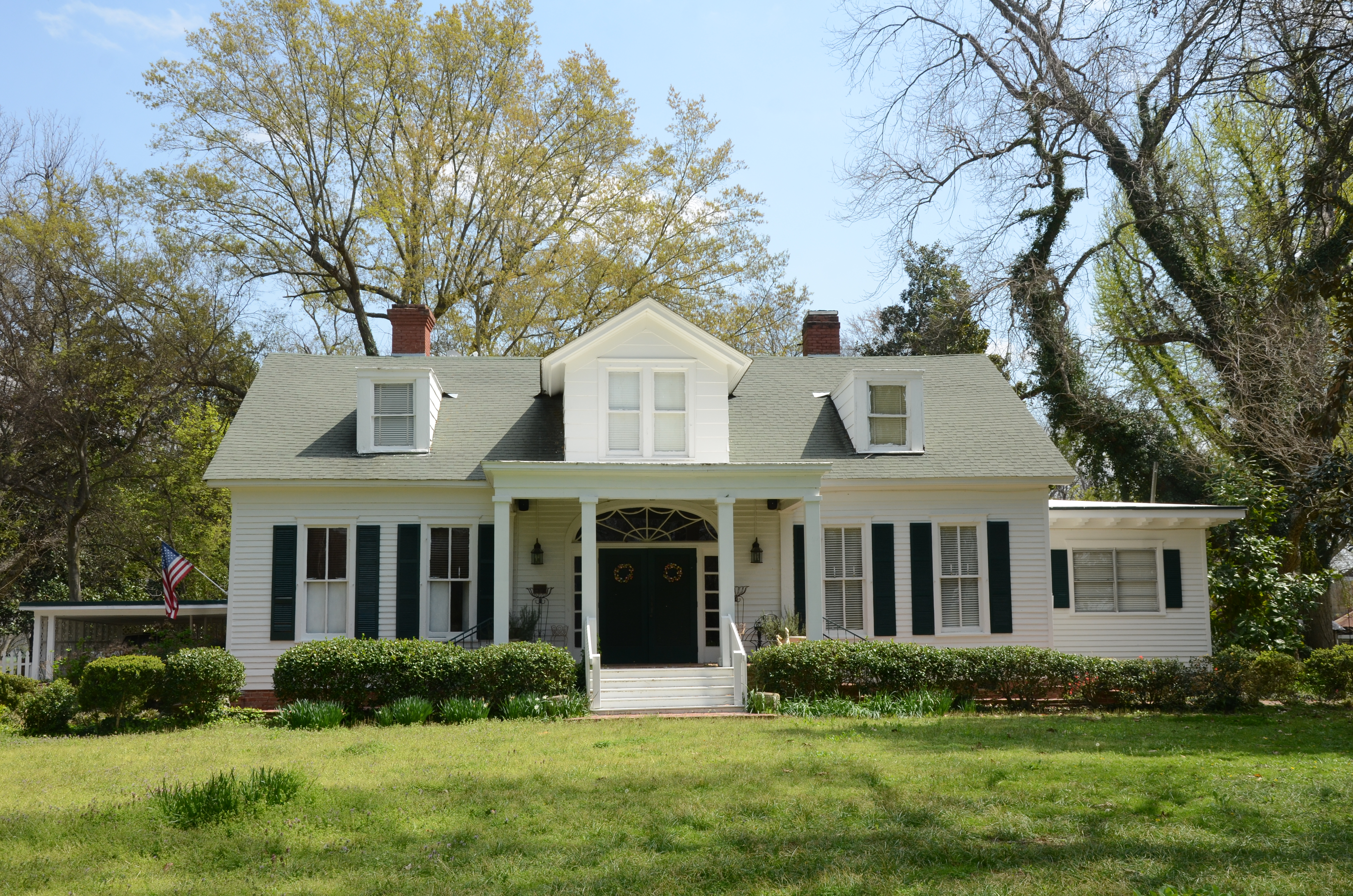

- Location within Arkansas Location within the United States
- Location: 3514 Walkers Corner Rd., near Scott, Arkansas
- Coordinates: 34°42′21″N 92°5′33″W
- Area: less than one acre
- Built: c. 1835
- NRHP reference No.: 76000431
- Added to NRHP: June 18, 1976

The Ashley-Alexander House (also known as the Alexander House) is a historic house located at 3514 Walkers Corner Road (Arkansas Highway 161) near Scott, Arkansas.

== Description ==
The Ashley-Alexander House located just outside Little Rock in Lonoke County is a 1 1/2-story clapboarded log structure, built out of hand-hewn cypress logs and topped by a gable roof, set near the east side of the road. A porch projects from the center of the five-bay facade, with a two-window dormer above, and flanking shed-roof dormers flanking it on the main roof in a Colonial Revival-style. The house is 5,400 square feet with 5 bedrooms and 4 bathrooms and has a history of paranormal activity reports.

== History ==
Originally dubbed the Ashley's Mill Plantation, the home was built around 1835 by Chester Ashley, one of Arkansas's early United States Senators from 1844 to 1848, and a prominent lawyer and local landowner as well as co-founder of the Rose Law Firm. Ashley died in 1848. The home was used as a planation manager's house and was occupied by Ashley's brother, Elisha Pomeroy, who looked after the planation. Another home on the property was occupied by the Ashley family but has since burned down. The Ashley family ran a gristmill and sawmill across from the homestead property, known locally as Ashley's Mills. An American Civil War skirmish occurred near the homestead as Union troops advanced towards Little Rock in September 1863, known as the Skirmish at Ashley's Mills. Historical Civil War Markers suggest Confederate troops camped nearby.

The Ashley family also constructed a residence in the mid-1820s in Little Rock, at the corner of present-day Markham and Scott streets.

The home stayed in the Ashley family until in December 1898 when Arthur Lee Alexander and his wife, Otelia George Alexander, purchased the property for $35,000. A kitchen fire in 1910 was able to be stopped before significant damage was done to the property, but prompted a remodel. Mr. Alexander was a native of Asheville, North Carolina, but moved to Scott, Arkansas to work at the nearby Fred Bryson Plantation in 1889. Mrs. Alexander was a native of Reads Landing, Arkansas, and came from a well-to-do merchant family. The couple raised 5 children at the Ashley-Alexander House. She named the plantation Illallee after a Native American word for "home." Mrs. Alexander continued to live at the home until 1957, when she moved to a smaller home down the street while her son and his family moved into the larger house.

== Present day ==
The home is still owned by a descendent of the Alexander family; a great-grandson of Arthur and Otelia Alexander, whose mother was born in the home in 1907. The home is now used as a wedding and photography venue, with a complete renovation completed in 2021. The Alexander family graciously donated 8 acres of the original plantation land to the Scott Plantation Settlement, an open-air museum with 25 exhibits of buildings and artifacts from the era.

The house was listed on the National Register of Historic Places on June 18, 1976.

== See also ==
- National Register of Historic Places listings in Lonoke County, Arkansas
