= A70 =

A70 or A-70 may refer to:

- A70 road (Great Britain), a major road in the UK
- Autovía A-70, a Spanish motorway
- Benoni Defense, in the Encyclopaedia of Chess Openings
- Bundesautobahn 70, a German motorway also called A 70
- Quebec Autoroute 70, a Canadian highway in the Saguenay region of central Quebec
- Route A70 (WMATA), a bus route operated by the Washington Metropolitan Area Transit Authority
- Samsung Galaxy A70, smartphone released in 2019
- The third generation of the Toyota Supra

== See also ==
- List of highways numbered 70
