= Land's End Plantation (Scott, Arkansas) =

Historic house in Arkansas, United States

- U.S. National Register of Historic Places
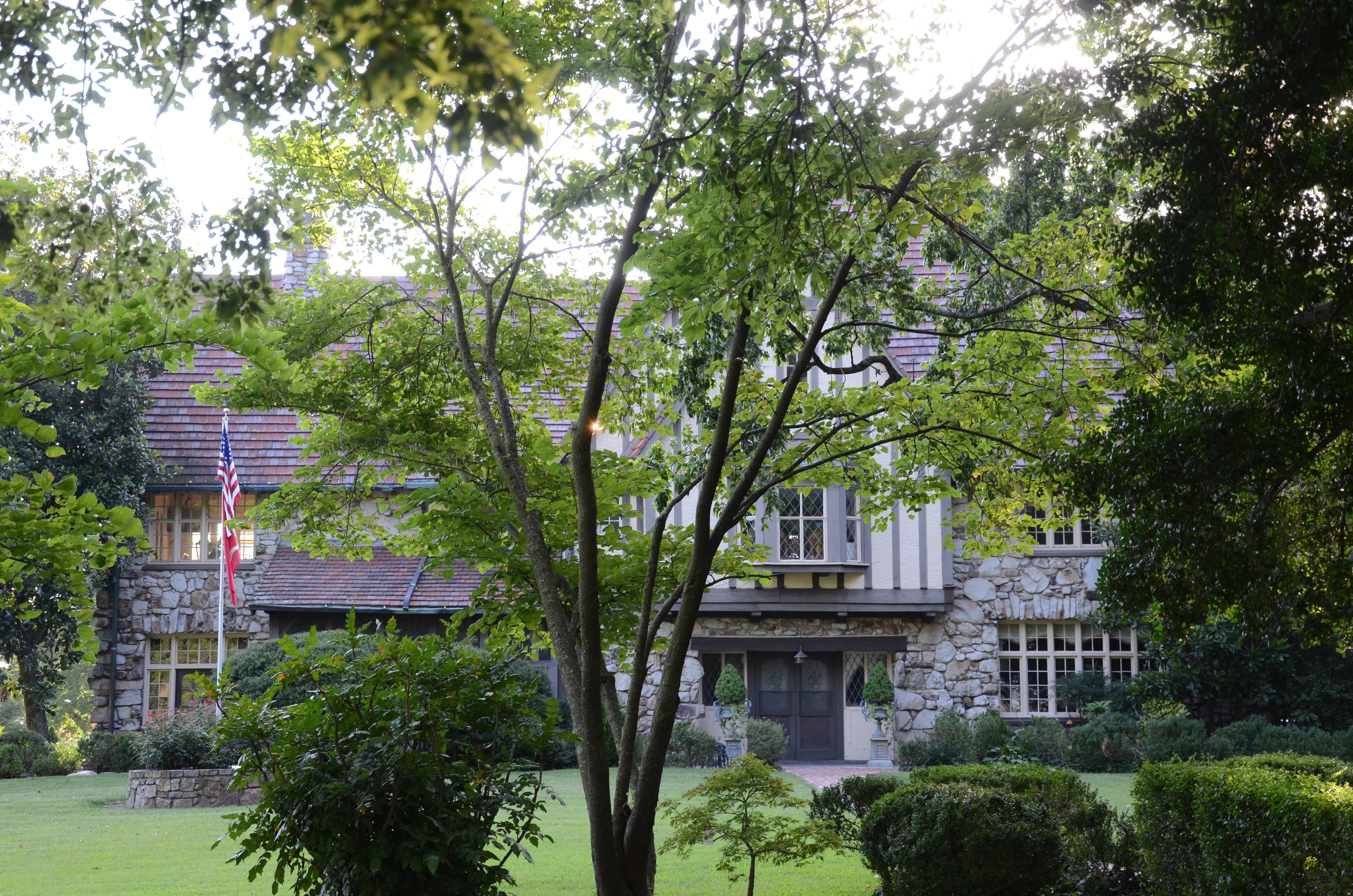

- Location within Arkansas Location within the United States
- Nearest city: Scott, Arkansas
- Coordinates: 34°53′36″N 92°7′8″W
- Area: 5,000 acres (2,000 ha) (entire plantation); 54 acres (22 ha) (listed portion)
- Built: 1925
- Architect: John Parks Almand
- Architectural style: Tudor Revival
- NRHP reference No.: 99000044
- Added to NRHP: January 27, 1999

The Land's End Plantation, also known as James Robert Alexander House, is a historic plantation at 1 Land's End Land in rural southeastern Pulaski County, Arkansas, off Arkansas Highway 161 south of Scott. It is a 5,000-acre (2,000 ha) working plantation, located on the banks of the Arkansas River. The main plantation complex includes a 1925 Tudor Revival house, designed by John Parks Almand, and more than 20 outbuildings. AR 161, which passes close to the main house, is lined by pecan trees planted about 1900 by James Robert Alexander, the plantation owner.

The house and a 54-acre (22 ha) portion of the estate was listed on the National Register of Historic Places in 1999.

== See also ==
- National Register of Historic Places listings in Pulaski County, Arkansas
