= Autovía A-77 =

Motorway in Spain

Autovía A-77

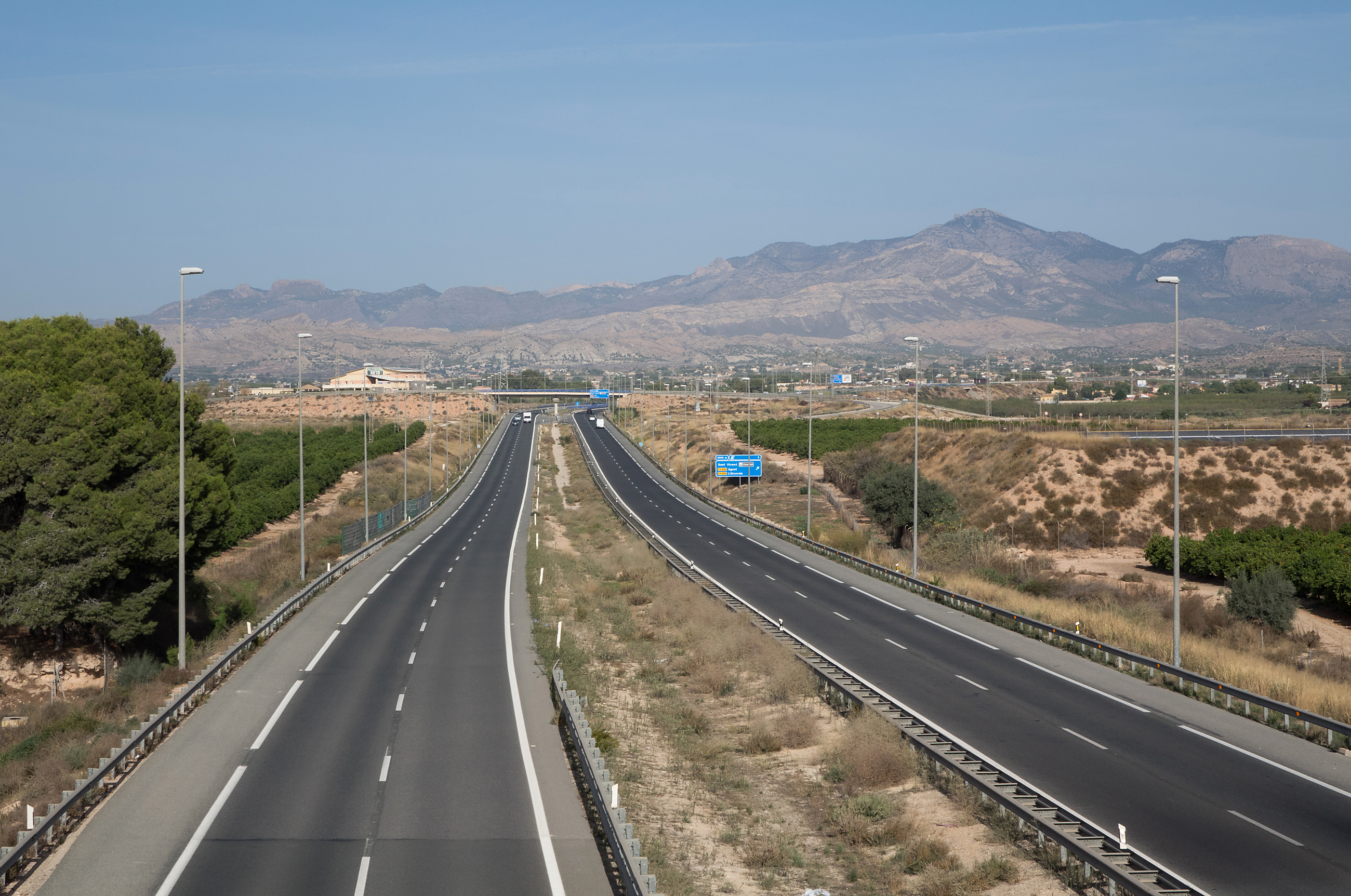
- A-77 highway

Route information
- Length: 7 km (4.3 mi)

Major junctions
- From: Alicante
- J → Autovía A-70; J → Autovía A-7; J → Autopista AP-7
- To: San Vicente del Raspeig

Location
- Country: Spain

Highway system
- Highways in Spain; Autopistas and autovías; National Roads

The Autovía A-77 is a highway in the northwest of Alicante, Spain. Its length is about 7 km. This road runs from the junction with Autovía A-70, in the direction of Alcoy, towards the Autovía A-7 and Autopista AP-7.
