= Catherine Tharp Altvater =

American painter

- Born: July 26, 1907; Little Rock, Arkansas
- Died: October 9, 1984 (aged 77); New Smyrna Beach, Florida
- Education: National Academy of Design School, Grand Central School of Contemporary Arts, Art League of Long Island
- Known for: Watercolor and oil painting
- Awards: Emily Lowe Memorial Award, Audubon Artists

Catherine Tharp Altvater (July 26, 1907 – October 9, 1984) was an American oil painter and watercolorist. Her watercolor paintings hang in the Museum of Modern Art and several other museums. Altvater was the first woman to hold office in the American Watercolor Society.

== Biography ==
She was born in Little Rock, Arkansas in 1907. She was married to Wellington Scott and Fredrick Lang Altvater and lived in the Hudson River Valley, New York and Long Island, New York most of her professional life.

Altvater painted in both watercolor and oils and, from 1947 through 1967, won more than fifty awards, including first prize in watercolors at the National Arts Club in New York for 1969. Altvater was best known for her colorful floral still-life paintings (White Lilies in the Rain, Hymn to the Sun), landscapes (Golden Dawn), and architectural scenes. Altvater's work was exhibited at the Metropolitan Museum of Art, National Academy of Fine Arts, National Arts Club, Audubon Artists Royal Watercolor Society (London), Parrish Museum (New York), and the Mexico City Museum of Art. Her paintings were included in the American Watercolor Society's traveling exhibitions.

She founded the Mid-Southern Watercolorists in Little Rock in 1970, with artists Doris Williamson Mapes, Bruce R. Anderson, Josephine Graham, and Edwin C. Brewer. She lived outside of Scott, Arkansas in Lonoke County for ten years.

She retired to New Smyrna Beach, Florida and died there October 9, 1984.
