= Scott, Arkansas =

- Census-designated place
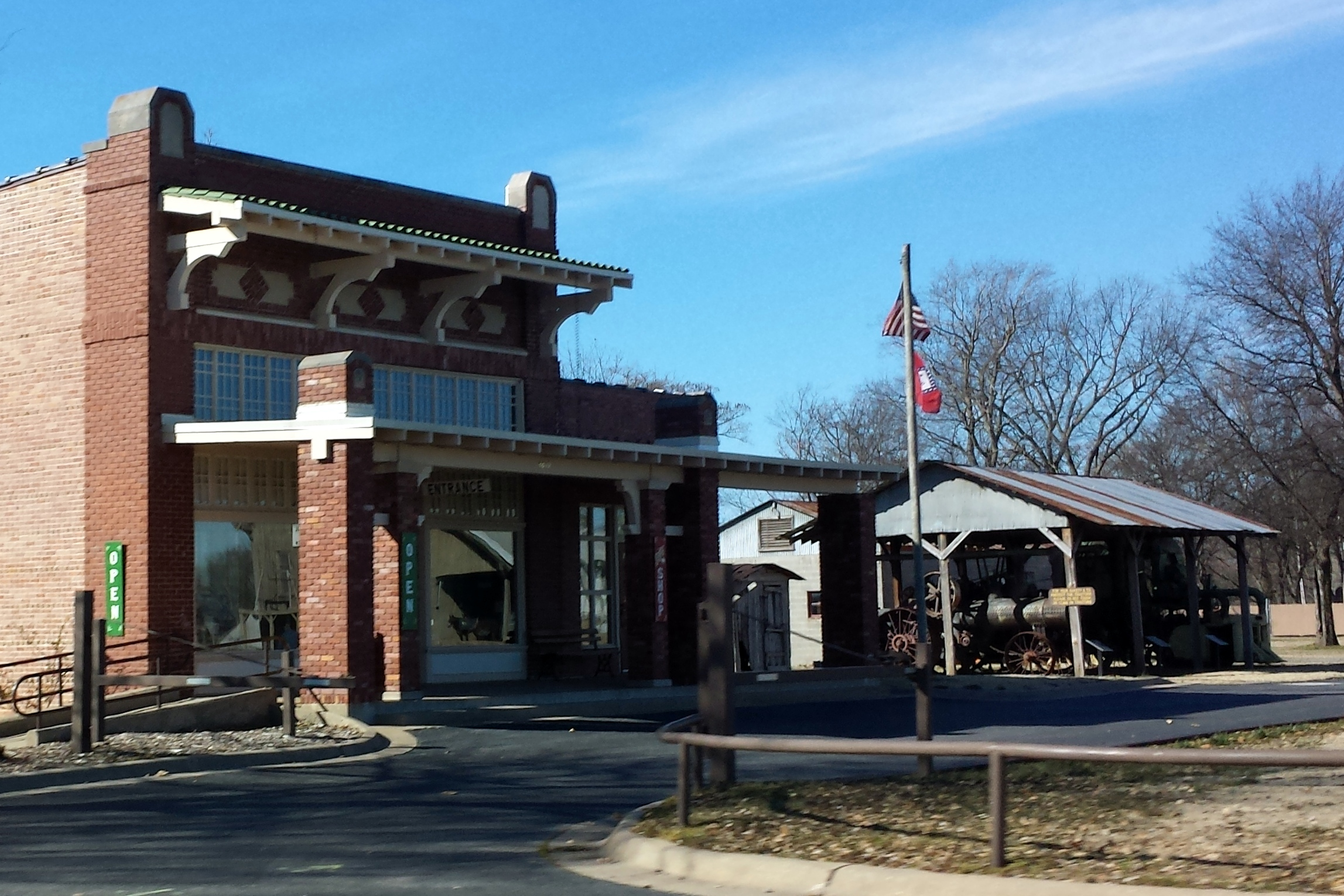
- Plantation Agriculture Museum operated by the Arkansas Department of Parks, Heritage and Tourism

- Location in Lonoke County and the state of Arkansas

- Location in the United States
- Coordinates: 34°41′48″N 92°05′38″W
- Country: United States
- State: Arkansas
- Counties: Pulaski, Lonoke

Area
  - Total: 3.31 sq mi (8.57 km^{2})
  - Land: 3.16 sq mi (8.19 km^{2})
  - Water: 0.15 sq mi (0.38 km^{2})
- Elevation: 243 ft (74 m)

Population (2020)
  - Total: 97
  - Density: 30.7/sq mi (11.84/km^{2})
- Time zone: UTC-6 (Central (CST))
  - Summer (DST): UTC-5 (CDT)
- ZIP code: 72142
- Area code: 501
- FIPS code: 05-62900
- GNIS feature ID: 2402831

Scott is an unincorporated community and census-designated place (CDP) in Lonoke and Pulaski counties in the central part of the U.S. state of Arkansas. Per the 2020 census, the population was 97. It is part of the Little Rock–North Little Rock–Conway Metropolitan Statistical Area.

== History ==
More than 1,000 years ago, a complex formation of mounds was created near what is now called Mound Pond by what is today known as the Plum Bayou culture, a Pre-Columbian Native American culture that lived in what is now east-central Arkansas from 650–1050 CE, a time known as the Late Woodland Period. Archaeologists defined the culture based on the Toltec Mounds site The site was farmed in the nineteenth century but was later preserved as Plum Bayou Mounds Archeological State Park.

The Arkansas River not only created distinctive oxbow lakes, but it also provided rich farmland that was attractive to the first white settlers in Arkansas Territory. Peter L. Lefevre and family were among the very first French settlers, locating in the fall of 1818 on the north side of the river on Spanish Grant No. 497, about six miles below Little Rock. Chester Ashley was one of the first investors to acquire land in the area for plantation purposes in the early 1800s. Conoway Scott Sr., for whom the community is named, arrived in the 1830s. Thomas Steele began his plantation in the area in 1850.

The Marmaduke–Walker duel occurred in the area on September 6, 1863, on the Lefevre Plantation, just east of the Lefevre House. The duel was fought between John S. Marmaduke and Lucius M. Walker, two generals in the Confederate States Army. Tension had risen between the two officers during the Battle of Helena on July 4, 1863, when Marmaduke accused Walker of not supporting his force, and then retaliated by not informing Walker of a Confederate retreat. Marmaduke was later assigned to serve under Walker during a Union advance against Little Rock. Walker did not support Marmaduke during a retreat after the Battle of Brownsville, and Marmaduke questioned Walker's courage after the Battle of Bayou Meto on August 27. A series of notes passed between the two generals by friends resulted in a duel, during which Marmaduke fatally wounded Walker. Marmaduke was arrested and charged with murder, but was soon released and later the charge was dropped.

The Skirmish at Ashley's Mills, also known as the Skirmish at Ferry Landing, was an engagement that was fought between Union Army and Confederate States Army cavalry regiments in Arkansas on September 7, 1863, during the American Civil War. Federal troops approached Little Rock from the north, encountering resistance from Confederate forces at Battle of Brownsville, Arkansas on August 25 and at Bayou Meto, near present-day Jacksonville, Arkansas on August 27. Union Brigadier-General John W. Davidson commanding the cavalry division of the Union Army of Arkansas sent the 7th Missouri Volunteer Cavalry Regiment as his lead regiment to clear the 5th Arkansas Cavalry Regiment, under the temporary command of Major John Bull while Colonel Robert C. Newton was in temporary brigade command, from its position guarding a crossing of the Arkansas River near Little Rock, Arkansas. The Union cavalry forced the Confederates to retreat which opened the route to the east of the river, leading to the Battle of Bayou Fourche on September 10, 1863, and the capture of Little Rock by the Union Army of Arkansas under the command of Major General Frederick Steele. The Confederate regiment's casualties were 1 killed, 3 wounded and 2 captured while the Union regiment reported no casualties.

The St. Louis Southwestern Railway (known as the Cotton Belt Route) was constructed through the Scott area in 1871. The new station was located on the property of Conoway Scott Sr. The railroad depot was called Scott’s Station (or Scott’s Crossing).

In 1912, Conoway Scott Jr. built a large brick building, intending to house a general store. The store later opened under the Foster Family as Foster's General Store. A post office was added to the store in 1929. Later the name of the surrounding community was shortened to Scott.

== Geography ==
Scott is located in western Lonoke County and eastern Pulaski County and is bordered to the west by the city of North Little Rock. U.S. Route 165 passes through the community, leading northwest approximately 4 miles (6.4 km) to Interstate 440 and southeast 8 miles (13 km) to Keo. Downtown Little Rock is 12 miles (19 km) west of Scott. Downtown North Little Rock, Arkansas is 10 miles (16 km) west. Interstate 40 in Arkansas is 11 miles (18 km) north at Galloway, Arkansas. Arkansas Highway 161 runs concurrently with the Lonoke-Pulaski county line in the community, progressing northward to U.S. Route 70 and southeast to England, by way of farming areas in southeast Pulaski County.

According to the United States Census Bureau, the Scott CDP has a total area of 3.3 square miles (8.5 km^{2}), of which 3.2 square miles (8.3 km^{2}) are land and 0.15 square miles (0.39 km^{2}) (4.52%) are water. The CDP's portion in Pulaski County is bisected by Horseshoe Lake, an oxbow lake that was once a channel of the Arkansas River.

== Demographics ==
Historical population
Census	Pop.	Note	%±
2000	94		—
2010	72		−23.4%
2020	97		34.7%
U.S. Decennial Census; 2010 2020

=== 2020 census ===
Scott CDP, Arkansas – Racial and ethnic composition Note: the U.S. census treats Hispanic/Latino as an ethnic category. This table excludes Latinos from the racial categories and assigns them to a separate category. Hispanics/Latinos may be of any race.
Race / Ethnicity (NH = Non-Hispanic)	Pop 2010	Pop 2020	% 2010	% 2020
White alone (NH)	37	51	51.39%	52.58%
Black or African American alone (NH)	30	29	41.67%	29.90%
Native American or Alaska Native alone (NH)	0	0	0.00%	0.00%
Asian alone (NH)	0	0	0.00%	0.00%
Pacific Islander alone (NH)	0	1	0.00%	1.03%
Some Other Race alone (NH)	0	0	0.00%	0.00%
Mixed Race or Multi-Racial (NH)	0	10	0.00%	10.31%
Hispanic or Latino (any race)	5	6	6.94%	6.19%
Total	72	97	100.00%	100.00%

=== 2000 Census ===
As of the census of 2000, there were 94 people, 40 households, and 29 families residing in the CDP. The population density was 15.7 people per square mile (6.1/km^{2}). There were 46 housing units at an average density of 7.7/sq mi (3.0/km^{2}). The racial makeup of the CDP was 64.89% White, 34.04% Black or African American, and 1.06% from two or more races.

There were 40 households, out of which 30.0% had children under the age of 18 living with them, 50.0% were married couples living together, 20.0% had a female householder with no husband present, and 27.5% were non-families. 20.0% of all households were made up of individuals, and none had someone living alone who was 65 years of age or older. The average household size was 2.35 and the average family size was 2.76.

In the CDP, the population was spread out, with 25.5% under the age of 18, 6.4% from 18 to 24, 26.6% from 25 to 44, 37.2% from 45 to 64, and 4.3% who were 65 years of age or older. The median age was 43 years. For every 100 females, there were 84.3 males. For every 100 females age 18 and over, there were 89.2 males.

The median income for a household in the CDP was $24,821, and the median income for a family was $32,321. Males had a median income of $16,786 versus $19,464 for females. The per capita income for the CDP was $10,912. None of the population and none of the families were below the poverty line.

== Education ==
Scott CDP is served by the Pulaski County Special School District; however, it does not maintain a school in the area. Previously, the district operated an elementary and a high school in Scott. Since its PCSSD closure, the former Scott Elementary School has reopened as a charter school operated by Maumelle-based Academics Plus Charter Schools, with the campus serving students in kindergarten through sixth grade.

The zoned schools are Harris Elementary School, Mills Middle School, and Wilbur D. Mills High School.

== Points of interest ==
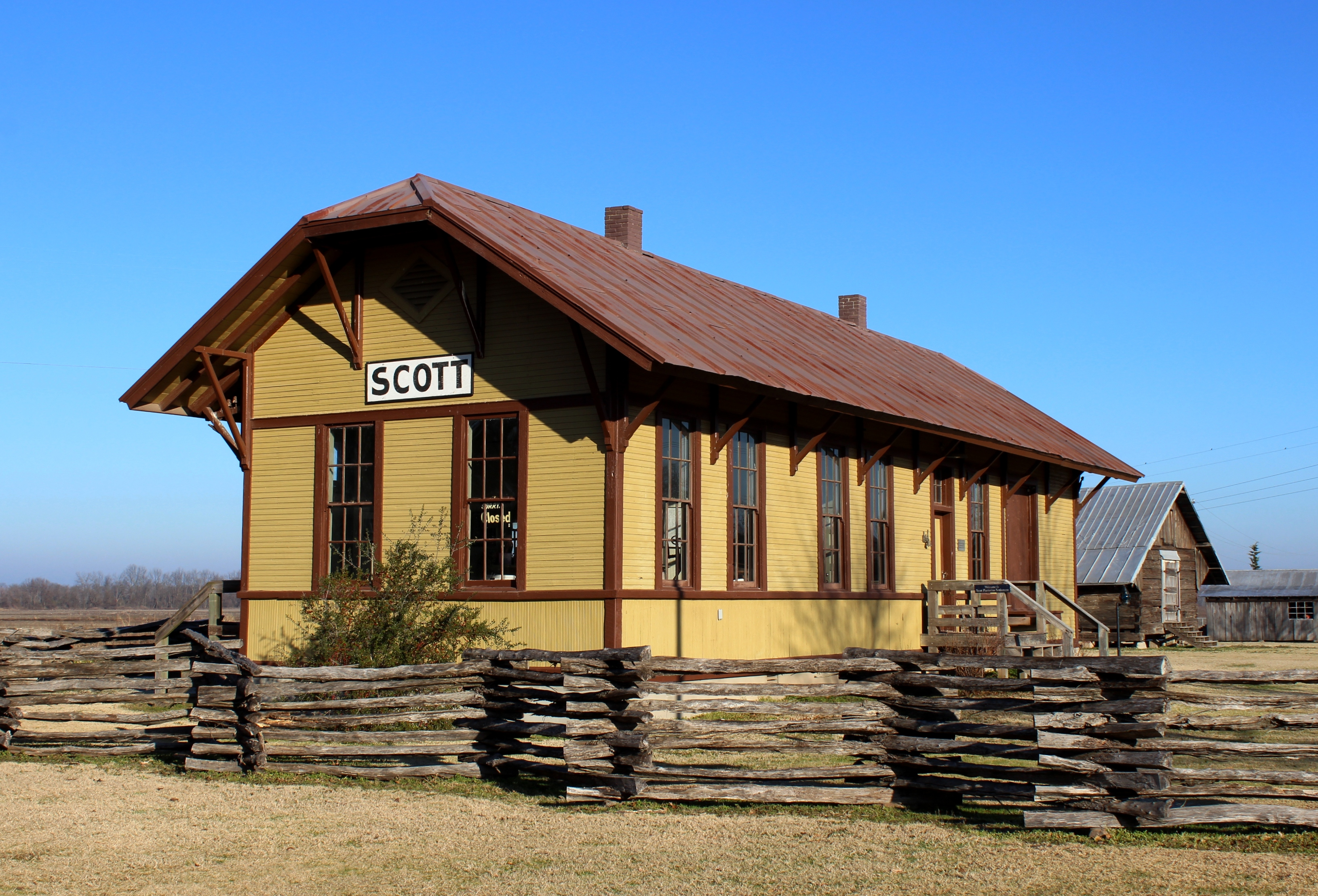
Cotton Belt Railroad Depot at Scott Plantation Settlement

The Arkansas Department of Parks Heritage & Tourism operates two facilities in the Scott area, one on the Pulaski County side and the other on the Lonoke County side, each with a focus on local history:

- Plantation Agriculture Museum, located on the Pulaski County side, displays artifacts from Arkansas's agricultural history in large farming operations, particularly cotton cultivation. The museum is housed in a circa-1912 general store building, and also features a restored 1912 cotton gin, Seed Warehouse #5, and chronicles the period from Arkansas's statehood to the end of World War II focusing on tenant farming and agricultural mechanization.
- Plum Bayou Mounds Archeological State Park, located on the Lonoke County side, focuses on the site of a Native American civilization that lived just east of present-day Scott nearly 1,000 years ago. Mounds at the park comprise one of the most significant remnants of Native American life in the state, and are listed on the National Register of Historic Places. The Arkansas Archeological Survey, part of the University of Arkansas system, maintains its Plum Bayou Research Station and laboratory in the park's visitor center.

Additionally, the history of Scott can be found at other sites around the community.

- Immediately northeast of Scott Charter School on the Pulaski County side is the Scott Plantation Settlement, a grouping of relocated buildings including the wooden Cotton Belt Railroad Depot that served Scott, collected to represent the area's plantation-era heritage (much in the same fashion as Little Rock's Historic Arkansas Museum).
- Marlsgate Plantation, also known as the Dortch Plantation, is the area's best known example of a plantation family home, constructed on the Lonoke County side. In 1885, William Pinkney Dortch married into the more influential Steele family. By 1904, Dortch had established a new plantation, centered around a mansion named Marlsgate built on Bearskin Lake, which was designed by architect Charles L. Thompson. It is a popular site for weddings and receptions today. It is listed in the National Register of Historic Places.
- Longbridge Plantation is an Estate home, also known as the Charles Alexander House, located on the Pulaski County side. It was designed by the Charles L. Thompson architectural firm for Charles Newton Alexander around 1906 on Hills Lake in Young Township, Scott, Arkansas, just east of Galloway, Arkansas along Highway 70. Alexander moved to Pulaski County in In 1879 at 21 years old. He began farming upon arrival and added to his original holdings, until he became one of the largest and most influential land owners in central Arkansas. Alexander was President of the Rose City Cotton Oil Mills, director in the Exchange National Bank of Little Rock Exchange Bank Building (Little Rock, Arkansas), and a director of the Arkansas Cotton Growers Association. He was also on the Highway Commission of Arkansas.
- James Robert Alexander, who had settled in the area in 1882, built Land's End Plantation (Scott, Arkansas) in 1925; its central house was designed by John Parks Almand. It is a 5,000-acre (2,000 ha) working plantation, located on the banks of the Arkansas River. The main plantation complex includes a 1925 Tudor Revival house, and more than 20 outbuildings. AR 161, which passes close to the main house, is lined by pecan trees planted about 1900 by Alexander. It is listed on the National Register of Historic Places since 1999.
- The All Souls Church (Scott, Arkansas) Interdenominational Chapel is an architectural gem from the turn of the twentieth century. It was designed by Charles L. Thompson and built by George Leifer. Conoway Scott donated land for a new church building, and Charles N. Alexander donated construction materials. The cornerstone was laid on June 27, 1906. The first service in All Souls Church was held on January 13, 1907, led by Methodist minister Forney Hutchinson. Situated along the county line, the church building is listed on the National Register of Historic Places, and has been in continuous use by the congregation since 1907.
- The Fred and Lucy Alexander Schaer House and Ashley-Alexander House (located in nearby Galloway, Arkansas), and The Cotham House located in Scott are historic homes located in the area with connections to historic local families.
- Prior to a fire that destroyed the structure in 2017, Cotham's Mercantile Store, a widely known community restaurant favored by former President Bill Clinton, and famous for its Hubcap Burgers and Mississippi Mud Pie, was housed in a former general store building constructed in 1912, and displayed multiple antique farm implements.

== Longbridge Plantation ==
Longbridge is an Estate home, also known as the Charles Alexander House, located on Hills Lake in Young Township, Scott, Arkansas, just east of Galloway, Arkansas along Highway 70.

=== History ===
Charles Newton Alexander Sr., prominent planter, industrialist, and banker built Longbridge in 1906 as the centerpiece of his sprawling postbellum Plantation. The house originally set on 2,500 acres. The plantations main products were cotton and livestock.

Alexander, born November 15, 1858, in Asheville NC, moved to Pulaski County in In 1879 at 21 years old. He began farming upon arrival and added to his original holdings, until he became one of the largest and most influential land owners in central Arkansas. Alexander was President of the Rose City Cotton Oil Mills, director in the Exchange National Bank of Little Rock, and a director of the Arkansas Cotton Growers Association. He was also on the Highway Commission of Arkansas.

=== Today ===
Today Longbridge Estate is an Opportunity farm for local farmers. The estate and home are still in the same family. The house has recently housed a ministry as well as an event company.

== Notable people ==
- Catherine Tharp Altvater lived in Scott for the last ten years of her life.
