= Plantation Agriculture Museum =

Economic history near Arkansas River

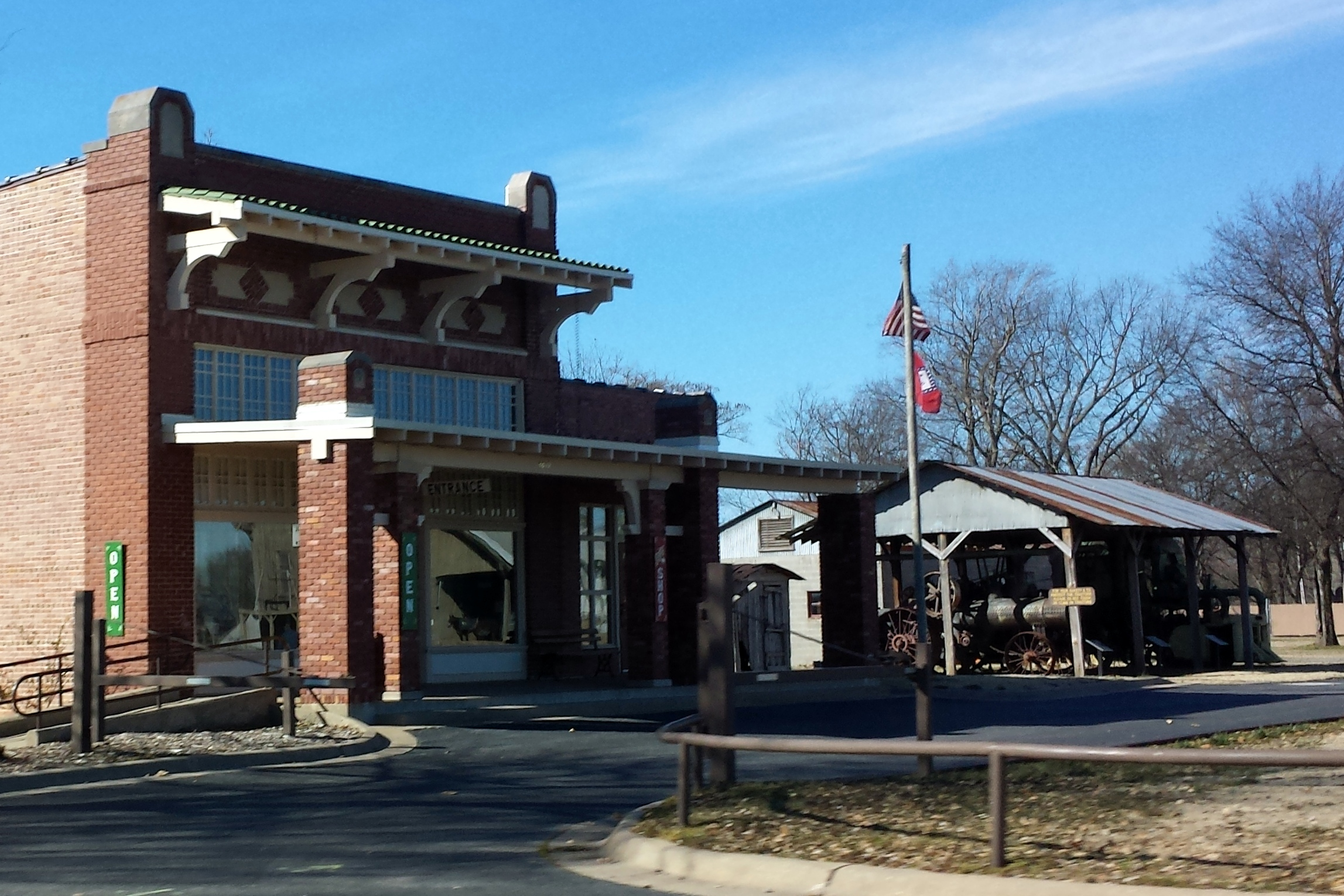
- Plantation Agriculture Museum

- Location in Arkansas Location in United States
- Established: 1985
- Location: 4815 AR Hwy 161 South; Scott, Arkansas; Pulaski, Lonoke
- Coordinates: 34°42′55″N 92°3′13″W
- Type: History museum
- Website: www.arkansasstateparks.com/parks/plantation-agriculture-museum

The Plantation Agriculture Museum in Scott, Arkansas, is a local museum showcasing the agricultural history of the area. Located near the Pulaski County and Lonoke County line, approximately 12 mi (19 km) east of Little Rock, Arkansas (Pulaski County), the museum park sits in the Arkansas River lowlands, near the north shore of Horseshoe Lake.

The General Store and Post Office buildings are constructed in the Prairie Style of architecture.

== History ==
The 1803 Louisiana Purchase added vast expanses of uncharted land west of the Mississippi River, attracting planters in search of new opportunities. Some of these settlers were drawn to the fertile lands along the Arkansas River in central Arkansas. The area now known as Scott was first settled in the mid-1800s, with Chester Ashley among its early founders. Conoway Scott Sr. arrived in the 1830s, eventually establishing several successful ventures, including a large plantation. Scott’s landholdings were later intersected by the St. Louis Railroad, also called the “Cotton Belt,” and “Scott’s Station” or “Scott’s Crossing” became a regular stop. Damaged signage at Scott’s Station eventually shortened the name to simply “Scott,” giving rise to the town's name.

By the early twentieth century, Scott had developed into a thriving community dominated by cotton plantations. As these plantations expanded, local merchants opened several general stores. One of the most notable structures, a large brick building constructed in 1912 by Conoway Scott Jr., served as a general store. Although he commissioned the store, Scott never operated it himself.

Over the years, the store was run by various proprietors, though the exact dates and ownership details remain unclear. The earliest known operators included Brown, or possibly Brown/Pearson. At one point, the store was known as the Steele-Dortch store. Later, the Foster family operated the establishment as Foster’s Store, which continued into the early 1960s. A post office was added to the northwest side of the building in 1929 and remained in use until a new post office was opened in the early 1960s.

In 1948, Robert L. Dortch, a prominent plantation owner and cotton seed breeder in Scott, Arkansas, built a Cotton Seed Warehouse to support his expanding seed business. His previous cotton seed warehouse #4 (built c. 1937) was inadequate for the volume of seed he intended for sale and planting. Dortch selected this new location for its convenient access to the highway and the Cotton Belt Railroad line, with a spur line running directly beside the warehouse. The warehouse design included an auger system and sloping sides to accommodate large piles of seed, incorporating improvements Dortch had developed from his experience with earlier warehouses.

== Plantation Museum ==
The general store remained in use until the 1960s. The building became the Plantation Museum in c. 1966. Dortch and his daughter Floride Dortch Rebsamen purchased the building and operated a museum documenting Arkansas's cotton farming life until Mr. Dortch’s death in 1972. The Plantation Museum featured most of the artifacts still in the museum’s collection. The collection was amassed by Mr. Dortch and Mrs. Rebsamen. Floride started a “key club” by which local people could drop off artifacts in the museum during Mrs. Rebsamen’s absences to Arizona. Plans for the "Plantation Museum" were impressive, including designs for a living history compound of more than 20 structures the Dortches believed illustrated an everyday Arkansas cotton plantation. Although those plans were never fully realized, the museum did grow to include thousands of artifacts ranging from blacksmith tools and kitchen appliances to a pair of huge steam traction engines and tractors.

=== Bearskin Lake Railroad ===
Dortch established the Scott and Bearskin Lake Railroad as a tourist railway as part of the Plantation Agriculture Museum near Scott, Arkansas, in the 1960s and after his death in 1978, his son closed it and began moving steam locomotives, rolling stock and trackage to the Victorian tourist destination Eureka Springs, Arkansas, and reopened it as the Eureka Springs and North Arkansas Railway.

== Plantation Agriculture Museum ==
On December 7, 1984, Jo Luck Wilson, Executive Director of the Arkansas Department of Parks & Tourism, Greg Butts and Bill Paxton from the Planning and Development Section met with Representative Bill Foster and the Dortch family Lawyer, John Edwards at the museum. A January 24, 1985 memo said. "The visit was made at the request of Representative William "Bill" Foster of District 71, son of the last owner of Fosters General Store. Representative Foster had previously suggested that the following resources could possibly be purchased by the state from Mr. Robert Dortch and be utilized as a museum administered by the Arkansas Department of Parks and Tourism." The memo goes on to describe the property as being two parcels of land that included the museum building and the cotton gin across the street from the museum, about five acres total. The memo notes, "A very large collection of farm machinery, tools and related agricultural equipment used in the Scott area during the first half of the 20th century." Mrs. Wilson added recommendations to the memo which indicated a plan to proceed with creating a museum from the property. She pointed out the need for financial strategies to be formed to support operations and salaries as well as capital outlay. She said that long range plans for growth needed to be formulated that would lead to accreditation by the American Museums Association. All of Mrs. Wilson's concerns were addressed in a master plan document created by Wesley Creel, the Division Director of Historical Resources and Museum Services and Representative Foster saw to the funding and resources needed to begin the museum. Representative Foster then convinced the Arkansas Legislature to approve funding for land and building acquisition and renovation.

The Arkansas Department of Parks and Tourism entered into negotiations with the Dortch Gin Company to acquire the Plantation Museum in 1985. The warranty deed was filed in Pulaski County on April 14, 1986, giving the museum to Arkansas State Parks for the sum of one dollar. When the museum was finally purchased, the Dortch family allowed the artifacts to remain in the building as a donation. Scores of large artifacts that were displayed outside were included. The state also acquired the Seed Warehouse #5 beside Highway 165. Personnel to begin operations at the museum were not hired until 1987. The years until 1989 were spent remodeling the building and storing the collections. All of the museum’s collections were moved into the Seed Warehouse #5 using inmate labor. It housed the collections until the museum structure was refurbished.

=== The Main Gallery and Post Office Gallery ===
Phase I construction was completed in summer 1989. On June 25, 1989, the museum was dedicated and a ribbon cutting was held. The Director of Arkansas State Parks, Richard Davies gave the welcome address. Speakers included Representative Doug Woods, Senator Max Howell, Representative W.F. "Bill" Foster and Jo Luck Wilson, Executive Director of the Arkansas Department of Parks, Heritage, and Tourism. Plantation Agriculture Museum's new mission was listed to “collect, preserve, record, and interpret the history of cotton agriculture. The museum opened with the post office wing only as exhibit space. The main gallery was used as office space and collection storage”. Phase II construction saw the completion of the main gallery and an expansion of exhibits. The exhibits were designed to show the processes of growing cotton "from the field to the gin," and included glimpses into plantation life with a kitchen and blacksmith exhibit. The second opening was officially held September 29, 1990. The MOF set aside for exhibits was a little over $5,000.00.

=== Collections Management Facility ===
The museum's collection management facility (CMF) was built in 1993 by J&D Construction Company. It houses the museum's collection of artifacts and is the conservation and exhibit construction area. The museum director, Ben Swadley, planned out the basic layout from other examples of collection facilities.

=== Dortch Cotton Gin ===
The idea for the cotton gin building had its inception in 1993 when one of the museum founders and charter Plantation Agriculture Advisory Commission members, J. William Bevis Sr., heard that the Dortch Family was clearing land near Bearskin Lake and needed to tear down the Dortch Gin. Bevis approached the owner, Polly Dortch, and requested that the ginning equipment be donated to the museum. The museum and Mr. Bevis acted swiftly to put together a crew of inmates from the Wrightsville unit of the Arkansas Department of Corrections to disassemble the Munger System ginning equipment and move it to the museum grounds. The structure could not be saved in the time the owner allowed the museum to salvage what it could from the Bearskin Lake property, but all of the equipment numbering in the hundreds of pieces were salvaged.

In February, 1999, a North Little Rock architecture firm owned by Gary Clements was contracted to research and draft biddable plans for the construction of the gin on the museum property in Scott. Clements & Associates Architects drafted blueprints and researched the configuration of the gin equipment. Clements’ Project Manager Chris Dimon, worked with Jim Watson of J.W. Equipment, Inc. from Chandler Arizona to identify each of the hundreds of pieces and draft blueprints of how the ginning equipment would piece together in the new structure. Parks & Tourism and the architect settled on a design that would be much like the original structure, yet accommodate tour groups and persons with disabilities. The gin structure construction bid was awarded to HYDCO Construction, North Little Rock on Tues, Oct. 29th 2002. HYDCO finished construction by April, 2003.

All the gin parts were transported to the museum and placed in storage until 2003, when Conservation Solutions Inc. (CSI) was hired to conserve and install the ginning equipment. CSI transported much of the equipment that needed specialized conservation to their studios in Washington DC. The conservation work was concluded on site and installation began. CSI subcontracted with Jim Watson of J.W. Equipment, Inc. from Chandler Arizona who had been in the business for over 30 years and knew the layout and details of older ginning systems. Conservators and technicians remained on site to blend in the look of new components, such as ductwork missing from the original. The conservation team also had to supervise the installation and treatment of some artifacts in the gin building.

The project was completed in 2003. Exhibit funding from ANCRC remained until 2007, when the museum and Arkansas State Parks Exhibit shop added the final interpretive panels to the structure and wayside.

=== Seed Warehouse #5 ===
Seed warehouse No. 5 was acquired by the Arkansas Dept. of Parks and Tourism in 1985 as part of the Plantation Agriculture Museum site. The first professional assessment of the warehouse was submitted on May 21, 2003, by Roy Eugene Graham during an on site visit to Seed Warehouse #5 at Plantation Agriculture Museum. On his visit, Graham consulted with Gaskin, Hill & Norcross Architect Richard Taylor, museum staff and planners about the warehouse stabilization plan. He also made recommendations about the structure’s preservation and conservation for long term care and development.

Working for Gaskin, Hill & Norcross, architect Richard Taylor developed stabilization plans and a historic structures report, completing architectural plans for restoration. In March, 2004 the historic structure report was completed and architectural plans soon followed. Tim Heiple with Heiple + Wiedower Architects PLLC worked on the restoration of the Interior from 2004-2006 as the design professional.

Through fall 2003 and spring 2004, the museum negotiated for and hired a united coalition of exhibit firms to develop an exhibit proposal and plans for Seed Warehouse #5. UJMN took care of the architectural concerns, LaPaglia handled the script and Explus worked with the museum on exhibit drawings and plans. The museum staff wrote most of the exhibit text and the exhibit firm turned them into text panels. Most of the work was completed by April, 2005. Explus will begin working on exhibit fabrication in 2007-2008. In December 2005, RBD Construction Company of Pine Bluff, Arkansas began stabilization of the warehouse. They replaced all rotten wood in the structure with custom milled lumber. Extensive work was done to the floor beams. Windows received repair and/or replacement. The roof lathing was laminated with new wood and the outside was coated with elastic paint and sealed. All loose tin was screwed in place and the docking bays were repaired. The project also included repainting the letter graphics on the north facing roof. RBD finished the project in August, 2006. In November, 2006, Conservation Solutions Incorporated (CSI) performed an assessment on the mechanical parts of the seed warehouse that involved the seed moving and cleaning equipment. Between November 17 and 22, 2008, Explus began to fabricate and install the exhibits in Seed Warehouse No. 5. The exhibits were completed and a grand opening was held May 9, 2009. The museum staff and exhibit firm had been working on hand rail layouts, graphics, text and other exhibit details from November 2007 until October 2008. The museum staff selected all the images and wrote the text.

=== 1960s Post office and Heritage Resource Center ===
The museum purchased the former Scott Post Office from Mr. Claude Westphale in 2003. It included an acre of land, more or less and the structure. The building has been adapted to be used for educational programs and workshops, as well as a meeting area and rentable space. It was renamed to the Heritage Resource Center.

=== Historic Tractor Exhibit ===
The historic tractor exhibit was built as a covered outdoor pavilion down the park's private lane from the museum. It displays vintage tractors, cotton pickers, harvesters, and a hay baler. These machines serve as examples of the early mechanization that changed farming practices and the way of life in small farming communities across Arkansas around the period of World War II.

=== The Alexander Building Collection ===
The Virginia Alexander family offered to donate three tenant houses representing different architectural styles, a blacksmith shop, a cotton pen, a hand-hewn cypress corncrib, the 1840s Ashley-Alexander dogtrot cabin, a medical clinic, an outhouse, a smoke house, the original W. P. Dortch, Sr. plantation “big house,” and a wash house to the Plantation Agriculture Museum in 1994. When the museum declined the offer, Alexander donated more than eight acres to provide space for the relocation of “working buildings,” and her daughter, Joan Dietz, received enthusiastic support from other plantation owners who donated buildings for placement at the Scott Plantation Settlement. in 1995.

== Today ==
Today the museum has more than 10,000 artifacts. Exhibits take visitors “from the field to the gin,” explaining how cotton was grown and harvested in the pre-mechanized era. The life and culture of people from sharecroppers and tenant farmers to plantation owners are preserved and explored in the museum’s diverse exhibits.

The Plantation Agriculture Museum not only covers the agricultural history but also explores labor and nonagricultural aspects of a plantation. The exhibits and programs help to emphasize how plantations were self-supporting and held a wide variety of jobs for their workers. Plantations required a large labor force which began with sharecroppers and tenant farmers replacing slavery after the Civil War, while the number of cotton plantations continued to grow and become more profitable. In Arkansas, cotton was grown more than any other cash crop and it was a powerful element of the economy and was the center of many people’s lives and livelihood. The sharecropper system and way cotton was grown changed very little from early sharecropper to sharecroppers / tenant farmers of the 1920’s and 1930’s. In Arkansas, there were a large number of both black and white sharecroppers. Laborers prepared, fertilized, planted, and cultivated the fields with animal-drawn implements and workers picked cotton by hand.

Appearing at the turn-of-the-century tractors did not outnumber draft animals until World War II. Planters were then forced to mechanize due to changing in economics and shortages of laborers and mules, which were in demand for the war effort. As the tractors become more popular, sharecropper and tenant farmers invented the phase “tractored off” for being push out of their jobs. The tractor could work the land with less people and less time one man, using a tractor could do the work of 20 men with mules. Tractors illustrate the end of the planting age of cotton agriculture in the early 1940’s and the beginning of the modern system of machine farming.

=== Park Grounds ===
The museum is housed in a series of buildings, including the 1912 Mercantile building (the main museum gallery and museum store), the 1929 Post Office (the temporary gallery and restrooms). The Post Office Gallery hosts annual Spring and Fall temporary exhibits. The museum's permanent exhibits and programs interpret the history of cotton and rural agriculture in Arkansas from the end of the Civil War through World War II with a mission to "...collect, preserve, record and interpret the history of cotton agriculture." The museum's staff offers a variety of interpretive programs.

A walk outside guides visitors to a set of historic cotton pens and the museum's interpretive cotton patch, then to the 1916 Dortch Gin Exhibit building that features a 1920s two-stand Munger cotton gin and cotton press that has been authentically preserved and assembled in its original configuration by ginning experts.

Dortch's 1943, 10,000 sq. ft. Seed Warehouse No. 5 is listed on the National Register of Historic Places. It was used to store and distribute the cotton, soybean, and rice seeds he developed. The building is now an open exhibit space easily accessible to the public.

Other outside exhibits include farm implements and the Historic Tractor Exhibit which houses five rare antique tractors and cultivators, three mechanical cotton pickers, two steam traction engines, and one cotton/hay bailer.

=== Harper's Loop and Tour de Rock Cyclist Stop ===
The museum is located along the Harper's Loop Cyclist Bike Trail. Harper's Loop is a 37-mile bike trail in North Little Rock, Arkansas. The trail starts at the Arkansas Inland Maritime Museum submarine and follows the signs for Harper’s Loop along the Arkansas River Trail to Hwy 161. From there it travels a few miles south, enjoying a beautiful stretch of riding under the shade of century-old pecan trees. The trail then travels approximately eight miles east on Hwy. 232 (Walter Estes Road) to Keo, Arkansas, before turning north on Hwy. 165 to Scott.

Some stops along 165 include Plum Bayou Mounds Archeological State Park, a National Historic Landmark that preserves Native American mounds and is one of the archeological sites in the lower Mississippi River Valley, and Plantation Agriculture Museum State Park. It's a route for cycling groups. The trail is a flat out-and-back that breezes by some of the state’s finest farmland, with rows and rows of cotton, corn, rice and soybeans, passing through the Western Arkansas Delta and Arkansas Grand Prairie region.

The museum is also a popular rest stop on the annual Major Taylor 111 at the Port, Wampoo Roadeo, and Tour de Rock bicycle race. Tour de Rock's mission is to fight cancer and help CARTI deliver advanced cancer care. It is one of Arkansas’ largest cycling events and attracts cyclists from all over the southern region to ride pancake-flat 25, 50, 62, and 100-mile routes through Central Arkansas. Tour de Rock is a well-supported ride with multiple rest stops and special events.

The Arkansas Antique Tractor and Engine Show began in 1992 under the name Antique Power Days. It is held the weekend after Labor Day each year. The name was changed in 2000 to be more descriptive of the nature of the event. The event is a show that features antique tractors and engines for the public to see running and on exhibit on the museum grounds.

The Historic Holiday Open House/ Merry Maker's Craft Day is a holiday program held every December in the Main Gallery of the museum. Activities include making period crafts (including holiday ornaments, gifts and, décor), decorating graham cracker houses, Annual Plantation Prize Pecan Pie Competition, sipping hot cocoa or wassail, and enjoying holiday treats.

Spring Exhibit Opening is an event centered around the opening of the year's larger temporary exhibit. An opening ceremony and reception is included.
