= Cotham's Mercantile Store =

Coordinates: 34.69115°N 92.09644°W

Cotham's Mercantile Store was a widely known community restaurant in Scott, Arkansas, favored by former President Bill Clinton. It was housed in a former general store building constructed in 1912. A restaurant opened inside the store in 1984 and displayed multiple antique farm implements. Known for its large “hubcap” burgers, catfish, Mississippi Mud pie, and other southern comfort food, it has been visited by well-known politicians and celebrities.

== History ==
Cotham's mercantile was built in 1912. It served as a place where farmers and plantation owners could buy supplies. It also served for a time as a military commissary and a jail for criminals awaiting trial by a circuit-riding judge.

The store in Scott was built on stilts projecting over the edge of a bayou on Horseshoe Lake. Though Cotham's did not serve food at the time, the interior and exterior of the building were featured in the 1973 Burt Reynolds movie "White Lightning".

== Today ==
A fire destroyed the structure in 2017, and the structure was never rebuilt. The restaurant relocated to downtown Little Rock, Arkansas in a location known as Cotham's in the city.
