= List of highways numbered 70A =

The following highways are numbered 70A:

== United States ==
- U.S. Route 70A
- Illinois Route 70A (former)
- Maryland Route 70A
- Nebraska Spur 70A
- New York State Route 70A (former)
  - County Route 70A (Oneida County, New York)
  - County Route 70A (Steuben County, New York)
- Oklahoma State Highway 70A
