= Fred and Lucy Alexander Schaer House =

Historic house in Arkansas, United States

- Alexander-Schaer House
- U.S. National Register of Historic Places
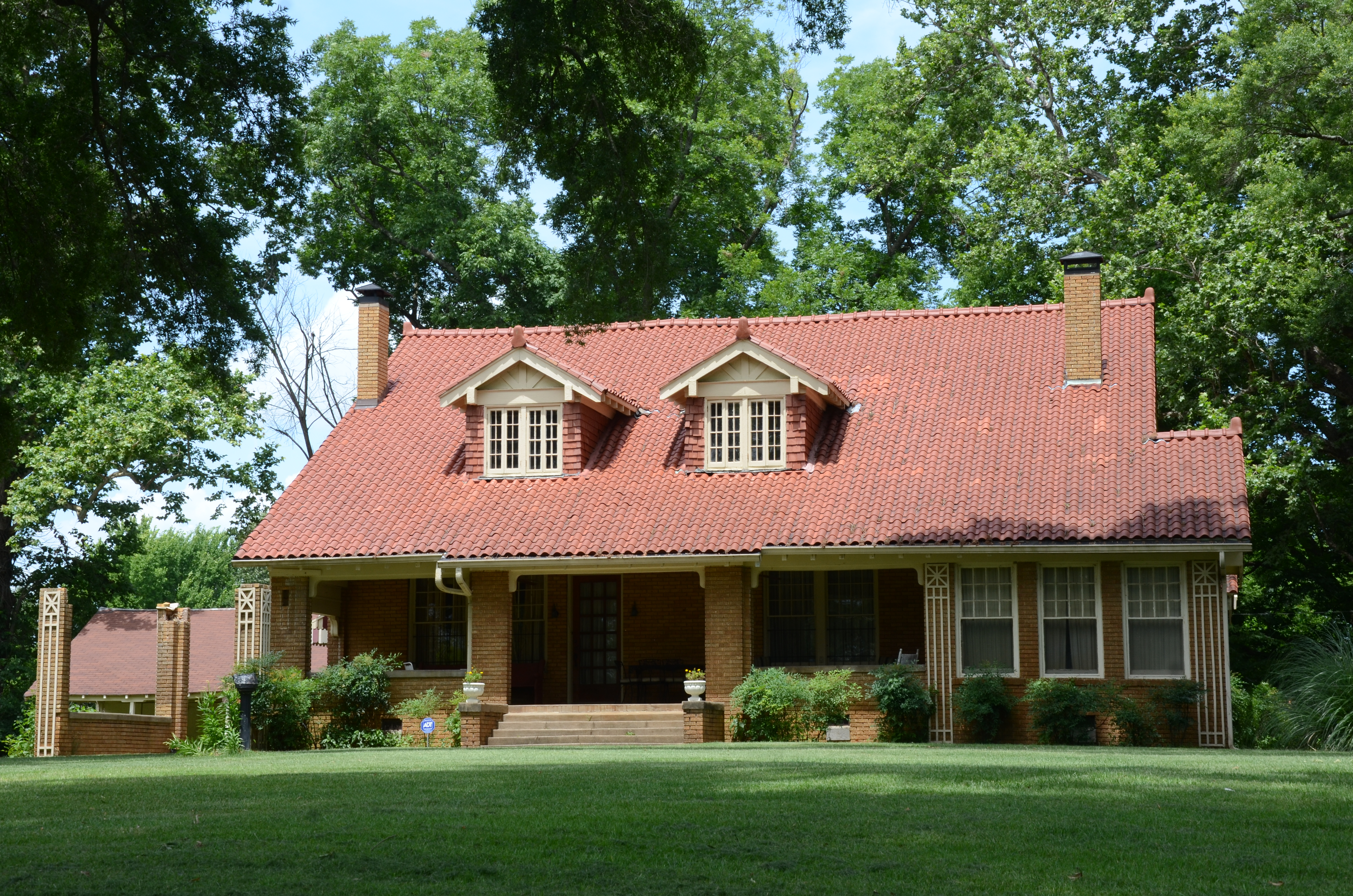

- Location within Arkansas Location within the United States
- Location: 13219 US 70, Galloway, Arkansas
- Coordinates: 34°46′25″N 92°7′7″W
- Area: 8.1 acres (3.3 ha)
- Built: 1920
- Architect: Charles L. Thompson or John Parks Almand
- Architectural style: Mission/spanish Revival, Bungalow/craftsman
- NRHP reference No.: 07000993
- Added to NRHP: September 27, 2007

The Alexander-Schaer House is a historic house at 13219 United States Route 70, a short way east of Galloway, Arkansas. It is a two-story frame structure, with a gabled tile roof and brick veneer exterior. Built in 1920, it is a fine example of Mission/Spanish Revival architecture, with the tile roof, brick exterior, and decorative ironwork elements all hallmarks of the style. The house is shaded by ancient oaks and a pecan grove overlooking the cypress waters of Hill Lake. The house's design has been attributed to both John Parks Almand (who did work for Lucy Alexander Schaer's family) or Charles L. Thompson, who did work for other members of the Schaer family.

The Alexander Schaer House has effectively been an event space since 1920 by the original owners, Fred and Lucy Alexander-Schaer, a Little Rock socialite. The Schaer House was listed on the National Register of Historic Places in 2007.

== See also ==
- National Register of Historic Places listings in Pulaski County, Arkansas
