= Nevada State Route 70 =

Two highways in the U.S. state of Nevada have been signed as Route 70:

- Nevada State Route 70 (1940s)
- Nevada State Route 70 (1960s), which existed until the 1970s renumbering
