= Autovía A-70 =

Motorway in Spain

Autovía A-70
- Alicante ring road
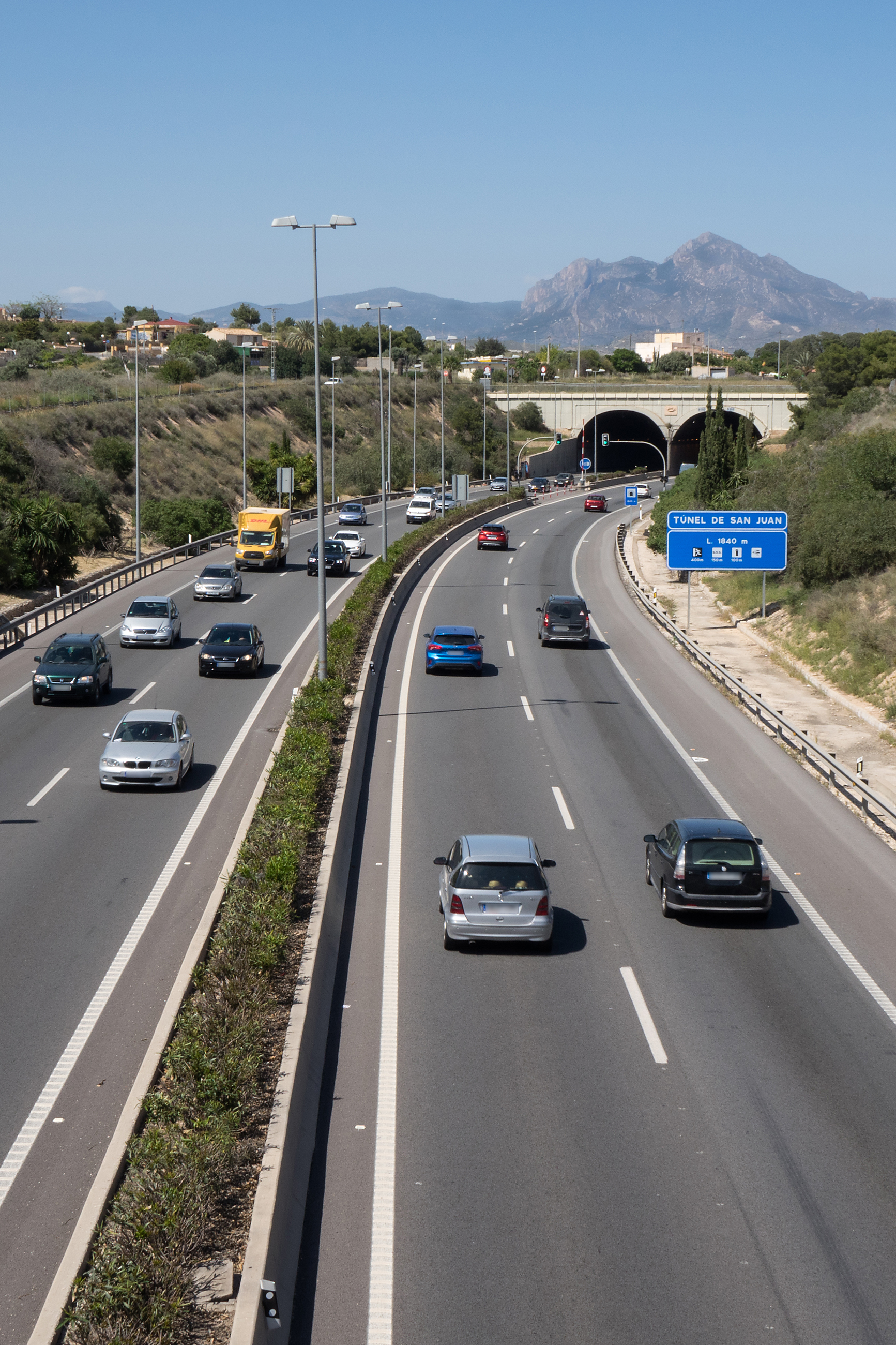
- A-70 highway and San Juan's tunnels

Route information
- Part of
- Length: 31 km (19 mi)

Major junctions
- From: El Campello
- J13 →Autovía A-77 J17 →Autovía A-31 J22 →Airport J30 →Elche
- To: Elche

Location
- Country: Spain

Highway system
- Highways in Spain; Autopistas and autovías; National Roads

The Autovía A-70 is one of two beltways of Alicante, Spain. Specifically, it is the nearest beltway to the city and is a toll-free highway. Its length is about 31 km.

The A-70 begins at El Campello and ends at Elche, passing near Muchamiel, Alicante and San Vicente del Raspeig. The route belongs to the Spanish Ministry of Transport, Mobility and Urban Agenda.
