= Scott Plantation Settlement =

Private historical park in Arkansas, US

- Location in Arkansas Location in United States
- Established: 1995
- Location: 15525 Alexander Rd; Scott, Arkansas; Pulaski, Lonoke
- Coordinates: 34°42′55″N 92°3′13″W
- Type: Historical Park
- Website: https://www.https://scottsettlement.com

The Scott Plantation Settlement is a private non-profit historical park located in Scott, Arkansas, on the Pulaski County and Lonoke County line, approximately twelve miles east of Little Rock, Arkansas, United States.

== History ==
The original owner of the land it sits on was Chester Ashley, a U.S. Senator. He was one of the first settlers to the area of Scott.

The land was gifted for the site creation by Virginia Alexander, and her daughter, Joan Dietz, is credited with the early organizing of the settlement park.

The dogtrot log house on at the settlement is believed to be the second oldest still existing in the state, built in 1840 by Ashley.

== Today ==
The park depicts early farming life from pre-statehood through early modern mechanization.
