= Dortch Plantation =

Historic house in Arkansas, United States

- Marlsgate Plantation
- U.S. National Register of Historic Places
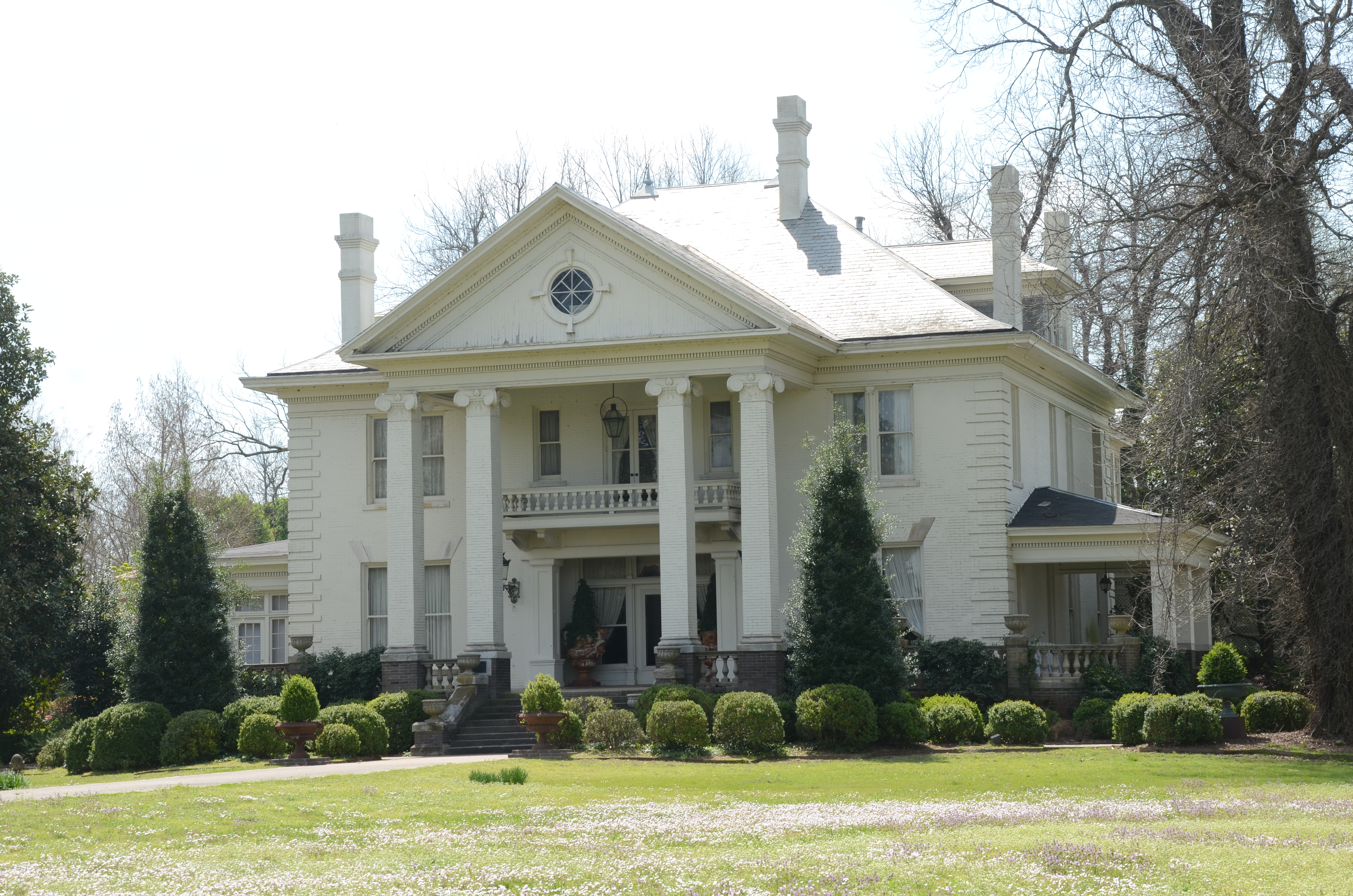

- Location within Arkansas Location within the United States
- Nearest city: Scott, Arkansas
- Coordinates: 34°42′55″N 92°3′13″W
- Area: 975 acres (395 ha) (listed portion of plantation)
- Built: 1904 (original); 1880 (increase)
- Architect: Charles L. Thompson (original)
- NRHP reference No.: 75000397 and 79003777 (original); 79003777 (increase)

Significant dates
- Added to NRHP: December 6, 1975 (original); March 21, 1979 (increase)
- Boundary increase: March 21, 1979

The Dortch Plantation, also known as the William P. Dortch House or the Marlsgate Plantation, is an historic house near Scott, Arkansas. Dortch House is the only plantation home in Arkansas that is fully furnished in the antebellum period style and available for tours and private events.

The house and parts of the plantation were listed on the National Register of Historic Places in 1975. The NRHP listing was increased in 1979 to cover additional building(s) dating from 1888.

== History ==
The original plantation property, totaling 1,600 acres, was a wedding gift to Mr. and Mrs. Dortch by Mrs. Dortch's parents, Thomas and Elizabeth Steele. The first house on the Dortch Plantation was built by the Dortches in 1888.

The Dortch Planation eventually expanded to over 7,000 acres with cotton, rice, corn and soy beans under cultivation. Upon the death of her husband Mrs. Dortch divided the property equally among her five sons.

== Dortch Family ==
The Dortch family was originally from North Carolina. Their westward movement began in 1838 when Willis Reeves Dortch first moved to Williamson County, Tennessee, where married Elizabeth Womack Stone and began his slave-based farm. The couple had three children. After the death of Willis Reeves Dortch in 1858, his wife and children moved to Lonoke County, Arkansas. William P. Dortch was 12 years old at this time. Eventually, William would enlist in the Confederate army, serving in Anderson's Battalion in Little Rock, Arkansas. Post-Civil War, he attended Miami University in Ohio and married Alice Orr, before returning to Arkansas. His only son, Frederick W. Dortch, was born before his wife's death in 1874. On January 15, 1885, widower William married Nettie Steele, daughter of Pulaski County's largest landowner, Thomas William Steele. As a wedding gift to his daughter, Mr. Steele gifted an 1,800-acre plantation adjoining the existing Dortch property. The newlyweds moved into their new home and had five sons by 1895. By 1922, the Dortch family and their farming prowess was known well enough to be featured in an article in the Arkansas Democrat issue published on September 10, 1922. The home stayed within the Dortch family for over 100 years.

== Dortch House ==
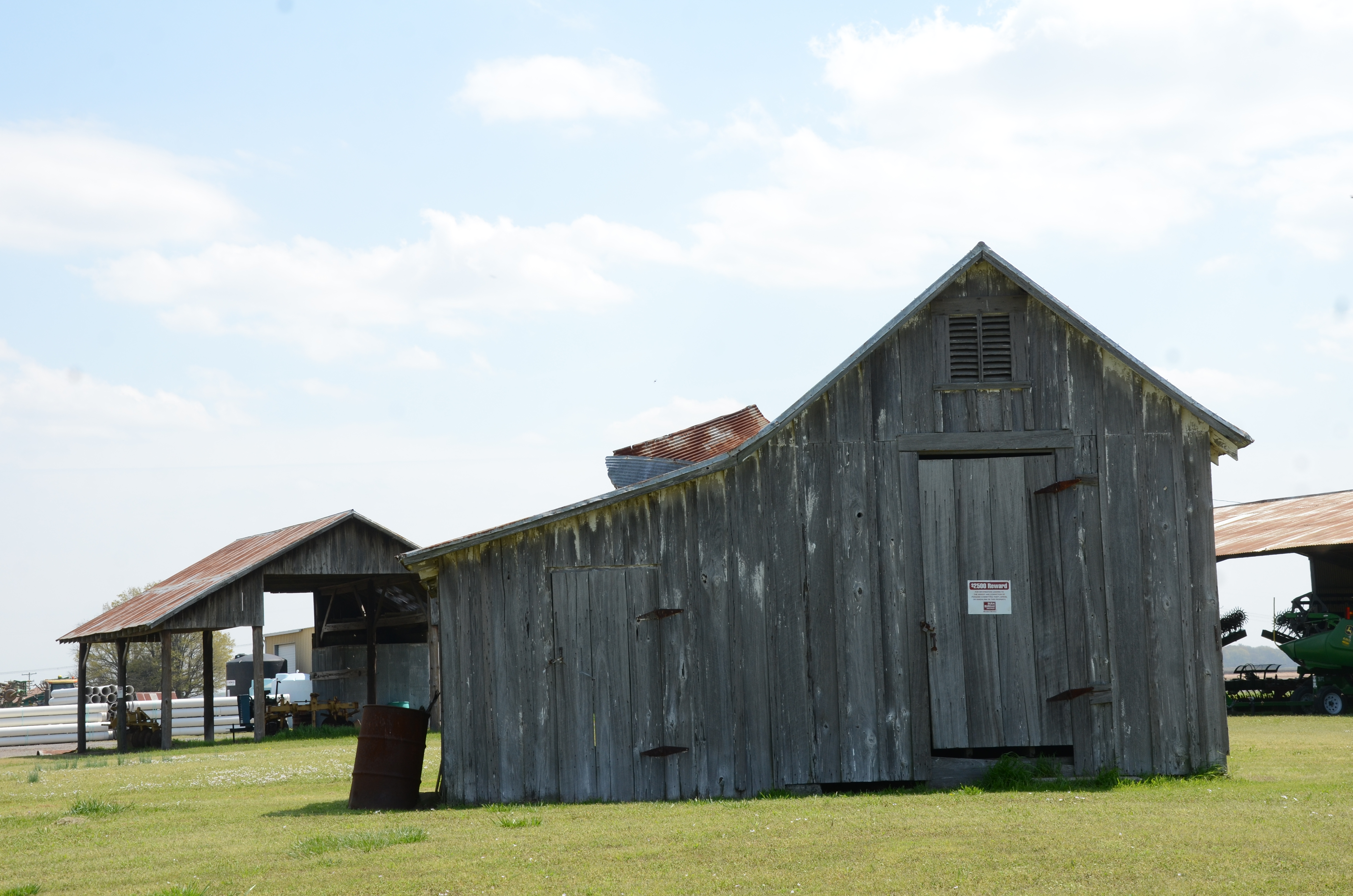
Barn at Dortch Plantation with modern farming implements in the background

Built in 1904, the Dortch House was designed by Arkansas architect Charles L. Thompson. It was described as one of the finest private residences in Arkansas. The Dortch House has a Neoclassical, Greek Revival design. It features 30 rooms in a total of eleven thousand square feet of living space.

On the front portico facing Bearskin Lake, doric columns rise over forty feet in height. The interior features a dramatic double staircase, original beveled glass windows, sliding oak pocket doors, handcrafted woodwork and Carrara marble fireplaces.

== Plantation gardens and other buildings ==
The Dortch plantation complex includes four distinct gardens designed by the Arkansas garden designer P. Allen Smith. Several outbuildings date to the original 1888 farmstead including the carriage house, a well house, a smoke house, stable house, and a pole barn, all of which are included in the National Register designation. The guest house at Dortch is modeled on Farmington Historic Home built in Louisville, Kentucky in 1812 and designed by Thomas Jefferson.

== Bearskin lake ==
The Dortch plantation is situated on Bearskin Lake, an oxbow lake that was originally a channel of the Arkansas River. Located along the Mississippi Flyway, the lake wildlife habitat features a broad range of wildlife including migratory waterfowl, a nesting pair of bald eagles and freshwater fish.

The banks of Bearskin Lake also served as an camping ground for Arkansas' Native American cultures, most notably the Plum Bayou Culture (A.D. 650 to 1050) known for constructing Toltec Mounds near Scott. Artifacts collected from the surface of Native American sites by the Dortch and Burrow family members were donated to the Toltec museum in the 1970s and are on display there.

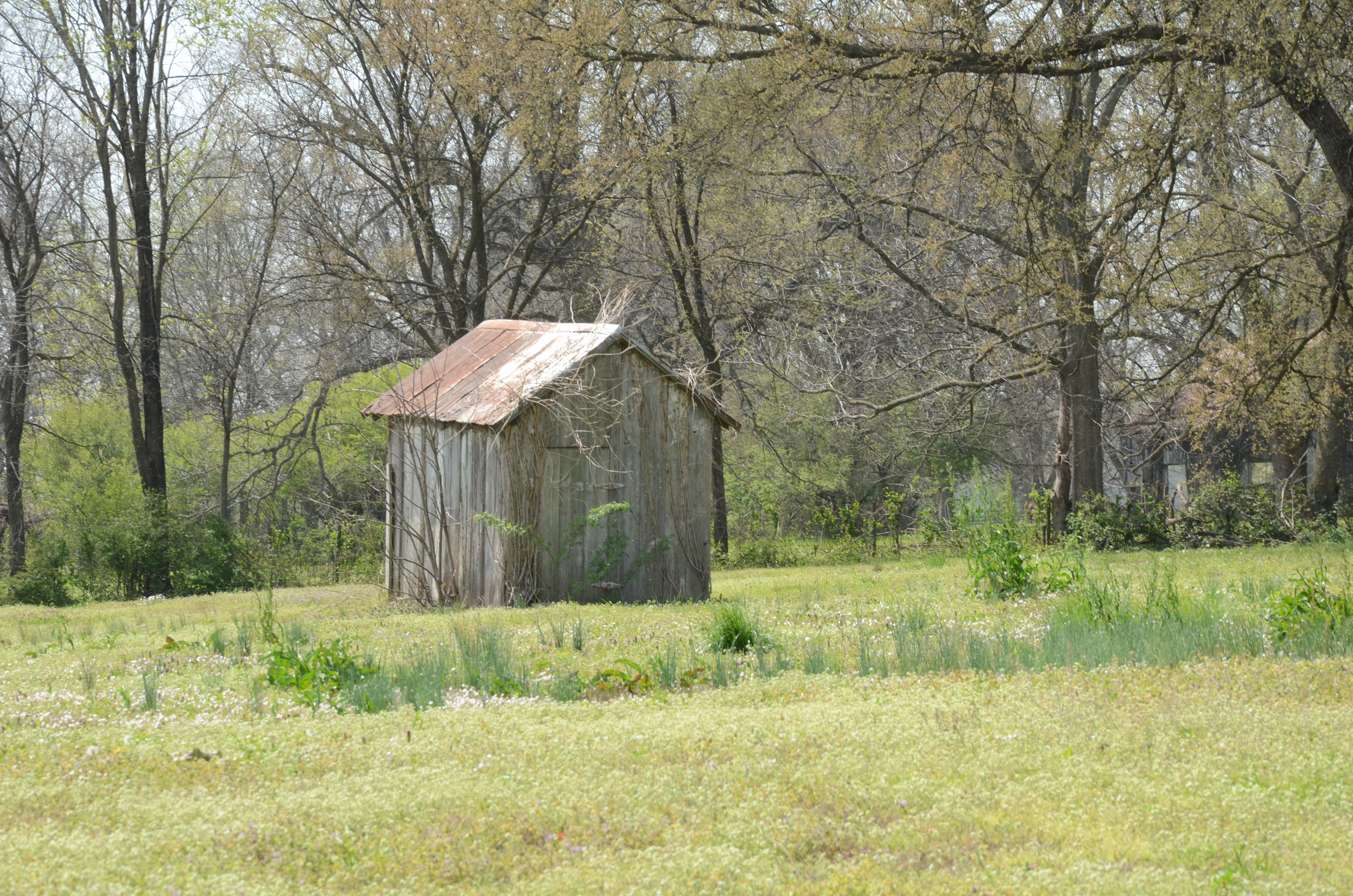
Small shed at Dortch Plantation

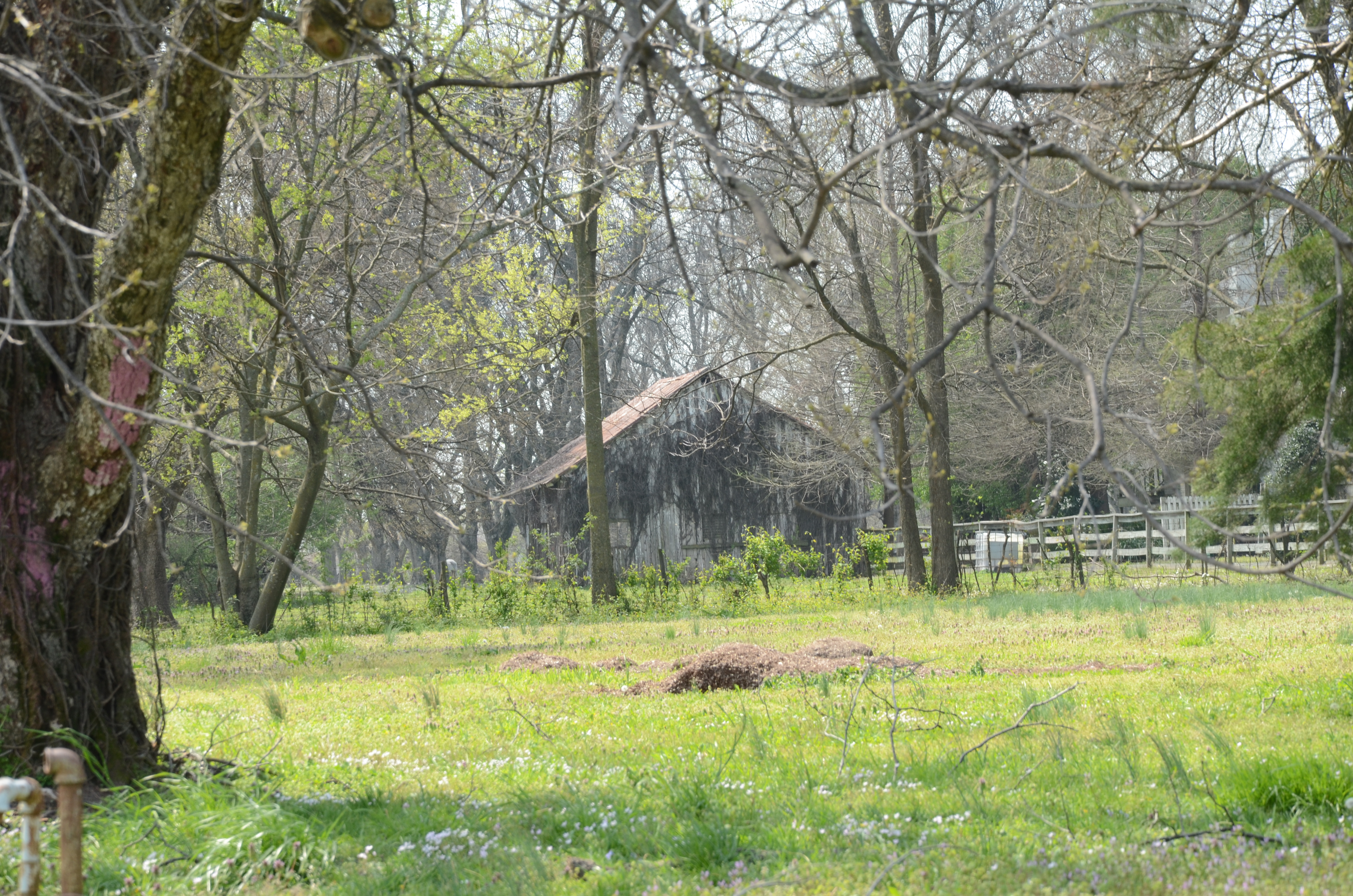
Outbuilding at Dortch Plantation

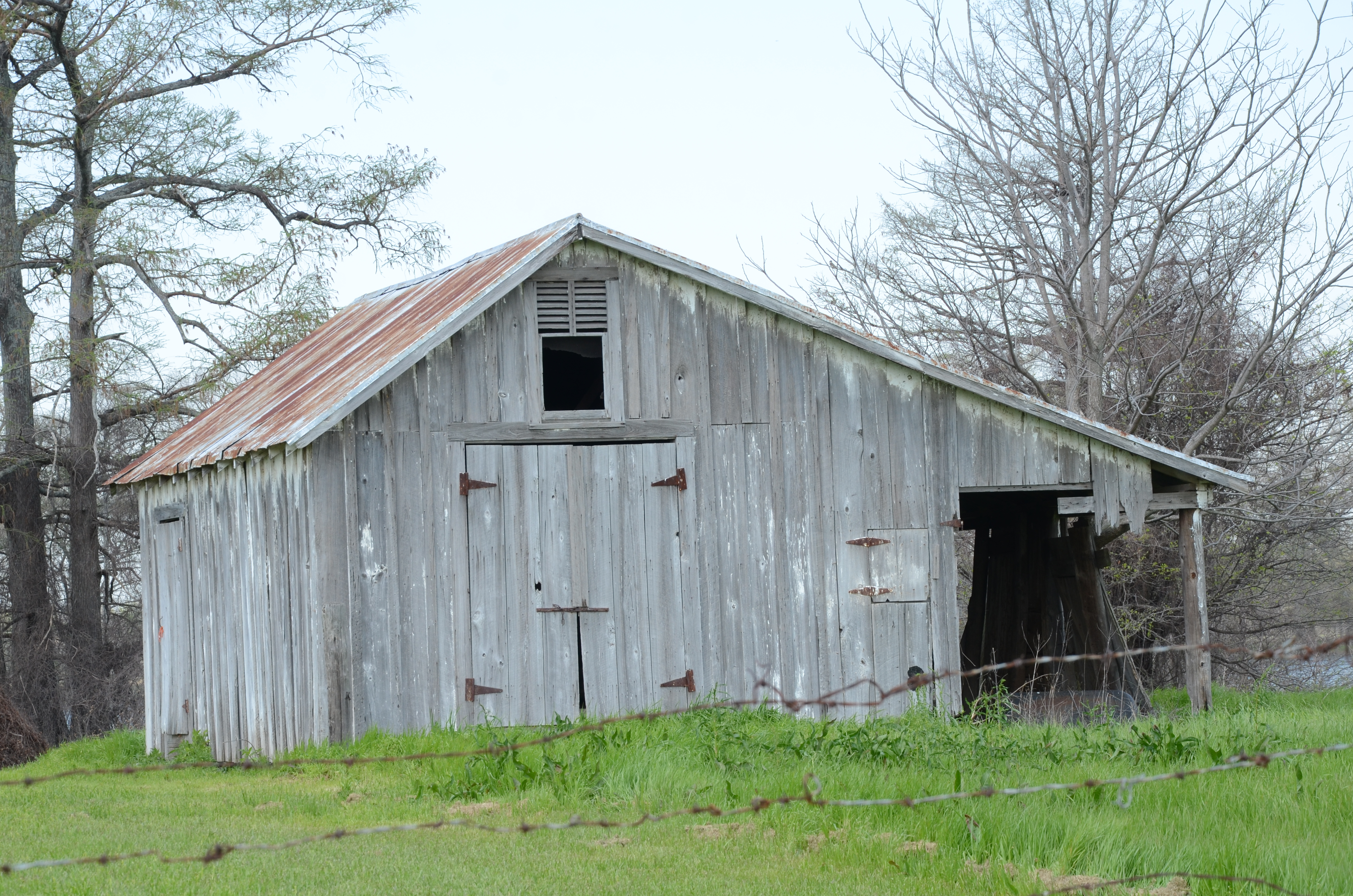
Barn at Dortch Plantation

== See also ==
- National Register of Historic Places listings in Lonoke County, Arkansas
