= Arkansas Highway 161 =

Designation for two state highways in Central Arkansas

Highway 161

Route information
- Maintained by ArDOT

Section 1
- Length: 5.9 mi (9.5 km)
- South end: I-440 / Jacksonville Highway in Jacksonville
- North end: I-57 / US 67 / US 167 / Vandenberg Boulevard in Jacksonville

Section 2
- Length: 19.80 mi (31.87 km)
- South end: US 165 in England
- North end: US 165 at Scott

Location
- Country: United States
- State: Arkansas
- Counties: Pulaski, Lonoke

Highway system
- Arkansas Highway System; Interstate; US; State; Business; Spurs; Suffixed; Scenic; Heritage
← AR 160	→ AR 162

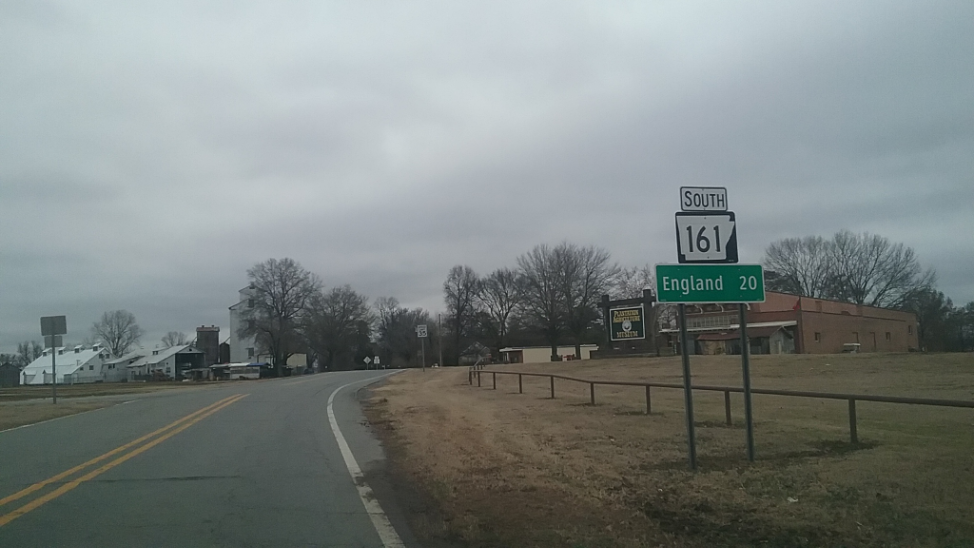
Highway 161 runs through Scott

Arkansas Highway 161 (AR 161) is a designation for two state highways in Central Arkansas. Both routes are maintained by the Arkansas Department of Transportation (ArDOT).

== Route descriptions ==
One route of 5.9 miles (9.5 km) runs north from the Jacksonville city limits near Interstate 440 (I-440) to I-57 near the Little Rock Air Force Base. A second route of 19.80 miles (31.87 km) begins at U.S. Route 165 (US 165) in England and runs north to terminate at US 165 at Scott.

== History ==
The 1959 Arkansas General Assembly passed and Governor Orval Faubus signed, Act 298, entitled "An Act to Remove a Part of State Highway 161 from the State Highway System" into law; removing a portion of Highway 161 between Faulkner Lake Rd and Highway 130 (present-day U.S. Route 165) from the state highway system. The rationale behind this legislation is not recorded in the minutes of the Arkansas State Highway Commission (ASHC) meeting, but the ASHC concurred with the General Assembly and removed the highway segment from the system on May 13, 1959.

The section between Prothro Junction and Jacksonville was formerly designated as US 67E. The route became Highway 161 on August 31, 1960 upon completion of the new US 67 alignment between Little Rock and Jacksonville. The ASHC closed a gap of 7.99 miles (12.86 km) along the Lonoke County segment of Highway 161 on December 13, 1972. A segment between Cabot and El Paso was redesignated as Highway 5 on June 24, 1970.

The Arkansas State Highway Commission marked the segment between US 70 and the Jacksonville city limits for removal from the state highway system on December 9, 2021 following construction of a pavement improvement project along the route. The deletion was part of a deal with the cities of Little Rock, North Little Rock, and Pulaski County to cover the relocation costs for Rock Region Metro as part of the "30 Crossing" project on I-30.

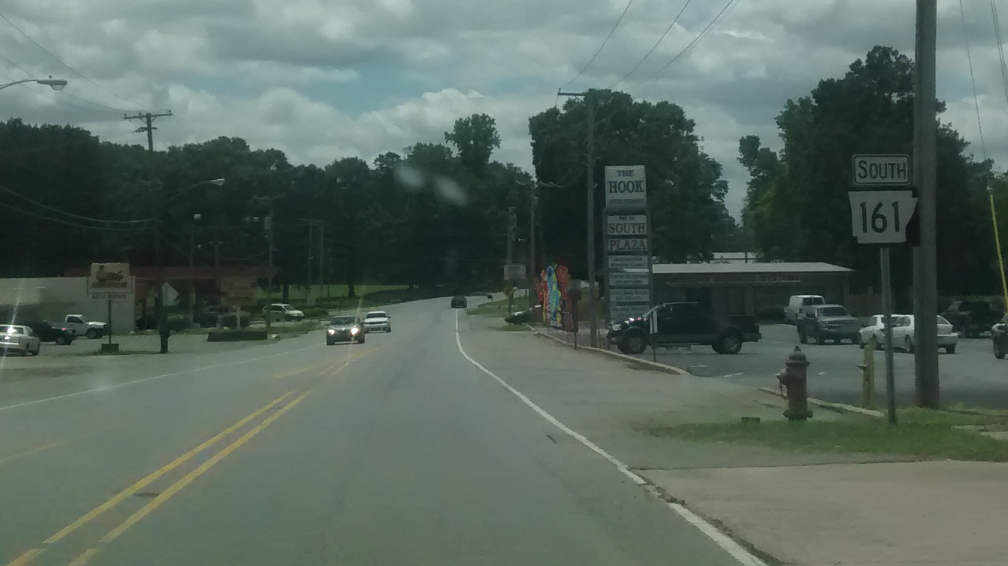
Highway 161 in Jacksonville

== Major intersections ==
County	Location	mi	km	Destinations	Notes
Pulaski	Jacksonville	0.0	0.0	Jacksonville Highway	Continuation south
Pulaski	Jacksonville	0.2	0.32	I-440 – Jacksonville, Texarkana	Exit 12 on I-440
Pulaski	Jacksonville	3.0	4.8	AR 294 east – Furlow	Western terminus of AR 294
Pulaski	Jacksonville	5.8	9.3	I-57 / US 67 / US 167 – Little Rock, Jacksonville, Searcy	Exit 11 on I-57
Pulaski	Jacksonville	5.9	9.5	Vandenberg Boulevard	Continuation west
Gap in route
Lonoke	England	0.00	0.00	US 165	Southern terminus
Lonoke	Scott	19.71	31.72	US 165 – Little Rock, Keo	Northern terminus
1.000 mi = 1.609 km; 1.000 km = 0.621 mi
