= Immaculate Heart of Mary (disambiguation) =

Immaculate Heart of Mary is a Roman Catholic devotional name used to refer to the Catholic view of the interior life of Mary, mother of Jesus

Immaculate Heart of Mary, or Sacred Heart of Mary, or variations may refer to:

== Churches ==
=== India ===
- Immaculate Heart Church, Karnal, a church under Roman Catholic Diocese of Simla and Chandigarh
- Immaculate Heart of Mary Cathedral, Kottayam, Kerala

=== United States ===
- Immaculate Heart of Mary (Phoenix, Arizona), listed on the NRHP in Maricopa County, Arizona
- Immaculate Heart of Mary Church (North Little Rock, Arkansas), listed on the NRHP in Pulaski County, Arkansas
- Immaculate Heart of Mary (Los Angeles, California)
- Immaculate Heart of Mary Church (Danbury, Connecticut)
- Immaculate Heart of Mary Catholic Church in Papaikou, Papaikou, Hawaii
- Immaculate Heart of Mary Church (Chicago), Illinois
- Immaculate Heart of Mary Catholic Church (Windthorst, Kansas), listed on the NRHP in Ford County, Kansas
- Church of the Immaculate Heart of Mary (Scarsdale, New York)
- Immaculate Heart of Mary Church (Pittsburgh), Pennsylvania
- Immaculate Heart of Mary Church (Cleveland, Ohio)
- Immaculate Heart of Mary Church (High Point, North Carolina)

=== Elsewhere ===
- Church of Immaculate Heart of Mary, Vinkovci, Croatia
- Immaculate Heart of Mary Cathedral (Weno, Chuuk), Federated States of Micronesia
- Church of the Immaculate Heart of Mary (Lima), Peru
- Immaculate Heart of Mary Church, Kemerovo, Kuzbass, Russia
- Church of the Immaculate Heart of Mary, a Roman Catholic church in Knightsbridge, London, UK

== Seminaries ==
- Immaculate Heart of Mary Seminary, Tagbilaran City, Bohol, Philippines
- Immaculate Heart of Mary Seminary (Winona, Minnesota), US
- Immaculate Heart of Mary Abbey, Westfield, Vermont

== Other ==
- Immaculate Heart of Mary (The Fatima Group), a sculpture collection in Indianapolis, Indiana
- Immaculate Heart of Mary Seminary, Philippines

== See also ==
- Immaculate Heart of Mary Cathedral (disambiguation)
- Immaculate Heart of Mary College (disambiguation)
- Immaculate Heart of Mary School (disambiguation)
