= Immaculate Heart of Mary School =

Immaculate Heart of Mary School may refer to:

== Australia ==
- Immaculate Heart of Mary School (South Australia), a school in South Australia

== Canada ==
- Immaculate Heart of Mary School (Winnipeg)

== China ==
- Immaculate Heart of Mary School (Hong Kong), a primary school in Hong Kong

== Philippines ==
- Immaculate Heart of Mary School, Bulacan

== United Kingdom ==
- Sacred Heart of Mary Girls' School, London

== United States ==
- Cantwell-Sacred Heart of Mary High School, Montebello, California
- Immaculate Heart of Mary School (Marche, Arkansas), listed on the National Register of Historic Places
- Immaculate Heart of Mary School (Massachusetts), near Harvard, Massachusetts
- Immaculate Heart Of Mary School (New Jersey), in Wayne, New Jersey
- Immaculate Heart of Mary School (Rutland, Vermont)

== See also ==
- Immaculate Heart of Mary College (disambiguation)
- Immaculate Heart of Mary (disambiguation)
- Sacred Heart School (disambiguation)
