= Mimi Kuzyk =

Canadian actress (b. 1952)

- Born: Marilyn Iris Kuzyk; February 21, 1952 (age 74); Winnipeg, Manitoba, Canada
- Occupation: Actress
- Years active: 1979–present
- Spouse(s): Manolin Kourtikakis, 1996-present Don Clinsky (divorced)
- Children: 1, with Kourtikakis

Marilyn Iris Kuzyk (born February 21, 1952) is a Canadian actress.

== Early life ==
Kuzyk was born in Winnipeg, Manitoba to Fred and Kay Kuzyk, both of whom were Ukrainian immigrants, and received her early education at the Immaculate Heart of Mary School. She danced with the Rusalka Ukrainian dance group in Winnipeg for 12 years and briefly studied jazz dance at the Royal Winnipeg Ballet School.

== Career ==
Kuzyk's film debut was in the 1984 film, He's Fired, She's Hired. Since then, she has had roles in numerous films and television series.

She is perhaps most noted for playing Detective Patsy Mayo on Hill Street Blues from 1984 to 1986. Kuzyk played a main role as Kay Barrow on Blue Murder (2001–2004), and a recurring role as Pauline Drury on Traders (1996–1998).

Kuzyk has made guest appearances on Second City Television (1979), Remington Steele (1984), The Love Boat (1986), L.A. Law (1986 and 1987), Danger Bay (1987), Alfred Hitchcock Presents (1989), Doogie Howser, M.D. (1990), Quantum Leap (1991), The Ray Bradbury Theater (1992), Counterstrike (1993), Kung Fu: The Legend Continues (1994), Murder, She Wrote (1994), The Outer Limits (1995), Total Recall 2070 (1999), The Chris Isaak Show (2002), NCIS (2006), and Instant Star (2008).

Awards and nominations

Kuzyk received a Genie Award nomination for her work in the 2001 Canadian drama Lost and Delirious, and Gemini Award nominations for Best Supporting Actress. In 2001 she was selected to be the parade marshal for the Bloor West Village Ukrainian Festival in Toronto, Ontario.

== Personal life ==
In 1996, Kuzyk married Greek-born carpenter Manoli Kourtikakis and they have a daughter, Kaliopi. She was formerly married to Don Clinsky.

== Filmography ==
=== Film ===
Mimi Kuzyk film credits
Year	Title	Role	Notes	Ref.
1988	The Kiss	Brenda		
1989	Speed Zone	Heather Scott	AKA Cannonball Fever	
1995	Malicious	Mrs. Gordon		
1997	Men with Guns	Gwen		
1998	Bone Daddy	Kim		
1999	Water Damage	Eve Preedy		
2000	Waking the Dead	Adele Green		
2001	Lost and Delirious	Eleanor Bannet		
2002	Fairytales and Pornography	Lucille		
2002	Phase IV	Diana Holt		
2003	The Human Stain	Professor Delphine Roux		
2004	The Final Cut	Thelma		
2004	The Day After Tomorrow	Secretary of State		
2004	A Different Loyalty	Leslie Quennell		
2005	The Last Sign	Isabel		
2006	Kardia	Hope		
2007	Still Small Voices	Dr. Elaine Trussle		
2007	Homecoming	Mother	Short film	
2008	Camille	Mrs. Samuels		
2012	The Audition	Sherri Dawson	Short film	
2012	Your Side of the Bed	Wendy		
2013	Sex After Kids	Dolores		
2015	After the Ball	Bella Shapiro		
2015	Steel	Aunt Margret		
2016	Deadly Voltage	Milly	AKA When the Sky Falls	
2016	Special Correspondents	Secretary of State		
2016	A Family Man	Bernadine		
2021	The Righteous	Ethel Mason		

=== Television ===
Mimi Kuzyk television credits
Year	Title	Role	Notes	Ref.
1979	Second City Television	Extra	Episode: "Fantasy Island"	
1980	Bizarre	(various)	Television series	
1983	Loving Friends and Perfect Couples	Unknown	2 episodes	
1983	The Littlest Hobo	Irina / Paula	2 episodes	
1984	Remington Steele	Mariah Taylor	Episode: "Steele Eligible"	
1984	He's Fired, She's Hired	Maureen McCullough	Television film	
1984–1986	Hill Street Blues	Detective Patsy Mayo	Main role	
1985	Striker's Mountain	Trisha	Television film	
1985	Hotel	Laura Temple	Episode: "Echoes"	
1986	Blind Justice	Cathy Anderson	Television film	
1986	The Love Boat	Nancy Brown	Episode: "The Will / Deja Vu / The Prediction"	
1986	Starman	Liz Baynes	Episode: "The Return"	
1986	Miles to Go...	Suzanne	Television film	
1986, 1987	Heart of the City	Judge Barton	2 episodes	
1986, 1987	L.A. Law	A.D.A. Marilyn Feldman	2 episodes	
1987	The Hope Division	Anne Russell	Television film	
1987	Family Sins	Sara Burke	Television film	
1987	Danger Bay	Mother	Episode: "The Dying Swan"	
1988	Street Legal	Amanda Dublinski	Episode: "Whose Woods Are These"	
1988	Nightingales	Liz McCarren	Television film	
1989	Alfred Hitchcock Presents	Betty King	Episode: "Skeleton in the Closet"	
1989	Highway to Heaven	Debra Stone	Episode: "The Silent Bell"	
1989–1990	Wolf	Connie Bacarri	Main role	
1990	CBS Schoolbreak Special	Frances Kingston	Episode: "Maggie's Secret"	
1990	Doogie Howser, M.D.	Madam Feldbloom	Episode: "C'est la Vinnie"	
1991	Quantum Leap	Dr. Donna Eleese	Episode: "The Leap Back"	
1991	The Hidden Room	Woman in the Hidden Room	Host	
1991	False Arrest	Nadine	Television film	
1992	Stormy Weathers	Gloria Chase	Television film	
1992	The Ray Bradbury Theater	Lena Auffmann	Episode: "The Happiness Machine"	
1993	Counterstrike	Dr. Sharon Rayne	Episode: "Free to Kill"	
1993	Matrix	Julia Dunn	Episode: "Moths to a Flame"	
1993	Street Legal	Ellen Levitt	Episode: "What's Love Got to Do with It?"	
1994	I Know My Son Is Alive	Laura	Television film	
1994	Murder, She Wrote	Athena "Tina" Poulos	Episode: "The Dying Game"	
1994	The Lifeforce Experiment	Jessica Saunders	Television film. (AKA Dead Men Talk)	
1994	SeaQuest DSV	Laura Huxley	Episode: "Sympathy for the Deep"	
1994	Kung Fu: The Legend Continues	Judge Reynolds	Episode: "The Innocent"	
1995	Derby	Nita Chambers	Television film	
1995	The Outer Limits	Dr. Leslie McKenna	Episode: "Birthright"	
1995	Little Criminals	Rita	Television film	
1996	Her Desperate Choices	Dr. Baskin	Television film	
1996–1998	Traders	Pauline Drury	Recurring role	
1997	Dead Silence	Donna Harkstrawn	Television film	
1997	Breach of Faith: A Family of Cops II	Mrs. Ivanov	Television film	
1997	Poltergeist: The Legacy	Dr. Mary Alcott	Episode: "The New Guard"	
1997	Psi Factor: Chronicles of the Paranormal	Carolyn Starling	Episode: "Second Sight / Chocolate Soldier"	
1997	Any Mother's Son	Peggy Evans	Television film	
1997	The Defenders: Payback	Camille Preston	Television film	
1997	Every 9 Seconds	Carol	Television film	
1998	The Defenders: Choice of Evils	Camille Preston	Television film	
1998	F/X: The Series	Madame Olga	Episode: "Evil Eye"	
1998	My Date with the President's Daughter	Carol Richmond	Television film	
1998	The Defenders: Taking the First	Camille Preston	Television film	
1999	Blue Moon	Nora Keating	Television film	
1999	The Hunt for the Unicorn Killer	Barbra Bronfman	Television film	
1999	Total Recall 2070	Jackson Rami	Episode: "Personal Effects"	
1999	Strange Justice	Marion Gray	Television film	
1999	Cruel Justice	Elaine Metcalf	Television film	
1999	Thrill Seekers	Eleanor Grayson	Television film (AKA The Time Shifters)	
1999	In the Company of Spies	Karen Marko	Television film	
2000	The Golden Spiders: A Nero Wolfe Mystery	Laura Fromm	Television film	
2000	The Deadly Look of Love	Mrs. Murdock	Television film	
2000	Soul Food	Judge Drexel	Episode: "What Women Want"	
2000	Our Hero	Mila Stiglic	Episode: "1.5"	
2001	Dying to Dance	Kathleen Monroe	Television film	
2001–2004	Blue Murder	Kay Barrow	Main role	
2002	The Chris Isaak Show	Betty Gaylen-Petty	3 episodes	
2003	111 Gramercy Park	Joanne Karnegian	Unsold television pilot	
2004	I Do (But I Don't)	Cookie Crandall	Television film	
2004	Kink in My Hair	Iris	Television film	
2005	The L Word	Isabel	Episode: "Lynch Pin"	
2005	Kevin Hill	Judge Polk	2 episodes	
2005	Descent	Marsha Crawford	Television film	
2005	Missing	Renee	Episode: "Looking for Mr. Wright"	
2005	The Hunt for the BTK Killer	Mrs. Magida	Television film	
2006	NCIS	Ginger Stevenson	Episode: "Bloodbath"	
2006	Angela's Eyes	Karen Bench	Episode: "Open Your Eyes"	
2006	A Christmas Wedding	Katharine	Television film	
2007	Ghost Whisperer	Janet Bristow	Episode: "Dead to Rights"	
2008	Instant Star	Tommy's Mom	1 episode	
2008	XIII: The Conspiracy	Sally Sheridan	Television miniseries	
2008–2009	Sophie	Judith Parker	Regular role	
2009	The Border	Slade's Mother	Episode: "Killer Debt"	
2010	Castle	Sheila Blaine	Episode: "A Rose For Everafter"	
2010	Cold Case	Annabelle Bennet	Episode: "Free Love"	
2011	The Listener	Jeanne Raymond	Episode: "Eye of the Storm"	
2011	Covert Affairs	Nurse Jan	Episode: "World Leader Pretend"	
2011	Against the Wall	Pat McCloskey	Episode: "Countdown to Meltdown"	
2011	InSecurity	DM Caplan	2 episodes	
2012	Pegasus Vs. Chimera	Queen Caria	Television film	
2013	Bomb Girls	Alma	Episode: "The Quickening"	
2013	Lucky 7	Ruth	Episode: "Pilot"	
2013	The Husband She Met Online	Doris Miller	Television film	
2013	A Very Merry Mix-Up	Judith	Television film	
2014	Sorority Surrogate	Maureen Darlington	Television film	
2015	The Strain	Mrs. Taylor	2 episodes	
2015	Lost Girl	Judge Megaera	Episode: "Judgment Fae"	
2015–2018	UnREAL	Dr. Olive Goldberg	Recurring role	
2016	Murdoch Mysteries	Judith Baxter	Episode: "Unlucky in Love"	
2016–2021	Private Eyes	Nora Everett	8 episodes	
2016	Incorporated	Marsha	Episode: "Vertical Mobility"	
2016	Designated Survivor	Senior NSA Official	Episode: "The Blueprint"	
2016–2018	Shadowhunters	Imogen Herondale	Guest (Season 1), 1 episode Recurring (Seasons 2 & 3), 6 episodes	
2017–2021	Workin' Moms	Eleanor Galperin	Recurring role	
2018	Star Trek: Short Treks	Siobhan Tilly	Episode: "Runaway"	
2019	Christmas Wedding Runaway	Nana	Television film	

=== Video games ===
Year	Title	Role	Notes
2013	Tom Clancy's Splinter Cell: Blacklist	President Caldwell	(voice)
