= St. John Chrysostom Church =

St. John Chrysostom Church could refer to:

- St. John Chrysostom Church (Delafield, Wisconsin).
- St. John Chrysostom Byzantine Catholic Church in Pittsburgh, Pennsylvania.
- St. John Chrysostom's Church (Bronx, New York)
- St. John Chrysostom Church, Novokuznetsk
