= Immaculate Heart of Mary Cathedral (disambiguation) =

Immaculate Heart of Mary Cathedral may refer to:

- Cathedral of the Immaculate Heart of Mary, Datong, China
- Immaculate Heart of Mary Cathedral, Nzérékoré, Guinea
- Immaculate Heart of Mary Cathedral, Kottayam, India
- Immaculate Heart of Mary Cathedral (Colonia, Yap), Micronesia
- Immaculate Heart of Mary Cathedral, Bo, Sierra Leone
- Immaculate Heart of Mary Cathedral, Hsinchu, Taiwan
- Cathedral of the Immaculate Heart of Mary (Las Cruces, New Mexico), Las Cruces, New Mexico, United States

== See also ==
- Immaculate Heart of Mary (disambiguation), including Immaculate Heart of Mary Church
