= Immaculate Heart of Mary Cathedral, Bo =

Immaculate Heart of Mary Cathedral
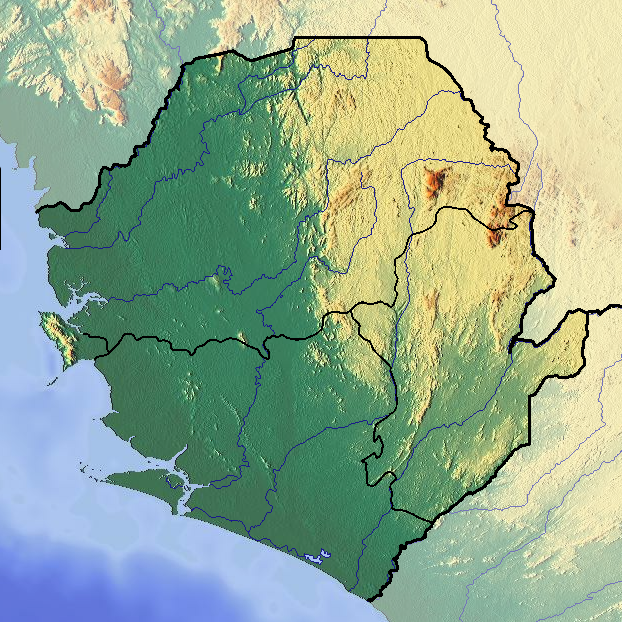
- Location within Sierra Leone Location within Africa
- Immaculate Heart of Mary Cathedral
- 7°57′47″N 11°44′15″W
- Location: Bo
- Country: Sierra Leone
- Denomination: Roman Catholic Church

The Immaculate Heart of Mary Cathedral also simply called Cathedral of Bo, is a religious building belonging to the Catholic Church, and is located in the town of Bo the second largest in population (behind Freetown, the capital) and of the Southern Province, in the African country of Sierra Leone.

The cathedral began as parish church until 2011 had the status of pro-cathedral. It follows the Roman Catholic or Latin rite and serves as the seat of the diocese of Bo (Dioecesis Boënsis) which was created in 2011 by Pope Benedict XVI through the bull Petrini ministerii.

It is under the pastoral responsibility of the Bishop Charles Allieu Matthew Campbell.

== See also ==
- Immaculate Heart of Mary Cathedral
- Roman Catholicism in Sierra Leone
