= Andrey Kirikov =

Russian lawyer and entrepreneur (born 1975)

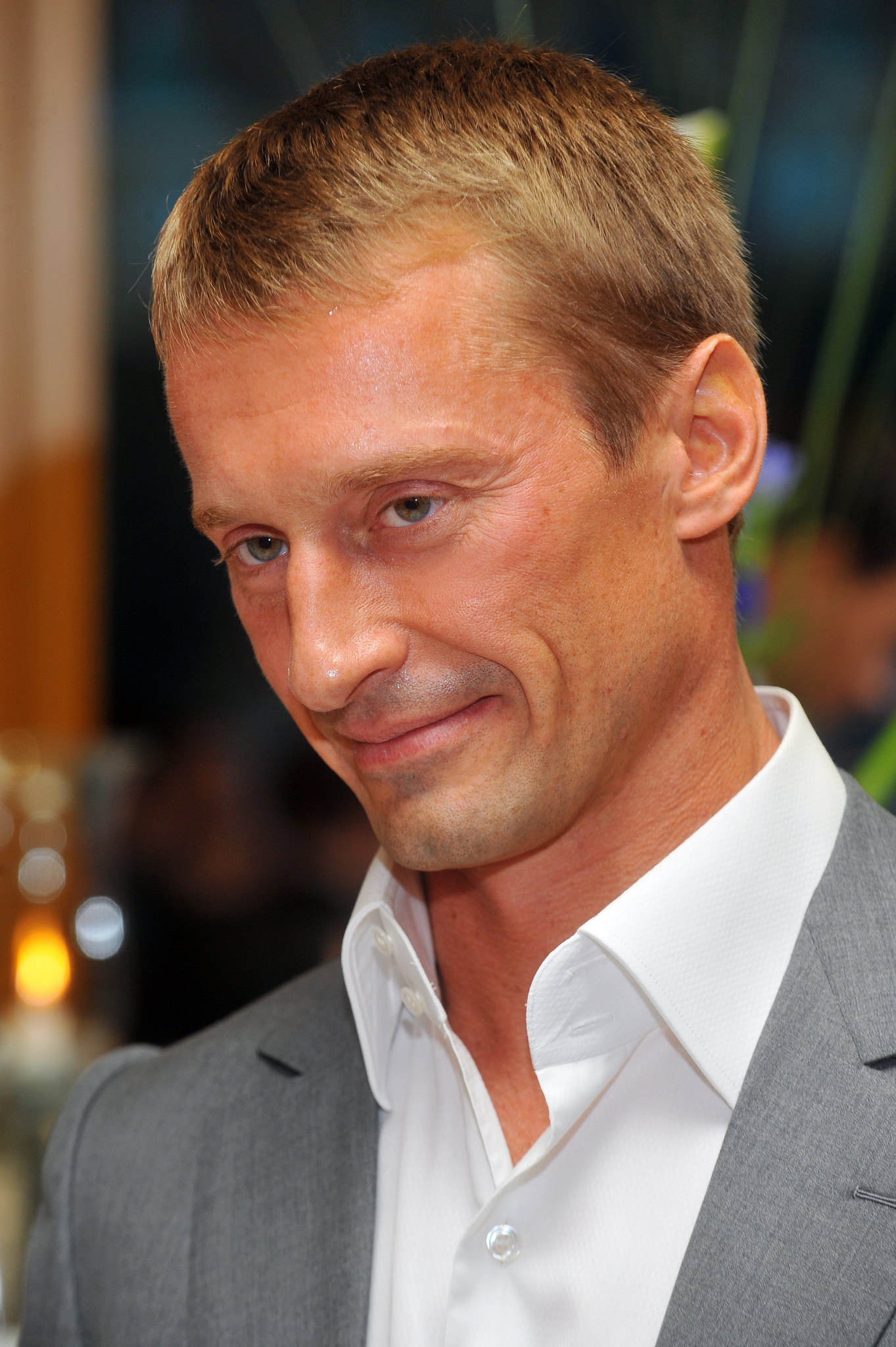
- Born: 29 September 1975 (age 50); Kemerovo, Soviet Union
- Education: Kemerovo State University
- Occupation: Director of Sibir Cement 2004–2008
- Spouse: Unknown
- Children: two sons

Andrey V. Kirikov (born 29 September 1975 in Kemerovo) is a Russian lawyer and entrepreneur. He was one of the founding shareholders of Sibir Cement Group, a major Russian cement producer.

== Biography ==
Born in Kemerovo in 1975 to a mathematician and a medical doctor, Andrey graduated from the Law School of the Kemerovo State University in 1997. After graduation, Andrey Kirikov went to work full time as a legal counsel at Kuzbassprombank, which he had joined while still in law school.

In 1999, he became legal counsel to Deputy Governor for Construction of the Kemerovo Region, moving up to Head of Legal Support for Deputy Governor for Revenue. He became Director for Legal and General Management at Kuznetsk Iron and Steel Plant in 2000, subsequently becoming head of the private Regionservice Bar Association, an NPO.

He defended his PhD thesis on legal support for crime prevention at the Griboedov Institute for International Law and Economics in 2002, earning his PhD equivalent in law. His thesis was the first law research document in Russia to formulate the concept of legal support for crime prevention as an essential category of criminology and provide theoretical underpinnings for it. In the conclusion to his thesis, Andrey Kirikov noted the need for passing a basic law in this area—the federal law on prevention of crime.

Andrey Kirikov was a director (member of the board of directors) at Sibir Cement Holding Company in 2004–2008, moving on to start an investment business of his own after that.

== Law practice and business activities ==
While still in law school, Andrey Kirikov was hired by Kuzbassprombank as a legal counsel, a position he held until 1998. His experience of legal work in banking, government service, and in the steel industry led him to start a non-profit in 2001—the private Bar Association Regionservice, which Kirikov led for eight years.

Andrey Kirikov became one of three founders, a core shareholder and board member of public joint-stock OAO Sibir Cement Holding Company, a major Russian financial and industrial groups, in 2004. True to its name, the company focused on production and marketing of Portland cement in the vast Russian region of Siberia. Kirikov was one of the key people in the Sibir Cement Group until 2008.

After resigning from Sibir Cement, together with its president and core shareholder Andrey Muravyov, Andrey Kirikov sold his 12% stake in the company. New management of Sibir Cement later sued Kirikov for more than RUB 70 million (approximately US$2.3 million at the time), claiming that Kirikov had failed to repay a loan he borrowed from the Group in 2007. The Russian media trace the roots of conflict between Sibir Cement and its former top managers to disagreements over a EUR 600-million deal to buy Set Group, the Turkish division of Italcementi Group. The Moscow City Court dismissed Sibir Cement's claims against Kirikov on 24 January 2013.

Andrey Kirikov has been a Director at Mercury Capital Trust, an asset management firm, since 2008.

== Family ==
In the summer of 1995, Andrey married his elementary and high school classmate Alina Kaidorina, whom he had met in the second grade.

Andrey and Alina Kirikovs have two sons, Igor (b. 1999) and Demyan (b. 2007). Andrey Kirikov is an avid hunter, scuba diver, amateur boxer and alpine skier.
