= Immaculate Heart of Mary Church, Kemerovo =

Coordinates: 55.3505°N 86.0725°E

Immaculate Heart of Mary Church
- Храм Непорочного Сердца Пресвятой Девы Марии
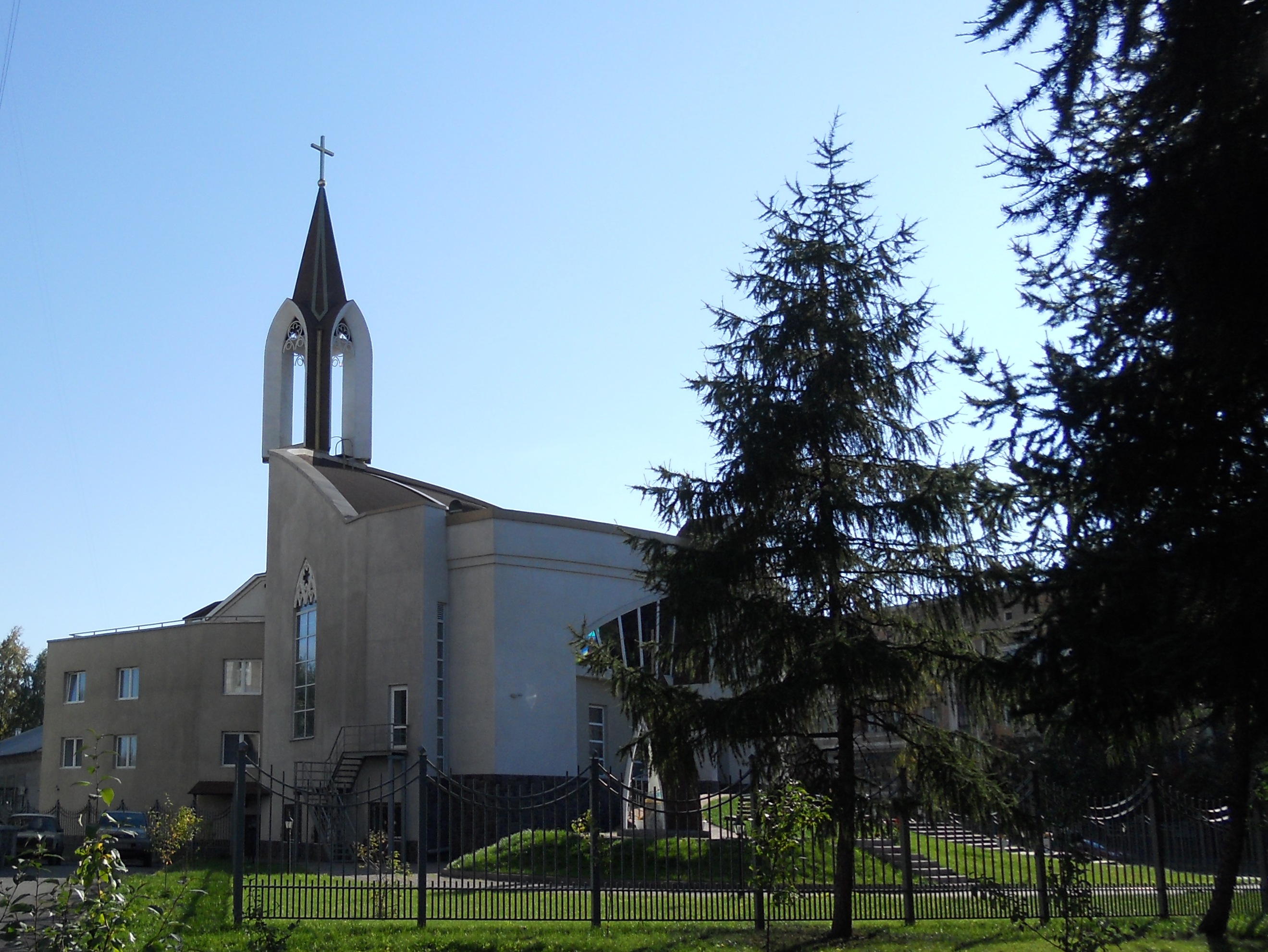
- Immaculate Heart of Mary Church
- Location: Kemerovo
- Country: Russia
- Denomination: Roman Catholic Church

The Immaculate Heart of Mary Church (Russian: Храм Непорочного Сердца Пресвятой Девы Марии) is a Catholic church in Kemerovo, in the region of Kuzbass, Russia. It was consecrated in 2009 and serves the diocese of Novosibirsk. This is the second Catholic church in the area to be built since the Revolution of October 1917. The first church on the site is St. John Novokuznetsk, dedicated a few years ago.

== History ==
The priests of the Congregation of the Redemptorists have been active in the area of Kuzbass since 1996, but congregations were held in private apartments. The first Mass was held on December 22, 1996, in a rented room in the house of culture. The parish had to wait ten years before receiving permission to build a church, which was consecrated on September 27, 2009, in honor of the Immaculate Heart of Mary, with the participation of Bishop Joseph Werth, head of the diocese.

== See also ==
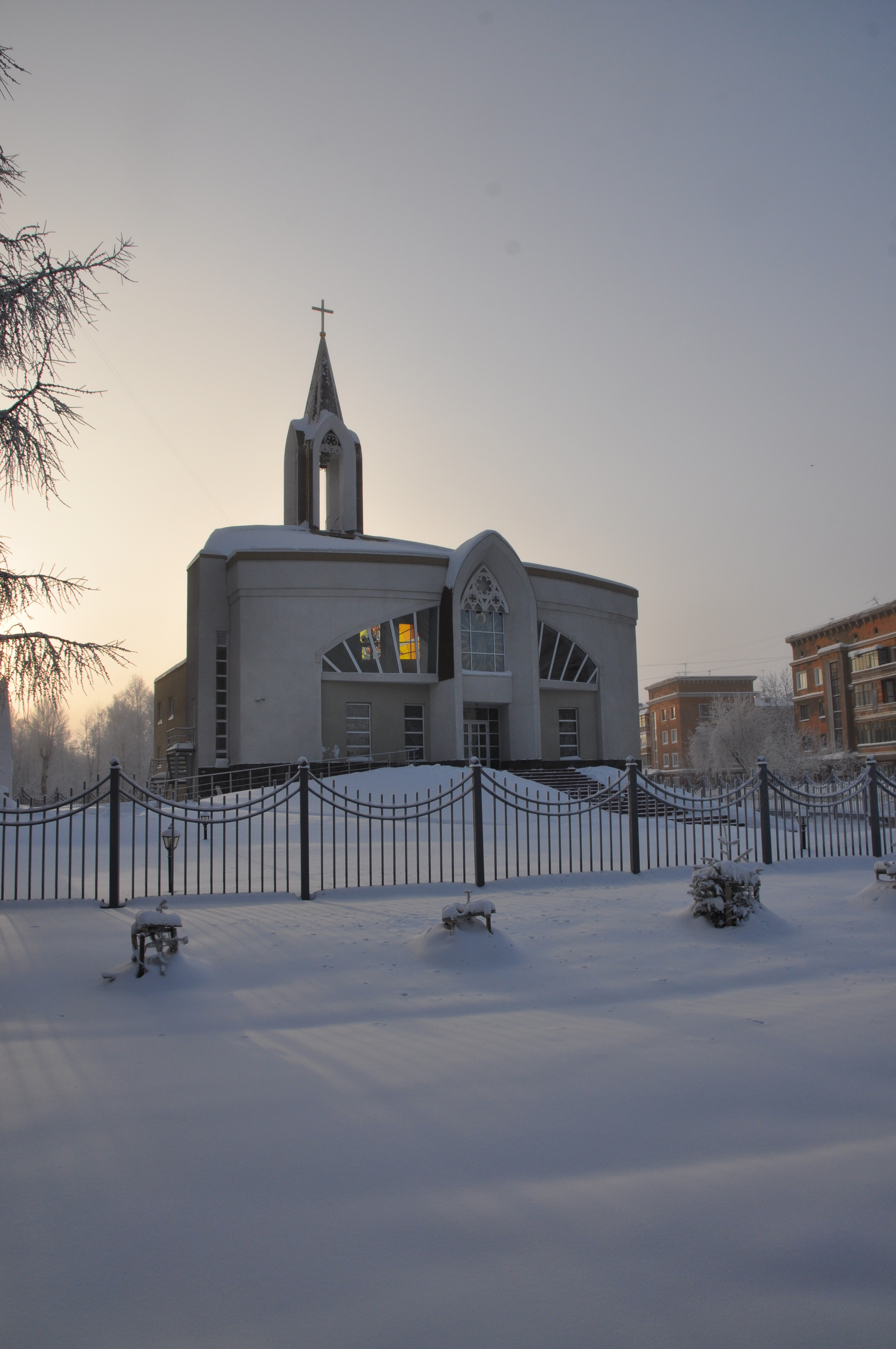
The Church in Winter

- Roman Catholicism in Russia
