= Kemerovo =

City in Kemerovo Oblast, Russia

Kemerovo Кемерово
- City
- Sovetov Square Liberator Soldier Memorial Kuzbass Arena Krasnaya Gorka Museum-Reserve Monument "In Memory of Kuzbass Miners"

- Flag Coat of arms
- Interactive map of Kemerovo
- Location of Kemerovo Kemerovo (Kemerovo Oblast)
- Coordinates: 55°22′N 86°04′E
- Country: Russia
- Federal subject: Kemerovo Oblast
- Founded: May 9, 1918

Government
  - Body: City Council of People's Deputies
  - Head: Dmitry Anisimov
- Elevation: 140 m (460 ft)

Population (2010 Census)
  - Total: 532,981
  - Estimate (2025): 542,928 (+1.9%)
  - Rank: 30th in 2010

Administrative status
  - Subordinated to: Kemerovo City Under Oblast Jurisdiction
  - Capital of: Kemerovo Oblast, Kemerovsky District

Municipal status
  - Urban okrug: Kemerovsky Urban Okrug
  - Capital of: Kemerovsky Urban Okrug, Kemerovsky Municipal District
- Time zone: UTC+7 (MSK+4)
- Postal codes: 650000–650004, 650010, 650014, 650016, 650021, 650023–650026, 650029, 650031–650033, 650035, 650036, 650040, 650042–650044, 650051, 650052, 650054–650056, 650060, 650061, 650064–650066, 650068, 650070, 650071, 650700, 650880, 650890, 650899, 650920, 650940–950957, 650960, 650961, 650971–650979, 650991–650993, 650997–650999
- Dialing code: +7 3842
- OKTMO ID: 32701000001
- City Day: June 12
- Website: www.kemerovo.ru

Kemerovo (Russian: Ке́мерово, IPA: [ˈkʲemʲɪrəvə]) is an industrial city and the administrative center of Kemerovo Oblast, Russia, located at the confluence of the Iskitimka and Tom Rivers, in the major coal mining region of the Kuznetsk Basin. Population: 557,119 (2021 census); 532,981 (2010 census); 484,754 (2002 census); 520,263 (1989 Soviet census).

Historical population
Year	Pop.	±%
1926	21,726	—
1939	132,824	+511.4%
1959	277,671	+109.1%
1970	384,989	+38.6%
1979	470,640	+22.2%
1989	520,263	+10.5%
2002	484,754	−6.8%
2010	532,981	+9.9%
2021	557,119	+4.5%
Source: Census data

The city was known as Shcheglovsk until 27 March 1932.

== History ==
Kemerovo is an amalgamation of, and successor to, several older Russian settlements. A waypoint named Verkhotomsky ostrog was established nearby in 1657 on a road from Tomsk to Kuznetsk fortress. In 1701, the settlement of Shcheglovsk was founded on the left bank of the Tom. Soon it became a village. By 1859, seven villages existed where modern Kemerovo is now: Shcheglovka (or Ust-Iskitimskoye), Kemerovo (named in 1734), Yevseyevo, Krasny Yar, Kur-Iskitim (Pleshki), Davydovo (Ishanovo), and Borovaya. In 1721, coal was discovered in the area. The first coal mines were established in 1907, later a chemical plant was established in 1916. By 1917, the population of Shcheglovo had grown to around 4,000 people.

The area's further development was boosted by the construction of a railway between Yurga and Kolchugino (now Leninsk-Kuznetsky) with a connection between Topki and Shcheglovo. Shcheglovo was granted town status on 9 May 1918, which is now considered to be the date of Kemerovo's founding; and was later known as Shcheglovsk. The town became the central location for the Kuzbass Autonomous Industrial Colony which was established there in 1921. 650 workers from 20 countries settled there and set up what became the Kemerovo Coke Chemical Plant. Some of their descendants visited the modern factory in 2011.

On 27 May 1932, Shcheglovsk was renamed Kemerovo and became the administrative center of Kemerovo Oblast in 1943.

In 1997, a memorial stone to those executed during the Great Terror was set up on the wasteland of the closed Yagunovskaya mine by the Memory (Pamyat) history club of School No 50.

In 2018, 60 people were killed by a fire in a shopping mall. In 2022, at least 20 people were killed by a fire in a nursing home.

== Etymology ==
The city was named after the village of Kemerovo, named after the surname of the first settlers of the Kemerovs. The ending "ovo" suggests a toponymic transition through a personal name. The village gave its name to the Kemerovo mine that arose under it. In 1925, the city of Scheglovsk was formed from two neighboring villages Kemerovo and Scheglovo, which in 1932 was renamed to Kemerovo after the name of the mine. According to others, the name is based on the Turkic word kemer, meaning "cliff, coast". The inhabitants of the city are called: Kemerovochanin, Kemerovochanka, Kemerovochane.

== Administrative and municipal status ==
The Administrative divisions of Kemerovo consists of five districts;

- Zavodsky
- Kirovsky
- Leninsky
- Rudnichny
- Tsentraly

Kemerovo is the administrative center of the oblast and, within the framework of administrative divisions, it also serves as the administrative center of Kemerovsky District, even though it is not a part of it. As an administrative division, it is incorporated separately as Kemerovo City Under Oblast Jurisdiction—an administrative unit with a status equal to that of the districts. As a municipal division, Kemerovo City Under Oblast Jurisdiction is incorporated as Kemerovsky Urban Okrug.

== Politics ==
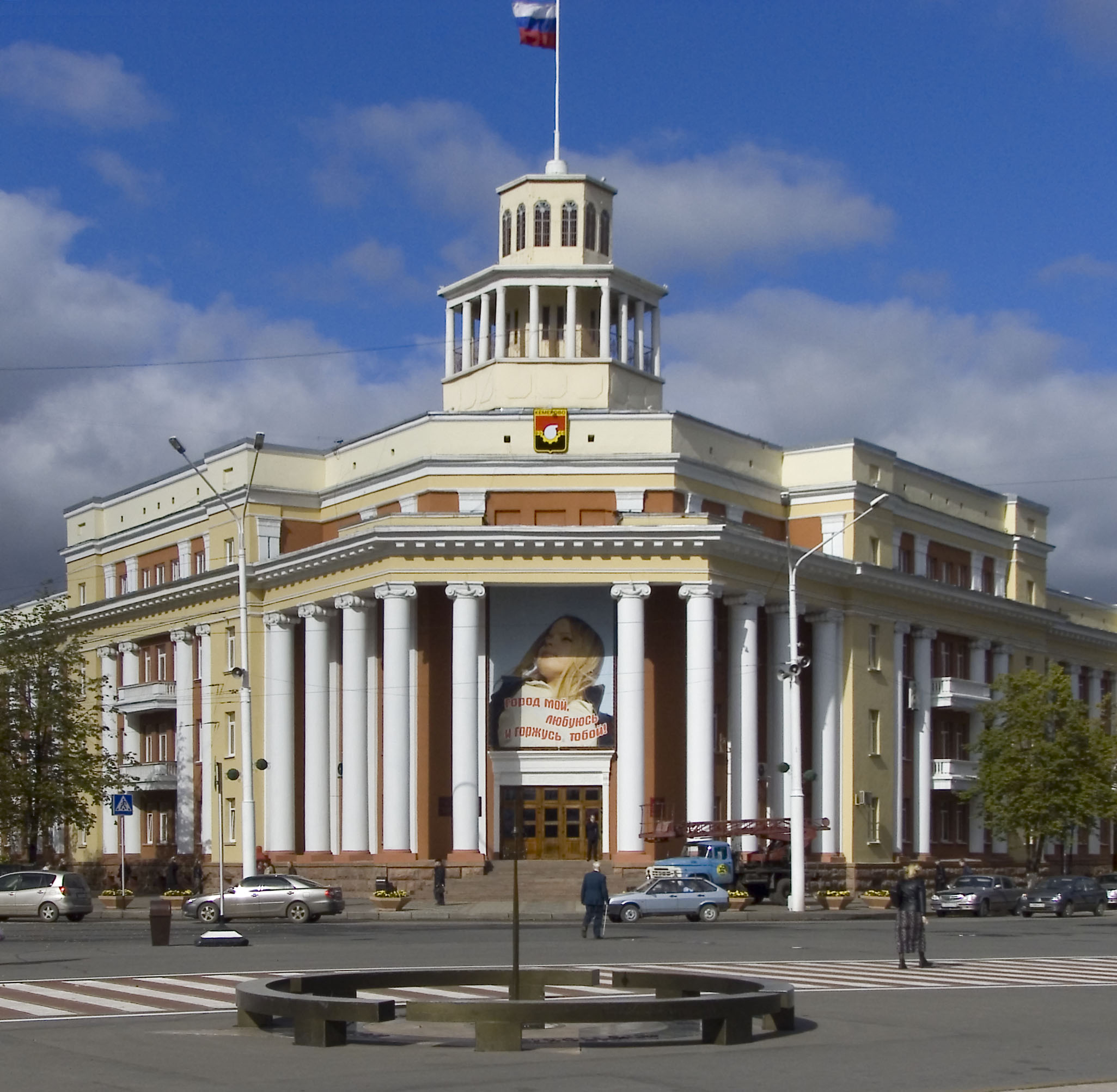
Building of the City Administration and the City Council of People's Deputies (Sovetsky Prospect, 54)

=== Council of People's Deputies ===
The Kemerovo City Council of People's Deputies is a representative body of power comprising 36 deputies. The term of office of deputies is five years.

On 13 March 2011, elections to the Council of People's Deputies were held, following which the seats in the council were distributed as follows: 31 - United Russia, 2 - A Just Russia, and 2 - Patriots of Russia. Grigory Verzhitsky, a representative of United Russia and a deputy from the 16th constituency of Kemerovo, was elected chairman. At the sixty-eighth meeting of the Kemerovo City Council, Verzhitsky's resignation as chairman was accepted at his own request. Since 2017, the city council has been headed by Nikolai Senchurov. Since 2021, the council has been headed by Yuri Andreyev.

== Economy ==
The industrialization of Kemerovo was driven and underpinned by coal mining and by the heavy industry based on the availability of coal. It remains an important industrial city, built up during the Soviet period, with important steel, aluminum and machinery based manufacturing plants along with chemical, fertilizer, and other manufacturing industries. Since the disintegration of the Soviet Union, the city's industries have experienced a severe decline, creating high levels of unemployment. Major companies based in the city include Siberian Business Union.

== Transportation ==
=== Public transport ===
The public transport network of Kemerovo consists of 70 city bus routes (including 6 seasonal), 63 suburban (including 35 seasonal), 53 public taxi routes (including 2 seasonal), 5 tram, and 9 trolleybus routes.

686 transport units enter the streets of the city every day, including:

- 201 buses of city and suburban routes;
- 364 units of route taxis;
- 121 units of electric transport.

The fare in public transport is 20 rubles, in express buses - 21 rubles, in fixed-route taxis - 22 rubles (as of 24 March 2019). Free Wi-Fi was used in all Kemerovo trams to attract passenger traffic.

On 6 June 2024, one person was killed and over 140 injured when a tram ran away after apparently suffering a brake failure. Two people were arrested and accused of allowing a disabled tram to operate.

=== Air transportation ===
The city is served by Kemerovo International Airport that reside 2.5 kilometres (1.6 mi) to the south-east of the city. It has one runway with artificial turf of class B that is 3,200 metres (10,500 ft) long. The airport is named after the Russian cosmonaut Alexei Leonov, a native of Kuzbass. There are two bus routes to the airport - 101 and 126.

=== Railway transportation ===
Kemerovo is linked to western Russia by a branch of the Trans-Siberian Railway and has the Kemerovo Railway station.

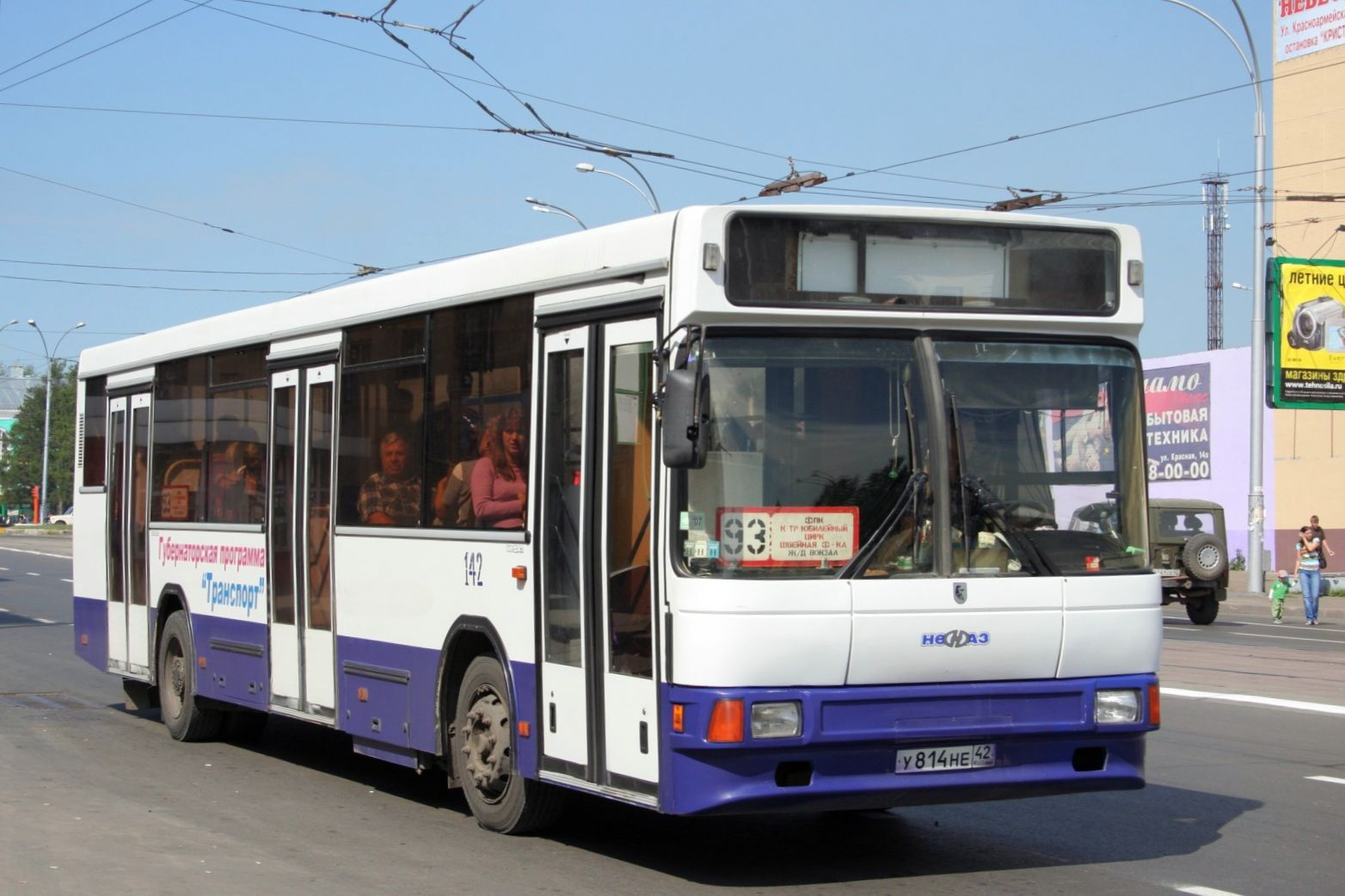
NefAZ-5299 bus

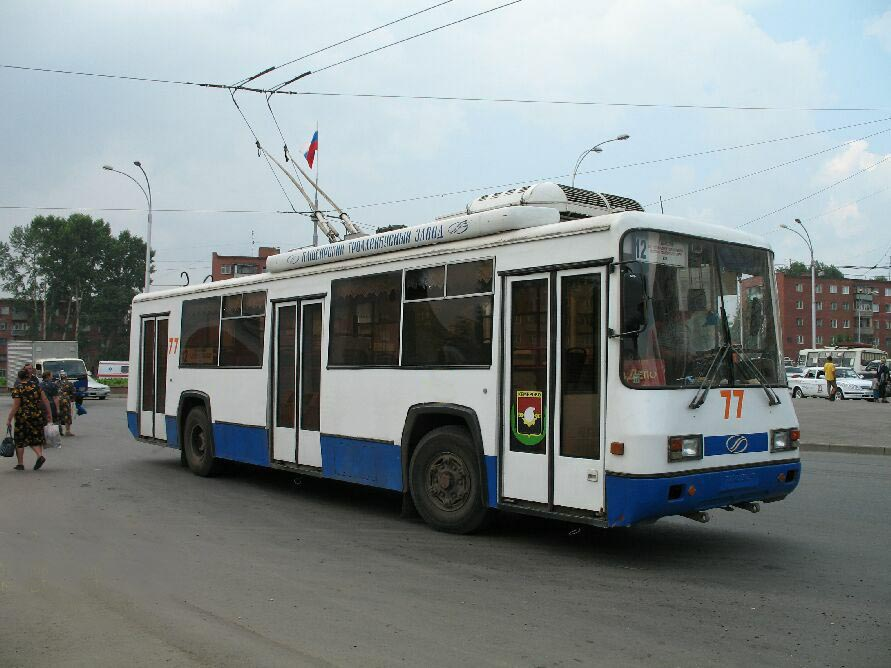
BTZ-52761 trolleybus

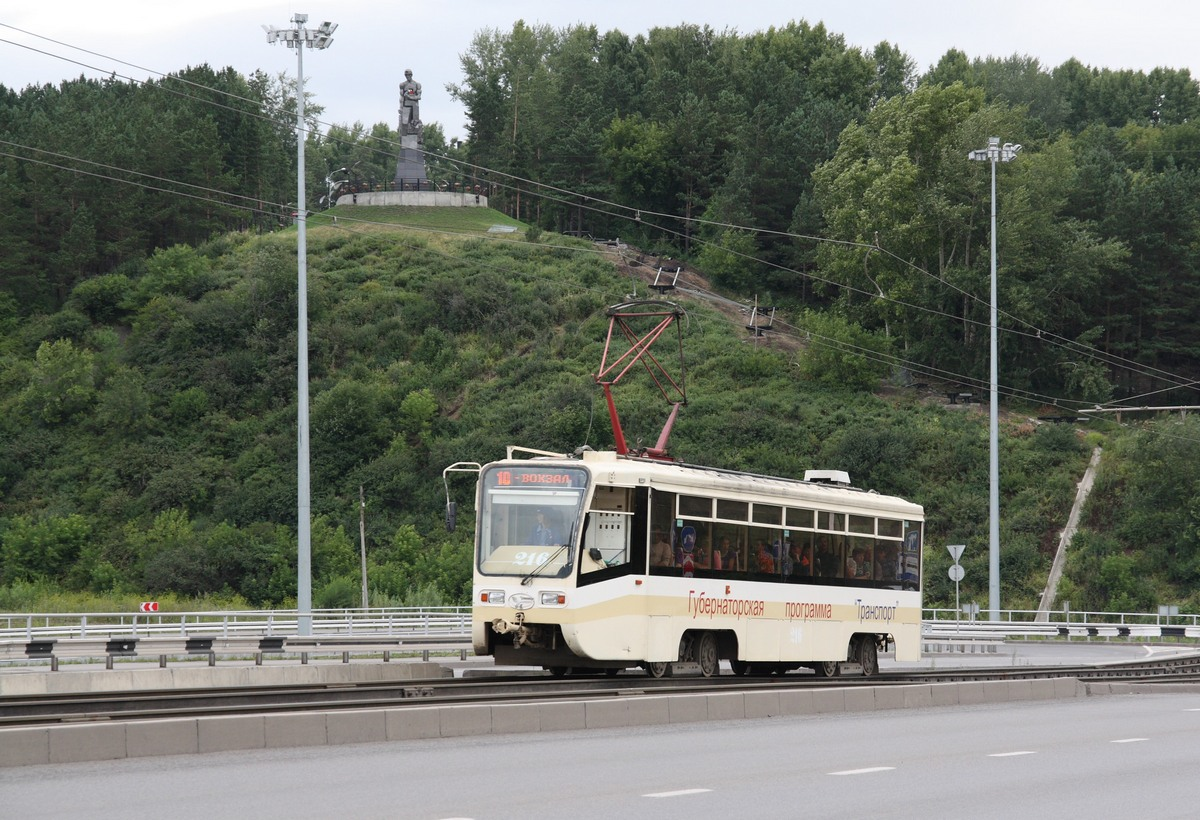
KTM-19 tram

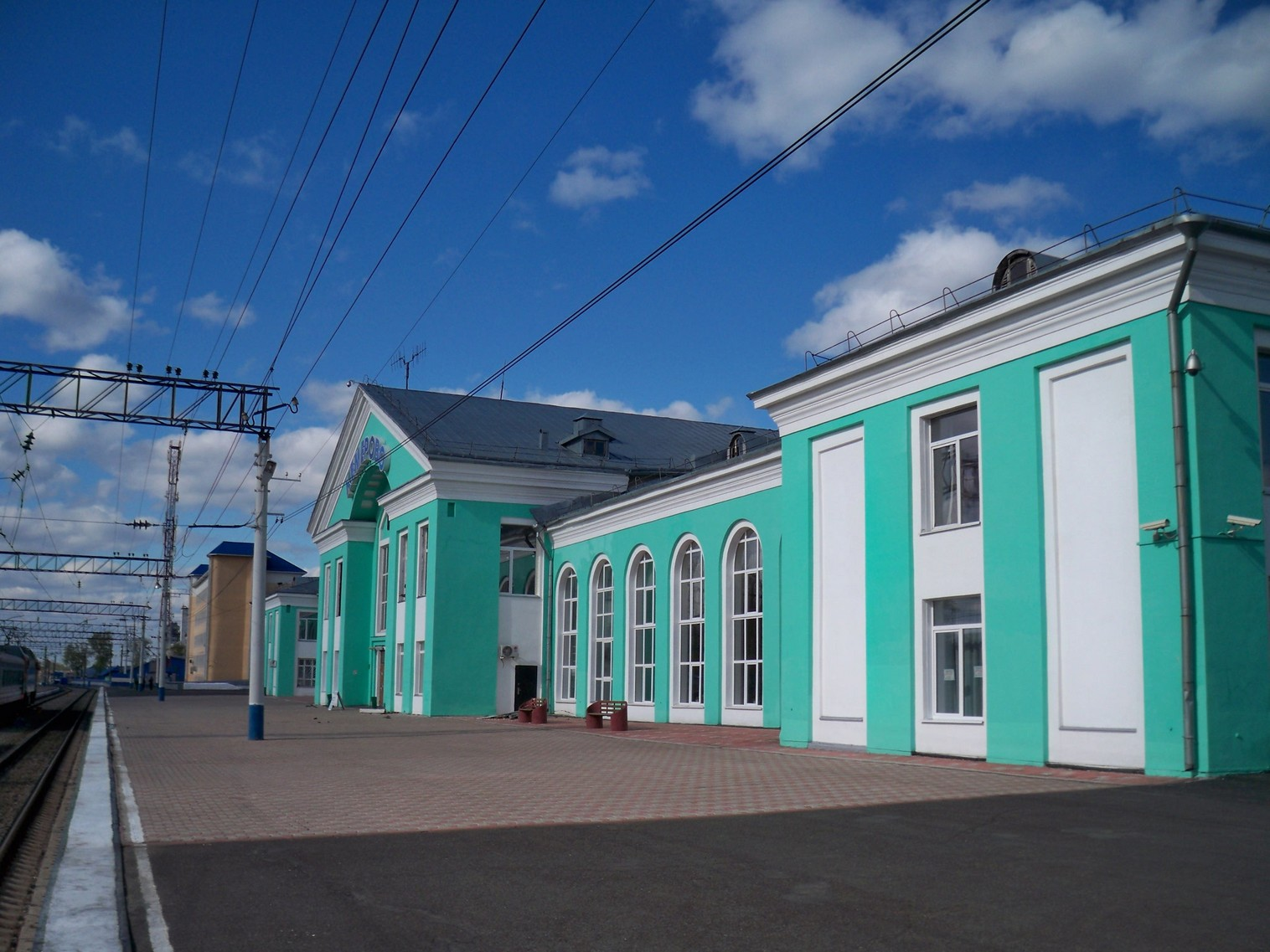
Kemerovo railroad station

== Education ==
Six higher education institutions are located in Kemerovo: Kemerovo State University, Kuzbass State Technical University, Kemerovo Institute of Food Industry (University), Kemerovo State Medical Academy, Kemerovo State Institute of Culture and Kemerovo Agricultural Institute.

== Sport ==
The public interest for bandy is widespread in Russia. 26,000 watched the opening game of the 2011–12 Russian Bandy League when local club Kuzbass played against Dynamo Moscow and Kuzbass is among the very best in the Russian Bandy League. The 2007 Bandy World Championship was held in the city. Female bandy only exists in a few places in Russia. Now Kemerovo is about to start it up. Moscow already had two multi-use indoor arenas where bandy can be played. Kemerovo got the first one in Russia specifically built for bandy (today also Khabarovsk and Ulyanovsk have it). Kuzbass plays the matches in the league at Khimik Stadium because of the big public interest. That arena has a capacity of 32000. As it also is equipped with artificial ice, Kemerovo has the best infrastructure for developing bandy in Russia.

Since 2013 there has been a "bandy on boots" tournament for national diasporas living in Kuzbass.

The Kuzbass Kemerovo motorcycle speedway team regularly participated in the Soviet Union Championship from 1968 through to 1992. After the dissolution of the Soviet Union, the team disbanded. However, the team won the silver medal in 1988 and the bronze medal in 1986 and 1987. Occasional ice speedway is held on the Mototrack Rosto DOSAAF at (55°20′19″N 86°02′26″E).

== Climate ==
Kemerovo's position gives it a humid continental climate (Köppen Dfb) with warm summers and long, severely cold winters. Its average temperatures vary from −17 °C (1 °F) in January to 19 °C (66 °F) in July. It has fairly low precipitation of around 525 mm (20.7 in) annually.

Climate data for Kemerovo (1991–2020, extremes 1955–present)
Month	Jan	Feb	Mar	Apr	May	Jun	Jul	Aug	Sep	Oct	Nov	Dec	Year
Record high °C (°F)	6.0 (42.8)	6.8 (44.2)	14.6 (58.3)	30.2 (86.4)	34.4 (93.9)	35.7 (96.3)	38.0 (100.4)	36.3 (97.3)	33.1 (91.6)	24.5 (76.1)	13.8 (56.8)	5.8 (42.4)	38.0 (100.4)
Mean daily maximum °C (°F)	−12.7 (9.1)	−8.7 (16.3)	−0.4 (31.3)	9.6 (49.3)	18.6 (65.5)	23.9 (75.0)	25.7 (78.3)	23.1 (73.6)	15.9 (60.6)	7.6 (45.7)	−3.5 (25.7)	−10.1 (13.8)	7.4 (45.3)
Daily mean °C (°F)	−17.3 (0.9)	−14.5 (5.9)	−6.4 (20.5)	3.3 (37.9)	11.2 (52.2)	17.1 (62.8)	19.3 (66.7)	16.4 (61.5)	9.7 (49.5)	2.6 (36.7)	−7.3 (18.9)	−14.4 (6.1)	1.6 (34.9)
Mean daily minimum °C (°F)	−21.7 (−7.1)	−19.4 (−2.9)	−11.6 (11.1)	−2.0 (28.4)	4.6 (40.3)	10.7 (51.3)	13.4 (56.1)	10.9 (51.6)	4.8 (40.6)	−1.2 (29.8)	−10.8 (12.6)	−18.7 (−1.7)	−3.4 (25.9)
Record low °C (°F)	−47.9 (−54.2)	−47.1 (−52.8)	−39.9 (−39.8)	−32.4 (−26.3)	−12.6 (9.3)	−5.7 (21.7)	0.5 (32.9)	−1.2 (29.8)	−9.4 (15.1)	−27.9 (−18.2)	−39.5 (−39.1)	−48.4 (−55.1)	−48.4 (−55.1)
Average precipitation mm (inches)	29 (1.1)	22 (0.9)	21 (0.8)	25 (1.0)	42 (1.7)	65 (2.6)	78 (3.1)	63 (2.5)	47 (1.9)	44 (1.7)	46 (1.8)	43 (1.7)	525 (20.7)
Average rainy days	0.3	0.3	2	9	15	15	14	15	16	12	4	0	103
Average snowy days	22	19	16	10	2	0.1	0	0	1	11	20	24	125
Average relative humidity (%)	79	78	75	67	58	67	73	76	75	77	80	80	74
Mean monthly sunshine hours	60	99	165	207	255	282	299	240	161	96	58	43	1,965
Source 1: Pogoda.ru.net
Source 2: Climatebase (sun 1955–2012)

== City symbols ==
=== Coat of arms ===
Coat of arms of Kemerovo

The heraldic description of the coat of arms of the city of Kemerovo is the following: in the crossed scarlet and black field, there is a narrow golden belt in the form of two diverging heads of grain ears, behind them there is a golden cogwheel that goes down; there is a silver retort in the middle, its neck tilted to the right.

The figures of the coat of arms of the city of Kemerovo symbolize the historically established main directions of the industrial development of the city:

- retort - chemical industry;
- cogwheel - mechanical engineering;
- ears of corn - the fertility of the land associated with the use of mineral fertilizers produced at the chemical enterprises of the city.

The colors used in the coat of arms symbolize:

- scarlet (red) - work, courage, energy, and strength;
- black color - wisdom, as well as the main wealth of the region, the center of which is the city of Kemerovo, - coal;
- silver (white) - pure thoughts, reliability, and kindness;
- gold (yellow) - wealth and prosperity.

=== Flag ===
Flag of Kemerovo

The flag of the city of Kemerovo is based on the city's coat of arms and repeats its symbolism. It is a rectangular double-sided panel with a width to length ratio of 2:3. It displays figures from the coat of arms of the city of Kemerovo. The colors used are red, black, yellow, and white.

=== Emblem ===
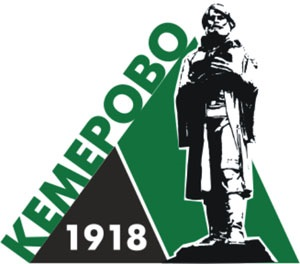
Emblem of Kemerovo

The emblem of Kemerovo displays the monument of Mikhailo Volkov, the discoverer of coal in the area. The sculpture of Mikhailo Volkov displayed on the pedestal fragment styled like a rock. Behind the monument, there is a black triangle that symbolizes a spoil tip. The inscription of the city's name ("Кемерово" in Russian) resides on the diagonal from the left bottom side of the triangle. In the black part of the triangle, the year of the foundation of the city is displayed - "1918".

== Numismatics ==
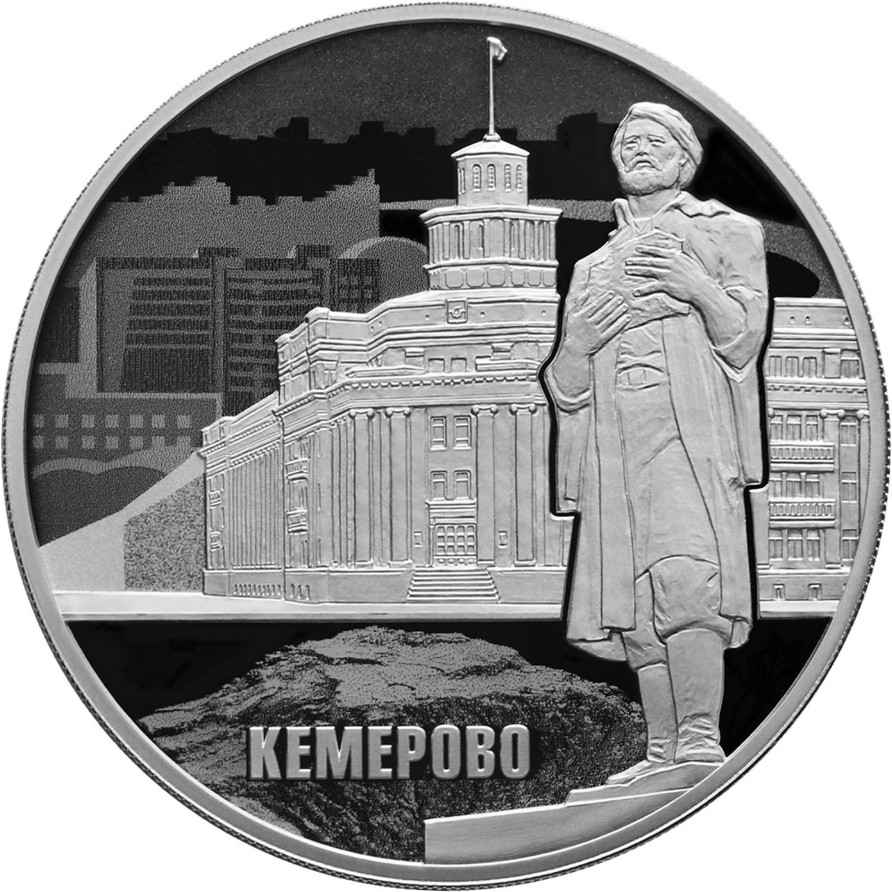
Silver coin "Centenary of the Foundation of Kemerovo" (2018)

In 2018 Bank of Russia issued into circulation the commemorative silver coin in denomination of 3 rubles "Centenary of the Foundation of Kemerovo" which displays the statue of Mikhailo Volkov.

== Notable people ==
- Yuri Arbachakov, boxer
- Maria Barakova, mezzo-soprano; winner of Glinka and Tchaikovsky classical music competitions
- Andreas Beck, association football player
- Vladimir Beliak, Israeli lawmaker
- Diana Borisova, rhythmic gymnast
- Julia Chernogorova, Great British Bake Off contestant
- Marina Domashenko, opera singer
- Vyacheslav Ivanenko, retired race walker
- Andrey Kirikov, lawyer and entrepreneur
- Vladimir Makeev, alpine skier
- Erast Osipyan, Russian professional footballer of Armenian descent
- Alexei Leonov, cosmonaut; honorable citizen of Kemerovo
- Alexandra Merkulova, retired rhythmic gymnast
- Slava Mogutin, artist
- Wladimir Sukhatsky, TV producer
- Aman Tuleyev, governor of Kemerovo Oblast
- Nikolai Knyzhov, NHL player for the San Jose Sharks
- Artem Vakhitov, kickboxer
- Yuliya Karimova, Russian-born Azerbaijani volleyball player

== Twin towns – sister cities ==
Kemerovo is twinned with:

- Salgótarján, Hungary

== Gallery ==
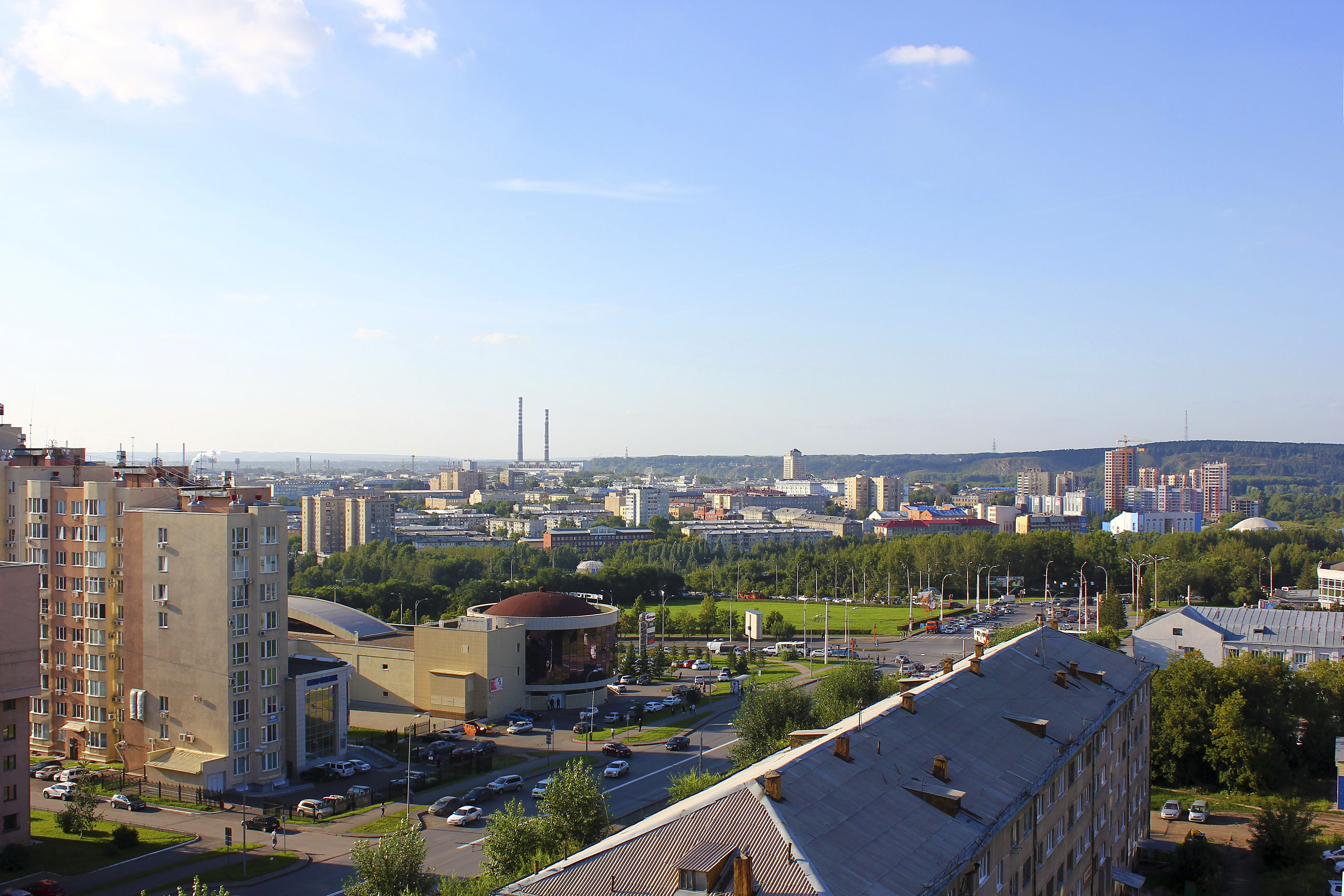

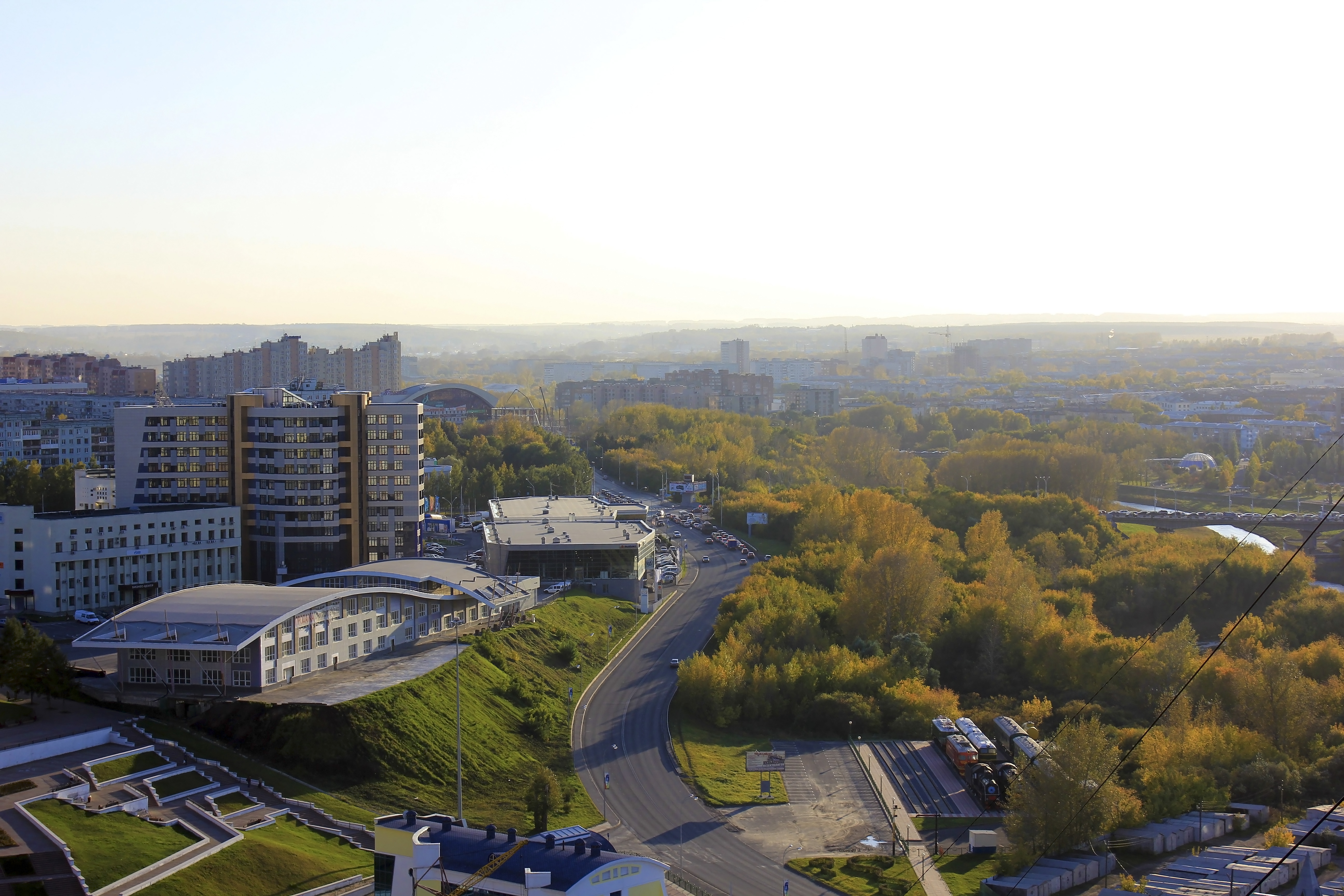

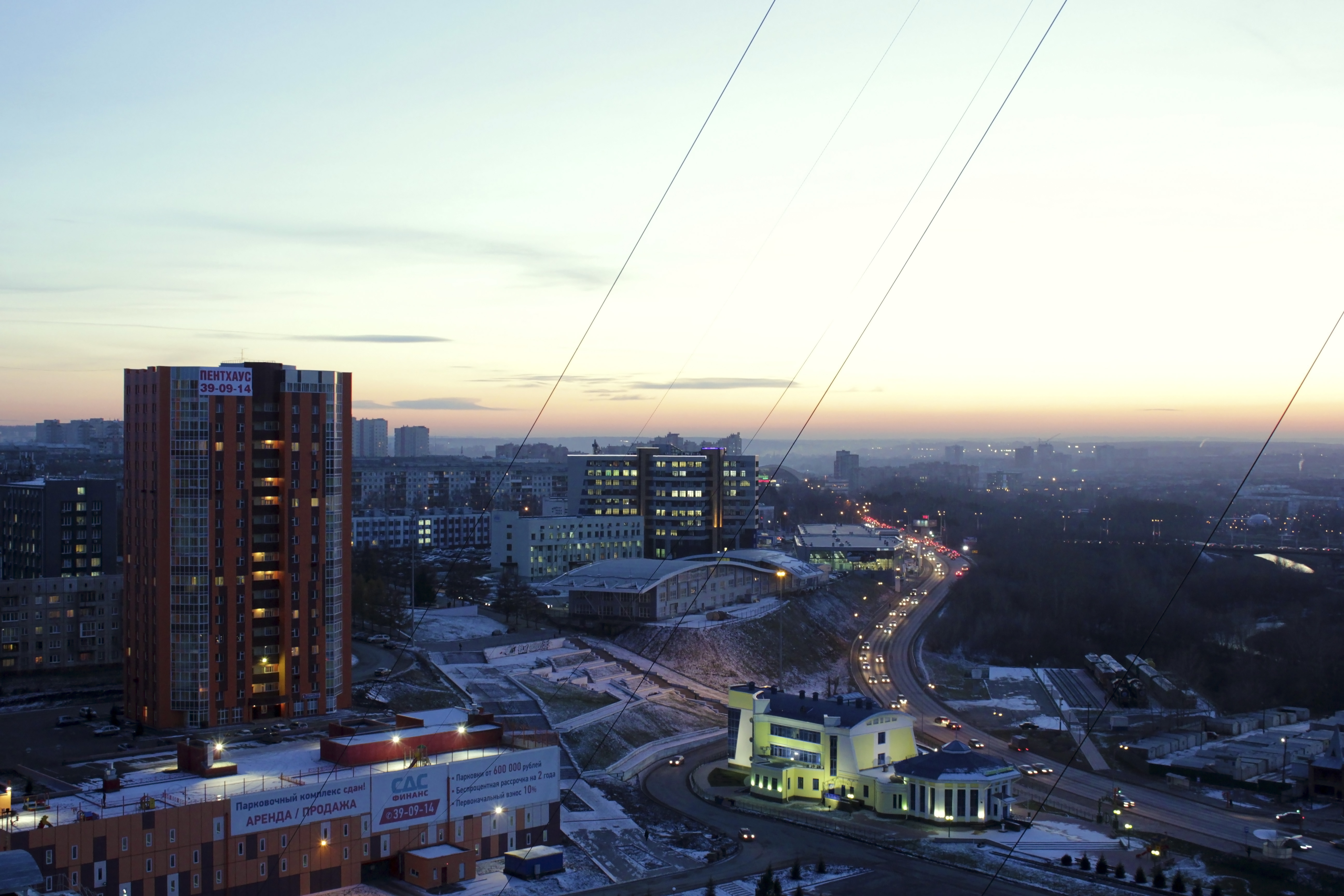

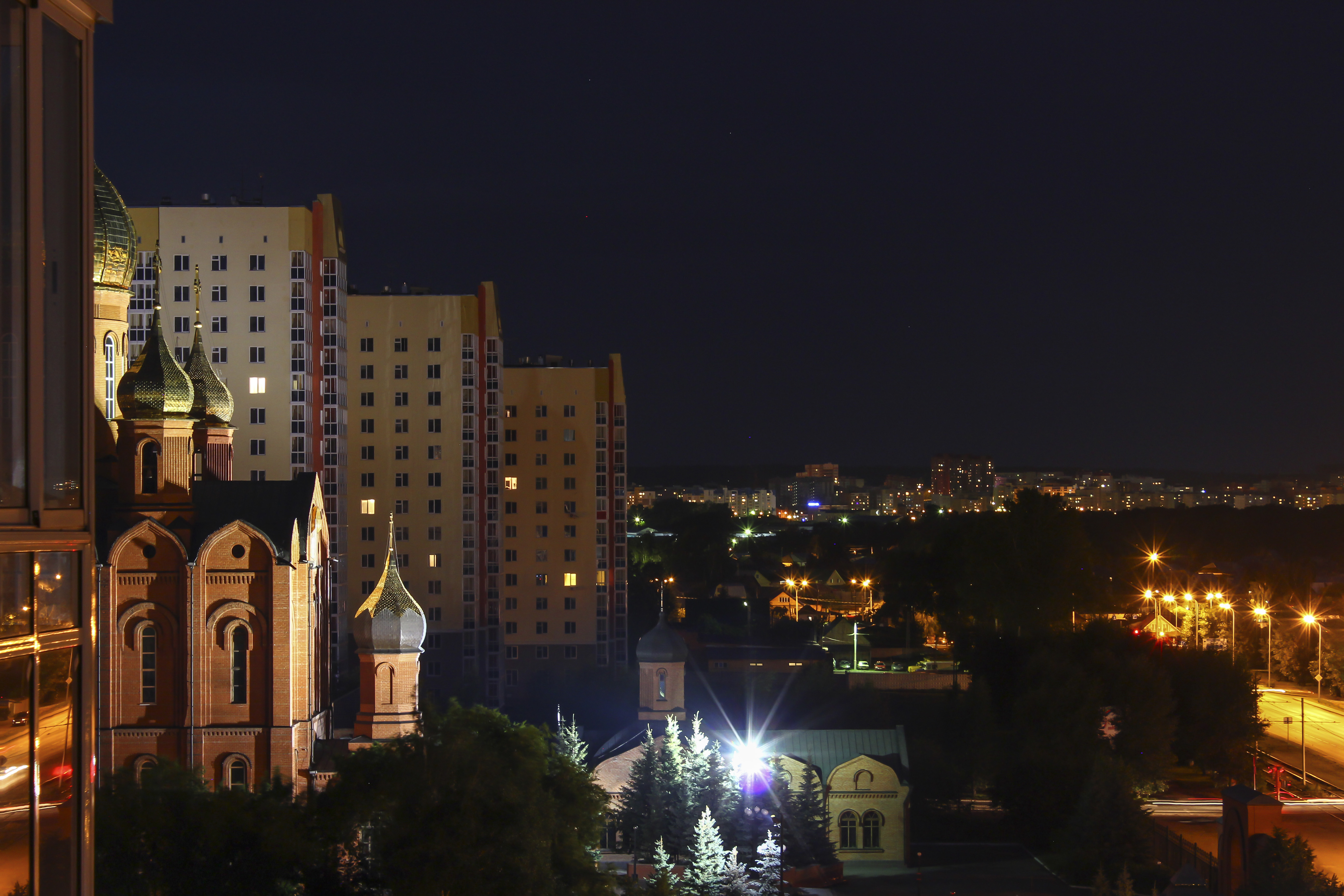

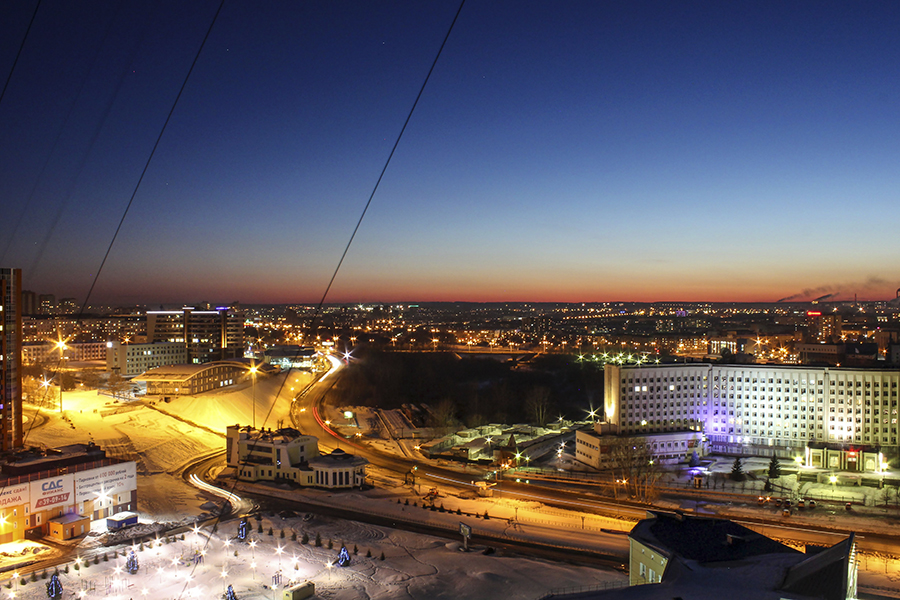

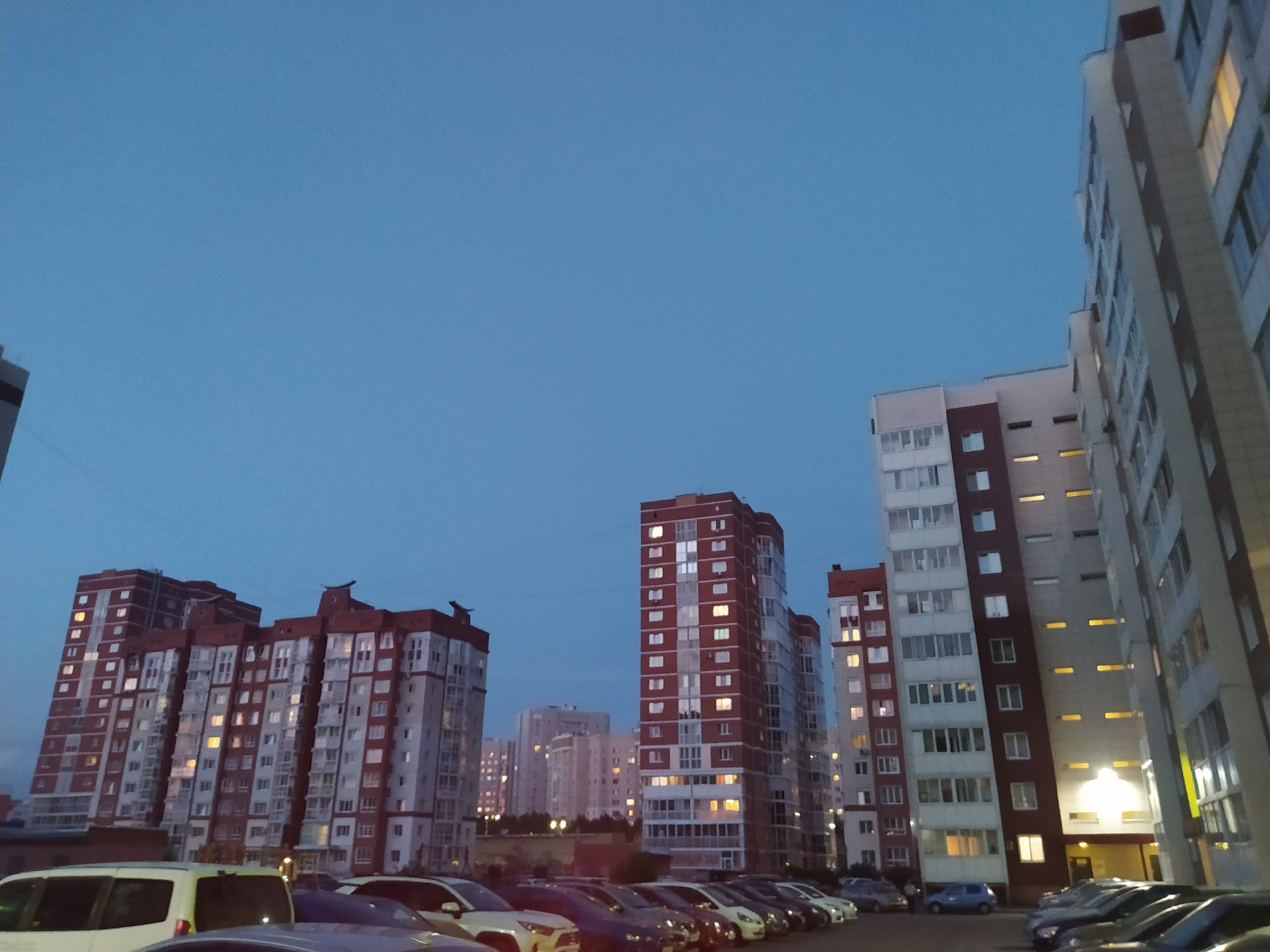

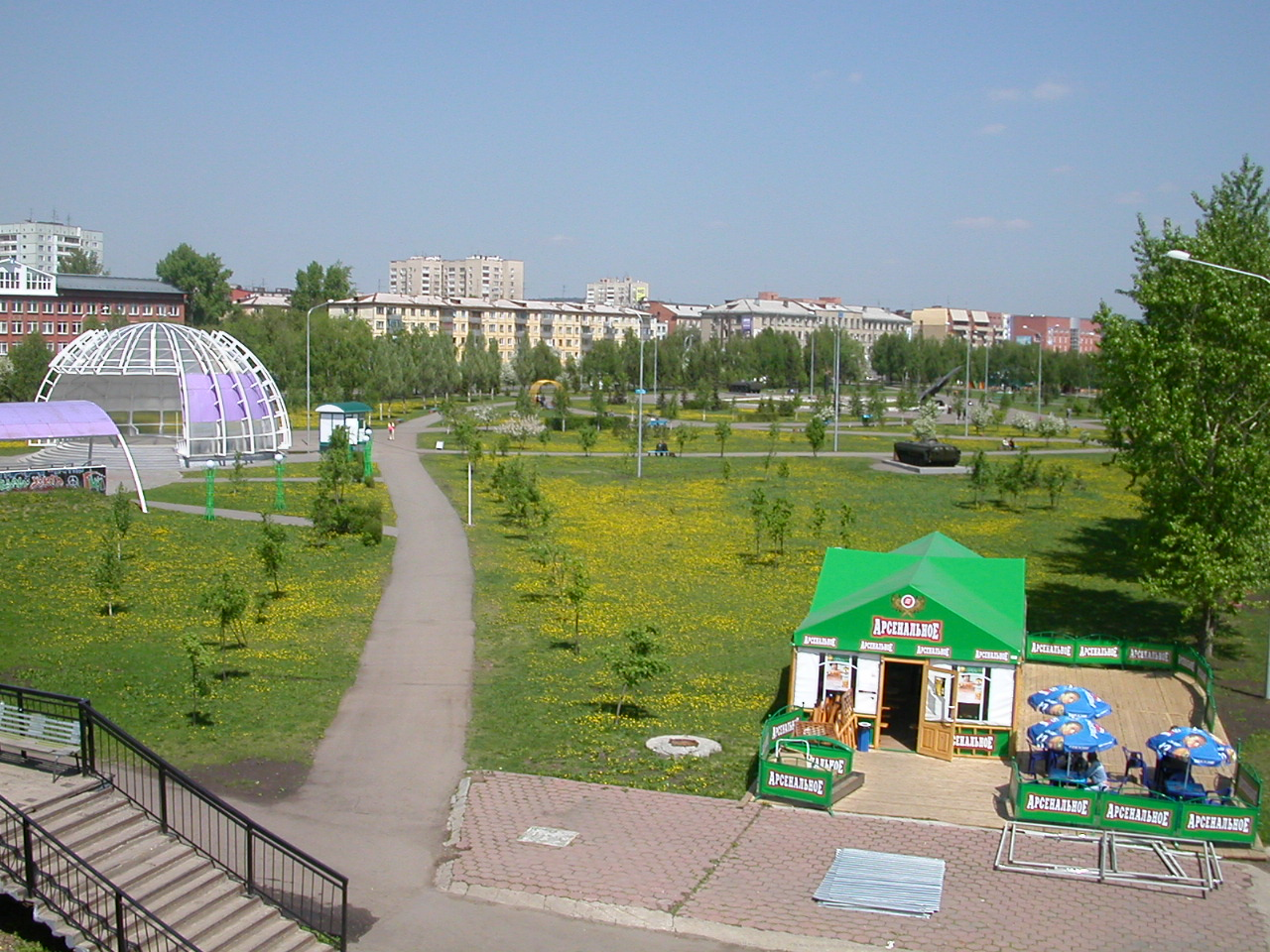
Victory Park (Парк Победы) or Zhukov's Park (Парк имени Жукова) in Kemerovo]

== See also ==
- Immaculate Heart of Mary Church, Kemerovo
