= Immaculate Heart of Mary School (Marche, Arkansas) =

- U.S. National Register of Historic Places
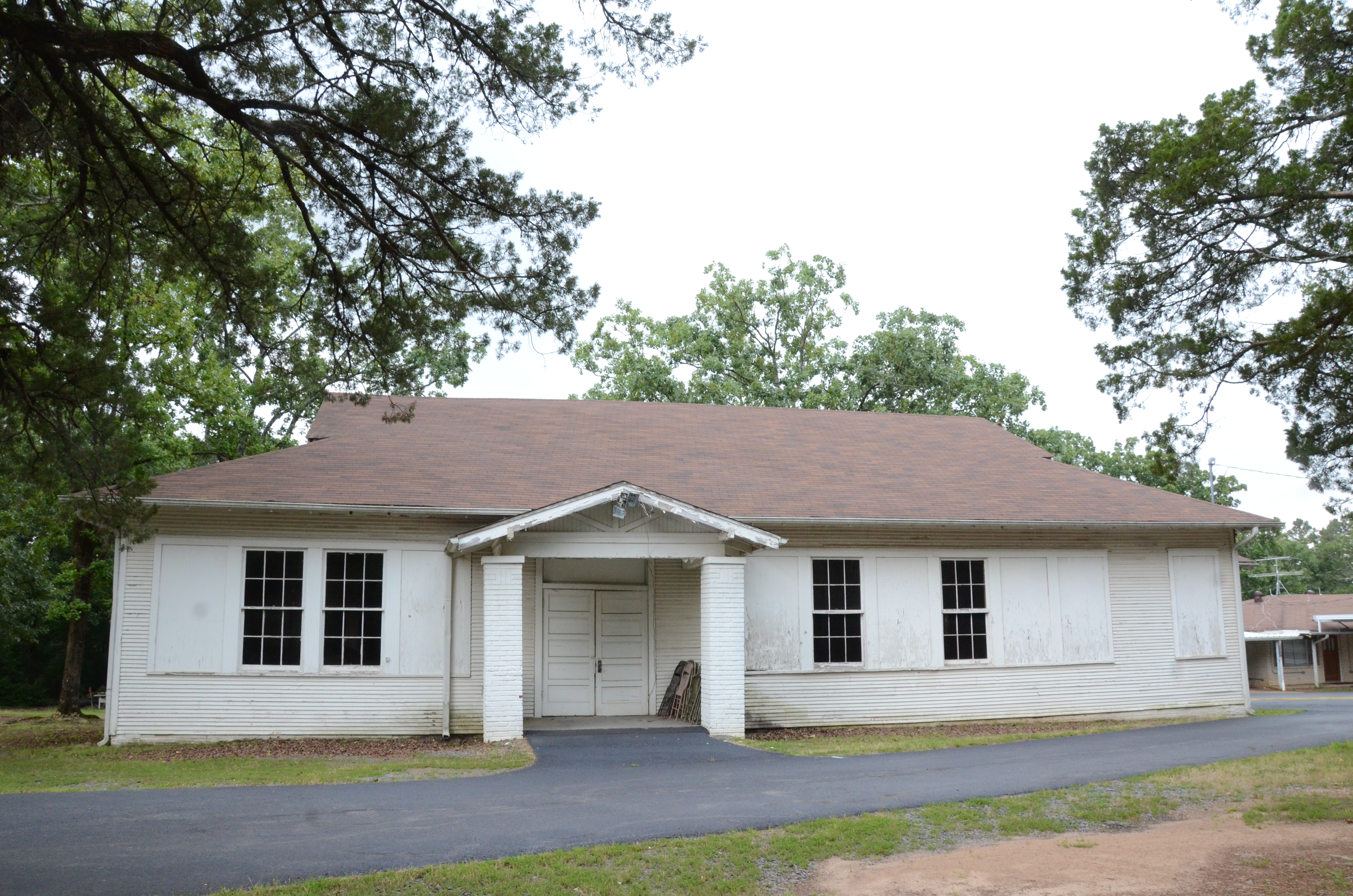

- Location within Arkansas Location within the United States
- Location: 7006 Jasna Gora Drive
- Nearest city: North Little Rock, Arkansas
- Coordinates: 34.8766°N 92.3407°W
- Area: less than one acre
- Built: 1925
- Architect: George Makowski
- Architectural style: Bungalow/craftsman
- NRHP reference No.: 93000965
- Added to NRHP: September 16, 1993

The Immaculate Heart of Mary School is a historic school building on the campus of the Immaculate Heart of Mary Church in northern Pulaski County, Arkansas. It is located off Arkansas Highway 365, north of North Little Rock and east of Marche. The building is a single-story wood-frame building with Craftsman styling. It has a gable-on-hip roof with a front porch supported by square brick columns, with false timbering applied over vertical boards in the gable end. The building was built in 1925 by the church's head carpenter, George Makowski.

The building was listed on the National Register of Historic Places in 1993 for its architectural significance.

== See also ==
- National Register of Historic Places listings in Pulaski County, Arkansas
