= Church of Immaculate Heart of Mary, Vinkovci =

Parish Church of Immaculate Heart of Mary
- Župna crkva Bezgrješnog Srca Marijina
- 45.289269°N 18.773019°E
- Location: A. Stepinca 73, Vinkovci
- Country: Croatia
- Denomination: Roman Catholic

History
- Status: Parish church

Architecture
- Functional status: Active
- Architect: Đuro Fuks
- Groundbreaking: 1973
- Completed: 1975

Administration
- Metropolis: Metropolis of Đakovo-Osijek
- Archdiocese: Archdiocese of Đakovo-Osijek
- Parish: Parish of Immaculate Heart of Mary - Vinkovci 3

The Church of Immaculate Heart of Mary (Croatian: Crkva Bezgrješnog Srca Marijina) is a Roman Catholic church in Vinkovci, Croatia.

== History ==
The church was built from 1973 till 1975.

It was damaged during the Croatian War of Independence, but later it was renovated.
