= Immaculate Heart of Mary College (disambiguation) =

Immaculate Heart of Mary College is a Catholic school in Quezon City, Metro Manila, Philippines.

Immaculate Heart of Mary College may also refer to:

- Immaculate Heart of Mary College, Portaceli, Spain
- Immaculate Heart of Mary College-Parañaque, Philippines

== See also ==
- Immaculate Heart College, Los Angeles, California
- Immaculate Heart of Mary School (disambiguation)
- Sacred Heart (disambiguation)
