= Immaculate Heart of Mary Church (North Little Rock, Arkansas) =

Historic church in Arkansas, United States

- U.S. National Register of Historic Places
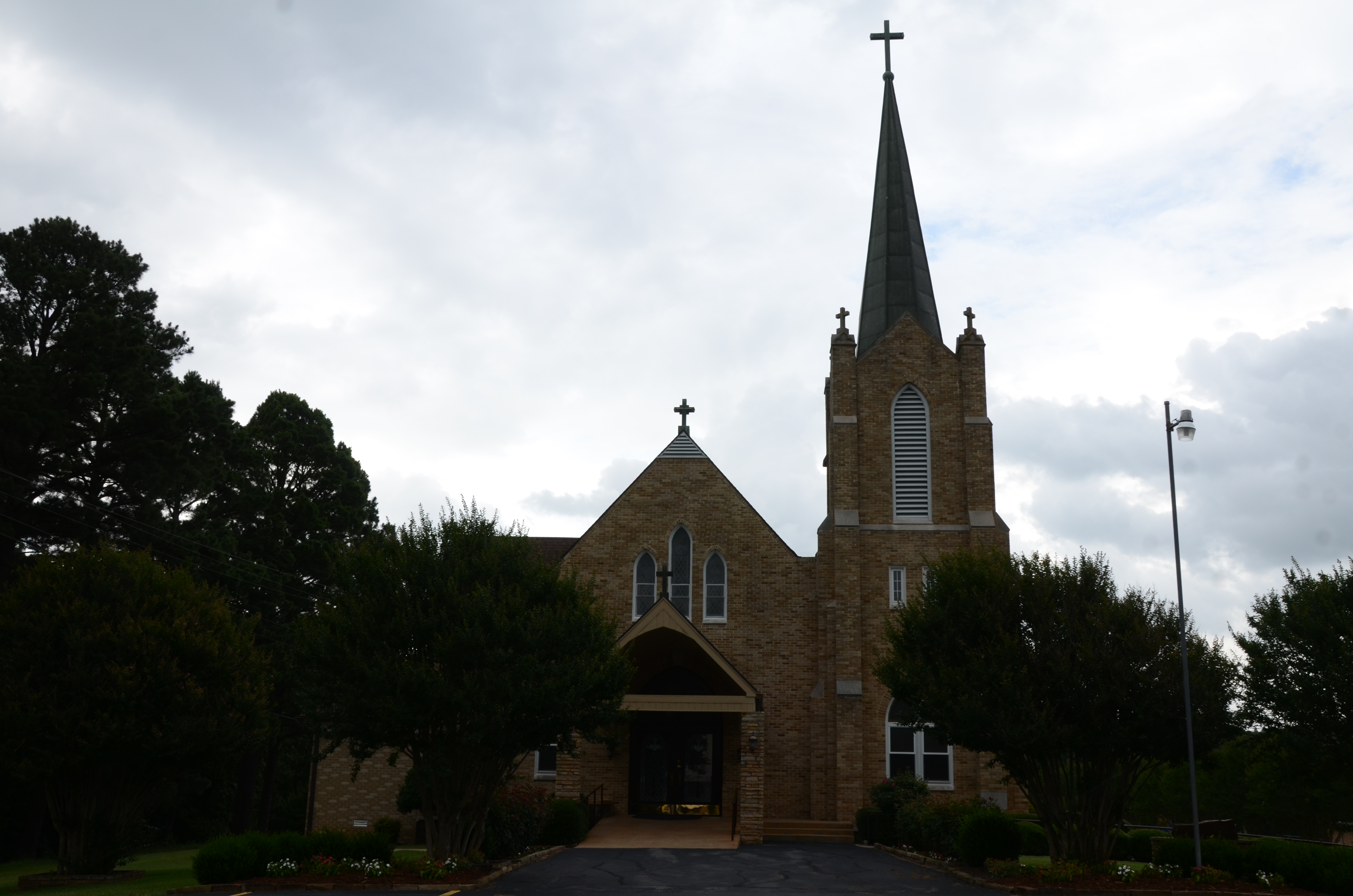

- Location within Arkansas Location within the United States
- Location: 7006 Jasna Gora Drive
- Nearest city: North Little Rock, Arkansas
- Coordinates: 34°52′36″N 92°20′32″W
- Area: less than one acre
- Built: 1932
- Architect: Thompson, Sanders & Ginocchio
- Architectural style: Late Gothic Revival
- Website: http://www.ihmnlr.org
- MPS: Thompson, Charles L., Design Collection TR
- NRHP reference No.: 82000901
- Added to NRHP: December 22, 1982

The Immaculate Heart of Mary Church is a historic Roman Catholic church in northern Pulaski County, Arkansas. It is located off Arkansas Highway 365 on Blue Hill (Jasna Gora) in Marche, north of North Little Rock.

== History ==
In 1878, Father Anthony Jaworski, a Polish priest from the Holy Ghost Fathers came to Marche. He led the efforts to establish a parish and build the first church. The first structure was a small wooden chapel built on a large hill. The new parish was named the Immaculate Heart of Mary and the hill was named Jasna Gora or "Blue Hill" after the shrine in Poland. In 1896, a larger church was built and served the parish until it was destroyed by fire. It was replaced by the current church building in 1932.

The current church building is a Gothic Revival structure, built out of brick on a stone foundation. It was designed by the noted Arkansas architect Charles L. Thompson, and was completed in 1932.

The church building was listed on the National Register of Historic Places in 1982.

== See also ==
- Immaculate Heart of Mary School (Marche, Arkansas)
- National Register of Historic Places listings in Pulaski County, Arkansas
