= St. John Chrysostom Church, Novokuznetsk =

Coordinates: 53.7806°N 87.3011°E

St. John Chrysostom Church
- храм Святого Иоанна Златоуста
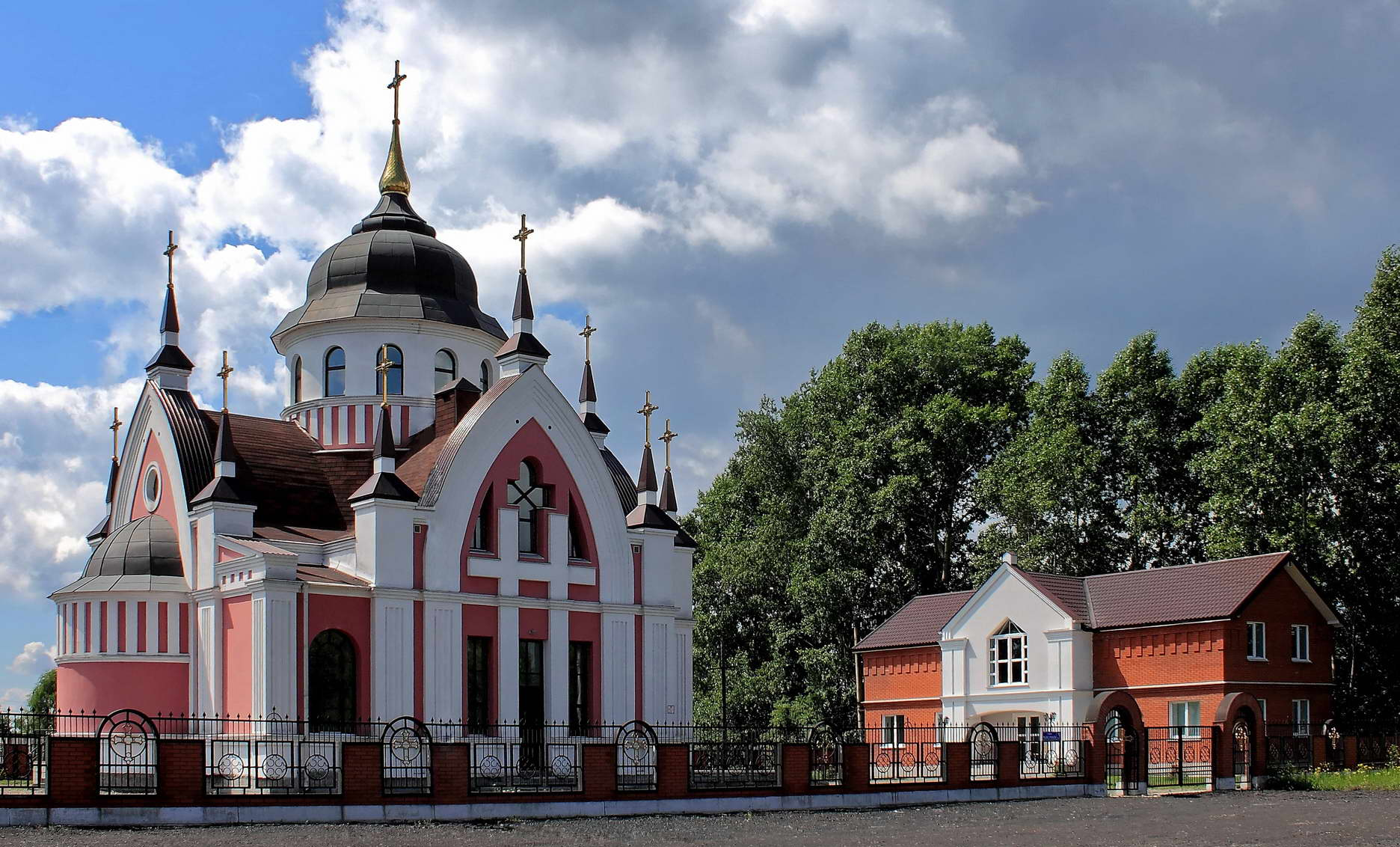
- St. John Chrysostom Church
- Location: Novokuznetsk
- Country: Russia
- Denomination: Catholic Church

Administration
- Diocese: Roman Catholic Diocese of the Transfiguration at Novosibirsk

St. John Chrysostom Church (Russian: храм Святого Иоанна Златоуста) is a Catholic church in Novokuznetsk in Russia.

== See also ==
- Catholic Church in Russia
- St. John Chrysostom Church
