= St. John Chrysostom's Church (Bronx) =

Catholic parish church in New York, US

Coordinates: 40°49′35.5″N 73°53′28″W

The Church of St. John Chrysostom

General information
- Architectural style: Romanesque Revival
- Location: Morrisania, The Bronx, New York City, United States
- Completed: 1900 (for church); 1913 (for church interior); 1913 (Shrine of Our Lady of Lourdes)
- Client: Roman Catholic Archdiocese of New York

Technical details
- Structural system: Masonry brick

St. John Chrysostom's Church is a Roman Catholic parish church under the authority of the Roman Catholic Archdiocese of New York, in the Morrisania section of the New York City borough of the Bronx.

== Parish history ==
The parish was established in 1899 for a mostly Irish immigrant congregation, breaking from the parish of St. Augustine by the Rev. Bernard F. Brady. At that time, the neighborhood had a large Jewish population from Russia, Bohemia and Poland. In 1913, "the Catholic population of the parish [was] about 1100, and the value of the church property [was] $180,000, with a debt of $72,000. A school is (1914) in process of construction.” Assistant priests in 1913 included the Rev. Joseph J. McAndrew and the Rev. James J. Halligan.

By the mid-twentieth century, the Irish, Italian, Polish and other Europeans who lived in the area made way for a new group of residents who were mostly Latino (from Puerto Rico and immigrants from the Dominican Republic), as well as African Americans. During the downturn of the South Bronx in the 1970s and 1980s, the area around the church was considered part of the 'Fort Apache' section of the South Bronx. Throughout the riots, the buildings surrounding St. John's burned and violence was at an all-time high. St. John's however, remained open and became a safe haven for children. It was often referred to as 'Little House on the Prairie.'"

Anthrax victim Kathy T. Nguyen had her funeral at St. John Chrysostom Roman Catholic Church on November 5, 2001. “Nguyen, a native of Vietnam, died of inhalation anthrax in New York on October 31.” Also, the funeral of NYPD Officer Daniel Enchautegui of the 40th Precinct in the South Bronx was held in this church, presided over by Cardinal Edward M. Egan. During the service, Mayor Michael Bloomberg posthumously promoted the officer to the rank of detective first-grade. The current pastor of St. John Chrysostom Church is Rev. Richard Marrano.

== Description ==
The double-height-over-sunken-basement brick twin-towered church with stone trim was built at 985 East 167th Street and Hoe Avenue in 1900. The church front elevation is symmetrically divided into three parts and consists of a nave with six-bay clerestory flanked to both sides by six-bay lean-to aisles, which terminate in the bookended square-in-plan single-bay four-stage towers, projecting a bay in depth to flank the gabled three-bay façade of the nave. The central gabled façade has three equal round-headed entrance openings addressed by a flight of stone steps spanning between the towers.

Pitched nave roof with pyramidal copper roofs with cross finials to towers. Walling has reddish-yellow-brick over rusticated stone splayed plinth/basement walling and a corbelled-stone-over-round-headed-arcade-band of brick. Openings all are round-headed with moulded stone architraves and reveals, some with stop-block-labeled hoodmoulds, except basement openings are openings, which are pointed-arched.

Gabled center of main façade has blind stone arcade to mid-height; entrance openings flanked with moulded responds and continuous imposts continued through entrance opening as transoms, with double-leaf timber paneled doors. Stained-glass tympanum overlights to entrances; gable apex features stained-glass rose window; copper cross finial above. Each exposed tower elevation has single window with hood to first stage; bipartite window with hood to second stage; blind oculus to third stage; and tripartite with hood and painted timber louvers to (belfry) fourth stage, which is above cornice level and has slightly setback corners.

The seven-bay four-story orange brick schoolhouse with stone trim was built 1914. Main façade is detailed with central three-bay breakfront that to ground floor is accentuated in four-centre-arched stone entrances. Ground-floor is double-height and defined from rest of structure with separating stone stringcourse and second floor sillcourse. A modillioned cornice conceals its roof. Windows are square-headed bipartite timber sashes with stone sills and lintels.

== St. John Chrysostom's School ==
The parish also operates a Catholic grammar school at 1144 Hoe Ave, diagonally across Hoe avenue and 167th Street, and adjacent to the church's rectory. The Dominican Sisters of Sparkill have staffed the parish school since its opening in 1914. In the 1940s, enrollment was over a thousand. Presently, the school has around 600 students with approximately two sections per grade.
