= Church of the Immaculate Heart of Mary (Scarsdale, New York) =

Catholic church in Scarsdale, New York

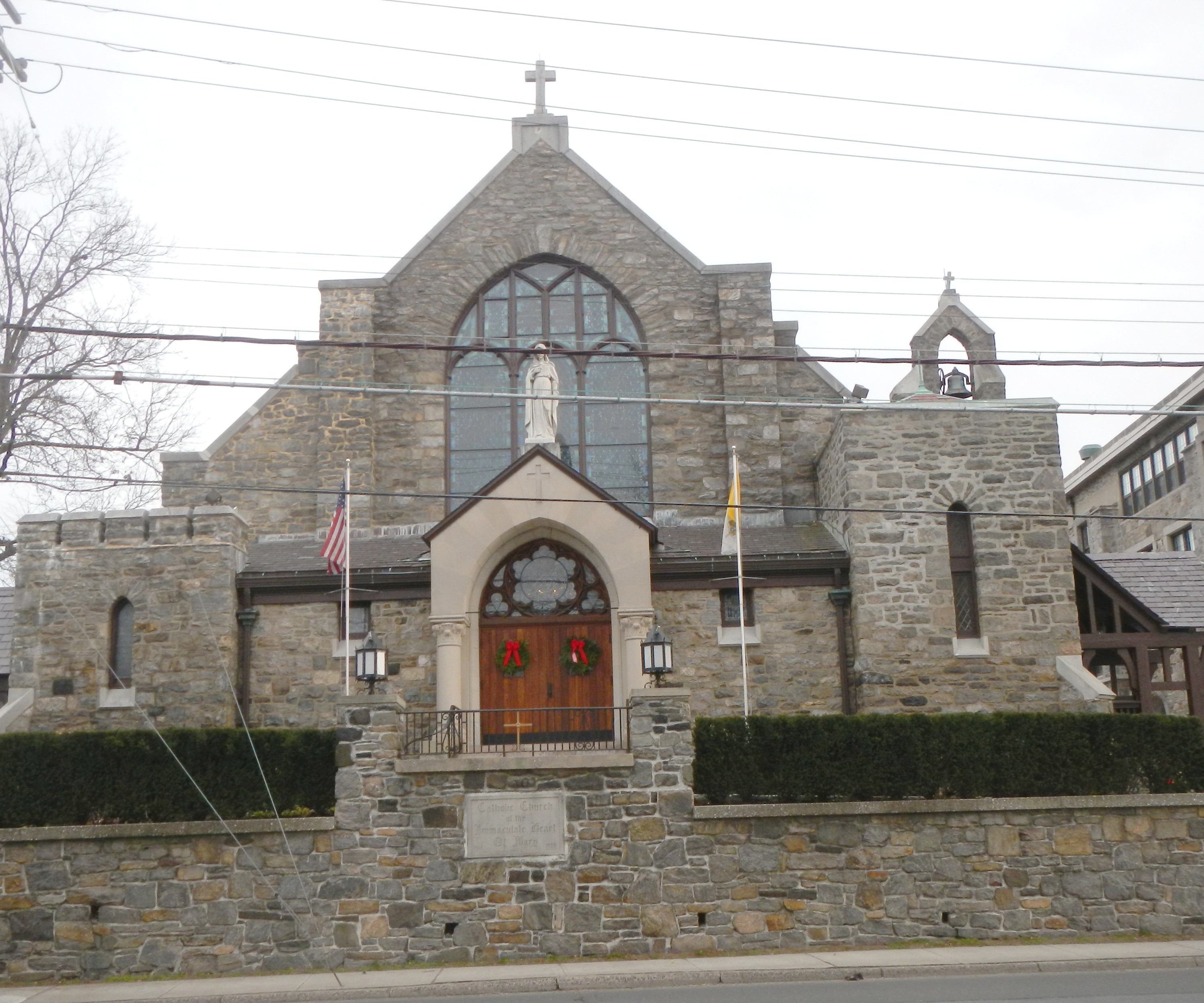
- Front of the church on White Plains Post Road
- Church of the Immaculate Heart of Mary
- 40°58′54″N 73°47′57″W
- Location: Scarsdale, New York
- Denomination: Catholic Church
- Website: ihm-parish.org

History
- Status: Parish church
- Founded: 1912
- Dedication: Immaculate Heart of Mary

Architecture
- Style: English Gothic
- Groundbreaking: August 1913

Administration
- Archdiocese: Archdiocese of New York

The Church of the Immaculate Heart of Mary is a Roman Catholic church located in Scarsdale, New York. Having been founded as a parish for Catholics in the village in 1912, the present English Gothic church was constructed in 1913.

== History ==
Prior to Church of the Immaculate Heart of Mary's founding, Catholics in Scarsdale traveled to the Church of St. John the Evangelist in White Plains. In 1912, the 39 Catholic families of Scarsdale petitioned the Archbishop of New York, Cardinal John Murphy Farley, to create a new parish in the village. Their request was granted, and the parish was established on December 20, 1912. The first mass was celebrated at a firehouse on Sprague Road, which was used as the temporary home for the parish, on January 5, 1913. Construction on the present English Gothic church begin in August 1913, and when the debt from its construction was paid off, the parish established a parochial school.

In the 1940s, the parish constructed Our Lady's Chapel as an addition to the church; while originally hosting daily masses, the chapel was transformed for perpetual Eucharistic adoration.

=== School ===
The cornerstone of the school building was laid on December 11, 1927, and the it came to accommodate nine classrooms, a library, auditorium, and gymnasium. The Immaculate Heart of Mary School, staffed by the Sisters of Charity, opened for its first 100 students on September 10, 1928. It was dedicated by Cardinal Patrick Joseph Hayes, who was led in a procession from the Scarsdale Train Station to the school. The Sisters of Charity continued to teach at the school until 1967, when the Dominican Sisters of Sparkill assumed their work. In 1972, this order was succeeded by a lay administration, making Immaculate Heart of Mary the first lay-administered school in the Archdiocese of New York.

== See also ==
- List of churches in the Roman Catholic Archdiocese of New York
