= Immaculate Heart of Mary School (Winnipeg) =

Ukrainian catholic school in Winnipeg, Manitoba

Coordinates: 49.9166°N 97.1520°W

The Immaculate Heart of Mary School (IHMS) is a kindergarten-to-grade-eight Ukrainian Catholic school in the north end of Winnipeg, Manitoba, Canada.

It is owned and operated by the Sisters, Servants of Mary Immaculate (not to be confused with the Sisters, Servants of the Immaculate Heart of Mary, an entirely different and unrelated religious order). IHMS is also a part of the Ukrainian Catholic Archeparchy of Winnipeg and the Catholic Schools' Commission of the Roman Catholic Archdiocese of Saint Boniface. The school offers a Christian-based education, a strong extracurricular athletic program, and a musical performing arts program, all of which is tied to Ukrainian culture.

== History ==
Immaculate Heart of Mary School is the only independent Ukrainian Catholic school in Manitoba. It began its existence in 1905 as St. Nicholas School due to its affiliation with the Catholic Church of the same name. By 1906 it had moved into the basement of St. Nicholas Church. Then, in 1911, Archbishop Langevin, Archbishop of St. Boniface, supplied the funds for a new building to be built at 650 Flora Avenue in Winnipeg. Through the years that followed, St. Nicholas School served the Ukrainian people in the Winnipeg area until a new building was constructed in 1962–63. On April 28, 1963, the present school was officially opened and the name was changed from "St. Nicholas" to Immaculate Heart of Mary School Inc. with the hope of making it less parochial and more citywide. In January 2008, a new seven acre parcel of land was purchased on Ferrier Street in north Winnipeg for a new school to be constructed to serve the Ukrainian and other communities well into the future.
