= British Columbia Electric Railway =

Defunct passenger rail service

- BC Electric
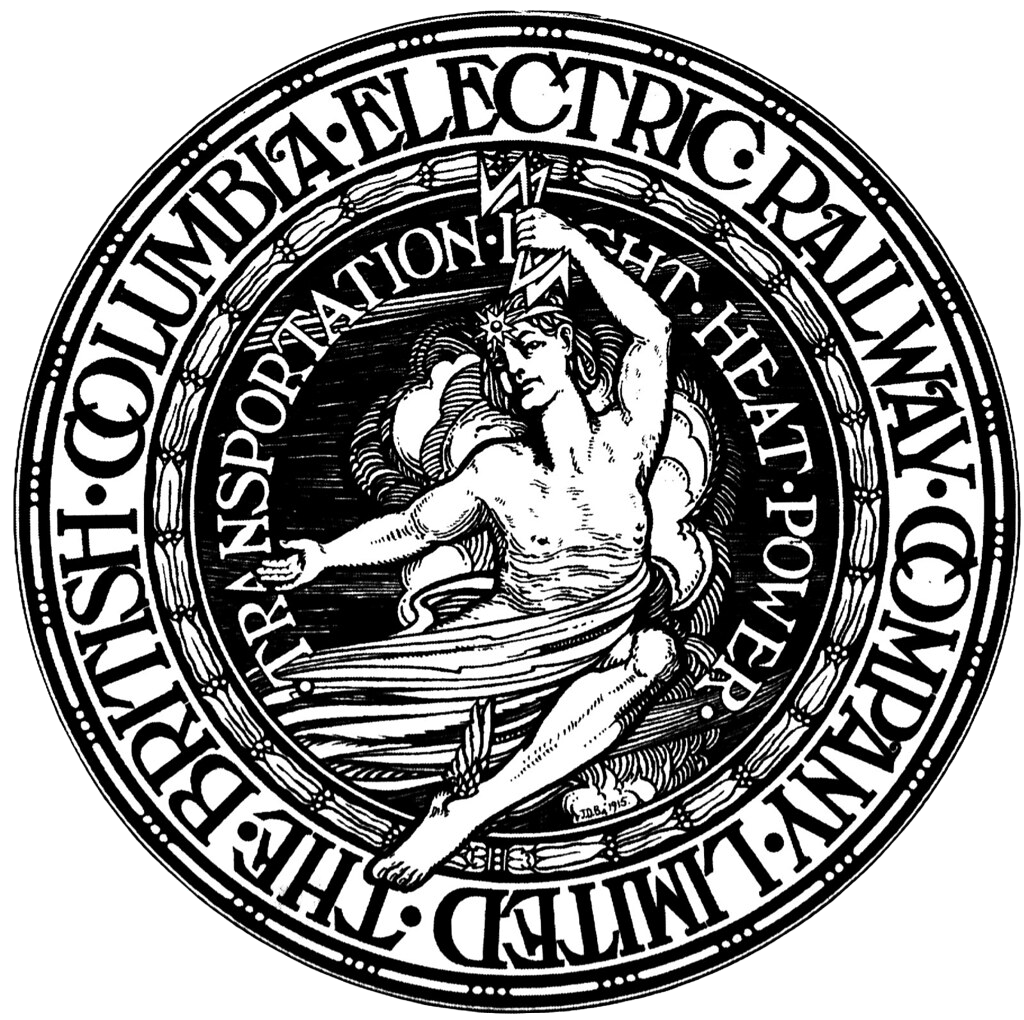

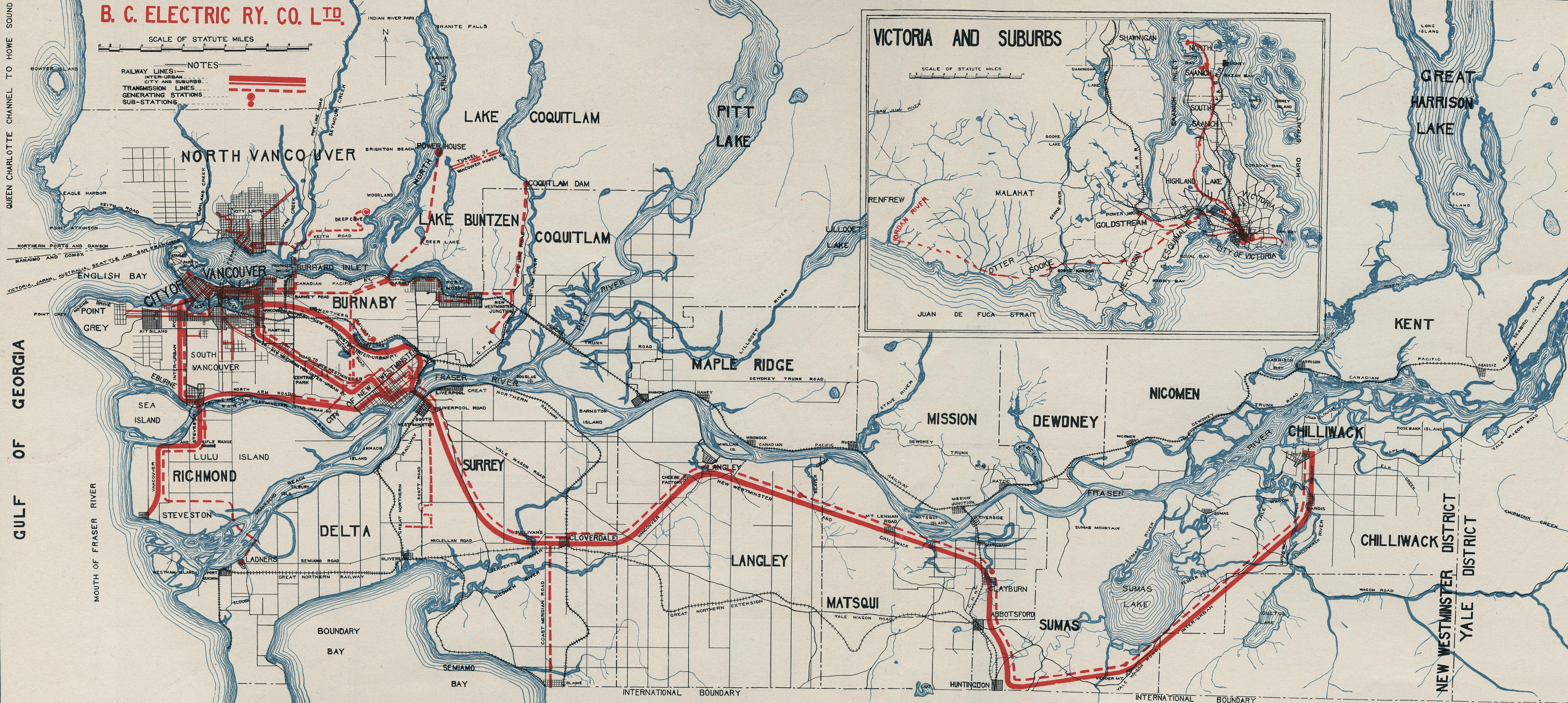
- BCER system map in 1912, showing interurban and city routes alongside transmission lines.

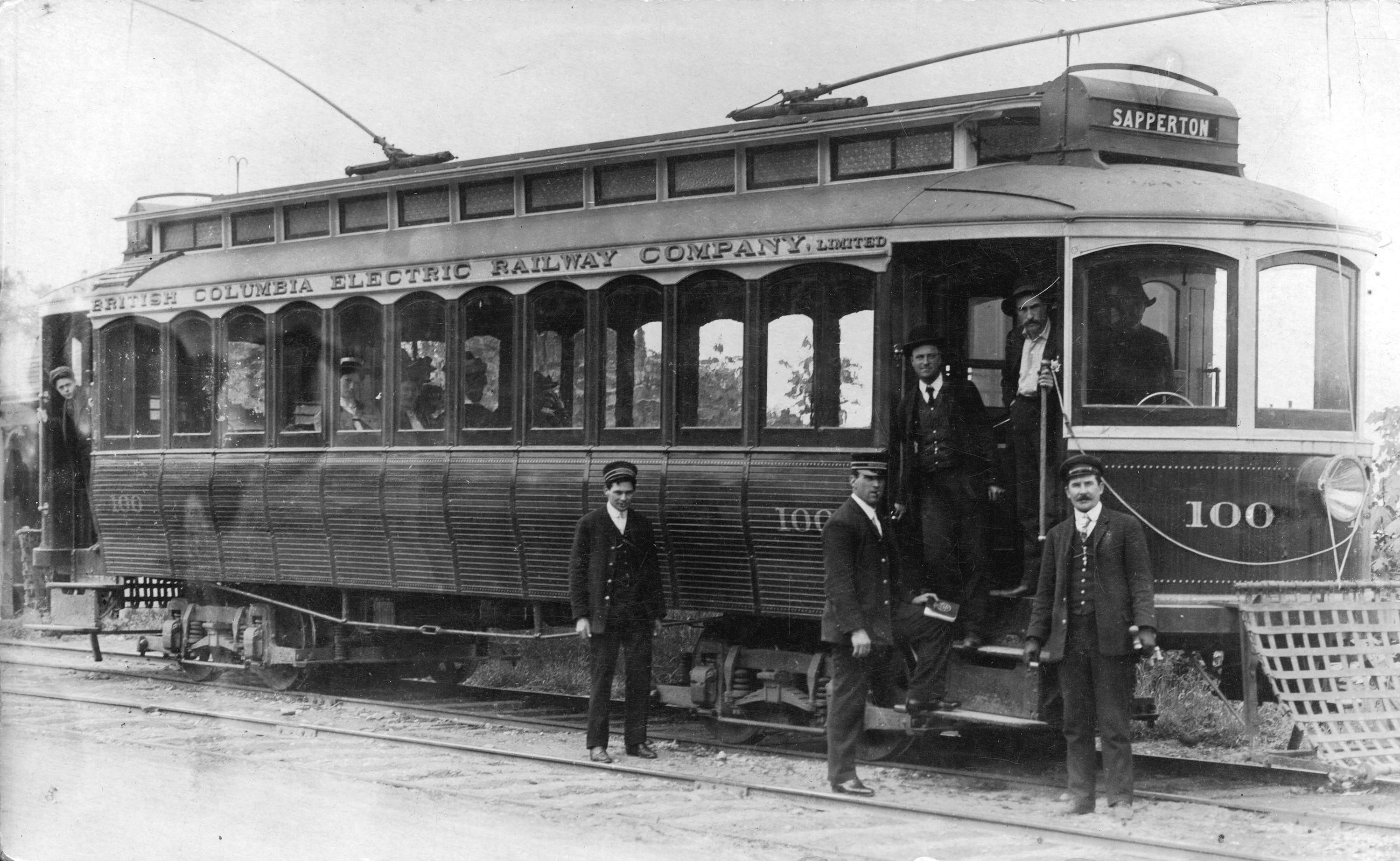
- BCER Sapperton line streetcar, 1908.

Overview
- Headquarters: London, Vancouver
- Locale: Southwestern British Columbia
- Dates of operation: 1897–1979
- Predecessors: National Electric Tramway and Lighting Company Limited (1890); Vancouver Electric Railway and Light Company Limited (1890); Westminster and Vancouver Tramway Company (1891); Consolidated Railway and Light Company (1895)
- Successors: BC Hydro, BC Transit, Southern Railway of British Columbia, TransLink

Technical
- Track gauge: 4 ft 8 1/2 in (1,435 mm) standard gauge

The British Columbia Electric Railway (BCER) was a historic railway which operated in southwestern British Columbia, Canada. Originally the parent company for, and later a division of, BC Electric Company (BCE), the BCER assumed control of existing streetcar and interurban lines in southwestern British Columbia in 1897, and operated the electric railway systems in the region until the last interurban service was discontinued in 1958. During and after the streetcar era, BC Electric also acted as the province's primary electric utility operator and offered gas heating. Power was largely generated via hydroelectricity, which remains the primary source of electricity in the province.

During and after the streetcar era, the company also ran bus and trolleybus systems in Greater Vancouver and bus service in Greater Victoria. In 1944, the company announced their "Rails-to-Rubber" program which saw the existing streetcar systems dismantled and lines converted fully to bus routes.

In 1961, the province took control of BC Electric and these systems came under the control of Crown corporation BC Hydro and Power Authority. BC Hydro continued to operate the existing bus routes for a number of years, until the routes became part of BC Transit, with routes in Greater Vancouver eventually coming under the control of TransLink. Trolley buses continue to run in Vancouver with one line extending into Burnaby.

== Predecessors ==
=== National Electric Tramway and Lighting Company (1889 - 1895) ===
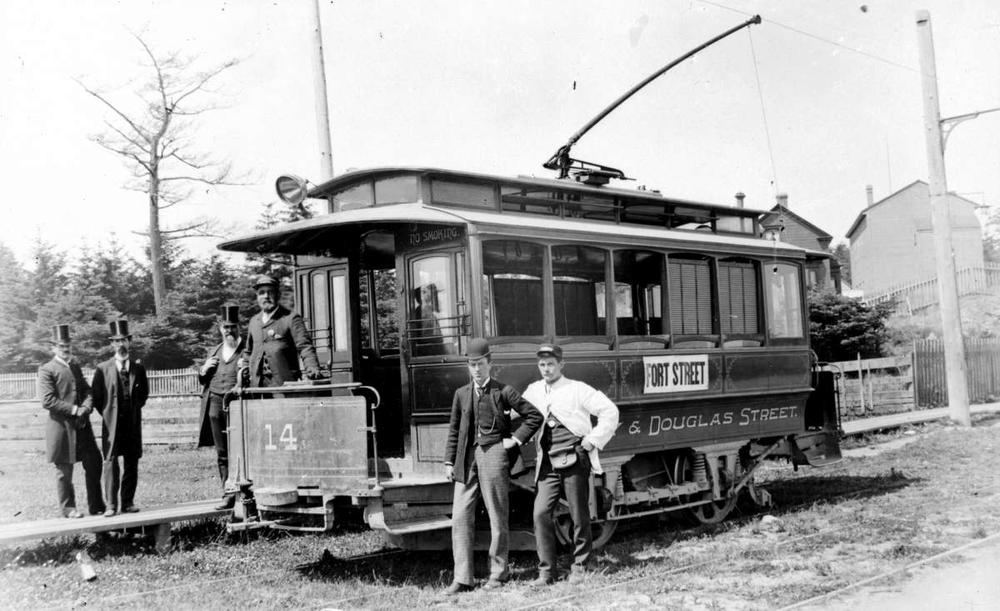
Fort Street streetcar, No. 14, National Electric Tramway and Lighting Co., 1892.

On April 6, 1889, the National Electric Tramway and Lighting Company (NETL) was formed by a Legislative Act with construction on the initial line beginning on October 1 of that year. On February 22, 1890, the NETL launched streetcar service in Victoria, beginning the first streetcar service in BC. Two lines were constructed at launch. The Outer Wharf line ran from the intersection of Douglas, Government, and Hillside streets, south on Douglas St. before going west toward the outer wharf area. The Fort Street line ran from the Rock Bay Bridge at the north end of Store St, and ran south before turning east to reach the site of the future Royal Jubilee Hospital. Construction on the company's car barn and power plant began on September 2, and was located west of Store St at the Rock Bay Bridge. Victoria's streetcar system was the first in Canada to operate west of Windsor and St. Catharines, with the system's cars being manufactured in St. Catharines by Patterson & Corbin. At launch, the NETL had an agreement with the city of Victoria to run streetcars at a speed limit of 10 mph.

Prior to the official launch, a test run commenced on February 20 with Mayor John Grant and company president D.W. Higgins in attendance. The initial run went from the company's car barn to James Bay. At the time, the line had 4-miles of track completed and four streetcars had been delivered. The ceremonial launch of service on February 22 was attended by two hundred invited guests, including BC's Premier John Robson, Lieutenant Governor Hugh Nelson, Mayor Grant, president Higgins, Victoria city council members and Members of the Legislative Assembly. The event included champagne toasts and singing of "God Save the Queen". Passengers loaded onto cars 1 through 4 for a ceremonial first trip. The trip went through the entirety of the five-mile system. Regular service started on February 23 with a fare of five-cents. The service proved to be quite popular, with the company announcing on April 8, 1890, plans to expand their power house and machinery.

The company was authorized by the provincial government on April 26, 1890, to further operate in Saanich, Highlands, Esquimalt, Sooke, and Metchosin. On September 13, the Esquimalt extension was completed. The first ceremonial trip to Esquimalt on the line took place on October 9, running from the car barn and back in twenty-five minutes. Regular service began on the line on October 12. Service ran hourly and cost twenty-five cents for a return ticket. After realizing that the Rock Bay Bridge the streetcars ran on to reach Esquimalt could not handle the weight of the vehicles, the bridge was closed to streetcars for reinforcement on October 24. While being reinforced, passengers on the line would disembark upon reaching the bridge and walk across to a streetcar on the other side that would continue along the remainder of the line. The Rock Bay Bridge was re-opened to streetcras on November 14. Cars on the three lines were painted to indicate their lines, with Esquimalt line cars being painted green, Outer Wharf cars blue and white, and Fort Street cars painted red. By the end of 1890, the NETL added five more streetcars to its service, for a total of nine across its three lines.

The NETL continued to expand in 1891, opening new power plants in January and purchasing six more streetcars over the course of the year. The company was hopeful that the power plants would enable them to run twenty streetcars on a ten-minute headway. In March, service on the Esquimalt line increased to every half-hour, and construction began on a new 1.3 mile line in neighbouring Oak Bay, running east toward Oak Bay beach. The line officially opened on July 1 as a shuttle service. On September 26, the Driving Park extension opened in Oak Bay, running from Jubilee Hospital toward the park (now known as Willows Park). The Pandora Avenue extension opened in Victoria on December 23, running east from Douglas Street toward Fernwood Road. The line had a track length of 1.13 miles. 1891 was a financially successful year for the NETL, with profits over $18,000. The company also received a loan of $100,000 from Olive Dunsmuir, widow of Robert Dunsmuir.

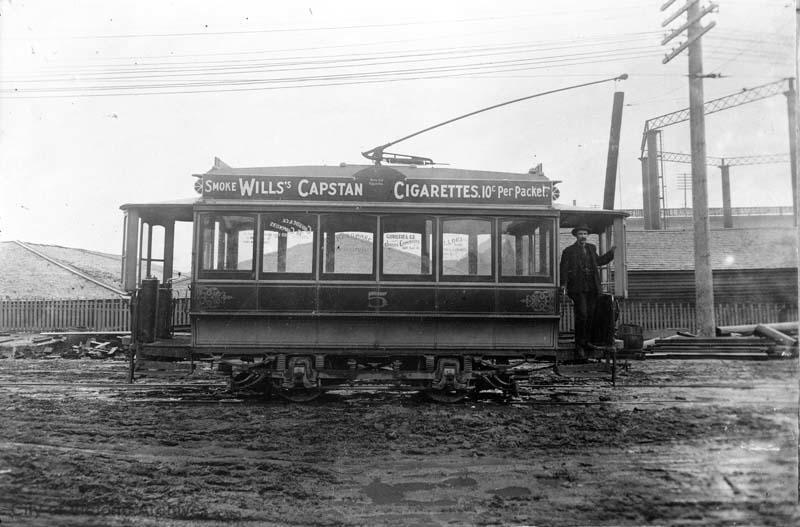
National Electric Tramway and Lighting Co. no. 5 streetcar at the end of Store Street, 1890.

1892 saw several new lines constructed. A northern extension of Douglas Street from Hilside to Tolmie Avenue launched as a shuttle service on March 12, but was improved on May 14 when the extension became part of the Outer Wharf line. A new line to Beacon Hill Park launched on June 30, as part of the Pandora-Beacon Hill line. This would be the last line to be constructed in Victoria for eleven years. In June to July service on the Esquimalt line was reduced to shuttle service as rotting wood on the Point Ellice Bridge had caused the structure to sink by several feet. One additional streetcar was purchased in 1892. On August 7, a fire broke out in the company's repair room and destroyed the room along with the NETL's power house. Streetcars in the next door carbarn were undamaged, and work began to construct a new powerhouse began immediately. Before streetcar service resumed in September, the NETL allowed the Jockey Club to borrow two cars for three days for use as horse-drawn vehicles to bring customers to horse track races. After the company borrowed two Edison generators from the Westminster and Vancouver Tramway, service resumed on September 24. Full streetcar service was finally restored months later on December 6.

On April 6, 1894, the company had its name changed by a provincial legislative act to the Victoria Electric Railway and Lighting Company Limited. On June 4, 1895, the company went into receivership.

=== Vancouver Electric Street Railway and Lighting Company (1889 - 1895) ===
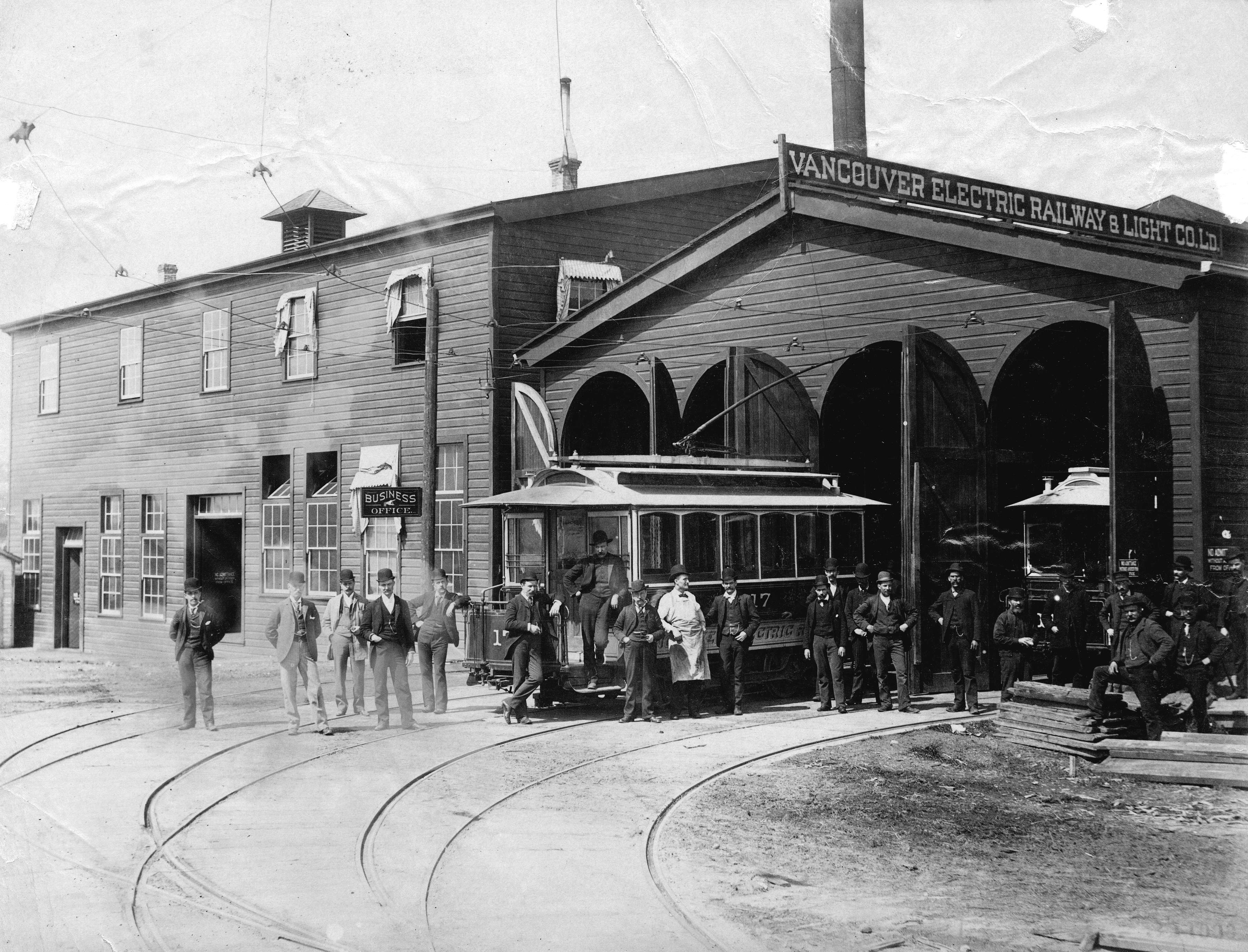
The Vancouver Electric Railway and Light Company car barn and power house c. 1892

In 1888, the Vancouver Street Railway company formed and was authorized by Vancouver City Council to construct and operate streetcars. The company began construction on the preliminary lines, which were planned to be horse-drawn. Pressure from city council and the public convinced the company to go with electric rail instead. The decision was announced on August 9, 1889, only six days before the system was set to launch, resulting in a ten-month service delay. When the decision was made, existing streetcars were equipped with motors so they could run on electricity. The system's initial line was ready to handle streetcars on August 15, 1889, but it wasn't until June of the next year that streetcars would begin to operate. Prior to making the decision, a large horse stable was constructed on the south of False Creek. The horses had been purchased and arrived, and the stables stayed in place for nearly fifty years. The electricity to power the system was generated at a steam power plant beside the company's car barn.

On May 21, 1890, the Vancouver Street Railway company merged with the Vancouver Electric Light company to form the Vancouver Electric Street Railway and Lighting Company (VESRL). Also in May, the company received six streetcars purchased from the John Stephenson Car Company. A trial run of streetcar number 14 ran on June 26, 1890, four months after trams launched in Victoria. The car made several trips along Westminster Avenue in the afternoon, before being tested on the rest of the system's tracks in the evening. The first six miles of the line were opened to the public on June 27, 1890. Two lines were in operation at the start of service. The Powell Street line ran west on Powell Street to Granville and Pender streets. The Westminster Avenue line ran north on Main to Powell Street, passing the horse stable, crossing False Creek on a newly built bridge, passing the car barn on Union Street. The line then met the same westward route of the Powell Street line but continued for an additional mile south.The service began in Vancouver's then-commercial district, linking the perimeters of the east and west residential districts. Residents along the route were among the first in the city to receive running water, sewage, and electricity. On July 3, 1890, the VESRL revealed new arc lights, illuminating Vancouver's streets at night for the first time.

At rush hour, six cars operated across the whole system. These cars had the capability to run at speeds up to 32 km/h (20 mph), but due to an agreement with the city only operated at 9.6 km/h (6.0 mph). The Vancouver Electric Street Railway and Lighting company also gave the city of Vancouver the option to buy the streetcar system after 30 years. On October 11, 1890, crews began constructing a half-mile extension of the railway to reach Mount Pleasant. By February 1891, Vancouver's six streetcars had carried nearly 340,000 total passengers.

On October 22, 1891, the company launched the Fairview line. The VESRL purchased 68 lots of land in the area from the Canadian Pacific Railway in exchange for streetcar service in the area. The line was single-tracked and ran 4.4 km at opening, crossing False Creek to Granville Street, and connecting with the recently opened Mount Pleasant extension. People saw the line as a disappointment due to how few residents lived in the Fairview area at the time. The construction of the Fairview line would exceed 5x its original estimate, as the line needed to cross multiple streams, seven wood bridges were constructed at a cost of $150,000.

In 1892, a smallpox epidemic hit Vancouver and the entire transit system shutdown for nearly two months due to a lack of ridership. At the end of 1892, the Vancouver Electric Street Railway and Lighting Company was losing almost $1,300 a month on both transit and lighting operations. At this time, the Vancouver city council declined two separate offers to buy the company. By February 1893, the company went into liquidation and was taken over by a board of trustees who hoped to make the system profitable by cutting service. They reduced service frequency in Mount Pleasant and completely closed the Fairview line as well as service east of Westminster Avenue. From 1893 to April 1894 transit service was entirely suspended. By 1895 the trustees were able to successfully borrow funds which allowed them to expand Vancouver's streetcar system, adding new lines and double-tracking existing ones. The system continued to expand until the company went into liquidation a few years later.

=== Westminster and Vancouver Tramway Company (1890 - 1894) ===
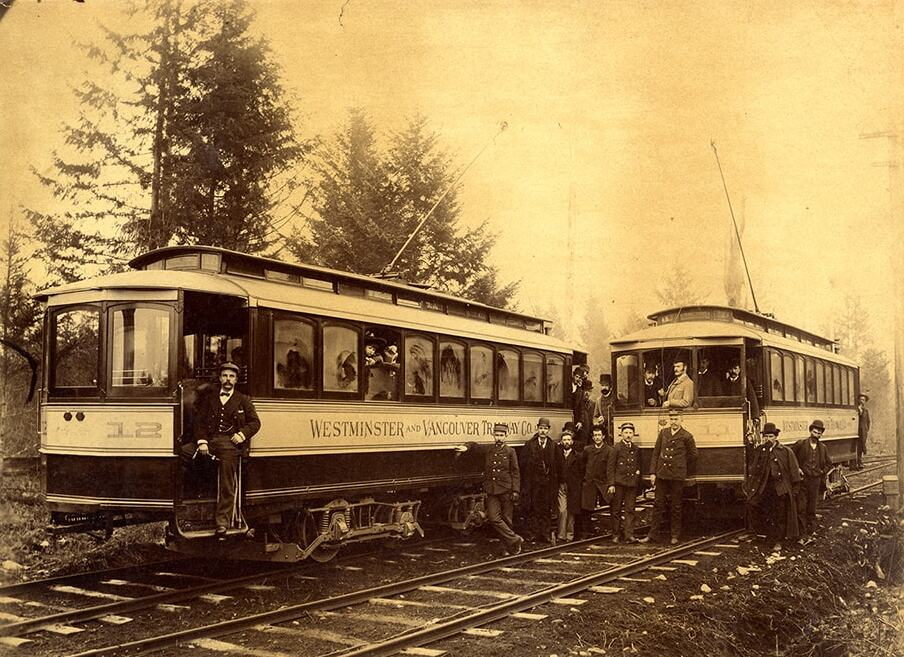
Two streetcars at the Central Park siding of Westminster and Vancouver Tramway Co. c. 1891-1894

On March 13, 1890, the city of New Westminster passed a bylaw giving the Westminster Street Railway Company permission to build and run streetcar lines in the city. On April 26, 1890, the BC legislature passed two railway charters to fund two companies, the Westminster Street Railway Company, who were to work on creating streetcars in New Westminster, and the Westminster and Vancouver Tramway Company, which would be tasked with creating an interurban railway between the two cities. The Westminster Street Railway Company was authorized to construct systems up to five miles outside the limits of the city which were unorganized territory at the time, and was capitalized with $250,000. The New Westminster city council authorized the streetcars to run at a speed limit of 6 mph. The Westminster and Vancouver Tramway Company capitalized at $500,000.

On April 20, 1891, Vancouver mayor David Oppenheimer and other wealthy business partners amalgamated the two existing companies into the Westminster and Vancouver Tramway Company. After amalgamating the two companies, it was decided that the city's first streetcar line should also serve as the entrance to the city via the interurban, while also serving the city's residential area and the popular Queen's Park. The system's first depot was constructed at the southwest corner of Columbia and 6th streets, where the line would run east on Columbia before going west toward Vancouver after climbing a steep grade. On October 8, 1891, the company launched New Westminster's streetcar system.

Construction on the system's first interurban line, the Central Park line, began on August 1, 1890. Grading of the interurban line began on December 17, 1890. Service began on a portion of the line on June 3, 1891 running short of Cedar Cottage, twice daily. The first run to reach Cedar Cottage occurred on September 2, and on October 1 the line had officially reached the boundary of Vancouver. The Central Park interurban line launched on October 28, 1891, with four cars running daily in each direction. The system was the first electric interurban line in North America, running from Vancouver–New Westminster via Central Park in Burnaby. Central Park, and thus, the Central Park Line, were named to honour Oppenheimer's wife, who was from New York City. To connect the cities, trestles had to be constructed through swamps and forests, with the longest trestle being 26 meters high and 36.5 meters long. The company convinced land owners along the route to donate land to the company, and the BC government made a land granting match of 196 acres north of the interurban route. Two of the company's directors collectively owned thousands of acres of land along the route. In Vancouver, the Vancouver Electric Railway and Light Company agreed to build the portion of the line from Cedar Cottage to Carrol Street, which they could operate streetcars on. At the launch of the line, there were two round-trip journeys per day at a cost of 50-cents for one-way tickets, or 75-cents for return. The 22.9 km line effectively doubled the total track mileage for public transit in Canada, and was also the longest interurban line in the country at the time. The line was initially quite popular, with the News-Advertiser writing that the cars were "packed on every trip both ways to and from Vancouver". The company also had an agreement with the Great Northern Railway to transport passengers and luggage between New West and Vancouver along the interurban line.

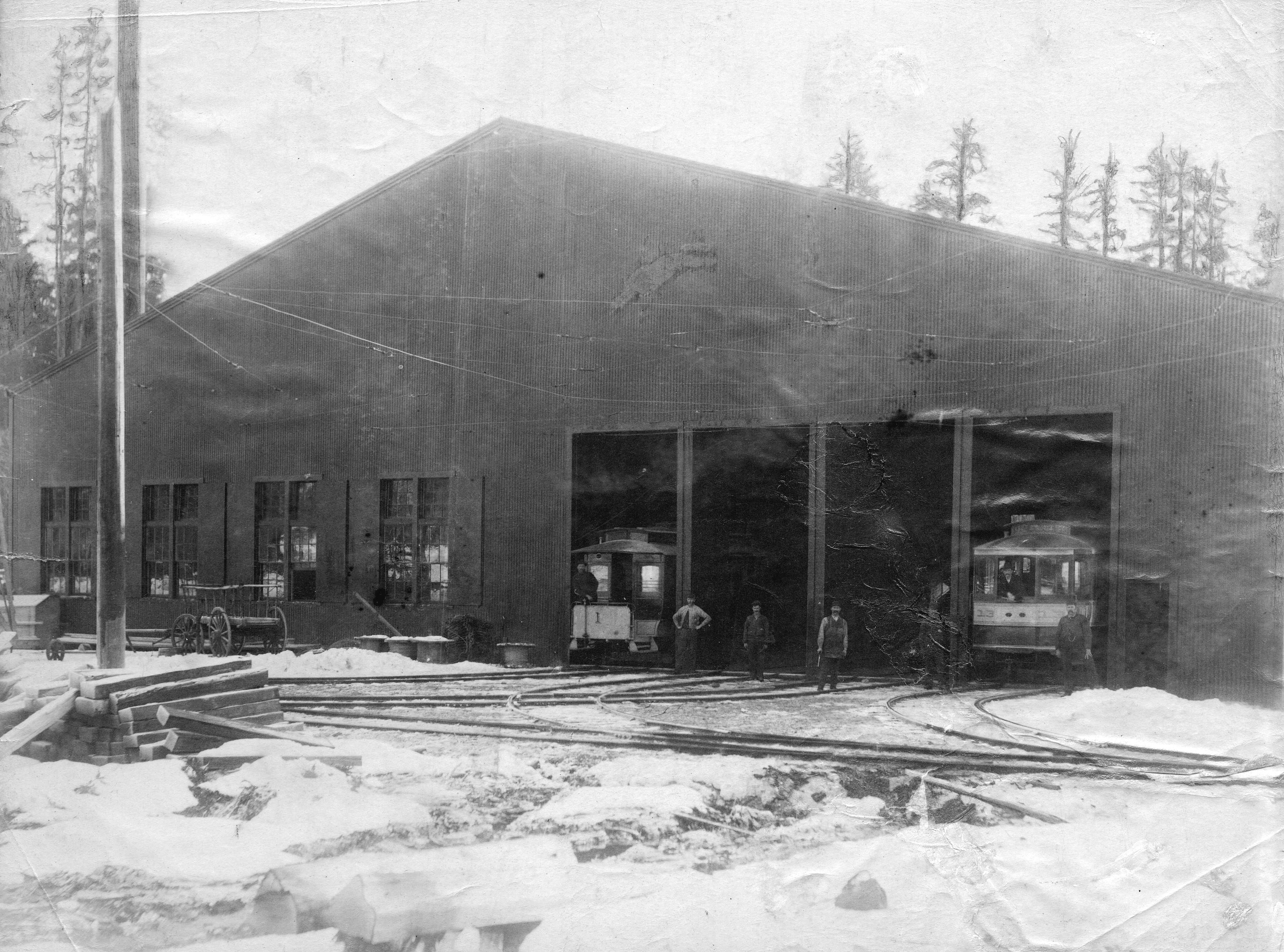
Power house of the Vancouver and Westminster Tramway Company Limited c. 1893.

The interurban service had three-stops, and the trip took 50-minutes to travel between Vancouver and New Westminster. The first stop was on Venables Street and Glen Drive in Vancouver, the second at Central Park, and the final stop was at the Westminster and Vancouver Tramways power plant. The stop in Central Park provided Burnaby residents with public transit for the first time, as they previously relied entirely on horse-drawn stagecoaches. Near the power plant, the company built a boarding room which housed 30 engineers, brakemen, mechanics, and station staff. Cottages were available for married staff to live in with their families.

The company suffered several blows during its operation. A smallpox epidemic arrived in Vancouver in 1892 which led to a steep drop-off in passengers. A recession in 1894, triggered by the Panic of 1893, stagnated settlement along the route, so the number of passengers the company hoped to draw ultimately did not arrive. Also in 1894, Car 15 derailed en route to Vancouver, no casualties were suffered. Major flooding of the Fraser River hit New Westminster in 1894, causing the interurban line to have its timetable changed to avoid the shorter route that was underwater in New West. Lightning also struck the power plant, damaging a dynamo. Due to bad finances, the company could not afford to repair it, nor could they afford to pay interest on company bonds. The Bank of British Columbia refused to cover their payments, forcing them into receivership on August 10, 1894. In 1895, Frank S. Barnard bought the company's assets on behalf of Consolidated Railway and Light Company for $280,000.

=== Consolidated Railway and Light Company (1895 - 1897) ===
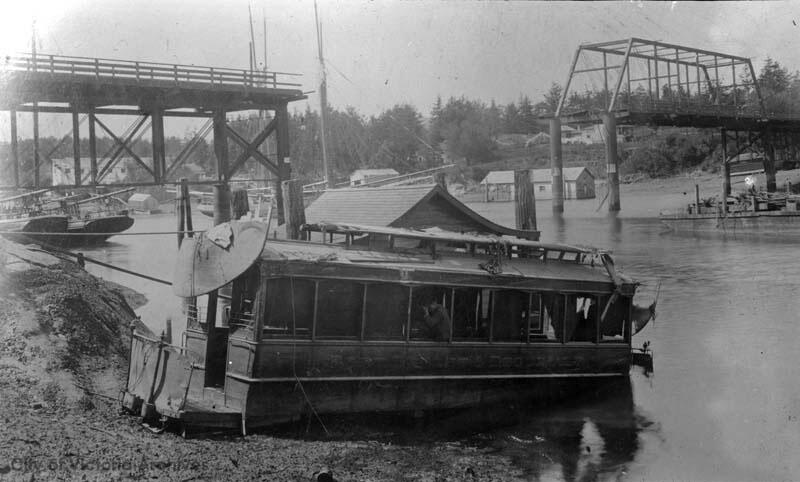
Consolidated Railway and Lighting Company car no. 16 in the water following the Point Ellice Bridge disaster on May 26, 1896.

With the global depression in the 1890s, all three existing transit companies went into receivership, and were amalgamated in 1895 into the Consolidated Railway and Light Company. Consolidated Rail was financed largely by local and English financiers, at a capitalization of one million dollars. Consolidated Rail offered reduced fares for settlers along train routes in an effort to increase ridership. The company also lobbied the provincial government to offer better terms to settlers buying crown land along the route. By 1896, streetcars in Vancouver could travel at speeds up to 8 mph on business streets and 10 mph in residential areas.

On November 22, 1895, Consolidated Rail was purchased by British financier Robert Montgomery Horne-Payne, acting on behalf of The Railway Amalgamation Syndicate. On January 8, 1896, Victoria Electric Railway and Lighting Company was possessed by Sperling and Company, who subsequently became part of Consolidated Rail on April 11. On April 17, Consolidated Rail invested $1,500,000 into the company, and changed its name officially to the Consolidated Railway Company.

While Horne-Payne was visiting BC from London to examine the state of the company in May 1896, the Point Ellice Bridge Disaster occurred. On May 26, the third day of celebrations for Queen Victoria's birthday, over 140 passengers crowded onto streetcar number 16 on way to Esquimalt. While the car crossed the poorly maintained Point Ellice Bridge, the bridge collapsed, leading to the deaths of 55 passengers. It remains the worst electric railway disaster in Canada or the United States. After the disaster, The Railway Amalgamation Syndicate stopped funding Consolidated Rail. This disaster forced Consolidated Rail into receivership again on October 13, 1896. The Canadian company, Colonial Railway and Investment Company, purchased Consolidated Rail and sold it on April 3, 1897, to the London-based British Columbia Electric Railway Company Limited.

== BC Electric Railway ==
=== Formation and early development (1897 – 1900) ===
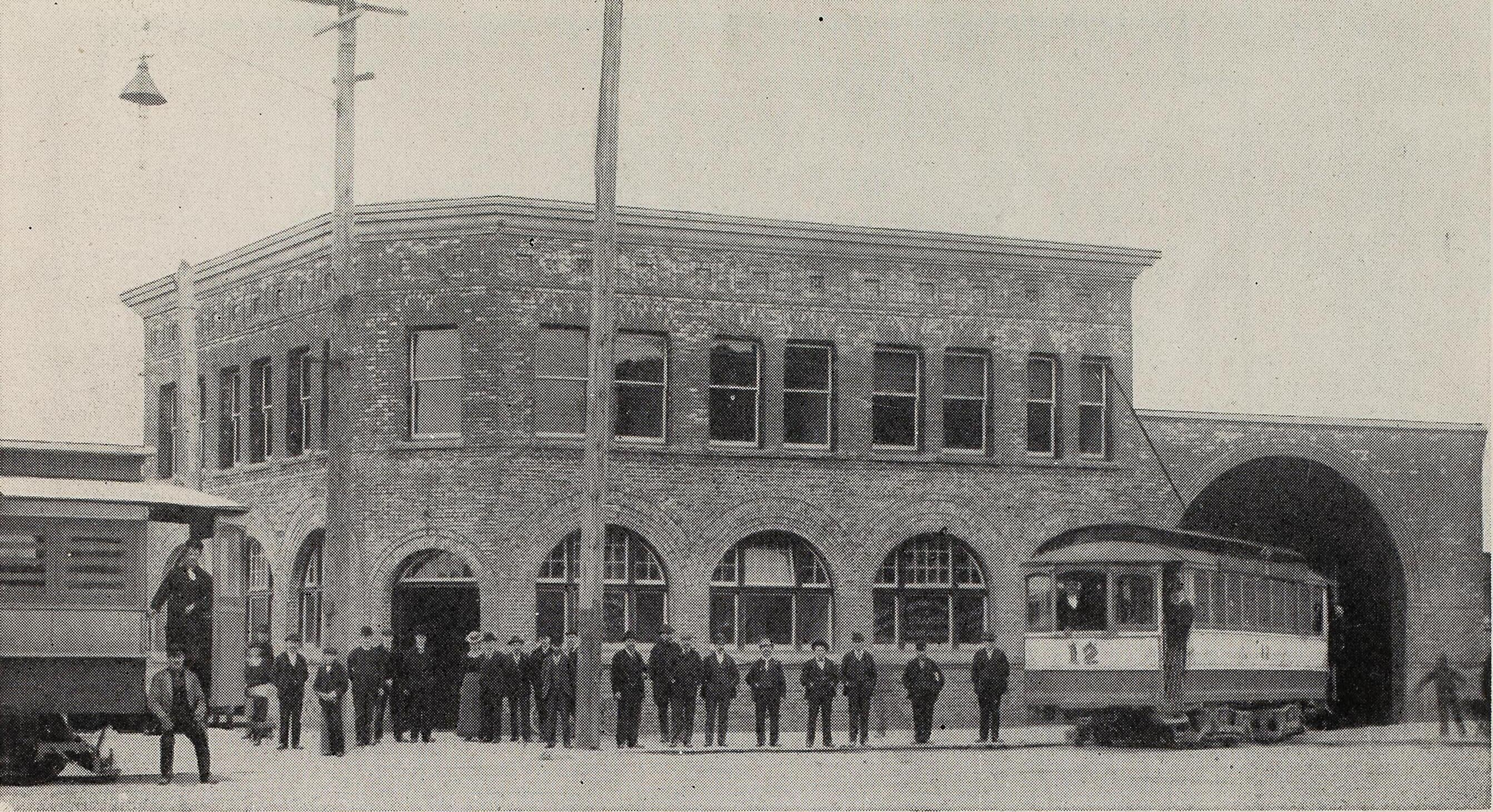
BCER head office in Vancouver, 1897.

Following the disaster in Victoria, Horne-Payne formed the British Columbia Electric Railway company on April 3, 1897. On April 15, the London-based organization purchased the entirety of Consolidated Rail's systems for $2.25 million. The BCER paid architect Francis Rattenbury $24,000 to create a new head office and depot in downtown Vancouver at the corner of Carrall and Hastings streets. Horne-Payne became the first chairman of the BCER, a position he held until 1928. R. Henry Sperling became the first General Superintendent. Horne-Payne controlled the company from London, while the company's managing director, Frank S. Barnard, worked out of Victoria. Due to the financial struggles of the organization's predecessors, the BCER's directors expanded lines cautiously in the early years, prioritizing lines that would be profitable. From 1897 to 1913, over one million pounds sterling was invested into the BCER, the majority coming from British citizens.

In the early years of the transit in greater Vancouver, new lines were formed quickly due to heavy demand. From the 1890s to the early 1900s, additional lines were built by the BCER and its predecessors. In 1895, the Robson Street streetcar line was built, and a line down Pender street to Stanley Park was constructed in 1897. By 1897, 13 double-ended streetcars were operating in Vancouver. In 1900, the BCER completed various track improvement work, including improving the Powell St line, double-tracked and extending the Main St line. A second interurban line opened in 1905 by leasing the Lulu Island line previously operated by the Canadian Pacific Railway. In 1909, a branch line was constructed on the Lulu Island line, linking Marpole to New Westminster. The first 21 miles of the Fraser Valley line began operation in 1909, reaching as far as Cloverdale. By 1910, the line had reached Chilliwack. At 102.7 kilometres (63.8 mi) in length from New Westminster to Chilliwack, the Fraser Valley line remains the longest interurban line ever constructed in Canada.

Like its predecessors, the BCER offered a variety of incentives to settlers. Starting September 1, 1897, BCER offered to ship supplies for settlers weighing under 50 lbs for free when accompanied by a rider. In 1900, BCER began to market Vancouver as a place to move to for potential settlers.

The Vancouver city council ultimately decided where the BCER could run streetcar lines, as well as the maximum speed the cars could run at. In an effort to influence their decisions, the BCER provided most city officials with free transit passes. By 1900, most BC MLAs were also receiving free passes.

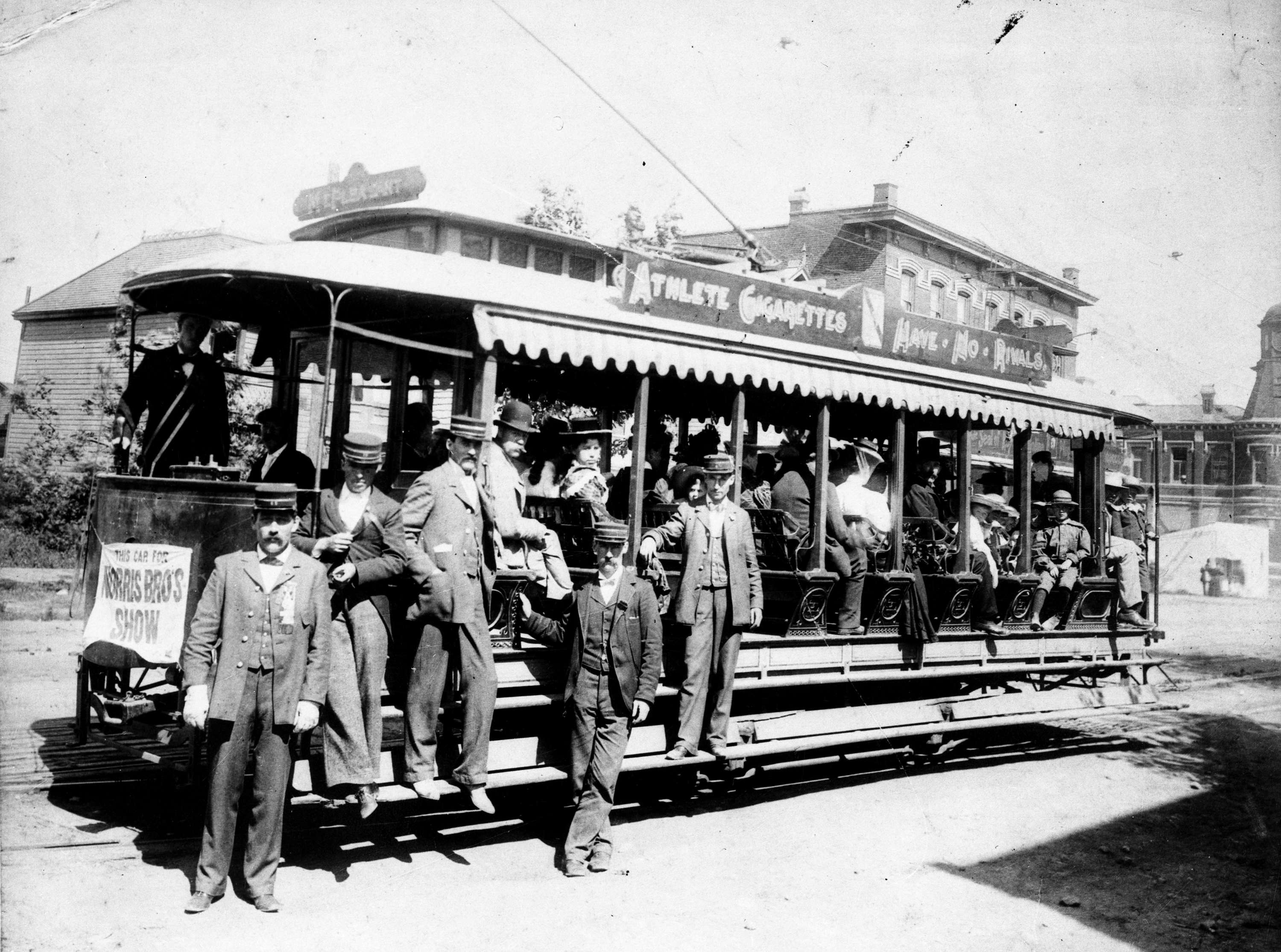
BCER conductors in front of Mount Pleasant open side streetcar, 1898.

In 1898, the BCER stopped using the Granville Bridge as it was "practically condemned", resulting in a loss of service for Fairview residents. Service for Fairview residents was not restored until a new bridge was constructed in 1909. Also in 1898, the BCER received 68 lots originally promised to Vancouver Electric Rail and Lighting by the CPR. In exchange, BCER agreed to run 20-minute service from Fairview to downtown Vancouver. Additionally, the BCER introduced coloured lights on June 8, 1898, to help make identifying streetcars easier. Pender St used green lights, Fairview used white, and "main line" cars used red lights. The system was abandoned shortly after, as riders found it confusing.

In 1900, the BCER began running streetcar service to English Bay via Davie St, which was credited with popularizing the spot. On March 26, 1900, a new depot opened in New Westminster featuring offices, a waiting room, and a covered bay for streetcars and interurbans. At this time, names began to be used instead of numbers for identifying interurban cars. BCER workers in New Westminster decided to unionize in 1900, forming local 134 of the Amalgamated Association of Street Railway Employees of America. The thirty-seven members of the local negotiated a new contract with the BCER and won a 2 cent hourly wage increase, raising their pay to 22 cents an hour. At this time, motormen and conductors worked 10.5 hour days, seven days a week.

=== Expansion (1901 - 1905) ===
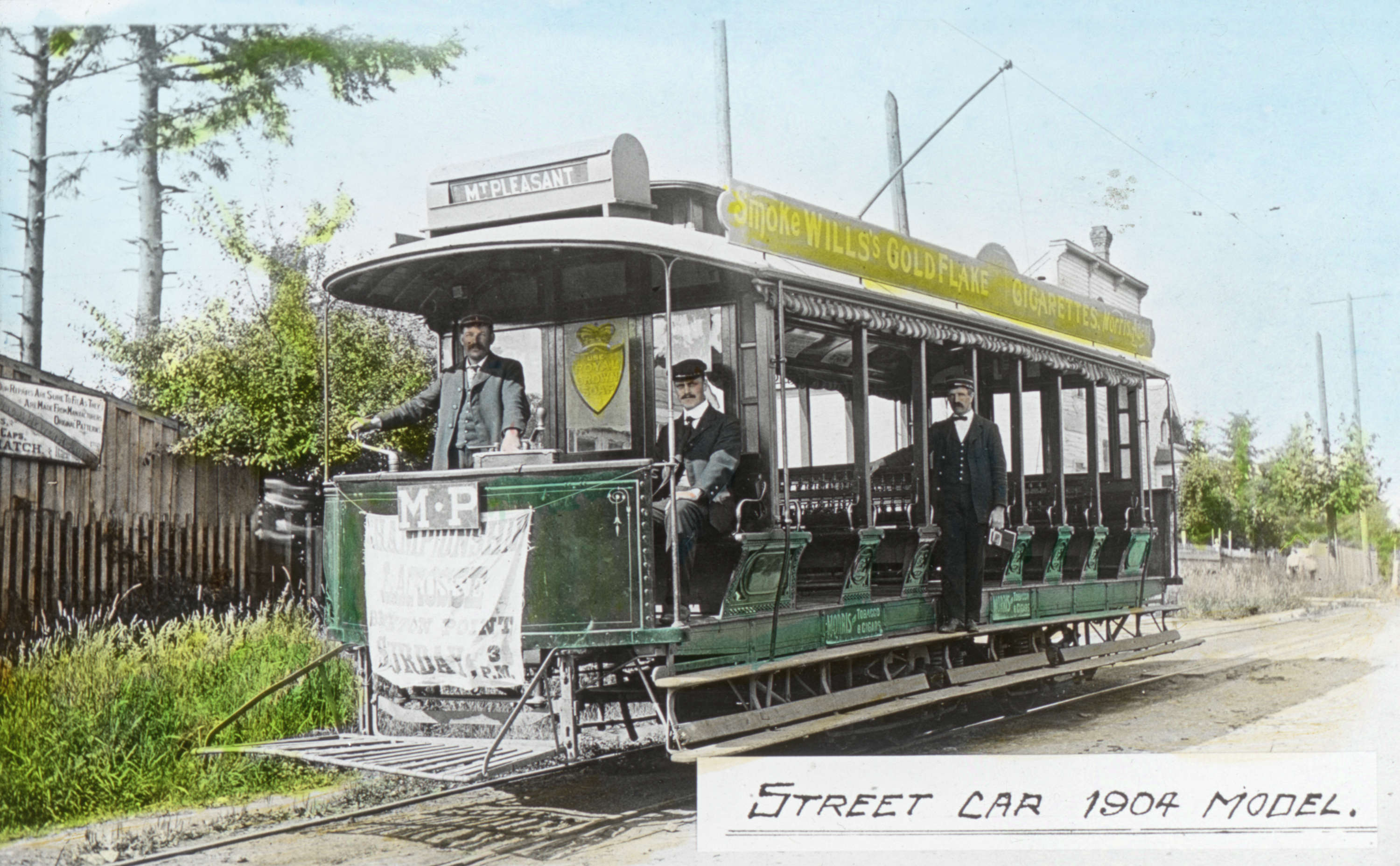
BCER Mt. Pleasant streetcar, 1904.

By 1901, the BCER had 400 regular staff throughout Vancouver, New Westminster and Victoria. The year 1901 was also the first year staff were given Sundays off. Also in 1901, a single-track streetcar line on Main St south from Ninth Ave (now called Broadway) to 16th Ave was created. At this time, BCER and the city of Vancouver reached an agreement to consolidate all streetcar lines, in order to prevent the leases of the lines from expiring at different times. This agreement also gave the city the option to purchase BCER's Vancouver operations on February 11, 1919, and every 5 years after. In return for the consolidated lines, BCER agreed to pay a higher percentage of its earnings to the city, extend the existing lines on Main and Powell streets, and follow the city's rules regarding maximum fares, minimum service, and speed limits. Finally, BCER workers formed their first local of the International Brotherhood of Electrical Workers, organizing workers who operated and maintained overhead wires and electrical rail lines.

In the early 1900s, the BCER announced that they would start manufacturing their own streetcars and interurbans at their manufacturing plant in New Westminster. Prior to this, the BCER was relying on manufacturers in the United States and eastern Canada. The first ever BC-made interurban cars were manufactured in New Westminster in 1903, where they continued manufacturing vehicles for over a decade. The first two cars were built over a period of two months, and were named "Delta" (later numbered 1203) and "Surrey" (later 1204). The finishing of the cars was built using Douglas fir and cedar wood. The first streetcars constructed here went into service on August 2.

Due to a snow storm in the winter of 1902, no streetcars operated for six weeks. In 1903, Vancouver residents pressured city council to extend the existing streetcar service that ran to the entrance of Stanley Park, through the park itself. Streetcar service began to the park's entrance in 1895. A plan was created to extend the line by 1.2 km, which would necessitate a 244-meter bridge be created. The BCER further made a rough survey for the route, but it was ultimately cancelled in October 1903 due to the personal opposition of BCER general manager, Johannes Buntzen. In 1903 and 1904, Vancouver's first sightseeing streetcar operated in the city, traveling from Gastown to Stanley Park for 25 cents per ride using an ordinary streetcar.

Streetcars running in Vancouver began operating on hydro-electric power on June 4, 1904. Power was generated at Buntzen Lake, with the generator run by the BCER subsidiary, Vancouver Power Company. On August 20, 1904, Vancouver's cemetery streetcar line ran for the first time, so members of the Street Railwaymen's Union could attend a funeral at Mountain View Cemetery. The line began regular service on September 16, running with 20-minute regular service at a length of 2.6 km. Some residents objected the designation sign on the trams reading "cemetery" and petitioned it to be changed, eventually being changed to Mountain View after the cemetery. Mountain View was South Vancouver's (at the time its own city) first streetcar line. The line ran from Main and 16th, south to 33rd Avenue, and then east to Fraser.

=== Specials and sightseeing (1906 - 1910) ===
Video of Vancouver and Victoria streets in 1907, taken from the front of BCER streetcars.

The BCER hired their first female employee in 1906, Ethel G. Golightly, who worked as a ticket and transfer clerk, earning $40 a month. The year 1906 also saw the start of streetcar service to the Grandview neighbourhood of Vancouver, running from Hastings and Main streets to First and Commercial. Around this time, the BCER began running "special" cars to take spectators to various events around the region. An example of this was the "lacrosse special" the company ran to bring people from downtown Vancouver to Queens Park in New Westminster via the Central Park interurban line for championship matches at a return fare of 50 cents. The specials originally used five or six extra regular streetcars but by 1906 Saturday games were drawing up to 10,000 people and the cars could no longer accommodate the crowds. As a solution, the company modified some open flatbed cars to feature rows of bench seats that could fit more than 100 people on a single car. The cars were coupled to an electric locomotive and outfitted with one meter high railing. Another special service brought residents to Minoru Park for horse racing via the Steveston interurban line. Service ran from Granville station directly to Minoru Park, the 32 km round trip cost $1.25 and included track entry. The horse track itself had a branch line constructed that would bring interurbans to the back of the grandstand to unload passengers and wait in the siding for fans to return at the end of the day. Freight trains were used to transport horses and hay to the track. This popular transport method was also used in 1914 when another horse track opened at Landsdowne Park. Over 50% of spectators at Minoru arrived via interurban, sparking the largest ever increase in ridership on the Steveston line. To accommodate the increase in passengers, the BCER ran nonstop race specials with extra interurbans and even used some of Vancouver's streetcars. The BCER ended up duplicating their "lacrosse trains" for horse racing spectators, modifying ten former CPR flatbed cars.

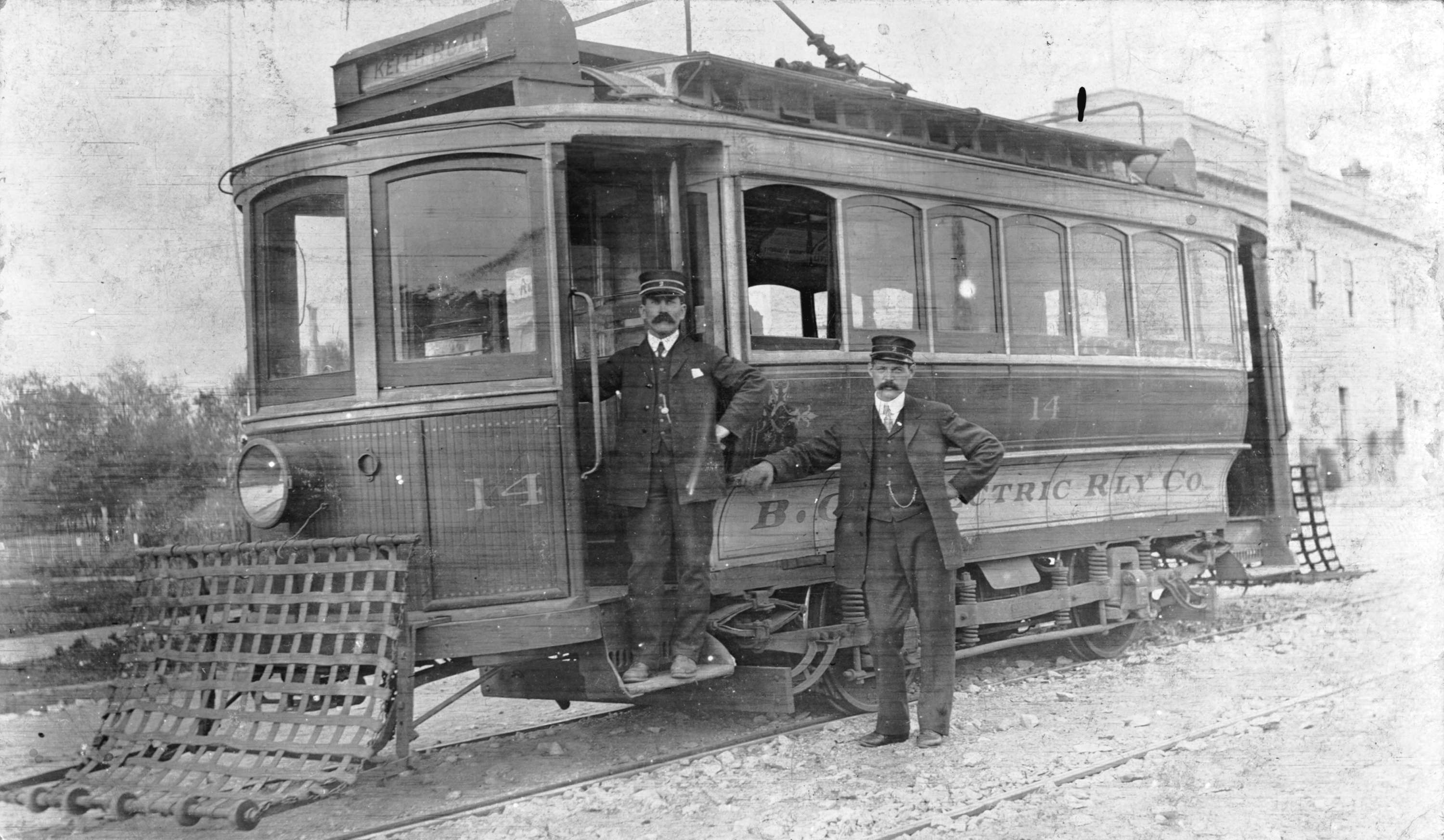
North Vancouver's first streetcar, 1907.

Following the installation of electrical poles across the Second Narrows strait of the Burrard Inlet, electricity became more commonly available to residents of North Vancouver on August 15, 1906. Power was generated and brought to the region via Lake Buntzen. North Vancouver's first streetcar made a test run on August 29, 1906, with city councilors and the BCER superintendent aboard for the ride. Due to the steep grade of nearly 10% in some sections, the line required 800 fir poles to support the trolley wire. Service officially launched on Labour Day, September 3, that year. North Vancouver's streetcar line was the fourth in BCER's system, as well as its smallest. 2,407 passengers rode the 2.1 km track from Lonsdale to 21st street on the first trip, at the time North Vancouver only had a population of 1,000 residents. The train suffered multiple derailments and a crash on the first day of service, but passengers and crew still ended the day by singing "The End of a Perfect Day". Service on the line started at 36 trips per day, and increased to 50 trips per day excluding Sundays a few weeks later. In the following years, streetcar service in North Vancouver expanded to three separate lines, including: Capilano, Lonsdale, and Grand Boulevard (later renamed to Lynn Valley). The Capilano line was expanded on May 1, 1911, the same day a ferry-service began from Lower Lonsdale.

In 1907, the BCER stopped running streetcars in both directions from Broadway and Main, instead, implementing a belt line that allowed cars to operate continuously without switching ends. This change in technology improved service, with seven cars operating on each belt line with a headway of six minutes. During rush hour, cars would arrive every ten minutes on both the inner and outer belts. By 1908, the BCER operated 48 streetcars across 8 lines in Vancouver.

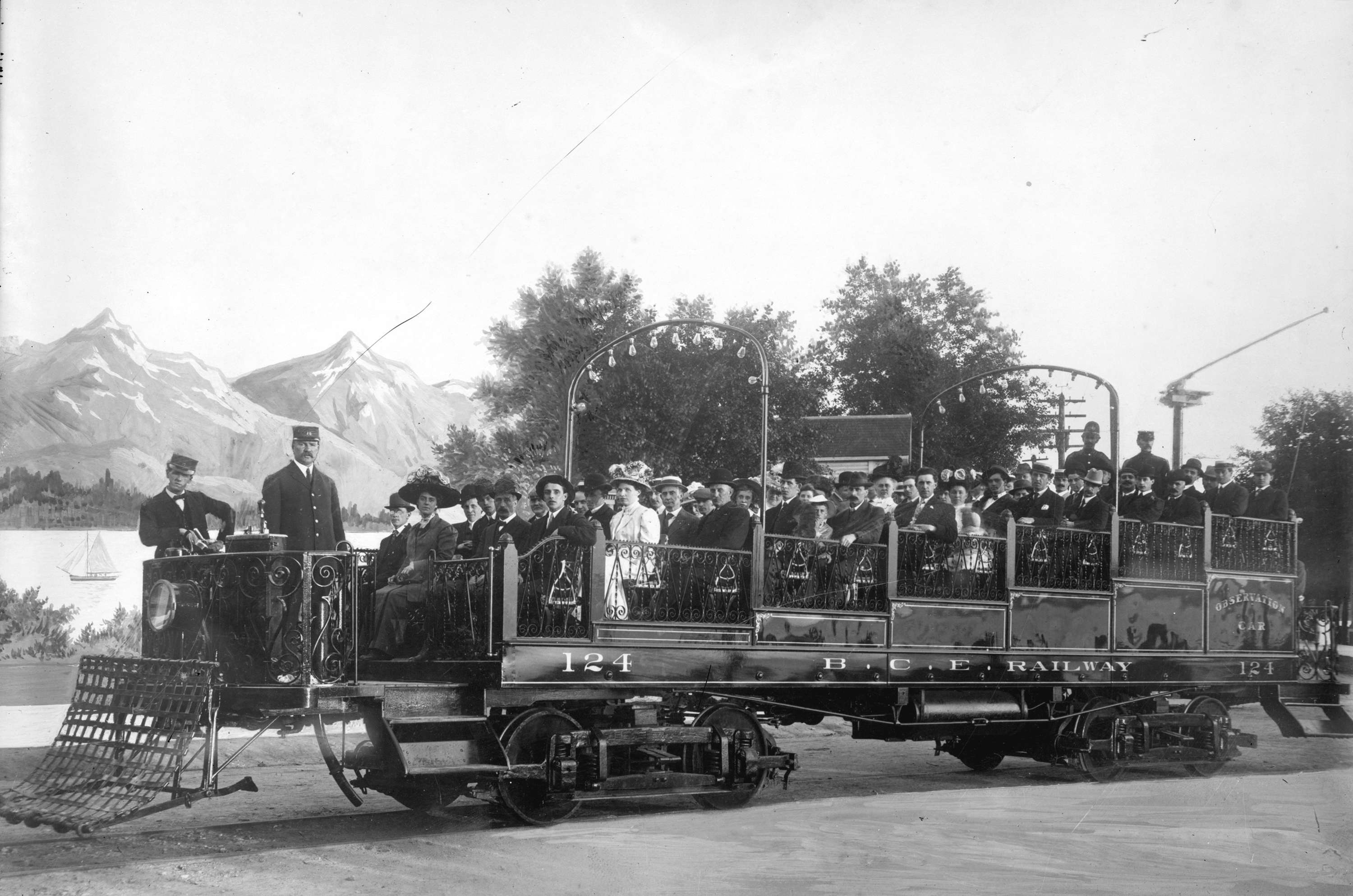
Passengers on a BCER observation car, 1912.

Around 1909, the BCER purchased designs for open-air observation streetcars from the Montreal Tramways Company. Two cars were then constructed in New Westminster, with car number 123 for use in Victoria, and car 124 for Vancouver. In 1909, the BCER debuted its first roofless observation streetcar. These cars were used for entertainment and sightseeing for tourists and locals. The cars ran every summer starting on May 24 and running until Labour Day. The car had 2 arches of lights over tiered seats, and the car's whistle tooted at every block. Tours included dog tricks, vaudeville acts, and an optional souvenir photo. Tours were two hours in length and made various stops in Vancouver, Point Grey, and South Vancouver (the latter two were not integrated into Vancouver until 1929). The optional photo available for purchase was a surprise to riders. The sightseeing car would stop a block from the Carroll St station, under the auspices of letting passengers admire the architecture of the New Dodson Hotel. Meanwhile, Harry Bullen, a photographer hired by the BCER who would book a second floor room at the hotel for the season, would take a photo of the car and its passengers. Bullen would count the number of families in the car and estimate how many photos he may sell. While the car continued its tour, Bullen would develop and print the pictures before riding his bicycle to Granville and Robson. There, he would deposit the pictures into a box at the back of the streetcar as it finished its trip. The conductor would take the photos out of the box to sell, and Bullen would bike back to the hotel to prepare for the next tour group. Over the decades two observation cars ran in the city, departing from Robson and Richards streets. The two cars were in service for 41 years, and are estimated to have transported over 1.5 million passengers over 927,000 km.

Vancouver's first pay-as-you-enter streetcar entered service on August 29, 1909. In October, a new double-tracked streetcar line on Fourth Avenue between Granville and Alma streets opened. On November 6, 1909, the Hastings Street streetcar line was extended to Boundary Road. When the new Granville Bridge opened on September 6, 1909, several dignitaries rode BCER observation car 124 over the bridge on a return trip to the Hotel Vancouver, among them being Albert Grey, 4th Earl Grey (Canada's then governor-general) and mayor Charles Douglas. The new bridge saw a restoration of streetcar service for Fairview residents, who had lost service in 1898 due to the poor state of the previous bridge. In November, interurban service between Marpole and New Westminster launched. From October to December 1909, new streetcar lines were launched in largely uninhabited areas of Vancouver with the goal of attracting settlers to the region.

In October 1909, streetcar service expanded through Fourth Avenue, in what is now Kitsilano. At the time, the area was undeveloped forest.

=== Boom years (1910 – 1912) ===
The year 1910 saw huge demands on BCER's transit system. The company could not keep up with demand, and committed to acquiring 122 cars in the next year, 50 of which would be slated for Vancouver alone. Due to the sheer volume of cars needed, they were not all able to be constructed in BCER's New Westminster depot, and cars had to be ordered from other manufacturers. On August 22, 1910, Vancouver's single-day ridership record was broken when 122,455 passengers rode across the city's transit system. Transit ridership also spiked in Victoria in 1910, where the 200 streetcars and interurbans carried nearly 40 million riders in 1910 (up by 10 million over 1909) and hauled 41,142 tons of freight.

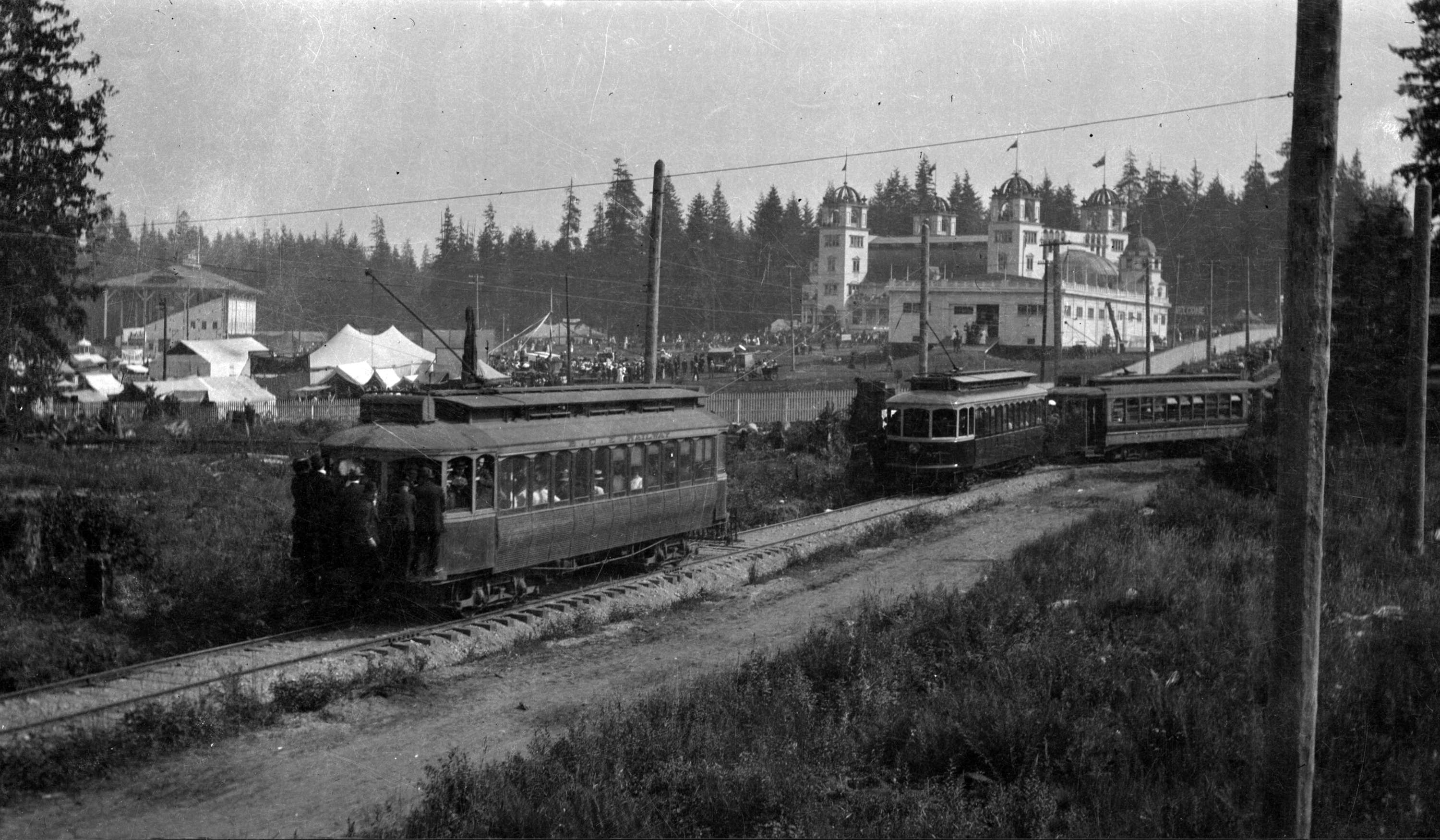
First Vancouver Exhibition opening at Hastings Park with Powell Street streetcars arriving, 1910. Note the passengers holding onto the rear of the tram.

On July 1, 1910, the BCER started freight service from New Westminster to Cloverdale and Jardine. On January 11, 1911, four interurban cars were trapped in the snow on the Central Park interurban line and had to be abandoned. From August 16 to 21, 1910, thousands of people crowded streetcars to see prime minister Wilfrid Laurier open Vancouver's first exhibition at Hastings Park. Similar ridership demands were seen on May 24, 1911, when the BCER moved 12,000 people to Queens Park in New Westminster to attend Empire Day celebrations.

Tracks were installed near the University Endowment Lands in 1910, with service beginning on the new line on February 25, 1911. The line was closed in 1912 due to a franchise disagreement between BCER and the municipality of Point Grey. The line re-opened in September 1912 after the dispute was resolved. Around this time, Point Grey gained new transit extensions, including the extension of the Shaughnessy Heights line in October 1911, the Oak St line in September 1913, and the Sasamat line in November 1913. These streetcar lines in and around Point Grey helped bring settlers to the area. On September 17, 1912, the BCER introduced a five-cent rate for settlers on the Point Grey streetcar line.

In 1910, the debate over access to Stanley Park was reignited as more Vancouverites wanted access to the park, to the dismay of tourists and West End upper class residents. Working class residents argued that Vancouver's park board discriminated against transit modes, as they allowed wealthy residents to enter the park on horse-drawn carriages and cars, but denied the wider public access via public transit. The City Beautiful movement brought further attention to the debate, as they prioritized un-trammelled and natural park access. In August 1910, a private operator submitted a proposal to run streetcars around the circumference of the park. In January 1912, a plebiscite marginally approved a 1910 proposal for a city-owned streetcar service to operate in Stanley Park, but it was ultimately defeated due to the opposition of wealthy West End residents.

In 1911, the BCER constructed a new head office in downtown Vancouver. At this time, they also launched a night service. Nicknamed the "owl", cars ran from midnight to 3:20am at a cost of double the regular rates. May 1911 saw the BCER's highest ever ridership numbers in Vancouver at nearly 3.5 million riders. The year 1911 also saw the launch of the BCER's new interurban line, the Burnaby Lake line on June 12.

In 1912, Canada's governor-general, the Duke of Connaught visited Vancouver alongside his wife, the Duchess of Connaught and their daughter, Princess Patricia. This marked the couple's second visit to the city, with their first being in 1890. The BCER decorated its head office with strings of lights for the occasion, and transformed interurban car 1304 for the royal guests. The car had its seats and partitions removed and replaced with plush lounge chairs and sofas in cream and green, with white curtains and carpeting, transforming the car into a sitting room. The exterior of the car was freshly painted with two royal coat of arms on either side, and the name Connaught emblazoned alongside the BCER name in golden letters. During their visit, the Duke and Dutchess officially opened the Cambie Bridge, replacing the previous bridge constructed in 1894. Car 1304 returned to regular service after the royal visit, with the seats and partitions being put back.

By 1912, the majority of British Columbia's residents lived within one of the BCER's service areas. During rush hour, 140 streetcars operated in Vancouver. At this time, the BC Minister of Railways released a regulation prohibiting streetcars from exceeding 12 mph on city business streets, and 18 mph on other streets. Various orders of new cars were made by the BCER this year to keep up with demand, including an order for 28 passenger interurbans and 2 express baggage cars from the St. Louis Car Company, and an order of 40 streetcars from Preston Car Company. Other changes introduced in 1912 include more distinct destination signs on Vancouver's streetcars, including symbols and colours, and on-board signal buzzers for passenger use.

=== Decline and competition (1913 - 1918) ===
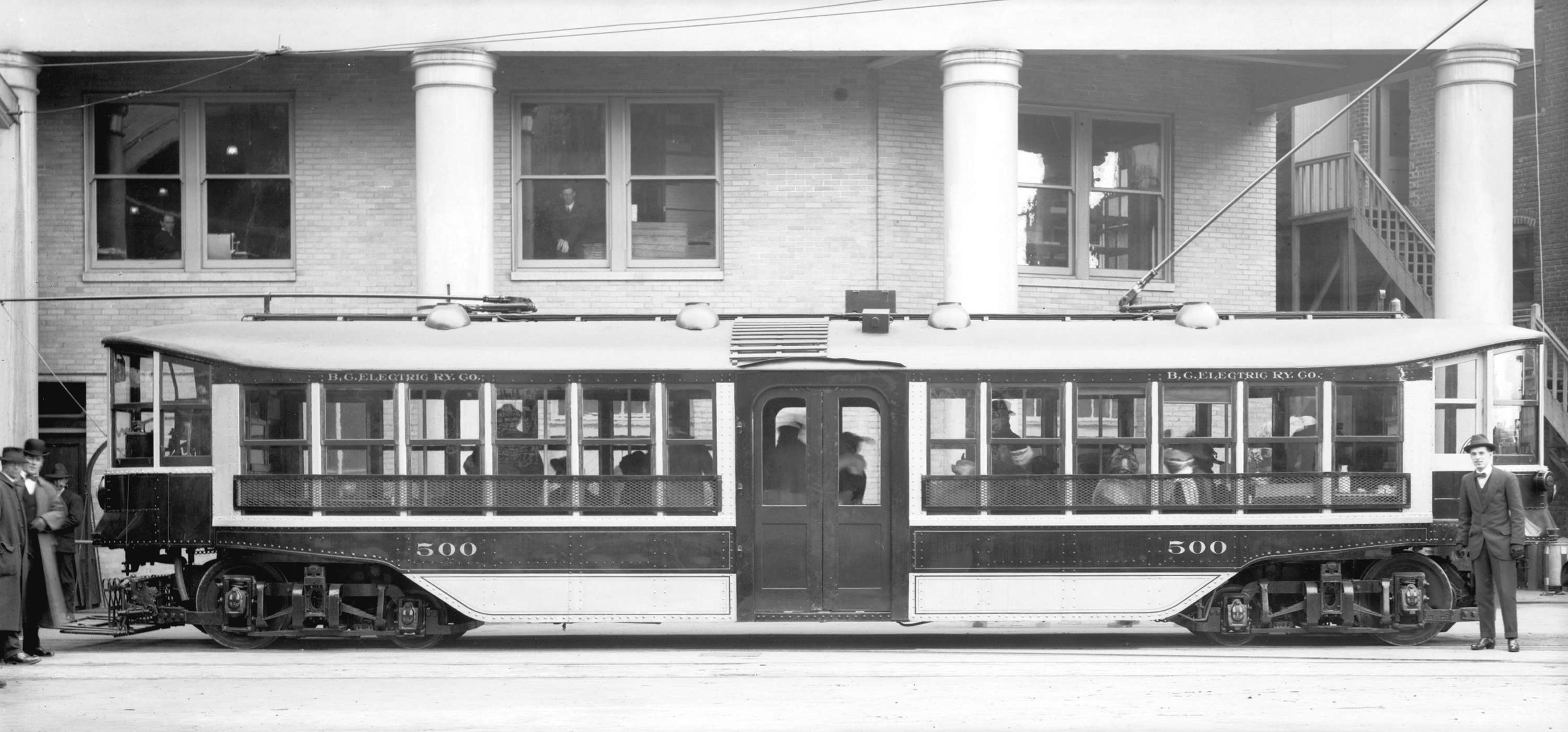
B.C. Electric Railway Company stepless streetcar, 1913. Designed for women wearing hobble skirts, the train was met with enthusiasm at first followed by apathy.

1913 saw the end of the BCER's early boom period. As ridership fell over the previous year, fares were increased and streetcar service frequency was reduced. This year saw some bad investments by the BCER. First, a new streetcar line opened in South Vancouver along 41st Avenue between Main and Granville streets, but no cars ever ran on the route. Then, the company imported a luxury stepless streetcar from New York City, which was met with initial fanfare followed by apathy. The car was designed with lower platforms so women wearing the then-fashionable hobble skirt, which limited their stride to 30 cm, could board easily. The car cleared the rails just by 18 cm and had just one door located in the center of the vehicle, opposed to the front entrance and rear exit of the regular streetcars. The car officially began service on March 18, 1913, but operated only for a few months due to a lack of ridership as passengers disliked the single middle door. The hobble car would also careen off the tracks due to its low-centre construction. The stepless car was also less powerful compared to the other cars, was more expensive to purchase, and its parts were not compatible with BCER's other trams.

As costs and capital investments soared,the BCER's profits at the end of June 1913 were only up by $3,000 over five years earlier. Capital investments totaled $43 million in 1913, compared to $12 million in 1908. The BCER announced in the fall that they were considering selling the company's Vancouver streetcar system to the city, which ultimately did not occur. The year 1914 saw the number of passengers on Vancouver's streetcars continue to fall, and in November jitneys began to appear in Vancouver. These private automobiles would cruise streetcar lines and pick up waiting passengers, speeding them to their destinations faster than the streetcars could travel. Jitneys would charge just 5 cents per ride, and half a dozen or more people were often crammed into a single auto, with passengers often holding onto aftermarket handlebars and standing on the auto's mud guards. Jitneys would often run just a few minutes ahead of the streetcars schedule and even display the same destination signage as the cars. By mid-January 1915, more than 100 jitneys ran in Vancouver, exploding to over 250 by just the end of the same month. The BCER was losing an average of $2,000 a month due to the marked drop in ridership from jitneys. From 1914 to 1915, ridership dropped by over 17 million passengers and the company's revenue fell by $1.3 million.

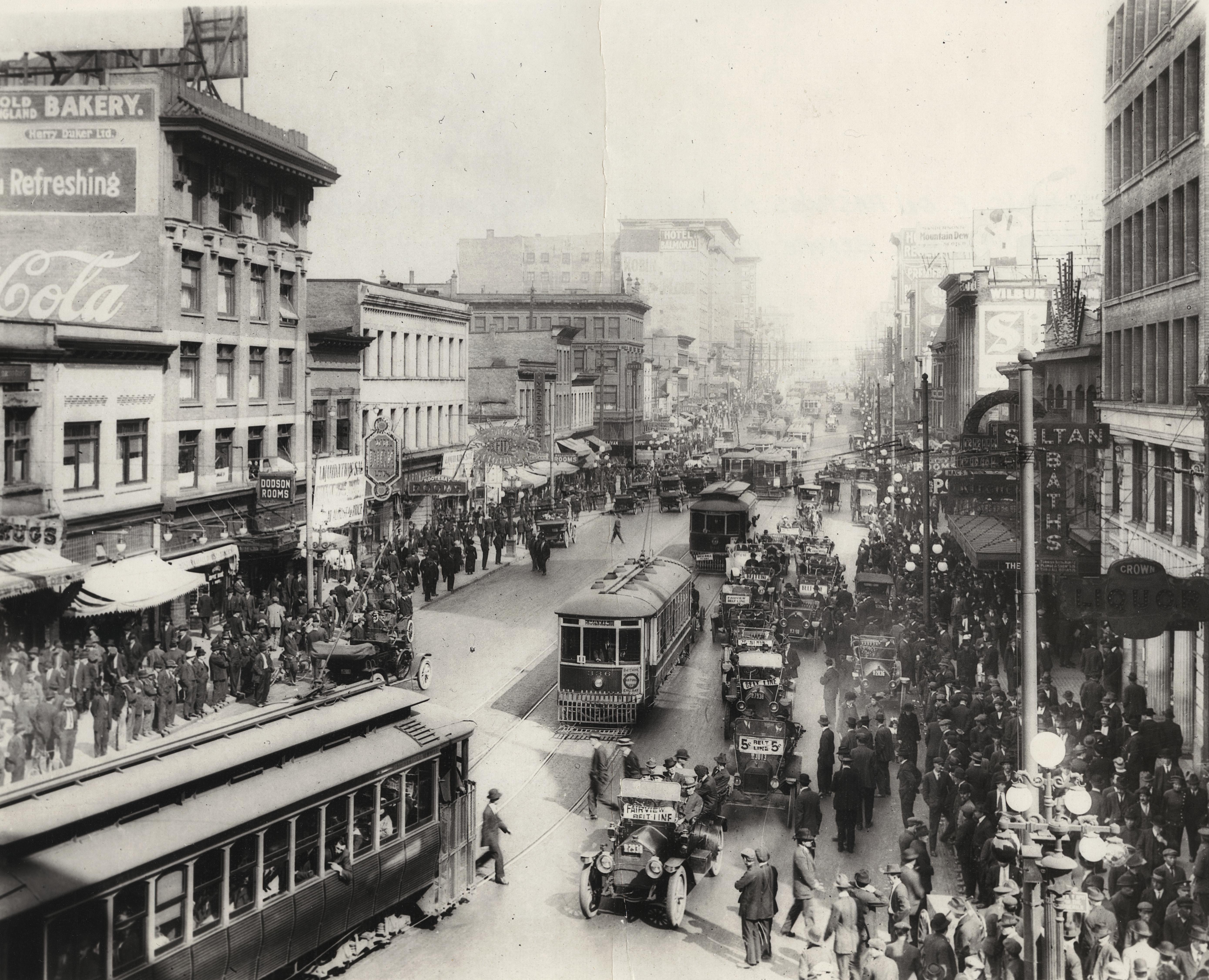
Looking E. on Hastings at Carral St from the BCER Building, prior to 1919. Note the large amount of jitneys on the right, displaying signs for the Fairview Belt line streetcar route.

In an effort to tempt riders, the BCER offered reduced fares on streetcars, and on interurbans running from Vancouver to New Westminster. Other changes made in response to jitneys included increasing the running times of streetcars, creating public timetables for the first time, establishing new shuttle lines to downtown Vancouver, and adding additional streetcars during rush hour. The BC Electric Railway also introduced The Buzzer on June 2, 1916, a free pamphlet available on streetcars and interurbans, which TransLink continues to distribute today. The leaflet initially went unnamed before being named by the winners of a contest. Released ostensibly as a means of maintaining good public relations, the flyers also argued against jitneys and tried to make the public aware of the long-term issues the share taxis may cause. The BCER also extended the Hastings Street line again, this time reaching Burnaby, from Boundary Road to Ellesmere Avenue.

The company also attempted to lobby the provincial and municipal governments to regulate jitneys, to which Vancouver mayor LD Taylor said "present management of the BCER have only themselves to blame for their present plight". The stiff competition from jitneys and loss in funds went on to cause a large transit worker strike in June 1917. The eight day job action involved nearly all of the company's conductors, motormen, and car barn staff. Staff struck again in 1918 for nine days in an attempt for wage increasing. The city of Vancouver ended up banning jitneys after years of BCER lobbying efforts, in 1918.

In November, 1915, the BCER shutdown its first line across the system, closing the one car "shuttle" line on Commercial Drive due to a lack of customers. Only 152 streetcars were running during rush hour in Vancouver in 1915, a large decrease from previous years. Freight service was also down in 1915 in addition to passenger service, with the BCER hauling 100,000 tons in 1915 compared to 258,029 tons in 1914.

In 1915, the BCER ran a regular Sunday service on the Fraser Valley interurban line. The line brought baseball spectators to the Huntington station, where fans would disembark and walk across the US border to watch games in Sumas, Washington. These trips violated Canada's Lord's Day Act, which legally prevented activities from occurring on Sundays. A petition was sent to BC's attorney general William John Bowser to request the BCER stop this service, but he refused the request and instead expressed his support for an expansion of access to recreational activities on Sundays.

Following the end of World War I, the BCER began offering motor bus service.

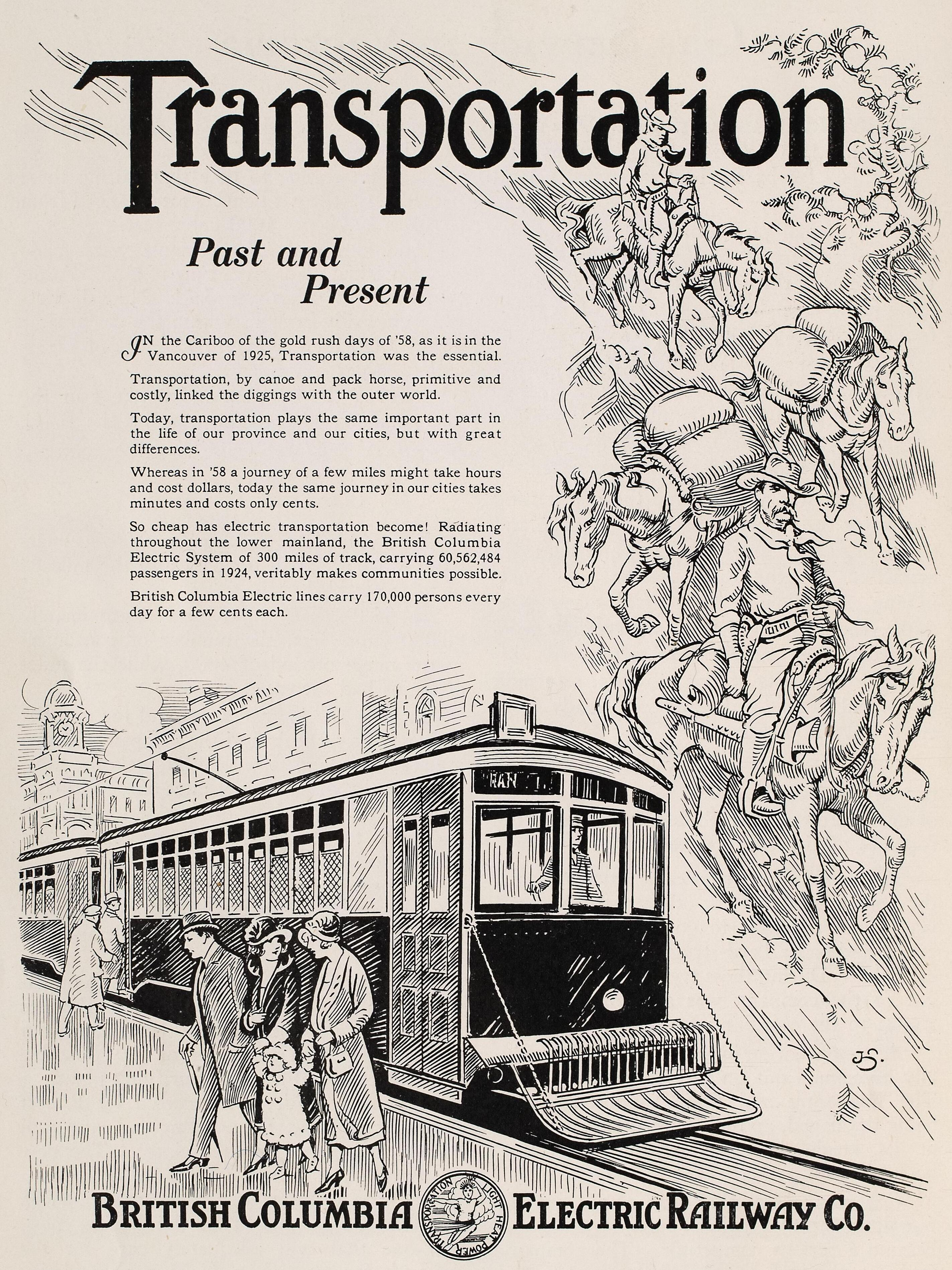
1925 BC Electric Railway advertisement.

=== 1920s ===
On January 1, 1922, traffic in coastal British Columbia (including trams and interurbans) changed from running on the left side of the road to the right side. Prior to this, BC remained as one of the last outliers in North America that drove on the left, a legacy of BC's history as a British colony. The majority of BC had switched to right-handed driving on July 1, 1920 with the notable exception of the coast (i.e. the Lower Mainland and Vancouver Island). This exception was granted to allow the BCER time to perform the technical changes necessary to allow for right-handed traffic. The province agreed to pay for half of the cost of converting BCER's equipment to allow the change, up to a maximum $350,000.

On March 19, 1923, the BCER launched its first motor bus service in Vancouver, running on Grandview Highway. In the 1920s, the BCER invested in new hydro electric projects, including the Bridge River Project. The BCER created the British Columbia Rapid Transit Company on February 12, 1924. This company had the goal of purchasing motor passenger and freight lines from companies that were competing with BCER interurban lines between Vancouver, New Westminster, and Chilliwack. On May 1, 1924, BC Rapid Transit launched its first intercity bus service, running from Vancouver to New Westminster. On October 1, 1924, the Saanich line ceased service in Victoria, with much of the rolling stock transferred to the Lower Mainland for use in the local system. In 1925, the BCER created a new subsidiary named the B.C. Motor Transportation Company, which amalgamated three previously independent companies: Yellow Cabs, Pacific Stage Lines, Triangle and Circle Sightseeing Tours. By 1926, BCER had an annual ridership of 72,000,000 passengers. On May 19, 1928, the BCER became a Canadian company, incorporating as the B.C. Power Corporation Limited and purchasing shares from BC Electric. The company retained the name BC Electric and BCER. By 1929, the BCER's rail system consisted of 418 passenger cars, and its freight service consisted of 12 electric locomotives and 456 freight, express, and service cars. The BC Rapid Transit Co. had a fleet of 23 coach busses, with route to the University of British Columbia considered the busiest in the network. For the year ending June 30, 1929, the BCER transported 78,500,381 passengers. At this time, the company was providing services to the majority of BC's residents including rail, electricity, and gas. Streetcar fares throughout the system were five-cents with the exception of Vancouver, which charged seven-cents. In addition to providing public transportation, the BCER also offered streetcars, interurbans, and busses available for chartering.

=== Later years (1930 - 1950) ===
From January 1938 to March 1943 the average daily ridership rose from 150,000 to 270,000. As men left the workforce to enlist in World War II, the BCER hired women to work on transit vehicles for the first time. Called "conductorettes", they worked on Vancouver streetcars but not interurbans. Women also worked as "electric guides", selling streetcar tickets at busy stops in Vancouver. While many women were put out of work in other industries when men returned from the war, conductorettes were able to stay in their roles thanks to their union membership. On January 27, 1939, the BCER introduced their first PCC streetcar, car number 400. The company ultimately operated thirty-six streetcars of this model within the city of Vancouver.

By 1944, the BCER's rail system was the largest of its kind in Canada, with 327.41 miles (526.92 km) of track, compared to Montreal Tramways' 279.34 miles (449.55 km) and Toronto Transportation Commission's 266.88 miles (429.50 km).

=== Freight service ===
The BCER inherited freight service from the Westminster and Vancouver Tramway Company. Freight service was very popular, especially with farmers who shipped chickens, eggs, and crops to market. In 1903, the BCER opened its first service dedicated solely to freight service. Nicknamed the Strawberry Special, the freight trains were equipped with larger cars to handle the crop which was transferred from Burnaby along the Central Park interurban line. Farmers on the Lulu Island line received reduced fare prices from the BCER. By spring 1911, the BCER was carrying over 23,000 liters of milk to Vancouver from the Fraser Valley daily, with empty cans being returned at night.

On multi-car interurbans, express packages and letters were stored in the front most car. This car would also carry belongings and parcels for settlers. Freight service was also offered to people who bought goods in Vancouver but did not want to carry them home. These customers could bring the item to a BCER office downtown and pay a small fee to have the item sent to a designated station on a night freight train. The total tonnage of freight hauled by the BCER increased from 1911 to 1913 from 78,000 tons to 256,000 tons.

== Power ==
=== Power generation ===
Power was initially generated via steam plants, before transitioning to hydroelectricity. Power was supplied by then-innovative diversion projects at Buntzen Lake and on the Stave River system farther east, all of which were built primarily to supply power for the interurbans and street railway.

In 1920, BCER purchased the Western Power Company of Canada, who owned the Stave Falls power plant. The BCER expanded the existing power plant to become the largest of its kind west of Niagara, and it provided the majority of the BC Electric power on the mainland.

=== Home electricity ===
The BCER marketed electricity to home customers, and encouraged clients to use more electricity than they needed. They marketed and sold electrical appliances, and offered repair services. The BCER offered free cooking classes to show people how to use electrical and gas ranges.

=== Gas ===
In addition to electricity, the BCER produced and sold gas power to households. Coal for gas production was mined on Vancouver Island, and gas was produced in Victoria and Vancouver. Gas was used for home heating and cooking, as well as for industrial use. The BCER also sold coal byproducts, including ammonium sulfate and briquets.

== Interurban rail lines ==
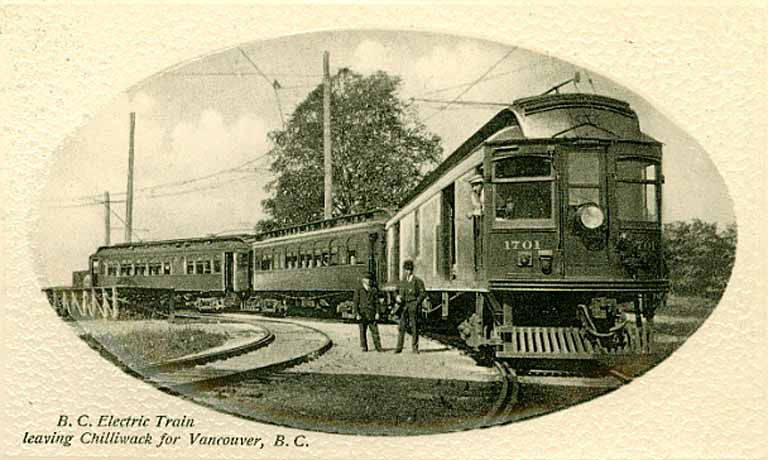
BCER interurban leaving Chilliwack for Vancouver

Interurban rail lines were operated by the BCER throughout British Columbia, with five lines operating in the Lower Mainland. Interurban cars were similar to the streetcars run by the company, but were larger and more powerful, giving them the ability to haul freight in addition to passengers. Interurbans ran throughout the region from 1891 to 1958. They allowed people to settle further out from the cities, where land was cheaper. New communities often were established near interurban stations. The public viewed interurbans as a fast and safe method of transportation. Later models of cars had the capacity to seat 64 passengers and could travel at 80 km/h.

Interurbans shaped development throughout the region. Buildings close to the line were shaped to allow for interurban traffic, and industrial buildings were constructed close to the tracks, some with their own spur lines. Interurbans also brought commercial success to areas like New Westminster and Vancouver. The Fraser Valley line brought people to public markets in New Westminster, terminating at Carrall and Hastings streets, bringing thousands of people a day to the then-bustling Downtown Eastside.

=== Main lines ===
==== Central Park Line ====
The Central Park line was the first interurban constructed, with the Westminster and Vancouver Tramway Company beginning construction on it on August 1, 1890. Service on the line began on June 3, 1891, running twice daily from New Westminster to eastern Vancouver. The Central Park line was the first interurban line to launch in Canada. The route itself follows a trail used by various Salish peoples for centuries.

On December 2, 1912, the Central Park's gradient into New Westminster becomes less significant after the 3.6-mile Highland Park cutoff comes into service.

Service along the Central Park line ended in 1953 as part of the rails-to-rubber transition. Following the cessation of interurban services, the right-of-way remained under the control of BC Hydro. By 1975, the Greater Vancouver Regional District proposed incorporating the right-of-way into a light rail line linking Vancouver and New Westminster, thereby reinstating passenger rail service on the corridor. The provincial government eventually took over the project, which evolved into the Vancouver SkyTrain's Expo Line, which largely follows the same right of way as the BCER's Central Park line from New Westminster to Vancouver. BC Hydro inherited ownership of the land the line runs on from the BCER, and TransLink is a licence holder to the land. The cycle and walking trail, BC Parkway, also runs alongside the SkyTrain's tracks.

==== Vancouver–Marpole ====
BCER began the Vancouver-Steveston interurban and freight service in 1905 after leasing the line from Canadian Pacific Railway (CPR) and electrifying it. The Vancouver-Marpole line's right-of-way (whose northern section runs beside Arbutus Street) remained under the ownership of the CPR, which continued running freight trains on the corridor until June 2001. With the end of freight operations on the line in sight, Vancouver City Council adopted the Arbutus Corridor Official Development Plan in 2000, designating the corridor as a transportation/greenway public thoroughfare to prevent other types of development from taking place along the right-of-way.

==== Marpole–Steveston (Lulu Island Branch) ====
On January 20, 1905, the BCER announced their plan to lease the Vancouver and Lulu Island Railway from Canadian Pacific Rail, and start interurban service from Vancouver to Steveston. This required electrification of the line and installation of trolley wires, which necessitated a new substation be constructed at Eburne. The BCER formed their second interurban line between Marpole and Steveston through leasing the existing line from the CPR, who had previously operated twice-daily service from 1902 to 1905. The BCER electrified the existing line, and at the same time brought electricity to the residents of Steveston. Nicknamed the Sockeye Limited or Sockeye Special, due to Steveston's canning industry. Regular service began on July 4, 1905, and ran hourly between Vancouver-Marpole-Steveston.

The Steveston line's alignment on Lulu Island can be traced by Railway Avenue, Granville Avenue, Garden City Road, and Great Canadian Way. After the end of passenger service in 1958 the Granville and Garden City section of the line was relocated largely parallel to River Road north of Westminster Highway. The interurban cars reflected the Edwardian style of the time. Each car had etched windows, decorated luggage racks, brass fixtures, and smoking compartments.

Residents of Steveston and other suburbs often took interurbans to travel to popular attractions in Vancouver proper, such as theatres. Likewise, Vancouverites occasionally rode the line to watch performances at Steveston's opera house.

Service ended on February 28, 1958, marking the complete end of rail passenger service for the BC Electric. Interurban car 1225 made the final standard trip, with cars 1231/1222 and 1208/1207 running a final ceremonial run later that day. Car 1231 was the last rail passenger car to operate for the BC Electric Railway.

In 2016, the city of Vancouver acquired the Arbutus corridor from Canadian Pacific Railway and turned the previous section of the interurban line into a rails-to-trail path.

==== Marpole–New Westminster ====
Interurban service between Marpole and New Westminster along the North Arm of the Fraser River was started on November 15, 1909. Interurbans on this line and the Central Park line would meet at 12th Street Junction. Still in operation today, as part of the Southern Railway of British Columbia.

==== New Westminster–Chilliwack (Fraser Valley Branch) ====
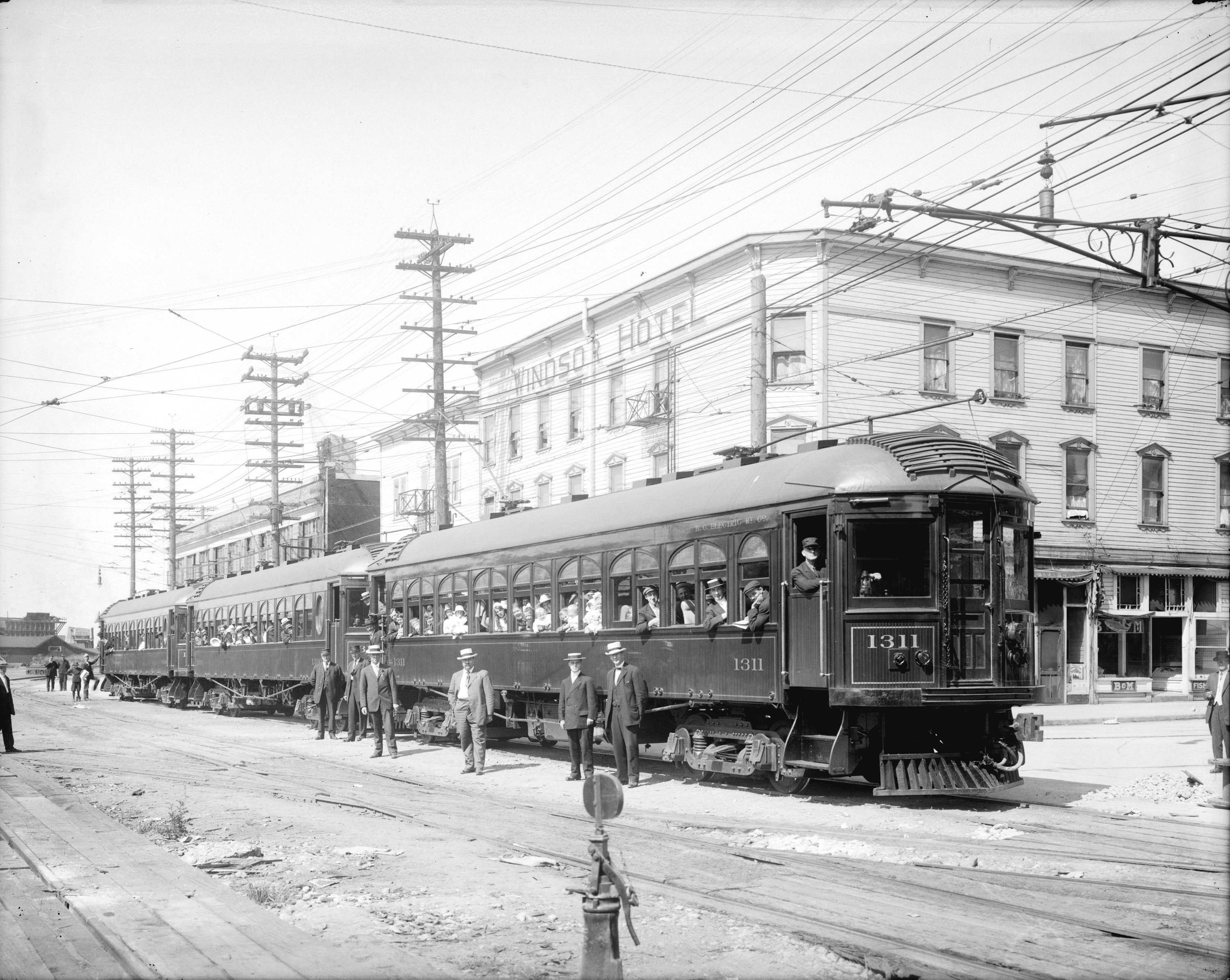
Fraser Valley line interurbans in New Westminster, 1910.

The creation of the Chilliwack interurban line was announced by BCER general manager R. H. Sperling on September 24, 1906. BC premier Richard McBride drove the last spike into the BCER's Fraser Valley line on October 3, 1910. At 102.7 km in length, the line remains the longest interurban line ever constructed in Canada. Officially opened October 4, 1910, and still in operation today, as part of the Southern Railway of British Columbia. The launch of this interuban line brought an end to steamship service for Chilliwack, and resulted in the formation of the city of Langley. This line made use of the New Westminster Bridge, which opened in 1904. In larger centers on the Fraser Valley line, there were proper stations complete with baggage rooms, waiting rooms, and an office where BCER agents would sell tickets, market home electricity, collect bills from electricity customers, and arrange for freight shipments. These more complete stations included Cloverdale, Milner, Jardine, Mt. Lehman, Clayburn, Abbotsford, Huntingdon, Sardis, and Chilliwack. Other stations along the route were essentially sheds used to protect passengers from the elements. The journey from Chilliwack to Vancouver took 3.25 hours, and trains were equipped with toilets and a water-cooler.

The line itself was used by both passengers and as a freight line. Temporary service exclusively for use by dairy farmers to transport milk to the city started on May 4, 1910, and continued throughout the operation of the line. On November 1, 1910, the BCER introduced the "Market Special" service which brought farmers from the valley to the New Westminster farmer's market. The service was deadheaded at Abbotsford and would pickup farmers, chickens, eggs, milk, and produce en route to New Westminster.

By early 1911, the line averaged 900 passengers a week. Service ran twice daily, with a third train service added on April 1, 1911. To prepare for the royal visit of the Duke and Duchess of Connaught and their daughter, Princess Patricia, car number 1304 was lavishly outfitted for a royal train ride. The exterior was repainted and the royal coat of arms was affixed to it, and the Connaught name was printed on the sides of the car. Seats and partitions were removed to instead house a living room with carpets, curtains, and chairs. After the royal visit, the car was reverted to its original state for normal operations.

In 1930, due to the Great Depression, several larger stations along the Fraser Valley line were closed and its agents were transferred to other stations. The closed stations became flag stops. By March 27, 1931, passenger counts had dropped from a peak of 1,200 per week to less than 400 a week. Due to the drop in ridership, the midday train service was cut and service reverted to two trains daily. The midday train later resumed service on February 18, 1939, but milk trains number 500 and 501 were discontinued. During World War II, worker shortages and the loss of milk trains caused more stations to close and become flag stops. Station attendants only worked in the Cloverdale, Langley, Abbotsford, and Chilliwack stations.

The final day of service for the Fraser Valley line was September 30, 1950. Trains were decorated and adorned with electricity mascot Reddy Kilowatt, and the last train to Chilliwack departed with dignitaries, the BCER president, and old conductors on board.

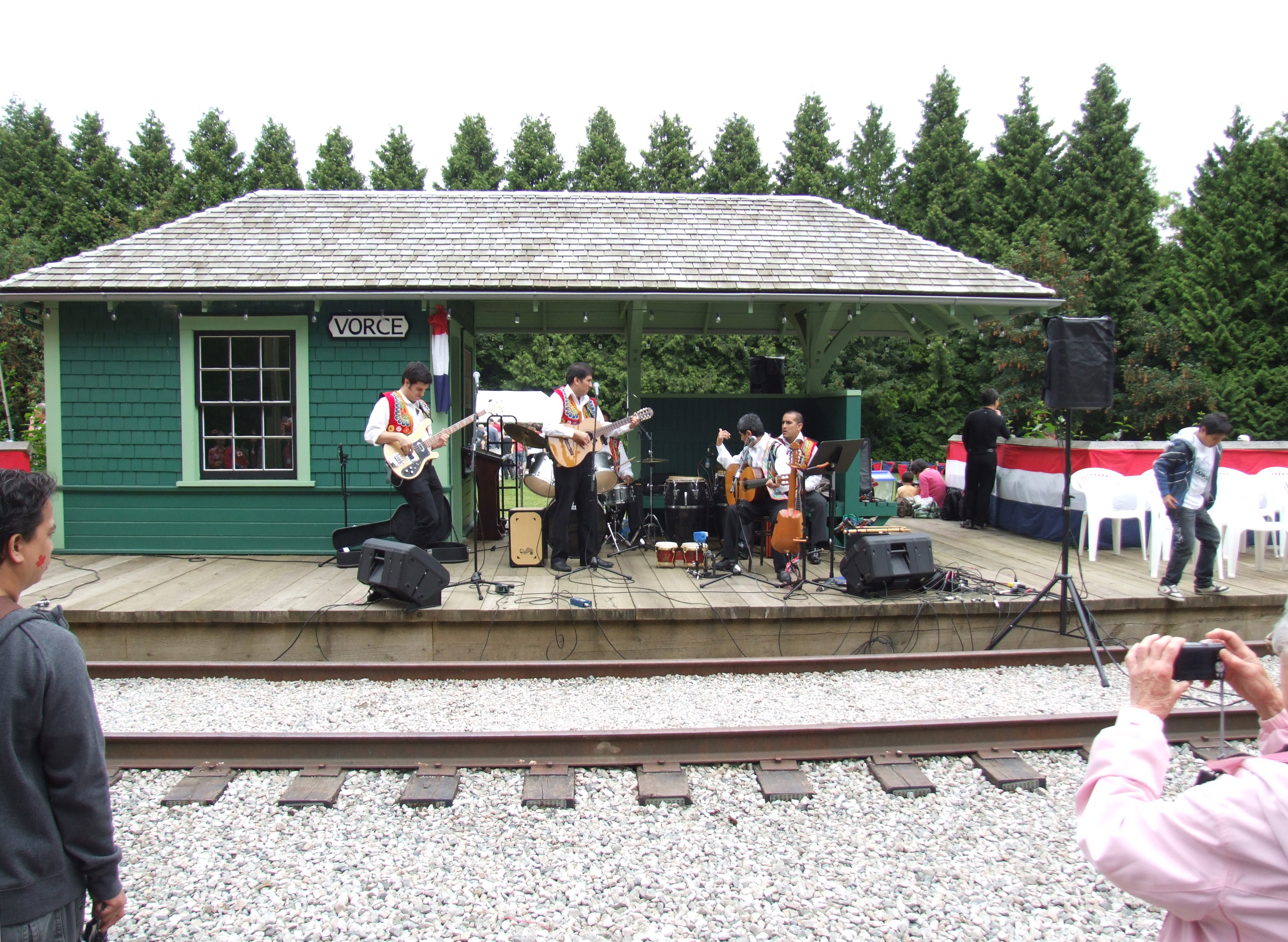
Vorce Station is a modest utilitarian passenger tram shelter, originally constructed at the foot of Nursery Street in Burnaby BC as part of the British Columbia Electric Railway Company's Burnaby Lake Interurban Line. In 1977, it was relocated to the grounds of the Burnaby Village Museum.

==== Burnaby Lake Line ====
Construction on the Burnaby Lake interurban line began in October, 1909, and the line officially opened on February 27, 1911. Regular service started on June 12, 1911. As part of the removal of streetcars in New Westminster, the line was cut back on August 9, 1937. Instead of running directly to the depot in New West, the line was cut by 2.4-miles to a new terminus at Sapperton.

The Burnaby Lake line's right-of-way is largely taken up by the Trans-Canada Highway, but sections of it survive as walking and biking trails.

==== New Westminster–Queensborough ====
Regular service began on September 16, 1912. The tracks from New Westminster to Queensborough and the 'Railway Bridge' across the north arm of the Fraser River are still in operation today, as part of the Southern Railway of British Columbia. Service ended on August 1, 1937.

==== Victoria–Deep Bay ====
Now called Deep Cove, the Victoria to Deep Cove line began regular interurban service on June 19, 1913. It was one of three passenger railways to serve the Saanich Peninsula, and was closed on November 1, 1924, due to low ridership. The Victoria-Deep Cove interurban's alignment can be traced by Burnside Road, Interurban Road and the Interurban Rail Trail, West Saanich Road, Wallace Drive, Aldous Terrace, Mainwaring Road, one of Victoria International Airport's runways, and Tatlow Road to Deep Cove. Besides the stretch through the airport, the stretch at the Experimental Farm (now called the Sidney/Centre for Plant Health) has also been blocked.

=== Exurban lines ===
==== New Westminster–Fraser Mills ====
Opened on June 10, 1912, construction of ramps leading to and from the new Pattullo Bridge resulted in the closure of the Queensborough and Fraser Mills lines in 1937, as well as the truncation of the Burnaby Lake line to Sapperton.

==== Stave Lake ====
On January 20, 1920, the BCER purchased the Western Power Company of Canada Limited, who owned an eight-year-old railway between Ruskin and Stave Falls. The BCER electrified the line by 1922. A 6-mile (9.7 km) steam train branch line, the Stave Falls Branch, (constructed during the building of the original Stave Falls hydroelectric plant) was isolated from the main interurban network, and linked the power plant and community at Stave Falls to the Canadian Pacific Railway station at Ruskin. The line was abandoned on December 4, 1944. The route of the Stave Falls Branch along Hayward Lake is also now a walking trail managed by BC Hydro and the District of Mission, with sections of it south of Ruskin Dam used as local powerline and neighbourhood walking trails.

==== Port Moody–Coquitlam ====
The Port Moody-Coquitlam Railway connected the Port Moody – Ioco spur of the Canadian Pacific Railway to the Coquitlam Dam in order to haul supplies and materials to the dam.

==== Alouette Lake ====
Similar to the Stave Lake and Port Moody-Coquitlam lines, the Alouette Lake dam tracks connected power facilities to the CPR that ran on the north side of the Fraser River at Kanaka Creek in Haney.

==== Jordan River ====
This 5.3-mile railway connected the powerhouse and harbour at the mouth of the Jordan River to the Jordan River Dam.

== "Rails-to-Rubber" transition ==
BCER ended streetcar service in New Westminster on the morning of December 5, 1938. As more of New Westminster's residents were living outside of streetcar service areas, the company converted completely to motor busses, with the interurban lines being the only remaining rail transit in the city. Trolley poles, wires, and tracks were removed from Columbia Street.

The company announced its "Rails-to-Rubber" conversion program on September 30, 1944. The conversion would last 10 years and convert the entirety of the BCER's rail systems to rubber-tired buses. North Vancouver's last streetcar service and two of Vancouver's streetcar lines ended in April 1947, and Victoria's streetcar service ended on July 4, 1948. In Vancouver, many streetcar lines were converted to trolley buses, with the first route of BCER's Vancouver trolley bus system, Fraser-Cambie, opening on August 16, 1948.

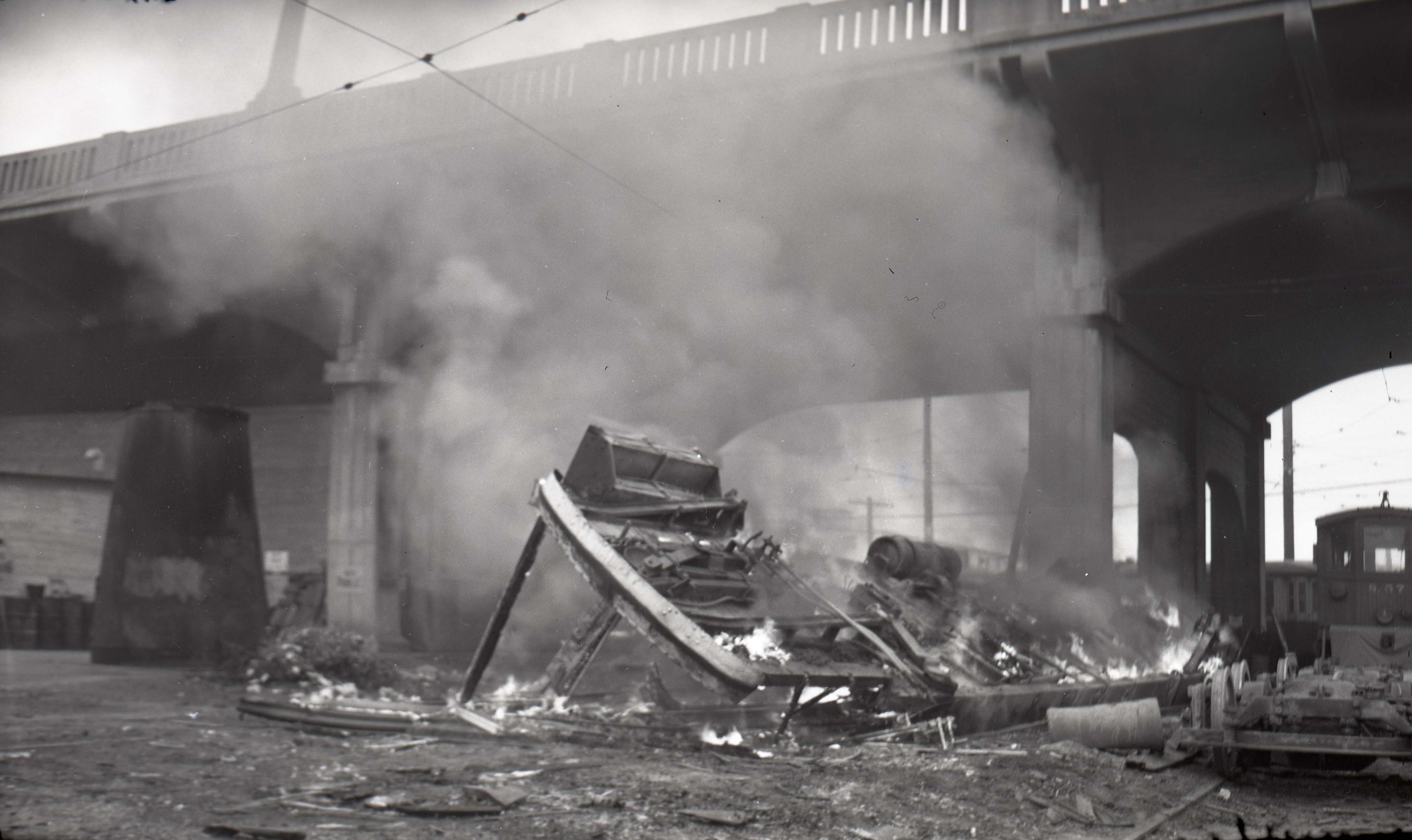
Streetcar being burned under the Burrard Bridge, ca. 1945.

The move from rail to rubber was influenced by several factors. The costs to maintain the aging rail infrastructure was estimated to be large, and the cost to switch to vehicles that relied mostly on already freshly paved streets enticed the company. Additionally, the automotive industry offered Vancouver officials favourable deals for rubber-tired vehicles in exchange for an explicit guarantee that the BCER would burn their streetcars at the end of service. The auto companies justified this requirement as they did not want the streetcars to be sold used to other streetcar systems in North America, where they could compete with rubber-tired busses. This practice of burning retired streetcars was common throughout North America.

Interurban lines ceased operations later, with the Chilliwack line ending in 1950, followed by the Vancouver-Marpole line in 1952 and the Burnaby Lake line in 1953. The stretch of the Central Park line in Burnaby and New Westminster was closed on October 23, 1953, followed by the rest of the line through Vancouver on July 16, 1954. The last streetcar line in Vancouver, the 14 Hastings East, ran on April 22, 1955. The Marpole-New Westminster interurban line was closed in November 1956, followed by the Marpole-Steveston line on February 28, 1958, marking the complete closure of the interurban system.

=== Provincial takeover ===
On August 1, 1961, the provincial government expropriated BC Electric, with the railway becoming a division of Crown corporation BC Hydro. Freight rail operations continued under the name BC Hydro Rail. On April 1, 1980, bus operations split from BC Hydro and come under the control of the Urban Transit Authority and Metro Operating Company. On May 10, 1983, the British Columbia Electric Railway Company Limited was formally dissolved.

In August 1988, BC Hydro sold their freight division which included rolling stock and rails and the rights to run freight trains through Fraser Valley Subdivision, not the corridor, to a company known as Itel of Chicago who resold it to a new shortline operator and the railway is now known as the Southern Railway of British Columbia and is exclusively a freight railway.

At the time, BC Hydro did not specifically reserve rights to operate passenger rail service using Southern Railway of British Columbia's facilities, but did retain the ability to grant operating rights to others, including to providers of passenger rail service, that do not materially interfere with Southern Railway of British Columbia's operations.

In addition, BC Hydro in 1988 also sold the track assets of a section between Cloverdale from Pratt Junction through Langley City and beyond to CP Rail, but retained ownership of the right-of-way. At the time, BC Hydro also granted CPR a statutory right-of-way to use this section of the corridor in perpetuity, but put agreements in place to retain partial running rights for passenger service, which were renewed in 2009.

While there has been a number proposals regarding the restart of a commuter passenger rail service along the line, a review was conducted by the British Columbia Ministry of Transportation and Infrastructure in 2010. The review noted issues around high cost per ride and low projected ridership relative to bus alternatives.

Subsequently, TransLink conducted a study as part of the 2010–2012 Surrey Rapid Transit Study to explore merits of utilizing the Interurban corridor for fast, frequent, and reliable rapid transit service. The interurban corridor was not selected, nor recommended for further consideration because the corridor does not directly connect relevant regional destinations of Surrey Central and Langley City, resulted in less attractive travel times between key destinations, and would require significant capital investments to meet safety requirements and reliability objectives compared to alternatives.

In particular, TransLink noted that the routing of the interurban line does not directly connect to the largest regional centre in the South of Fraser – Surrey Metro Centre – which is expected to be the focus of future population and employment growth, and the current alignment is indirect and through lower density and diverse areas, with a low ridership catchment near potential stations. Also, TransLink estimated that the interurban estimated travel times are not competitive with rapid transit along Fraser Highway or King George Boulevard, with transit times estimated to be around 63 minutes to travel between Langley and Surrey Central, which is double that of a possible bus rapid transit line or a Skytrain route along the Fraser Highway. Finally, TransLink has indicated that freight traffic along the line is expected to increase along the corridor, due to increased traffic at the Port of Metro Vancouver, in particular the Roberts Bank Superport.

== Accidents and regulations ==
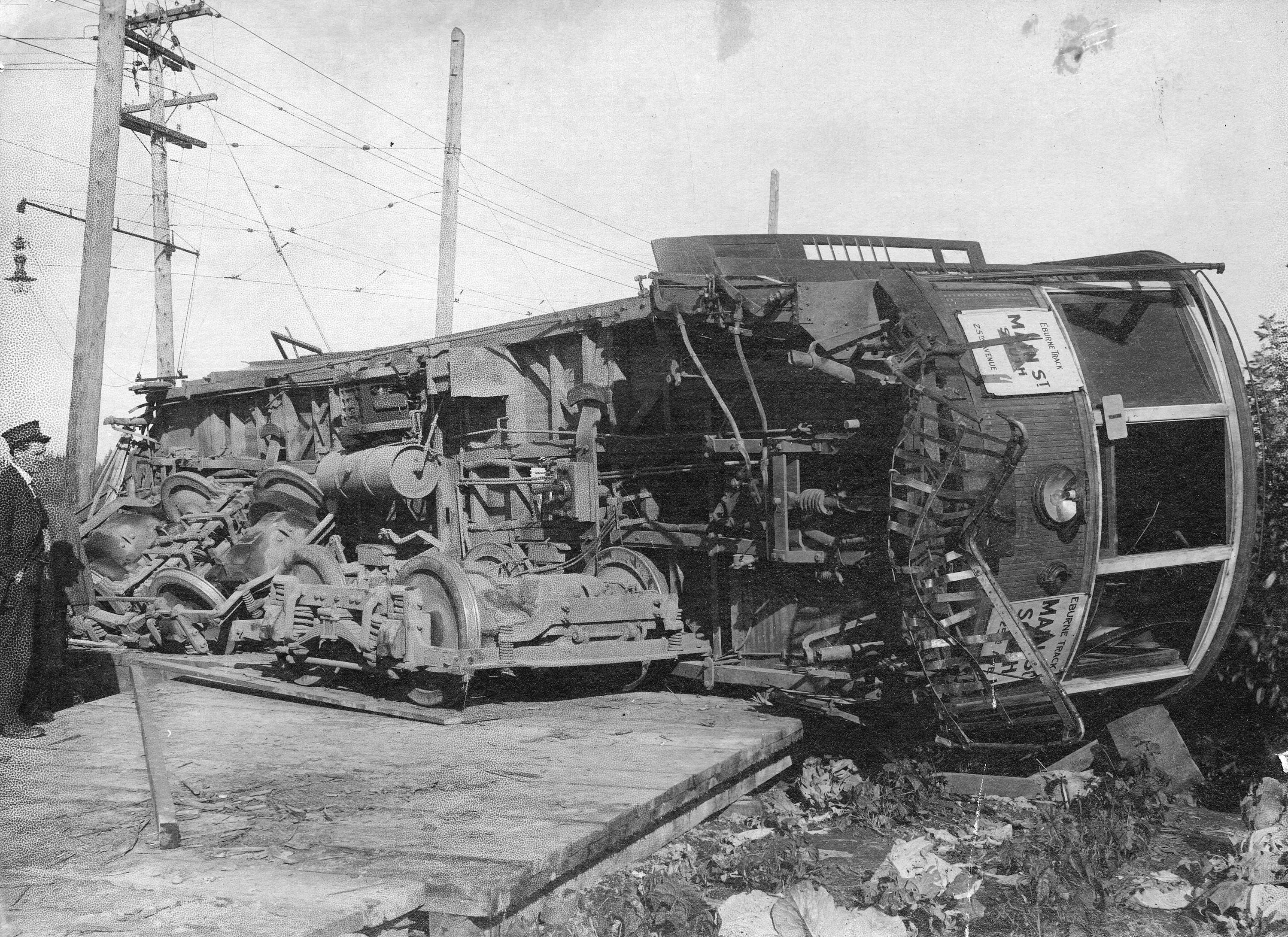
Overturned BCER streetcar at the foot of Main Street south, 1912.

Frequent accidents occurred in the early years of the BC Electric Railway. A report published by the Department of Railways in 1917 lists a total of 29 deaths throughout the BCER system in just five years, from 1911 to 1915 inclusive.

In September 1898, a woman suffered a broken arm after a streetcar was derailed after hitting a cow, she sued for $5,000.

On December 6, 1903, two men were injured following a collision between streetcars 34 and 38 due to thick fog. Another accident occurred when several boys released the brakes on a heavily loaded rail car parked on a spur line off the steep track on Main St south from 59th avenue. The car broke loose and collided with a streetcar, killing several passengers.

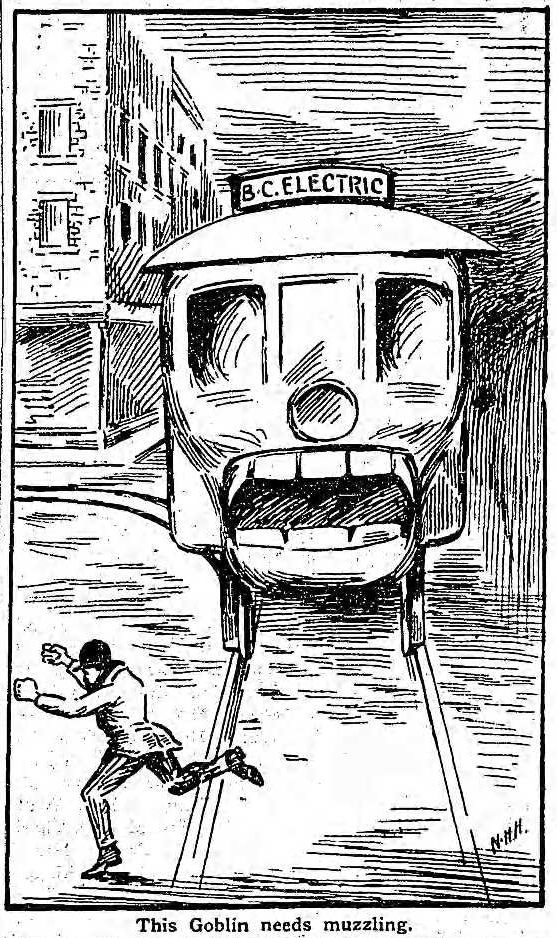
Cartoon featured in the BC Saturday Sunset on November 9, 1907. The accompanying article argues in favour of installing fenders on streetcars to prevent deaths.

In 1909, the brakes failed on North Vancouver streetcar number 62, causing the vehicle to run off track at the end of Londsdale and crash into the Burrard Inlet. The motorman and two passengers jumped to safety before the car flew into the water at the edge of a wharf. The vehicle's conductor urged the remaining passengers, including the wife of North Vancouver's mayor, to stay on board. Nobody was injured aside from the motorman who broke his leg.

In September 1945, interurban car number 1304 caught fire due to a short circuit while in service toward Cloverdale station. The crews evacuated the car and sped it toward Cloverdale station where the fire was put out. The train was rebuilt and returned to regular service.

=== The Lakeview Disaster ===
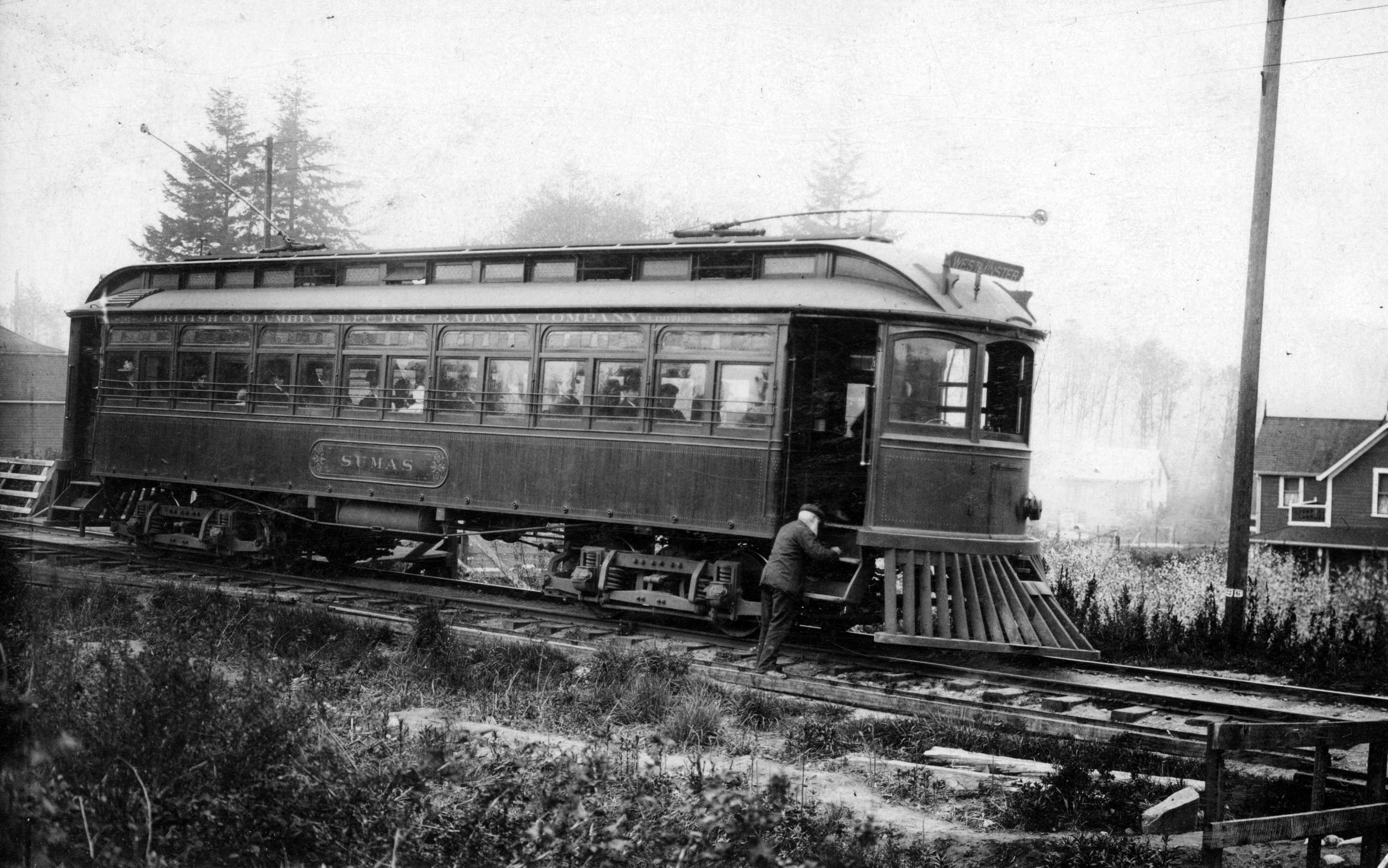
BCER car "Sumas" at the Lakeview Station on the Central Park line, 1903. This same car would be involved in the deadly Lakeview disaster 6 years later in 1909.

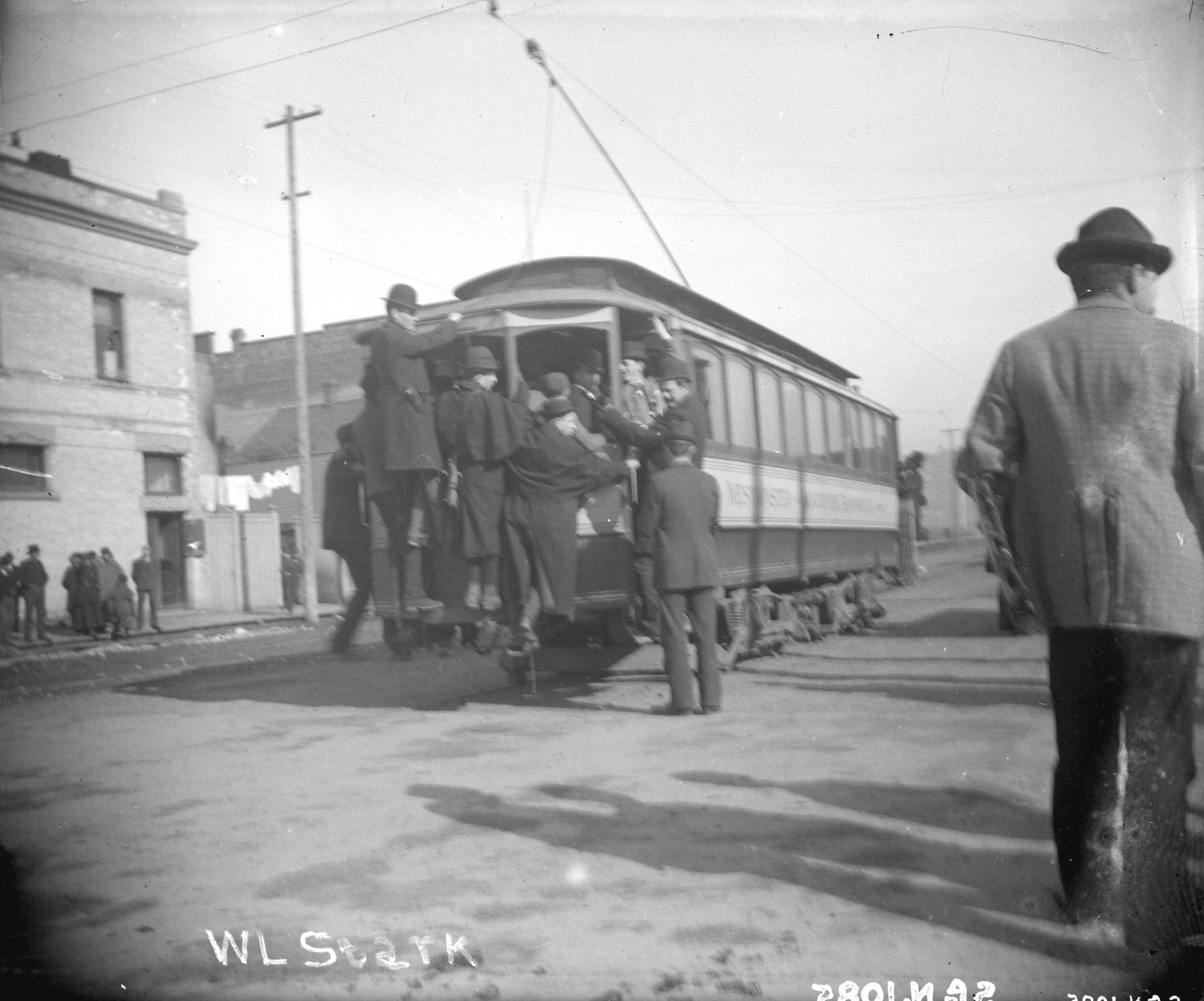
People hanging on to back of BCER streetcar, 1896. Laws introduced in 1911 aimed at preventing this kind of dangerous riding.

In the early morning of November 10, 1909, BCER interurban car "Sumas" collided with a runaway flatcar carrying lumber at Lakeview Train Station. Fourteen people were killed immediately and one died later of their injuries. The cars remaining nine passengers were gravely injured. The Lakeview Disaster remains the worst public transit disaster in Vancouver.

Criminal charges were brought against the crew of the BCER train but were ultimately dropped. BCER voluntarily gave $135,000 to the families of the deceased and injured. This incident motivated BC residents, led by the Vancouver Trades and Labor Council, to seek greater oversight of interuban lines. In 1910, the BC provincial legislature passed the Tramsways Inspection Act, the first regulation regarding transit service safety in BC. The act allowed BC's governor general to appoint an inspector who could reject any passenger or freight cars they deemed unsafe for service. The inspector was also to monitor overcrowding on streetcars. In 1911, the BC Attorney General ordered several regulatory changes to end overcrowding. These changes included outlawing standing on Fraser Valley line interurbans, resulting in necessary use of multi-car trains to provide more room for seated passengers. Interurbans were also required to have a separate compartment for mail and parcels. Passengers would also be barred from riding on the bumpers and outside steps of streetcars or interurbans. Streetcars were fitted with wooden exterior ledges and sloped beveled tin bumpers to prevent passengers from standing in the unsafe areas. New rules were also aimed at BCER staff. Streetcar operators were now required to take a sight and hearing test. Furthermore, cars had to display a "car full" sign before becoming overcrowded, and a gate would be used to make the platform inaccessible when there was no room for additional passengers. A car was determined as being "full" when all seats were taken and one person was standing four every four square feet of standing room.

=== Regulations ===
1910 saw the beginnings of regulations for the BCER. Following the Lakeview disaster of 1909, the Vancouver Trades and Labor Council successfully campaigned for a tramway inspector to be appointed by the BC government to enforce safety laws. When the BCER later removed special ticket privileges, essentially raising streetcar ticket prices, groups such as the South Vancouver Board of Trade, the Conservative Ward Clubs, and some members of the Vancouver Board of Trade began campaigning for the creation of a public utilities commission (PUC). The idea was officially endorsed when the Royal Commission on Municipal Government proposed the creation of a public service commission to compel utilities to provide sufficient service at sensible rates. Debate arose within the provincial cabinet, with Attorney-General W.J. Bowser supporting regulation, and Premier Richard McBride being sympathetic to the desires of the BCER. McBride promised the company that he would not introduce legislation to create a PUC during the 1914 legislative session, and later advising the company that legislation was not likely until 1916. McBride also assured the company that legislation would not be introduced without the company being able to comment on the draft version. The BCER's Board of Directors viewed a PUC as something that was inevitable, and even desirable as an alternative to municipal competition or other legislation. The BCER's negative view on regulation changed with the advent of the jitney in 1914. Previously seeing regulation as something that could harm the business, they now saw it as something that could protect them from what they saw as unfair competition. The company believed a PUC would be more understanding and reasonable to deal with than a political council such as the Legislature or cities. The BCER re-organized their methods of bookkeeping in an effort to reduce their reserve funds to obscure their sizable profits from light and power. By the spring of 1915, after preparing their own favourable draft legislation based on pre-existing utility laws elsewhere, the BC-based management of the BCER were open to a PUC. The BCER did not want to ask for the creation of a PUC however, as they and BC Telephone Company agreed that asking for the creation of a PUC would make them unable to protest against unfavourable legislation or political assignments to the commission. However, once the BCER management realized the Conservative government was preoccupied and unlikely to introduce new legislation due to prohibition, the Great Eastern Railway, and its own financial problems, the BCER began publicly advocating for the creation of a PUC in April 1916.

In June 1917, streetcar workers went on strike. The BCER claimed they could not pay higher wages due to the competition with jitneys. The city of Vancouver suggested that the province appoint a commission to investigate the issue, to which the BCER and province agreed in hopes of preventing an electrical workers strike. The province accepted that Dr. Adam Shortt, chairman of the federal Civil Service Commission, as the commissioner. Shortt made several recommendations, including advising the province to establish a PUC, as he believed it would be beneficial to both the public at large and the BCER. Premier Harlan Carey Brewster endorsed the idea and was willing to establish a PUC. BC Tel and the BCER attempted to persuade the government to appoint an outsider to prepare the PUC legislation, such as Shortt or James Mavor. The BCER was reassured by Premier John Oliver and Attorney-General J.W. de B. Farris that, following the decision to establish a PUC, the BCER would be able to view and suggest alterations to the draft bill. The government accepted a proposal from the BCER to postpone any changes in streetcar fares or lighting rates until the PUC could investigate the issue, effectively extending their six-cent fare from July 1918 to April 8, 1919. The government also agreed to hear objections from the BCER, leading Conservative leader of the opposition, W.J. Bowser, to call the bill once presented to Legislature "very much mangled". Historian Patricia E. Roy stated that the company had essentially "created their own regulations". The company held a special meeting with its British shareholders to celebrate the creation of the PUC, and advertised its creation in sixty English newspapers. Most BC MLAs were satisfied with the Act, and even Conservative opposition accepted it in a general basis. The main principle being that rates charged to the public for service, as well as the BCER's rate of return, be fare, equitable, and respectable.

The BCER wanted to have a neutral commissioner chosen to lead the PUC. When John Oliver told the BCER of the plan to choose Vancouver's mayor R. H. Gale, as the commissioner, who had a history of fighting with the BCER, the company objected. Other organizations joined the BCER in protest against Gale's intended appointment, eventually pressuring Oliver to replace him with Major John Ley Retallack. Retallack became the first commissioner of BC's first PUC on April 21, 1919.

== Remaining vehicles ==
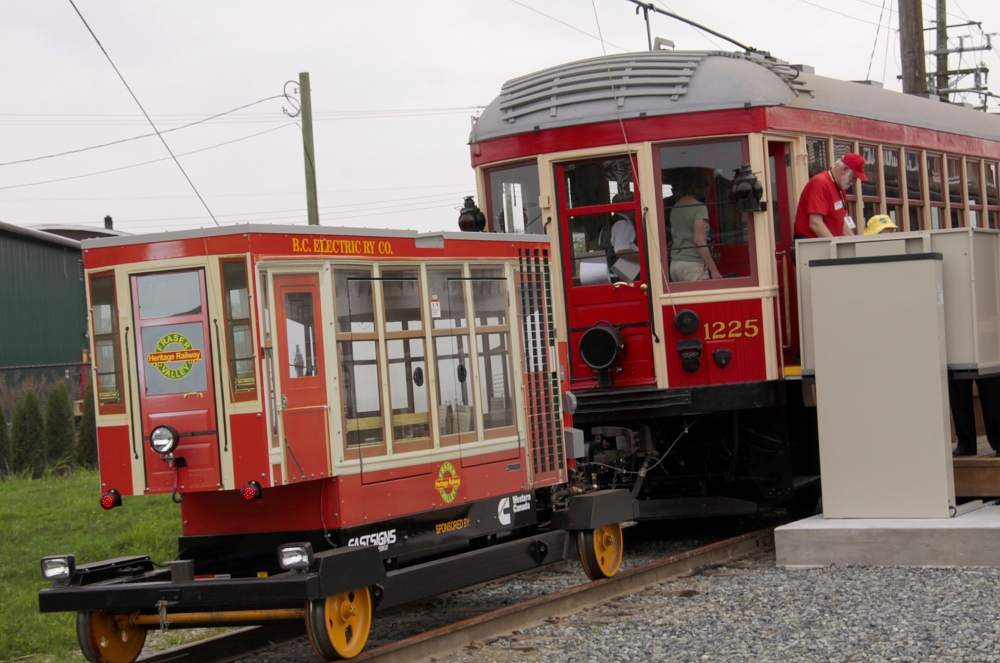
Restored BCER interurban car at the Fraser Valley Heritage Railway Society in Surrey, BC. This restored car does not use a trolley-pole, instead powered by a generator towed on a small flatcar.

After the decommission of the BCER streetcar and interurban system, most of the cars were either scrapped or burned underneath the Burrard Bridge, but some cars were sold for various other uses such as becoming bunkhouses, storage sheds and in some cases decor. A handful of cars were also donated to various museums mostly in the U.S. Since then however, several preservation societies have bought back the cars and begun restoring them. The following is a list of the known BCER cars in existence and their current locations.

=== Streetcars ===
- # 53 Built in 1904, operated in Vancouver, on permanent static display inside The Old Spaghetti Factory restaurant in Gastown, Vancouver, BC.
- # 153 Built in 1908, operated in North Vancouver, currently on display at the Museum of North Vancouver (MoNoVa), North Vancouver, BC.
- # 400 Built in 1922, operated in Victoria, now located at the Nelson Electric Tramway Society in Nelson, BC.

=== Interurban cars ===
- # 1207 Built in 1905, operated on the Marpole–Steveston Line, was located at the Downtown Historic Railway in Vancouver, BC. As of January 2016, it has been relocated to the Fraser Valley Heritage Railway Society, Surrey, BC.
- # 1220 Built in 1913, operated on the Marpole–Steveston Line, currently on display at the Steveston Tram Museum, Richmond, BC.
- # 1223 Built in 1913, operated on the Burnaby Lake Line, on static display at the Burnaby Village Museum, Burnaby, BC.
- # 1225 Built in 1913, operated on the Marpole–Steveston and Burnaby Lake Lines, currently in operation at the Fraser Valley Heritage Railway Society, Surrey, BC.
- # 1231 Built in 1913, operated on the Marpole–Steveston and Burnaby Lake Lines, currently under restoration at the Fraser Valley Heritage Railway Society, Surrey, BC.
- # 1235 Built in 1913, operated on the Marpole–Steveston Line, located at the Canada Science and Technology Museum, Ottawa, ON
- # 1304 Built in 1911, operated on the Fraser Valley – Chilliwack Line, currently in operation at the Fraser Valley Heritage Railway Society, Surrey, BC.
- #1311, operated on the Chilliwack Line, preserved in Squamish, and prepared for transfer to Ottawa along with #1235, however, it was vandalized, and therefore scrapped. This car is included in the list for having survived being burnt.

Additionally, switcher/maintenance car #960 is on display at the BC Railway Museum in Squamish, British Columbia.

=== Busses ===
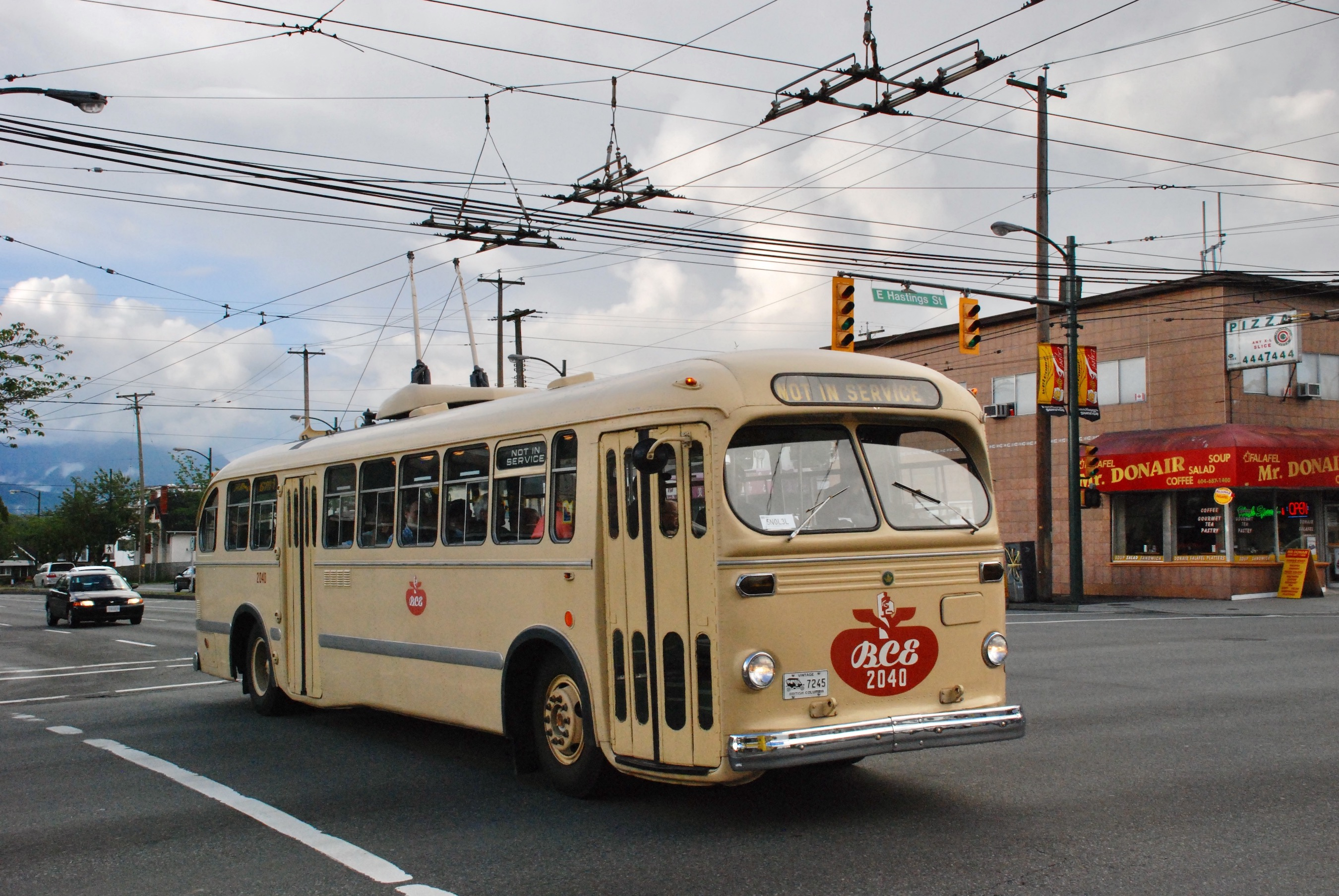
One of BCER's first trolleybuses, 1947-built No. 2040, has been preserved, and is shown operating in 2010

The Transit Museum Society has the following BC Electric busses in restored and working order.

- 1937 Hayes "Teardrop" Model PCT-32, Pacific Stage Lines #63.
- 1947 Canadian Car-Brill Model T-44 trolley coach, B. C. Electric #2040.
- 1947 Fageol Twin Coach Model 41S, B. C. Electric. #M852.
- 1954 Canadian Car-Brill Model T-48A trolley coach, B.C. Hydro #2416.
- 1957 Canadian Car-Brill Model CD-52-TC, BC Hydro #3404.
- 1957 Canadian Car-Brill CD-52-TC, BC Electric #3405.
- 1957 General Motors TDH-4512 BC Electric #730.
- 1964 General Motors TDH-4519, BC Hydro #4612.

== Notable employees ==
- Boris Karloff - Actor who earned $2.50 a day as a general labourer for the BCER. His work included laying tracks, digging ditches, working with surveyors, shoveling coal, and land clearing.
- John Price - Canadian politician who served as a motorman for the BCER.
- Herbert Anscomb - Politician and accountant who was employed for some time with the BCER.
- Harold James Merilees - Advertising executive and politician who joined the BCER in 1931 and became manager of the Public Information Department.
- Wilfred Talbot Smith - Thelemite who got a job as an accounting clerk for the BCER in April 1912 in the Light and Billing Department.
- Charles Stansfeld Jones - Writer, occultist and magician who worked alongside Wilfred Talbot Smith.
- John Meredith Rockingham - Military officer who, after WWII, moved to Victoria to work as a personnel supervisor for the BCER in 1946. In 1949, he moved to Vancouver and worked as the Staff Assistant to the General Manager of Transportation at the BCER.
- Byron Ingemar "Boss" Johnson - BC Premier who served as director of the British Columbia Power Corporation Limited, the holding company for BCER.

== See also ==
- Trolleybuses in Vancouver
- Streetcars in North America
- Fraser Valley Heritage Railway Society (Non-profit that restores and operates BCER interurban cars)
- Nelson Electric Tramway (restoration/operation of a former BCER streetcar)
