= Streetcars in North America =

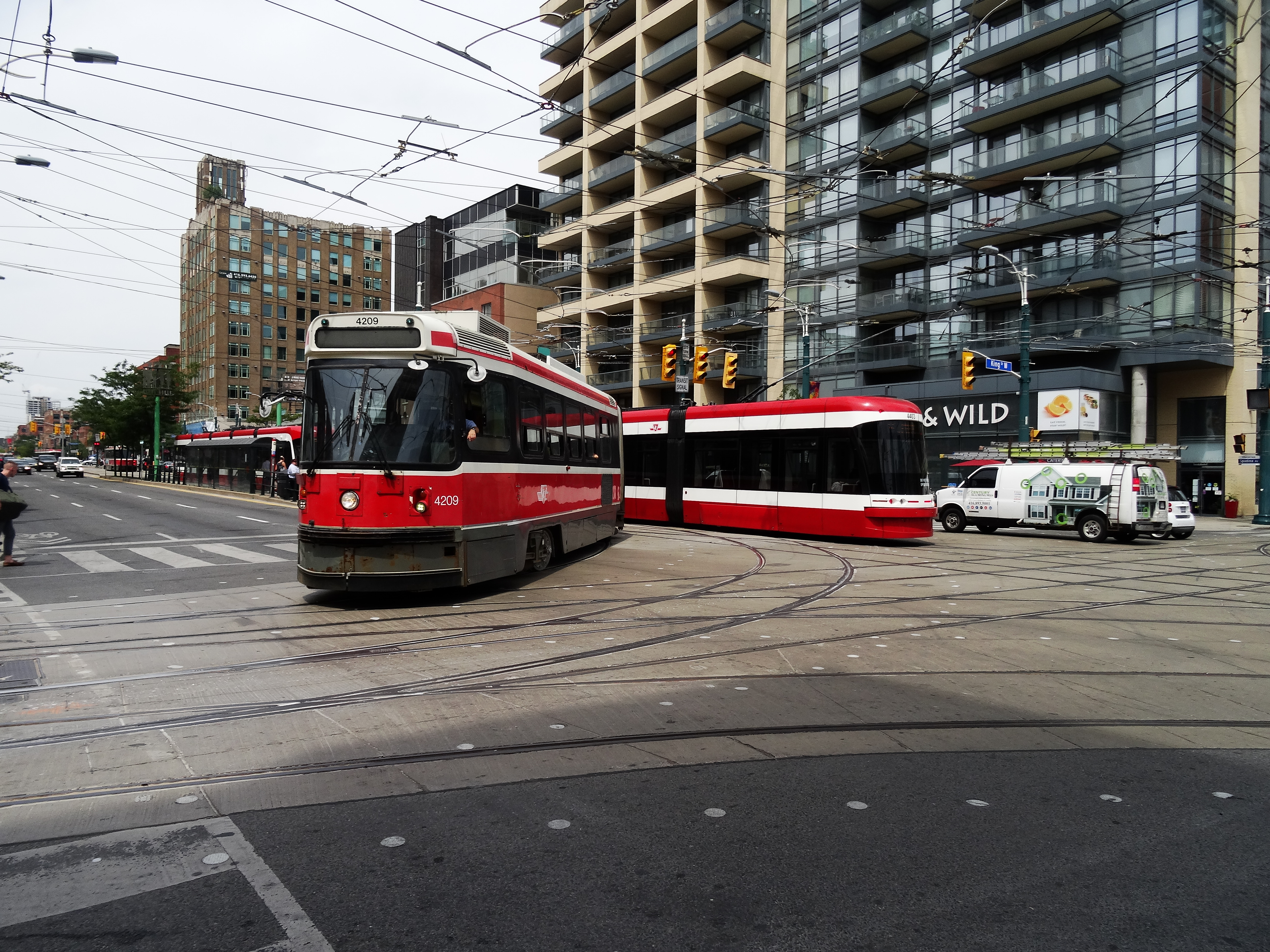
The Toronto Transit Commission maintains the most extensive system in the Americas (in terms of total track length, number of cars, and ridership).

Streetcars or trolley(car)s (American English for the European word tram) were once the chief mode of public transit in hundreds of North American cities and towns. Most of the original urban streetcar systems were either dismantled in the mid-20th century or converted to other modes of operation, such as light rail. Only Toronto still operates a streetcar network essentially unchanged in layout and mode of operation.

Older surviving lines and systems in Boston, Cleveland, Mexico City, Newark, Philadelphia, Pittsburgh, and San Francisco were often infrastructure-heavy systems with tunnels, dedicated right-of-way, and long travel distances. Most of these older streetcar systems are largely rebuilt as light rail systems. About 22 North American cities, starting with Edmonton, Calgary and San Diego, have installed new light rail systems, some of which run along historic streetcar corridors. A few recent cases feature mixed-traffic street-running operation like a streetcar. Portland, Oregon, Seattle, and Salt Lake City have built both modern light rail and modern streetcar systems, while Tucson, Oklahoma City and Atlanta have built new modern streetcar lines. A few other cities and towns have restored a small number of lines to run heritage streetcars either for public transit or for tourists; many are inspired by New Orleans' St. Charles Streetcar Line, generally viewed as the world's oldest continuously operating streetcar line.

== History ==
=== Omnibuses and horsecars ===
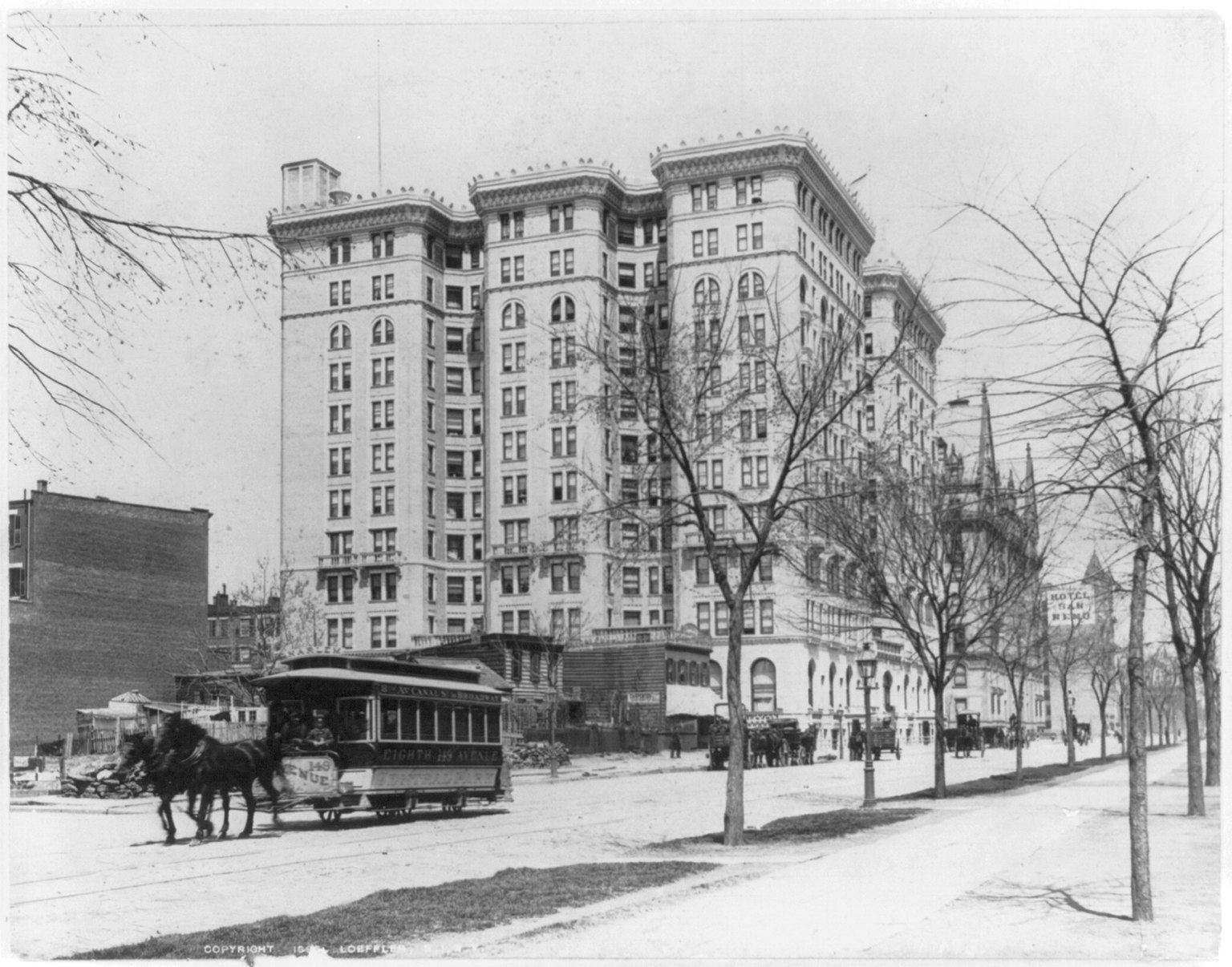
Horse-drawn streetcars in New York City in 1895. The first streetcar lines in North America were opened in New York City in 1832.

From the 1820s to the 1880s urban transit in North America began when horse-drawn omnibus lines started to operate along city streets. Examples included Gilbert Vanderwerken's 1826 omnibus service in Newark, New Jersey. Before long Omnibus companies sought to boost profitability of their wagons by increasing ridership along their lines. Horsecar lines simply ran wagons along rails set in a city street instead of on the unpaved street surface as the omnibus lines used. When a wagon was drawn upon rails the rolling resistance of the vehicle was lowered and the average speed was increased.

A horse or team that rode along rails could carry more fare paying passengers per day of operation than those that did not have rails. North America's first streetcar lines opened in 1832 from downtown New York City to Harlem by the New York and Harlem Railroad, in 1834 in New Orleans, and in 1849 in Toronto along the Williams Omnibus Bus Line.

These streetcars used horses and sometimes mules. Mules were thought to give more hours per day of useful transit service than horses and were especially popular in the south in cities such as New Orleans, Louisiana. In many cities, streetcars drawn by a single animal were known as "bobtail streetcars" whether mule-drawn or horse-drawn. By the mid-1880s, there were 415 street railway companies in the U.S. operating over 6,000 miles (9,700 km) of track and carrying 188 million passengers per year using animal-drawn cars. In the nineteenth century Mexico had streetcars in around 1,000 towns and many were animal-powered. The 1907 Anuario Estadístico lists 35 animal-powered streetcar lines in Veracruz state, 80 in Guanajuato, and 300 lines in Yucatán.

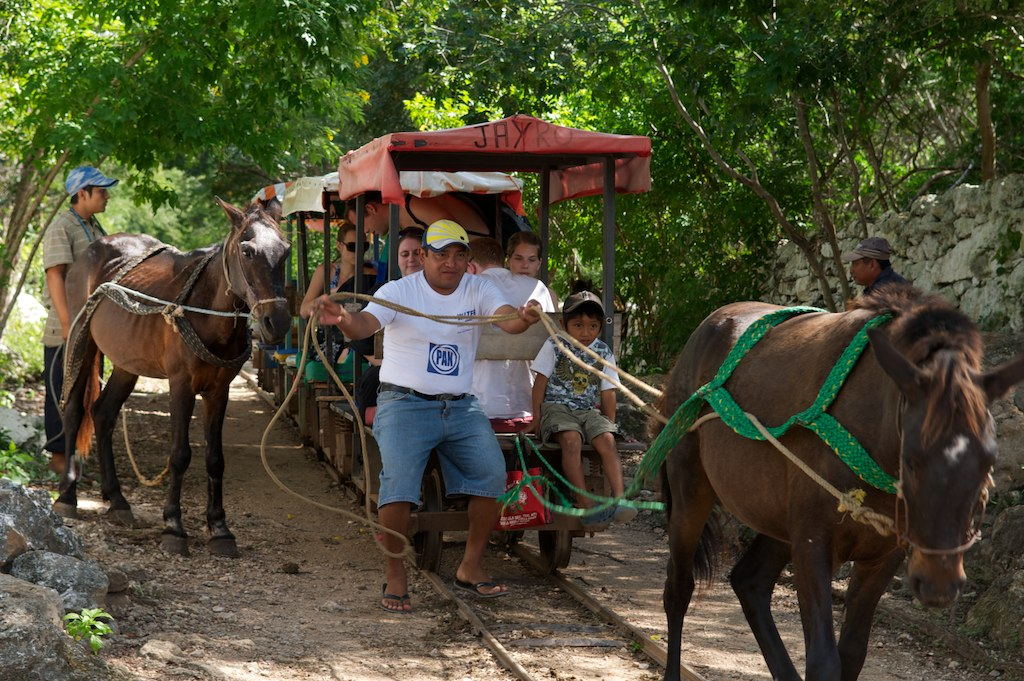
Horse-drawn Decauville "trucks" in Cuzamá, 2010. Horse-drawn streetcars are still used in Cuzamá.

Although most animal-drawn lines were shut down in the 19th century, a few lines lasted into the 20th century and later. Toronto's horse-drawn streetcar operations ended in 1891. New York City saw regular horsecar service last until 1917. In Pittsburgh, Pennsylvania, the Sarah Street line lasted until 1923. The last regular mule-drawn cars in the United States ran in Sulphur Rock, Arkansas, until 1926 and were commemorated by a U.S. Postage Stamp issued in 1983. The last mule tram service in Mexico City ended in 1932, and a mule-powered line in Celaya, survived until May 1954.

In the 21st century, horsecars are still used to take visitors along the 9-kilometre (5.6 mi) tour of the 3 cenotes from Chunkanán near Cuzamá Municipality in the state of Yucatán. Disneyland theme park in Anaheim, Cal., has operated a short horsecar line since it opened in July 1955. Similarly, Disney World theme park in Orlando has operated a short horsecar line since it opened in Oct 1971. At both parks, they run from 8-9am to 1:30-2pm, and, depending on the season, sometimes 5-7pm.

=== Early power ===
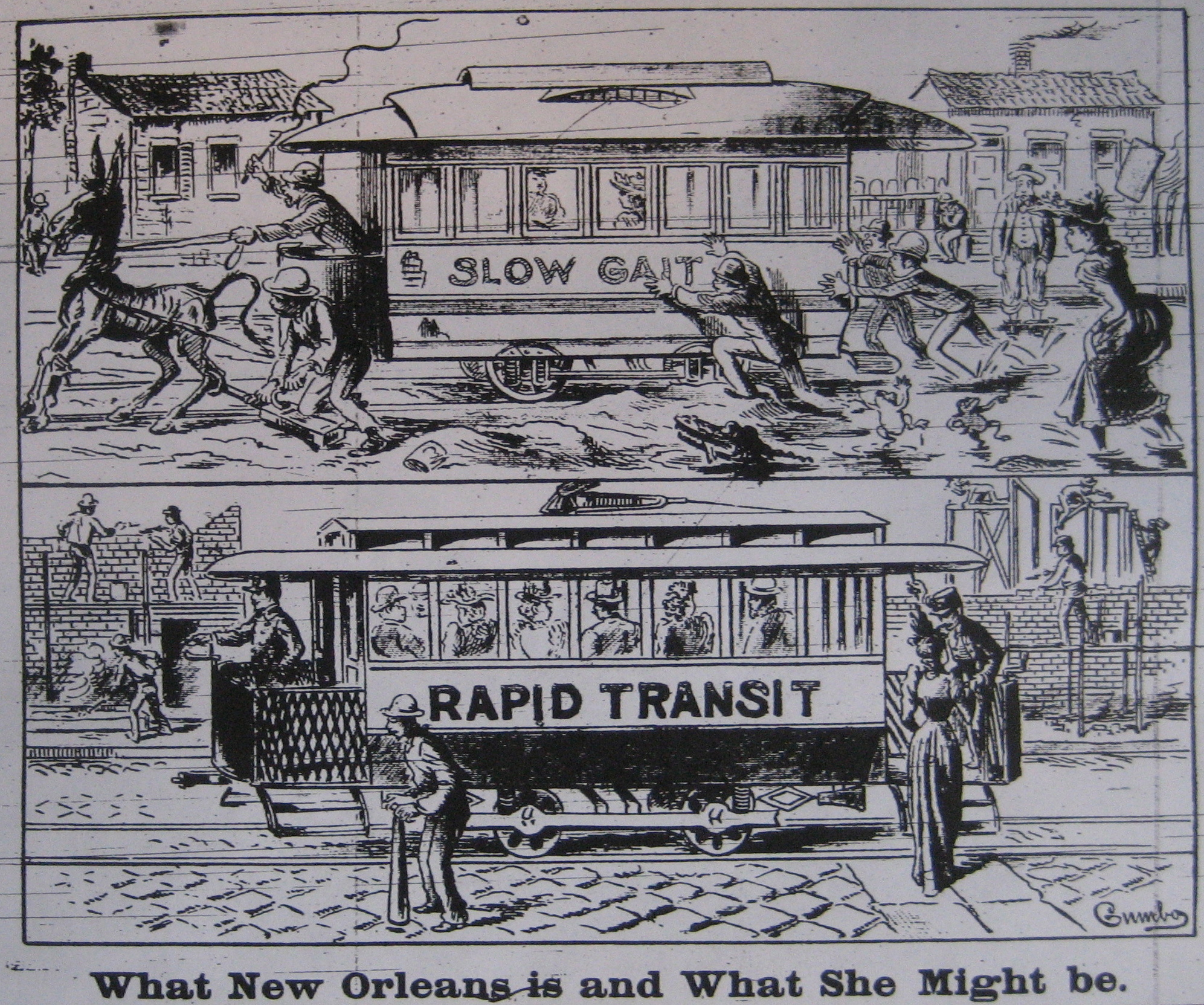
An editorial cartoon from New Orleans, advocating the switch from horsecars to electric streetcars, October 1893

During the nineteenth century, particularly from the 1860s to the 1890s, many streetcar operators switched from animals to other types of motive power. Before the use of electricity the use of steam dummies, tram engines, or cable cars was tried in several North American cities. A notable transition took place in Washington, D.C., in the U.S. where horsecars were used on street railways from 1862 to the early 1890s. From about 1890 to 1893 cable drives provided motive power to Washington streetcars, and after 1893 electricity powered the cars. The advantages of eliminating animal drive power included dispensing with the need to feed the animals and clean up their waste. A North American city that did not eliminate its cable car lines was San Francisco and much of its San Francisco cable car system continues to operate to this day.

In this transition period some early streetcar lines in large cities opted to rebuild their railways above or below grade to help further speed transit. Such system would become known as rapid transit or later as heavy rail lines.

=== Electrification ===
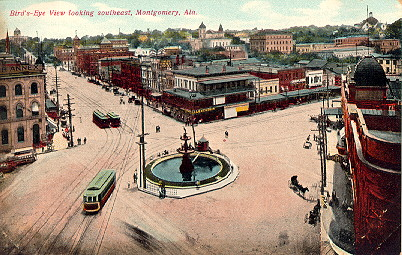
Three streetcars on the Lightning Route. Electric streetcars were introduced to Montgomery in 1886.

The World Cotton Centennial was held in New Orleans, Louisiana, from December 16, 1884, to June 2, 1885. It featured displays with a great deal of electric light illumination, an observation tower with electric elevators, and several prototype designs of electric streetcars. Montgomery, Alabama, established its electric streetcar system nicknamed the Lightning Route on April 15, 1886. Another early electrified streetcar system in the United States was established in Scranton, Pennsylvania, by November 30, 1886; it was the first system to be run exclusively on electric power, giving Scranton the nickname "The Electric City". In 1887 an electric streetcar line opened between Omaha and South Omaha, Nebraska. The Omaha Motor Railway Company began operation in 1888.

Along the east coast a large-scale electric street railway system known as the Richmond Union Passenger Railway was built by Frank J. Sprague in Richmond, Virginia, and was operating by February 2, 1888. The Richmond system had a large impact upon the burgeoning electric trolley industry. Sprague's use of a trolley pole for D.C. current pick up from a single line (with ground return via the street rails) set the pattern that was to be adopted in many other cities. The North American English use of the term "trolley" instead of "tram" for a street railway vehicle derives from the work that Sprague did in Richmond and quickly spread elsewhere.

Los Angeles built the largest electric tramway system in the world, which grew to over 1600 km of track. A horse-drawn tramway was commenced in L.A. in 1872. In the first decade of the 1900s, Henry Huntington was behind this development. Trams ran in the city as well as to outlying settlements. Lines radiated from the city as far south as Long Beach. Cars could be coupled, running in multiple-unit operation. All was abandoned by 1961.

=== Growth ===
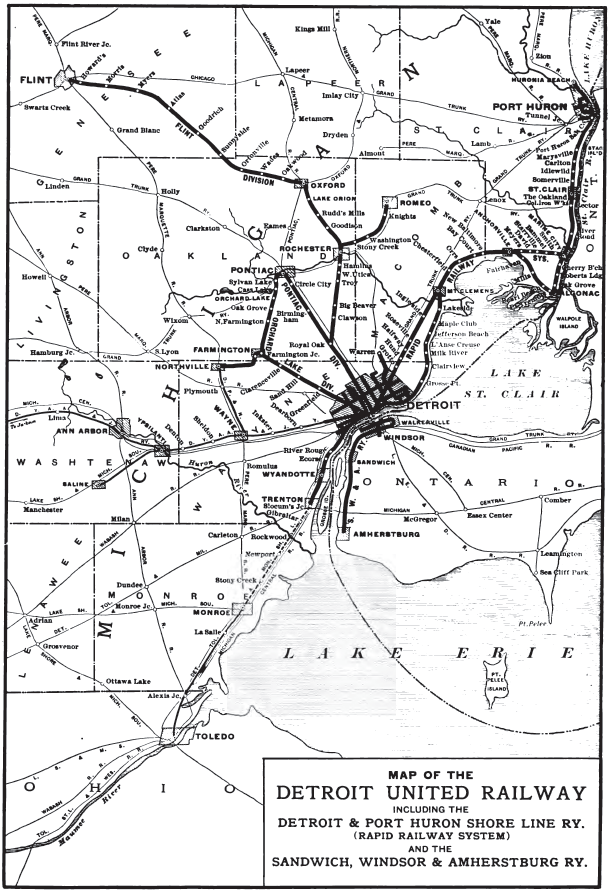
Map of Detroit United Railway streetcar and interurban lines. The rapid growth of streetcar systems in the late-19th century led to the development of streetcar suburbs in North America.

By 1889 110 electric railways incorporating Sprague's equipment had been started or were planned on several continents. By 1895 almost 900 electric street railways and nearly 11,000 miles (18,000 km) of track had been built in the United States.

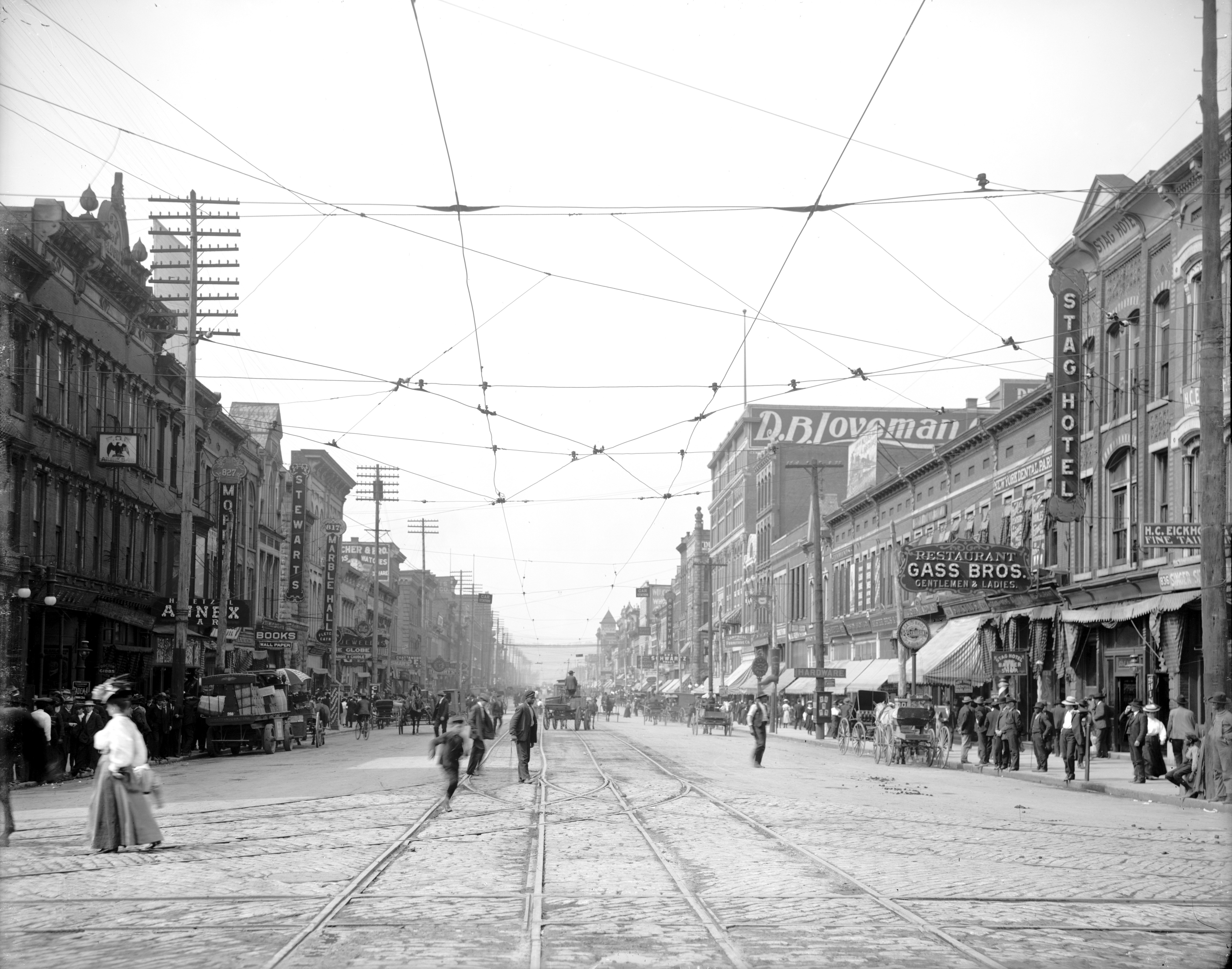
Streetcar rails and cables in Chattanooga, 1907

The rapid growth of streetcar systems led to the widespread ability of people to live outside of a city and commute into it for work on a daily basis. Several of the communities that grew as a result of this new mobility were known as streetcar suburbs. Another outgrowth of the popularity of urban streetcar systems was the rise of interurban lines, which were basically streetcars that operated between cities and served remote, even rural, areas. In some areas interurban lines competed with regular passenger service on mainline railroads and in others they simply complemented the mainline roads by serving towns not on the mainlines. The largest of these was the Pacific Electric system in Los Angeles, which had over 1,000 miles (1,600 km) of track and 2,700 scheduled services each day.

The Hagerstown and Frederick Railway that started in 1896 in northern Maryland was built to provide transit service to resorts and the streetcar company built and operated two amusement parks to entice more people to ride their streetcars. The Lake Shore Electric Railway interurban in northern Ohio carried passengers to Cedar Point and several other Ohio amusement parks. The Lake Compounce amusement park, which started in 1846, had by 1895 established trolley service to its rural Connecticut location. Although outside trolley service to Lake Compounce stopped in the 1930s, the park resurrected its trolley past with the "Lakeside Trolley" ride from 1997 to 2024, when the car was returned to the Shoreline Trolley Museum. In the days before widespread radio listening was popular and in towns or neighborhoods too small to support a viable amusement park streetcar lines might help to fund an appearance of a touring musical act at the local bandstand to boost weekend afternoon ridership.

Many of Mexico's streetcars were fitted with gasoline motors in the 1920s and some were pulled by steam locomotives. Only 15 Mexican streetcar systems were electrified in the 1920s.

=== Strikes ===
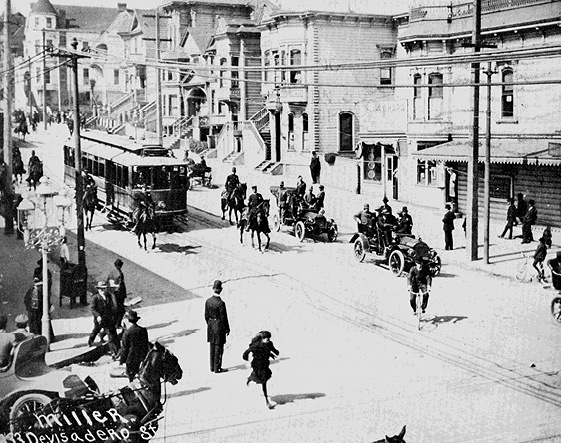
Police escorting a scab-driven streetcar during the San Francisco Streetcar Strike of 1907. A number of streetcar strikes broke out in the United States during the early 20th century.

Between 1895 and 1929, almost every major city in the United States suffered at least one streetcar strike. Sometimes lasting only a few days, more often these strikes were "marked by almost continuous and often spectacular violent conflict," at times amounting to prolonged riots and civil insurrection.

Streetcar strikes rank among the deadliest armed conflicts in American labor union history. Samuel Gompers of the American Federation of Labor called the St. Louis Streetcar Strike of 1900 "the fiercest struggle ever waged by the organized toilers" up to that point, with a total casualty count of 14 dead and about 200 wounded. The San Francisco Streetcar Strike of 1907 saw 30 killed and about 1000 injured. Many of the casualties were passengers and innocent bystanders.

The 1929 New Orleans streetcar strike was one of the last of its kind. The rise of private automobile ownership took the edge off its impact, as an article in the Chicago Tribune observed as early as 1915.

=== Decline ===
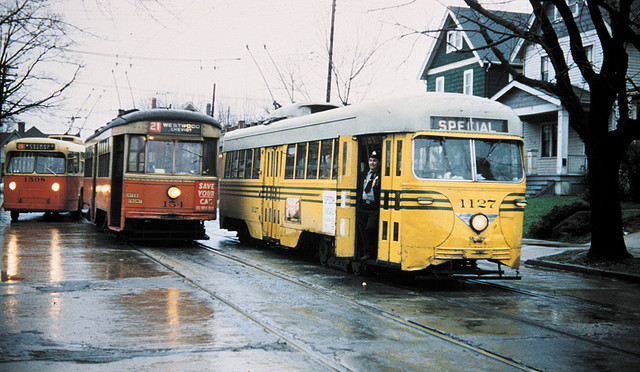
Two Cincinnati streetcars in April 1951, a week before streetcar service ended. Streetcars were replaced by trolleybuses (one of which is seen behind the streetcars).

The increased use of automobiles during the 1920s contributed to the decline of many streetcar lines in North America, and the decline continued during the Great Depression of the 1930s. The onset of World War II held off the closure of some streetcar lines as civilians used them to commute to war related factory jobs during a time when rubber tires and gasoline were rationed. After the war automobile use continued to rise and was assisted in the 1940s and 1950s by the passage of the Trans-Canada Highway Act of 1948 and growth of provincial highways in Canada as well as the Federal Aid Highway Act of 1956 in the United States.

By the 1960s most North American streetcar lines were closed, with only the exceptions noted above and discussed below remaining in service. During the same time all streetcar systems in Central America were scrapped as well. The survival of the lines that made it past the 1960s was aided by the introduction of the successful PCC streetcar (Presidents' Conference Committee car) in the 1940s and 1950s in all these cities except New Orleans.

City buses were seen as more economical and flexible: a bus could carry a number of people similar to that in a streetcar without tracks and associated infrastructure. Many transit operators removed some streetcar tracks but kept the electric infrastructure so as to run electrified trackless trolley buses. Many such systems lasted only as long as the first generation of equipment, but several survive to the present.

==== Purported conspiracies ====
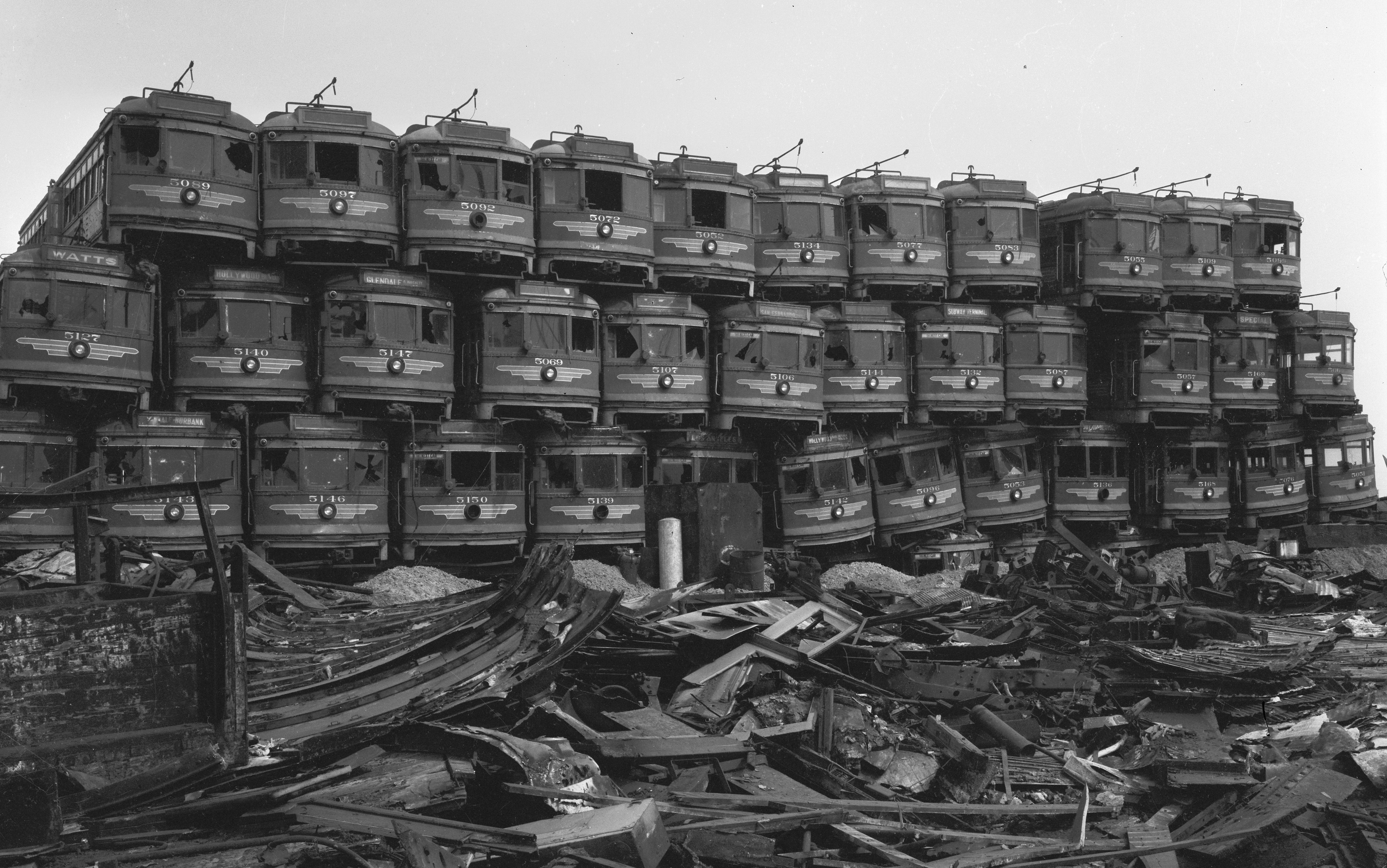
Pacific Electric Railway streetcars stacked at a junkyard on Terminal Island, March 1956

The abandonment of city streetcar systems in the mid-twentieth century led to accusations of conspiracy that held that a union of automobile, oil, and tire manufacturers shut down the streetcar systems to further the use of buses and automobiles. The struggling depression-era streetcar companies were bought up by this union of companies who, over the following decades, dismantled many of the North American streetcar systems.

While it is true that General Motors, Firestone Tire, Standard Oil of California, Phillips Petroleum, and some other companies funded holding companies that purchased about 30 more of the hundreds of transit systems across North America, their real goal was to sell their products — buses, tires, and fuel — to those transit systems as they converted from streetcars to buses. During the time the holding companies owned an interest in American transit systems, more than 300 cities converted to buses. The holding companies only owned an interest in the transit systems of less than fifty of those cities. GM and other companies were subsequently convicted in 1949 of conspiring to monopolize the sale of buses and related products via a complex network of linked holding companies including National City Lines and Pacific City Lines. They were also indicted, but acquitted of conspiring to monopolize the ownership of these companies. The former verdict was upheld on appeal in 1951.

=== Renaissance ===
==== Light rail ====
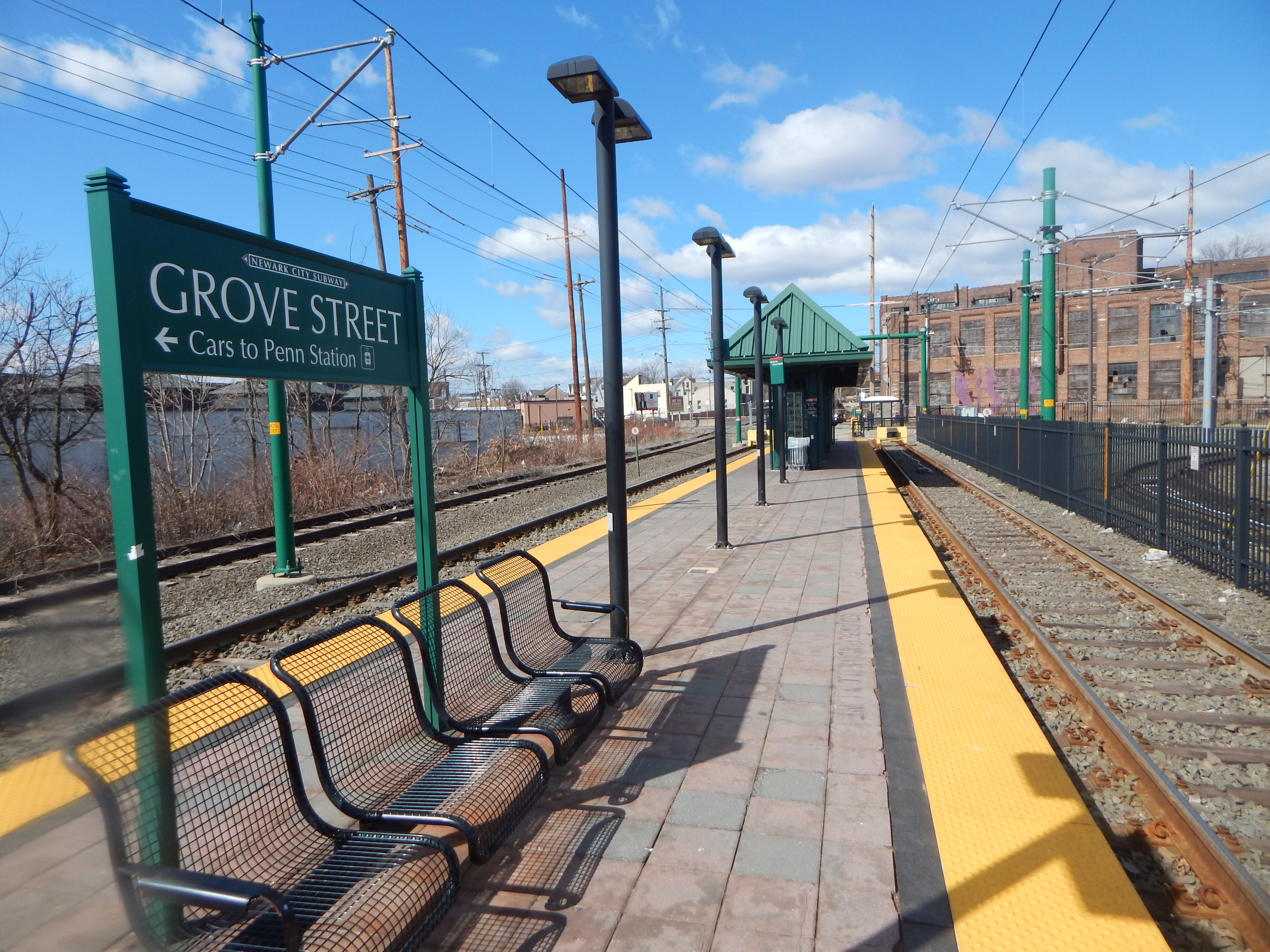
A Newark Light Rail station. As opposed to traditional streetcars, modern light rail systems typically run on reserved track, and often use railway platforms instead of street-level stops.

The systems described in the paragraphs above and below are genuine streetcars or tramways, with smaller vehicles and mixed-traffic street running (i.e. no separation from other vehicles), such as those in New Orleans and San Francisco. A greater number of North American cities have built light rail systems in recent decades, some of which operate partially in the right-of-way of city streets, but that mostly operate in exclusive rights-of-way. A few North American 'light rail' systems date to the "first" streetcar era, such as Boston's Green Line, Cleveland's Blue and Green Lines, Mexico City's light rail line, and the light rail system in Newark, New Jersey, and so can be considered "holdovers" or "legacies" from that era.

The term light rail was devised in 1972 by the Urban Mass Transportation Administration (UMTA; the precursor to the U.S. Federal Transit Administration) to describe new streetcar transformations that were taking place in Europe and being planned in North America. Some notable distinctions between light rail systems and their streetcar predecessors were that:

- Light rail lines may run at least partially along exclusive rights of way instead of only along or in streets (i.e. without street running).
- A light rail line is more likely to run multiple unit trains instead of single cars.
- A light rail line may use high level platforms instead of in street level stops. These design differences mean that light rail systems tend to have higher passenger capacities and higher speeds than their streetcar predecessors.

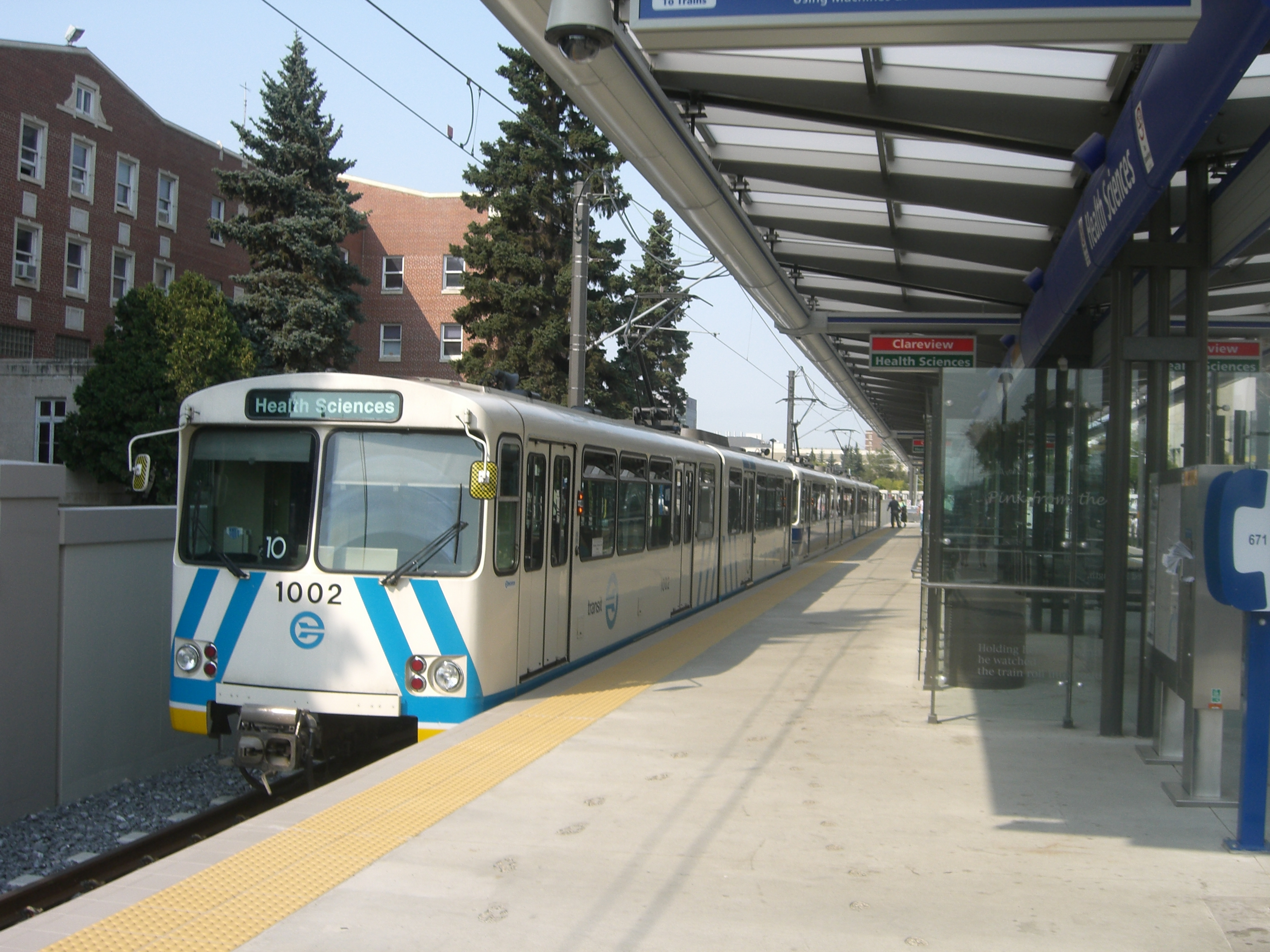
Opened in 1978, Edmonton LRT is an early example of a North American modern light rail system.

The pioneering "modern" North American light rail system, Edmonton LRT, was started in Edmonton in 1974 and became operational on April 22, 1978 – it used mostly European technology, did not use street running, and operated in tunnels in the downtown area (which accounted for much of the high expense of building that system). It was soon followed by light rail systems in San Diego and Calgary in 1981 that used similar vehicles but that avoided the expense of tunnels by using surface alignments and, on a few sections, even partial street running, in reserved lanes (restricted to transit vehicles only). The development of light rail systems in North America then proliferated widely after 1985, mostly in the United States, but also in Canada and Mexico. Including streetcars, light rail systems are operating successfully in over 30 U.S. cities, and are in planning or construction stages in several more.

==== Heritage and modern streetcars ====
New public transit streetcar services also returned, at least in the United States, around the same time as the emergence of the new light rail transit.

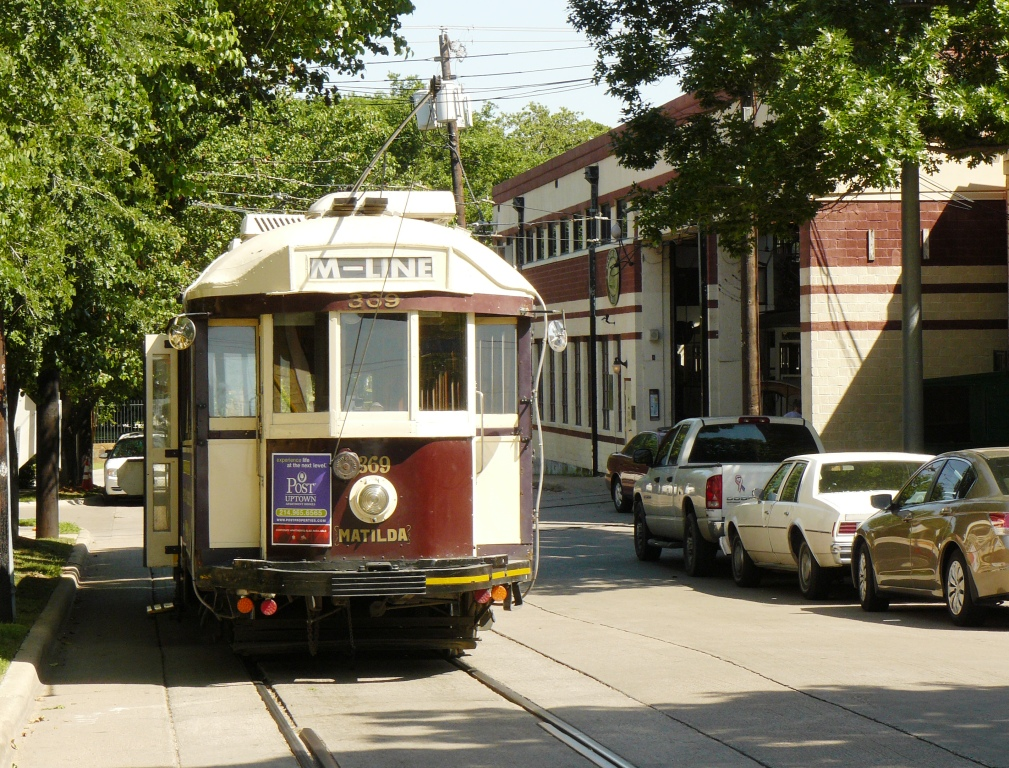
A heritage streetcar in Dallas. The majority of streetcar lines opened in the late-20th century were heritage lines, opened as a tourist service, and not as a "true" public transit line.

Prior to 2001, the new streetcar systems that opened in North America for public transit were so-called heritage streetcar systems, alternatively known as "vintage trolley" or "historic trolley" lines. While Detroit and Seattle were the first cities to open heritage lines in 1976 and 1982, their heritage lines ultimately closed in 2003 and 2005, respectively. The first heritage system to be successful was Dallas' M-Line Trolley, which opened in 1989. Memphis opened what ultimately became a larger heritage streetcar system in 1993, while San Francisco restored one of its defunct streetcar lines (F Market & Wharves) using heritage streetcar operations in 1995. These heritage systems were followed in the 2000s by new heritage streetcar lines in Kenosha, Tampa, and Little Rock, and the restoration of a defunct streetcar line using heritage streetcars in Philadelphia (SEPTA Route 15) in 2005. Other cities in both the United States and Canada opened new heritage streetcar lines that operated only on weekends or seasonally, primarily as tourist services, and so didn't provide true "public transit" service.

Truly modern streetcar systems arose in the United States, starting in 2001, in Portland, Oregon. This was followed by new streetcar lines in Seattle, Salt Lake City, Tucson, and Atlanta. These systems were completely new in every way, operating on new track built specifically for them, and operating with "modern" streetcar vehicles rather than the "heritage" vehicles used in places like Dallas, Memphis and San Francisco.

==== Transportation vs. development ====
In 2015, the Mineta Transportation Institute released a peer-reviewed research report that used key informant interviews to examine the experiences on modern-era streetcars operating in Little Rock, Memphis, Portland, Seattle, and Tampa. The research revealed that in these cities, the primary purpose of the streetcar was to serve as a development tool (in all cities examined), a second objective was to serve as a tourism-promoting amenity (in Little Rock and Tampa), and transportation objectives were largely afterthoughts with the notable exception of Portland, and to a lesser degree, Seattle.

== Surviving first-generation streetcar systems ==
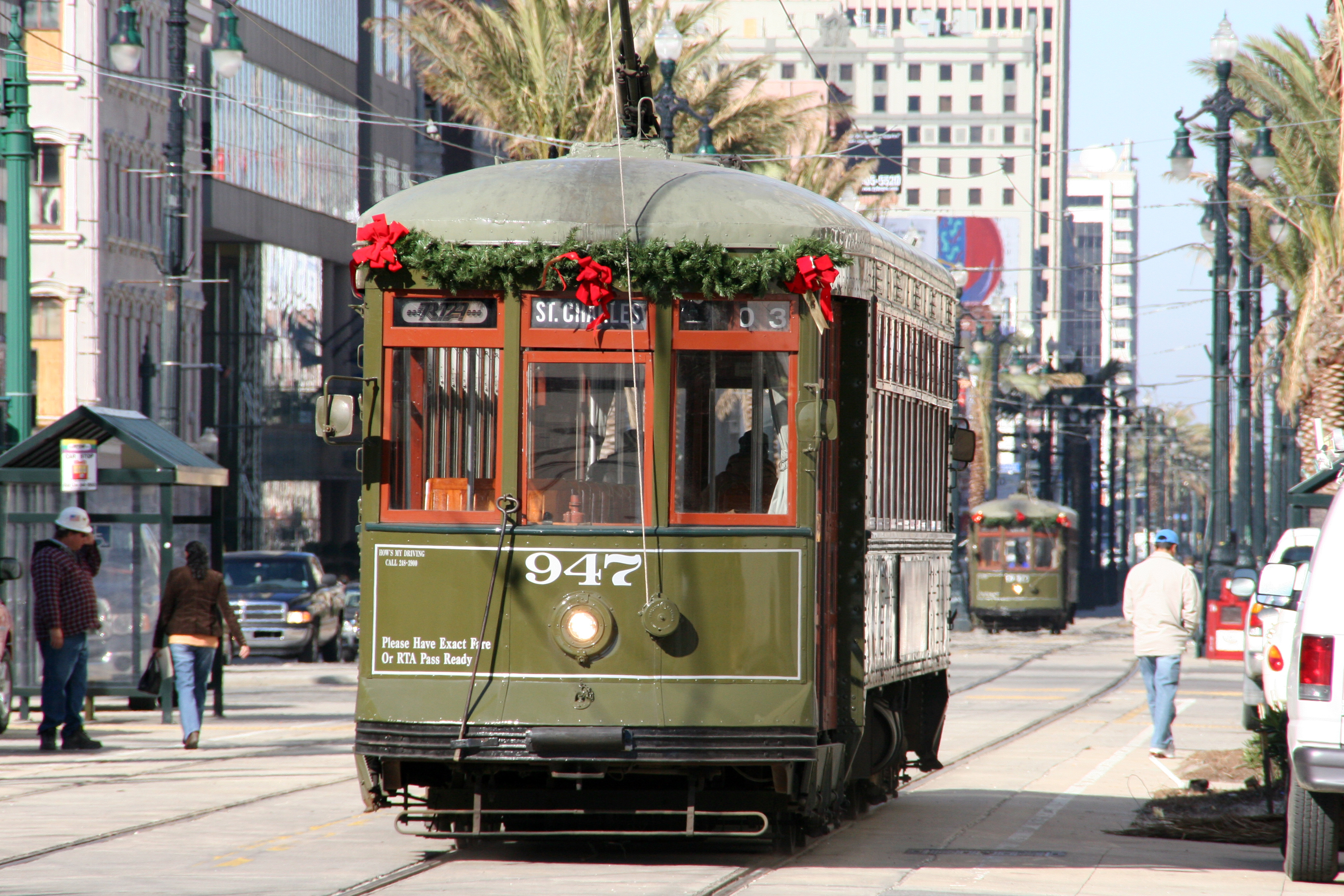
New Orleans operates the oldest operating street railway system in the world, a system that dates back to 1835.

Not all streetcar systems were removed after World War II. The San Francisco cable car system and New Orleans' streetcars are the most famous examples of the survival of a "legacy" streetcar system in the United States to the present day. In addition to New Orleans' streetcars, Toronto's conventional electric streetcar system also avoided abandonment, as did portions of the streetcar systems in San Francisco, Boston, Newark, Philadelphia, Pittsburgh, and Cleveland, as well as Mexico City. The Newark, Philadelphia, and Boston systems run into subways downtown, while the Pittsburgh and San Francisco systems have tunnels under large hills that had no acceptable road alternatives for bus replacements. The St. Charles Avenue line in New Orleans runs down the park-like "neutral ground" in the center of St. Charles Avenue, while the surviving Xochimilco line in Mexico City, the interurban lines in Cleveland, and almost all of the above-ground portions of the Boston system have similar rights-of-way, and, thus, are generally treated as "light rail" lines in modern contexts rather than as "streetcar" lines. The only electric system to survive without using these alternatives to street running was Toronto's.

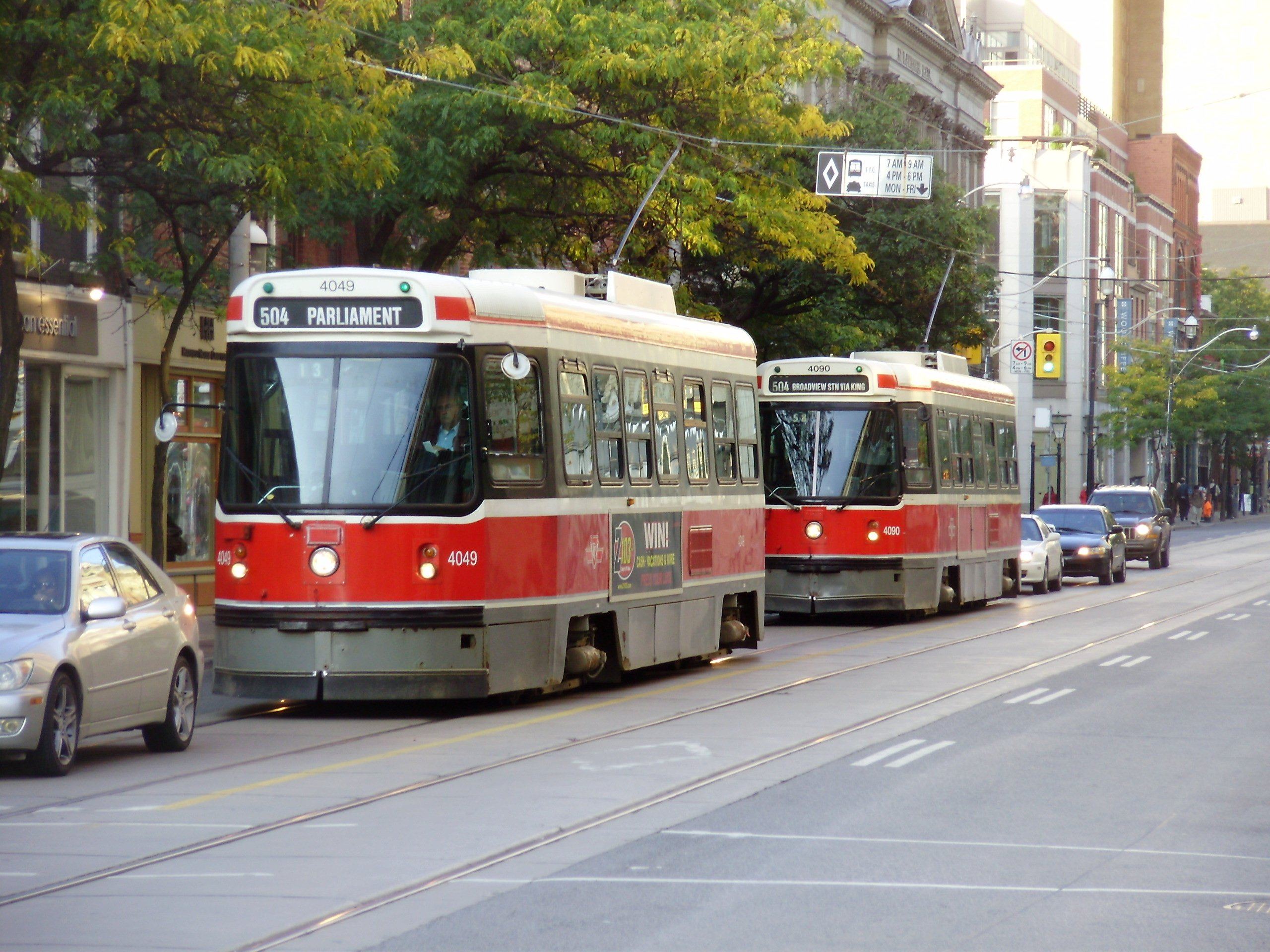
The Toronto streetcar system is the only surviving first-generation system whose streetcars still primarily use street running.

The surviving legacy systems using PCC streetcars have since replaced their PCC cars with modern light rail vehicles, although restored vintage PCC cars are still in regular operation on Boston's Mattapan Line, and as well as on San Francisco's restored F Market heritage line. New Orleans' streetcar system also continues to operate a few surviving Perley Thomas cars (along with replica cars). All of the other legacy systems have received new equipment and most have upgraded to modern light rail vehicles.

Some of these cities have also rehabilitated lines, and Newark, New Orleans, and San Francisco have added trackage and new lines in recent years; San Francisco also restored a streetcar line with heritage service in 1995 (see Heritage streetcar systems section, below). In Philadelphia, a former trolley line (SEPTA Route 15, aka. the Girard Avenue Line), that was "bustituted" in 1992, resumed trolley service in 2005 using rebuilt historic cars (see below); two other former Philadelphia trolley lines have been proposed for a resumption in trolley service in the 2010s though such plans have stalled.

In Canada, most cities once had a streetcar system, but today the Toronto Transit Commission (TTC) is the only traditional operator of streetcars, and maintains the Western Hemisphere's most extensive system in terms of track length, number of cars, and ridership. The city has added two new streetcar lines in recent years (510 Spadina in 1990, and 509 Harbourfront in 2000), and is upgrading its other lines. Its traditional fleet of CLRVs and ALRVs were replaced by the newer Bombardier Flexity low-floor models, and expansion is planned in combination with the city's plans for the rejuvenation of its waterfront.

The table below lists the surviving first-generation "legacy" streetcars in those nine North American cities:

City/area served	Country	State/province	System	Year opened	Year last expanded	System length	Stops	Lines	Type of vehicle	System description
Boston	United States	Massachusetts	Green Line (Note: This system also has a heavy rail rapid transit / metro portion (see List of metro systems), and connections to a commuter rail system; the figures and statistics presented here represent the streetcar / light rail portion of the system only.) (Note: While the MBTA Green Line is light rail, the MBTA Blue, Orange, and Red lines are rapid transit / subways and are not included here.)	1897	2022	22.6 mi (36.4 km)	66	4	Kinki Sharyo, AnsaldoBreda, and CAF USA LRVs	Light rail/Streetcar (with subway)
Boston	United States	Massachusetts	Mattapan Line	1929	n/a	2.6 mi (4.2 km)	8	1	PCC streetcars (1943–46)	Heritage light rail (Note: This system is run with historic (i.e. "heritage") rolling stock, but is considered to be a regular light rail or streetcar system rather than a "heritage streetcar" system.)
Cleveland	United States	Ohio	RTA Shaker Rapid (Note: While the Blue and Green Lines are light rail, Cleveland's other transit line, the Red Line, is rapid transit.)	1913 / 1980	1996	15.3 mi (24.6 km)	34	2	Breda LRVs	Converted to Light rail
Mexico City	Mexico	Mexico City	Mexico City Light Rail	1910 / 1986	1988	12.9 km (8.0 mi)	18	1	Concarril and Bombardier LRVs	Converted to Light rail
Newark	United States	New Jersey	Newark Light Rail	1935	2006	7.0 mi (11.3 km)	17	2	Kinki Sharyo	Converted to light rail (with subway)
New Orleans	United States	Louisiana	New Orleans Streetcars	1835	2016	22.3 mi (35.9 km)	115	5	Perley Thomas cars and replicas	Streetcar
Philadelphia	United States	Pennsylvania	D	1906		11.9 mi (19.2 km)	52	2	Kawasaki K cars	Light rail
Philadelphia	United States	Pennsylvania	T	1906	1972	19.8 mi (31.9 km)	16 (Note: SEPTA Subway–Surface Trolley Lines: 16 stations (8 underground; 8 surface), with several additional streetcar-like surface stops.)	5	Kawasaki K cars	Streetcar (with subway)
Pittsburgh	United States	Pennsylvania	Pittsburgh Light Rail	1904 / 1984	2012	26.2 mi (42.2 km)	53	2	Siemens SD-400 and CAF LRVs	Converted to light rail (with subway)
San Francisco	United States	California	Muni Metro	1917 / 1980	2022	35.7 mi (57.5 km)	120 (Note: Muni Metro: 33 stations (9 underground; 24 surface), with an additional 87 streetcar-like surface stops.)	6 (+1)	Siemens S200 LRVs	Streetcar (with subway)
San Francisco	United States	California	San Francisco cable cars (Note: It is debatable whether this system truly qualifies as "light rail" (or as a true "transit" system either), but it is included in the table anyway for completeness.)	1878	1952	5.2 mi (8.4 km)	62	3	Historic cable cars	Cable car
Toronto	Canada	Ontario	TTC streetcars (Note: The light rails Line 6 Finch West and Line 5 Eglinton are considered part of the subway system and are not included here as they are completely new development in area that never had streetcar service and does not connect to the streetcar system.)	1861	2016	82 km (51 mi)	708	11	Bombardier Flexity Outlook	Streetcar

== Second-generation streetcar systems ==
=== Systems offering regular public transit ===
Newly built systems using modern streetcars have so far only opened in cities in the United States, and are summarized in the table below (listed in order of opening):

City/area served	Country	State/province	Streetcar system	Year opened	Year last expanded	System length	Stops	Lines	Type of vehicle
Portland	United States	Oregon	Portland Streetcar	2001	2015	7.35 mi (11.83 km)	76	2	Škoda 10 T, Inekon Trams 12-Trio; United Streetcar 100; Brookville Liberty
Seattle	United States	Washington	Seattle Streetcar	2007	2016	3.8 mi (6.1 km)	17	2	Inekon Trams 12-Trio, Trio Type 121
Salt Lake City	United States	Utah	S Line	2013	n/a	2.0 mi (3.2 km)	7	1	Siemens S70
Tucson	United States	Arizona	Sun Link	2014	n/a	3.9 mi (6.3 km)	22	1	United Streetcar 200
Atlanta	United States	Georgia	Atlanta Streetcar	2014	n/a	2.7 mi (4.3 km)	12	1	Siemens S70
Dallas	United States	Texas	Dallas Streetcar	2015	2016	2.45 mi (3.94 km)	6	1	Brookville Liberty
Charlotte	United States	North Carolina	CityLynx	2015	2021	4.0 mi (6.4 km)	17	1	Siemens S700
Kansas City	United States	Missouri	KC Streetcar	2016	2025	5.7 mi (9.2 km)	16	1	CAF Urbos 3
Cincinnati	United States	Ohio	Cincinnati Bell Connector	2016	n/a	3.6 mi (5.8 km)	18	1	CAF Urbos 3
Detroit	United States	Michigan	QLine	2017	n/a	3.3 mi (5.3 km)	20	1	Brookville Liberty
Milwaukee	United States	Wisconsin	The Hop	2018	2024	2.5 mi (4.0 km)	21	2	Brookville Liberty
Oklahoma City	United States	Oklahoma	Oklahoma City Streetcar	2018	n/a	4.8 mi (7.7 km)	22	2	Brookville Liberty
Tempe	United States	Arizona	S Line	2022	n/a	3.44 mi (6 km)	14	1	Brookville Liberty

=== Closed systems ===
City/area served	Country	State/province	Streetcar system	Year opened	Year closed	System length	Stops	Lines	Type of vehicle
Washington, D.C.	United States	District of Columbia	DC Streetcar	2016	2026	2.4 mi (3.9 km)	8	1	Inekon 12-Trio; United Streetcar model 100

=== United States ===
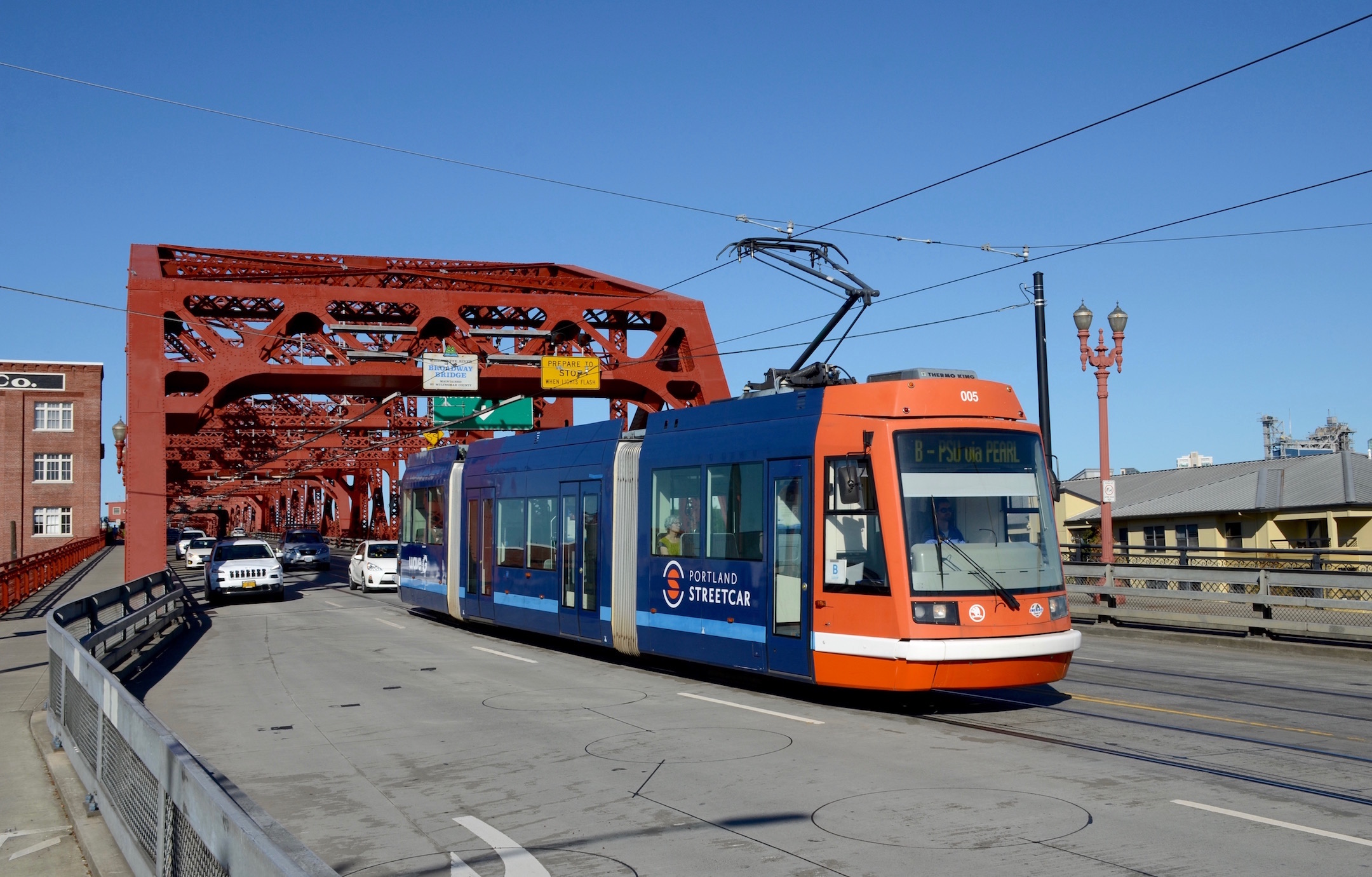
Opened in 2001, the Portland Streetcar was the first streetcar system using modern vehicles to be established in the United States in over 50 years.

In 2001, Portland, Oregon, which already had a successful light rail system (MAX), became the first city in the North America in more than 50 years to open a new streetcar system served by modern vehicles, with the opening of the Portland Streetcar. It uses low-floor cars built in the Czech Republic, but the system's first U.S.-assembled streetcar was delivered in 2009. The line serves as a downtown circulator between the central city core, the Pearl District and Northwest Portland, Portland State University, and in 2005 was extended to the South Waterfront district, a new mixed-use development along the Willamette River shoreline. Running almost entirely on streets and without any separation from other traffic on most sections, it complements the MAX light rail system, which covers much longer distances and serves as a regional, higher-capacity rail system for the metropolitan area. The MAX system also runs along streets in central Portland, but is separated from traffic (other than buses) even in those areas, via reserved light-rail-only lanes. Construction of a second streetcar line, to the city's east side, began in 2009, and the new line opened in September 2012.

The new Portland system and several of the new heritage streetcar systems have been intended, in part, as a way of influencing property development in the corridors served, in such a way as to increase density while attracting residents interested in relatively car-free living. The Portland Streetcar is considered to have been very successful in this regard.

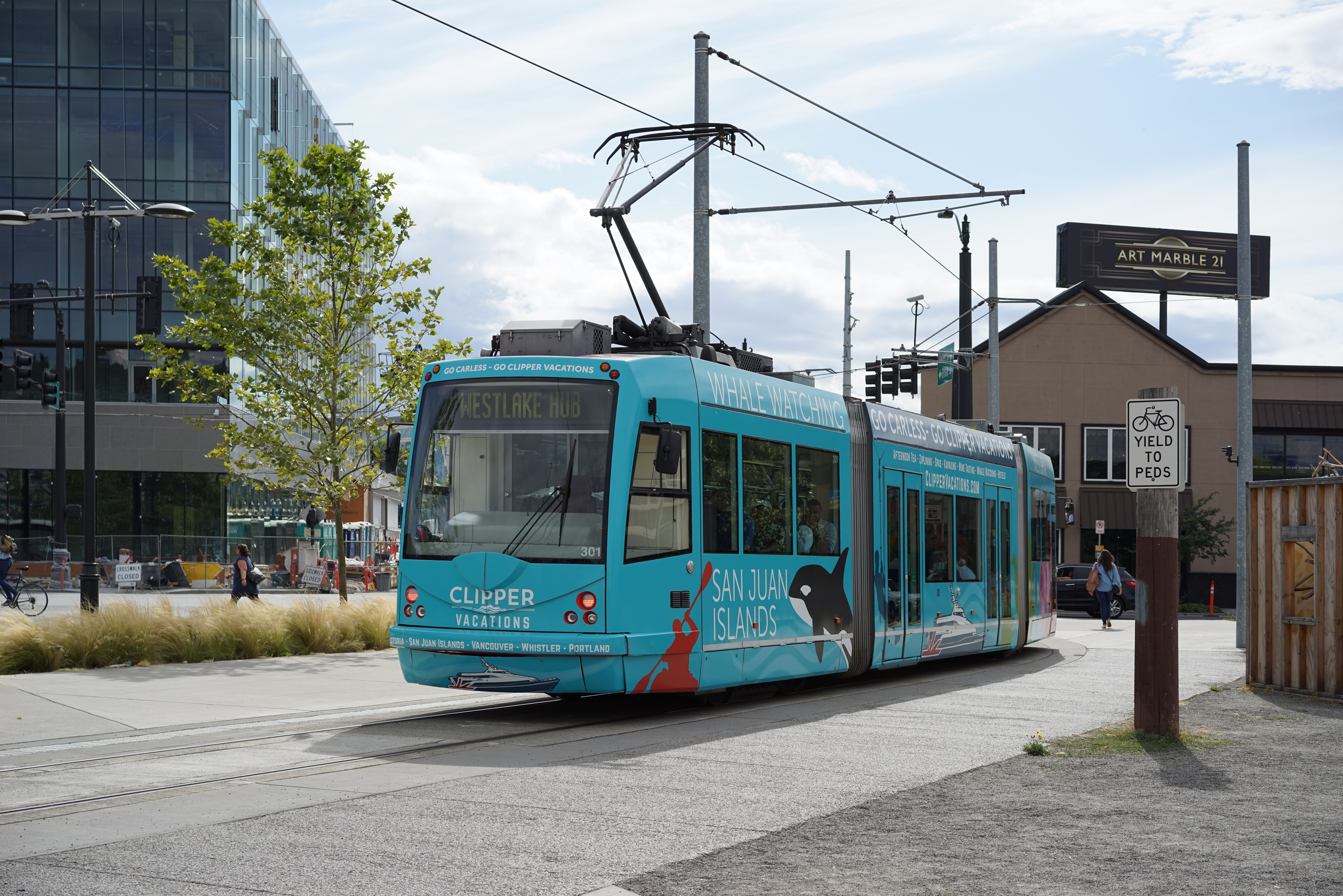
Established in 2007, the Seattle Streetcar was the second streetcar system established in the United States in the 21st century.

The second "second-generation" streetcar system opened in North America was in 2007, in Seattle, where the city's transportation department led the project to construct the South Lake Union Streetcar, but contracted with local transit authority King County Metro to operate the service. Connecting the neighborhood south of Lake Union with the transit core of downtown Seattle, it operates every 15 minutes and is served by three low-floor streetcars of the same type as some of those in Portland. Residents of the area began referring to the system as the "South Lake Union Trolley" giving it the amusing but unfortunate acronym of "SLUT". A line serving First Hill opened in January 2016 and feeds Central Link, the light rail system that opened in 2009. Construction of an extension that will connect the two lines is set to begin in early 2018.

A new rail line that opened in Tacoma, Washington in 2003, Tacoma Link, is sometimes referred to as a streetcar line because of its short length and use of single vehicles (rather than trains) of the same type as the low-floor streetcars used in Portland. Because the line is separated from other traffic over most of its length, it is a light rail line, as its operator (Sound Transit) considers it to be.

==== In development ====
Some 70 U.S. cities have studied the idea of bringing back streetcars as transit, although to date the number that have come to fruition has been small. In the 2000s, one factor in this was lack of funding support for streetcar development from the Federal Transit Administration (FTA) under the Bush administration. Nonetheless, under the Obama administration, the FTA indicated it would provide funding for streetcar projects in cities interested in building new systems.

==== Under construction ====
The following table lists the new modern streetcar systems that are currently under construction:

City/area served	State	System	Planned opening	System length	Type of vehicle
Orange County	California	OC Streetcar	2026	4.1 mi (7 km)	Siemens S700 (Note: These were model S70 when the order was placed in 2018 but, in 2020, were retroactively rebranded as model S700 by Siemens.)
Omaha	Nebraska	Omaha Streetcar	2026–2027	3.0 mi (5 km)	CAF Urbos 3

The systems listed above will use modern streetcars. For new heritage streetcar systems that are under construction, see relevant section below.

==== Planned or proposed ====
In addition to the streetcar systems currently under construction, a number of additional streetcar systems are in the planning stages in the United States.

Examples of cities with streetcar systems in the active planning stages include Calgary, Los Angeles, Sacramento, and Saint Paul.

== Heritage streetcar systems ==
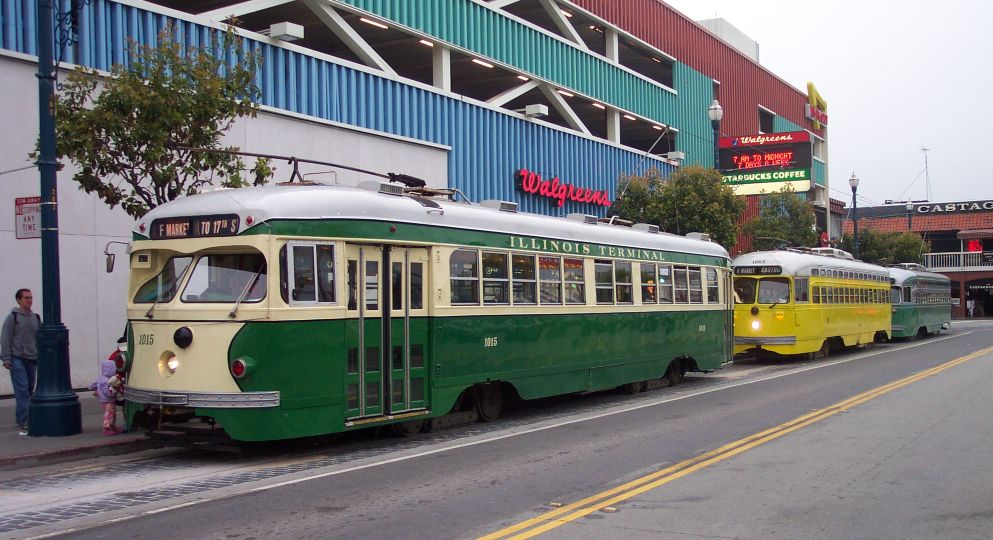
Three PCCs on the San Francisco Municipal Railway's F-line in 2003. Pictured are an example of one double-ended streetcar and two single-ended cars.

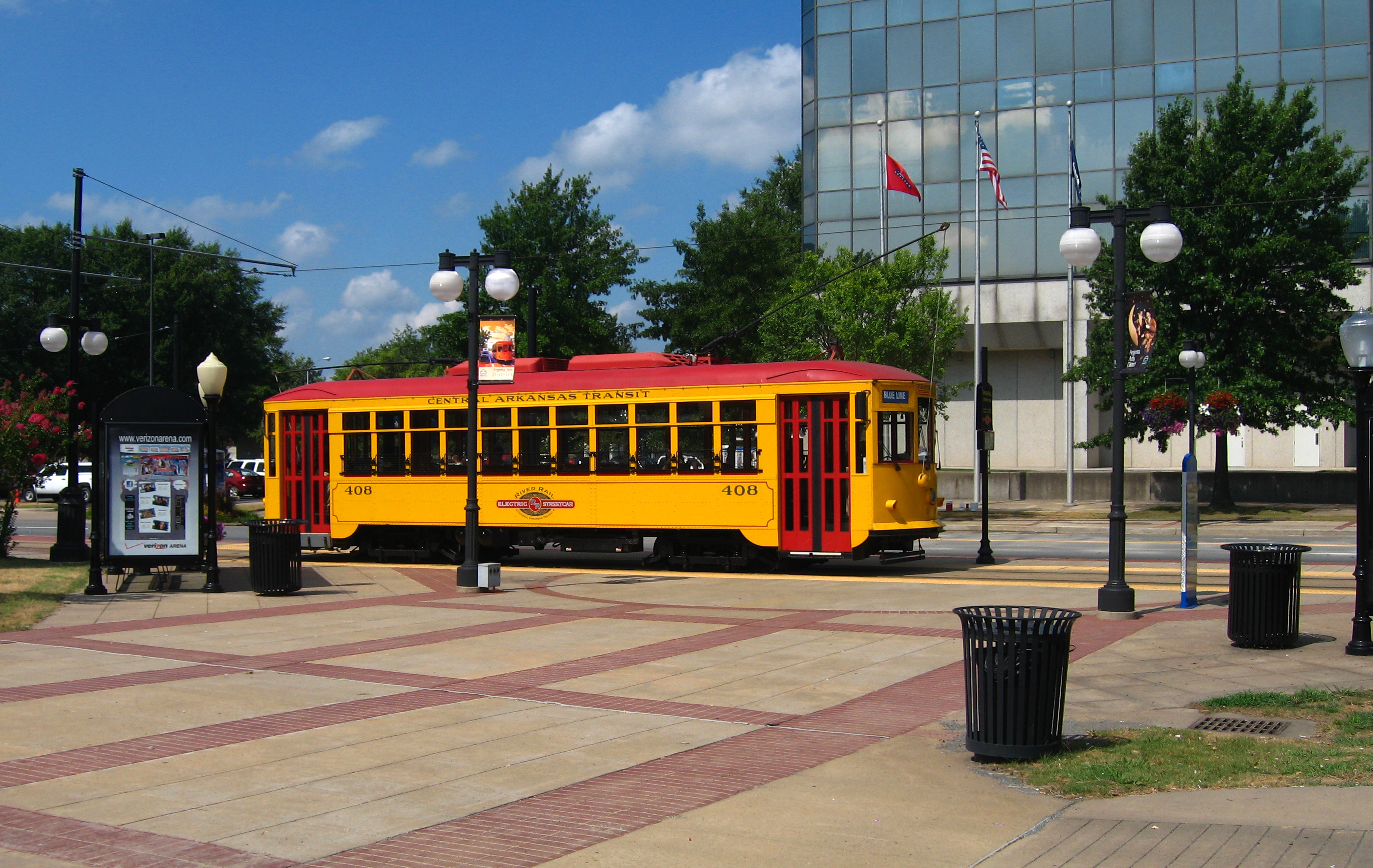
Metro Streetcar of Little Rock is one of several heritage streetcar lines established in the early 21st century.

Heritage streetcar systems are sometimes used in public transit service, combining light rail efficiency with tourists' nostalgia interests. Proponents claim that using a simple, reliable form of transit from 50 or 100 years ago can bring history to life for 21st century visitors.

Prior to 2001, the new streetcar systems that opened in North America had been heritage lines, alternatively known as vintage trolley or 'historic' trolley lines. Several cities built new heritage streetcar lines, starting from the 1980s onward. Some heritage systems operate only with limited hours, and/or only on weekends, or seasonally, and thus are simply tourist- or history-oriented excursion services. Other heritage systems operate daily, running throughout the entire day, year-round, thus providing true public transit service.

New heritage streetcar systems providing daily, year-round service included ones opened in Seattle (the Waterfront Streetcar – opened in 1982, but closed in 2005), Galveston (1988; service suspended in 2008 after Hurricane Ike, but reopened in 2021), Dallas (M-Line Trolley) (1989), Memphis (1993) and Kenosha, Wisconsin (2000). Other new heritage streetcar lines have opened in Tampa in 2002 and Little Rock in 2004. All of these were newly constructed systems, but all have been served by historic streetcars or replicas of historic streetcars. The El Paso Streetcar is a new heritage system that opened in November 2018, using six restored PCC streetcars that have survived from the city's previous streetcar system, which closed in 1974, but serving a new route.

=== Systems offering regular public transit ===
The following two tables list all of the currently operating heritage streetcar systems offering regular public transit service:

New heritage streetcar systems:
City/area served	Country	State/province	Heritage streetcar system	Year opened	Year last expanded	System length	Stops	Lines	Type of vehicle
Dallas	United States	Texas	M-Line Trolley	1989	2015	4.6 mi (7.4 km)	40	1	Various
El Paso	United States	Texas	El Paso Streetcar	2018	n/a	4.8 mi (7.7 km)	27	2	Restored PCC streetcars
Little Rock	United States	Arkansas	Metro Streetcar (formerly River Rail Streetcar)	2004	2007	3.4 mi (5.5 km)	15	2	Birney-type streetcars
Memphis	United States	Tennessee	MATA Trolley	1993	2004	6.3 mi (10.1 km)	13	1	Various, plus replicas from Gomaco Trolley Company
Tampa	United States	Florida	TECO Line Streetcar	2002	2010	2.7 mi (4.3 km)	11	1	Birney-type streetcars

Heritage service restored to formerly defunct streetcar lines:
City/area served	Country	State/province	Heritage streetcar system	Year opened	Year last expanded	System length	Stops	Lines	Type of vehicle
Philadelphia	United States	Pennsylvania	SEPTA Route G (formerly route 15)	2005	2012	8.4 mi (13.5 km)	48	1	SEPTA PCC III
San Francisco	United States	California	F Market & Wharves	1995	2000	6.2 mi (10.0 km)	32	1	PCC streetcars and ex-Milan Peter Witt streetcars
San Francisco	United States	California	E Embarcadero	2015	n/a		18	1	Double-ended PCC streetcars

=== Closed systems ===
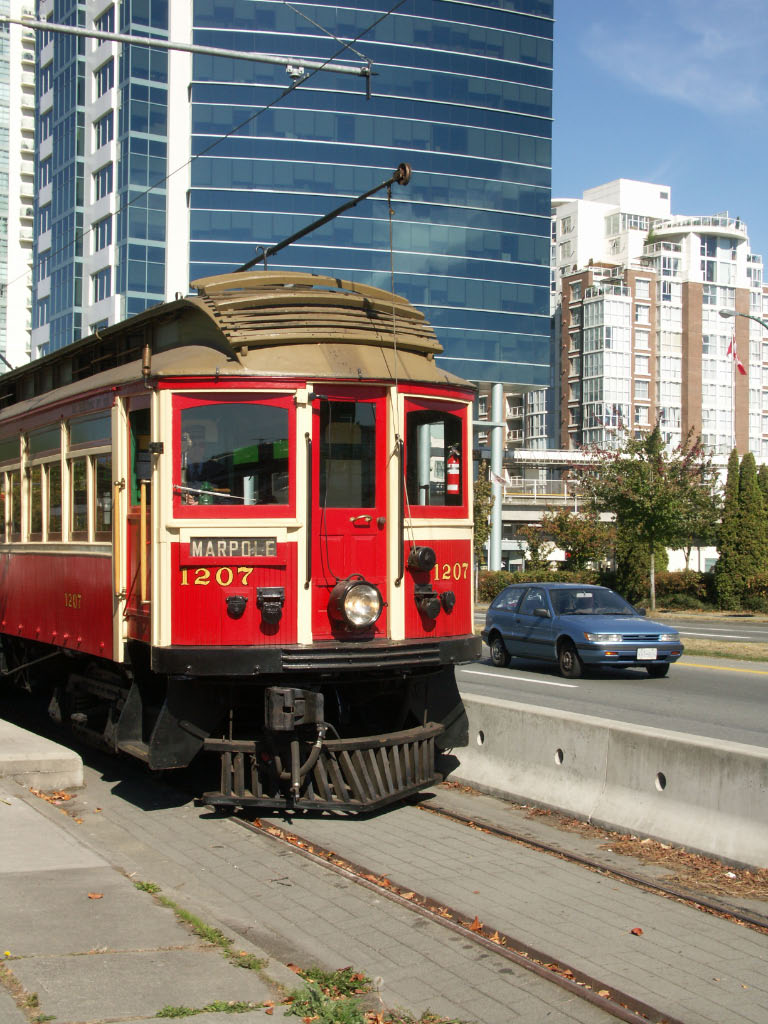
A historic tram from 1905 that operated again in Vancouver, British Columbia between 1998 and 2012.

- The heritage Detroit Downtown Trolley in Detroit, Michigan, operated from 1976 until 2003. The Detroit trolley faced a steep decline in ridership after the Detroit People Mover system was installed in 1987. The carbarn for the former narrow gauge trolley was demolished in 2004, and the tracks have subsequently been removed.
- The Waterfront Streetcar in Seattle, Washington, was a heritage line that operated from 1982 until 2005, when the line's carbarn was demolished to make room for the Olympic Sculpture Park.
- Vancouver, British Columbia had the Vancouver Downtown Historic Railway, which was a tourist-based heritage system that opened in 1998 and which used to operate on weekends and holidays from May to mid-October; the system closed in 2012, with their rolling stock transferred to the Fraser Valley Heritage Railway Society.
- The Waterfront Red Car in the San Pedro section of Los Angeles, California, was a heritage line that operated from 2003 until closure in 2015 due to the realignment of Sampson Way leading into Ports O' Call Village. Restoring trackage was deemed cost prohibitive.
- Operations on the tourist-oriented heritage River Street Streetcar in Savannah, Georgia have been suspended since 2016, officially on a temporary basis and due to interfering construction works. It is unclear when, if ever, the service will resume.
- From 2015 to July 2019, the CityLynx Gold Line in Charlotte operated with replica heritage streetcars sourced from the former Charlotte Trolley. Service with these vehicles was suspended in July 2019 to accommodate Phase 2 construction and station modifications for level boarding. When the line reopened on August 30, 2021, it began operating with modern Siemens S700 streetcars, and the heritage fleet was permanently retired from service and subsequently sold to Memphis, Tennessee for potential reuse.
- Other tourist-oriented heritage trolley systems that have closed are the Charlotte Trolley (1996–2010), the Portland Vintage Trolley (1991–2014) and the Old Pueblo Trolley (1993–2011) in Tucson, Arizona.

=== List of primarily tourist heritage systems in North America ===
The following table lists primarily tourist-oriented heritage streetcar systems (i.e. systems not designed primarily for public transit – and thus heritage systems that often operate only seasonally):

City/area served	Country	State/province	Heritage streetcar system	Year opened	System length	Remarks
Astoria	United States	Oregon	Astoria Riverfront Trolley	1999	3 mi (4.8 km)	Seasonal: Operates Thursday-Tuesday, from April to October, weather permitting. Hours are either 1–4 p.m. or 11 a.m. to 5 p.m.
Calgary	Canada	Alberta	Calgary Municipal Railway Streetcar	1973	0.9 km (0.56 mi)	
Denver	United States	Colorado	Platte Valley Trolley	1989	1.2 mi (1.9 km)	Seasonal: Operates noon to 3:30 p.m. Friday–Sunday only, from May to October.
Edmonton	Canada	Alberta	Fort Edmonton Park Streetcar	1981	1 km (0.62 mi)	Seasonal: Operates usually 11:00 a.m. to 3:40 p.m. daily, from Victoria Day in May to Labour Day in September, and on Friday–Sunday from Labour Day to Canadian Thanksgiving in October.
Edmonton	Canada	Alberta	High Level Bridge Streetcar	1979	3.1 km (1.9 mi)	Seasonal: Operates usually 11:00 a.m. (9:00 a.m. on Saturdays) to 4:00 p.m. Thursday-Monday, from Victoria Day in May to Labour Day in September, and on Friday–Sunday from Labour Day to Canadian Thanksgiving in October.
El Reno	United States	Oklahoma	Heritage Express Trolley	2001	0.9 mi (1.4 km)	Operates 10:00 a.m. to 5:00 pm, Wednesday–Saturday, and 1:00 p.m. to 5:00 p.m, Sunday. Propane gas-powered, not electric.
Fort Collins	United States	Colorado	Fort Collins Municipal Railway	1984	1.5 mi (2.4 km)	Seasonal: Operates noon to 5 p.m. weekends only, from May to September.
Fort Smith	United States	Arkansas	Fort Smith Trolley	1991	0.75 mi (1 km)	Operates daily May through October (10:00 a.m. to 5:00 pm, Monday–Saturday, and 1:00 p.m. to 5:00 p.m, Sunday) and on weekends November through April.
Galveston	United States	Texas	Galveston Island Trolley	1988	0.75 mi (1 km)	Operates year-around, three days a week (10:00 a.m. to 6:00 p.m., Friday–Sunday). All operation was suspended from September 2008 to October 2021 because of extensive damage caused by Hurricane Ike.
Kenosha	United States	Wisconsin	Kenosha Streetcar service	2000	2.0 mi (3.2 km)	Seasonal: Operates 10:05 a.m. to 5:35 p.m. Saturday-Sunday all year, 10:05 a.m. to 2:05 p.m. Monday-Friday in March, 11:05 a.m. to 6:35 p.m. Monday-Friday from April to December, and closed Monday-Friday from January to February.
Lowell	United States	Massachusetts	Lowell National Historical Park streetcar	1984	1.2 mi (1.9 km)	Seasonal: Operates daily, between March and November.
Minneapolis	United States	Minnesota	Como-Harriet Streetcar Line	1971	1 mi (1.6 km)	Seasonal: Operates daily, from May to September, and on weekends through November.
Nelson	Canada	British Columbia	Nelson Electric Tramway	1992	1.21 km (0.75 mi)	Seasonal: Operates 11:10 a.m. to 4:40 p.m. daily, between Easter weekend and Canadian Thanksgiving in October.
Portland	United States	Oregon	Willamette Shore Trolley	1990	6 mi (9.7 km)	Seasonal: Operates 1 p.m. to 4 p.m. weekends only, from May to October, plus certain dates in December.
St. Louis	United States	Missouri	Loop Trolley	2018 (suspended 2019–2022)	2.2 mi (3.5 km)	Operates 11 a.m. to 7 p.m. Thursdays through Sundays, from about April to October only.
San Diego	United States	California	San Diego Trolley Silver Line	2011	2.7 mi (4.3 km)	Operates 9:52 a.m. to 1:52 pm. Tuesdays and Thursdays, and 10:52 a.m. to 3:22 p.m. weekends, only.
Surrey	Canada	British Columbia	Fraser Valley Heritage Railway	2013	7.4 km (4.6 mi)	Operates 10:00 a.m. to 3:00 pm, weekends only.

== Museums ==
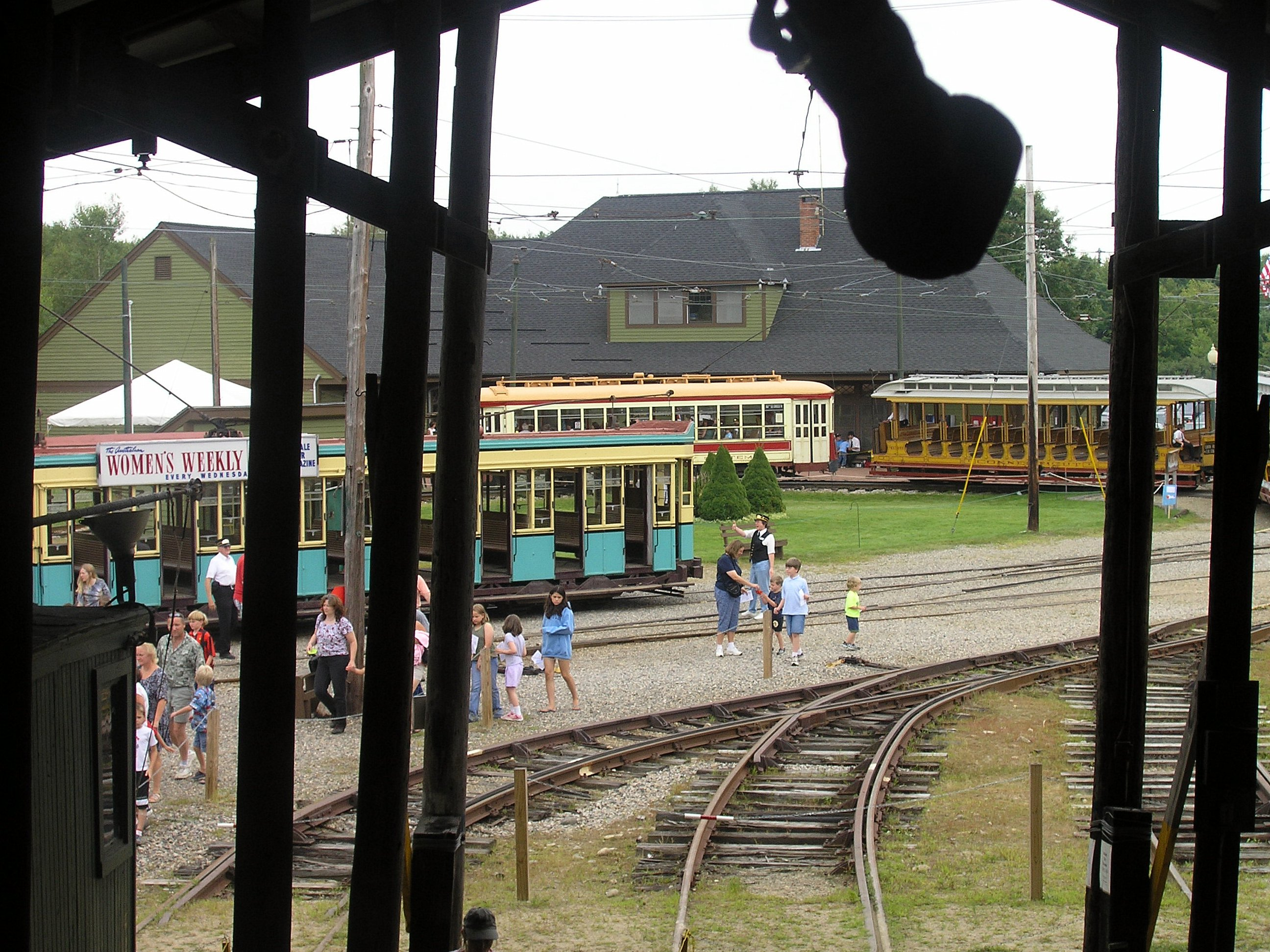
The Seashore Trolley Museum is the world's oldest and largest museum of mass transit vehicles, including streetcars.

Unlike a heritage system, a streetcar museum may offer little or no transport service. If there are working streetcars in a museum's collection, any service provided may be seasonal, not follow a schedule, offer limited stops, service only remote areas, or otherwise differ from a regularly scheduled heritage line. Some North American streetcar museums include:

- Arizona Street Railway Museum in Phoenix, Arizona
- Baltimore Streetcar Museum in Baltimore, Maryland
- Canadian Railway Museum between Delson and Saint-Constant, Quebec
- Chattanooga Choo Choo complex in Chattanooga, Tennessee
- Connecticut Trolley Museum in East Windsor, Connecticut
- East Troy Electric Railroad Museum in East Troy, Wisconsin
- Edmonton Radial Railway Society Museum in Edmonton, Alberta
- Electric City Trolley Museum in Scranton, Pennsylvania
- Fort Edmonton Park in Edmonton, Alberta
- Fox River Trolley Museum in South Elgin, Illinois
- Halton County Radial Railway in Rockwood, Ontario
- Heritage Park Historical Village in Calgary, Alberta
- Hesston Steam Museum in Heston, Indiana
- Historic Pensacola's Museum of Commerce in Pensacola, Florida
- History Park at Kelley Park in San Jose, California
- Illinois Railway Museum in Union, Illinois – collection now includes general railroad equipment as well as streetcars
- Issaquah Valley Trolley in Issaquah, Washington
- Lowell National Historical Park in Lowell, Massachusetts
- Midwest Electric Railway in Mt. Pleasant, Iowa
- Minnesota Streetcar Museum in Minneapolis, Minnesota operates heritage lines such as the Como-Harriet Streetcar Line
- Museo de Transportes Eléctricos del D.F., of STE, in Mexico City
- National Museum of Transportation in St. Louis, Missouri
- National Capital Trolley Museum in Colesville, Maryland
- New York Museum of Transportation in Rush, New York
- Northern Ohio Railway Museum in Chippewa Lake, Ohio
- North Texas Historic Transportation in Fort Worth, Texas
- Old Pueblo Trolley in Tucson, Arizona
- Orange Empire Railway Museum in Perris, California – collection now includes general railroad equipment as well as streetcars
- Oregon Electric Railway Museum in Brooks, Oregon
- Pennsylvania Trolley Museum in Washington, Pennsylvania
- Rockhill Trolley Museum in Rockhill Furnace, Pennsylvania
- Roundhouse Railroad Museum in Savannah, Georgia
- San Francisco Cable Car Museum in San Francisco, California
- San Francisco Railway Museum in San Francisco, California
- Seashore Trolley Museum in Kennebunkport, Maine
- Shelburne Falls Trolley Museum in Shelburne Falls, Massachusetts
- Shore Line Trolley Museum in East Haven, Connecticut
- Steveston Tram Museum in Steveston, BC
- Trolley Museum of New York in Kingston, New York
- Western Railway Museum in Suisun City, California
- Yakima Electric Railway Museum in Yakima, Washington
- King Jack Park in Webb City, Missouri

== See also ==
=== General articles ===
- Interurban
- Light rail in North America
- Streetcar suburb
- Streetcar Railway Post Office

=== System lists ===
- List of street railways in Canada
- List of town tramway systems in Central America (all-time)
- List of town tramway systems in North America (all-time)
- List of streetcar systems in the United States (all-time)
- List of North American light rail systems by ridership
- List of United States light rail systems by ridership

- List of rail transit systems in the United States (current systems only; list is not limited to streetcar/tram systems)
- List of tram and light rail transit systems (world list of current systems)

=== Specific systems ===
==== Operating ====
- Blue and Green Lines (Cleveland) is composed in part of streetcar lines upgraded to light-rail
- Streetcars in Boston
- Cincinnati Bell Connector
- Streetcars in Kenosha, Wisconsin
- Streetcars in Mexico City
- Streetcars in New Orleans
- Philadelphia: SEPTA Subway-Surface Trolley Lines, SEPTA Route 15, Media–Sharon Hill Line
- Portland Streetcar
- San Francisco Municipal Railway
- Seattle Streetcar
- Toronto streetcar system

==== Not operating ====
- Albuquerque Traction Company
- Streetcars in Atlanta
- Streetcars in Cincinnati
- Streetcars in Cleveland
- El Paso Electric Railway Company
- Johnstown Traction Company
- Key System
- Lackawanna and Wyoming Valley Railroad
- Los Angeles Railway
- Los Angeles Pacific Railroad
- Lehigh Valley Transit
- Streetcars in Montreal
- Ottawa Electric Railway
- Pacific Electric Railway
- Quebec City tramway (1865–1948)
- San Diego Electric Railway
- Toledo, Port Clinton and Lakeside Railway
- Twin City Rapid Transit
- Streetcars in Washington, D.C.
- Waterfront Streetcar in Seattle

=== Structures ===
==== Standing ====
- Bay E, West Ankeny Car Barns (Portland, Oregon)
- Beardsley Zoo
- Callowhill Depot
- College Park Trolley Trail
- Comfort Station (Milton, Massachusetts)
- East New York Yard bus depot is a former trolley depot
- East Side Trolley Tunnel
- Georgetown Steam Plant
- Guelph Transit stone carbarn at 371 Waterloo Avenue
- Hagerstown and Frederick Railway § Surviving landmarks
- Harvard (MBTA station)
- Inman Park
- Little York Pavilion
- Myrtle Avenue Streetcar 'subway' Jacksonville, FL. took the JTCO cars under the terminal Company tracks.
- Newton Street Railway Carbarn
- Pacific Electric Building
- Pacific Electric Railroad Bridge
- Pacific Electric Railway Company Substation No. 8
- Pacific Electric Sub-Station No. 14
- Park Avenue Tunnel (roadway) 1834 cut was used by NY&H streetcars
- Portland Railway, Light and Power Sellwood Division Carbarn Office and Clubhouse
- Streetcar Depot, West Los Angeles
- South Decatur Trolley Trail
- Terminal Arcade
- Trolley Square
- Union Street Railway Carbarn, Repair Shop
- Watts Station
- West Philadelphia Streetcar Suburb Historic District
- Wychwood Barns

==== Not standing ====
- Culver Depot formerly stood on Coney Island
- Duquesne Gardens
- Newark Public Service Terminal
- Silk Centre
- Temescal, Oakland, California#History
