= Portland Railway, Light and Power Company =

Defunct transport and utility company of Portland, Oregon

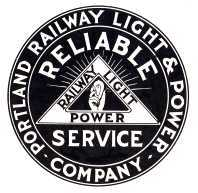
- Company type: Public
- Industry: Public utility
- Founded: 1906
- Fate: Acquired by Portland Electric Power Company (1924)
- Headquarters: Portland, Oregon, U.S.
- Key people: Franklin Griffith
- Products: Electric power, transportation

The Portland Railway, Light and Power Company (PRL&P) was a railway company and electric power utility in Portland, Oregon, United States, from 1906 until 1924.

== History ==
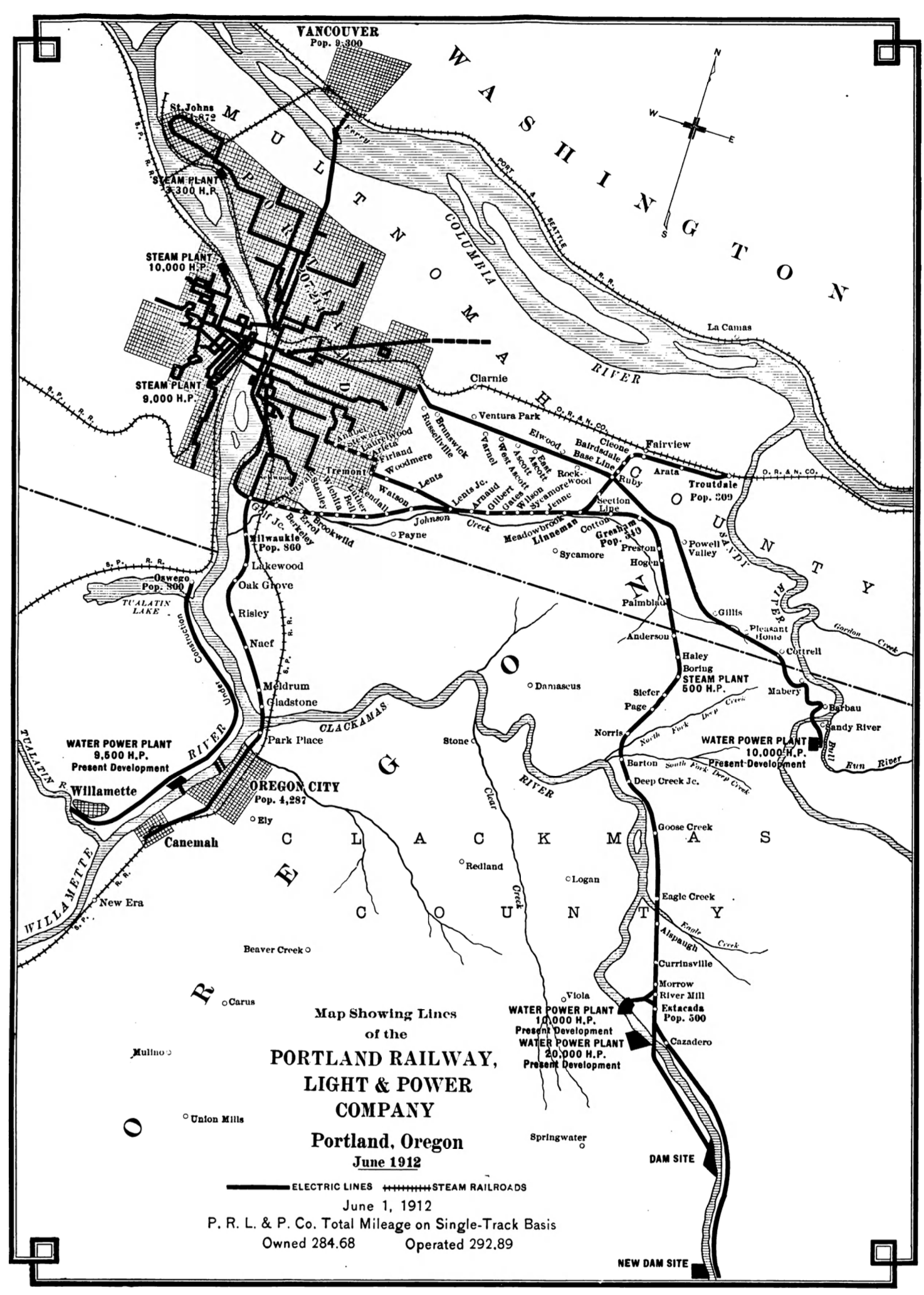
Map Showing Lines of the Portland Railway Light and Power Company Portland Oregon June 1912

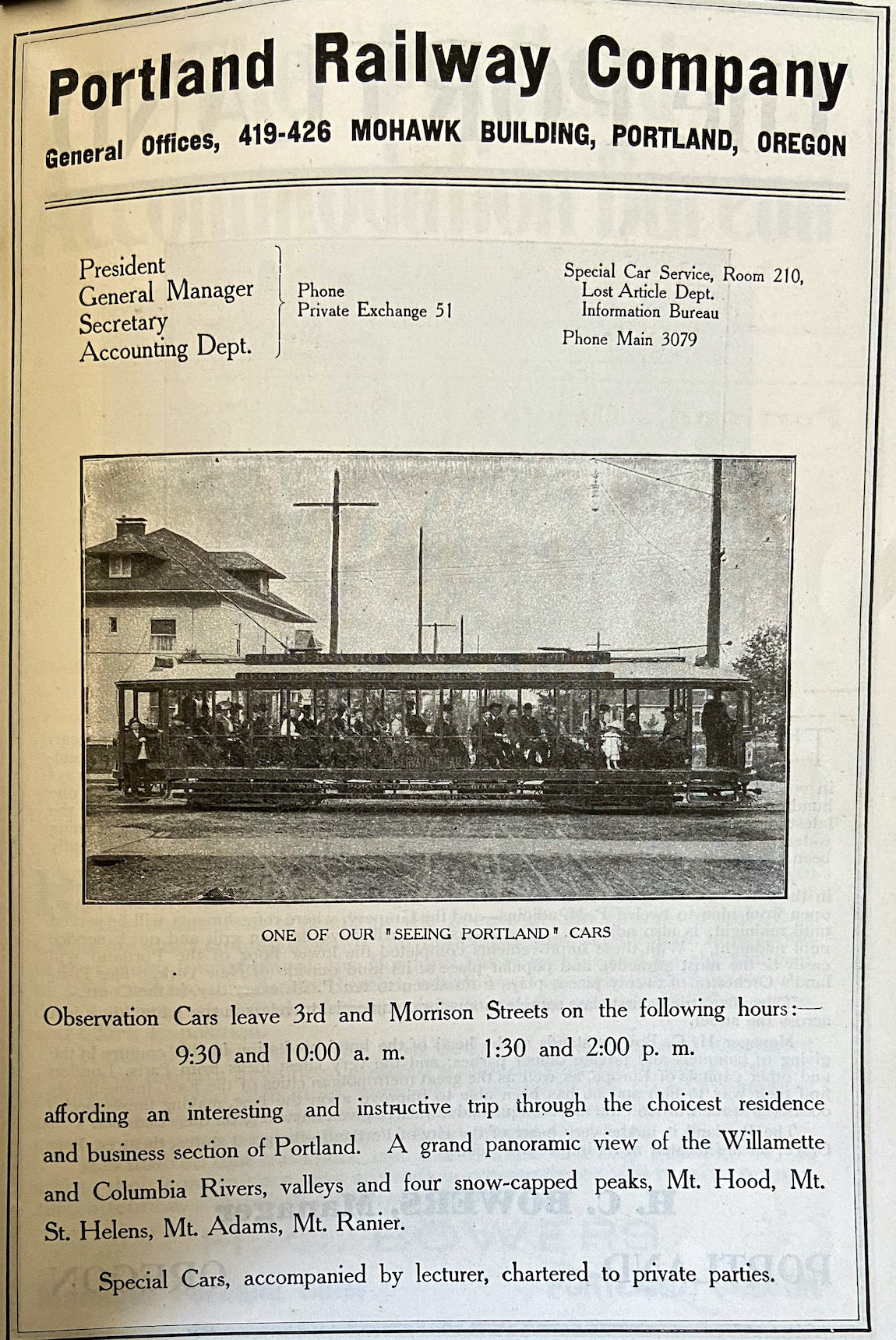
Advertisement for an excursion car in 1906

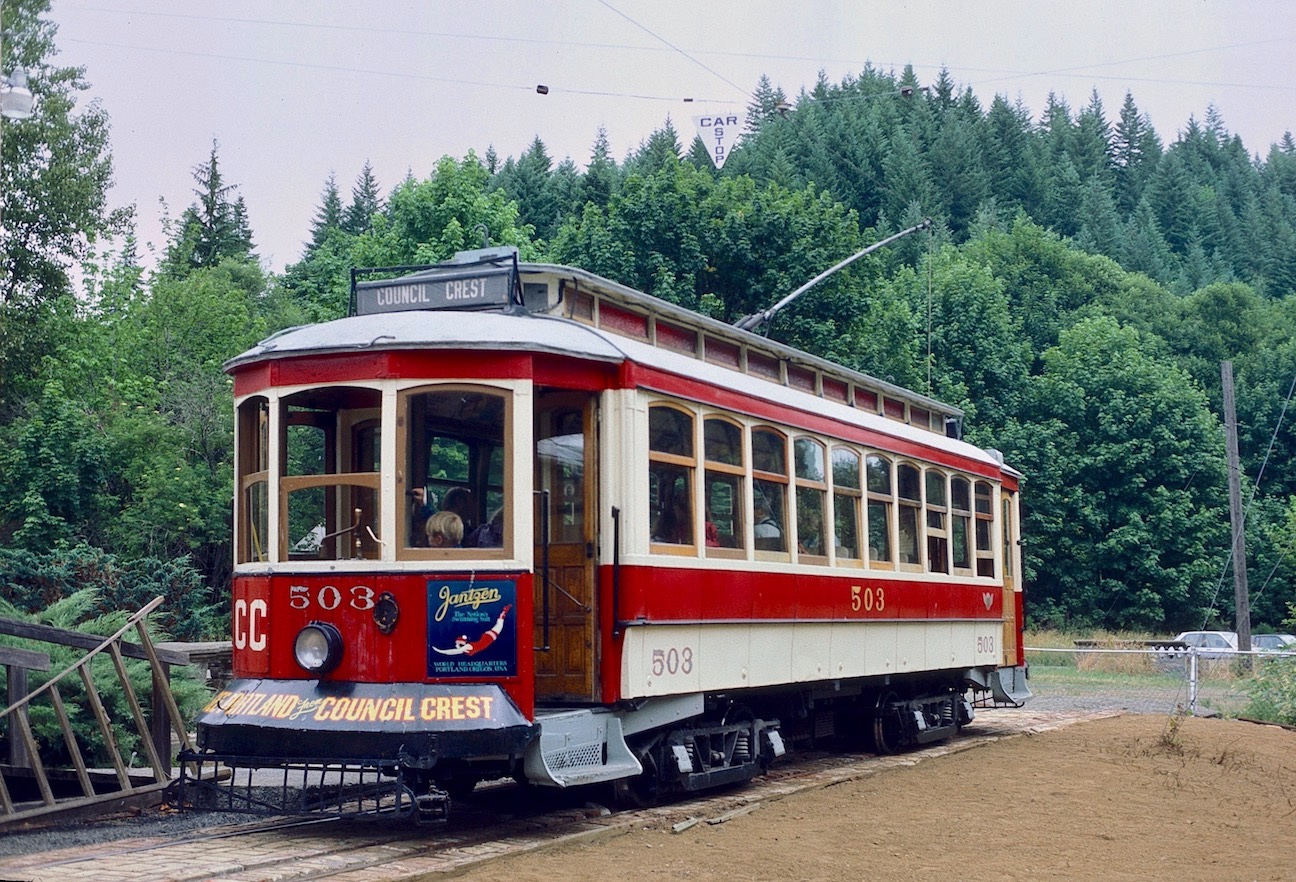
An ex-PRL&P streetcar that has been preserved is Portland "Council Crest" car 503, which was built in 1904 (as No. 203) for the Portland Street Railway Company and passed to PRL&P with a 1906 merger. It is shown at the Oregon Electric Railway Museum (old site).

A series of mergers of various transportation companies in 1905–1906 culminating in the merger of the Portland Street Railway Company; Oregon Water, Power and Railway Company; and the Portland General Electric Company on June 28, 1906, established the Portland Railway, Light and Power Company (PRL&P). Nearly 200 miles of track and 375 urban and interurban streetcars were thereupon consolidated under a single company. Upon its formation, PRL&P became the only company to operate streetcars within Portland city limits; it also continued to sell electric power. The name, Portland General Electric (PGE), remained in use as a division of PRL&P and, after subsequent reorganizations in 1930 and 1940 eventually PGE became once again fully independent as a power utility company, making PGE in some ways both an ancestor and a descendant of PRL&P.

The company's interurban lines used standard-gauge track, with the exception of the line to Vancouver, Washington, while most of its urban (or "city") lines were narrow-gauge, specifically 3 ft 6 in (1067 mm) gauge. A few lines in the southeast part of the city were standard-gauge, converted from narrow gauge in December 1908 for efficiency, so that they could operate out of PRL&P's Sellwood carbarn, which was closer to the area those lines served but was only equipped for standard-gauge operation.

By 1910, PRL&P was a $15 million holding company, having received 43 franchises from the city of Portland, mostly in the form of land grants. It was a monopoly, and "liable to anti-trust action under the Sherman Act." The company only installed safety devices (such as pedestrian bumpers) on its streetcars after "extreme public pressure." While PRL&P installed many public streetlights, the city council complained about the power rates charged to the city.

PRL&P's president, Franklin Griffith, was part of the corruption and graft surrounding Mayor George Luis Baker; Griffith and others paid off Baker's mortgage.

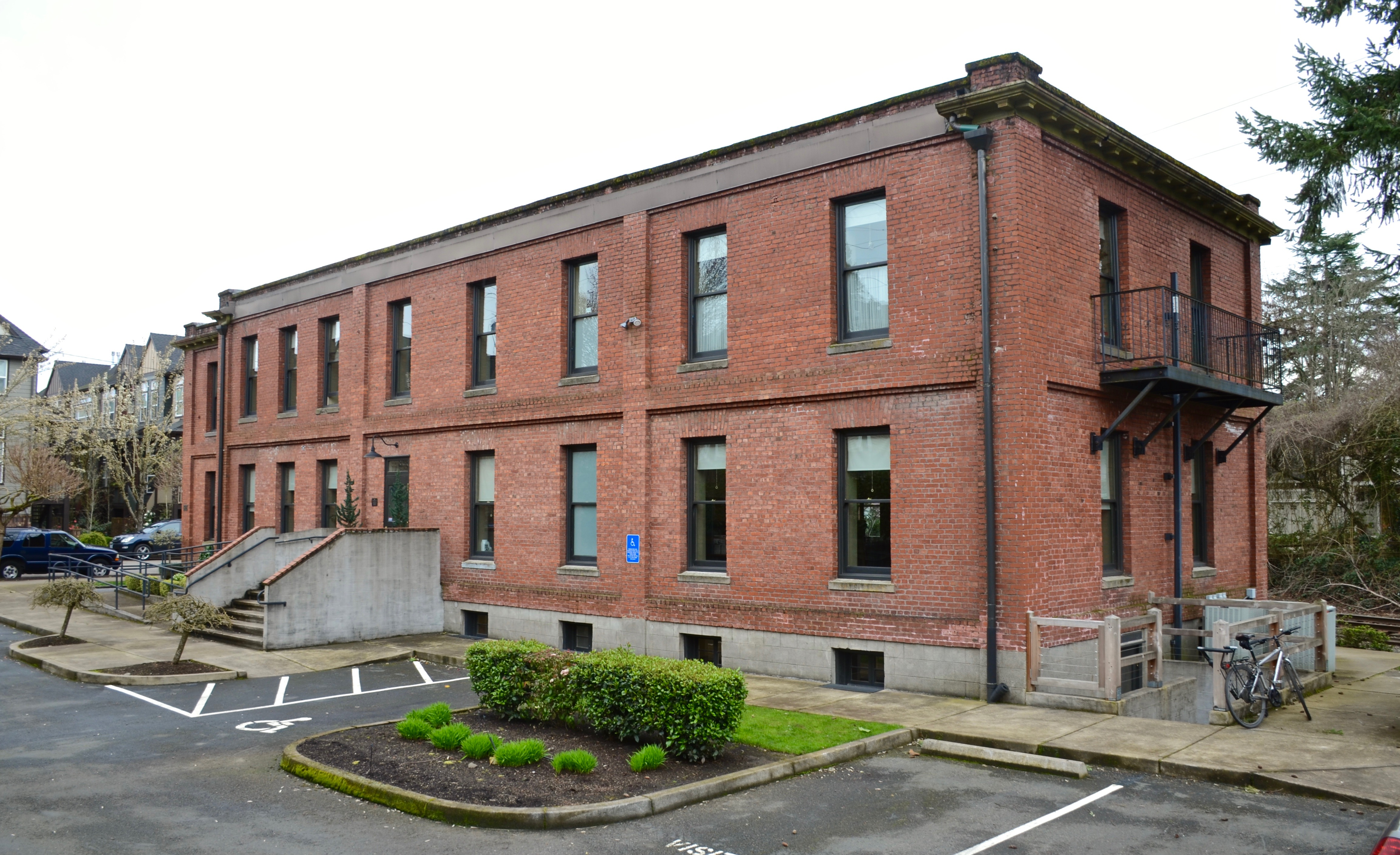
The former Sellwood Division Carbarn Office and Clubhouse of PRL&P has survived and is listed on the National Register of Historic Places. The large carbarn it once served was demolished in the 2000s.

PRL&P was reorganized as the Portland Electric Power Company (PEPCO) on April 26, 1924.

Two former PRL&P streetcar buildings are listed on the National Register of Historic Places. Bay E of the West Ankeny Carbarns was listed in 1978, and the Sellwood Division Carbarn Office and Clubhouse was listed in 2002. The company's 1911 hydroelectric facility in Estacada, Oregon, the River Mill Hydroelectric Project, is also listed on the NRHP.

== See also ==
- Portland General Electric
- Transportation in Oregon
