= Silk Centre =

Coordinates: 40.747°N 73.983°W

The Silk Centre was an area of business property, composed of buildings and lofts, which opened in Manhattan, in 1924. It was adjacent to a car-barn site, numerous clothing firms, and advertising agents located within a block or two of this corner. Harper & Brothers was also situated on East 33rd Street.

The Silk Centre was located in Midtown Manhattan between two great railroad terminals and close by the hotel district of New York City. The region radiating from 34th Street to Madison Avenue was well suited to the growth of the wholesale silk trades. In addition to its proximity to the railroad terminals, the silk hub benefited from a closeness to the elevated and surface lines of the subway and eighty-one clubs located within a few blocks of Madison Avenue and 34th Street. The significance of Madison Avenue as an impetus to the expansion of the silk trade was enhanced with its widening, by five feet on each side, extending from 23rd Street to 41st Street. This provided 70,400 square feet (6,540 m^{2}) of additional roadway.

== History of growth, 1914 - 1931 ==
One of the buildings at the Silk Centre was a twelve-story edifice located at 33 - 43 East 33rd Street. It was valued at $1,000,000 and was entirely rented for $145,000. The structure fronted East 33rd Street for 115.6 feet (35.2 m) and had a depth of 98.9 feet (30.1 m). It tenants were mostly engaged in the silk trade. The site for the building was purchased in 1913 from Dr. John B. Walker, who ran a private hospital there. It was sold to the George Backer Construction Company which completed the edifice in 1914.

In the fall of 1924 Cheney Brothers and Belding Brothers announced plans to relocate to the southeast and southwest corners of Madison Avenue. They awaited the completion of two buildings designed to their specifications. Their relocation designated the Madison Avenue area as a new axis of the silk industry. Schoolhouse & Company moved to the ground floor of a new building at the northwest corner of Madison Avenue and 39th Street. L.O. Thompson & Co. opened their headquarters on the second floor of an edifice on 244 Madison Avenue, at the southwest corner of Madison Avenue and 38th Street. L.D. Tompkins leased the second floor of the Cameron Building at the northeast corner of Madison Avenue and 34th Street. South of 34th Street on Madison Avenue was a region where a number of prominent silk houses found new locations and signed extended leases. One of these was the R & H Simon Company which moved from 4th Avenue and 20th Street to 159 Madison Avenue. Another was Menke Kaufmann & Co., which removed from lower 5th Avenue to East 33rd Street. The Golding Fabric Corporation was exceptional, having just moved to a spacious new location at 417 Fifth Avenue, in November 1924.

In early 1925 excavation began on land once occupied by the August Belmont home, at the southeast corner of Madison Avenue and 34th Street. A seventeen-story building was being planned for the site, to be occupied by a syndicate headed by Robert M. Catts. Cheney Brothers were to have offices on the first three stories of the structure. Silk manufacturer, Belding Brothers, purchased a plot of land measuring ninety feet on the southwest corner, directly opposite. The company was soon to occupy a sixteen or seventeen story edifice on the site.

The Heminway Silk Company signed a twenty-year lease to occupy the store, basement, second, and third floors of a fourteen-story building at the northwest corner of Madison Avenue and 37th Street. The total rental was $1,000,000. Heminway Silk Company, which had a capitalization of $3,500,000, was founded in Watertown, Connecticut in 1848. The firm opened a New York City office in 1872.

The Duplan Silk Corporation moved into three floors of the Continental Building, a forty two story office structure completed by Louis Adler in early 1931. The edifice was located at the southeast corner of 41st Street and Broadway. The lease totaled above $1,000,000 and included the second, third, and mezzanine floors of the banking concourse of the building. The three floors encompassed more than 30,000 square feet (2,800 m^{2}). The second floor was reached via a broad marble staircase leading from the main lobby fronting on Broadway. Previously the Duplan Silk Corporation was located on the east side of New York City for a dozen years. Earlier the firm was situated successively at Broome Street and Greene Street and Union Square. The business was a leader in the silk industry and one of its most recognized names.
