= Portland Street Railway Company =

19th century public transportation company in Portland, Oregon

Overview
- Owner: Ben Holladay (1872–1887); Ben Holladay trust (1887–1893); First Street Railway Company (1893–1896)
- Locale: Portland, Oregon, U.S.
- Termini: Glisan Street (north); Porter Street (south)

Service
- Type: Horsecar
- Services: 1
- Operator(s): Joseph Holladay (1887–1893)

History
- Opened: 1872
- Closed: 1896

Technical
- Line length: 2 mi (3.2 km)
- Number of tracks: 1
- Track gauge: 3 ft 6 in (1,067 mm)

The Portland Street Railway Company was the first mass transit company and streetcar line in Portland, Oregon, United States. Founded in 1872 by transportation magnate Ben Holladay, it operated horsecars on a two-mile (3.2 km) narrow gauge line on First Street, from a barn on Glisan Street in the north to Porter Street in the south.

== History ==
On April 19, 1871, Levi Estes, who together with D. S. Thompson owned sawmills on North Front Street, proposed to the Portland Common Council the operation of horse- or mule-drawn streetcars on First Street, among other streets. That September 12, the council approved Ordinance No. 1065, titled "An Ordinance Authorizing the Construction and Operation of Street Railways in the City of Portland", which granted the Portland Street Railway Company a 25-year franchise to operate a horsecar line down the length of First Street. At the time, most of Portland was located near the waterfront, making First Street the ideal spot for the new line. Construction of the line began on September 11, 1872. The horsecar rails were recycled from the Oregon Central Railroad by turning the iron upside down. Four "bobtail" cars were ordered for the company from Kimball & Company of San Francisco, California. After the cars arrived in October 1872 it was discovered that the cars would not fit the line and the entire track would have to be readjusted.

For the first time the cars were run on the track on December 7, 1872. The company started with a total of four cars and ten horses. Ben Holladay, the owner of the company, put his younger brother, Joseph Holladay, in charge of the company. The expansion of Portland inland, away from First Street, increased demand for a separate car line by the 1880s. On February 18, 1886, the City of Portland approved an ordinance allowing the Portland Street Railway Company to extend its line from Caruthers Street to Porter Street. After Ben Holladay's death in 1887, the Portland Street Railway Company was caught up in his estate. His brother was ordered to sell off the company to settle the estate. Joseph Holladay refused and went to Vancouver, Washington, to avoid authorities. Caught up in litigation, the Holladay estate increased in value, eventually enough for Joseph Holladay to return to Portland to reclaim the car franchise.

Upon Holladay's return he attempted to upgrade the line without success. He attempted to sell his company to property owners on First Street, but they wanted a new electric streetcar line. Finally, the city council granted the property owners of First Street an electric streetcar line with the condition that they buy out the horsecar company. After the First Street Railway Company took ownership they continued the horsecar line with just two cars, four horses and one conductor. When the contract expired in 1896 the company was dissolved.

== See also ==
- Rail transport in Oregon
