= Bay E, West Ankeny Car Barns =

Historic building in Portland, Oregon, U.S.

- U.S. National Register of Historic Places
- Portland Historic Landmark
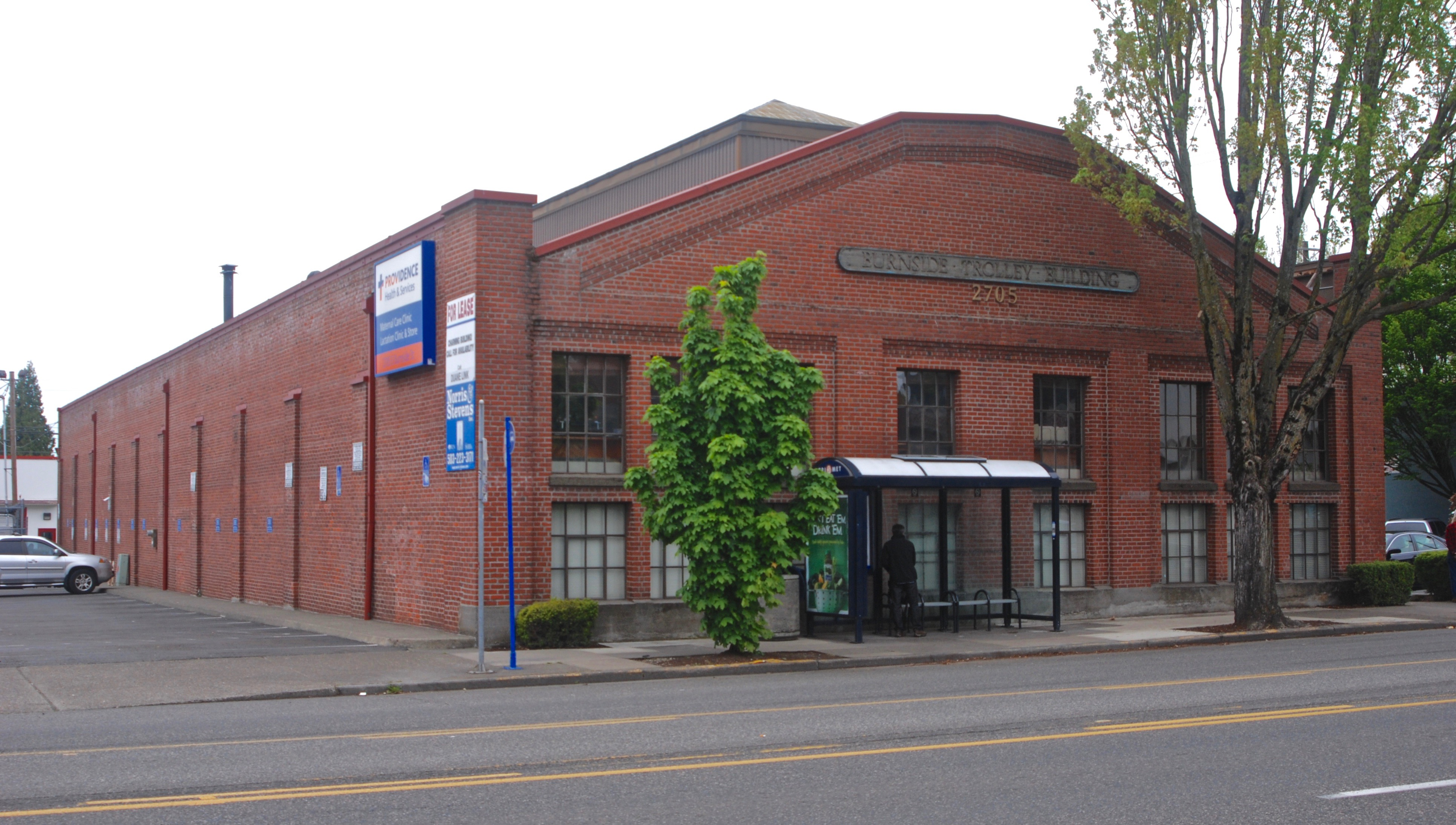
- The west and south sides of the building in 2015

- Location within Portland, Oregon Location within Oregon Location within the United States
- Location: 2706 NE Couch St., Portland, Oregon
- Coordinates: 45°31′23.6″N 122°38′16.7″W
- Area: 0.5 acres (0.20 ha)
- Built: 1911
- NRHP reference No.: 78002307
- Added to NRHP: October 10, 1978

The West Ankeny Car Barns Bay E is a former streetcar carbarn in Portland, Oregon, that is listed on the U.S. National Register of Historic Places. Completed in 1911, it was one of three buildings that collectively made up the Ankeny Car Barns complex of the Portland Railway, Light and Power Company (PRL&P), the owner and operator of Portland's streetcar system at the time. By 1978, the brick building had become the only surviving structure from the Ankeny complex and one of only two surviving remnants of carbarn complexes of the Portland area's large street railway and interurban system of the past, the other being the PRL&P's Sellwood Division Carbarn Office and Clubhouse.

The original Ankeny carbarn was built in 1892 by the City and Suburban Railway Company, one of PRL&P's predecessors. It was located at 24th and East Ankeny, but after fire destroyed it in 1894 it was rebuilt at 28th and East Burnside, on the east side of 28th. The complex was expanded in 1901 and 1910 through the construction of additional buildings, including Bays D and E, located west of 28th Avenue between Burnside and Couch streets. The building known then as Bay E was last used by streetcars in the early 1950s and was sold in 1954 to Bitar Brothers. It was eventually converted into an office building, and is known as the Burnside Trolley Building (with address of 2705 E. Burnside Street).

== See also ==
- National Register of Historic Places listings in Northeast Portland, Oregon
