= Portland Railway, Light and Power Sellwood Division Carbarn Office and Clubhouse =

Historic building in Portland, Oregon, U.S.

- U.S. National Register of Historic Places
- Portland Historic Landmark
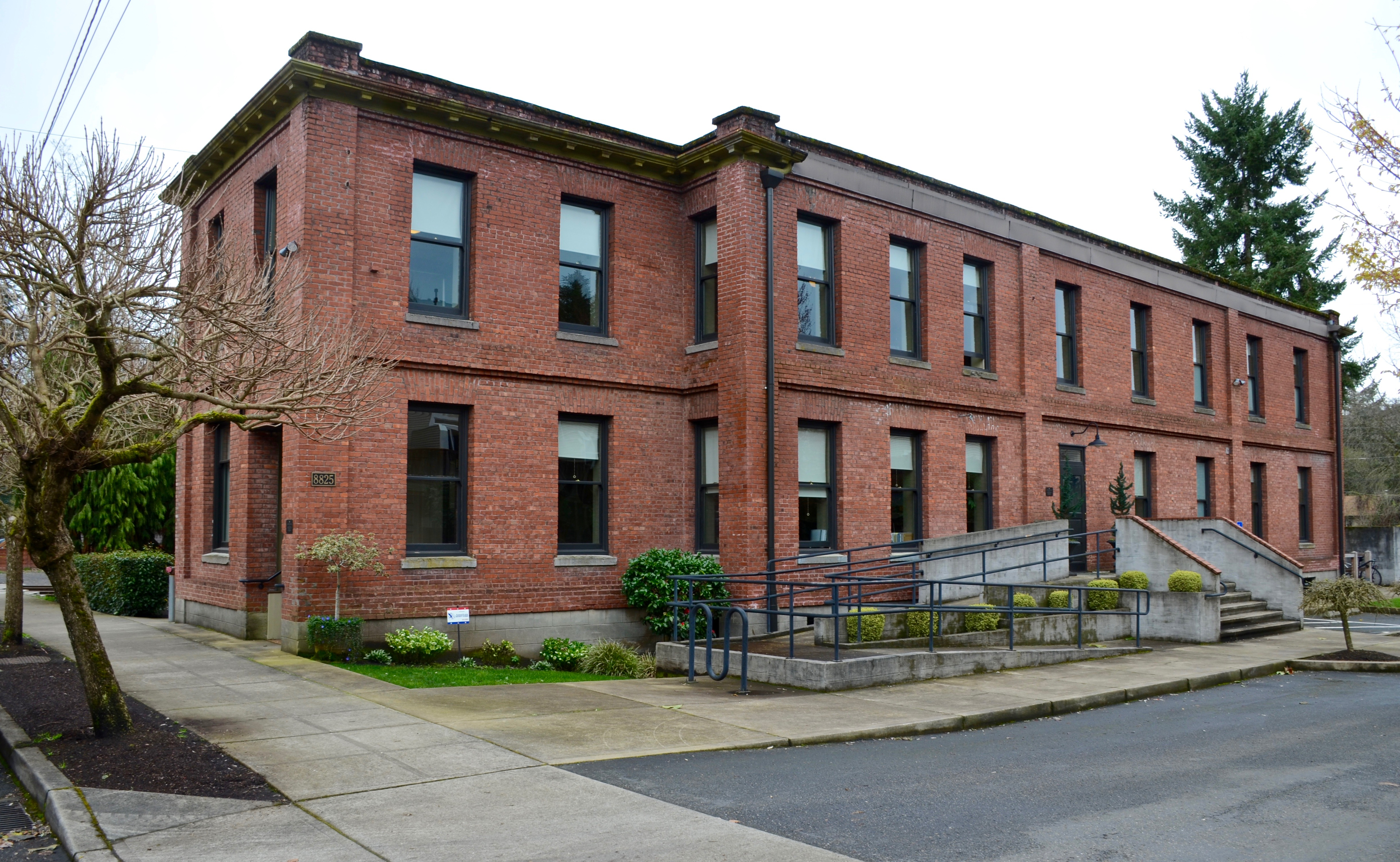
- The former PRL&P Sellwood clubhouse in 2016

- Location within Portland, Oregon Location within Oregon Location within the United States
- Location: 8825 SE 11th Avenue; Portland, Oregon
- Coordinates: 45°27′32″N 122°39′19″W
- Area: 7,914-square-foot (735.2 m^{2}) interior on a 0.4-acre (0.16 ha) lot
- Built: 1910
- Architectural style: Industrial
- NRHP reference No.: 02000670
- Added to NRHP: June 20, 2002

The Portland Railway, Light and Power Sellwood Division Carbarn Office and Clubhouse, also known as Carmen's Clubhouse, in southeast Portland in the U.S. state of Oregon, is a former commercial transportation building listed on the National Register of Historic Places (NRHP). Built in 1910 by the Portland Railway, Light and Power Company (PRL&P), it was added to the register in 2002. The structure was associated with Portland's street railway and interurban system of the late 19th and early 20th centuries.

Employees of PRL&P's transit division often worked 365 days a year and were expected to perform a variety of tasks including selling tickets, collecting fares, operating and cleaning streetcars, and writing reports. The clubhouse offered a few amenities for these workers. Although the first floor of the two-story building was used mainly for the trainmaster's office, a lost-and-found department, and record storage, it also included three shower-baths and a toilet. On the second floor were billiard tables, a gin rummy table, emergency sleeping rooms, and a reading room with books, desks, and writing materials. The furnace was in the basement, which also contained a toilet and a set of safe deposit boxes.

== History ==
The Sellwood Division clubhouse, carbarns, and power plant were part of Portland's interurban and city trolley system. After this system was expanded in 1889 from downtown Portland across the Willamette River on the Steel Bridge to Albina, it was gradually extended south along the east bank of the river. It reached Sellwood in 1892 and Oregon City in 1893.

Sellwood, originally an independent city, became part of Portland in 1893. As population increased on the east bank, the line's ridership rose, peaking around 1915 when the Sellwood Division maintained 110 city cars and 30 interurban cars. By 1926, these numbers had dropped to 70 and 22, as economic conditions and commuter habits changed in the age of the automobile and bus. The trainmen's clubhouse closed in 1938; the last trolley ran in 1958. Although similar complexes were built for the Ankeny, Piedmont, and Savier divisions of the street railway system, the Sellwood Division buildings and one building of the former Ankeny carbarn complex are the only surviving remnants of the eight carbarns that once served the Portland area's past electric railway system.

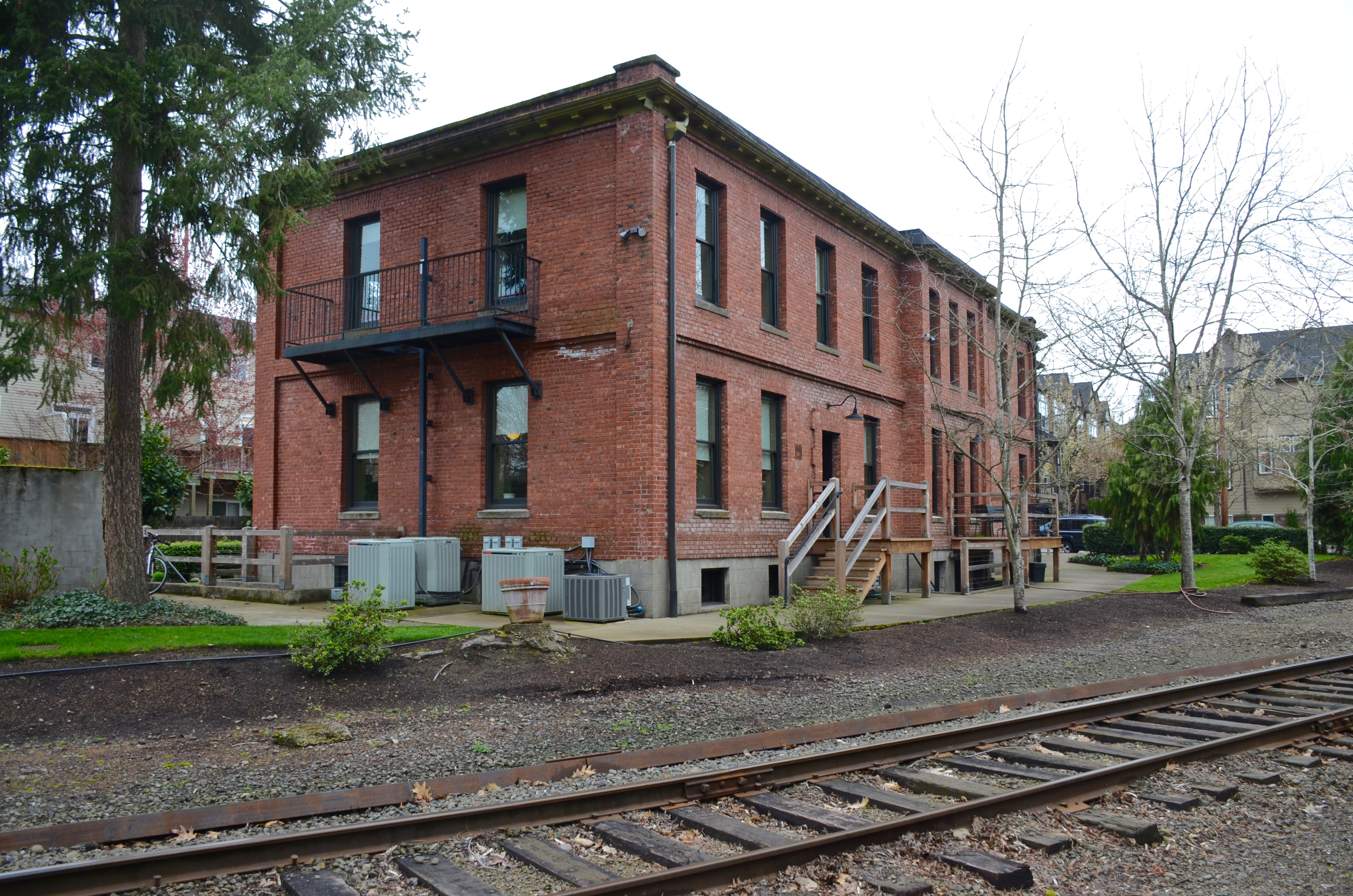
The building's south side is still passed by tracks, a freight line now owned by the Oregon Pacific Railroad.

In 1939, the United States Forest Service took over the building for use by the Civilian Conservation Corps and bought the clubhouse and the car barns three years later. Through 1984 it used the clubhouse for storage and as a forest pest research center. After vacating the building, the Forest Service used the adjacent property and outbuildings for storage through 1993, selling everything (with a protective historic-resource covenant for the clubhouse) to private owners in 1996. Vacant until 2002, the building was restored, added to the NRHP, and turned into the home of the Dunthorpe Marketing Group.

== See also ==
- National Register of Historic Places listings in Southeast Portland, Oregon
