= Newton Street Railway Carbarn =

- U.S. National Register of Historic Places
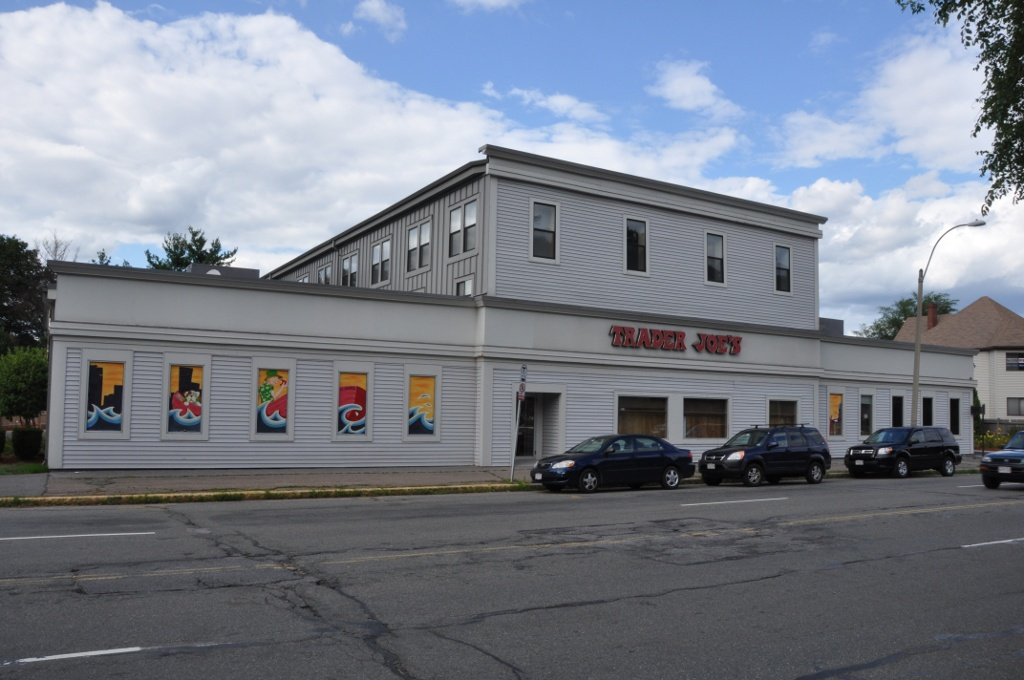

- Location within Massachusetts Location within the United States
- Location: 1121 Washington St., Newton, Massachusetts
- Coordinates: 42°20′58″N 71°13′13″W
- Built: 1890
- MPS: Newton MRA
- NRHP reference No.: 86001855
- Added to NRHP: September 04, 1986

The Newton Street Railway Carbarn is an historic building located at 1121 Washington Street in the village of West Newton in Newton, Massachusetts. Built in 1890 by the Newton Street Railway Company, it is a rare surviving example of a wood-frame trolley car garage facility, a facility once common in areas served by electrified trolleys. The building has a long two-story central section with extended single-story wings. It has been extensively remodeled and modernized and is now a commercial building with a restaurant, grocery store, and offices.

On September 4, 1986, it was added to the National Register of Historic Places.

== See also ==
- National Register of Historic Places listings in Newton, Massachusetts
