= List of heritage railways in Canada =

This is a list of heritage railways in Canada. For convenience, heritage tramways have also been included. As of 2026, British Columbia has the most operational heritage railways.

== Current heritage railways ==
=== Alberta ===
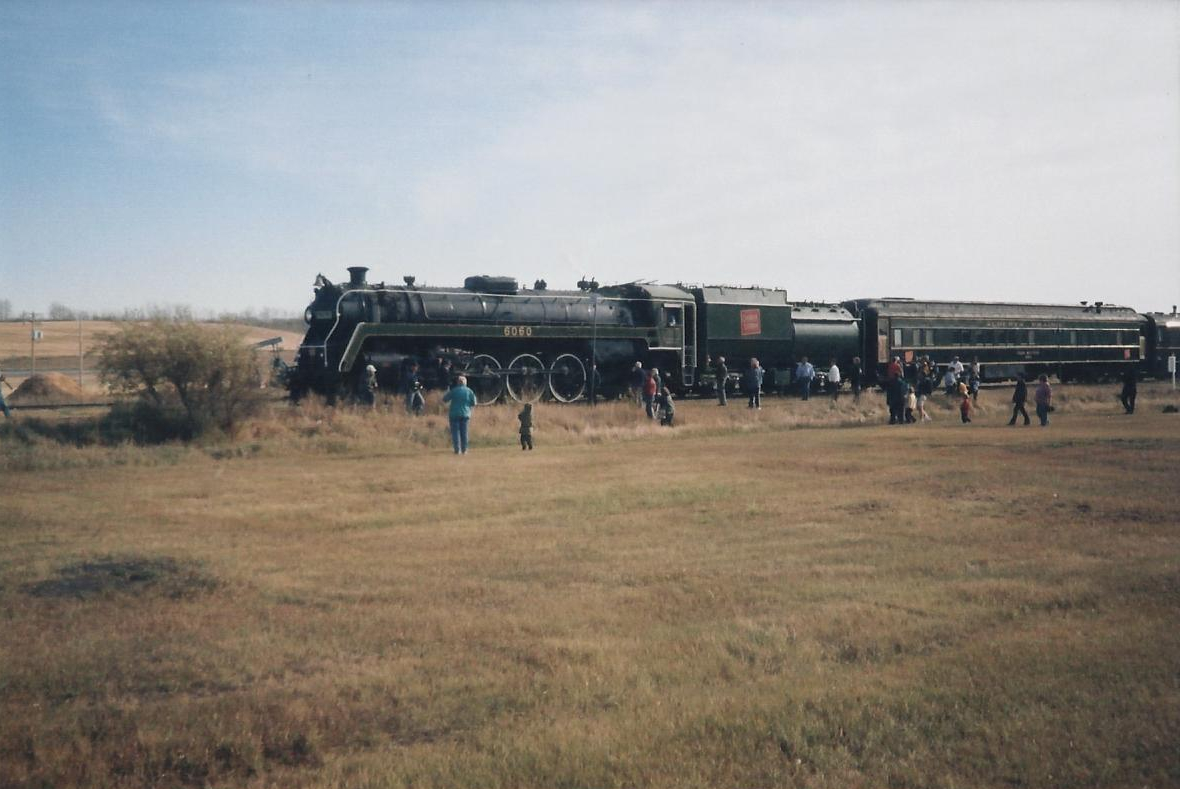
Canadian National No. 6060 hauling an excursion for Alberta Prairie Railway Excursions in Big Valley on 7 October 2001

- Alberta Central Railway Museum
- Alberta Railway Museum
- Alberta Prairie Railway Excursions
- Aspen Crossing Railway
- Fort Edmonton Park Railway
- Fort Edmonton Park Streetcar
- Galt Historic Railway Park
- Heritage Park Historical Village Railway

=== British Columbia ===
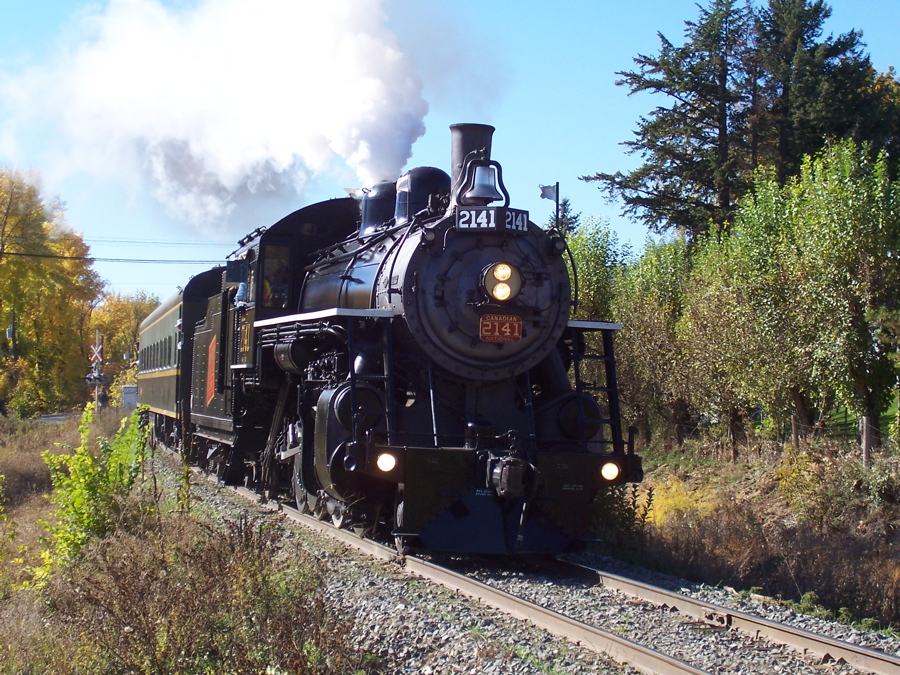
No. 2141 Spirit of Kamloops running for the Kamloops Heritage Railway

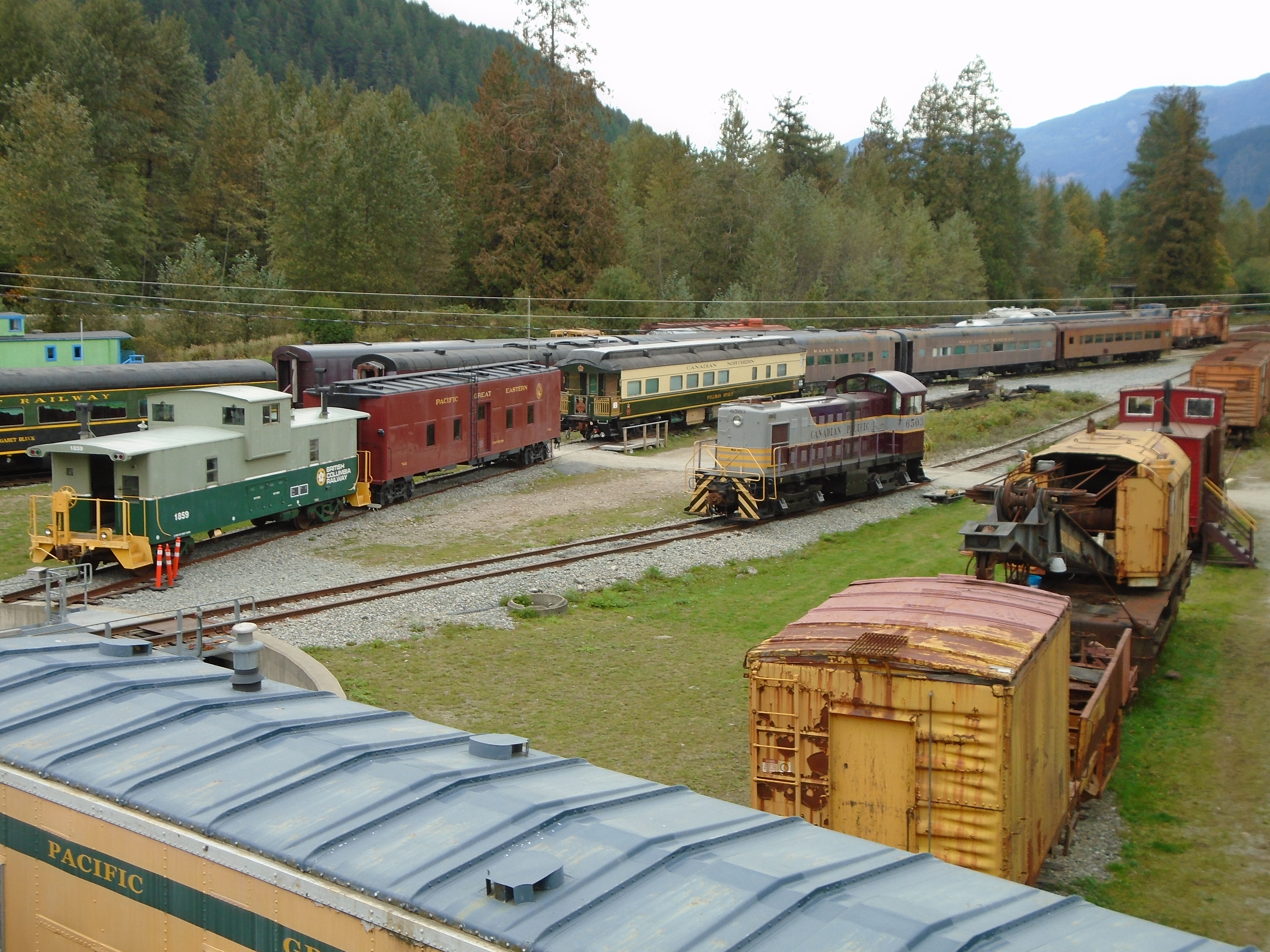
An assortment of rolling stock on display at the Railway Museum of British Columbia in 2018

- Alberni Pacific Railway
- BC Forest Discovery Centre
- Fraser Valley Heritage Railway
- Fort Steele Heritage Town
- Kamloops Heritage Railway
- Kettle Valley Steam Railway
- Nelson Electric Tramway
- Prince George Railway and Forestry Museum
- Railway Museum of British Columbia
- Steveston Tram Museum

=== Manitoba ===
- Prairie Dog Central Railway

=== New Brunswick ===
- New Brunswick Railway Museum

=== Ontario ===
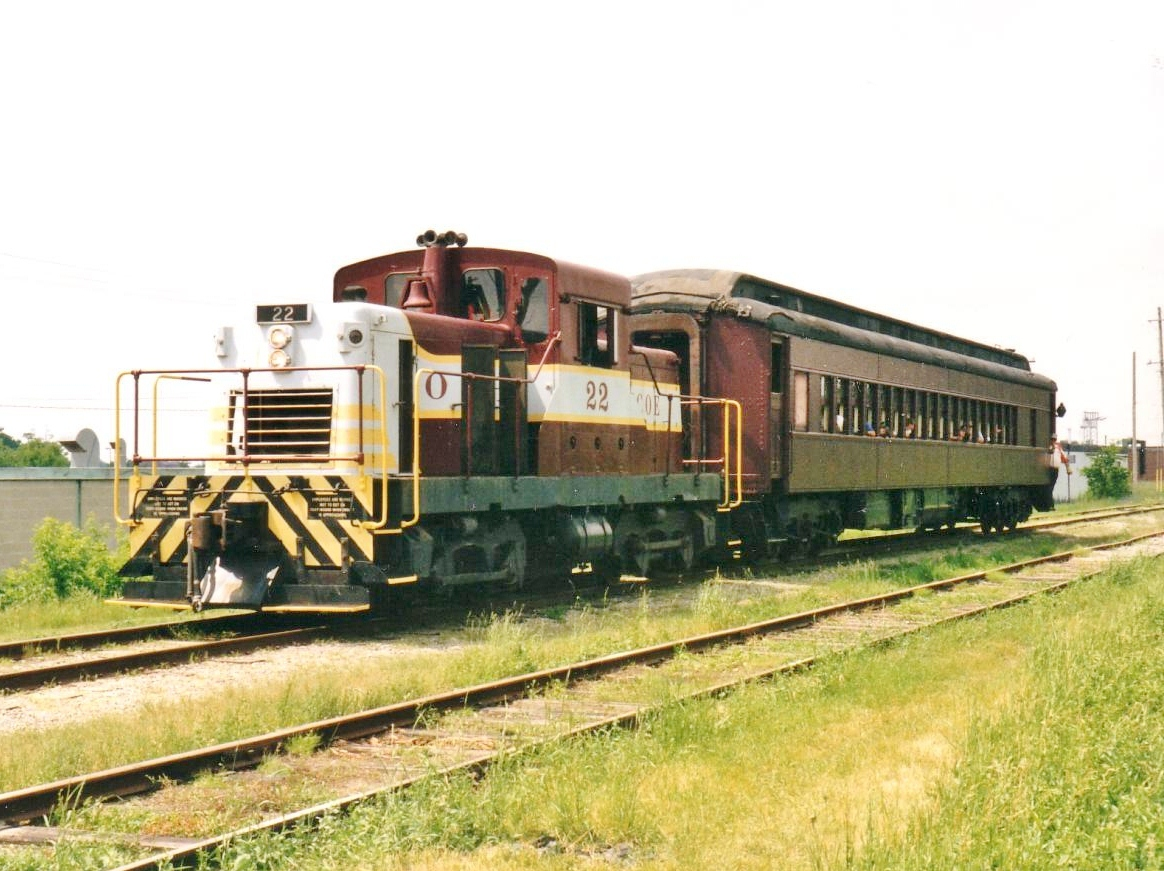
Ex-Canadian Pacific No. 22 with a restored passenger car on the South Simcoe Railway in July 1992

- Agawa Canyon Tour Train
- Halton County Radial Railway
- Muskoka Heritage Place
- Port Stanley Terminal Rail
- South Simcoe Railway
- Waterloo Central Railway

=== Quebec ===
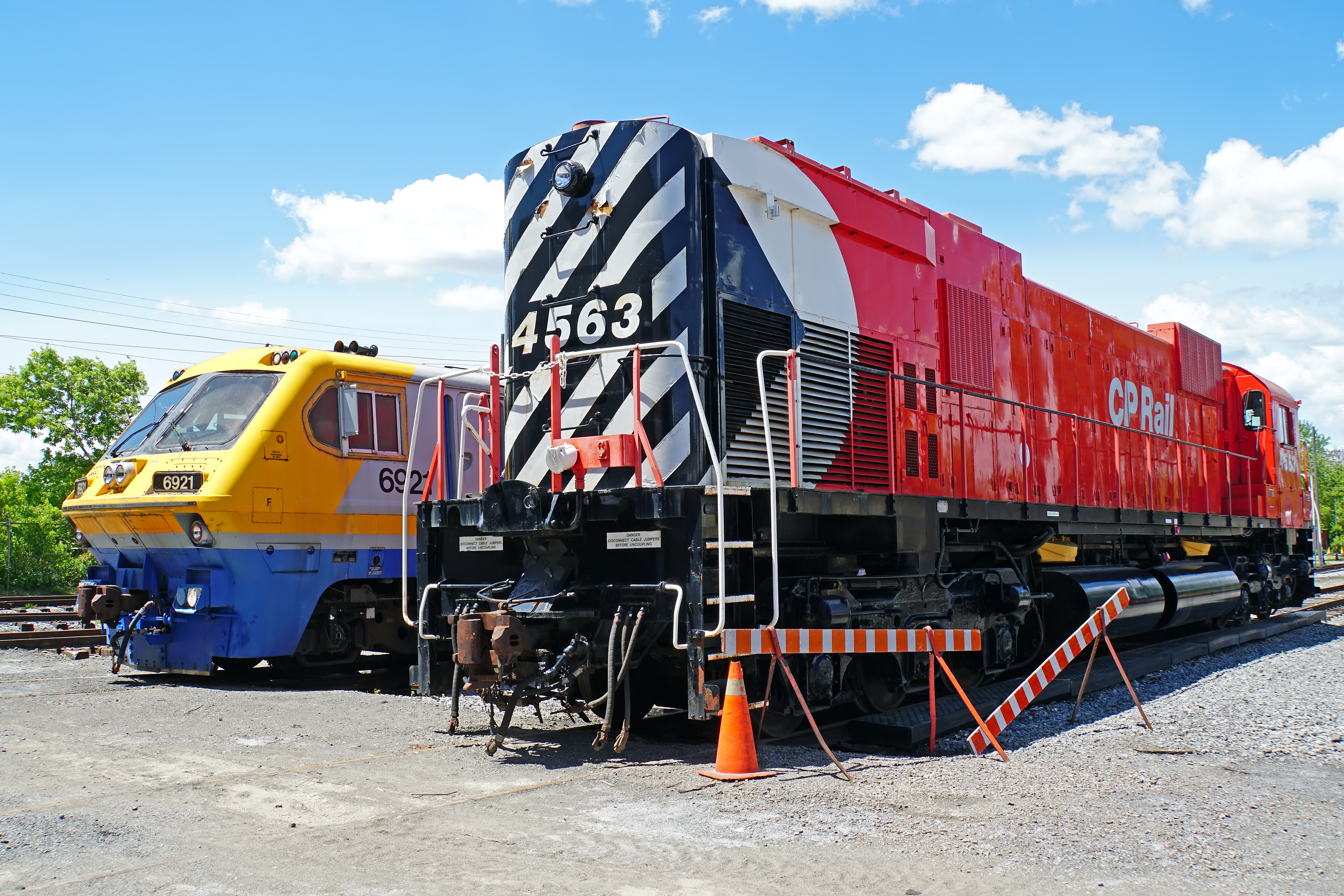
Canadian Pacific No. 4563 and VIA Rail No. 6921 on display at the Canadian Railway Museum

- Canadian Railway Museum
- Charlevoix Railway

=== Saskatchewan ===
- Southern Prairie Railway
- Wheatland Express Excursion Train

=== Yukon ===
- Whitehorse Waterfront Trolley
- White Pass and Yukon Route

== Former heritage railways ==
- Hull–Chelsea–Wakefield Railway
- Orford Express
- Port Elgin and North Shore Railroad
- Vancouver Downtown Historic Railway
- Waterloo-St. Jacobs Railway
- York–Durham Heritage Railway

== Standard services operating heritage equipment ==
While not considered heritage railways, four passenger railways operate equipment built in the 1960s and earlier.

- Ontario Northland Railway operates a passenger service between Cochrane and Moosonee making use of a fleet with heritage value.
- The Royal Canadian Pacific uses restored equipment built between 1916 and 1931 to haul its luxury excursion train.
- The Tshiuetin Railway in Labrador operates a vintage fleet of passenger cars in regular service.
- Via Rail Canada operates equipment dating back as far as 1947 on all its routes, notably featuring Park cars built by Canadian Pacific Railway on The Canadian, The Ocean, the Jasper-Prince Rupert train, and the Winnipeg-Churchill train. Illustrating the heritage value of this fleet, one of its cars is already on display at Canadian Railway Museum in Saint-Constant, Quebec. Via Rail also continues to operate RDCs on the Sudbury-White River train in Ontario.

== See also ==
- List of Canadian railways
- List of heritage railways
