= Nelson Electric Tramway =

Heritage tramway in British Columbia, Canada

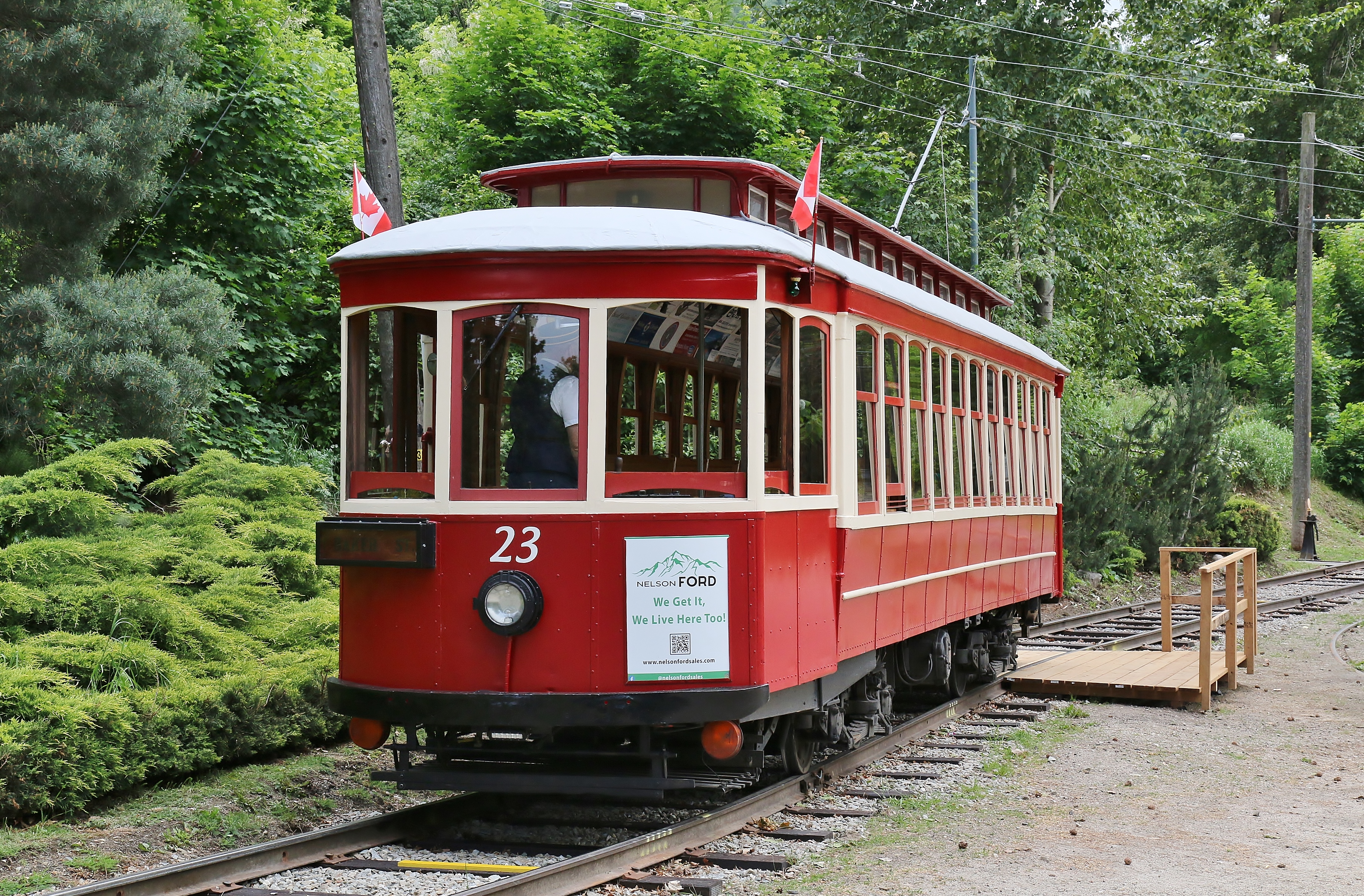
- Streetcar 23 at Museum Station

Overview
- Locale: Nelson, British Columbia
- Transit type: Heritage streetcar, seasonal
- Number of lines: 1
- Number of stations: 4
- Website: https://www.nelsonstreetcar.org/

Operation
- Began operation: July 1992
- Operator: Nelson Electric Tramway Society
- Number of vehicles: 2
- Headway: 30 minutes

Technical
- System length: 2 kilometres (1.2 mi)
- No. of tracks: 1
- Track gauge: 4 ft 8 1/2 in (1,435 mm)
- Old gauge: 4 ft 8 1/2 in (1,435 mm)
- Electrification: 600 V DC, overhead wires

The Nelson Electric Tramway is a heritage railway at Nelson in the Kootenay region of southeastern British Columbia. It is one of two operational historic tram systems in the province.

== Former tramway ==
- 1899: Nelson Electric Tramway Co. Ltd. inaugurated service along Front St. on December 21. Opening of the hill section was postponed after Car 2 derailed causing serious injuries.
- 1900: Hill section opened on April 8.
- 1905: City contracted to operate the system for four years, because the company had incurred losses every year.
- 1908: A fire in the substation on April 25 caused extensive damage. A fire in the car barn on April 27 destroyed the building and two streetcars. Service was suspended.
- 1910: Newly formed Nelson Street Railway Co. reopened the system on November 8.
- 1914: City purchased the system on February 1, because the company had incurred ongoing losses.
- 1949: Final run when diesel buses replaced rails on June 20.

== Heritage timeline ==
- 1980: Private owner wished to dispose of Car 23 and the bridge from the Nasookin. The city considered acquiring the former for restoration as a bus stop shelter.
- 1982: Chamber of commerce acquired and moved Car 23 to an indoor facility at Selkirk College. The chamber and college obtained a federal grant to begin restoration.
- 1984: Second federal grant for $26,000 received.
- 1985: Project shifted from producing a static exhibit to an operational car.
- 1987: Third federal grant for $104,000 received.
- 1988: Car 23 moved into a temporary car barn on the southeast corner of Hall and Front streets. The Nelson Electric Tramway Society incorporated. The chamber gave the society title to the facility, and various tramway artifacts.
- 1989: Provincial grant for $430,000 received. Canadian Pacific Railway (CP) donated rails salvaged from the Rosebery–Nakusp line abandonment.
- 1990: CP employee volunteers began laying track. Permanent car barn built and Car 23 moved in. Car 400 arrived.
- 1991: Chamber transferred ownership of Car 23 to the society. Track laying completed.
- 1992: Overhead wiring and substation completed. On June 15, passenger service began. On July 1, the official opening was held.
- 2011: Annual ridership set a record of over 15,000. Restoration work on Car 400 was completed. Car 400 operated for the first time since 1948.
- 2012: Spring flooding along the lakeshore caused $15,000 in damages to the streetcar tracks and the storage barn, plus about $7,500 in lost revenue because of a two-month shortening of the tourism season.
- 2015: Car barn museum (Walt Laurie Memorial Museum) opened, displaying artifacts and photos within a dedicated space and also throughout the barn.
- 2024: 100 years of Streetcar 23 in Nelson.

== Operation ==
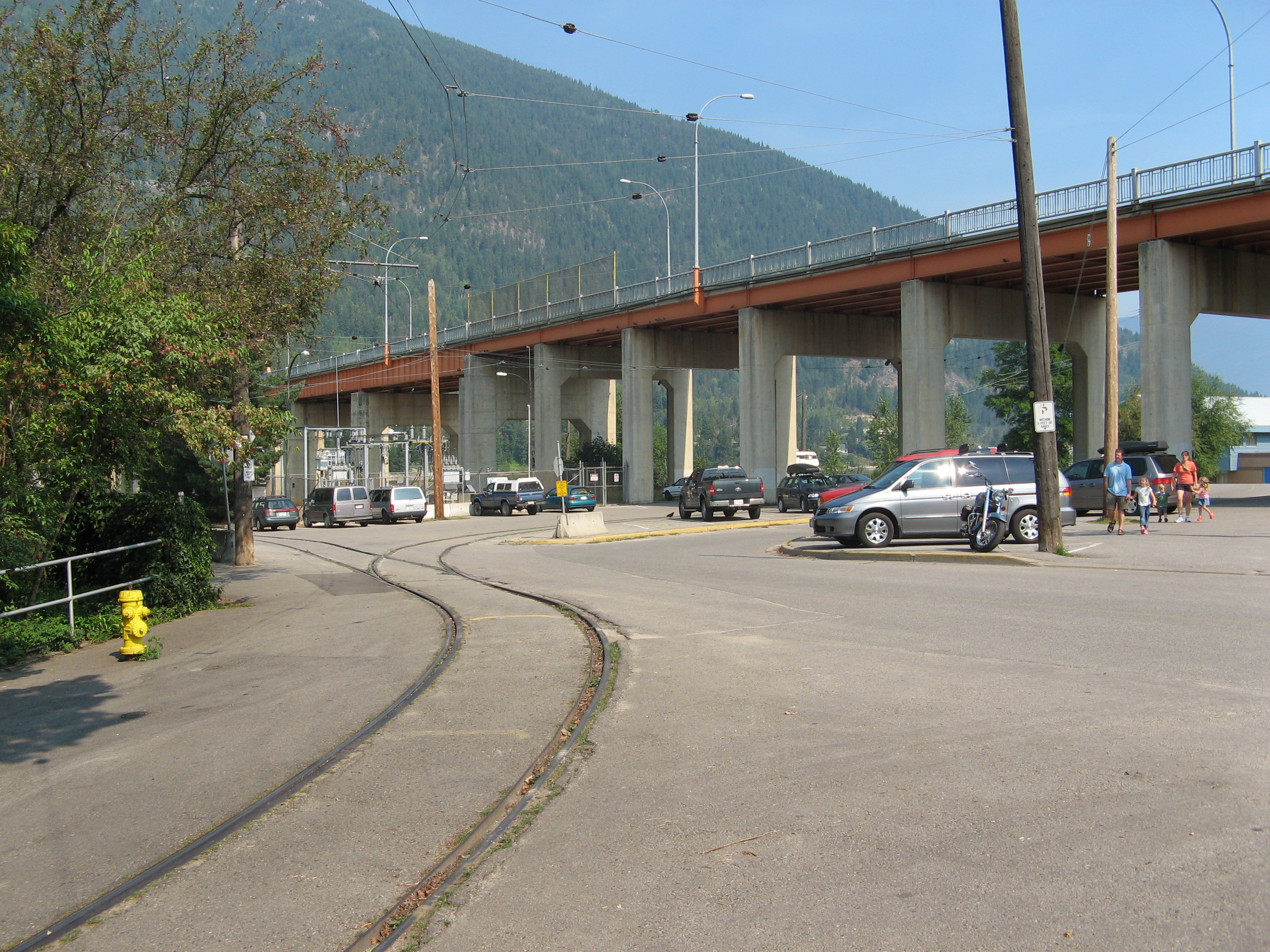
Terminal loop of Nelson Electric Tramway, British Columbia, Canada, on 15 August 2006

The non-profit Nelson Electric Tramway Society (NETS), which adopted the name of the town's first streetcar company, was the first operating heritage streetcar line in BC. Since the closure of the Vancouver Downtown Historic Railway in 2011, only one other system remains (Fraser Valley Heritage Railway). The Nelson Electric Tramway is the only one that utilizes an overhead wire for power.

The single-track railway runs along Nelson's waterfront from a loop under the orange bridge (at the northeast end of Rotary Heritage Park) to a loop at Hall St. (adjacent to the northeast perimeter of the airport). The society has two restored vintage streetcars. The service is seasonal, starting on the May long weekend and ending on the Canadian Thanksgiving weekend.

== Fleet ==
=== Car 23 ===
Car 23 was built in 1906 by the John Stephenson Company (then owned by the J. G. Brill Company) for Cleveland, Ohio's short-lived Forest City Railway (fleet No. 3334). in 1908 the car was renumbered to 934 and converted to single end operation. The car was purchased in 1924 by the City of Nelson and used as a spare car, bringing the fleet total to 3 streetcars, the smallest in the British Empire. In 1930 the car was renumbered from "3" to "23", and it remained in service until the 1949 closure of the system. The body of the car was used as a dog kennel, skating rink shelter and a craft shop. Acquired in poor condition in 1982, the car body was restored by students at Selkirk College. Later, replica trucks were fabricated, so that the car could be returned to operating condition. Streetcar 23 made its first revenue service on July 1, 1992.

=== Car 400 ===
Birney-type car 400 was originally ordered in 1921 by the British Columbia Electric Railway (BCER) from the Preston Car Company. It was made in Preston, Ontario, and shipped in parts to the BCER for final assembly at their yards in Vancouver before entering service in Victoria, British Columbia in March 1922. The car was retired from service in 1948, then sold to the Mayo Lumber Company in Cowichan Lake to be used as a bunkhouse. Purchased in 1970 by the provincial transportation museum, in Cloverdale, the car was restored in 1973 for static display. Car 400 was leased by the Nelson Electric Tramway Society in 1990 and with the closure of the museum in 1992, Nelson became car 400's permanent home. Car 400 is not in regular service, as its wheelbase is too short to negotiate the sharply-curved terminus loops. All scheduled trips use car 23, except that, as the route runs close to Kootenay Lake, on the rare occasions that flooding occurs along the route making part of the tracks inaccessible, car 400 takes over service as it can operate in either direction and therefore does not need to use turning loops.

== See also ==
- List of street railways in Canada
- Streetcars in North America
- List of heritage railways in Canada
