= Steveston Tram Museum =

Museum in Richmond, British Columbia

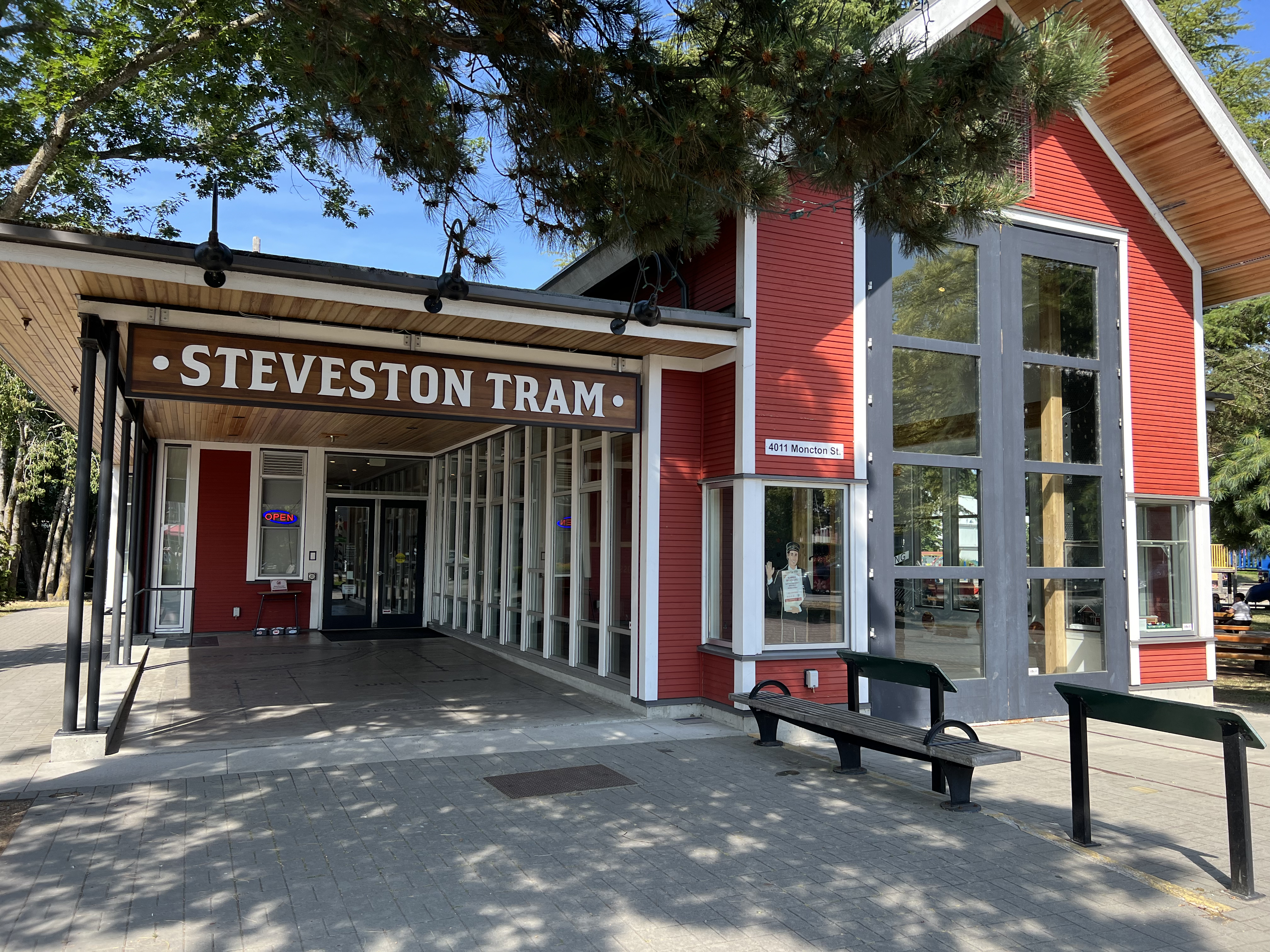
- Established: May 3, 2013
- Location: Richmond, BC, Canada
- Coordinates: 49°07′31.8″N 123°10′50.8″W
- Type: Railway Museum
- Public transit access: Steveston Exchange
- Website: stevestonheritage.ca/visit/steveston-tram/

The Steveston Tram Museum is a rail museum in the Steveston neighbourhood of Richmond, British Columbia. The museum houses one of seven remaining interurban streetcars that previously operated as part of the British Columbia Electric Railway (BCER).

== History ==
In the 1890s, the Canadian Pacific Railway sought to create a company to serve Lulu Island. In 1902 a light-rail line was created that ran from Vancouver to Steveston. The route proved to be unprofitable for CPR, as it was cheaper for local canneries to ship directly by boat in Steveston rather than moving them to and shipping from Vancouver. Thus, the line was leased to the B.C. Electric Railway in 1905. The BCER created a substation at Marpole to power the new electric line. Passenger service launched on July 4, 1905 and ran until February 28, 1958.

Tram car 1220 was built in 1912 by the St. Louis Car Company, and purchased by the BCER in 1913. This streetcar ran throughout the BCER's system for 45 years before being retired in 1958. The train was brought to BC and used in the Marpole to Steveston line of the BCER.

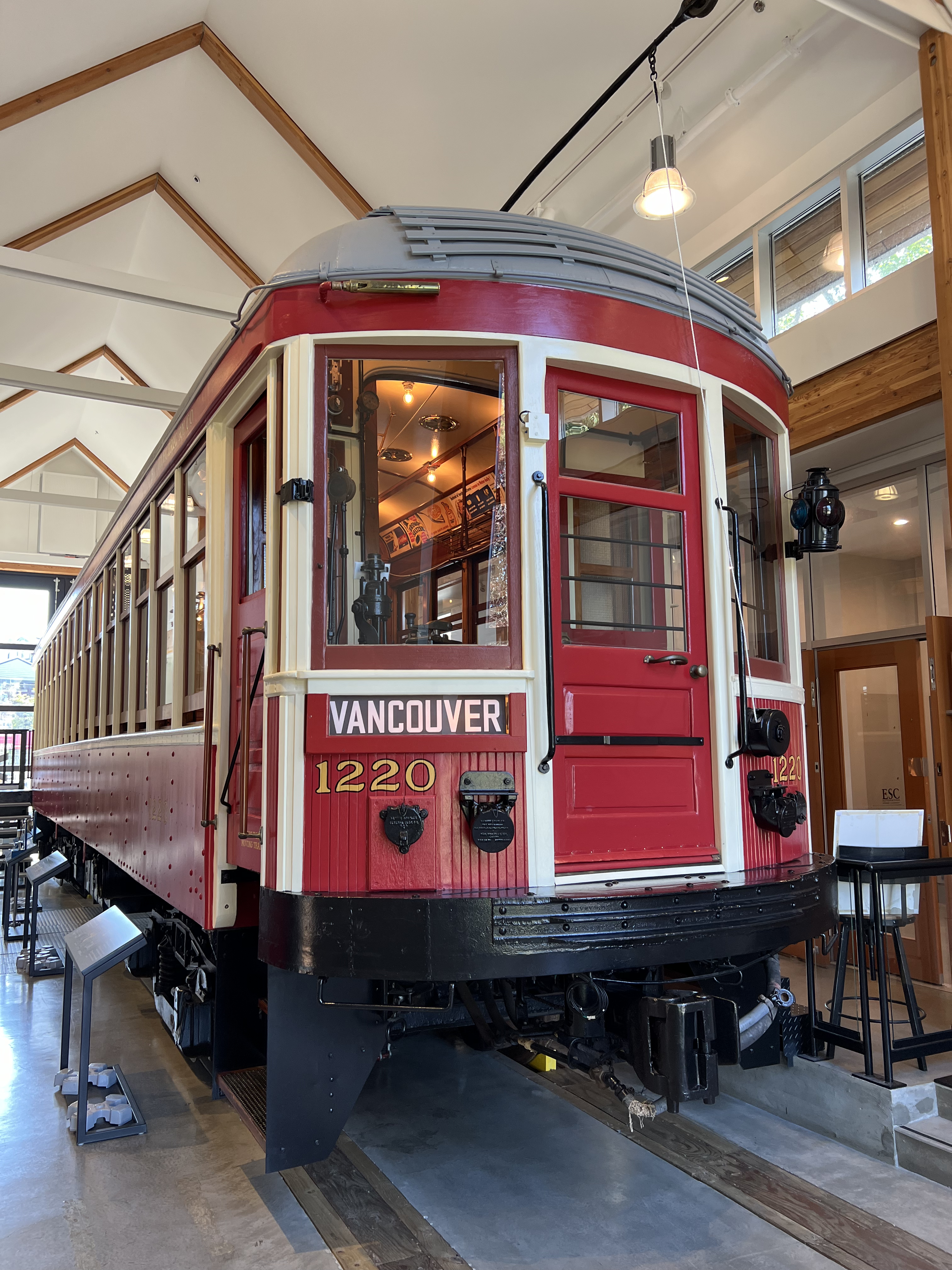
Car 1220 on display at the Steveston Tram Museum

== Museum ==
The museum opened on May 3, 2013. The museum was built around original tracks of the BCER, and stands across the street from the now gone Steveston station. After three years of restoration, costing $400,000 and funded by the city of Richmond, the restored tram was put on display in 2018.

Streetcar 1220 is brought outside of the museum annually on July 1st as part of Steveston's Canada Day celebrations.

Of the twenty-eight 1200-class trams created for the BCER by the St. Louis Car Company, seven exist in various states of repair. In addition to car 1220 at the Steveston Tram Museum, number 1225 is operating as a heritage streetcar at the Fraser Valley Heritage Railway Society in Surrey, BC, and car number 1223 is on static display at the Burnaby Village Museum.
