= Port Elgin and North Shore Railroad =

Coordinates: 44.4429°N 81.4027°W

- Locale: Ontario

Commercial operations
- Built by: H.E. Schlenker and Sons, Port Elgin, Ontario
- Original gauge: 16 inches

Preserved operations
- Stations: North Shore Park and Port Elgin Main Beach
- Length: 1 mi (1.6 km)
- Preserved gauge: 2 ft (610 mm)

Commercial history
- Opened: 1973
- Closed: 2018

Preservation history
- Headquarters: Port Elgin

Website
- Port Elgin and North Shore Railroad

The Port Elgin and North Shore Railroad was a 16 in (406 mm) miniature heritage railway in Port Elgin, Ontario.

The history of the Port Elgin and North Shore Railroad dates back to the early 1970s when a local tool and die maker endeavored to establish a park train tourist attraction in Port Elgin's North Shore Park. This gentleman's name is Doug Schlenker and with the help of his father, Doug started building the little railroad in 1971. It opened for business in August 1973. This first version of the railroad only ran in the North Shore Park. In fact, some of the original right of way on the east side of the park is still visible today.

In late 1978, Doug sold the entire railroad to a Collingwood, Ontario tourist attraction known as the Scenic Caves. Its career in Collingwood was short lived due to very steep grades and a general lack of mechanical expertise. By 1984, the owner gave up and abandoned the whole system in a wooded area on the Blue Mountain property. Meanwhile, the success and fame of the original train (now in Collingwood) as a Port Elgin tourist attraction was recreated by local investors when another park train system became available. The second version of the Port Elgin and North Shore Railroad (1983-2018) was much larger than the original with a track gauge of 24 inches. Unlike the original, its terminus was on the beach. The new train ran from “The Station”, along the harbour, through the park and back. Generally, most of the original right of way was reused in the park.

The second version operated excursion trains along the beach on a 1-mile (1.6 km) route in Port Elgin. The round trip took approximately 20 minutes.Trains on the PE & NS were scheduled on weekends in June from 11 a.m. to 8 p.m. with cooperative weather (meaning no rain or wind), and from June 20 until September 7 days a week from 10 a.m. to 10 p.m. September had the same schedule as June. In the summer, trains ran as frequently as five times per day except on Mondays.

The line closed down in 2018, when the owners Andy and Debbie Hess were unable to renegotiate the lease with the municipality. In May 2020, the town demolished the line's railway station.

Scott Pearson of Smithville Ontario is the current owner of the original Port Elgin and North Shore Railroad.

The location of the locomotive and rolling stock from the second operation is unknown.

== See also ==
- List of heritage railways in Canada
