= Flatcar =

Type of railroad car for transporting large objects, containers, or machinery

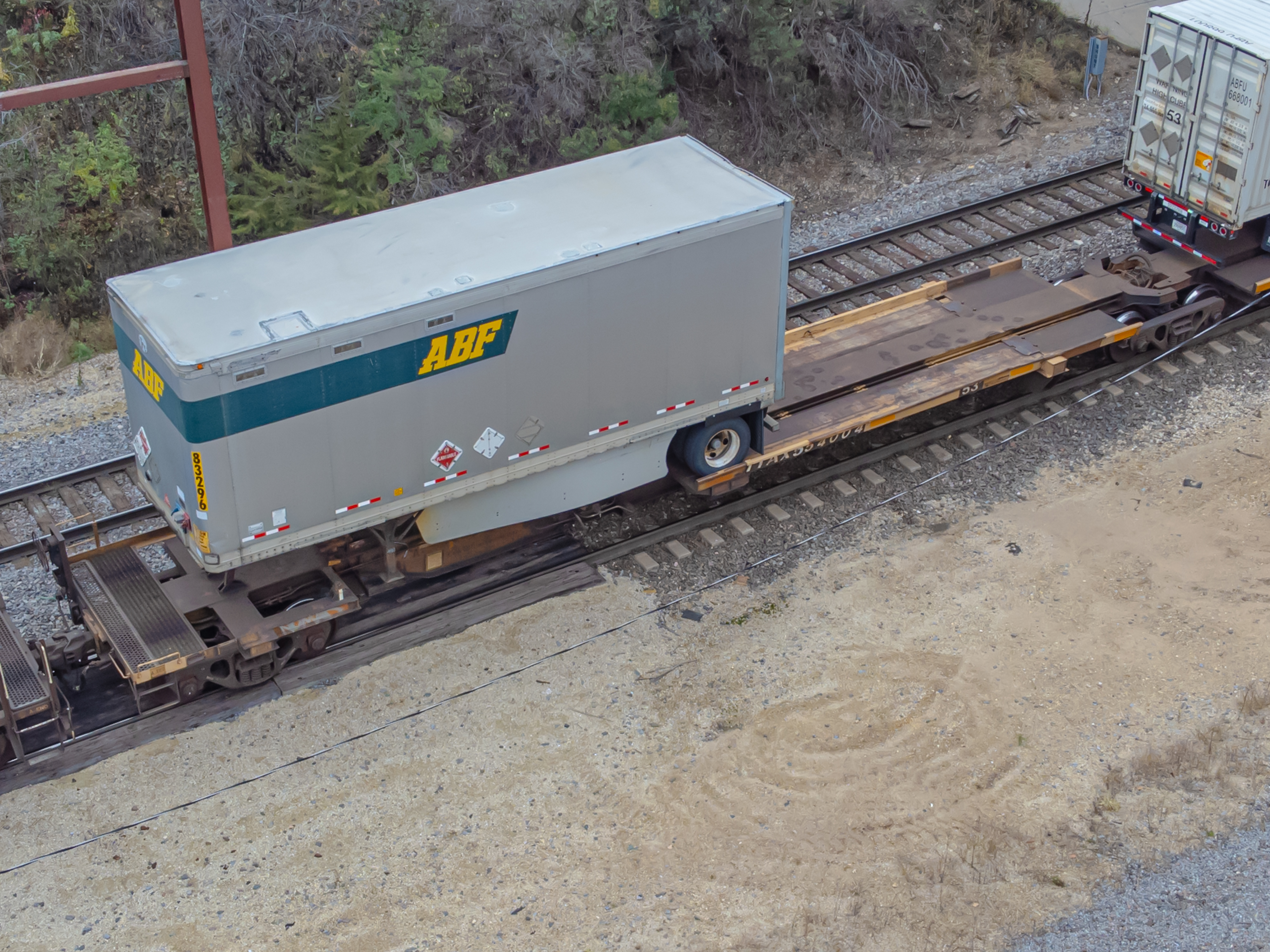
Spine car with one pup trailer

A flatcar (US) (also flat car, or flatbed) is a piece of rolling stock that consists of an open, flat deck mounted on trucks (US) or bogies (UK) at each end. Occasionally, flat cars designed to carry extra heavy or extra large loads are mounted on a pair (or rarely, more) of bogies under each end. The deck of the car can be wood or steel, and the sides of the deck can include pockets for stakes or tie-down points to secure loads. Flatcars designed for carrying machinery have sliding chain assemblies recessed in the deck.

Flatcars are used for loads that are too large or cumbersome to load in enclosed cars such as boxcars, but which will not be harmed by the weather. They are also often used to transport intermodal containers (shipping containers) or trailers as part of intermodal freight transport shipping.

== Specialized types ==
=== Aircraft parts flatcars ===
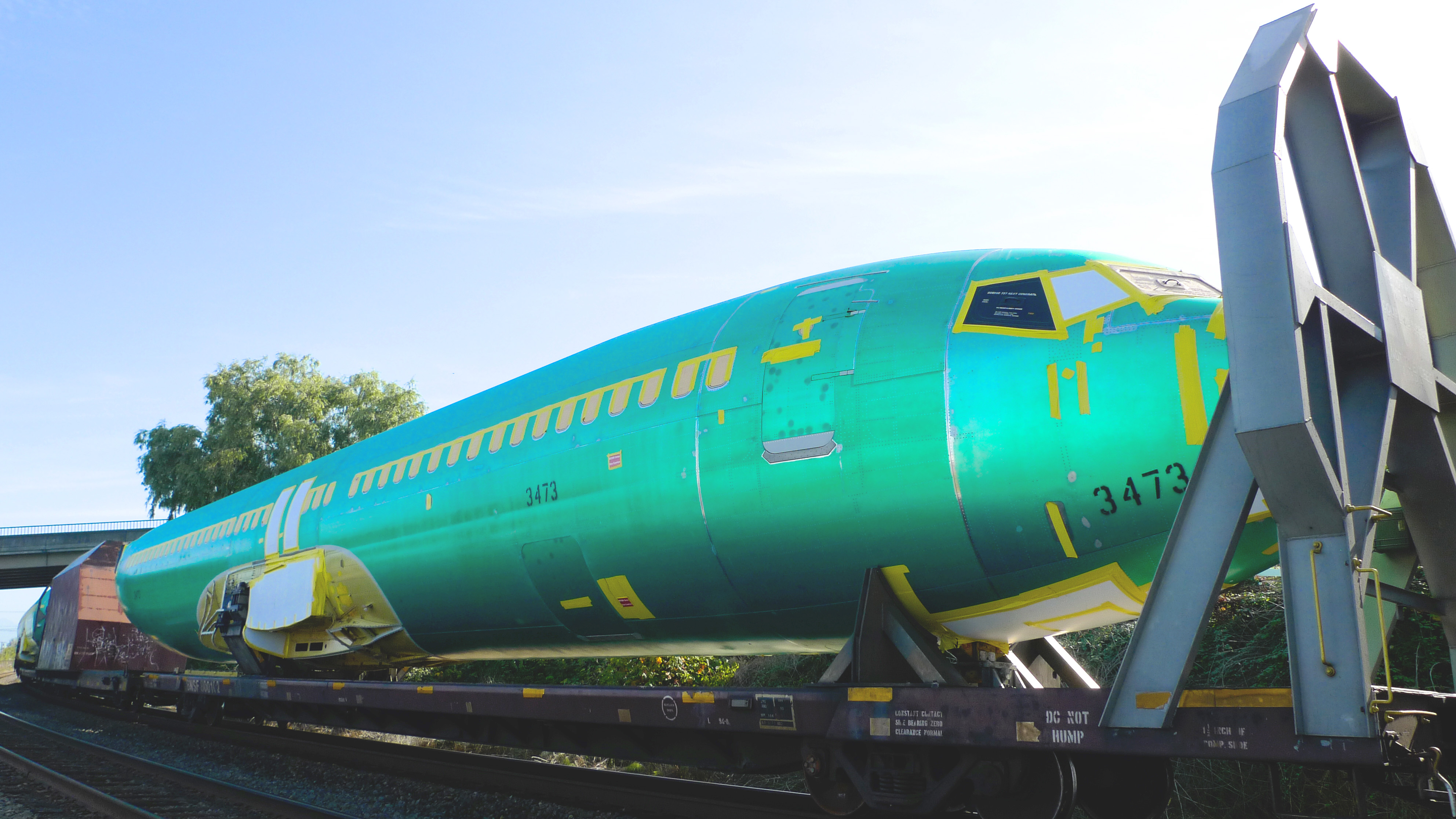
Boeing 737NG fuselage being transported by rail.

Aircraft parts were hauled via conventional freight cars beginning in World War II. However, given the ever-increasing size of aircraft assemblies, the "Sky Box" method of shipping parts was developed in the late 1960s specifically to transport parts for the Boeing 747 and other "jumbo" jets of the time. The "Sky Box" consists of a two-piece metal shell that is placed atop a standard flatcar to support and protect wing and tail assemblies and fuselage sections in transit (originally, depressed-center or "fish belly" cars were utilized).

Boeing 737 aircraft fuselages constructed by Spirit Aerosystems in Wichita, Kansas are hauled as special loads to the Boeing Renton Factory for final assembly.

=== Bulkhead flatcars ===
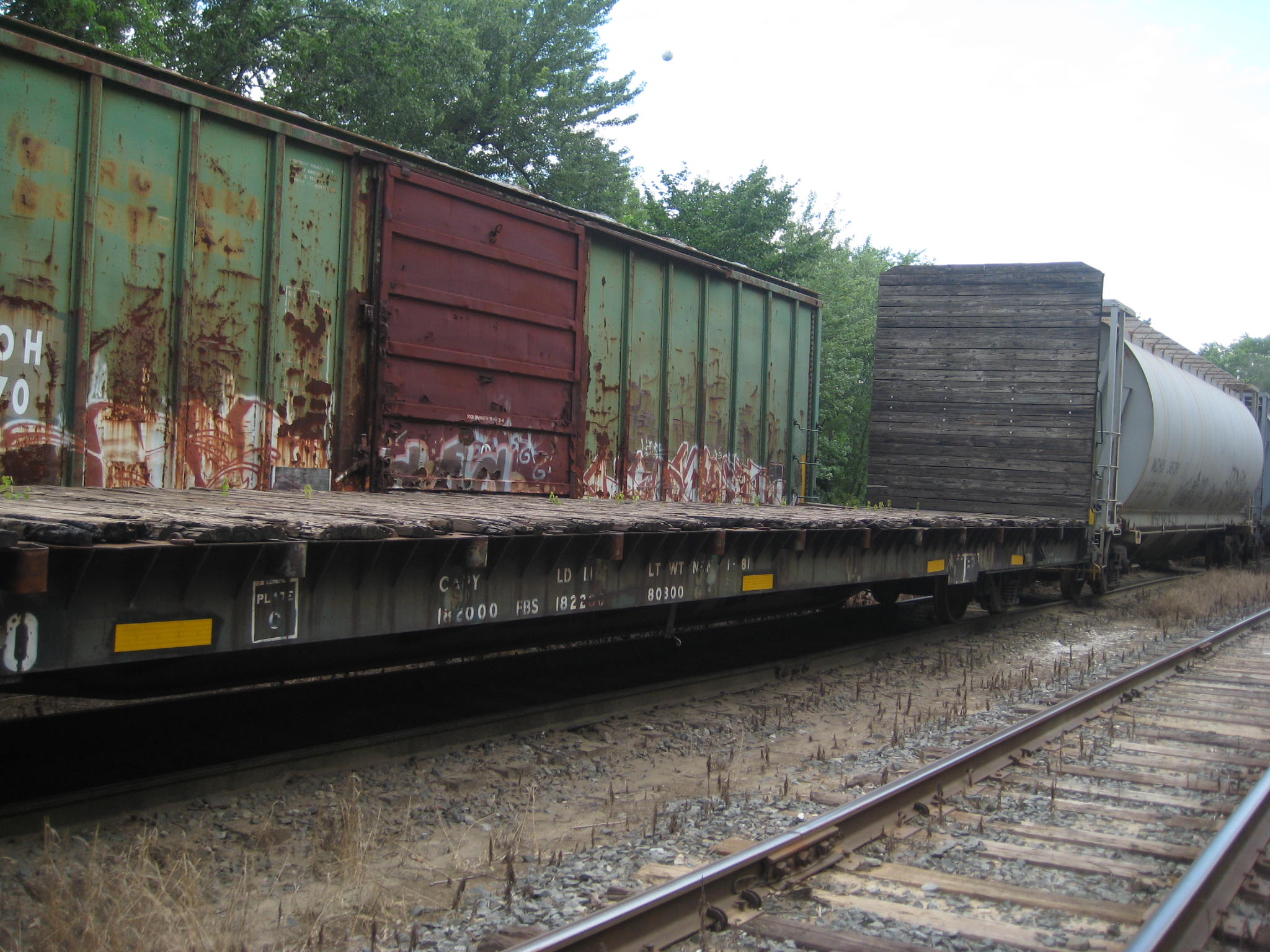
Worn ICE stakesided bulkhead flatcar in the RBMN Duryea yard in July 2012

Bulkhead flatcars are designed with sturdy end-walls (bulkheads) to prevent loads from shifting past the ends of the car. Loads typically carried are pipe, steel slabs, utility poles and lumber, though lumber and utility poles are increasingly being hauled by skeleton cars. Bulkheads are typically lightweight when empty. An empty bulkhead on a train puts it at a speed restriction to go no more than 50 mph (80 km/h). Since bulkheads are lightweight when empty, hunting can occur when the car is above 50 mph (80 km/h). Hunting is the wobbling movement of the trucks on a freight car or a locomotive. If the wheels hunt against the rails for a period of time, there is a high risk of a derailment.

=== Centerbeam flatcars/lumber racks ===
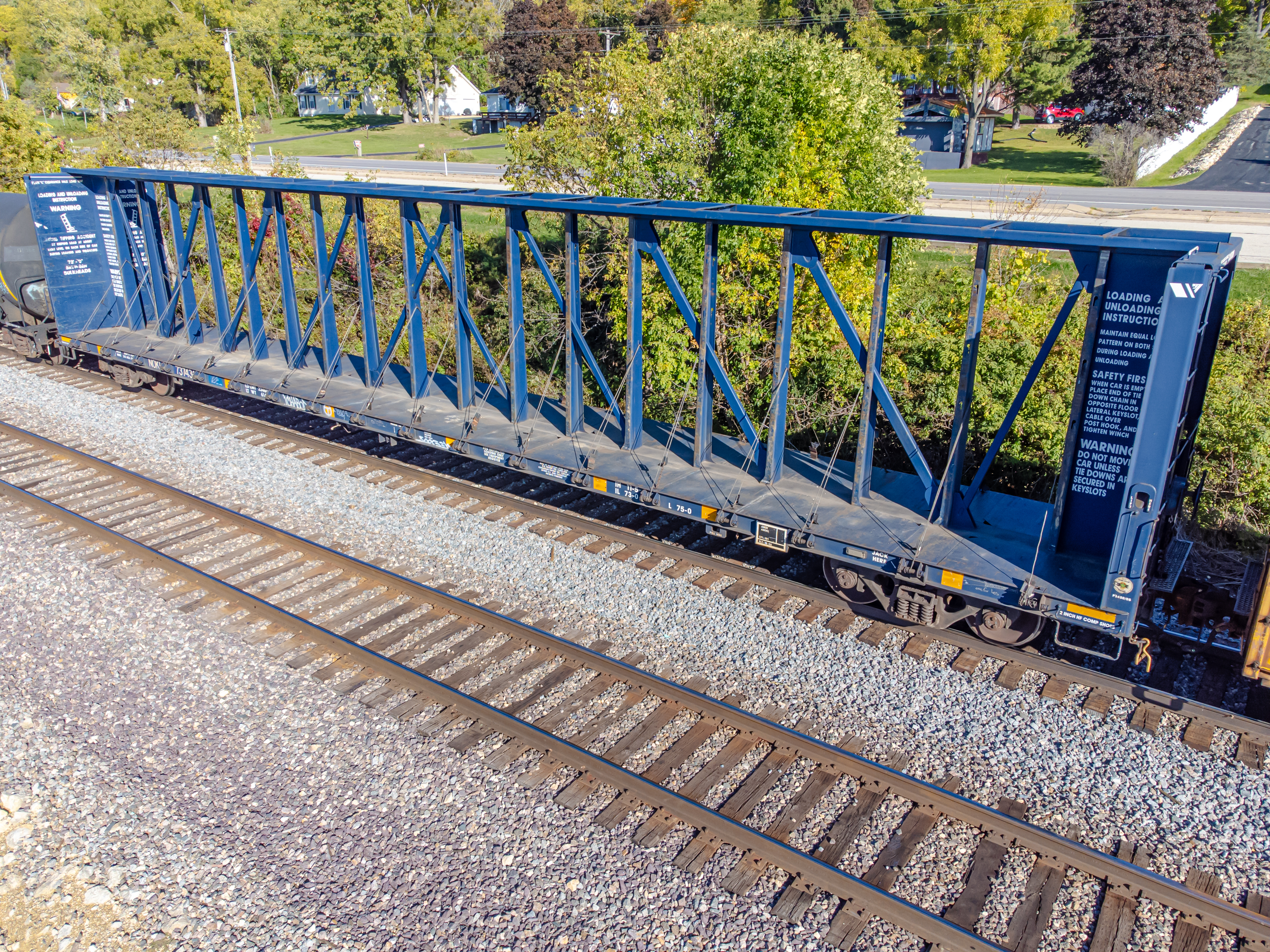
Steel strapping

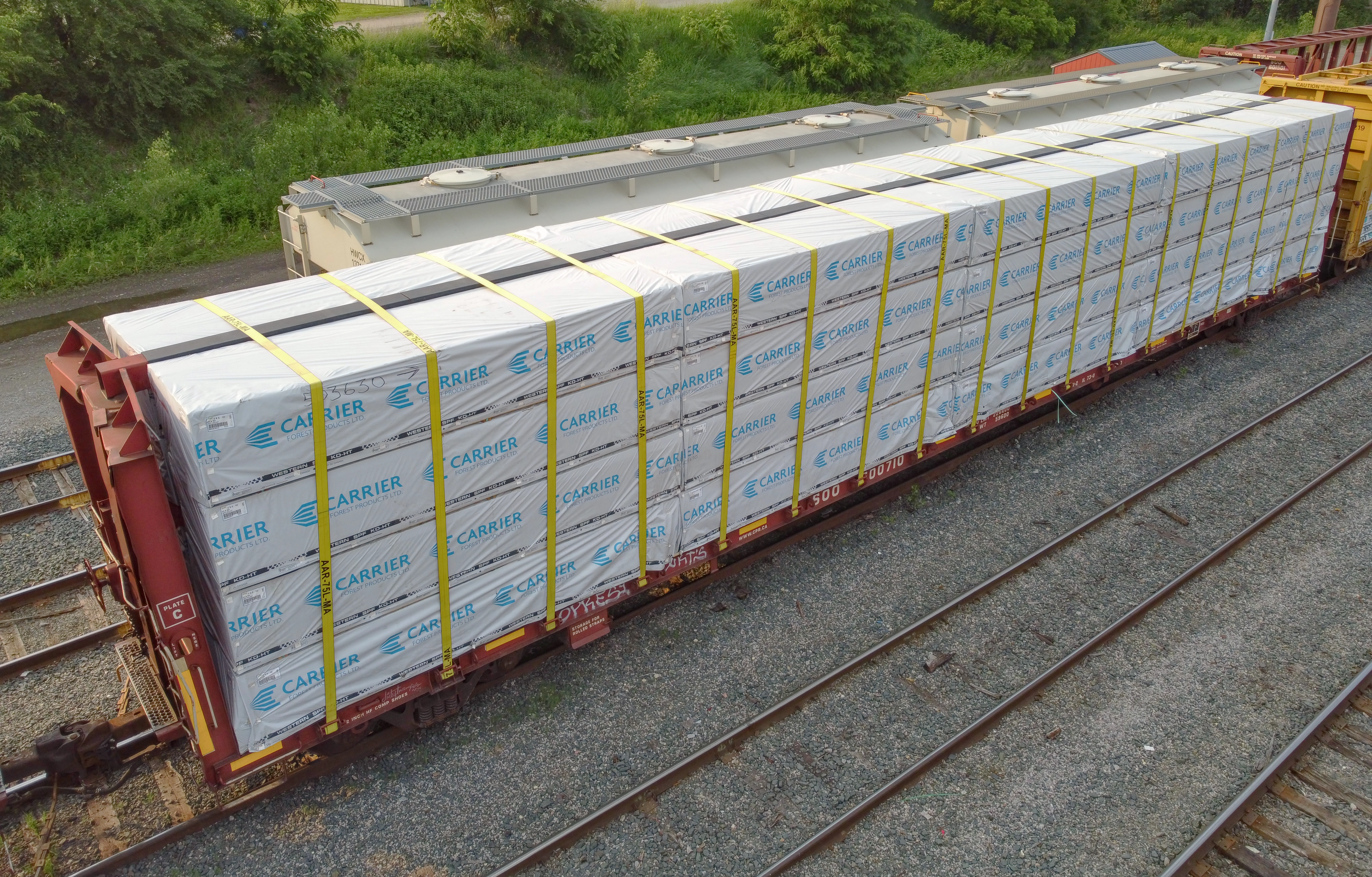
Polyester rolled strapping

Centerbeam flatcars / lumber racks

Centerbeam flatcars, centerbeams, center partition railcar, or "lumber racks" are specialty cars designed for carrying bundled building supplies such as dimensional lumber, wallboard, and fence posts. They are essentially bulkhead flatcars that have been reinforced by a longitudinal I-beam, often in the form of a Vierendeel truss, sometimes reinforced by diagonal members, but originally in the form of stressed panels perforated by panel-lightening "opera windows", either oval-shaped (seen above) or egg-shaped. These flatcars must be loaded symmetrically, with half of the payload on one side of the centerbeam and half on the other, to avoid tipping over.

=== Heavy capacity flatcars ===
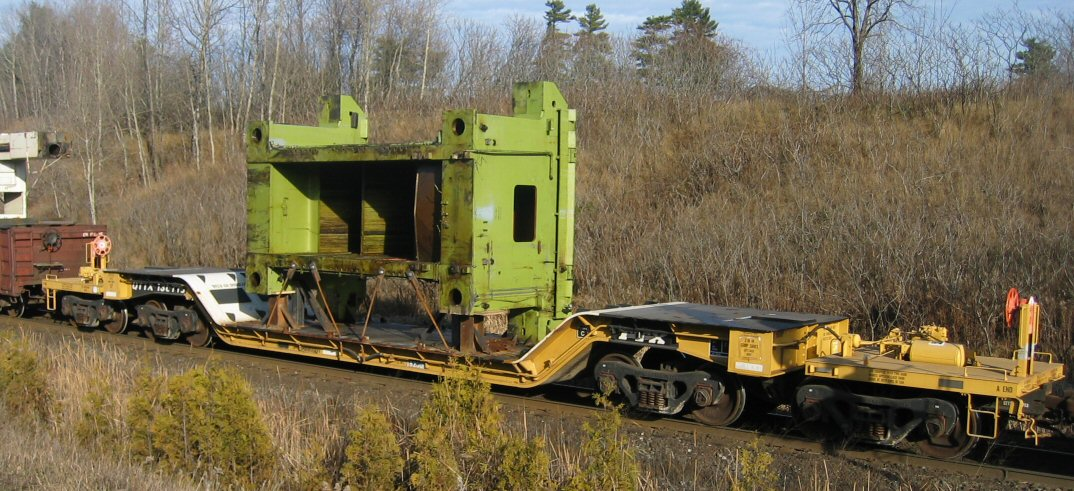
A heavy duty flatcar with load in Ontario in 2004

Heavy capacity flatcars are cars designed to carry more than 100 short tons (90.72 t; 89.29 long tons). They often have more than the typical North American standard of four axles (one two-axle truck at each end), and may have a depressed center to handle excess-height loads as well as two trucks of three axles each (one at each end) or four trucks (two at each end) of two axles each, connected by span bolsters. Loads typically handled for the heavy capacity flatcars include electrical power equipment and large industrial production machinery.

=== Circus use ===
A circus train is a modern method of conveyance for circus troupes. One of the larger users of circus trains was the Ringling Bros. and Barnum & Bailey Circus (RBBX), a famous American circus formed when the Ringling Brothers Circus purchased the Barnum and Bailey Circus in 1907, merged in 1919, and closed permanently as a merged company in May 2017.

=== Remote control use ===
Some companies, such as CSX Transportation, have former wood-carrying flatcars rebuilt into platforms which mount remote control equipment for use in operating locomotives. Such platforms are fitted with appropriate headlights, horns, and air brake appliances to operate in the leading position on a cut of cars (i.e. coupled ahead of the locomotive).

=== Intermodal freight use ===
COFC (container on flat car) cars are typically 89 feet (27.13 m) long and carry four 20-foot (6.10 m) intermodal containers or two 40-foot (12.19 m)/45-foot (13.72 m) shipping containers (the two 45-foot or 13.72-metre containers are carryable due to the fact that the car is actually 92 ft or 28.04 m long, over the strike plates). With the rise of intermodal-freight-transport–specific cars, and given the age of most of these flats, numbers will decline over the next several years. Indeed, when the first well cars appeared, allowing double stacking, many container flats were re-built as autoracks. The few "new build" container flats are identifiable by their lack of decking, welded steel frame, and standard 89-foot (27.13 m) length. One variant is the 50-foot (15.24 m) car (which usually carries one large container as a load); these are actually re-built old boxcars. Common reporting marks are FEC, CP, SOO and KTTX. The ATTX cars, which feature non-sparking grips and sides, are built for hauling dangerous goods (ammunition, flammable fluids, etc.).

Containers on flatcar

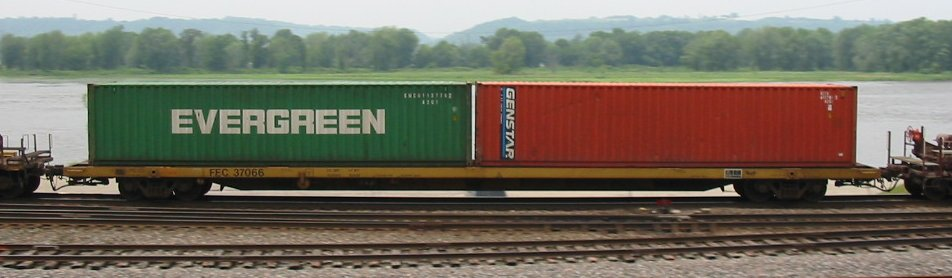
A Florida East Coast Railway flatcar carries two shipping containers as it passes through Glen Haven, Wisconsin.

==== Spine car ====
A spine car is a car with only center and side sills and lateral arms to support intermodal containers.

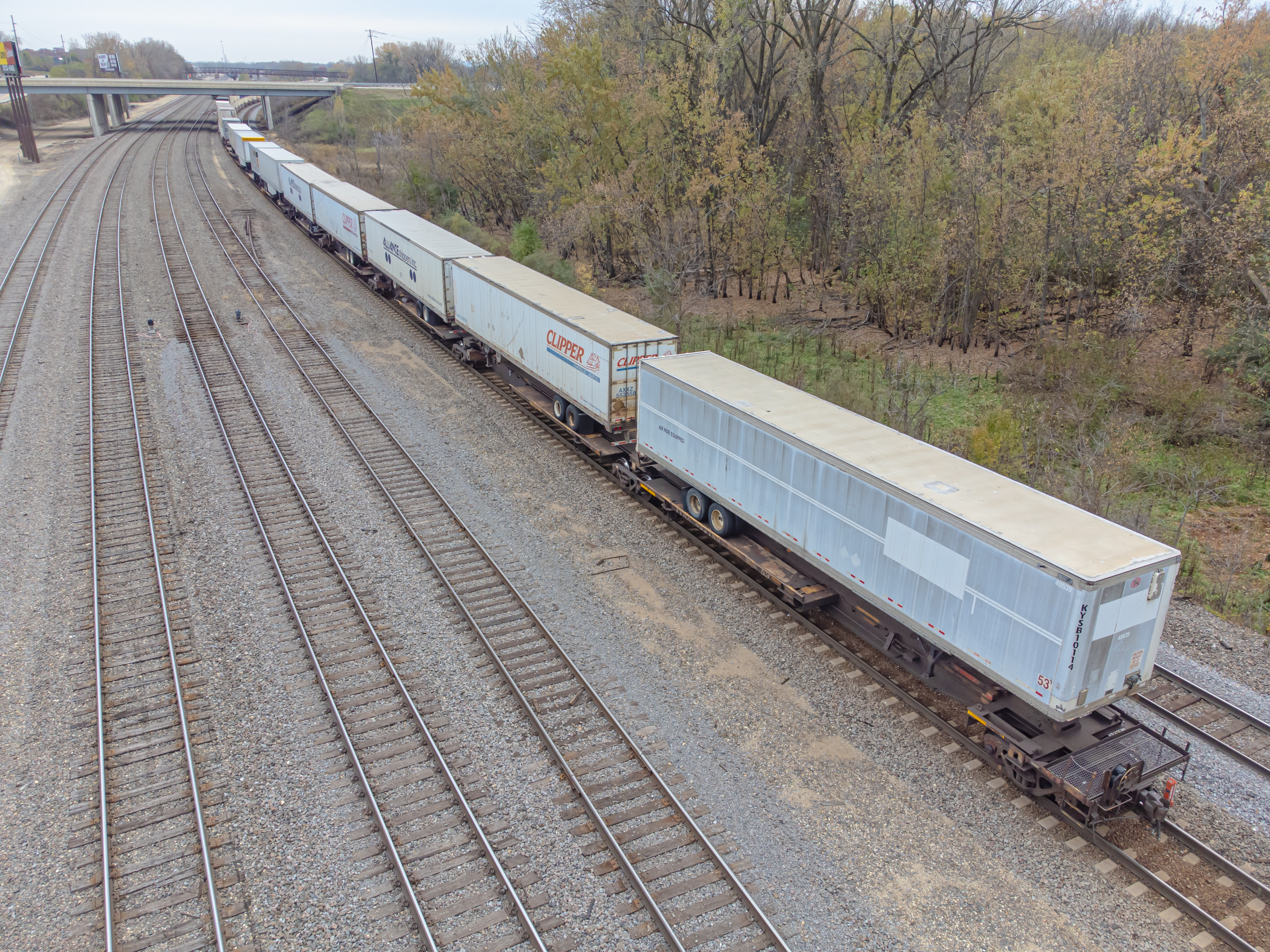
Spine cars with semi trailers on them

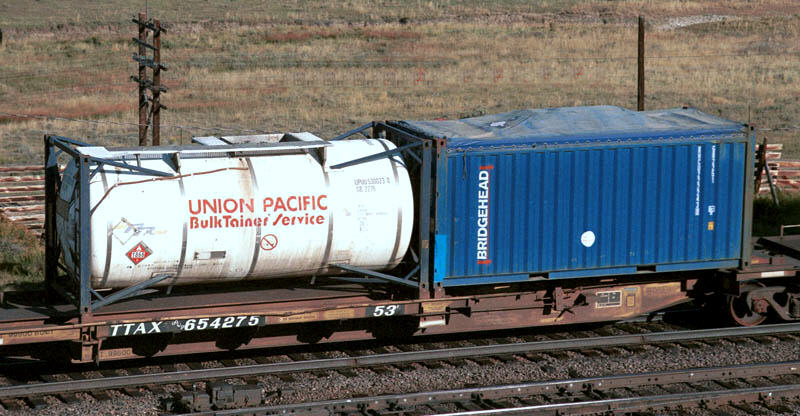
A spine car with a 20 ft tanktainer and an open-top 20 ft container with canvas cover.

==== Trailer-on-flat car ====
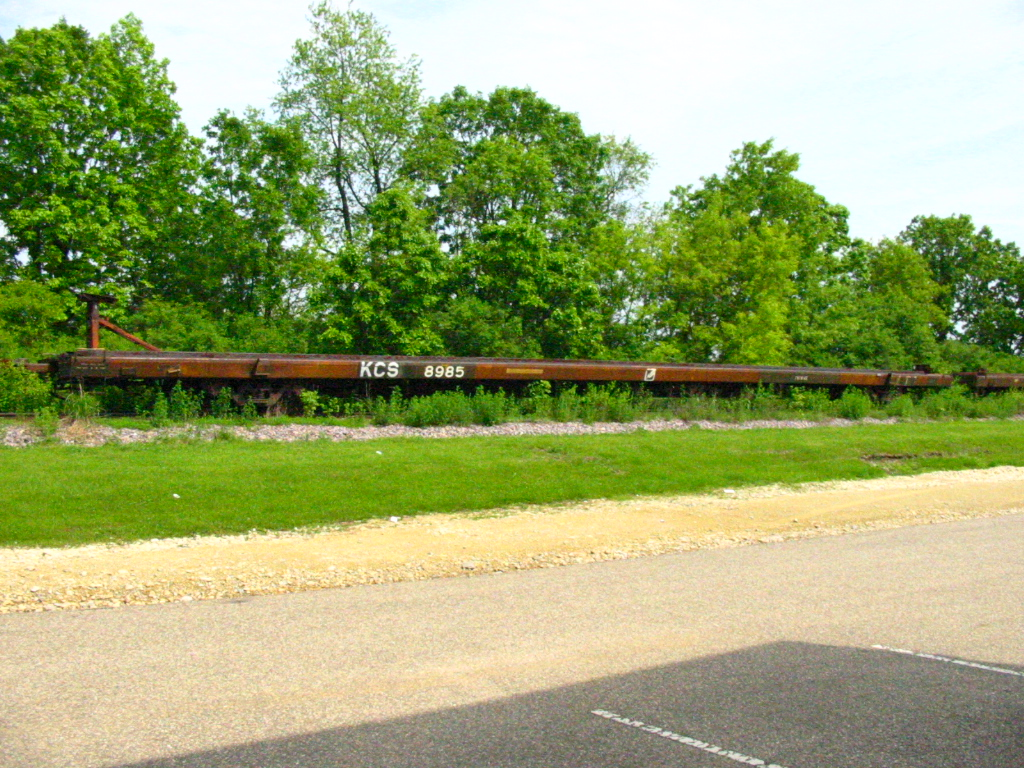
This Kansas City Southern Railway flatcar is fitted with fifth wheel couplings for hauling trailers. (2004)

A Trailer-on-flat-car, or piggy-back car allows two 28.5-foot (8.69 m) trailer pups or one semi-trailer up to 57 feet (17.37 m) to be carried. Like well cars, these usually come in articulated sets of five or three.

A longer TOFC (trailer on flat car) is usually an 89 ft (27.13 m) car. In the past, these carried three 30 ft (9.14 m) trailers which are, as of 2007, almost obsolete, or one large, 53 ft (16.15 m), two 40-foot (12.19 m) or 45-foot (13.72 m) trailers. As intermodal traffic grows, these dedicated flats are in decline. Most have been modified to also carry containers as well. One notable type is Canadian Pacific Railway's XTRX service—dedicated five-unit flats that only carry trailers.

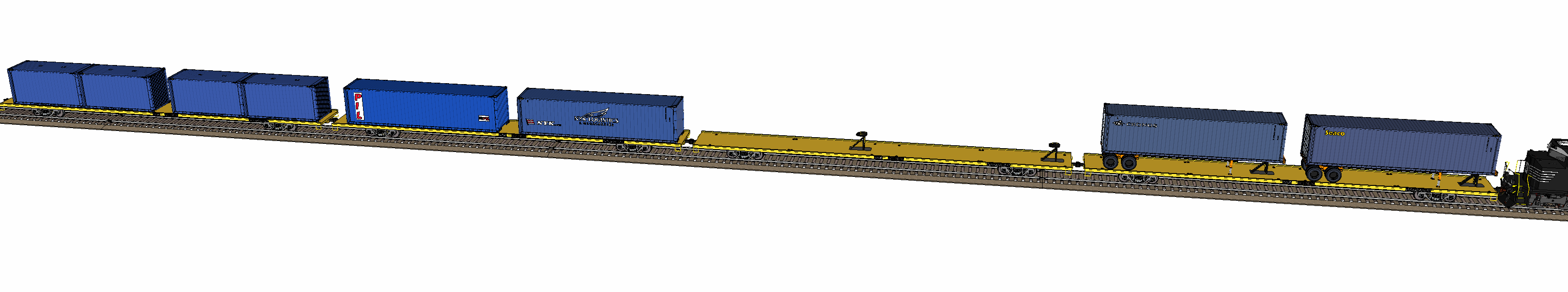
Four 89-foot (27.13 m) long intermodal flatcars Piggyback 2 forty-foot containers can fit on each 89-foot flat car 4 twenty-foot containers can fit on each flatcar one semi-trailer truck can fit as well

=== Skeleton car ===
Similar to the spine car except that it is designed to carry lumber or utility poles, a skeleton car is composed of a center sill and lateral arms only. No deck, sometimes no side sills and sometimes no end sills. The arms can include pockets for side stakes or tie-down points to secure loads.

=== Idler flatcars ===
In some marine services, the linkspan between a ferry or barge and its dock is very weak. In order to avoid loss of cargo or heavy locomotives, an old flatcar (which is usually the lightest car available) is used as a bridge between the locomotive on the dock and the cars on the ferry or barge.

Idler flatcars are also used in oversize freight service, as loads such as pipe often overhang the ends of most standard-sized flatcars. Empty flatcars will be placed on both ends of the loaded car. This protects the cargo ends from damage and ensures that the loads don't bind and damage the ends of adjacent cars.

Often a flat car is placed directly in front of a crane ("big hook") in order to:

- provide a way to remove a wrecked car from a crash site.
- provide a way to store new or removed rail from a work site.
- allow room for the crane's boom while in transit to and from a work site.

Idler flatcars are also used to mount one kind of coupler on one end and another kind on the other end (dual coupling). This is called a match wagon or a barrier vehicle.

== Gallery ==
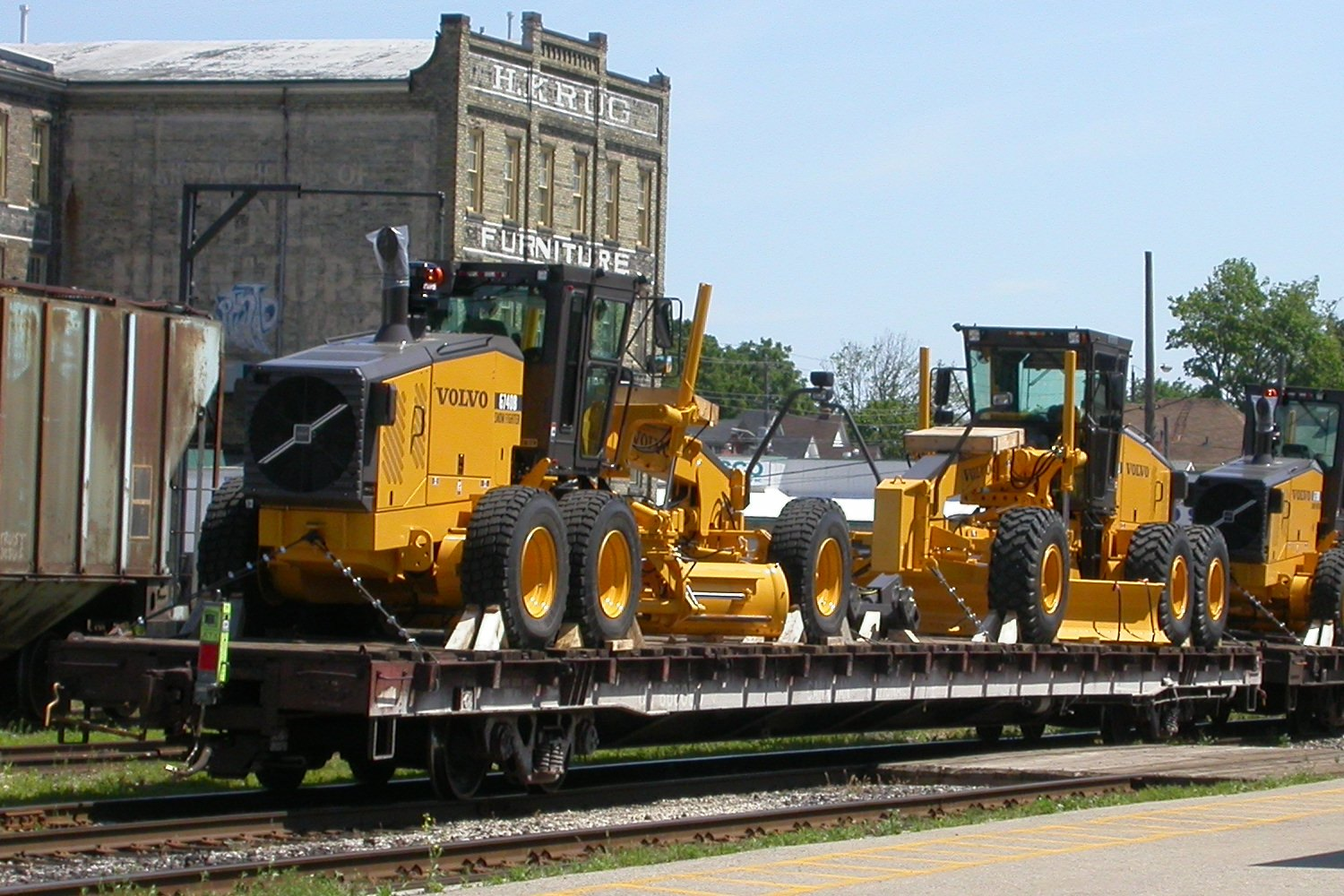
CN flatcar with newly built Volvo graders on the Goderich–Exeter Railway.

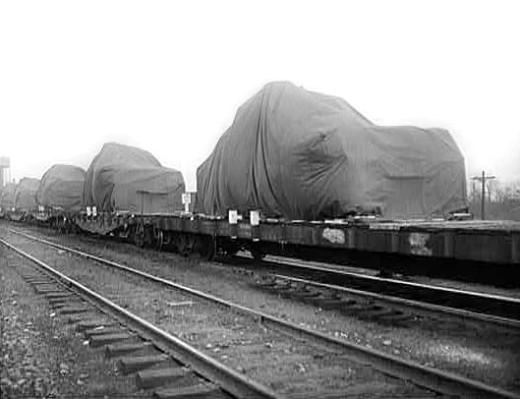
A string of flatcars carries tanks (under tarps) in April 1943. Photograph by Arthur Siegel.

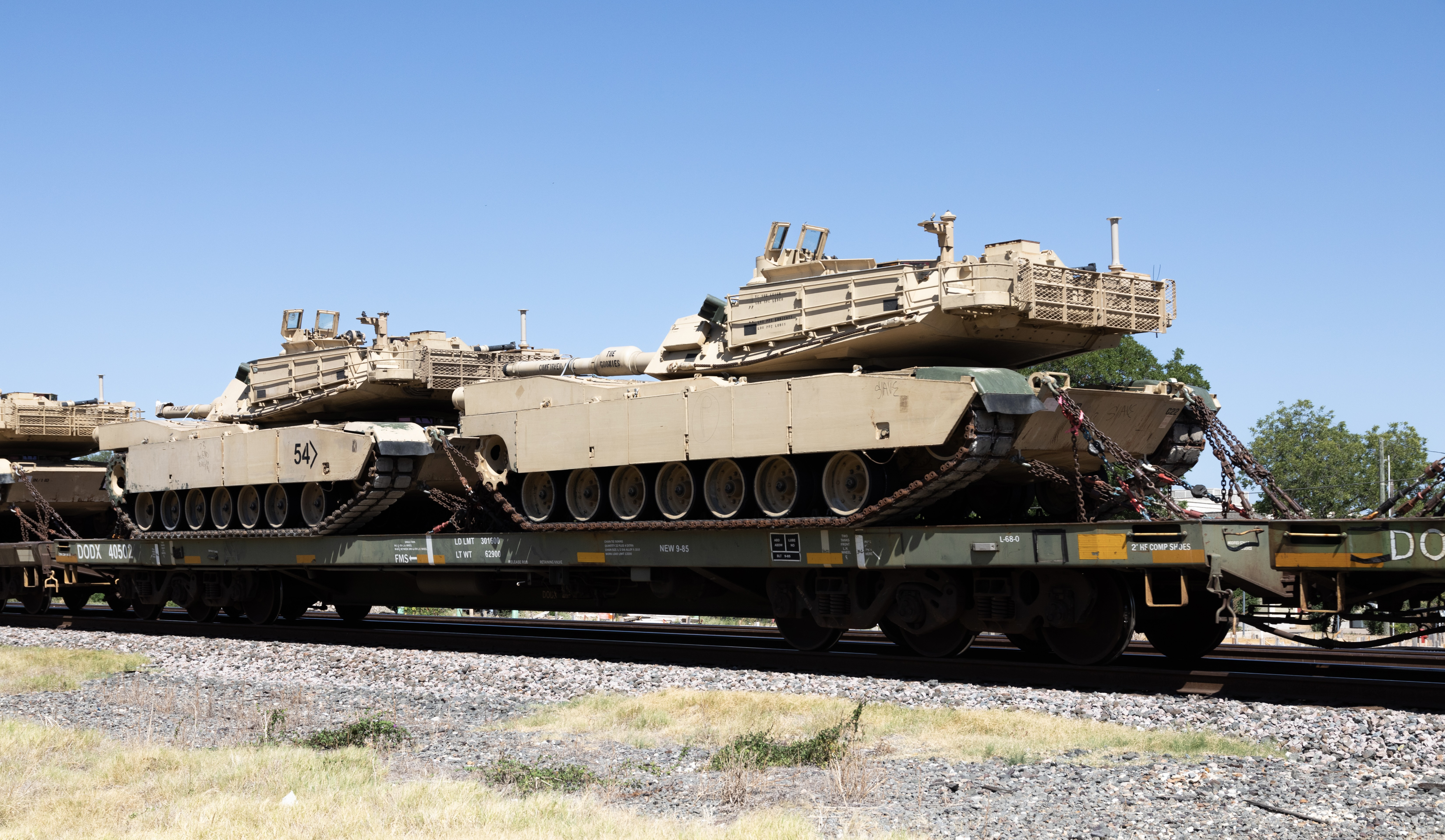
A flatcar loaded with M1 Abrams tanks

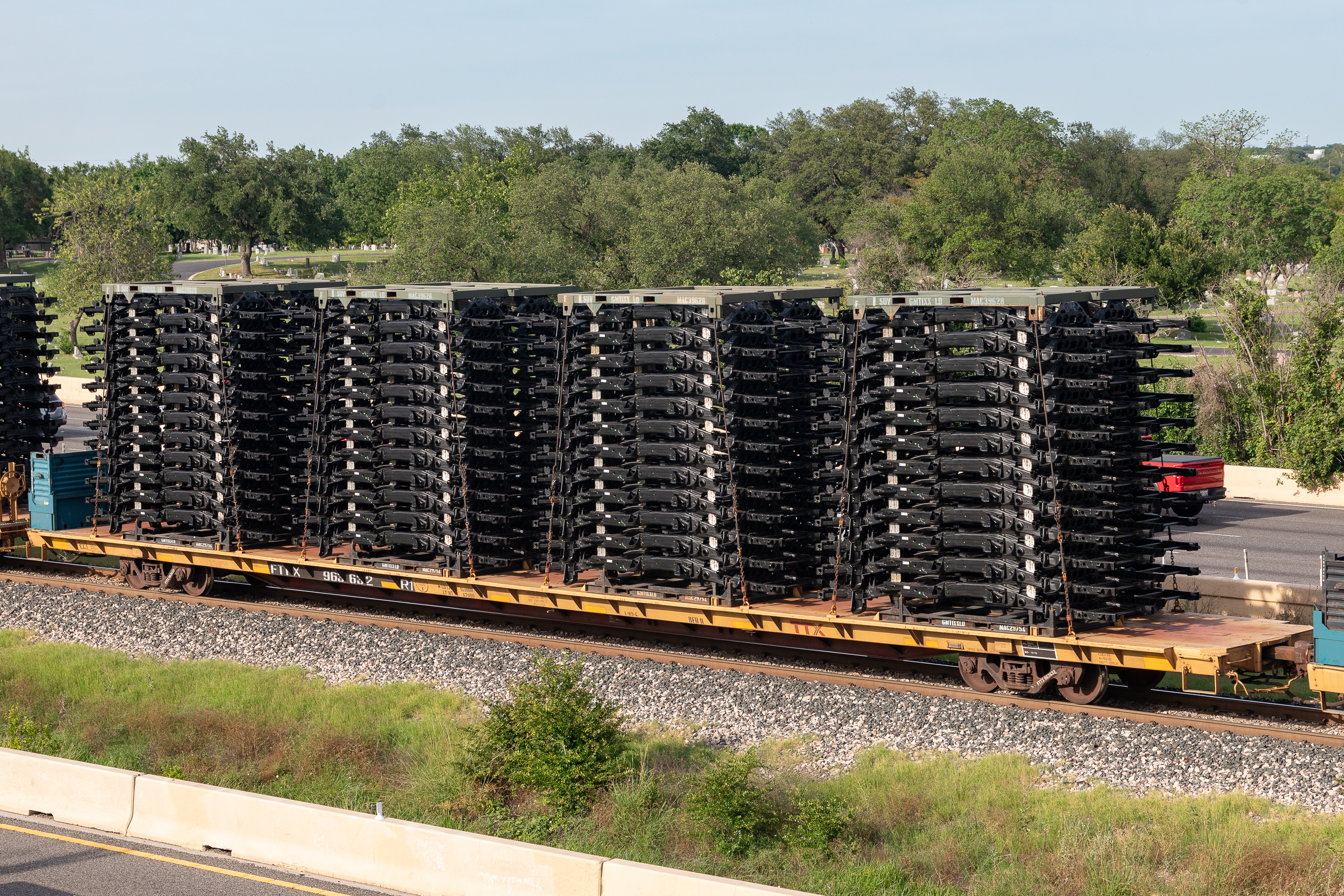
A flatcar loaded with automobile frames

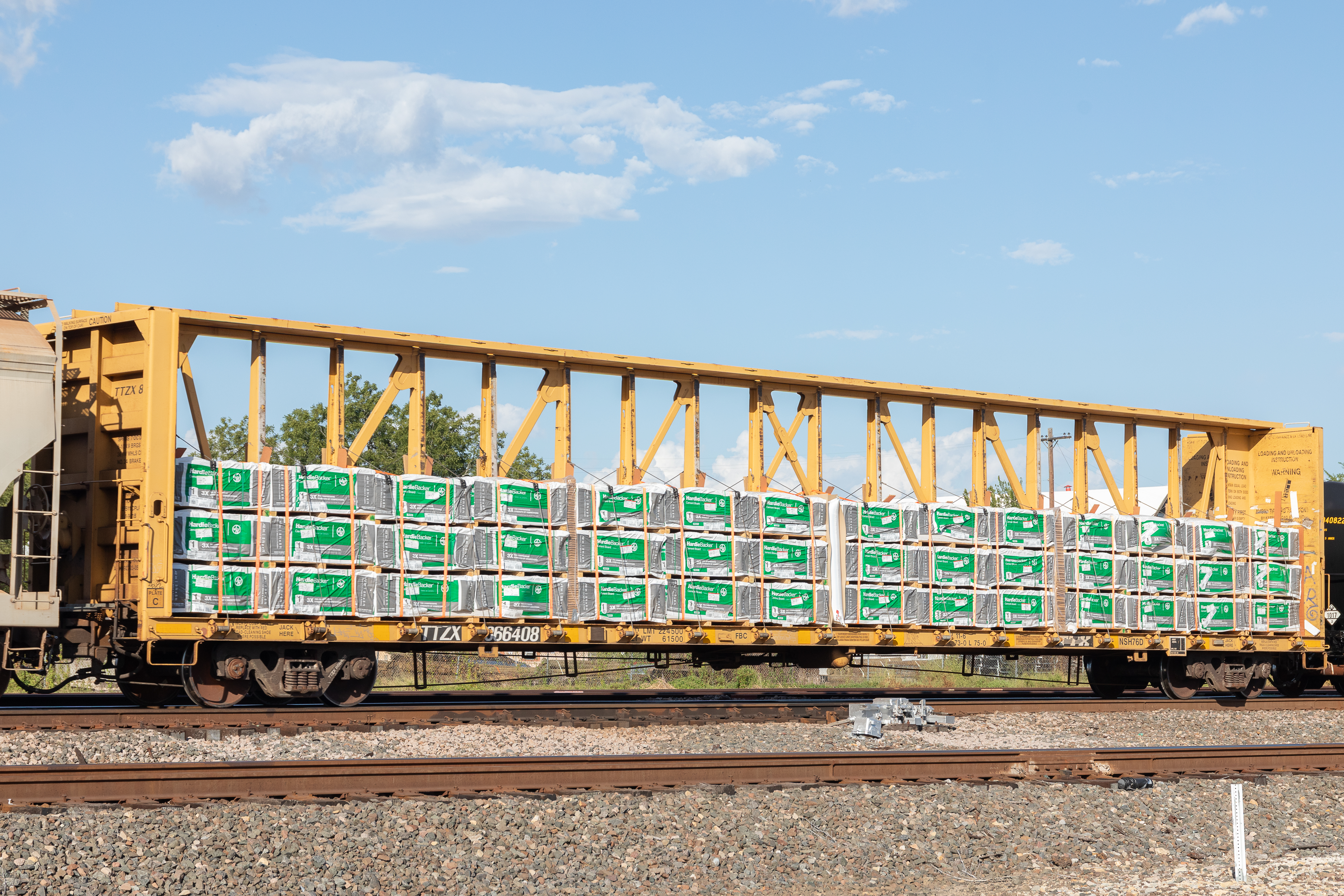
A center beam flatcar partially loaded with lumber

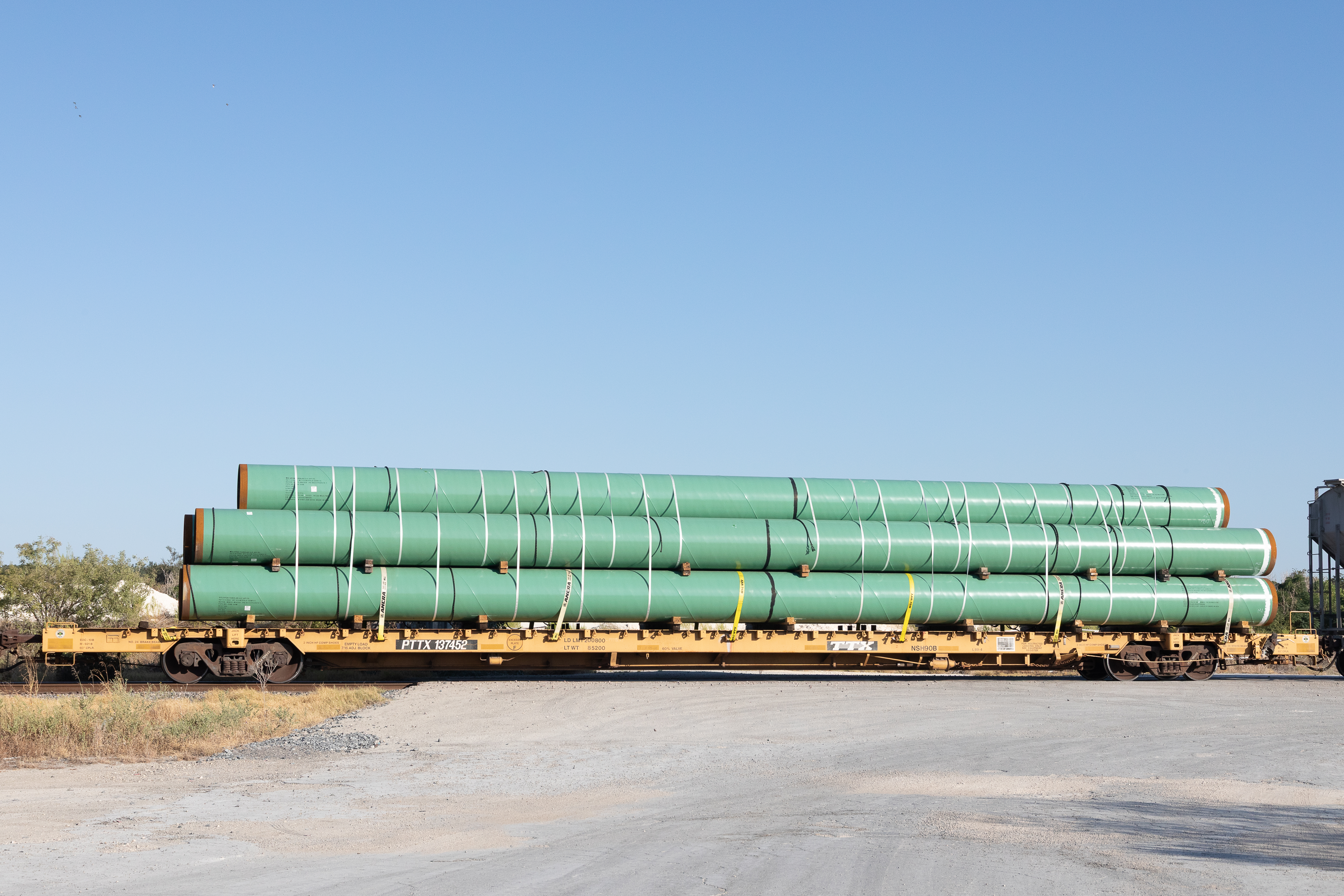
A flatcar loaded with pipes

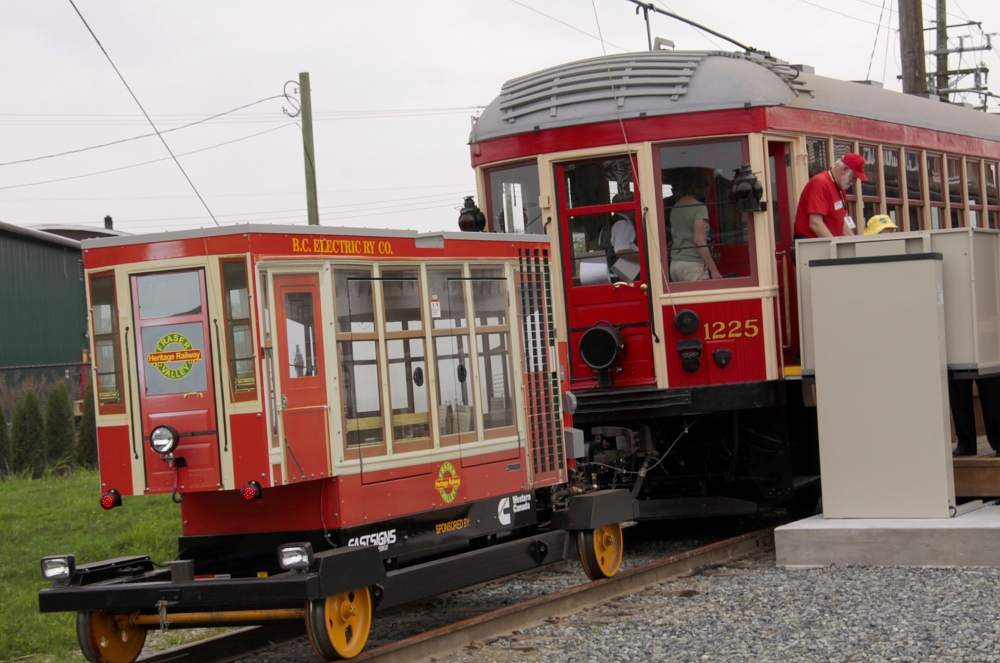
The Fraser Valley Heritage Railway Society single vehicle does not use a trolley-pole, instead it is powered by a generator towed on a small flatcar.

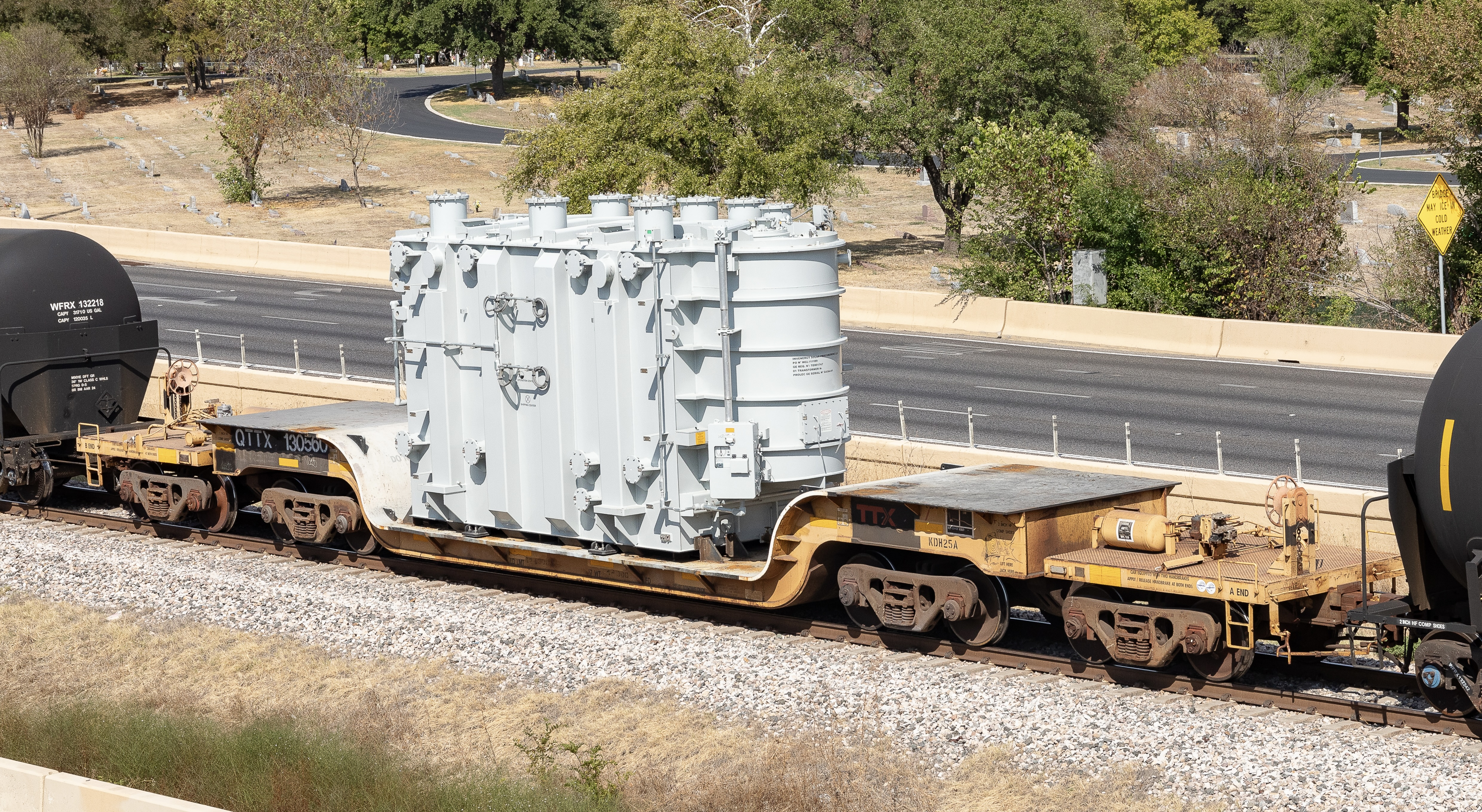
A "depressed center" flatcar loaded with a transformer

== See also ==
- Bogie bolster wagon
- Conflat
- Containerization
- Flatbed trolley
- Flatbed truck
- Intermodal container
- Load securing
- Rollbock
- Rolling highway
- Side stake
- Slate waggon
- Transporter flatcar
- Tie down strap
