= Fraser Valley Heritage Railway Society =

Nonprofit organization in Surrey, Canada

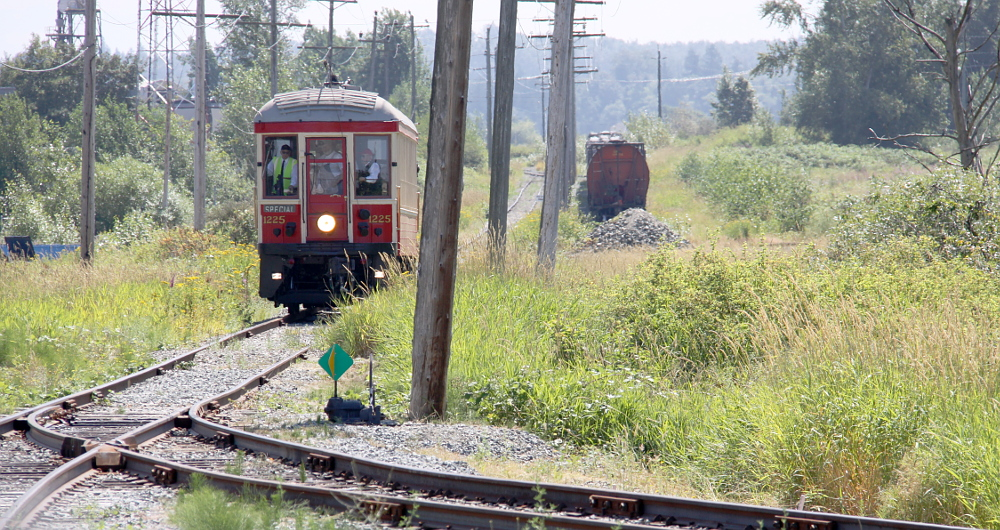

Overview
- Status: Operating
- Locale: Surrey, BC, Canada
- Stations: 2
- Website: https://fvhrs.org/

Service
- Type: Heritage streetcar, seasonal operation
- Rolling stock: Historic Interurban

History
- Opened: 15 March 2001

Technical
- Line length: 7.4 km (4.6 mi)
- Electrification: None; electricity supplied by portable diesel generator

The Fraser Valley Heritage Railway Society (FVHRS) is a non-profit organization that runs a historic railway in Surrey, British Columbia. The organization restores and operates historic interurban streetcars previously operated by the British Columbia Electric Railway (BCER), who ran streetcars and interurbans throughout southwestern British Columbia for 60 years. It is one of seven operating heritage railways in the province.

The organization runs seasonal service between two recreated train stations located along track originally a part of the BCER's Fraser Valley Interurban line. The Fraser Valley line opened in 1910 and ran from New Westminster to Chilliwack through Surrey. The line had track-length of 120-kilometre (75 mi), making it the longest interurban line ever constructed in Canada. The current line operated by the Society runs on 7.4 kilometres (4.6 mi) of original track, with plans to expand the line in the future.

== History ==
The FVHRS formed in 2001 under the advisory of the city of Surrey with a mission to acquire, restore, and operate BCER interurban cars. Its headquarters were established on the site of the original Sullivan Station in Surrey, which was part of the BCER's Fraser Valley Branch line. The line opened in 1910 and extended from Chilliwack to New Westminster, where passengers could transfer on to Vancouver. At 120-kilometre (75 mi) the line remains the longest interurban rail line constructed in Canada. A reproduction of the BCER Sullivan Station was constructed along the original tracks in 2001. This station was the base of operations and used to store rolling stock from 2001 until 2012.

In 2004, the BC Ministry of Transportation issued a grant to the FVHRS of $75,000 in order to purchase BCER interurban car number 1225. The city of Surrey matched this donation with an additional $75,000, with the purchase of the streetcar costing $300,000. The FVHRS agreed to purchase car 1225 from the Southern California Railroad Museum, who had bought the decommissioned car from the BCER in 1958. The car was transferred to Canada in 2005.

Car 1304, previously on display at the Oregon Electric Railway Museum, was brought back to Canada at the Sullivan Station in April, 2009.

The FVHRS relocated to the site of the old Cloverdale Station in 2013 after construction of a replica depot was completed in addition to a carbarn. The historic rail system began operation in June 2013 with seasonal return service from Cloverdale to Sullivan Station.

In 2016, the Edmonton Radial Railway Society donated the former Edmonton Transit Service #2001, a 1912 electric locomotive that once ran on the Oregon Electric Railway as well as the BCER. This locomotive was in turn donated to the Oregon Electric Railway Historical Society in 2017.

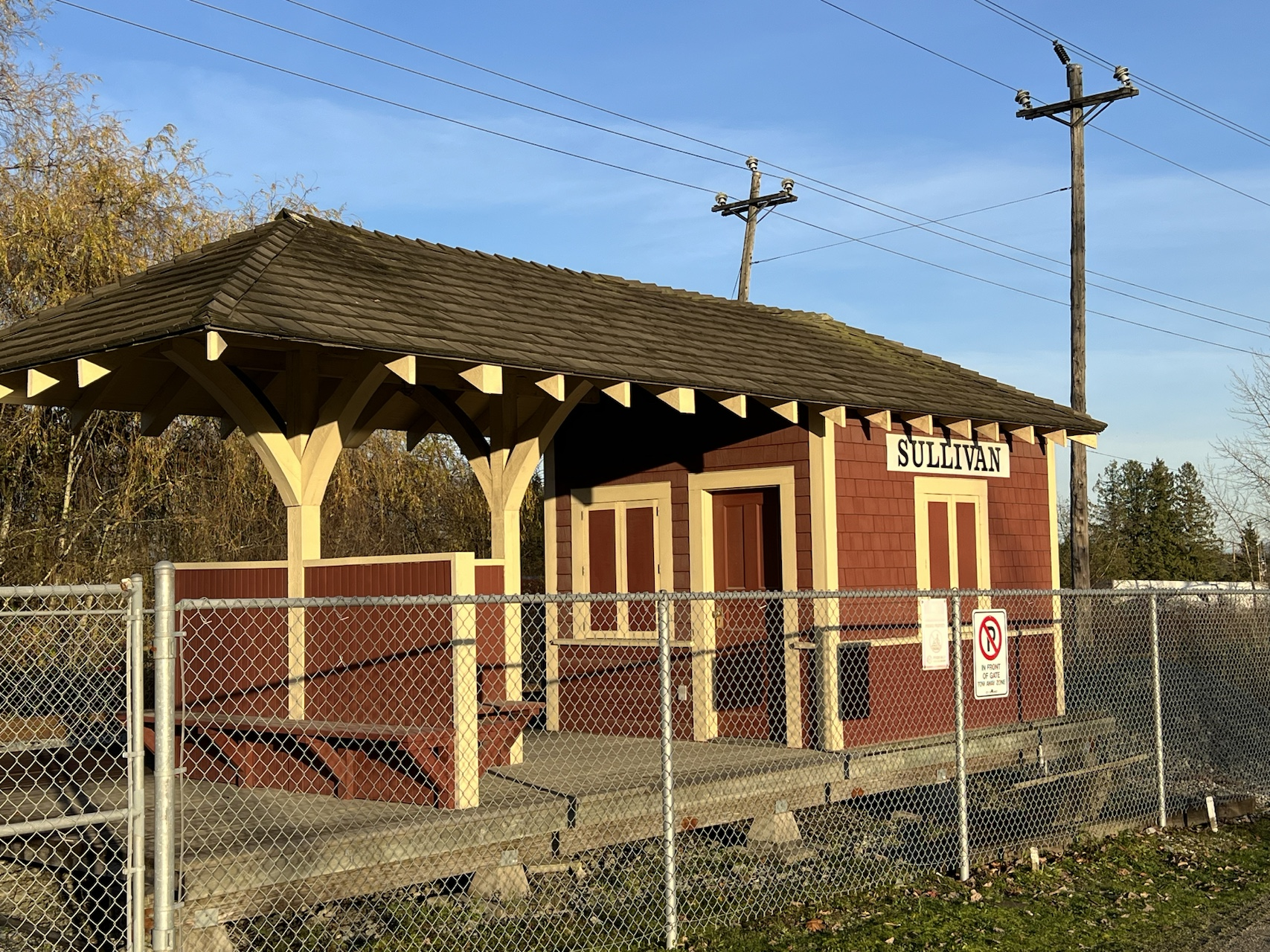
Sullivan Station, the first station replica created and former HQ of the FVHRS.

From 2013 to 2022, the FVHRS had an agreement with the city of Surrey to run the heritage line from Cloverdale to Sullivan. This agreement was not extended in 2023 and thus the Cloverdale to Sullivan excursion had to be cancelled for the 2023 season. In its stead, the FVHRS launched the new "Heritage Railway Adventure" where guests ride on a variety of the organizations rolling stock. In the new excursion, guests ride interurban car 1225 for 0.8 kilometres (0.50 mi), then take railroad speeders on a similar route. A video is then played about the history of the BCER on car 1207 and the tour ends with a ride on a velocipede.

In September 2024, an agreement was reached with Southern Railway of British Columbia (SRY) and BC Hydro to resume service for 5 years between the Cloverdale and Sullivan stations. Approval was required from the two organizations as SRY owns the freight rights on the old BCER track and BC Hydro owns the passenger rights. The restored line can be ridden as part of the 55-minute Sullivan Excursion. Also in 2024, the FVHRS began hosting free music performances at the Cloverdale Station through funding from the city of Surrey.

As 2026 marks the 25-year anniversary of operations for the FVHRS, the organization planned multiple events to celebrate. Plans are in place to run two BCER interurban cars linked together, cars 1225 and 1231. This would effectively double the passenger capacity for the system, which would be used on the Cloverdale to Sullivan line. As of the 2026 season, three of the organization's four interurban cars are fully operational, cars 1225, 1231, and 1304. Work to restore car 1207, the oldest car owned, are planned to be carried out by volunteers. The organization had the most volunteers to date in its 2026 season, with an average of 30 people onsite on the weekends. May 2026 also saw a 40% higher guest attendance compared to previous Mays.

== System ==
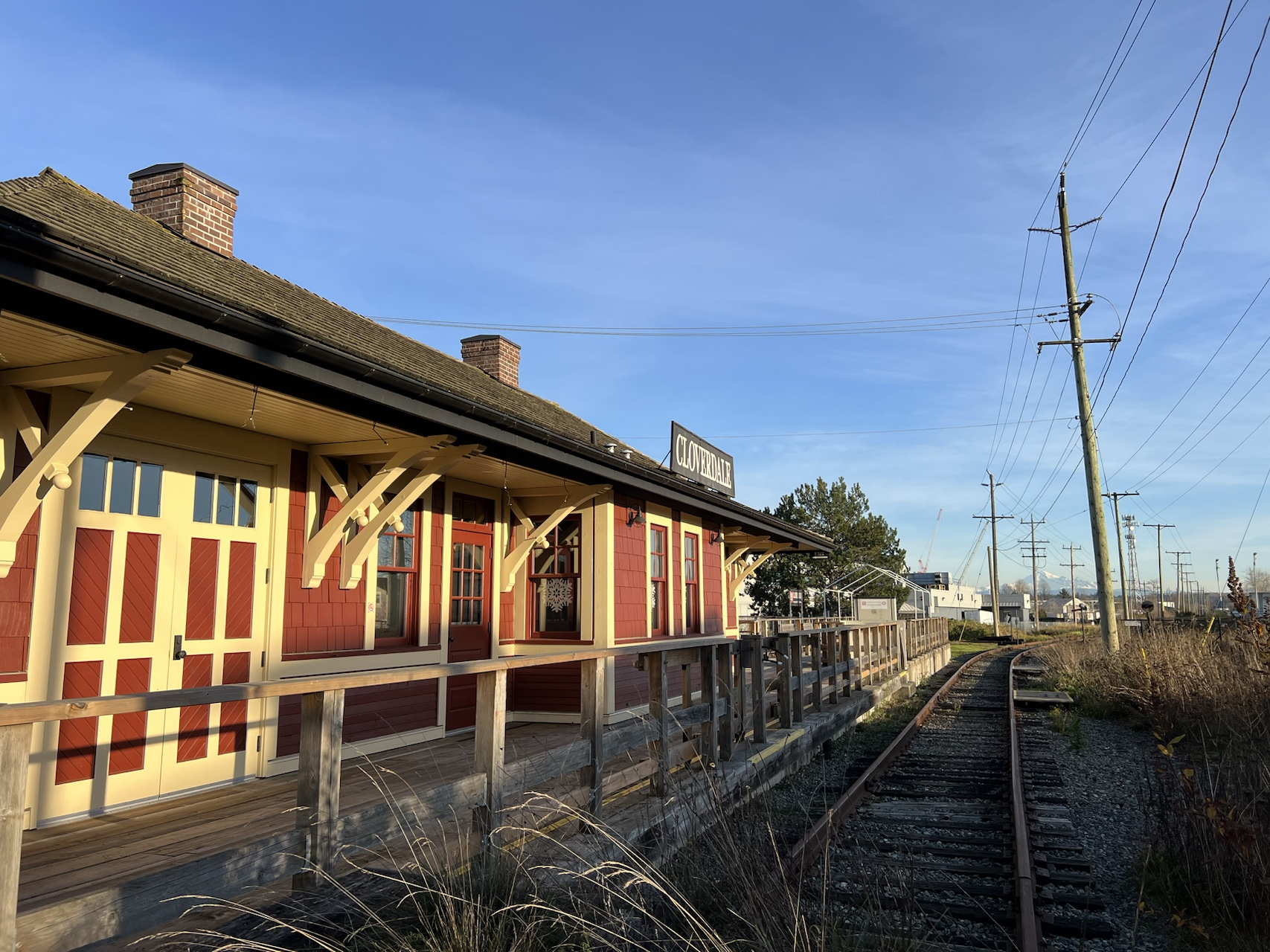
Cloverdale Station platform, the headquarters of the FVHRS.

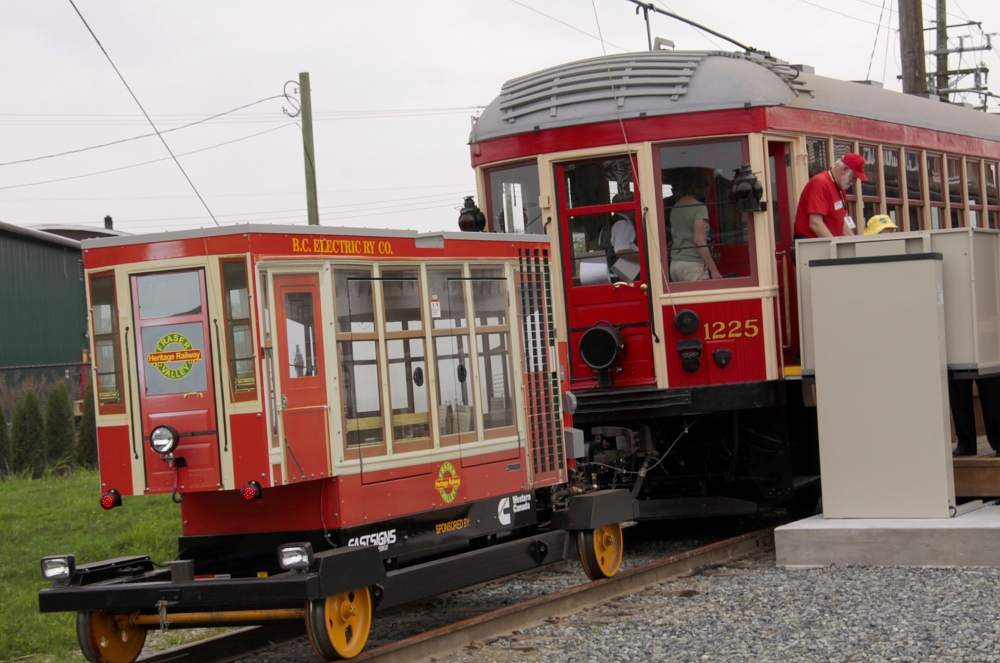
Interurban with its power generator.

The heritage line is 7.4 kilometres (4.6 mi) long, using only a small fraction of the original 120-kilometre (75 mi) interurban line of the BC Electric Railway that connected Vancouver to Chilliwack.

One of two operational interurbans is run seasonally on weekends, from stations at Cloverdale to Sullivan. The line's vehicles do not use a trolley-pole, and are instead powered by a Cummins diesel electric generator towed on a small flatcar.

The FVHRS aims to have a new spur line created at the Sullivan Station by mid-2026. The spur line will connect the station directly to the line, which will allow passengers to board and disembark at Sullivan Station. Following the creation of the new spur line, the FVHRS aims to expand the line further to Newton. This would involve the creation of a new replica Newton station, as well as upgrading the existing generators to compensate for the grade. FVHRS is also exploring the possibility of converting its trains to be hydrogen powered.

== Collection ==
Image	Date	Builder	Type	Operator	No.	Withdrawn	Service	Notes
BCER Interurban Streetcar No. 1225 at Fraser Valley Heritage Railway Society	1913	St. Louis Car Company	Interurban Streetcar	BCER	1225	1958	Lulu Island line (Marpole to Steveston) and Burnaby Lake line	Restored and operational. Runs from Cloverdale Station to Sullivan Station on weekends in the summer.
	1911	BCER	Interurban Streetcar	BCER	1304	1954	Fraser Valley line	Restored and operational. Nicknamed "The Connaught Car" as The Duke and Duchess of Connaught and Princess Patricia of Connaught rode it while on a royal visit to BC in 1912.
BCER Interurban Streetcar No. 1207 at Fraser Valley Heritage Railway Society	1905	BCER	Interurban Streetcar	BCER	1207	1958	Lulu Island line (Marpole to Steveston)	Car 1207 is ready to be restored as of July 2025. The restoration is estimated to take four to five years and cost $750,000. Currently used as the "1207 Theatre" where visitors board the car and watch a video about the BCER. Donated to FVHRS by the Downtown Historic Railway along with 1231.
BCER Interurban Streetcar No. 1231 at Fraser Valley Heritage Railway Society	1913	St. Louis Car Company	Interurban Streetcar	BCER	1231	1958	Lulu Island line (Marpole to Steveston) and Burnaby Lake line	Sister car of 1225. Restoration is ongoing. Donated to FVHRS by the Downtown Historic Railway along with 1207.
Honey Bee Express Railroad Speeders (Woodings speeder) at FVHRS			Railroad Speeder		FVR-11 FVR-12			Nicknamed the Woodlings speeder. Part of The Honey Bee Express.
The Honey Bee Express (Fairmont speeder) at FVHRS			Railroad Speeder		FVR2			Nicknamed the Fairmont speeder. Part of The Honey Bee Express.
		Volunteers	Handcar					Designed and built by volunteers, The Family Quad Car sits 4 people and is hand operated.
			Velocipede	CN	22128		Previously used in the Mt. Robson area.	Visitors can ride the Velocipede, which was restored by FVHRS.

== See also ==
- British Columbia Electric Railway
- Southern Railway of British Columbia, uses BCER tracks
