= 1996 United States House of Representatives elections =

House elections for the 105th U.S. Congress

- November 5, 1996

All 435 seats in the United States House of Representatives 218 seats needed for a majority
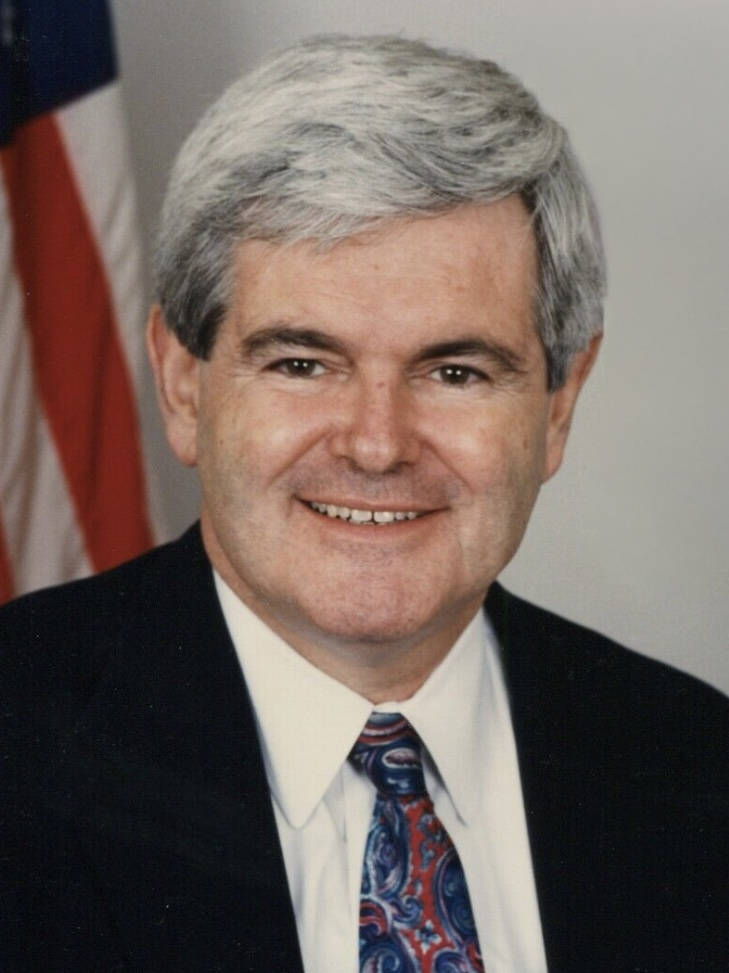

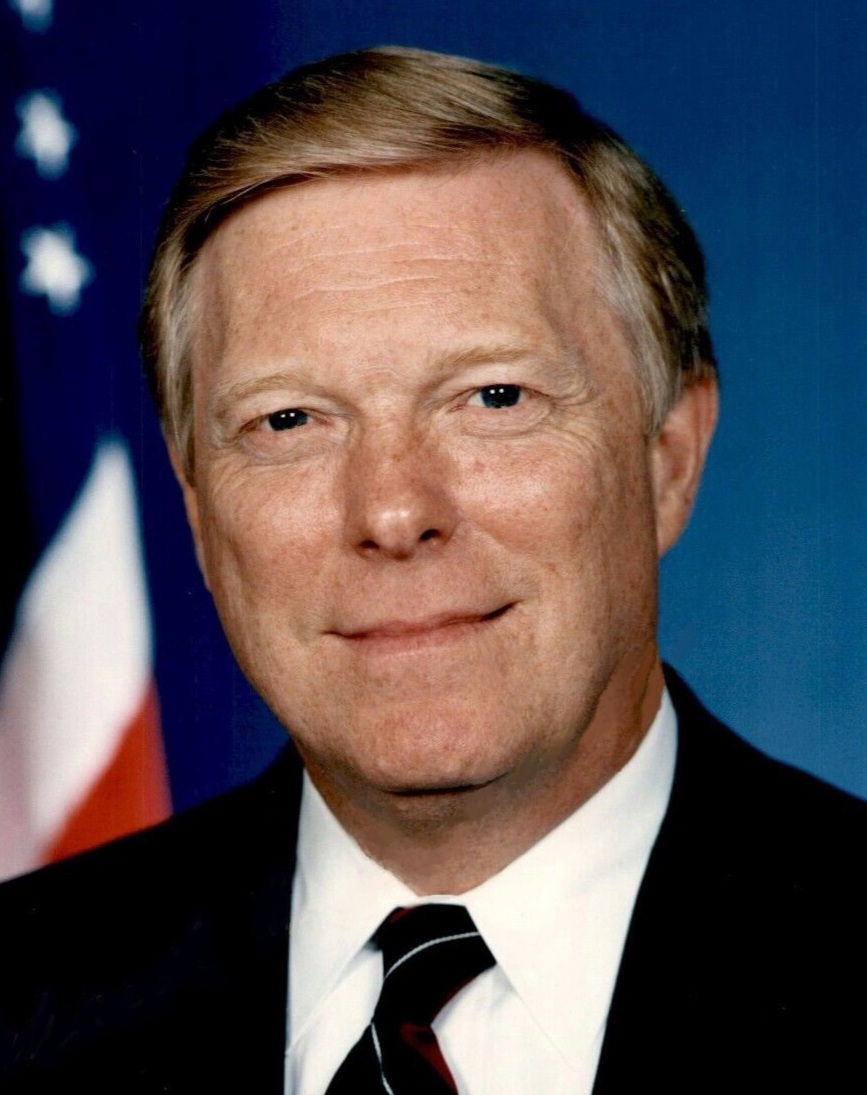
	Majority party	Minority party
Leader	Newt Gingrich	Dick Gephardt
Party	Republican	Democratic
Leader since	January 3, 1995	January 3, 1995
Leader's seat	Georgia 6th	Missouri 3rd
Last election	230 seats	204 seats
Seats won	226	207
Seat change	▼4	▲3
Popular vote	43,447,962	43,507,586
Percentage	48.15%	48.22%
Swing	▼3.7pp	▲3.4pp
	Third party
Party	Independent
Last election	1 seat
Seats won	2
Seat change	▲1
Popular vote	572,746
Percentage	0.6%
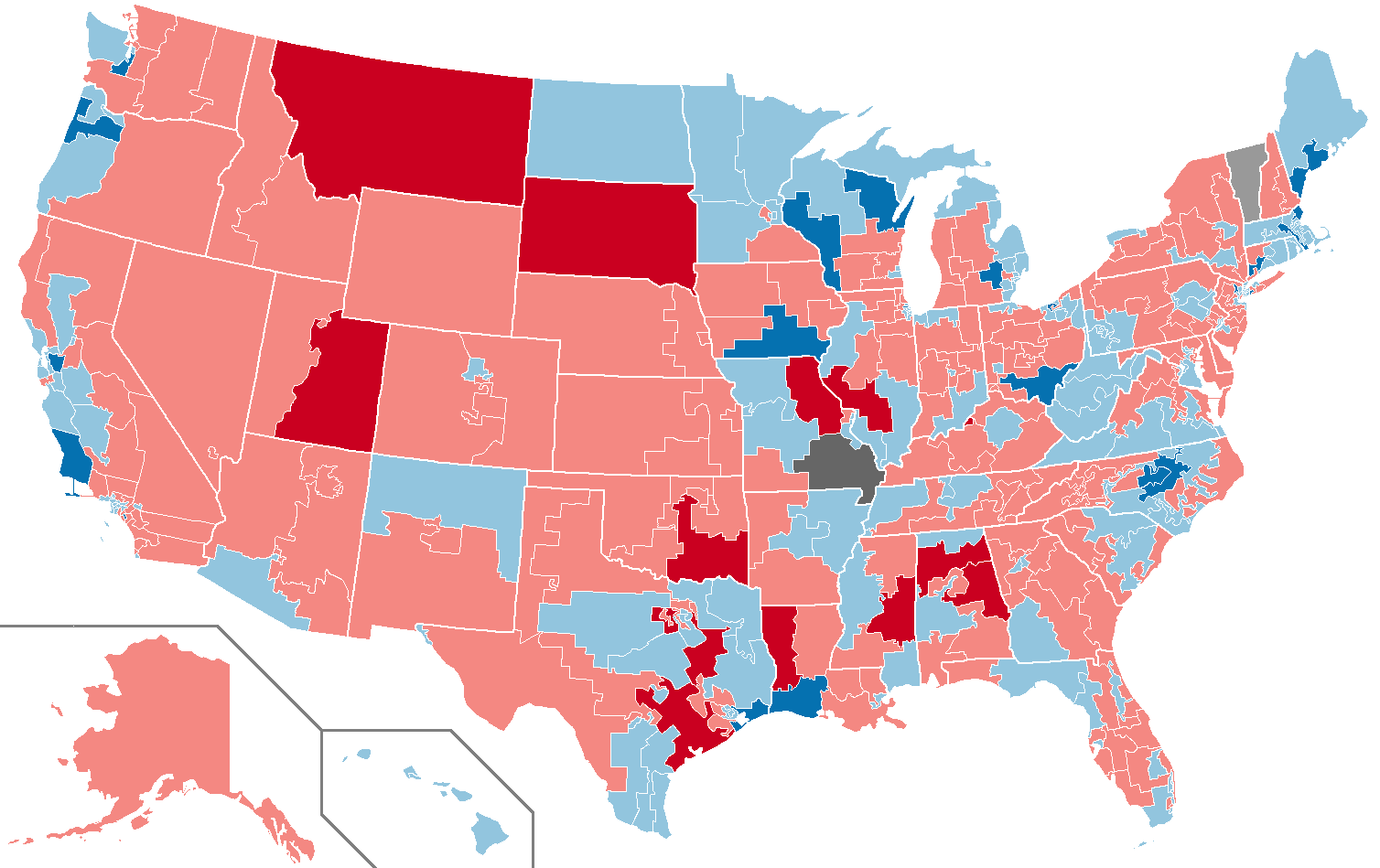
- Results: Democratic hold Democratic gain Republican hold Republican gain Independent hold Independent gain
Speaker before election
Newt Gingrich
Republican
Elected Speaker
Newt Gingrich
Republican

The 1996 United States House of Representatives elections were held for the United States House of Representatives on November 5, 1996, to elect members to serve in the 105th United States Congress. They coincided with the re-election of President Bill Clinton. Democrats won the popular vote by almost 60,000 votes (0.07%) and gained a net of two seats from the Republicans, but the Republicans retained an overall majority of seats in the House for the first time since 1928.

Although the Republicans lost three seats, one of them included an independent who would caucus with them and switch to the Republicans, resulting in a nine-seat Republican majority. A total of 12 freshman Republicans who were elected in the 1994 Republican Revolution were defeated in the election, while at least 36 were re-elected.

The election was the fourth and final time in the 20th century in which either party won the House majority without winning the popular vote, with the previous three instances occurring in 1914, 1942, and 1952. In terms of the total vote, the 1996 result remains one of the closest in U.S. history. This remains the last election in which Republicans won a majority of seats in the New Jersey delegation, and it was also the first election since 1872 in which Republicans won a majority of seats in Mississippi's delegation.

== Special elections ==
District	Incumbent	Party	First elected	Result	Candidates
California 37	Walter R. Tucker III	Democratic	1992	Incumbent resigned December 15, 1995 due to scandals during his past tenure as Mayor of Compton, California. New member elected March 26, 1996. Democratic hold.	▌ ✓ Juanita Millender-McDonald (Democratic) 27.3%; ▌Willard Murray (Democratic) 20.4%; ▌Omar Bradley (Democratic) 13.7%; ▌Paul H. Richards (Democratic) 11.8%; ▌Robert M. Sausedo (Democratic) 8.9%; ▌Robin Tucker (Democratic) 7.2%; ▌Charlie Davis (Democratic) 5.0%; ▌Murry J. Carter (Democratic) 3.0%; ▌Joyce Harris (Democratic) 2.6%
Maryland 7	Kweisi Mfume	Democratic	1986	Incumbent resigned February 15, 1996 to become President of the NAACP. New member elected April 16, 1996. Democratic hold.	▌ ✓ Elijah Cummings (Democratic) 80.9%; ▌Kenneth Konder (Republican) 19.1%
Oregon 3	Ron Wyden	Democratic	1980	Incumbent resigned February 6, 1996 when elected U.S. Senator. New member elected May 21, 1996. Democratic hold.	▌ ✓ Earl Blumenauer (Democratic) 68.4%; ▌Mark Brunelle (Republican) 24.8%; ▌Joe Keating (Pacific Green) 4.0%; ▌Victoria P. Guillebeau (Socialist) 2.3%
Kansas 2	Sam Brownback	Republican	1994	Incumbent resigned November 27, 1996 when elected U.S. Senator. New member elected November 5, 1996. Winner also elected to the next term, see below. Republican hold.	▌ ✓ Jim Ryun (Republican) 52.20%; ▌John Frieden (Democratic) 45.48%; ▌Art Clack (Libertarian) 2.32% (Note: Same results as the general election, but seated early.)
Missouri 8	Bill Emerson	Republican	1980	Incumbent died June 22, 1996. New member elected November 5, 1996. Republican hold. Winner also elected to the next term, see below.	▌ ✓ Jo Ann Emerson (Republican) 63.31%; ▌Emily Firebaugh (Democratic) 34.15%; ▌Greg Tlapek (Libertarian) 2.54%

== Results summary ==
Popular vote and seats total by states

↓
206	2	227
Democratic	(Note: There were two Independents.)	Republican

Party	Seats			Seat percentage	Vote percentage	Popular vote
Party	1994	Elected	Net change	Seat percentage	Vote percentage	Popular vote
Republican Party	230	227	▼3	52.4%	48.15%	43,447,962
Democratic Party	204	206	▲2	47.4%	48.22%	43,507,586
Libertarian Party	0	0	Steady	0.0%	0.7%	651,448
Independent	1	2	▲1	0.2%	0.6%	572,746
Natural Law Party	0	0	Steady	0.0%	0.6%	518,413
Reform Party	0	0	Steady	0.0%	0.2%	178,475
U.S. Taxpayers' Party	0	0	Steady	0.0%	0.1%	54,054
Independence Party	0	0	Steady	0.0%	0.1%	48,272
Peace and Freedom Party	0	0	Steady	0.0%	0.1%	48,136
Others	0	0	Steady	0.0%	1.3%	1,206,375
Totals	435	435	Steady	100.0%	100.0%	90,233,467

Source: Election Statistics – Office of the Clerk

Popular vote
Democratic	48.22%
Republican	48.15%
Libertarian	0.72%
Others	2.91%

House seats
Republican	52.41%
Democratic	47.36%
Others	0.23%

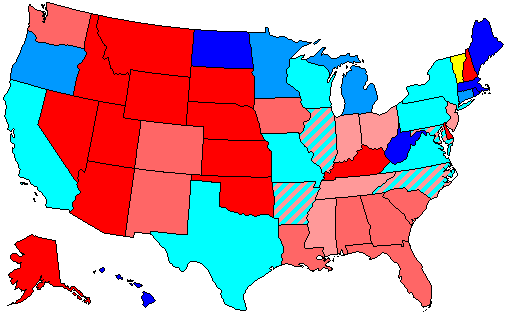
House seats by party holding plurality in state: 80+% Democratic / 80+% Republican; 60+% to 80% Democratic / 60+% to 80% Republican; up to 60% Democratic / up to 60% Republican; 80+% Independent

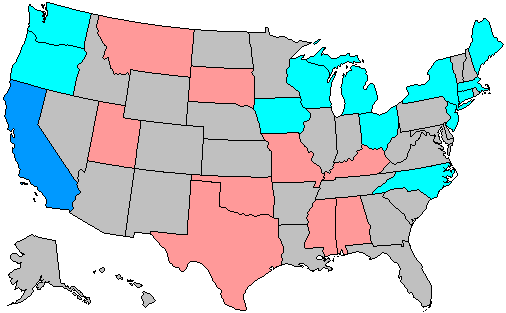
Change in House seats by party: 3 to 5 Democratic gain; 1 to 2 Democratic gain / 1 to 2 Republican gain; no net change

== Retiring incumbents ==
50 incumbents retired: 29 Democrats and 21 Republicans, giving the Republicans a net gain of six seats from the Democrats.

=== Democrats ===
==== Democratic hold ====
1. Arkansas's 1st district: Blanche Lincoln
2. Arkansas's 2nd district: Ray Thornton
3. California's 24th district: Anthony Beilenson
4. Colorado's 1st district: Pat Schroeder
5. Florida's 2nd district: Pete Peterson
6. Florida's 11th district: Sam Gibbons
7. Florida's 19th district: Harry Johnston
8. Illinois's 7th district: Cardiss Collins
9. Indiana's 10th district: Andrew Jacobs Jr.
10. Massachusetts's 10th district: Gerry Studds
11. New Jersey's 9th district: Robert Torricelli, to run for U.S. senator
12. North Carolina's 7th district: Charlie Rose
13. Rhode Island's 2nd district: Jack Reed, to run for U.S. senator
14. Tennessee's 9th district: Harold Ford Sr.
15. Texas's 1st district: Jim Chapman, to run for U.S. senator
16. Texas's 2nd district: Charlie Wilson
17. Texas's 15th district: Kika de la Garza
18. Texas's 16th district: Ron Coleman
19. Virginia's 5th district: Lewis F. Payne Jr.

==== Republican gain ====
1. Alabama's 3rd district: Glen Browder, to run for U.S. senator
2. Alabama's 4th district: Tom Bevill
3. Illinois's 20th district: Dick Durbin, to run for U.S. senator
4. Louisiana's 5th district: Cleo Fields
5. Mississippi's 3rd district: Sonny Montgomery
6. Montana's at-large district: Pat Williams
7. Oklahoma's 3rd district: Bill Brewster
8. South Dakota's at-large district: Tim Johnson, to run for U.S. senator
9. Texas's 5th district: John Bryant, to run for U.S. senator
10. Texas's 12th district: Pete Geren

=== Republicans ===
==== Republican hold ====
1. Arkansas's 3rd district: Tim Hutchinson, to run for U.S. senator
2. California's 27th district: Carlos Moorhead
3. Colorado's 4th district: Wayne Allard, to run for U.S. senator
4. Indiana's 7th district: John Myers
5. Kansas's 1st district: Pat Roberts, to run for U.S. senator
6. Kansas's 2nd district: Sam Brownback, to run for U.S. senator
7. Kansas's 3rd district: Jan Meyers
8. Missouri's 7th district: Mel Hancock
9. Nevada's 2nd district: Barbara Vucanovich
10. New Hampshire's 1st district: Bill Zeliff, to run for governor
11. New Jersey's 12th district: Dick Zimmer, to run for U.S. senator
12. Oregon's 2nd district: Wes Cooley
13. Pennsylvania's 5th district: William Clinger
14. Pennsylvania's 16th district: Bob Walker
15. Tennessee's 1st district: Jimmy Quillen
16. Texas's 8th district: Jack Fields
17. Utah's 2nd district: Enid Greene

==== Democratic gain ====
1. Iowa's 3rd district: Jim Ross Lightfoot, to run for U.S. senator
2. Louisiana's 7th district: Jimmy Hayes, to run for U.S. senator
3. Wisconsin's 3rd district: Steve Gunderson
4. Wisconsin's 8th district: Toby Roth

== Incumbents defeated ==
=== In primary elections ===
==== Democrats ====
1. Michigan's 15th district: Barbara-Rose Collins lost to Carolyn Cheeks Kilpatrick, who later won the general election.

==== Republicans ====
1. Texas's 14th district: Greg Laughlin lost to Ron Paul, who later won the general election.

=== In the general elections ===
21 seats switched parties in the November elections, giving the Democrats a net gain of 15 seats from the Republicans.

==== Democrats who lost to Republicans ====
1. Kentucky's 3rd district: Mike Ward lost to Anne Northup.
2. Missouri's 9th district: Harold Volkmer lost to Kenny Hulshof.
3. Utah's 3rd district: Bill Orton lost to Chris Cannon.

==== Republicans who lost to Democrats ====
1. California's 10th district: Bill Baker lost to Ellen Tauscher.
2. California's 22nd district: Andrea Seastrand lost to Walter Capps.
3. California's 46th district: Bob Dornan lost to Loretta Sanchez.
4. Connecticut's 5th district: Gary Franks lost to James H. Maloney.
5. Illinois's 5th district: Michael Flanagan lost to Rod Blagojevich.
6. Maine's 1st district: James B. Longley Jr. lost to Tom Allen.
7. Massachusetts's 3rd district: Peter Blute lost to Jim McGovern.
8. Massachusetts's 6th district: Peter G. Torkildsen lost to John F. Tierney.
9. Michigan's 8th district: Dick Chrysler lost to Debbie Stabenow.
10. New Jersey's 8th district: Bill Martini lost to Bill Pascrell.
11. New York's 4th district: Dan Frisa lost to Carolyn McCarthy.
12. North Carolina's 2nd district: David Funderburk lost to Bob Etheridge.
13. North Carolina's 4th district: Fred Heineman lost to David Price in a rematch of the 1994 election.
14. Ohio's 6th district: Frank Cremeans lost to Ted Strickland.
15. Ohio's 10th district: Martin Hoke lost to Dennis Kucinich.
16. Oregon's 5th district: Jim Bunn lost to Darlene Hooley.
17. Texas's 9th district: Steve Stockman lost to Nick Lampson.
18. Washington's 9th district: Randy Tate lost to Adam Smith.

== Closest races ==
Eighty races were decided by 10% or lower.

District	Winner	Margin
Pennsylvania 13th	Republican	0.03%
Massachusetts 6th	Democratic (flip)	0.13%
Washington 3rd	Republican	0.36%
Illinois 20th	Republican (flip)	0.51%
Kentucky 3rd	Republican (flip)	0.52%
Connecticut 6th	Republican	0.70%
Washington 2nd	Republican	0.75%
California 46th	Democratic (flip)	0.96%
California 42nd	Democratic	0.96%
Arizona 6th	Republican	1.10%
Pennsylvania 21st	Republican	1.36%
California 10th	Democratic (flip)	0.36%
Indiana 8th	Republican	1.66% (Note: This seat was the tipping point seat for a Republican majority.)
Alabama 4th	Republican (flip)	1.70%
Iowa 3rd	Democratic (flip)	1.71%
Wisconsin 1st	Republican	1.83% (Note: This seat was the tipping point seat for a Democratic majority.)
Missouri 9th	Republican (flip)	2.36%
Idaho 1st	Republican	2.43%
Ohio 6th	Democratic (flip)	2.65%
Ohio 10th	Democratic (flip)	2.74%
Washington 9th	Democratic (flip)	2.88%
Alabama 3rd	Republican (flip)	3.09%
New Jersey 8th	Democratic (flip)	3.24%
New Hampshire 1st	Republican	3.42%
Texas 14th	Republican	3.45%
Kansas 4th	Republican	3.49%
Illinois 11th	Republican	3.57%
New Jersey 12th	Republican	3.80%
Ohio 18th	Republican	3.86%
Utah 3rd	Republican (flip)	3.87%
Hawaii 1st	Democratic	3.88%
Wisconsin 8th	Democratic (flip)	4.07%
Wisconsin 3rd	Democratic (flip)	4.19%
California 22nd	Democratic (flip)	4.22%
Texas 17th	Democratic	4.27%
Kansas 3rd	Republican	4.41%
Illinois 17th	Democratic	4.66%
Georgia 10th	Republican	4.69%
Arkansas 2nd	Democratic	4.69%
Texas 1st	Democratic	4.82%
Georgia 8th	Republican	5.12%
Oregon 5th	Democratic (flip)	5.18%
Iowa 4th	Republican	5.31%
Massachusetts 1st	Democratic	5.48%
Minnesota 1st	Republican	5.50%
Texas 9th	Democratic (flip)	5.67%
California 24th	Democratic	5.85%
Washington 4th	Republican	5.92%
Connecticut 5th	Democratic (flip)	6.13%
Texas 5th	Republican (flip)	6.14%
California 1st	Republican	6.18%
Oklahoma 3rd	Republican (flip)	6.20%
Louisiana 7th	Democratic (flip)	6.24%
Nevada 1st	Republican	6.60%
Oregon 1st	Democratic	6.62%
Texas 2nd	Democratic	6.64%
Connecticut 2nd	Democratic	6.65%
Kansas 2nd	Republican	6.72%
North Carolina 2nd	Democratic (flip)	6.87%
New York 19th	Republican	6.90%
California 27th	Republican	7.00%
New Hampshire 2nd	Republican	7.03%
North Carolina 7th	Democratic	7.06%
Kentucky 1st	Republican	7.10%
Iowa 1st	Republican	7.21%
Washington 1st	Republican	7.48%
Iowa 2nd	Republican	7.56%
Massachusetts 3rd	Democratic (flip)	7.59%
Pennsylvania 20th	Democratic	7.79%
Georgia 2nd	Democratic	7.93%
Indiana 10th	Democratic	8.11%
Arkansas 1st	Democratic	8.45%
Florida 15th	Republican	8.52%
California 36th	Democratic	8.56%
South Carolina 5th	Democratic	8.82%
Montana at-large	Republican (flip)	9.26%
New York 1st	Republican	9.44%
Michigan 8th	Democratic (flip)	9.62%
New York 30th	Republican	9.63%
California 38th	Republican	9.85%

== Alabama ==
District	Incumbent			This race	
District	Representative	Party	First elected	Results	Candidates
Alabama 1	Sonny Callahan	Republican	1984	Incumbent re-elected.	▌ ✓ Sonny Callahan (Republican) 64.36%; ▌Don Womack (Democratic) 33.82%; ▌Bob Burns (Libertarian) 1.61%
Alabama 2	Terry Everett	Republican	1992	Incumbent re-elected.	▌ ✓ Terry Everett (Republican) 63.19%; ▌Bob Gaines (Democratic) 35.42%; ▌Michael Probst (Libertarian) 1.26%
Alabama 3	Glen Browder	Democratic	1989 (Special)	Incumbent retired to run for U.S. senator. Republican gain.	▌ ✓ Bob Riley (Republican) 50.42%; ▌Ted Little (Democratic) 47.3%; ▌Lucy Lawrence (Natural Law) 1.20%; ▌R.E. Stokes (Libertarian) 1.02%
Alabama 4	Tom Bevill	Democratic	1966	Incumbent retired. Republican gain.	▌ ✓ Robert Aderholt (Republican) 49.89%; ▌Bob Wilson (Democratic) 48.20%; ▌Alan F. Barksdale (Libertarian) 1.80%
Alabama 5	Bud Cramer	Democratic	1990	Incumbent re-elected.	▌ ✓ Bud Cramer (Democratic) 55.68%; ▌Wayne Parker (Republican) 42.19%; ▌Shirley Madison (Natural Law) 1.21%; ▌Craig Goodrich (Libertarian) 0.90%
Alabama 6	Spencer Bachus	Republican	1992	Incumbent re-elected.	▌ ✓ Spencer Bachus (Republican) 70.93%; ▌Mary Lynn Bates (Democratic) 27.31%; ▌Franklin Harris (Libertarian) 0.90%; ▌Diane Vogel (Natural Law) 0.83%
Alabama 7	Earl Hilliard	Democratic	1992	Incumbent re-elected.	▌ ✓ Earl Hilliard (Democratic) 71.13%; ▌Joe Powell (Republican) 27.14%; ▌Ken Hager (Libertarian) 1.64%

== Alaska ==
District	Incumbent			This race	
District	Representative	Party	First elected	Results	Candidates
Alaska at-large	Don Young	Republican	1973 (Special)	Incumbent re-elected.	▌ ✓ Don Young (Republican) 59.41%; ▌Georgianna Lincoln (Democratic) 36.42%; ▌William Nemec (AIP) 2.15%; ▌John Grames (Green) 1.93%

== Arizona ==
District	Incumbent			This race	
District	Representative	Party	First elected	Results	Candidates
Arizona 1	Matt Salmon	Republican	1994	Incumbent re-elected.	▌ ✓ Matt Salmon (Republican) 60.18%; ▌John Cox (Democratic) 39.82%
Arizona 2	Ed Pastor	Democratic	1991 (Special)	Incumbent re-elected.	▌ ✓ Ed Pastor (Democratic) 65.01%; ▌Jim Buster (Republican) 30.76%; ▌Alice Bangle (Libertarian) 4.23%
Arizona 3	Bob Stump	Republican	1976 (Note: Stump was originally elected as a Democrat. He switched parties in 1982 and was re-elected as such that year.)	Incumbent re-elected.	▌ ✓ Bob Stump (Republican) 66.52%; ▌Alexander Schneider (Democratic) 33.48%
Arizona 4	John Shadegg	Republican	1994	Incumbent re-elected.	▌ ✓ John Shadegg (Republican) 66.78%; ▌Maria Milton (Democratic) 33.22%
Arizona 5	Jim Kolbe	Republican	1984	Incumbent re-elected.	▌ ✓ Jim Kolbe (Republican) 68.74%; ▌Mort Nelson (Democratic) 25.91%; ▌John Zajac (Libertarian) 2.81%; ▌Ed Finkelstein (Reform) 2.54%
Arizona 6	J. D. Hayworth	Republican	1994	Incumbent re-elected.	▌ ✓ J. D. Hayworth (Republican) 47.57%; ▌Steve Owens (Democratic) 46.60%; ▌Robert Anderson (Libertarian) 5.84%

== Arkansas ==
District	Incumbent			This race	
District	Representative	Party	First elected	Results	Candidates
Arkansas 1	Blanche Lincoln	Democratic	1992	Incumbent retired. Democratic hold.	▌ ✓ Marion Berry (Democratic) 52.78%; ▌Warren Dupwe (Republican) 44.34%; ▌Keith Carle (Reform) 2.87%
Arkansas 2	Ray Thornton	Democratic	1972; 1978 (retired); 1990	Incumbent retired to run for Arkansas Supreme Court. Democratic hold.	▌ ✓ Vic Snyder (Democratic) 52.34%; ▌Bud Cummins (Republican) 47.65%
Arkansas 3	Tim Hutchinson	Republican	1992	Incumbent retired to run for U.S. senator. Republican hold.	▌ ✓ Asa Hutchinson (Republican) 55.70%; ▌Ann Henry (Democratic) 41.84%; ▌Tony Joe Huffman (Reform) 2.43%
Arkansas 4	Jay Dickey	Republican	1992	Incumbent re-elected.	▌ ✓ Jay Dickey (Republican) 63.50%; ▌Vincent Tolliver (Democratic) 36.50%

== California ==
District	Incumbent			This race	
District	Representative	Party	First elected	Results	Candidates
California 1	Frank Riggs	Republican	1990; 1992 (defeated); 1994	Incumbent re-elected.	▌ ✓ Frank Riggs (Republican) 49.63%; ▌Michela Alioto (Democratic) 43.46%; ▌Emil Rossi (Libertarian) 6.91%
California 2	Wally Herger	Republican	1986	Incumbent re-elected.	▌ ✓ Wally Herger (Republican) 60.8%; ▌Roberts Braden (Democratic) 33.73%; ▌Patrice Thiessen (Natural Law) 3.04%; ▌William Brunner (Libertarian) 2.42%
California 3	Vic Fazio	Democratic	1978	Incumbent re-elected.	▌ ✓ Vic Fazio (Democratic) 53.52%; ▌Tim Lefever (Republican) 41.1%; ▌Timothy Erich (Reform) 3.47%; ▌Erin Donelle (Libertarian) 1.91%
California 4	John Doolittle	Republican	1990	Incumbent re-elected.	▌ ✓ John Doolittle (Republican) 60.46%; ▌Katie Hirning (Democratic) 36.1%; ▌Patrick Lee McHargue (Libertarian) 3.43%
California 5	Bob Matsui	Democratic	1978	Incumbent re-elected.	▌ ✓ Bob Matsui (Democratic) 70.44%; ▌Robert S. Dinsmore (Republican) 26.15%; ▌Joseph B. Miller (Libertarian) 1.26%; ▌Gordon D. Mors (American Independent) 1.1%; ▌Charles Kersey (Natural Law) 1.05%
California 6	Lynn Woolsey	Democratic	1992	Incumbent re-elected.	▌ ✓ Lynn Woolsey (Democratic) 61.83%; ▌Duane Hughes (Republican) 33.99%; ▌Ernest K. Jones Jr. (Peace and Freedom) 2.54%; ▌Bruce Kendall (Natural Law) 1.63%
California 7	George Miller	Democratic	1974	Incumbent re-elected.	▌ ✓ George Miller (Democratic) 71.8%; ▌Norman Reece (Republican) 22.28%; ▌William C. Thompson (Reform) 3.6%; ▌Bob Liatunick (Natural Law) 2.32%
California 8	Nancy Pelosi	Democratic	1987 (Special)	Incumbent re-elected.	▌ ✓ Nancy Pelosi (Democratic) 84.34%; ▌Justin Raimondo (Republican) 12.39%; ▌David Smithstein (Natural Law) 3.26%
California 9	Ron Dellums	Democratic	1970	Incumbent re-elected.	▌ ✓ Ron Dellums (Democratic) 77.03%; ▌Deborah Wright (Republican) 18.47%; ▌Tom Condit (Peace and Freedom) 2.77%; ▌Jack Forem (Natural Law) 1.73%
California 10	Bill Baker	Republican	1992	Incumbent lost re-election. Democratic gain.	▌ ✓ Ellen Tauscher (Democratic) 48.63%; ▌Bill Baker (Republican) 47.19%; ▌John Place (Reform) 2.24%; ▌Valerie Janlois (Natural Law) 1.08%; ▌Gregory Lyon (Libertarian) 0.86%
California 11	Richard Pombo	Republican	1992	Incumbent re-elected.	▌ ✓ Richard Pombo (Republican) 59.35%; ▌Jason Silva (Democratic) 36.19%; ▌Kelly Rego (Libertarian) 2.8%; ▌Selene Bush (Natural Law) 1.66%
California 12	Tom Lantos	Democratic	1980	Incumbent re-elected.	▌ ✓ Tom Lantos (Democratic) 71.69%; ▌Storm Jenkins (Republican) 23.7%; ▌Christopher Schmidt (Libertarian) 2.94%; ▌Richard Borg (Natural Law) 1.67%
California 13	Pete Stark	Democratic	1972	Incumbent re-elected.	▌ ✓ Pete Stark (Democratic) 65.18%; ▌James Fay (Republican) 30.41%; ▌Terry Savage (Libertarian) 4.41%
California 14	Anna Eshoo	Democratic	1992	Incumbent re-elected.	▌ ✓ Anna Eshoo (Democratic) 64.87%; ▌Ben Brink (Republican) 31.1%; ▌Timothy Thompson (Peace and Freedom) 1.59%; ▌Joseph Dehn III (Libertarian) 1.52%; ▌Robert Wells (Natural Law) 0.93%
California 15	Tom Campbell	Republican	1988; 1992 (defeated); 1995 (special)	Incumbent re-elected.	▌ ✓ Tom Campbell (Republican) 58.5%; ▌Dick Lane (Democratic) 34.84%; ▌Valli Sharpe-Geisler (Reform) 2.75%; ▌Ed Wimmers (Libertarian) 2.42%; ▌Bruce Currivan (Natural Law) 1.49%
California 16	Zoe Lofgren	Democratic	1994	Incumbent re-elected.	▌ ✓ Zoe Lofgren (Democratic) 65.65%; ▌Chuck Wojslaw (Republican) 30.16%; ▌David Bonino (Libertarian) 2.88%; ▌Abaan Abu-Shumays (Natural Law) 1.3%
California 17	Sam Farr	Democratic	1993	Incumbent re-elected.	▌ ✓ Sam Farr (Democratic) 58.87%; ▌Jess Brown (Republican) 37.77%; ▌John H. Black (Libertarian) 3.36%
California 18	Gary Condit	Democratic	1989	Incumbent re-elected.	▌ ✓ Gary Condit (Democratic) 65.72%; ▌Bill Conrad (Republican) 31.82%; ▌James B. Morzella (Libertarian) 1.35%; ▌Page Roth Riskin (Natural Law) 1.1%
California 19	George Radanovich	Republican	1994	Incumbent re-elected.	▌ ✓ George Radanovich (Republican) 66.58%; ▌Paul Barile (Democratic) 28.32%; ▌Pamela Pescosolido (Libertarian) 2.95%; ▌David Adalian (Natural Law) 2.15%
California 20	Cal Dooley	Democratic	1990	Incumbent re-elected.	▌ ✓ Cal Dooley (Democratic) 56.51%; ▌Trice Harvey (Republican) 39.13%; ▌Jonathan Richter (Libertarian) 4.36%
California 21	Bill Thomas	Republican	1978	Incumbent re-elected.	▌ ✓ Bill Thomas (Republican) 65.81%; ▌Deborah A. Vollmer (Democratic) 26.5%; ▌John Evans (Reform) 4.24%; ▌Jane Bialosky (Natural Law) 1.77%; ▌Mike Hodges (Libertarian) 1.59%
California 22	Andrea Seastrand	Republican	1994	Incumbent lost re-election. Democratic gain.	▌ ✓ Walter Capps (Democratic) 48.45%; ▌Andrea Seastrand (Republican) 44.22%; ▌Steven Wheeler (Independent) 4.03%; ▌Richard Dick Porter (Reform) 1.63%; Others: ▌David L. Bersohn (Libertarian) 0.91%; ▌Dawn Tomastik (Natural Law) 0.76%
California 23	Elton Gallegly	Republican	1986	Incumbent re-elected.	▌ ✓ Elton Gallegly (Republican) 59.59%; ▌Robert Unruhe (Democratic) 35.1%; ▌Gail Lightfoot (Libertarian) 4.18%; ▌Stephen Hospodar (Natural Law) 1.12%
California 24	Anthony Beilenson	Democratic	1976	Incumbent retired. Democratic hold.	▌ ✓ Brad Sherman (Democratic) 49.43%; ▌Rich Sybert (Republican) 43.58%; ▌Ralph L. Shroyer (Peace and Freedom) 2.92%; ▌Erich D. Miller (Libertarian) 2.65%; ▌Ron Lawrence (Natural Law) 1.43%
California 25	Buck McKeon	Republican	1992	Incumbent re-elected.	▌ ✓ Buck McKeon (Republican) 62.4%; ▌Diane Trautman (Democratic) 33.17%; ▌Bruce Acker (Libertarian) 3.15%; ▌Justin Charles Gerber (Peace and Freedom) 1.28%
California 26	Howard Berman	Democratic	1982	Incumbent re-elected.	▌ ✓ Howard Berman (Democratic) 65.87%; ▌Bill Glass (Republican) 28.61%; ▌Scott Fritschler (Libertarian) 3.45%; ▌Gary Hearne (Natural Law) 2.07%
California 27	Carlos Moorhead	Republican	1972	Incumbent retired. Republican hold.	▌ ✓ James E. Rogan (Republican) 50.18%; ▌Doug Kahn (Democratic) 43.18%; ▌Elizabeth Michael (Libertarian) 3.5%; ▌Walt Contreras Sheasby (Green) 2.21%; ▌Martin Zucker (Natural Law) 0.93%
California 28	David Dreier	Republican	1980	Incumbent re-elected.	▌ ✓ David Dreier (Republican) 60.67%; ▌David Levering (Democratic) 36.94%; ▌Ken Saurenman (Libertarian) 2.38%
California 29	Henry Waxman	Democratic	1974	Incumbent re-elected.	▌ ✓ Henry Waxman (Democratic) 67.63%; ▌Paul Stepanek (Republican) 24.6%; ▌John Peter Daly (Peace and Freedom) 4.1%; ▌Michael J. Binkley (Libertarian) 2.22%; ▌Brian Rees (Natural Law) 1.44%
California 30	Xavier Becerra	Democratic	1992	Incumbent re-elected.	▌ ✓ Xavier Becerra (Democratic) 72.32%; ▌Patricia Parker (Republican) 18.71%; ▌Pam Probst (Libertarian) 3.42%; ▌Shirley Mandel (Peace and Freedom) 3.1%; ▌Rosemary Watson-Frith (Natural Law) 2.44%
California 31	Matthew G. Martínez	Democratic	1982	Incumbent re-elected.	▌ ✓ Matthew G. Martínez (Democratic) 67.47%; ▌John Flores (Republican) 27.95%; ▌Michael Everling (Republican) 4.58%
California 32	Julian Dixon	Democratic	1978	Incumbent re-elected.	▌ ✓ Julian Dixon (Democratic) 82.36%; ▌Lawrence Ardito (Republican) 12.39%; ▌Neal Donner (Libertarian) 4.22%; ▌Rashied Jibri (Natural Law) 1.03%
California 33	Lucille Roybal-Allard	Democratic	1992	Incumbent re-elected.	▌ ✓ Lucille Roybal-Allard (Democratic) 82.1%; ▌John Leonard (Republican) 14.09%; ▌Howard Johnson (Libertarian) 3.81%
California 34	Esteban Torres	Democratic	1982	Incumbent re-elected.	▌ ✓ Esteban Torres (Democratic) 68.43%; ▌David Nunez (Republican) 26.62%; ▌James W. Scott (American Independent) 2.98%; ▌David Argall (Libertarian) 1.98%
California 35	Maxine Waters	Democratic	1990	Incumbent re-elected.	▌ ✓ Maxine Waters (Democratic) 85.5%; ▌Eric Carlson (Republican) 12.09%; ▌Gordon M. Mego (American Independent) 2.4%
California 36	Jane Harman	Democratic	1992	Incumbent re-elected.	▌ ✓ Jane Harman (Democratic) 52.46%; ▌Susan Brooks (Republican) 43.9%; ▌Bruce Dovner (Libertarian) 2.2%; ▌Bradley McManus (Natural Law) 1.44%
California 37	Juanita Millender-McDonald	Democratic	1996 (special)	Incumbent re-elected.	▌ ✓ Juanita Millender-McDonald (Democratic) 85%; ▌Michael Voetee (Republican) 15%
California 38	Steve Horn	Republican	1992	Incumbent re-elected.	▌ ✓ Steve Horn (Republican) 52.57%; ▌Rick Zbur (Democratic) 42.72%; ▌William Yeager (Green) 2.75%; ▌Paul Gautreau (Libertarian) 1.95%
California 39	Ed Royce	Republican	1992	Incumbent re-elected.	▌ ✓ Ed Royce (Republican) 62.8%; ▌Bob Davis (Democratic) 31.93%; ▌Jack Dean (Libertarian) 5.27%
California 40	Jerry Lewis	Republican	1978	Incumbent re-elected.	▌ ✓ Jerry Lewis (Republican) 64.9%; ▌Robert Conaway (Democratic) 28.96%; ▌Hale McGee (American Independent) 3.26%; ▌Joseph Kelley (Libertarian) 2.87%
California 41	Jay Kim	Republican	1992	Incumbent re-elected.	▌ ✓ Jay Kim (Republican) 58.46%; ▌Richard Waldron (Democratic) 32.98%; ▌Richard G. Newhouse (Libertarian) 4.97%; ▌David Kramer (Natural Law) 3.5%
California 42	George Brown Jr.	Democratic	1962; 1970 (retired); 1972	Incumbent re-elected.	▌ ✓ George Brown Jr. (Democratic) 50.48%; ▌Linda Wilde (Republican) 49.52%
California 43	Ken Calvert	Republican	1992	Incumbent re-elected.	▌ ✓ Ken Calvert (Republican) 54.72%; ▌Guy C. Kimbrough (Democratic) 37.94%; ▌Annie Wallack (Natural Law) 3.7%; ▌Kevin Akin (Peace and Freedom) 1.86%; ▌Gene L. Berkman (Libertarian) 1.74%
California 44	Sonny Bono	Republican	1994	Incumbent re-elected.	▌ ✓ Sonny Bono (Republican) 57.74%; ▌Anita Rufus (Democratic) 38.54%; ▌Donald Cochran (American Independent) 2.03%; ▌Karen Blasdell-Wilkinson (Natural Law) 1.64%
California 45	Dana Rohrabacher	Republican	1988	Incumbent re-elected.	▌ ✓ Dana Rohrabacher (Republican) 60.98%; ▌Sally Alexander (Democratic) 33.24%; ▌Mark F. Murphy (Libertarian) 4.29%; ▌Rand McDevitt (Natural Law) 1.49%
California 46	Bob Dornan	Republican	1976; 1982 (retired); 1984	Incumbent lost re-election. Democratic gain.	▌ ✓ Loretta Sanchez (Democratic) 46.8%; ▌Bob Dornan (Republican) 45.84%; ▌Lawrence John Stafford (Reform) 3.16%; ▌Thomas Reimer (Libertarian) 2.28%; ▌Carlos Aguirre (Natural Law) 1.92%
California 47	Christopher Cox	Republican	1988	Incumbent re-elected.	▌ ✓ Christopher Cox (Republican) 65.66%; ▌Tina Laine (Democratic) 28.86%; ▌Iris Adam (Natural Law) 2.79%; ▌Victor A. Wagner Jr. (Libertarian) 2.68%
California 48	Ron Packard	Republican	1982	Incumbent re-elected.	▌ ✓ Ron Packard (Republican) 65.86%; ▌Dan Farrell (Democratic) 26.9%; ▌Sharon Miles (Natural Law) 3.62%; ▌William Dreu (Reform) 3.62%
California 49	Brian Bilbray	Republican	1994	Incumbent re-elected.	▌ ✓ Brian Bilbray (Republican) 52.62%; ▌Peter Navarro (Democratic) 41.91%; ▌Ernest Lippe (Libertarian) 2.04%; ▌Kevin Hambsch (Reform) 1.82%; ▌Peter Sterling (Natural Law) 1.6%
California 50	Bob Filner	Democratic	1992	Incumbent re-elected.	▌ ✓ Bob Filner (Democratic) 61.86%; ▌Jim Baize (Republican) 32.41%; ▌Dan Clark (Reform) 2.75%; ▌Earl Shepard (Natural Law) 1.81%; ▌Philip Zoebisch (Libertarian) 1.18%
California 51	Duke Cunningham	Republican	1990	Incumbent re-elected.	▌ ✓ Duke Cunningham (Republican) 65.07%; ▌Rita Tamerius (Democratic) 28.93%; ▌Miriam E. Clark (Reform) 2.36%; ▌Jack C. Anderson (Libertarian) 2.31%; ▌Eric Hunter Bourdette (Natural Law) 1.33%
California 52	Duncan L. Hunter	Republican	1980	Incumbent re-elected.	▌ ✓ Duncan L. Hunter (Republican) 65.47%; ▌Darity Wesley (Democratic) 29.78%; ▌Janice Jordan (Peace and Freedom) 2.05%; ▌Dante Ridley (Libertarian) 1.87%; ▌Peter Ballantyne (Natural Law) 0.84%

== Colorado ==
District	Incumbent			This race	
District	Representative	Party	First elected	Results	Candidates
Colorado 1	Pat Schroeder	Democratic	1972	Incumbent retired. Democratic hold.	▌ ✓ Diana DeGette (Democratic) 56.93%; ▌Joe Rogers (Republican) 40.20%; ▌Richard Combs (Libertarian) 2.86%
Colorado 2	David Skaggs	Democratic	1986	Incumbent re-elected.	▌ ✓ David Skaggs (Democratic) 57.04%; ▌Pat Miller (Republican) 38.26%; ▌Larry E. Johnson (Reform) 2.46%; ▌Earl Allen (Libertarian) 2.24%
Colorado 3	Scott McInnis	Republican	1992	Incumbent re-elected.	▌ ✓ Scott McInnis (Republican) 68.87%; ▌Albert Gurule (Democratic) 31.13%
Colorado 4	Wayne Allard	Republican	1990	Incumbent retired to run for U.S. senator. Republican hold.	▌ ✓ Bob Schaffer (Republican) 56.14%; ▌Guy Kelley (Democratic) 38.04%; ▌Wes McKinley (AMS) 3.04%; ▌Cynthia Parker (Natural Law) 2.78%
Colorado 5	Joel Hefley	Republican	1986	Incumbent re-elected.	▌ ✓ Joel Hefley (Republican) 71.94%; ▌Mike Robinson (Democratic) 28.06%
Colorado 6	Daniel Schaefer	Republican	1983	Incumbent re-elected.	▌ ✓ Daniel Schaefer (Republican) 62.24%; ▌Joan Fitz-Gerald (Democratic) 37.76%

== Connecticut ==
District	Incumbent			This race	
District	Representative	Party	First elected	Results	Candidates
Connecticut 1	Barbara Kennelly	Democratic	1982	Incumbent re-elected.	▌ ✓ Barbara Kennelly (Democratic) 73.54%; ▌Kent Sleath (Republican) 24.94%; ▌John Forry (Concerned Citizens) 0.98%; ▌Daniel Wasielewski (Natural Law) 0.53%
Connecticut 2	Sam Gejdenson	Democratic	1980	Incumbent re-elected.	▌ ✓ Sam Gejdenson (Democratic) 51.59%; ▌Edward Munster (Republican) 44.94%; ▌Dianne Ondusko (Independence) 2.90%; ▌Thomas E. Hall (Natural Law) 0.56%
Connecticut 3	Rosa DeLauro	Democratic	1990	Incumbent re-elected.	▌ ✓ Rosa DeLauro (Democratic) 71.35%; ▌John Coppola (Republican) 28.07%; ▌Gail Dalby (Natural Law) 0.58%
Connecticut 4	Chris Shays	Republican	1987 (special)	Incumbent re-elected.	▌ ✓ Chris Shays (Republican) 60.46%; ▌Bill Finch (Democratic) 37.63%; ▌Edward Tonkin (Libertarian) 1.40%; ▌Terry Nevas (Natural Law) 0.52%
Connecticut 5	Gary Franks	Republican	1990	Incumbent lost re-election. Democratic gain.	▌ ✓ James H. Maloney (Democratic) 52.05%; ▌Gary Franks (Republican) 45.92%; ▌Rosita Rodriguez (Concerned Citizens) 1.39%; ▌Walter Thiessen (Libertarian) 0.65%
Connecticut 6	Nancy Johnson	Republican	1982	Incumbent re-elected.	▌ ✓ Nancy Johnson (Republican) 49.62%; ▌Charlotte Koskoff (Democratic) 48.93%; ▌Timothy Knibbs (Concerned Citizens) 1.45%

== Delaware ==
District	Incumbent			This race	
District	Representative	Party	First elected	Results	Candidates
Delaware at-large	Mike Castle	Republican	1992	Incumbent re-elected.	▌ ✓ Mike Castle (Republican) 69.55%; ▌Dennis E. Williams (Democratic) 27.45%; ▌George Jurgensens (Libertarian) 1.50%; ▌Felicia Johnson (US Taxpayers) 1.13%; ▌Bob Mattson (Natural Law) 0.37%

== Florida ==
District	Incumbent			This race	
District	Representative	Party	First elected	Results	Candidates
Florida 1	Joe Scarborough	Republican	1994	Incumbent re-elected.	▌ ✓ Joe Scarborough (Republican) 72.54%; ▌Kevin Beck (Democratic) 27.42%
Florida 2	Pete Peterson	Democratic	1990	Incumbent retired. Democratic hold.	▌ ✓ Allen Boyd (Democratic) 59.44%; ▌Bill Sutton (Republican) 40.50%
Florida 3	Corrine Brown	Democratic	1992	Incumbent re-elected.	▌ ✓ Corrine Brown (Democratic) 61.20%; ▌Preston James Fields (Republican) 38.80%
Florida 4	Tillie Fowler	Republican	1992	Incumbent re-elected.	▌ ✓ Tillie Fowler (Republican); Uncontested
Florida 5	Karen Thurman	Democratic	1992	Incumbent re-elected.	▌ ✓ Karen Thurman (Democratic) 61.68%; ▌Dave Gentry (Republican) 38.32%
Florida 6	Cliff Stearns	Republican	1988	Incumbent re-elected.	▌ ✓ Cliff Stearns (Republican) 67.18%; ▌Newell O'Brien (Democratic) 32.82%
Florida 7	John Mica	Republican	1992	Incumbent re-elected.	▌ ✓ John Mica (Republican) 62.04%; ▌George Stuart (Democratic) 37.93%
Florida 8	Bill McCollum	Republican	1980	Incumbent re-elected.	▌ ✓ Bill McCollum (Republican) 67.47%; ▌Al Krulick (Democratic) 32.52%
Florida 9	Michael Bilirakis	Republican	1982	Incumbent re-elected.	▌ ✓ Michael Bilirakis (Republican) 68.66%; ▌Jerry Provenzano (Democratic) 31.34%
Florida 10	Bill Young	Republican	1970	Incumbent re-elected.	▌ ✓ Bill Young (Republican) 66.61%; ▌Henry Green (Democratic) 33.39%
Florida 11	Sam Gibbons	Democratic	1962	Incumbent retired. Democratic hold.	▌ ✓ Jim Davis (Democratic) 57.91%; ▌Mark Sharpe (Republican) 42.09%
Florida 12	Charles Canady	Republican	1992	Incumbent re-elected.	▌ ✓ Charles Canady (Republican) 61.57%; ▌Mike Canady (Democratic) 38.43%
Florida 13	Dan Miller	Republican	1992	Incumbent re-elected.	▌ ✓ Dan Miller (Republican) 64.34%; ▌Sanford Gordon (Democratic) 35.60%
Florida 14	Porter Goss	Republican	1988	Incumbent re-elected.	▌ ✓ Porter Goss (Republican) 73.49%; ▌Jim Nolan (Democratic) 26.51%
Florida 15	Dave Weldon	Republican	1994	Incumbent re-elected.	▌ ✓ Dave Weldon (Republican) 51.42%; ▌John Byron (Democratic) 42.90%; ▌David Golding (Independent) 5.68%
Florida 16	Mark Foley	Republican	1994	Incumbent re-elected.	▌ ✓ Mark Foley (Republican) 64%; ▌Jim Stuber (Democratic) 36%
Florida 17	Carrie Meek	Democratic	1992	Incumbent re-elected.	▌ ✓ Carrie Meek (Democratic) 88.75%; ▌Wellington Rolle (Republican) 11.24%
Florida 18	Ileana Ros-Lehtinen	Republican	1989 (Special)	Incumbent re-elected.	▌ ✓ Ileana Ros-Lehtinen (Republican); Uncontested
Florida 19	Harry Johnston	Democratic	1988	Incumbent retired. Democratic hold.	▌ ✓ Robert Wexler (Democratic) 65.57%; ▌Beverly Kennedy (Republican) 34.42%
Florida 20	Peter Deutsch	Democratic	1992	Incumbent re-elected.	▌ ✓ Peter Deutsch (Democratic) 64.99%; ▌Jim Jacobs (Republican) 35.01%
Florida 21	Lincoln Díaz-Balart	Republican	1992	Incumbent re-elected.	▌ ✓ Lincoln Díaz-Balart (Republican); Uncontested
Florida 22	Clay Shaw	Republican	1980	Incumbent re-elected.	▌ ✓ Clay Shaw (Republican) 61.86%; ▌Kenneth Cooper (Democratic) 38.14%
Florida 23	Alcee Hastings	Democratic	1992	Incumbent re-elected.	▌ ✓ Alcee Hastings (Democratic) 73.45%; ▌Robert Paul Brown (Republican) 26.53%

== Georgia ==
District	Incumbent			This race	
District	Representative	Party	First elected	Results	Candidates
Georgia 1	Jack Kingston	Republican	1992	Incumbent re-elected.	▌ ✓ Jack Kingston (Republican) 68.21%; ▌Rosemary Kaszans (Democratic) 31.79%
Georgia 2	Sanford Bishop	Democratic	1992	Incumbent re-elected.	▌ ✓ Sanford Bishop (Democratic) 53.97%; ▌Darrel Ealum (Republican) 46.03%
Georgia 3	Mac Collins	Republican	1992	Incumbent re-elected.	▌ ✓ Mac Collins (Republican) 61.11%; ▌Jim Chafin (Democratic) 38.89%
Georgia 4	Cynthia McKinney; Redistricted from the 11th district	Democratic	1992	Incumbent re-elected.	▌ ✓ Cynthia McKinney (Democratic) 57.76%; ▌John Mitnick (Republican) 42.24%
Georgia 5	John Lewis	Democratic	1986	Incumbent re-elected.	▌ ✓ John Lewis (Democratic); Uncontested
Georgia 6	Newt Gingrich	Republican	1978	Incumbent re-elected.	▌ ✓ Newt Gingrich (Republican) 57.80%; ▌Michael Coles (Democratic) 42.20%
Georgia 7	Bob Barr	Republican	1994	Incumbent re-elected.	▌ ✓ Bob Barr (Republican) 57.80%; ▌Charlie Watts (Democratic) 42.20%
Georgia 8	Saxby Chambliss	Republican	1994	Incumbent re-elected.	▌ ✓ Saxby Chambliss (Republican) 52.56%; ▌Jim Wiggins (Democratic) 47.44%
Georgia 9	Nathan Deal	Republican	1992 (Note: Deal was originally elected as a Democrat. He switched parties in April 1995.)	Incumbent re-elected.	▌ ✓ Nathan Deal (Republican) 65.55%; ▌Ken Poston (Democratic) 34.45%
Georgia 10	Charlie Norwood	Republican	1994	Incumbent re-elected.	▌ ✓ Charlie Norwood (Republican) 52.34%; ▌David Bell (Democratic) 47.65%
Georgia 11	John Linder; Redistricted from the 4th district	Republican	1992	Incumbent re-elected.	▌ ✓ John Linder (Republican) 64.31%; ▌Tommy Stephenson (Democratic) 35.69%

== Hawaii ==
District	Incumbent			This race	
District	Representative	Party	First elected	Results	Candidates
Hawaii 1	Neil Abercrombie	Democratic	1986 (special); 1986 (lost renomination); 1990	Incumbent re-elected.	▌ ✓ Neil Abercrombie (Democratic) 50.36%; ▌Orson Swindle (Republican) 46.49%; ▌Mark Duering (Independent) 2.40%; ▌Nicholas Bedworth (Natural Law) 0.75%
Hawaii 2	Patsy Mink	Democratic	1964; 1976 (retired); 1990 (special)	Incumbent re-elected.	▌ ✓ Patsy Mink (Democratic) 60.33%; ▌Tom Pico (Republican) 30.80%; ▌Nolan Crabbe (Independent) 4.27%; ▌James Keefe (Libertarian) 2.64%; ▌Amanda Toulon (Natural Law) 1.97%

== Idaho ==
District	Incumbent			This race	
District	Representative	Party	First elected	Results	Candidates
Idaho 1	Helen Chenoweth	Republican	1994	Incumbent re-elected.	▌ ✓ Helen Chenoweth (Republican) 49.98%; ▌Dan Williams (Democratic) 47.55%; ▌Marion Ellis (Natural Law) 2.47%
Idaho 2	Mike Crapo	Republican	1992	Incumbent re-elected.	▌ ✓ Mike Crapo (Republican) 68.77%; ▌John Seidl (Democratic) 29.50%; ▌John Butler (Natural Law) 1.73%

== Illinois ==
District	Incumbent			This race	
District	Representative	Party	First elected	Results	Candidates
Illinois 1	Bobby Rush	Democratic	1992	Incumbent re-elected.	▌ ✓ Bobby Rush (Democratic) 85.67%; ▌Noel Naughton (Republican) 12.63%; ▌Tim Griffin (Libertarian) 1.70%
Illinois 2	Jesse Jackson Jr.	Democratic	1995	Incumbent re-elected.	▌ ✓ Jesse Jackson Jr. (Democratic) 94.06%; ▌Frank Stratman (Libertarian) 5.93%
Illinois 3	Bill Lipinski	Democratic	1982	Incumbent re-elected.	▌ ✓ Bill Lipinski (Democratic) 65.34%; ▌Jim Nalepa (Republican) 32.02%; ▌George Skaritka (Reform) 1.74%; ▌Robert Prazak (Libertarian) 0.91%
Illinois 4	Luis Gutiérrez	Democratic	1992	Incumbent re-elected.	▌ ✓ Luis Gutiérrez (Democratic) 93.57%; ▌William Passmore (Libertarian) 6.43%
Illinois 5	Michael Flanagan	Republican	1994	Incumbent lost re-election. Democratic gain.	▌ ✓ Rod Blagojevich (Democratic) 64.12%; ▌Michael Flanagan (Republican) 35.87%
Illinois 6	Henry Hyde	Republican	1974	Incumbent re-elected.	▌ ✓ Henry Hyde (Republican) 64.29%; ▌Stephen De La Rosa (Democratic) 33.41%; ▌George Meyers (Libertarian) 2.30%
Illinois 7	Cardiss Collins	Democratic	1973 (special)	Incumbent retired. Democratic hold.	▌ ✓ Danny Davis (Democratic) 82.59%; ▌Randy Borow (Republican) 15.04%; ▌Chauncey Stroud (Independent) 1.07%; Others: ▌Toietta Dixon (Libertarian) 0.87%; ▌Charles A. Winter (Natural Law) 0.42%
Illinois 8	Phil Crane	Republican	1969	Incumbent re-elected.	▌ ✓ Phil Crane (Republican) 62.23%; ▌Betty Hull (Democratic) 36.08%; ▌Daniel Druck (Libertarian) 1.69%
Illinois 9	Sidney R. Yates	Democratic	1948; 1962 (retired); 1964	Incumbent re-elected.	▌ ✓ Sidney R. Yates (Democratic) 63.40%; ▌Joe Walsh (Republican) 36.60%
Illinois 10	John Porter	Republican	1980	Incumbent re-elected.	▌ ✓ John Porter (Republican) 69.09%; ▌Philip Torf (Democratic) 30.91%
Illinois 11	Jerry Weller	Republican	1994	Incumbent re-elected.	▌ ✓ Jerry Weller (Republican) 51.77%; ▌Clem Balanoff (Democratic) 48.23%
Illinois 12	Jerry Costello	Democratic	1988	Incumbent re-elected.	▌ ✓ Jerry Costello (Democratic) 71.59%; ▌Shapley Hunter (Republican) 26.58%; ▌Geoffrey Nathan (Democratic) 1.82%
Illinois 13	Harris Fawell	Republican	1984	Incumbent re-elected.	▌ ✓ Harris Fawell (Republican) 59.93%; ▌Susan Hynes (Democratic) 40.06%
Illinois 14	Dennis Hastert	Republican	1986	Incumbent re-elected.	▌ ✓ Dennis Hastert (Republican) 64.39%; ▌Doug Mains (Democratic) 35.60%
Illinois 15	Tom Ewing	Republican	1991	Incumbent re-elected.	▌ ✓ Tom Ewing (Republican) 57.33%; ▌Laurel Lunt Prussing (Democratic) 42.67%
Illinois 16	Don Manzullo	Republican	1992	Incumbent re-elected.	▌ ✓ Don Manzullo (Republican) 60.29%; ▌Catherine Lee (Democratic) 39.71%
Illinois 17	Lane Evans	Democratic	1982	Incumbent re-elected.	▌ ✓ Lane Evans (Democratic) 51.91%; ▌Mark Baker (Republican) 47.25%; ▌William Herrmann (Libertarian) 0.83%
Illinois 18	Ray LaHood	Republican	1994	Incumbent re-elected.	▌ ✓ Ray LaHood (Republican) 59.25%; ▌Michael D. Curran (Democratic) 40.75%
Illinois 19	Glenn Poshard	Democratic	1988	Incumbent re-elected.	▌ ✓ Glenn Poshard (Democratic) 66.69%; ▌Brent Winters (Republican) 31.83%; Others: ▌Patricia Riker (Natural Law) 0.95%; ▌James Lacher (Libertarian) 0.53%
Illinois 20	Dick Durbin	Democratic	1982	Incumbent retired to run for U.S. senator. Republican gain.	▌ ✓ John Shimkus (Republican) 50.26%; ▌Jay Hoffman (Democratic) 49.74%

== Indiana ==
District	Incumbent			This race	
District	Representative	Party	First elected	Results	Candidates
Indiana 1	Pete Visclosky	Democratic	1984	Incumbent re-elected.	▌ ✓ Pete Visclosky (Democratic) 69.16%; ▌Michael Petyo (Republican) 29.22%; ▌Michael Crass (Libertarian) 1.63%
Indiana 2	David McIntosh	Republican	1994	Incumbent re-elected.	▌ ✓ David McIntosh (Republican) 57.83%; ▌Marc Carmichael (Democratic) 39.98%; ▌Paul E. Zimmerman (Libertarian) 2.19%
Indiana 3	Tim Roemer	Democratic	1990	Incumbent re-elected.	▌ ✓ Tim Roemer (Democratic) 57.92%; ▌Joe Zakas (Republican) 40.90%; ▌Bernie Taylor (Libertarian) 1.18%
Indiana 4	Mark Souder	Republican	1994	Incumbent re-elected.	▌ ✓ Mark Souder (Republican) 58.37%; ▌Gerald Houseman (Democratic) 39.32%; ▌Ken Bisson (Libertarian) 2.31%
Indiana 5	Steve Buyer	Republican	1992	Incumbent re-elected.	▌ ✓ Steve Buyer (Republican) 61.86%; ▌Douglas Clark (Democratic) 35.71%; ▌Tom Lehman (Libertarian) 2.43%
Indiana 6	Dan Burton	Republican	1982	Incumbent re-elected.	▌ ✓ Dan Burton (Republican) 75.02%; ▌Carrie Dillard-Trammell (Democratic) 23.04%; ▌Fred Peterson (Libertarian) 1.93%
Indiana 7	John T. Myers	Republican	1966	Incumbent retired. Republican hold.	▌ ✓ Ed Pease (Republican) 61.96%; ▌Robert Hellmann (Democratic) 34.65%; ▌Barbara Bourland (Libertarian) 3.40%
Indiana 8	John Hostettler	Republican	1994	Incumbent re-elected.	▌ ✓ John Hostettler (Republican) 49.97%; ▌Jonathan Weinzapfel (Democratic) 48.30%; ▌Paul Hager (Libertarian) 1.73%
Indiana 9	Lee Hamilton	Democratic	1964	Incumbent re-elected.	▌ ✓ Lee Hamilton (Democratic) 56.47%; ▌Jean Leising (Republican) 42.51%; ▌Diane Feeney (Libertarian) 1.02%
Indiana 10	Andrew Jacobs Jr.	Democratic	1964; 1972 (defeated); 1974	Incumbent retired. Democratic hold.	▌ ✓ Julia Carson (Democratic) 52.94%; ▌Virginia Murphy Blankenbaker (Republican) 44.83%; ▌Kurt St. Angelo (Libertarian) 2.22%

== Iowa ==
District	Incumbent			This race	
District	Representative	Party	First elected	Results	Candidates
Iowa 1	Jim Leach	Republican	1976	Incumbent re-elected.	▌ ✓ Jim Leach (Republican) 52.84%; ▌Bob Rush (Democratic) 45.62%; Others: ▌Thomas Isenhour (Independent) 0.93%; ▌Michael Cuddehe (Natural Law) 0.57%
Iowa 2	Jim Nussle	Republican	1990	Incumbent re-elected.	▌ ✓ Jim Nussle (Republican) 53.42%; ▌Donna L. Smith (Democratic) 45.86%; Others: ▌Albert Schoeman (Libertarian) 0.38%; ▌Peter Lamoureux (Natural Law) 0.32%
Iowa 3	Jim Ross Lightfoot	Republican	1984	Incumbent retired to run for U.S. senator. Democratic gain.	▌ ✓ Leonard Boswell (Democratic) 49.35%; ▌Mike Mahaffey (Republican) 47.64%; ▌Jay Marcus (Natural Law) 1.36%; ▌Edward Rusk (Working Class) 1.08%; ▌Dick Kruse (Libertarian) 0.54%
Iowa 4	Greg Ganske	Republican	1994	Incumbent re-elected.	▌ ✓ Greg Ganske (Republican) 52.01%; ▌Connie McBurney (Democratic) 46.70%; Others: ▌Rogers Badgett (Natural Law) 0.47%; ▌Carl Olsen (Libertarian) 0.45%; ▌Richard McBride (Socialist Workers) 0.27%
Iowa 5	Tom Latham	Republican	1994	Incumbent re-elected.	▌ ✓ Tom Latham (Republican) 65.45%; ▌MacDonald Smith (Democratic) 33.61%; ▌Michael Dimick (Natural Law) 0.90%

== Kansas ==
District	Incumbent	Party	First elected	Result	Results
Kansas 1	Pat Roberts	Republican	1980	Incumbent retired to run for U.S. senator. Republican hold.	▌ ✓ Jerry Moran (Republican) 73.48%; ▌John Divine (Democratic) 24.49%; ▌Bill Earnest (Libertarian) 2.03%
Kansas 2	Sam Brownback	Republican	1994	Incumbent retired to run for U.S. senator. Republican hold.	▌ ✓ Jim Ryun (Republican) 52.20%; ▌John Frieden (Democratic) 45.48%; ▌Art Clack (Libertarian) 2.32%
Kansas 3	Jan Meyers	Republican	1984	Incumbent retired. Republican hold.	▌ ✓ Vince Snowbarger (Republican) 49.83%; ▌Judy Hancock (Democratic) 45.42%; ▌Randy Gardner (Reform) 3.40%; ▌Charles Clack (Libertarian) 1.34%
Kansas 4	Todd Tiahrt	Republican	1994	Incumbent re-elected.	▌ ✓ Todd Tiahrt (Republican) 50.11%; ▌Randy Rathbun (Democratic) 46.62%; ▌Seth Warren (Libertarian) 3.26%

== Kentucky ==
District	Incumbent	Party	First elected	Result	Results
Kentucky 1	Ed Whitfield	Republican	1994	Incumbent re-elected.	▌ ✓ Ed Whitfield (Republican) 53.55%; ▌Dennis Null (Democratic) 46.45%
Kentucky 2	Ron Lewis	Republican	1994	Incumbent re-elected.	▌ ✓ Ron Lewis (Republican) 58.09%; ▌Joe Wright (Democratic) 41.91%
Kentucky 3	Mike Ward	Democratic	1994	Incumbent lost re-election. Republican gain.	▌ ✓ Anne Northup (Republican) 50.26%; ▌Mike Ward (Democratic) 49.74%
Kentucky 4	Jim Bunning	Republican	1986	Incumbent re-elected.	▌ ✓ Jim Bunning (Republican) 68.39%; ▌Denny Bowman (Democratic) 31.61%
Kentucky 5	Hal Rogers	Republican	1980	Incumbent re-elected.	▌ ✓ Hal Rogers (Republican) Uncontested
Kentucky 6	Scotty Baesler	Democratic	1992	Incumbent re-elected.	▌ ✓ Scotty Baesler (Democratic) 55.70%; ▌Ernie Fletcher (Republican) 44.30%

== Louisiana ==
District	Incumbent			This race	
District	Representative	Party	First elected	Results	Candidates
Louisiana 1	Bob Livingston	Republican	1977 (Special)	Incumbent re-elected.	▌ ✓ Bob Livingston (Republican) Uncontested
Louisiana 2	William Jefferson	Democratic	1990	Incumbent re-elected.	▌ ✓ William Jefferson (Democratic) Uncontested
Louisiana 3	Billy Tauzin	Republican	1980 (Note: Tauzin was first elected as a Democrat. He switched to the Republican Party in August 1995.)	Incumbent re-elected.	▌ ✓ Billy Tauzin (Republican) Uncontested
Louisiana 4	Jim McCrery; Redistricted from the 5th district	Republican	1988	Incumbent re-elected.	▌ ✓ Jim McCrery (Republican) 71.38%; ▌Paul Chachere (Democratic) 28.62%
Louisiana 5	Cleo Fields; Redistricted from the 4th district	Democratic	1992	Incumbent retired. Republican gain.	▌ ✓ John Cooksey (Republican) 58.28%; ▌Francis C. Thompson (Democratic) 41.72%
Louisiana 6	Richard Baker	Republican	1986	Incumbent re-elected.	▌ ✓ Richard Baker (Republican) 69.30%; ▌Steve Myers (Democratic) 30.70%
Louisiana 7	Jimmy Hayes	Republican	1986 (Note: Hayes was first elected as a Democrat. He switched to the Republican Party in December 1995.)	Incumbent retired to run for U.S. senator. Democratic gain.	▌ ✓ Chris John (Democratic) 53.12%; ▌Hunter Lundy (Democratic) 46.88%

== Maine ==
District	Incumbent			This race	
District	Representative	Party	First elected	Results	Candidates
Maine 1	James B. Longley Jr.	Republican	1994	Incumbent lost re-election. Democratic gain.	▌ ✓ Tom Allen (Democratic) 55.30%; ▌James B. Longley Jr. (Republican) 44.68%
Maine 2	John Baldacci	Democratic	1994	Incumbent re-elected.	▌ ✓ John Baldacci (Democratic) 71.92%; ▌Paul R. Young (Republican) 24.81%; ▌Aldric Saucier (Independent) 3.25%

== Maryland ==
District	Incumbent			This race	
District	Representative	Party	First elected	Results	Candidates
Maryland 1	Wayne Gilchrest	Republican	1990	Incumbent re-elected.	▌ ✓ Wayne Gilchrest (Republican) 61.55%; ▌Steven Eastaugh (Democratic) 38.44%
Maryland 2	Bob Ehrlich	Republican	1994	Incumbent re-elected.	▌ ✓ Bob Ehrlich (Republican) 61.82%; ▌Connie Dejuliis (Democratic) 38.17%
Maryland 3	Ben Cardin	Democratic	1986	Incumbent re-elected.	▌ ✓ Ben Cardin (Democratic) 67.31%; ▌Pat McDonough (Republican) 32.69%
Maryland 4	Albert Wynn	Democratic	1992	Incumbent re-elected.	▌ ✓ Albert Wynn (Democratic) 85.19%; ▌John Kimble (Republican) 14.81%
Maryland 5	Steny Hoyer	Democratic	1981	Incumbent re-elected.	▌ ✓ Steny Hoyer (Democratic) 56.92%; ▌John S. Morgan (Republican) 43.08%
Maryland 6	Roscoe Bartlett	Republican	1992	Incumbent re-elected.	▌ ✓ Roscoe Bartlett (Republican) 56.83%; ▌Stephen Crawford (Democratic) 43.16%
Maryland 7	Elijah Cummings	Democratic	1996	Incumbent re-elected.	▌ ✓ Elijah Cummings (Democratic) 83.47%; ▌Kenneth Kondner (Republican) 16.53%
Maryland 8	Connie Morella	Republican	1986	Incumbent re-elected.	▌ ✓ Connie Morella (Republican) 61.22%; ▌Donald Mooers (Democratic) 38.62%

== Massachusetts ==
District	Incumbent			This race	
District	Representative	Party	First elected	Results	Candidates
Massachusetts 1	John Olver	Democratic	1991	Incumbent re-elected.	▌ ✓ John Olver (Democratic) 52.72%; ▌Jane Swift (Republican) 47.24%
Massachusetts 2	Richard Neal	Democratic	1988	Incumbent re-elected.	▌ ✓ Richard Neal (Democratic) 71.67%; ▌Mark Steele (Republican) 21.94%; ▌Scott Andrichak (Independent) 4.04%; ▌Richard Kaynor (Natural Law) 2.25%
Massachusetts 3	Peter Blute	Republican	1992	Incumbent lost re-election. Democratic gain.	▌ ✓ Jim McGovern (Democratic) 52.94%; ▌Peter Blute (Republican) 45.35%; ▌Dale Friedgen (Natural Law) 1.32%
Massachusetts 4	Barney Frank	Democratic	1980	Incumbent re-elected.	▌ ✓ Barney Frank (Democratic) 71.64%; ▌Jonathan Raymond (Republican) 28.33%
Massachusetts 5	Marty Meehan	Democratic	1992	Incumbent re-elected.	▌ ✓ Marty Meehan (Democratic); Uncontested
Massachusetts 6	Peter G. Torkildsen	Republican	1992	Incumbent lost re-election. Democratic gain.	▌ ✓ John F. Tierney (Democratic) 48.18%; ▌Peter G. Torkildsen (Republican) 48.05%; ▌Martin McNulty (Independent) 1.51%; Others: ▌Randal Fritz (Constitution) 0.92%; ▌Benjamin Gatchell (Independent) 0.74%; ▌Orrin Smith (Natural Law) 0.50%
Massachusetts 7	Ed Markey	Democratic	1976	Incumbent re-elected.	▌ ✓ Ed Markey (Democratic) 69.82%; ▌Patricia Long (Republican) 30.13%
Massachusetts 8	Joseph P. Kennedy II	Democratic	1986	Incumbent re-elected.	▌ ✓ Joseph P. Kennedy II (Democratic) 84.26%; ▌Philip Hyde (Republican) 15.63%
Massachusetts 9	Joe Moakley	Democratic	1972	Incumbent re-elected.	▌ ✓ Joe Moakley (Democratic) 72.23%; ▌Paul Gryska (Republican) 27.75%
Massachusetts 10	Gerry Studds	Democratic	1972	Incumbent retired. Democratic hold.	▌ ✓ Bill Delahunt (Democratic) 54.32%; ▌Edward B. Teague III (Republican) 41.74%; ▌Charles Laws (Green) 3.69%

== Michigan ==
District	Incumbent			This race	
District	Representative	Party	First elected	Results	Candidates
Michigan 1	Bart Stupak	Democratic	1992	Incumbent re-elected.	▌ ✓ Bart Stupak (Democratic) 70.67%; ▌Bob Carr (Republican) 27.24%; ▌Michael Oleniczak (Libertarian) 1.10%; ▌Wendy Conway (Natural Law) 0.96%
Michigan 2	Pete Hoekstra	Republican	1992	Incumbent re-elected.	▌ ✓ Pete Hoekstra (Republican) 65.28%; ▌Dan Kruszynski (Democratic) 32.95%; ▌Bruce A. Smith (Libertarian) 1.21%; ▌Henry Ogden Clark (Natural Law) 0.54%
Michigan 3	Vern Ehlers	Republican	1993	Incumbent re-elected.	▌ ✓ Vern Ehlers (Republican) 68.60%; ▌Betsy J. Flory (Democratic) 29.46%; ▌Erwin J. Haas (Libertarian) 1.21%; ▌Eric R. Anderson (Natural Law) 0.70%
Michigan 4	Dave Camp	Republican	1990	Incumbent re-elected.	▌ ✓ Dave Camp (Republican) 65.49%; ▌Lisa A. Donaldson (Democratic) 32.71%; Others: ▌Ben Steele III (Libertarian) 0.99%; ▌Susan I. Arnold (Natural Law) 0.79%
Michigan 5	James Barcia	Democratic	1992	Incumbent re-elected.	▌ ✓ James Barcia (Democratic) 69.98%; ▌Lawrence Sims (Republican) 28.20%; ▌Mark Owen (Libertarian) 1.25%; ▌Brian D. Ellison (Natural Law) 0.55%
Michigan 6	Fred Upton	Republican	1986	Incumbent re-elected.	▌ ✓ Fred Upton (Republican) 67.72%; ▌Clarence Annen (Democratic) 30.69%; ▌Scott Beavers (Libertarian) 1.56%
Michigan 7	Nick Smith	Republican	1992	Incumbent re-elected.	▌ ✓ Nick Smith (Republican) 55.01%; ▌Kim Tunnicliff (Democratic) 42.89%; ▌Robert Broda (Libertarian) 1.41%; ▌Scott K. Williamson (Natural Law) 0.67%
Michigan 8	Dick Chrysler	Republican	1994	Incumbent lost re-election. Democratic gain.	▌ ✓ Debbie Stabenow (Democratic) 53.76%; ▌Dick Chrysler (Republican) 44.14%; ▌Doug MacDonald (Libertarian) 1.45%; ▌Patricia Rayfield Allen (Natural Law) 0.64%
Michigan 9	Dale Kildee	Democratic	1976	Incumbent re-elected.	▌ ✓ Dale Kildee (Democratic) 59.19%; ▌Patrick Nowak (Republican) 38.81%; ▌Malcolm Johnson (Libertarian) 1.50%; ▌Terrence Shulman (Natural Law) 0.49%
Michigan 10	David Bonior	Democratic	1976	Incumbent re-elected.	▌ ✓ David Bonior (Democratic) 54.38%; ▌Susy Avery (Republican) 43.57%; ▌Scott Scott (Libertarian) 1.53%; ▌John D. Litle (Natural Law) 0.51%
Michigan 11	Joe Knollenberg	Republican	1992	Incumbent re-elected.	▌ ✓ Joe Knollenberg (Republican) 61.15%; ▌Morris Frumin (Democratic) 35.90%; ▌Dick Gach (Libertarian) 1.83%; ▌Stuart Goldberg (Natural Law) 1.10%
Michigan 12	Sander Levin	Democratic	1982	Incumbent re-elected.	▌ ✓ Sander Levin (Democratic) 57.40%; ▌John Pappageorge (Republican) 40.54%; ▌Albert J. Titran (Libertarian) 1.33%; ▌Gail Anne Petrosoff (Natural Law) 0.73%
Michigan 13	Lynn Rivers	Democratic	1994	Incumbent re-elected.	▌ ✓ Lynn Rivers (Democratic) 56.57%; ▌Joe Fitzsimmons (Republican) 41.31%; ▌James Montgomery (Libertarian) 1.43%; Others: ▌Jane Cutter (Workers World) 0.45%; ▌Jim Hartnett (Socialist Equality) 0.23%
Michigan 14	John Conyers	Democratic	1964	Incumbent re-elected.	▌ ✓ John Conyers (Democratic) 85.86%; ▌William Ashe (Republican) 12.06%; Others: ▌Scott Boman (Libertarian) 0.93%; ▌Richard R. Miller (Natural Law) 0.40%; ▌Willie Reid (Independent) 0.39%; ▌Helen Halyard (Socialist Equality) 0.36%
Michigan 15	Barbara-Rose Collins	Democratic	1990	Incumbent lost renomination. Democratic hold.	▌ ✓ Carolyn Cheeks Kilpatrick (Democratic) 88.36%; ▌Stephen Hume (Republican) 9.84%; Others: ▌Raymond Warner (Libertarian) 0.83%; ▌Kevin Carey (Workers World) 0.54%; ▌Gregory F. Smith (Natural Law) 0.40%
Michigan 16	John Dingell	Democratic	1955 (special)	Incumbent re-elected.	▌ ✓ John Dingell (Democratic) 62.03%; ▌James DeSana (Republican) 35.68%; ▌Bruce Cain (Libertarian) 1.43%; Others: ▌Noha Fouad Hamze (Workers World) 0.46%; ▌David Sole (Natural Law) 0.38%

== Minnesota ==
District	Incumbent	Party	First elected	Result	Results
Minnesota 1	Gil Gutknecht	Republican	1994	Incumbent re-elected.	▌ ✓ Gil Gutknecht (Republican) 52.67%; ▌Mary Rieder (DFL) 47.17%
Minnesota 2	David Minge	DFL	1992	Incumbent re-elected.	▌ ✓ David Minge (DFL) 54.92%; ▌Gary Revier (Republican) 41.09%; ▌Stan Bentz (Reform) 3.92%
Minnesota 3	Jim Ramstad	Republican	1990	Incumbent re-elected.	▌ ✓ Jim Ramstad (Republican) 70.10%; ▌Stanley Leino (DFL) 29.75%
Minnesota 4	Bruce Vento	DFL	1976	Incumbent re-elected.	▌ ✓ Bruce Vento (DFL) 57.02%; ▌Dennis Newinski (Republican) 36.80%; ▌Richard Gibbons (Reform) 3.64%; ▌Phil Willkie (Grassroots) 1.41%; ▌Dan Vacek (Ind. Grassroots) 1.05%
Minnesota 5	Martin Olav Sabo	DFL	1978	Incumbent re-elected.	▌ ✓ Martin Olav Sabo (DFL) 64.32%; ▌Jack Uldrich (Republican) 28.49%; ▌Erika Anderson (Grassroots) 5.32%; ▌Jennifer Benton (Socialist Workers) 1.74%
Minnesota 6	Bill Luther	DFL	1994	Incumbent re-elected.	▌ ✓ Bill Luther (DFL) 55.81%; ▌Tad Jude (Republican) 43.99%
Minnesota 7	Collin Peterson	DFL	1990	Incumbent re-elected.	▌ ✓ Collin Peterson (DFL) 67.94%; ▌Darrell McKigney (Republican) 31.85%
Minnesota 8	Jim Oberstar	DFL	1974	Incumbent re-elected.	▌ ✓ Jim Oberstar (DFL) 67.31%; ▌Andy Larson (Republican) 25.23%; ▌Stan Estes (Reform) 6.04%; ▌Larry Fuhol (Libertarian) 1.34%

== Mississippi ==
With Republican Chip Pickering flipping the Democratic-held 3rd district, the Republican Party gained a majority in the state's U.S. House delegation for the first time since Reconstruction. This would not occur again until 2010.

District	Incumbent			This race	
District	Representative	Party	First elected	Results	Candidates
Mississippi 1	Roger Wicker	Republican	1994	Incumbent re-elected.	▌ ✓ Roger Wicker (Republican) 67.62%; ▌Henry Boyd (Democratic) 30.60%; ▌Andy Rouse (Libertarian) 1.25%; ▌Luke Lundemo (Natural Law) 0.53%
Mississippi 2	Bennie Thompson	Democratic	1993	Incumbent re-elected.	▌ ✓ Bennie Thompson (Democratic) 59.62%; ▌Danny Covington (Republican) 37.96%; ▌Will Chipman (Libertarian) 2.42%
Mississippi 3	Sonny Montgomery	Democratic	1966	Incumbent retired. Republican gain.	▌ ✓ Chip Pickering (Republican) 61.36%; ▌John Arthur Eaves Jr. (Democratic) 36.49%; ▌Lamen Clemons (Independent) 1.33%; ▌Charles Scarborough (Libertarian) 0.82%
Mississippi 4	Michael Parker	Republican	1988 (Note: Parker was originally elected as a Democrat. He switched parties in November 1995.)	Incumbent re-elected.	▌ ✓ Michael Parker (Republican) 61.22%; ▌Kevin Antoine (Democratic) 36.39%; ▌Kenneth Welch (Independence) 1.23%; Others: ▌Eileen Mahoney (Natural Law) 0.63%; ▌Bill Fausek (Libertarian) 0.52%
Mississippi 5	Gene Taylor	Democratic	1989	Incumbent re-elected.	▌ ✓ Gene Taylor (Democratic) 58.28%; ▌Dennis Dollar (Republican) 40.08%; ▌Le'Roy Carney (Independent) 1.03%; Others: ▌Dan E. Rogers (Libertarian) 0.27%; ▌Jordan Gollub (Independence) 0.24%; ▌Philip Mayeux (Natural Law) 0.10%

== Missouri ==
District	Incumbent			This race	
District	Representative	Party	First elected	Results	Candidates
Missouri 1	Bill Clay	Democratic	1968	Incumbent re-elected.	▌ ✓ Bill Clay (Democratic) 70.16%; ▌Daniel O'Sullivan (Republican) 27.63%; ▌Tamara Millay (Libertarian) 2.20%
Missouri 2	Jim Talent	Republican	1992	Incumbent re-elected.	▌ ✓ Jim Talent (Republican) 61.32%; ▌Joan Kelly Horn (Democratic) 37.08%; ▌Anton Stever (Libertarian) 1.01%; ▌Judith Clessler (Natural Law) 0.60%
Missouri 3	Dick Gephardt	Democratic	1976	Incumbent re-elected.	▌ ✓ Dick Gephardt (Democratic) 58.99%; ▌Debbie Wheelehan (Republican) 38.75%; ▌Michael Crist (Libertarian) 1.70%; ▌James Keersemaker (Natural Law) 0.55%
Missouri 4	Ike Skelton	Democratic	1976	Incumbent re-elected.	▌ ✓ Ike Skelton (Democratic) 63.78%; ▌Bill Phelps (Republican) 33.91%; ▌Ed Hoag (Libertarian) 2.31%
Missouri 5	Karen McCarthy	Democratic	1994	Incumbent re-elected.	▌ ✓ Karen McCarthy (Democratic) 67.40%; ▌Penny Bennett (Republican) 28.88%; ▌Kevin Hertel (Libertarian) 1.92%; ▌Tom Danaher (Natural Law) 1.79%
Missouri 6	Pat Danner	Democratic	1992	Incumbent re-elected.	▌ ✓ Pat Danner (Democratic) 68.62%; ▌Jeff Bailey (Republican) 29.26%; ▌Karl Wetzel (Libertarian) 2.12%
Missouri 7	Mel Hancock	Republican	1988	Incumbent retired. Republican hold.	▌ ✓ Roy Blunt (Republican) 64.87%; ▌Ruth Bamberger (Democratic) 31.65%; ▌Mike Harman (Libertarian) 2.61%; ▌Sharalyn Harris (Natural Law) 0.87%
Missouri 8	Bill Emerson	Republican	1980	Incumbent died June 22, 1996. Independent gain.	▌ ✓ Jo Ann Emerson (Independent) 50.47%; ▌Emily Firebaugh (Democratic) 37.28%; ▌Richard Kline (Republican) 10.53%; ▌Greg Tlapek (Libertarian) 1.12%; ▌David Zimmer (Natural Law) 0.59%
Missouri 9	Harold Volkmer	Democratic	1976	Incumbent lost re-election. Republican gain.	▌ ✓ Kenny Hulshof (Republican) 49.39%; ▌Harold Volkmer (Democratic) 47.03%; ▌Mitchell Moore (Libertarian) 2.85%; ▌Douglas Rexford (Natural Law) 0.73%

- Jo Ann Emerson was elected as a Republican in a special to serve the remaining months of the term and was elected as an independent caucusing with Republicans due to Missouri state law. She later switched to the Republican Party a few days after the start of the new Congress.

== Montana ==
District	Incumbent			This race	
District	Representative	Party	First elected	Results	Candidates
Montana at-large	Pat Williams	Democratic	1978	Incumbent retired. Republican gain.	▌ ✓ Rick Hill (Republican) 52.41%; ▌Bill Yellowtail (Democratic) 43.15%; ▌Jim Brooks (Natural Law) 4.43%

== Nebraska ==
District	Incumbent			This race	
District	Representative	Party	First elected	Results	Candidates
Nebraska 1	Doug Bereuter	Republican	1978	Incumbent re-elected.	▌ ✓ Doug Bereuter (Republican) 69.96%; ▌Patrick J. Combs (Democratic) 29.90%
Nebraska 2	Jon Christensen	Republican	1994	Incumbent re-elected.	▌ ✓ Jon Christensen (Republican) 56.82%; ▌James Martin Davis (Democratic) 40.14%; ▌Patricia Dunn (Natural Law) 1.98%; ▌Phillip Torrison (Libertarian) 0.87%
Nebraska 3	Bill Barrett	Republican	1990	Incumbent re-elected.	▌ ✓ Bill Barrett (Republican) 77.39%; ▌John Webster (Democratic) 22.53%

== Nevada ==
District	Incumbent			This race	
District	Representative	Party	First elected	Results	Candidates
Nevada 1	John Ensign	Republican	1994	Incumbent re-elected.	▌ ✓ John Ensign (Republican) 50%; ▌Bob Coffin (Democratic) 43.50%; ▌Ted Gunderson (Independent American) 2.65%; ▌James Dan (Libertarian) 1.94%; ▌Richard Eidson (Natural Law) 1.81%
Nevada 2	Barbara Vucanovich	Republican	1982	Incumbent retired. Republican hold.	▌ ✓ Jim Gibbons (Republican) 58.56%; ▌Thomas Wilson (Democratic) 35.26%; ▌Dan Hansen (Independent American) 3.17%; ▌Lois Avery (Libertarian) 1.67%; ▌Louis Tomburello (Libertarian) 1.35%

== New Hampshire ==
District	Incumbent			This race	
District	Representative	Party	First elected	Results	Candidates
New Hampshire 1	Bill Zeliff	Republican	1990	Incumbent retired to run for governor of New Hampshire. Republican hold.	▌ ✓ John E. Sununu (Republican) 50.03%; ▌Joe Keefe (Democratic) 46.61%; ▌Gary Flanders (Libertarian) 3.30%
New Hampshire 2	Charles Bass	Republican	1994	Incumbent re-elected.	▌ ✓ Charles Bass (Republican) 50.50%; ▌Deborah Arnesen (Democratic) 43.46%; ▌Carole Lamirande (Independent) 4.42%; ▌Roy Kendel (Independent American) 1.53%

== New Jersey ==
District	Incumbent			This race	
District	Representative	Party	First elected	Results	Candidates
New Jersey 1	Rob Andrews	Democratic	1990	Incumbent re-elected.	▌ ✓ Rob Andrews (Democratic) 76.12%; ▌Mel Suplee (Republican) 21.02%; ▌Michael Edmondson (Libertarian) 1.27%; Others: ▌Patricia Bily (Natural Law) 0.89%; ▌Norman Wahner (Independent) 0.71%
New Jersey 2	Frank LoBiondo	Republican	1994	Incumbent re-elected.	▌ ✓ Frank LoBiondo (Republican) 60.31%; ▌Ruth Katz (Democratic) 38.01%; Others: ▌David Headrick (Independent) 0.65%; ▌Judith Azaren (Natural Law) 0.53%; ▌Andrea Lippi (Independent) 0.49%
New Jersey 3	Jim Saxton	Republican	1984	Incumbent re-elected.	▌ ✓ Jim Saxton (Republican) 64.21%; ▌John Leonardi (Democratic) 33.26%; ▌Janice Presser (Libertarian) 1.24%; Others: ▌Agnes James (Conservative) 0.55%; ▌Eugene Ashworth (Natural Law) 0.46%; ▌Ken Feduniewicz (America First) 0.27%
New Jersey 4	Chris Smith	Republican	1980	Incumbent re-elected.	▌ ✓ Chris Smith (Republican) 63.62%; ▌Kevin Meara (Democratic) 33.71%; ▌Robert Figueroa (Independent) 1.30%; Others: ▌Morgan Strong (Conservative) 0.88%; ▌Arnold Kokans (Natural Law) 0.48%
New Jersey 5	Marge Roukema	Republican	1980	Incumbent re-elected.	▌ ✓ Marge Roukema (Republican) 71.29%; ▌Bill Auer (Democratic) 24.75%; ▌Lorraine La Neve (Conservative) 1.61%; Others: ▌Dan Karlan (Libertarian) 0.83%; ▌Helen Hamilton (Natural Law) 0.66%; ▌Barry Childers (Independent) 0.50%; ▌Gregory Kresge (Independent) 0.35%
New Jersey 6	Frank Pallone	Democratic	1988	Incumbent re-elected.	▌ ✓ Frank Pallone (Democratic) 61.25%; ▌Steven Corodemus (Republican) 36.07%; ▌Keith Quarles (Libertarian) 1.00%; Others: ▌Richard Sorrentino (Conservative) 0.74%; ▌Susan Normandin (Natural Law) 0.61%; ▌Stefanie Trice (Socialist Workers) 0.32%
New Jersey 7	Bob Franks	Republican	1992	Incumbent re-elected.	▌ ✓ Bob Franks (Republican) 55.39%; ▌Larry Lerner (Democratic) 41.83%; ▌Dorothy De Laura (Conservative) 1.75%; Others: ▌Nicholas Gentile (Natural Law) 0.73%; ▌Robert G. Robertson (Socialist Workers) 0.30%
New Jersey 8	Bill Martini	Republican	1994	Incumbent lost re-election. Democratic gain.	▌ ✓ Bill Pascrell (Democratic) 51.20%; ▌Bill Martini (Republican) 47.68%; ▌Jeffrey Levine (Natural Law) 0.84%
New Jersey 9	Robert Torricelli	Democratic	1982	Incumbent retired to run for U.S. senator. Democratic hold.	▌ ✓ Steve Rothman (Democratic) 55.77%; ▌Kathleen Donovan (Republican) 42.20%; ▌Arthur Rosen (Independent) 1.29%; ▌Leon Myerson (Libertarian) 0.73%
New Jersey 10	Donald M. Payne	Democratic	1988	Incumbent re-elected.	▌ ✓ Donald M. Payne (Democratic) 84.16%; ▌Vanessa Williams (Republican) 14.62%; Others: ▌Harley Tyler (Natural Law) 0.79%; ▌Toni Jackson (Socialist Workers) 0.43%
New Jersey 11	Rodney Frelinghuysen	Republican	1994	Incumbent re-elected.	▌ ✓ Rodney Frelinghuysen (Republican) 66.27%; ▌Chris Evangel (Democratic) 30.86%; ▌Ed De Mott (Conservative) 1.12%; ▌Austin Lett (Libertarian) 1.03%; ▌Victoria Spruiell (Natural Law) 0.72%
New Jersey 12	Dick Zimmer	Republican	1990	Incumbent retired to run for U.S. senator. Republican hold.	▌ ✓ Mike Pappas (Republican) 50.45%; ▌David Del Vecchio (Democratic) 46.65%; ▌Virginia Flynn (Libertarian) 1.47%; Others: ▌Joseph Mercurio (Conservative) 0.98%; ▌Philip Cenicola (Natural Law) 0.45%
New Jersey 13	Bob Menendez	Democratic	1992	Incumbent re-elected.	▌ ✓ Bob Menendez (Democratic) 78.83%; ▌Carlos Munoz (Republican) 17.36%; ▌Herbert Shaw (Independent) 1.46%; ▌Mike Buoncristiano (Libertarian) 1.43%; Others: ▌William Estrada (Socialist Workers) 0.49%; ▌Rupert Ravens (Natural Law) 0.43%

== New Mexico ==
District	Incumbent			This race	
District	Representative	Party	First elected	Results	Candidates
New Mexico 1	Steven Schiff	Republican	1988	Incumbent re-elected.	▌ ✓ Steven Schiff (Republican) 56.60%; ▌John Wertheim (Democratic) 37.10%; ▌John Uhrich (Green) 3.98%; ▌Betty Turrietta-Koury (Independent) 2.31%
New Mexico 2	Joe Skeen	Republican	1980	Incumbent re-elected.	▌ ✓ Joe Skeen (Republican) 55.93%; ▌Shirley Baca (Democratic) 44.07%
New Mexico 3	Bill Richardson	Democratic	1982	Incumbent re-elected.	▌ ✓ Bill Richardson (Democratic) 67.25%; ▌Bill Redmond (Republican) 30.54%; ▌Ed Nagel (Libertarian) 2.21%

== New York ==
District	Incumbent			This race	
District	Representative	Party	First elected	Results	Candidates
New York 1	Michael Forbes	Republican	1994	Incumbent re-elected.	▌ ✓ Michael Forbes (Republican) 54.72%; ▌Nora Bredes (Democratic) 45.28%
New York 2	Rick Lazio	Republican	1992	Incumbent re-elected.	▌ ✓ Rick Lazio (Republican) 64.23%; ▌Kenneth Herman (Democratic) 33.19%; ▌Alice Cort Ross (Right to Life) 2.58%
New York 3	Peter King	Republican	1992	Incumbent re-elected.	▌ ✓ Peter King (Republican) 55.30%; ▌Dal Lamagna (Democratic) 42.14%; ▌John O'Shea (Right to Life) 1.78%; ▌John A. DePrima (Libertarian) 0.78%
New York 4	Dan Frisa	Republican	1994	Incumbent lost re-election. Democratic gain.	▌ ✓ Carolyn McCarthy (Democratic) 57.49%; ▌Dan Frisa (Republican) 40.51%; ▌Vincent P. Garbitelli (Right to Life) 1.47%; ▌Robert S. Berkowitz (Libertarian) 0.52%
New York 5	Gary Ackerman	Democratic	1983	Incumbent re-elected.	▌ ✓ Gary Ackerman (Democratic) 63.66%; ▌Grant M. Lally (Republican) 35.01%; ▌Andrew Duff (Right to Life) 1.33%
New York 6	Floyd Flake	Democratic	1986	Incumbent re-elected.	▌ ✓ Floyd Flake (Democratic) 84.85%; ▌Jorawar Misir (Republican) 15.14%
New York 7	Thomas Manton	Democratic	1984	Incumbent re-elected.	▌ ✓ Thomas Manton (Democratic) 71.07%; ▌Rose Birtley (Republican) 28.93%
New York 8	Jerry Nadler	Democratic	1992	Incumbent re-elected.	▌ ✓ Jerry Nadler (Democratic) 82.28%; ▌Michael Benjamin (Republican) 16.23%; ▌George Galip (Conservative) 1.48%
New York 9	Chuck Schumer	Democratic	1980	Incumbent re-elected.	▌ ✓ Chuck Schumer (Democratic) 74.79%; ▌Robert Verga (Republican) 21.29%; ▌Michael Mossa (Conservative) 3.92%
New York 10	Edolphus Towns	Democratic	1982	Incumbent re-elected.	▌ ✓ Edolphus Towns (Democratic) 91.27%; ▌Amelia Smith-Parker (Republican) 7.91%; ▌Julian Hill (Right to Life) 0.82%
New York 11	Major Owens	Democratic	1982	Incumbent re-elected.	▌ ✓ Major Owens (Democratic) 91.95%; ▌Claudette Hayle (Republican) 8.04%
New York 12	Nydia Velázquez	Democratic	1992	Incumbent re-elected.	▌ ✓ Nydia Velázquez (Democratic) 84.61%; ▌Miguel Prado (Republican) 13.64%; ▌Eleanor Garcia (Socialist Workers) 1.75%
New York 13	Susan Molinari	Republican	1990	Incumbent re-elected.	▌ ✓ Susan Molinari (Republican) 61.56%; ▌Tyrone G. Butler (Democratic) 34.71%; ▌Kathleen Marciano (Right to Life) 2.21%; ▌Anita Lerman (Independence) 1.52%
New York 14	Carolyn Maloney	Democratic	1992	Incumbent re-elected.	▌ ✓ Carolyn Maloney (Democratic) 72.42%; ▌Jeffrey Livingston (Republican) 23.72%; ▌Thomas Leighton (Green) 1.95%; ▌Joseph Lavezzo (Conservative) 1.22%; ▌Delco Cornett (Right to Life) 0.68%
New York 15	Charles Rangel	Democratic	1970	Incumbent re-elected.	▌ ✓ Charles Rangel (Democratic) 91.31%; ▌Edward Adams (Republican) 4.77%; ▌Ruben Vargas (Conservative) 3.12%; ▌Jose Augustin Suero (Right to Life) 0.79%
New York 16	José E. Serrano	Democratic	1990	Incumbent re-elected.	▌ ✓ José E. Serrano (Democratic) 96.31%; ▌Rodney Torres (Republican) 2.90%; ▌Owen Camp (Conservative) 0.79%
New York 17	Eliot Engel	Democratic	1988	Incumbent re-elected.	▌ ✓ Eliot Engel (Democratic) 84.98%; ▌Denis McCarthy (Republican) 13.33%; ▌Dennis Coleman (Independence) 1.68%
New York 18	Nita Lowey	Democratic	1988	Incumbent re-elected.	▌ ✓ Nita Lowey (Democratic) 63.64%; ▌Kerry Katsorhis (Republican) 32.03%; ▌Concetta Ferrara (Independence) 2.31%; ▌Florence T. O'Grady (Right to Life) 2.02%
New York 19	Sue Kelly	Republican	1994	Incumbent re-elected.	▌ ✓ Sue Kelly (Republican) 46.30%; ▌Richard Klein (Democratic) 39.40%; ▌Joe DioGuardi (Conservative) 12.43%; ▌William Haase (Independence) 1.86%
New York 20	Benjamin Gilman	Republican	1972	Incumbent re-elected.	▌ ✓ Benjamin Gilman (Republican) 57.07%; ▌Yash Aggarwal (Democratic) 37.63%; ▌Robert Garrison (Right to Life) 2.96%; ▌Ira Goodman (Independence) 2.34%
New York 21	Michael McNulty	Democratic	1988	Incumbent re-elected.	▌ ✓ Michael McNulty (Democratic) 66.10%; ▌Nancy Norman (Republican) 26.89%; ▌Lee Wasserman (Libertarian) 7.00%
New York 22	Gerald Solomon	Republican	1978	Incumbent re-elected.	▌ ✓ Gerald Solomon (Republican) 60.48%; ▌Steve James (Democratic) 39.52%
New York 23	Sherwood Boehlert	Republican	1982	Incumbent re-elected.	▌ ✓ Sherwood Boehlert (Republican) 64.34%; ▌Bruce Hapanowicz (Democratic) 26.04%; ▌Thomas Loughlin (Independence) 5.59%; ▌William Tapley (Right to Life) 4.02%
New York 24	John M. McHugh	Republican	1992	Incumbent re-elected.	▌ ✓ John M. McHugh (Republican) 71.12%; ▌Donald R. Ravenscroft (Democratic) 25.01%; ▌William Beaumont (Independence) 3.86%
New York 25	James T. Walsh	Republican	1988	Incumbent re-elected.	▌ ✓ James T. Walsh (Republican) 55.11%; ▌Marty Mack (Democratic) 44.89%
New York 26	Maurice Hinchey	Democratic	1992	Incumbent re-elected.	▌ ✓ Maurice Hinchey (Democratic) 55.21%; ▌Sue Wittig (Republican) 42.30%; ▌Douglas Drazen (Independence) 2.48%
New York 27	Bill Paxon	Republican	1988	Incumbent re-elected.	▌ ✓ Bill Paxon (Republican) 59.88%; ▌Thomas Fricano (Democratic) 40.12%
New York 28	Louise Slaughter	Democratic	1986	Incumbent re-elected.	▌ ✓ Louise Slaughter (Democratic) 57.25%; ▌Geoff Rosenberger (Republican) 42.75%
New York 29	John LaFalce	Democratic	1974	Incumbent re-elected.	▌ ✓ John LaFalce (Democratic) 61.99%; ▌David Callard (Republican) 38.01%
New York 30	Jack Quinn	Republican	1992	Incumbent re-elected.	▌ ✓ Jack Quinn (Republican) 54.82%; ▌Francis Pordum (Democratic) 45.18%
New York 31	Amo Houghton	Republican	1986	Incumbent re-elected.	▌ ✓ Amo Houghton (Republican) 71.56%; ▌Bruce Mac Bain (Democratic) 25.35%; ▌Le Roy Wilson (Right to Life) 3.09%

== North Carolina ==
District	Incumbent			This race	
District	Representative	Party	First elected	Results	Candidates
North Carolina 1	Eva Clayton	Democratic	1992	Incumbent re-elected.	▌ ✓ Eva Clayton (Democratic) 65.90%; ▌Ted Tyler (Republican) 33.12%; Others: ▌Todd Murphrey (Libertarian) 0.65%; ▌Joseph Boxerman (Natural Law) 0.32%
North Carolina 2	David Funderburk	Republican	1994	Incumbent lost re-election. Democratic gain.	▌ ✓ Bob Etheridge (Democratic) 52.54%; ▌David Funderburk (Republican) 45.68%; ▌Mark D. Jackson (Libertarian) 1.34%; ▌Robert Argy (Natural Law) 0.44%
North Carolina 3	Walter B. Jones Jr.	Republican	1994	Incumbent re-elected.	▌ ✓ Walter B. Jones Jr. (Republican) 62.66%; ▌George Parrott (Democratic) 36.53%; ▌Jon Williams (Natural Law) 0.81%
North Carolina 4	Fred Heineman	Republican	1994	Incumbent lost re-election. Democratic gain.	▌ ✓ David Price (Democratic) 54.39%; ▌Fred Heineman (Republican) 43.76%; ▌David Allen Walker (Libertarian) 1.43%; ▌Russell Wollman (Natural Law) 0.42%
North Carolina 5	Richard Burr	Republican	1994	Incumbent re-elected.	▌ ✓ Richard Burr (Republican) 62.08%; ▌Neil Cashion (Democratic) 35.44%; ▌Barbara Howe (Libertarian) 2.00%; ▌Craig Berg (Natural Law) 0.48%
North Carolina 6	Howard Coble	Republican	1984	Incumbent re-elected.	▌ ✓ Howard Coble (Republican) 72.43%; ▌Mark Costley (Democratic) 25.39%; ▌Gary Goodson (Libertarian) 1.18%
North Carolina 7	Charlie Rose	Democratic	1972	Incumbent retired. Democratic hold.	▌ ✓ Mike McIntyre (Democratic) 52.88%; ▌Bill Caster (Republican) 45.82%; Others: ▌Chris Nubel (Libertarian) 0.95%; ▌Garrison Frantz (Natural Law) 0.34%
North Carolina 8	Bill Hefner	Democratic	1974	Incumbent re-elected.	▌ ✓ Bill Hefner (Democratic) 55.18%; ▌Curtis Blackwood (Republican) 43.70%; ▌Thomas Carlisle (Natural Law) 1.12%
North Carolina 9	Sue Myrick	Republican	1994	Incumbent re-elected.	▌ ✓ Sue Myrick (Republican) 62.95%; ▌Mike Daisley (Democratic) 35.40%; Others: ▌David Knight (Libertarian) 0.97%; ▌Jeannine Austin (Natural Law) 0.64%
North Carolina 10	Cass Ballenger	Republican	1986	Incumbent re-elected.	▌ ✓ Cass Ballenger (Republican) 69.98%; ▌Ben Neill (Democratic) 28.73%; ▌Richard Kahn (Natural Law) 1.28%
North Carolina 11	Charles Taylor	Republican	1990	Incumbent re-elected	▌ ✓ Charles Taylor (Republican) 58.26%; ▌James Mark Ferguson (Democratic) 40.02%; ▌Phil McCanless (Libertarian) 1.01%; ▌Milton Burrill (Natural Law) 0.70%
North Carolina 12	Mel Watt	Democratic	1992	Incumbent re-elected.	▌ ✓ Mel Watt (Democratic) 71.49%; ▌Joe Martino (Republican) 26.71%; ▌Roger Kohn (Libertarian) 1.07%; ▌Walter Lewis (Natural Law) 0.73%

== North Dakota ==
District	Incumbent			This race	
District	Representative	Party	First elected	Results	Candidates
North Dakota at-large	Earl Pomeroy	Democratic-NPL	1992	Incumbent re-elected.	▌ ✓ Earl Pomeroy (Democratic-NPL) 55.07%; ▌Kevin Cramer (Republican) 43.22%; ▌Kenneth Loughead (Independent) 1.71%

== Ohio ==
District	Incumbent			This race	
District	Representative	Party	First elected	Results	Candidates
Ohio 1	Steve Chabot	Republican	1994	Incumbent re-elected.	▌ ✓ Steve Chabot (Republican) 54.17%; ▌Mark Longabaugh (Democratic) 43.36%; ▌John Halley (Natural Law) 2.46%
Ohio 2	Rob Portman	Republican	1993	Incumbent re-elected.	▌ ✓ Rob Portman (Republican) 72.01%; ▌Thomas R. Chandler (Democratic) 22.36%; ▌Kathleen McKnight (Natural Law) 5.36%
Ohio 3	Tony P. Hall	Democratic	1978	Incumbent re-elected.	▌ ✓ Tony P. Hall (Democratic) 63.64%; ▌David Westbrock (Republican) 33.33%; ▌Dorothy Mackey (Natural Law) 2.24%
Ohio 4	Mike Oxley	Republican	1981	Incumbent re-elected.	▌ ✓ Mike Oxley (Republican) 64.81%; ▌Paul McClain (Democratic) 30.34%; ▌Michael McCaffery (Natural Law) 4.85%
Ohio 5	Paul Gillmor	Republican	1988	Incumbent re-elected.	▌ ✓ Paul Gillmor (Republican) 61.13%; ▌Annie Saunders (Democratic) 34.06%; ▌David Schaffer (Natural Law) 4.81%
Ohio 6	Frank Cremeans	Republican	1994	Incumbent lost re-election. Democratic gain.	▌ ✓ Ted Strickland (Democratic) 51.32%; ▌Frank Cremeans (Republican) 48.67%
Ohio 7	Dave Hobson	Republican	1990	Incumbent re-elected.	▌ ✓ Dave Hobson (Republican) 67.85%; ▌Richard Blain (Democratic) 26.36%; ▌Dawn Johnson (Natural Law) 5.78%
Ohio 8	John Boehner	Republican	1990	Incumbent re-elected.	▌ ✓ John Boehner (Republican) 70.28%; ▌Jeffrey Kitchen (Democratic) 26.07%; ▌William Baker (Natural Law) 3.65%
Ohio 9	Marcy Kaptur	Democratic	1982	Incumbent re-elected.	▌ ✓ Marcy Kaptur (Democratic) 81%; ▌Randy Whitman (Republican) 20.80%; ▌Elizabeth Slotnick (Natural Law) 2.11%
Ohio 10	Martin Hoke	Republican	1992	Incumbent lost re-election. Democratic gain.	▌ ✓ Dennis Kucinich (Democratic) 49.06%; ▌Martin Hoke (Republican) 46.32%; ▌Robert Iverson (Natural Law) 4.61%
Ohio 11	Louis Stokes	Democratic	1968	Incumbent re-elected.	▌ ✓ Louis Stokes (Democratic) 81.22%; ▌James Sykora (Republican) 15.25%; ▌Sonja Glavina (Natural Law) 3.52%
Ohio 12	John Kasich	Republican	1982	Incumbent re-elected.	▌ ✓ John Kasich (Republican) 63.88%; ▌Cynthia Ruccia (Democratic) 33.17%; ▌Barbara Edelman (Natural Law) 2.95%
Ohio 13	Sherrod Brown	Democratic	1992	Incumbent re-elected.	▌ ✓ Sherrod Brown (Democratic) 60.49%; ▌Kenneth Blair (Republican) 35.92%; ▌David Kluter (Natural Law) 3.59%
Ohio 14	Tom Sawyer	Democratic	1986	Incumbent re-elected.	▌ ✓ Tom Sawyer (Democratic) 54.34%; ▌Joyce George (Republican) 41.72%; ▌Terry Wilkinson (Natural Law) 3.93%
Ohio 15	Deborah Pryce	Republican	1992	Incumbent re-elected.	▌ ✓ Deborah Pryce (Republican) 70.80%; ▌Cliff Arnebeck (Democratic) 29.20%
Ohio 16	Ralph Regula	Republican	1972	Incumbent re-elected.	▌ ✓ Ralph Regula (Republican) 68.72%; ▌Thomas Burkhart (Democratic) 28.00%; ▌Brad Graef (Natural Law) 3.28%
Ohio 17	James Traficant	Democratic	1984	Incumbent re-elected.	▌ ✓ James Traficant (Democratic) 90.96%; ▌James Cahaney (Natural Law) 9.04%
Ohio 18	Bob Ney	Republican	1994	Incumbent re-elected.	▌ ✓ Bob Ney (Republican) 50.19%; ▌Rob Burch (Democratic) 46.33%; ▌Margaret Chitti (Natural Law) 3.48%
Ohio 19	Steve LaTourette	Republican	1994	Incumbent re-elected.	▌ ✓ Steve LaTourette (Republican) 54.70%; ▌Thomas Coyne (Democratic) 40.98%; ▌Thomas A. Martin (Natural Law) 4.32%

== Oklahoma ==
District	Incumbent			This race	
District	Representative	Party	First elected	Results	Candidates
Oklahoma 1	Steve Largent	Republican	1994	Incumbent re-elected.	▌ ✓ Steve Largent (Republican) 68.16%; ▌Randolph Amen (Democratic) 27.56%; ▌Karla Condray (Independent) 4.28%
Oklahoma 2	Tom Coburn	Republican	1994	Incumbent re-elected.	▌ ✓ Tom Coburn (Republican) 55.47%; ▌Glen D. Johnson Jr. (Democratic) 44.53%
Oklahoma 3	Bill Brewster	Democratic	1990	Incumbent retired. Republican gain.	▌ ✓ Wes Watkins (Republican) 51.45%; ▌Darryl Roberts (Democratic) 45.24%; ▌Scott Demaree (Independent) 3.31%
Oklahoma 4	J. C. Watts	Republican	1994	Incumbent re-elected.	▌ ✓ J. C. Watts (Republican) 57.68%; ▌Ed Crocker (Democratic) 39.89%; ▌Robert T. Murphy (Independent) 2.43%
Oklahoma 5	Ernest Istook	Republican	1992	Incumbent re-elected.	▌ ✓ Ernest Istook (Republican) 69.72%; ▌James Forsythe (Democratic) 27.07%; ▌Ava Kennedy (Independent) 3.21%
Oklahoma 6	Frank Lucas	Republican	1994	Incumbent re-elected.	▌ ✓ Frank Lucas (Republican) 63.88%; ▌Paul Barby (Democratic) 36.12%

== Oregon ==
District	Incumbent			This race	
District	Representative	Party	First elected	Results	Candidates
Oregon 1	Elizabeth Furse	Democratic	1992	Incumbent re-elected.	▌ ✓ Elizabeth Furse (Democratic) 51.90%; ▌Bill Witt (Republican) 45.28%; ▌Richard Johnson (Libertarian) 2.26%; ▌David Princ (Socialist) 0.41%
Oregon 2	Wes Cooley	Republican	1994	Incumbent retired. Republican hold.	▌ ✓ Bob Smith (Republican) 61.66%; ▌Mike Dugan (Democratic) 36.53%; ▌Frank Wise (Libertarian) 1.72%
Oregon 3	Earl Blumenauer	Democratic	1996	Incumbent re-elected.	▌ ✓ Earl Blumenauer (Democratic) 66.93%; ▌Scott Bruun (Republican) 26.32%; ▌Joe Keating (Green) 3.74%; ▌Bruce Knight (Libertarian) 1.80%; ▌Victoria Guillebeau (Socialist) 0.99%
Oregon 4	Peter DeFazio	Democratic	1986	Incumbent re-elected.	▌ ✓ Peter DeFazio (Democratic) 65.69%; ▌John Newkirk (Republican) 28.40%; ▌Tonie Nathan (Libertarian) 1.82%; ▌Bill Bonville (Reform) 1.47%; Others: ▌David Duemler (Socialist) 0.51%; ▌Allan Opus (Green) 0.48%
Oregon 5	Jim Bunn	Republican	1994	Incumbent lost re-election. Democratic gain.	▌ ✓ Darlene Hooley (Democratic) 51.17%; ▌Jim Bunn (Republican) 46.00%; ▌Lawrence Duquesne (Libertarian) 1.90%; ▌Trey Smith (Socialist) 0.78%

== Pennsylvania ==
District	Incumbent			This race	
District	Representative	Party	First elected	Results	Candidates
Pennsylvania 1	Thomas M. Foglietta	Democratic	1980	Incumbent re-elected.	▌ ✓ Thomas M. Foglietta (Democratic) 87.50%; ▌James Cella (Republican) 12.49%
Pennsylvania 2	Chaka Fattah	Democratic	1994	Incumbent re-elected.	▌ ✓ Chaka Fattah (Democratic) 87.99%; ▌Larry Murphy (Republican) 12.01%
Pennsylvania 3	Robert Borski	Democratic	1982	Incumbent re-elected.	▌ ✓ Robert Borski (Democratic) 68.90%; ▌Joseph McColgan (Republican) 31.10%
Pennsylvania 4	Ron Klink	Democratic	1992	Incumbent re-elected.	▌ ✓ Ron Klink (Democratic) 64.20%; ▌Paul Adametz (Republican) 35.76%
Pennsylvania 5	William Clinger	Republican	1978	Incumbent retired. Republican hold.	▌ ✓ John Peterson (Republican) 60.26%; ▌Ruth Rudy (Democratic) 39.70%
Pennsylvania 6	Tim Holden	Democratic	1992	Incumbent re-elected.	▌ ✓ Tim Holden (Democratic) 58.55%; ▌Christian Leinbach (Republican) 40.70%; ▌Thomas List (Natural Law) 0.75%
Pennsylvania 7	Curt Weldon	Republican	1986	Incumbent re-elected.	▌ ✓ Curt Weldon (Republican) 66.93%; ▌John Innelli (Democratic) 32.38%; ▌John Pronchik (Natural Law) 0.68%
Pennsylvania 8	Jim Greenwood	Republican	1992	Incumbent re-elected.	▌ ✓ Jim Greenwood (Republican) 59.10%; ▌John Murray (Democratic) 35.28%; ▌Richard Piotrowski (Libertarian) 3.09%; ▌David Booth (Constitution) 2.52%
Pennsylvania 9	Bud Shuster	Republican	1972	Incumbent re-elected.	▌ ✓ Bud Shuster (Republican) 73.70%; ▌Monte Kemmler (Democratic) 26.27%
Pennsylvania 10	Joe McDade	Republican	1962	Incumbent re-elected.	▌ ✓ Joe McDade (Republican) 59.78%; ▌Joe Cullen (Democratic) 36.22%; ▌Thomas McLaughlin (Reform) 3.98%
Pennsylvania 11	Paul Kanjorski	Democratic	1984	Incumbent re-elected.	▌ ✓ Paul Kanjorski (Democratic) 68.00%; ▌Stephen Urban (Republican) 31.99%
Pennsylvania 12	John Murtha	Democratic	1974	Incumbent re-elected.	▌ ✓ John Murtha (Democratic) 69.99%; ▌Bill Choby (Republican) 30.00%
Pennsylvania 13	Jon D. Fox	Republican	1994	Incumbent re-elected.	▌ ✓ Jon D. Fox (Republican) 48.91%; ▌Joe Hoeffel (Democratic) 48.87%; ▌Thomas Burke (Libertarian) 2.00%
Pennsylvania 14	William J. Coyne	Democratic	1980	Incumbent re-elected.	▌ ✓ William J. Coyne (Democratic) 60.68%; ▌Bill Ravotti (Republican) 38.96%; ▌Paul Scherrer (Socialist Equality) 0.35%
Pennsylvania 15	Paul McHale	Democratic	1992	Incumbent re-elected.	▌ ✓ Paul McHale (Democratic) 54.81%; ▌Bob Kilbanks (Republican) 41.33%; ▌Nicholas Sabatine (Reform) 3.46%; ▌Philip Faust (Natural Law) 0.40%
Pennsylvania 16	Bob Walker	Republican	1976	Incumbent retired. Republican hold.	▌ ✓ Joe Pitts (Republican) 59.40%; ▌James Blaine (Democratic) 37.50%; ▌Robert Yorczyk (Reform) 3.09%
Pennsylvania 17	George Gekas	Republican	1982	Incumbent re-elected.	▌ ✓ George Gekas (Republican) 72.23%; ▌Paul Kettl (Democratic) 27.76%
Pennsylvania 18	Mike Doyle	Democratic	1994	Incumbent re-elected.	▌ ✓ Mike Doyle (Democratic) 56.01%; ▌David Fawcett (Republican) 40.39%; ▌Richard E. Caligiuri (Independent) 3.19%; ▌Ralph Emmerich (Natural Law) 0.41%
Pennsylvania 19	Bill Goodling	Republican	1974	Incumbent re-elected.	▌ ✓ Bill Goodling (Republican) 62.55%; ▌Scott Chronister (Democratic) 35.86%; ▌Francis Worley (Independent) 1.53%
Pennsylvania 20	Frank Mascara	Democratic	1994	Incumbent re-elected.	▌ ✓ Frank Mascara (Democratic) 53.89%; ▌Mike McCormick (Republican) 46.10%
Pennsylvania 21	Phil English	Republican	1994	Incumbent re-elected.	▌ ✓ Phil English (Republican) 50.68%; ▌Ron DiNicola (Democratic) 49.32%

== Rhode Island ==
District	Incumbent			This race	
District	Representative	Party	First elected	Results	Candidates
Rhode Island 1	Patrick J. Kennedy	Democratic	1994	Incumbent re-elected.	▌ ✓ Patrick J. Kennedy (Democratic) 69.42%; ▌Giovanni Cicione (Republican) 28.04%; Others: ▌Michael Rollins (Independent) 0.99%; ▌Graham Schwass (Green) 0.80%; ▌Gregory Raposa (Independent) 0.74%
Rhode Island 2	Jack Reed	Democratic	1990	Incumbent retired to run for U.S. senator. Democratic hold.	▌ ✓ Robert Weygand (Democratic) 64.47%; ▌Richard Wild (Republican) 31.72%; ▌Thomas Ricci (Independent) 1.70%; ▌Gail Casman (Independent) 1.19%; ▌Jack Potter (Independent) 0.92%

== South Carolina ==
District	Incumbent			This race	
District	Representative	Party	First elected	Results	Candidates
South Carolina 1	Mark Sanford	Republican	1994	Incumbent re-elected.	▌ ✓ Mark Sanford (Republican) 96.36%; ▌Joseph Innella (Natural Law) 3.55%
South Carolina 2	Floyd Spence	Republican	1970	Incumbent re-elected.	▌ ✓ Floyd Spence (Republican) 89.76%; ▌Maurice Raiford (Natural Law) 10.05%
South Carolina 3	Lindsey Graham	Republican	1994	Incumbent re-elected.	▌ ✓ Lindsey Graham (Republican) 60.29%; ▌Debbie Dorn (Democratic) 38.73%; ▌Linda Pennington (Natural Law) 0.97%
South Carolina 4	Bob Inglis	Republican	1992	Incumbent re-elected.	▌ ✓ Bob Inglis (Republican) 70.92%; ▌Darrell Curry (Democratic) 27.78%; ▌Faye Walters (Natural Law) 1.28%
South Carolina 5	John Spratt	Democratic	1982	Incumbent re-elected.	▌ ✓ John Spratt (Democratic) 54.08%; ▌Larry Bigham (Republican) 45.26%; ▌P. G. Joshi (Natural Law) 0.64%
South Carolina 6	Jim Clyburn	Democratic	1992	Incumbent re-elected.	▌ ✓ Jim Clyburn (Democratic) 69.41%; ▌Gary McLeod (Republican) 30.03%; ▌Savita Joshi (Natural Law) 0.55%

== South Dakota ==
District	Incumbent			This race	
District	Representative	Party	First elected	Results	Candidates
South Dakota at-large	Tim Johnson	Democratic	1986	Incumbent retired to run for U.S. senator. Republican gain.	▌ ✓ John Thune (Republican) 57.67%; ▌Rick Weiland (Democratic) 36.99%; ▌Stacey Nelson (Independent) 3.22%; ▌Kurt Evans (Independent) 2.12%

== Tennessee ==
District	Incumbent			This race	
District	Representative	Party	First elected	Results	Candidates
Tennessee 1	Jimmy Quillen	Republican	1962	Incumbent retired. Republican hold.	▌ ✓ Bill Jenkins (Republican) 64.76%; ▌Kay Smith (Democratic) 32.28%; ▌Dave Davis (Independent) 1.07%; Others: ▌James B. Taylor (Independent) 0.60%; ▌Bill Bull Durham (Independent) 0.49%; ▌John Curtis (Independent) 0.34%; ▌Mike Fugate (Independent) 0.24%; ▌Paul Schmidt (Independent) 0.20%
Tennessee 2	Jimmy Duncan	Republican	1988	Incumbent re-elected.	▌ ✓ Jimmy Duncan (Republican) 70.68%; ▌Stephen Smith (Democratic) 28.57%; Others: ▌Chris Dimit (Independent) 0.61%; ▌George Njezic (Independent) 0.14%
Tennessee 3	Zach Wamp	Republican	1994	Incumbent re-elected.	▌ ✓ Zach Wamp (Republican) 56.30%; ▌Chuck Jolly (Democratic) 42.55%; Others: ▌William Cole (Independent) 0.50%; ▌Walt Ward (Independent) 0.36%; ▌Thomas Morrell (Independent) 0.15%; ▌Dick Sims (Independent) 0.14%
Tennessee 4	Van Hilleary	Republican	1994	Incumbent re-elected.	▌ ✓ Van Hilleary (Republican) 57.90%; ▌Mark Stewart (Democratic) 41.18%; ▌Patrick Lyons (Independent) 0.60%; ▌Preston Spaulding (Independent) 0.32%
Tennessee 5	Bob Clement	Democratic	1988	Incumbent re-elected.	▌ ✓ Bob Clement (Democratic) 72.38%; ▌Steven Edmondson (Republican) 23.84%; ▌Mike Childers (Independent) 3.78%
Tennessee 6	Bart Gordon	Democratic	1984	Incumbent re-elected.	▌ ✓ Bart Gordon (Democratic) 54.42%; ▌Steve Gill (Republican) 41.57%; ▌Jim Coffer (Independent) 4.01%
Tennessee 7	Ed Bryant	Republican	1994	Incumbent re-elected.	▌ ✓ Ed Bryant (Republican) 65.42%; ▌Don Trotter (Democratic) 33.30%; ▌Steven Romer (Independent) 1.28%
Tennessee 8	John Tanner	Democratic	1988	Incumbent re-elected.	▌ ✓ John Tanner (Democratic) 67.26%; ▌Tom Watson (Republican) 29.92%; ▌Donna Malone (Independent) 2.62%
Tennessee 9	Harold Ford Sr.	Democratic	1974	Incumbent retired. Democratic hold.	▌ ✓ Harold Ford Jr. (Democratic) 61.10%; ▌Rod DeBerry (Republican) 37.26%; ▌Silky Sullivan (Independent) 0.50%

== Texas ==
District	Incumbent			This race	
District	Representative	Party	First elected	Results	Candidates
Texas 1	Jim Chapman	Democratic	1985	Incumbent retired to run for U.S. senator. Democratic hold.	▌ ✓ Max Sandlin (Democratic) 51.56%; ▌Ed Merritt (Republican) 46.75%; ▌Margaret Palms (Natural Law) 1.69%
Texas 2	Charles Wilson	Democratic	1972	Incumbent retired. Democratic hold.	▌ ✓ Jim Turner (Democratic) 52.24%; ▌Brian Babin (Republican) 45.61%; ▌Henry McCullough (Independent) 1.21%; Others: ▌David Constant (Libertarian) 0.63%; ▌Gary Hardy (Natural Law) 0.30%
Texas 3	Sam Johnson	Republican	1991	Incumbent re-elected.	▌ ✓ Sam Johnson (Republican) 72.98%; ▌Lee Cole (Democratic) 24.43%; ▌John E. Davis (Libertarian) 2.59%
Texas 4	Ralph Hall	Democratic	1980	Incumbent re-elected.	▌ ✓ Ralph Hall (Democratic) 63.77%; ▌Jerry Hall (Republican) 34.30%; ▌Steven Rothacker (Libertarian) 1.53%; ▌Enos Denham (Natural Law) 0.39%
Texas 5	John Bryant	Democratic	1982	Incumbent retired to run for U.S. senator. Republican gain.	▌ ✓ Pete Sessions (Republican) 53.07%; ▌John Pouland (Democratic) 46.93%
Texas 6	Joe Barton	Republican	1984	Incumbent re-elected.	▌ ✓ Joe Barton (Republican) 77.12%; ▌Skeet Richardson (Independent) 12.81%; ▌Catherine Anderson (Libertarian) 6.93%; ▌Doug Williams (US Taxpayers) 3.14%
Texas 7	Bill Archer	Republican	1970	Incumbent re-elected.	▌ ✓ Bill Archer (Republican) 81.37%; ▌Al Siegmund (Democratic) 15.09%; ▌Gene Hsiao (Independent) 2.08%; ▌Randy Sims (Independent) 1.46%
Texas 8	Jack Fields	Republican	1980	Incumbent retired. Republican hold.	▌ ✓ Kevin Brady (Republican) 59.11%; ▌Gene Fontenot (Republican) 40.89%
Texas 9	Steve Stockman	Republican	1994	Incumbent lost re-election. Democratic gain.	▌ ✓ Nick Lampson (Democratic) 52.83%; ▌Steve Stockman (Republican) 47.16%
Texas 10	Lloyd Doggett	Democratic	1994	Incumbent re-elected.	▌ ✓ Lloyd Doggett (Democratic) 56.20%; ▌Teresa Doggett (Republican) 41.36%; ▌Gary Johnson (Libertarian) 1.68%; ▌Steve Klayman (Natural Law) 0.75%
Texas 11	Chet Edwards	Democratic	1990	Incumbent re-elected.	▌ ✓ Chet Edwards (Democratic) 56.83%; ▌Jay Mathis (Republican) 42.37%; ▌Ken Hardin (Natural Law) 0.79%
Texas 12	Pete Geren	Democratic	1989	Incumbent retired. Republican gain.	▌ ✓ Kay Granger (Republican) 57.78%; ▌Hugh Parmer (Democratic) 41.04%; ▌Heather Proffer (Natural Law) 1.17%
Texas 13	Mac Thornberry	Republican	1994	Incumbent re-elected.	▌ ✓ Mac Thornberry (Republican) 66.87%; ▌Samuel Silverman (Democratic) 32.29%; ▌Don Harkey (Natural Law) 0.84%
Texas 14	Greg Laughlin	Republican	1988	Incumbent lost renomination. Republican hold.	▌ ✓ Ron Paul (Republican) 51.08%; ▌Lefty Morris (Democratic) 47.62%; ▌Ed Fasanella (Natural Law) 1.30%
Texas 15	Kika de la Garza	Democratic	1964	Incumbent retired. Democratic hold.	▌ ✓ Rubén Hinojosa (Democratic) 62.30%; ▌Tom Haughey (Republican) 36.74%; ▌Rob Wofford (Natural Law) 0.96%
Texas 16	Ron Coleman	Democratic	1982	Incumbent retired. Democratic hold.	▌ ✓ Silvestre Reyes (Democratic) 70.63%; ▌Rick Ledesma (Republican) 27.60%; ▌Carl Proffer (Natural Law) 1.76%
Texas 17	Charles Stenholm	Democratic	1978	Incumbent re-elected.	▌ ✓ Charles Stenholm (Democratic) 51.65%; ▌Rudy Izzard (Republican) 47.37%; ▌Richard Caro (Natural Law) 0.98%
Texas 18	Sheila Jackson Lee	Democratic	1994	Incumbent re-elected.	▌ ✓ Sheila Jackson Lee (Democratic) 77.07%; ▌Larry White (Republican) 10.14%; ▌Jerry Burley (Republican) 5.72%; ▌George A. Young (Republican) 3.87%; ▌Mike Lamson (Democratic) 3.20%
Texas 19	Larry Combest	Republican	1984	Incumbent re-elected.	▌ ✓ Larry Combest (Republican) 80.37%; ▌John Sawyer (Democratic) 19.63%
Texas 20	Henry B. González	Democratic	1961	Incumbent re-elected.	▌ ✓ Henry B. González (Democratic) 63.72%; ▌James Walker (Republican) 34.40%; ▌Alex DePeña (Libertarian) 1.56%; ▌Lyndon Felps (Natural Law) 0.32%
Texas 21	Lamar Smith	Republican	1986	Incumbent re-elected.	▌ ✓ Lamar Smith (Republican) 76.43%; ▌Gordon Wharton (Democratic) 22.40%; ▌Randy Rutenbeck (Natural Law) 1.16%
Texas 22	Tom DeLay	Republican	1984	Incumbent re-elected.	▌ ✓ Tom DeLay (Republican) 68.11%; ▌Scott D. Cunningham (Democratic) 31.89%
Texas 23	Henry Bonilla	Republican	1992	Incumbent re-elected.	▌ ✓ Henry Bonilla (Republican) 61.85%; ▌Charlie Jones (Democratic) 36.37%; ▌Linda Caswell (Natural Law) 1.78%
Texas 24	Martin Frost	Democratic	1978	Incumbent re-elected.	▌ ✓ Martin Frost (Democratic) 55.75%; ▌Ed Harrison (Republican) 39.07%; ▌Marion Jacob (Democratic) 3.33%; ▌Dale Mouton (Independent) 1.84%
Texas 25	Ken Bentsen	Democratic	1994	Incumbent re-elected.	▌ ✓ Ken Bentsen (Democratic) 57.32%; ▌Dolly Madison McKenna (Republican) 42.68%
Texas 26	Dick Armey	Republican	1984	Incumbent re-elected.	▌ ✓ Dick Armey (Republican) 73.63%; ▌Jerry Frankel (Democratic) 26.37%
Texas 27	Solomon Ortiz	Democratic	1982	Incumbent re-elected.	▌ ✓ Solomon Ortiz (Democratic) 64.64%; ▌Joe Gardner (Republican) 33.84%; ▌Kevin Richardson (Natural Law) 1.52%
Texas 28	Frank Tejeda	Democratic	1992	Incumbent re-elected.	▌ ✓ Frank Tejeda (Democratic) 75.37%; ▌Mark Cude (Republican) 23.40%; ▌Clifford Finley (Natural Law) 1.23%
Texas 29	Gene Green	Democratic	1992	Incumbent re-elected.	▌ ✓ Gene Green (Democratic) 67.51%; ▌Jack Rodriguez (Republican) 31.03%; ▌Jack Klinger (US Taxpayers) 1.46%
Texas 30	Eddie Bernice Johnson	Democratic	1992	Incumbent re-elected.	▌ ✓ Eddie Bernice Johnson (Democratic) 54.59%; ▌John Hendry (Republican) 18.28%; ▌James Sweatt (Democratic) 8.76%; ▌Marvin Crenshaw (Democratic) 6.87%; ▌Lisa Kitterman (Republican) 6.86%; ▌Lisa Hembry (Independent) 3.10%; ▌Ada Granado (Independent) 1.13%; ▌Stevan Hammond (Independent) 0.41%

== Utah ==
District	Incumbent			This race	
District	Representative	Party	First elected	Results	Candidates
Utah 1	Jim Hansen	Republican	1980	Incumbent re-elected.	▌ ✓ Jim Hansen (Republican) 68.31%; ▌Gregory Sanders (Democratic) 29.97%; ▌Randall Tolpinrud (Natural Law) 1.72%
Utah 2	Enid Greene	Republican	1994	Incumbent retired. Republican hold.	▌ ✓ Merrill Cook (Republican) 54.99%; ▌Rocky Anderson (Democratic) 42.44%; ▌Arly Pederson (Independent) 1.30%; ▌Catherine Carter (Natural Law) 1.26%
Utah 3	Bill Orton	Democratic	1990	Incumbent lost re-election. Republican gain.	▌ ✓ Chris Cannon (Republican) 51.14%; ▌Bill Orton (Democratic) 47.26%; ▌Amy Lassen (Libertarian) 1.13%; Others: ▌Gerald Slothower (Independent) 0.34%; ▌John Langford (Socialist Workers) 0.13%

== Vermont ==
District	Incumbent			This race	
District	Representative	Party	First elected	Results	Candidates
Vermont at-large	Bernie Sanders	Independent	1990	Incumbent re-elected.	▌ ✓ Bernie Sanders (Independent) 55.23%; ▌Susan Sweetser (Republican) 32.59%; ▌Jack Long (Democratic) 9.36%; ▌Thomas Morse (Libertarian) 1.06%; Others: ▌Peter Diamondstone (Liberty Union) 0.77%; ▌Robert Melamede (Grassroots) 0.53%; ▌Norio Kushi (Natural Law) 0.32%

== Virginia ==
District	Incumbent			This race	
District	Representative	Party	First elected	Results	Candidates
Virginia 1	Herb Bateman	Republican	1982	Incumbent re-elected.	▌ ✓ Herb Bateman (Republican); Uncontested
Virginia 2	Owen B. Pickett	Democratic	1986	Incumbent re-elected.	▌ ✓ Owen B. Pickett (Democratic) 64.77%; ▌John Tate (Independent) 35.11%
Virginia 3	Bobby Scott	Democratic	1992	Incumbent re-elected.	▌ ✓ Bobby Scott (Democratic) 82.12%; ▌Elsie Holland (Republican) 17.85%
Virginia 4	Norman Sisisky	Democratic	1982	Incumbent re-elected.	▌ ✓ Norman Sisisky (Democratic) 78.61%; ▌Tony Zevgolis (Republican) 21.37%
Virginia 5	Lewis F. Payne Jr.	Democratic	1988	Incumbent retired. Democratic hold.	▌ ✓ Virgil Goode (Democratic) 60.79%; ▌George Landrith (Republican) 35.81%; ▌Tex Wood (Reform) 3.35%
Virginia 6	Bob Goodlatte	Republican	1992	Incumbent re-elected.	▌ ✓ Bob Goodlatte (Republican) 67.00%; ▌Jeffrey Grey (Democratic) 30.84%; ▌Jay Rutledge (Independent) 2.12%
Virginia 7	Thomas J. Bliley Jr.	Republican	1980	Incumbent re-elected.	▌ ✓ Thomas J. Bliley Jr. (Republican) 75.10%; ▌Roderic Slayton (Democratic) 20.28%; ▌Bradley Evans (Independent) 4.56%
Virginia 8	Jim Moran	Democratic	1990	Incumbent re-elected.	▌ ✓ Jim Moran (Democratic) 66.40%; ▌John Otey (Republican) 28.14%; ▌Ward Edmonds (Reform) 2.72%; ▌Sarina Grosswald (Independent) 2.28%; ▌Charles Severance (Independent) 0.32%
Virginia 9	Rick Boucher	Democratic	1982	Incumbent re-elected.	▌ ✓ Rick Boucher (Democratic) 65.00%; ▌Patrick Muldoon (Republican) 30.70%; ▌Tom Roberts (Reform) 4.27%
Virginia 10	Frank Wolf	Republican	1980	Incumbent re-elected.	▌ ✓ Frank Wolf (Republican) 72.02%; ▌Bob Weinberg (Democratic) 25.17%; ▌Gary Reams (Independent) 2.76%
Virginia 11	Tom Davis	Republican	1994	Incumbent re-elected.	▌ ✓ Tom Davis (Republican) 64.10%; ▌Tom Horton (Independent) 34.51%; ▌Levi Levy (Independent) 1.31%

== Washington ==
As of 2022, these were the last elections in which the Republican Party won a majority of congressional districts from Washington.

District	Incumbent			This race	
District	Representative	Party	First elected	Results	Candidates
Washington 1	Rick White	Republican	1994	Incumbent re-elected.	▌ ✓ Rick White (Republican) 53.74%; ▌Jeff Coopersmith (Democratic) 46.26%
Washington 2	Jack Metcalf	Republican	1994	Incumbent re-elected.	▌ ✓ Jack Metcalf (Republican) 48.51%; ▌Kevin Quigley (Democratic) 47.76%; ▌Karen Leibrant (Natural Law) 3.72%
Washington 3	Linda Smith	Republican	1994	Incumbent re-elected.	▌ ✓ Linda Smith (Republican) 50.18%; ▌Brian Baird (Democratic) 49.82%
Washington 4	Doc Hastings	Republican	1994	Incumbent re-elected.	▌ ✓ Doc Hastings (Republican) 52.96%; ▌Rick Locke (Democratic) 47.04%
Washington 5	George Nethercutt	Republican	1994	Incumbent re-elected.	▌ ✓ George Nethercutt (Republican) 55.58%; ▌Judy Olson (Democratic) 44.41%
Washington 6	Norm Dicks	Democratic	1976	Incumbent re-elected.	▌ ✓ Norm Dicks (Democratic) 65.90%; ▌Bill Tinsley (Republican) 30.24%; ▌Ted Haley (Independent) 2.36%; ▌Michael Huddleston (Natural Law) 1.50%
Washington 7	Jim McDermott	Democratic	1988	Incumbent re-elected.	▌ ✓ Jim McDermott (Democratic) 80.96%; ▌Frank Kleschen (Republican) 19.04%
Washington 8	Jennifer Dunn	Republican	1992	Incumbent re-elected.	▌ ✓ Jennifer Dunn (Republican) 65.39%; ▌Dave Little (Democratic) 34.61%
Washington 9	Randy Tate	Republican	1994	Incumbent lost re-election. Democratic gain.	▌ ✓ Adam Smith (Democratic) 50.14%; ▌Randy Tate (Republican) 47.27%; ▌David Gruenstein (Natural Law) 2.59%

== West Virginia ==
District	Incumbent			This race	
District	Representative	Party	First elected	Results	Candidates
West Virginia 1	Alan Mollohan	Democratic	1982	Incumbent re-elected.	▌ ✓ Alan Mollohan (Democratic); Uncontested
West Virginia 2	Bob Wise	Democratic	1982	Incumbent re-elected.	▌ ✓ Bob Wise (Democratic) 68.89%; ▌Greg Morris (Republican) 31.11%
West Virginia 3	Nick Rahall	Democratic	1976	Incumbent re-elected.	▌ ✓ Nick Rahall (Democratic); Uncontested

== Wisconsin ==
District	Incumbent			This race	
District	Representative	Party	First elected	Results	Candidates
Wisconsin 1	Mark Neumann	Republican	1994	Incumbent re-elected.	▌ ✓ Mark Neumann (Republican) 50.89%; ▌Lydia Spottswood (Democratic) 49.03%
Wisconsin 2	Scott Klug	Republican	1990	Incumbent re-elected.	▌ ✓ Scott Klug (Republican) 57.38%; ▌Paul Soglin (Democratic) 41.01%; ▌Ben Masel (Libertarian) 2%
Wisconsin 3	Steve Gunderson	Republican	1980	Incumbent retired. Democratic gain.	▌ ✓ Ron Kind (Democratic) 51.98%; ▌James Harsdorf (Republican) 47.79%
Wisconsin 4	Jerry Kleczka	Democratic	1984	Incumbent re-elected.	▌ ✓ Jerry Kleczka (Democratic) 57.64%; ▌Thomas G. Reynolds (Republican) 42.20%
Wisconsin 5	Tom Barrett	Democratic	1992	Incumbent re-elected.	▌ ✓ Tom Barrett (Democratic) 73.31%; ▌Paul Melotik (Republican) 24.61%; ▌James Soderna (US Taxpayers) 2%
Wisconsin 6	Tom Petri	Republican	1979 (Special)	Incumbent re-elected.	▌ ✓ Tom Petri (Republican) 73.02%; ▌Al Lindskoog (Democratic) 23.90%; ▌James Dean (US Taxpayers) 2%; ▌Timothy Farness (Independent) 1%
Wisconsin 7	Dave Obey	Democratic	1969 (Special)	Incumbent re-elected.	▌ ✓ Dave Obey (Democratic) 57.05%; ▌Scott West (Republican) 42.91%
Wisconsin 8	Toby Roth	Republican	1978	Incumbent retired. Democratic gain.	▌ ✓ Jay Johnson (Democratic) 52.00%; ▌David Prosser Jr. (Republican) 47.92%
Wisconsin 9	Jim Sensenbrenner	Republican	1978	Incumbent re-elected.	▌ ✓ Jim Sensenbrenner (Republican) 75%; ▌Floyd Brenholt (Democratic) 25%

== Wyoming ==
District	Incumbent			This race	
District	Representative	Party	First elected	Results	Candidates
Wyoming at-large	Barbara Cubin	Republican	1994	Incumbent re-elected.	▌ ✓ Barbara Cubin (Republican) 55.24%; ▌Pete Maxfield (Democratic) 40.82%; ▌Dave Dawson (Libertarian) 3.93%

== See also ==
- 104th United States Congress
- 105th United States Congress
