= 1994 United States House of Representatives elections in Kansas =

- November 8, 1994

All 4 Kansas seats to the United States House of Representatives
	Majority party	Minority party
Party	Republican	Democratic
Last election	2	2
Seats won	4	0
Seat change	▲2	▼2
Popular vote	519,127	298,269
Percentage	63.51%	36.49%
Swing	▲10.91%	▼6.93%

Republican
50–60%
60–70%
70–80%
80–90%
>90%
Democratic
50–60%
60–70%

The 1994 United States House of Representatives elections in Kansas were held on November 8, 1994, to determine who would represent the state of Kansas in the United States House of Representatives. Kansas has four seats in the House, apportioned according to the 1990 United States census. Representatives are elected for two-year terms.

== Overview ==
United States House of Representatives elections in Kansas, 1994
Party	Votes	Percentage	Seats	+/–
Republican	519,127	63.51%	4	+2
Democratic	298,269	36.49%	0	-2
Totals	817,396	100.00%	4	-
