= 1994 United States House of Representatives elections in Nebraska =

- November 8, 1994

All 3 Nebraska seats to the United States House of Representatives
	Majority party	Minority party
Party	Republican	Democratic
Last election	2	1
Seats won	3	0
Seat change	▲1	▼1
Popular vote	365,402	203,102
Percentage	64.02%	35.58%

The 1994 United States House of Representatives elections in Nebraska were held on November 8, 1994, to elect the state of Nebraska's three members to the United States House of Representatives. All three incumbent members of Congress ran for re-election. In the 1st district and 3rd district, Republican Congressmen Doug Bereuter and Bill Barrett won re-election in landslides. And in the 2nd district, Democratic Congressman Peter Hoagland narrowly lost re-election to Republican Jon Christensen.

== Overview ==
1994 United States House of Representatives elections in Nebraska
Party	Votes	Percentage	Seats	+/–
Republican	365,402	64.02%	3	▲1
Democratic	203,102	35.58%	0	▼1
Write-ins	2,299	0.40%	0	—
Totals	570,803	100.00%	3	—

== District 1 ==
Incumbent Republican Congressman Doug Bereuter ran for re-election. He was challenged by Democratic nominee Patrick Combs, a business consultant. He defeated Combs by a wide margin, winning 63 percent of the vote to Combs's 37 percent.

=== Republican primary ===
==== Candidates ====
- Doug Bereuter, incumbent U.S. Representative

==== Results ====
Republican primary results
Party	Candidate	Votes	%
Republican	Doug Bereuter (inc.)	49,524	98.69%
Republican	Write-ins	656	1.31%
Total votes		50,180	100.00%

=== Democratic primary ===
==== Candidates ====
- Patrick Combs, business consultant, used car dealer
- Marlin Pals, perennial candidate

==== Results ====
Democratic primary results
Party	Candidate	Votes	%
Democratic	Patrick Combs	23,295	74.04%
Democratic	Marlin Pals	7,996	25.41%
Democratic	Write-ins	171	0.54%
Total votes		31,462	100.00%

=== General election ===
==== Candidates ====
- Doug Bereuter (Republican)
- Patrick Combs (Democratic)

==== Results ====
1994 Nebraska's 1st congressional district general election results
Party	Candidate	Votes	%
Republican	Doug Bereuter (inc.)	117,967	62.57%
Democratic	Patrick Combs	70,369	37.32%
Write-ins		214	0.11%
Total votes		188,550	100.00%
Republican hold			

== District 2 ==
Incumbent Democratic Congressman Peter Hoagland ran for re-election to a fourth term. Insurance salesman Jon Christensen won the Republican primary over State Senator Brad Ashford and former County Attorney Ron Staskiewicz. In the general election, Christensen narrowly defeated Hoagland for re-election, winning 50 percent of the vote to Hoagland's 49 percent.

=== Republican primary ===
==== Candidates ====
- Jon Christensen, insurance salesman
- Brad Ashford, State Senator
- Ron Staskiewicz, former Douglas County Attorney, 1992 Republican nominee for Congress

==== Results ====
Republican primary results
Party	Candidate	Votes	%
Republican	Jon Christensen	26,494	52.70%
Republican	Brad Ashford	12,340	24.55%
Republican	Ron Staskiewicz	11,436	22.75%
Republican	Write-ins	1	0.00%
Total votes		50,271	100.00%

=== Democratic primary ===
==== Candidates ====
- Peter Hoagland, incumbent U.S. Representative
- Jess M. Pritchett, perennial candidate

==== Results ====
Democratic primary results
Party	Candidate	Votes	%
Democratic	Peter Hoagland (inc.)	24,370	72.56%
Democratic	Jess M. Pritchett	9,210	27.42%
Democratic	Write-ins	7	0.02%
Total votes		33,587	100.00%

=== General election ===
==== Candidates ====
- Jon Christensen (Republican)
- Peter Hoagland (Democratic)

==== Results ====
1994 Nebraska's 2nd congressional district general election results
Party	Candidate	Votes	%
Republican	Jon Christensen	92,516	49.92%
Democratic	Peter Hoagland (inc.)	90,750	48.97%
Write-ins		2,044	1.10%
Total votes		185,310	100.00%
Republican gain from Democratic			

== District 3 ==
Incumbent Republican Congressman Bill Barrett ran for re-election to a third term. He was challenged by businessman Gil Chapin, who won the Democratic nomination unopposed. Barrett defeated Chapin in a landslide, winning 79 percent of the vote to Chapin's 21 percent.

=== Republican primary ===
==== Candidates ====
- Bill Barrett, incumbent U.S. Representative

==== Results ====
Republican primary results
Party	Candidate	Votes	%
Republican	Bill Barrett (inc.)	80,942	99.84%
Republican	Write-ins	132	0.16%
Total votes		81,074	100.00%

=== Democratic primary ===
==== Candidates ====
- Gil Chapin, businessman

==== Results ====
Democratic primary results
Party	Candidate	Votes	%
Democratic	Gil Chapin	30,402	99.60%
Democratic	Write-ins	122	0.40%
Total votes		30,524	100.00%

=== General election ===
==== Candidates ====
- Bill Barrett (Republican)
- Gil Chapin (Democratic)

==== Results ====
1994 Nebraska's 3rd congressional district general election results
Party	Candidate	Votes	%
Republican	Bill Barrett (inc.)	154,919	78.66%
Democratic	Gil Chapin	41,983	21.32%
Write-ins		41	0.02%
Total votes		196,943	100.00%
Republican hold			

== See also ==
- 1994 United States House of Representatives elections
