= 2010 Texas gubernatorial election =

- November 2, 2010
- Turnout: 38% (of registered voters); 27% (of eligible voters)
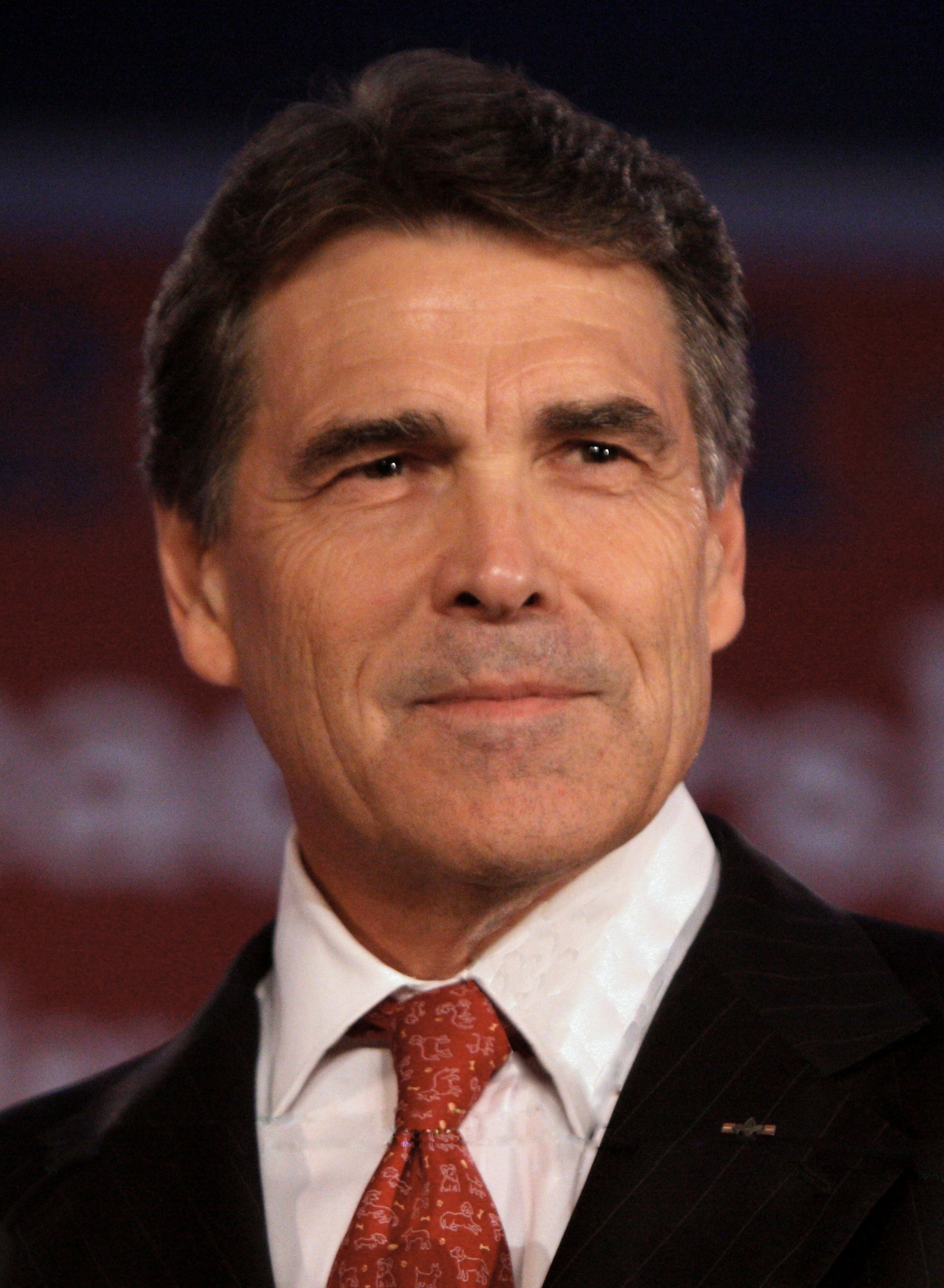

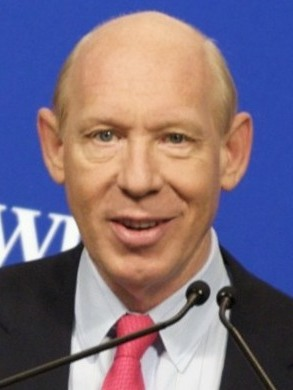
Nominee	Rick Perry	Bill White
Party	Republican	Democratic
Popular vote	2,737,481	2,106,395
Percentage	54.97%	42.30%
- Perry: 40–50% 50–60% 60–70% 70–80% 80–90% >90% White: 40–50% 50–60% 60–70% 70–80% 80–90% >90% Tie: 50% No data
Governor before election
Rick Perry
Republican
Elected Governor
Rick Perry
Republican

The 2010 Texas gubernatorial election was held on Tuesday, November 2, 2010, to elect the governor of Texas. Incumbent Republican governor Rick Perry ran successfully for election to a third consecutive term. He won the Republican primary against U.S. senator Kay Bailey Hutchison and political newcomer, Debra Medina. The former mayor of Houston, Bill White, won the Democratic nomination. Kathie Glass, a lawyer from Houston and previous candidate for Texas attorney general, won the Libertarian nomination. Deb Shafto was the nominee of the Texas Green Party. Andy Barron, an orthodontist from Lubbock, was a declared write-in candidate.

Exit polls showed Perry winning Whites (71% to 29%), while White performed well among African Americans (88% to 12%) and Latinos (61% to 38%). Perry's fourth inauguration for a third full four-year term began on January 18, 2011, on the State Capitol South Grounds. As of 2026, this is the last time Foard, Falls, Trinity, and Reeves counties voted for the Democratic candidate for governor.

== Republican primary ==
=== Candidates ===
- Kay Bailey Hutchison, U.S. senator
- Debra Medina, political activist
- Rick Perry, incumbent governor

=== Endorsements ===
Rick Perry

Statewide officials

- Haley Barbour, governor of Mississippi
- Bill Clements, former governor of Texas (1979–1983, 1987–1991)
- Sarah Palin, former governor of Alaska and 2008 Republican vice presidential candidate

Local officials

- Rudy Giuliani, former mayor of New York City (1994–2001)

Individuals

- David Barton, businessman and former Texas GOP vice chairman
- Bill Bennett, former United States Secretary of Education
- Brent Bozell, activist and businessman
- James Dobson, author and evangelist
- Tom Hicks, businessman
- Art Laffer, economic advisor
- Grover Norquist, activist
- Tom Pauken, former chair of the Republican Party of Texas
- Tony Perkins, PAC executive
- T. Boone Pickens, businessman
- Michael Reagan, radio commentator
- Phyllis Schlafly, activist and attorney

Organizations

- Citizens Against Government Waste PAC
- NRA Political Victory Fund
- Texas Alliance for Life
- Texas Department of Public Safety Officers Association PAC
Debra Medina

Individuals

- Alex Jones, radio host and conspiracy theorist
- Larry Kilgore, former gubernatorial candidate and advocate for Texas secession

Organizations

- Republican Liberty Caucus
Kay Bailey Hutchinson

Executive officials

- James Baker, former US Secretary of State
- George H. W. Bush, former president of the United States
- Dick Cheney, former vice president of the United States
- Margaret Spellings, former United States Secretary of Education

Federal officials

- Dick Armey, former U.S. congressman and House majority leader from Texas's 26th congressional district
- John Carter, U.S. congressman from Texas's 31st congressional district
- John Culberson, U.S. congressman from Texas's 7th congressional district
- Phil Gramm, former U.S. senator from Texas
- Kay Granger, U.S. representative from Texas's 12th congressional district
- Randy Neugebauer, U.S. congressman from Texas's 19th congressional district
- Ted Poe, U.S. representative from Texas's 2nd congressional district

Individuals

- Barbara Bush, former first lady of the United States
- John L. Nau, former chairman of the Advisory Council on Historic Preservation
- Nolan Ryan, former Texas Rangers pitcher
- Roger Staubach, businessman, former US Navy officer and former Dallas Cowboys quarterback

Newspapers and publications

- Amarillo Globe News
- Austin American-Statesman
- Beaumont Enterprise
- Corpus Christi Caller-Times
- The Daily Texan
- Dallas Morning News
- The Eagle
- The El Paso Times
- Fort Worth Star-Telegram
- Houston Chronicle
- Lubbock Avalanche-Journal
- Marshall News Messenger
- San Antonio Express-News
- Wichita Falls Times Record News

=== Polling ===
Note: polls used different sample sizes and citizen groups. A candidate must have a majority of the vote (>50%) to avoid a runoff with their second place opponent.

Poll source	Date(s) administered	Rick Perry	Kay Bailey Hutchison	Debra Medina	Other	Unde- cided
Rasmussen Reports	February 23, 2010	48%	27%	16%	—	9%
Public Policy Polling (report)	February 19–21, 2010	40%	31%	20%	—	9%
Research 2000 (report)	February 8–10, 2010	42%	30%	17%	—	11%
Public Policy Polling (report)	February 4–7, 2010	39%	28%	24%	—	10%
University of Texas (report)	February 1–7, 2010	45%	21%	19%	—	16%
Rasmussen Reports (report)	February 1, 2010	44%	29%	16%	—	11%
Rasmussen Reports (report)	January 17, 2010	43%	33%	12%	—	11%
Rasmussen Reports (report)	November 13, 2009	46%	35%	4%	—	14%
University of Texas (report)	November 3, 2009	42%	30%	7%	4%	18%
Rasmussen Reports (report)	September 16, 2009	38%	40%	3%	—	19%
Rasmussen Reports (report)	July 15, 2009	46%	36%	—	5%	14%
Texas Politics (report)	June 11–22, 2009	38%	27%	—	8%	26%
Texas Politics (report)	June 11–22, 2009	38%	26%	—	9%	27%
Texas Lyceum (report)	June 5–12, 2009	33%	21%	—	1%	41%
Rasmussen Reports (report)	May 7, 2009	42%	38%	—	7%	13%
Texas Politics (report)	February 24 – March 6, 2009	29%	37%	—	10%	24%
Public Policy Polling (report)	February 18–20, 2009	31%	56%	—	—	—
Texas Lyceum (report)	June 12–20, 2008	22%	35%	—	—	—

=== Debate ===
2010 Texas gubernatorial election Republican primary debate
No.	Date	Host	Moderator	Link	Republican	Republican	Republican
Key: P Participant A Absent N Not invited I Invited W Withdrawn							
Key: P Participant A Absent N Not invited I Invited W Withdrawn					Kay Bailey Hutchison	Debra Medina	Rick Perry
1	Jan. 14, 2010	Fort Worth Star-Telegram; KERA-TV; KTVT-TV	Shelley Kofler	C-SPAN	P	P	P

=== Results ===
Results of the Republican gubernatorial primary by county: Rick Perry Kay Bailey Hutchison Debra Medina No votes

Republican primary results
Party	Candidate	Votes	%
Republican	Rick Perry (incumbent)	759,296	51.2%
Republican	Kay Bailey Hutchison	450,087	30.3%
Republican	Debra Medina	275,159	18.5%
Total votes		1,484,542	

== Democratic primary ==
=== Candidates ===
==== Declared ====
- Alma Ludivina Aguado, physician
- Felix Alvarado, educator and U.S. Air Force veteran
- Bill Dear, private investigator
- Clement E. Glenn, associate professor of education at Prairie View A&M University
- Star Locke, homebuilder
- Farouk Shami, businessman
- Bill White, former mayor of Houston

==== Withdrew ====
- Tom Schieffer, former U.S. Ambassador to Japan & U.S. Ambassador to Australia

=== Endorsements ===
Bill White

Executive officials

- Henry Cisneros, former United States Secretary of Housing and Urban Development
- Bill Clinton, former president of the United States
- Tom Schieffer, former U.S. ambassador to Japan and Australia

Federal officials

- Lloyd Doggett, U.S. congressman from Texas's 25th congressional district
- Rubén Hinojosa, U.S. representative from Texas's 15th congressional district

Statewide officials

- Pete Laney, former speaker of the Texas House of Representatives
- Mark White, former governor of Texas

State officials

- Alma Allen, state representative - Houston
- Carol Alvarado, state representative - Houston
- Rafael Anchia, state representative - Dallas
- Joe Bernal, former state senator
- Valinda Bolton, state representative
- Barbara Mallory Caraway, state representative - Dallas
- Joaquin Castro, state representative - San Antonio
- Norma Chavez, state representative - El Paso
- Ellen Cohen, state representative - Houston
- Garnet Coleman, state representative - Houston
- John Cook, El Paso mayor
- Jim Dunnam, state representative - Waco
- Veronica Escobar, El Paso County commissioner
- David Farabee, state representative - Wichita Falls
- Joe Farias, state representative - San Antonio
- Jessica Farrar, state representative - Houston
- Pete Gallego, state representative - Presidio
- Helen Giddings, state representative - DeSoto
- Ana Hernandez, state representative - Houston
- Abel Herrero, state representative - Robstown
- Juan Hinojosa, state senator - Corpus Christi
- Scott Hochberg, state representative - Houston
- Donna Howard, state representative - Austin
- Eddie Lucio, state representative - Brownsville
- Diana Maldonado, state representative - Austin
- Marisa Marquez, state representative - El Paso
- Ruth Jones McClendon, state representative - San Antonio
- Jose Menendez, state representative - San Antonio
- Joe Moody, state representative - El Paso
- Paul Moreno, former state representative
- Elliott Naishtat, state representative - Austin
- Rick Noriega, United States Senate election in Texas, 2008 Democratic candidate and former state representative
- René Oliveira, state representative - Brownsville
- Paula Pierson, state representative - Arlington
- Chente Quintanilla, state representative - El Paso
- Richard Raymond, state representative - Laredo
- Eddie Rodriguez, state representative - Austin
- Patrick Rose, state representative - San Marcos
- Eliot Shapleigh, state senator - El Paso
- Mark Strama, state representative - Austin
- Chris Thibaut, state representative - Houston
- Chris Turner, state representative - Burleson
- Sylvester Turner, state representative - Houston
- Carlos Uresti, state senator - Monahans
- Leticia Van de Putte, state senator - San Antonio
- Marc Veasey, state representative - Fort Worth
- Mike Villarreal, state representative - San Antonio
- Hubert Vo, state representative - Houston
- Armando Walle, state representative - Houston
- Kirk Watson, state senator - Austin

Local officials

- Julian Castro, mayor of San Antonio, Texas
- Phil Hardberger, former mayor of San Antonio, Texas
- Lee Leffingwell, mayor of Austin, Texas
- Annise Parker, mayor of Houston, Texas
- Nelson Wolff, former mayor of San Antonio, Texas

Newspapers and publications

- Austin-American Statesman
- Houston Chronicle

=== Polling ===
Poll source	Date(s) administered	Felix Alvarado	Alma Aguado	Kinky Friedman*	Tom Schieffer*	Bill White	Farouk Shami	Unde- cided
Public Policy Polling (report)	February 19–21, 2010	5%	3%	—	—	59%	12%	18%
Public Policy Polling (report)	February 4–7, 2010	5%	2%	—	—	49%	19%	24%
University of Texas (report)	October 20–27, 2009	2%	—	19%	10%	—	—	55%
University of Texas (report)	June 11–22, 2009	—	—	12%	2%	—	—	62%
Texas Lyceum (report)	June 5–12, 2007	—	—	10%	6%	—	—	73%
Wilson Research (report)	September 21, 2007	—	—	9%	—	12%	—	30%

* Dropped out prior to the primary.

=== Results ===
Results of the Democratic gubernatorial primary by county: White: White—>90%; White—80–90%; White—70–80%; White—60–70%; White—50–60%; White—40–50%; White—<40%; No vote: No vote

Democratic primary results
Party	Candidate	Votes	%
Democratic	Bill White	517,487	76.0%
Democratic	Farouk Shami	87,411	12.8%
Democratic	Felix Alvarado	33,714	5.0%
Democratic	Alma Aguado	19,273	2.8%
Democratic	Clement E. Glenn	9,836	1.5%
Democratic	Bill Dear	6,551	1.0%
Democratic	Star Locke	6,276	0.9%
Total votes		680,548	

== General election ==
=== Candidates ===
- Andy Barron (write-in), orthodontist
- Kathie Glass (L), attorney
- Rick Perry (R), incumbent governor
- Deb Shafto (G), educator
- Bill White (D), former Houston mayor

=== Predictions ===
Source	Ranking	As of
Cook Political Report	Tossup	October 14, 2010
Rothenberg	Lean R	October 28, 2010
RealClearPolitics	Lean R	November 1, 2010
Sabato's Crystal Ball	Likely R	October 28, 2010
CQ Politics	Lean R	October 28, 2010

=== Polling ===
Poll source	Date(s) administered	Sample size	Margin of error	Rick; Perry (R)	Kathie; Glass (L)	Bill; White (D)	Other	Unde- cided
Public Policy Polling (report)	October 26–28, 2010	568	± 4.1%	53%	—	44%	—	3%
Lighthouse Opinion and Polling Research (report)	October 15–17, 2010	1200	± 2.9%	48%	3%	37%	1%	11%
Public Policy Polling (report)	September 2–6, 2010	538	± 4.2%	48%	—	42%	—	10%
Rasmussen Reports (report)	August 22, 2010	500	± 4.5%	49%	—	41%	3%	7%
Rasmussen Reports (report)	July 13, 2010	500	± 4.5%	50%	—	41%	2%	7%
Public Policy Polling (report)	June 19–21, 2010	500	± 4.4%	43%	—	43%	—	14%
Rasmussen Reports (report)	June 16, 2010	500	± 4.5%	48%	—	40%	5%	8%
Rasmussen Reports (report)	May 13, 2010	500	± 4.5%	51%	—	38%	4%	6%
Rasmussen Reports (report)	April 14, 2010	500	± 4.5%	48%	—	44%	2%	6%
Rasmussen Reports (report)	March 3, 2010	500	± 4.5%	49%	—	43%	3%	6%
Rasmussen Reports (report)	February 22, 2010	1,200	± 3.0%	47%	—	41%	5%	7%
Public Policy Polling (report)	February 4–7, 2010	1,200	± 2.8%	48%	—	42%	—	10%
Rasmussen Reports (report)	February 1, 2010	1,000	± 3.0%	48%	—	39%	5%	8%
Rasmussen Reports (report)	January 17, 2010	1,000	± 3.0%	50%	—	40%	4%	6%

=== Results ===
County Flips: Democratic Hold Flip / Republican Hold Flip

2010 Texas gubernatorial election
Party	Candidate	Votes	%	±%
Republican	Rick Perry (incumbent)	2,737,481	54.97%	+15.95
Democratic	Bill White	2,106,395	42.30%	+12.52
Libertarian	Kathie Glass	109,211	2.19%	+1.58
Green	Deb Shafto	19,516	0.39%	N/A
Independent	Andy Barron (write-in)	7,267	0.15%	N/A
Majority		631,086	12.67	
Turnout		4,979,870	43.79%	+8.78
Republican hold				

Counties that flipped from Democratic to Republican

- Bee (largest city: Beeville)
- Fisher (largest city: Rotan)
- Haskell (largest city: Haskell)
- Marion (largest city: Jefferson)
- Morris (largest city: Daingerfield)
- Newton (largest city: Newton)
- Calhoun (largest city: Port Lavaca)
- Bastrop (largest city: Elgin)
- Stonewall (largest city: Aspermont)
- Swisher (largest city: Tulia)
- Crosby (largest city: Crosbyton)
- Red River (largest city: Clarksville)
- Jefferson (largest city: Beaumont)

Counties that flipped from Republican to Democratic

- Bexar (largest city: San Antonio)
- Cameron (largest city: Brownsville)
- Culberson (largest municipality: Van Horn)
- Harris (largest municipality: Houston)
- Kleberg (largest municipality: Kingsville)
- Trinity (largest city: Trinity)

Counties that flipped from Independent to Democratic

- Falls (largest city: Marlin)

Counties that flipped from Independent to Republican

- Nolan (largest city: Sweetwater)
- Cooke (largest city: Gainesville)
- Goliad (largest city: Goliad)
- Wilson (largest city: Floresville)
- Wharton (largest city: El Campo)

== Analysis ==
Texas does not have term limits for its governors; thus, gubernatorial incumbents have been free to run as often as they want, if they are eligible for the office. The Republicans and Democrats chose their gubernatorial nominees based on the results of primary votes held on March 2, 2010 (the first Tuesday in March). Both parties' candidates received at least 20 percent of the total votes cast for governor in the 2006 election; thus, they must nominate their candidates via primary election. Any third party that obtains ballot access must nominate its candidates via a statewide convention, which by law must be held on June 12, 2010 (the second Saturday in June). The Libertarian Party obtained ballot access automatically due to its 2008 showing, in which one of its nominees attracted over one million votes.

In the primary election, the party's winning candidate must garner a majority (over 50%) of votes cast; otherwise, the top two candidates face each other in a runoff election. However, in the general election, the winning candidate needs only a plurality of votes to be elected governor (as was the case with the 2006 election and the 1990 election, in which Libertarian Jeff Daiell attracted over 129,000 votes). Independent and write-in candidates may seek ballot access; however, the criteria for such access are quite strict (see "Ballot Access" below). Nevertheless, in the 2006 election, two independent candidates, Carole Keeton Strayhorn, the Republican State Comptroller, and Kinky Friedman, a popular Texas country musician, obtained enough signatures to qualify. The Libertarian nominee, James Werner, was on the ballot automatically because of that party's Texas showing in the 2004 general election.

=== Political party candidates ===
Any political party whose candidate for governor, during the 2006 election, garnered at least 20 percent of the total votes cast, must nominate all its candidates for all offices sought via primary election. In the 2006 election, both the Democratic candidate (Chris Bell) and the Republican candidate (Rick Perry) received this many votes; thus, both parties must hold primary elections using the two-round system. The primary elections must be held on the first Tuesday in March, and a candidate must receive a majority of votes cast in the primary election; otherwise, a runoff election between the top two finishers must be held on the second Tuesday in April.

A political party whose candidate for governor, during the 2006 election, received at least two percent but less than 20 percent of the total votes cast, may nominate its candidates for all offices sought via either a primary election (using the two-round system) or a state convention. If the party chooses to conduct a primary election, it must notify the Texas Secretary of State at least one year prior to the general election date and must nominate all its candidates via primary election. No third-party candidate met this requirement in 2006; the last to do so was the Libertarian Party in 1990 (when nominee Jeff Daiell polled over 3.3% of the vote).

All other political parties must nominate their candidates via state convention, which by law must be held on the second Saturday in June. In order to qualify for ballot access at the general election, the party must either:

- have had at least one candidate, in the previous statewide election, garner at least five percent of the total votes cast for that office (only the Libertarian Party met this requirement), or
- within 75 days after conducting its precinct conventions, submit lists of said conventions, whose total participant count equals at least one percent of the total votes cast in the previous gubernatorial election.
- If the political party cannot meet the precinct convention count requirement, it may file a supplemental petition, the number of signatures on which, when added to the count from the precinct convention lists, totals the required one percent, but must do so within the 75-day period above. Any person signing a supplemental petition must not have voted in any party's primary election or runoff election, or participated in any other third-party's convention.

=== Independent candidates ===
Should an independent gubernatorial candidate seek ballot access in the state of Texas, the candidate must meet the following requirements:

- The candidate must obtain signatures from registered voters, in an amount equalling at least one percent of the total votes cast in the prior gubernatorial election, the same as for third-party access.
- The signatures must come from registered voters who did not vote in either the Democratic or Republican primaries or in any runoff elections for governor.
- The signatures must come from registered voters who have not signed a petition for any other independent candidate. If a supporter signed more than one petition, only the first signature counts.
- The signatures cannot be obtained until after the primary election (if either political party primary requires a runoff election, the signatures cannot be obtained until after such runoff election) and the petition must be filed no later than 5:00 pm (Austin time, the filing must be with the Texas Secretary of State) on the 30th day after the scheduled runoff primary election day (even if none is held).

=== Write-in candidates ===
In the event a candidate does not qualify for independent status, the person may still run as a write-in candidate. The candidate must either:

- pay a $3,750 filing fee, or
- submit 5,000 qualified signatures. However, the petition must be filed by 5:00 pm of the 70th day before general election day, and cannot be filed earlier than 30 days before this deadline.
