= Pendleton Murrah =

Governor of Texas from 1863 to 1865

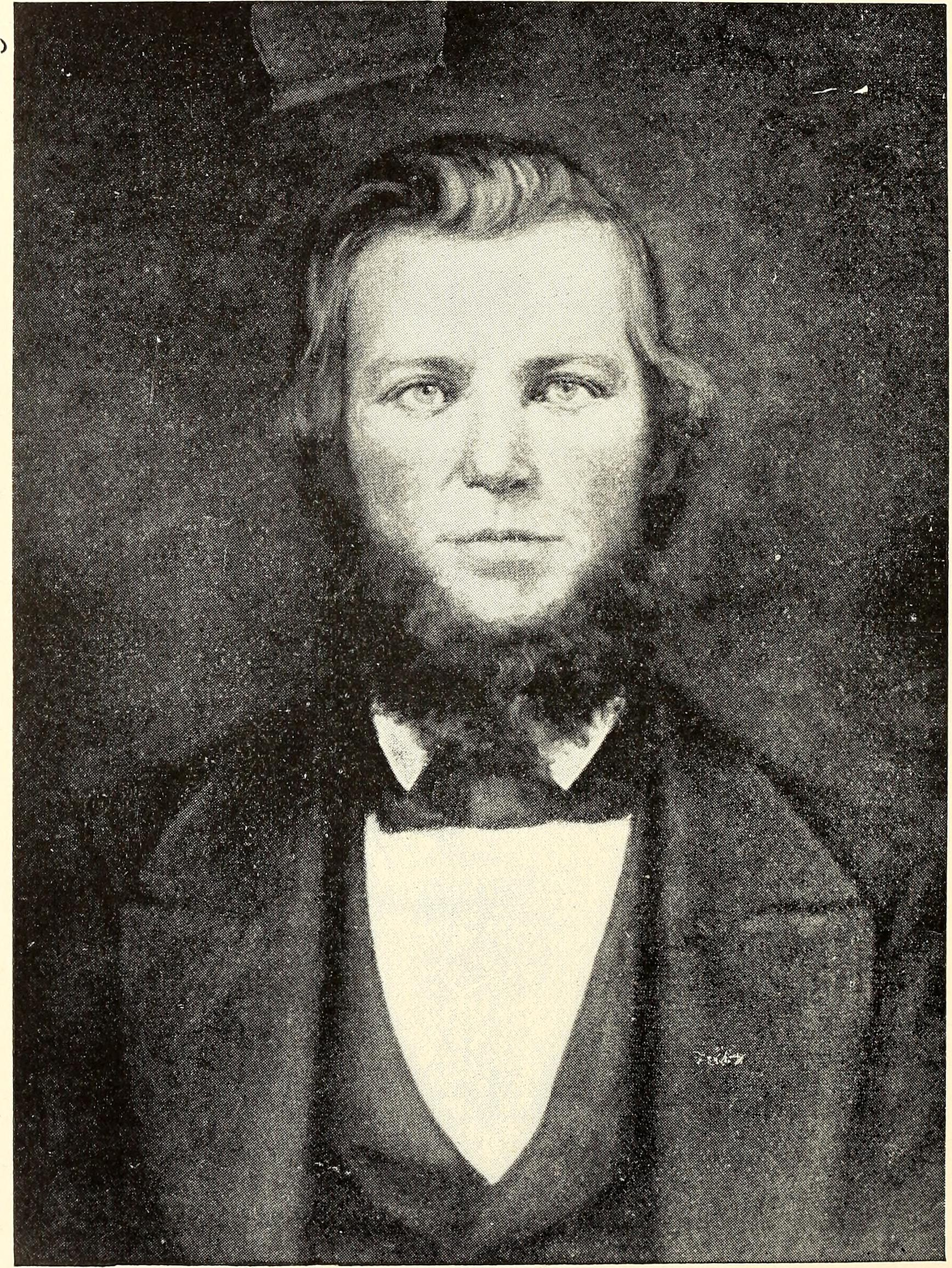
- Murrah in an 1893 publication

10th Governor of Texas
- In office November 5, 1863 – June 17, 1865
- Lieutenant: Fletcher Stockdale
- Preceded by: Francis Lubbock
- Succeeded by: Andrew Jackson Hamilton

Member of the Texas House of Representatives from the 15th district
- In office November 12, 1857 – November 7, 1859
- Preceded by: William A. Tarlton
- Succeeded by: Eli Harris Baxter Jr.

Personal details
- Born: January 1, 1824 Alabama, U.S.
- Died: August 4, 1865 (aged 41) Monterrey, Mexico
- Party: Democratic
- Spouse: Sue Taylor

Pendleton Murrah (January 1, 1824 – August 4, 1865) was the tenth governor of Texas from 1863 to 1865. He came to office in the middle of the American Civil War and fled to Mexico during the war's final stages, dying there in August 1865.

== Early life and career ==
Murrah's birth date and birth location vary from source to source. Some have him born in 1824; others give his birth year as 1826. According to his 1850 and 1860 entries in the U.S. Census, Murrah was a native of Alabama. His birthplace is sometimes listed as South Carolina, but more recent sources indicate he was born in Bibb County and was the illegitimate son of Peggy Murrah, a daughter of Charles and Avarilla Jones Murrah. He was raised and educated in a Baptist orphanage, and graduated from Brown University in 1848. He then studied law and was admitted to the bar in Alabama, before moving to Texas in 1850, opening a law practice in Marshall.

Murrah first ran for a seat in the Texas House of Representatives in 1855, but lost. He was then successfully elected to the state legislature in 1857, and also served on the executive committee of the Texas Democratic Party. Following the secession of Texas from the United States, in 1861 he considered running for a seat in the Confederate Congress, but declined because of ill health. Murrah suffered from tuberculosis which affected him all of his adult life. At the outbreak of the American Civil War, he accepted a commission in the 14th Texas Infantry, a Confederate Army unit commanded by former governor Edward Clark, but he had to resign his commission due to his poor health.

== Texas governor ==
Standing in the August 1863 gubernatorial election, Murrah was considered to be the candidate most aligned with the policies of Confederate President Jefferson Davis, helping him secure victory over his anti-administration rival Thomas Jefferson Chambers. At this stage of the war, the region west of the Mississippi river had been completely cut off from the rest of the Confederacy by a string of Union victories in 1863. Confederate General Edmund Kirby Smith was tasked with managing this huge area, consisting of Texas, Arkansas, Western Louisiana, Indian Territory, and Missouri without support or reinforcements from the other Confederate states.

Despite running as a pro-administration candidate, as governor Murrah frequently clashed with the Confederate military authorities, having disagreements over the impressment of slaves for military construction, the eligibility of men serving in the Texas militia for conscription, and the mandatory sale of Texas-grown cotton to the Confederate military for export.

Following further Southern defeats, the Confederate armies in other states began to surrender starting in April 1865. There was some discussion of the trans-Mississippi troops continuing to fight on, but General Smith surrendered his troops as well at Galveston on June 2, 1865.

Murrah initially believed that he could remain in office to transition Texas back into the United States, and he called for a state convention to restore Texas to the Union. However, when he learned that the Union Army was arresting the Confederate state governors, he fled to Mexico with other Confederate officials. Lieutenant Governor Fletcher Summerfield Stockdale filled the vacant post, acting as governor for five days, until provisional governor Andrew J. Hamilton assumed office in August 1865.

Murrah's health had always been poor, and the journey to Mexico proved too much for him. Murrah died in Monterrey on August 4, 1865, and his grave is located in the Panteon Municipal of Monterrey, Mexico.

== Family ==
Charles Murrah, the grandfather of Pendleton Murrah, was born in 1775 in Warren County, North Carolina. He traced his ancestry through his parents Charles and Margaret (Peggy) Murrah, and through them to his grandparents Lodowick and Mira Ann Jeter Murrah of Caroline County, Virginia.

In 1850 Murrah married Sue Ellen Taylor, daughter of a prominent Texas plantation owner. According to the 1860 census, they had no children.

Political offices
Preceded by Francis Lubbock	Governor of Texas; 1863–1865	Succeeded by Andrew J. Hamilton
