= 1863 Texas gubernatorial election =

- August 3, 1863
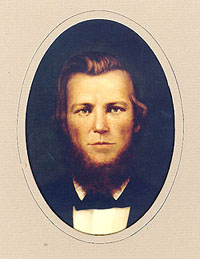

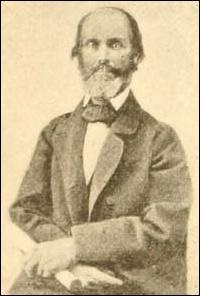
Nominee	Pendleton Murrah	Thomas Jefferson Chambers
Party	Independent	Independent
Alliance	Pro-Administration	Anti-Administration
Popular vote	17,511 (Note: The returns for Angelina, Jack, Mason, Smith, and Wood Counties were listed as "informal." Including them, the total would be 17,916 for Pendleton and 13,003 for Chambers.)	12,455
Percentage	56.42%	40.13%
- County Results (Note: No returns reported for Hardin, McCulloch and Zapata Counties. According to the Atlas of Historical County Borders, Greer County was disputed between Texas and the Indian Territory. A strip of territory was disputed between Jack and Clay Counties. Most other counties were unorganized.) Murrah 50–60% 60–70% 70–80% 80–90% >90% Chambers 50–60% 60–70% 70–80% 80–90% >90% Unknown/No Vote
Governor before election
Francis Lubbock
Independent
Elected Governor
Pendleton Murrah
Independent

The 1863 Texas gubernatorial election was held on August 3, 1863, to elect the governor of Texas. Harrison County attorney Pendleton Murrah, backed by incumbent Governor Francis Lubbock who chose not to run for a second term, defeated perennial candidate Thomas J. Chambers, a wealthy political gadfly from East Texas.

The major issue this election was each candidate's stance towards the Jefferson Davis administration. While each candidate tried to avoid being identified as "anti-administration" (or "anti-Davis") and "pro-administration" (or "pro-Davis"), public perception categorized them as such. Murrah was seen as the pro-administration candidate, while Chambers, who opposed sending more troops beyond Texas borders whilst the coastline remained undefended and denounced martial law, was viewed as the anti-administration candidate. Chambers also advocated for civil authority over military commanders, opposed restrictions on cotton cultivation, and opposed the "odious" draft exemption law.

Chambers hurt his own credibility during the campaign, throwing out accusations that statewide newspapers were conspiring against him to elect Murrah and that President Davis had dishonorably declined to respect his pleas for an army commission. Chambers received only about 1/4 of the votes he had garnered in the 1861 election, with many of his former supporters either not voting or defecting to Murrah. His base in this election was largely made up of a diverse protest vote that not only reflected resistance to conscription and annoyance with impressment, but also expressed the convictions of outspoken Texas-firsters and also the hopes of quiescent reconstructionists.

The Murrah campaign made a more practical or sensible effort, benefiting from the endorsement of Incumbent Governor Francis Lubbock and his supporters, most of whom were non-slaveholders, whilst Chambers carried the slaveholder vote. Murrah also received the backing of the Confederate military authorities in Shreveport, Louisiana who aided his candidacy by avoiding acts that could possibly turn discontented voters to Chambers, stipulating that they would not impress slaves and cotton in East Texas until after the election.

== Results ==
1863 Texas gubernatorial election
Party	Candidate	Votes	%
Independent	Pendleton Murrah	17,511	56.42%
Independent	Thomas J. Chambers	12,455	40.13%
Write-in		1,070	3.45%
Total votes		31,036	100.00%
Independent hold			
