= Mikal Watts =

American attorney and politician

Mikal Watts (born July 17, 1967 in Corpus Christi) is an American attorney from San Antonio, Texas and a prolific donor to the Texas and national Democratic Party, and candidates running for office as Democrats. He formed an exploratory committee to run for Senator of Texas against incumbent John Cornyn in the 2008 U.S. Senate elections, but announced on October 23, 2007 his decision not to run.

== Cases and trial record ==
As a trial lawyer he has represented plaintiffs in many of the highest-profile cases in the country over the past 15 years. His work involving defective Chrysler minivan lift gate latches resulted in a $262.5 million jury verdict. Chrysler recalled more than 4 million minivans. Together with Tab Turner, Watts spearheaded the litigation nationwide against Firestone Tire Company and Ford Motor Company for defective Firestone tire failures, causing rollover of Ford Explorer vehicles. By the close of the litigation, Watts and Turner had recovered hundreds of millions of dollars for their clients, and the two corporations had been forced to publicly apologize and to recall more than 17 million defective tires. Watts tried the first case in the country in some product defect litigations, including cases involving Rezulin, a diabetes drug that caused liver damage, which ultimately was recalled; Sulzer Hip Implants, where oily residue on implants caused the product to fail, and where his punitive damage verdict against the company led to a nationwide settlement of more than $1 billion involving the now-recalled defective implants; the drug Levaquin, where Watts obtained the only Plaintiffs' verdict in the United States. In total, Watts has achieved more than $1 billion in jury verdicts and arbitration awards, and more than $3 billion in settlement recoveries, on behalf of his clients.

Watts repeatedly has been named one of the top trial lawyers in the United States. Having tried cases in courtroom across the United States, Watts frequently lectures other lawyers at seminars across the country.

== Federal fraud trial ==
In September 2016, Watts was indicted on federal criminal fraud charges. The indictment alleged that he committed fraud when he signed up more than 40,000 clients along the coast after the 2010 Deepwater Horizon oil spill. He was charged with "fabricating thousands of clients, including the representation of a dog by the name of Lucy Lu."

Before he was indicted, Watts's law firm reached a settlement with BP for $2.3 billion on behalf of 41,000 seafood industry workers.

Watts' criminal trial began in July 2016. His brother was also a co-defendant. At the start of the trial, Watts fired his attorney and chose to represent himself in the case.

On August 18, the jury acquitted Watts and his co-defendants on all criminal charges. However, the jury found guilty several people that Watts hired in Mississippi to gather clients for his litigation against BP.

== Lawsuit against Watts for identity theft ==
On March 3, 2016, a $100 million lawsuit was filed for identify theft against two Texas attorneys (John Cracken of Dallas and Bob Hilliard of Corpus Christi) and one non-attorney (Max Duncan of Kerrville) in Harris County, Texas District Court. The attorneys were accused of using "case runners to steal the identities of Vietnamese-Americans damaged by spill." Duncan helped finance this effort. After the case was filed, Watts' name was added as a co-defendant. However, on September 13, Watts was non-suited, meaning he was removed from the lawsuit.

== Personal life ==
He has been married to Tammy, and the couple have three children, Taylor, Hailey, and Brandon. Watts has two brothers David and Guy, and one sister, Katy Watts. Watts and his wife are actively involved in their church, Oak Hills Church in San Antonio, pastored by Max Lucado and Randy Frazee. Watts and his wife Tammy founded Rapha God Ministries, a ministry they founded in order to provide free Christian prayer counseling to those in need.

Watts' mother is a Texas state district judge.

As of 2007, Watts opposed abortion and same-sex marriage, but supported civil unions for same-sex couples. He supported the expansion of federal funding for stem cell research.
