= 2006 Texas gubernatorial election =

- November 7, 2006
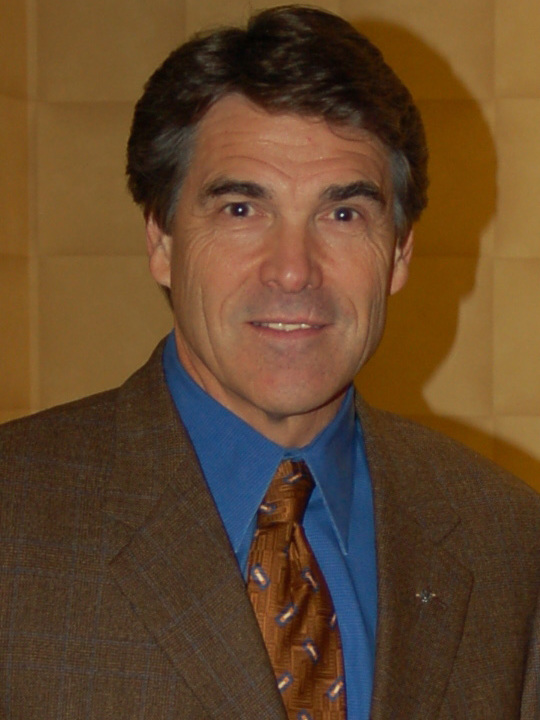

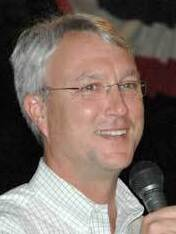

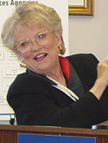

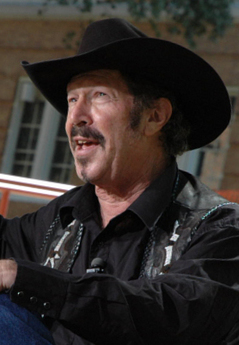
Nominee	Rick Perry	Chris Bell
Party	Republican	Democratic
Popular vote	1,716,803	1,310,353
Percentage	39.03%	29.79%
Nominee	Carole Keeton Strayhorn	Kinky Friedman
Party	Independent	Independent
Popular vote	797,577	546,869
Percentage	18.13%	12.43%
- County results Perry: 20–30% 30–40% 40–50% 50–60% 60–70% Bell: 30–40% 40–50% 50–60% 60–70% Strayhorn: 20–30% 30–40% 40–50%
Governor before election
Rick Perry
Republican
Elected Governor
Rick Perry
Republican

The 2006 Texas gubernatorial election was held on November 7, 2006, to elect the governor of Texas. The election was a rare five-way race, with incumbent Republican governor Rick Perry running for re-election against Democrat Chris Bell and Independents Carole Keeton Strayhorn and Kinky Friedman, as well as Libertarian nominee James Werner.

Perry was re-elected to a second full term in office, winning 39% of the vote to Bell's 30%, Strayhorn's 18%, and Friedman's 12%. This was lowest percentage of the popular vote that a Texas governor had received and still won the election since 1861. Perry carried 209 of the state's 254 counties, while Bell carried 39 and Strayhorn carried 6. (Note: Exit polls revealed that Perry won the white vote with 46%, while Bell got 22%, Strayhorn got 16% and Friedman got 15%. Bell won 63% of African Americans, while Perry got 16%, Strayhorn got 15% and Friedman got 4%. Bell also won the Latino vote with 41%, while Perry got 31%, Strayhorn got 18% and Friedman got 4%.)

Perry was inaugurated for a second full four-year term on January 16, 2007. The ceremony was held inside the House of Representatives chamber at the Texas Capitol after thunderstorms canceled the planned outdoor ceremony. This remains the last time Republicans won a statewide race in Texas with only a plurality.

To date, this is the most recent gubernatorial election where Swisher, Crosby, Fisher, Haskell, Red River, Morris, Marion, Newton, Bee, and Calhoun counties voted for the Democratic candidate, and the most recent in which Cooke, Nolan, Wilson, Goliad, and Wharton counties did not vote for the Republican candidate.

== Background ==
Incumbent Rick Perry became governor in late 2000 when then-Governor George W. Bush resigned following his election as President of the United States. He had been elected lieutenant governor in 1998. Perry was subsequently elected governor in his own right in 2002 and was seeking a second full term in 2006.

Perry's overall poll ratings had plummeted since the 2002 election, plagued by budget woes, battles over school financing reform, and a contentious and controversial redistricting battle. His approval rating dropped to 38% during the latter part of the 2005 legislative session.

== Republican primary ==
=== Candidates ===
- Star Locke
- Larry Kilgore, advocate for Texas secession
- Rick Perry, incumbent governor since 2000
- Rhett Smith

==== Withdrew ====
- Carole Keeton Strayhorn, Texas Comptroller and former Railroad Commissioner and mayor of Austin (withdrew December 2005, ran as independent)

==== Declined ====
- Kay Bailey Hutchison, U.S. senator since 1993 (ran for re-election)

=== Campaign ===
The race was initially expected to be a contentious three-way primary between Perry, Comptroller of Public Accounts Carole Keeton Strayhorn, and U.S. senator Kay Bailey Hutchison. Hutchison declined to run for governor in late 2005, instead opting to run for re-election to the Senate. This left Strayhorn and Perry vying for the GOP nomination. Believing her chances to be better running as an independent and appealing directly to voters, rather than those of the Republican Party first, she announced her intent to challenge him in the general election instead. Had she run in the primary, the December 2005 Scripps Howard Texas Poll of match ups had Perry in the lead against Strayhorn by a 55%-24% margin.

Despite weak polling numbers, Perry had the support of the Texas Republican Party. According to Perry's campaign website, he gained 142 separate endorsements. Perry had endorsements from virtually the entire Texas Republican congressional delegation (all but two members), every Republican statewide officeholder (except Strayhorn and judicial officeholders, who by law cannot endorse political candidates), 51 of the 62 members of the Texas Republican Party executive committee, and nearly every major Texas pro-business, fiscal conservative, and social conservative organization and PAC. Perry even managed to gain the endorsement of the Teamsters Union, notwithstanding Texas's strong right to work laws.

=== Results ===
Republican primary results
Party	Candidate	Votes	%
Republican	Rick Perry (incumbent)	552,545	84.23
Republican	Larry Kilgore	50,119	7.64
Republican	Rhett Smith	30,255	4.60
Republican	Star Locke	23,030	3.51
Total votes		655,919	100.00

== Democratic primary ==
=== Candidates ===
- Chris Bell, former U.S. representative from Houston and member of the Houston City Council
- Bob Gammage, former justice of the Texas Supreme Court and U.S. representative from Houston
- Rashad Jafer

Chris Bell, a former congressman from Houston, had been defeated in his party's 2004 primary after the controversial mid-decade redistricting in the state. Bell announced his run in July 2005.

=== Results ===
Democratic primary results
Party	Candidate	Votes	%
Democratic	Chris Bell	324,869	63.87
Democratic	Bob Gammage	145,081	28.53
Democratic	Rashad Jafer	38,652	7.60
Total votes		508,602	100.00

== General election ==
=== Candidates ===
- Chris Bell, former U.S. representative from Houston and member of the Houston City Council (Democratic)
- James "Patriot" Dillon (Independent) (write-in)
- Kinky Friedman, country singer and mystery author (Independent)
- Rick Perry, incumbent governor since 2001 (Republican)
- Carole Keeton Strayhorn, Texas Comptroller and former Railroad Commissioner and mayor of Austin (Independent)
- James Werner, sales consultant and candidate for U.S. House in 2004 (Libertarian)

Kinky Friedman, an independent candidate, claimed that country-music lovers, college students, animal lovers, ranchers, and anyone who did not vote in the last election were among his supporters.

=== Campaign ===
Bell's official strategy was to get Democrats to unite behind and vote for a Democrat, predicting (and betting on) a splintering of the Republican vote among Perry, Strayhorn, and Friedman, giving the Democrats the needed plurality to win the election. Running on a platform of ethics reform and education issues, he stayed with the pack of three candidates with better name recognition. After a good debate performance, his poll numbers improved significantly to where he had taken second place in nearly every poll afterward.

Friedman briefly enjoyed a high standing in the polls, and surpassed Democrat Chris Bell for second place by Independence Day. As election day drew near, the Friedman campaign fizzled out as much of his wide support was among young voters. He finished fourth in the election with under 13% of the vote. His website claimed that "he doesn't put much stock in unscientific political polls among "likely" voters, saying, "It's Kinky Friedman versus apathy". Friedman stated during the campaign that he was going after the 71% who had not made it to the polls in 2002.

Perry's position in polling improved during the campaign, with a 44% approval rating and 51% disapproving as of September 2006.

=== Debates ===
2006 Texas governor debates
No.	Date	Host	Link	Participants				
Key: P Participant A Absent N Non-invitee W Withdrawn								
Key: P Participant A Absent N Non-invitee W Withdrawn				Rick Perry	Chris Bell	Carole Keeton Strayhorn	Kinky Friedman	James Werner
1	October 6, 2006	KERA-TV		P	P	P	P	N

=== Predictions ===
Source	Ranking	As of
The Cook Political Report	Likely R	November 6, 2006
Sabato's Crystal Ball	Safe R	November 6, 2006
Rothenberg Political Report	Likely R	November 2, 2006
Real Clear Politics	Likely R	November 6, 2006

=== Endorsements ===
Chris Bell (D)

Individuals

- Wesley Clark, general, 2004 Democratic presidential candidate

=== Polling ===
Graphical summary

View source data.

Source	Date	MoE	Bell (D)	Friedman (I)	Perry (R)	Strayhorn (I)	Werner (L)
WSJ/Zogby	October 31, 2006	±2.9%	28.5%	14.4%	36.7%	15%	2.1%
Houston Chronicle/KHOU	October 29, 2006	±3.2%	22%	10.5%	38%	21%	1%
Rasmussen	October 27, 2006	±4.5%	25%	12%	36%	22%	N/A
SurveyUSA	October 24, 2006	±4.3%	26%	16%	36%	19%	1%
WSJ/Zogby	October 19, 2006	±3%	26.2%	13.2%	37.5%	13%	3.9%
Dallas Morning News	October 5, 2006	±3.5%	15%	14%	38%	18%	N/A
WSJ/Zogby	September 25, 2006	±2.6%	22.3%	18.9%	33%	15.5%	1.5%
Survey USA	September 19, 2006	±4.3%	23%	23%	35%	15%	2%
Rasmussen	September 13, 2006	±4.5%	18%	16%	33%	22%	N/A
WSJ/Zogby	September 5, 2006	±2.9%	25.3%	22.4%	30.7%*	11.1%	2.6%
WSJ/Zogby	August 28, 2006	N/A	23.1%	22.7%	34.8%	9.6%	N/A
Rasmussen	August 9, 2006	±4.5%	18%	18%	35%	18%	N/A
Rasmussen	July 24, 2006	±4.5%	13%	19%	40%	20%	N/A
WSJ/Zogby	July 24, 2006	N/A	20.8%	20.7%	38.3%	11%	N/A
Survey USA	June 26, 2006	±4.2%	20%	21%	35%	19%	N/A
WSJ/Zogby	June 21, 2006	N/A	19.7%	17.5%	37.7%	14.1%	N/A
Rasmussen	June 12, 2006	±4.5%	14%	20%	38%	19%	N/A
Survey USA	May 22, 2006	±4.1%	18%	16%	41%	20%	N/A
Survey USA	April 26, 2006	±4.2%	15%	16%	39%	25%	N/A
Rasmussen	April 20, 2006	±3%	17%	15%	40%	19%	N/A
WSJ/Zogby	March 30, 2006	N/A	20.7%	16.6%	36.3%	19%	N/A
Dallas Morning News	February 18, 2006	±3%	19%	10%	36%	16%	N/A
Rasmussen	February 14, 2006	±4.5%	13%	9%	40%	31%	N/A
Rasmussen	January 5, 2006	±4.5%	14%	12%	40%	21%	N/A

=== Results ===
Results for Kinky Friedman by county: Friedman: 0–5%; 5–10%; 10–15%; 15–20%; 20–25%; 25–30%

Texas election laws for general elections do not require a run-off in the event that a majority is not achieved, so Governor Perry joined only two other Texas governors to achieve the office by a plurality of less than 40%. The Texas gubernatorial elections of 1853 and 1861 were also won with less than 40% of the vote.

Strayhorn was seen as a moderate alternative to Perry, and found support among moderate Republicans and independent voters. Although a few polls had her tied for second going into election day, she finished with 18.13%.

2006 Texas gubernatorial election
Party	Candidate	Votes	%	±%
Republican	Rick Perry (incumbent)	1,716,803	39.03	▼18.78
Democratic	Chris Bell	1,310,353	29.79	▼10.17
Independent	Carole Keeton Strayhorn	797,577	18.13	N/A
Independent	Richard "Kinky" Friedman	546,869	12.43	N/A
Libertarian	James Werner	26,748	0.61	▼0.86
Write-ins	James "Patriot" Dillon (write-in)	718	0.02	N/A
Margin of victory		406,450	9.24	▼8.61
Turnout		4,399,068	35.01	▼3.40
Republican hold				

==== Results by county ====
County	Rick Perry Republican		Chris Bell Democratic		Carole Keeton Strayhorn Independent		Richard 'Kinky' Friedman Independent		James Werner Libertarian		Write-ins		Margin		Total
County	#	%	#	%	#	%	#	%	#	%	#	%	#	%	Total
Anderson	4,305	40.46%	2,496	23.46%	2,751	25.85%	1,035	9.73%	54	0.51%	0	0.00%	1,554	14.61%	10,641
Andrews	1,282	49.10%	352	13.48%	685	26.24%	284	10.88%	8	0.31%	0	0.00%	597	22.86%	2,611
Angelina	8,788	40.06%	6,618	30.17%	4,170	19.01%	2,228	10.16%	129	0.59%	6	0.03%	2,170	9.89%	21,939
Aransas	3,051	44.87%	1,349	19.84%	1,140	16.77%	1,223	17.99%	36	0.53%	0	0.00%	1,702	25.03%	6,799
Archer	1,335	45.53%	419	14.29%	853	29.09%	315	10.74%	10	0.34%	0	0.00%	482	16.44%	2,932
Armstrong	324	47.44%	71	10.40%	132	19.33%	151	22.11%	5	0.73%	0	0.00%	173	25.33%	683
Atascosa	2,423	31.26%	2,040	26.32%	1,934	24.95%	1,314	16.95%	41	0.53%	0	0.00%	383	4.94%	7,752
Austin	2,908	36.53%	1,377	17.30%	2,284	28.69%	1,354	17.01%	35	0.44%	3	0.04%	624	7.84%	7,961
Bailey	692	45.44%	284	18.65%	331	21.73%	202	13.26%	13	0.85%	1	0.07%	361	23.71%	1,523
Bandera	2,595	39.46%	881	13.40%	1,192	18.13%	1,853	28.18%	53	0.81%	2	0.03%	742	11.28%	6,576
Bastrop	5,216	30.50%	5,709	33.38%	2,962	17.32%	3,057	17.88%	156	0.91%	2	0.01%	-493	-2.88%	17,102
Baylor	396	40.33%	202	20.57%	283	28.82%	98	9.98%	3	0.31%	0	0.00%	113	11.51%	982
Bee	2,300	32.72%	2,489	35.41%	1,430	20.34%	774	11.01%	34	0.48%	3	0.04%	-189	-2.69%	7,030
Bell	17,633	40.72%	10,404	24.03%	10,717	24.75%	4,276	9.88%	242	0.56%	27	0.06%	6,916	15.97%	43,299
Bexar	92,387	33.71%	86,906	31.71%	57,150	20.85%	35,596	12.99%	1,955	0.71%	87	0.03%	5,481	2.00%	274,081
Blanco	1,411	42.09%	709	21.15%	598	17.84%	612	18.26%	22	0.66%	0	0.00%	702	20.94%	3,352
Borden	118	46.09%	48	18.75%	56	21.88%	34	13.28%	0	0.00%	0	0.00%	62	24.21%	256
Bosque	2,099	37.18%	1,162	20.58%	1,559	27.62%	810	14.35%	15	0.27%	0	0.00%	540	9.56%	5,645
Bowie	7,936	43.12%	5,851	31.79%	3,019	16.40%	1,529	8.31%	60	0.33%	9	0.05%	2,085	11.33%	18,404
Brazoria	22,543	38.57%	13,661	23.38%	10,650	18.22%	11,250	19.25%	337	0.58%	0	0.00%	8,882	15.19%	58,441
Brazos	15,590	51.30%	6,449	21.22%	4,325	14.23%	3,772	12.41%	248	0.82%	4	0.01%	9,141	30.08%	30,388
Brewster	749	30.71%	722	29.60%	385	15.79%	559	22.92%	24	0.98%	0	0.00%	27	1.11%	2,439
Briscoe	220	39.29%	130	23.21%	133	23.75%	74	13.21%	3	0.54%	0	0.00%	87	15.54%	560
Brooks	224	19.28%	662	56.97%	181	15.58%	93	8.00%	2	0.17%	0	0.00%	-438	-37.69%	1,162
Brown	4,147	46.75%	1,647	18.57%	1,896	21.37%	1,118	12.60%	56	0.63%	7	0.08%	2,251	25.38%	8,871
Burleson	1,837	40.84%	1,178	26.19%	912	20.28%	544	12.09%	26	0.58%	1	0.02%	659	14.65%	4,498
Burnet	5,246	46.70%	2,330	20.74%	2,013	17.92%	1,537	13.68%	107	0.95%	0	0.00%	2,916	25.96%	11,233
Caldwell	2,502	32.16%	2,478	31.85%	1,520	19.54%	1,207	15.52%	70	0.90%	2	0.03%	24	0.31%	7,779
Calhoun	1,435	32.52%	1,496	33.90%	958	21.71%	505	11.44%	17	0.39%	2	0.05%	-61	-1.38%	4,413
Callahan	1,385	41.98%	574	17.40%	420	12.73%	900	27.28%	20	0.61%	0	0.00%	485	14.70%	3,299
Cameron	14,407	35.10%	14,327	34.90%	9,433	22.98%	2,581	6.29%	287	0.70%	16	0.04%	80	0.20%	41,051
Camp	1,254	41.39%	953	31.45%	561	18.51%	256	8.45%	6	0.20%	0	0.00%	301	9.94%	3,030
Carson	965	47.10%	287	14.01%	463	22.60%	327	15.96%	7	0.34%	0	0.00%	502	24.50%	2,049
Cass	2,758	37.00%	2,544	34.12%	1,550	20.79%	575	7.71%	27	0.36%	1	0.01%	214	2.88%	7,455
Castro	723	40.73%	471	26.54%	302	17.01%	274	15.44%	5	0.28%	0	0.00%	252	14.19%	1,775
Chambers	3,142	40.42%	1,577	20.29%	1,427	18.36%	1,587	20.42%	40	0.51%	0	0.00%	1,555	20.00%	7,773
Cherokee	4,847	43.22%	2,436	21.72%	2,823	25.17%	1,061	9.46%	47	0.42%	0	0.00%	2,024	18.05%	11,214
Childress	530	42.81%	280	22.62%	254	20.52%	170	13.73%	4	0.32%	0	0.00%	250	20.19%	1,238
Clay	1,530	43.32%	613	17.36%	939	26.59%	438	12.40%	11	0.31%	1	0.03%	591	16.73%	3,532
Cochran	356	39.69%	174	19.40%	220	24.53%	137	15.27%	10	1.11%	0	0.00%	136	15.16%	897
Coke	522	45.87%	182	15.99%	260	22.85%	163	14.32%	11	0.97%	0	0.00%	262	23.02%	1,138
Coleman	939	40.72%	430	18.65%	598	25.93%	324	14.05%	15	0.65%	0	0.00%	341	14.79%	2,306
Collin	67,813	49.11%	32,457	23.50%	21,467	15.55%	15,340	11.11%	1,011	0.73%	0	0.00%	35,356	25.61%	138,088
Collingsworth	486	45.21%	201	18.70%	261	24.28%	121	11.26%	6	0.56%	0	0.00%	225	20.93%	1,075
Colorado	1,803	32.11%	1,213	21.60%	1,743	31.04%	832	14.82%	24	0.43%	0	0.00%	60	1.07%	5,615
Comal	13,551	47.59%	4,616	16.21%	5,491	19.28%	4,570	16.05%	244	0.86%	5	0.02%	8,060	28.31%	28,477
Comanche	1,408	39.61%	1,000	28.13%	668	18.79%	458	12.88%	18	0.51%	3	0.08%	408	11.48%	3,555
Concho	373	44.67%	169	20.24%	124	14.85%	167	20.00%	2	0.24%	0	0.00%	204	24.43%	835
Cooke	3,297	32.82%	1,817	18.09%	3,908	38.90%	977	9.72%	48	0.48%	0	0.00%	-611	-6.08%	10,047
Coryell	4,279	44.10%	2,030	20.92%	2,243	23.11%	1,096	11.29%	54	0.56%	2	0.02%	2,036	20.99%	9,704
Cottle	209	32.86%	166	26.10%	129	20.28%	126	19.81%	6	0.94%	0	0.00%	43	6.76%	636
Crane	488	44.81%	182	16.71%	286	26.26%	123	11.29%	10	0.92%	0	0.00%	202	18.55%	1,089
Crockett	502	48.04%	220	21.05%	143	13.68%	173	16.56%	7	0.67%	0	0.00%	282	26.99%	1,045
Crosby	447	32.04%	467	33.48%	294	21.08%	178	12.76%	9	0.65%	0	0.00%	-20	-1.44%	1,395
Culberson	170	39.81%	122	28.57%	63	14.75%	68	15.93%	4	0.94%	0	0.00%	48	11.24%	427
Dallam	439	50.69%	97	11.20%	152	17.55%	177	20.44%	1	0.12%	0	0.00%	262	30.25%	866
Dallas	143,132	35.24%	161,886	39.85%	57,581	14.18%	41,330	10.17%	2,172	0.53%	110	0.03%	-18,754	-4.61%	406,211
Dawson	1,397	43.96%	767	24.13%	625	19.67%	362	11.39%	27	0.85%	0	0.00%	630	19.83%	3,178
Deaf Smith	1,237	45.31%	525	19.23%	635	23.26%	327	11.98%	6	0.22%	0	0.00%	602	22.05%	2,730
Delta	577	37.79%	433	28.36%	335	21.94%	176	11.53%	6	0.39%	0	0.00%	144	9.43%	1,527
Denton	50,888	46.90%	25,156	23.18%	18,300	16.86%	13,536	12.47%	629	0.58%	4	0.00%	25,732	23.72%	108,513
DeWitt	1,449	35.50%	795	19.48%	1,243	30.45%	580	14.21%	15	0.37%	0	0.00%	206	5.05%	4,082
Dickens	230	37.64%	151	24.71%	128	20.95%	96	15.71%	6	0.98%	0	0.00%	79	12.93%	611
Dimmit	443	24.14%	900	49.05%	324	17.66%	158	8.61%	10	0.54%	0	0.00%	-457	-24.91%	1,835
Donley	538	42.63%	170	13.47%	292	23.14%	258	20.44%	4	0.32%	0	0.00%	246	19.49%	1,262
Duval	526	16.22%	2,087	64.37%	221	6.82%	395	12.18%	13	0.40%	0	0.00%	-1,561	-48.15%	3,242
Eastland	2,073	44.07%	898	19.09%	1,230	26.15%	481	10.23%	21	0.45%	1	0.02%	843	17.92%	4,704
Ector	8,843	49.90%	2,748	15.51%	4,003	22.59%	2,031	11.46%	94	0.53%	1	0.01%	4,840	27.31%	17,720
Edwards	346	46.63%	116	15.63%	173	23.32%	100	13.48%	6	0.81%	1	0.13%	173	23.31%	742
Ellis	12,738	43.41%	5,833	19.88%	6,799	23.17%	3,810	12.98%	140	0.48%	22	0.07%	5,939	20.24%	29,342
El Paso	29,989	33.06%	32,854	36.21%	17,973	19.81%	9,386	10.35%	517	0.57%	4	0.00%	-2,865	-3.15%	90,723
Erath	3,372	43.53%	1,676	21.64%	1,762	22.75%	892	11.52%	44	0.57%	0	0.00%	1,610	20.78%	7,746
Falls	853	23.30%	982	26.82%	1,508	41.19%	299	8.17%	19	0.52%	0	0.00%	-526	-14.37%	3,661
Fannin	2,819	37.50%	2,261	30.08%	1,531	20.37%	862	11.47%	44	0.59%	0	0.00%	558	7.42%	7,517
Fayette	2,492	32.00%	1,801	23.13%	2,242	28.79%	1,212	15.56%	35	0.45%	5	0.06%	250	3.21%	7,787
Fisher	317	26.44%	455	37.95%	331	27.61%	93	7.76%	3	0.25%	0	0.00%	-124	-10.34%	1,199
Floyd	877	42.00%	530	25.38%	455	21.79%	217	10.39%	8	0.38%	1	0.05%	347	16.62%	2,088
Foard	87	22.89%	166	43.68%	97	25.53%	28	7.37%	2	0.53%	0	0.00%	-69	-18.15%	380
Fort Bend	39,819	40.46%	33,241	33.77%	14,454	14.68%	10,414	10.58%	491	0.50%	8	0.01%	6,578	6.69%	98,427
Franklin	1,447	46.24%	649	20.74%	700	22.37%	312	9.97%	21	0.67%	0	0.00%	747	23.87%	3,129
Freestone	1,933	43.78%	976	22.11%	1,054	23.87%	429	9.72%	23	0.52%	0	0.00%	879	19.91%	4,415
Frio	530	25.11%	729	34.53%	587	27.81%	255	12.08%	7	0.33%	3	0.14%	-142	-6.72%	2,111
Gaines	1,202	48.70%	475	19.25%	472	19.12%	306	12.40%	13	0.53%	0	0.00%	727	29.45%	2,468
Galveston	21,072	32.28%	19,926	30.53%	10,417	15.96%	13,552	20.76%	299	0.46%	5	0.01%	1,146	1.75%	65,271
Garza	522	44.92%	200	17.21%	277	23.84%	153	13.17%	9	0.77%	1	0.09%	245	21.08%	1,162
Gillespie	4,375	52.06%	1,170	13.92%	1,385	16.48%	1,404	16.71%	61	0.73%	8	0.10%	2,971	35.35%	8,403
Glasscock	169	50.90%	27	8.13%	86	25.90%	50	15.06%	0	0.00%	0	0.00%	83	25.00%	332
Goliad	657	27.40%	659	27.48%	678	28.27%	396	16.51%	7	0.29%	1	0.04%	-19	-0.79%	2,398
Gonzales	1,494	35.69%	899	21.48%	1,246	29.77%	531	12.69%	15	0.36%	1	0.02%	248	5.92%	4,186
Gray	3,104	57.67%	550	10.22%	998	18.54%	709	13.17%	21	0.39%	0	0.00%	2,106	39.13%	5,382
Grayson	11,945	45.74%	6,852	26.24%	4,304	16.48%	2,865	10.97%	149	0.57%	1	0.00%	5,093	19.50%	26,116
Gregg	10,834	48.09%	4,851	21.53%	5,349	23.74%	1,404	6.23%	91	0.40%	1	0.00%	5,485	24.35%	22,530
Grimes	1,766	32.59%	1,361	25.12%	1,345	24.82%	903	16.66%	43	0.79%	1	0.02%	405	7.47%	5,419
Guadalupe	10,324	41.55%	5,094	20.50%	5,658	22.77%	3,561	14.33%	207	0.83%	3	0.01%	4,666	18.78%	24,847
Hale	2,678	42.34%	1,674	26.47%	1,267	20.03%	678	10.72%	28	0.44%	0	0.00%	1,004	15.87%	6,325
Hall	335	36.14%	227	24.49%	204	22.01%	158	17.04%	3	0.32%	0	0.00%	108	11.65%	927
Hamilton	1,093	38.32%	636	22.30%	688	24.12%	427	14.97%	8	0.28%	0	0.00%	405	14.20%	2,852
Hansford	782	54.57%	125	8.72%	292	20.38%	221	15.42%	13	0.91%	0	0.00%	490	34.19%	1,433
Hardeman	553	38.73%	325	22.76%	345	24.16%	194	13.59%	11	0.77%	0	0.00%	208	14.57%	1,428
Hardin	5,244	50.82%	2,100	20.35%	1,659	16.08%	1,283	12.43%	33	0.32%	0	0.00%	3,144	30.47%	10,319
Harris	215,150	36.51%	203,102	34.46%	86,890	14.74%	80,808	13.71%	3,378	0.57%	20	0.00%	12,048	2.05%	589,348
Harrison	6,244	41.66%	3,857	25.74%	3,928	26.21%	912	6.09%	43	0.29%	3	0.02%	2,316	15.45%	14,987
Hartley	665	52.90%	161	12.81%	213	16.95%	217	17.26%	1	0.08%	0	0.00%	448	35.64%	1,257
Haskell	539	31.12%	572	33.03%	465	26.85%	150	8.66%	6	0.35%	0	0.00%	-33	-1.91%	1,732
Hays	10,591	33.90%	9,845	31.51%	4,955	15.86%	5,457	17.47%	395	1.26%	1	0.00%	746	2.39%	31,244
Hemphill	532	44.93%	131	11.06%	289	24.41%	227	19.17%	4	0.34%	1	0.08%	243	20.52%	1,184
Henderson	7,715	42.46%	3,942	21.70%	4,118	22.66%	2,332	12.83%	63	0.35%	0	0.00%	3,597	19.80%	18,170
Hidalgo	16,029	33.52%	20,404	42.67%	8,403	17.57%	2,644	5.53%	341	0.71%	0	0.00%	-4,375	-9.15%	47,821
Hill	3,192	34.52%	2,130	23.04%	2,767	29.93%	1,101	11.91%	51	0.55%	5	0.05%	425	4.59%	9,246
Hockley	2,081	45.16%	871	18.90%	920	19.97%	710	15.41%	24	0.52%	2	0.04%	1,161	25.19%	4,608
Hood	6,770	48.14%	2,988	21.25%	2,564	18.23%	1,670	11.88%	69	0.49%	2	0.01%	3,782	26.89%	14,063
Hopkins	3,379	39.90%	2,361	27.88%	1,764	20.83%	939	11.09%	24	0.28%	1	0.01%	1,018	12.02%	8,468
Houston	2,650	44.45%	1,452	24.35%	1,264	21.20%	573	9.61%	21	0.35%	2	0.03%	1,198	20.10%	5,962
Howard	2,652	39.06%	1,424	20.97%	2,009	29.59%	650	9.57%	50	0.74%	5	0.07%	643	9.47%	6,790
Hudspeth	274	50.65%	80	14.79%	87	16.08%	94	17.38%	6	1.11%	0	0.00%	180	33.27%	541
Hunt	7,731	43.66%	3,899	22.02%	3,781	21.35%	2,228	12.58%	68	0.38%	0	0.00%	3,832	21.64%	17,707
Hutchinson	2,904	53.19%	730	13.37%	1,047	19.18%	745	13.64%	34	0.62%	0	0.00%	1,857	34.01%	5,460
Irion	240	46.15%	105	20.19%	62	11.92%	109	20.96%	4	0.77%	0	0.00%	131	25.19%	520
Jack	979	44.76%	378	17.28%	571	26.11%	244	11.16%	15	0.69%	0	0.00%	408	18.65%	2,187
Jackson	1,058	31.49%	862	25.65%	1,016	30.24%	405	12.05%	17	0.51%	2	0.06%	42	1.25%	3,360
Jasper	3,341	44.57%	2,147	28.64%	1,317	17.57%	666	8.88%	23	0.31%	2	0.03%	1,194	15.93%	7,496
Jeff Davis	378	35.43%	293	27.46%	178	16.68%	208	19.49%	10	0.94%	0	0.00%	85	7.97%	1,067
Jefferson	17,110	36.58%	18,519	39.59%	6,600	14.11%	4,373	9.35%	158	0.34%	15	0.03%	-1,409	-3.01%	46,775
Jim Hogg	310	33.01%	466	49.63%	111	11.82%	46	4.90%	6	0.64%	0	0.00%	-156	-16.62%	939
Jim Wells	2,122	28.17%	3,705	49.19%	1,072	14.23%	605	8.03%	28	0.37%	0	0.00%	-1,583	-21.02%	7,532
Johnson	12,989	43.28%	6,399	21.32%	6,450	21.49%	4,038	13.45%	129	0.43%	9	0.03%	6,539	21.79%	30,014
Jones	1,298	34.01%	964	25.26%	1,126	29.50%	398	10.43%	28	0.73%	3	0.08%	172	4.51%	3,817
Karnes	1,013	31.74%	851	26.66%	818	25.63%	482	15.10%	22	0.69%	6	0.19%	162	5.08%	3,192
Kaufman	7,910	41.51%	4,375	22.96%	4,344	22.80%	2,342	12.29%	84	0.44%	0	0.00%	3,535	18.55%	19,055
Kendall	5,120	49.47%	1,346	13.00%	1,966	19.00%	1,827	17.65%	90	0.87%	1	0.01%	3,154	30.47%	10,350
Kenedy	68	47.22%	42	29.17%	25	17.36%	8	5.56%	1	0.69%	0	0.00%	26	18.05%	144
Kent	105	36.08%	85	29.21%	51	17.53%	50	17.18%	0	0.00%	0	0.00%	20	6.87%	291
Kerr	7,711	49.44%	2,325	14.91%	2,437	15.63%	3,035	19.46%	62	0.40%	26	0.17%	4,676	29.98%	15,596
Kimble	662	47.29%	223	15.93%	262	18.71%	248	17.71%	5	0.36%	0	0.00%	400	28.58%	1,400
King	38	44.71%	12	14.12%	22	25.88%	13	15.29%	0	0.00%	0	0.00%	16	18.83%	85
Kinney	441	40.24%	279	25.46%	197	17.97%	172	15.69%	5	0.46%	2	0.18%	162	14.78%	1,096
Kleberg	1,806	36.21%	1,674	33.57%	948	19.01%	539	10.81%	20	0.40%	0	0.00%	132	2.64%	4,987
Knox	336	37.33%	237	26.33%	212	23.56%	113	12.56%	2	0.22%	0	0.00%	99	11.00%	900
Lamar	4,600	39.85%	3,498	30.30%	2,259	19.57%	1,140	9.88%	40	0.35%	7	0.06%	1,102	9.55%	11,544
Lamb	1,161	43.16%	590	21.93%	598	22.23%	330	12.27%	11	0.41%	0	0.00%	563	20.93%	2,690
Lampasas	2,490	49.33%	905	17.93%	1,042	20.64%	575	11.39%	36	0.71%	0	0.00%	1,448	28.69%	5,048
La Salle	304	27.44%	433	39.08%	232	20.94%	134	12.09%	5	0.45%	0	0.00%	-129	-11.64%	1,108
Lavaca	1,864	37.12%	1,118	22.27%	1,228	24.46%	775	15.44%	33	0.66%	3	0.06%	636	12.66%	5,021
Lee	1,380	32.39%	1,316	30.88%	933	21.90%	599	14.06%	32	0.75%	1	0.02%	64	1.51%	4,261
Leon	2,279	52.45%	771	17.74%	836	19.24%	431	9.92%	27	0.62%	1	0.02%	1,443	33.21%	4,345
Liberty	5,134	35.14%	3,306	22.63%	3,085	21.12%	3,037	20.79%	46	0.31%	1	0.01%	1,828	12.51%	14,609
Limestone	1,994	37.05%	1,503	27.93%	1,347	25.03%	510	9.48%	27	0.50%	1	0.02%	491	9.12%	5,382
Lipscomb	401	52.83%	103	13.57%	178	23.45%	74	9.75%	3	0.40%	0	0.00%	223	29.38%	759
Live Oak	1,210	42.88%	538	19.06%	573	20.30%	476	16.87%	25	0.89%	0	0.00%	637	22.58%	2,822
Llano	3,489	48.56%	1,303	18.14%	1,414	19.68%	933	12.99%	46	0.64%	0	0.00%	2,075	28.88%	7,185
Loving	45	50.00%	9	10.00%	22	24.44%	11	12.22%	3	3.33%	0	0.00%	23	25.56%	90
Lubbock	24,030	44.86%	11,484	21.44%	9,778	18.25%	7,963	14.87%	307	0.57%	2	0.00%	12,546	23.42%	53,564
Lynn	530	36.58%	394	27.19%	303	20.91%	219	15.11%	3	0.21%	0	0.00%	136	9.39%	1,449
McCulloch	936	44.76%	399	19.08%	468	22.38%	276	13.20%	12	0.57%	0	0.00%	468	22.38%	2,091
McLennan	19,451	36.59%	14,577	27.42%	14,283	26.87%	4,644	8.74%	199	0.37%	0	0.00%	4,874	9.17%	53,154
McMullen	142	32.95%	55	12.76%	120	27.84%	109	25.29%	5	1.16%	0	0.00%	22	5.11%	431
Madison	1,267	43.87%	704	24.38%	610	21.12%	290	10.04%	17	0.59%	0	0.00%	563	19.49%	2,888
Marion	759	33.27%	794	34.81%	507	22.23%	206	9.03%	15	0.66%	0	0.00%	-35	-1.54%	2,281
Martin	394	40.70%	115	11.88%	337	34.81%	118	12.19%	4	0.41%	0	0.00%	57	5.89%	968
Mason	589	43.96%	269	20.07%	299	22.31%	164	12.24%	19	1.42%	0	0.00%	290	21.65%	1,340
Matagorda	2,637	33.60%	2,083	26.54%	1,841	23.46%	1,253	15.97%	29	0.37%	5	0.06%	554	7.06%	7,848
Maverick	1,109	28.03%	1,888	47.72%%	690	17.44%	244	6.17%	23	0.58%	2	0.05%	-779	-19.69%	3,956
Medina	3,895	39.56%	1,908	19.38%	2,464	25.02%	1,515	15.39%	65	0.66%	0	0.00%	1,431	14.54%	9,847
Menard	422	47.36%	148	16.61%	120	13.47%	181	20.31%	20	2.24%	0	0.00%	241	27.05%	891
Midland	14,394	56.56%	2,922	11.48%	5,184	20.37%	2,773	10.90%	174	0.68%	1	0.00%	9,210	36.19%	25,448
Milam	1,707	30.76%	1,646	29.66%	1,477	26.61%	685	12.34%	29	0.52%	6	0.11%	61	1.10%	5,550
Mills	593	39.75%	331	22.18%	381	25.54%	177	11.86%	8	0.54%	2	0.13%	212	14.21%	1,492
Mitchell	499	34.97%	290	20.32%	493	34.55%	137	9.60%	7	0.49%	1	0.07%	6	0.42%	1,427
Montague	2,353	44.19%	1,036	19.46%	1,238	23.25%	663	12.45%	34	0.64%	1	0.02%	1,115	20.94%	5,325
Montgomery	41,066	50.81%	11,700	14.48%	13,786	17.06%	13,805	17.08%	452	0.56%	13	0.02%	27,261	33.73%	80,822
Moore	1,698	55.53%	402	13.15%	504	16.48%	440	14.39%	14	0.46%	0	0.00%	1,194	39.05%	3,058
Morris	886	30.63%	1,181	40.82%	637	22.02%	174	6.01%	14	0.48%	1	0.03%	-295	-10.19%	2,893
Motley	205	50.87%	75	18.61%	71	17.62%	46	11.41%	6	1.49%	0	0.00%	130	32.26%	403
Nacogdoches	5,425	43.38%	3,109	24.86%	2,219	17.74%	1,703	13.62%	46	0.37%	4	0.03%	2,316	18.52%	12,506
Navarro	4,296	38.87%	2,794	25.28%	2,571	23.26%	1,340	12.13%	47	0.43%	3	0.03%	1,502	13.59%	11,051
Newton	1,072	37.00%	1,153	39.80%	409	14.12%	253	8.73%	9	0.31%	1	0.03%	-81	-2.80%	2,897
Nolan	981	30.97%	731	23.07%	1,070	33.78%	378	11.93%	8	0.25%	0	0.00%	-89	-2.81%	3,168
Nueces	25,066	37.07%	20,931	30.95%	11,870	17.55%	9,423	13.93%	331	0.49%	2	0.00%	4,135	6.12%	67,623
Ochiltree	1,114	65.03%	114	6.65%	253	14.77%	221	12.90%	11	0.64%	0	0.00%	861	50.26%	1,713
Oldham	269	49.18%	62	11.33%	118	21.57%	97	17.73%	1	0.18%	0	0.00%	151	27.61%	547
Orange	7,377	42.62%	5,484	31.68%	2,658	15.36%	1,744	10.08%	47	0.27%	0	0.00%	1,893	10.94%	17,310
Palo Pinto	2,432	37.67%	1,577	24.43%	1,410	21.84%	1,000	15.49%	37	0.57%	0	0.00%	855	13.24%	6,456
Panola	2,586	44.35%	1,497	25.67%	1,449	24.85%	283	4.85%	16	0.27%	0	0.00%	1,089	18.68%	5,831
Parker	12,877	47.67%	5,178	19.17%	5,483	20.30%	3,344	12.38%	131	0.48%	0	0.00%	7,394	27.37%	27,013
Parmer	944	51.95%	251	13.81%	400	22.01%	209	11.50%	12	0.66%	1	0.06%	544	29.94%	1,817
Pecos	1,288	40.22%	833	26.01%	766	23.92%	291	9.09%	22	0.69%	2	0.06%	455	14.21%	3,202
Polk	4,653	38.84%	2,938	24.53%	2,238	18.68%	2,075	17.32%	72	0.60%	3	0.03%	1,715	14.31%	11,979
Potter	7,326	42.42%	3,395	19.66%	3,367	19.49%	3,044	17.62%	139	0.80%	1	0.01%	3,931	22.76%	17,272
Presidio	209	22.12%	419	44.34%	163	17.25%	147	15.56%	7	0.74%	0	0.00%	-210	-22.22%	945
Rains	1,128	39.52%	627	21.97%	699	24.49%	396	13.88%	4	0.14%	0	0.00%	429	15.03%	2,854
Randall	15,486	49.77%	4,232	13.60%	6,687	21.49%	4,552	14.63%	158	0.51%	3	0.01%	8,799	28.28%	31,118
Reagan	254	39.94%	107	16.82%	168	26.42%	103	16.19%	4	0.63%	0	0.00%	86	13.52%	636
Real	534	48.11%	168	15.14%	212	19.10%	191	17.21%	5	0.45%	0	0.00%	322	29.01%	1,110
Red River	1,145	34.15%	1,198	35.73%	705	21.03%	291	8.68%	14	0.42%	0	0.00%	-53	-1.58%	3,353
Reeves	712	33.60%	737	34.78%	487	22.98%	166	7.83%	17	0.80%	0	0.00%	-25	-1.18%	2,119
Refugio	705	35.90%	522	26.58%	424	21.59%	305	15.53%	8	0.41%	0	0.00%	183	9.32%	1,964
Roberts	173	56.35%	12	3.91%	60	19.54%	61	19.87%	1	0.33%	0	0.00%	112	36.48%	307
Robertson	1,791	35.89%	1,778	35.63%	982	19.68%	406	8.14%	32	0.64%	1	0.02%	13	0.26%	4,990
Rockwall	8,390	53.67%	2,757	17.64%	2,782	17.80%	1,631	10.43%	65	0.42%	8	0.05%	5,608	35.87%	15,633
Runnels	1,016	41.90%	408	16.82%	601	24.78%	388	16.00%	12	0.49%	0	0.00%	415	17.12%	2,425
Rusk	5,555	46.76%	2,536	21.35%	2,741	23.07%	978	8.23%	70	0.59%	0	0.00%	2,814	23.69%	11,880
Sabine	1,323	43.56%	763	25.12%	602	19.82%	331	10.90%	15	0.49%	3	0.10%	560	18.44%	3,037
San Augustine	929	38.15%	871	35.77%	401	16.47%	216	8.87%	16	0.66%	2	0.08%	58	2.38%	2,435
San Jacinto	2,246	34.52%	1,742	26.78%	1,345	20.67%	1,141	17.54%	31	0.48%	1	0.02%	504	7.74%	6,506
San Patricio	5,057	38.59%	4,208	32.11%	2,217	16.92%	1,565	11.94%	52	0.40%	4	0.03%	849	6.48%	13,103
San Saba	757	49.77%	265	17.42%	333	21.89%	159	10.45%	7	0.46%	0	0.00%	424	27.88%	1,521
Schleicher	336	48.14%	171	24.50%	91	13.04%	97	13.90%	3	0.43%	0	0.00%	165	23.64%	698
Scurry	1,331	47.57%	494	17.66%	659	23.55%	290	10.36%	24	0.86%	0	0.00%	672	24.02%	2,798
Shackelford	451	47.67%	133	14.06%	243	25.69%	115	12.16%	4	0.42%	0	0.00%	208	21.98%	946
Shelby	2,783	46.81%	1,563	26.29%	1,132	19.04%	452	7.60%	15	0.25%	0	0.00%	1,220	20.52%	5,945
Sherman	294	47.50%	72	11.63%	151	24.39%	99	15.99%	3	0.48%	0	0.00%	143	23.11%	619
Smith	23,701	54.75%	8,477	19.58%	6,973	16.11%	3,966	9.16%	169	0.39%	3	0.01%	15,224	35.17%	43,289
Somervell	1,067	42.14%	536	21.17%	553	21.84%	364	14.38%	11	0.43%	1	0.04%	514	20.30%	2,532
Starr	1,283	20.10%	4,215	66.05%	611	9.57%	216	3.38%	51	0.80%	6	0.09%	-2,932	-45.95%	6,382
Stephens	897	42.53%	408	19.35%	547	25.94%	248	11.76%	9	0.43%	0	0.00%	350	16.59%	2,109
Sterling	158	51.80%	42	13.77%	60	19.67%	45	14.75%	0	0.00%	0	0.00%	98	32.13%	305
Stonewall	136	25.19%	192	35.56%	149	27.59%	62	11.48%	1	0.19%	0	0.00%	-43	-7.97%	540
Sutton	537	48.33%	264	23.76%	153	13.77%	150	13.50%	6	0.54%	1	0.09%	273	24.57%	1,111
Swisher	463	27.87%	520	31.31%	383	23.06%	279	16.80%	16	0.96%	0	0.00%	-57	-3.44%	1,661
Tarrant	130,513	39.99%	101,402	31.07%	56,084	17.19%	36,770	11.27%	1,559	0.48%	9	0.00%	29,111	8.92%	326,337
Taylor	12,280	43.34%	5,127	18.09%	7,989	28.19%	2,793	9.86%	146	0.52%	0	0.00%	4,291	15.15%	28,335
Terrell	186	35.98%	179	34.62%	70	13.54%	74	14.31%	7	1.35%	1	0.19%	7	1.36%	517
Terry	1,015	40.65%	681	27.27%	446	17.86%	338	13.54%	16	0.64%	1	0.04%	334	13.38%	2,497
Throckmorton	187	38.01%	87	17.68%	154	31.30%	63	12.80%	1	0.20%	0	0.00%	33	6.71%	492
Titus	2,242	38.40%	1,851	31.71%	1,235	21.15%	484	8.29%	22	0.38%	4	0.07%	391	6.69%	5,838
Tom Green	10,987	50.92%	4,296	19.91%	2,740	12.70%	3,423	15.86%	127	0.59%	3	0.01%	6,691	31.01%	21,576
Travis	59,794	26.44%	101,989	45.09%	31,090	13.75%	30,519	13.49%	2,775	1.23%	9	0.00%	-42,195	-18.65%	226,176
Trinity	1,296	30.22%	1,259	29.36%	1,031	24.04%	681	15.88%	16	0.37%	5	0.12%	37	0.86%	4,288
Tyler	2,043	38.93%	1,494	28.47%	1,053	20.06%	634	12.08%	24	0.46%	0	0.00%	549	10.46%	5,248
Upshur	4,221	44.29%	2,230	23.40%	2,102	22.05%	938	9.84%	40	0.42%	0	0.00%	1,991	20.89%	9,531
Upton	292	45.98%	94	14.80%	185	29.13%	63	9.92%	1	0.16%	0	0.00%	107	16.85%	635
Uvalde	1,981	36.56%	1,582	29.20%	984	18.16%	846	15.61%	25	0.46%	0	0.00%	399	7.36%	5,418
Val Verde	2,651	36.45%	2,736	37.62%	1,184	16.28%	661	9.09%	36	0.49%	5	0.07%	-85	-1.17%	7,273
Van Zandt	5,695	45.91%	2,525	20.36%	2,629	21.19%	1,513	12.20%	38	0.31%	4	0.03%	3,066	24.72%	12,404
Victoria	7,757	41.37%	4,743	25.30%	4,152	22.14%	1,942	10.36%	120	0.64%	36	0.19%	3,014	16.07%	18,750
Walker	4,012	36.16%	2,600	23.43%	2,520	22.71%	1,882	16.96%	71	0.64%	11	0.10%	1,412	12.73%	11,096
Waller	2,389	29.50%	2,161	26.68%	2,382	29.41%	1,129	13.94%	37	0.46%	1	0.01%	7	0.09%	8,099
Ward	828	39.60%	361	17.26%	685	32.76%	205	9.80%	10	0.48%	2	0.10%	143	6.84%	2,091
Washington	3,867	41.10%	1,774	18.85%	1,882	20.00%	1,831	19.46%	53	0.56%	2	0.02%	1,985	21.10%	9,409
Webb	4,641	25.24%	9,254	50.32%	3,172	17.25%	1,222	6.64%	95	0.52%	7	0.04%	4,613	25.08%	18,391
Wharton	2,278	25.98%	2,396	27.32%	2,797	31.90%	1,256	14.32%	35	0.40%	7	0.08%	-401	-4.58%	8,769
Wheeler	671	51.14%	194	14.79%	239	18.22%	201	15.32%	7	0.53%	0	0.00%	432	32.92%	1,312
Wichita	12,475	45.40%	5,211	18.97%	6,824	24.84%	2,820	10.26%	136	0.49%	10	0.04%	5,651	20.56%	27,476
Wilbarger	1,405	41.32%	663	19.50%	873	25.68%	438	12.88%	21	0.62%	0	0.00%	532	15.64%	3,400
Willacy	712	34.68%	759	36.92%	442	21.50%	131	6.37%	11	0.54%	0	0.00%	-46	-2.24%	2,055
Williamson	35,956	42.79%	23,072	27.46%	14,242	16.95%	9,561	11.38%	1,179	1.40%	18	0.02%	12,884	15.33%	84,028
Wilson	2,989	27.33%	2,702	24.70%	3,456	31.60%	1,726	15.78%	65	0.59%	0	0.00%	-467	-4.27%	10,938
Winkler	641	42.79%	277	18.49%	401	26.77%	168	11.21%	11	0.73%	0	0.00%	240	16.02%	1,498
Wise	5,299	42.92%	2,610	21.14%	2,705	21.91%	1,669	13.52%	62	0.50%	0	0.00%	2,594	21.01%	12,345
Wood	5,641	50.01%	2,017	17.88%	2,321	20.58%	1,249	11.07%	48	0.43%	3	0.03%	3,320	29.43%	11,279
Yoakum	743	47.11%	275	17.44%	354	22.45%	194	12.30%	11	0.70%	0	0.00%	389	24.66%	1,577
Young	2,393	50.40%	851	17.92%	958	20.18%	521	10.97%	24	0.51%	1	0.02%	1,435	30.22%	4,748
Zapata	385	31.98%	648	53.82%	88	7.31%	77	6.40%	6	0.50%	0	0.00%	-263	-21.84%	1,204
Zavala	322	18.33%	1,078	61.35%	232	13.20%	110	6.26%	13	0.74%	2	0.11%	-756	-43.02%	1,757
Total	1,716,803	39.03%	1,310,353	29.79%	797,577	18.13%	546,869	12.43%	26,748	0.61%	718	0.02%	406,450	9.24%	4,399,068

County Flips: Democratic Hold Flip / Republican Hold Flip / Independent Flip

Counties that flipped from Democratic to Republican

- Cass (largest city: Atlanta)
- Cameron (largest city: Brownsville)
- Culberson (largest municipality: Van Horn)
- Kenedy (largest municipality: Sarita)
- Kleberg (largest municipality: Kingsville)
- Hudspeth (largest city: Fort Hancock)
- Pecos (largest city: Fort Stockton)
- Robertson (largest city: Hearne)
- Terrell (largest city: Sanderson)

Counties that flipped from Republican to Independent

- Cooke (largest city: Gainesville)
- Goliad (largest city: Goliad)
- Falls (largest city: Marlin)
- Nolan (largest city: Sweetwater)
- Wilson (largest city: Floresville)
- Wharton (largest city: El Campo)

Counties that flipped from Republican to Democratic

- Bastrop (largest city: Elgin)
- Calhoun (largest city: Port Lavaca)
- Crosby (largest city: Crosbyton)
- Dallas (largest city: Dallas)
- Stonewall (largest city: Aspermont)
- Swisher (largest city: Tulia)
- Red River (largest city: Clarksville)
- Haskell (largest city: Haskell)

== See also ==
- 2006 United States gubernatorial elections
