= Rick Noriega =

American politician

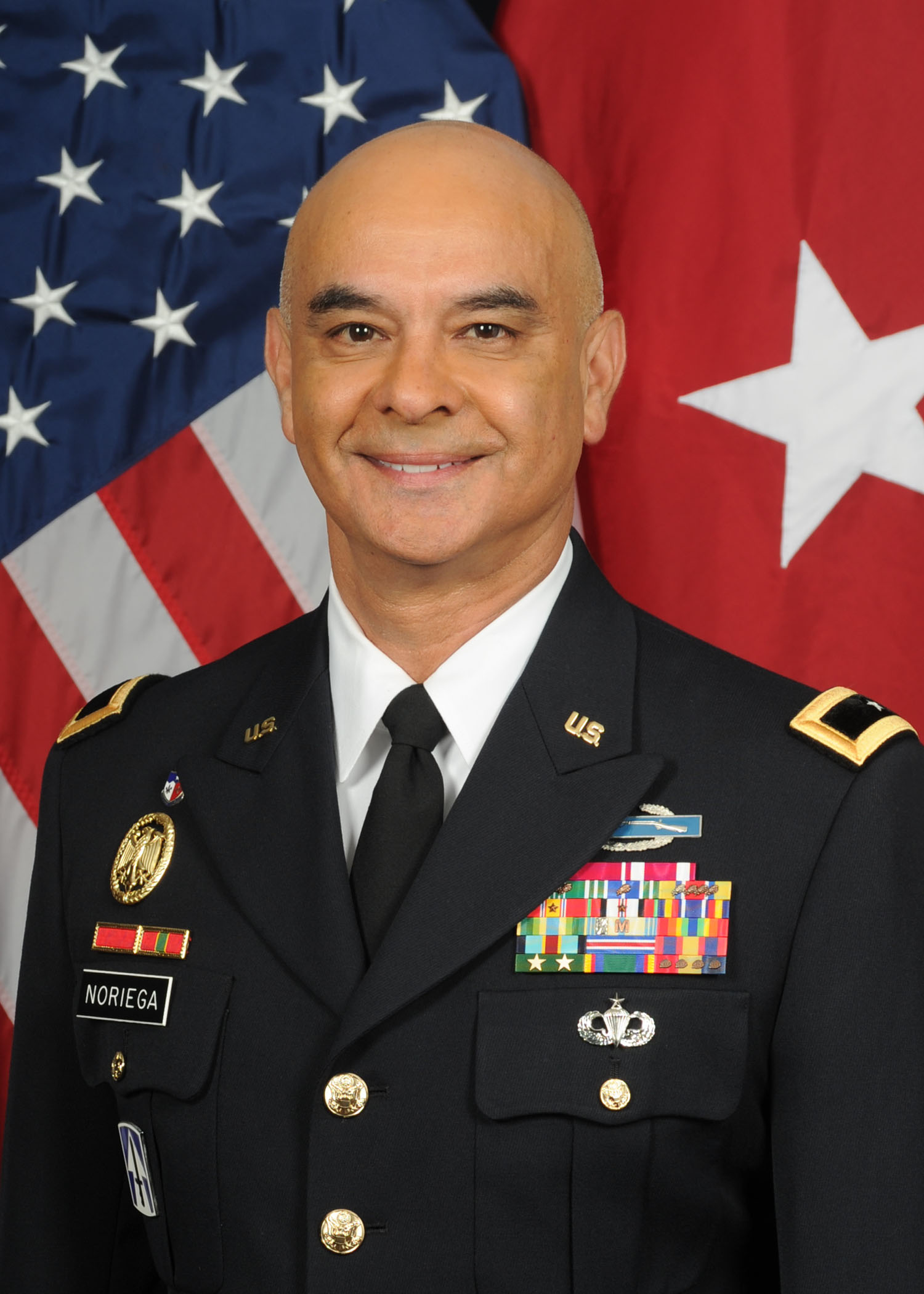
- Noriega in 2015

Member of the Texas House of Representatives from the 145th district
- In office January 14, 1999 – January 13, 2009
- Preceded by: Diana Davila
- Succeeded by: Carol Alvarado

Personal details
- Born: Richard Joel Noriega; January 8, 1958 (age 68) Houston, Texas, U.S.
- Party: Democratic
- Education: Alvin Community College (attended); University of Houston (BA); Harvard University (MPA)

Military service
- Branch/service: United States Army
- Years of service: 1979–2018
- Rank: Major General
- Unit: Texas Army National Guard
- Battles/wars: Operation Enduring Freedom

Richard Joel Noriega (born January 8, 1958) is a former American politician and retired major general in the Texas Army National Guard who served as a Democratic member of the Texas House of Representatives from 1999 to 2009.

In 2008, Noriega was the Democratic nominee for the United States Senate seat held by Republican John Cornyn. Cornyn would win reelection with 54.8% to Noriega's 42.8%.

== Early life and education ==
Noriega was born and raised in Houston. After graduating from Mount Carmel High School he attended Alvin Community College on a Rusk Athletic Scholarship where he played baseball. Noriega graduated from the University of Houston in 1984 with an ROTC Scholarship and was commissioned as a second lieutenant.

He graduated from Harvard University's John F. Kennedy School of Government in 1990. He also earned a certificate in advanced international affairs from the George Bush School at Texas A&M University. Noriega is also a graduate of the University of North Carolina's Certified Government Chief Information Officer Program. He graduated from the US Army War College where he completed his assignment as a Senior Fellow at the University of Texas. He also is a graduate of the U.S. Army Command and General Staff College,

== Military service ==
Noriega joined the United States Army in 1979 in the wake of the Iran hostage crisis. He became an officer in the Texas Army National Guard in 1984, and served in the Afghanistan War that followed the September 11, 2001 attacks.

On his return from Afghanistan, Mayor Bill White requested that Noriega command the evacuee shelter operation at the George Brown Convention Center in Houston, where he oversaw thousands of Hurricane Katrina evacuees. Noriega then commanded the Laredo Sector working with U.S. Border Patrol during Operation Jump Start.

Noriega's awards include: the Combat Infantryman Badge; Senior Parachutist Badge; Distinguished Service Medal; Legion of Merit; Meritorious Service Medal; Army Commendation Medal; Army Achievement Medal; Afghanistan Campaign Medal; and Global War on Terrorism Expeditionary Medal.,; the Legion of Merit; and the German Armed Forces Gold Badge for Military Proficiency. Rick Noriega retired from the Army in 2018.

== Public service ==
Noriega was a project manager for Communities in Schools, and taught in the Houston Independent School District and in the Houston Community College System before becoming a staff member for the Texas State Senate. In 1993 he joined the Government Affairs Department of Houston Industries, Inc. (now CenterPoint Energy, Inc.). He became a manager in the company's Economic Development Department after winning the Democratic nomination for Texas State Representative.

Noriega was elected to the Texas House of Representatives in 1998 and served five terms, 1999 to 2009. He acted as the Budget and Oversight Chair of the Defense Affairs and State-Federal Relations Committee, and also sat on the Appropriations Committee.

Noriega's House district was mostly Hispanic and low income, and included many residents who never completed high school.

He authored and sponsored more than 100 bills in the Texas Legislature. His major legislative accomplishment was authoring House Bill 1403, The Texas Dream Act, in 2001. The bill made Texas the first state to offer in-state tuition rates and financial assistance for certain immigrant students. It was a landmark policy. Over 22 states adopted similar laws, providing access to higher education to thousands.

== 2008 U.S. Senate campaign ==
Noriega narrowly avoided a runoff election by receiving 51 percent of the vote in the March 4, 2008 Democratic primary. His opponents were Gene Kelly (a perennial candidate), Ray McMurrey, and Rhett Smith. Prior to the filing deadline, trial attorney Mikal Watts withdrew from his bid for the Democratic nomination on October 23, 2007. Noriega faced Republican incumbent John Cornyn, who outraised him financially and who received 81 percent of the vote in the Republican primary, in the November 4 general election. Noriega was ultimately defeated by Cornyn in the general election.

== Personal life ==
Noriega is a Mexican American the father of two sons, and grandfather to 1 granddaughter, and 1 great granddaughter.

== Election results ==
=== 2008 United States Senate ===
2008 Texas U.S. Senate general election
Party	Candidate	Votes	%	±%
Republican	John Cornyn	4,337,469	54.82	−0.48
Democratic	Rick Noriega	3,389,365	42.83	−0.50
Libertarian	Yvonne Adams Schick	185,241	2.34	+1.55
Majority		948,104		
Turnout		7,912,075	58.28	
Republican hold		Swing		

2008 US Senate, Democratic Primary
Party	Candidate	Votes	%	±%
Democratic	Rick Noriega	1,108,318	51.01%	+0.00%
Democratic	Gene Kelly	583,845	26.87%	+0.00%
Democratic	Ray McMurrey	268,742	12.37%	+0.00%
Democratic	Rhett Smith	211,811	9.75%	+0.00%

=== 2006 State House 145 ===
2006 State House 145, General Election
Party	Candidate	Votes	%	±%
Democratic	Rick Noriega	7,773	100.00%	+0.00%

2006 State House 145, Democratic Primary
Party	Candidate	Votes	%	±%
Democratic	Rick Noriega	784	100.00%	+0.00%

=== 2004 State House 145 ===
2004 State House 145, General Election
Party	Candidate	Votes	%	±%
Democratic	Rick Noriega	15,160	100.00%	+0.00%

2004 State House 145, Democratic Primary
Party	Candidate	Votes	%	±%
Democratic	Rick Noriega	2,044	100.00%	+0.00%

=== 2002 State House 145 ===
2002 State House 145, General Election
Party	Candidate	Votes	%	±%
Democratic	Rick Noriega	11,087	100.00%	+28.57%

2002 State House 145, Democratic Primary
Party	Candidate	Votes	%	±%
Democratic	Rick Noriega	3,315	100.00%	+0.00%

=== 2000 State House 145 ===
2000 State House 145, General Election
Party	Candidate	Votes	%	±%
Democratic	Rick Noriega	12,158	71.43%	+4.31%
Republican	Michael Bunch	4,863	28.57%	−4.31%

2000 State House 145, Democratic Primary
Party	Candidate	Votes	%	±%
Democratic	Rick Noriega	1,381	100.00%	+40.93%

=== 1998 State House 145 ===
1998 State House 145, General Election
Party	Candidate	Votes	%	±%
Democratic	Rick Noriega	6,405	67.12%	
Republican	Michael Bunch	3,137	32.88%	

1998 State House 145, Democratic Primary
Party	Candidate	Votes	%	±%
Democratic	Rick Noriega	1,192	59.07%	
Democratic	Ben Mendez	488	24.18%	
Democratic	John Ray Harrison	213	10.56%	
Democratic	Jamie Bray	95	4.71%	
Democratic	Mark Sandoval	30	1.49%	

== Issues ==
=== Economy ===
Noriega proposed a comprehensive plan to help struggling families keep their homes during the 2008 economic downturn, focusing on revamping bankruptcy law, increased funding of counseling for struggling homeowners, and a tax credit of $2000 for homeowners who refinance into a fixed-rate loan. He also proposed funding to allow homeowners to refinance into FHA (Federal Housing Administration) backed loans, which generally provide lower rates of interest than private commercial loans.

=== Domestic security and immigration ===
Noriega served the National Guard as commander of the Laredo sector during Operation Jump Start, which deployed approximately 18,000 Guardsmen to the US/Mexico border in 2006 to provide increased border security until an improved immigration reform package could be approved on Capitol Hill. Noriega focused on curtailing human trafficking and drug smuggling at the border, and called for more advanced surveillance technology to be deployed at the border as well as for more Guardsmen to be deployed there. Noriega opposed the use of a border fence to curb illegal immigration and trafficking.

Noriega also authored HB 2546, a bill passed by the Texas legislature that restricts the sale of ammonium nitrate in order to prevent its use in criminal or terrorist activity such as the Oklahoma City bombing.

Noriega was selected to serve on the Military Leadership Diversity Commission by the Obama Administration which authored its March 15, 2011 report, "From Representation to Inclusion: Diversity Leadership for the 20th Century Military."

== Post-Senate race activities ==
In 2011 Noriega, then a colonel, was named commander of the Texas National Guard's 71st Theater Information Operations Group.

Noriega was selected for promotion to brigadier general in 2013 and assigned as Assistant Division Commander—Support for the 36th Infantry Division. He then served as the Assistant Adjutant General-Army for the Texas National Guard. Noriega retired effective January 31, 2018, and received an honorific promotion to major general on the state's retired list of National Guard officers.

In his civilian career Noriega was Chief Executive Officer of the Ronald McDonald House Houston, a non-profit organization that offers a home away from home for critically ill children receiving treatment and care in the Texas Medical Center. Effective September, 2020, Noriega became the Chief Information Officer for Harris County, Texas, the third most populous county in the United States.

== See also ==
- History of the Mexican-Americans in Houston

Party political offices
Preceded by Ron Kirk	Democratic nominee for U.S. Senator from Texas (Class 2); 2008	Succeeded by David Alameel
