= 1861 Texas gubernatorial election =

- August 5, 1861
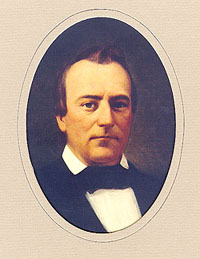

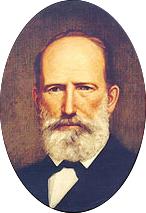

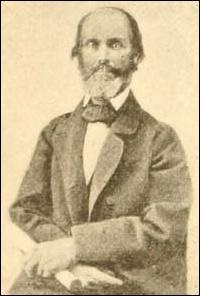
Nominee	Francis Lubbock	Edward Clark	Thomas J. Chambers
Party	Independent	Independent	Independent
Popular vote	21,854	21,730	13,759
Percentage	38.05%	37.84%	23.96%
- County Results (Note: No returns reported for Clay, Hidalgo and Mason counties. According to the Atlas of Historical County Borders, Greer County was disputed between Texas and the Indian Territory. A strip of territory was disputed between Jack and Clay Counties. Most other counties were unorganized.) Lubbock 30–40% 40–50% 50–60% 60–70% 70–80% 80–90% >90% Clark 30–40% 40–50% 50–60% 60–70% 70–80% 80–90% >90% Chambers 30–40% 40–50% 50–60% 60–70% 70–80% 80–90% Unknown/No Vote
Governor before election
Edward Clark
Independent
Elected Governor
Francis Lubbock
Independent

The 1861 Texas gubernatorial election was held on August 5 1861, to elect the governor of Texas. In a three-way election, former Democratic lieutenant governor Francis Lubbock defeated incumbent Governor Edward Clark and Thomas J. Chambers, a wealthy political gadfly from East Texas. All candidates were staunch secessionists, promising to wage vigorous war upon the North in cooperation with Confederate authorities.

Clark had elevated himself to the governorship after swearing an oath of loyalty to the Confederacy, following the previous Governor Sam Houston's removal due to his refusal to take such an oath. This move was seen by unionists as an affront to Houston, who did not recognize the validity of his removal. Despite being a secessionist himself, Lubbock was backed by Houston and Unionists in the election, who would rather vote for him than Clark. This backing, along with Lubbock's ability to appeal to former non-voters, particularly non-slaveholders, were the main factors that caused Clark's defeat by a slim margin of 124 votes.

== Results ==
1861 Texas gubernatorial election
Party	Candidate	Votes	%
Independent	Francis Lubbock	21,854	38.05%
Independent	Edward Clark (incumbent)	21,730	37.84%
Independent	Thomas J. Chambers	13,759	23.96%
Write-in		85	0.15%
Total votes		57,428	100.00%
Independent hold			
