= Edward Clark (Texas politician) =

Governor of Texas in 1861

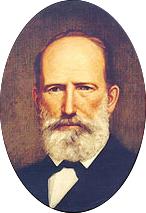

8th Governor of Texas
- In office March 16, 1861 – November 7, 1861
- Preceded by: Sam Houston
- Succeeded by: Francis Lubbock

7th Lieutenant Governor of Texas
- In office December 21, 1859 – March 16, 1861
- Governor: Sam Houston
- Preceded by: Francis Lubbock
- Succeeded by: John McClannahan Crockett

Secretary of State of Texas
- In office December 22, 1853 – December 21, 1857
- Governor: Elisha M. Pease
- Preceded by: Thomas H. Duval
- Succeeded by: T.S. Anderson

Member of the Texas Senate from the 3rd district
- In office 1847–1848
- Preceded by: William Thomas Scott
- Succeeded by: Hart Hardin

Personal details
- Born: April 1, 1815 New Orleans, Louisiana, U.S.
- Died: May 4, 1880 (aged 65) Marshall, Texas, U.S.
- Party: Democratic
- Spouse(s): Lucy Long; Martha Melissa Evans
- Children: 4

Military service
- Allegiance: United States; Confederate States of America
- Branch/service: United States Army; Confederate States Army
- Rank: Brigadier General
- Unit: 14th Texas Infantry Regiment
- Battles/wars: Mexican–American War; American Civil War

Edward Clark (April 1, 1815 – May 4, 1880) was an American politician and slaveowner who served as the eighth governor of Texas from March to November 1861. When Governor Sam Houston refused to serve the Confederate States of America following the state's secession from the United States in February, 1861, he was removed from office and Clark replaced Houston as governor. Clark's term coincided with the outbreak of the American Civil War.

== Early life ==
Edward Clark was born on April 1, 1815, in New Orleans, Louisiana. His father was named Elijah Clark Jr. His paternal uncle, John Clark, served as the governor of Georgia from 1819 to 1823. His paternal grandfather was Elijah Clarke.

Clark grew up in Georgia. After his father died in the 1830s, he moved to Montgomery, Alabama, with his mother and studied law.

== Political career ==
Clark moved to Texas in 1842 and set up a law practice. He served in the Texas Annexation Convention and two terms as a state representative in the Texas Legislature. During the Mexican–American War he served on the staff of Major General J. Pinckney Henderson and fought in the Battle of Monterrey. When the war ended, he served as secretary of state under Governor Elisha M. Pease and as lieutenant governor serving under Governor Sam Houston. In February 1861, Texas voted to secede from the United States, an action Governor Houston opposed. When Houston refused to take an oath of allegiance to the Confederacy, he was removed from office and Clark became governor on March 18, 1861.

== Civil war ==
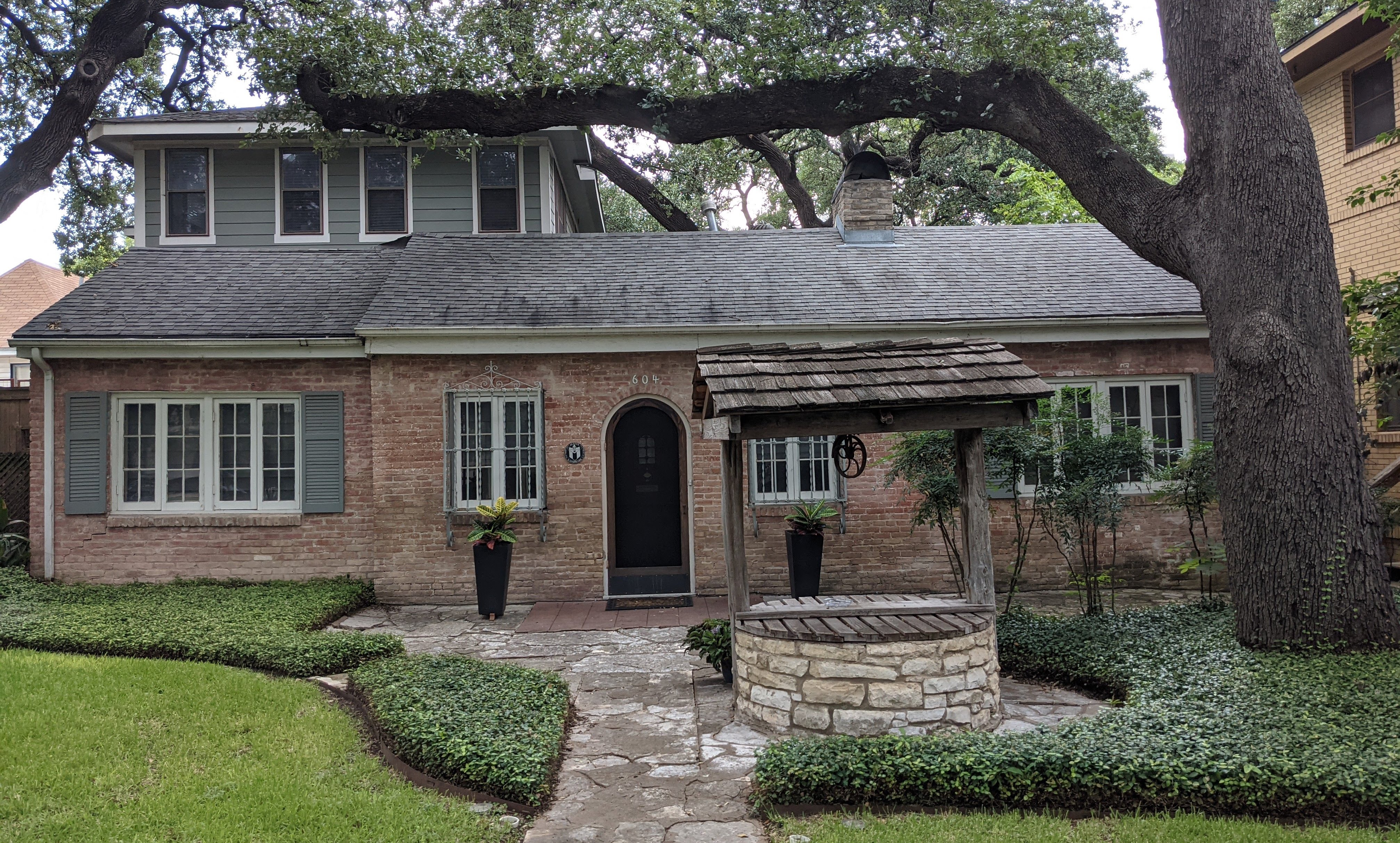
Slave quarters of Edward Clark's home in Austin. He enslaved nine people.

Texas faced similar challenges to the other seceding states as the nation headed towards civil war in 1861. Enlisting troops into the army, procuring weapons and supplies, and stabilizing the state's finances were Clark's main priorities, along with securing the frontier regions against opportunistic attacks by Native Americans, Mexico, or Union troops. Among his first actions was to order the surrender of all firearms and ammunition from private merchants to the state. Furthermore, all privately owned firearms were to be canvassed. Few weapons were ever turned in and most Texans did not comply for fear of future confiscation.

Concerned that Texas's position at the far western frontier of the Confederacy made it insecure and vulnerable, Governor Clark wrote to Confederate President Jefferson Davis in April demanding troops to secure the state, writing that “it is more than probable that an effort will soon be made by the submission party of this State, with General Houston at its head, to convert Texas into an independent republic.” However, manpower requests went both ways, as the Confederate war department also wrote to Clark demanding more Texas troops for the Confederate States Army.

The state militia system was reorganized under Clark's orders, with military training camps set up in different regions of the state. Facing a shortage of firearms, the soldiers were required to bring their own weapons. These militia troops were then enrolled in Confederate service after completing training.

As the prior governor's term he had been appointed to fill was expiring, Clark ran for reelection in the August 1861 election. In a narrow race, Francis Lubbock defeated Clark by 124 votes and Clark's term of office ended on November 7, 1861.

== Later career ==
After losing the governor's race, Clark enlisted in the army, becoming colonel of the 14th Texas Infantry Regiment. He commanded the unit, as part of the Greyhound Division, until he was wounded in the Battle of Pleasant Hill during the Red River Campaign. A promotion to brigadier general was not confirmed by the Confederate Congress and he left the service; however, in 1865 he was made a brigadier in the militia. He fled briefly to Mexico at the end of the American Civil War, and later returned home to Marshall, Texas.

== Personal life ==
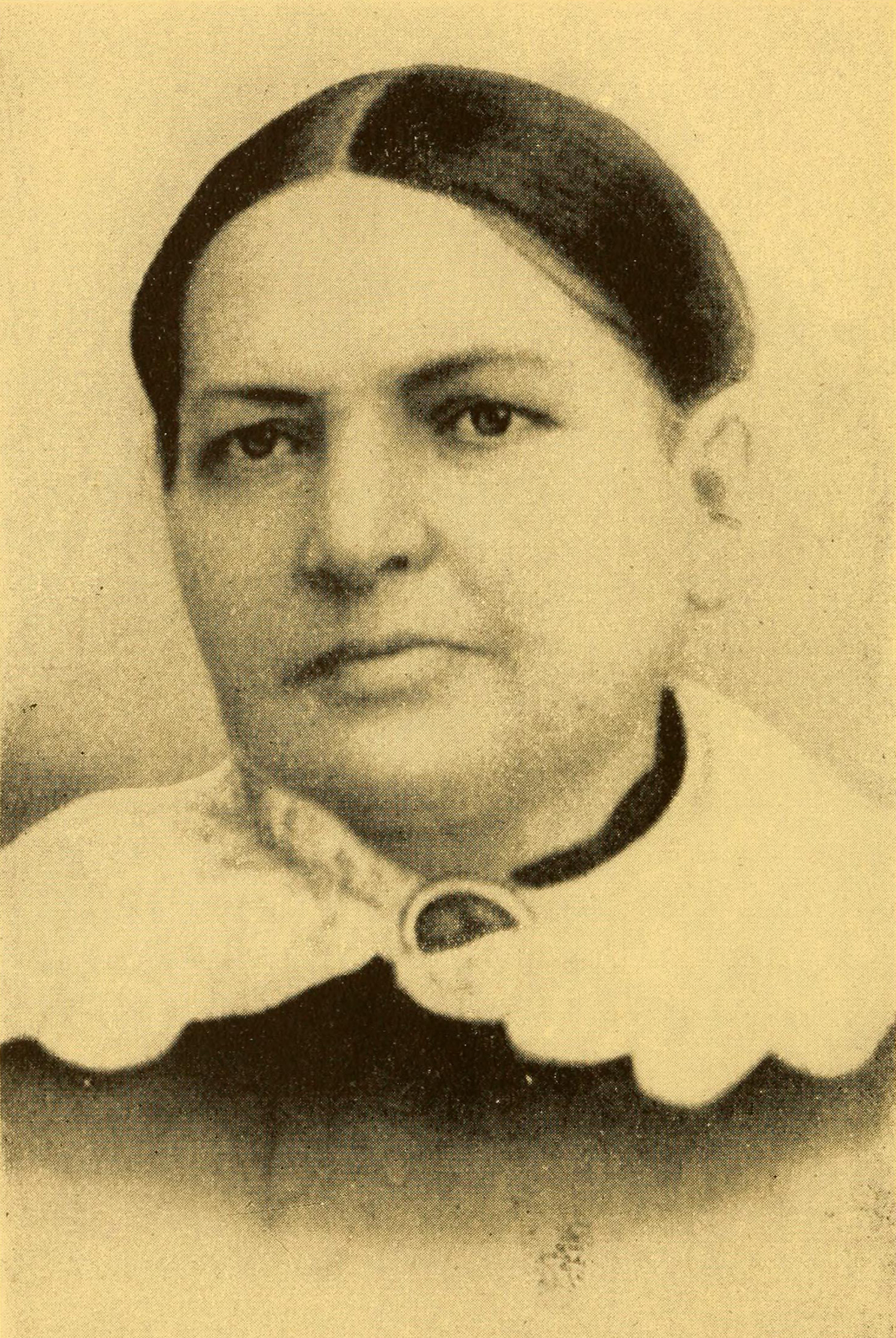
Martha Melissa Evans Clark

Clark married Lucy Long in 1840, but she died shortly after. He married Martha Melissa Evans in 1849. They had four children, including:

- William Evans Clark (Apr 1849 in Marshall, Harrison County, Texas – Jun 1852 in same);
- John Evans Clark (30 Jan 1852 in Marshall, Harrison County, Texas – 9 Oct 1923 in same), who married twice and had at least three children;
- William Evans Alfred Clark (12 Jul 1853 – 9 Apr 1879); and
- Nannie M Clark (c. 1855 – 8 Jan 1913 Harrison County, Texas), m. 23 Nov 1881 in Harrison County to Daniel C Wallis (alias Wallace).

== Death ==
Clark died on May 4, 1880, in Marshall, Texas. His grave in the Marshall City Cemetery is marked with a historical marker.

== See also ==
- List of American Civil War generals (Acting Confederate)

Texas Senate
Preceded by William Thomas Scott	Texas State Senator from District 3; 1847–1848	Succeeded by Hart Hardin
Political offices
Preceded by Thomas H. Duval	Secretary of State of Texas; 1853 – 1857	Succeeded by T.S. Anderson
Preceded by Francis R. Lubbock	Lieutenant Governor of Texas; 1859–1861	Succeeded by John McClannahan Crockett
Preceded by Sam Houston	Governor of Texas; 1861	Succeeded by Francis R. Lubbock
