= Larry Kilgore =

American politician (born 1965)

Personal details
- Born: Larry Scott Kilgore; 1965 (age 60–61) Amarillo, Texas, United States
- Party: Republican
- Occupation: Telecommunications contractor

Larry SECEDE Kilgore (born 1965) is a political activist in the Texas Secessionist Movement. He is a perennial Republican candidate who has run in multiple Texas statewide elections. He is one of the most prominent supporters of Texas secession (going so far as to change his legal middle name to "SECEDE" in late 2012). Kilgore received his most widespread attention during his advocacy for U.S. state secession petitions following the 2012 presidential election.

== Political aspirations ==
Kilgore has run unsuccessfully in several Republican primaries. He ran for governor in 2006 and came second in the Republican primary behind Governor Rick Perry with 50,119 votes (7.64%). He then ran for the U.S. Senate in 2008 and came second in the Republican primary behind Senator John Cornyn with 225,897 votes (18.51%). He ran again for governor in 2014 but was not a factor in the March 4 nomination of fellow Republican Greg Abbott, the outgoing state attorney general, who succeeded Perry as governor in January 2015. He ran for the Republican nomination for governor in the March 6, 2018 Republican Party Primary Election, against Abbott and Barbara Krueger. Kilgore came in last place with only 1% of the vote.

== Political positions ==
Kilgore believes that Texas could leave the U.S. without permission from the federal government, despite legal precedent of Texas v. White establishing the opposite. His motto has been "Secession! All other issues can be dealt with later"

Kilgore has advanced a number of other policies in his political bids, mainly based on what he considers biblical law. Running for the U.S. Senate in 2008, he advocated the death penalty for abortion, adultery and homosexuality and flogging for vulgar language and transvestitism. He also believes that Abraham Lincoln was the American equivalent of Adolf Hitler. He discussed this view and his support for secessionism in general when he appeared in a segment of The Daily Show on 21 February 2013.

== Personal life ==
Kilgore lives in Arlington, Texas, and works as a telecommunications contractor.
