= Francis Lubbock =

Governor of Texas from 1861 to 1863

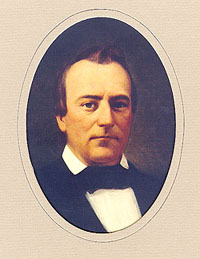

9th Governor of Texas
- In office November 7, 1861 – November 5, 1863
- Lieutenant: John McClannahan Crockett
- Preceded by: Edward Clark
- Succeeded by: Pendleton Murrah

6th Lieutenant Governor of Texas
- In office December 21, 1857 – December 21, 1859
- Governor: Hardin Richard Runnels
- Preceded by: Hardin Richard Runnels
- Succeeded by: Edward Clark

Personal details
- Born: October 16, 1815 Beaufort, South Carolina, U.S.
- Died: June 22, 1905 (aged 89) Austin, Texas, U.S.
- Party: Democratic
- Profession: Politician

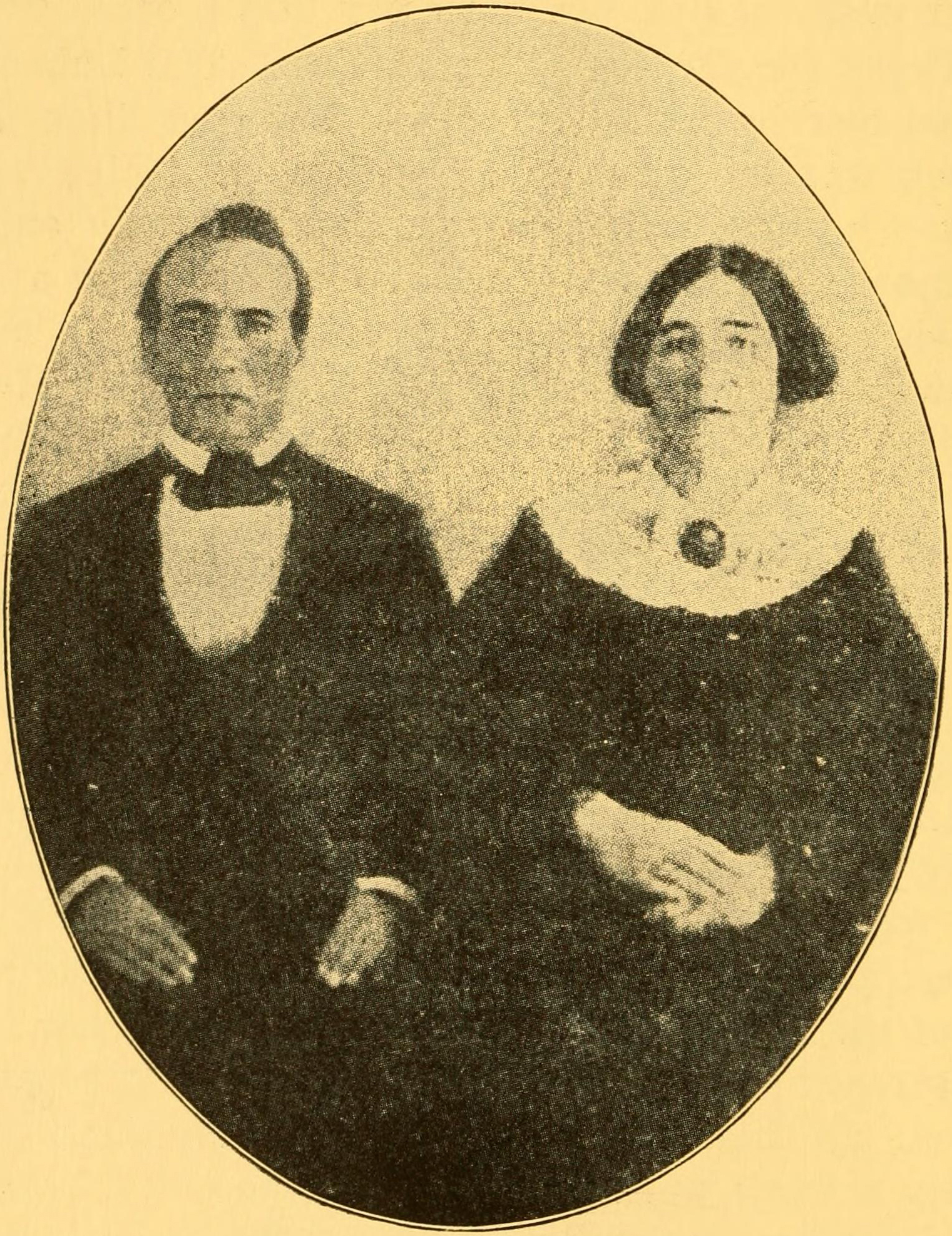
Francis and Adele Baron Lubbock (1819–1882)

Francis Richard Lubbock (October 16, 1815 – June 22, 1905) was a businessman, slaveholder, and politician from the American South who played a significant role in Texas history. A South Carolina native, he was a key player in Texas politics, serving as the 6th lieutenant governor of Texas and later the 9th governor of Texas during the Civil War. As governor, Lubbock was a fervent supporter of the Confederacy and instrumental in Texas' secession from the Union. After the war, he continued in public service as the Texas state treasurer. He was the brother of Thomas Saltus Lubbock, for whom both Lubbock County and the city of Lubbock are named.

== Early life ==
Francis Richard Lubbock, born in Beaufort, South Carolina, on October 16, 1815, was the son of Dr. Henry Thomas Willis and Susan Ann (Saltus) Lubbock. His paternal grandfather, Capt. Richard Lubbock, settled in Georgia and was a distinguished member of the masonic fraternity. His maternal grandfather, Capt. Francis Saltus, was a wealthy cotton planter and shipowner in Charleston. Lubbock's early education involved various schools and tutors, including an Irish schoolmaster, Patrick Brett, in Beaufort and Edgefield, South Carolina.

As a young boy, Lubbock had the opportunity to witness the visit of General Lafayette to the United States in 1824. His father, commanding the steamboat Henry Schultze, transported Lafayette from Charleston to Augusta. Lubbock's participation in the celebrations, including carrying candles in a procession and being presented to General Lafayette, left a lasting impression on him.

In 1828, the Lubbock family moved to Savannah, Georgia, where Francis's father managed the City Hotel. After his father's death the following year, the family returned to live in Charleston, where there was a large house that had been left to them.

== Career ==
=== South Carolina ===
A year before his father died, Lubbock had started working with him "after school hours assisting him in his accounts and other things that I could attend to intelligently. Here was the beginning of my business education." Now, at age 14, decided to forgo further schooling to support his family. He parlayed his experience into a clerkship in the hardware establishment of James H. Merritt, who turned out to be a very harsh employer. Nevertheless, Lubbock remained in this clerkship for three years.

At this time, he was involved in various social, military, and political organizations, including the Young Men's State's Rights Association. His participation in these activities, along with his work, played a significant role in shaping his political beliefs and personal development. During the Nullification Crisis in 1832-33, Lubbock was actively involved in the political scene in South Carolina. The crisis, which arose from South Carolina's opposition to federal tariffs, was a significant event in American history, laying the groundwork for the states' rights arguments that would later lead to the Civil War. Lubbock's experiences during this period further solidified his political stance as a State's Rights Democrat.

After his time in Charleston, Lubbock worked briefly with a cousin named F.C. Black at a West India commission house. He later moved to Hamburg, South Carolina, where he worked for Tully F. & H. W. Sullivan. His responsibilities included managing a cotton warehouse, and he also began buying cotton on behalf of a large buyer, earning commissions. This experience further developed his skills in commerce and trade.

=== New Orleans ===
In 1834, after hearing from a mutual acquaintance about the financial opportunities in New Orleans, Lubbock and his friend Charles T. Ketchum, both only 18 years old, relocated there and established the firm of Ketchum & Lubbock, a drugstore. Ketchum, an experienced "druggist", managed the prescription department, while Lubbock handled bookkeeping and sales. The business, initially successful, expanded into wholesale trade and made ventures into other commodities like castor oil, bacon, lard, sugar, and molasses. "This was a departure from our regular line of trade, and, as is usually the case, proved unremunerative." Eventually, the business faced financial difficulties due to poor collections and a market downturn in 1836, so the partners decided to liquidate the firm to pay off their creditors. Lubbock secured a job with Whittimore, Blair & Co., a firm dealing in watches, jewelry, silverware, and firearms, with a salary of two thousand dollars per year.

During this time, much was in the news about the events unfolding in Texas. Lubbock's brother, Tom Lubbock, who had recently also come to New Orleans, volunteered for the war in Texas. Though disappointed that his brother would leave a favorable situation in Louisiana, Lubbock "fitted him out, and bade him godspeed... Thus he left New Orleans with his company, known as the 'New Orleans Grays,' the first volunteer company to arrive in Texas from abroad." After months of hearing no news of Tom from Texas, Lubbock decided to go look for him.

=== Texas ===
After moving to Texas with his wife in late 1836, Lubbock engaged in various business activities, including selling goods in Velasco and assisting in the sale of a captured Mexican schooner's cargo. He faced challenges such as selling flour to the government at a low profit and adjusting to market fluctuations, which influenced his decision to relocate from the Brazos to Houston.

Encouraged by the Allen brothers—Augustus Chapman and John Kirby, who had founded the town of Houston only a few months before, Lubbock decided to settle there and set up his business, arriving in January 1837. He established himself as a merchant, dealing in various goods, including the first barrel of flour and sack of coffee sold in Houston. Lubbock invested in real estate, purchasing land and building a storehouse and a small house for his family.

By the summer of 1837, Lubbock found himself with little capital and decided to liquidate his business to pay off his creditors. The timing was providential, as Lubbock was chosen as assistant clerk of the House of Representatives when the Second Congress convened its session in Houston. He was soon after elected chief clerk.

Lubbock actively contributed to the development of Houston, including arranging for the importation of cisterns to improve the city's water supply. He sold his storehouse to the government for use as the executive mansion. These acts demonstrated his involvement in the city's infrastructure development.

In November 1837, President Sam Houston appointed Lubbock to be Comptroller, a position he accepted and executed diligently. He oversaw financial matters, including the examination and approval of government claims and the countersigning of stock certificates.

During this time, Lubbock participated in Texas's defensive strategies against Mexican forces. He played a key role in a war meeting at the Texas capitol in December 1837, serving as secretary. This meeting, responding to reports of a Mexican advance, aimed to organize defense and support those at the frontline. He was actively involved in forming resolutions and committees for vigilance and correspondence. When Indians were attacking frontier settlements in 1838, Lubbock requested a leave of absence from the President and joined Major George W. Bonnell's battalion as adjutant, embarking on a challenging campaign to protect Texas's frontier against Indian threats. Despite the difficulties, the battalion's efforts contributed to the security of the frontier, with Lubbock highlighting their role in preventing Indian attacks and protecting settlers.

Following the end of Sam Houston's term and the onset of Mirabeau Lamar's presidency, Lubbock, being aligned with the Houston party, faced political displacement. He was advised to resign from his position as Comptroller, which he did when his successor was appointed. After leaving his position as Comptroller of the Republic, Lubbock engaged in different ventures and remained active in the political scene. This is when Lubbock ventured into farming, which was marked by various challenges and experiences, including a failed attempt to transport his farm produce by boat, which ended in a loss of his crops in Galveston Bay.

In Houston, Lubbock partnered with James W. Scott to run a commission business, becoming the only auction and commission merchants in the city at the time. Their enterprise was diverse, dealing in a wide range of products such as French wines, hardware, groceries, footwear, lumber, sugar, salt, cigars, and coffee. They also engaged in real estate transactions, selling lots and blocks. Lubbock personally took on the role of auctioneer, handling the sale of various items, from small household goods to potentially larger assets like steamboats. Scott was responsible for the financial management, including bookkeeping and fiscal responsibilities. This venture demanded adaptability to meet the diverse needs of their clientele and reinforced Lubbock and Scott's engagement with the local community, blending their roles as businessmen with their public prominence, particularly in Lubbock's case due to his political activities. Despite the hard work and challenges, Lubbock looked for better opportunities while maintaining an active interest in public affairs.

Lubbock reentered politics as a candidate for the office of district dlerk in Harris County in 1840-41. He utilized a strategic approach, joining William K. Wilson on a tax assessing tour to meet voters, and campaigning vigorously. His efforts paid off, and he was elected as district clerk, a position he held for over 16 years, thanks to his popularity and effective campaigning.

Lubbock also actively participated in the political scene beyond his direct candidacies. He was involved in supporting presidential candidates, notably General Sam Houston, in 1841. Lubbock was appointed as the secretary in a large meeting of Houston's supporters, where he was part of a committee that drafted resolutions to promote Henry Smith as a candidate for vice-president to align with Houston's political aims. When Smith declined, they supported General Edward Burleson, who eventually won the vice-presidency.

During his tenure as the district clerk of Harris County, Lubbock was dedicated to serving with integrity and fairness. He established a principle of not engaging in speculation related to his office and made a conscious effort to treat the public generously. Lubbock was known for his love of horses, which he financed with his own money, without compromising his official duties.

His venture into ranching began in 1841, and it came about due to the scarcity of money and the abundance of livestock used as payment for legal fees. He acquired about 400 acres of land at 75 cents per acre on the south side of Simms' Bayou, near Houston. Despite initial reservations about the respectability of cattle ranching, Lubbock was determined to give the business respectability and began stocking his ranch with cattle and horses. By 1847, Lubbock moved permanently to his ranch, investing in the improvement of his property with good buildings, fencing, barns, and pastures. The ranch, located near Harrisburg, became a hub of activity and was frequented by neighbors and friends. Lubbock found the ranch life enjoyable, balancing his duties as a clerk and his responsibilities on the ranch.

Lubbock's ranching activities included round-ups, where cattle were gathered, branded, and sorted. The marketing of cattle during Lubbock's ranching years was challenging due to limited transportation options. Initially, cattle were driven overland to markets like Galveston and Houston, and later shipped to New Orleans via sailboats and steamers. Lubbock, along with his business partner S.W. Allen, was heavily involved in cattle shipping, adapting to the changing transportation methods over time.

Francis R. Lubbock's career in the Texas Republic was marked by significant political and administrative roles. He served as the comptroller of Texas, a position that underscored his involvement in the financial management of the Republic. However, Lubbock chose to resign from this post to retain his role as the clerk of the district court of Harris County, an office he preferred due to its proximity to his home and its higher financial rewards.

Lubbock was actively involved in the political landscape of the Texas Republic, particularly during Sam Houston's presidency. He was appointed as an aide to President Houston and served on his staff as a colonel of cavalry throughout Houston's term. This appointment placed Lubbock in a key position within Houston's administration, where he witnessed and contributed to various significant events and decisions.

As a political figure, Lubbock participated in events that celebrated and supported prominent leaders like President-elect Sam Houston. He played a crucial role in organizing a meeting in Houston where Houston was formally offered the freedom of the city. This involvement illustrates Lubbock's active participation in the Republic's political affairs and his support for its leadership.

Throughout his career, Lubbock was exposed to the challenges faced by the Texas Republic, including financial instability and external threats from Mexico. His tenure as Comptroller and his proximity to Houston's administration provided him with insights into the Republic's strategies to address these challenges, including fiscal austerity measures and responses to military threats from neighboring Mexico.

In 1857, Lubbock was elected lieutenant governor of Texas as a Democrat, but failed in his re-election bid in 1859. Following the Confederate secession in 1861, Lubbock won the governorship of Texas. During his tenure, he supported Confederate conscription, working to draft all able-bodied men, including resident aliens, into the Confederate States Army. He was known to praise the Great Hanging at Gainesville, where in October 1862, some 42 suspected Unionists were murdered, convicted and killed by hanging through sentences by a "citizens court" organized by Texas state troops, but not recognized under state law, with some 14 lynched without benefit even of a show trial. It was part of an outbreak of violence, often caused by Confederate or state troops, in North Texas in the early years of the war.

When Lubbock's term ended in 1863, he joined the Confederate Army. He was commissioned as a lieutenant colonel, serving under Major General John B. Magruder. By 1864, Lubbock was promoted to aide-de-camp for Jefferson Davis. Following the Confederacy's military collapse, Lubbock fled from Richmond, Virginia, with Davis. They were soon caught by Union troops in Georgia. He was imprisoned at Fort Delaware with John Reagan and Jefferson Davis for eight months before being paroled.

On his return to Texas, Lubbock continued to pursue business interests in Houston and Galveston. From 1878 to 1891, he served as Texas state treasurer.

== Death and legacy ==
Lubbock died in Austin on June 22, 1905, at the age of 89, making him the last confederate governor to die. He is buried at Texas State Cemetery in Austin.

Political offices
Preceded by Hardin Richard Runnels	Lieutenant Governor of Texas; 1857–1859	Succeeded by Edward Clark
Preceded by Edward Clark	Governor of Texas; 1861–1863	Succeeded by Pendleton Murrah
