= 2008 United States Senate election in Texas =

- November 4, 2008
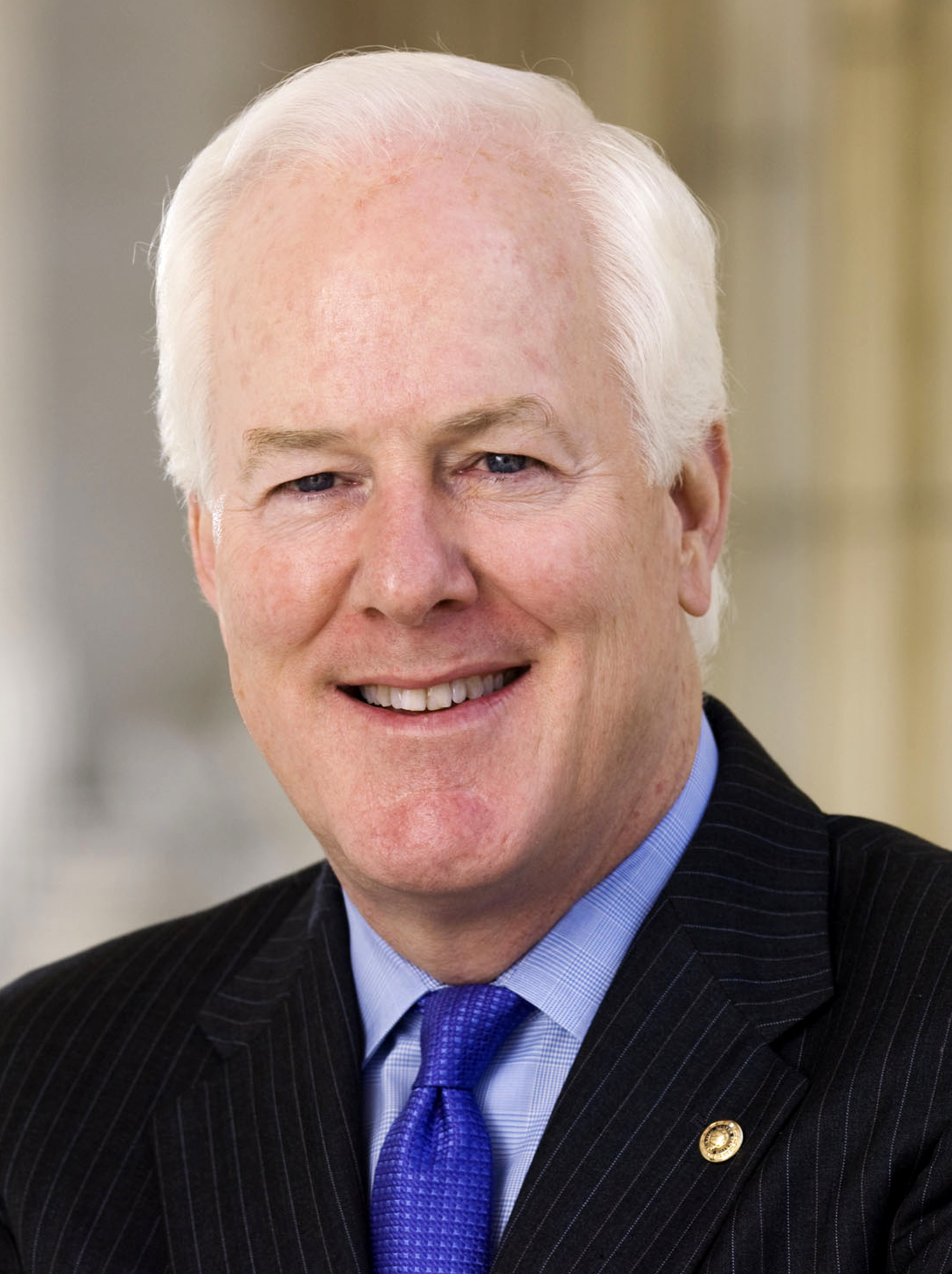

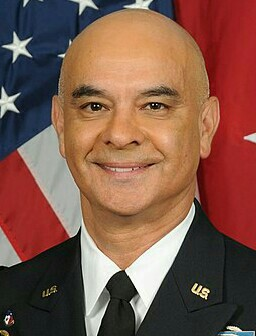
Nominee	John Cornyn	Rick Noriega
Party	Republican	Democratic
Popular vote	4,337,469	3,389,365
Percentage	54.82%	42.84%
- County results Cornyn: 50–60% 60–70% 70–80% 80–90% >90% Noriega: 40–50% 50–60% 60–70% 70–80% 80–90%
U.S. senator before election
John Cornyn
Republican
Elected U.S. Senator
John Cornyn
Republican

The 2008 United States Senate election in Texas was held on November 4, 2008. Incumbent Republican John Cornyn defeated Democratic nominee Rick Noriega, a member of the Texas House of Representatives, to win election to a second term. Cornyn increased his margin from 2002 in 2008 by 0.01%, a minuscule shift right.

== Republican primary ==
=== Candidates ===
- John Cornyn, incumbent U.S. senator
- Larry Kilgore, conservative/Secessionist activist

=== Results ===
Republican primary
Party	Candidate	Votes	%	±%
Republican	John Cornyn (incumbent)	997,216	81.48%	+4.17%
Republican	Larry Kilgore	226,649	18.52%	+0.00%
Total votes		1,223,865	100.00%	

== Democratic primary ==
Democratic primary results by county: Noreiga: 20–30%; 30–40%; 40–50%; 50–60%; 60–70%; 70–80%; 80–90%; Kelly: 20–30%; 30–40%; 40–50%; 50–60%; 60–70%; McCurrey: 30–40%; Tie: Tie

=== Candidates ===
- Gene Kelly, U.S. Air Force veteran and nominee for the U.S. Senate in 2000
- Ray McMurrey, teacher at Mary Carroll High School
- Rick Noriega, state representative
- Rhett Smith, U.S. Navy veteran and auditor at the Texas Department of Human Services

=== Results ===
Democratic primary
Party	Candidate	Votes	%
Democratic	Rick Noriega	1,110,579	51.01%
Democratic	Gene Kelly	584,966	26.87%
Democratic	Ray McMurrey	269,402	12.37%
Democratic	Rhett Smith	213,305	9.75%
Total votes		2,178,252	100.00%

== General election ==
=== Candidates ===
- John Cornyn (R), incumbent U.S. senator
- Rick Noriega (D), state representative
- Yvonne Adams Schick (L), real estate entrepreneur

=== Campaign ===
Cornyn, running as an incumbent, had a 42% approval rating with a 43% disapproval rating in June 2007. Texas is a red state that Republican presidential nominee John McCain won with over 55% of the vote. Cornyn slightly underperformed McCain. However, Noriega underperformed both 2008 Democratic presidential candidate Barack Obama in Texas and Cornyn's 2002 opponent, Ron Kirk, with Noriega receiving just 42.8% of the vote.

=== Predictions ===
Source	Ranking	As of
The Cook Political Report	Safe R	October 23, 2008
CQ Politics	Likely R	October 31, 2008
Rothenberg Political Report	Safe R	November 2, 2008
Real Clear Politics	Safe R	November 4, 2008

=== Polling ===
Poll source	Dates administered	Rick Noriega (D)	John Cornyn (R)
Rasmussen	September 18, 2007	30%	53%
Research 2000	September 24–26, 2007	35%	51%
Rasmussen Reports	May 1, 2008	43%	47%
Research 2000/Daily Kos	May 5–7, 2008	44%	48%
Baselice & Associates	May 20–25, 2008	33%	49%
Rasmussen Reports	June 2, 2008	35%	52%
Rasmussen Reports	June 25, 2008	35%	48%
Rasmussen Reports	July 30, 2008	39%	50%
Rasmussen Reports	September 29, 2008	43%	50%
Rasmussen Reports	October 21, 2008	40%	55%

=== Results ===
2008 Texas U.S. Senate general election
Party	Candidate	Votes	%	±%
Republican	John Cornyn (incumbent)	4,337,469	54.82%	−0.48%
Democratic	Rick Noriega	3,389,365	42.84%	−0.50%
Libertarian	Yvonne Adams Schick	185,241	2.34%	+1.55%
Majority		948,104	11.98%	
Turnout		7,912,075	58.28%	
Republican hold		Swing		

==== Counties that flipped from Republican to Democratic ====
- Bexar (largest municipality: San Antonio)
- Harris (largest municipality: Houston)
- Brewster (largest city: Alpine)
- Uvalde (largest city: Uvalde)

==== Counties that flipped from Democratic to Republican ====
- Bee (largest city: Beeville)
- Caldwell (largest city: Lockhart)
- Fisher (largest city: Rotan)
- Foard (largest city: Crowell)
- Haskell (largest city: Haskell)
- Marion (largest city: Jefferson)
- Pecos (largest city: Fort Stockton)
- Refugio (largest city: Refugio)
- San Augustine (largest city: San Augustine)
- San Patricio (largest city: Portland)
- Terrell (largest city: Sanderson)
- Morris (largest city: Daingerfield)
- Newton (largest city: Newton)
- Calhoun (largest city: Port Lavaca)
- Robertson (largest city: Hearne)

== See also ==
- 2008 United States Senate elections
