= Will Ford Hartnett =

American politician

Member of the Texas House of Representatives from the 114th district
- In office January 12, 1993 – January 8, 2013
- Preceded by: Tony Goolsby
- Succeeded by: Jason Villalba

Member of the Texas House of Representatives from the 102nd district
- In office January 8, 1991 – January 12, 1993
- Preceded by: Patricia Hill
- Succeeded by: Tony Goolsby

Personal details
- Born: June 3, 1956 (age 70) Austin, Texas, U.S.
- Party: Republican
- Spouse: Tammy Cotton Hartnett
- Children: 3
- Education: Harvard University (BA); University of Texas School of Law (JD)
- Occupation: Attorney

Will Ford Hartnett (born June 3, 1956) is an attorney in Dallas, Texas, who was from 1993 to 2013 a Republican member of the Texas House of Representatives from District 114 in Dallas County. In an earlier term from 1991 to 1993, he represented District 102, also in Dallas County, but he was switched to District 114 through redistricting after the 1990 U.S. census.

== Background ==
Hartnett was born in 1956 in Austin, Texas, where his father, James J. Hartnett Sr., was attending the University of Texas School of Law. The family settled in Dallas, where Hartnett in 1974 graduated as the valedictorian of the Cistercian Preparatory School in Irving in Dallas County. In 1978, he obtained his Bachelor of Arts degree cum laude from Harvard University in Cambridge, Massachusetts. In 1981, he earned his Juris Doctor degree from the UT Law School. Admitted that same year to the state bar of Texas, Hartnett entered into the practice of law with his father, a native of Nebraska who came to Texas for law school in the early 1950s. In 1986, Hartnett gained certification in Probate Law and Estate Planning. Since 1988, he has been a partner in the family-owned Hartnett Law Firm in Dallas.

He is a member of the Texas State and Dallas bar associations. In 1986 he co-authored "Annual Survey of Wills and Trusts," published in Southwestern Law Journal. Texas Monthly magazine in October 2012, just weeks before Hartnett left the legislature, voted him a "Super-Lawyer". He is listed in the 2013 editions of The Best Lawyers in America and Who's Who in American Law. He is admitted to practice before the United States Supreme Court and in other federal courts as well.

== Political life ==
In 1990, Hartnett was elected to the legislature in a politically mixed year in Texas, when the Democrat Ann W. Richards defeated Republican Clayton W. Williams Jr., for governor though early in the race Williams had garnered a large lead in public opinion polls. Three other Republicans were elected statewide that year, future Governor Rick Perry as Texas Commissioner of Agriculture, future U.S. Senator Kay Bailey Hutchison as state treasurer, and U.S. Senator Phil Gramm won reelection to the second of his three terms in that office by defeating the Democrat Hugh Parmer of Fort Worth. During Hartnett's tenure, he was either the chairman or vice-chairman of the House Judiciary Committee for fourteen years. In 1998, he joined the Texas Conservative Coalition, a group of conservative lawmakers in both houses of the state legislature. In 2001, Phyllis Schlafly's Eagle Forum rated Hartnett 93 percent, among the higher evaluations of Texas lawmakers. By 2012, Eagle Forum rated Hartnett only 33 percent conservative. The same kind of decline, from 93 percent conservative in 2001 to 33 percent in 2012, also happened to Hartnett's colleague from Denton County, Burt Solomons.

Representative Hartnett voted in 2006 to establish the Property Tax Relief Fund, a measure designed to reduce school district property taxes for maintenance and operation. He supported legislation to establish a minimum value for registration and tax purposes when an individual sells his own used vehicle to another. He supported legislation to allow an individual to use deadly force in self-defense. In 2007, he supported a pay increase for public school employees which excluded retirees. Hartnett voted to require photo identification for voting or the presentation of two non-photo ID cards to verify a person's identity. He voted with the House majority to reduce the fee for a marriage license from $60 to $30. Hartnett voted against casino gambling on Indian reservations; the measure died in the House on a 66-66 vote.

In 2007, Hartnett supported legislation to permit religious expression in public schools. Signed into law by Governor Perry, the measure allows students to express their religious beliefs in classroom assignments, to organize prayer groups and other religious clubs, and permits speakers at school events such as graduation ceremonies to mention religious matters.

In 2011, Hartnett voted to tax sales via the Internet if the company has a physical presence in Texas. Though the measure passed the House, 125-20, it was vetoed by Governor Perry. Hartnett voted to reduce funding for state agencies. He voted against a bill to ban texting while driving, another measure which Perry vetoed. He voted against a law signed by Perry which permits corporal punishment in public schools but only with parental consent. Hartnett voted with a House majority to ban smoking in most public places; cities may also limit smoking by local measures. He voted for an amendment offered in 2011 by conservative Representative Wayne Christian, who was defeated for re-nomination in 2012, to require public colleges and universities to fund student centers that promote family and traditional values. The amendment was approved by the House.

Hartnett voted to restrict state funding to facilities which perform abortions, but he did not vote on the 2011 measure which requires women in Texas who procure abortions first to undergo an ultrasound to be informed of the progress in the development of the child. He voted for legislation, passed 102-40 in the House and signed by Governor Perry, which authorizes a county, when determining eligibility for a "sponsored alien" under the Indigent Health Care and Treatment Act, to include in the resources of the applicant any additional incomes of their spouse and sponsor.

Hartnett and his wife, the former Tammy Cotton, reside in Dallas. They have three sons.

Texas House of Representatives
Preceded by Tony Goolsby	Texas State Representative for District 114 (Dallas County); 1993–2013	Succeeded by Jason Villalba
Preceded by Patricia Hill	Texas State Representative for District 102 (Dallas County); 1991–1993	Succeeded by Tony Goolsby
