= 1996 United States presidential election in Texas =

- November 5, 1996
- Turnout: 53.24% (of registered voters) ▼40.97% (of voting age population)

Nominee	Bob Dole	Bill Clinton	Ross Perot
Party	Republican	Democratic	Independent
Alliance			Reform
Home state	Kansas	Arkansas	Texas
Running mate	Jack Kemp	Al Gore	James Campbell (Note: On the California, Indiana, Iowa, Kansas, Louisiana, Maine, Maryland, Missouri, Montana, Oregon, South Dakota, Tennessee, and Texas election ballots, James Campbell of California, Perot's former boss at IBM, was listed as a stand-in vice-presidential candidate until Perot decided on Pat Choate as his choice for Vice President.)
Electoral vote	32	0	0
Popular vote	2,736,167	2,459,683	378,537
Percentage	48.76%	43.83%	6.75%

Dole
40–50%
50–60%
60–70%
70–80%
Clinton
40–50%
50–60%
60–70%
70–80%
80–90%
President before election
Bill Clinton
Democratic
Elected President
Bill Clinton
Democratic

The 1996 United States presidential election in Texas took place on November 5, 1996. All fifty states, and the District of Columbia, took part in the 1996 United States presidential election. State voters chose 32 electors to the Electoral College, which selected the president and vice president.

Texas was won by Kansas Senator Bob Dole, who was running against incumbent President Bill Clinton of Arkansas. Clinton ran a second time with incumbent Vice President Al Gore as his running mate, and Dole ran with former New York Representative Jack Kemp. Texas provided both two of the nation's three most Republican counties – High Plains-based Ochiltree in its north and Glasscock in the central plains – and its most Democratic county in rock-ribbed Tejano Starr County at the opposite end of the state.

Texas weighed in for this election 13% more Republican than the national average. With its 32 electoral votes, Texas was Dole's biggest electoral college prize. The presidential election of 1996 was a very multi-partisan election for Texas, with more than 7% of the electorate voting for third-party candidates. In his second bid for the presidency, Ross Perot led the newly reformed Reform Party to gain over 6% of the votes in his home state of Texas, and to pull in support nationally as the most popular third-party candidate to run for United States presidency in recent times. Loving County, Texas was one of two counties nationwide in which Ross Perot came in second place, ahead of one of the two major-party nominees, in 1996, the other being Arthur County, Nebraska.

The political realignment of the rural United States in the 21st century, aided by Texas Governor George W. Bush being the Republican nominee in the 2000 and 2004 presidential elections, resulted in the state's rural areas--including in traditional Democratic strongholds like East Texas--growing dramatically more Republican after this election. Primarily due to Clinton's rural appeal, this would be the last election in which rural Texas played a factor in the close margin, as almost all of these counties switched from Democratic to Republican beginning in 2000.

== Primary elections ==
=== Democratic primary ===
Bill Clinton easily won the Democratic Primary in Texas.

=== Republican primary ===
Republican primary county results Dole: 20–30% 30–40% 40–50% 50–60% 60–70% 70–80% >90% Buchanan: 30–40% 40–50% 50–60% Phil Gramm: 50–60% Tie: 30–40% 40–50% 50–60%

The Texas Republican presidential primary held on March 12, 1996, in the U.S. state of Texas, as part of the Republican Party's statewide nomination process for the 1996 U.S. presidential election.

Senator Bob Dole won the contest by 55.62% of the vote.

1996 Texas Republican presidential primary
Candidate	Votes	%
Bob Dole	567,164	55.62%
Pat Buchanan	217,974	21.37%
Steve Forbes	130,938	12.84%
Alan Keyes	41,746	4.09%
Steve Forbes	19,507	1.91%
Uncommitted	18,745	1.83%
Phil Gramm	18,629	1.83%
Richard Lugar	2,266	0.22%
Susan Ducey	1,093	0.11%
Mary LeTulle	650	0.06%
Charles E. Collins	633	0.06%
Morry Taylor	458	0.04%
Total	1,019,803	100.00%

== Results ==
1996 United States presidential election in Texas
Party	Candidate	Votes	Percentage	Electoral votes
Republican	Bob Dole	2,736,167	48.76%	32
Democratic	Bill Clinton (incumbent)	2,459,683	43.83%	0
Independent	Ross Perot	378,537	6.75%	0
Libertarian	Harry Browne	20,256	0.36%	0
Taxpayers’	Howard Phillips	7,472	0.13%	0
Green	Ralph Nader (write-in)	4,810	0.09%	0
Natural Law	John Hagelin	4,422	0.08%	0
Other write-ins		297	0.01%	0
Totals		5,611,644	100.00%	32
Voter turnout (voting age/registered)				41.3%/58.8%

=== Results by county ===
County	Bob Dole Republican		Bill Clinton Democratic		Ross Perot Independent		Various candidates Other parties		Margin		Total votes cast
County	#	%	#	%	#	%	#	%	#	%	Total votes cast
Anderson	6,458	48.19%	5,693	42.49%	1,170	8.73%	79	0.59%	765	5.70%	13,400
Andrews	2,360	58.99%	1,181	29.52%	431	10.77%	29	0.72%	1,179	29.47%	4,001
Angelina	11,789	46.38%	11,346	44.63%	2,160	8.50%	126	0.50%	443	1.75%	25,421
Aransas	3,769	50.66%	2,964	39.84%	655	8.80%	52	0.70%	805	10.82%	7,440
Archer	1,974	54.01%	1,235	33.79%	437	11.96%	9	0.25%	739	20.22%	3,655
Armstrong	582	62.18%	272	29.06%	75	8.01%	7	0.75%	310	33.12%	936
Atascosa	4,102	44.33%	4,259	46.02%	813	8.79%	80	0.86%	-157	-1.69%	9,254
Austin	4,669	58.36%	2,719	33.98%	577	7.21%	36	0.45%	1,950	24.38%	8,001
Bailey	1,246	60.31%	706	34.17%	109	5.28%	5	0.24%	540	26.14%	2,066
Bandera	3,700	65.22%	1,383	24.38%	520	9.17%	70	1.23%	2,317	40.84%	5,673
Bastrop	6,323	43.35%	6,773	46.44%	1,342	9.20%	147	1.01%	-450	-3.09%	14,585
Baylor	860	41.23%	955	45.78%	262	12.56%	9	0.43%	-95	-4.55%	2,086
Bee	3,611	41.19%	4,561	52.03%	539	6.15%	55	0.63%	-950	-10.84%	8,766
Bell	30,348	53.20%	22,638	39.68%	3,666	6.43%	397	0.70%	7,710	13.52%	57,049
Bexar	161,619	44.59%	180,308	49.74%	17,822	4.92%	2,740	0.76%	-18,689	-5.15%	362,489
Blanco	1,919	57.87%	1,028	31.00%	330	9.95%	39	1.18%	891	26.87%	3,316
Borden	194	58.08%	93	27.84%	45	13.47%	2	0.60%	101	30.24%	334
Bosque	2,840	47.13%	2,427	40.28%	739	12.26%	20	0.33%	413	6.85%	6,026
Bowie	12,750	43.56%	13,657	46.66%	2,760	9.43%	103	0.35%	-907	-3.10%	29,270
Brazoria	36,392	55.44%	22,959	34.98%	5,869	8.94%	418	0.64%	13,433	20.46%	65,638
Brazos	22,082	57.14%	13,968	36.15%	2,215	5.73%	379	0.98%	8,114	20.99%	38,644
Brewster	1,438	41.66%	1,643	47.60%	299	8.66%	72	2.09%	-205	-5.94%	3,452
Briscoe	416	46.64%	408	45.74%	65	7.29%	3	0.34%	8	0.90%	892
Brooks	413	11.84%	2,945	84.43%	108	3.10%	22	0.63%	-2,532	-72.59%	3,488
Brown	6,524	55.35%	4,138	35.11%	1,081	9.17%	44	0.37%	2,386	20.24%	11,787
Burleson	2,174	43.89%	2,419	48.84%	347	7.01%	13	0.26%	-245	-4.95%	4,953
Burnet	5,744	51.99%	4,123	37.32%	1,108	10.03%	74	0.67%	1,621	14.67%	11,049
Caldwell	3,239	41.41%	3,961	50.65%	545	6.97%	76	0.97%	-722	-9.24%	7,821
Calhoun	2,832	46.33%	2,753	45.04%	507	8.29%	21	0.34%	79	1.29%	6,113
Callahan	2,480	52.82%	1,666	35.48%	534	11.37%	15	0.32%	814	17.34%	4,695
Cameron	18,434	32.63%	34,891	61.76%	2,760	4.89%	408	0.72%	-16,457	-29.13%	56,493
Camp	1,488	40.63%	1,912	52.21%	252	6.88%	10	0.27%	-424	-11.58%	3,662
Carson	1,742	63.81%	742	27.18%	227	8.32%	19	0.70%	1,000	36.63%	2,730
Cass	4,066	37.51%	5,691	52.50%	1,038	9.58%	44	0.41%	-1,625	-14.99%	10,839
Castro	1,231	49.22%	1,107	44.26%	144	5.76%	19	0.76%	124	4.96%	2,501
Chambers	4,101	52.37%	2,876	36.73%	818	10.45%	36	0.46%	1,225	15.64%	7,831
Cherokee	6,483	51.07%	5,185	40.85%	971	7.65%	55	0.43%	1,298	10.22%	12,694
Childress	1,072	54.64%	719	36.65%	165	8.41%	6	0.31%	353	17.99%	1,962
Clay	1,997	48.00%	1,690	40.63%	465	11.18%	8	0.19%	307	7.37%	4,160
Cochran	667	49.93%	541	40.49%	127	9.51%	1	0.07%	126	9.44%	1,336
Coke	790	51.10%	595	38.49%	157	10.16%	4	0.26%	195	12.61%	1,546
Coleman	1,793	49.19%	1,488	40.82%	349	9.57%	15	0.41%	305	8.37%	3,645
Collin	83,750	63.01%	37,854	28.48%	10,443	7.86%	878	0.66%	45,896	34.53%	132,925
Collingsworth	729	50.94%	581	40.60%	118	8.25%	3	0.21%	148	10.34%	1,431
Colorado	3,381	49.90%	2,795	41.25%	574	8.47%	25	0.37%	586	8.65%	6,775
Comal	16,763	64.33%	7,132	27.37%	1,903	7.30%	259	0.99%	9,631	36.96%	26,057
Comanche	2,123	44.42%	2,138	44.74%	511	10.69%	7	0.15%	-15	-0.32%	4,779
Concho	488	47.29%	434	42.05%	107	10.37%	3	0.29%	54	5.24%	1,032
Cooke	7,320	59.53%	3,782	30.76%	1,150	9.35%	45	0.37%	3,538	28.77%	12,297
Coryell	7,143	51.23%	5,300	38.01%	1,443	10.35%	58	0.42%	1,843	13.22%	13,944
Cottle	331	40.46%	404	49.39%	77	9.41%	6	0.73%	-73	-8.93%	818
Crane	984	54.21%	616	33.94%	201	11.07%	14	0.77%	368	20.27%	1,815
Crockett	714	45.98%	684	44.04%	147	9.47%	8	0.52%	30	1.94%	1,553
Crosby	968	42.33%	1,122	49.06%	189	8.26%	8	0.35%	-154	-6.73%	2,287
Culberson	329	26.51%	804	64.79%	99	7.98%	9	0.73%	-475	-38.28%	1,241
Dallam	970	59.36%	483	29.56%	170	10.40%	11	0.67%	487	29.80%	1,634
Dallas	260,058	46.78%	255,766	46.00%	36,759	6.61%	3,370	0.61%	4,292	0.78%	555,953
Dawson	2,319	55.53%	1,612	38.60%	232	5.56%	13	0.31%	707	16.93%	4,176
Deaf Smith	3,051	60.44%	1,655	32.79%	310	6.14%	32	0.63%	1,396	27.65%	5,048
Delta	744	42.69%	849	48.71%	146	8.38%	4	0.23%	-105	-6.02%	1,743
Denton	65,313	58.53%	36,138	32.38%	9,294	8.33%	851	0.76%	29,175	26.15%	111,596
Dewitt	3,577	58.03%	2,074	33.65%	483	7.84%	30	0.49%	1,503	24.38%	6,164
Dickens	421	39.98%	509	48.34%	117	11.11%	6	0.57%	-88	-8.36%	1,053
Dimmit	604	20.19%	2,242	74.96%	128	4.28%	17	0.57%	-1,638	-54.77%	2,991
Donley	988	62.33%	495	31.23%	97	6.12%	5	0.32%	493	31.10%	1,585
Duval	543	11.65%	3,958	84.94%	136	2.92%	23	0.49%	-3,415	-73.29%	4,660
Eastland	3,272	49.61%	2,594	39.33%	705	10.69%	25	0.38%	678	10.28%	6,596
Ector	17,746	54.29%	12,017	36.76%	2,511	7.68%	412	1.26%	5,729	17.53%	32,686
Edwards	511	50.44%	437	43.14%	60	5.92%	5	0.49%	74	7.30%	1,013
Ellis	16,046	53.91%	10,832	36.39%	2,750	9.24%	138	0.46%	5,214	17.52%	29,766
El Paso	43,255	32.11%	83,964	62.33%	6,300	4.68%	1,191	0.88%	-40,709	-30.22%	134,710
Erath	4,750	49.49%	3,664	38.17%	1,134	11.81%	50	0.52%	1,086	11.32%	9,598
Falls	2,260	37.59%	3,256	54.16%	479	7.97%	17	0.28%	-996	-16.57%	6,012
Fannin	3,495	39.73%	4,276	48.61%	980	11.14%	45	0.51%	-781	-8.88%	8,796
Fayette	4,195	52.00%	3,119	38.66%	708	8.78%	46	0.57%	1,076	13.34%	8,068
Fisher	537	29.04%	1,142	61.76%	170	9.19%	0	0.00%	-605	-32.72%	1,849
Floyd	1,530	57.78%	986	37.24%	126	4.76%	6	0.23%	544	20.54%	2,648
Foard	166	28.97%	355	61.95%	52	9.08%	0	0.00%	-189	-32.98%	573
Fort Bend	49,945	53.79%	38,163	41.10%	4,363	4.70%	385	0.41%	11,782	12.69%	92,856
Franklin	1,575	45.63%	1,484	42.99%	386	11.18%	7	0.20%	91	2.64%	3,452
Freestone	2,888	47.37%	2,630	43.14%	568	9.32%	11	0.18%	258	4.23%	6,097
Frio	1,225	29.94%	2,593	63.37%	253	6.18%	21	0.51%	-1,368	-33.43%	4,092
Gaines	1,812	56.73%	1,012	31.68%	353	11.05%	17	0.53%	800	25.05%	3,194
Galveston	35,251	44.01%	38,458	48.02%	5,897	7.36%	483	0.60%	-3,207	-4.01%	80,089
Garza	946	53.93%	703	40.08%	103	5.87%	2	0.11%	243	13.85%	1,754
Gillespie	5,867	71.98%	1,655	20.30%	542	6.65%	87	1.07%	4,212	51.68%	8,151
Glasscock	382	78.93%	70	14.46%	30	6.20%	2	0.41%	312	64.47%	484
Goliad	1,335	50.66%	1,135	43.07%	148	5.62%	17	0.65%	200	7.59%	2,635
Gonzales	2,687	51.85%	2,110	40.72%	354	6.83%	31	0.60%	577	11.13%	5,182
Gray	6,102	69.15%	2,114	23.96%	568	6.44%	40	0.45%	3,988	45.19%	8,824
Grayson	17,169	48.48%	14,338	40.49%	3,745	10.58%	159	0.45%	2,831	7.99%	35,411
Gregg	21,611	57.66%	13,659	36.45%	2,079	5.55%	129	0.34%	7,952	21.21%	37,478
Grimes	2,564	44.97%	2,584	45.33%	538	9.44%	15	0.26%	-20	-0.36%	5,701
Guadalupe	14,254	58.41%	8,079	33.11%	1,811	7.42%	259	1.06%	6,175	25.30%	24,403
Hale	5,905	60.59%	3,204	32.88%	605	6.21%	32	0.33%	2,701	27.71%	9,746
Hall	626	42.53%	750	50.95%	94	6.39%	2	0.14%	-124	-8.42%	1,472
Hamilton	1,493	49.26%	1,200	39.59%	323	10.66%	15	0.49%	293	9.67%	3,031
Hansford	1,493	76.80%	343	17.64%	105	5.40%	3	0.15%	1,150	59.16%	1,944
Hardeman	610	39.84%	750	48.99%	168	10.97%	3	0.20%	-140	-9.15%	1,531
Hardin	8,529	47.65%	7,179	40.11%	2,112	11.80%	80	0.45%	1,350	7.54%	17,900
Harris	421,462	49.24%	386,726	45.18%	42,364	4.95%	5,341	0.62%	34,736	4.06%	855,893
Harrison	9,835	45.42%	10,307	47.60%	1,427	6.59%	86	0.40%	-472	-2.18%	21,655
Hartley	1,242	68.66%	463	25.59%	101	5.58%	3	0.17%	779	43.07%	1,809
Haskell	966	37.56%	1,374	53.42%	225	8.75%	7	0.27%	-408	-15.86%	2,572
Hays	12,865	47.93%	11,580	43.14%	1,990	7.41%	405	1.51%	1,285	4.79%	26,840
Hemphill	986	68.57%	344	23.92%	104	7.23%	4	0.28%	642	44.65%	1,438
Henderson	10,345	45.43%	10,085	44.29%	2,274	9.99%	68	0.30%	260	1.14%	22,772
Hidalgo	24,437	28.84%	56,335	66.49%	3,536	4.17%	419	0.49%	-31,898	-37.65%	84,727
Hill	4,401	46.46%	3,988	42.10%	1,052	11.11%	32	0.34%	413	4.36%	9,473
Hockley	4,230	60.86%	2,170	31.22%	519	7.47%	31	0.45%	2,060	29.64%	6,950
Hood	7,575	52.06%	5,459	37.52%	1,445	9.93%	71	0.49%	2,116	14.54%	14,550
Hopkins	4,341	43.72%	4,522	45.54%	1,034	10.41%	32	0.32%	-181	-1.82%	9,929
Houston	3,443	46.28%	3,383	45.48%	585	7.86%	28	0.38%	60	0.80%	7,439
Howard	5,007	50.80%	3,732	37.86%	1,037	10.52%	81	0.82%	1,275	12.94%	9,857
Hudspeth	367	40.87%	427	47.55%	92	10.24%	12	1.34%	-60	-6.68%	898
Hunt	10,746	49.12%	8,801	40.23%	2,225	10.17%	104	0.48%	1,945	8.89%	21,876
Hutchinson	6,350	64.78%	2,553	26.04%	864	8.81%	36	0.37%	3,797	38.74%	9,803
Irion	386	55.94%	213	30.87%	86	12.46%	5	0.72%	173	25.07%	690
Jack	1,162	46.72%	1,019	40.97%	301	12.10%	5	0.20%	143	5.75%	2,487
Jackson	2,533	54.59%	1,785	38.47%	309	6.66%	13	0.28%	748	16.12%	4,640
Jasper	4,523	42.51%	5,039	47.36%	1,041	9.78%	37	0.35%	-516	-4.85%	10,640
Jeff Davis	482	50.05%	370	38.42%	99	10.28%	12	1.25%	112	11.63%	963
Jefferson	32,821	38.88%	45,854	54.31%	5,314	6.29%	437	0.52%	-13,033	-15.43%	84,426
Jim Hogg	307	16.94%	1,437	79.30%	64	3.53%	4	0.22%	-1,130	-62.36%	1,812
Jim Wells	2,989	28.27%	7,116	67.31%	430	4.07%	37	0.35%	-4,127	-39.04%	10,572
Johnson	16,246	50.03%	12,817	39.47%	3,250	10.01%	160	0.49%	3,429	10.56%	32,473
Jones	2,351	43.46%	2,422	44.77%	614	11.35%	23	0.43%	-71	-1.31%	5,410
Karnes	1,869	43.12%	2,154	49.70%	291	6.71%	20	0.46%	-285	-6.58%	4,334
Kaufman	8,697	48.34%	7,383	41.03%	1,831	10.18%	82	0.46%	1,314	7.31%	17,993
Kendall	5,940	67.65%	2,092	23.82%	620	7.06%	129	1.47%	3,848	43.83%	8,781
Kenedy	71	34.13%	133	63.94%	4	1.92%	0	0.00%	-62	-29.81%	208
Kent	187	36.31%	260	50.49%	67	13.01%	1	0.19%	-73	-14.18%	515
Kerr	11,173	66.61%	4,192	24.99%	1,236	7.37%	174	1.04%	6,981	41.62%	16,775
Kimble	898	57.45%	521	33.33%	131	8.38%	13	0.83%	377	24.12%	1,563
King	97	53.30%	46	25.27%	29	15.93%	10	5.49%	51	28.03%	182
Kinney	650	51.75%	503	40.05%	97	7.72%	6	0.48%	147	11.70%	1,256
Kleberg	3,391	37.68%	5,136	57.07%	431	4.79%	41	0.46%	-1,745	-19.39%	8,999
Knox	599	38.97%	785	51.07%	149	9.69%	4	0.26%	-186	-12.10%	1,537
Lamar	6,393	46.59%	6,075	44.27%	1,198	8.73%	56	0.41%	318	2.32%	13,722
Lamb	2,593	56.69%	1,683	36.79%	283	6.19%	15	0.33%	910	19.90%	4,574
Lampasas	3,008	56.10%	1,819	33.92%	509	9.49%	26	0.48%	1,189	22.18%	5,362
La Salle	570	26.10%	1,522	69.69%	85	3.89%	7	0.32%	-952	-43.59%	2,184
Lavaca	3,697	53.93%	2,575	37.56%	551	8.04%	32	0.47%	1,122	16.37%	6,855
Lee	2,354	49.00%	2,008	41.80%	421	8.76%	21	0.44%	346	7.20%	4,804
Leon	2,839	51.01%	2,217	39.83%	499	8.97%	11	0.20%	622	11.18%	5,566
Liberty	7,784	46.41%	6,877	41.00%	2,011	11.99%	101	0.60%	907	5.41%	16,773
Limestone	2,691	40.49%	3,236	48.69%	693	10.43%	26	0.39%	-545	-8.20%	6,646
Lipscomb	869	64.66%	357	26.56%	115	8.56%	3	0.22%	512	38.10%	1,344
Live Oak	1,929	53.41%	1,372	37.98%	292	8.08%	19	0.53%	557	15.43%	3,612
Llano	4,290	55.45%	2,633	34.03%	762	9.85%	52	0.67%	1,657	21.42%	7,737
Loving	48	62.34%	14	18.18%	15	19.48%	0	0.00%	33 (Note: In this county where Perot ran second ahead of Clinton, margin given is Dole vote minus Perot vote.)	42.86%	77
Lubbock	47,304	63.50%	22,786	30.59%	3,996	5.36%	403	0.54%	24,518	32.91%	74,489
Lynn	1,151	52.39%	903	41.10%	136	6.19%	7	0.32%	248	11.29%	2,197
Madison	1,576	47.03%	1,470	43.87%	293	8.74%	12	0.36%	106	3.16%	3,351
Marion	1,260	34.45%	2,028	55.46%	353	9.65%	16	0.44%	-768	-21.01%	3,657
Martin	973	54.88%	643	36.27%	140	7.90%	17	0.96%	330	18.61%	1,773
Mason	949	54.70%	618	35.62%	151	8.70%	17	0.98%	331	19.08%	1,735
Matagorda	5,876	47.03%	5,374	43.01%	1,190	9.52%	54	0.43%	502	4.02%	12,494
Maverick	1,050	15.94%	5,307	80.58%	202	3.07%	27	0.41%	-4,257	-64.64%	6,586
McCulloch	1,465	48.70%	1,231	40.92%	296	9.84%	16	0.53%	234	7.78%	3,008
McLennan	30,666	48.61%	27,050	42.88%	5,131	8.13%	236	0.37%	3,616	5.73%	63,083
McMullen	274	63.72%	117	27.21%	35	8.14%	4	0.93%	157	36.51%	430
Medina	5,710	55.03%	3,880	37.39%	715	6.89%	72	0.69%	1,830	17.64%	10,377
Menard	443	42.47%	490	46.98%	102	9.78%	8	0.77%	-47	-4.51%	1,043
Midland	25,382	68.01%	9,513	25.49%	2,079	5.57%	346	0.93%	15,869	42.52%	37,320
Milam	3,019	39.90%	3,869	51.13%	657	8.68%	22	0.29%	-850	-11.23%	7,567
Mills	1,044	51.35%	748	36.79%	230	11.31%	11	0.54%	296	14.56%	2,033
Mitchell	949	39.46%	1,213	50.44%	232	9.65%	11	0.46%	-264	-10.98%	2,405
Montague	3,029	45.71%	2,718	41.02%	842	12.71%	37	0.56%	311	4.69%	6,626
Montgomery	51,011	65.23%	20,722	26.50%	6,065	7.76%	404	0.52%	30,289	38.73%	78,202
Moore	3,353	65.96%	1,358	26.72%	359	7.06%	13	0.26%	1,995	39.24%	5,083
Morris	1,449	30.01%	2,973	61.58%	402	8.33%	4	0.08%	-1,524	-31.57%	4,828
Motley	380	62.81%	164	27.11%	56	9.26%	5	0.83%	216	35.70%	605
Nacogdoches	10,361	53.25%	7,641	39.27%	1,352	6.95%	104	0.53%	2,720	13.98%	19,458
Navarro	5,236	41.88%	6,078	48.62%	1,140	9.12%	48	0.38%	-842	-6.74%	12,502
Newton	1,409	31.62%	2,554	57.32%	474	10.64%	19	0.43%	-1,145	-25.70%	4,456
Nolan	2,166	40.18%	2,582	47.89%	613	11.37%	30	0.56%	-416	-7.71%	5,391
Nueces	37,470	40.22%	50,009	53.68%	5,103	5.48%	586	0.63%	-12,539	-13.46%	93,168
Ochiltree	2,448	79.20%	467	15.11%	167	5.40%	9	0.29%	1,981	64.09%	3,091
Oldham	583	66.17%	213	24.18%	77	8.74%	8	0.91%	370	41.99%	881
Orange	12,560	42.85%	13,741	46.88%	2,836	9.68%	174	0.59%	-1,181	-4.03%	29,311
Palo Pinto	3,666	42.36%	3,938	45.50%	1,011	11.68%	40	0.46%	-272	-3.14%	8,655
Panola	4,008	44.59%	4,168	46.37%	777	8.64%	35	0.39%	-160	-1.78%	8,988
Parker	14,580	54.29%	9,447	35.18%	2,703	10.07%	125	0.47%	5,133	19.11%	26,855
Parmer	2,042	70.71%	676	23.41%	160	5.54%	10	0.35%	1,366	47.30%	2,888
Pecos	1,730	43.89%	1,816	46.07%	369	9.36%	27	0.68%	-86	-2.18%	3,942
Polk	6,473	45.44%	6,360	44.65%	1,347	9.46%	64	0.45%	113	0.79%	14,244
Potter	14,995	57.13%	9,273	35.33%	1,799	6.85%	178	0.68%	5,722	21.80%	26,245
Presidio	383	22.32%	1,205	70.22%	111	6.47%	17	0.99%	-822	-47.90%	1,716
Rains	1,123	41.09%	1,265	46.29%	335	12.26%	10	0.37%	-142	-5.20%	2,733
Randall	28,266	71.33%	9,177	23.16%	1,985	5.01%	199	0.50%	19,089	48.17%	39,627
Reagan	645	55.22%	407	34.85%	101	8.65%	15	1.28%	238	20.37%	1,168
Real	845	58.40%	414	28.61%	178	12.30%	10	0.69%	431	29.79%	1,447
Red River	1,783	39.06%	2,339	51.24%	433	9.49%	10	0.22%	-556	-12.18%	4,565
Reeves	1,007	28.40%	2,279	64.27%	245	6.91%	15	0.42%	-1,272	-35.87%	3,546
Refugio	1,376	42.35%	1,635	50.32%	222	6.83%	16	0.49%	-259	-7.97%	3,249
Roberts	421	72.09%	122	20.89%	40	6.85%	1	0.17%	299	51.20%	584
Robertson	1,944	37.57%	2,912	56.27%	315	6.09%	4	0.08%	-968	-18.70%	5,175
Rockwall	8,319	65.01%	3,289	25.70%	1,121	8.76%	67	0.52%	5,030	39.31%	12,796
Runnels	1,941	51.58%	1,417	37.66%	396	10.52%	9	0.24%	524	13.92%	3,763
Rusk	8,423	54.22%	5,988	38.55%	1,072	6.90%	51	0.33%	2,435	15.67%	15,534
Sabine	1,660	42.29%	1,913	48.74%	334	8.51%	18	0.46%	-253	-6.45%	3,925
San Augustine	1,296	36.39%	1,924	54.03%	324	9.10%	17	0.48%	-628	-17.64%	3,561
San Jacinto	2,878	44.38%	2,771	42.73%	810	12.49%	26	0.40%	107	1.65%	6,485
San Patricio	7,678	45.21%	8,132	47.88%	1,085	6.39%	88	0.52%	-454	-2.67%	16,983
San Saba	991	51.72%	726	37.89%	194	10.13%	5	0.26%	265	13.83%	1,916
Schleicher	587	48.67%	505	41.87%	111	9.20%	3	0.25%	82	6.80%	1,206
Scurry	2,929	49.95%	2,099	35.79%	813	13.86%	23	0.39%	830	14.16%	5,864
Shackelford	792	53.84%	502	34.13%	169	11.49%	8	0.54%	290	19.71%	1,471
Shelby	3,482	43.27%	3,720	46.22%	815	10.13%	31	0.39%	-238	-2.95%	8,048
Sherman	809	70.78%	243	21.26%	89	7.79%	2	0.17%	566	49.52%	1,143
Smith	32,171	59.97%	18,265	34.05%	2,933	5.47%	274	0.51%	13,906	25.92%	53,643
Somervell	1,099	46.23%	993	41.78%	273	11.49%	12	0.50%	106	4.45%	2,377
Starr	756	10.41%	6,312	86.94%	157	2.16%	35	0.48%	-5,556	-76.53%	7,260
Stephens	1,714	52.27%	1,218	37.15%	336	10.25%	11	0.34%	496	15.12%	3,279
Sterling	394	58.89%	186	27.80%	86	12.86%	3	0.45%	208	31.09%	669
Stonewall	323	35.22%	487	53.11%	105	11.45%	2	0.22%	-164	-17.89%	917
Sutton	688	52.84%	508	39.02%	102	7.83%	4	0.31%	180	13.82%	1,302
Swisher	1,159	44.71%	1,224	47.22%	195	7.52%	14	0.54%	-65	-2.51%	2,592
Tarrant	208,312	50.85%	170,431	41.60%	28,715	7.01%	2,186	0.53%	37,881	9.25%	409,644
Taylor	23,682	59.17%	13,213	33.02%	2,912	7.28%	214	0.53%	10,469	26.15%	40,021
Terrell	185	35.65%	278	53.56%	47	9.06%	9	1.73%	-93	-17.91%	519
Terry	2,013	56.43%	1,272	35.66%	269	7.54%	13	0.36%	741	20.77%	3,567
Throckmorton	360	48.85%	285	38.67%	90	12.21%	2	0.27%	75	10.18%	737
Titus	3,438	43.37%	3,725	46.99%	744	9.38%	21	0.26%	-287	-3.62%	7,928
Tom Green	18,112	55.21%	11,782	35.91%	2,757	8.40%	157	0.48%	6,330	19.30%	32,808
Travis	98,454	39.97%	128,970	52.36%	14,008	5.69%	4,869	1.98%	-30,516	-12.39%	246,301
Trinity	2,058	38.76%	2,774	52.24%	460	8.66%	18	0.34%	-716	-13.48%	5,310
Tyler	2,804	41.11%	3,340	48.97%	645	9.46%	32	0.47%	-536	-7.86%	6,821
Upshur	5,174	45.71%	5,032	44.45%	1,086	9.59%	28	0.25%	142	1.26%	11,320
Upton	685	56.89%	424	35.22%	88	7.31%	7	0.58%	261	21.67%	1,204
Uvalde	3,494	47.65%	3,397	46.32%	403	5.50%	39	0.53%	97	1.33%	7,333
Val Verde	4,357	41.10%	5,623	53.05%	548	5.17%	72	0.68%	-1,266	-11.95%	10,600
Van Zandt	7,453	49.60%	5,752	38.28%	1,756	11.69%	65	0.43%	1,701	11.32%	15,026
Victoria	14,457	59.94%	8,238	34.16%	1,197	4.96%	227	0.94%	6,219	25.78%	24,119
Walker	7,177	49.27%	6,088	41.79%	1,186	8.14%	116	0.80%	1,089	7.48%	14,567
Waller	3,559	41.28%	4,535	52.60%	499	5.79%	29	0.34%	-976	-11.32%	8,622
Ward	1,620	43.41%	1,644	44.05%	446	11.95%	22	0.59%	-24	-0.64%	3,732
Washington	6,319	60.65%	3,460	33.21%	601	5.77%	39	0.37%	2,859	27.44%	10,419
Webb	4,712	19.02%	18,997	76.67%	936	3.78%	132	0.53%	-14,285	-57.65%	24,777
Wharton	6,163	50.38%	5,176	42.31%	871	7.12%	24	0.20%	987	8.07%	12,234
Wheeler	1,355	59.20%	750	32.77%	174	7.60%	10	0.44%	605	26.43%	2,289
Wichita	20,495	51.30%	15,775	39.49%	3,371	8.44%	309	0.77%	4,720	11.81%	39,950
Wilbarger	2,037	47.73%	1,730	40.53%	465	10.90%	36	0.84%	307	7.20%	4,268
Willacy	1,332	24.62%	3,789	70.02%	241	4.45%	49	0.91%	-2,457	-45.40%	5,411
Williamson	36,836	55.37%	24,175	36.34%	4,931	7.41%	580	0.87%	12,661	19.03%	66,522
Wilson	4,530	49.96%	3,713	40.95%	760	8.38%	64	0.71%	817	9.01%	9,067
Winkler	1,009	47.98%	872	41.46%	218	10.37%	4	0.19%	137	6.52%	2,103
Wise	6,330	48.81%	5,056	38.99%	1,516	11.69%	66	0.51%	1,274	9.82%	12,968
Wood	6,228	51.21%	4,711	38.74%	1,184	9.74%	38	0.31%	1,517	12.47%	12,161
Yoakum	1,485	60.51%	738	30.07%	218	8.88%	13	0.53%	747	30.44%	2,454
Young	3,647	54.46%	2,394	35.75%	639	9.54%	17	0.25%	1,253	18.71%	6,697
Zapata	521	21.27%	1,786	72.90%	131	5.35%	12	0.49%	-1,265	-51.63%	2,450
Zavala	463	14.50%	2,629	82.34%	91	2.85%	10	0.31%	-2,166	-67.84%	3,193
Totals	2,736,167	48.76%	2,459,683	43.83%	378,537	6.75%	37,257	0.66%	276,484	4.93%	5,611,644

==== Counties that flipped from Democratic to Republican ====
- Angelina
- Briscoe
- Clay
- Coleman
- Concho
- Crockett
- Franklin
- Freestone
- Hardin
- Hays
- Henderson
- Hill
- Houston
- Jack
- Lamar
- Liberty
- Madison
- McCulloch
- Mills
- Montague
- Polk
- San Jacinto
- Throckmorton
- Upshur

==== Counties that flipped from Independent to Republican ====
- Grayson
- Irion
- Loving
- Somervell

==== Counties that flipped from Republican to Democratic ====
- Atascosa
- Karnes
- Pecos
- Ward

==== By congressional district ====
Despite losing the state, Clinton won 16 of 30 congressional districts, including three which elected Republicans, while Dole won the other 14, including four which elected Democrats.

District	Dole	Clinton	Perot	Representative
1st	46%	45%	9%	Jim Chapman
1st	46%	45%	9%	Max Sandlin
2nd	45.1%	45.3%	9.6%	Charlie Wilson
2nd	45.1%	45.3%	9.6%	Jim Turner
3rd	60%	32%	8%	Sam Johnson
4th	56%	35%	9%	Ralph Hall
5th	45.7%	46.4%	7.9%	John Bryant
5th	45.7%	46.4%	7.9%	Pete Sessions
6th	60%	33%	7%	Joe Barton
7th	67%	28%	5%	Bill Archer
8th	67%	27%	6%	Jack Fields
8th	67%	27%	6%	Kevin Brady
9th	45%	48%	7%	Steve Stockman
9th	45%	48%	7%	Nick Lampson
10th	40%	54%	6%	Lloyd Doggett
11th	50%	42%	8%	Chet Edwards
12th	45.5%	46.3%	8.1%	Pete Geren
12th	45.5%	46.3%	8.1%	Kay Granger
13th	53%	39%	8%	Mac Thornberry
14th	50%	42%	8%	Greg Laughlin
14th	50%	42%	8%	Ron Paul
15th	34.6%	60.5%	4.9%	Kika de la Garza
15th	34.6%	60.5%	4.9%	Rubén Hinojosa
16th	32%	63%	5%	Ronald D. Coleman
16th	32%	63%	5%	Silvestre Reyes
17th	51%	39%	10%	Charles Stenholm
18th	23.5%	73.1%	3.5%	Sheila Jackson Lee
19th	68%	26%	6%	Larry Combest
20th	35%	60%	5%	Henry B. González
21st	63%	30%	7%	Lamar Smith
22nd	56.5%	37.7%	5.8%	Tom DeLay
23rd	44%	50%	6%	Henry Bonilla
24th	39%	54%	7%	Martin Frost
25th	44%	51%	5%	Ken Bentsen
26th	63%	30%	7%	Dick Armey
27th	38%	57%	5%	Solomon Ortiz
28th	31.8%	62.6%	5.5%	Frank Tejeda
29th	33%	61%	6%	Gene Green
30th	25%	70%	5%	Eddie Bernice Johnson

== Analysis ==
As of the 2024 presidential election, this is the last time a Democratic presidential candidate won the following counties: Hudspeth, Pecos, Terrell, Ward, Swisher, Hall, Cottle, Hardeman, Foard, Baylor, Knox, Haskell, Stonewall, Kent, Dickens, Crosby, Jones, Fisher, Nolan, Mitchell, Menard, Comanche, Palo Pinto, Bastrop, Caldwell, Nueces, San Patricio, Refugio, Bee, Karnes, Atascosa, Burleson, Milam, Falls, Limestone, Navarro, Waller, Grimes, Galveston, Trinity, Orange, Jasper, Tyler, Sabine, San Augustine, Shelby, Panola, Harrison, Marion, Cass, Bowie, Camp, Titus, Red River, Rains, Hopkins, Delta, and Fannin. The 58 counties who have not voted for a Democrat since 1996 are the most from one state in this election -- an election already defined by being the end of white rural Southern support for the Democrats writ large -- and the most from one state since 1976 (also Texas, with 73).

This would also be the last election until 2016 in which the margin of victory for a Republican in Texas would be in the single digits, the most recent one when the Republican candidate's vote percentage was held to only a plurality, and the most recent where the margin of victory was less than 5 points. This is also the last time a Democrat won a county in the Texas Panhandle. Clinton became the first ever Democrat to win the White House without carrying Angelina, Briscoe County, Texas, Clay, Concho, Franklin, Freestone, Hardin, Hays, Henderson, Hill, Houston, Liberty, McCulloch, Montague, Polk, Throckmorton, or Upshur Counties, as well as the first to do so without carrying Madison County since James Buchanan in 1856, the first to do so without carrying San Jacinto County since Grover Cleveland in 1892, and the first to do so without carrying Coleman, Crockett, Jack, or Mills Counties since John F. Kennedy in 1960. This was the first election that a Democrat was elected twice without ever carrying the state.

== See also ==
- United States presidential elections in Texas
- Presidency of Bill Clinton
