= 2002 United States Senate election in Texas =

- November 5, 2002

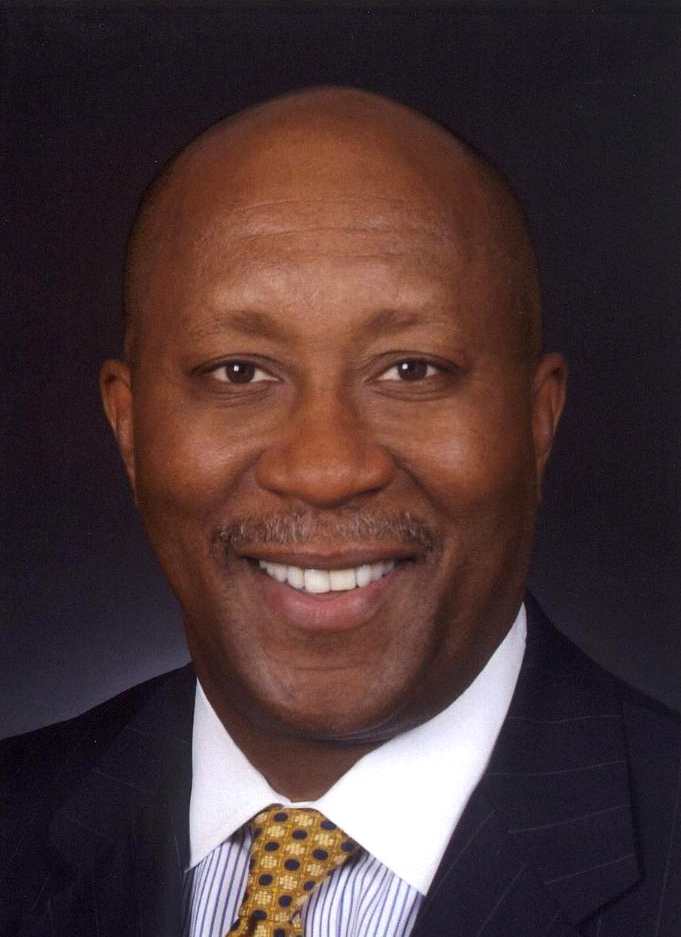
Nominee	John Cornyn	Ron Kirk
Party	Republican	Democratic
Popular vote	2,496,243	1,955,758
Percentage	55.30%	43.33%
- Cornyn: 40–50% 50–60% 60–70% 70–80% 80–90% Kirk: 40–50% 50–60% 60–70% 70–80% 80–90%
U.S. senator before election
Phil Gramm
Republican
Elected U.S. Senator
John Cornyn
Republican

The 2002 United States Senate election in Texas was held on November 5, 2002. Incumbent Republican U.S. Senator Phil Gramm decided to retire, instead of seeking a fourth term. State Attorney General Republican John Cornyn won the open seat. This was the first open-seat election since 1984.

== Republican primary ==
- John Cornyn, attorney general of Texas

=== Polling ===
Hypothetical polling

Henry Bonilla vs. John Cornyn vs. Tony Garza vs. David Dewhurst

Poll source	Date(s) administered	Sample size (Note: Key: A – all adults RV – registered voters LV – likely voters V – unclear)	Margin of error	Henry Bonilla	John Cornyn	Tony Garza	David Dewhurst	Undecided
Montgomery & Associates (D)	Before September 10, 2001	– (V)	–	14%	27%	7%	16%	36%

Henry Bonilla vs. David Dewhurst

Poll source	Date(s) administered	Sample size	Margin of error	Henry Bonilla	David Dewhurst	Undecided
Montgomery & Associates (D)	Before September 10, 2001	– (V)	–	24%	44%	32%

=== Results ===
Republican primary results
Party	Candidate	Votes	%
Republican	John Cornyn	478,825	77.3
Republican	Bruce Rusty Lang	46,907	7.6
Republican	Douglas Deffenbaugh	43,611	7.0
Republican	Dudley F. Mooney	32,202	5.2
Republican	Lawrence Cranberg	17,757	2.9
Total votes		619,302	100.0

== Democratic primary ==
=== Candidates ===
Nominee

- Ron Kirk, mayor of Dallas

Eliminated in runoff

- Victor Morales, teacher, Navy veteran, 1996 Senate nominee

Eliminated in primary

- Ken Bentsen Jr., U.S. representative, nephew of former US Senator Lloyd Bentsen
- Ed Cunningham, former football player for the Texas Longhorns (1985–87, 1989)
- Gene Kelly, perennial candidate and 2000 Democratic nominee for U.S. Senate

Democratic primary results by county Map legend: Kirk—60–70%; Kirk—50–60%; Kirk—40–50%; Kirk—30–40%; Kirk—20–30%; Morales—70–80%; Morales—60–70%; Morales—50–60%; Morales—40–50%; Morales—30–40%; Bentsen—70–80%; Bentsen—60–70%; Bentsen—50–60%; Bentsen—40–50%; Bentsen—30–40%; Morales-Bentsen tie—30–40%; Kirk-Bentsen tie—32.08%; No vote

Democratic primary results
Party	Candidate	Votes	%
Democratic	Victor M. Morales	317,048	33.2
Democratic	Ron Kirk	316,052	33.1
Democratic	Ken Bentsen	255,501	26.8
Democratic	Gene Kelly	44,038	4.6
Democratic	Ed Cunningham	22,016	2.3
Total votes		954,655	100.0

Source: OurCampaigns.com, TX US Senate - D Primary

=== Runoff ===
Democratic runoff results by county Map legend: Kirk—80–90%; Kirk—70–80%; Kirk—60–70%; Kirk—50–60%; Morales—80–90%; Morales—70–80%; Morales—60–70%; Morales—50–60%; tie—50%; No vote

Democratic runoff results
Party	Candidate	Votes	%
Democratic	Ron Kirk	370,878	59.8
Democratic	Victor M. Morales	249,423	40.2
Total votes		620,301	100.0

Source: OurCampaigns.com, TX US Senate - D Runoff

== General election ==
=== Campaign ===
Despite the fact that Texas is a red state, Kirk ran on a socially progressive platform: supporting abortion rights and opposing Bush judicial nominee Priscilla Richman, although Kirk was a former George W. Bush supporter. He also supported increases in defense spending, such as Bush's proposed $48 billion increase in military spending, except for the money Bush wanted to use for missile defense. Cornyn was endorsed by U.S. president and former Governor George W. Bush, while Kirk had the support of former San Antonio mayor Henry Cisneros, former Governor Ann Richards and former U.S. Senator Lloyd Bentsen.

Cornyn was criticized for taking campaign money from Enron and other controversial companies. And although other Democrats have seized on the issue, Kirk is well-entrenched in the Dallas business community, and his wife resigned from two private-sector jobs that created potential conflicts of interest for Kirk while he was mayor.

An October Dallas Morning News poll had Cornyn leading 47% to 37%. A record $18 million was spent in the election.

=== Debates ===
2002 United States Senate election in Texas debates
No.	Date	Host	Moderator	Link	Republican	Democratic
Key: P Participant A Absent N Not invited I Invited W Withdrawn						
Key: P Participant A Absent N Not invited I Invited W Withdrawn					John Cornyn	Ron Kirk
1	Oct. 18, 2002	Houston Chronicle; KHOU	Greg Hurst	C-SPAN	P	P
2	Oct. 23, 2002	Freedom of Information Foundation of Texas; Hispanic Broadcasting Corporation; KERA-TV; Texas Association of Broadcasters; Texas Monthly; The Dallas Morning News; TXCN; Univision; WFAA	John McCaa	C-SPAN	P	P

=== Predictions ===
Source	Ranking	As of
Sabato's Crystal Ball	Lean R	November 4, 2002

=== Polling ===
Poll source	Date(s) administered	Sample size	Margin of error	John Cornyn (R)	Ron Kirk (D)	Other	Undecided
Zogby International/MSNBC	November 3–4, 2002	– (V)	–	50%	46%	–	4%
Zogby International/MSNBC	October 30 – November 2, 2002	– (V)	± 4.5%	49%	48%	–	3%
Blum & Weprin Associates Inc. (Note: Poll conducted for The Dallas Morning News)	October 29 – November 1, 2002	1,002 (LV)	± 3.0%	50%	41%	9%	
University of Houston/ Rice University (Note: Poll conducted for The Houston Chronicle and KHOU-TV)	Late–October 2002	656 (LV)	± 3.6%	45%	39%	–	10%
SurveyUSA (Note: Poll conducted for KVUE-TV, KPRC-TV, and KSAT-TV)	October 29–31, 2002	683 (LV)	± 3.9%	53%	45%	2%	
Scripps-Howard	October 7–29, 2002	1,000 (A)	± 4.3%	44%	35%	–	21%
Frank N. Magid Associates, Inc. (Note: Poll sponsored by KXAS-TV)	October 21–27, 2002	550 (LV)	± 4.3%	43%	40%	–	15%
SurveyUSA	October 21–23, 2002	604 (LV)	± 4.1%	52%	45%	3%	
Frank N. Magid Associates, Inc.	October 15–20, 2002	600 (LV)	± 4.1%	46%	36%	–	16%
Frank N. Magid Associates, Inc.	October 8–13, 2002	600 (LV)	± 4.1%	46%	36%	–	16%
Zogby International/MSNBC	October 9–11, 2002	– (V)	–	45%	37%	–	18%
Frank N. Magid Associates, Inc.	September 30 – October 6, 2002	600 (LV)	± 4.1%	56%	30%	–	14%
FM3 Research (D) (Note: Poll sponsored by the Democratic Senatorial Campaign Committee)	September 22–24, 2002	– (V)	± 3.6	35%	39%	–	26%
Zogby International/MSNBC	September 17–18, 2002	–	–	42%	30%	–	28%
University of Houston/ Rice University	September 3–15, 2002	879 (LV)	± 4.1%	42%	36%	–	22%
Scripps-Howard	August 7–27, 2002	756 (LV)	± 3.5%	37%	32%	–	30%
Montgomery & Associates (D)	July 31 – August 7, 2002	–	–	46%	46%	–	8%
University of Houston/ Rice University	June 20–29, 2002	739 (LV)	± 3.5%	28%	36%	–	36%
Scripps-Howard	May 20 – June 9, 2002	668 (LV)	± 3.8%	35%	30%	–	33%
Montgomery & Associates (D)	May 7–13, 2002	1,066 (LV)	± 3.0%	46%	44%	–	10%

=== Results ===
General election results
Party	Candidate	Votes	%	±%
Republican	John Cornyn	2,496,243	55.30%	+0.52%
Democratic	Ron Kirk	1,955,758	43.33%	−0.61%
Libertarian	Scott Jameson	35,538	0.79%	−0.14%
Green	Roy Williams	25,051	0.55%	N/A
Write-in	James W. Wright	1,422	0.03%	N/A
Majority		540,485	11.97%	+1.13%
Turnout		4,514,012		

==== Counties that flipped from Democratic to Republican ====
- Atascosa (largest city: Pleasanton)
- Bastrop (largest city: Elgin)
- Brewster (largest city: Alpine)
- Cottle (largest city: Paducah)
- Fannin (largest city: Bonham)
- Galveston (largest city: Galveston)
- Knox (largest city: Munday)
- Milam (largest city: Rockdale)
- Palo Pinto (largest city: Mineral Wells)
- Red River (largest city: Clarksville)
- Stonewall (largest city: Aspermont)
- Trinity (largest city: Trinity)
- Waller (largest city: Hempstead)
- Robertson (largest city: Hearne)
- Bexar (largest city: San Antonio)
- Calhoun (largest city: Port Lavaca)

==== Counties that flipped from Republican to Democratic ====
- Pecos (largest city: Fort Stockton)
- San Augustine (largest city: San Augustine)
- San Patricio (largest city: Portland)
- Hudspeth (largest city: Fort Hancock)
- Refugio (largest city: Refugio)
- Dallas (largest city: Dallas)

== See also ==
- 2002 United States Senate election

== Notes ==
Partisan clients
