= Tony Goolsby =

American businessman and politician (1933–2020)

James Anthony "Tony" Goolsby

Member of the Texas House of Representatives from the 114th district
- In office January 10, 1989 – January 12, 1993
- Preceded by: Fred Agnich
- Succeeded by: Will Ford Hartnett

Member of the Texas House of Representatives from the 102nd district
- In office January 12, 1993 – January 13, 2009
- Preceded by: Will Ford Hartnett
- Succeeded by: Carol Kent

Personal details
- Born: November 9, 1933 Colbert, Oklahoma, U.S.
- Died: September 4, 2020 (aged 86) Dallas, Texas, U.S.
- Party: Republican
- Spouse: Mary Tanner "Toppy" Goolsby
- Children: 3
- Education: University of North Texas (BS)
- Occupation: Insurance executive, lobbyist, teacher

Military service
- Branch/service: United States Army

James Anthony Goolsby, known as Tony Goolsby (November 9, 1933 - September 4, 2020), was a businessman in Dallas, Texas, who, from 1993 to 2009, was a Republican member of the Texas House of Representatives from District 102 in northeastern Dallas County. In two earlier terms, from 1989 to 1993, he represented District 114, also in Dallas County.

== Background ==
Goolsby was born in Colbert in Bryan County in southern Oklahoma. He graduated from Longview High School in Longview in East Texas. He was an officer in the United States Army. In 1961, he received a Bachelor of Science degree from the University of North Texas in Denton, where he was a member of Theta Chi fraternity.

Early in his career, he was a teacher, coach, and principal in the Celeste Independent School District in Celeste in Hunt County northeast of Dallas. Thereafter, he was in the insurance business.

== Political life ==
Goolsby was initially elected in 1988 to succeed the retiring District 114 Republican Fred Agnich, a former vice chairman of the Republican National Committee and a former president of the Dallas-based Texas Instruments. Though unopposed for re-nomination in the 2008 Republican primary, Goolsby was unseated in the general election by the Democrat Carol Kent, 21,675 (53 percent) to 19,210 (47 percent). In his last successful election in 2006, he had defeated another Democratic woman, Harriet Miller, 13,166 (52.9 percent) to 11,613 (45.8 percent). Kent served one term and was herself unseated in 2010 by the African American Republican Stefani Carter.

In 2001, Phyllis Schlafly's Eagle Forum rated Goolsby 86 percent conservative, among the higher evaluations of Texas lawmakers.

Representative Goolsby voted in 2006 to establish the Property Tax Relief Fund, a measure designed to reduce school district property taxes for maintenance and operation. He also supported legislation to establish a minimum value for registration and tax purposes when an individual sells his own used vehicle to another. Goolsby supported legislation to allow an individual to use deadly force in self-defense. In 2007, he supported a pay increase for public school employees which excluded retirees. Goolsby voted to require photo identification for voting or the use of two non-photo ID cards to verify a person's identity. He voted with the House majority to reduce the fee for a marriage license from $60 to $30. Goolsby voted against casino gambling on Indian reservations; the measure died in the House on a 66-66 vote.

Goolsby supported legislation in 2007 to permit religious expression in public schools. Signed into law by Governor Rick Perry, the measure allows students to express their religious beliefs in classroom assignments, to organize prayer groups and other religious clubs, and permits speakers at school events such as graduation ceremonies to mention religious viewpoints.

In 2007, Goolsby and Kenn George, a former legislator and then the chairman of the Dallas County Republican Party, were sued for libel in the 192nd Texas District Court in Dallas by Goolsby's former Democratic legislative opponent, Harriet Miller. The suit contends that George and Goolsby filed a false voter complaint against Miller with the district attorney of Dallas County. Miller then claimed that the complaint was used in 2006 to attack her campaign and to suppress African-American voter turnout in District 102.

After he left the legislature after twenty years, Goolsby became a lobbyist at the Texas State Capitol in Austin. In 2011, Goolsby indicated that he planned to seek the District 8 seat in the Texas State Senate to succeed the retiring Republican Florence Shapiro of Plano, but he never sought the post. Instead Republican Ken Paxton of McKinney won the open election to succeed Shapiro.

Goolsby and his wife, the former Mary Tanner, known as Toppy Goolsby (born 1943), have three daughters, Mellie, Cherrie, and Brooke. The Goolsbys resided in Dallas, Texas. Goolsby was a United Methodist.

Texas House of Representatives
Preceded by Fred Agnich	Texas State Representative from District 114 (Dallas County); 1989–1993	Succeeded by Will Ford Hartnett
Preceded by Will Ford Hartnett	Texas State Representative from District 102 (Dallas County); 1993–2009	Succeeded by Carol Kent
