= Victor Morales (politician) =

American politician (born 1949)

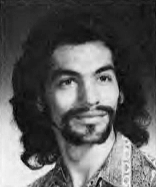
- Morales in 1975

Member of the Crandall City Council
- In office 1994–1996

Personal details
- Born: November 15, 1949 (age 76) Racine, Wisconsin, U.S.
- Party: Democratic
- Spouse: Dani
- Children: 3, including Julia and Jesse Morales
- Education: Texas A&I University (B.S.)

Military service
- Allegiance: United States
- Branch/service: United States Navy
- Years of service: 1970–1972
- Battles/wars: Vietnam War

Victor M. Morales (born November 15, 1949) is an American educator and former politician who was the Democratic Party's nominee for the 1996 United States Senate election in Texas in 1996. Morales was a 46-year-old Vietnam War veteran and civics teacher at Poteet High School in Mesquite, Texas when his students dared him to run for Senate and he did.

== Early life and education ==
Morales was born November 15, 1949, in Racine, Wisconsin. He was in the navy from 1970–1972, and served in the Philippines and Vietnam during the Vietnam War. He graduated from Texas A&I University in 1976. He was a city council member in Crandall, Texas. He danced competitively.

== Political career ==
Morales, who had never run for statewide office before, pulled a major upset in the primary by defeating three politicians: U.S. Congressman John Wiley Bryant, U.S. Congressman Jim Chapman, and former State Supreme Court litigator John Odam. He campaigned around the state in his pickup truck. His campaign slogan was "Porque no? or "Why Not?" His only previous political experience was a two-year term on the City Council of his hometown of Crandall, Texas. In the March run-off, he defeated Bryant with 51% of the vote. Many political observers thought he benefitted from having the same last name as Dan Morales, the Texas Attorney General, and that voters confused the two of them. He became the first minority candidate in Texas history to become a United States Senate nominee from either major party. Despite having no staff, raising only $15,000, and not accepting any special interest money he obtained over 2.4 million votes.

Exit polls showed that Morales won African Americans' votes (79% to 19%) and Latinos (79% to 20%) respectively. Though Morales lost, his effort was an important moment for the Hispanic community. "It's just rejuvenated the community, paving the way for future candidates ... there's a lot of excitement because of what he was able to do."

Morales would proceed to lose political campaigns in 1998 for the U.S. House of Representatives, in 2002 for the U.S. Senate, in 2006 for the U.S. House of Representatives, and finally in 2008 for the Texas House of Representatives.

== Personal life ==
Morales is of Mexican descent. His daughter, Julia Morales, is a sports anchor and reporter with the Houston Astros. His youngest son, Jesse Morales, is an actor, model and former professional dancer.

== See also ==
- 1996 United States Senate election in Texas
- Cristina Tzintzún Ramirez - Latina candidate for U.S. Senate in Texas in 2020

Party political offices
Preceded by Hugh Parmer	Democratic nominee for U.S. Senator from Texas (Class 2); 1996	Succeeded by Ron Kirk
