= John Odam =

American lawyer, author, and politician

- Born: John Will Odam; May 19, 1943; Abilene, Texas, U.S.
- Died: August 21, 2022; Wimberley, Texas, U.S.
- Education: University of Texas at Austin (BA); Baylor University (JD)
- Political party: Democratic
- Spouse: Peggy Kurtz (m. 1966; died 2022)
- Children: 2

John Will Odam (May 19, 1943 – August 21, 2022) was an American lawyer, author, and politician from the U.S. state of Texas. He served as general counsel for the Harris County Attorney's Office.

== Biography ==
Odam briefly served in the United States Army before graduating from the University of Texas and Baylor Law School. In 1973, he began working for the Texas Attorney General, where he eventually became Executive Assistant Attorney General before retiring and returning to practicing law privately. He later served as chairman of the Harris County Democratic Party and a special assistant to Houston mayor Kathy Whitmire, among other positions. He ran for Texas Attorney General in 1990, losing the Democratic primary to Dan Morales. In 1996, he ran for one of Texas's Senate seats, losing the nomination to Victor Morales. Along with Jim Chapman, Odam was one of two candidates for the 1996 Democratic nomination for Senate who was eliminated in the first round of voting. During his unsuccessful campaign for Senate, he emphasized his status as a political outsider who would be well-positioned to implement campaign finance reform; he also received media attention for visiting all 254 counties in Texas. In 2008, he served on the Obama/Biden Texas Finance Committee.
