= 1985 Texas's 1st congressional district special election =

- August 3, 1985
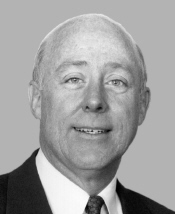

Nominee	Jim Champan	Ed Hargett
Party	Democratic	Republican
Popular vote	52,665	50,741
Percentage	50.9%	49.1%
U.S. Representative before election
Sam B. Hall
Democratic
Elected U.S. Representative
Jim Chapman
Democratic

The 1985 United States House of Representatives special election in Texas's 1st congressional district was held on June 29, 1985, to select the successor to Sam B. Hall (D) who was appointed as a U.S. District Judge by President Ronald Reagan. Since no candidate received an outright majority during the first round, a special runoff was held on August 3, 1985. Republicans saw this special election as a prime opportunity to demonstrate the political realignment of East Texas, as the district had supported Republicans Ronald Reagan and Phil Gramm in 1984. Gramm had arranged Hall's appointment to the judiciary in an attempt to see a Republican elected from the area.

Texas's 1st congressional district special primary
Party	Candidate	Votes	%
Republican	Edd Hargett	29,720	42.02%
Democratic	Jim Chapman	21,382	30.23%
Democratic	Sam W. Russell	13,090	18.51%
Democratic	Jim McWilliams	3,410	4.82%
Democratic	Billy W. Flanagan	2,270	3.21%
Democratic	Carl Brown	416	0.59%
Democratic	Warren G. Harding	305	0.43%
Independent	Freddie John Wieder	130	0.18%
Total votes		70,723	100%

== Runoff ==
During the runoff campaign, Assistant U.S. Attorney General William Bradford Reynolds sued the state of Texas, saying the election had to be approved by the U.S. Department of Justice under preclearance established by Section 5 of the Voting Rights Act of 1965. Governor Mark White complied with a judicial ruling and submitted the request, and the runoff was not postponed. Reynolds denied having any political motivations in his actions.

Despite the district's shift towards the Republicans, Democrat Jim Chapman narrowly won the runoff, keeping the seat in Democratic hands.

Texas's 1st congressional district special runoff
Party	Candidate	Votes	%
Democratic	Jim Chapman	52,665	50.93%
Republican	Edd Hargett	50,741	49.07%
Total votes		103,406	100%
Democratic hold			
