= Texans for Vaccine Choice =

Anti-vaccine activism group

Texans for Vaccine Choice (TFVC)
- Formation: 2015; 11 years ago
- Founders: Michelle Evans, Rebecca Hardy, and Jackie Schlegel
- Type: Political action committee
- Region served: Texas
- President: Rebecca Hardy
- Website: www.texansforvaccinechoice.com

Texans for Vaccine Choice (TFVC) is an anti-vaccine Facebook group turned political action committee in Texas which advocates for personal belief exemptions to vaccination requirements, based on "a collection of fake news, half- truths, and conspiracy theories". Andrew Wakefield, the disgraced former medical researcher and originator of the MMR autism hoax, and infectious disease specialist Peter Hotez, both describe TFVC's lobbying as very effective, with the rate of Texas students opting out of at least one vaccine at least doubling in around five years and over 50,000 Texas schoolchildren not being vaccinated.

== Background ==
Texans for Vaccine Choice was founded in 2015 by a group of mothers, who opposed legislation proposed by state representative Jason Villalba (R-Dallas) which would have eliminated conscientious exemptions to vaccination requirements in the state of Texas. Referring to this bill, TFVC executive director Jackie Schlegel said, "This is Texas. We believe in parental rights in Texas. Like, that is just a fundamental belief that most Texans have that parents make decisions for their children, not the state." The bill was never voted on. When he ran for re-election, Villalba faced opposition from TFVC as well as a primary challenger who ran a campaign largely based on the vaccine exemption issue. Villalba won, but stated that he believed opposition from TFVC reduced his margin of victory, and said, "I'm not interested in a suicide mission on this issue, I sense — and this is unfortunate — the only way a bill like this gets any traction is an even worse large-scale outbreak, between now and session. Short of that, I just don't think there is going to be the appetite to do this bill."

Texans for Vaccine Choice also helps parents apply for vaccine exemptions for their children, placing them at the epicenter of Travis County's rapidly growing anti-vaccination movement. TFVC is promoted alongside Andrew Wakefield in the anti-vaccination propaganda film Vaxxed.

== Political actions ==
Terri Andrews of the Immunization Collaboration of Tarrant County, a Texas Medical Association member initiative, describes TFVC as the "main anti-vaccination group in Texas". Vaccine researcher Peter Hotez notes that moderate candidates in Texas are "being cherry-picked out by candidates running on anti-vaccine platforms". One example is the 2018 Texas statehouse election for district 114, where TFVC endorsed Lisa Luby Ryan, unseating the incumbent Republican in the primary. Ryan was beaten in the general election by Democrat John Turner.

Science communicator David Gorski has criticized TFVC for publishing blog posts misrepresenting herd immunity, and accusing them of exaggerating the risks of vaccines and downplaying the benefits. Gorski has also criticized Jackie Schlegel for describing her autistic daughter as "vaccine injured", since there is compelling evidence that vaccines do not cause autism.

== See also ==
- Vaccine hesitancy
- Vaccination policy
