= TFVC =

TFVC may refer to:

- Texans for Vaccine Choice, a political action committee in the U.S state of Texas.
- Team Foundation Version Control, a version control system of Azure DevOps, formerly known as Team Foundation Server and Visual Studio Team System
