= Ana-Maria Ramos =

American politician

Member of the Texas House of Representatives from the 102nd district
- Incumbent
- Assumed office January 8, 2019
- Preceded by: Linda Koop

Personal details
- Born: June 16, 1976 (age 50) Dallas, Texas, U.S.
- Party: Democratic
- Spouse: Johnny
- Children: 2
- Education: Dallas College, Eastfield(AA); University of Texas, Arlington (BA); Southern Methodist University (JD); Texas Woman's University (MBA)
- Website: Campaign website

Ana-María Rodríguez Ramos (born June 16, 1976) is an American politician. She is a Democrat representing District 102 in the Texas House of Representatives since 2019. The 102nd district serves parts of the cities of Dallas, Richardson, and Garland.

== Political career ==
In 2018, Ramos ran against Republican incumbent Linda Koop for the 102nd District seat in the Texas House of Representatives, and won with 52.9% of the vote. She ran for re-election in 2020, and again faced Koop, this time winning 53.9% of the vote.

Ramos currently sits on the Natural Resources committee, as well as the Human Services committee.

=== Electoral record ===
2018 general election: Texas House of Representatives, District 102
| Party | Candidate | Votes | % |
|---|---|---|---|
| Democratic | Ana-Maria Ramos | 30,025 | 52.88% |
| Republican | Linda Koop | 26,758 | 47.12% |

2020 general election: Texas House of Representatives, District 102
| Party | Candidate | Votes | % |
|---|---|---|---|
| Democratic | Ana-Maria Ramos | 37,219 | 53.94% |
| Republican | Linda Koop | 31,785 | 46.06% |

2022 general election: Texas House of Representatives, District 102
| Party | Candidate | Votes | % |
|---|---|---|---|
| Democratic | Ana-Maria Ramos | 23,068 | 62.22% |
| Republican | Susan Fischer | 14,007 | 37.78% |

2024 general election: Texas House of Representatives, District 102
| Party | Candidate | Votes | % |
|---|---|---|---|
| Democratic | Ana-Maria Ramos | 35,788 | 100.00% |

2026 general election: Texas House of Representatives, District 102
| Party | Candidate | Votes | % |
|---|---|---|---|
| Democratic | Ana-Maria Ramos | 31,468 | 68.86% |
| Republican | Bonnie Abadie | 14,228 | 31.14%% |

== Personal life ==
Ramos earned a JD from SMU Dedman School of Law and an MBA from Texas Women's University. She currently works as an attorney, and as an associate professor at El Centro College.
