= 1990 United States Senate election in Texas =

- November 6, 1990
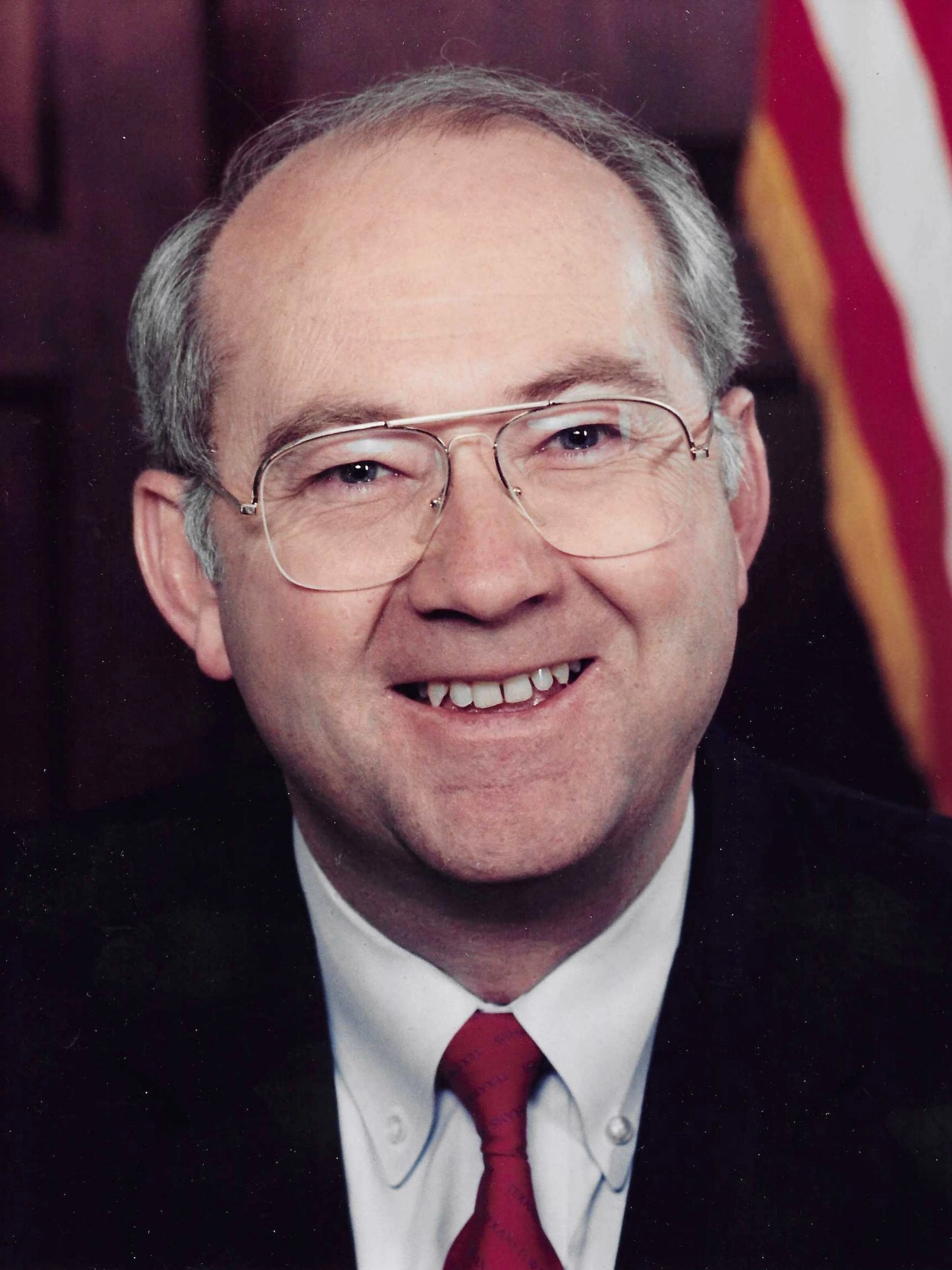

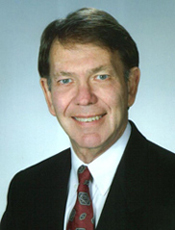
| Nominee | Phil Gramm | Hugh Parmer |
| Party | Republican | Democratic |
| Popular vote | 2,302,357 | 1,429,986 |
| Percentage | 60.24% | 37.41% |
- County results Gramm: 40–50% 50–60% 60–70% 70–80% 80–90% Parmer: 40–50% 50–60% 60–70% 70–80% Tie: 50%
U.S. senator before election
Phil Gramm
Republican
Elected U.S. Senator
Phil Gramm
Republican

The 1990 United States Senate election in Texas was held on November 6, 1990. Incumbent Republican U.S. Senator Phil Gramm won election to a second term.

== Republican primary ==
=== Candidates ===
Nominee

- Phil Gramm, incumbent U.S. Senator

== Democratic primary ==
=== Candidates ===
Nominee

- Hugh Parmer, State Senator and former Mayor of Fort Worth

Eliminated in primary

- Harley Schlanger, journalist and activist

Democratic primary results
| Party | Candidate | Votes | % |
|---|---|---|---|
| Democratic | Hugh Parmer | 766,284 | 72.58% |
| Democratic | Harley Schlanger | 289,445 | 27.42% |
| Total votes | | 1,055,729 | 100.00% |

== General election ==
Gramm, a popular incumbent who switched parties a few years prior, had over $5 million on hand. Gramm won 24% of the African American vote.

General election results
| Party | Candidate | Votes | % |
|---|---|---|---|
| Republican | Phil Gramm (incumbent) | 2,302,357 | 60.24% |
| Democratic | Hugh Parmer | 1,429,986 | 37.41% |
| Libertarian | Gary Johnson | 89,089 | 2.33% |
| Write In | Ira Calkins | 725 | 0.02% |
| Total votes | | 3,822,157 | 100.0% |
| Republican hold | | | |

== See also ==
- 1990 United States Senate elections
