= Jason Villalba =

American politician

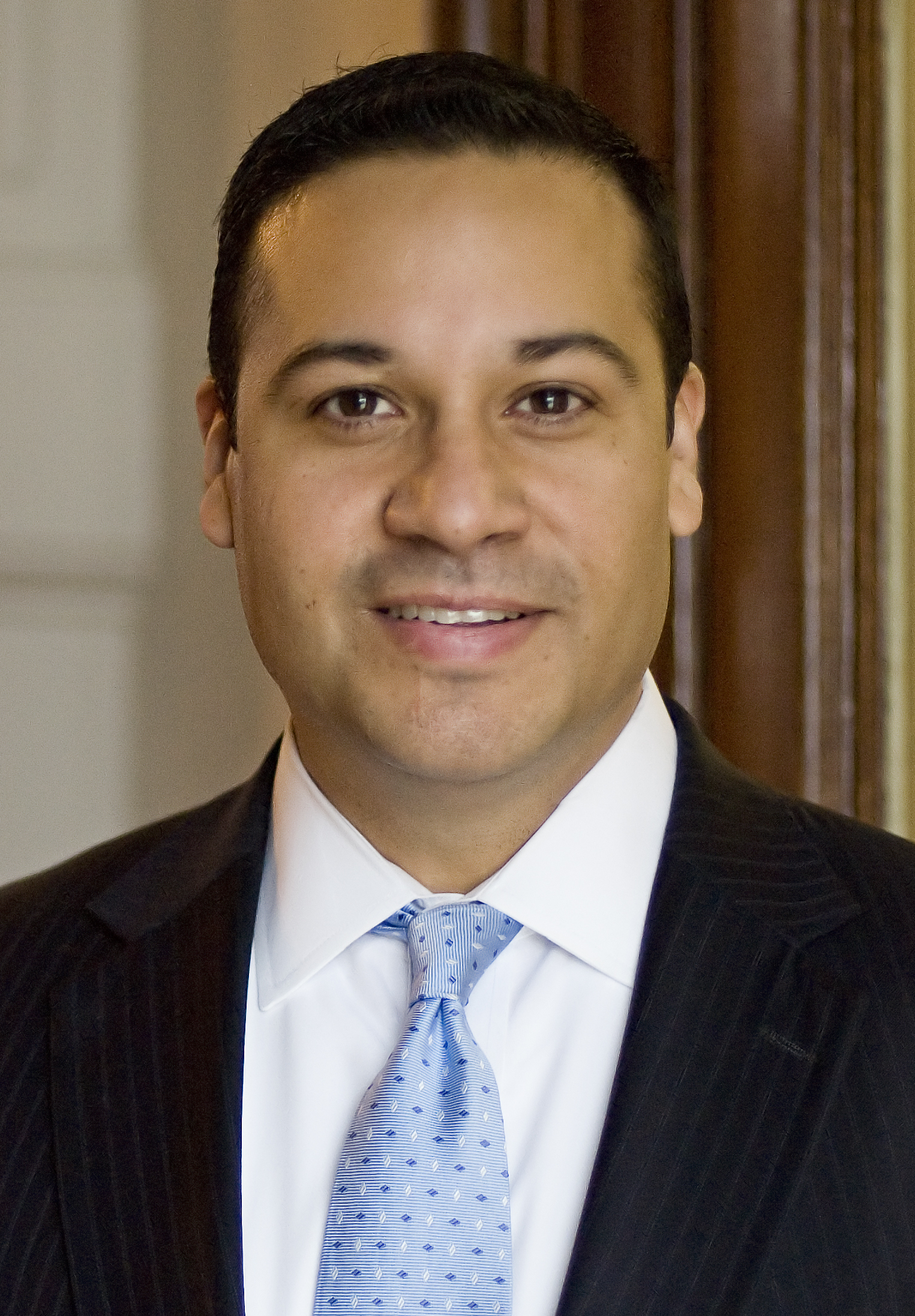

Member of the Texas House of Representatives from the 114th district
- In office January 8, 2013 – January 8, 2019
- Preceded by: Will Ford Hartnett
- Succeeded by: John Turner

Personal details
- Born: March 26, 1971 (age 55) Dallas, Texas, U.S.
- Party: Republican
- Spouse: Brooke Villalba
- Children: 3
- Education: Baylor University (BA); University of Texas at Austin (JD)
- Occupation: Attorney

Jason Villalba (born March 26, 1971) is an American politician and attorney who is a Republican former member of the Texas House of Representatives for District 114 in Dallas County. He works for the law firm Frost Brown Todd.

Villalba was defeated in the Republican primary on March 6, 2018, by Lisa Luby Ryan, who then lost the general election to the Democrat John Turner.

== Early life and education ==
A fourth-generation Texan of Mexican descent, Villalba graduated from South Grand Prairie High School in Grand Prairie in the Mid-Cities section of Dallas, Ellis, and Tarrant counties. He studied economics and finance at Baylor University, and earned his Juris Doctor degree from The University of Texas School of Law in Austin.

== Career ==
Villalba has practiced law at Haynes and Boone LLP, Gardere, and Foley and Lardner. He is currently a member in the Dallas office of Frost Brown Todd.

=== Political career ===
When Republican Representative Will Ford Hartnett did not seek reelection after twenty-two years in the legislature, Villalba won the Republican nomination in a contested runoff election in District 114. His opponent, Bill Keffer of Dallas, had been from 2003 to 2007 the representative in District 107. Villalba was endorsed by Mitt Romney and U.S. Senator Kay Bailey Hutchison. In the May 29 primary, the 1,138 votes (11.4 percent) polled by David Boone were sufficient to require a second round of balloting on July 31 between Keffer, who led with 4,745 votes (47.5 percent), and Villaba, who finished with 4,114 ballots. (41.2 percent). In the Republican runoff, Villalba defeated Keffer by a narrow margin, 6,100 (51.8 percent) to 5,683 (48.2 percent). In the general election, Villalba defeated Democratic former Representative Carol Kent, 33,970 votes (54.2 percent) to 28,762 (45.8 percent).

In 2013, Representative Villalba voted to increase numerous requirements for clinics performing abortions, which opponents argued were so strict that they could lead to the closure of every facility offering such services, and to forbid the practice after twenty weeks of gestation.

In his second month as a legislator, Villalba drew the opposition of conservatives opposed to implementation of the Patient Protection and Affordable Care Act when he conceded, with the U.S. Supreme Court's decision in June 2012 to uphold the federal health law as constitutional, that Texas should consider all available options in determining whether to implement state health-insurance exchanges to create a marketplace for those individuals without health coverage.

In December 2014, Villalba introduced HJR55, a resolution calling for an amendment to the Texas Constitution to protect freedom of religion. The measure would simultaneously strike down non-discrimination laws at the city and county level throughout Texas. The resolution was opposed by Democrats, Republicans, and business leaders and was eventually withdrawn. Eric Nicholson of the Dallas Observer stated that Villalba proposed the amendment in "direct response to Plano's new LGBT protections."

On March 10, 2015, Villalba introduced a bill that criminalizes photographing, recording, or documenting police officers from closer than 25 feet, or 100 feet if photographer has a concealed handgun license. Exceptions are made only for registered representatives of major new media organizations. House Bill 2918 may conflict with the 2011 U.S. Court of Appeals for the First Circuit ruling, Glik v. Cunniffe, which states that citizens have right to record police in action. The bill has been described as follows: "Villalba's bill would also make it illegal for private citizens to record their own interactions with police officers. In fact, the language is so broad, in prohibiting "documenting" the police officer's activities, that taking notes during a conversation with an officer, about what was being said, the officer's badge number, etc., could be construed as a violation." After heavy criticism about the bill on social media, he became the subject of a Dallas Observer blog about his blocking on Twitter of critics or even reporters asking questions.

Villalba was a legislative ally of Joe Straus, the Moderate Republican Speaker of the Texas House of Representatives from San Antonio, who left the post in 2019. In 2014, Villalba said that the Texas Senate under Lieutenant Governor Dan Patrick in 2015 would be "the most conservative in state history." He warned that a number of bills coming from the Senate would be killed by the more liberal House. Villalba said that the Straus forces would "obstruct Senate-passed reforms [through] the House Calendars Committee, where conservative bills will be strangled in the cradle."

Villalba won renomination in the Republican primary on March 1, 2016, over challenger Dan Morenoff, 11,436 votes (55.2 percent) to 9,300 (44.8 percent). He then defeated the Democrat Jim Burke, 37,588 votes (55.7 percent) to 27,367 (40.6 percent), in the November 8 general election.

Villalba unsuccessfully ran for Mayor of Dallas in 2019, receiving only 6% of the vote in the first voting round.

== Personal life ==
Villalba and his wife, Brooke, reside with their three children in the Preston Hollow neighborhood in north Dallas. He is Methodist.

Texas House of Representatives
Preceded by Will Ford Hartnett	Texas State Representative for District 114 (Dallas County); 2013–2019	Succeeded by John Turner
