= Linda Koop =

American politician

Linda Lee Fielding Koop

Member of the Texas House of Representatives from the 102nd district
- In office January 13, 2015 – January 8, 2019
- Preceded by: Stefani Carter
- Succeeded by: Ana-Maria Ramos

Member of the Dallas City Council
- In office 2005–2013

Personal details
- Born: June 21, 1950 (age 76) Dallas, Texas, U.S.
- Party: Republican
- Spouse: Myron Lee Koop (m. 1973)
- Children: 2
- Education: Hillcrest High School (Dallas) University of Texas at Dallas
- Occupation: Businesswoman

Linda Lee Fielding Koop (born June 21, 1950) is a former eight-year member of the Dallas City Council and a Republican former two-term state representative from Dallas County, Texas.

== Legislative voting history ==
In 2015, Koop voted for Joe Straus as speaker of the house. She voted in favor of HB 80, which placed a ban on texting and driving. Koop regularly has voted in favor of bills relating to occupational licensing such as HB 2267 (which would require an anesthesiologist assistant to obtain a license before practicing) and HB 1260 (which would require an occupational license for shrimp loading and off loading). Additionally, Koop voted in favor of HB 486 which would allow school districts to raise taxes without voter approval. Koop also voted in favor of the Garen Amendment of SB 19, which sought to grant special privileges to legislators and legislative staff members by categorizing their communications as confidential, reducing government transparency.

== 2018 election ==
Koop lost her bid for a third term in the state House in the general election held on November 6, 2018, when Democrats ran strongly in Dallas County. With 26,648 votes (47.2 percent), she was unseated by Democrat Ana-Maria Ramos, who led with 29,829 (52.8 percent).

Texas House of Representatives
| Preceded by Stefani Carter | Texas State Representative from District 102 (Dallas County); Linda Lee Fieldng Koop; 2015–2019 | Succeeded by Ana-Maria Ramos |
