= Julia Morales =

American journalist (born 1985)

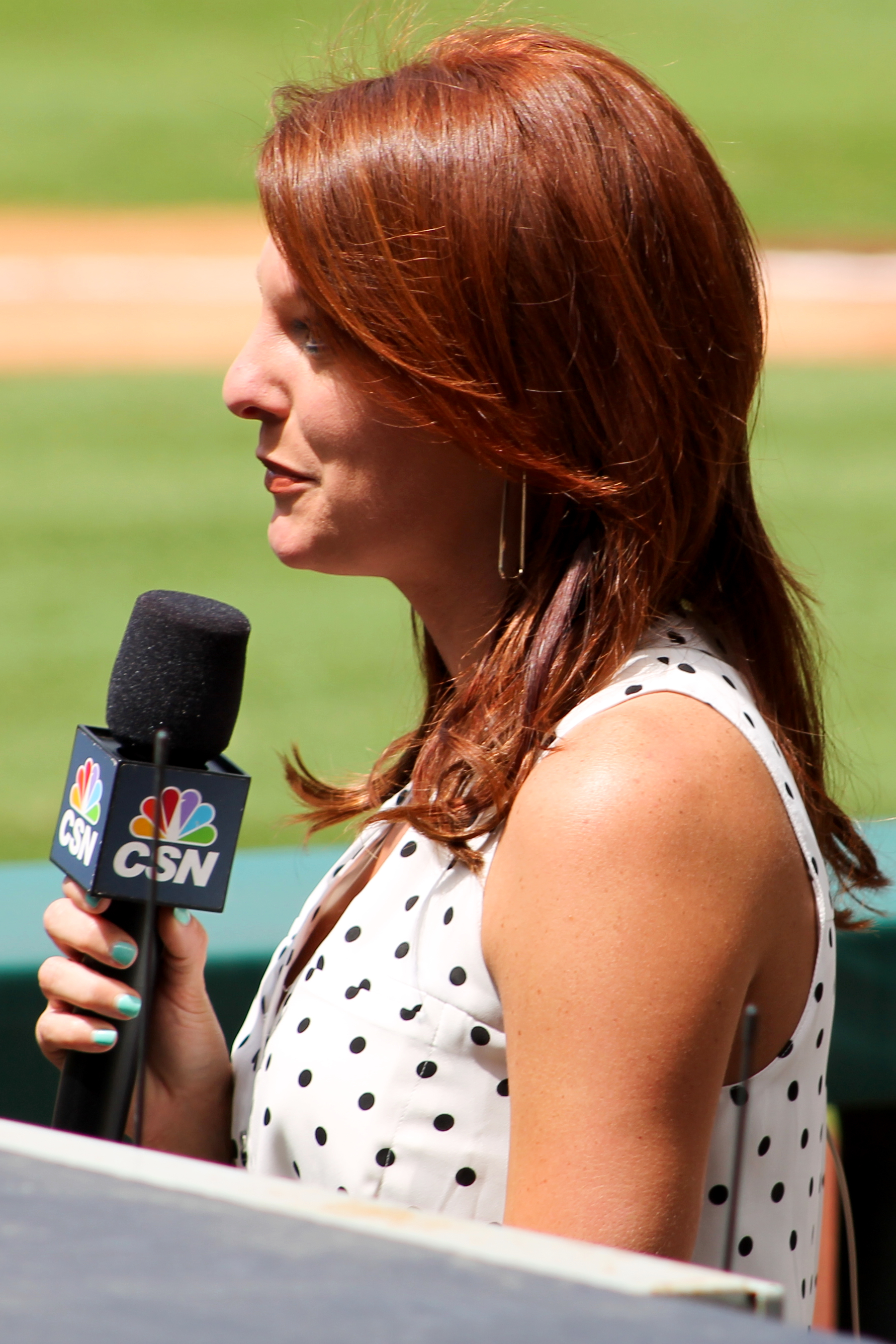
- Morales covering a Houston Astros game in 2014

Personal information
- Full name: Julia Morales Clark
- Nickname: Mrs. Astros
- Born: April 12, 1985 (age 41) Crandall, Texas, U.S.
- Education: University of Texas
- Occupation(s): Sports reporter and anchor
- Employer: Space City Home Network
- Agent: Orbit
- Website: http://juliamorales.com/
- Updated on October 17, 2014

Julia Morales Clark (born April 12, 1985) is an American sports anchor and reporter for Space City Home Network as well as the Houston Astros' sideline reporter, pregame and post game talk show star. She is in her 9th season of broadcasting for the Astros and Rockets. Prior to taking her job with Space City Home Network, she was a reporter for Time Warner Cable News. During her time, she broadcast big events including the Super Bowl, NBA Finals, and the World Series.

Before working for AT&T SportsNet Southwest, Morales spent time as a reporter at KTEN-TV in Sherman, Texas, KYTX CBS 19 in Tyler, Texas, and Your News Now in Austin, Texas. Morales is a graduate of the University of Texas, where she was a member of the Pom spirit group. She was on the sidelines for the Longhorns' national championship win in Pasadena in 2006.

On May 13, 2024, in a game between the Houston Astros and the Oakland Athletics, Morales and Jenny Cavnar became the first two women to do the play-by-play on television for the same Major League Baseball game.

== Personal life ==
A native of Crandall, Texas, Morales spent two years as a member of the Kilgore College Rangerettes before graduating from the University of Texas at Austin.

She is the daughter of Victor M. Morales, 1996 Democratic nominee for U.S. Senate in Texas. Through her father she is of Mexican descent. She has a brother, the actor and dancer Jesse Morales.

She is married to former MLB player Matt Clark, and is the daughter-in-law of former pitcher Terry Clark through this marriage.The two were together for five years before they decided to get married in November 2015.
