= Fred Agnich =

American politician (1913–2004)

Frederick Joseph "Fred" Agnich

Texas State Representative for District 114 (Dallas County)
- In office January 12, 1971 – January 10, 1989
- Preceded by: At-large districts
- Succeeded by: Tony Goolsby

Personal details
- Born: July 19, 1913 Eveleth, Minnesota, U.S.
- Died: October 28, 2004 (aged 91) Dallas, Texas, U.S.
- Resting place: Calvary Hill Cemetery in Dallas
- Party: Republican
- Spouse(s): (1) Ruth Welton Agnich (married 1939-1975, her death) (2) Brooksie Jeanne Penland Willie Agnich (m. 1977)
- Children: William Frederick Agnich Richard John Agnich; James Randall Agnich Five step-children
- Education: University of Minnesota
- Occupation: Geophysicist; Businessman

Frederick Joseph Agnich (July 19, 1913 – October 28, 2004) was a Minnesota-born geophysicist who served from 1971 to 1987 as a Republican member of the Texas House of Representatives. From 1972 to 1976, he was the Texas Republican National Committeeman.

== Background ==
Agnich was born in Eveleth in St. Louis County in northeastern Minnesota. He attended the University of Minnesota at Saint Paul, from which he received a Bachelor of Arts in geology in 1937. He immediately moved thereafter to Texas to work for Geophysical Services, Inc. The company sought to locate petroleum within the United States and abroad in such locations as Venezuela, Sumatra, and the not-yet-established Pakistan. Geophysical Services became Texas Instruments, headquartered in Dallas. In 1951, Agnich became the executive vice president of the company; president in 1956. He retired from the board at the age of forty-eight in 1961.

In 1939, Agnich married Ruth Welton, also a native of Eveleth, Minnesota. The couple had three sons, William Frederick Agnich (born c. 1942) of Richardson, Texas, Richard John Agnich (born 1943) and wife, Tory, of Dallas, and James Randall Agnich (born 1950) and wife, Betsy, of Houston, Texas. Ruth Agnich died in November 1975. Two years later, Agnich married Brooksie Jeanne Penland Willie (born 1932), the mother of three daughters and two sons.

From 1955 to 1959, Agnich was chairman of the board of Greenhill School in Addison, the first co-educational, non-denominational pre-kindergarten through grade 12 private school in the Dallas-Fort Worth metroplex. He was a trustee for the Southwest Center for Advanced Studies, since the University of Texas at Dallas. Agnich served as a director for the Dallas Museum of Art, the Dallas Opera, the Dallas Historical Society, and the Dallas Petroleum Club in the Chase Tower.

== Political life ==
Agnich raised funds for the Texas Republican Party during the 1950s and in the unsuccessful 1960 and 1964 presidential campaigns for Richard M. Nixon and Barry M. Goldwater, respectively. From 1967 to 1969, he was the Republican chairman for Dallas County, a position held prior to 1962 by then state chairman Peter J. O'Donnell, a Dallas investor and philanthropist. Agnich was elected national committeeman at the state Republican convention in 1972. Four years later he was succeeded as committeeman by another oilman, Ernest Angelo, then the mayor of Midland, who held the post until 1996. From 1974 to 1976, Angich was the vice chairman of the Republican National Committee in Washington, D.C., as well as Texas national committeeman.

In 1970, Agnich was elected to the state House of Representatives in then District 33-R, renamed District 114 in 1983. He was the first Republican elected countywide in Dallas County since Reconstruction. He won as a Republican in a heavily Democratic year with the Texas statewide candidates for U.S. senator and governor, George Herbert Walker Bush and Paul Eggers both going down to defeat at the hands of Lloyd Bentsen and Preston Smith, respectively.

In 1972, Agnich considered running for governor against Preston Smith but never filed his papers of candidacy. Instead Smith was denied re-nomination, and the Republicans chose State Senator Henry Grover of Houston, who then lost to the Democrat Dolph Briscoe of Uvalde. Agnich was also a fundraiser for Republican U.S. Senator John Tower of Texas, who won his third term in 1972. Agnich was tapped as minority leader in 1972 by his Republican House colleagues. In 1974, Representative Agnich was part of the state constitutional convention held that spring to draft a document to replace the Texas Constitution of 1876. However, the new constitution fell three votes short, 118 votes instead of 121, of the two-thirds majority required in the combined state House and Senate. In 1977, he hired young Karl Rove to his first job in Texas as a legislative assistant in Agnich's Dallas office.

Agnich served on House Appropriations and Finance and was the chairman of the Environmental Affairs Subcommittee on Wildlife throughout his 18-year career in the legislature. His interest in the environment was an outgrowth of the management during the 1960s of his 3,500-acre ranch near Athens in Henderson County east of Dallas. He built a 3,000-foot dam to fill a 500-acre lake. He turned his ranch into a wildlife refuge for the undertaking of research into habitat conservation.

In 1979, Agnich endorsed former Democratic Governor John Connally for the 1980 Republican presidential nomination, which instead went to Ronald W. Reagan, the former governor of California who then unseated Jimmy Carter, thus far the last Democrat to have won the electoral votes of Texas. Agnich was considered generally conservative. In 1975, he criticized higher education in Texas for excessive spending. Yet, he was also a member of the "Dirty Thirty" legislators who exposed the Sharpstown banking scandal in Houston and challenged the power of Speaker of the Texas House of Representatives Gus Mutscher of Washington County. He did not hesitate to use state power to promote his favorite interests, environmental legislation, and wildlife preservation, specifically the Wildlife Conservation Act of 1983.

In 1989, Agnich, with his wife Brooksie, retired to their homes in Dallas and Athens, Texas, and on Lake Lenore in Ouray, Colorado. He died of a lengthy illness in Dallas at the age of ninety-one, just days before the reelection of U.S. President George W. Bush. His widow, Brooksie, died on April 26, 2016, at the age of eighty-three.

Agnich is honored through the Fred J. Agnich Scholarship Fund at the Texas Association of Professional Geoscientists in Austin.

Texas House of Representatives
Preceded by Not available	Texas State Representative for District 114 (Dallas County); 1971–1989	Succeeded by Tony Goolsby
