= John Turner (Texas politician) =

Texas state legislator

Member of the Texas House of Representatives from the 114th district
- In office January 8, 2019 – January 10, 2023
- Preceded by: Jason Villalba
- Succeeded by: John Bryant

Personal details
- Born: John William Turner; November 12, 1974 (age 51) Crockett, Texas, U.S.
- Party: Democratic
- Spouse: Jenia Iontcheva
- Children: 2
- Parents: Jim Turner (father); Ginny Turner (mother)
- Education: Harvard University; Yale University (JD)
- Occupation: Attorney
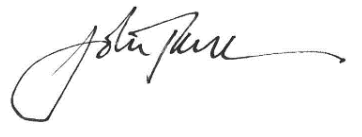
- Signature

John William Turner (born November 12, 1974) is an American lawyer and Democratic politician from Dallas, Texas, who represented district 114 in the Texas House of Representatives.

To win his seat, Turner defeated Republican Lisa Luby Ryan. Turner polled 36,744 votes (55.6 percent) to Ryan's 29,401 (44.4 percent). Ryan had earlier unseated the Republican incumbent, Jason Villalba, in the 2018 primary election.

A native of Crockett in Houston County in East Texas, Turner is one of two children of Democratic former U.S. Representative Jim Turner, who represented Texas's 2nd congressional district from 1997 to 2005. Jim Turner also served in both houses of the Texas legislature. John Turner graduated from Harvard University and Yale Law School. He formerly resided in Houston, Texas. He is now employed by the Dallas firm of Haynes and Boone and was the lead attorney for eighty-eight public school districts which fought a three-year legal battle for equitable school funding. He has represented Dallas and more than two dozen other Texas municipalities in opposition to the construction of eleven new coal-fired power plants in the state.

Since 2004, Turner has been married to the former Jenia Iontcheva, also a Yale Law graduate. She is a professor at Southern Methodist University. The couple is United Methodist and has two sons.

Texas House of Representatives
| Preceded by Jason Villalba | Texas State Representative for District 114 (Dallas County); 2019–present | Succeeded by Incumbent |
