= Stefani Carter =

American politician

Texas State Representative from District 102 (Dallas County)
- In office 2011–2015
- Preceded by: Carol Kent
- Succeeded by: Linda Koop

Personal details
- Born: February 15, 1978 (age 48) Dallas, Texas, USA
- Party: Republican
- Education: University of Texas; Harvard School of Law
- Occupation: Attorney

Stefani Carter (born February 15, 1978) is an American politician who served as a member of the Texas House of Representatives for the 102nd District, which included parts of Dallas, and the northern Dallas County suburbs of Garland, and Richardson, Texas, from 2011 to 2015. She became the first Republican African-American woman to serve in the Texas House when she unseated the Democratic incumbent Carol Kent.

== Biography ==
Carter was born in Dallas. Her mother was an elementary school teacher, and her father is an engineer turned entrepreneur, the owner of a small lawn-care company.

Carter excelled academically in school; her parents told her she would have to work her way through college. She graduated in 1996 from Plano East Senior High School and earned a full scholarship to the University of Texas at Austin, where she graduated with highest honors with a Bachelor of Arts in Government and a Bachelor of Science in Journalism. During Carter's undergraduate years at UT she interned at the White House during the Clinton administration.

After UT, Carter graduated with a Juris Doctor degree from Harvard Law School. She also obtained a master's degree in Public Policy from Harvard's John F. Kennedy School of Government. During Carter's years at Harvard, she became a Republican and contributed articles to USA Today. After law school, she returned to Dallas and served Collin County as an assistant district attorney.

=== Political career ===
Carter decided to run for office in the 102nd House District in Texas, taking on Democrat Carol Kent. Carter won by simply pointing to Kent's record as being far too liberal for her area of Dallas and that voters in the district were far more conservative than the person who was representing them. Carter won in 2010 with 54.63 percent of the vote, having unseated Kent by a ten-point margin of victory.

==== Election of 2014 ====
Carter had announced on July 9, 2013 that she would be a candidate for the Texas Railroad Commission in the Place 1 seat vacated by the outgoing incumbent, Barry Smitherman, who ran instead for Texas Attorney General in 2014 to replace the three-term incumbent, Greg Abbott, the 2014 gubernatorial nominee who seeks to succeed the retiring Governor Rick Perry.

However, on October 22, 2013, Carter announced that she was ending her bid for the Railroad Commission and would instead seek reelection to a third two-year term to her state House seat. She was defeated in the Republican primary runoff by Linda Koop in May 2014.

==== Later work ====
On November 29, 2016, Carter was named as a Transition Landing Team member for the newly elected President Donald Trump in the Department of Justice.

== Personal life ==
Carter is a practicing Catholic and was baptized in Richardson, Texas.

Texas House of Representatives
| Preceded by Carol Kent | Texas State Representative from District 102 (Dallas County); Stefani Carter; 2011-2015 | Succeeded by Linda Koop |
