= Carol Kent =

American politician (born 1953)

Carol Hittson Kent (born May 29, 1953) is a Democratic former member of the Texas House of Representatives, representing House District 102 in the Eighty-first Texas Legislature after her election in 2008. District 102 encompassed the Western part of Garland and a portion of North Dallas. In the 2008 general election, she narrowly unseated 20-year incumbent Republican Tony Goolsby. After one term, she lost her 2010 reelection bid to the Republican African-American Stefani Carter of Dallas.

== Early life ==
Kent grew up in Garland, Texas, where she graduated from South Garland High School. She received both Bachelor of Arts and Master of Arts degrees from Baylor University in Waco, Texas. She resides in the Lake Highlands area.
