= 1996 United States Senate election in Texas =

- November 5, 1996
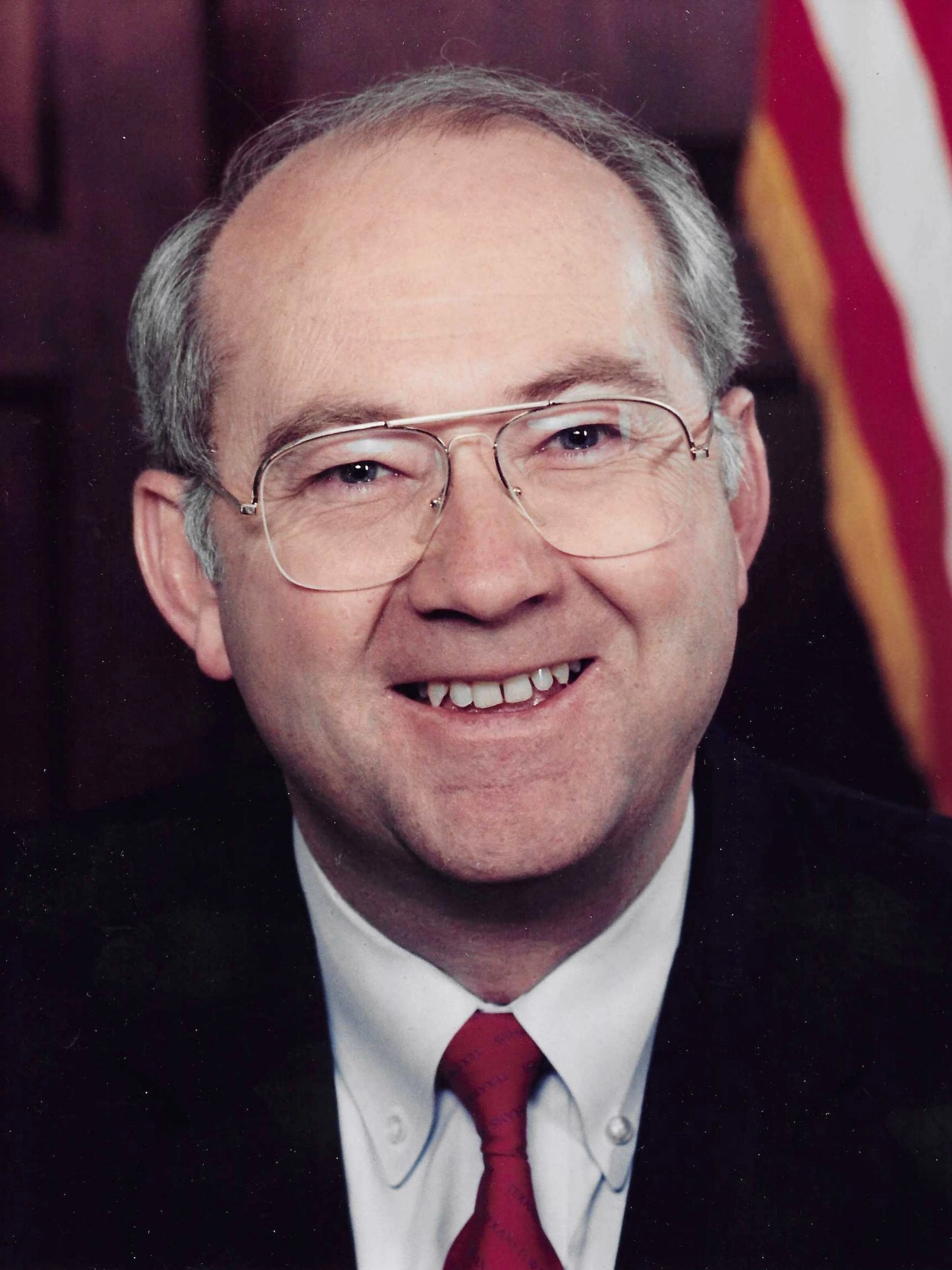

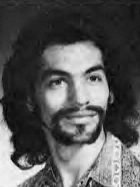
Nominee	Phil Gramm	Victor Morales
Party	Republican	Democratic
Popular vote	3,027,680	2,428,776
Percentage	54.78%	43.94%
- County results Gramm: 40–50% 50–60% 60–70% 70–80% 80–90% Morales: 40–50% 50–60% 60–70% 70–80% 80–90%
U.S. senator before election
Phil Gramm
Republican
Elected U.S. Senator
Phil Gramm
Republican

The 1996 United States Senate election in Texas was held on November 5, 1996, to elect a member of the United States Senate to represent the state of Texas.

In the Republican primary, Incumbent Republican U.S. Senator Phil Gramm easily secured the Republican nomination. In the Democratic primary, Victor Morales, a teacher and navy veteran, scored an upset victory over two incumbent U.S. Representatives to secure the nomination in a runoff.

In the general election, Gramm defeated Morales by a margin of 10.8 percentage points, securing re-election to his third and final term.

== Republican primary ==
=== Candidates ===
Nominee

- Phil Gramm, incumbent U.S. senator since 1985

Eliminated in primary

- Henry Grover, former state senator and 1972 nominee for governor
- David Young

=== Results ===
Republican primary results
Party	Candidate	Votes	%
Republican	Phil Gramm (incumbent)	838,339	85.01%
Republican	David Young	75,463	7.65%
Republican	Henry C. "Hank" Glover	72,400	7.34%
Total votes		986,202	100.00%

== Democratic primary ==
First round results by county: Morales: 30–40%; 40–50%; 50–60%; 60–70%; 70–80%; 80–90%; Bryant: 30–40%; 40–50%; 50–60%; 60–70%; 70–80%; Chapman: 30–40%; 40–50%; 50–60%; 60–70%; 70–80%; 80–90%

=== Candidates ===
Nominee

- Victor Morales, teacher and U.S. Navy veteran

Eliminated in runoff

- John Bryant, U.S. representative from Dallas

Eliminated in primary

- Jim Chapman, U.S. representative from Sulphur Springs
- John Odam, State Supreme Court litigator

=== Results ===
Democratic primary results
Party	Candidate	Votes	%
Democratic	Victor Morales	322,218	36.18%
Democratic	John Bryant	267,545	30.04%
Democratic	Jim Chapman	239,427	26.88%
Democratic	John Will Odam	61,433	6.90%
Total votes		890,623	100.00%

Runoff results by county: Morales: 50–60%; 60–70%; 70–80%; 80–90%; >90%; Bryant: 50–60%; 60–70%; 70–80%; 80–90%

=== Runoff ===
Democratic runoff results
Party	Candidate	Votes	%
Democratic	Victor Morales	246,614	51.18%
Democratic	John Bryant	235,281	48.82%
Total votes		481,895	100.00%

== General election ==
=== Candidates ===
- Michael Bird (Libertarian)
- Phil Gramm, incumbent U.S. senator since 1985 (Republican)
- John Huff (Natural Law)
- Victor Morales, teacher and U.S. Navy veteran (Democratic)

=== Campaign ===
Morales, who never ran for statewide office before, pulled a major upset in the primary by defeating three politicians: U.S. Congressman John Wiley Bryant, U.S. Congressman Jim Chapman, and former State Supreme Court litigator John Odam. In the March run-off, he defeated Bryant with 51% of the vote. He became the first minority in Texas history to become a United States Senate nominee from either major party. Despite having no staff, raising only $15,000, and not accepting any special interest money he obtained 2.5 million votes.

Gramm previously ran for President earlier in the year, but lost to fellow U.S. Senator Bob Dole in the Republican presidential primary. Gramm was the heavy favorite. A September poll showed Gramm leading 50% to 40%. A late October poll showed him leading with 53% to 31%.

Exit Polls showed that Gramm performed well with Anglos (68% to 31%), while Morales won African Americans (79% to 19%) and Latinos (79% to 20%) respectively.

=== Results ===
General election results
Party	Candidate	Votes	%
Republican	Phil Gramm (incumbent)	3,027,680	54.78%
Democratic	Victor M. Morales	2,428,776	43.94%
Libertarian	Michael Bird	51,516	0.93%
Natural Law	John Huff	19,469	0.35%
Total votes		5,527,441	100.0%
Republican hold			

== See also ==
- 1996 United States Senate elections
