= John Bryant (Texas politician) =

American politician (born 1947)

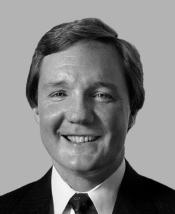
- Bryant in 1995

Member of the Texas House of Representatives from the 114th district
- Incumbent
- Assumed office January 10, 2023
- Preceded by: John Turner

Member of the U.S. House of Representatives from Texas's 5th district
- In office January 3, 1983 – January 3, 1997
- Preceded by: Jim Mattox
- Succeeded by: Pete Sessions

Member of the Texas House of Representatives from the 33-L district
- In office January 29, 1974 – January 11, 1983
- Preceded by: Joseph Hawn
- Succeeded by: Constituency abolished

Personal details
- Born: John Wiley Bryant; February 22, 1947 (age 79) Lake Jackson, Texas, U.S.
- Party: Democratic
- Education: Southern Methodist University (BA, JD)

John Wiley Bryant (born February 22, 1947) is an American politician who has represented the 114th district in the Texas House of Representatives since 2023. A member of the Democratic Party, Bryant previously represented Texas's 5th congressional district in the United States House of Representatives from 1983 to 1997 and the 33-L district in the Texas House of Representatives from 1974 to 1983.

== Early life and education ==
Bryant was born in Lake Jackson, Brazoria County, Texas. Following a B.A. at Southern Methodist University, Dallas, Texas in 1969 Bryant studied law at Southern Methodist University School of Law, where he graduated in 1972. He was also admitted to the Texas bar in 1972. Bryant served as counsel to a committee of the Texas senate in 1973.

== Political career ==
Bryant was elected to Texas house of representatives in a special election in 1974 and was reelected from 1974 to 1982.

He was elected as a Democrat to the 98th Congress in 1982 and to the six succeeding Congresses, serving from 1983 to 1997.

While in the United States House of Representatives Bryant was one of the House impeachment managers who prosecuted the case in the impeachment trial of Judge Alcee Hastings. Hastings was found guilty by the United States Senate and removed from his federal judgeship.

In 1996, Bryant was an unsuccessful candidate for the Democratic nomination for the United States Senate. In October 1997, President Clinton appointed Bryant to head the United States' delegation to the 1997 World Radiocommunication Conference, organized by the International Telecommunication Union in Geneva, and accorded him the personal rank of Ambassador.

In 2021, John Bryant filed to run for state representative in Texas's 114th district, after being out of politics for 24 years. Bryant declared, “I am so alarmed at the continued extremes to which the Trump forces have gone in trying to take our country over and now this has arrived in Texas. I want to get off the sidelines and get back into the fight.” He won the primary in May 2022. He won the general election in November 2022.

=== Opposition to reforms to increase housing supply ===
In 2023, Bryant spearheaded opposition to a bill in the Texas legislature that would have permitted accessory dwelling units (ADUs) in areas with single-family zoning. The bill was intended to increase housing supply and alleviate the housing crisis in urban areas in Texas. Bryant said that allowing ADUs would "make a commercial, uncontrollable, really unforeseeable mess out of every neighborhood in the state."

In 2024, Bryant expressed opposition to legislative proposals to permit greater residential density in single-family neighborhoods. Bryant argued, "we have plenty of land for [housing] and plenty of places to put it. You don’t need to bust up single-family neighborhoods to get affordable housing."

In 2025, Bryant voted against a bill that would remove the power of local NIMBYs to block new development, especially affordable and multifamily housing.

== Personal life ==
In the mid-1990s he was one of the co-founders of the United Baseball League (UBL) which was a planned third major league. As of 2023, Bryant is a student at Southern Methodist University's Perkins School of Theology and taking a prayer and spirituality course as he pursues a degree in Spiritual Discipline.

U.S. House of Representatives
Preceded by Jim Mattox	Member of the U.S. House of Representatives from Texas's 5th congressional district 1983–1997	Succeeded by Pete Sessions
U.S. order of precedence (ceremonial)
Preceded by Allen Boyd as Former U.S. Representative	Order of precedence of the United States as Former U.S. Representative	Succeeded by Ronald D. Coleman as Former U.S. Representative
