= Hugh Parmer =

American politician

Hugh Q. Parmer
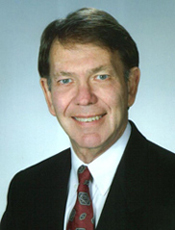

Member of the Texas Senate from the 12th district
- In office 1983–1991
- Preceded by: Betty Andujar
- Succeeded by: Mike Moncrief

Texas Senate President Pro Tempore
- In office 1989–1989
- Preceded by: Craig Washington
- Succeeded by: Bob McFarland

Member of the Texas House of Representatives from the 60-3 district
- In office 1963–1965
- Preceded by: Don Kennard
- Succeeded by: W. C. "Bud" Sherman

36th Mayor of Fort Worth
- In office April 5, 1977 – May 1, 1979
- Preceded by: Clif Overcash
- Succeeded by: Woodie Woods

Personal details
- Born: August 3, 1939
- Died: May 27, 2020 (aged 80) Fort Worth, Texas, US
- Party: Democratic
- Spouse: Evelyn G. Parmer
- Education: Yale University, University of Texas at Arlington
- Occupation: Attorney; businessman; humanitarian executive; university adjunct professor

Hugh Quay Parmer (August 3, 1939 – May 27, 2020) was an American attorney, University professor, international humanitarian executive, and Democratic politician in Fort Worth, Texas. He served in both houses of the Texas State Legislature, on the Fort Worth City Council, and as mayor of Fort Worth. Parmer also served as assistant administrator of the United States Agency for International Development and chief of the Humanitarian Response Bureau under the Agency where he was responsible for emergency U. S. response to over 80 declared disasters both natural and man-made around the world. He followed that with seven years as president and CEO of the American Refugee Committee, a U. S. based humanitarian relief organization with 2000 employees in 14 disaster and conflict impacted nations around the world.

== Humanitarian career ==
In 1998, Parmer was appointed by President Bill Clinton as the assistant administrator of the U. S. Agency for International Development (USAID) in charge of the Bureau of Humanitarian Response. Parmer was unanimously confirmed by the Republican controlled U. S. Senate. During his tenure at USAID, Parmer was largely responsible for U.S. humanitarian operations during the Kosovo War. After the election of President George W. Bush in 2000, Parmer was selected as president of the American Refugee Committee, an international humanitarian relief organization with programs in 14 conflict impacted countries around the world. In 2008, he was elected to the board of directors of Interaction, the largest association of U.S. based private relief and development organizations.

== Recent activities ==
Before his death, Parmer was an adjunct professor at the University of North Texas in Denton, Texas, Southern Methodist University in Dallas, Texas, and Texas Christian University in Fort Worth, Texas. He taught senior undergraduate and graduate seminars in International Aid, Humanitarian Intervention and Refugee Affairs.

Parmer died in Fort Worth on May 27, 2020.

Party political offices
Preceded by Lloyd Doggett	Democratic nominee for U.S. Senator from Texas (Class 2); 1990	Succeeded by Victor Morales
Texas Senate
Preceded by Betty Andujar	Texas State Senator from District 12 (Tarrant County); 1983–1991	Succeeded by Mike Moncrief
Preceded by Craig Anthony Washington	Texas State Senate President Pro Tempore; 1989	Succeeded by Bob McFarland
Texas House of Representatives
Preceded by Don Kennard	Texas State Representative from District 60-3 (Tarrant County); 1963–1965	Succeeded by W. C. "Bud" Sherman
Political offices
Preceded by Clif Overcash	Mayor of Fort Worth, Texas; 1977–1979	Succeeded by Woodie Woods
