= Texas's 102nd House of Representatives district =

American legislative district

Texas's 102nd State House of Representatives district
Representative
Ana-Maria Ramos; D–Dallas
- Demographics: 26.3% White; 26.9% Black; 33.4% Hispanic; 13.0% Asian
- Population (2020) • Voting age: 187,686; 141,854

The 102nd district of the Texas House of Representatives consists of portions of Dallas, Garland, and Richardson in Dallas County. The current representative is Ana-Maria Ramos, who has represented the district since 2019.
