= Phil Gramm =

American economist and politician (born 1942)

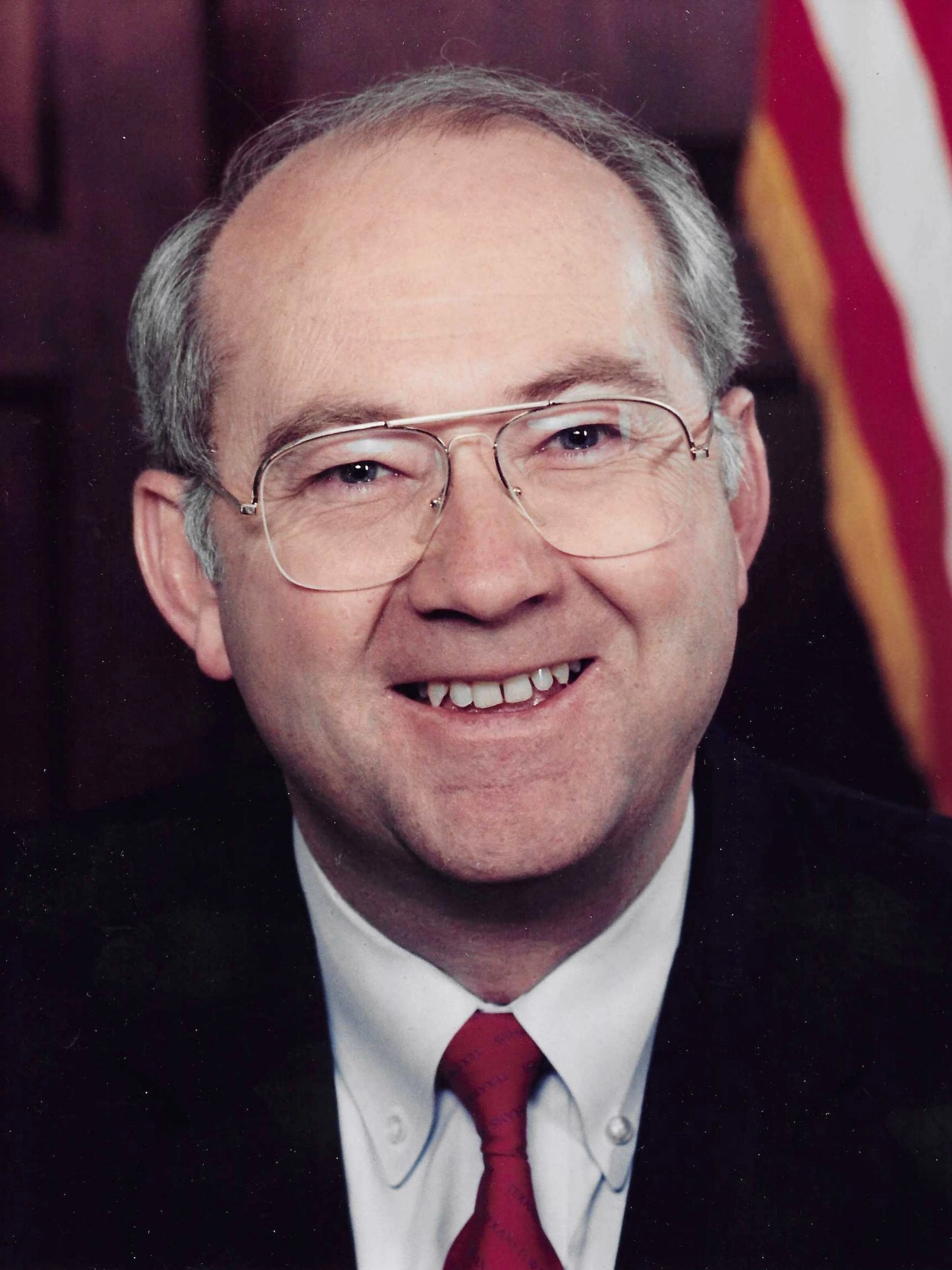

United States Senator from Texas
- In office January 3, 1985 – November 30, 2002
- Preceded by: John Tower
- Succeeded by: John Cornyn
Senate positions
Chair of the Senate Banking Committee
In office January 20, 2001 – June 6, 2001
Preceded by	Paul Sarbanes
Succeeded by	Paul Sarbanes
In office January 3, 1999 – January 3, 2001
Preceded by	Al D'Amato
Succeeded by	Paul Sarbanes
Ranking Member of the Senate Banking Committee
In office June 6, 2001 – November 30, 2002
Preceded by	Paul Sarbanes
Succeeded by	Paul Sarbanes
In office January 3, 2001 – January 20, 2001
Preceded by	Paul Sarbanes
Succeeded by	Paul Sarbanes

Member of the U.S. House of Representatives from Texas's 6th district
- In office February 12, 1983 – January 3, 1985
- Preceded by: Himself (Note: Gramm resigned his seat in protest of being thrown off the House Budget Committee and successfully ran in a special election 39 days later, caused by his own resignation, as a Republican.)
- Succeeded by: Joe Barton
- In office January 3, 1979 – January 5, 1983
- Preceded by: Olin Teague
- Succeeded by: Himself

Personal details
- Born: William Philip Gramm; July 8, 1942 (age 84) Fort Benning, Georgia, U.S.
- Party: Democratic (before 1983); Republican (1983–present)
- Spouse: Wendy Lee
- Children: 2
- Education: University of Georgia (BA, MA, PhD)
- Gramm's voice Gramm questioning Alan Greenspan at his renomination hearing for Chair of the Federal Reserve. Recorded January 26, 2000

William Philip Gramm (born July 8, 1942) is an American economist and politician who represented Texas in both chambers of Congress. Though he began his political career as a Democrat, Gramm switched to the Republican Party in 1983. Gramm was an unsuccessful candidate in the 1996 Republican Party presidential primaries against eventual nominee Bob Dole.

== Early life and education ==
Gramm was born on July 8, 1942, in Fort Benning, Georgia, and grew up in nearby Columbus. Soon after his birth, Gramm's father, Kenneth Marsh Gramm, a career Army sergeant, suffered a stroke and was partially paralyzed. He died when Gramm was 14. Gramm's mother, Florence (née Scroggins), worked double shifts as a nurse to supplement the veterans disability pension.

Gramm attended public schools, graduated in 1961 from Georgia Military Academy (now Woodward Academy), and graduated in 1964 from the University of Georgia, where he was a member of the Phi Kappa Literary Society. He received a doctorate in economics from the University of Georgia's Terry College of Business in 1967.

== Career ==
Gramm taught economics at Texas A&M University from 1967 to 1978. In addition to teaching, Gramm founded the economic consulting firm Gramm and Associates (1971–1978).

=== United States House of Representatives ===
In 1976, Gramm unsuccessfully challenged Texas Democratic Senator Lloyd Bentsen, in the party's senatorial primary. Then in 1978, Gramm successfully ran as a Democrat for Representative from Texas's 6th congressional district, which stretched from the Fort Worth suburbs to College Station. He was reelected to his House seat as a Democrat in 1980.

Gramm's voting record was very conservative, even by Texas Democratic standards of the time. During his first four terms, he tallied an average rating of 89 from the American Conservative Union, and from 1980 to 1982 he garnered the highest rating from that body of any Democrat in the Texas delegation. In 1981, he co-sponsored the Gramm-Latta Budget which implemented President Ronald Reagan's economic program, increased military spending, cut other spending, and mandated the Economic Recovery Tax Act of 1981 (the Kemp-Roth Tax Cut).

Just days after being reelected in 1982, Gramm was thrown off the House Budget Committee. In response, Gramm resigned his House seat on January 5, 1983. He then ran as a Republican for his own vacancy in a February 12, 1983 special election, and won easily. One of his many special election opponents was the second-place finisher by only 115 votes in his 1978 Democratic Party primary, the then newly elected State Senator Chet Edwards of Waco, and later U.S. Representative for the 11th and the 17th congressional districts of Texas (January 3, 1991 – January 3, 2011). Another special election opponent was Texas State Representative Dan Kubiak of Rockdale, Texas. Gramm became the first Republican to represent the district since its creation in 1846.

After he left the House, the seat was retained for the Republican Party by Joe Barton.

=== United States Senate ===
In 1984, Gramm was elected as a Republican to represent Texas in the U.S. Senate. He defeated Congressman Ron Paul, former gubernatorial nominee Henry Grover, Robert Mosbacher Jr., of Houston, and several of other contenders in the primary. He then faced the Democratic nominee, State Senator Lloyd Doggett of Austin in the general election for the right to succeed retiring Republican Senator John G. Tower. Gramm polled 3,116,348 votes (58.5%) to Doggett's 2,207,557 (41.5%). Gramm was the first U.S. Senate candidate in the history of Texas to receive more than three million votes.

In October 1985, Gramm, Fritz Hollings, and Warren Rudman sponsored an amendment to establish a budget deficits ceiling that would decline to zero by 1991 that was attached to a bill raising the debt limit of the federal government by more than $250 billion. The amendment was approved by a 75–24 vote and was stated as a possible prelude to a balanced budget in five years without a tax increase by Treasury Secretary James Baker: "I think it's important that we recognize the Gramm-Rudman amendment is basically a process designed to give the legislative branch and in some degree the executive branch, the political will to deal with the deficit. It means it's going to force some action. Given the political will to make the hard choices you can reach balance without having to raise taxes."

Gramm served on the Senate Budget Committee from 1989 until leaving office in 2002. Gramm and Senators Fritz Hollings and Warren Rudman devised a means of cutting the budget through across-the-board spending cuts if deficit-reduction targets were not met. They were successful in making the Gramm–Rudman–Hollings Act law, although portions were ruled unconstitutional. In the years following the passage of the Act, other sections were largely superseded by other budget-controlling mechanisms.

In 1990, Gramm failed in an effort to amend the Iraq International Law Compliance Act of 1990. An earlier amendment to the act, the D'Amato Amendment, prohibited the US from selling arms or extending any sort of financial assistance to Iraq unless the President could prove Iraq was in "substantial compliance" with the provisions of a number of human rights conventions, including the Genocide Convention. After reading the D'Amato Amendment, Gramm introduced his own amendment to counter the human rights sanctions in the D'Amato Amendment. Gramm's amendment would have allowed the George Bush administration to waive the terms of the D'Amato Amendment if it found that sanctions against Iraq hurt US businesses and farms more than they hurt Iraq. In the end, the bill passed the Senate without Gramm's amendment only a week before Saddam Hussein invaded Kuwait.

Gramm won his second Senate term in 1990 with a victory over Democratic State Senator and former Fort Worth Mayor Hugh Parmer. Gramm polled 3,027,680 votes (60.2%) to Parmer's 1,429,986 (37.4%), again receiving more than three million votes.

Between 1999 and 2001, Gramm was the chairman of the U.S. Senate Committee on Banking, Housing, and Urban Affairs. During that time he spearheaded efforts to pass banking deregulation laws, including the landmark Gramm–Leach–Bliley Act in 1999, which removed Depression-era laws separating banking, insurance, and brokerage activities.

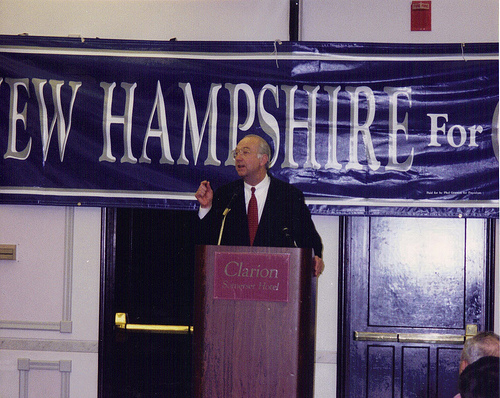
Gramm at a campaign event in Nashua, New Hampshire in 1995

As a senator, Gramm often called for reductions in taxes and fraud in government spending. He employed his "Dickey Flatt Test" ("Is it worth taking it out of Dickey's pocket?") to determine if federal programs were worthwhile. Richard "Dickey" Flatt owns a family-run printing business started by his father and mother in Mexia, Texas, and is a longtime Gramm supporter. In Gramm's eyes, Flatt embodied the burdens that a typical Texas independent small businessman faced in the realm of taxation and government spending.

In spite of his self-proclaimed opposition to Federal spending, Gramm voted to have the Federal Government build the Superconducting Super Collider in his state, which would have cost billions of dollars of taxpayer money.

Gramm ran unsuccessfully for the Republican Party nomination in the 1996 presidential election, for which he had raised $8 million as early as July 1994. Although he began the race with a full war-chest and tied for first place with Dole in the 1995 Iowa Straw Poll, his campaign was fatally wounded In 1995 when the scandal broke out that he had previously invested in the porn movies industry, which led the New York Post to nickname him "Porno-Gramm". Consequently, he lost the Louisiana Caucus on February 7, 1996, to Pat Buchanan (the final delegate count was 13–8). New Orleans Times Picayune political columnist Otis Pike noted the loss could be traced to the passion of the supporters for Buchanan compared to those for Gramm. "Gramm should have won the Louisiana caucuses – but didn't, because the religious right turned out to vote in larger numbers." At least part of this was because James Dobson infamously said, "I walked into that meeting fully expecting to support Phil Gramm for President. Now I don't think I'd vote for him if he was the last man standing." This poor showing in a state adjacent to Texas plus placing 5th in Iowa's caucuses resulted in Gramm's withdrawal from the contest on the Sunday before the New Hampshire primary. He threw his support to a senatorial colleague Robert J. Dole of Kansas. Gramm, a proponent of free trade, also lashed out at Buchanan, arguing that Buchanan was a "protectionist".

After abandoning his presidential bid, Gramm refocused on his bid for a third Senate term. He defeated Victor Morales of Dallas in November 1996 to win what would be his final term in the Senate.

Gramm was one of five co-sponsors of the Commodity Futures Modernization Act of 2000. One provision of the bill is often referred to as the "Enron loophole" because some critics blame the provision for permitting the Enron scandal to occur. Wendy Gramm was an Enron Board member and her husband was the second-largest recipient of campaign contributions from Enron, succeeded in legislating California's energy commodity trading deregulation. Despite warnings from prominent consumer groups which stated that this law would give energy traders too much influence over energy commodity prices, the legislation was passed in December 2000.

In 2002, Gramm left his Senate seat (effective November 30) a few weeks before the expiration of his term in hopes that his successor, fellow Republican John Cornyn, could gain seniority over other newly elected senators. However, Cornyn did not gain additional seniority due to a 1980 Rules Committee policy.

==== 2007 mortgage and 2008 financial and economic crises ====
Some economists state that the 1999 legislation spearheaded by Gramm and signed into law by President Clinton—the Gramm–Leach–Bliley Act—was significantly to blame for the 2007 subprime mortgage crisis and 2008 global economic crisis. The Act is most widely known for repealing portions of the Glass–Steagall Act, which had regulated the financial services industry. The Act passed the House and Senate by an overwhelming majority on November 4, 1999.

Gramm responded in March 2008 to criticism of the act by stating that he saw "no evidence whatsoever" that the sub-prime mortgage crisis was caused in any way "by allowing banks and securities companies and insurance companies to compete against each other".

Gramm's support was later critical in the passage of the Commodity Futures Modernization Act of 2000, which kept derivatives transactions, including those involving credit default swaps, free of government regulation.

In its 2008 coverage of the financial crisis, The Washington Post named Gramm one of seven "Key Players In the Battle Over Regulating Derivatives", for having "pushed through several major bills to deregulate the banking and investment industries, including the 1999 Gramm–Leach–Bliley act that brought down the walls separating the commercial banking, investment and insurance industries".

2008 Nobel Laureate in Economics Paul Krugman, a supporter of Barack Obama and former President Bill Clinton, described Gramm during the 2008 presidential race as "the high priest of deregulation," and has listed him as the number two person responsible for the Great Recession behind only Alan Greenspan. On October 14, 2008, CNN ranked Gramm number seven in its list of the 10 individuals most responsible for the current economic crisis.

In January 2009, Guardian City editor Julia Finch identified Gramm as one of 25 people who were at the heart of the financial meltdown. Time included Gramm in its list of the Top 25 people to blame for the economic crisis.

=== Career with UBS ===
As of 2009, Gramm is employed by UBS AG as a vice chairman of the Investment Bank division. UBS.com states that a vice chairman of a UBS division is "...appointed to support the business in their relationships with key clients." He joined UBS in 2002 immediately after retiring from the Senate.

=== John McCain 2008 presidential campaign ===
Gramm was co-chair of John McCain's presidential campaign and his most senior economic adviser from the summer of 2007 until July 18, 2008. In a July 9, 2008 interview on McCain's economic plans, Gramm explained the nation was not in a recession, stating, "You've heard of mental depression; this is a mental recession." He added, "We have sort of become a nation of whiners, you just hear this constant whining, complaining about a loss of competitiveness, America in decline." Gramm's comments immediately became a campaign issue. McCain's opponent, Senator Barack Obama, stated, "America already has one Dr. Phil. We don't need another one when it comes to the economy. ... This economic downturn is not in your head." McCain strongly denounced Gramm's comments. On July 18, 2008, Gramm stepped down from his position with the McCain campaign. Explaining his remarks, Gramm stated that he had used the word "whiners" to describe the nation's politicians rather than the public, stating "the whiners are the leaders." In the same interview, Gramm said, "I'm not going to retract any of it. Every word I said was true."

=== 2016 Republican presidential primary ===
After the Iowa Caucus, Gramm referred to the 2016 presidential election cycle as "scary". He said of Donald Trump, "I'll have to admit I don't find Trump much more reassuring" than Hillary Clinton or Bernie Sanders "in terms of economic policy", but did not believe Trump would be the nominee. Gramm endorsed U.S. Senator Marco Rubio in the 2016 Republican presidential primary stating: "He's the best prepared on national security. He can win the general election." Upon Rubio's withdrawal from the race, Gramm endorsed fellow Texan Ted Cruz, calling him "a fearless leader and fighter for conservatives all over the country".

== Personal life ==
Gramm lives in Helotes, Texas. He is married to Wendy Lee Gramm, a native of Hawaii, who is associated with George Mason University's Mercatus Center in Virginia, and is known for being involved in Enron scandal. They have two sons: Marshall Gramm, a professor of economics at Rhodes College in Memphis, Tennessee, and Jeff Gramm, a money manager, author, and previously a musician in the indie pop band Aden. Gramm is an Episcopalian.

After the 1999 Aggie Bonfire collapse, Gramm offered the F-16 flyover reserved for his future funeral as a U.S. senator to be given instead to the Texas A&M community. The offer was accepted and a memorial flyover for the 12 killed was flown at a Texas A&M football game on November 26, 1999.

== Works ==
- Ekelund, R.B., Jr., E.G. Furubotn, and W.P. Gramm, eds. "The Evolution of Modern Demand Theory: A Collection of Essays." Lexington, MA: Lexington Books, 1972.
- Gramm, William P. (1974). "Laissez-Faire and the Optimum Quantity of Money". Economic Inquiry. 12 (1): 125–132. doi:10.1111/j.1465-7295.1974.tb00232.x.
- Anders, Gerhard, Phillip Gramm, and Charles W. Smithson. "The Economics of Mineral Extraction." New York: Praeger, 1980.
- Gramm, Phil. "The Role of Government in a Free Society: A Collection of Speeches and Articles." Dallas: Fisher Institute, 1982.
- Gramm, Phil, Robert Ekelund, John Early. “The Myth of American Inequality: How Government Biases Policy Debate.” Rowman & Littlefield, 2022.
- Gramm, Phil, Boudreaux, Donald J. "The Triumph of Economic Freedom." Rowman & Littlefield, 2025.

== See also ==
- List of United States representatives who switched parties

== Notes ==
U.S. House of Representatives
Preceded by Olin Teague	Member of the U.S. House of Representatives from Texas's 6th congressional district 1979–1985	Succeeded by Joe Barton
Party political offices
Preceded by John Tower	Republican nominee for U.S. Senator from Texas (Class 2); 1984, 1990, 1996	Succeeded by John Cornyn
Preceded by Don Nickles	Chair of the National Republican Senatorial Committee; 1991–1995	Succeeded by Al D'Amato
Preceded by Thomas Kean	Keynote Speaker of the Republican National Convention; 1992	Succeeded by Susan Molinari
Preceded by Kay Bailey Hutchison	Chair of the Senate Republican Steering Committee; 1997–2001	Succeeded by Jon Kyl
U.S. Senate
Preceded by John Tower	United States Senator (Class 2) from Texas; 1985–2002; Served alongside: Lloyd Bentsen, Bob Krueger, Kay Bailey Hutchison	Succeeded by John Cornyn
Preceded by Al D'Amato	Chair of the Senate Banking Committee; 1999–2001	Succeeded by Paul Sarbanes
Preceded by Paul Sarbanes	Ranking Member of the Senate Banking Committee; 2001–2003	Succeeded by Paul Sarbanes
U.S. order of precedence (ceremonial)
Preceded by Bill Nelson as Former U.S. Senator	Order of precedence of the United States as Former U.S. Senator	Succeeded by Russ Feingold as Former U.S. Senator
