= Jim Chapman (politician) =

American business and political leader

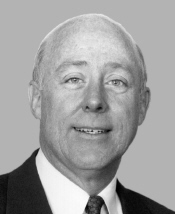

Member of the U.S. House of Representatives from Texas's 1st district
- In office August 3, 1985 – January 3, 1997 (Note: Chapman's official service begins on the date of the special election, while he was not sworn in until September 4, 1985.)
- Preceded by: Sam B. Hall
- Succeeded by: Max Sandlin

Personal details
- Born: James Louis Chapman; March 8, 1945 (age 81) Washington, D.C., U.S.
- Party: Democratic
- Education: University of Texas, Austin (BBA); Southern Methodist University (JD)

James Louis Chapman (born March 8, 1945) is an American business and political leader. From 1985 to 1997, he served as Democratic congressman representing the Texas's 1st congressional district in the United States House of Representatives. His home town was Sulphur Springs.

== Early life ==
Chapman was born in Washington, D.C. He attended public schools in Sulphur Springs; he received an undergraduate degree in business administration from the University of Texas at Austin (1968) and a J.D. degree from the Southern Methodist University School of Law in Dallas, Texas (1970).

After a stint in private practice, Chapman became the District Attorney for the Eighth Judicial District of Texas from 1976 to 1985, during which he achieved a 99 percent conviction record and a national reputation as a tough, law and order prosecutor. Chapman served in leadership roles with the Texas District and County Attorneys Association and the National District Attorneys Association. Later, he set up his own practice and was senior partner of the law firm of Chapman, Price, Hughes & Bauer. He also became chairman of a local community bank.

== Congressional career ==
Chapman was elected in 1985 as a Democrat in the 99th Congress during a highly visible special election to fill the vacancy caused by the resignation of U.S. Representative Sam B. Hall. He defeated the Republican choice, Edd Hargett, a former professional football player, by just over 1,900 votes. However, he would never face another contest anywhere near that close, and was reelected to the five succeeding Congresses (August 3, 1985 – January 3, 1997). He was not a candidate for reelection to the One Hundred Fifth Congress in 1996, but was an unsuccessful candidate for nomination to the United States Senate in 1996.

While in Congress, Chapman served four years on the Democratic Steering and Policy Committee, which sets committee assignments and the legislative agenda for the caucus. He also served as chairman of the Texas Democratic congressional delegation and as a member of the Democratic Whip organization.

Chapman served on the House Appropriations Committee, working on numerous projects including restoration and development of an Army Corps of Engineers-maintained East Texas lake called Cooper Lake, located between Cooper and Sulphur Springs. In honor of his work, Congress later enacted legislation formally renaming the lake as "Jim Chapman Lake." Prior to his service on the Appropriations Committee, he served on the Public Works and Transportation Committee; Small Business Committee; and the Science, Space and Technology Committee. Chapman gained notoriety during the Clinton–Lewinsky scandal when it was revealed in the Starr Report that President Clinton was receiving fellatio from Monica Lewinsky while on the phone with Chapman on November 15, 1995 between 9:25pm and 9:30pm.

U.S. House of Representatives
Preceded by Sam B. Hall	Member of the U.S. House of Representatives from Texas's 1st congressional district 1985–1997	Succeeded by Max Sandlin
U.S. order of precedence (ceremonial)
Preceded by Michael A. Andrews as Former U.S. Representative	Order of precedence of the United States as Former U.S. Representative	Succeeded by Ciro Rodriguez as Former U.S. Representative
