= 1998 Texas Attorney General election =

- November 3, 1998
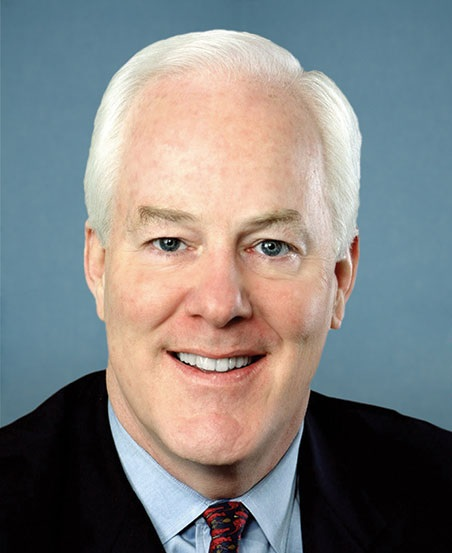

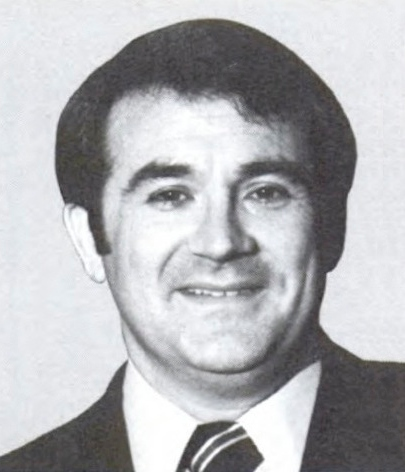
Nominee	John Cornyn	Jim Mattox
Party	Republican	Democratic
Popular vote	2,002,794	1,631,045
Percentage	54.26%	44.18%
- County results Cornyn: 40–50% 50–60% 60–70% 70–80% Mattox: 40–50% 50–60% 60–70% 70–80% 80–90%
Attorney General before election
Dan Morales
Democratic
Elected Attorney General
John Cornyn
Republican

The 1998 Texas Attorney General election took place on November 3, 1998, to elect the Texas Attorney General. Incumbent Democratic Attorney General Dan Morales chose not to seek re-election to a third term.

Former Justice of the Texas Supreme Court John Cornyn beat Democratic nominee and former Attorney General Jim Mattox, 54% to 44%. Cornyn became the first Republican elected Attorney General since Reconstruction.

== Republican primary ==
=== Candidates ===
==== Nominee ====
- John Cornyn, former Justice of the Texas Supreme Court. (1991–1997)

==== Eliminated in runoff ====
- Barry Williamson, Railroad Commissioner of Texas.

==== Eliminated in primary ====
- Tom Pauken, former chairman of the Texas Republican Party. (1994–1997)

First round results map by county: Williamson: 30–40% 40–50% 50–60% 60–70% 70–80% >90%; Cornyn: 30–40% 40–50% 50–60% 60–70% 70–80% >90%; Pauken: 30–40% 40–50% 50–60% 60–70% 70–80% >90%

=== Results ===
Republican primary
Party	Candidate	Votes	%
Republican	Barry Williamson	208,345	38.10%
Republican	John Cornyn	176,269	32.24%
Republican	Tom Pauken	162,180	29.66%
Total votes		546,794	100.00%

Runoff results map by county: Cornyn: 50–60% 60–70% 70–80% 80–90% >90%; Williamson: 50–60% 60–70% 70–80% 80–90% >90%

=== Runoff ===
Republican primary runoff
Party	Candidate	Votes	%
Republican	John Cornyn	135,130	57.91%
Republican	Barry Williamson	98,218	42.09%
Total votes		233,348	100.00%

== Democratic primary ==
=== Candidates ===
==== Nominee ====
- Jim Mattox, former Texas Attorney General. (1983–1991)

==== Eliminated in primary ====
- Morris Overstreet, judge of the Texas Court of Criminal Appeals.
- Gene Kelley, perennial candidate.

Runoff results map by county: Mattox: 40–50% 50–60% 60–70% 70–80% 80–90%; Overstreet: 40–50% 50–60%

=== Results ===
Democratic primary
Party	Candidate	Votes	%
Democratic	Jim Mattox	444,746	67.99%
Democratic	Morris Overstreet	122,311	18.70%
Democratic	Gene Kelley	87,097	13.31%
Total votes		654,154	100.00%

== General election ==
=== Results ===
1998 Texas Attorney General election
Party	Candidate	Votes	%
Republican	John Cornyn	2,002,794	54.26%
Democratic	Jim Mattox	1,631,045	44.18%
Libertarian	Mike Angwin	57,604	1.56%
Total votes		3,691,443	100.00%
Republican gain from Democratic			
