= Dennis Nixon =

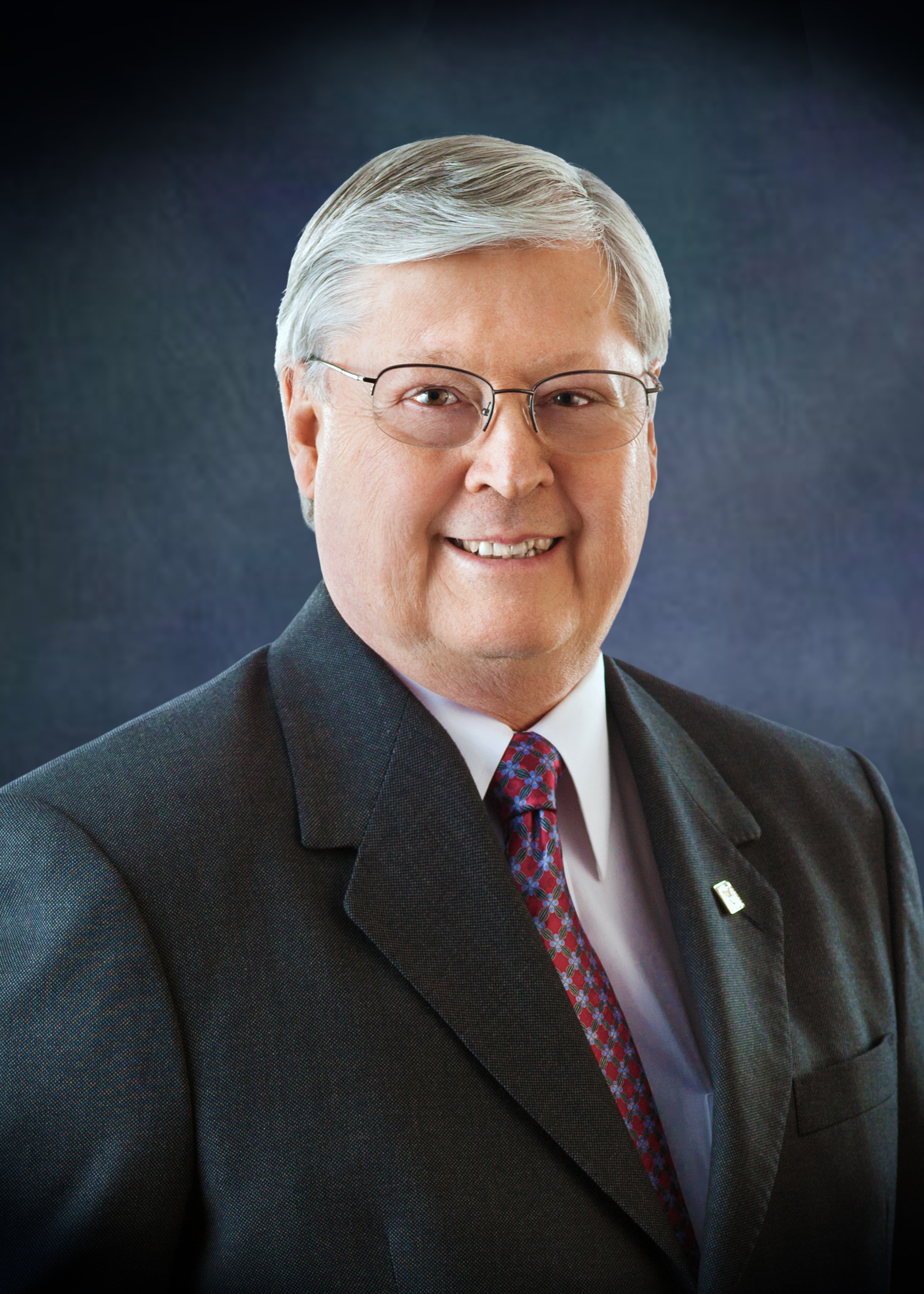
Dennis E. Nixon, CEO International Bank of Commerce

Dennis E. Nixon is the CEO of International Bank of Commerce in Laredo, Texas since 1975 and Chairman of International Bancshares Corporation, the largest minority-owned bank organization in the continental United States.

He was inducted into the Texas Business Hall of Fame in 2006.

In 2008, Nixon was named "2008 International Citizen of the Year" by the World Affairs Council of San Antonio.

In 2010, he was honored as "Mr. South Texas" by the Washington's Birthday Celebration Association.

Nixon is a graduate of the University of Texas. He is married to Elma “Bavi” Herrera Nixon, and has three children and four grandchildren.

In April 2020, Governor Greg Abbott named Nixon to the Strike Force to Open Texas – a group "tasked with finding safe and effective ways to slowly reopen the state" amid the COVID-19 pandemic.
