= 1990 Texas Attorney General election =

- November 6, 1990
| Nominee | Dan Morales | J.E. "Buster" Brown |
| Party | Democratic | Republican |
| Popular vote | 1,963,714 | 1,708,110 |
| Percentage | 51.90% | 45.15% |
- County results Morales: 40–50% 50–60% 60–70% 70–80% 80–90% >90% Brown: 40–50% 50–60% 60–70% 70–80%
Attorney General before election
Jim Mattox
Democratic
Elected Attorney General
Dan Morales
Democratic

The 1990 Texas Attorney General election took place on November 6, 1990, to elect the Texas Attorney General. Incumbent Democratic Attorney General Jim Mattox chose to run for governor instead of seeking re-election to a third term. In the Democratic primary, Dan Morales, a state representative from San Antonio, narrowly defeated Houston lawyer John Odam. In the Republican primary, J.E. "Buster" Brown, a state senator from Lake Jackson, defeated three other candidates, avoiding a runoff against state representative Patricia Hill by just 637 votes.

In the general election, Morales defeated Brown by a margin of 6.8 percentage points.

== Democratic primary ==
=== Candidates ===
==== Nominee ====
- Dan Morales, state representative from the 124th district

==== Eliminated in primary ====
- John Odam, Houston lawyer

==== Withdrew ====
- John Bryant, U.S. Representative from Texas's 5th congressional district

=== Results ===
March 13, 1990 Democratic primary
| Party | Candidate | Votes | % |
|---|---|---|---|
| Democratic | Dan Morales | 674,975 | 53.89% |
| Democratic | John Odam | 577,451 | 46.11% |
| Total votes | | 1,252,426 | 100.00% |

== Republican primary ==
=== Candidates ===
==== Nominee ====
- J.E. "Buster" Brown, State Senator from the 17th district

==== Elimenated in primary ====
- Patricia Hill, state representative from the 102nd district
- Tex Lezar, Dallas lawyer and former aide and speechwriter for former President Richard Nixon
- Bobby Steelhammer, Houston lawyer

=== Results ===
March 13, 1990 Republican primary
| Party | Candidate | Votes | % |
|---|---|---|---|
| Republican | J.E. "Buster" Brown | 359,721 | 50.09% |
| Republican | Patricia Hill | 200,255 | 27.89% |
| Republican | Tex Lezar | 109,549 | 15.25% |
| Republican | Bobby Steelhammer | 48,643 | 6.77% |
| Total votes | | 718,168 | 100.00% |

== General election ==
=== Results ===
November 6, 1990 Texas Attorney General election
| Party | Candidate | Votes | % |
|---|---|---|---|
| Democratic | Dan Morales | 1,963,714 | 51.90% |
| Republican | J.E. "Buster" Brown | 1,708,110 | 45.15% |
| Libertarian | Ray E. Dittmar | 110,511 | 2.92% |
| Write-in | | 971 | 0.03% |
| Total votes | | 3,783,306 | 100.00% |
| Democratic hold | | | |
