= 1986 Texas Attorney General election =

- November 4, 1986
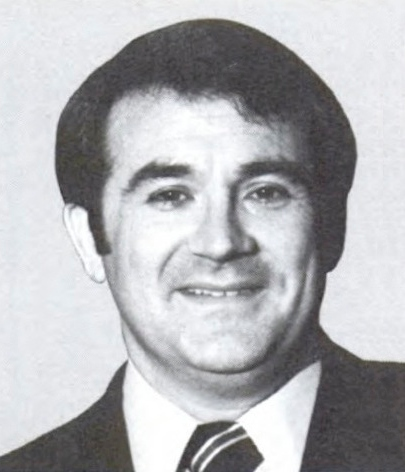

Nominee	Jim Mattox	Roy R. Barrera Jr.
Party	Democratic	Republican
Popular vote	1,735,820	1,588,464
Percentage	51.58%	47.20%
- County results Mattox: 40–50% 50–60% 60–70% 70–80% 80–90% >90% Barrera: 40–50% 50–60% 60–70% 70–80%
Attorney General before election
Jim Mattox
Democratic
Elected Attorney General
Jim Mattox
Democratic

The 1986 Texas Attorney General election took place on November 4, 1986, to elect the Texas Attorney General.

Incumbent Democratic Attorney General Jim Mattox won re-election to a second term, beating Republican nominee Roy R. Barrera Jr.

== Democratic primary ==
=== Candidates ===
==== Nominee ====
- Jim Mattox, incumbent Attorney General.

=== Results ===
May 3, 1986 Democratic primary
Party	Candidate	Votes	%
Democratic	Jim Mattox (incumbent)	858,315	100.00%
Total votes		858,315	100.00%

== Republican primary ==
=== Candidates ===
==== Nominee ====
- Roy R. Barrera Jr., state district judge from San Antonio.

==== Elimenated in primary ====
- Ed Walsh, former district attorney of Williamson County.
- John Roach, state district judge from Plano.

=== Results ===
May 3, 1986 Republican primary
Party	Candidate	Votes	%
Republican	Roy R. Barrera Jr.	210,611	46.10%
Republican	Ed Walsh	158,401	34.67%
Republican	John Roach	87,880	19.23%
Total votes		456,892	100.00%

June 7, 1986 Republican primary runoff
Party	Candidate	Votes	%
Republican	Roy R. Barrera Jr.	102,847	68.57%
Republican	Ed Walsh	47,138	31.43%
Total votes		149,985	100.00%

== General election ==
=== Results ===
November 4, 1986 Texas Attorney General election
Party	Candidate	Votes	%
Democratic	Jim Mattox (incumbent)	1,735,820	51.58%
Republican	Roy R. Barrera Jr.	1,588,464	47.20%
Libertarian	Mike Stephens	41,229	1.22%
Total votes		3,365,513	100.00%
Democratic hold			
