= 2002 Texas gubernatorial election =

- November 5, 2002
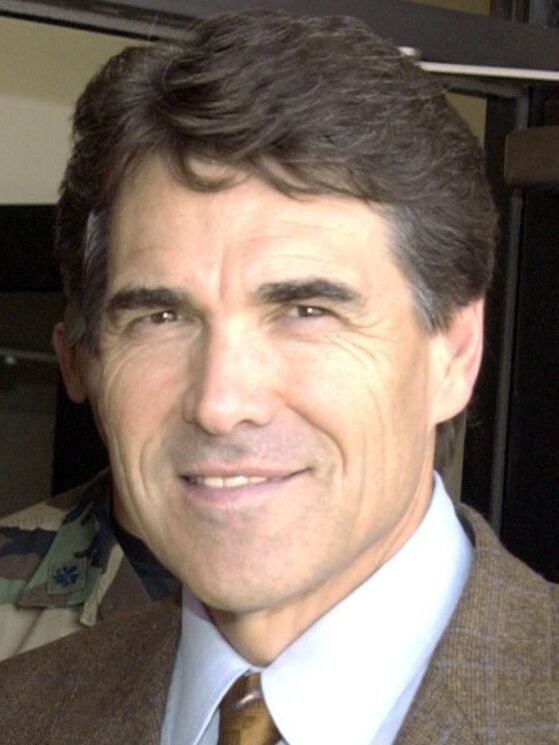

| Nominee | Rick Perry | Tony Sanchez |
| Party | Republican | Democratic |
| Popular vote | 2,632,591 | 1,819,798 |
| Percentage | 57.81% | 39.96% |
- County results Perry: 50–60% 60–70% 70–80% 80–90% Sanchez: 40–50% 50–60% 60–70% 70–80% 80–90%
Governor before election
Rick Perry
Republican
Elected Governor
Rick Perry
Republican

The 2002 Texas gubernatorial election was held on November 5, 2002, to elect the governor of Texas. Incumbent Republican governor Rick Perry, who had ascended to the governorship after the resignation of George W. Bush to become president of the United States, was elected to his first full term in office, winning 58% of the vote to Democrat Tony Sanchez's 40%.

Perry carried 218 out of 254 counties, while Sanchez only carried 36. Exit polls showed Perry easily won among white voters with 72%, while Sanchez won the African American vote with 85%, and the Latino vote with 65%. His second inauguration for a first full four-year term began on January 21, 2003, on the Texas State Capitol South Grounds.

As of 2026, this was the last time the Republican candidate carried Dallas County, the last time the Democratic candidate carried Cass, Hudspeth, Pecos, Terrell, and Kenedy counties, and the last time Republicans kept the vote margins within the single digits in Travis County.

== Primaries ==
=== Republican ===
Republican primary results
| Party | Candidate | Votes | % |
|---|---|---|---|
| Republican | Rick Perry (incumbent) | 620,463 | 100.00% |
| Total votes | | 620,463 | 100.00% |

=== Democratic ===
Democratic primary results
| Party | Candidate | Votes | % |
|---|---|---|---|
| Democratic | Tony Sanchez | 609,383 | 60.73% |
| Democratic | Dan Morales | 330,873 | 32.98% |
| Democratic | Bill Lyon | 43,011 | 4.29% |
| Democratic | John Worldpeace | 20,121 | 2.00% |
| Total votes | | 1,003,388 | 100.00% |

== Campaign ==
=== Perry ===
Incumbent Rick Perry ascended to the governorship of Texas on December 21, 2000, following the resignation of then-Gov. George W. Bush, who had been elected president of the United States. Perry had been elected Lieutenant Governor of Texas in 1998 and previously elected Texas commissioner of agriculture in 1990 and 1994, including three terms in the Texas House of Representatives in 1984, 1986 and 1988. He successfully ran for a full four-year term in 2002.

Perry had an ongoing political feud with Democratic Speaker Pete Laney during the 2001 legislative session, and vetoed several pieces of legislation brought forward by Democratic state lawmakers. Rumors about fellow Republican U.S. Senator Kay Bailey Hutchison launching a primary challenge against Perry had been swirling for weeks, but Hutchison chose not to run for governor, choosing instead to serve as vice chair of the Senate Republican Conference to avoid a nasty primary battle that would have divided the Texas Republican Party in time for the general election of 2002. Perry's campaign received the endorsement of former State Attorney General Dan Morales, who lost the Democratic primary nomination, and he also received endorsements from the Dallas Morning News, Abilene Reporter-News, Midland Reporter-Telegram, Lubbock Avalanche-Journal, and Galveston County Daily News. Public opinion polls from Zogby International, Survey USA, and Scripps-Howard showed Perry leading by double digits, and the Perry campaign was outspent by Sanchez by a margin of 12-to-1, with Perry spending $27 million to Sanchez's $76 million.

=== Sanchez ===
Laredo multimillionaire businessman Tony Sanchez had served as a regent of the University of Texas at Austin, having been appointed to the University of Texas Board of Regents by then-Governor Bush in 1997, and he also served on the Texas Parks and Wildlife Commission from 1985 to 1991, having been appointed by then-Governor Mark Wells White in 1985.

Sanchez was best known for getting involved in successful battles such as challenging the architectural plan for a new art museum and to consider a Hispanic candidate for president of the University of Texas Health Science Center at San Antonio. Sanchez started moving toward running for governor in late 2000, when he was helped by Kelly Fero, who served as a consultant on Jim Mattox's unsuccessful campaign for governor in 1990 and John Sharp's 1998 unsuccessful bid for lieutenant governor, and also had discussions with George Shipley, a longtime Democratic strategist and consultant. Sanchez easily defeated Morales by a landslide margin of 60 percent to 32 percent in the Democratic primary elections on March 12, 2002. However, the bitter primary campaign between Sanchez and Morales resulted in negative campaign attacks, including Morales criticizing Sanchez for connections between a failed Sanchez-owned savings and loan and Mexican drug lords. Sanchez pummeled Morales by picking up the questions on the tobacco settlement and suggested the former Texas attorney general was only running for office to protect himself from federal indictments. Sanchez managed to get endorsements from the Austin Chronicle, Corpus Christi Caller Times, and Waco Tribune Herald during the general election campaign.

=== Predictions ===
| Source | Ranking | As of |
|---|---|---|
| The Cook Political Report | Lean R | October 31, 2002 |
| Sabato's Crystal Ball | Likely R | November 4, 2002 |

=== Polling ===
| Poll source | Date(s) administered | Sample size (Note: Key: A – all adults RV – registered voters LV – likely voters V – unclear) | Margin of error | Rick Perry (R) | Tony Sanchez (D) | Other / Undecided |
|---|---|---|---|---|---|---|
| SurveyUSA | October 29–31, 2002 | 683 (LV) | ± 3.9% | 53% | 43% | 4% |

== Results ==
General election results
| Party | Candidate | Votes | % |
|---|---|---|---|
| Republican | Rick Perry (incumbent) | 2,632,591 | 57.81% |
| Democratic | Tony Sanchez | 1,819,798 | 39.96% |
| Libertarian | Jeff Daiell | 66,720 | 1.47% |
| Green | Rahul Mahajan | 32,187 | 0.71% |
| Independent | Elaine Eure Henderson (write-in) | 1,715 | 0.04% |
| Independent | Earl W. O'Neil (write-in) | 976 | 0.02% |
| Total votes | | 4,553,987 | 100.00% |

=== Counties that flipped from Republican to Democratic ===
- Cass (largest city: Atlanta)
- Hudspeth (largest city: Fort Hancock)
- Pecos (largest city: Fort Stockton)
- Terrell (largest city: Sanderson)
- Cameron (largest city: Brownsville)
- Kenedy (largest municipality: Sarita)
- Culberson (largest municipality: Van Horn)
- Kleberg (largest municipality: Kingsville)
- Marion (largest city: Jefferson)
- Morris (largest city: Daingerfield)
- Newton (largest city: Newton)
- Bee (largest city: Beeville)
- Fisher (largest city: Rotan)
- Jefferson (largest city: Beaumont)
- Frio (largest municipality: Pearsall)
- El Paso (largest municipality: El Paso)
- Val Verde (largest municipality: Del Rio)
- Nueces (largest city: Corpus Christi)
- Travis (largest city: Austin)
- Robertson (largest city: Hearne)
- Willacy (largest city: Raymondville)
- Hidalgo (largest city: McAllen)
