= John Cornyn =

American politician (born 1952)

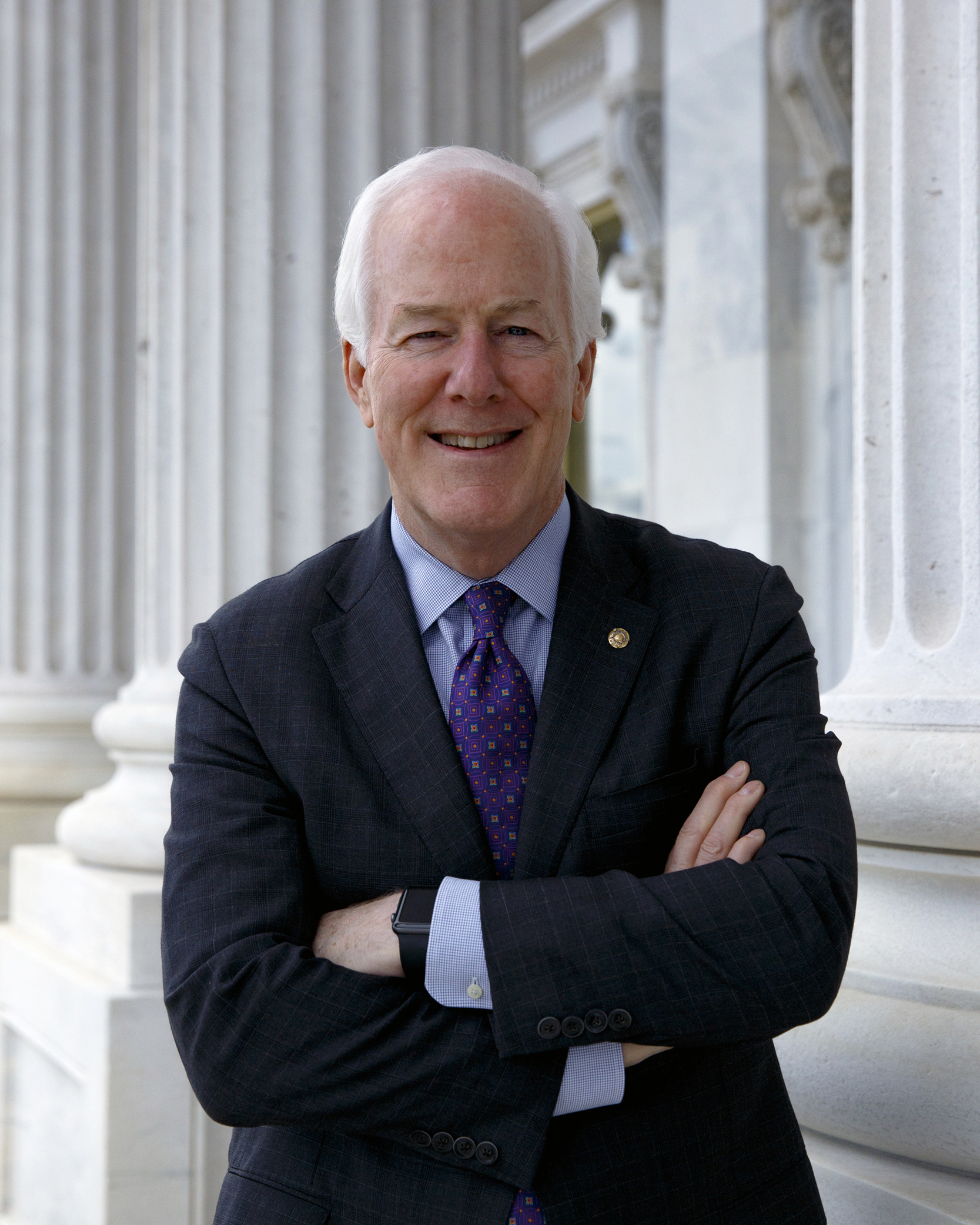
- Official portrait, 2017

United States Senator from Texas
- Incumbent
- Assumed office December 2, 2002 Serving with Ted Cruz
- Preceded by: Phil Gramm
- Succeeded by: James Talarico (elect)
Senate positions
Chair of the Senate Narcotics Caucus
Incumbent
Assumed office January 3, 2025
Preceded by	Sheldon Whitehouse
In office January 3, 2019 – January 20, 2021
Preceded by	Chuck Grassley
Succeeded by	Sheldon Whitehouse
Ranking Member of the Senate Narcotics Caucus
In office January 20, 2021 – January 3, 2023
Preceded by	Dianne Feinstein
Succeeded by	Chuck Grassley
Senate Majority Whip
In office January 3, 2015 – January 3, 2019
Leader	Mitch McConnell
Preceded by	Dick Durbin
Succeeded by	John Thune
Senate Minority Whip
In office January 3, 2013 – January 3, 2015
Leader	Mitch McConnell
Preceded by	Jon Kyl
Succeeded by	Dick Durbin
Chair of the National Republican Senatorial Committee
In office January 3, 2009 – January 3, 2013
Preceded by	John Ensign
Succeeded by	Jerry Moran

49th Attorney General of Texas
- In office January 13, 1999 – December 1, 2002
- Governor: George W. Bush; Rick Perry
- Preceded by: Dan Morales
- Succeeded by: Greg Abbott

Justice of the Texas Supreme Court
- In office January 2, 1991 – October 18, 1997
- Preceded by: Franklin Spears
- Succeeded by: Deborah Hankinson

Judge of the Texas 37th Judicial District Court
- In office January 1, 1985 – January 1, 1991
- Preceded by: Richard Woods
- Succeeded by: Ann-Marie Aaron

Personal details
- Born: John Cornyn III; February 2, 1952 (age 74) Houston, Texas, U.S.
- Party: Republican
- Spouse: Sandy Hansen (m. 1979)
- Children: 2
- Education: Trinity University (BA); St. Mary's University (JD); University of Virginia (LLM)
- Website: Senate website
- Cornyn's voice Cornyn on George Floyd and the naming of Juneteenth as a national holiday. Recorded June 16, 2021.

John Cornyn III (/ˈkɔːrnɪn/ KOR-nin; born February 2, 1952) is an American politician and former judge who is the senior United States senator for Texas, a seat he has held since 2002. He is a member of the Republican Party.

Born in Houston, Cornyn is a graduate of Trinity University, St. Mary's University School of Law, and the University of Virginia School of Law. He was a judge on Texas's 37th District Court from 1985 to 1991, an associate justice of the Texas Supreme Court from 1991 to 1997, and Attorney General of Texas from 1999 to 2002. He was first elected to the U.S. Senate in 2002. During his tenure, Cornyn chaired the National Republican Senatorial Committee from 2009 to 2013 and served as the Senate Republican whip from 2013 to 2019.

Cornyn has been described as an establishment Republican. Although considered conservative by voting record, he has a reputation for bipartisan negotiation on gun legislation and immigration reform. In 2022, he helped negotiate passage of the Bipartisan Safer Communities Act, for which he was rebuked by the Republican Party of Texas.

Cornyn ran for reelection in 2026. After narrowly coming in first place but not receiving more than 50% of the vote in the Republican primary, he faced Texas Attorney General Ken Paxton in a runoff election. Cornyn lost renomination in the May runoff, receiving about 37% of the vote. Cornyn is the first incumbent Texas senator to lose renomination since Ralph Yarborough in 1970. Democratic nominee James Talarico defeated Paxton in the general election.

== Early life, education, and legal career ==
Cornyn was born in Houston, the second child of Atholene Gale Cornyn (née Danley) and John Cornyn II, a colonel in the U.S. Air Force. He attended the American School in Japan after his family moved to Tokyo in 1968, and graduated from it in 1969. In 1973, he graduated from Trinity University, where he majored in journalism and was a member of Chi Delta Tau. Cornyn earned a Juris Doctor from St. Mary's University School of Law in 1977 and an LL.M. from the University of Virginia School of Law in 1995.

Cornyn served as a district judge in San Antonio for six years before being elected as a Republican in 1990 to the Texas Supreme Court, on which he served for seven years.

== Texas attorney general (1999–2002) ==
=== 1998 election ===
In 1998, Cornyn ran for Texas attorney general. In the March Republican primary, Railroad Commissioner Barry Williamson received 38% of the vote, and Cornyn, a former Texas Supreme Court justice, received 32%. In the April runoff election, Cornyn defeated Williamson, 58% to 42%. Cornyn won the general election with 54% of the vote; he defeated Jim Mattox, a former Texas attorney general (1983–1991) and U.S. representative.

=== Tenure ===
In September 2000, Cornyn created the Texas Internet Bureau to investigate illegal internet practices. The Internet Bureau was funded through an $800,000 grant from Governor Bush’s office, and its mission was to "help fight cybercrime in Texas, including consumer fraud, hacker break-ins, and online child exploitation". Cornyn investigated fraudulent Medicare and Medicaid claims.

Cornyn was criticized by civil rights groups for failing to investigate in a timely manner the false drug convictions of numerous African Americans in Tulia, Texas. On September 6, 2002, The Austin Chronicle reported that Cornyn had announced that his office would investigate the 1999 drug bust, where the testimony of one narcotics agent led to the arrests of 46 people, 43 of whom were Black.

== U.S. Senate (2002–2027) ==
=== Elections ===
==== 2002 ====
In the 2002 Republican primary, Cornyn faced five opponents. Cornyn defeated his closest Republican challenger, the self-financed, Dallas-based international physician Bruce Rusty Lang, by a ten-to-one margin. In the general election, Cornyn defeated Democratic nominee Ron Kirk in a campaign that cost each candidate over $9 million.

==== 2008 ====
Cornyn defeated Christian activist Larry Kilgore in the Republican primary. Texas Representative Rick Noriega won the March 4 Democratic primary against Gene Kelly, Ray McMurrey, and Rhett Smith. Cornyn was reelected.

==== 2014 ====
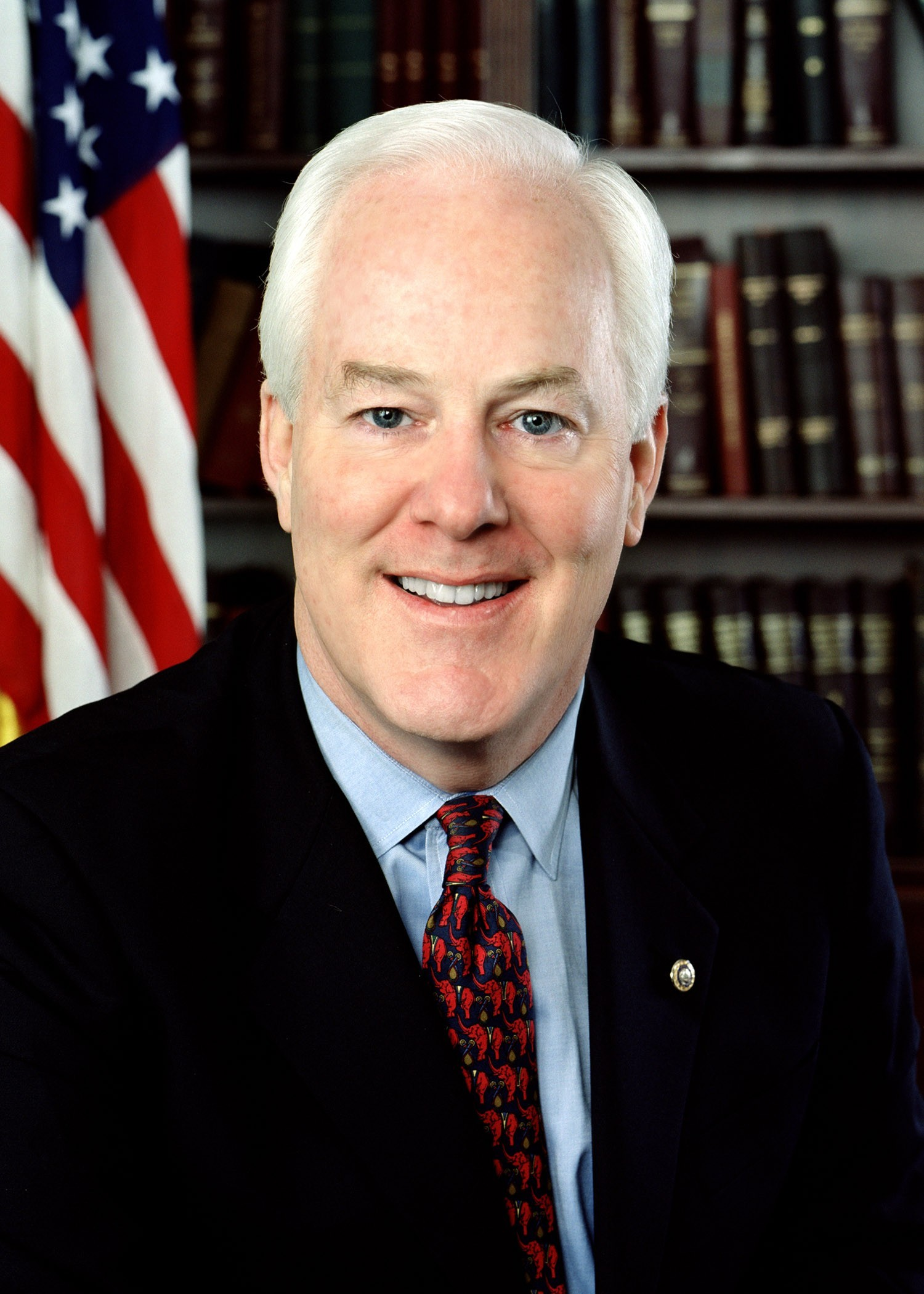
Cornyn during the 108th Congress

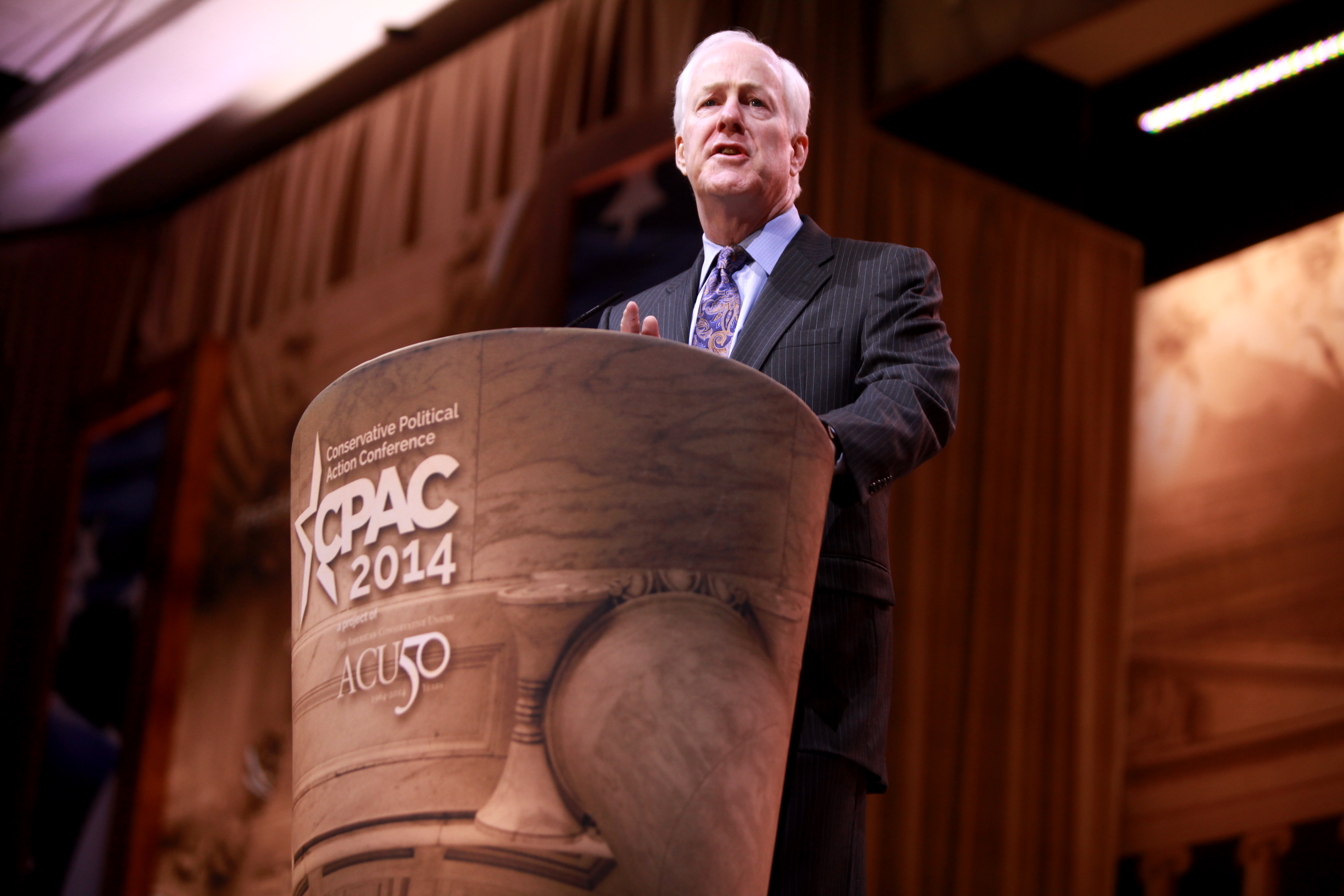
John Cornyn speaking at the 2014 Conservative Political Action Conference (CPAC) in National Harbor, Maryland

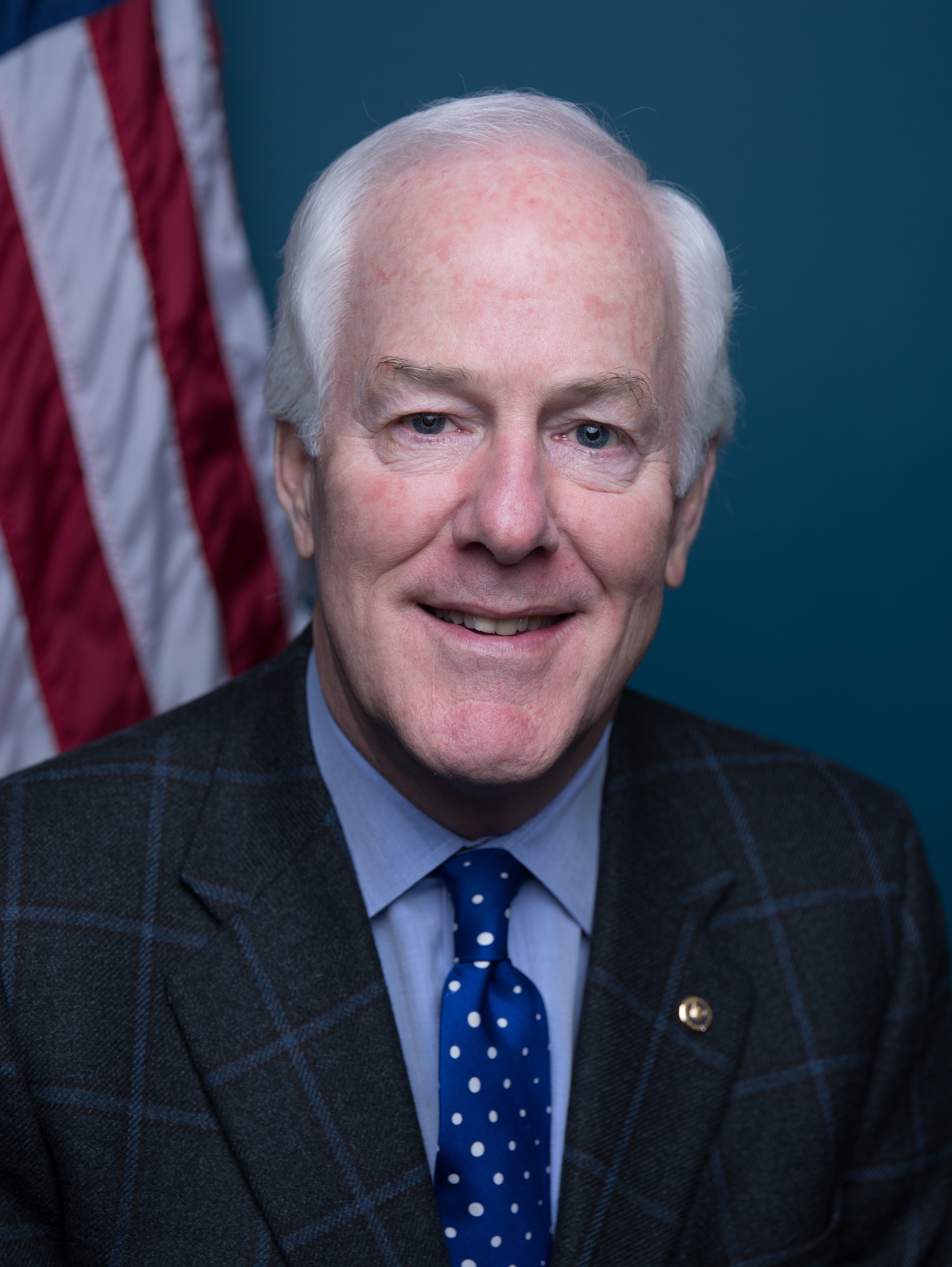
Cornyn during the 115th Congress

Cornyn was reelected in 2014. He won the March Republican primary with 59% of the vote against Houston-area congressman Steve Stockman. In the general election, he raised $14 million, outspending Democratic nominee David Alameel by nearly 3–1. Cornyn won again by over 20 points.

==== 2020 ====
Cornyn was reelected to a fourth term in 2020 in the closest of his Senate campaigns. He won the primary with 76% of the vote, and then defeated Democrat MJ Hegar in a race that the Cook Political Report had initially rated "Likely Republican" but then shifted to "Lean Republican".

==== 2026 ====
2026 Republican primary runoff results by county Paxton: 50–60%; 60–70%; 70–80% 80–90%; Cornyn: 50–60%; 70–80%; Tie

Cornyn ran for a fifth Senate term in 2026. He faced Texas Attorney General Ken Paxton and Representative Wesley Hunt in the March 3 primary. No one received 50% of the vote, which triggered a runoff election between Cornyn and Paxton on May 26.

Cornyn lost to Paxton by 28 points, becoming the second incumbent senator to lose renomination in the 2026 elections cycle, after Bill Cassidy. According to Decision Desk HQ, it was the worst primary performance for an incumbent senator in a head-to-head race since J. William Fulbright in 1974.

=== Tenure ===
During George W. Bush's presidency, The Dallas Morning News considered Cornyn a reliable Bush ally on most issues.

In 2004, Cornyn and Senator Hillary Clinton co-founded the U.S. Senate India Caucus, of which he became the co-chair. In December 2006, he was selected by his colleagues to join the five-person Republican Senate leadership team as Vice Chairman of the Senate Republican Conference.

In 2005, Cornyn gained notice by connecting the Supreme Court's reluctance to hear arguments for sustaining Terri Schiavo's life with the recent murders of Judge Joan Lefkow's husband and mother, as well as the courtroom murder of Judge Rowland Barnes. Cornyn said: "I don't know if there is a cause-and-effect connection, but we have seen some recent episodes of courthouse violence in this country. I wonder whether there may be some connection between the perception in some quarters on some occasions, where judges are making political decisions, yet are unaccountable to the public, that it builds up and builds up, and building up to the point where some people engage in violence." His statement and a similar one by House Majority Leader Tom DeLay were widely denounced, including by The New York Times. Cornyn later said that the statement was taken out of context, and for that reason, he regretted the statement. Cornyn was mentioned as a possible replacement for Supreme Court Justices Sandra Day O'Connor and William Rehnquist.

On May 18, 2007, Cornyn was involved in a verbal altercation with Senator John McCain. During a meeting on immigration, McCain and Cornyn had a shouting match when Cornyn started questioning the number of judicial appeals that illegal immigrants could receive. McCain responded by yelling profanity and insults at Cornyn and said, "I know more about this than anyone else in the room." Previously, Cornyn had told McCain: "Wait a second here. I've been sitting in here for all of these negotiations, and you just parachute in here on the last day. You're out of line."

As chairman of the National Republican Senatorial Committee, Cornyn was a strong supporter of Norm Coleman's various court challenges to the certification of the 2008 Minnesota U.S. Senate race. Cornyn advocated for Coleman to bring the case before the federal court and said the trial and appeals could take years to complete. Cornyn threatened that Republicans would wage a "World War III" if Senate Democrats had attempted to seat Democratic candidate Al Franken before the appeals were complete. Coleman conceded after the Minnesota Supreme Court unanimously ruled that Franken had won the election.

Cornyn voted to confirm Samuel Alito as an Associate Justice of the Supreme Court and John Roberts as Chief Justice. In September 2005, during Roberts's Supreme Court hearings, Cornyn's staff passed out bingo cards to reporters. He asked them to stamp their card every time a Democrat on the Judiciary Committee used terms such as "far right" or "extremist". On July 24, 2009, Cornyn announced his intention to vote against President Obama's Supreme Court nominee Sonia Sotomayor, saying that she might rule "from a liberal, activist perspective".

In 2013, National Journal ranked Cornyn the 14th-most conservative senator.

On the day of Obama's inauguration, it was reported that Cornyn would prevent Hillary Clinton from being confirmed as secretary of state by unanimous floor vote that day. Senate Majority Leader Harry Reid's spokesman reported to the Associated Press that a roll call vote for the Clinton confirmation would be held instead on the following day, January 21, 2009, and that it was expected Clinton would "receive overwhelming bipartisan support". The vote was 94–2 in her favor, with only Senators Jim DeMint and David Vitter voting in opposition.

On March 18, 2020, Cornyn blamed the COVID-19 pandemic on cultural practices in China and mistakenly blamed China for the MERS and swine flu epidemics. His comments were criticized by some Democrats and the National Council of Asian Americans and Pacific Islanders. At the time, the consensus among researchers was that coronavirus had originated at a wet market in Wuhan, China.

=== Senate Majority Whip ===
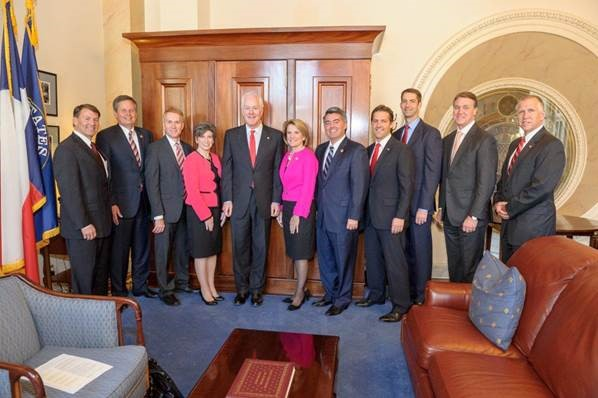
Cornyn with senate republican freshmen December 2014

On November 14, 2012, Cornyn was elected Senate Minority Whip by his peers.

Cornyn was named Senate Majority Whip after the 2014 election, in which Republicans gained a Senate majority.

After the death of Associate Supreme Court Justice Antonin Scalia in February 2016, Cornyn said that anyone Obama nominated to replace him would have a difficult confirmation process and feel like a piñata. He also said that no serious candidate would accept a nomination knowing that they would not be confirmed. When Obama nominated Merrick Garland to replace Scalia, Cornyn said that even if the president has the constitutional authority to nominate someone, the Senate has full authority on how to proceed. Cornyn also said that the voice of the people should play a role, and that the "only way to empower the American people" was having the vacancy be filled by the winner of the upcoming presidential election, so no hearings on Garland should be held. The Senate did not vote on Garland's nomination, which expired after the November election of President Donald Trump. Trump nominated Neil Gorsuch to the seat, and Gorsuch was confirmed. In September 2020, Cornyn supported a vote on Trump's nominee to fill the Supreme Court vacancy caused by the death of Justice Ruth Bader Ginsburg. In March 2016, he took the position that the Senate should not consider Obama's Supreme Court nominee.

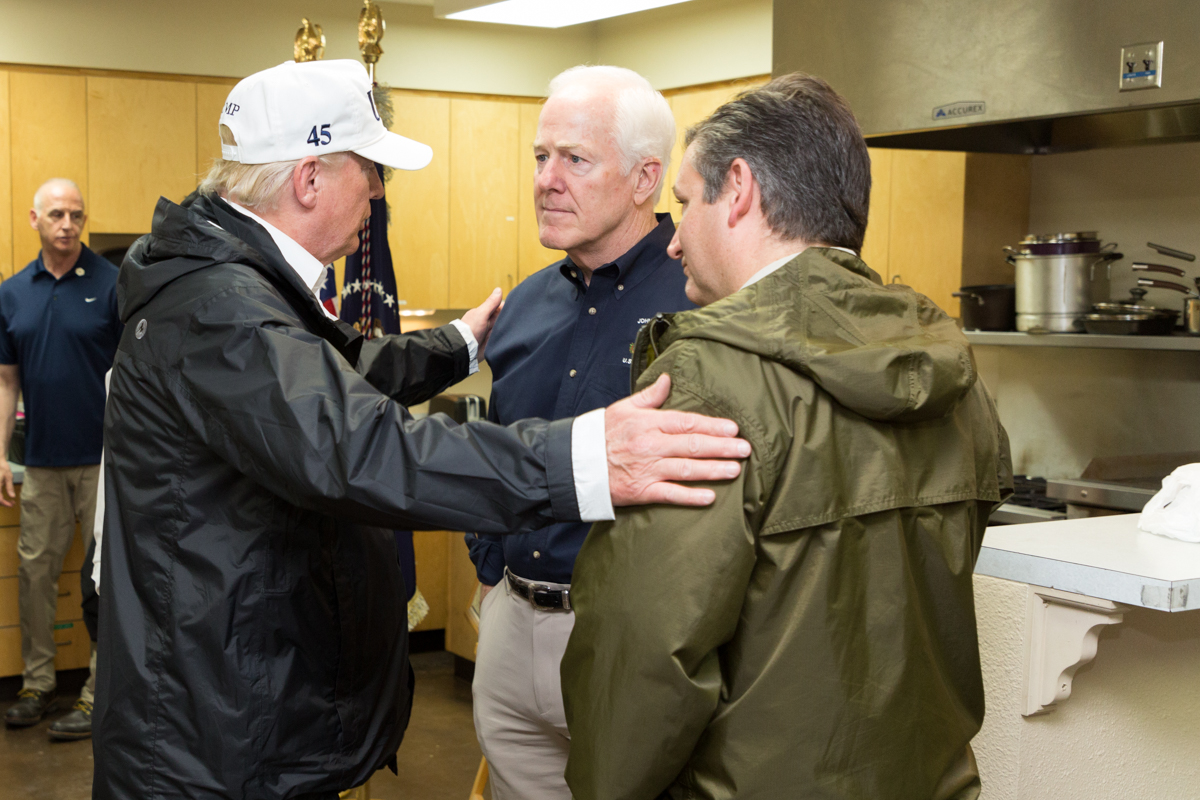
Trump with senators Cornyn and Ted Cruz, August 29, 2017

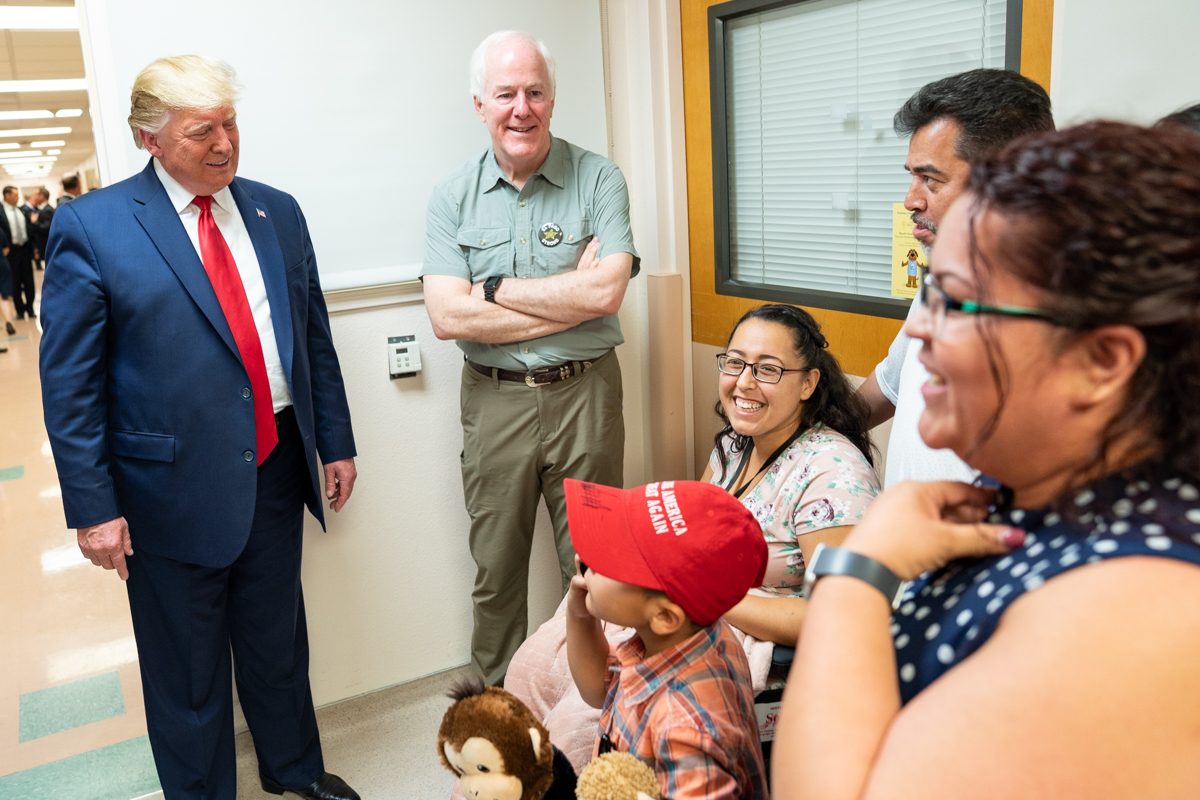
Cornyn and Trump in El Paso, Texas, on August 7, 2019

On June 8, 2017, during a committee hearing whose announced topic was the Russian interference in the 2016 election and Comey's dismissal as FBI director, Cornyn opted instead to spend his time questioning James Comey on Hillary Clinton's email controversy.

In September 2018, during the Supreme Court nomination hearings for Brett Kavanaugh, Cornyn accused the Democrats on the Judiciary Committee of devolving into mob rule by breaking the rules of decorum when asking for postponement or adjournment of the hearing to obtain or review documents from Kavanaugh's time working for the George W. Bush administration. Cornyn said that it was hard to believe the Democrats' claim that they could not properly assess Kavanaugh without the documents because it seemed that their minds were already made up.

=== 2024 Senate Majority Leader election ===
In February 2024, Cornyn announced he would run for Republican leader after Mitch McConnell announced he would step down from his position at the end of the year.

Following the 2024 U.S. elections, in which the Republicans carried the Senate, Cornyn was one of three announced candidates vying to be the next Senate Majority Leader. The others were Rick Scott and John Thune.

On November 12, 2024, Senator Mike Lee hosted a candidates forum, and the election took place the next day. It was held in a closed-door Republican caucus setting, and senators' votes were not publicized. Cornyn lost to Thune on the second ballot, 24–29.

=== Committee assignments ===
- United States Senate Select Committee on Intelligence
- Committee on Finance
  - Subcommittee on Energy, Natural Resources, and Infrastructure
  - Subcommittee on International Trade, Customs, and Global Competitiveness
  - Subcommittee on Taxation and IRS Oversight
- Committee on the Judiciary
  - Subcommittee on the Constitution
  - Subcommittee on Criminal Justice and Counterterrorism
  - Subcommittee on Immigration, Refugees and Border Security (ranking member)
  - Subcommittee on Intellectual Property
  - Subcommittee on Privacy, Technology and the Law
- Caucus on International Narcotics Control

=== Caucus memberships ===
- Senate India Caucus (co-founder)
- Senate Taiwan Caucus

== Political positions ==
In 2023, the Lugar Center ranked Cornyn fifth among senators for bipartisanship. He has been described as a traditional establishment Republican.

=== Abortion ===
Cornyn opposes abortion.

In 2007, he voted against a bill that would expand federal funding for stem cell research that used human embryonic stem cells. Instead, Cornyn pushed for "several alternatives that would use adult and cord blood stem cells for research [as those] methods have proven to be more productive, and they do not harm or destroy human embryos." As an alternative, he supported the Alternative Pluripotent Stem Cell Therapies Enhancement Act to aid research into techniques of deriving pluripotent stem cells without harming or destroying human embryos.

In 2019, when asked about an Alabama law that prohibited abortions, including in cases of rape or incest, Cornyn said it was an "Alabama state issue".

=== Animal welfare ===
Cornyn co-introduced the Ending Agricultural Trade Suppression (EATS) Act, which would limit states' ability to regulate the sale of meat from animals raised on farms that do not meet animal welfare standards. In a statement, he said, "states like California shouldn't be able to tell ranchers in Texas how to do their jobs." The bill's critics allege that it jeopardizes farm animal welfare.

=== Civil rights and law enforcement ===
In the 2004 debate surrounding the Federal Marriage Amendment, Cornyn released an advance copy of a speech he was to give at The Heritage Foundation. In the speech, he wrote, "It does not affect your daily life very much if your neighbor marries an animal. But that does not mean it is right ... Now you must raise your children up in a world where that union of man and animal is on the same legal footing as man and wife." According to his office, he removed the reference to the animal in the actual speech, but The Washington Post ran the quote, as did The Daily Show.

Cornyn sponsored a bill to allow law enforcement to force anyone arrested or detained by federal authorities to provide samples of their DNA, which would be recorded in a central database.

In a February 24, 2019, tweet, Cornyn mocked dictatorship, centralized power and democratic socialism by quoting Italian fascist leader Benito Mussolini as saying "We were the first to assert that the more complicated the forms assumed by civilization, the more restricted the freedom of the individual must become."

On June 25, 2022, after former President Barack Obama condemned the U.S. Supreme Court decision Dobbs v. Jackson Women's Health Organization, which overturned Roe v. Wade and Planned Parenthood v. Casey, in part because of its standing as "50 years of precedent", Cornyn tweeted, "Now do Plessy vs Ferguson/Brown vs Board of Education". Representative Joaquin Castro, who interpreted the tweet as advocating the return of segregation in schools, called it racist. Cornyn continued in another tweet, "Thank goodness some SCOTUS precedents are overruled"; Brown had overturned more than 50 years of precedent regarding the doctrine of "separate but equal" as defined by Plessy.

=== President Donald Trump ===
In 2016, Cornyn raised concerns about Trump's presidential bid, calling Trump an "albatross around the down-ballot races" who would "divide the party".

Cornyn frequently praised Trump during most of his first presidential term, but in the weeks before the 2020 election, amid a tightening race with Democratic nominee MJ Hegar, Cornyn began to distance himself from Trump. He said he praised Trump in public but expressed disagreement with him in private.

During Trump's presidency, Cornyn and fellow Texas Senator Ted Cruz contributed to the appointment of multiple conservative judges to federal courts with jurisdiction over Texas.

Cornyn repeatedly defended Trump's decision to siphon resources from the Pentagon to build a wall on the Mexico border. In March and September 2019, he voted to ratify the maneuver, opposing congressional attempts to block Trump's action. But in late October 2020, as Cornyn was trying to distance himself from Trump, he said he opposed Trump's maneuver and had never supported it.

Cornyn warned Trump about anticipated negative effects of restructuring tariffs on Mexican exports, saying, "We're holding a gun to our own heads by doing this." In January 2018, he was one of 36 Republican senators to sign a letter to Trump requesting that he preserve the North American Free Trade Agreement by modernizing it for the 21st-century economy. Cornyn urged Trump to restart trade talks on the Trans-Pacific Partnership, which Trump called "a disaster".

In June 2020, amid reports that Russia had paid the Taliban bounties to kill American soldiers and that Trump had been briefed on the subject months earlier, Cornyn defended an assertion by Trump that he had never been briefed on the subject. Cornyn said, "I think the president can't single-handedly remember everything, I'm sure, that he's briefed on."

On May 28, 2021, Cornyn voted against creating an independent commission to investigate the January 6 United States Capitol attack.

In May 2023, Cornyn said Republicans should nominate "a candidate who can actually win", arguing that Trump's "time has passed him by" and that Trump did not appeal to voters beyond his base.

On March 20, 2025, Cornyn posted a photo of himself on X appearing to read Trump's Art of the Deal with the caption "Recommended".

On May 11, 2026 (15 days before the Republican Senate primary runoff), Cornyn introduced legislation to designate U.S. Route 287 as a future Interstate 47 (I-47) in honor of Trump. On May 19, Trump endorsed Texas Attorney General Ken Paxton in the Republican Senate primary runoff against Cornyn.

=== Foreign policy and national security ===
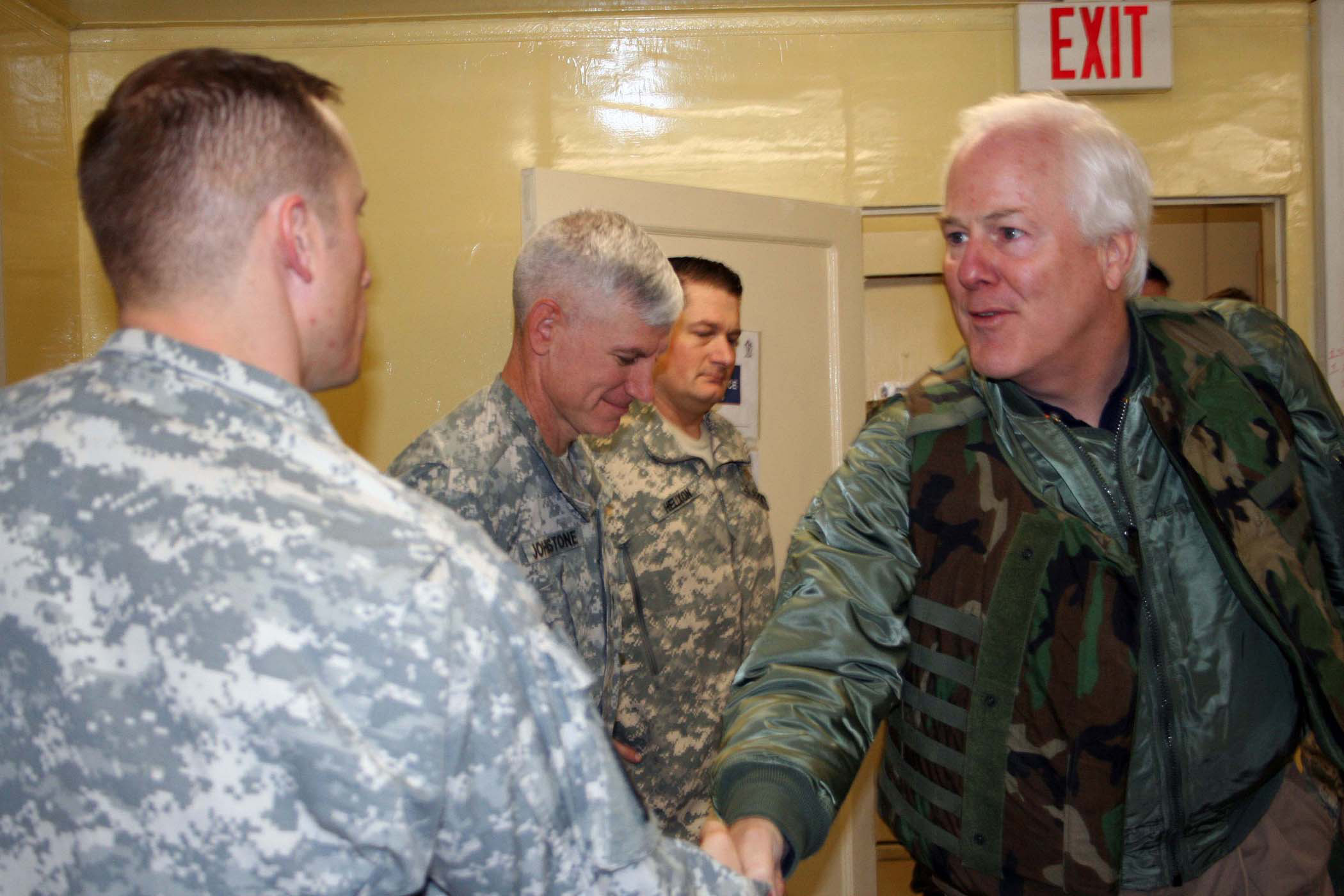
Cornyn greeting soldiers at FOB Fenty in Afghanistan, January 2008

Cornyn is hawkish in his foreign policy views.

In December 2010, Cornyn was one of 26 senators to vote against the ratification of New Start, a nuclear arms reduction treaty between the United States and Russia that obliges both countries to have no more than 1,550 strategic warheads and 700 launchers deployed during the next seven years, and provides a continuation of on-site inspections that halted when START I expired the previous year. It was the first arms treaty with Russia in eight years.

In 2013, Cornyn said that, despite the sequester, the Pentagon would actually see its budget increase.

In April 2018, Cornyn was one of eight Republican senators to sign a letter to Treasury Secretary Steven Mnuchin and acting Secretary of State John Sullivan expressing "deep concern" over a United Nations report exposing "North Korean sanctions evasion involving Russia and China" and asserting that the findings "demonstrate an elaborate and alarming military-venture between rogue, tyrannical states to avoid United States and international sanctions and inflict terror and death upon thousands of innocent people" while calling it "imperative that the United States provides a swift and appropriate response to the continued use of chemical weapons used by President Assad and his forces, and works to address the shortcomings in sanctions enforcement".

Cornyn supported U.S. involvement in the Saudi-led intervention in the Yemeni civil war. In December 2018 he said that the U.S. should stand with Saudi Arabia despite the assassination of Jamal Khashoggi, saying: "Saudi Arabia is fighting a proxy war against Iran in Yemen, and an overreaction, in my view, would mean that we cancel arms sales and simply abandon our ally."

As Senate Majority Whip, Cornyn filed a resolution welcoming Israeli Prime Minister Benjamin Netanyahu, who was to address a joint meeting of Congress in March 2015, a resolution co-sponsored only by Republicans. Vice President Biden and numerous Senate and House Democrats said they would not attend the address. Cornyn supported the Senate resolution expressing objection to UN Security Council Resolution 2334, which called Israeli settlement building in the occupied Palestinian territories a flagrant violation of international law.

Cornyn has been a vocal critic of China. In August 2018, Cornyn urged the Trump administration to impose sanctions under the Global Magnitsky Act against Chinese officials responsible for Xinjiang re-education camps against the Uyghur Muslim minority in western China's Xinjiang region. In a Washington Post opinion piece, Cornyn wrote that widespread adoption of Huawei technology could increase vulnerability to cyberattacks and endanger NATO troops engaged on 5G-equipped battlefields.

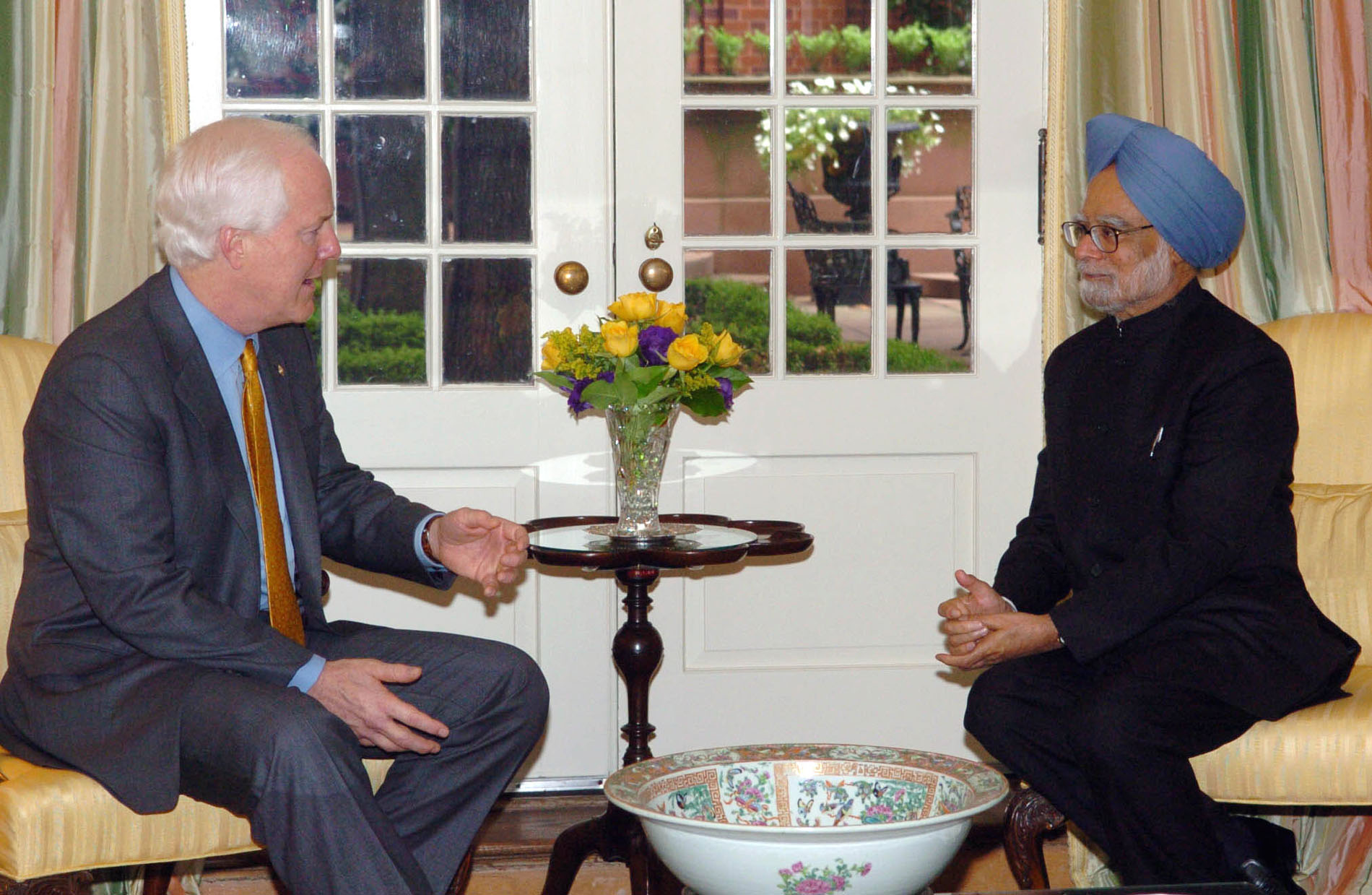
Cornyn with Indian Prime Minister Manmohan Singh in 2005

Cornyn heightened his anti-China advocacy during the COVID-19 pandemic and the U.S. withdrawal from Afghanistan. He has been widely accused of spreading the misinformation that MERS (Middle East respiratory syndrome, a disease first reported from the Arabian Peninsula) and the Swine Flu (an epidemic that first emerged in North America) originated from China, because allegedly "people eat bats and snakes and dogs and things like that." In addition to charges of racism, The Washington Post article has noted that "none of the diseases he mentioned are linked to dogs and snakes" and that rattlesnake-eating is not popular in China, but is in Cornyn's own Texas.

Upon the U.S. withdrawal from Afghanistan, Cornyn tweeted that the U.S. still has 30,000 troops in Taiwan (formally the Republic of China); in fact, the U.S. has kept no troops in Taiwan since it normalized relations with China. Cornyn has since deleted the inaccurate tweet and refused to respond to queries about it.

After Russia invaded Ukraine in 2022, Cornyn said Americans had a "responsibility to support the Ukrainian people as they fight to defend their own sovereignty". He advocated sending military aid, but also warned that Russian President Vladimir Putin's unpredictability could escalate the conflict. Cornyn introduced the Ukraine Democracy Defense Lend-Lease Act of 2022 and cosponsored bills that included statements of solidarity with Ukraine, continuing to supply resources to Ukrainian troops, and renewing the Lend-Lease Act after its expiration. His views brought him into conflict with Texas Attorney General Ken Paxton, who criticized him in 2024 for voting for a $95 billion foreign aid package; after Paxton called him an "America Last RINO", Cornyn responded that Paxton should focus on his legal proceedings and "spend less time pushing Russian propaganda".

=== Economy ===
Cornyn voted to permanently repeal the estate tax and raise the estate tax exemption to $5 million. He voted in favor of $350 billion in tax cuts over 11 years and supported making the Bush tax cuts permanent. He opposed extending the 2011 payroll tax holiday. He voted for the Emergency Economic Stabilization Act of 2008 but against the American Recovery and Reinvestment Act of 2009.

In 2008, Cornyn voted for the Troubled Asset Relief Program (TARP), also known as the Wall Street bailout, and later voted to end the program.

=== Environment ===
Cornyn voted against a measure recognizing that humans are causing climate change. He was one of 22 senators to sign a letter to Trump urging him to withdraw the United States from the Paris Agreement. In May 2019, Cornyn said it was important that the United States take measures to combat climate change, but condemned the Green New Deal as proposed by Alexandria Ocasio-Cortez. In April 2020, he stated that climate scientists' models of the effects of climate change do not use the "scientific method".

In 2005, Cornyn voted against including oil and gas smokestacks in mercury regulations. He voted against factoring global warming into federal project planning, and against banning drilling in the Arctic National Wildlife Refuge. He also voted against removing oil and gas exploration subsidies. During his tenure in the Senate, Cornyn has scored 0% on the League of Conservation Voters' environmental scorecard, a system of ranking politicians according to their voting record on environmental legislation.

=== Guns ===
In January 2014, Cornyn introduced the "Constitutional Concealed Carry Reciprocity Act". The bill would provide interstate reciprocity for persons with concealed weapons permits. Cornyn described the bill: "It's like a driver's license. It doesn't trump state laws. Say you have a carry permit in Texas; then you use it in another state that has a concealed-carry law." He received an "A" grade from the NRA Political Victory Fund in 2003 and an "A+" grade in 2014 and 2022. Cornyn continued to support Concealed Carry Reciprocity as of 2018, with the Republican-held House of Representatives passing a bill in late 2017 with this language attached to gun control measures from the Senate's Fix NICS Act of 2017 bill.

In 2017, Cornyn helped Democrats pass legislation designed to aid federal agencies in alerting, reporting, and recording gun purchases by creating a universal cross-agency database.

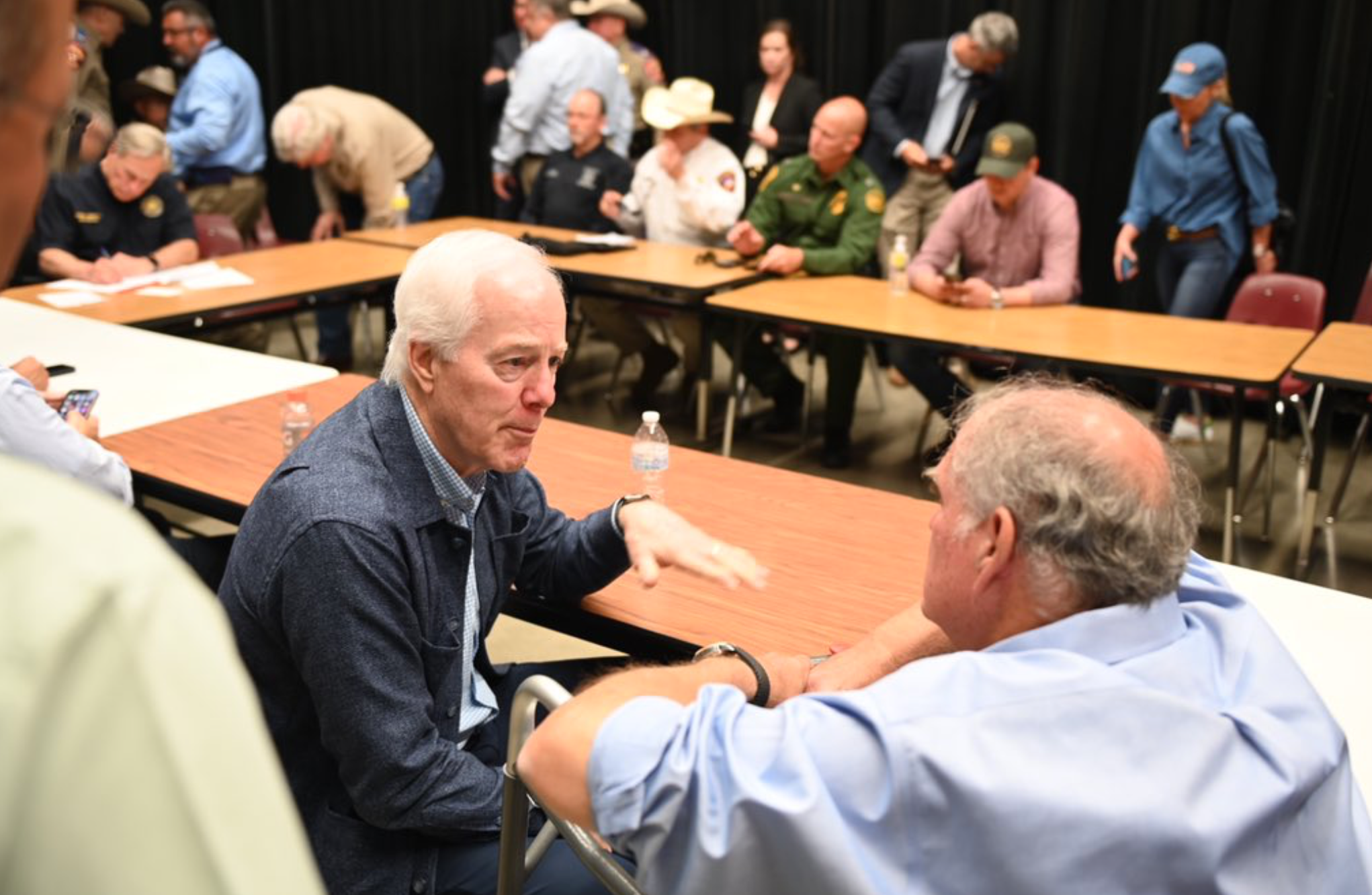
Cornyn (left) speaking with Uvalde Mayor Don McLaughlin on May 25, 2022, following the Robb Elementary School shooting

In 2022, in the wake of the Robb Elementary School shooting, Cornyn opposed further background check laws and those limiting the types of weapons that adults may purchase. He later became one of ten Republican senators to support a bipartisan agreement on gun control, which included a red flag law, support for state crisis intervention orders, funding for school safety resources, stronger background checks for buyers under 21, and penalties for straw purchases.

=== Health care ===
Cornyn opposes the Affordable Care Act (also known as Obamacare). He voted against it in 2009, and played a leading role in the attempts to repeal the Affordable Care Act in 2017. He voted against the Health Care and Education Reconciliation Act of 2010. Cornyn said that Senator Ted Cruz's 2013 efforts to defund the Affordable Care Act by threatening to default on the U.S. government's debt obligations were "unachievable", adding, "the shutdown did not help our cause. What did help our cause was the president's implementation of the Affordable Care Act, which has overwhelmed everything else. I don't hear anyone thinking that another government shutdown is the way to achieve our goals." Cornyn joined other Republican leaders to block Cruz's procedural move to reject an increase in the debt ceiling.

=== Immigration ===
In February 2021, Cornyn supported a Texas business coalition advocating a federal DREAM Act solution for illegal immigrants brought to the U.S. as children, a group that includes roughly 700,000 Deferred Action for Childhood Arrivals recipients nationwide, including over 95,000 in Texas.

In July 2021, Cornyn supported legislation to expand and expedite the Special Immigrant Visa (SIV) program for Afghan interpreters and other allies who assisted U.S. forces, allowing thousands of eligible applicants and their families to immigrate to the U.S.

In December 2022, Cornyn pushed back on Republican rhetoric calling the border surge during the Biden administration an "invasion", instead calling it a "humanitarian, public safety and public health crisis".

In June 2026, after losing the runoff election, Cornyn said he would not support Trump's $70 billion immigration spending bill unless the Trump administration released more than $10 billion in border security spending that Congress had already approved.

=== LGBTQ rights ===
While serving on the Texas Supreme Court in the 1990s, Cornyn ruled with the majority to overturn a lower court ruling, State v. Morales, that had found Texas's anti-sodomy laws to be unconstitutional. During oral arguments, he questioned the merits of the case, asking how the anti-sodomy laws harmed gay people if the laws were not enforced. According to Yale Law School professor William Eskridge, Cornyn "engineered the Morales majority" that saved the sodomy law. When running for the Senate in 2002, Cornyn defended the law. In 2003, the U.S. Supreme Court overturned Texas's sodomy law in Lawrence v. Texas, ruling that anti-sodomy laws are unconstitutional.

After Lawrence v. Texas, Cornyn condemned the "startling display of judicial activism that so threatens our fundamental institutions and our values". He said he worried that the Supreme Court would next overturn the Defense of Marriage Act, which prohibited recognition of same-sex marriage at the federal level, and he played a leading role in trying to introduce a constitutional amendment to prohibit same-sex marriage. Cornyn argued that recognition of same-sex marriage harmed people in heterosexual marriages. He claimed that children raised by gay couples are "at higher risk of a host of social ills", such as crime, drug use and dropping out of school, and that same-sex marriage would put "more and more children at risk through a radical social experiment". Cornyn opposed allowing gay couples to adopt children.

In 2012, when President Obama announced his support for same-sex marriage, Cornyn criticized Obama and accused him of trying to "divide the country".

In 2021, when President Joe Biden reversed Trump's ban on transgender troops serving in the military, Cornyn accused Biden of dividing the country.

In 2022, at the Supreme Court confirmation hearings of Ketanji Brown Jackson, Cornyn expressed his position that state governments ought to have the power to ban same-sex marriage. The Supreme Court held in Obergefell v. Hodges that the 14th amendment barred states from doing so.

=== Victims' rights ===
Cornyn opposes profiting from memorabilia tied to convicted murderers, and has made several unsuccessful attempts to pass laws against it.

=== Election law ===
In 2021, Cornyn and Senate Republicans blocked the For the People Act, an election reform that would have created independent redistricting commissions to draw Congressional lines in all states and banned partisan gerrymandering. Cornyn described the bill as a power grab.

=== Removal of Confederate statues ===
Cornyn opposes the removal of statues relating to the Confederate States of America. He has said, "I don't think we can go back and erase our history by removing statues."

== Electoral history ==
2026 Republican primary runoff results
Party	Candidate	Votes	%
Republican	Ken Paxton	888,196	63.8
Republican	John Cornyn (incumbent)	503,438	36.2
Total votes		1,391,634	100.0

2026 United States Senate Republican primary results
Party	Candidate	Votes	%
Republican	John Cornyn (incumbent)	910,382	42.0
Republican	Ken Paxton	878,564	40.5
Republican	Wesley Hunt	293,250	13.5
Republican	Sara Canady	26,355	1.2
Republican	Anna Bender	24,167	1.1
Republican	Gulrez Khan	15,873	0.7
Republican	John Adefope	9,284	0.4
Republican	Virgil Bierschwale	9,035	0.4
Total votes		2,166,910	100.0

2020 United States Senate Republican primary election in Texas
Party	Candidate	Votes	%
Republican	John Cornyn (incumbent)	1,470,669	76.04%
Republican	Dwayne Stovall	231,104	11.95%
Republican	Mark Yancey	124,864	6.46%
Republican	John Anthony Castro	86,916	4.49%
Republican	Virgil Bierschwale	20,494	1.06%
Total votes		1,934,047	100.0%

2020 United States Senate election in Texas
Party	Candidate	Votes	%
Republican	John Cornyn (incumbent)	5,962,983	53.51%
Democratic	MJ Hegar	4,888,764	43.87%
Libertarian	Kerry McKennon	209,722	1.88%
Green	David Collins	81,893	0.73%
Independent	Ricardo Turullols-Bonilla (write-in)	678	0.01%
Total votes		11,144,040	100.0%
Republican hold			

2014 United States Senate Republican primary election in Texas
Party	Candidate	Votes	%
Republican	John Cornyn (incumbent)	781,259	59.43%
Republican	Steve Stockman	251,577	19.13%
Republican	Dwayne Stovall	140,794	10.71%
Republican	Linda Vega	50,057	3.80%
Republican	Ken Cope	34,409	2.61%
Republican	Chris Mapp	23,535	1.79%
Republican	Reid Reasor	20,600	1.56%
Republican	Curt Cleaver	12,325	0.94%
Total votes		1,314,556	100.00%

2014 United States Senate election in Texas
Party	Candidate	Votes	%
Republican	John Cornyn (incumbent)	2,843,995	61.60%
Democratic	David Alameel	1,584,772	34.32%
Libertarian	Rebecca Paddock	132,829	2.87%
Green	Emily Marie Sanchez	54,075	1.17%
Independent	Mohammed Tahiro	1,158	0.02%
Total votes		4,616,829	100%
Republican hold			

2008 United States Senate Republican primary election in Texas
Party	Candidate	Votes	%
Republican	John Cornyn (incumbent)	997,216	81.48%
Republican	Larry Kilgore	226,649	18.52%
Total votes		1,223,865	100%

2008 United States Senate election in Texas
Party	Candidate	Votes	%
Republican	John Cornyn (incumbent)	4,337,469	54.8%
Democratic	Rick Noriega	3,389,365	42.8%
Libertarian	Yvonne Adams Schick	185,241	2.3%
Total votes		7,912,075	100%
Republican hold			

2002 United States Senate Republican primary election in Texas
Party	Candidate	Votes	%
Republican	John Cornyn	478,825	77%
Republican	Bruce Rusty Lang	46,907	8%
Republican	Douglas Deffenbaugh	43,611	7%
Republican	Dudley Mooney	32,202	5%
Republican	Lawrence Cranberg	17,757	3%
Total votes		619,302	100%

2002 United States Senate election in Texas
Party	Candidate	Votes	%
Republican	John Cornyn	2,480,991	55%
Democratic	Ron Kirk	1,946,681	43%
Libertarian	Scott Jameson	35,538	1%
Green	Roy Williams	25,051	<1%
Total votes		4,488,261	100%
Republican hold			

1998 Texas Attorney General Republican primary election
Party	Candidate	Votes	%
Republican	Barry Williamson	208,345	38%
Republican	John Cornyn	176,269	32%
Republican	Tom Pauken	162,180	30%
Total votes		546,794	100%

1998 Texas Attorney General Republican primary runoff election
Party	Candidate	Votes	%
Republican	John Cornyn	135,130	58%
Republican	Barry Williamson	98,218	42%
Total votes		233,348	100%

1998 Texas Attorney General election
Party	Candidate	Votes	%
Republican	John Cornyn	2,002,794	54%
Democratic	Jim Mattox	1,632,045	44%
Libertarian	Mike Angwin	57,604	2%
Total votes		3,691,443	100%
Republican gain from Democratic			

1996 Texas Associate Justice Supreme Court election
Party	Candidate	Votes	%
Republican	John Cornyn (incumbent)	2,686,518	52%
Democratic	Patrice Barron	2,351,750	46%
Libertarian	Thomas Stults	129,203	2%
Total votes		5,167,471	100%
Republican hold			

1990 Texas Associate Justice Supreme Court election
Party	Candidate	Votes	%
Republican	John Cornyn	1,992,447	56%
Democratic	Gene Kelly	1,586,437	44%
Total votes		3,578,884	100%
Republican gain from Democratic			

== Personal life ==
Cornyn and his wife, Sandy Hansen, have two daughters. Cornyn receives pensions from three separate state and local governments in addition to his Senate salary.

As of 2018, according to OpenSecrets.org, Cornyn's net worth was more than $1.8 million.

Legal offices
Preceded by Franklin Spears	Associate Justice of the Texas Supreme Court; 1991–1997	Succeeded by Deborah Hankinson
Preceded by Dan Morales	Attorney General of Texas; 1999–2002	Succeeded by Greg Abbott
Party political offices
Preceded by Don Wittig	Republican nominee for Attorney General of Texas; 1998	Succeeded by Greg Abbott
Preceded by Phil Gramm	Republican nominee for U.S. Senator from Texas (Class 2); 2002, 2008, 2014, 2020	Succeeded by Ken Paxton
Preceded by Kay Bailey Hutchison	Vice Chair of the Senate Republican Conference; 2007–2009	Succeeded by John Thune
Preceded by John Ensign	Chair of the National Republican Senatorial Committee; 2009–2013	Succeeded by Jerry Moran
Preceded by Jon Kyl	Senate Republican Whip; 2013–2019	Succeeded by John Thune
U.S. Senate
Preceded by Phil Gramm	U.S. Senator (Class 2) from Texas; 2002–present Served alongside: Ted Cruz	Incumbent
Preceded by Tim Johnson	Ranking Member of the Senate Ethics Committee; 2007–2009	Succeeded by Johnny Isakson
Preceded by Jon Kyl	Senate Minority Whip; 2013–2015	Succeeded by Dick Durbin
Preceded by Dick Durbin	Senate Majority Whip; 2015–2019	Succeeded by John Thune
Preceded by Chuck Grassley	Chair of the Senate Narcotics Caucus; 2019–2021	Succeeded by Sheldon Whitehouse
Preceded by Dianne Feinstein	Ranking Member of the Senate Narcotics Caucus; 2021–2023	Succeeded by Chuck Grassley
Preceded by Sheldon Whitehouse	Chair of the Senate Narcotics Caucus; 2025–present	Incumbent
U.S. order of precedence (ceremonial)
Preceded by Maria Cantwell	Order of precedence of the United States as United States Senator	Succeeded by Lisa Murkowski
Preceded by Maria Cantwell	United States senators by seniority 11th	Succeeded by Lisa Murkowski
