= Tony Sanchez Jr. =

American businessperson (born 1943)

Tony Sanchez

Member of the University of Texas System Board of Regents
- In office February 1, 1997 – March 1, 2003
- Appointed by: George W. Bush
- Preceded by: Bernard Rapoport
- Succeeded by: James Huffines

Personal details
- Born: Antonio Rodolfo Sanchez Jr. February 3, 1943 (age 83) Laredo, Texas, U.S.
- Party: Democratic
- Education: St. Mary's University, Texas (BA, JD)

Antonio Rodolfo Sanchez Jr. (born February 3, 1943) is an American businessman and former politician. He is a member of the Democratic Party.

In 2002, Sanchez ran an unsuccessful campaign as the Democratic nominee for Governor of Texas against Republican incumbent Rick Perry. Sanchez is also known for his successful oil, natural gas, and banking operations, which are based in Laredo, Webb County, Texas.

== Early life and education ==
Sanchez, a descendant of Tomás Sánchez, was born on February 3, 1943, in Laredo, Texas, and attended to Saint Mary's University in San Antonio, where he earned a B.A. degree (1965) and J.D. (1969). He was a member of the Texas Parks and Wildlife Commission from 1985 to 1991. He also served on the University of Texas at Austin Board of Regents from 1997 to 2003.

== Oil and gas business ==
Participating in the oil and gas brokerage business that he and his father, Antonio Rodolfo Sanchez Sr., founded, Sanchez immediately envisioned expansion of the family business beyond a small operation into the larger scope business of oil and gas exploration, development, and production. Tony's father agreed; and in 1973, the father and son duo, along with their partner, Brian E. O'Brien, drilled a successful exploratory well in Webb County. This initial well started the development of the largest pool of natural gas found in the United States in 30 years.

Three decades after drilling its first well and participating in the drilling of over 1,000 wells in Texas and other states, the Sanchez Oil & Gas Corporation remains active in exploration and development, with operations concentrated in Texas.

Sanchez serves on the Conoco board of directors and is an active member of a number of organizations: the American Petroleum Institute, the Independent Petroleum Association of America and the Interstate Oil and Gas Compact Commission. In 1994, he was appointed to the National Petroleum Council, which advises the United States Secretary of Energy.

== 2002 Texas gubernatorial campaign ==
In March 2002, Sanchez, then a member of the University of Texas Board of Regents from 1997 to 2003, defeated former state Attorney General Dan Morales for the Democratic nomination for governor. Later, Morales endorsed Sanchez's Republican opponent, Rick Perry. Morales' brother was imprisoned for having attempted to blackmail Sanchez in the primary campaign. Morales himself went to prison for wrongdoing in connection with the state tobacco settlement.

During Sanchez's campaign to unseat Perry, the heated topic was homeowners' insurance reform. Questions arose over a multimillion-dollar settlement against Farmers Insurance Group regarding mold coverage and the role played by former state legislator Joe Nixon.

In several Texas cities, both Sanchez and the Democratic nominee for the United States Senate, Ron Kirk, the former mayor of Dallas, Texas, shared campaign space.

== Sanchez energy businesses and family involvement ==
Sanchez is former chairman and CEO of Sanchez Oil & Gas Corporation a privately held company that he built with his father, Antonio Sanchez, Sr. He is also the chairman of Sanchez Energy Corporation and Sanchez Midstream Partners, related publicly traded corporations. He and his family are also majority owners of International Bancshares Corporation (parent of International Bank of Commerce), a multibillion-dollar bank holding company, and Sanchez has been a major investor in Blockbuster, Viacom, and other high-tech ventures. His wealth has been estimated in excess of $600 million.

One of his sons, Tony Sanchez III, is the president and CEO of Sanchez Energy. His other son Patricio is president and COO of Sanchez Midstream Partners. The two sons are co-presidents of Sanchez Oil & Gas.

== Later political and philanthropic engagement ==
He has served as an aide to former Lieutenant Governor Ben Barnes. "Over Bush's career, Sanchez, members of his family, and employees of his companies have given him at least $320,150, making them his No. 2 career patron," according to the Center for Public Integrity.

After the March 7, 2006, primary, he announced his support for independent gubernatorial candidate Carole Keeton Strayhorn, who fared poorly in Webb County voting, in her general election campaign against Perry. He also donated campaign money to Democrat Michael Peter Skelly in his unsuccessful bid for a congressional seat in the race for Texas's 7th congressional district in 2008 against incumbent Republican John Culberson.

== Personal life ==
In 1972, Sanchez married Maria Josefina "Tani" Guajardo, a former schoolteacher. Together they have four children. Sanchez is a Roman Catholic.

== Electoral history ==
2002 Texas gubernatorial election
Party	Candidate	Votes	%	±%
Republican	Rick Perry (incumbent)	2,617,106	58.1	
Democratic	Tony Sanchez	1,809,915	40.3	

Party political offices
Preceded by Garry Mauro	Democratic nominee for Governor of Texas; 2002	Succeeded by Chris Bell
