= Dan Morales =

American lawyer

48th Attorney General of Texas
- In office January 15, 1991 – January 13, 1999
- Governor: Ann Richards; George W. Bush
- Preceded by: Jim Mattox
- Succeeded by: John Cornyn

Member of the Texas House of Representatives from the 124th district
- In office January 8, 1985 – January 8, 1991
- Preceded by: Joe Hernandez
- Succeeded by: Christine Hernandez

Personal details
- Born: Daniel C. Morales; April 24, 1956 (age 70) San Antonio, Texas, U.S.
- Party: Democratic
- Spouse: Christi Morales (m. 1997; div. 2003)
- Children: 3
- Education: Trinity University (BA); Harvard University (JD)
- Profession: Lawyer and politician

Daniel C. Morales (born April 24, 1956) is an American politician who served as the 48th attorney general of Texas from 1991 to 1999 during the administrations of Governors Ann Richards and George W. Bush. As Attorney General, Morales reached a $17 billion settlement with big tobacco companies.

He also authored the controversial state interpretation of the Hopwood v. Texas case, which ended all affirmative action in higher education in Texas until the United States Supreme Court reversed Hopwood in 2003. He is a graduate of Trinity University in San Antonio and Harvard Law School.

== Road to the Texas Legislature ==
Following his graduation from Harvard Law School, Morales landed his first postgraduate job at the Houston corporate law firm Bracewell and Patterson in 1981 and the following year joined the Bexar County district attorney's office. After an eighteen-month stint of prosecuting minor drug cases, the 28-year-old Morales ran successfully for the Texas House of Representatives representing the 124th District of San Antonio and was re-elected in 1986 and 1988. Morales said during an interview with Texas Monthly in 1996, that while toiling as a Bexar County prosecutor, "the exposure to the system and seeing victims get the shaft impressed upon me that changes needed to be made." Those changes, Morales came to learn, were best addressed at the legislative level, so he felt compelled to run in 1984 against the incumbent legislator and defense attorney Joe Hernandez. The young candidate excoriated Hernandez for, as Morales put it, "abusing the legislative continuance statute to delay the trials of rapists, murderers, and drug dealers he was representing."

== Attorney General of Texas ==
After six years in the legislature, the earnest but obscure three-term San Antonio legislator announced his candidacy for Attorney General of Texas. The position opened up following the two-term incumbent, Jim Mattox declining to seek a third term—and later unsuccessfully ran for the Democratic nomination for Governor of Texas, losing the nomination in a runoff to then-Texas State Treasurer Ann Richards.

Though his professional history suggested no particular dedication to minority issues, Hispanics turned out for Morales in droves in 1990, enabling him to eke out a victory over the Republican nominee, State Senator J. E. "Buster" Brown of Lake Jackson. Morales polled 1,729,735 votes (51.81 percent) to Brown's 1,509,553 votes (45.22 percent). He was reelected to a second term in the largely Republican year of 1994 defeating Republican, Harris County Civil Court Judge Don Wittig, by polling 2,289,389 votes (53.70 percent) to Wittig's 1,850,403 votes (43.40 percent), but did not seek a third term as attorney general in 1998 and was succeeded by Republican Texas Supreme Court justice, John Cornyn, in 1997. Cornyn later ran successfully for the U.S. Senate in 2002 and was re-elected in 2008, 2014, and 2020.

== Run for Governor ==
In 2002, Morales had been expected to run for the vacant U.S. Senate seat held by the retiring three-term Republican Phil Gramm, however, he entered the Democratic gubernatorial primary for Governor of Texas but lost the nomination to Tony Sanchez by a landslide on March 12, 2002. Sanchez polled 624,991 votes (60.99 percent) to Morales' 336,102 votes (32.80 percent). Sanchez lost the general election to Rick Perry by another landslide.

== Guilty plea and sentencing ==
In October 2003, Morales reached a plea deal and admitted to having falsified documents in an attempt to give another lawyer a chunk of the state's tobacco settlement. Before the agreement, Morales had faced trial on twelve counts that included conspiracy and using political money for private purposes. Morales and a onetime law associate were indicted on federal charges of trying to fraudulently obtain hundreds of millions of dollars in attorney fees from a state settlement with tobacco companies.

Upon his plea of guilt, federal Judge Sam Sparks said. "You've breached the very valuable trust the people of Texas gave you,"

== Personal life ==
Morales and his ex-wife, Christine, have a son, Christian. During their marriage he helped raise their son, his step-daughter, Shayne, and step-son, Greyson.

Party political offices
Preceded by Jim Mattox	Democratic nominee for Texas Attorney General; 1990, 1994	Succeeded by Jim Mattox
Texas House of Representatives
Preceded by Joe Hernandez	Member of the Texas House of Representatives from District 124 (San Antonio); 1985–1991	Succeeded by Christine Hernandez
Legal offices
Preceded by Jim Mattox	Attorney General of Texas; January 15, 1991 – January 13, 1999	Succeeded by John Cornyn
