= Christine Hernandez =

American educator and legislator

Christine Hernandez (born July 23, 1951) is a former Texas educator and legislator of Hispanic descent who sat as a member of the Texas House of Representatives from 1991 to 1999.

The daughter of Joe Hernandez and Aurora Zapata, she was born in San Antonio, attending high school and college there. She received a BA in sociology and a teaching certificate from Our Lady of the Lake University. She taught elementary school for ten years. At the same time, she earned a master's degree in bilingual teacher education from the University of Texas at San Antonio. Hernandez later became president of the San Antonio Federation of Teachers. In 1986, she was elected to the San Antonio Independent School District. She became the first Hispanic woman named to the Texas Association of School Boards and to sit on the board of directors of the Star Bar of Texas.

In 1991, she became the first Hispanic woman to be elected to the Texas House of Representatives; she was reelected in 1993, 1995 and 1997. In 1988, she was a delegate to the Democratic National Convention in Atlanta.

In 1985, she was named one of the "100 Young Women with Promise" by Good Housekeeping magazine. She was named Hispanic Woman of the Year in 1984 by the Mexican American Democrats of San Antonio. In 1988, she received the Mexican American Women's National Association Award.

Texas House of Representatives
Preceded by Dan Morales	Member of the Texas House of Representatives from District 124 (San Antonio); 1991–1999	Succeeded by Jose Menendez
