= Morris Overstreet =

American judge (1950–2024)

Judge, Texas Court of Criminal Appeals
- In office January 1, 1991 – December 31, 1998
- Preceded by: Louis Sturns
- Succeeded by: Cheryl Johnson

Personal details
- Born: July 10, 1950 Amarillo, Texas, U.S.
- Died: March 3, 2024 (aged 73) Houston, Texas, U.S.
- Party: Democratic
- Spouse(s): Carla F. Ortique, MD
- Education: Angelo State University (B.A.) Texas Southern University School of Law (J.D.)
- Occupation: Lawyer

Morris L. Overstreet (July 10, 1950 – March 3, 2024) was an American judge. He was the first African-American elected to a statewide office in the history of the State of Texas. He was twice elected to serve on the state's highest criminal appellate court, the Texas Court of Criminal Appeals, serving from 1991 through 1998. As a member of the court, he authored over 500 opinions.

== Education ==
Overstreet was a graduate of Amarillo High School in Amarillo. He earned a Bachelor of Arts degree in Sociology with minors in Biology and Chemistry from Angelo State University in San Angelo, Texas. He earned a Juris Doctor Degree from Texas Southern University School of Law in Houston, Texas in 1975.

== Career ==
Before joining the Court of Criminal Appeals, Overstreet served for five years as a prosecutor in the 47th Judicial District at the District Attorney’s Office in Amarillo, where he advanced to first assistant district attorney. He also presided over the Potter County Court at Law Number 1 in Amarillo for four years. As a prosecutor and trial judge involved in hundreds of jury trials and thousands of non-jury trials, Overstreet never had a criminal conviction reversed on appeal because of any error committed by him.

Overstreet chose not to seek re-election to the court in 1998, and ran for attorney general of Texas that year instead. He lost the Democratic primary to former attorney general Jim Mattox.

In January 1999, he qualified as a certified contract advisor with the National Football League Players Association and was authorized to negotiate contracts between players and NFL clubs. He was a life member of the National Bar Association and was also a member of the American Bar Association, and served as a former chair of the Judicial Council Division. Overstreet was also the president of the Auxiliary to the National Medical Association.

From August 1999 to May 2000, he served as the distinguished visiting professor of law at his alma mater, Thurgood Marshall School of Law, Texas Southern University in Houston, Texas. In September 2002, Overstreet returned to Texas Southern University, where he served as the director of the Legal Clinic and professor of evidence and criminal procedure for four years.

In private practice, Overstreet served as general counsel to the Texas State Baptist Convention and chair of its statewide Bible Drill Competition. He also served as the national legal counsel for Phi Beta Sigma fraternity and was a former chair of the State Bar Crime Victims Committee.

== Memberships ==
Overstreet was a member of Mount Zion Baptist Church in Amarillo, Texas, and attended Windsor Village United Methodist Church. He was also a life member of both the National Association for the Advancement of Colored People and Phi Beta Sigma fraternity. He was also a member of Sigma Pi Phi fraternity. He was a frequent lecturer and public speaker and had taught continuing legal educational classes statewide for justices of the peace, Constitutional county judges, municipal court judges, local bar associations, the State Bar of Texas Advance Criminal Law Seminar, and the National Bar Association.

== Death ==
Overstreet died of prostate cancer on March 3, 2024, at the age of 73.

== See also ==
- List of African-American jurists
