= Tex Lezar =

American politician (1948–2004)

Harold Joseph Lezar Jr.

Staff Assistant and Speechwriter in the White House
- In office 1971–1974
- President: Richard Nixon

Assistant Attorney General for the Office of Legal Policy; Chief of Staff to the U.S. Attorney General
- In office 1984–1985
- President: Ronald Reagan

General Counsel to the Secretary of State of Texas
- In office 1979–1980
- Appointed by: George Strake Jr.

Personal details
- Born: Harold Joseph Lezar Jr. September 30, 1948 Dallas, Texas, U.S.
- Died: January 5, 2004 (aged 55) Dallas, Texas, U.S.
- Cause of death: Cardiac arrest
- Spouse: Merrie Spaeth (m. 1984)
- Children: Beau, Philip, Maverick
- Education: Yale College (BA); University of Texas School of Law (JD)
- Alma mater: Yale College; University of Texas at Austin
- Occupation: Lawyer, political figure, public policy specialist
- Known for: Assistant Attorney General, Chief of Staff in the U.S. Department of Justice

Harold Joseph Lezar, Jr., better known as Tex Lezar (September 30, 1948 – January 5, 2004), was an American lawyer, political figure, and public policy specialist known for his work in both state and federal government roles. He served as a U.S. Assistant Attorney General and Chief of Staff in the U.S. Department of Justice during the Reagan administration and was involved in Texas state politics.

== Early life and education ==
Born in Dallas, Texas, Tex Lezar spent part of his childhood in Japan due to his father's deployment with the United States Navy during the Korean War. Influenced by his father's service, Lezar developed an early appreciation for service and leadership. Returning to the United States, he attended Yale College, earning a Bachelor of Arts with honors in Intensive Philosophy in 1970. He continued his education at the University of Texas School of Law, where he distinguished himself as the editor-in-chief of the Texas Law Review, graduating with a Juris Doctor in 1976.

== Career ==
=== Legal and political career ===
Tex Lezar began his career as an assistant to William F. Buckley Jr. at the National Review, and then as a staff assistant and speechwriter in the White House for President Richard Nixon. After completing his Juris Doctor, Lezar was admitted to the State Bar of Texas in 1977. He was admitted to practice before the U.S. Supreme Court in 1982, as well as in the U.S. District Court for the Northern and Southern Districts of Texas and the U.S. Court of Appeals, Fifth Circuit.

In the late 1970s, he served as special counsel to John B. Connally, Jr., the former Governor of Texas, and was appointed General Counsel to Texas Secretary of State George Strake Jr. from 1979 to 1980. In the Reagan administration, Lezar served as Special Counsel and later as Counselor to United States Attorney General William French Smith. He later served as Attorney General Smith's chief of staff. In 1984, President Reagan nominated Lezar to be the U.S. Assistant Attorney General for the Office of Legal Policy, advising on a range of legal issues, including civil and criminal law, and playing a role in the federal judicial appointment process, as evidenced in a 1982 memo from John G. Roberts, who would later become the Chief Justice of the U.S. Supreme Court. Lezar was recognized by President Reagan for his work in organizing efforts against organized crime and contributed to international legal negotiations on drug trafficking, extradition, and refugee assistance, including participating as a member of the U.S. Delegation to the International Conference on African Refugee Assistance II.

Furthermore, as vice chairman of the Attorney General's Commission on Pornography, established under the Reagan administration, Lezar contributed to the comprehensive study of the effects of pornography on society. The commission's findings were documented in a report, commonly referred to as the Meese Report, which became a reference point in subsequent legislative and policy discussions concerning obscenity laws and the regulation of pornographic materials.

Returning to Texas, Lezar joined the law firm of Carrington, Coleman, Sloman & Blumenthal and later co-founded Daniel & Lezar. His professional endeavors also included serving on Senator Phil Gramm's Federal Judicial Evaluation Committee.

Lezar held leadership roles in several legal and policy institutes, including serving on the board of directors of the Institute of Judicial Administration, where he contributed to shaping judicial practices and legal frameworks. He served on the faculty of the American Bar Association's Judicial Division's 11th National Appellate Institute in Washington, D.C., where he trained lawyers in appellate advocacy. Additionally, he served as vice-chairman and senior advisor of the Federalist Society's National Litigation Practice Group.

In 1990, he sought the office of Attorney General, but lost the Republican primary. In 1994, Lezar sought the office of lieutenant governor of Texas but did not succeed in the election against incumbent Democrat Bob Bullock.

== Community involvement ==
Throughout his career, Lezar played roles in shaping public policy both directly and indirectly. After running for lieutenant governor of Texas in 1994, he became president and chief executive officer of Empower America, actively promoting a pro-growth national public policy agenda.

Lezar's dedication to legal education and policy was reflected in his roles as president and long-term board member of the Texas Law Review Association, and in his active participation as an advisory board member for both the Texas Review of Law & Politics and the Southwestern Law Enforcement Institute. Additionally, he shared his expertise as an adjunct professor of constitutional law at Texas Wesleyan University.

Lezar's professional engagements included membership in the American Law Institute and active participation in the State Bar of Texas, the Dallas Bar Association, and the American Bar Association.

Additionally, Lezar was a Life Fellow of the American Bar Foundation, a Fellow of the Texas Bar Foundation, and a Fellow of the Center for American and International Law. He also led the Associated Texans Against Crime and served as president of the Texas Public Policy Foundation, where he edited the influential book Making Government Work: A Conservative Agenda for the States, proposing significant changes to improve state government.

== Personal life ==
Tex Lezar married Merrie Spaeth, the former director of White House media relations under President Reagan, in June 1984. The couple lived in Rosslyn, Virginia, before eventually moving back to Texas. He had three children: sons Beau and Philip, and daughter Maverick.

He was a featured columnist with numerous Texas newspapers, a contributor to The Wall Street Journal, a frequent commentator on radio stations nationwide, and a guest on various television news shows. He was a member of First Presbyterian Church of Dallas.

== Death and legacy ==
Tex Lezar died from cardiac arrest on January 5, 2004, at Doctors Hospital in Dallas. Following his death, he was commemorated with a memorial service at First Presbyterian Church of Dallas and graveside services at Hillcrest Memorial Park.

Several figures publicly acknowledged Lezar's contributions. On the floor of the U.S. House of Representatives, Congressman Michael C. Burgess described Lezar as "a luminary in political and legal circles" and praised his leadership qualities. Ken Starr, a longtime close friend and former Whitewater special prosecutor, referred to Lezar as "one of the most talented lawyers of our generation," highlighting his legal skill and understanding of public policy. Judge Patrick Higginbotham of the U.S. Court of Appeals for the Fifth Circuit noted Lezar's "outstanding ability to write and his deep comprehension of complex political and legal issues."

At the University of Texas School of Law, the Tex Lezar Memorial Fund benefits the Texas Review of Law & Politics, an organization where Lezar was a member of its board of advisors. The organization holds an annual lecture series named after him. Additionally, Merrie Spaeth, Lezar's widow, contributes a merit award annually to a Texas Review of Law & Politics member who exemplifies Lezar's work ethic.
