= 1994 Texas lieutenant gubernatorial election =

- November 8, 1994
- Turnout: 49.5% (Note: Of registered voters.) ▼0.8%
Nominee	Bob Bullock	Tex Lezar
Party	Democratic	Republican
Popular vote	2,631,843	1,648,848
Percentage	61.5%	38.5%
- County results Bullock: 50–60% 60–70% 70–80% 80–90% Lazar: 50–60%
Lieutenant Governor before election
Bob Bullock
Democratic
Elected Lieutenant Governor
Bob Bullock
Democratic

The 1994 Texas lieutenant gubernatorial election was held on November 8, 1994, to elect the Lieutenant Governor of Texas. Incumbent Democrat Bob Bullock successfully ran for re-election against Republican Attorney Tex Lezar and won in a landslide. Bullock had announced his intent to run for re-election through a newsletter in September 1992; the early announcement was a signature of his and allowed him to begin fundraising much earlier and helped to dissuade potential opponents from challenging him. This was the last time where a Democrat won a statewide race in Texas until 2026. It is also the last time that the lieutenant gubernatorial election voted for a different party than the winning gubernatorial election.

== Primaries ==
Democratic primary results
Party	Candidate	Votes	%
Democratic	Bob Bullock (incumbent)	783,980	100.0%
Total votes		783,980	100.0%

Republican primary results
Party	Candidate	Votes	%
Republican	H.J. "Tex" Lezar	367,206	100.0%
Total votes		367,206	100.0%

== General election ==
Bullock won the election in a landslide against Lezar garnering a 22.96% lead over him; this was an outlier from other Democrats statewide who saw much narrower races. Bullock, a popular incumbent despite his past controversies, was a conservative Democrat and received the endorsements of numerous city newspapers across the state, in addition to his victories in ancestrally Democratic counties and big cities, Bullock saw significant support in rural, conservative counties as well.

General election results
Party	Candidate	Votes	%
Democratic	Bob Bullock	2,631,843	61.5%
Republican	H.J. "Tex" Lezar	1,648,848	38.5%
Total votes		4,280,691	100.0%
