= International Bank of Commerce =

Bank based in Texas, United States

Coordinates: 27.5101°N 99.5042°W

International Bancshares Corporation
- Type: Public
- Traded as: Nasdaq: IBOC; S&P 400 Component
- Industry: Finance and Insurance
- Founded: 1966; 60 years ago
- Founders: A. R. Sanchez, Sr.; Honoré Ligarde
- Headquarters: 1200 San Bernardo Avenue, Laredo, Texas 78040
- Key people: Dennis Nixon (CEO)
- Products: Banking; Investments; Insurance
- Website: ibc.com

International Bank of Commerce (IBC) is a state chartered bank owned by International Bancshares Corporation headquartered in Laredo, Texas (United States). It is one of the largest banks based in Texas, and is the 83rd largest U.S. bank by asset size. In addition, IBC is the largest minority-owned bank in the United States. The motto of the bank is "We Do More".

== History ==
IBC currently serves eighty-eight communities throughout Texas and Oklahoma with 166 branches and 256 ATMs.

Honoré Ligarde, a state representative for Webb County from 1963 to 1973, was a founder and later the IBC president.

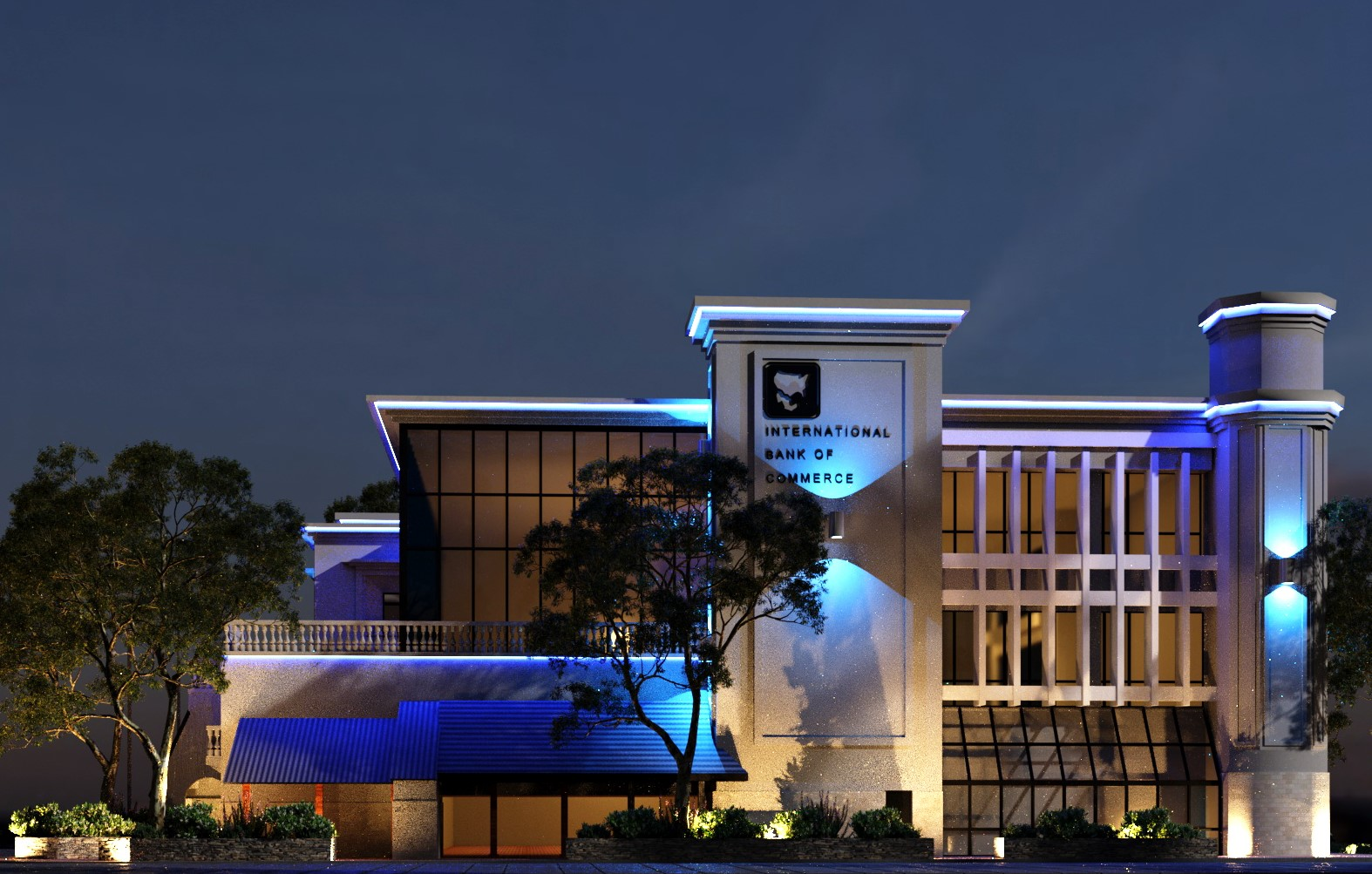
IBC Bank corporate headquarters in Laredo, Texas
