= International Bancshares Corporation =

American financial services company

- Company type: Public
- Traded as: Nasdaq: IBOC; S&P 400 Component
- Industry: Commercial Banks
- Founded: 1966; 60 years ago
- Headquarters: Laredo, Texas
- Number of locations: 315
- Website: ibc.com/

International Bancshares Corporation is a bank holding company based in Laredo, Texas whose primary subsidiary is International Bank of Commerce. Through its bank subsidiaries, it has 217 banking offices and 315 automated teller machines serving 88 communities in the U.S. states of Texas and Oklahoma.

In 2002, Tony Sanchez, a member of the Sanchez family that is the largest owner of IBC, ran as the Democratic Party candidate for Governor of Texas, but lost to incumbent Republican Rick Perry. In 2012, the company was named one of "America’s 100 Most Trustworthy Companies" by Forbes magazine.

In 2024, S&P Global Market Intelligence ranked International Bancshares Corp. as the "Best Performing U.S. Public Bank with more than $10 billion in assets."
