= Barry Williamson =

American lawyer

Barry Ashlin Williamson

Chairman of the Railroad Commission of Texas
- In office January 1997 – June 1998
- Governor: George W. Bush
- Preceded by: Carole Keeton Rylander
- Succeeded by: Carole Keeton Rylander

Railroad Commissioner of Texas
- In office January 5, 1993 – January 3, 1999
- Governor: Ann Richards; George W. Bush
- Preceded by: Jim Wallace
- Succeeded by: Tony Garza

Personal details
- Born: June 19, 1957 (age 68) Arkansas, U.S.
- Party: Republican
- Spouse: Holly Holt Williamson
- Children: 2
- Occupation: Attorney

Barry Ashlin Williamson (born June 19, 1957) is an attorney from Austin, Texas, who was from 1993 to 1999 a Republican member of the Texas Railroad Commission. In 1992, he defeated the appointed incumbent Lena Guerrero, a Democrat, to win a seat on the three-member panel which regulates oil and natural gas operations (not railroads).

Political offices
Preceded by Jim Wallace (interim)	Texas Railroad Commissioner; 1992–1999	Succeeded by Tony Garza
