= Jim Mattox =

American politician (1943–2008)

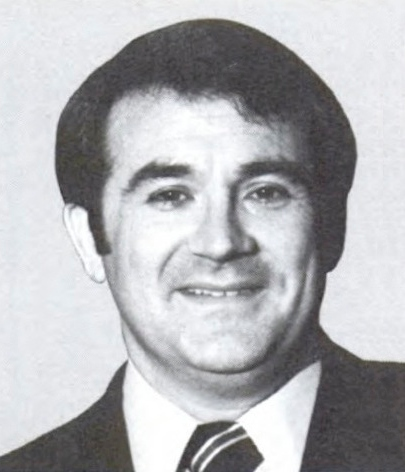
- Mattox in 1979

47th Attorney General of Texas
- In office January 18, 1983 – January 15, 1991
- Governor: Mark White; Bill Clements
- Preceded by: Mark White
- Succeeded by: Dan Morales

Member of the U.S. House of Representatives from Texas's 5th district
- In office January 3, 1977 – January 3, 1983
- Preceded by: Alan Steelman
- Succeeded by: John Bryant

Member of the Texas House of Representatives from the 33—K district
- In office January 14, 1973 – January 11, 1977
- Preceded by: District established
- Succeeded by: David Cain

Personal details
- Born: James Albon Mattox; August 29, 1943 Dallas, Texas, U.S.
- Died: November 20, 2008 (aged 65) Dripping Springs, Texas, U.S.
- Resting place: Texas State Cemetery
- Party: Democratic
- Spouse: Marta Jan Karpan
- Children: 2
- Education: Baylor University (AB); Southern Methodist University (JD)

James Albon Mattox (August 29, 1943 – November 20, 2008) was an American lawyer and politician who served in the United States House of Representatives from 1977 to 1983 and as the attorney general of Texas from 1983 to 1991. He lost high-profile races for governor in 1990, the U.S. Senate in 1994, and again as attorney general in 1998. He was a member of the Democratic Party.

== Congressional service, 1977–1983 ==
In 1961, Mattox graduated in Dallas from Woodrow Wilson High School. He received his Bachelor of Arts in 1965 from Baylor University in Waco and his juris doctor degree from the Southern Methodist University Dedman School of Law.

Considered a political liberal Mattox was elected to Congress from the Fifth Congressional District in 1976, 1978, and 1980. In his first election, running on the Jimmy Carter-Walter F. Mondale ticket, he defeated former Dallas Mayor Wes Wise, 60.9 to 33.9%.

== Attorney General, 1983–1991 ==
In 1983, Mattox was indicted for commercial bribery and prosecuted by Travis County District Attorney Ronnie Earle, a Democrat close to the late Governor Ann Richards. Earle later prosecuted the Republican congressional leader Tom DeLay. Like the DeLay prosecution, the political background of the Mattox prosecution related to an attempt to conceal the delivery of corporate funds to an election campaign. Mattox had received a campaign contribution of $125,000 from his sister Janice, a Dallas lawyer. Janice Mattox, in turn, had obtained a similar amount from Seafirst Bank in Seattle, which had close ties to Mattox supporter Clinton Manges, a controversial South Texas rancher-oilman who was the successor to George Parr, the corrupt "Duke of Duval". Manges was co-plaintiff with the state (represented by Mattox) in major litigation against Mobil Oil Company. Mobil had attempted to depose Janice Mattox concerning the Seafirst transaction, which led Mattox to threaten Mobil's law firm, Fulbright & Jaworski, with loss of its tax-exempt bond practice, a power held by the attorney general in Texas. Secretly recorded by the recipient of the threats, Mattox did not deny threatening the law firm, nor did he deny the Seafirst transactions, his defense being based on the legal definition of the crime of "commercial bribery". After a long trial, Mattox was acquitted.

His aggressive attacks on alleged wrongdoing by corporations gained him considerable popular support.

In 1989, Mattox was inducted into the Woodrow Wilson High School Hall of Fame.

== Challenging Ann Richards, 1990 ==
In 1990, Mattox chose not to seek re-election to a third term as attorney general and sought the Democratic gubernatorial nomination. He alleged that his principal opponent, outgoing State Treasurer Ann Richards, had used cocaine and was a recovering alcoholic who might falter in handling the strains associated with being governor. Mattox went into a runoff election with Richards because the third contender, former Governor Mark White, polled enough votes to keep both Mattox and Richards from winning an outright majority. Due to publicity exposing Mattox's aggressive tactics used in Corporate attacks to bolster his support, Richards went on to win the nomination and the election, very narrowly, over Republican businessman Clayton Wheat Williams, Jr., of Midland.

== Failed comeback attempts, 1994 and 1998 ==
In 1994, Mattox ran for the U.S. Senate, but he eventually lost the Democratic nomination to Richard W. Fisher, who had been a Ross Perot operative in the 1992 presidential election. Fisher was also the son-in-law of former Third District Republican Congressman James M. Collins of Dallas. Collins lost the 1982 senatorial general election to Lloyd Bentsen. Fisher was then defeated in the November 1994 general election by the freshman Republican Senator Kay Bailey Hutchison.

In 1998, Mattox tried to return to the attorney general's position, but lost the general election to Republican John Cornyn, a former member of the Texas Supreme Court. Cornyn polled 2,002,794 votes (54.25 percent) to Mattox's 1,631,045 ballots (44.18 percent). (A third candidate received 1.56 percent.) Cornyn had defeated two other candidates for the Republican nomination as attorney general, outgoing Texas Railroad Commissioner Barry Williamson and Mattox's old rival, Tom Pauken. Cornyn became the first Republican ever elected as attorney general of Texas. Four years later, Cornyn vacated that office to become one of Texas's two U.S. senators.

== Advocate for ending the "Texas Two-Step" ==
Five days before his death, Jim Mattox testified to a Texas Democratic Party Committee on the Party's method of awarding presidential delegates based on a primary vote plus evening caucuses. Mattox said the system, known as the Texas Two-Step, was an embarrassment to the party. "Now let me tell you, folks," Mattox said. "This system we've got is an expensive system. It's an unintelligible system. It is an acrimonious system across the board. It is subject to misconduct, it is subject to fraud, it is subject to manipulation. It's unfair, it's uncertain, it's inaccurate, and it's an embarrassment to our party." The Texas Democratic Party abandoned the former caucus-based "Texas Two-step" primary system in 2015.

== Death ==
In 2008, Mattox worked in Hillary Clinton's unsuccessful bid for the Democratic presidential nomination. He died eight months thereafter at the age of 65 of a heart attack in his sleep at his home in Dripping Springs in Hays County west of Austin.

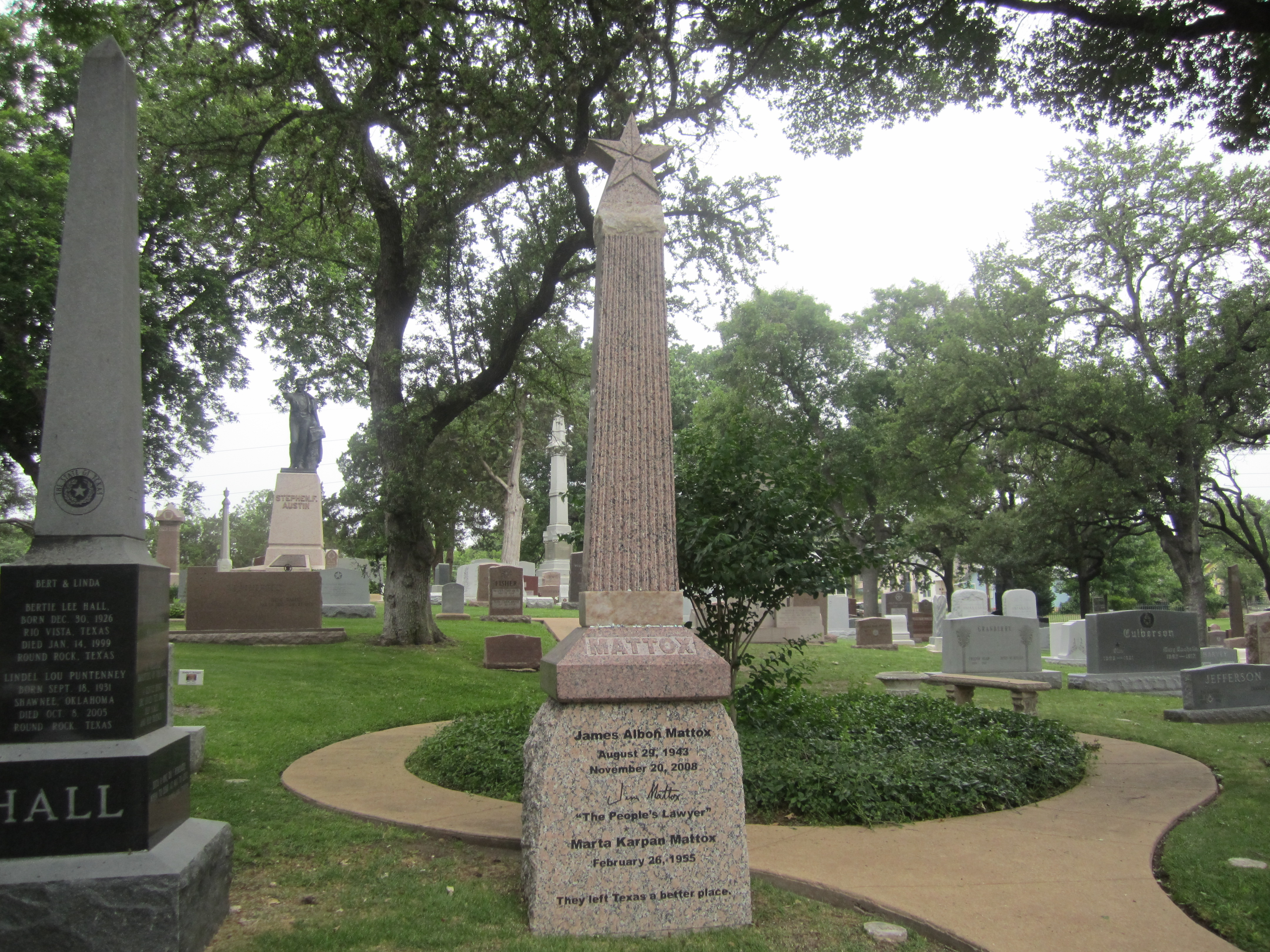
Jim Mattox monument at Texas State Cemetery in Austin, Texas

Mattox's body lay in repose at the Texas House of Representatives chamber inside the Texas Capitol rotunda on Monday, November 24, 2008. Services were held on Tuesday, November 25, 2008 at the First Baptist Church, 901 Trinity Street in Austin. He is interred at the Texas State Cemetery, 909 Navasota Street in Austin.

Party political offices
| Preceded by Mark White | Democratic nominee for Texas Attorney General; 1982, 1986 | Succeeded by Dan Morales |
| Preceded by Dan Morales | Democratic nominee for Texas Attorney General; 1998 | Succeeded by Kirk Watson |
U.S. House of Representatives
| Preceded by Alan Steelman | United States Representative for the 5th Congressional District of Texas; 1977–1983 | Succeeded by John Wiley Bryant |
Legal offices
| Preceded by Mark White | Attorney General of Texas; January 18, 1983 – January 15, 1991 | Succeeded by Dan Morales |
