= Old Salem, Texas =

- Unincorporated community
- Location within Texas Location within the United States
- Coordinates: 33°27′5″N 94°31′38″W
- Country: United States
- State: Texas
- County: Bowie
- Elevation: 361 ft (110 m)
- Time zone: UTC-6 (Central (CST))
  - Summer (DST): UTC-5 (CDT)
- Area codes: 903 & 430
- GNIS feature ID: 1380303

Old Salem is an unincorporated community in Bowie County, in the U.S. state of Texas. According to the Handbook of Texas, the community had a population of 50 in 2000. It is located within the Texarkana metropolitan area.

== Geography ==
Old Salem is located near the intersection of Interstate 30 and Farm to Market Road 1840, 5 mi (8.0 km) southwest of New Boston and 26 mi (42 km) west of Texarkana in west-central Bowie County. It is also located 6.5 mi (10.5 km) southeast of DeKalb and 35 mi (56 km) south of Idabel, Oklahoma.

== Education ==
Old Salem had its own school in the 1930s. Today, the community is served by the Simms Independent School District.
