= Texas State Highway 98 =

State highway in Texas

State Highway 98
- SH 98 highlighted in red

Route information
- Maintained by TxDOT
- Length: 8.91 mi (14.34 km)
- Existed: 1924–present

Major junctions
- South end: US 67 near Simms
- I-30 near New Boston
- North end: US 82 near New Boston

Location
- Country: United States
- State: Texas

Highway system
- Highways in Texas; Interstate; US; State; Former; Toll; Loops; Spurs; FM/RM; Park; Rec
← SH 97	→ SH 99

State Highway 98 (SH 98) is a north–south state highway in Bowie County, Texas, covering a total distance of 8.913 miles (14.344 km). Its northern terminus is at U.S. Highway 82, 3.3 miles (5.3 km) due west of New Boston. From there, it travels half a mile south, passing under Interstate 30. Two miles further south, it intersects Farm to Market Road 1840, and FM 561 beyond that. It ends at U.S. Highway 67 in the unincorporated community of Simms. The original route originally ended closer to New Boston traveling along current FM 1840, but was redirected north along FM 2552 in 1966.

== Route description ==
SH 98 begins at an intersection with U.S. Route 67 at the community of Simms. The route then travels to the north through ranchlands and forested areas in central Bowie County. Noteworthy sights along this route include the Telford Unit, a 2,832-bed Texas Department of Criminal Justice prison site named for state congressman and De Kalb resident Barry Telford. The route crosses Interstate 30 before reaching its northern terminus about a mile further north at U.S. Route 82. The road continues further north as Farm to Market Road 3378.

== History ==
The route is one of few routes that has changed its path very little since it was designated. The route was initially designated on July 18, 1924 between Simms and New Boston. On October 3, 1966, the route was redirected northward away from entering New Boston and to instead connect with Interstate 30, replacing Farm to Market Road 2552, which had just been paved at the time. The road into New Boston was re-designated as an eastward extension of Farm to Market Road 1840.

== Junction list ==
The entire route is in Bowie County.

Location	mi	km	Destinations	Notes
Simms	0.0	0.0	US 67 – Mt. Pleasant, Texarkana	
	1.7	2.7	FM 561 west	
	6.4	10.3	FM 1840 – De Kalb, Boston	
	8.3	13.4	I-30 – Dallas, Texarkana	I-30 exit 198.
	8.9	14.3	US 82 – De Kalb, New Boston	
1.000 mi = 1.609 km; 1.000 km = 0.621 mi
