= Beaver Dam, Texas =

- Unincorporated community
- Location within Texas Location within the United States
- Coordinates: 33°38′11″N 94°40′17″W
- Country: United States
- State: Texas
- County: Bowie
- Elevation: 377 ft (115 m)
- Time zone: UTC-6 (Central (CST))
  - Summer (DST): UTC-5 (CDT)
- Area codes: 903 & 430
- GNIS feature ID: 1381379

Beaver Dam is an unincorporated community in Bowie County, in the U.S. state of Texas. According to the Handbook of Texas, the community had a population of 55 in 2000. It is located within the Texarkana metropolitan area.

== History ==
Beaver Dam was named after a large beaver dam at a nearby creek. The predominantly black community did not have a post office, but it did have a business and 10 residents in 1933. The population increased to 25 in the 1940s and 1950s. By the 1980s, Beaver Dam had a church, cemetery, and scattered houses. In 2000, the population was 55.

On April 2–3, 1982, an F3 tornado swept through the community, destroying five homes.

== Geography ==
Beaver Dam is located 14 mi (23 km) northwest of DeKalb in the northeastern part of the county. It is also located 22 mi (35 km) northeast of Clarksville, 19 mi (31 km) northwest of New Boston, and 45 mi (72 km) west of Texarkana, just off Texas State Highway 59 and the intersection of two rural roads.

== Education ==
Beaver Dam is served by the DeKalb Independent School District.
