= Old Union, Bowie County, Texas =

- Unincorporated community
- Location within Texas Location within the United States
- Coordinates: 33°20′33″N 94°27′57″W
- Country: United States
- State: Texas
- County: Bowie
- Elevation: 322 ft (98 m)
- Time zone: UTC-6 (Central (CST))
  - Summer (DST): UTC-5 (CDT)
- Area codes: 903 & 430
- GNIS feature ID: 1380897

Old Union is an unincorporated community in Bowie County, in the U.S. state of Texas. According to the Handbook of Texas, the community had a population of 238 in 2000. It is located within the Texarkana metropolitan area.

== Geography ==
Old Union is located on U.S. Route 67, 9 mi (14 km) southwest of New Boston and 25 mi (40 km) southwest of Texarkana in southern Bowie County.

== Education ==
A log schoolhouse was built around 1830. Today, Old Union is served by the Simms Independent School District.
