= College Hill, Texas =

- Unincorporated community
- Location within Texas Location within the United States
- Coordinates: 33°24′56″N 94°36′47″W
- Country: United States
- State: Texas
- County: Bowie
- Elevation: 374 ft (114 m)
- Time zone: UTC-6 (Central (CST))
  - Summer (DST): UTC-5 (CDT)
- Area codes: 903 & 430
- GNIS feature ID: 1379576

College Hill is an unincorporated community in Bowie County, in the U.S. state of Texas. According to the Handbook of Texas, the community had a population of 116 in 1990. It is located within the Texarkana metropolitan area.

== Geography ==
College Hill is located on Farm to Market Road 44, 7 mi (11 km) south of DeKalb, 33 mi (53 km) west of Texarkana, and 20 mi (32 km) west of Boston in southwestern Bowie County.

== Education ==
College Hill is served by the Simms Independent School District. It joined the school district with eight other nearby communities in 1938.
