= Ward Creek, Texas =

- Unincorporated community
- Location within Texas Location within the United States
- Coordinates: 33°21′58″N 94°37′49″W
- Country: United States
- State: Texas
- County: Bowie
- Elevation: 335 ft (102 m)
- Time zone: UTC-6 (Central (CST))
  - Summer (DST): UTC-5 (CDT)
- Area codes: 903 & 430
- GNIS feature ID: 2034807

Ward Creek is an unincorporated community in Bowie County, in the U.S. state of Texas. According to the Handbook of Texas, the community had a population of 164 in 2000. It is located within the Texarkana metropolitan area.

== Geography ==
Ward Creek is located off of Farm to Market Road 561, 14 mi (23 km) southwest of New Boston and 34 mi (55 km) west-southwest of Texarkana in southwestern Bowie County.

== Education ==
Ward Creek had its own school from the second half of the 19th century to the 1930s. Today, Ward Creek is served by the Simms Independent School District.
