= Oak Grove, Bowie County, Texas =

- Unincorporated community
- Location within Texas Location within the United States
- Coordinates: 33°32′10″N 94°41′17″W
- Country: United States
- State: Texas
- County: Bowie
- Elevation: 427 ft (130 m)
- Time zone: UTC-6 (Central (CST))
  - Summer (DST): UTC-5 (CDT)
- Area codes: 903 & 430
- GNIS feature ID: 1364265

Oak Grove, also known as Rolyat, is an unincorporated community in Bowie County, Texas, United States. According to the Handbook of Texas, the community had a population of 294 in 2000. It is located within the Texarkana metropolitan area.

== History ==
A post office was opened in 1893 under the name Rolyat, but changed to Oak Grove in 1906 due to the oak trees nearby. Two hundred people were living in the community in 1914 but the total plunged to 80 in 1925. The post office closed in the 1950s. Its population was 60 as of 1982 and the community had no businesses. In 2000, 294 residents lived in Oak Grove.

== Geography ==
Oak Grove is located on U.S. Route 82 and the Missouri Pacific Railroad line, some 4.5 mi (7.2 km) west of DeKalb in northwestern Bowie County. It is also located 21 mi (34 km) east of Clarksville, 17 mi (27 km) west of New Boston, and 40 mi (64 km) west of Texarkana.

== Education ==
Oak Grove is served by the Dekalb Independent School District.
