= Liberty-Eylau =

Liberty-Eylau may refer to:

- Liberty-Eylau Independent School District
- Liberty-Eylau High School
- Eylau, Texas
