= James Bowie High School (Simms, Texas) =

Location
- 47 James Bowie Lane; Simms, Bowie County, Texas 75574; United States; 33.349013°N 94.506310°W

Information
- School type: Public, high school
- Locale: Rural: Distant
- School district: Simms ISD
- NCES School ID: 484032004567
- Principal: Christopher McClure
- Teaching staff: 18.66 (on an FTE basis)
- Grades: 9‍–‍12
- Enrollment: 154 (2023‍–‍2024)
- Student to teacher ratio: 8.25
- Color
- Team name: Pirates
- Website: Official website

James Bowie High School, also known as Bowie High School, is a public high school located in Simms, Texas. It is the sole high school in the Simms Independent School District and is classified as a 2A school by the University Interscholastic League. During 2022‍–‍2023, Bowie High School had an enrollment of 140 students and a student to teacher ratio of 7.10. The school received an overall rating of "A" from the Texas Education Agency for the 2024‍–‍2025 school year

== Athletics ==
The Bowie Pirates compete in the following sports:

- Baseball
- Basketball
- Cross Country
- Football
- Golf
- Powerlifting
- Softball
- Tennis
- Track and Field
- Volleyball
