= Darden, Texas =

- Ghost town
- Location within Texas Location within the United States
- Coordinates: 33°18′0.43″N 94°34′52″W
- Country: United States
- State: Texas
- County: Bowie
- Elevation: 279 ft (85 m)
- Time zone: UTC-6 (Central (CST))
  - Summer (DST): UTC-5 (CDT)
- Area codes: 430 & 903
- GNIS feature ID: 1380838

Darden is a ghost town in Bowie County, Texas, United States.

== History ==
Darden was originally called Brownstone for Randolph H. Brown and was established on the St. Louis Southwestern Railway in the late 1890s.

== Geography ==
Darden was located off U.S. Highway 67, 15 mi (24 km) southwest of Boston in southwestern Bosque County. It lies in the low hills of the Sulphur Fork of the Red River. Bassett is also located 2 mi (3.2 km) northeast of Darden.

== Education ==
Darden is located within the Simms Independent School District.
