= Dalby Springs, Texas =

Unincorporated community in Bowie County, Texas, United States

- Unincorporated community
- Location within Texas Location within the United States
- Coordinates: 33°22′08″N 94°40′47″W
- Country: United States
- State: Texas
- County: Bowie
- Elevation: 312 ft (95 m)
- Time zone: UTC-6 (Central (CST))
  - Summer (DST): UTC-5 (CDT)
- Area codes: 903 & 430
- GNIS feature ID: 1379631

Dalby Springs is a small unincorporated community in Bowie County, Texas, United States. According to the Handbook of Texas, the community had a population of 141 in 2000. It is located within the Texarkana metropolitan area.

== History ==
The community was named for its nearby hot springs. Dalby Springs was first settled around 1839 when Warren Dalby and his family came to the area and became a town around 1856 when the springs were said to have "medicinal properties", causing people to come to the area to drink the water. A post office was established at Dalby Springs in 1860, with Joseph G. Dalby as the postmaster. There were other buildings to accommodate travelers in the area. There were 250 residents in the community served by a church, five mills, and five gins in 1884. A newspaper called the Guest was established in the 1890s. Its population fell to 186 by the start of the 20th century and remained around that level until it plunged to 50 in the 1950s. It went up to 60 in 1984, but there were no businesses in operation. Its population was 141 in 1990 and 2000.

== Geography ==
Dalby Springs is located on Farm to Market Road 561 off US Highway 259, 12 mi (19 km) south of DeKalb and 16 mi (26 km) southwest of New Boston in southwestern Bowie County.

== Education ==
Dalby Springs had its own school in 1884. Today, the community is served by the DeKalb Independent School District.

== See also ==
- List of unincorporated communities in Texas
