= Nash, Texas =

- City
- Logo

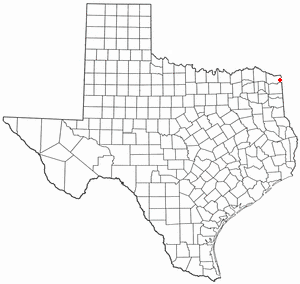
- Location of Nash, Texas

- Coordinates: 33°26′32″N 94°07′31″W
- Country: United States
- State: Texas
- County: Bowie

Government
  - Type: Council-Manager

Area
  - Total: 4.48 sq mi (11.61 km^{2})
  - Land: 4.47 sq mi (11.59 km^{2})
  - Water: 0.0077 sq mi (0.02 km^{2})
- Elevation: 361 ft (110 m)

Population (2020)
  - Total: 3,814
  - Density: 855.2/sq mi (330.19/km^{2})
- Time zone: UTC-6 (Central (CST))
  - Summer (DST): UTC-5 (CDT)
- ZIP code: 75569
- Area codes: 903, 430
- FIPS code: 48-50352
- GNIS feature ID: 2411213
- Website: nashtx.org

Nash is a city in Bowie County, Texas, United States, and a suburb of Texarkana. It is part of the Texarkana metropolitan area. The population was 2,960 at the 2010 census, up from 2,169 at the 2000 census. In 2020, its population was 3,814, representing continued population growth as a suburban community.

== History ==
=== Early years ===
Long before the birth of Nash, the land on which it is located was in the name of the State of Texas. The State of Texas patented the land which makes up the eastern portion of Nash to William Crutcher on December 19, 1849. The west portion of Nash was patented to Josiah W. Fort, assignee of Thomas Price on December 18, 1951.

=== Growth period ===
Originally, the town of Nash was first called "T. C. Junction" or sometimes Texarkana Junction for its location on the transcontinental division of the Texas and Pacific Railway, which officially was entitled from its construction days as the Trans-Continental Division. The first railroad track was built from Marshall eastward to T.C. Junction in 1873. The official origin date of the town is unknown, but records indicate Nash began sometime between 1873 and the late 1880s.

In 1884, the town was renamed "Park", after Dr. John N. Parker, who received a grant for a post office. He was the first postmaster. Dr. Parker changed the name of the town to "Park" because the government would not accept such a long name as Trans-Continental Junction; therefore, he used his own name dropping the "er". In 1906, the town was renamed again to "Nash", in honor of Martin Manny Nash, the Division Superintendent for the Texas & Pacific Railroad Company.

The first school started in 1885, in a single room by Dr. K. M. Kelley, located on the corner of Dodd and Elm streets. In 1890, the town had a store, a pharmacy, two mills, a cotton gin, and 100 inhabitants. In 1894, the town was struck by a cyclone that destroyed one-third of the town, demolishing the first school, the Methodist church, the Baptist Church, several dwellings, and killing two people.

The town of Nash has two cemeteries. The oldest one, referred to as the Handley or Blocker Cemetery, dates back to 1876. This cemetery is the burial place of two Confederate soldiers of the Confederate "army:" T.P. Wagnon, Pvt Co. E. Ragsdale Battn. Cav., and James Bentley, Co. B. 41st Alabama Regiment, who was with Robert E. Lee when he surrendered. The Nash Cemetery, the second oldest cemetery, is the burial place of the following Confederate soldiers: Joshua R. Brower, A.J. Herrington, Ruben L. Redden, George R. Robinson, George W. Simpson, William G. Blocker, Pvt Co. G. Third Regiment Alabama, and John King.

During the 1950s, the town was incorporated and began to grow again. In 1980, many Nash residents were employed either in Texarkana or at one of two nearby military installations: Red River Army Depot and Lone Star Army Ammunition Plant, located a few miles west of the town. The population was 2,169 in 2000.

== Geography ==
Nash is located in eastern Bowie County occupying the area surrounding the intersection of Farm to Market Road 989 (Kings Highway) and U.S. Route 82 (New Boston Road). Nash is bordered to the north and east by the city of Texarkana and to the south by the city of Wake Village. Interstate 30 forms the northern boundary of Nash, with access from Exit 218.

According to the United States Census Bureau, the city has a total area of 3.4 square miles (8.8 km^{2}), of which 0.012 square miles (0.03 km^{2}), or 0.34%, is water.

=== Climate ===
- The warmest month is either July or August.
- The highest recorded temperature was 108 °F in September 2000.
- On average, the coolest month is January.
- The lowest recorded temperature was –6 °F in 1989.
- The most precipitation on average occurs in November.

Climate data for Nash, Texas
Month	Jan	Feb	Mar	Apr	May	Jun	Jul	Aug	Sep	Oct	Nov	Dec	Year
Record high °C (°F)	27 (81)	32 (90)	32 (89)	35 (95)	37 (98)	38 (101)	41 (105)	41 (106)	42 (108)	35 (95)	30 (86)	27 (80)	42 (108)
Mean daily maximum °C (°F)	12 (53)	14 (58)	19 (67)	24 (75)	28 (82)	32 (89)	34 (93)	34 (93)	30 (86)	25 (77)	18 (64)	13 (55)	24 (74)
Daily mean °C (°F)	6 (42)	8 (46)	12 (54)	17 (62)	22 (71)	26 (79)	28 (83)	28 (82)	24 (75)	18 (64)	12 (53)	7 (44)	17 (63)
Mean daily minimum °C (°F)	−1 (31)	1 (34)	6 (42)	10 (50)	16 (60)	20 (68)	22 (72)	22 (71)	18 (64)	11 (52)	5 (41)	1 (33)	11 (52)
Record low °C (°F)	−16 (3)	−13 (8)	−9 (15)	−2 (28)	4 (40)	11 (52)	14 (57)	13 (55)	3 (38)	−3 (27)	−9 (16)	−21 (−6)	−21 (−6)
Average precipitation mm (inches)	99.3 (3.91)	96.5 (3.80)	113.3 (4.46)	107.4 (4.23)	126.2 (4.97)	122.4 (4.82)	91.9 (3.62)	61.2 (2.41)	95.8 (3.77)	117.1 (4.61)	144.5 (5.69)	125.7 (4.95)	1,301.3 (51.24)
Source: The Weather Channel

== Demographics ==
Historical population
Census	Pop.	Note	%±
1960	1,124		—
1970	1,961		74.5%
1980	2,022		3.1%
1990	2,162		6.9%
2000	2,169		0.3%
2010	2,960		36.5%
2020	3,814		28.9%
U.S. Decennial Census

=== 2020 census ===
As of the 2020 census, Nash had a population of 3,814. The median age was 34.6 years. 25.6% of residents were under the age of 18 and 14.3% of residents were 65 years of age or older. For every 100 females there were 86.2 males, and for every 100 females age 18 and over there were 81.3 males age 18 and over.

94.8% of residents lived in urban areas, while 5.2% lived in rural areas.

There were 1,577 households in Nash, of which 35.6% had children under the age of 18 living in them. Of all households, 33.9% were married-couple households, 18.8% were households with a male householder and no spouse or partner present, and 39.6% were households with a female householder and no spouse or partner present. About 31.6% of all households were made up of individuals and 12.9% had someone living alone who was 65 years of age or older.

There were 1,691 housing units, of which 6.7% were vacant. The homeowner vacancy rate was 2.5% and the rental vacancy rate was 6.4%.

The redistricting data indicate that non-Hispanic whites (50.7%) and African Americans (29.6%) remained the largest racial groups in the city.

Racial composition as of the 2020 census
Race	Number	Percent
White	1,933	50.7%
Black or African American	1,128	29.6%
American Indian and Alaska Native	38	1.0%
Asian	37	1.0%
Native Hawaiian and Other Pacific Islander	5	0.1%
Some other race	355	9.3%
Two or more races	318	8.3%
Hispanic or Latino (of any race)	619	16.2%

=== 2000 census ===
At the census of 2000, there were 2,169 people, 891 households, and 603 families residing in the city. The population density was 768.4 inhabitants per square mile (296.7/km^{2}). There were 1,003 housing units at an average density of 355.3 units per square mile (137.2 units/km^{2}). The racial makeup of the city was 77.87% White, 17.57% African American, 0.92% Native American, 0.32% Asian, 2.67% from other races, and 0.65% from two or more races. Hispanic or Latino of any race were 3.83% of the population.

In 2000, the median income for a household in the city was $27,614, and the median income for a family was $33,869. Males had a median income of $28,056 versus $22,528 for females. The per capita income for the city was $15,571. About 12.9% of families and 14.8% of the population were below the poverty line, including 17.4% of those under age 18 and 15.0% of those age 65 or over.

=== American Community Survey ===
In 2020, the American Community Survey's estimates program determined the median household income was $37,750. The city had a mean household income of $67,654.

== Education ==
Nash is served by the Texarkana Independent School District.

The zoned elementary school is Nash Elementary School. The secondary schools for all of TISD are Texas Middle School and Texas High School.

== Notable person ==
- Rick Minter, football coach
