= Red Bank, Texas =

- Unincorporated community
- Location within Texas Location within the United States
- Coordinates: 33°31′31″N 94°14′34″W
- Country: United States
- State: Texas
- County: Bowie
- Elevation: 322 ft (98 m)
- Time zone: UTC-6 (Central (CST))
  - Summer (DST): UTC-5 (CDT)
- Area codes: 903 & 430
- GNIS feature ID: 2034796

Red Bank, or Redbank, is an unincorporated town in Bowie County, Texas, United States. According to the Handbook of Texas, the community had a population of 125 in 2000. It is part of the Texarkana metropolitan area.

== History ==
Red Bank was first settled between 1830 and 1845 and was named for the red soil in the area. In 1901, the post office was established but closed a year later, with James Hubbard as the postmaster. By the 1980s, Red Bank had a church, two businesses, two cemeteries, and several scattered houses.

== Geography ==
Red Bank is located at the intersections of Farm to Market Road 1398 (FM 1398), County Road 2109 (CR 2109), and CR 2212, about 10 miles (16 km) northeast of the county seat of New Boston, 15.8 mi (25.4 km) northwest of Texarkana, and 6.4 mi (10.3 km) north of Victory City.

== Education ==
The Hooks Independent School District serves students in Redbank.
