= Bassett, Texas =

Unincorporated community in Bowie County, Texas, United States

Bassett
- Unincorporated community
- Location within Texas Location within the United States
- Coordinates: 33°19′00″N 94°33′40″W
- Country: United States
- State: Texas
- County: Bowie
- Elevation: 269 ft (82 m)
- Time zone: UTC-6 (Central (CST))
  - Summer (DST): UTC-5 (CDT)
- Area codes: 903 & 430
- GNIS feature ID: 1372411

Bassett is an unincorporated community in Bowie County, Texas, United States. According to the Handbook of Texas, the community had a population of 373 in 2000. It is located within the Texarkana metropolitan area.

== Geography ==
Bassett is located on the St. Louis Southwestern Railway, 14 mi (23 km) south of DeKalb and 33 mi (53 km) southwest of Texarkana on U.S. Highway 67 in southwestern Bowie County.

== Education ==
Bassett is served by the Simms Independent School District.

== See also ==
- List of unincorporated communities in Texas
