= South Texarkana, Texas =

- Unincorporated community
- Location within Texas Location within the United States
- Coordinates: 33°24′8″N 94°2′35″W
- Country: United States
- State: Texas
- County: Bowie
- Elevation: 331 ft (101 m)
- Time zone: UTC-6 (Central (CST))
  - Summer (DST): UTC-5 (CDT)
- Area codes: 903 & 430
- GNIS feature ID: 1368785

South Texarkana is an unincorporated community in Bowie County, in the U.S. state of Texas. According to the Handbook of Texas, the community had a population of 370 in 2000. It is located within the Texarkana metropolitan area.

== History ==
The area grew up sometime after 1900 and was incorporated in the middle of the decade. Its population was 316 in 1952 and grew to 370 from 1992 through 2000.

== Geography ==
South Texarkana is located off of Farm to Market Road 558, just south of Texarkana in eastern Bowie County.

== Education ==
South Texarkana is served by the Texarkana Independent School District.
