= Wake Village, Texas =

- City
- Logo

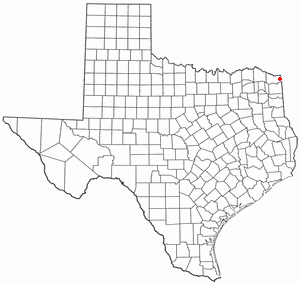
- Location of Wake Village, Texas

- Coordinates: 33°25′27″N 94°07′16″W
- Country: United States
- State: Texas
- County: Bowie

Area
  - Total: 2.99 sq mi (7.75 km^{2})
  - Land: 2.99 sq mi (7.75 km^{2})
  - Water: 0 sq mi (0.00 km^{2})
- Elevation: 351 ft (107 m)

Population (2020)
  - Total: 5,945
  - Density: 1,779.2/sq mi (686.96/km^{2})
- Time zone: UTC-6 (Central (CST))
  - Summer (DST): UTC-5 (CDT)
- ZIP code: 75501
- Area codes: 903, 430
- FIPS code: 48-76096
- GNIS feature ID: 2412166
- Website: www.cityofwakevillage.com

Wake Village is a city in Bowie County, Texas, United States, and a suburb of Texarkana, Texas. It is part of the Texarkana metropolitan area. The population was 5,945 at the 2020 census.

== History ==
Wake Village was founded in 1944 for the war effort to provide housing for the plant workers at the Red River Army Depot and the Lone Star Army Ammunition Plant.

The name was taken from Wake Island, in the Pacific theater of the war. The population was over 1,000 in the early 1950s; in the early 1990s it had reached 4,400, and the 2000 census reported 5,129. The sections of Wake Village in which the original post-war homes exist are named WWII-related names, i.e. Manila, Guam, Singapore, Arizona, Burma Victory, etc. The 1950s mid-century modern home enclaves feature names such as Esther and Marianna.

== Geography ==
Wake Village is located in eastern Bowie County immediately west of Texarkana, at the intersection of Farm to Market Road 989 and Old Redwater Road, north of U.S. Route 67 and south of U.S. Route 82. The city of Nash is situated immediately to the north, also along FM 989.

According to the United States Census Bureau, the city has a total area of 2.3 square miles (6.0 km^{2}), all land.

== Demographics ==
Historical population
Census	Pop.	Note	%±
1950	1,066		—
1960	1,140		6.9%
1970	2,408		111.2%
1980	3,865		60.5%
1990	4,757		23.1%
2000	5,129		7.8%
2010	5,492		7.1%
2020	5,945		8.2%
U.S. Decennial Census

=== 2020 census ===
As of the 2020 census, Wake Village had a population of 5,945. The median age was 37.2 years. 25.1% of residents were under the age of 18 and 16.9% of residents were 65 years of age or older. For every 100 females there were 86.6 males, and for every 100 females age 18 and over there were 83.0 males age 18 and over. 95.0% of residents lived in urban areas, while 5.0% lived in rural areas. There were 2,372 households and 1,478 families in Wake Village; 33.8% of households had children under the age of 18 living in them. Of all households, 46.7% were married-couple households, 15.8% were households with a male householder and no spouse or partner present, and 31.7% were households with a female householder and no spouse or partner present. About 26.9% of all households were made up of individuals and 10.0% had someone living alone who was 65 years of age or older. There were 2,489 housing units, of which 4.7% were vacant. The homeowner vacancy rate was 1.9% and the rental vacancy rate was 5.5%.

Racial composition as of the 2020 census
Race	Number	Percent
White	3,651	61.4%
Black or African American	1,579	26.6%
American Indian and Alaska Native	54	0.9%
Asian	49	0.8%
Native Hawaiian and Other Pacific Islander	0	0.0%
Some other race	189	3.2%
Two or more races	423	7.1%
Hispanic or Latino (of any race)	406	6.8%

=== 2000 census ===
As of the 2000 census, there were 5,129 people, 2,042 households, and 1,511 families residing in the city. The population density was 3,092.9 inhabitants per square mile (1,194.2/km^{2}). There were 2,198 housing units at an average density of 1,325.4 per square mile (511.7/km^{2}). The racial makeup of the city was 82.76% White, 14.19% African American, 0.92% Native American, 0.47% Asian, 0.04% Pacific Islander, 0.96% from other races, and 0.66% from two or more races. Hispanic or Latino of any race were 3.18% of the population.

There were 2,042 households, out of which 34.4% had children under the age of 18 living with them, 58.7% were married couples living together, 12.1% had a female householder with no husband present, and 26.0% were non-families. 23.3% of all households were made up of individuals, and 8.2% had someone living alone who was 65 years of age or older. The average household size was 2.51 and the average family size was 2.94.

In the city, the population was spread out, with 25.8% under the age of 18, 8.4% from 18 to 24, 30.0% from 25 to 44, 22.7% from 45 to 64, and 13.0% who were 65 years of age or older. The median age was 36 years. For every 100 females, there were 90.7 males. For every 100 females age 18 and over, there were 87.3 males.

The median income for a household in the city was $39,961, and the median income for a family was $47,474. Males had a median income of $32,486 versus $20,648 for females. The per capita income for the city was $18,447. About 8.3% of families and 12.2% of the population were below the poverty line, including 19.8% of those under age 18 and 10.1% of those age 65 or over.

== Education ==
It is in the Texarkana Independent School District.

The zoned elementary school for the majority of Wake Village is Wake Village Elementary School. Small sections are zoned to Nash Elementary School. The secondary schools for all of TISD are Texas Middle School and Texas High School.
