= Hartman, Texas =

- Ghost town
- Location within Texas Location within the United States
- Coordinates: 33°22′42″N 94°10′07″W
- Country: United States
- State: Texas
- County: Bowie
- Elevation: 289 ft (88 m)
- Time zone: UTC-6 (Central (CST))
  - Summer (DST): UTC-5 (CDT)
- Area codes: 430 & 903
- GNIS feature ID: 1379902

Hartman is a ghost town in Bowie County, Texas, United States.

== History ==
In its brief history, Hartman had only a church and a sawmill in the 1930s then disappeared in 1984.

== Geography ==
Hartman is located on Farm to Market Road 2148, 7.7 miles (12.4 km) west-southwest of Texarkana on the St. Louis Southwestern Railway.

== Education ==
Hartman had its own school in the 1930s. Today, the ghost town is located within the Liberty-Eylau Independent School District.
