= Liberty-Eylau High School =

Location
- 2905 Leopard Drive; Texarkana, Bowie County, Texas 75501; United States; 33.3899°N 94.0886°W

Information
- School type: Public high school
- Locale: City: Small
- School district: Liberty-Eylau ISD
- NCES School ID: 482739003079
- Principal: William Thompson
- Teaching staff: 64.85 (FTE)
- Grades: 9‍–‍12
- Enrollment: 543 (2024‍–‍2025)
- Student to teacher ratio: 8.37
- Colors: Cardinal and white
- Athletics conference: UIL Class AAA
- Mascot: Leopard
- Website: Liberty-Eylau High School

Liberty-Eylau High School is a public high school located in Texarkana, Texas near the unincorporated town of Eylau and classified as a 3A school by the University Interscholastic League. It is part of the Liberty-Eylau Independent School District located in southeastern Bowie County. During 2022‍–‍2023, Liberty-Eylau High School had an enrollment of 532 students and a student to teacher ratio of 7.41. The school received an overall rating of "D" from the Texas Education Agency for the 2024‍–‍2025 school year

== Campus ==
The High School campus is divided into 2 parts, East Campus (9-10), and West Campus (11-12). A major addition was added to the campus in 2004, a multipurpose building entitled the Rader Dome, named after Don Rader. The Rader Dome is home to many volleyball and basketball games.

== Athletics ==
The Liberty-Eylau Leopards compete in these sports:

- Baseball
- Basketball
- Cross Country
- Football
- Golf
- Powerlifting
- Softball
- Tennis
- Track and Field
- Volleyball

=== State titles ===
- Baseball -
  - 2006(3A), 2024(4A)
- Football -
  - 1999(3A), 2006(3A)
- Girls Basketball -
  - 2010(3A)
- Girls Track -
  - 2010(3A), 2011(3A)

== Notable alumni ==
- Melvin Bunch, former Kansas City Royals and Seattle Mariners pitcher
- Tra Carson, former NFL running back for multiple teams
- Marqueston Huff, former NFL defensive back for multiple teams
- LaMichael James, Heisman Trophy finalist in 2010, played for NFL's San Francisco 49ers, Miami Dolphins
- Brandon Jones, former NFL wide receiver for multiple teams
- Jarrion Lawson, sprinter and long jumper, 3-time NCAA champion at Arkansas in 2016, silver medalist at 2017 World Championships
- Ramos McDonald, former Minnesota Vikings cornerback
- Will Middlebrooks, former MLB standout for the Boston Red Sox
- Willie Teal, former LSU and Minnesota Vikings cornerback
- Byron Williams, former New York Giants wide receiver
