= Siloam, Texas =

- Unincorporated community
- Location within Texas Location within the United States
- Coordinates: 33°21′48″N 94°34′24″W
- Country: United States
- State: Texas
- County: Bowie
- Elevation: 322 ft (98 m)
- Time zone: UTC-6 (Central (CST))
  - Summer (DST): UTC-5 (CDT)
- Area codes: 903 & 430
- GNIS feature ID: 1380921

Siloam is an unincorporated community in Bowie County, in the U.S. state of Texas. According to the Handbook of Texas, the community had a population of 50 in 2000. It is located within the Texarkana metropolitan area.

== History ==
Siloam was settled sometime before the American Civil War. A post office was established at Siloam in 1895 and remained in operation until 1907. The locals were farmers and lumberjacks. Its population ranged from 38 in 1910, 75 from 1933 to 1964, and 50 from 1982 through 2000 with no businesses.

== Geography ==
Siloam is located 4 mi (6.4 km) northwest of Simms in southwestern Bowie County.

== Education ==
Siloam is served by the Simms Independent School District.
