= Almont, Texas =

Ghost town in Texas, US

Almont
- Ghost town
- Location in Texas
- Coordinates: 33.59761610°N 94.49659410°W
- Country: United States
- State: Texas
- County: Bowie

Almont is a ghost town in Bowie County, Texas, United States. Established in the 19th century, it was named for Almont Hill. A post office operated there from 1893 to 1904. At its peak in 1896, its population was 26. It was abandoned by the 1980s.
