= Pleasant Grove Independent School District =

Pleasant Grove Independent School District may refer to the following school districts in Texas, United States:

- Pleasant Grove Independent School District (Bowie County, Texas)
- Pleasant Grove Independent School District (Dallas County, Texas), now part of Dallas Independent School District
