= Sulphur, Texas =

Sulphur, Texas may refer to the following places in Texas:

- Sulphur, Bowie County, Texas
- Sulphur, Trinity County, Texas
