= Sulphur, Bowie County, Texas =

Sulphur, Texas
- Ghost town
- Location within Texas Location within the United States
- Coordinates: 33°18′46″N 94°03′21″W
- Country: United States
- State: Texas
- County: Bowie
- Elevation: 236 ft (72 m)
- Time zone: UTC-6 (Central (CST))
  - Summer (DST): UTC-5 (CDT)
- Area codes: 430 & 903
- GNIS feature ID: 1384147

Sulphur is a ghost town in Bowie County, Texas, United States.

== History ==
Sulphur may have been settled when the Texas Pacific Railway was built through the area in the 1870s. A post office was established at Sulphur in 1874 and remained in operation until 1899, with L.C. Leeds as postmaster. Its name was changed to Sulphur Station. It had a gristmill and three mills for lumber, shingles, and planing in 1884 and reported a population of 300. It went down to 100 from 1890 to 1896. There were a few scattered houses in Sulphur in 1936 and was only referred to as Sulphur. It may have been the site of another post office from 1903 to 1904. The community disappeared in 1984.

== Geography ==
Sulphur was on the eastern end of the Missouri Pacific Railroad and the Sulphur River, 10 miles (16 km) south of Texarkana.

== Education ==
Sulphur is located within the Liberty-Eylau Independent School District.
