= Burns, Texas =

- Unincorporated community
- Location within Texas Location within the United States
- Coordinates: 33°31′05″N 94°17′21″W
- Country: United States
- State: Texas
- County: Bowie
- Elevation: 331 ft (101 m)
- Time zone: UTC-6 (Central (CST))
  - Summer (DST): UTC-5 (CDT)
- Area codes: 903 & 430
- GNIS feature ID: 1353352

Burns is an unincorporated community in Bowie County, in the U.S. state of Texas. According to the Handbook of Texas, the community had a population of 400 in 2000. It is located within the Texarkana metropolitan area.

== History ==
Burns was most likely named for a family surnamed Burns and had a population of 400 in 2000.

== Geography ==
Burns is located along Farm to Market Road 560, 14 mi (23 km) northwest of Texarkana in northwestern Bowie County.

== Education ==
Burns had a school for black children at one point. Today, the community is served by the Hooks Independent School District.
