= Carbondale, Texas =

- Unincorporated community
- Location within Texas Location within the United States
- Coordinates: 33°18′54″N 94°26′29″W
- Country: United States
- State: Texas
- County: Bowie
- Elevation: 256 ft (78 m)
- Time zone: UTC-6 (Central (CST))
  - Summer (DST): UTC-5 (CDT)
- Area codes: 903 & 430
- GNIS feature ID: 1380824

Carbondale is an unincorporated community in Bowie County, in the U.S. state of Texas. According to the Handbook of Texas, the community had a population of 30 in 2000. It is located within the Texarkana metropolitan area.

== History ==
Carbondale was named for the coal deposits in the area. A post office was established at Carbondale in 1907 and remained in operation until the 1950s. Its population was 35 in 1925 and lost five residents from 1982 through 2000, with no businesses.

== Geography ==
Carbondale is located on the St. Louis Southwestern Railway, 10 mi (16 km) south of Boston in southern Bowie County.

== Education ==
Today, the community is served by the Simms Independent School District.
