= Marqueston Huff =

American football player (born 1992)

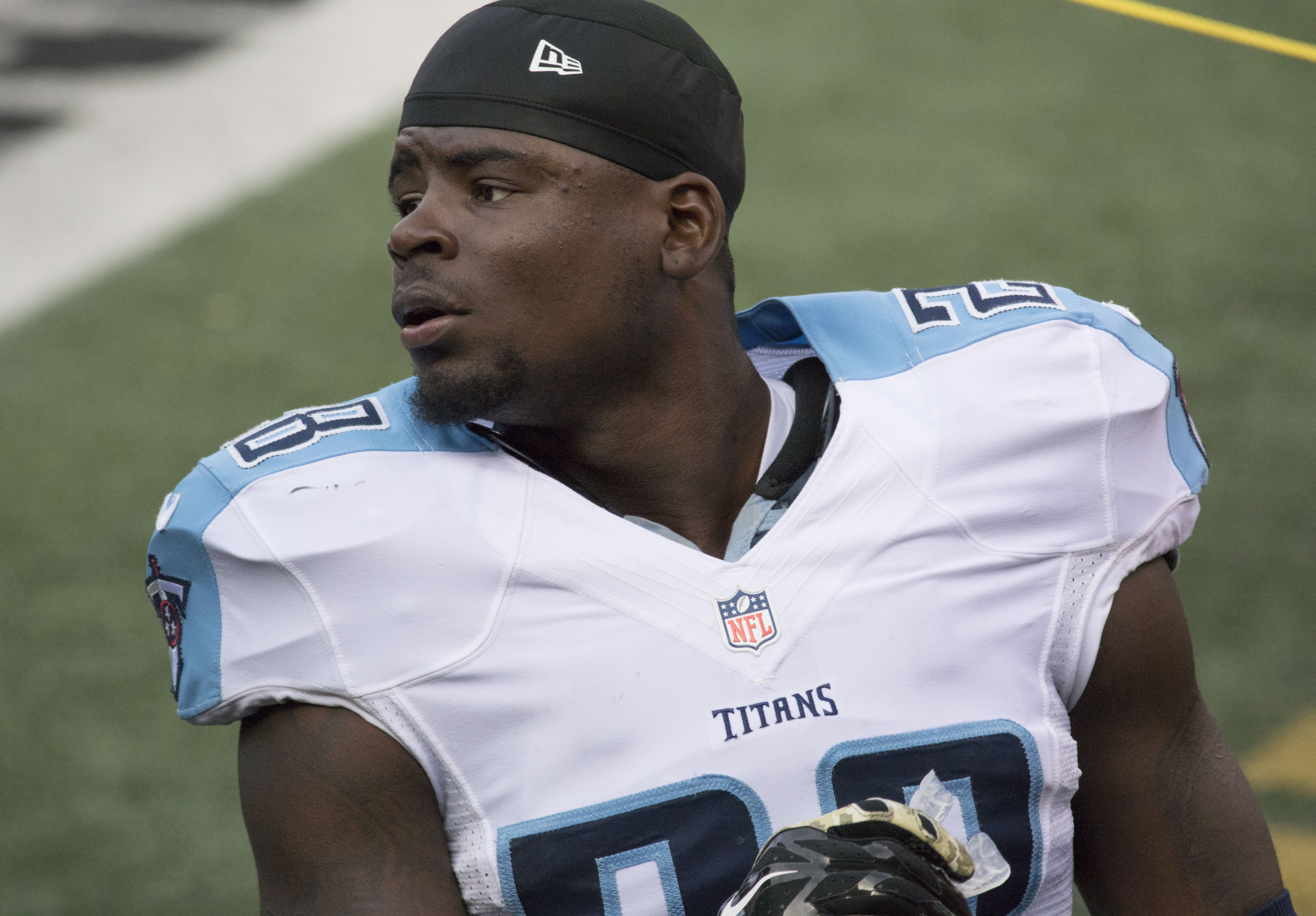
- Huff with the Tennessee Titans in 2014

No. 28, 42, 20
- Position: Safety

Personal information
- Born: April 6, 1992 (age 34); Salinas, California, U.S.
- Listed height: 5 ft 11 in (1.80 m)
- Listed weight: 205 lb (93 kg)

Career information
- High school: Liberty-Eylau (Texarkana, Texas)
- College: Wyoming
- NFL draft: 2014: 4th round, 122nd overall pick

Career history
- Tennessee Titans (2014–2015); Jacksonville Jaguars (2016); Baltimore Ravens (2016); Kansas City Chiefs (2017)*; Tampa Bay Buccaneers (2017)*; Dallas Cowboys (2018); Houston Roughnecks (2020)
- * Offseason or practice squad member only

Awards and highlights
- Second–team All–Mountain West (2013)

Career NFL statistics
- Total tackles: 36
- Sacks: 1
- Fumble recoveries: 1
- Interceptions: 1
- Defensive touchdowns: 1
- Stats at Pro Football Reference

Marqueston Devonte Huff (born April 6, 1992), also known by his nickname "Quest", is an American former professional football player who was a safety in the National Football League (NFL). He played college football for the Wyoming Cowboys and was selected by the Tennessee Titans in the fourth round of the 2014 NFL draft. He was also a member of the Jacksonville Jaguars, Baltimore Ravens, Kansas City Chiefs, Tampa Bay Buccaneers, Dallas Cowboys, and Houston Roughnecks.

== Early life ==
Huff attended Liberty-Eylau High School. As a junior, he tallied 53 tackles, 2 interceptions, one forced fumble and 2 blocked field goals, while receiving All-district honors.

As a senior, he registered 85 tackles, 3 interceptions, 3 forced fumbles, one fumble recovery and one blocked one punt. He received All-Northeast Texas and All-district honors.

As a junior, he was named All-state in track and field as a sprinter and high jumper.

== College career ==
Huff accepted a football scholarship from the University of Wyoming. As a freshman, he played in all 12 games as a nickel back and on special teams. He made 18 tackles, one interception and one pass defensed.

As a sophomore, he was named a starter at cornerback. He registered 47 tackles (2.5 for loss), 3 interceptions (led the team), 2 passes defensed and 3 fumble recoveries. He had 2 fumble returns of 8 and 48 yards for touchdowns.

As a junior, he posted 57 tackles (1.5 for loss), 7 passes defensed (second on the team), 2 forced fumbles, one fumble recovery and one blocked kick. He had 10 tackles against the University of Idaho.

As a senior, he was switched to free safety and was named a team captain. He started all 12 games, collecting 127 tackles (third in the conference), 2 interceptions, one forced fumble, 2 fumbles recoveries and 6 passes defensed. He had 20 tackles against Utah State University, tying him for the third best single-game performance in school history. He had 18 tackles, one pass defensed and one forced fumble against Nebraska.

=== Statistics ===
Season	G	Solo	Asst.	Total	TFL/YDS	FF	FR	P Defl	Int
2010	12	9	9	18	-	-	-	1	1
2011	13	27	20	47	2.5/5	-	3	2	
2012	12	30	27	57	1.5/2	2	1	7	-
2013	12	74	53	127	3.0/6	1	2	6	2
Total	49	140	109	249	7.0/13	3	6	16	6

== Professional career ==
=== Pre-draft ===
After completing four years at Wyoming, Huff decided to enter the NFL draft.

Pre-draft measurables
Height	Weight	Arm length	Hand span	Wingspan	40-yard dash	10-yard split	20-yard split	20-yard shuttle	Three-cone drill	Vertical jump	Broad jump	Bench press
5 ft 11 1/8 in (1.81 m)	196 lb (89 kg)	31 3/8 in (0.80 m)	9 in (0.23 m)	6 ft 3 1/8 in (1.91 m)	4.49 s	1.54 s	2.61 s	4.19 s	7.26 s	35.5 in (0.90 m)	9 ft 10 in (3.00 m)	15 reps
All values from NFL Combine

=== Tennessee Titans ===
Huff was selected by the Tennessee Titans in the fourth round (122nd overall) of the 2014 NFL draft. One of the reasons the Titans selected Huff is because he is versatile, and can play at either the safety position or at cornerback. In Week 14, Huff recorded his first interception against Eli Manning and the New York Giants, which he returned for a 23-yard touchdown. He appeared in 14 games, collecting 18 tackles, one sack, one interception (returned for a touchdown) and 2 passes defensed.

In 2015, he appeared in 16 games, making 15 tackles and 2 passes defensed On September 2, Huff was released by the Titans as part of final roster cuts.

=== Jacksonville Jaguars ===
The Jacksonville Jaguars claimed Huff off waivers on September 4, 2016. He was released by the team on September 13, and was re-signed to the team's practice squad the next day.

=== Baltimore Ravens ===
On October 6, 2016, Huff was signed by the Baltimore Ravens off of the Jaguars' practice squad. He appeared in 11 games as a backup.

=== Kansas City Chiefs ===
Huff signed with the Kansas City Chiefs on March 16, 2017. He was waived by the Chiefs on July 6.

=== Tampa Bay Buccaneers ===
On July 30, 2017, Huff signed with the Tampa Bay Buccaneers. He was waived by the Buccaneers on September 2.

=== Dallas Cowboys ===
On January 10, 2018, Huff signed a reserve/future contract with the Dallas Cowboys. He was waived/injured on September 1, and was placed on injured reserve with a groin injury. On March 29, 2019, the Cowboys released Huff.

=== Houston Roughnecks ===
Huff was selected by the Houston Roughnecks of the XFL in the fourth round during phase 4 in the 2020 XFL draft. In March, amid the COVID-19 pandemic, the league announced that it would be cancelling the rest of the season. Playing in all 5 games, he registered 20 tackles and no interceptions. He had his contract terminated when the league suspended operations on April 10, 2020.
