= Bowie County, Texas =

County in Texas, United States

- County
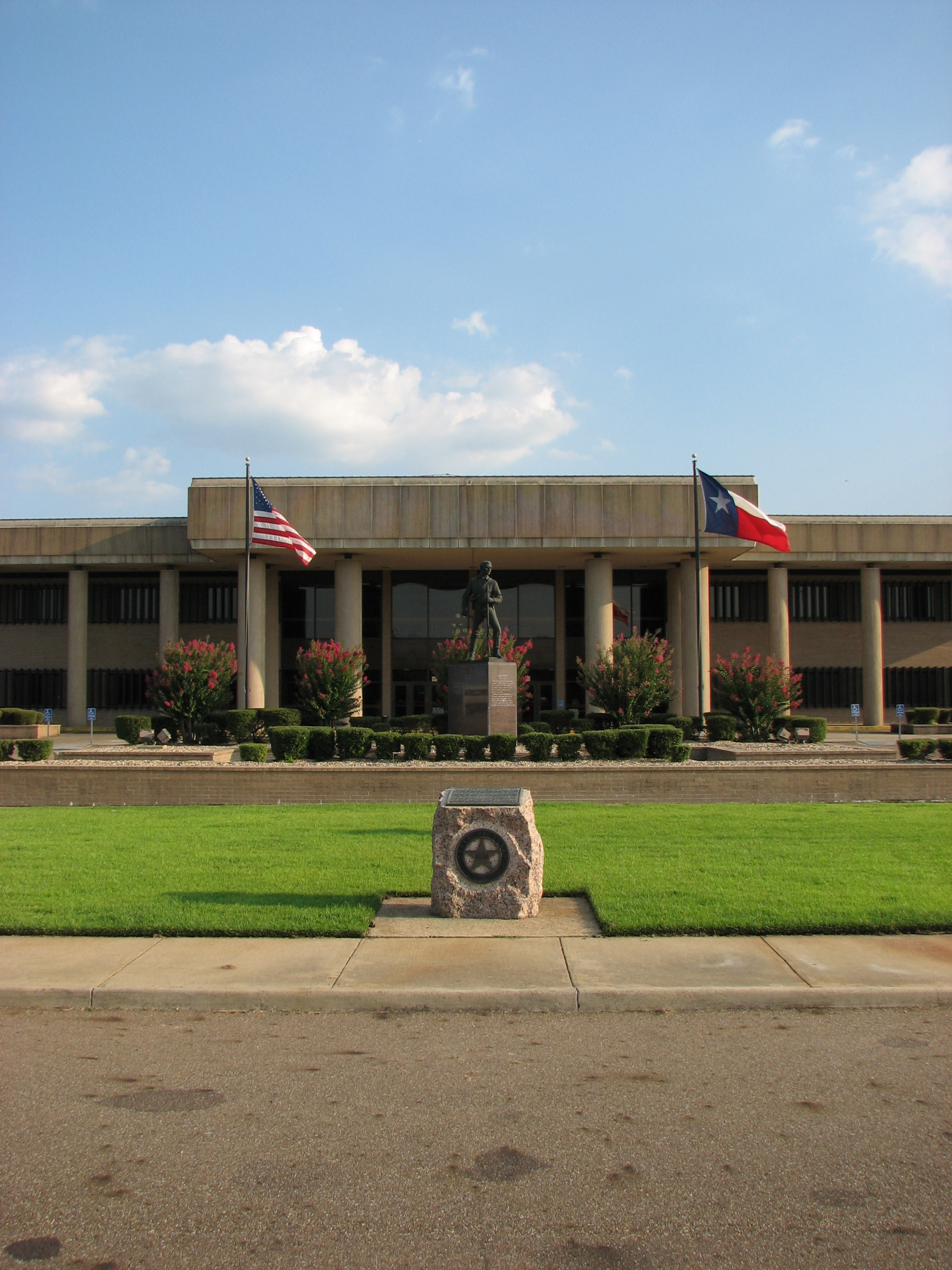
- The Bowie County Courthouse

- Location within the U.S. state of Texas
- Coordinates: 33°27′N 94°25′W
- Country: United States
- State: Texas
- Founded: 1840
- Named for: James Bowie
- Seat: Boston (legal); New Boston (courthouse)
- Largest city: Texarkana

Area
  - Total: 923 sq mi (2,390 km^{2})
  - Land: 885 sq mi (2,290 km^{2})
  - Water: 38 sq mi (98 km^{2}) 4.1%

Population (2020)
  - Total: 92,893
  - Estimate (2025): 92,696 ▼
  - Density: 105/sq mi (40.5/km^{2})
- Time zone: UTC−6 (Central)
  - Summer (DST): UTC−5 (CDT)
- Congressional districts: 1st, 4th
- Website: Official website

Bowie County (/ˈbuːi/ BOO-ee) is a county in the U.S. state of Texas. Its legal county seat is Boston, though its courthouse is located in New Boston. As of the 2020 census, the population was 92,893. Bowie County is part of the Texarkana metropolitan statistical area. The county is named for James Bowie, the legendary knife fighter who died at the Battle of the Alamo.

== History ==
=== Native Americans ===
The farming Caddoan Mississippian culture dates as early as the Late Archaic Period 1500 BCE in Bowie County. The Hernando de Soto expedition of 1541 resulted in violent encounters. Spanish and French missionaries brought smallpox, measles malaria, and influenza epidemics. Eventually, these issues and problems with the Osage, forced the Caddo to abandon their homelands. Settlers had peaceful relations with the 19th century Shawnee, Delaware and Kickapoo in the area.

=== Explorations and county established ===
French explorer Jean Baptiste Bénard de La Harpe founded the military fort Le Poste des Cadodaquious in 1719. The fort remained in continuous use until 1770. The Red River Expedition of 1806 which passed through Bowie County, headed by Thomas Freeman and Peter Custis, was of great diplomatic and economic importance to President Thomas Jefferson. Bowie County was established in December 1840 and reduced to its present size in 1846. DeKalb was the temporary county seat, with Boston becoming the permanent county seat in 1841.

Bowie County, in the years leading up to the American Civil War, was settled mostly by Southerners who brought their slave labor to work the cotton fields. By 1860, slaves outnumbered whites 2,651 to 2,401. The county voted 208–15 in favor of secession from the Union. While Bowie was never a battlefield in that war, it was occupied during Reconstruction. Between 1860 and 1870, the population declined. The occupation, and the new legal equality of blacks, became a hostile situation that fostered Cullen Baker.

Cullen Montgomery Baker (b. circa 1835 – d. 1869) was a twice-widowed, mean-spirited drunk who killed his first man before he was 20. When Thomas Orr married Baker's late wife's sister, thereby denying Baker that opportunity, Baker attempted to hang Orr. Legends abound as to his activities in Bowie and Cass Counties, including a rumored tie to the Ku Klux Klan. His exploits turned him into a folk hero dubbed "The Swamp Fox of the Sulphur River". He was a Confederate States Army veteran who joined two units, designated as a deserter from the first, and receiving a disability discharge from the second. Reconstruction allowed him to focus his anger toward what many at the time believed was a Union intrusion into their lives. Baker and his gang conducted a vicious rampage against citizens he perceived as being on the wrong side of the black labor issue, at William G. Kirkman and the Freedman's Bureau in Bowie County, and at the soldiers of the Union occupation. Kirkman unsuccessfully pursued Baker, killing one of Baker's men in the second attempt. Like Swamp Fox Francis Marion, Baker always managed to elude capture, often with the help of local citizens. Kirkland was murdered by "person or persons unknown", but Baker boasted of having done the deed. In December 1869, Thomas Orr and a group of neighbors killed Baker. A local legend has it the deed was accomplished with strychnine-laced whiskey.

When the Texas and Pacific Railway was constructed through the county, a new town named Texarkana was founded.

Bowie was hit hard by the Great Depression. Measurable relief came late when the Lone Star Army Ammunition Plant was established in 1942. The base was active until 2009. The Red River Army Depot, opened in 1941, remains active. The two installations occupied almost 40,000 acres (160 km^{2}) and provided job opportunities for thousands.

== Geography ==
According to the U.S. Census Bureau, the county has a total area of 923 square miles (2,390 km^{2}), of which 885 square miles (2,290 km^{2}) is land and 38 square miles (98 km^{2}) (4.1%) is covered by water.

Bowie County, Texas is one of only three counties in Texas to border two other U.S. states (the others being Dallam and Cass). Bowie County forms part of the tripoint of Texas-Oklahoma-Arkansas.

=== Adjacent counties ===
- Cass County south
- Morris County southwest
- Red River County west
- Miller County, Arkansas east
- Little River County, Arkansas northeast
- McCurtain County, Oklahoma northwest

=== Communities ===
==== Cities ====
- De Kalb
- Hooks
- Leary
- Maud
- Nash
- New Boston (courthouse in city)
- Red Lick
- Redwater
- Texarkana (largest city)
- Wake Village

==== Unincorporated communities ====
- Bassett
- Beaver Dam
- Boston
- Burns
- Carbondale
- College Hill
- Corley
- Dalby Springs
- Hubbard
- Malta
- Oak Grove
- Old Boston
- Old Salem
- Old Union
- Red Bank
- Siloam
- Simms
- Spring Hill
- South Texarkana
- Victory City
- Wamba
- Ward Creek

==== Ghost towns ====
- Darden
- Eylau
- Hartman
- Hodgson
- Sulphur

== Transportation ==
Major highways present in Bowie County include the following:

- I-30
- I-49
- I-369
- US 59
- US 67
- US 71
- US 82
- US 259
- SH 8
- SH 93
- SH 98
- Loop 14
- Loop 151
- Spur 74
- Spur 86
- Spur 594

== Demographics ==
Historical population
Census	Pop.	Note	%±
1850	2,912		—
1860	5,052		73.5%
1870	4,684		−7.3%
1880	10,965		134.1%
1890	20,267		84.8%
1900	26,676		31.6%
1910	34,827		30.6%
1920	39,472		13.3%
1930	48,563		23.0%
1940	50,208		3.4%
1950	61,966		23.4%
1960	59,971		−3.2%
1970	67,813		13.1%
1980	75,301		11.0%
1990	81,665		8.5%
2000	89,306		9.4%
2010	92,565		3.6%
2020	92,893		0.4%
2025 (est.)	92,696	▼	−0.2%
U.S. Decennial Census; 1850–2010 2010–2020

=== Racial and ethnic composition ===
Bowie County, Texas – Racial and ethnic composition Note: the US Census treats Hispanic/Latino as an ethnic category. This table excludes Latinos from the racial categories and assigns them to a separate category. Hispanics/Latinos may be of any race.
Race / Ethnicity (NH = Non-Hispanic)	Pop 1980	Pop 1990	Pop 2000	Pop 2010	Pop 2020	% 1980	% 1990	% 2000	% 2010	% 2020
White alone (NH)	57,565	61,964	62,712	61,343	55,855	76.45%	75.88%	70.22%	66.27%	60.13%
Black or African American alone (NH)	16,322	17,697	20,787	22,230	23,084	21.68%	21.67%	23.28%	24.02%	24.85%
Native American or Alaska Native alone (NH)	172	401	487	572	554	0.23%	0.49%	0.55%	0.62%	0.60%
Asian alone (NH)	199	258	372	721	1,082	0.26%	0.32%	0.42%	0.78%	1.16%
Native Hawaiian or Pacific Islander alone (NH)	x	x	33	45	69	x	x	0.04%	0.05%	0.07%
Other race alone (NH)	50	11	50	88	332	0.07%	0.01%	0.06%	0.10%	0.36%
Mixed race or Multiracial (NH)	x	x	873	1,504	4,315	x	x	0.98%	1.62%	4.65%
Hispanic or Latino (any race)	993	1,334	3,992	6,062	7,602	1.32%	1.63%	4.47%	6.55%	8.18%
Total	75,301	81,665	89,306	92,565	92,893	100.00%	100.00%	100.00%	100.00%	100.00%

=== 2020 census ===
As of the 2020 census, the county had a population of 92,893. The median age was 39.7 years. 23.0% of residents were under the age of 18 and 17.7% of residents were 65 years of age or older. For every 100 females there were 101.0 males, and for every 100 females age 18 and over there were 100.3 males age 18 and over.

The racial makeup of the county was 61.9% White, 25.0% Black or African American, 0.8% American Indian and Alaska Native, 1.2% Asian, 0.1% Native Hawaiian and Pacific Islander, 4.6% from some other race, and 6.4% from two or more races. Hispanic or Latino residents of any race comprised 8.2% of the population.

62.1% of residents lived in urban areas, while 37.9% lived in rural areas.

There were 35,518 households in the county, of which 31.4% had children under the age of 18 living in them. Of all households, 43.0% were married-couple households, 18.8% were households with a male householder and no spouse or partner present, and 32.6% were households with a female householder and no spouse or partner present. About 29.6% of all households were made up of individuals and 12.5% had someone living alone who was 65 years of age or older.

There were 39,536 housing units, of which 10.2% were vacant. Among occupied housing units, 62.0% were owner-occupied and 38.0% were renter-occupied. The homeowner vacancy rate was 1.8% and the rental vacancy rate was 9.9%.

=== 2000 census ===
As of the 2000 census, 89,306 people, 33,058 households, and 23,438 families resided in the county. The population density was 101 inhabitants per square mile (39/km^{2}). The 36,463 housing units averaged 41 units per square mile (16/km^{2}). The racial makeup of the county was 73.26% White, 23.42% Black or African American, 0.58% Native American, 0.43% Asian, 0.04% Pacific Islander, 1.12% from other races, and 1.15% from two or more races. About 4.47% of the population was Hispanic or Latino of any race.

== Government and politics ==
Barry Telford Unit, a Texas Department of Criminal Justice prison for men, is in an unincorporated area of the county, near New Boston. Federal Correctional Institution, Texarkana, is a Federal Bureau of Prisons facility in unincorporated Bowie County, near Texarkana, Texas.

Bowie County is no longer one of the seven dry counties in the state of Texas. Both the city of Nash and the city of Texarkana (on November 6, 2013, and November 5, 2014, respectively) have passed laws that allow the sale of beer and wine.

=== Politics ===
United States presidential election results for Bowie County, Texas
Year	Republican		Democratic		Third party(ies)	
Year	No.	%	No.	%	No.	%
1912	317	15.15%	1,542	73.71%	233	11.14%
1916	414	15.72%	1,941	73.69%	279	10.59%
1920	1,032	26.80%	2,396	62.22%	423	10.98%
1924	740	16.58%	3,455	77.40%	269	6.03%
1928	2,225	42.57%	3,002	57.43%	0	0.00%
1932	541	9.28%	5,269	90.39%	19	0.33%
1936	472	8.55%	5,030	91.11%	19	0.34%
1940	1,107	13.75%	6,937	86.18%	5	0.06%
1944	790	8.87%	7,045	79.14%	1,067	11.99%
1948	1,161	11.22%	7,028	67.95%	2,154	20.83%
1952	6,501	38.34%	10,437	61.56%	16	0.09%
1956	6,823	46.73%	7,675	52.56%	104	0.71%
1960	5,927	39.01%	9,198	60.54%	68	0.45%
1964	7,018	40.31%	10,368	59.55%	24	0.14%
1968	5,966	30.44%	6,468	33.00%	7,165	36.56%
1972	14,722	73.55%	5,227	26.12%	66	0.33%
1976	9,590	43.17%	12,445	56.02%	179	0.81%
1980	13,942	54.35%	11,339	44.21%	369	1.44%
1984	18,244	64.22%	10,077	35.47%	88	0.31%
1988	15,454	55.31%	12,331	44.13%	156	0.56%
1992	11,776	38.78%	11,825	38.94%	6,764	22.28%
1996	12,750	43.56%	13,657	46.66%	2,863	9.78%
2000	18,325	60.44%	11,662	38.46%	333	1.10%
2004	21,791	64.55%	11,880	35.19%	89	0.26%
2008	24,162	68.67%	10,815	30.74%	209	0.59%
2012	24,869	70.24%	10,196	28.80%	339	0.96%
2016	24,924	72.03%	8,838	25.54%	840	2.43%
2020	27,116	70.87%	10,747	28.09%	398	1.04%
2024	27,122	74.01%	9,282	25.33%	240	0.65%

United States Senate election results for Bowie County, Texas1
Year	Republican		Democratic		Third party(ies)	
Year	No.	%	No.	%	No.	%
2024	26,219	72.43%	9,405	25.98%	573	1.58%

United States Senate election results for Bowie County, Texas2
Year	Republican		Democratic		Third party(ies)	
Year	No.	%	No.	%	No.	%
2020	26,908	70.94%	10,406	27.43%	617	1.63%

Texas Gubernatorial election results for Bowie County
Year	Republican		Democratic		Third party(ies)	
Year	No.	%	No.	%	No.	%
2022	20,206	75.18%	6,060	22.55%	610	2.27%

Bowie County had voting patterns similar to the Solid South up until 1976. The county has consistently voted for the GOP in each 21st century president election. The last Democrat to win this county was Bill Clinton of neighboring Arkansas, with which the county shares the Texarkana metropolitan area, in both of his national victories.

Bowie County is located within District 1 of the Texas House of Representatives. Bowie County is located within District 1 of the Texas Senate.

== Education ==
These school districts serve Bowie County:

- De Kalb ISD
- Hooks ISD
- Hubbard ISD
- Leary ISD
- Liberty-Eylau ISD
- Malta ISD
- Maud ISD
- New Boston ISD
- Pleasant Grove ISD
- Red Lick ISD
- Redwater ISD
- Simms ISD
- Texarkana ISD

All of Bowie County is in the service area and taxation area of Texarkana College.

== Notable people ==
- Jean Baptiste Brevelle (1698-1754), early 18th century explorer, trader and soldier of Fort Saint Jean Baptiste des Natchitoches and Le Poste des Cadodaquious, the first European settlement in the county. Namesake of nearby Brevelle Lake.

== See also ==
- Le Poste des Cadodaquious, a French fort established in Bowie County in 1719
- Brevelle Lake, a North Texas lake named for French soldier and explorer of Le Poste des Cadodaquious
- National Register of Historic Places listings in Bowie County, Texas
- Recorded Texas Historic Landmarks in Bowie County
