= Eylau, Texas =

- Ghost town
- Location within Texas Location within the United States
- Coordinates: 33°22′45″N 94°06′59″W
- Country: United States
- State: Texas
- County: Bowie
- Elevation: 322 ft (98 m)
- Time zone: UTC-6 (Central (CST))
  - Summer (DST): UTC-5 (CDT)
- Area codes: 430 & 903
- GNIS feature ID: 1357139

Eylau (/ˈaɪloʊ/) is a ghost town in Bowie County, Texas, United States.

== History ==
Collin M. Akin bought land along the river and established Eylau sometime after the Battle of San Jacinto. A post office was established at Eylau in 1885 and remained in operation until 1895. Its population was 30 in 1890. It ceased to exist as a community in 1940.

== Geography ==
Eylau is located on U.S. Route 59, 5.1 miles (8.2 km) southwest of Texarkana.

== Education ==
A school on Collin M. Akin's land was consolidated with the Sylar School on the M.H. Jones survey in 1886. Today, the community of Eylau is served by the Liberty-Eylau Independent School District.
