= Texarkana Independent School District =

School district in Texas, United States

Location
- Texas; United States

District information
- Type: Public (government funded)
- Grades: PK-12
- Established: 1889
- Accreditation(s): Texas Education Agency
- Schools: 12

Students and staff
- Students: 8,000
- Teachers: 1,000

Other information
- Website: www.txkisd.net

Texarkana Independent School District is an urban school district serving 34 square miles (88 km^{2}) in the Northeast corner of Texas (USA). It serves the majority of Texarkana, Texas, and the surrounding communities of Wake Village and Nash. It is the largest school district in Bowie County and the largest district served by the Region VIII Education Service Center. Texarkana ISD does not service Texarkana, Arkansas-side schools, who are managed by the Texarkana Arkansas Schools under the Arkansas State Government. It was established in 1889. Unique among other schools in its region, it accepts transfers from other Texas school districts tuition-free.

In 2009, the school district was rated "academically acceptable" by the Texas Education Agency.

== Schools ==
- Texas High School (Grades 9‍–‍12)

During 2023‍–‍2024, Texas High School had an enrollment of 1,762 students in grades 9‍–‍12 and a student to teacher ratio of 10.86.

- Texas Middle School (Grades 6‍–‍8)

During 2023‍–‍2024, Texas Middle School had an enrollment of 1,361 students in grades 6‍–‍8 and a student to teacher ratio of 12.91.

- Martha & Josh Morriss Math & Engineering Elementary (Grades KG‍–‍5)

During 2023‍–‍2024, Martha & Josh Morriss Math & Engineering Elementary had an enrollment of 360 students in grades KG‍–‍5 and a student to teacher ratio of 15.32.

- Nash Elementary (Grades PK‍–‍5)

During 2023‍–‍2024, Nash Elementary had an enrollment of 656 students in grades PK‍–‍5 and a student to teacher ratio of 15.81.

- Waggoner Creek Elementary (Grades PK‍–‍5)

During 2023‍–‍2024, Waggoner Creek Elementary had an enrollment of 347 students in grades PK‍–‍5 and a student to teacher ratio of 14.33.

- Wake Village Elementary (Grades PK‍–‍5)

During 2023‍–‍2024, Wake Village Elementary had an enrollment of 548 students in grades PK‍–‍5 and a student to teacher ratio of 12.26. In 1985‍–‍86, the school was recognized as a National Blue Ribbon School)

- Westlawn Elementary (Grades PK‍–‍5)

During 2023‍–‍2024, Westlawn Elementary had an enrollment of 342 students in grades 3‍–‍5 and a student to teacher ratio of 11.28.

- Parks Elementary School (Grades PK-5)

The school opened in August 2025 as a consolidation of 2 elementary schools, Highland Park Elementary & Spring Lake Park Elementary.

- Theron Jones Early Literacy Center (Grades KG‍–‍2)

During 2023‍–‍2024, Theron Jones Early Literacy Center had an enrollment of 339 students in grades KG‍–‍2 and a student to teacher ratio of 10.07.

- Paul Laurence Dunbar Early Education Center (Grades PK)

During 2023‍–‍2024, Paul Laurence Dunbar Early Education Center had an enrollment of 304 students in pre-kindergarten and a student to teacher ratio of 13.02.

=== Alternative Schools ===
- Disciplinary Alternative School
- OPTIONS Academic Alternative

== See also ==
- List of school districts in Texas
