= Pleasant Grove Independent School District (Bowie County, Texas) =

School district in Texas, United States

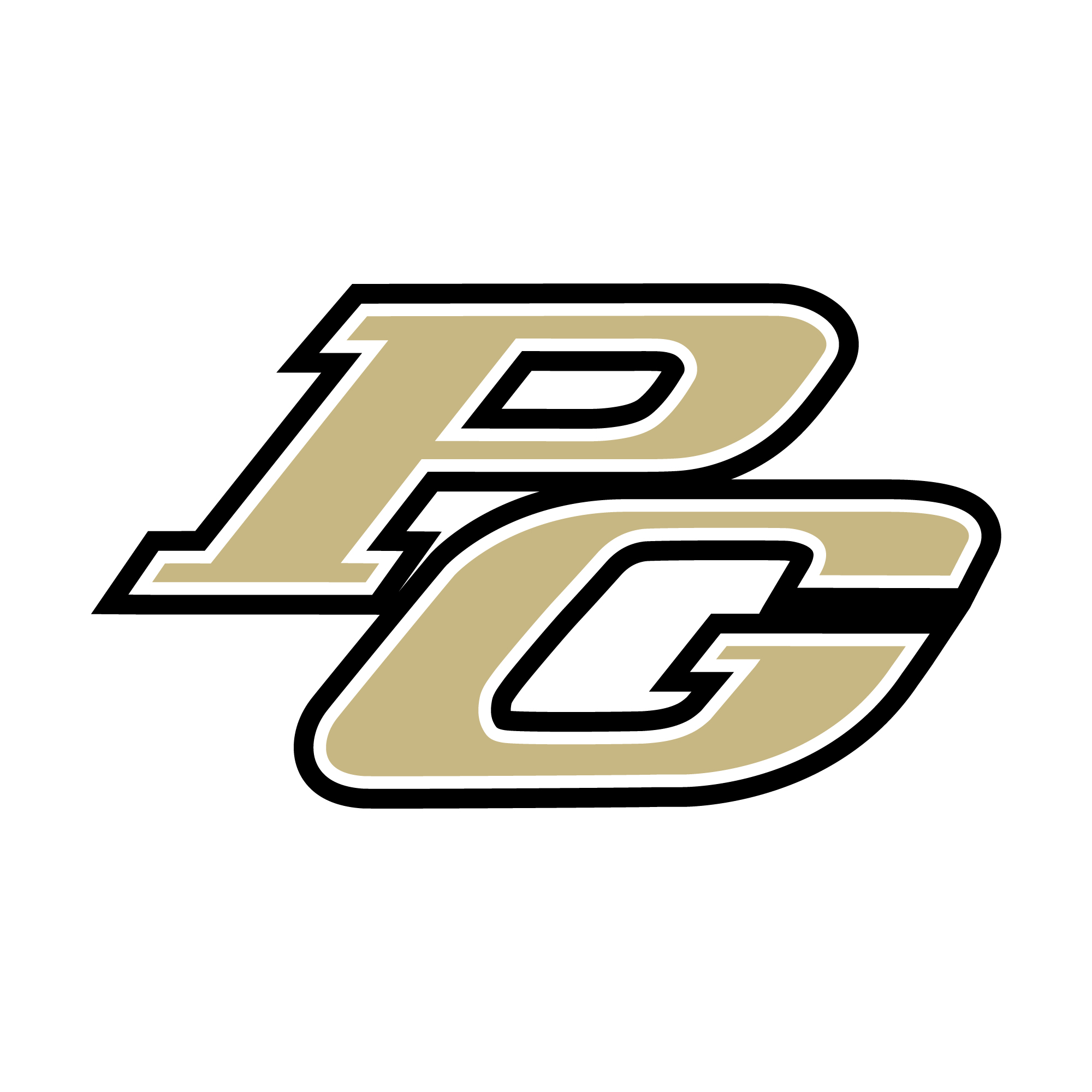
- 8500 North Kings Highway Texarkana, Bowie, Texas, 75503

District information
- Type: Public
- Grades: K-12
- Established: 1877
- Superintendent: Chad Pirtle

Students and staff
- Students: 2,300
- Student–teacher ratio: 13:1
- Colors: Black, Gold

Other information
- Website: www.pgisd.net

Pleasant Grove Independent School District is a public school district in Texarkana, Texas. It consists of an elementary, intermediate, middle, and high school.

== History ==
The district's first school was a one-room schoolhouse established in 1877. The district was officially formed in 1916 as Pleasant Grove District when the Baker District and the Morriss District combined. The district had only an elementary school until 1977, when it opened Pleasant Grove Junior High. The next year, the district was renamed Pleasant Grove Independent School District. In 1983, the district received voter approval to expand its services to the twelfth grade. In 2010, the district opened a fourth school: Pleasant Grove Intermediate School. In November 2020, the previous Pleasant Grove Elementary School closed and was replaced by Margaret Fischer Davis Elementary School.

== Schools ==
- Pleasant Grove High School (Grades 9‍–‍12)

During 2023‍–‍2024, Pleasant Grove High School had an enrollment of 753 students in grades 9‍–‍12 and a student to teacher ratio of 11.03.

- Pleasant Grove Middle School (Grades 6‍–‍8)

During 2023‍–‍2024, Pleasant Grove Middle School had an enrollment of 529 students in grades 6‍–‍8 and a student to teacher ratio of 13.31.

- Pleasant Grove Intermediate (Grades 3‍–‍5)

During 2023‍–‍2024, Pleasant Grove Intermediate had an enrollment of 483 students in grades 3‍–‍5 and a student to teacher ratio of 13.79.

- Margaret Fischer Davis Elementary (Grades PK‍–‍2)

During 2023‍–‍2024, Margaret Fischer Davis Elementary had an enrollment of 509 students in grades PK‍–‍2 and a student to teacher ratio of 14.16.

== Sports ==
- Baseball
- Football
- Track & Field
- Tennis
- Basketball
- Volleyball
- Softball

== Accountability Rating ==
In 2022, the Pleasant Grove Independent School District received an "A"
