= Lone Star Army Ammunition Plant =

Coordinates: 33°25′59″N 94°14′56″W

- Active: 1942 - 2009
- Country: United States
- Website: https://www.jmc.army.mil/

The Lone Star Army Ammunition Plant was a 15,546-acre (62.91 km^{2}) government-owned, contractor-operated (GOCO) facility 12 miles west of Texarkana, Texas that was established in 1942. The land was purchased from local citizens through Eminent Domain by the United States Department of Defense. The Lone Star Defense Corporation, a subsidiary of the B. F. Goodrich Rubber Corporation, won the contract on July 23, 1941 to produce artillery shells, bombs, fuses, boosters, and other auxiliary munitions at the site. The plant produced ammunition throughout World War II, the Korean War and the Vietnam War. The plant was last operated by Day & Zimmermann.

== Today ==
The Lone Star Army Ammunition Plant was officially deactivated September 30, 2009, after serving its mission of providing ammunition for almost 70 years. EPA continues to conduct five-year reviews of the site remedy. These reviews ensure that the remedies put in place continues to protect human health and the environment.

== Environment ==
The Lone Star Army Ammunition Plant was listed as a Superfund site on the National Priorities List on July 22, 1987. The United States Environmental Protection Agency listed the primary contaminants of concern as tetryl, mercury, chromium, and lead. Cleanup activities began on June 29, 2001 and continued until September 24, 2002. The site was deleted from the National Priorities List in 2010.
