= Red River Army Depot =

Military installation in Bowie County, Texas, U.S.

Coordinates: 33°25′52″N 94°19′08″W

- Bowie County, Texas
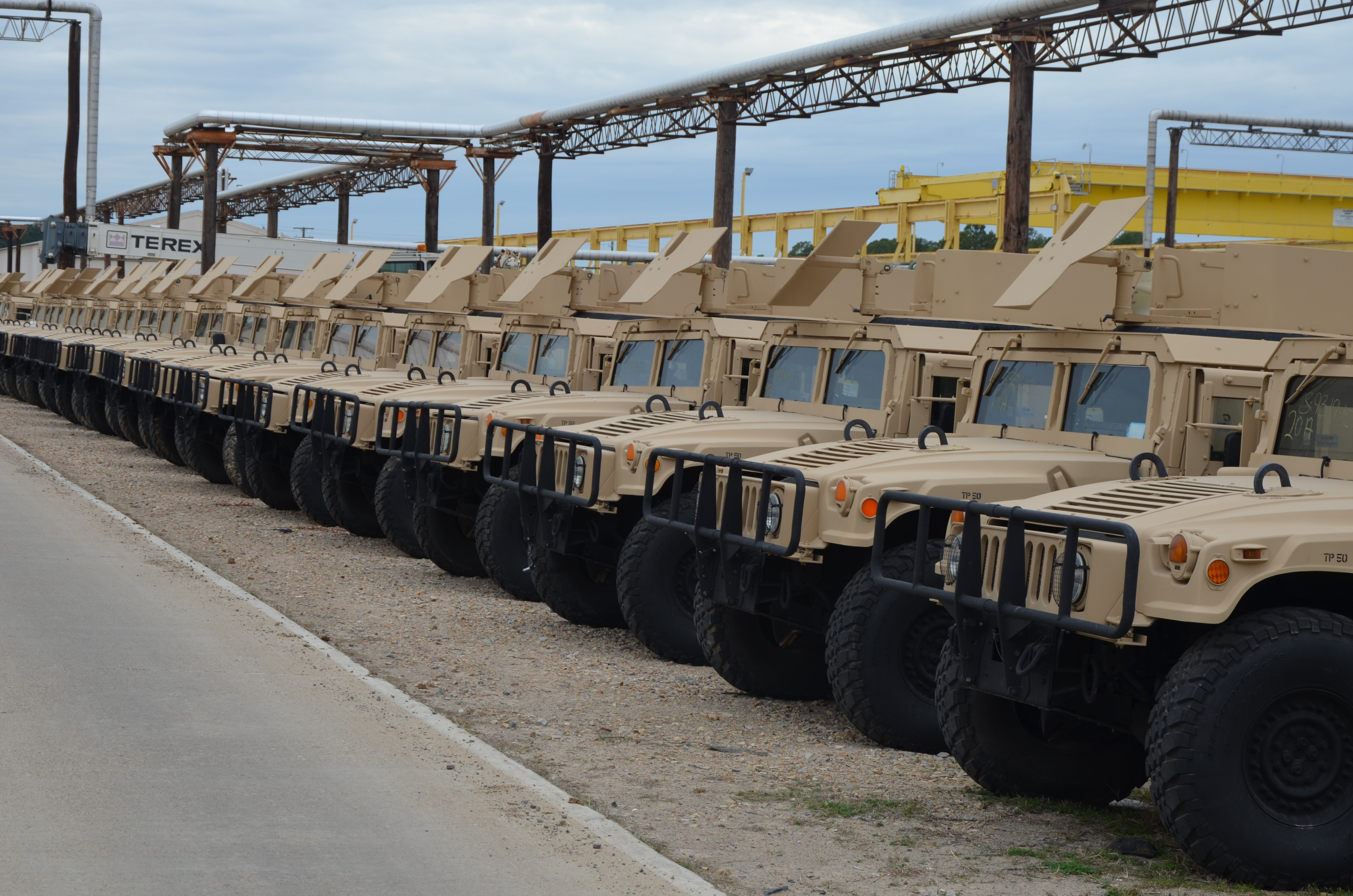

Site information
- Type: Depot
- Owner: US Army Material Command
- Operator: United States Army
- Open to the public: No
- Website: redriver.army.mil

Location
- Area: 15,375 acres (6,222 ha) with 8,000,000 sq ft (740,000 m^{2}) of facilities

Site history
- In use: 1941 - present

Garrison information
- Current commander: COL Denis J. Fajardo

The Red River Army Depot (RRAD) is an 15,375-acre (62.22 km^{2}) (24 sq. mi) depot-level maintenance facility 18 miles (29 km) west of Texarkana, Texas, in Bowie County.

== History ==
RRAD was activated in 1941 to create an ammunition storage facility. Due to the demands of WWII, the mission was expanded to include general supply storage and tank repair. The depot was supposed to be deactivated after the findings of the 1995 Base Realignment and Closure Commission. The depot remained open after the commission reconsidered. It was again decided that the depot was to be closed upon a recommendation from the 2005 Base Realignment and Closure Commission, but it remained open to provide maintenance support for the Army.

A workforce of more than 3,500 engage in work ranging from producing timber to remanufacturing the Mine Resistant Ambush Protected Vehicle. The depot occupies 15,375 acres (6,222 ha), has more than 1,400 buildings, and is host to 16 tenant organizations. Over 8,000,000 square feet (740,000 m^{2}) of floor space allows workers to rebuild a large variety of vehicle systems and components for the US Army. The depot also continues to support the field army with deployments to Southwest Asia to maintain various vehicle systems. RRAD is responsible for over 5,000 civilian deployments to Kuwait, Afghanistan, and Iraq in direct support of the soldiers in the field. Red River is the first Tank-Automotive and Armaments Command (TACOM) facility to achieve Voluntary Protection Program (VPP) Star Status (occupational safety and health). In addition, Red River was the first depot within the Army Materiel Command to achieve ISO 9001:2000 certification throughout all administrative and production processes. The depot also has a long-standing ISO 14001:2004 registration for Environmental Management Systems. The depot supports the US Army and provides inter-service support to the Marine Corps, Air Force, and Navy repair and overhaul programs.

=== Command ===
In June 2026, Colonel Christopher Masson assumed duties as the 46th Commander of Red River Army Depot.

== CITE designation ==
Red River is the Army's Center of Industrial and Technical Excellence (CITE) for Tactical Wheeled Vehicles including but not limited to each variant of the Mine Resistant Ambush Protected (MRAP) Vehicle; the High Mobility Multipurpose Wheeled Vehicle (HMMWV); the Heavy Expanded Mobility Tactical Truck (HEMTT); the Armored Security Vehicle (ASV); the 5-Ton Truck Family of Vehicles; the Family of Medium Tactical Vehicles (FMTV); the Heavy Equipment Transporter (HET); Palletized Load System (PLS) and the Rough Terrain Container Handler (RTCH). The depot is also CITE for the Bradley Fighting Vehicle and also conducts rebuild work on the Multiple Launch Rocket System (MLRS) and the High-Mobility Artillery Rocket System (HIMARS).
