= Simms, Texas =

Unincorporated community in Bowie County, Texas, United States

Simms, Bowie County, Texas
- Unincorporated community
- Location within Texas Location within the United States
- Coordinates: 33°21′01″N 94°30′27″W
- Country: United States
- State: Texas
- County: Bowie
- Elevation: 427 ft (130 m)
- Time zone: UTC-6 (Central (CST))
  - Summer (DST): UTC-5 (CDT)
- ZIP code: 75574
- Area codes: 903 & 430
- GNIS feature ID: 1364265

Simms is an unincorporated community in Bowie County, Texas, United States. According to the Handbook of Texas, the community had a population of 240 in 2000. It is part of the Texarkana metropolitan area.

== History ==
Simms was named for G.W. Simms, who helped establish a post office in the community in 1890. Two years later, the community developed a gristmill, a gin, and a store alongside a population of 50. It grew to 150 in 1914 and returned to 50 in the 1930s. It continued to grow into the next decade and had four businesses in 1982. The population jumped to 240 at that time and remained at that level through 2000.

== Geography ==
Simms is located 9 mi (14 km) southwest of Boston in southwestern Bowie County.

=== Climate ===
The climate in this area is characterized by hot, humid summers and generally mild to cool winters. According to the Köppen Climate Classification system, Simms has a humid subtropical climate, abbreviated "Cfa" on climate maps.

== Education ==
The Simms Independent School District serves area students.

== Notable person ==
- Rac Slider, retired baseball infielder and coach for the Boston Red Sox, was born in Simms.

== See also ==
- List of unincorporated communities in Texas
