= New Boston, Texas =

- City
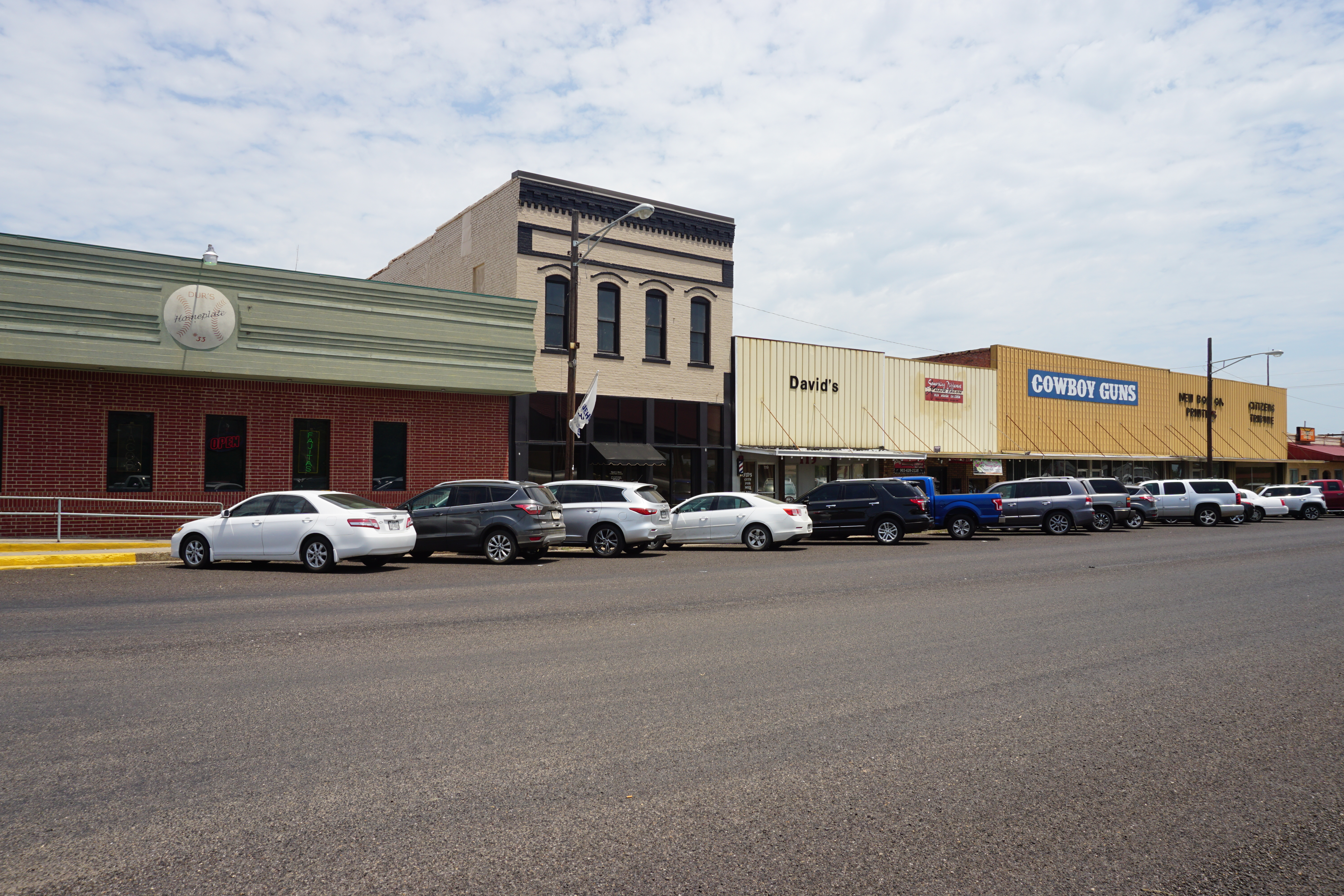
- NE Front Street in New Boston

- Seal

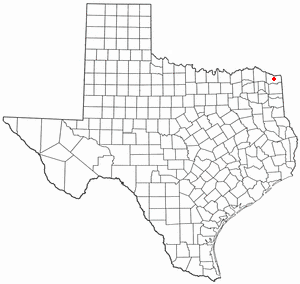
- Location of New Boston, Texas

- Coordinates: 33°27′41″N 94°25′09″W
- Country: United States
- State: Texas
- County: Bowie

Area
  - Total: 4.03 sq mi (10.44 km^{2})
  - Land: 4.00 sq mi (10.36 km^{2})
  - Water: 0.031 sq mi (0.08 km^{2})
- Elevation: 364 ft (111 m)

Population (2020)
  - Total: 4,612
  - Density: 1,153/sq mi (445.2/km^{2})
- Time zone: UTC-6 (Central (CST))
  - Summer (DST): UTC-5 (CDT)
- ZIP code: 75570
- Area codes: 903, 430
- FIPS code: 48-50808
- GNIS feature ID: 2411227
- Website: www.nbcity.org

New Boston is a city in Bowie County, Texas, United States. Boston was named for an early storekeeper in the settlement, W.J. Boston. The coming of the railroads led to the location of two more Bostons. A depot was built approximately 4 miles north of Boston and was named New Boston. The original Boston then became Old Boston. The courthouse was moved to Texarkana in the early 1880s, but a later election carried to move the courthouse back to the geographic center of the county. This location was between the Bostons. The Post Office Department named this location Boston, so Bowie County has claim to three Bostons: New Boston, Boston, and Old Boston. The population was 4,550 at the 2010 census and 4,612 in 2020.

== History ==
The Red River Expedition (1806) was stopped by the Spanish in the vicinity of the town.

When the Missouri Pacific Railroad was being constructed 4 miles (6 km) north of the village of Boston (now Old Boston) in the summer of 1876, it was clear to many businessmen in the town that it would suffer a serious decline as a result of its distance from the line. At a mass meeting, J. H. Smelser, a local resident and surveyor for the railroad, was selected to meet with railroad officials to secure the location of a depot at a point on the line nearest to Boston. The negotiations were successful, and in September 1876, lots were laid out and put up for sale on 100 acres (0.40 km^{2}) that the railroad had purchased. Because most of those engaged in the project were from Boston, the new town was named New Boston.

A post office was established in 1877 with L. C. DeMorse as postmaster. The town grew rapidly, and by 1884, it had 400 residents, two churches, a school, several mills and gins, and a newspaper, the New Boston Herald, edited by W. W. West. A furniture factory and another newspaper, the Bowie County Populist, were added in the 1890s.

By 1900, the town had a population of 762. It grew slowly until the late 1920s, when a short-lived boom raised the population from 869 in 1925 to 1,300 in 1929. The population fell to 949 by 1931. During World War II, the Lone Star Army Ammunition Plant and the Red River Army Depot were constructed just southeast of New Boston. The two massive military installations were probably responsible for the town's rapid growth in the 1940s. The population grew from 1,111 in 1940, then to 2,688 in 1950. In 1980, it reached 4,628. Although an International Paper mill, the Barry Telford state prison and a few smaller factories provided some industrial base for the town, New Boston depends heavily on the two military installations for its continued prosperity. The town had 5,057 residents in 1990 and 4,550 residents in 2010.

New Boston is known for its Pioneer Days Festival and Rodeo. The townfolk gather at the T&P Trailhead Park for entertainment such as carnival rides, street dances, and live musical and comedy presentations.

On the evening of November 4, 2022, an EF3 tornado hit the western outskirts of the city, causing minor damage.

== Geography ==
New Boston is located near the center of Bowie County. U.S. Route 82 passes through the center of the city, and Interstate 30 runs through the northern part of the city, with access from Exits 199 and 201. By either route, it is 22 miles (35 km) east to Texarkana. I-30 leads southwest 40 miles (64 km) to Mount Pleasant, and US 82 leads west-northwest 70 miles (110 km) to Paris. Texas State Highway 8 leads south 4 miles (6.4 km) to Old Boston, the site of original town settlement in the 1800s, and north 7 miles (11 km) to the Red River and the border with the state of Arkansas, continuing into Arkansas as Arkansas State Highway 41 to De Queen and junction US Routes 70 and 71. The Red River Army Depot borders the southeastern edge of New Boston.

According to the United States Census Bureau, the city has a total area of 3.3 square miles (8.5 km^{2}), all land.

=== Climate ===
The climate in this area is characterized by hot, humid summers and generally mild to cool winters. According to the Köppen climate classification system, New Boston has a humid subtropical climate, Cfa on climate maps.

== Demographics ==
Historical population
Census	Pop.	Note	%±
1870	273		—
1880	257		−5.9%
1890	382		48.6%
1920	869		—
1930	949		9.2%
1940	1,111		17.1%
1950	2,688		141.9%
1960	2,773		3.2%
1970	4,034		45.5%
1980	4,628		14.7%
1990	5,057		9.3%
2000	4,808		−4.9%
2010	4,550		−5.4%
2020	4,612		1.4%
U.S. Decennial Census

=== 2020 census ===
As of the 2020 census, New Boston had a population of 4,612, with 1,918 households and 1,152 families residing in the city.

The median age was 36.8 years; 26.4% of residents were under the age of 18 and 17.0% of residents were 65 years of age or older. For every 100 females there were 85.1 males, and for every 100 females age 18 and over there were 80.7 males age 18 and over.

There were 1,918 households in New Boston, of which 31.9% had children under the age of 18 living in them. Of all households, 35.3% were married-couple households, 19.0% were households with a male householder and no spouse or partner present, and 39.9% were households with a female householder and no spouse or partner present. About 32.8% of all households were made up of individuals and 14.5% had someone living alone who was 65 years of age or older.

There were 2,182 housing units, of which 12.1% were vacant. The homeowner vacancy rate was 2.4% and the rental vacancy rate was 9.6%.

97.1% of residents lived in urban areas, while 2.9% lived in rural areas.

Racial composition as of the 2020 census
Race	Number	Percent
White	2,977	64.5%
Black or African American	987	21.4%
American Indian and Alaska Native	43	0.9%
Asian	38	0.8%
Native Hawaiian and Other Pacific Islander	4	0.1%
Some other race	125	2.7%
Two or more races	438	9.5%
Hispanic or Latino (of any race)	279	6.0%

=== 2000 census ===
As of the census of 2000, 4,808 people, 1,968 households, and 1,334 families resided in the city. The population density was 1,377.1 inhabitants per square mile (531.7/km^{2}). The 2,229 housing units averaged 638.4 units per square mile (246.5 units/km^{2}). The racial makeup of the city was 79.49% White, 17.64% African American, 0.75% Native American, 0.27% Asian, 0.10% Pacific Islander, 0.44% from other races, and 1.31% from two or more races. Hispanic or Latino people of any race were 1.46% of the population.

Of the 1,968 households, 32.8% had children under the age of 18 living with them, 47.8% were married couples living together, 17.6% had a female householder with no husband present, and 32.2% were not families; 30.1% of all households were made up of individuals, and 15.5% had someone living alone who was 65 years of age or older. The average household size was 2.39 and the average family size was 2.96.

In the city, the population was distributed as 26.6% under the age of 18, 7.8% from 18 to 24, 25.2% from 25 to 44, 21.5% from 45 to 64, and 18.8% who were 65 years of age or older. The median age was 38 years. For every 100 females, there were 82.1 males. For every 100 females age 18 and over, there were 74.7 males.

The median income for a household in the city was $26,531, and for a family was $38,542. Males had a median income of $29,940 versus $21,316 for females. The per capita income for the city was $14,190. About 11.6% of families and 15.0% of the population were below the poverty line, including 19.9% of those under age 18 and 8.9% of those age 65 or over.

== Government ==
The Barry B. Telford Unit of the Texas Department of Criminal Justice is in an unincorporated area near New Boston.

=== Courthouse ===
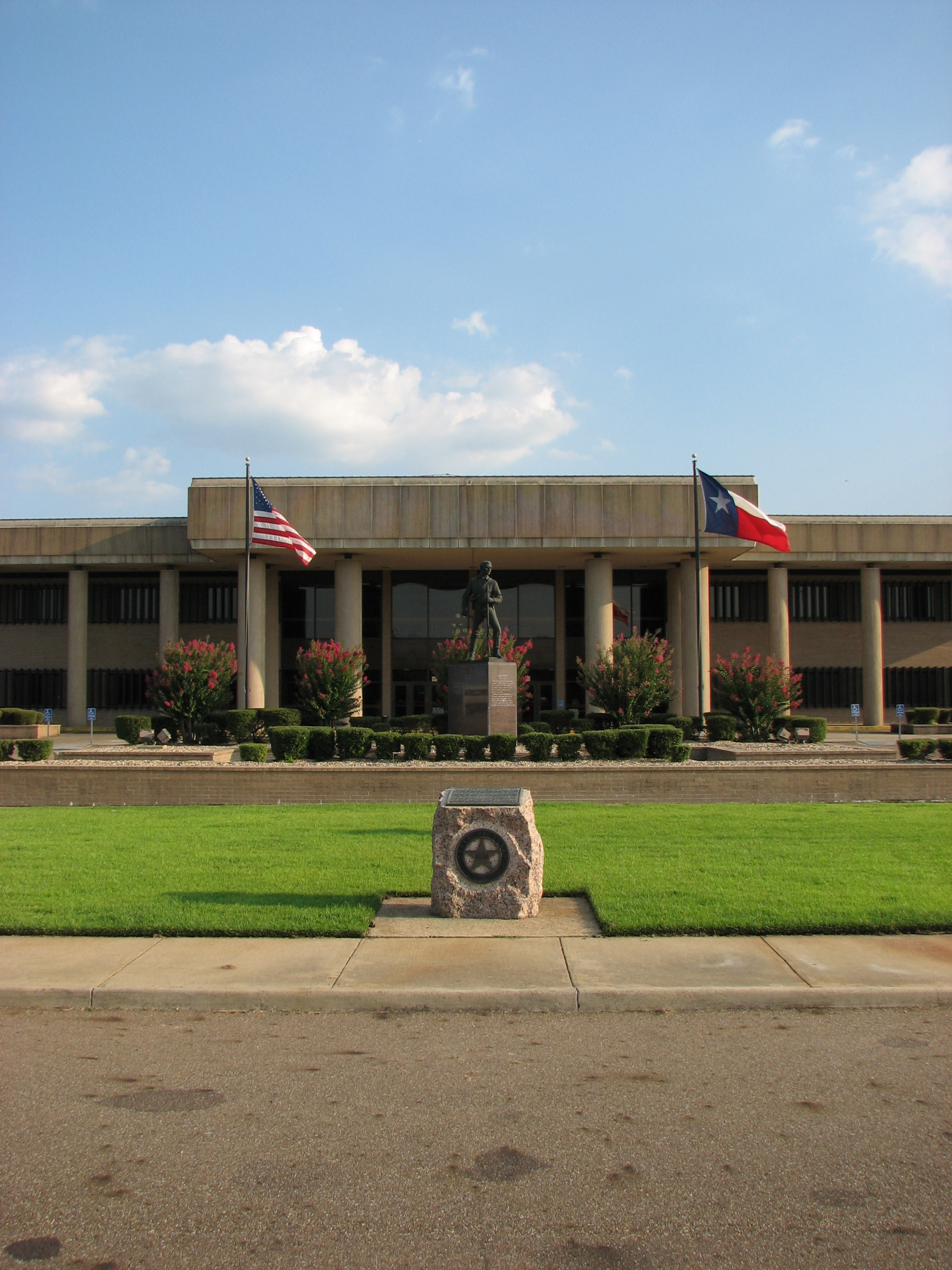
Bowie County Courthouse

On March 4, 1986, a new modern county courthouse was dedicated in New Boston on the Interstate, but Boston remained the official county seat. The old Bowie County Courthouse, constructed in Boston in 1889 in the exact geographic center of the county, was abandoned after construction of the new building. On the night of August 13, 1987, the old courthouse was burned by an arsonist.

== Education ==
New Boston is served by the New Boston Independent School District and home to the New Boston High School Lions.

== Transportation ==
- Interstate 30
- U.S. Highway 82
- State Highway 8

== Notable people ==
- Devin the Dude, American rapper, spent some of his high school years here
- Jeff Gladney, NFL cornerback for the Minnesota Vikings
- LaMichael James, NFL player
- Ryan Lynch, racing driver
- Kim Phillips, NFL CB for the New Orleans Saints and Buffalo Bills
- R. Gerald Turner, President of Southern Methodist University since 1995
- Gary VanDeaver, is a Republican member of the Texas House of Representatives
