= Liberty-Eylau Independent School District =

School district in Texas

- Liberty-Eylau, Bowie, Texas

District information
- Grades: PK-12
- Established: 1886
- Schools: 4

Other information
- Website: http://www.leisd.net/

Liberty-Eylau Independent School District (/ˈaɪloʊ/) is a public school district in southeastern Bowie County, Texas, United States.

In 2009, the school district was rated "academically acceptable" by the Texas Education Agency.

== Schools ==
- Liberty-Eylau High School (Grades 9‍–‍12)

During 2022‍–‍2023, Liberty-Eylau High School had an enrollment of 532 students in grades 9‍–‍12 and a student to teacher ratio of 7.41.

- Liberty-Eylau Middle School (Grades 5‍–‍8)

During 2022‍–‍2023, Liberty-Eylau Middle School had an enrollment of 573 students in grades 5‍–‍8 and a student to teacher ratio of 11.87.

- Liberty-Eylau Elementary (Grades 1‍–‍4)

During 2022‍–‍2023, Liberty-Eylau Elementary had an enrollment of 575 students in grades 1‍–‍4 and a student to teacher ratio of 14.52.

- Liberty-Eylau Early Childhood Center (PK‍–‍KG)

During 2022‍–‍2023, Liberty-Eylau Early Childhood Center had an enrollment of 323 students in grades PK‍–‍KG and a student to teacher ratio of 15.64.

== History ==
=== Liberty ===
The first Liberty School was organized about 1886 by P.F. McCormick and others. There were 19 scholars enrolled with Parson Alford employed as the first teacher. The building was a crude frame building and the equipment was not plentiful. A spring about two hundred yards east of the schoolhouse supplied the drinking water.

In 1902 the schoolhouse was moved to the Shreveport Highway, near Mrs. Hart's place. The original location was a part of the property where the Creosoting Plant is now located. As the community became more thickly settled, another room was added, and the community could boast of a two-teacher school. The school remained on the Shreveport Highway until 1915. The teachers who taught in those early buildings were Parson Alford, Whistling Jones, Lee Tidwell, W.R. Frederick, Chester White, William Kennedy, S.B. Sprandlin, S.S. Lattimore, Will Rochelle, Miss Donnie Bussie, Miss Naomi Morse, and Mrs. L.R. Nash.

The Carmichael Hill School was a part of Liberty District and was organized in 1904. The land was purchased from M.D. Tilson and a one-room frame building was erected. The school house was destroyed by fire five years later and another was erected. It was necessary to raise funds for both the building and grounds. T.E. Elliott, A.J. Braswell, Pete Walraven, and J.B. Selman were appointed as a building committee. A house costing approximately $800 was built and remained in use until 1915. The following teachers taught in the school: Miss Hazel Moss, Miss Carman Morse, Miss Birdie Blow, Miss Inez Bentley, and Miss Donnie Bussie.

Liberty School number two or the Bearden School, was organized about 1904. It was located on the Jew Farm Lane about one-half mile west of the Buchanan Road. Mr. Bearden gave the land and a building was erected in the summer of 1904. This school consolidated with Liberty School number one in 1915. Tom Bob Nelson, William Kennedy, Miss Arra Kennedy, and Chester White were some of the teachers. The trustees were: R.C. Mauldin, J.N. Sherrer, Dan Lucower, and Mr. Walraven.

In 1915, when Carmichael Hill, Liberty and the Bearden School voted to consolidate, bonds for $10,000 were voted and a brick building with six rooms and a small auditorium were built. The pupils were transported to the new school by wagons.

Mrs. L.R. Nash was the first principal to direct the new school. Everyone was pleased with the new school and it continued to grow, until it was necessary to make an addition to the building. In 1928, $14,000 more bonds were voted and two more classrooms were added, the auditorium was made larger, and a stage and dressing rooms were built. The building was made modern in every way. The district had an area of eleven square miles. The school was standardized in 1930, and during the school year of 1934–1935 it applied for and secured a classification as a two-year high school. At this time the tax rate of $1.00 was divided: 75¢ for local maintenance and 25¢ for bonds.

In 1941 Buchanan School was consolidated with Liberty. The school and community continued to grow and new brick classrooms and cafeteria buildings were added. In 1955 Liberty and Eylau Schools consolidated, and the Liberty School became the Intermediate Campus of the Liberty Eylau School System. Mr. C. A. Shipp was the principal.

=== Eylau ===
In the fall of 1886 a mere handful of children gathered at the Methodist church to attend the first school ever taught in the Eylau community. The surrounding country was sparsely settled and there were only two houses between Eylau and Texarkana.

Adjoining the south side of the community was a small school known as the Carl Akin School. Since pupils were few, interest lacking, and the school spirit low at this school, it was decided to attempt to move this school to Eylau and build a new school building. Mr. L.H. Sorsby and Mr. R.L. Nelson led the fight for the union of the two schools and in 1886 a majority voted for the move. Blue Matthews, a sawmill owner, donated an acre of ground from the M.H Janes headright survey for this building. The building and the furniture were very crude. The seats were long, straight backed, home-made benches and as one old timer declares, “very hard, straight, and uncomfortable.” Drinking water was obtained from the nearby branch until the following year when a well was dug.

Some of the teachers of this early school were Mr. Wilson, Mr. Holt, and Mr. W.M. Kennedy. The length of the term was usually seven months, with very lucrative salaries ranging from $20 to $60 per month.

The next school building was a one-room building erected by the patrons of the community under the supervision of J.C.C. Morrow and it was used as a combination school and church.

In 1889 the community voted the constitutional limit in taxes (50¢) and awarded the contract to G.A. Richardson to erect a building thirty feet by forty-five feet. Since only 25¢ of the tax rate could be used for building, public subscriptions were taken and the largest individual donation, $10, was made by J.S. Casey. This building was equipped with modern desks and a teacher's desk and chair.

The school grew in size until another teacher was needed, and a thirty feet by thirty feet addition was made to the building. In this school, grades one to eight inclusive were taught by such outstanding teachers as C.A. Bonham, Beulah Nelson, S.B. Gee, Clara Nelson, Elizabeth Henry, Carrie Mae Henry, Helen Bently, J.H. Sturgeon, Mrs. W.H. Britt, Miss Emma Russell, W.M. Harrell, L.L. Chapman, and Mrs. L.L. Chapman.

In 1917 the school had outgrown the old building, and bonds in the amount of $3,500 were voted and the contract awarded to G.A. Richardson to build and equip a modern school building of three classrooms, with a library and storeroom. The building served the community for ten years with such teachers as L.L. Chapman, Mrs. L.L. Chapman, Inez Clark, J.H. Pattilo, D.R. Carpenter, Gladys McLean, Lula Mae Old, Bertha Tanner, L.R. Harland, Lela Thornton, R.O. Bennett, Helen Whitemeir, Lena Moores, Mrs. Nan Berry, Mrs. Annie Robinson, Miss Nora Wells, L.H. Griffin, and Mrs. Ruby Defee.

The changing of the route of Highway 47 and the growth of the community created a desire to move the school building to the highway. In 1929 a bond issue of $10,000 was voted to build and equip a modern brick building of five classrooms, an office, a library, and a large auditorium. This building was placed on a beautiful eleven-acre tract of land and was the pride of the community.

In 1931 Moores District consolidated with Eylau for high school purposes, and in 1935 the two districts voted a complete consolidation. The first faculty in the new building was L.H. Griffin, Hattie Cheyne, Ruby Defee, Mrs. A.C. Nelson, and Mrs. Annie Robinson. At various times replacements or additions were made by Nelia Mae Allen, Juanita Holmes, Mrs. Bennie Morgan, H.E. Markham, R.C. Rachel, Myrtle Jeffiers, Cecilia Henson, Mrs. H.E. Markham, Estella Goree, and Carlene Maxwell.

In 1936 the school had an average enrollment of 185, a faculty of seven, a district area that covered 28.92 square miles, with a valuation of $221,593. The school was classed as a junior high school by the State Department of Education. The students who completed the junior high school were transported by bus to Texarkana Senior High School, where all fixed charges were paid by the school district and the State. Credit for the beautification of the school ground and the installation of much of the equipment of the school went to a very active parent-teacher association. Mrs. Bryant Holmes was president of the first Mothers' Club, which was organized at Eylau in 1907.

The brick school burned in March 1938, and for the remainder of that year and the 1939 school year the students attended classes in the Christian church and the Methodist church. The stone school on Highway 59 was completed in 1939 just in time for graduation exercises to be held on the front steps. The same day, the building which was built by the Work Projects Administration was dedicated with Congressman Wright Patman in attendance.

Mr. Bender and Mr. Markham talked about consolidation first in 1933 then again in 1946 and up until 1955 when the two schools finally consolidated and became a four year high school. At the time of consolidation Mr. H.E. Markham was the principal. There is a baseball field park in his honor.

The phenomenal growth of the Eylau school was due partly to the growth of the community, but largely to the broad vision of the board members who had so unselfishly devoted their time to the school affairs. The roll of trustees include such outstanding men as L.H. Sorsby, R.L. Nelson, Seldon Morrow, G.A. Richardson, B.F. Eubanks, A.L. Patterson, C.K. Rachel, John Sherer, F.M. James, J.F. Fetters, J.D. Preston, W.A. Eubanks, W.L. Harland, W.C. Shipp, T.M. Elliott, John Adair, H.G. Stroupe, W.J. Mangum, R.F. Daniel, B.O. Hickerson, W.E. Chance, Bryant Holmes, C.M. Rathburn, T.A. Hines, J.F. Hughes, Walter Crider, W.B. Hines, D.A. Vaughn, A.B. Black, J. Chalker, T. Kesterson, Jack Flody, J.C. Smith, Grady Black, and many others.

=== Buchanan ===
The first Buchanan school was located about five miles southwest of Texarkana. It was a subscription school built by Mr. Kirby who operated a sawmill in the community. He realized the advantages children received from education, and he paid the tuition of the children who worked at the mill. All other children of the community could attend if they would pay their own tuition. This was prior to 1870 because the mill closed sometime between 1870 and 1880. Soon after this mill ceased operations another mill was built by the father of William Buchanan. The community was named in honor of Mr. Buchanan.

In 1882 a common school district was formed with a school building located one mile south of the intersection of Kings Highway and Farm Road 2516. This was a very crude, one room, twenty feet by thirty feet boxed house. All furniture was homemade and consisted mostly of just plain bench seats. Boards were hinged to the walls so that they could be propped up level to be used for writing purposes. The pupils stood to take their penmanship lessons on these boards. Professor Cleveland and Mr. Hartsell were two teachers that taught in this school.

The school was next moved near the sawmill where a building that had served as a skating-rink was used for a schoolhouse and also to house a meat market. Some of the trustees who served during this time were A.L. Shipp, T.A. Crump, Mr. Vaughn, and Mr. Morphew. Some of the teachers who taught at this school were Mr. Hutsell, Miss Jennie Stuckey, John Towery, Mrs. Flora Kirby, and Miss Florence Malaby. Mr. Hutsell was almost deaf, so his wife was employed to assist him with his work. They received the very princely salary of $25 per month.

In 1894 the school was moved to the Hargis corner. It is recalled that Charles Strawn taught school at this place for the one year that it existed. The next year a bitter fight was waged to move the building again and it was rumored that a man was given a 24-pound sack of flour to burn the old building so that it would be possible to build on a different site.

The next site selected was at Shipp's Crossing; this site was used permanently for school purposes. Some of the trustees at this time were J.S. Hargis, W.S. Kirby, and E.C. Kirby. The first teacher at this school, Charlie (Cat Fish) Miller, was termed the pioneer teacher. Other teachers at this place were Chester Brower, Miss Jennie Mitchell, Miss Imogene Berry Cooper, Mr. Kennedy, Mrs. L.R. Nash, and Miss Bess Stephens. The teachers had approximately eighty pupils and when they were asked how many grades they taught they said “three – the 3 R’s.”

In 1907–1908 the district was changed from a common school district to an independent school district. One of the earlier teachers in this district was J.I. Wheeler, who had one assistant, and this assistant was paid by money raised in the community.

In 1909 it was decided that the district needed another school so Buchanan school number two was built on the Ryan Place about three miles west of the other school. Helen Bentley was the first teacher at the new school and was followed by Gena Williams, Virginia Kerns, Clyde Merritt, Mattie Williams, Agnes Leach, J.W. Patillo, Annie Robinson, Mrs. McWhorter, Mrs. L.L. Goodwin, and Laura Proctor. Some of the trustees during this time were Mr. Williams, V.L. Ryan, W.H. Lynch, L.N. Giles, A.V. Crump, J.S. Hargis, and J.L. Butner.

In 1910 still another school was added to the schools operated by the district. This third school was added to the schools operated by the district. This third school, Rocky Ford, was built on the L.S. Kennedy place. After four years of service, this school was consolidated by the school board with school number one. The teachers for this school were M.D. Taylor, Gena Williams, and Emma Jarrett.

In 1927 the district voted school house bonds and erected a modern five room building. The Buchanan number two consolidated with number one and Mr. Harland transported the children in his car and this was known as the first school bus in the district. Eight grades were taught at the school, two grades to the room. Some of the teachers were Mrs. Goodwin, Mrs. Homer Kirby, Mrs. Renolds, Mrs. Karrh, and Mr. Karrh, the principal. In 1941 Buchanan was consolidated with Liberty.

=== Macedonia ===
In the latter part of the 19th century Macedonia school was formed. It was a one-room, one teacher school. In 1961 Macedonia became part of the Liberty Eylau school system. It was at that time an accredited high school with 24 teachers and a $250,000 building complex. In 1969 the schools in the Liberty Eylau district were completely integrated and the Macedonia campus became the Liberty Eylau Junior High School.

== Awards ==
- 2006 Baseball State Champions 2009 & 2010 Girls AAA State Track Champions 2010 Girls AAA Basketball State Champions
- 2008 National Blue Ribbon School
