= De Kalb, Texas =

- City
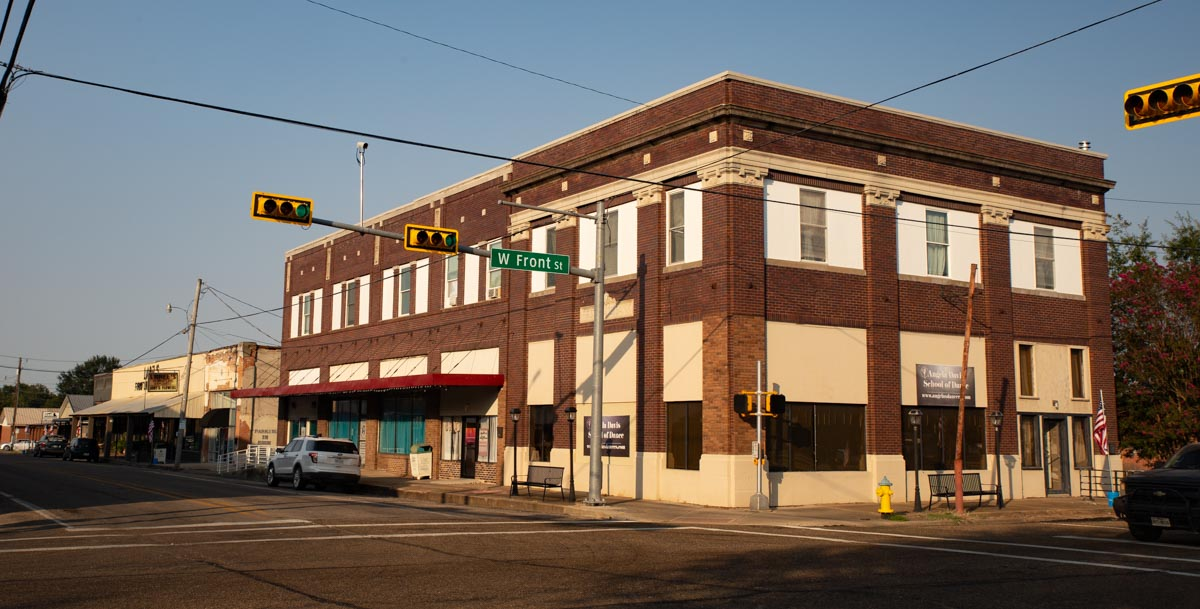
- Downtown De Kalb
- Motto: "Opportunity. Innovation"
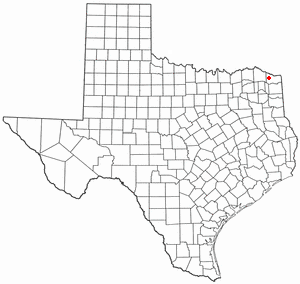
- Location of De Kalb, Texas

- Coordinates: 33°30′25″N 94°36′59″W
- Country: United States
- State: Texas
- County: Bowie
- Named for: Johann de Kalb

Area
  - Total: 1.37 sq mi (3.55 km^{2})
  - Land: 1.37 sq mi (3.55 km^{2})
  - Water: 0 sq mi (0.00 km^{2})
- Elevation: 410 ft (120 m)

Population (2020)
  - Total: 1,527
  - Density: 1,163.6/sq mi (449.28/km^{2})
- Time zone: UTC-6 (Central (CST))
  - Summer (DST): UTC-5 (CDT)
- ZIP code: 75559
- Area codes: 903, 430
- FIPS code: 48-19648
- GNIS feature ID: 2410303
- Website: dekalbtx.org

De Kalb (/dɪ ˈkæb/ di KAB) is a city in Bowie County, Texas, United States; it is part of the Texarkana metropolitan statistical area. Its two area codes are 430 and 903. Its ZIP code is 75559. It is in the Central Time Zone, and its population was 1,527 at the 2020 United States census.

== History ==
On December 31, 1985, around 5:14 pm, a Douglas DC-3 private aircraft, N711Y, owned by Ricky Nelson, with a pilot, copilot, and seven passengers, including Nelson, his fiancée, and five members of his band, crashed in a wooded area near De Kalb. The plane was on a flight from Guntersville, Alabama, to Dallas, Texas, where Nelson was scheduled to appear at a New Year's Eve performance. All seven passengers were killed in the accident when the plane caught fire. The pilot and copilot were able to escape and survived.

On May 4, 1999, De Kalb took a direct hit to the downtown area from an EF-3 tornado. https://data.elpasotimes.com/tornado-archive/texas/5696338/

== Geography ==
According to the United States Census Bureau, the city has a total area of 1.3 square miles (3.4 km^{2}), all land.

The climate in this area is characterized by hot, humid summers (average of 30 or more days of 100°F or more) and generally mild to cool winters. According to the Köppen climate classification, De Kalb has a humid subtropical climate, Cfa on climate maps.

== Demographics ==
Historical population
Census	Pop.	Note	%±
1890	420		—
1920	910		—
1930	1,023		12.4%
1940	1,287		25.8%
1950	1,928		49.8%
1960	2,042		5.9%
1970	2,197		7.6%
1980	2,217		0.9%
1990	1,976		−10.9%
2000	1,769		−10.5%
2010	1,699		−4.0%
2020	1,527		−10.1%
U.S. Decennial Census; 1850–1900 1910; 1920 1930 1940; 1950 1960 1970; 1980 1990 2000; 2010

=== 2020 census ===
As of the 2020 census, 1,527 people, 630 households, and 362 families were residing in the city. The median age was 41.8 years. 25.6% of residents were under the age of 18 and 24.3% of residents were 65 years of age or older. For every 100 females there were 82.7 males, and for every 100 females age 18 and over there were 78.6 males age 18 and over.

0.0% of residents lived in urban areas, while 100.0% lived in rural areas.

There were 630 households in De Kalb, of which 30.8% had children under the age of 18 living in them. Of all households, 34.6% were married-couple households, 18.6% were households with a male householder and no spouse or partner present, and 40.0% were households with a female householder and no spouse or partner present. About 35.4% of all households were made up of individuals and 17.6% had someone living alone who was 65 years of age or older.

There were 754 housing units, of which 16.4% were vacant. The homeowner vacancy rate was 2.2% and the rental vacancy rate was 7.1%.

Racial composition as of the 2020 census
Race	Number	Percent
White	943	61.8%
Black or African American	378	24.8%
American Indian and Alaska Native	18	1.2%
Asian	16	1.0%
Native Hawaiian and Other Pacific Islander	3	0.2%
Some other race	73	4.8%
Two or more races	96	6.3%
Hispanic or Latino (of any race)	147	9.6%

=== 2000 census ===
As of the 2000 census, 1,769 people, 725 households, and 477 families lived in the city. The population density was 1,349.1 inhabitants per square mile (520.9/km^{2}). The 853 housing units had an average density of 650.5 per square mile (251.2/km^{2}). The racial makeup of the city was 66.70% White, 30.81% African American, 0.57% Native American, 0.06% Asian, 0.68% from other races, and 1.19% from two or more races. Hispanics or Latinos of any race were 2.43% of the population.

The median income in the city for a household was $23,713 and for a family was $32,212 at the 2000 census. Males had a median income of $27,955 versus $20,750 for females. The per capita income for the city was $14,360. About 25.3% of families and 28.3% of the population were below the poverty line, including 44.3% of those under 18 and 25.0% of those 65 or over.

=== 2020 American Community Survey estimates ===
By the publication of the 2020 census estimates, the median household income increased to $34,178. There was a mean income of $55,765 according to census estimates.

== Education ==
The city of De Kalb is served by the De Kalb Independent School District.

The communities of Hubbard and Dalby Springs lie south of De Kalb on US Highway 259, and most children attend the De Kalb ISD school system; but Hubbard does have its own small school district, serving prekindergarten through eighth grades. Some children elect to attend Hubbard in their formative years.

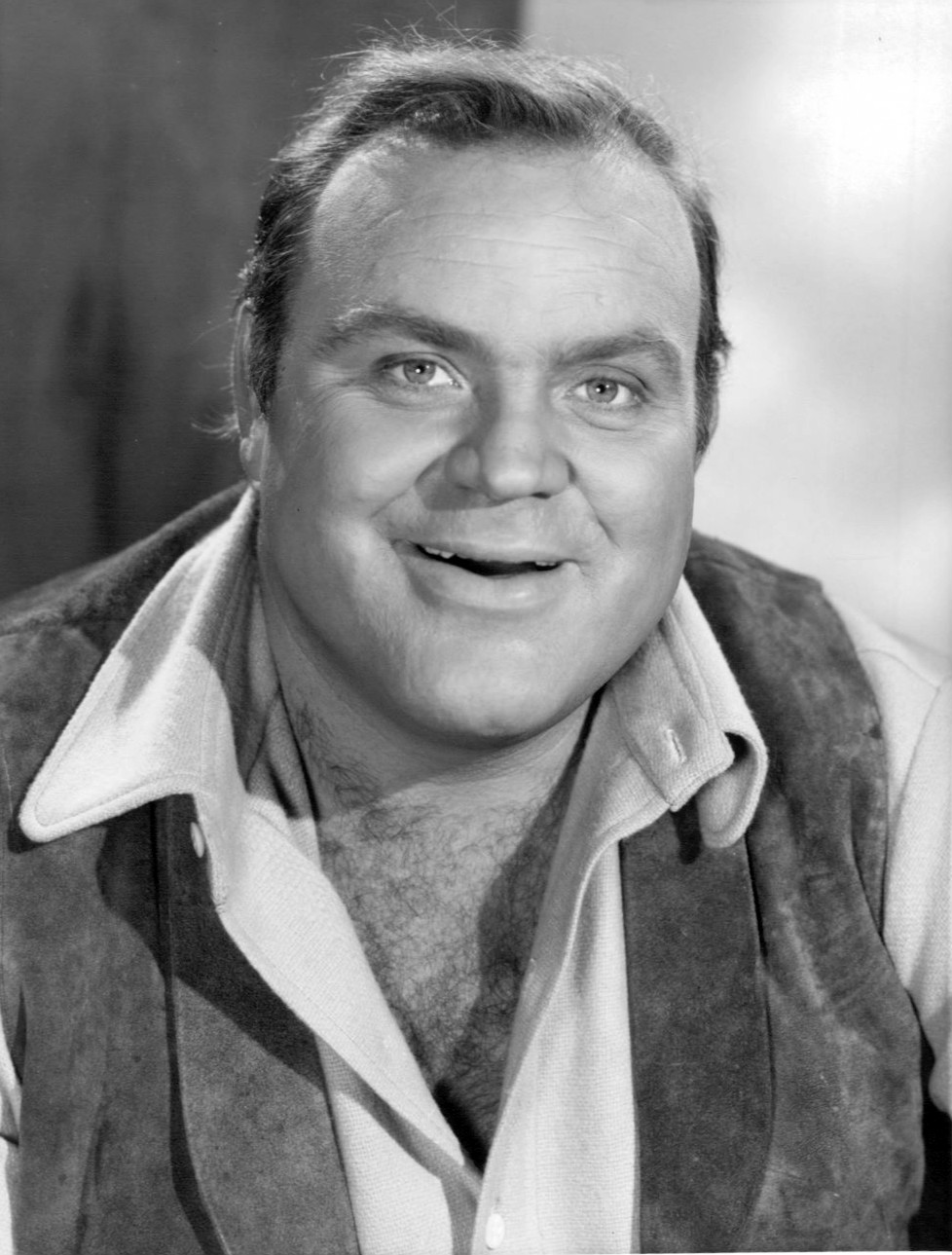
Dan Blocker was born in De Kalb.

== Notable people ==
- Dan Blocker, birthplace of Bonanza star who played the character "Hoss Cartwright" on the NBC television Western series
- Terrance Ganaway, former NFL running back
- Al Perkins is a musician, singer-songwriter, and producer
- Timothy Rhea, director of bands and music activities at Texas A&M University and a former president of the American Bandmasters Association, graduated from De Kalb High School
- Luke Walker is a former pitcher in Major League Baseball who played for the Pittsburgh Pirates (1965–1966 and 1968–1973) and Detroit Tigers (1974)
