= Simms Independent School District =

School district in Texas

- Simms, Bowie, Texas

District information
- Grades: PK-12
- Schools: 3

Other information
- Website: https://www.simmsisd.net/

Simms Independent School District is a public school district based in the community of Simms, Texas (USA). In 2009, the school district was rated "recognized" by the Texas Education Agency.

== Schools ==
- James Bowie High School (Grades 9‍–‍12)

During 2022‍–‍2023, James Bowie High School had an enrollment of 140 students in grades 9‍–‍12 and a student to teacher ratio of 7.1.

- James Bowie Middle School (Grades 6‍–‍8)

During 2022‍–‍2023, James Bowie Middle School had an enrollment of 132 students in grades 6‍–‍8 and a student to teacher ratio of 10.36.

- James Bowie Elementary School (Grades PK‍–‍5)

During 2022‍–‍2023, James Bowie Elementary School had an enrollment of 212 students in grades PK‍–‍5 and a student to teacher ratio of 12.76.

== Controversy ==
In July 2024, the ACLU of Texas sent Simms Independent School District a letter, alleging that the district's 2023‍–‍2024 dress and grooming code appeared to violate the Texas CROWN Act, a state law which prohibits racial discrimination based on hair texture or styles, and asking the district to revise its policies for the 2024‍–‍2025 school year.
