= Texarkana, Texas =

City in Texas, United States

Texarkana
- City
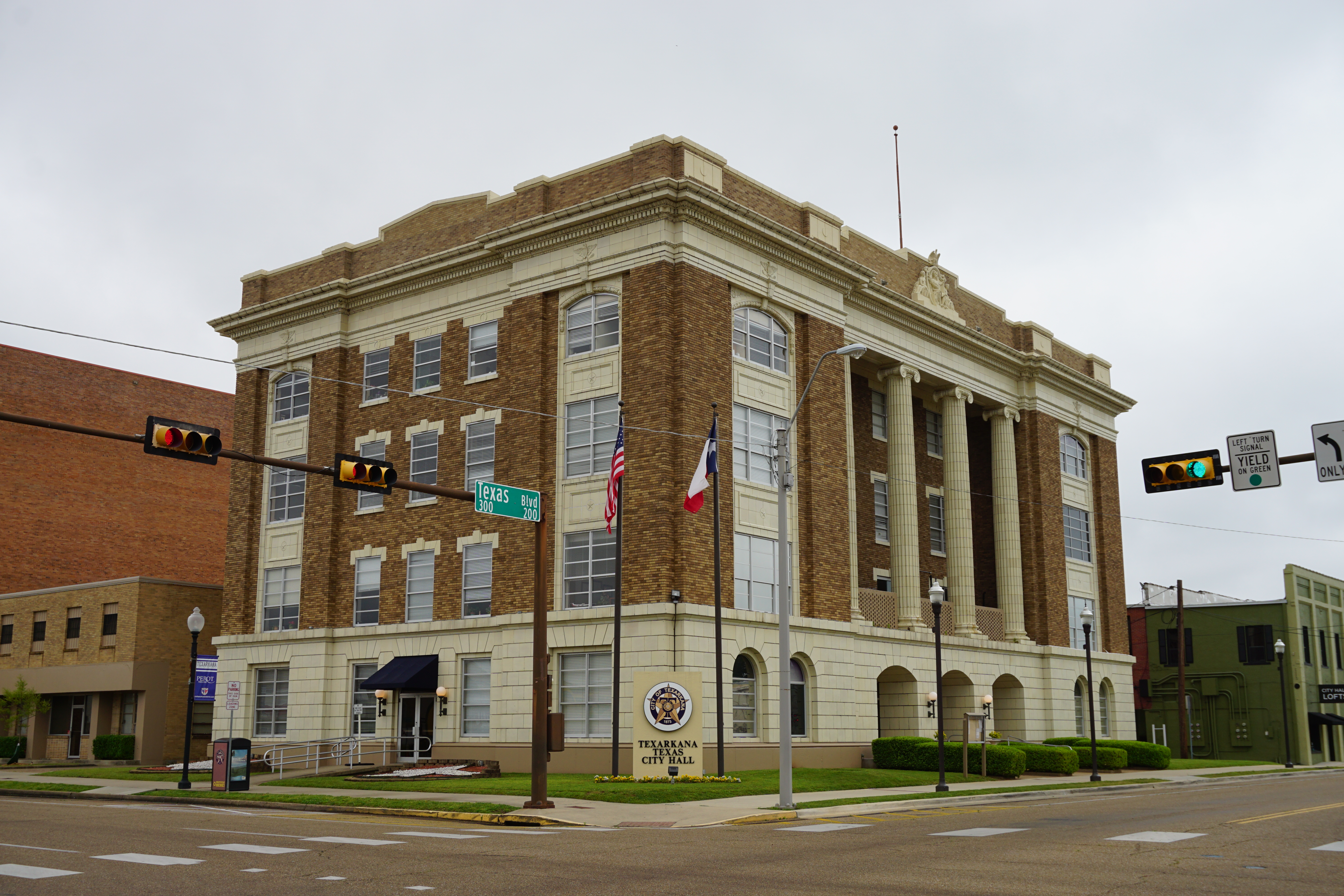
- Texarkana Texas City Hall

- Seal
- Nicknames: The Texas Side, T-Town, TK, Kana, Twin City
- Motto: Twice as Nice
- Location of Texarkana, Texas

- Location within Texas Location within the United States Texarkana (North America) Texarkana (America) Texarkana (Earth)
- Coordinates: 33°28′34″N 94°06′30″W
- Country: United States
- State: Texas
- County: Bowie
- Established: December 8, 1873 / June 12, 1874

Government
  - Type: Council-Manager
  - Mayor: Bob Bruggeman

Area
  - Total: 29.47 sq mi (76.33 km^{2})
  - Land: 29.03 sq mi (75.20 km^{2})
  - Water: 0.44 sq mi (1.13 km^{2})
- Elevation: 325 ft (99 m)

Population (2020)
  - Total: 36,193
  - Density: 1,228.1/sq mi (474.16/km^{2})
- Time zone: UTC−6 (Central (CST))
  - Summer (DST): UTC−5 (CDT)
- ZIP codes: 755XX.
- Area codes: 903, 430
- FIPS code: 48-72368
- GNIS feature ID: 2412054
- Website: texarkanatexas.gov

Texarkana is a city in Bowie County, Texas, United States, in the Ark-La-Tex region. Located approximately 180 miles (290 km) from Dallas, Texarkana is a twin city with neighboring Texarkana, Arkansas. The Texas city's population was 36,193 at the 2020 census.

The city and its Arkansas counterpart form the core of the Texarkana metropolitan statistical area, encompassing all of Bowie County, Texas, and Miller County, Arkansas. The two cities had a combined population of 65,580 in the 2020 decennial census, and the metropolitan area had a population of 149,482.

== History ==
Railroads were quick to see the possibilities of connecting markets in this vast area. In the late 1850s, the builders of the Cairo and Fulton Railroad were pushing their line steadily south across Arkansas. By 1874, they crossed the Red River and reached the Texas state line. Between February 16 and March 19, 1874, trains ran between the Texas border and the Red River, whence passengers and freight were ferried north to Fulton, Arkansas to continue by rail. The Red River Bridge opened on March 20, 1874. Since then, trains have run directly from Texarkana to St. Louis, Missouri.

Keen rivalry existed between the 1870s railroad builders. The Texas and Pacific Railroad reached across Texas to the Arkansas state line. The border was the logical place for the different railways to connect. On December 8, 1873, the Texas and Pacific sold the first town lots for the future city. The first buyer was J. W. Davis, who purchased the land where today's Hotel McCartney now stands on the Texas side of the border, opposite Union Station which is split between Arkansas and Texas.

== Etymology ==
The name Texarkana is known to be a portmanteau of Texas, Arkansas, and nearby Louisiana. However, accounts of the name's origin differ, and it had been in use some time before the town was founded. The most popular tradition is that when the St. Louis, Iron Mountain and Southern Railway was building its line through the area, Col. Gus Knobel, a railroad surveyor, coined the name. He is said to have painted it on a plank and nailed it to a tree, saying "This is the name of a town which is to be built here." Another story tells of a Red River steamboat named The Texarkana, c. 1860. A third account relates that a storekeeper named Swindle in Red Land, Louisiana, concocted a drink called "Texarkana Bitters".

== Geography ==
Texarkana is located at the junction of Interstate 30 and US highways 59, 67, 71 and 82 in extreme northeastern Texas on the Texas-Arkansas border. It is bordered by the city of Texarkana, Arkansas, to the east, and by the smaller cities of Nash, Wake Village and Liberty Eylau, Texas to the west. It is in the Central Time Zone.

According to the United States Census Bureau, the Texas city has a total area of 29.5 square miles (76.3 km^{2}), of which 29.0 square miles (75.2 km^{2}) is land and 0.42 square miles (1.1 km^{2}), or 1.39%, is covered by water. The city is roughly 180 miles northeast of Dallas.

Several creeks run through the area including Wagner Creek, Cowhorn Creek, Swampoodle Creek and Days Creek.

=== Climate ===
- The warmest month is August.
- The highest recorded temperature was 117 °F (47 °C) in 1936.
- On average, the coolest month is January.
- The lowest recorded temperature was –6 °F (–21 °C) on December 22–23, 1989.
- The most precipitation on average occurs in December.
- A humid subtropical climate (Cfa) exists in the region.

Climate data for Texarkana, Texas (1991–2020 normals, extremes 1968–present)
Month	Jan	Feb	Mar	Apr	May	Jun	Jul	Aug	Sep	Oct	Nov	Dec	Year
Record high °F (°C)	81 (27)	89 (32)	89 (32)	95 (35)	98 (37)	105 (41)	105 (41)	112 (44)	108 (42)	95 (35)	87 (31)	83 (28)	112 (44)
Mean maximum °F (°C)	73.3 (22.9)	76.9 (24.9)	83.6 (28.7)	86.9 (30.5)	91.1 (32.8)	95.8 (35.4)	99.9 (37.7)	100.8 (38.2)	97.2 (36.2)	89.7 (32.1)	80.1 (26.7)	74.8 (23.8)	102.0 (38.9)
Mean daily maximum °F (°C)	54.3 (12.4)	58.6 (14.8)	66.7 (19.3)	74.8 (23.8)	82.0 (27.8)	89.3 (31.8)	93.3 (34.1)	93.5 (34.2)	87.2 (30.7)	76.7 (24.8)	64.8 (18.2)	56.3 (13.5)	74.8 (23.8)
Daily mean °F (°C)	43.7 (6.5)	47.6 (8.7)	55.2 (12.9)	63.1 (17.3)	71.8 (22.1)	79.6 (26.4)	83.2 (28.4)	82.8 (28.2)	76.2 (24.6)	64.9 (18.3)	53.6 (12.0)	46.1 (7.8)	64.0 (17.8)
Mean daily minimum °F (°C)	33.1 (0.6)	36.6 (2.6)	43.8 (6.6)	51.4 (10.8)	61.7 (16.5)	69.8 (21.0)	73.0 (22.8)	72.1 (22.3)	65.2 (18.4)	53.2 (11.8)	42.4 (5.8)	35.8 (2.1)	53.2 (11.8)
Mean minimum °F (°C)	19.8 (−6.8)	24.9 (−3.9)	29.2 (−1.6)	37.7 (3.2)	48.7 (9.3)	61.8 (16.6)	67.3 (19.6)	65.8 (18.8)	53.4 (11.9)	38.9 (3.8)	28.8 (−1.8)	23.9 (−4.5)	17.9 (−7.8)
Record low °F (°C)	2 (−17)	−3 (−19)	15 (−9)	28 (−2)	38 (3)	52 (11)	57 (14)	55 (13)	38 (3)	27 (−3)	16 (−9)	−6 (−21)	−6 (−21)
Average precipitation inches (mm)	4.26 (108)	4.58 (116)	4.70 (119)	4.88 (124)	5.25 (133)	4.39 (112)	3.40 (86)	2.77 (70)	3.89 (99)	4.78 (121)	4.33 (110)	5.18 (132)	52.41 (1,331)
Average snowfall inches (cm)	1.0 (2.5)	1.0 (2.5)	0.0 (0.0)	0.0 (0.0)	0.0 (0.0)	0.0 (0.0)	0.0 (0.0)	0.0 (0.0)	0.0 (0.0)	0.0 (0.0)	0.0 (0.0)	0.1 (0.25)	2.1 (5.3)
Average precipitation days (≥ 0.01 in)	11.0	11.2	10.8	9.7	10.3	8.5	6.8	6.5	6.7	8.6	9.1	10.6	109.8
Average snowy days (≥ 0.1 in)	0.3	0.4	0.0	0.0	0.0	0.0	0.0	0.0	0.0	0.0	0.0	0.1	0.8
Source: NOAA

On May 22, 2008, a microburst producing winds up to 100 mph occurred over Stateline Avenue and surrounding communities. An analysis of radar data leading up to the damage showed that two severe thunderstorms came together on the south side of the city. One severe storm was moving northeastward from southern Bowie County, while the other was moving northwestward through Miller County. Both storms collided in an area just south of downtown Texarkana.

On May 16, 2020, a waterspout tornado formed in adjacent Lake Wright Patman.

On December 31, 2021, a rare weather phenomenon called "animal rain" caused fish to fall out of the sky and land in yards, on sidewalks and in business lots.

== Demographics ==
Historical population
Census	Pop.	Note	%±
1880	1,833		—
1890	2,852		55.6%
1900	5,256		84.3%
1910	9,790		86.3%
1920	11,480		17.3%
1930	16,602		44.6%
1940	17,019		2.5%
1950	24,753		45.4%
1960	30,218		22.1%
1970	30,497		0.9%
1980	31,271		2.5%
1990	31,656		1.2%
2000	34,782		9.9%
2010	36,411		4.7%
2020	36,193		−0.6%
U.S. Decennial Census; 1850–1900 1910; 1920 1930 1940; 1950 1960 1970; 1980 1990 2000; 2010

=== Racial and ethnic composition ===
Texarkana city, Texas – Racial and ethnic composition Note: the US Census treats Hispanic/Latino as an ethnic category. This table excludes Latinos from the racial categories and assigns them to a separate category. Hispanics/Latinos may be of any race.
Race / Ethnicity (NH = Non-Hispanic)	Pop 2000	Pop 2010	Pop 2020	% 2000	% 2010	% 2020
White alone (NH)	20,220	19,345	16,825	58.13%	53.13%	46.49%
Black or African American alone (NH)	12,816	13,438	13,565	36.85%	36.91%	37.48%
Native American or Alaska Native alone (NH)	109	147	164	0.31%	0.40%	0.45%
Asian alone (NH)	246	484	736	0.71%	1.33%	2.03%
Native Hawaiian or Pacific Islander alone (NH)	14	9	25	0.04%	0.02%	0.07%
Other race alone (NH)	20	40	173	0.06%	0.11%	0.48%
Mixed race or Multiracial (NH)	345	612	1,613	0.99%	1.68%	4.46%
Hispanic or Latino (any race)	1,012	2,336	3,092	2.91%	6.42%	8.54%
Total	34,782	36,411	36,193	100.00%	100.00%	100.00%

=== 2020 census ===
As of the 2020 census, Texarkana had a population of 36,193, 14,408 households, and 8,767 families residing in the city. The population density was 1,228.13 inhabitants per square mile (474.18/km^{2}), and the average household size was 2.42 while the average family size was 3.01.

The median age was 37.8 years; 24.9% of residents were under the age of 18, 10.0% were between 18 and 24, 27.6% were from 25 to 44, 20.7% were from 45 to 64, and 17.4% were 65 years of age or older. For every 100 females there were 89.1 males, and for every 100 females age 18 and over there were 85.4 males age 18 and over.

Of those households, 31.8% had children under the age of 18 living in them. Of all households, 34.3% were married-couple households, 20.1% were households with a male householder and no spouse or partner present, and 39.4% were households with a female householder and no spouse or partner present. About 33.7% of all households were made up of individuals and 13.2% had someone living alone who was 65 years of age or older.

There were 16,270 housing units, of which 11.4% were vacant. The homeowner vacancy rate was 2.1% and the rental vacancy rate was 10.5%. The housing units averaged 589.4 per square mile (227.5/km^{2}).

99.3% of residents lived in urban areas, while 0.7% lived in rural areas.

=== 2000 census ===
The median income for a household in the city was $29,727, and for a family was $39,119. Males had a median income of $34,155 versus $21,143 for females. The per capita income for the city was $17,815. About 19.4% of families and 24.0% of the population were below the poverty line, including 34.8% of those under age 18 and 13.2% of those age 65 or over. The most affluent area of Texarkana is Pleasant Grove, where the median income is $49,562 for each household and the median for a family is $57,219 in 2013.

== Economy ==
According to the city's 2021 Annual Comprehensive Financial Report, the top employers in the Texarkana Metropolitan Statistical Area, are:

#	Employer	# of Employees
1	Red River Army Depot and tenants	2,225
2	Christus St. Michael Health Care	1,800
3	Cooper Tire & Rubber Company	1,793
4	Wal-Mart/Sam's Club	875
5	Texarkana Independent School District	846
6	Graphic Packaging (International Paper)	829
7	Wadley Regional Medical Center	652
8	Domtar	548
9	Texarkana Arkansas School District	370
10	City of Texarkana, Texas	365

== Government ==
=== Local government ===
According to the city's most recent Comprehensive Annual Financial Report Fund Financial Statements, the city's various funds had $36.0 million in revenues, $37.0 million in expenditures, $18.9 million in total assets, $3.5 million in total liabilities, and $7.2 million in investments.

=== State government ===
Though the city was historically Democratic, Texarkana is currently represented by Republicans in both houses of the Texas State Legislature. The state senator is Bryan Hughes from District 1. State Representative Gary VanDeaver represents Texas House District 1.

The Texas Department of Criminal Justice operates the Texarkana District Parole Office in Texarkana.

The Texas Sixth Court of Appeals is located downtown in the Bi-State Justice Building.

=== Federal government ===
At the federal level, the two U.S. senators from Texas are Republicans John Cornyn and Ted Cruz; since a remap in 2022, the city of Texarkana is part of Texas's 1st congressional district, which is currently represented by Republican Nathaniel Moran. Much of the rest of Bowie County is in Texas's 4th congressional district.

The Federal Courthouse (which also holds the downtown post office) is located directly on the Arkansas–Texas state line and is the only federal office building to straddle a state line. During his campaign for the presidency, John F. Kennedy spoke on the steps of the courthouse September 13, 1960, and so did President Jimmy Carter, on October 22, 1980.

The Federal Correctional Institution, Texarkana, is a Federal Bureau of Prisons facility in unincorporated Bowie County just outside the southwest border of the city.

== Education ==
=== Public school districts ===
Different portions of the city limits are under the jurisdiction of the Texarkana Independent School District, the Liberty-Eylau Independent School District, Pleasant Grove Independent School District, and Red Lick Independent School District.

=== Colleges and universities ===
Texarkana is home to Texas A&M University–Texarkana, a four-year branch of the Texas A&M University System, and to Texarkana College, a community college.

== Media ==
=== Television ===
Texarkana is part of the Shreveport-Texarkana media market, the 89th largest media market in the country and second-largest in the state of Louisiana, behind only New Orleans. The market's NBC affiliate, KTAL-TV 6, is licensed to Texarkana. Texarkana is also served by KTBS-TV 3 (ABC), KSLA 12 (CBS), KTSH-CD 19 (Telemundo), KPXJ 21 (CW), KMSS-TV 33 (Fox), KSHV-TV 45 (MyNetworkTV), and two PBS member stations: KETG 9 and KLTS-TV 24.

=== Radio ===
4 AM radio stations and 19 FM stations (including a LPFM) serve Texarkana. Although most stations are locally owned, Townsquare Media has a cluster in the area.

== Infrastructure ==
=== Transportation ===
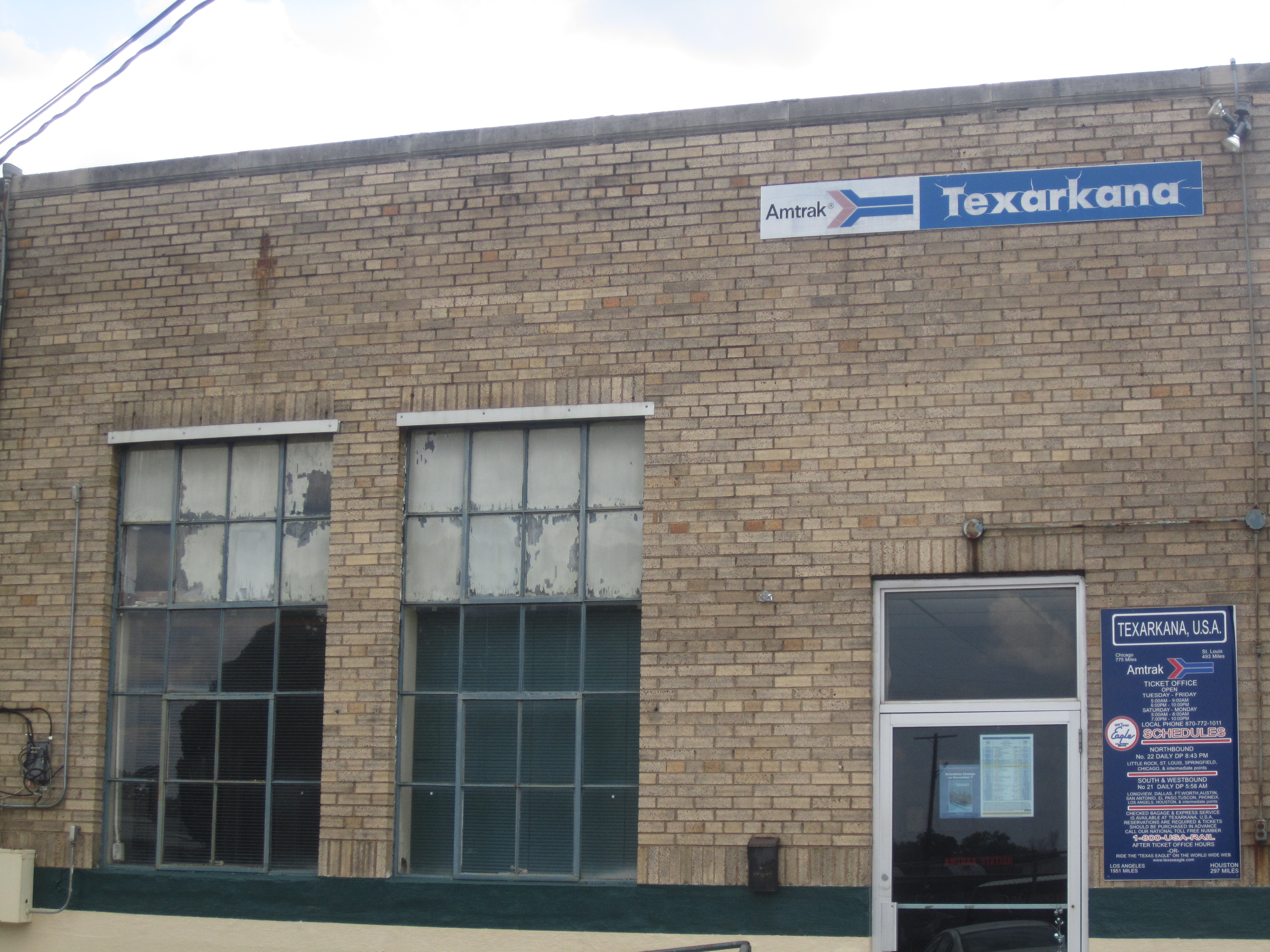
Amtrak station in Texarkana, 2012

Texarkana Regional Airport is located in Texarkana, Arkansas, and serves general aviation and American Eagle service to Dallas/Fort Worth International Airport.

Texarkana Union Station is located in downtown Texarkana, along the state line. Amtrak's Texas Eagle provides a daily rail service, east to Chicago and west to San Antonio, continuing on to Los Angeles three days a week, with intermediate stops.

The Texarkana Urban Transit District provides bus transportation to major areas of town along nine different routes. Service runs from 5:30 am to 6:20 pm Monday–Saturday.

Intercity bus service to the city is provided by Jefferson Lines.

Interstate 30 passes through Texarkana on the north. Loop 151 on the west of the city forms part of the Texarkana Loop, a three-quarter loop around the west, south, and east of the twin cities with I-30 completing the loop on the north. Interstate 369 shares the western portion of Loop 151. Interstate 49 is a newly constructed interstate corridor on the Arkansas side of the city which connects Texarkana to Shreveport, Louisiana.

== Notable people ==
- McTelvin Agim, NFL defensive end
- Joe Anderson, NFL wide receiver
- Miller Barber (1931–2013), former PGA Tour golfer
- Bonnie Baxter, artist
- Jesse Belvin, singer, pianist, and songwriter
- Footsie Blair (1900–1982), Major League Baseball second baseman for the Chicago Cubs
- J.B. Bobo, magician
- Ben M. Bogard, clergyman, founder of American Baptist Association in Texarkana in 1924
- Ray Bourbon (1902–1971), female impersonator
- Melvin Bunch, former MLB baseball player
- David Crowder, musician
- James C. Dodd, architect
- Robert Ealey, electric blues singer
- Jack Favor, rodeo performer
- Carl Finch, musician, founder of Brave Combo
- Corinne Griffith, silent-film actress
- Harmonica Slim, blues harmonicist, singer, and songwriter
- Rich Houston, former New York Giants NFL football player
- V. E. Howard, clergyman who founded the International Gospel Hour
- LaMichael James, football player for the San Francisco 49ers and Miami Dolphins
- Brandon Jones, NFL wide receiver
- Scott Joplin, ragtime music composer and pianist
- Jeff Keith, lead singer of rock band Tesla
- Jarrion Lawson, American sprinter and long jumper
- Joshua Logan, film and stage director, Tony Award and Pulitzer Prize winner
- Ryan Mallett, NFL quarterback for Baltimore Ravens
- Eddie Mathews, baseball player in Hall of Fame
- Will Middlebrooks, baseball player for the Milwaukee Brewers
- Craig Monroe, baseball player
- Mac Morgan, opera singer
- Ross Perot, businessman and politician
- Molly Quinn, actress
- John D. Raffaelli, American lobbyist
- James Theodore Richmond, writer, conservationist
- Joscelyn Roberson, USA artistic gymnast
- Bill Rogers, golfer
- Dame Marjorie Morris Scardino, Pulitzer Prize-winning publisher and CEO of Pearson PLC
- Michael Jarboe Sheehan, Roman Catholic Archbishop of Santa Fe
- Drew Stubbs, baseball player for the Cincinnati Reds and Colorado Rockies
- Marshall Terrill, author
- Aysel Teymurzadeh, singer, performer
- Michael Trimble, opera singer, voice teacher
- Nathan Vasher, football player
- Michael Wacha, baseball player for the San Diego Padres
- Frank D. White, governor of Arkansas from 1981 to 1983
- Otis Williams, musician, founding member of The Temptations

== Bibliography ==
- "Jail stormed; Negro Lynched". The Union Daily Times. Union, South Carolina. May 20, 1922. pp. 1–4. ISSN 2471-0563. OCLC 13088988.
- Price, D. J. (1896). The Texarkana Gateway to Texas and the Southwest. St. Louis, Missouri: Woodward & Tiernan Printing Company.
