= Wagner Creek =

Wagner Creek may refer to:

- Wagner Creek (Florida), a stream in Florida
- Wagner Creek (Bear Creek tributary), a stream in Oregon
- Wagner Creek (Texas), a stream in Texarkana, Texas
