= Swampoodle =

Swampoodle can refer to:

- Swampoodle, Baltimore, a long-forgotten name for a Czech-American enclave in East Baltimore.
- Swampoodle Connection, a proposed connection of the Chestnut Hill West Line (R8) with the Manayunk/Norristown Line in the Swampoodle neighborhood in Philadelphia.
- Swampoodle Grounds also known as Capitol Park (II), the former home of the Washington Nationals baseball team of the National League from 1886 to 1889 named after the Swampoodle neighborhood.
- Swampoodle (Philadelphia), a former Irish neighborhood and location of the Connie Mack Stadium, also known as Shibe Park. Former home of the Philadelphia Athletics and the Philadelphia Phillies.
- Swampoodle, Washington, D.C., an Irish neighborhood in Washington, D.C.
- Swampoodle Creek, a creek in Texarkana, Texas.
