= History of Irish Americans in Washington, D.C. =

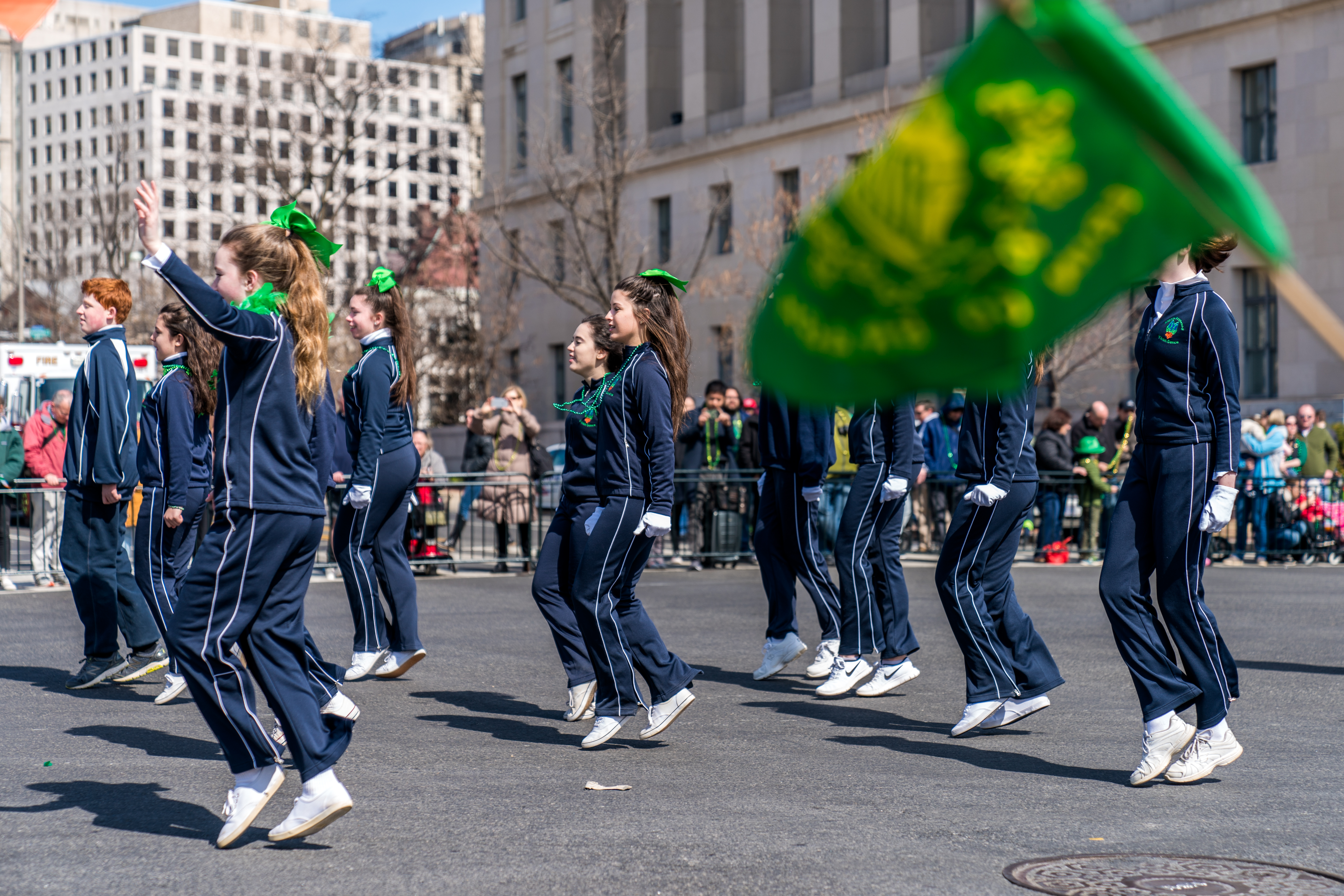
Maple School of Irish Dance at the 48th Annual St. Patrick’s Day Parade of Washington, DC (2018)

People of Irish descent form a distinct ethnic group in Washington, D.C., and have had a presence in the region since the pre-American Revolution period.

== History ==
=== 18th century ===
By the mid to late 1700s, there were a number of first- and second-generation Irish Americans living in Georgetown, as listed in the early parish registers of Holy Trinity Catholic Church. The earliest Irish immigrants in the region were shopkeepers, merchants, craftsmen, and general laborers.

During this period, the main working-class Irish neighborhood in Washington, D.C. was the waterfront area, below Bridge Street (today's M St.), which was considered to be Georgetown's poorer area at the time. Wealthier Irish American residents living north of the area became more accepted and assimilated into wider society in Georgetown, marrying into other middle class Catholic families of English and German descent.

In 1792, Irish American James Hoban was selected as the architect of the White House in Washington, D.C. Hoban was also one of the supervising architects of the U.S. Capitol, which had many Irish builders assisting in its completion. Hoban worked on other local public buildings and government projects in D.C., including roads and bridges.

==== The Corcoran Family ====
The Corcoran family was a prominent early Irish American family in Washington, D.C. The patriarch of the family, Thomas Corcoran, was born in Ireland, settled in Georgetown in 1788, and established a leather business. He was an early Irish American businessman and politician in the D.C. area, serving as mayor of the town of Georgetown, District of Columbia and a total of 22 terms on the Georgetown Common Council.

In 1836, Thomas' son, William Wilson Corcoran, opened a small brokerage house. In 1840, Corcoran and George Washington Riggs, the son of Elisha Riggs, formed "Corcoran & Riggs", which offered checking and depositing services. In 1844, the U.S. federal government allowed the firm to be the only federal depository in Washington.

=== 19th century ===
Washington, D.C.'s first major influx of Irish came in 1844 from rural areas, spurred by the Irish Famine. Some Irish laborers were recorded as builders of the Chesapeake and Ohio Canal from the mid 1820s to the 1850s and as workers in the port of Georgetown. Records indicate that some of the Irish builders of the C&O canal were indentured laborers.

The local Irish community was greatly impacted by a cholera epidemic in 1832 which swept through the construction camps of the C&O canal, killing many Irish workers.

The Swampoodle neighborhood became a refuge for Irish emigrants arriving during the famine. Irish construction workers were early builders in the industrializing of the area. Many Irish households in the area kept a variety of livestock in their alleys, a practice that was permitted through the early 20th century. The Swampoodle neighborhood gained a local reputation as a "shanty town" with prostitution, crime, gang activity, and public intoxication.

In 1859, a Roman Catholic church, St. Aloysius Church was constructed and dedicated in the area. The church largely catered to the Irish Catholic population in Swampoodle. Many Irish families in the neighborhood also sent their sons to school at Gonzaga College High School.

Another area largely inhabited by Irish Americans in the mid to late 1800s was the Foggy Bottom area, which was considered to have more affordable housing during the period.

=== 20th century ===
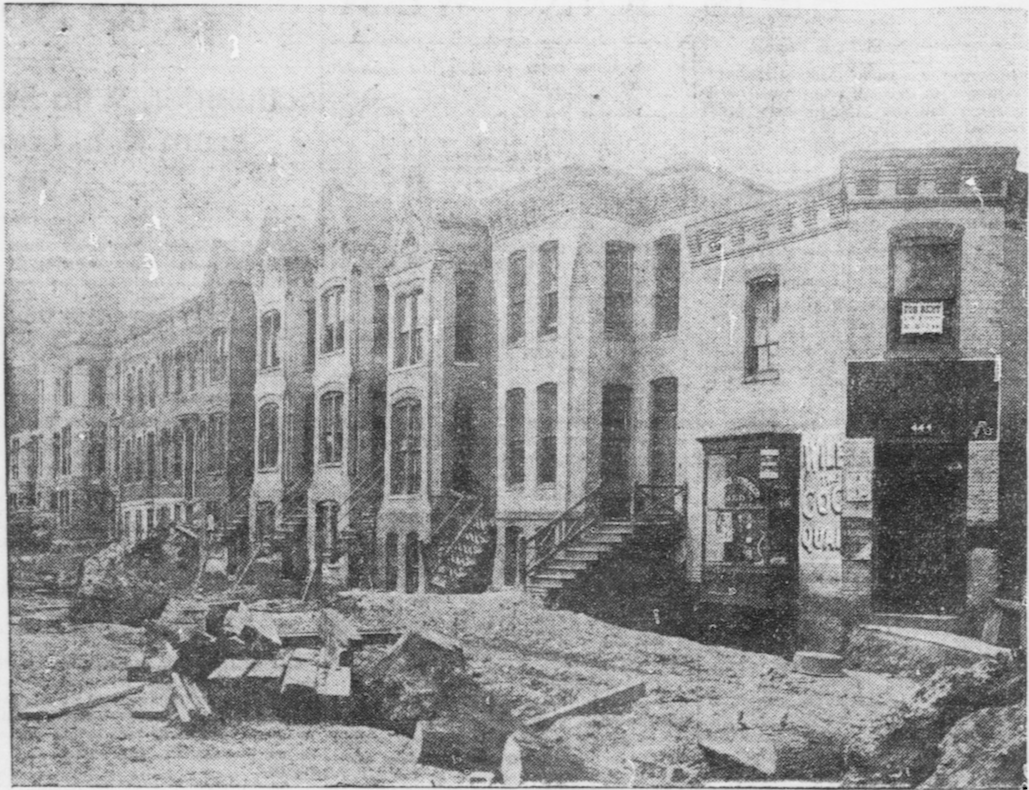
Row houses which were razed to make way for the Tiber Creek tunnel in 1904

In 1904, several row houses in the Swampoodle Irish neighborhood on 1st Street NE were demolished to make way for the Tiber Creek tunnel. In 1907, the construction of Washington Union Station had a significant impact on the Irish American community in Washington, D.C. and the 1,600 residents of the area, as it forced the demolition of over 10 blocks of the Swampoodle neighborhood and over 100 apartment buildings, row houses, and businesses owned by the Irish community.

In 1949, The Embassy of Ireland in Washington was opened at 2234 Massachusetts Avenue at Sheridan Circle. The embassy has hosted cultural events and provided resources and support to Irish Americans.

=== 21st century ===
As of the late 2000s, there has been an ongoing effort in the area to build "The Irish American Museum of Washington, D.C.," which currently hosts online exhibitions. The museum's objective is "to become a major cultural institution that will bring Irish-American history to life for visitors of all ages, from all ethnic, racial, and cultural backgrounds." The museum was proposed in 2008, but active fundraising was deferred due to the 2008 financial crisis, and in 2015 the Washington Post deemed the museum unlikely to ever open.

In 2010, the Irish Network of D.C. was established to create opportunities for Irish Americans in the D.C. area to connect with their heritage and take part in social and professional events.

== Culture ==
=== Arts and Entertainment ===
Saint Patrick's Day is widely celebrated in Washington, D.C. and the city has held an annual parade on the occasion since 1971. National ShamrockFest is a one-day music festival held in the city, reaching audiences of over 40,000 attendees in previous years. It has been billed as "America's Largest St. Paddy's Day Festival."

Founded in 2005, Solas Nua ("new light" in Irish) is a D.C.-based Irish arts organization that presents programming in areas including film, music, visual arts and literature. The organization works to promote Irish and Irish American artists.

In 2011, a play titled "Swampoodle" by Tom Swift, debuted with support from Solas Nua and the Ireland-based Performance Corporation to help combat stereotypes about Irish Americans and share the Irish history of Washington, D.C. The play consists of "colorful, disparate stories about life in the predominantly Irish neighborhood."

=== Parks ===
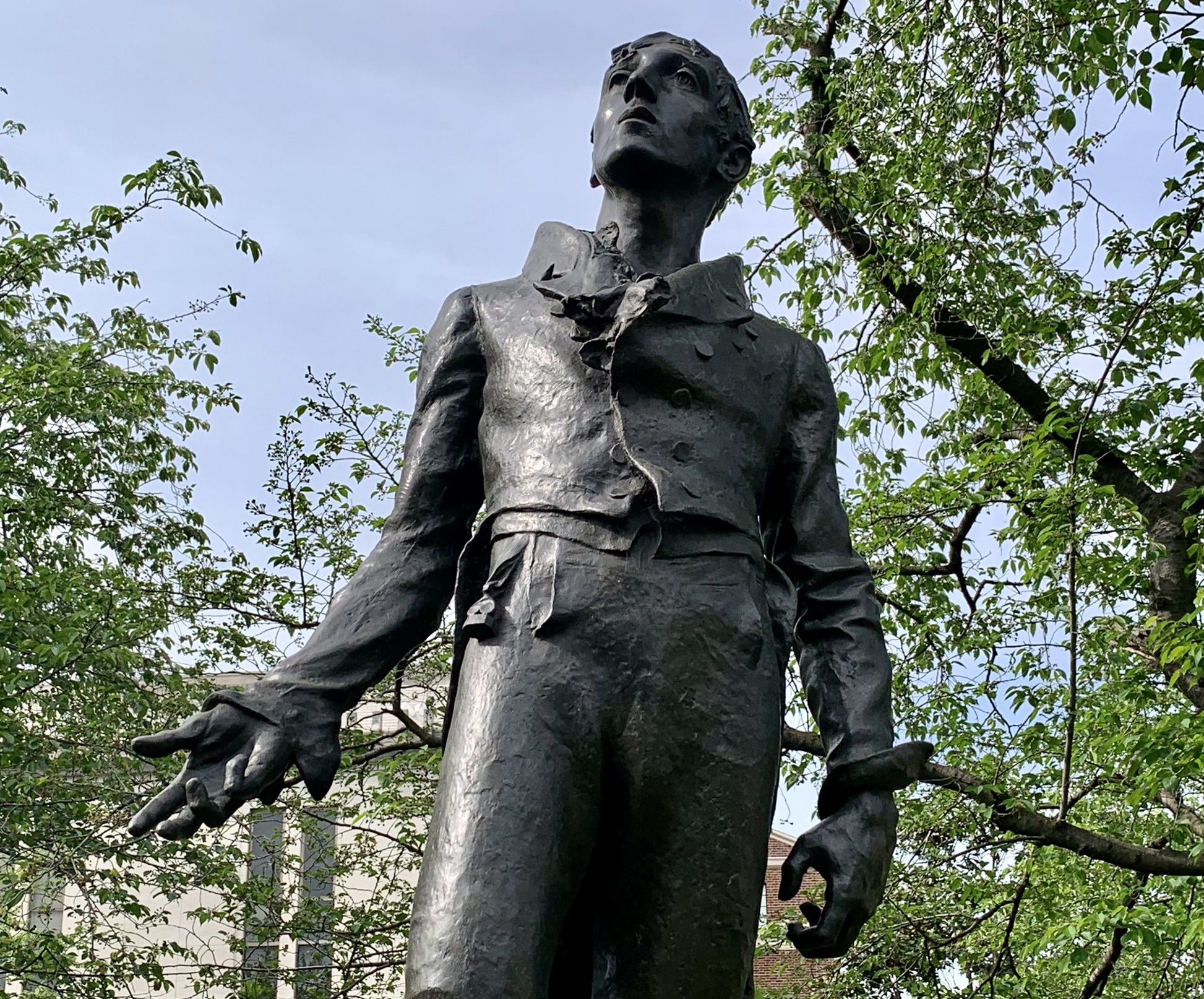
D.C.-area statue of Robert Emmet, Irish Republican

Robert Emmet Park is located on Embassy Row in D.C. In 1916, a bronze statue "Robert Emmet" was sculpted by Irish artist Jerome Connor in honor of Irish Republican Robert Emmet. The statue was a gift to the Smithsonian Institution on loan to the National Park Service.

In 1924, a sculpture, "Nuns of the Battlefield," was erected in D.C. by Connor as a tribute to the more than 600 nuns who nursed soldiers of both armies during the American Civil War. Connor was chosen to design the monument since he focused on Irish Catholic themes, being one himself.

A public park at the intersection of 3rd Street NE and L Street NE, a block from the border of the old neighborhood, was named "Swampoodle Park" in 2018 in honor of the historic Irish neighborhood. The park officially opened November 17, 2018.

=== Cuisine ===
Irish cuisine has long been a staple of D.C.'s bar and restaurant scene. D.C. has several Irish pubs and restaurants serving traditional Irish fare and drinks throughout the area. The Dubliner restaurant (opened 1974) is D.C.'s longest continuously opened/operated Irish pub in the area. Many of the pubs and restaurants host special events and celebrations during Saint Patrick's Day celebrations in Washington, D.C.

=== Sports ===
The Washington, D.C. Gaels GAA is an amateur sports club that promotes Irish sports in the city.

Founded in 1980, the Washington Irish Rugby Football Club is a Mid-Atlantic Conference (MAC) rugby union team based in the city. The Washington Irish currently field two competitive men's club rugby sides, one in Division I and one in Division III. The Washington Irish compete within the Capital Geographic Union of USA Rugby.

== Demographics ==
As of 2020, Irish Americans represent 7.05% (49,498 people) of the total population of Washington, D.C.

== See also ==
- Irish Americans
- Demographics of Washington, D.C.
- Irish Americans in the American Civil War
