= Robert Emmet (disambiguation) =

Robert Emmet (1778–1803) was an Irish nationalist.

Robert Emmet may also refer to:

- Robert Temple Emmet (1854–1936), U.S. Army officer and Medal of Honor recipient
- Robert Emmet (Connor), a 1916 statue of the Irish nationalist by Jerome Connor
