= Swampoodle, Philadelphia =

Swampoodle
- Neighborhood of Philadelphia
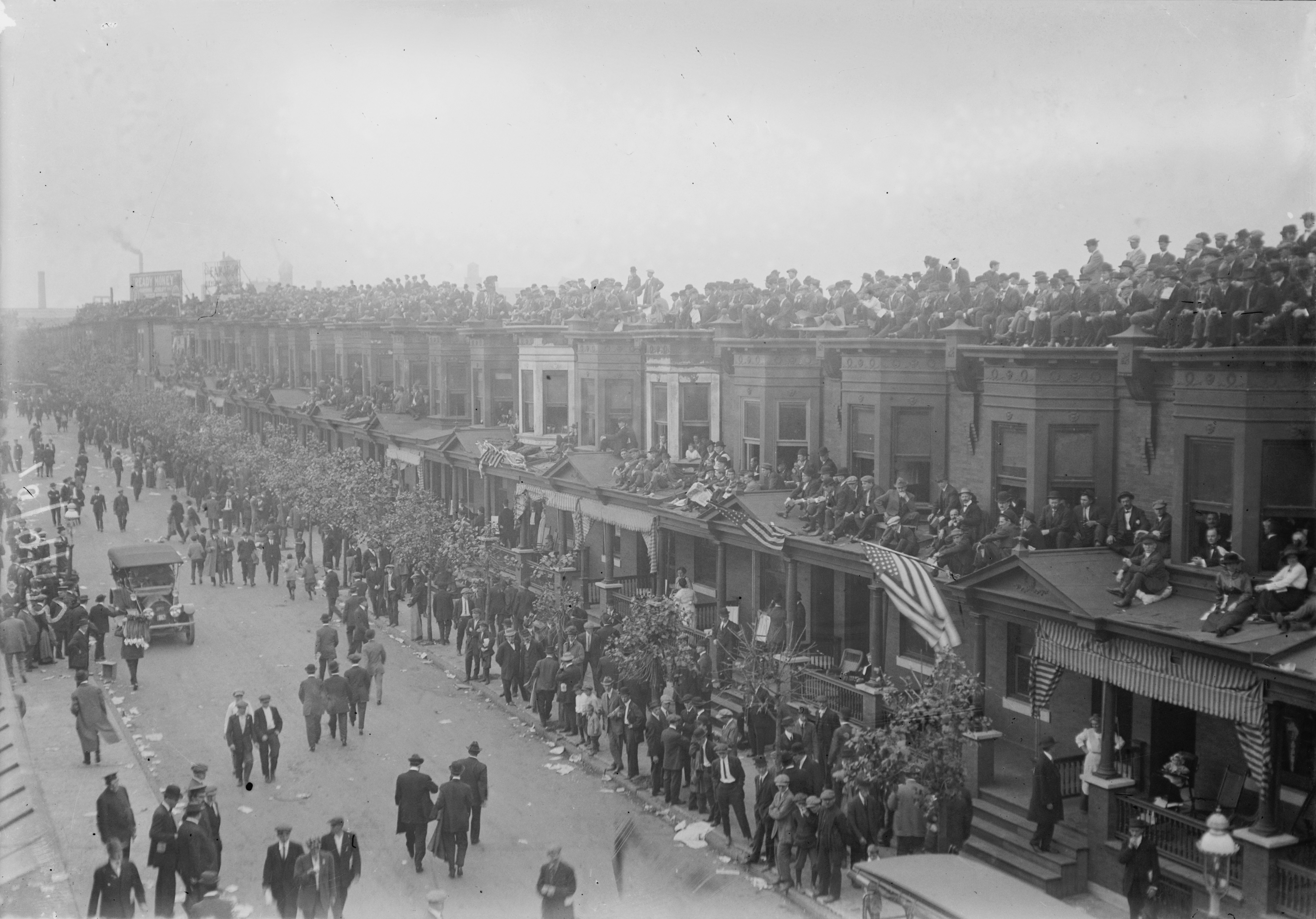
- Rooftop bleachers overlooking Shibe Park (Connie Mack) Stadium in Philadelphia's Swampoodle Neighborhood, circa 1913.

- Location within Philadelphia
- Country: United States
- State: Pennsylvania
- County: Philadelphia
- City: Philadelphia
- Area codes: 215, 267 and 445

Swampoodle is an older neighborhood in North Philadelphia, Pennsylvania, United States. Swampoodle was defined as the vicinity of the junction of three railroad lines near Lehigh Avenue and 22nd Streets.

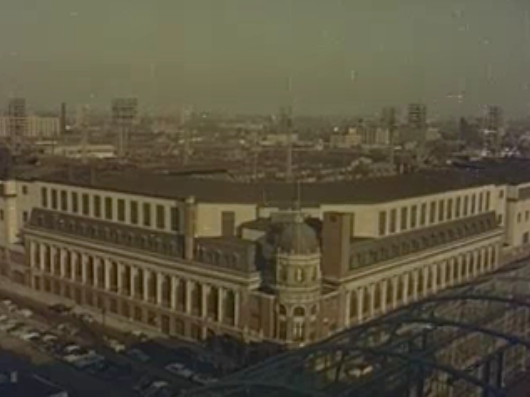
Shibe Park in Philadelphia's Swampoodle Neighborhood, now a part of Allegheny West, circa 1955.

The neighborhood was the home of Connie Mack Stadium, long known as Shibe Park. The stadium was located at 21st Street and Lehigh Avenue. Connie Mack Stadium was once the home of the Philadelphia Athletics of the American League (AL) and the Philadelphia Phillies of the National League. Owners of homes bordering the stadium would make money parking cars or renting porch and roof space. Formerly an Irish neighborhood, as of 2012 it had been absorbed into Allegheny West, a poor African-American enclave that had suffered post-industrial decline and disinvestment.

There are several accounts of how the neighborhood came to be named Swampoodle. One source says that the name refers to the swampiness and frequent formation of puddles near 22nd Street and Lehigh Avenue. The term is also slang for low-lying land and may have been used because Cohocksink Creek ran through the area. Others have countered that the area is actually elevated.

== Location ==
Finkel defines Swampoodle as "Junction of three railroad lines, vic. [vicinity] Lehigh Avenue and 22nd Streets." He gives "(before 1926)" as the time period during which the name is attested in the sources that he and his contributors consulted. The Philadelphia Information Locator Service list, augmented from the Finkel 1995 list, repeats the same definition. However, the junction of three railroads to which they refer would apparently be the junction at North Philadelphia station, which clearly has been well east of 22nd Street since the 1890s or earlier.

== Proposed SEPTA Swampoodle Connection ==
SEPTA's proposed Swampoodle Connection was named for the old neighborhood as recently as the 1980s.
