= Days Creek (Arkansas) =

Creek in western Arkansas

Location
- Country: United States

Physical characteristics
- Source
  - location: Texarkana, Arkansas; Texarkana, Texas
  - coordinates: 33°24′45″N 94°02′56″W
- Mouth
  - location: Sulphur River in Miller County, Arkansas
  - coordinates: 33°14′06″N 93°58′02″W

Days Creek is a creek in the Texarkana metropolitan area. The creek forms in southern Texarkana, Texas when the Nix Creek and Swampoodle Creek meet, before flowing south where Wagner Creek meets the creek near the Arkansas border. The creek then passes into Arkansas flowing east where it meets Sulphur River south-west of Fouke.
