= Swampoodle (Washington, D.C.) =

Coordinates: 38°54′0.7″N 77°0′29.5″W

- Neighborhood of Washington, D.C.
- Map of Washington, D.C. with Swampoodle highlighted in red
- Country: United States
- District: Washington, D.C.
- Ward: Ward 6
- Postal code: ZIP Code

Swampoodle was a neighborhood in Washington, D.C. on the border of Northwest and Northeast in the late 19th and early 20th centuries. This neighborhood is no longer known as Swampoodle and has been replaced in large part by NoMa.

== Geography ==
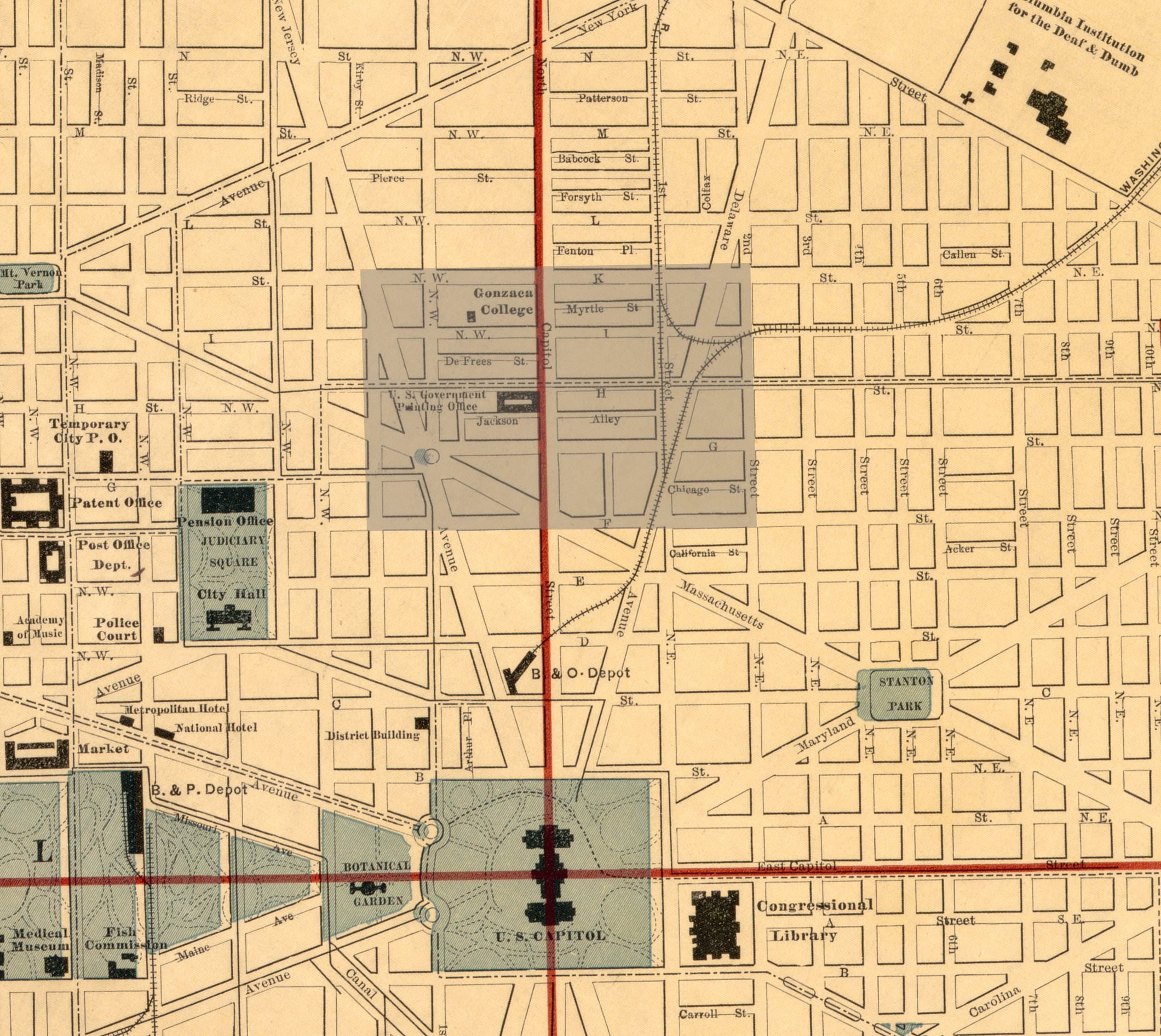
Map of Swampoodle in Washington, D.C. in 1893

A geographic approximation can only be evaluated as it was never clearly defined. Originally, the northeastern part of Washington, D.C. above Judiciary Square was known as "English Hill" from E Street NE/NW on the South and 4th Street NW on the west all the way to Boundary Road. It was a rural area with almost no buildings and gravel sidewalks. This original settlement contracted to the area bordered by 4th Street NW, 1st NW, E Street NE/NW, H Street NE/NW. "Swampoodle" was the name of a smaller settlement along H Street between North Capitol Street and 1st NE but extended to take a big part of "English Hill".

Later on, its borders contracted to K Street NE to the North, G Street NE to the South, 2nd Street NW to the West, and 2nd Street NE to the East. Through the center of it ran the principal branch of Tiber Creek running between North Capitol Street and 1st Street NE.

The name "Swampoodle" is believed to come from a newspaper reporter covering the ground-breaking of the Roman Catholic St. Aloysius Church in 1857, who referred to the land at the site at the intersection of North Capitol and I Street as containing numerous swamps and puddles that often occurred when Tiber Creek overflowed its banks.

== History ==
Sanborn Fire Insurance Map # 12 in 1888, showing the notorious Jackson Alley next to the Government Printing Office Building (square 624).

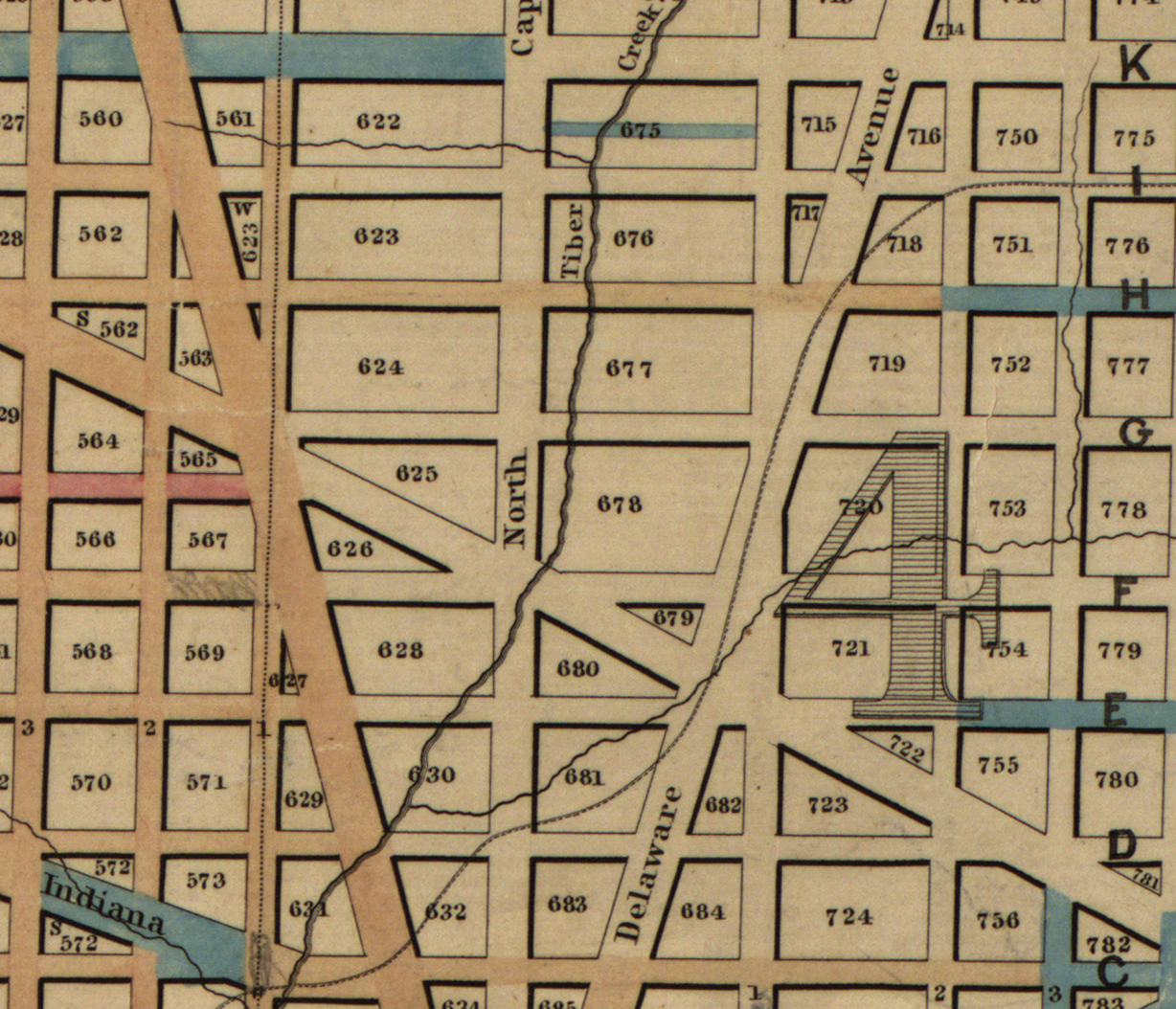
Detail showing the paved areas in Swampoodle around Tiber Creek, c. 1873.

Swampoodle developed during the second half of the 19th century, providing a place of refuge for emigrants following the Great Famine of Ireland that devastated Ireland between 1845 and 1849.

The area east of North Capitol Street remained undeveloped until the 1870s. The development of west of North Capitol started developing in the 1850s with two major construction projects. In 1856, the first Government Printing Office building was built on the southeastern corner of Square 624 and the following year, H Street was grated and graveled between New Jersey Avenue and North Capitol.

In 1859, St. Aloysius Catholic Church is built at 19 I Street NE on square 622. It catered to the Roman Catholic Irish population of Swampoodle. Gonzaga College High School moved to the same square in 1871.

By the early 20th century, most of the Irish American population had left the neighborhood. They were replaced by Greek and Italian immigrants and some African-Americans.

The neighborhood gained a reputation for being a lawless shantytown, where crime, prostitution, drunkenness were rife during and after the Civil War. At the core of the district was Jackson Alley located next to the Government Printing Office Building, between G and H Streets and crossing North Capitol Street. It was a considered a virtual no-go area for the police and new recruits were often sent there for their training. The problem was more with the younger generation than the older folks. Gangs of young men known as "poodles" were the main cause of concern. But it was also a place to find work for its inhabitants. For a very long time, Jackson Alley was inhabited by "tinkers" or "tinners" because they were tinworkers.

The area was known for overcrowding and outbreaks of malaria, typhoid, and dysentery. But Swampoodle was a thriving community, whose Irish construction workers helped build Washington, D.C. As Swampoodle was then on the edge of the city, many of the residents kept goats and cows, sometimes in livestock pens among the alleys dividing their modest houses. Until the 1880s, the north side of K Street was not built and the only things there were swamps, pastures, and the railway track. This almost rural lifestyle continued until about 1907, when Washington Union Station was built.

In the 1870s, Tiber Creek was channeled underground along North Capitol Street. From Florida Ave to M Street, the sewer was 20 feet in diameter and grew to 30 feet for the section below M Street. Due to the elevation of the ground level, many found themselves with one level under the level of the street.

=== Swampoodle Grounds ===
Swampoodle Grounds, a stadium with a capacity of approximately 6,000, was the home of the Washington Statesmen baseball team from 1886 to 1889. It was located on a block bounded by North Capitol Street NE and tracks (west); F Street NE (south); Delaware Avenue NE (east); and G Street NE (north). The McDowell and Sons plant, seen in the background of the ballpark photo behind right field, was listed in city directories as the corner of Massachusetts Avenue and North Capitol Street.

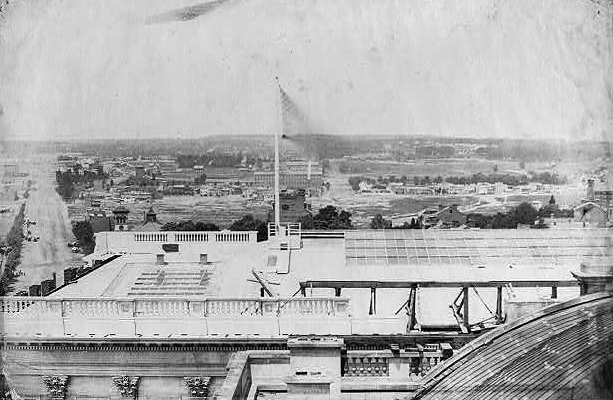
View north from United States Capitol taken on June 27, 1861 showing Swampoodle

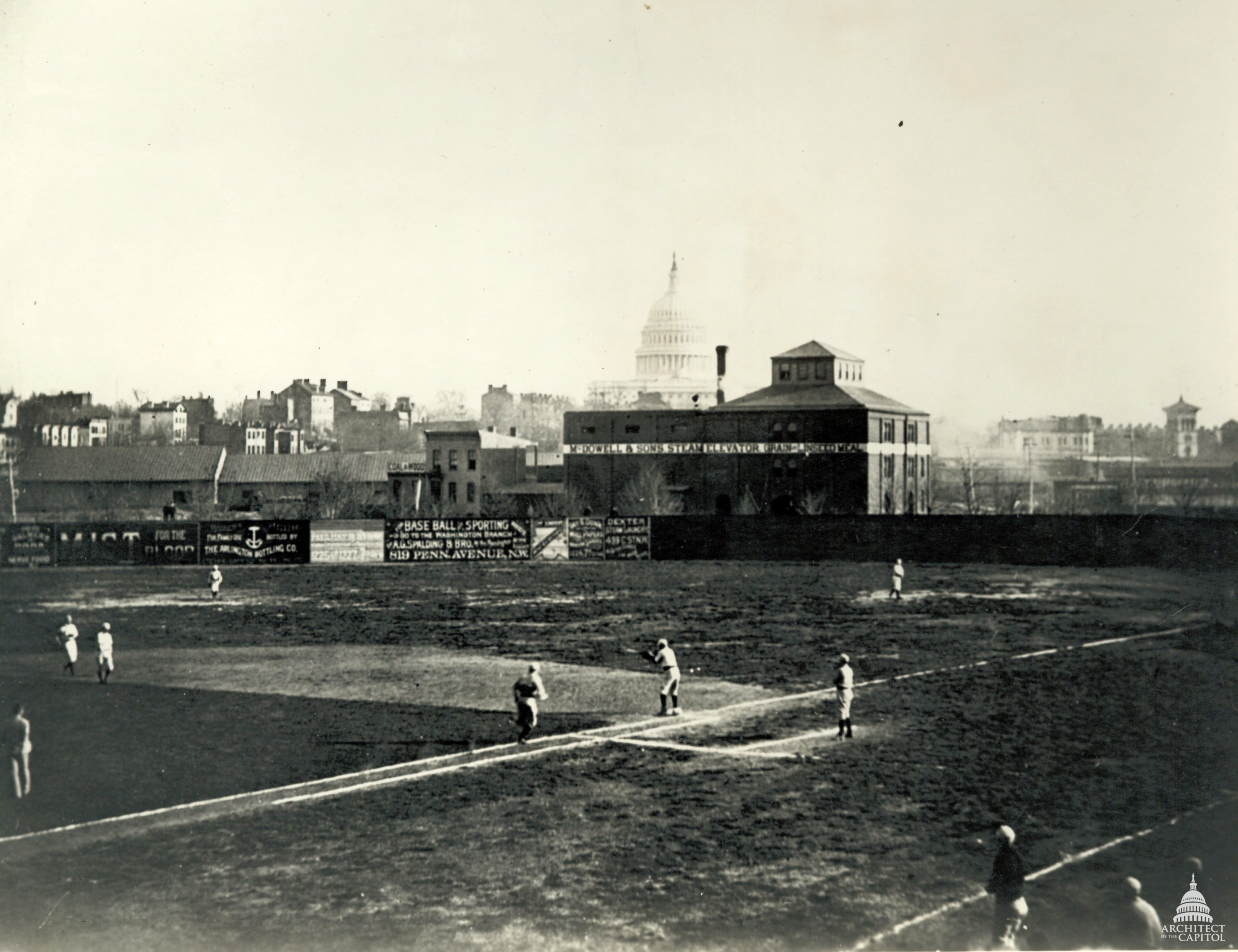
Swampoodle Grounds with the Washington Statesmen baseball team, c. 1886-1889

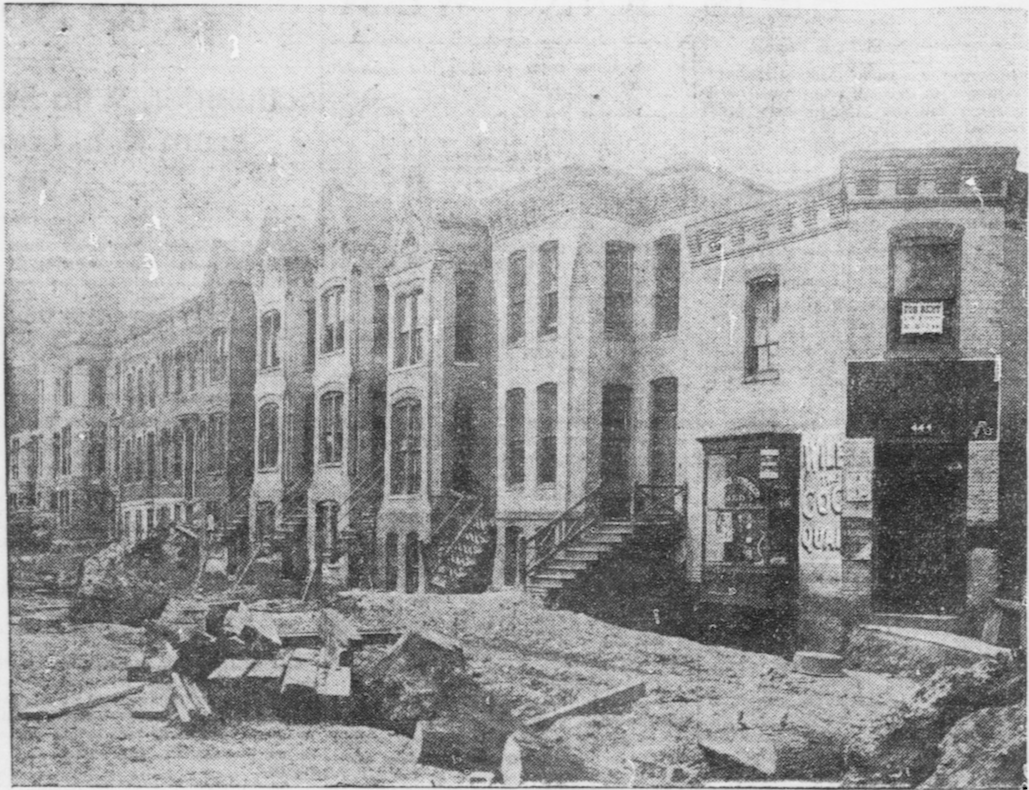
Houses on 1st Street NE which were razed to make way for the Tiber Creek tunnel in 1904

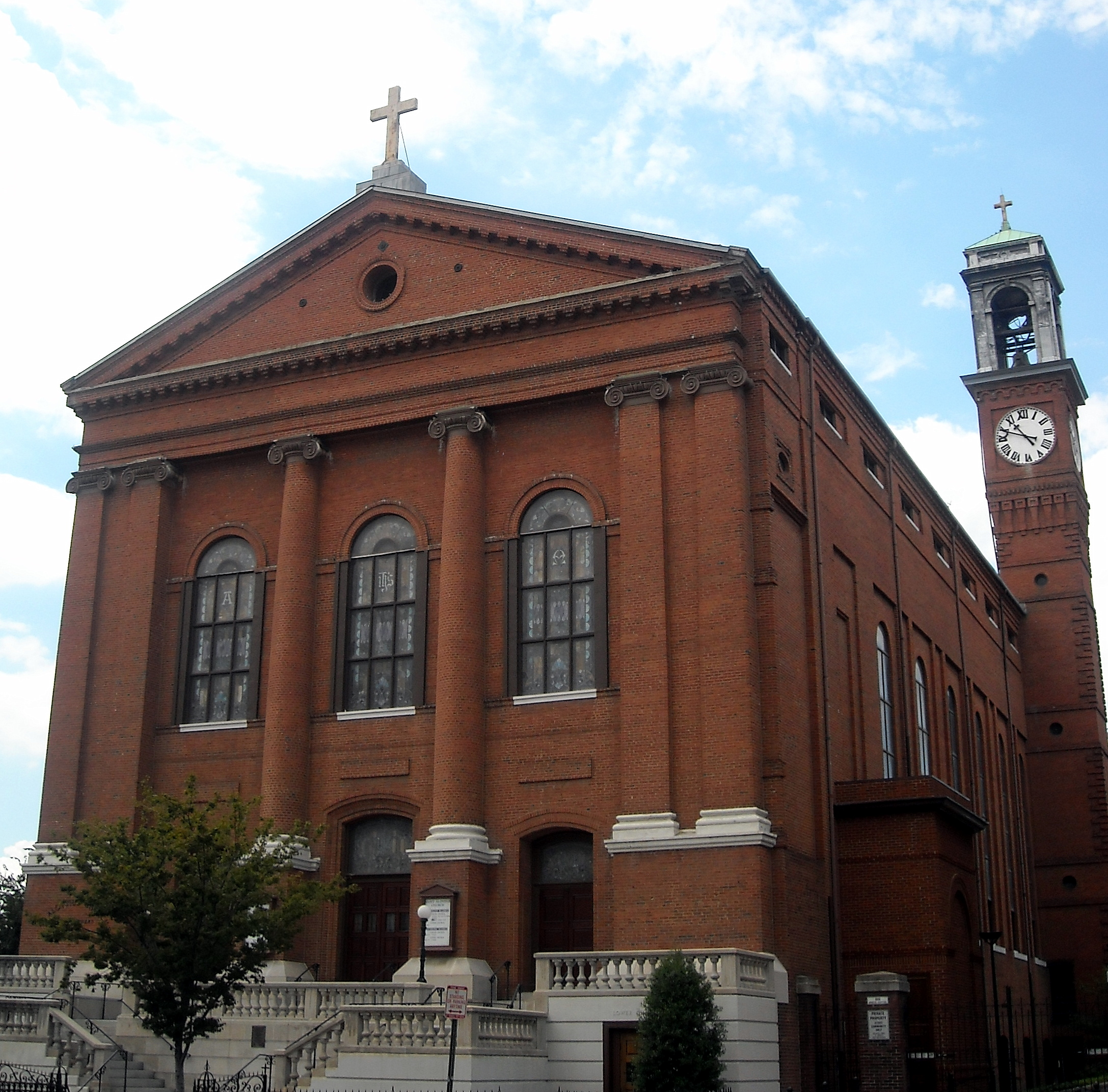
St. Aloysius Church today

== The end of Swampoodle ==
Map showing the impact of the railway tracks

Map showing the impact of Washington Union Station

The demise of Swampoodle as a community and neighborhood began with the construction of Union Station in 1907. The plan involved the demolition of over 10 blocks of residential houses in the core of Swampoodle. Over 100 houses were demolished to make way for the massive station and the rail yard. Squares 714 through 720 were razed. As part of the plan, the remainder of Tiber Creek was covered up in a tunnel and the low-lying land in the area was filed in. The section of Delaware Avenue between Florida Avenue (Previously known as Boundary Road) and Massachusetts Avenue was buried under the railway tracks with the exception of a small section between L Street and M Street NE.

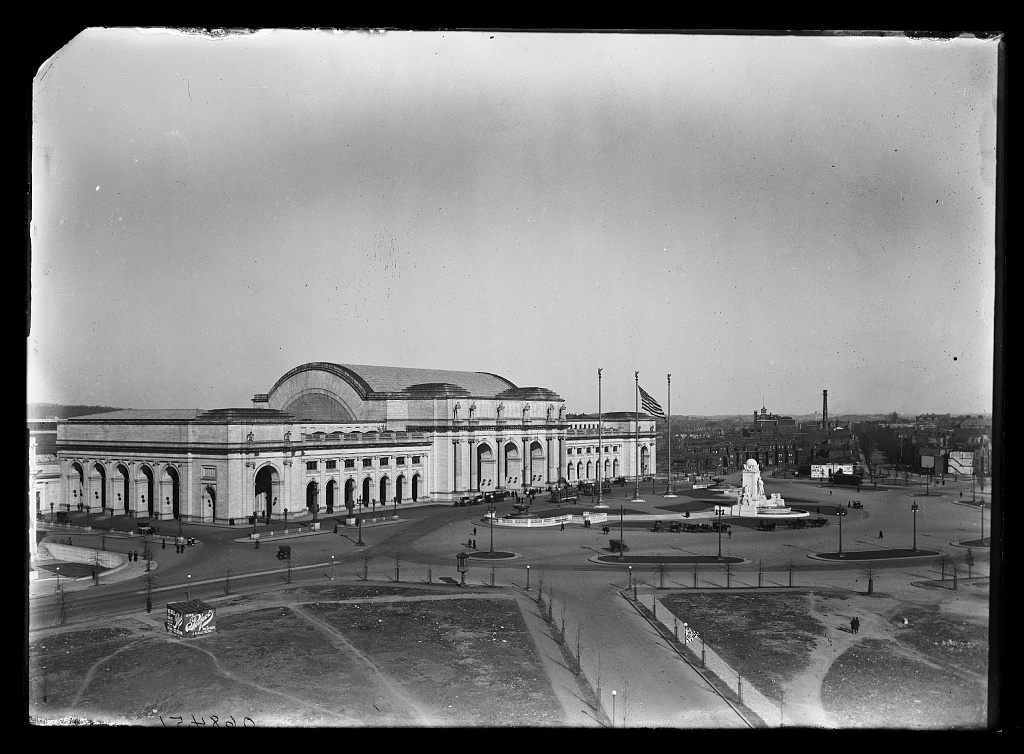
Washington Union Station, c. 1910

Washington Union Station, c. 1920

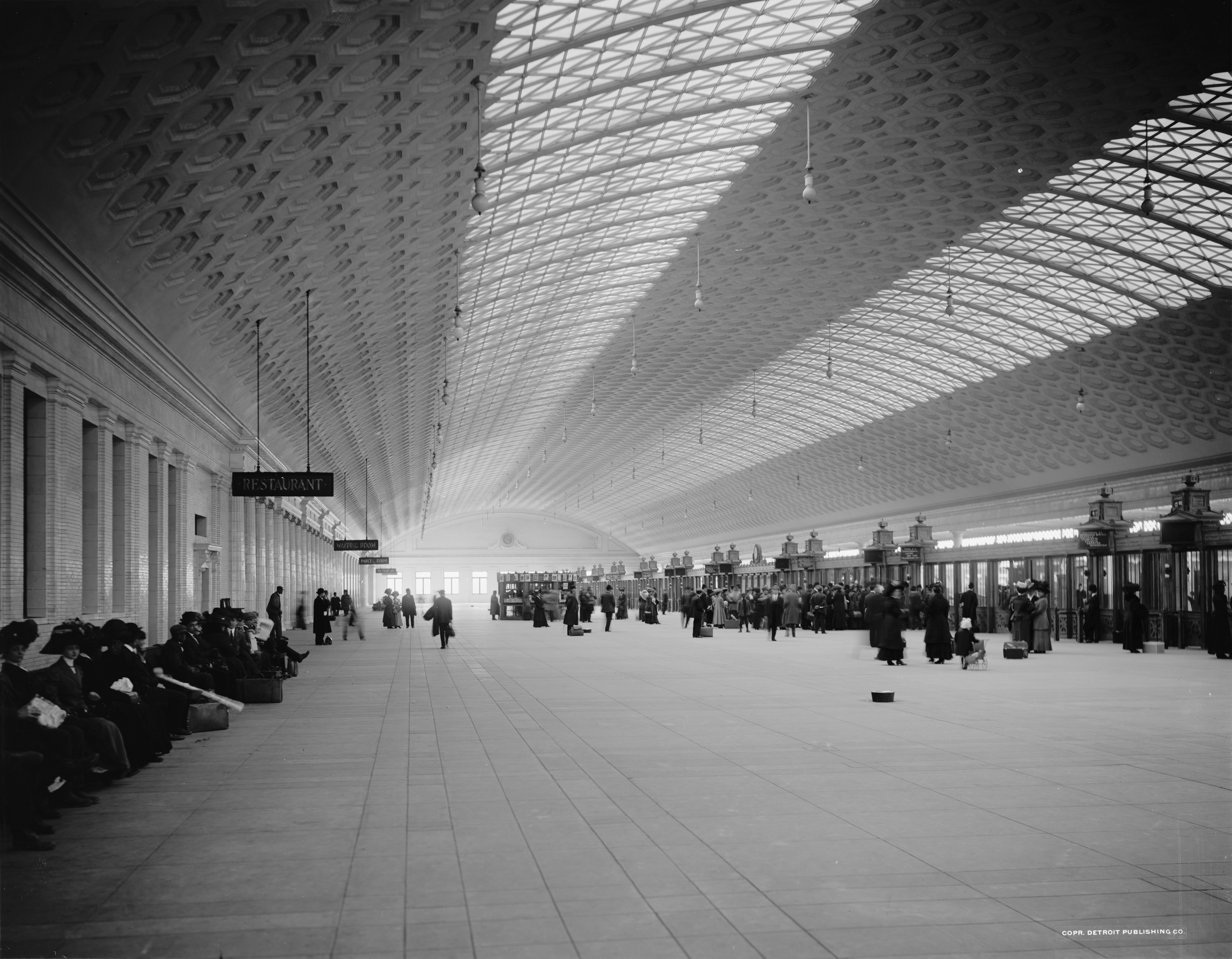
The train concourse at Washington Union Station, c. 1920

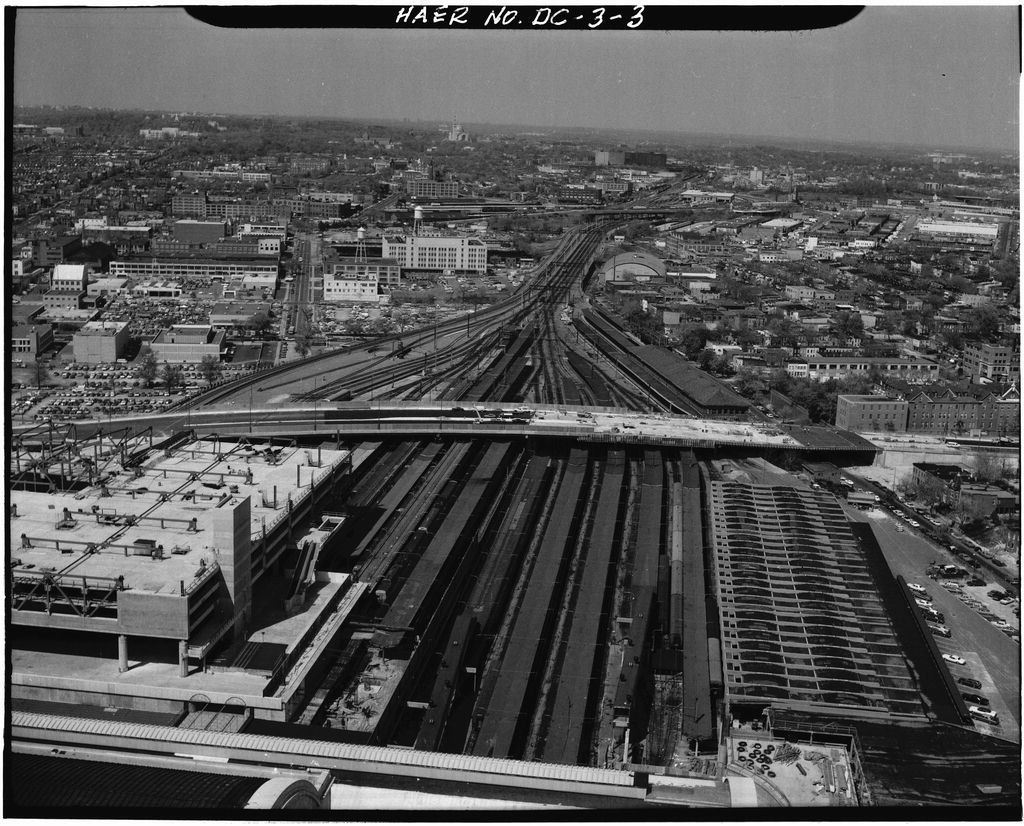
Tracks and platforms at Washington Union Station

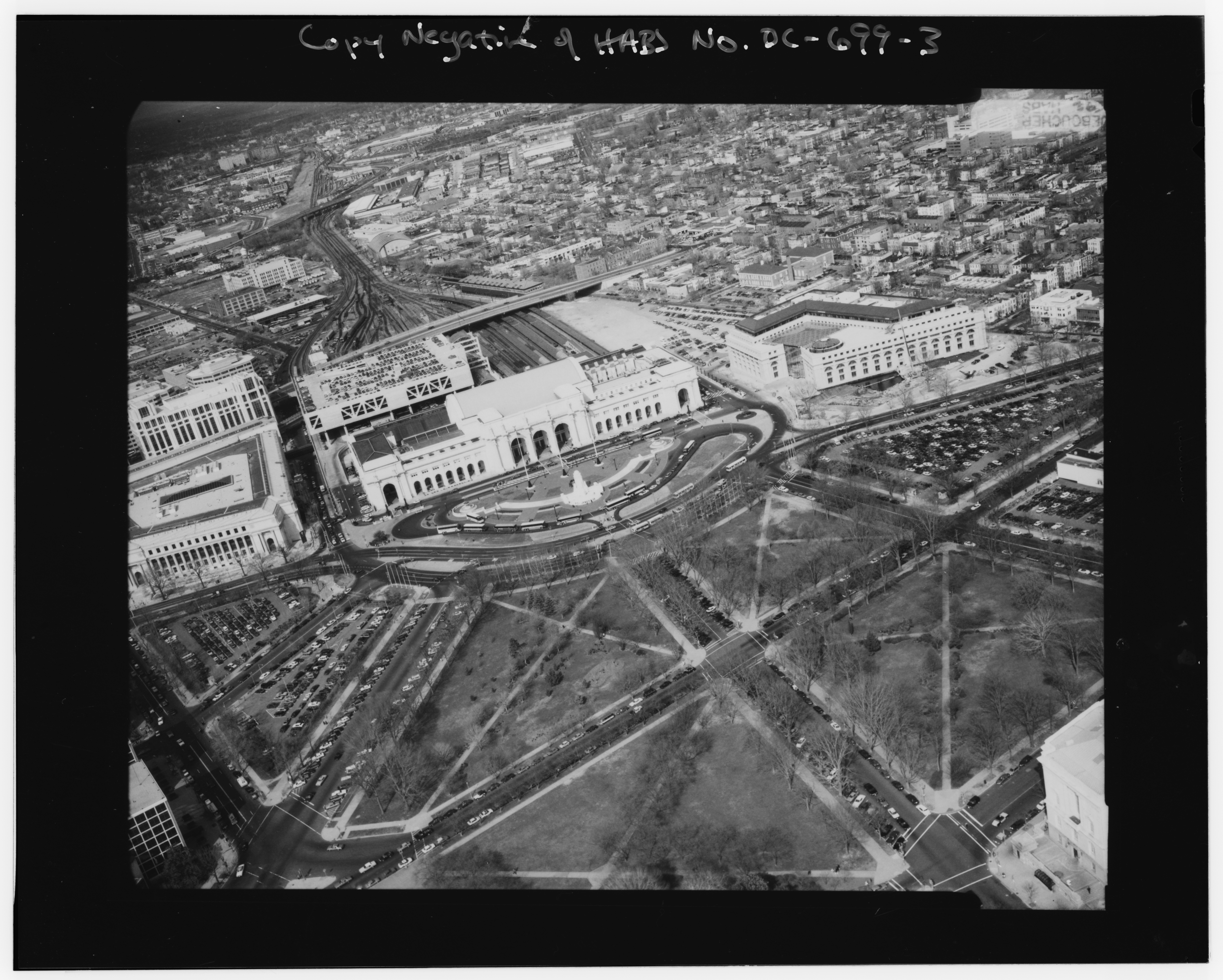
Aerial view northeast of Washington Union Station, where Swampoodle stood

This major project physically divided the neighborhood and led to many of the 1,600 former residents moving to other parts of the city. Rezoning led to increased heavy industry in the area, making it unattractive for residential use.

The identity of Swampoodle died away and by the post-World War II period, even the name Swampoodle was largely forgotten.

== Present ==
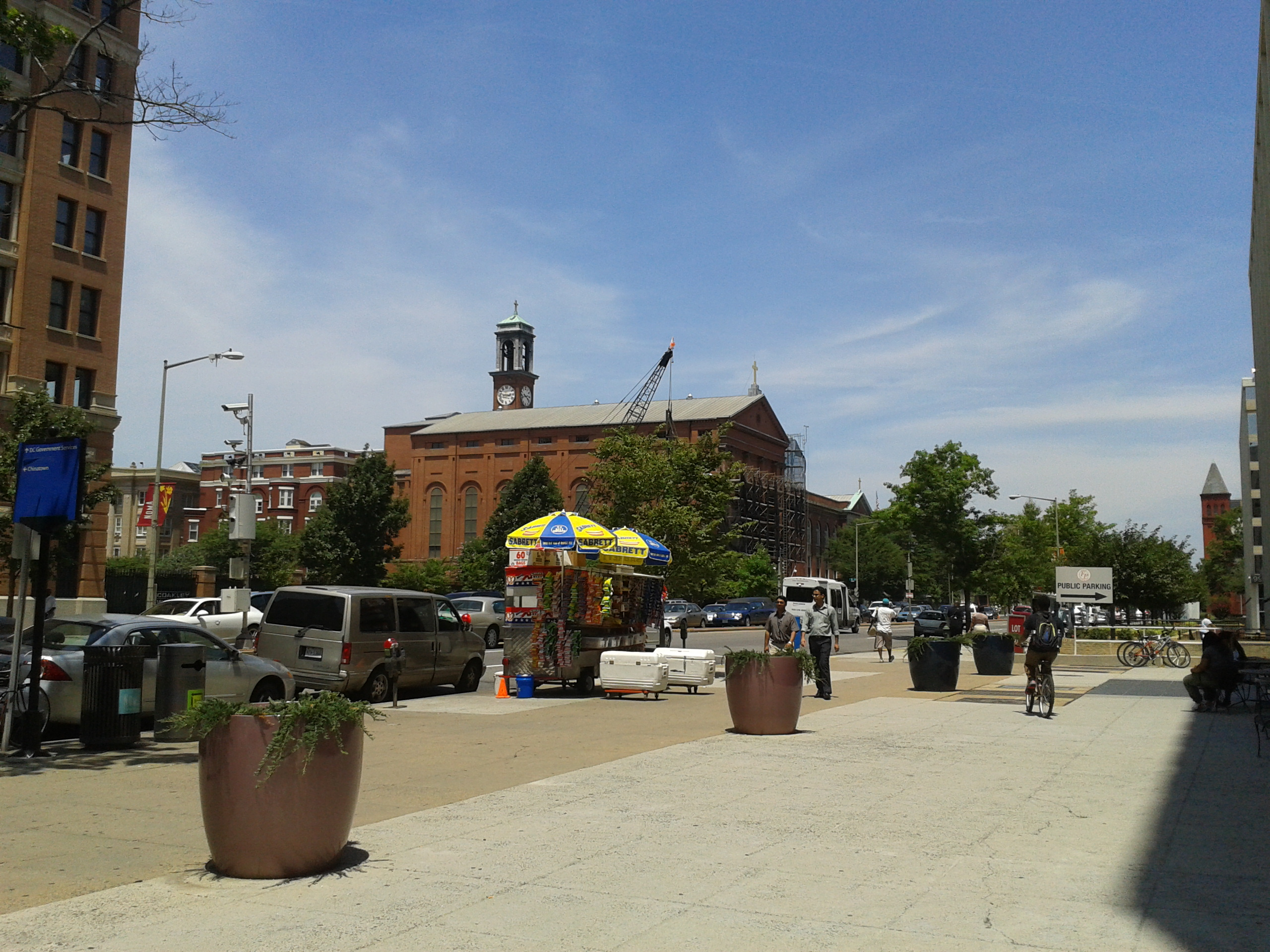
North Capitol Street in 2014 with St. Aloysius Church and Gonzaga College High School visible, and Washington Union Station several blocks in the opposite direction.

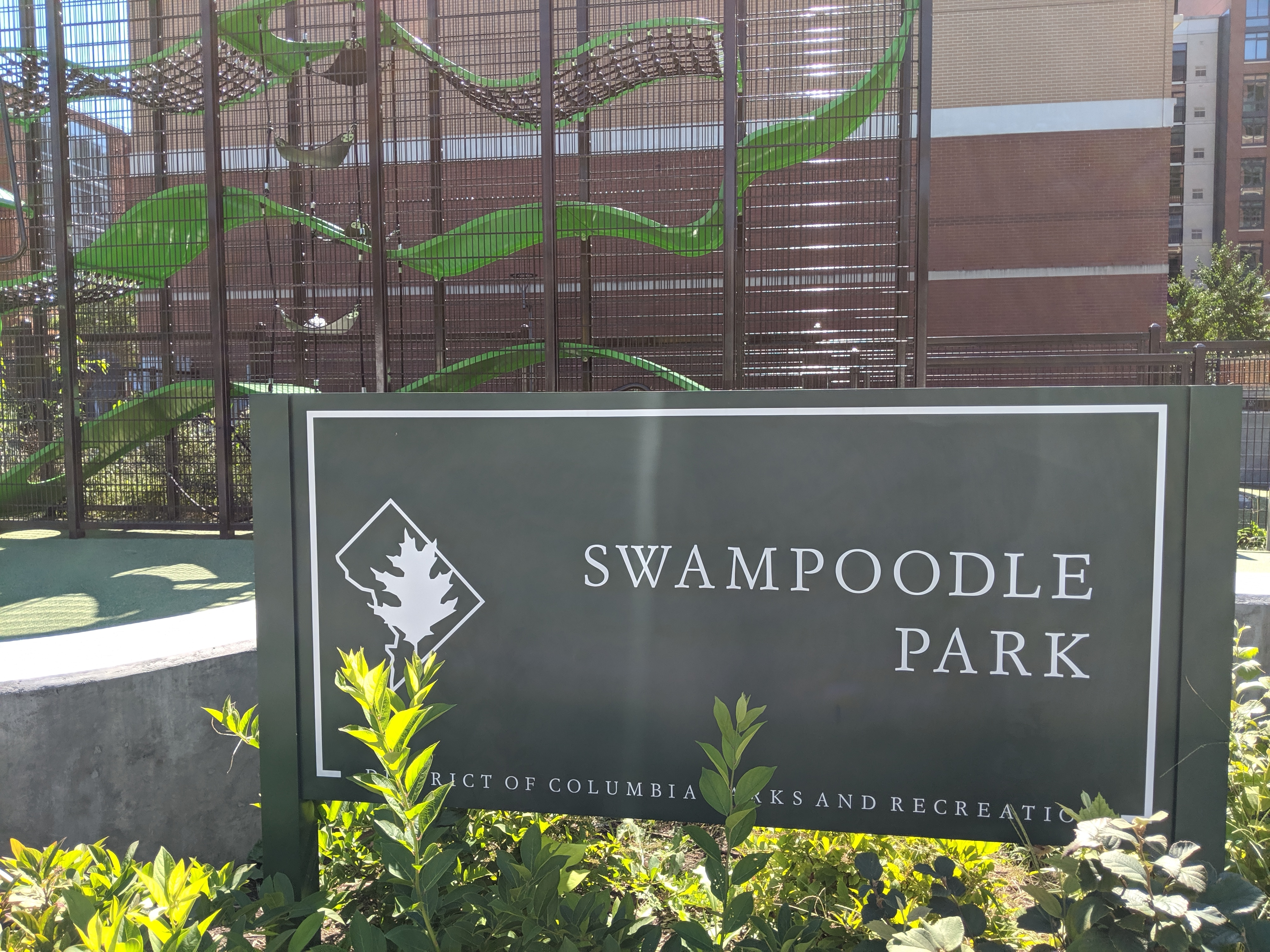
Swampoodle Park sign.

Today, the area is occupied primarily by office complexes, rail yards serving Union Station, the Government Publishing Office and Gonzaga College High School, a legacy of its original settlers. It is surrounded by some of the original dwellings, particularly in the Near Northeast section to the east of Delaware Avenue. Jackson Alley is no longer known as such. On the west side of North Capitol Street, it is under the Government Printing Office Building. On the east side of North Capitol, it is now known as G Place NE.

The neighborhood got some press after a play about it, Swampoodle by Tom Swift, debuted in 2011. It was produced by Solas Nua with support from the Ireland-based Performance Corporation to help combat stereotypes about the Irish. It consists of colorful, disparate stories about life in the predominantly Irish neighborhood.

Since 2007, the neighborhood has been included in the rebranded "NoMa" which stands for "North of Massachusetts Avenue." It is served by the NoMa – Gallaudet University Metro station and Union Station.

The Capitol Hill Restoration Society (CHRS) has begun walking tours of four square blocks of the neighborhood that remains today between F and H Streets NE and 2nd and 4th Streets NE. CHRS is proposing to expand the Capitol Hill Historic District to include these blocks as part of their Beyond the Boundaries initiative.

=== Swampoodle Park ===
The name "Swampoodle" has lost its negative connotation in the local community. As a result, a park at the intersection of 3rd Street NE and L Street NE, a block from the border of the old neighborhood, was named Swampoodle Park in 2018 in honor of the historic neighborhood. The announcement was made on December 13, 2017 after an online survey was conducted asking the community to vote for one of three possible names, the other two options being Old City Corner and 3rd and L Park. A bill codifying the name was introduced on April 9, 2018, and sponsored by Council Member Charles Allen (D) and Chairman Phil Mendelson (D). Resolution R22-0478 effective from April 10, 2018 passed on April 20, 2018 by 12 votes. Council Member Elissa Silverman (I) did not vote.

The park officially opened November 17, 2018.

== References to Swampoodle ==
In an article published in the Washington Herald on April 13, 1919, Capt. J. Walter Mitchell talks about the 1860s and 1870s Humphrey and Juenemann's Pleasure Garden (also known as Mount Vernon Lager Beer Brewery and Pleasure Garden). It was a gathering place on Capitol Hill between 4th, 5th, E and F Street NE where various events took place including picnics with dances which could lead to both fights and frolics. These picnics were apparently known as Swampoodle Walks probably due to the rough nature of the events and the fights.

== See also ==
- History of Irish Americans in Washington, D.C.
- NoMa
- Washington Brewery Company on Capitol Hill
- Swampoodle (disambiguation)
