= Spring Garden (Miami) =

- Neighborhood of Miami
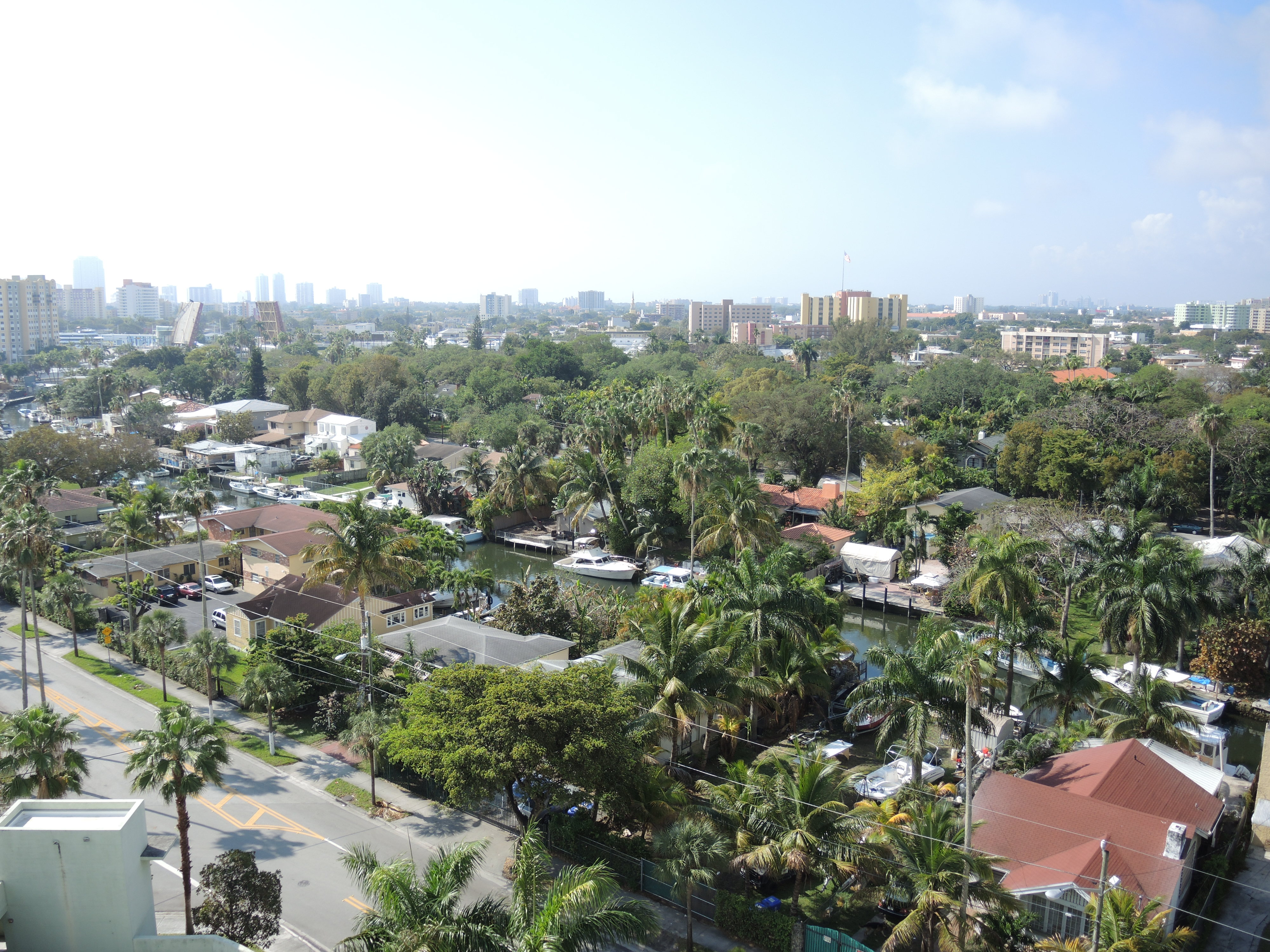
- Southeastward view of Spring Garden toward the Miami River

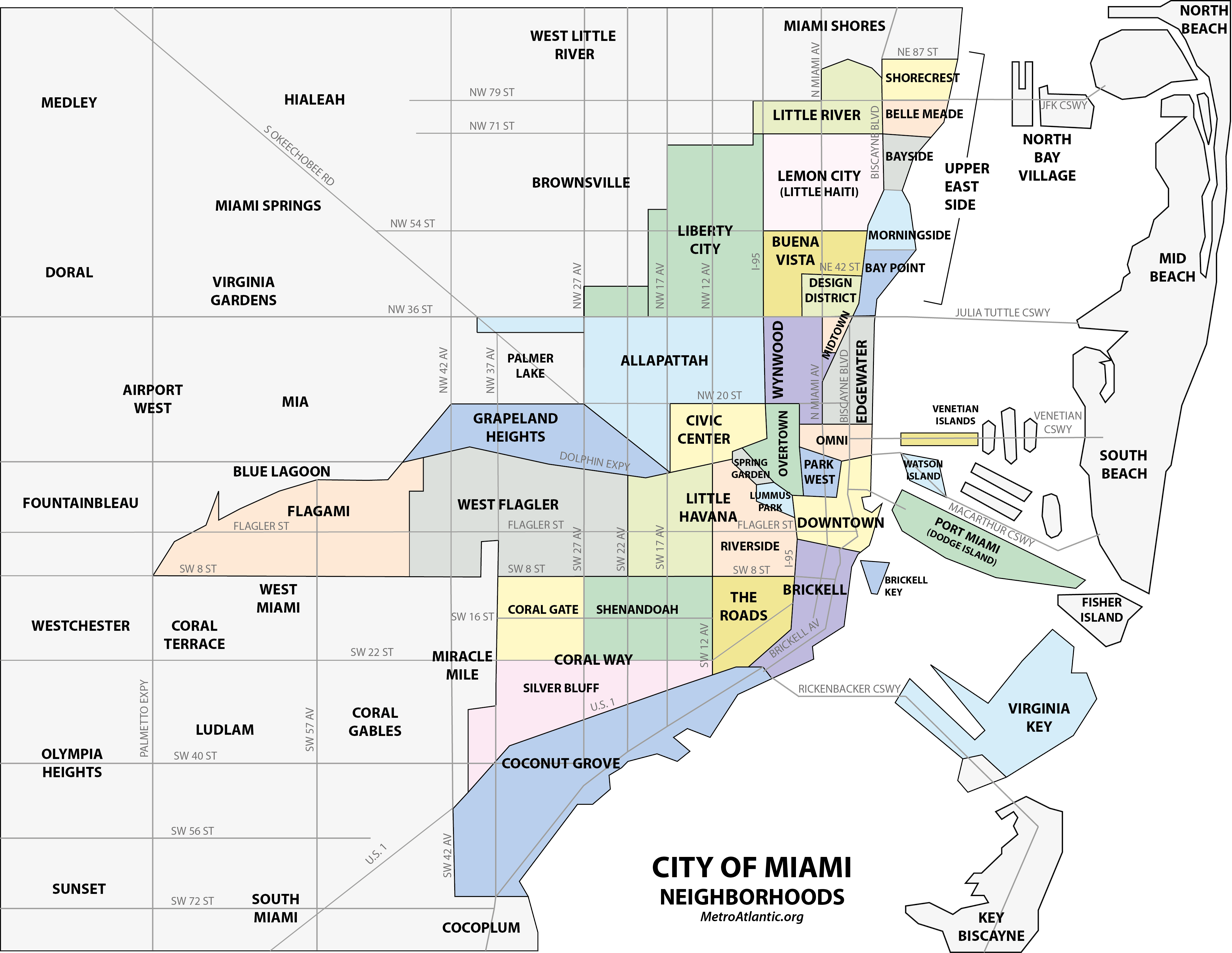
- Spring Garden neighborhood within Miami city proper
- Coordinates: 25.779405°N 80.207856°W
- Country: United States
- State: Florida
- County: Miami-Dade County
- City: Miami
- Settled: 1840s
- Incorporated into the City of Miami: 1896

Government
  - City of Miami Commissioner: Michelle Spence-Jones
  - Miami-Dade Commissioner: Eileen Higgins
  - House of Representatives: Cynthia A. Stafford (D)
  - State Senate: Miguel Diaz de la Portilla (R)
  - U.S. House: Frederica Wilson (D)

Area
  - Total: 0.148 sq mi (0.38 km^{2})
- Elevation: 7 ft (2.1 m)

Population (2010)
  - Total: 757
- Time zone: UTC-05 (EST)
  - Summer (DST): UTC-04
- ZIP Code: 33136
- Area codes: 305, 786

Spring Garden is a neighborhood of Miami, Florida, United States. The section of the city is one of the oldest purpose-built single-family residential neighborhoods in Miami and in the Greater Miami area. It is bound by the Dolphin Expressway (SR 836) to the north, the Seybold Canal (formerly Wagner Creek and Northwest Eighth Street Road to the east, by the Miami River to the southwest, and West 12th Avenue (SR 933) to the west.

== History ==
The area was first settled in the early 1840s when William English established a coontie starch mill in the area in the 1840s. By the 1850s, William Wagner and a business partner reestablished a coontie mill on a Miami River tributary which would be named after Wagner. A freshwater spring was found on the tributary in the area, which caused Henry Flagler to build the private Miami Water Company (where a Miami-Dade Water and Sewer Treatment plant is currently located) there in 1899.

By 1918, German-born Miami industrialist John Seybold dredged the Wagner Creek and constructed a turning basin in the creek, prompting area officials to rename the creek "Seybold Canal" in his honor; Seybold purchased and platted the peninsular plot of land immediately south of North 11th Street between the River and Creek for private, residential development, advertising it as one of Miami's premier housing communities into the Florida land boom of the 1920s.

In 1997 Spring Garden was designated as an official Historic District in the City of Miami. The summary statement from the historic designation report prepared by resident and architectural historian Prof. John Kneski states that "The Spring Garden Historic District is significant in the historical, archeological, and architectural heritage of the City of Miami. This neighborhood reflects the City’s growth from the mid-1910s to the 1940s and demonstrates the importance of the Miami River in the City’s history. Developed by an important pioneer businessman, Spring Garden is the oldest, intact, single family neighborhood still remaining along the Miami River."

== Gallery ==
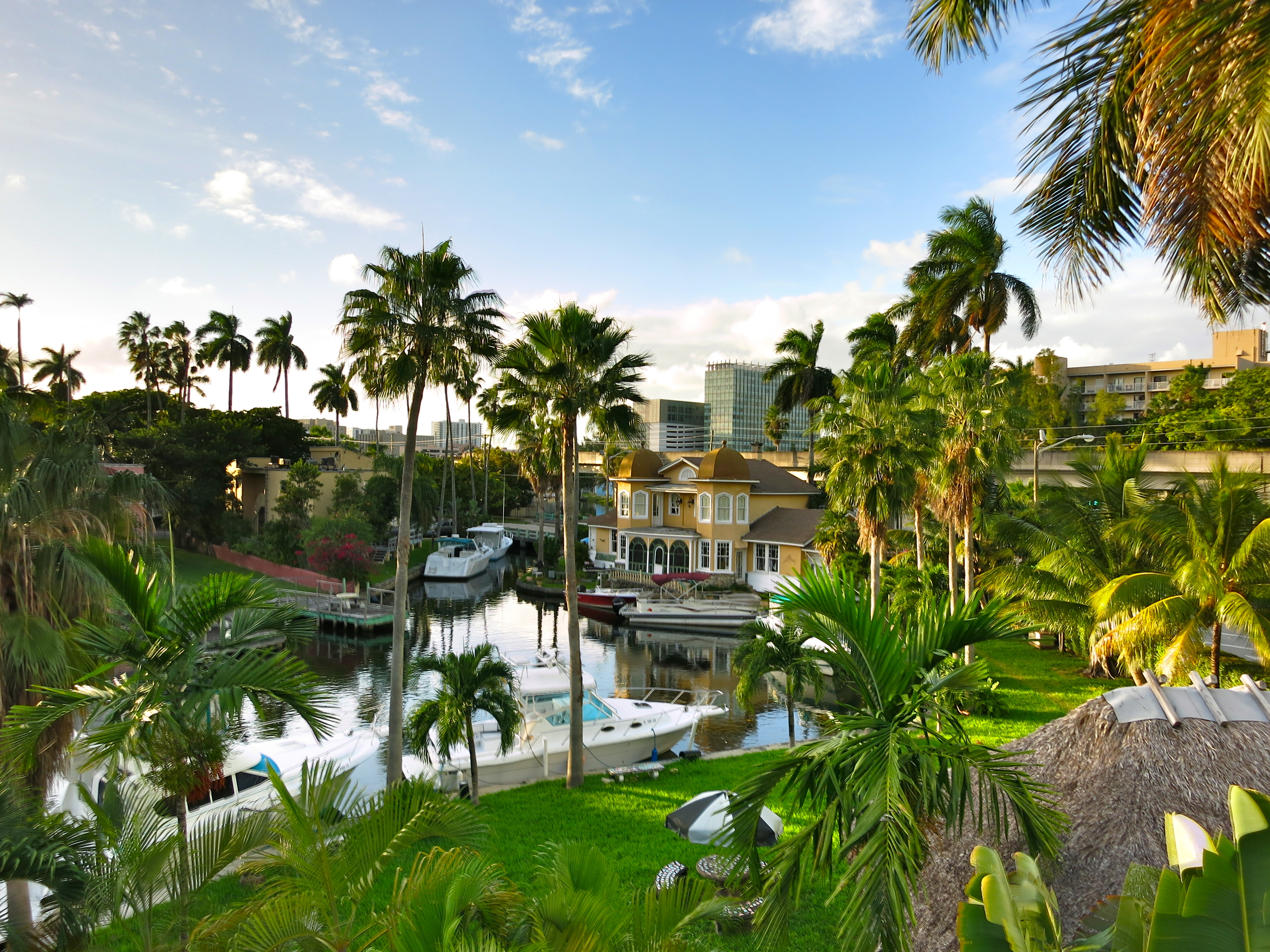
The Hindu Palace and Turning Basin of Seybold Canal

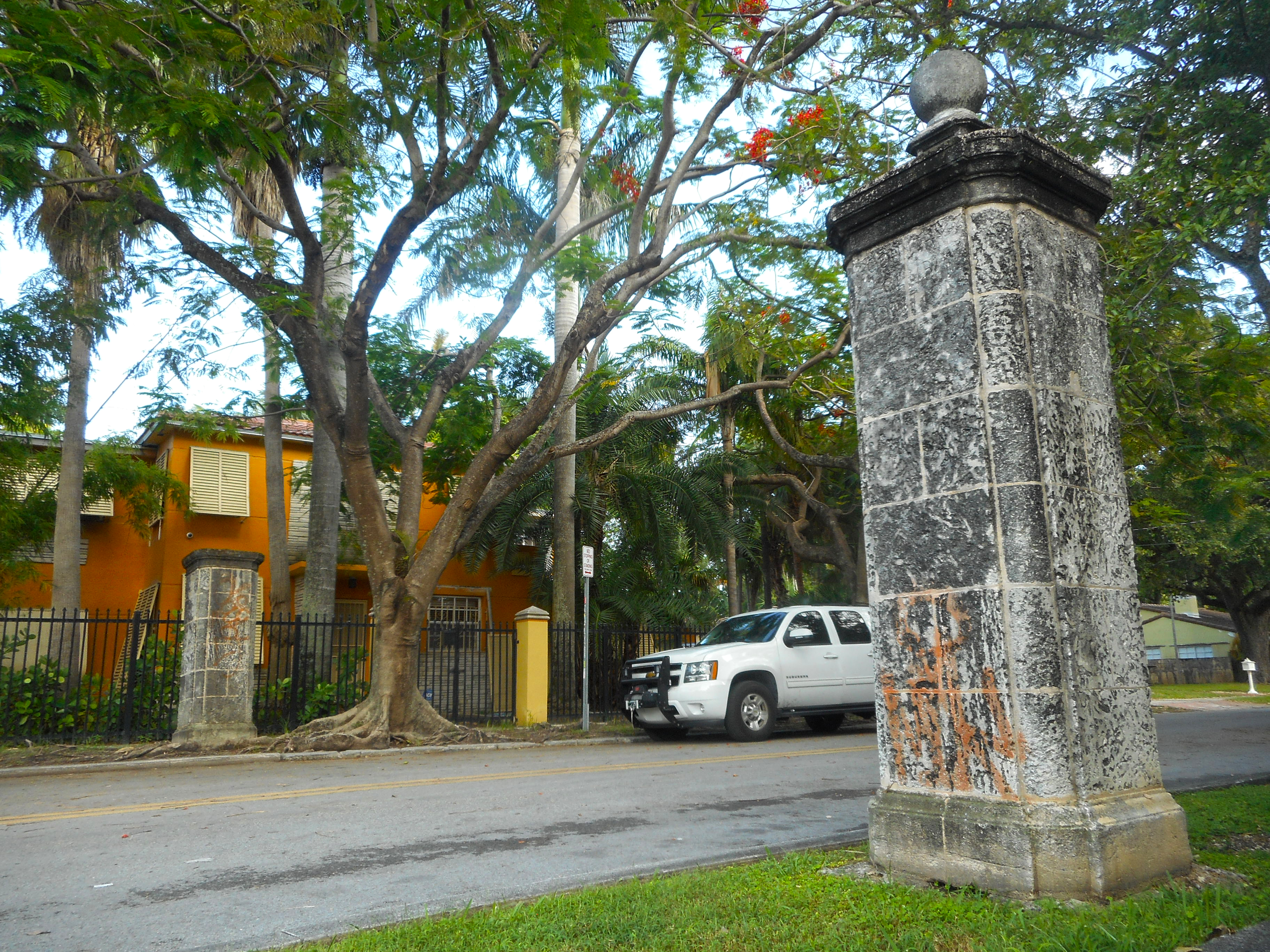
Oolite entrance columns to Country Club addition

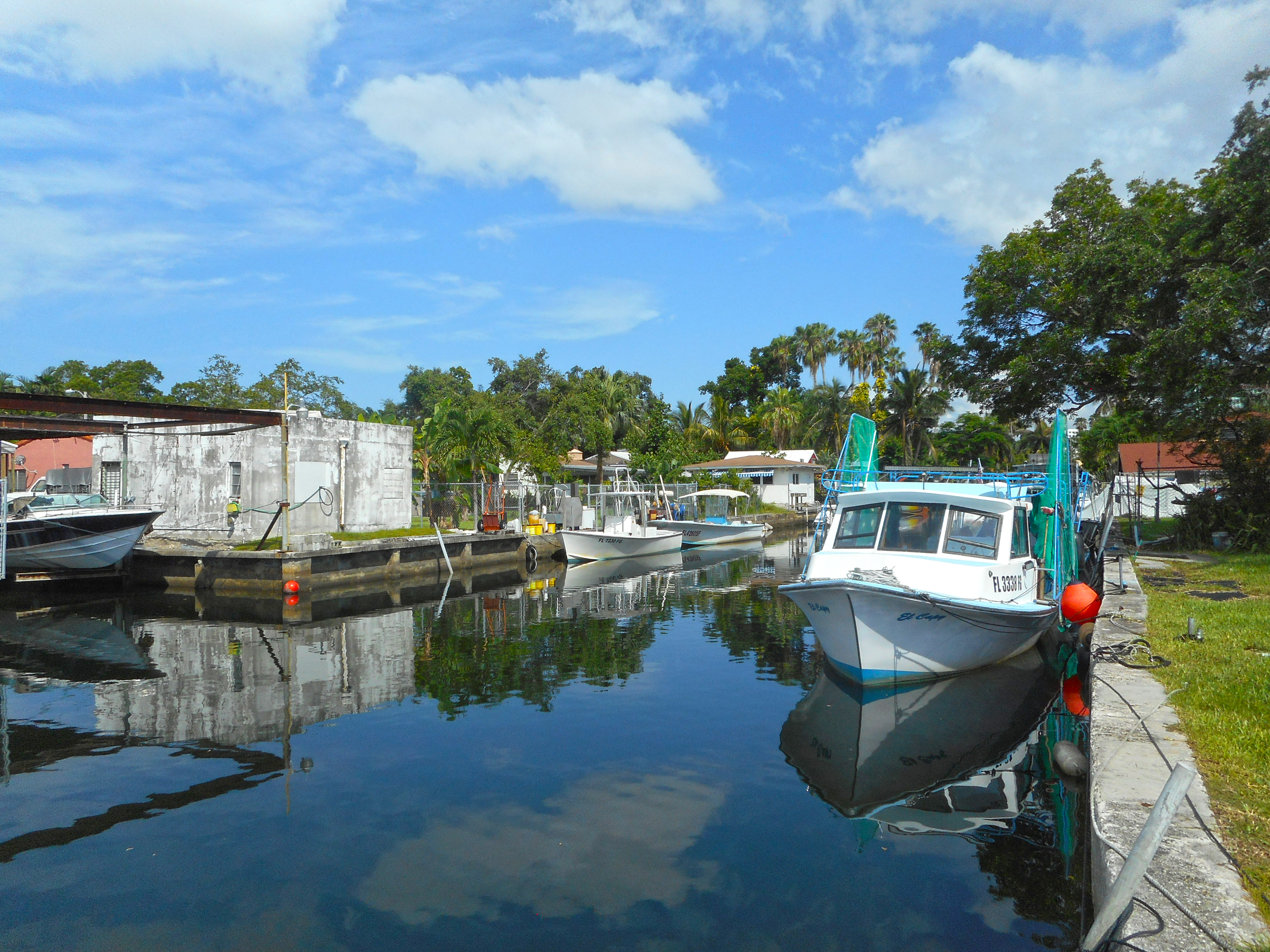
Seybold Canal near NW 9th Street view northwest

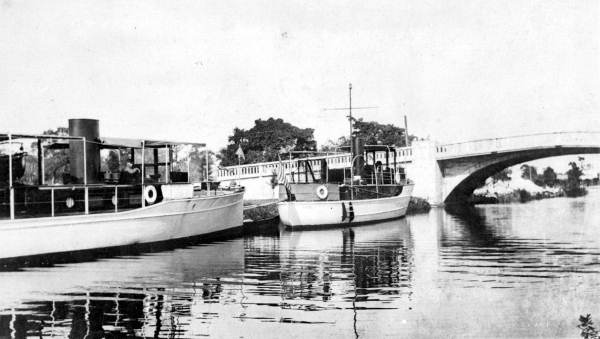
Steam yachts moored on the Seybold Canal near the 7th Street Bridge, c. 1920s.

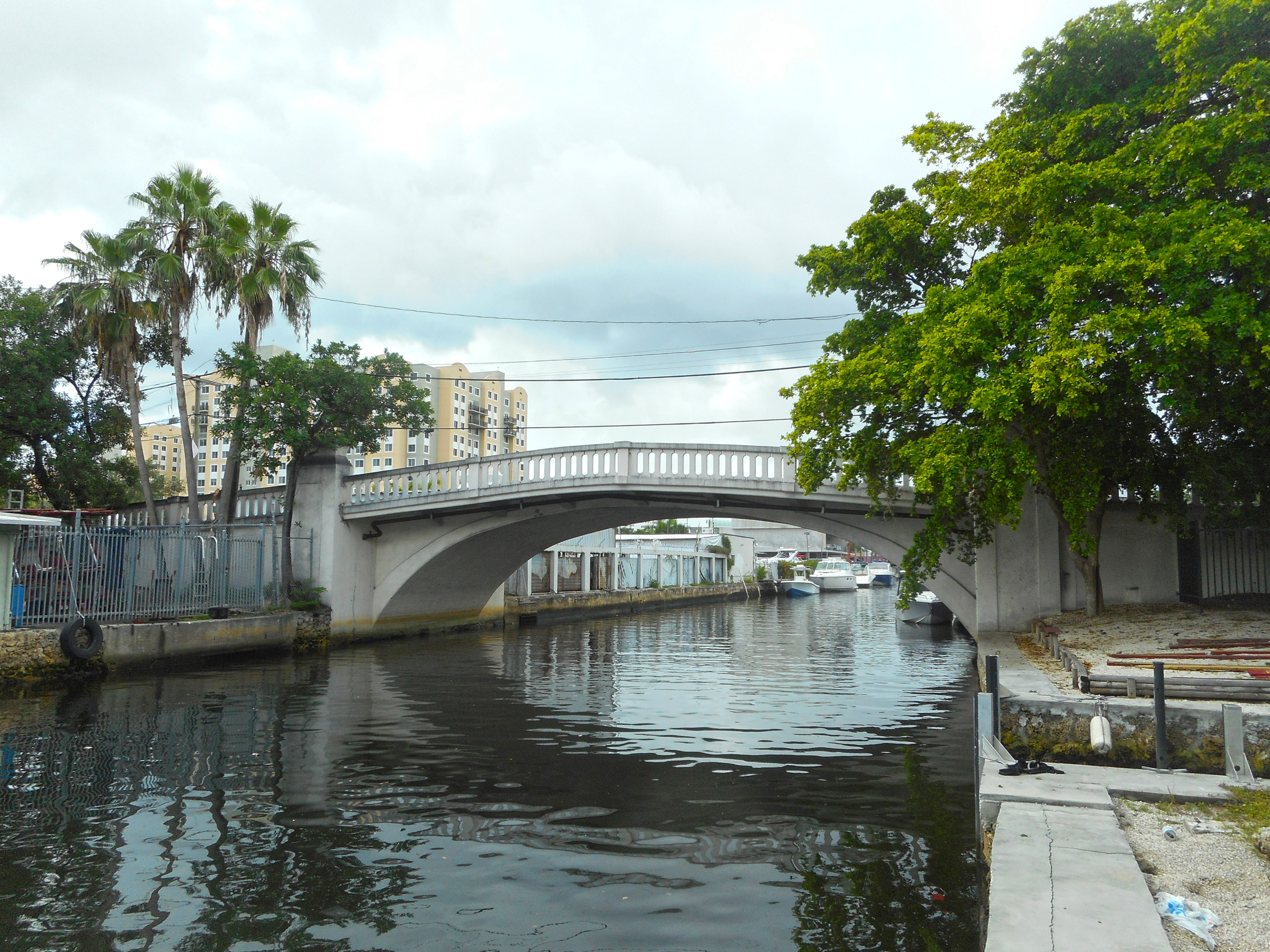
