= Cowhorn Creek =

Creek in eastern Texas

Location
- Country: United States

Physical characteristics
- Mouth
  - location: Texarkana, Texas
  - coordinates: 33°27′22″N 94°05′35″W

Cowhorn Creek is a creek in Bowie County, Texas. The creek rises in northeastern Texarkana and flows south, under several major highways including U.S. Route 82 and U.S. Route 67 before meeting Wagner Creek to the south of the city.
