= Nix Creek =

Creek in western Arkansas

Location
- Country: United States

Physical characteristics
- Mouth
  - location: Texarkana, Arkansas; Texarkana, Texas
  - coordinates: 33°27′38″N 94°01′20″W

Nix Creek is a creek in the Texarkana metropolitan area. The creek is mainly situated in Texarkana, Arkansas, but briefly crosses the border into Texarkana, Texas where it meets Days Creek alongside Swampoodle Creek. The creek passes under U.S. Route 82.
