= Swampoodle Creek =

Creek in eastern Texas

Location
- Country: United States

Physical characteristics
- Mouth
  - location: Texarkana, Texas
  - coordinates: 33°26′44″N 94°03′21″W

Swampoodle Creek is a creek in Bowie County, Texas. The creek rises in northern Texarkana and flows south, under several major highways including U.S. Route 82 and U.S. Route 67 before meeting Days Creek, alongside Nix Creek near the Arkansas border.
