= The National Irish American Museum of Washington, D.C. =

The National Irish American Museum Of Washington, D.C. is a proposed museum to honor Ireland’s legacy in America.

== History ==
The museum was proposed in 2008, but active fundraising was deferred due to the 2008 financial crisis, and in 2015 the Washington Post deemed the museum unlikely to ever open.

== Objective ==
The museum's objective is "to become a major cultural institution that will bring Irish-American history to life for visitors of all ages, from all ethnic, racial, and cultural backgrounds."

== National Irish American Virtual Museum ==
A "Virtual Museum" has been created with a short video and biographical sections on numerous Irish Americans from 1776 to the modern era in the fields of innovation, acting, the arts, leadership, legal, media, medical, military, music, science, technology, and sports.

== See also ==
- Cobh Heritage Centre
- Ireland’s Great Hunger Museum
