= Wagner Creek (Florida) =

Tributary of the Miami River in Florida, US

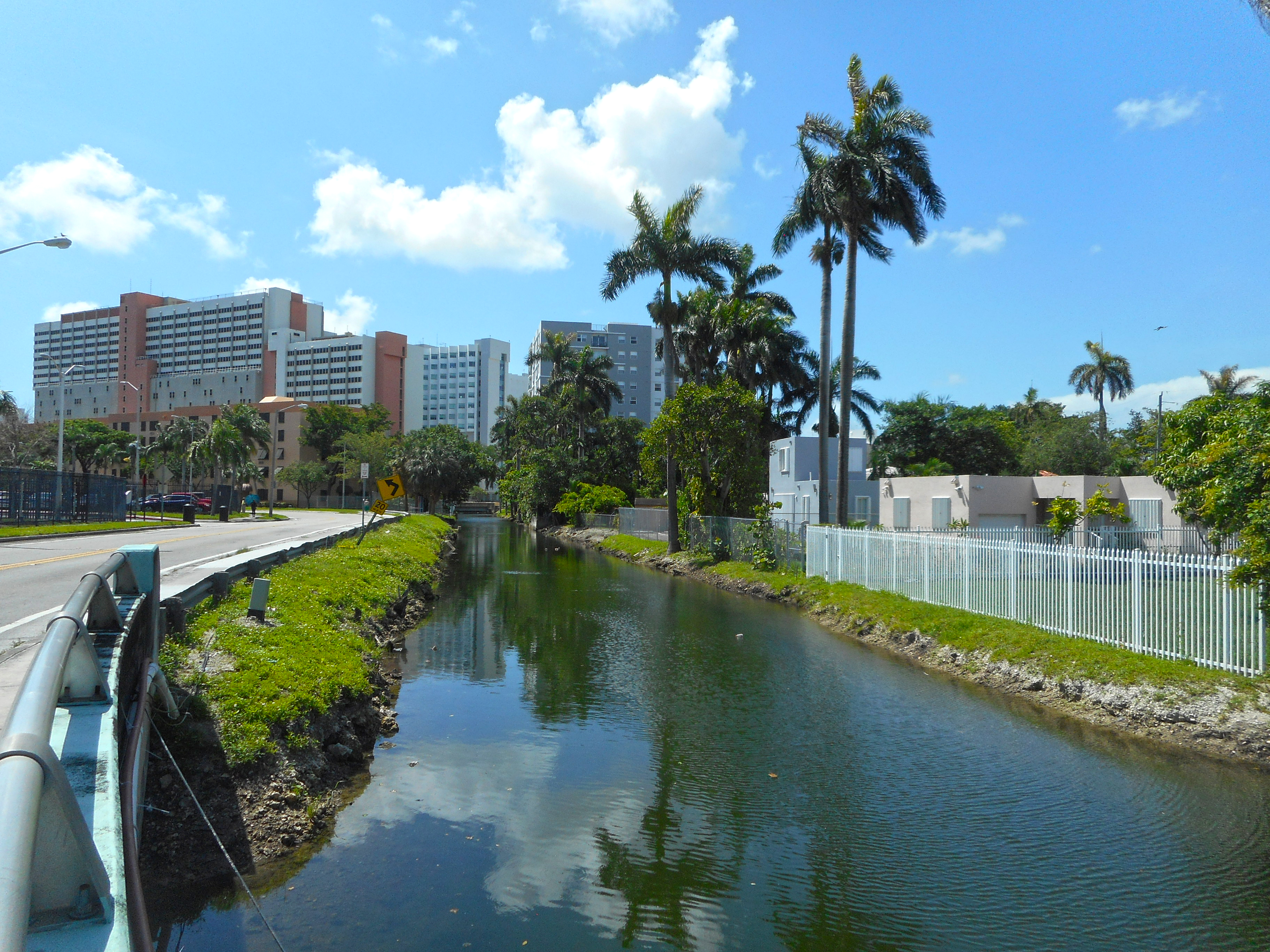
- Wagner Creek near NW 16th Street Bridge and 14th Avenue (southeast view)

Location
- Country: United States

Physical characteristics
- Source
  - location: Biscayne Aquifer in old Allapatah Prairie
  - elevation: 7 feet above sea level
- Mouth: Miami River
  - location: near NW 5th Street and 7th Avenue, Miami, Florida
  - coordinates: 25°46′44″N 80°12′26″W
- Length: 1.6 mi (2.6 km)

Wagner Creek is a tributary of the Miami River in Miami, Florida, that drains out of the Biscayne Aquifer in what used to be the Allapatah prairie and runs through the city of Miami neighborhoods of Allapatah, Spring Garden and Overtown.

== Description ==
The 1.6-mile (2.6 km) long tributary emerges above ground south of NW 20th Street between 15th and 17th avenues, from there it flows southeast in a straight line towards 15th Street, then east through Civic Center, it makes a sharp turn south along 12th Avenue for one block until 14th Street. From 14th Street, it runs again in a southeast direction passing under SR836 towards 11th Street, where it becomes a canal known as the Seybold Canal. Passing south of 11th Street it goes through the neighborhoods of Spring Garden to the west and Overtown to the east. From 11th Street it continues southeast (in a straight line) until 8th street, and then straight south for three blocks until it meets the Miami River west of NW 5th Street and 7th Avenue.

== History ==
=== Early settlements ===
The lower area of the creek (now known as the Seybold Canal) was first settled in the early 1840s when William English established a coontie starch mill in the area. By the 1850s, William Wagner and a business partner reestablished a coontie mill near the tributary which would later bear Wagner's name. A freshwater spring was found on the tributary in the area, which caused Henry Flagler to build the private Miami Water Company (where a Miami-Dade Water and Sewer Treatment plant is currently located) there in 1899.

=== The Seybold Canal ===
By 1919, German-born Miami industrialist John Seybold dredged Wagner Creek and constructed a turning basin in the creek, prompting area officials to rename the creek "Seybold Canal" in his honor; Seybold purchased and platted the peninsular plot of land immediately south of Northwest 11th Street between the River and Creek for private, residential development, advertising it as one of Miami's premier housing communities into the Florida land boom of the 1920s.

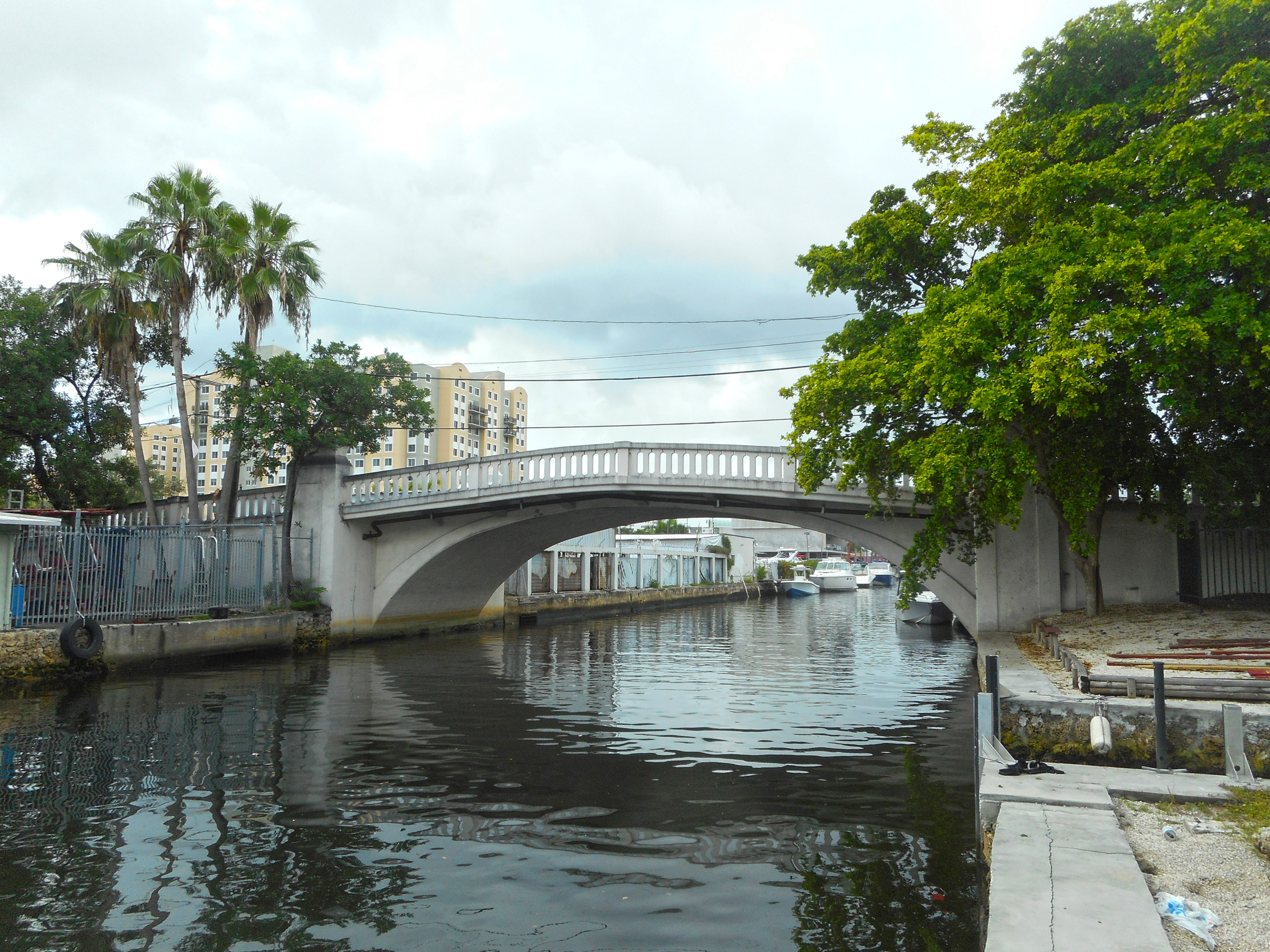
Hump Bridge on NW 7th Street and the canal

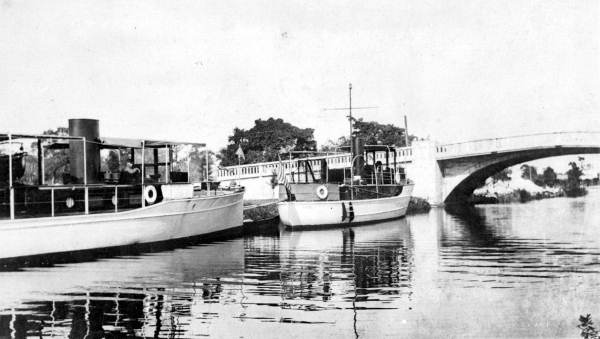
Steam yachts moored on the Seybold Canal near the 7th Street Bridge, c. 1920s.

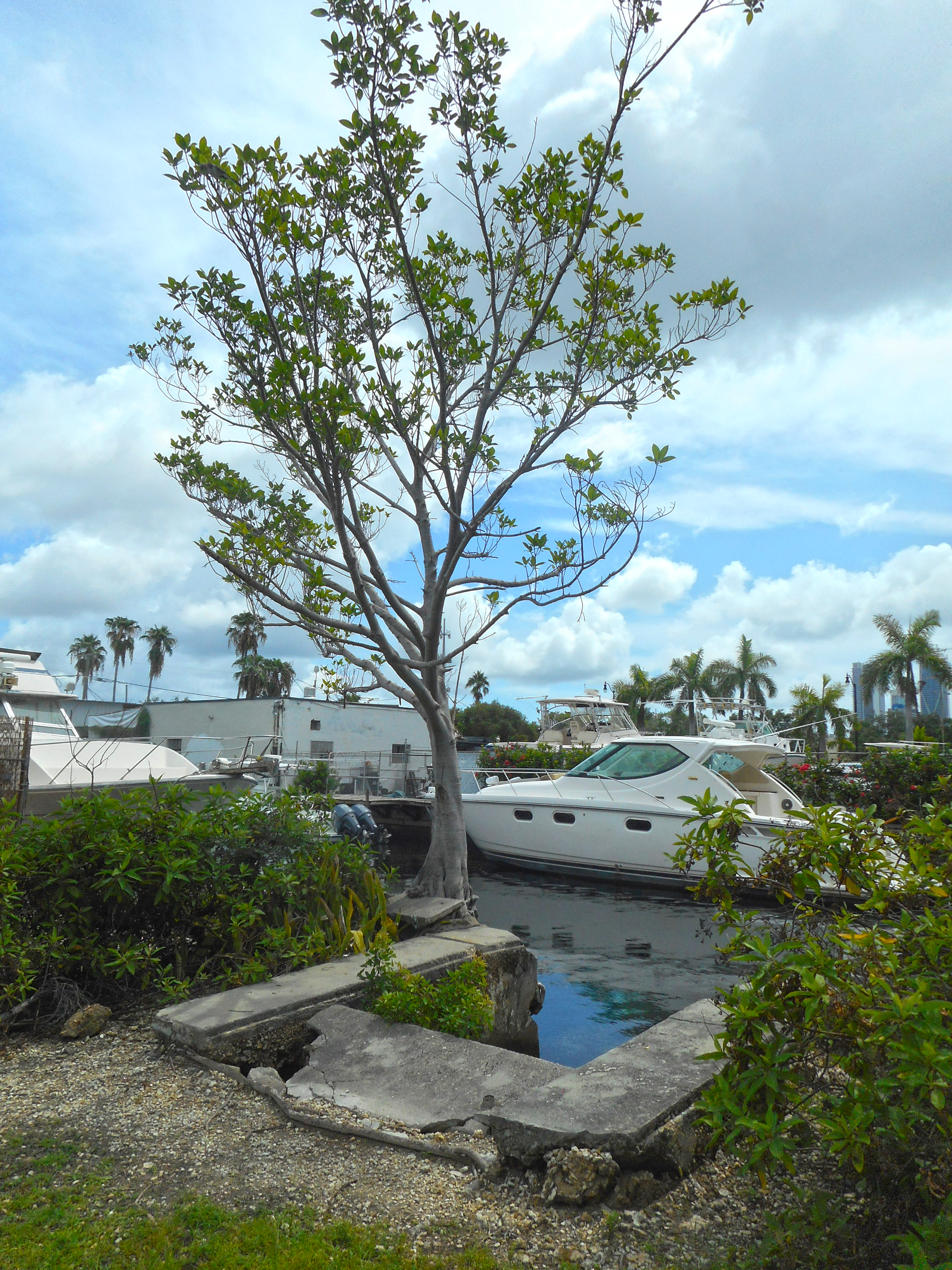
Steps leading to canal from Seybold house site

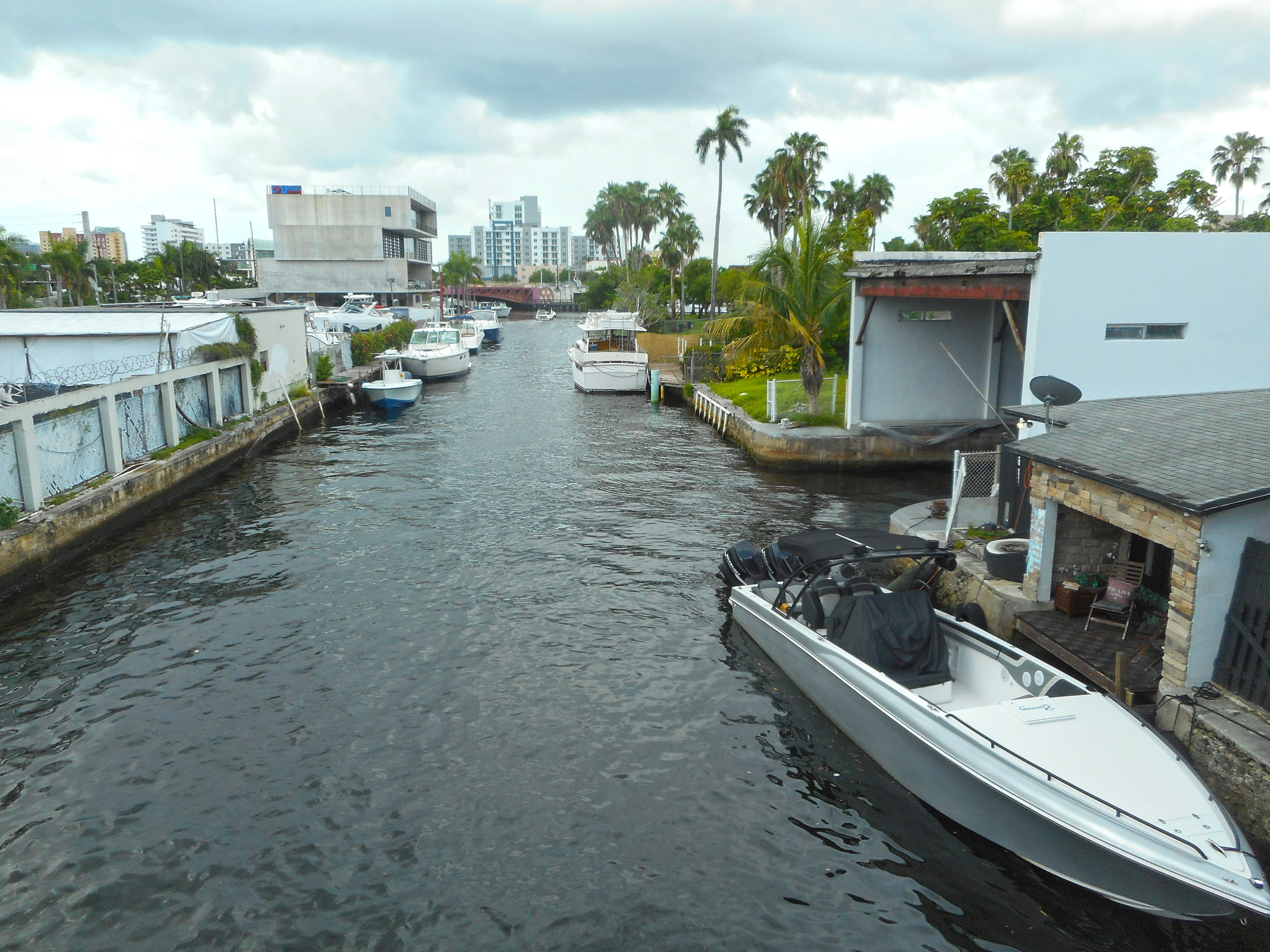
View downriver towards mouth on Miami River

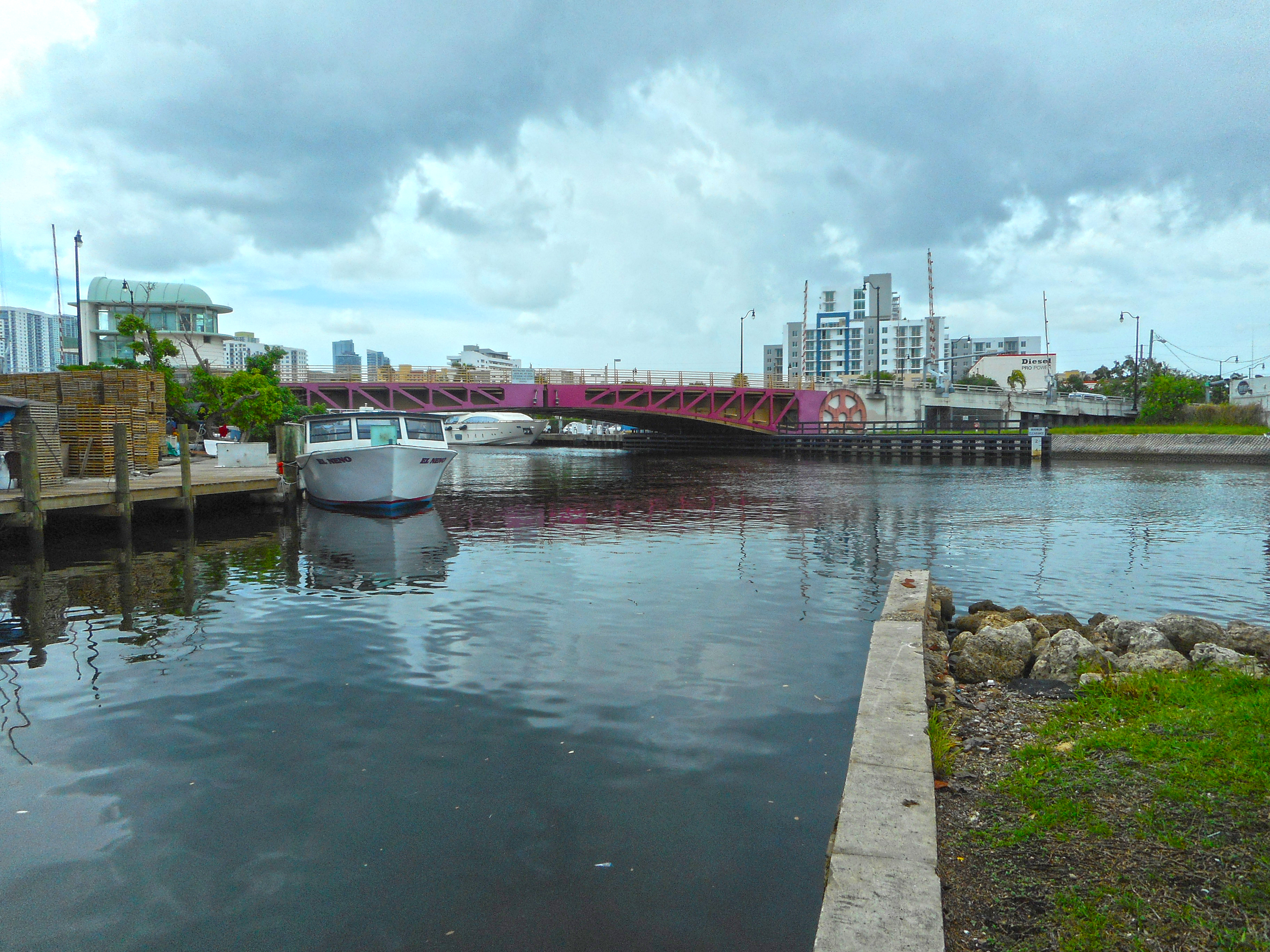
Mouth of Creek, Miami River and 5th Street Bridge

=== Neglect and restoration efforts ===
Due to many years of neglect, Wagner Creek and Seybold Canal became highly polluted, becoming known as Florida's most polluted waterway. No longer a freshwater creek, it was instead used as a dumping ground for various types of chemicals, garbage, fecal matter and stormwater runoff from the surrounding area. In 2003, the City of Miami submitted a maintenance dredging request on Wagner Creek upstream of NW 11th Street. As part of the approval process, samples of sediments and water were taken from the creek and tested. The results showed that a high percentage of dioxins, heavy metals and other contaminants were present. However, no further action was taken due to the Army Corps of Engineers dredging of the Miami River which took about five years. Between 2007 and 2009, a company called CH2M HILL hired by the city conducted further tests determined that about 61 tons of contaminated sediments needed to be removed. Finally in February 2015, the city announced that $20 million had been approved for the cleanup. On July 31, 2017 members of the City Commission and the Miami River Commission gathered in a ceremony to announce the beginning of the process of restoring the creek., The restoration, including removal of sediments, garbage and rehabilitation, took about a year and ended in May 2018.

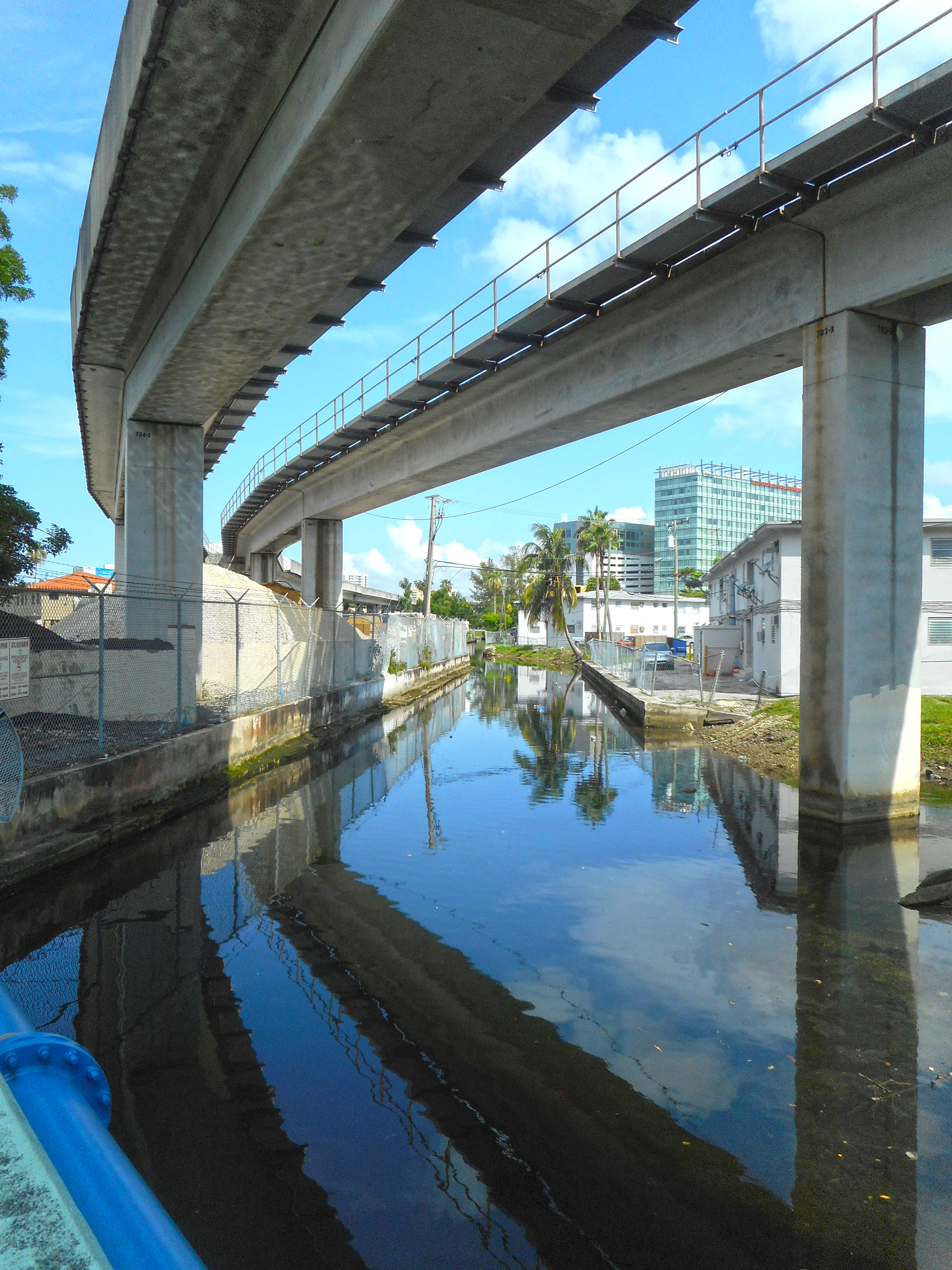
View of creek under Metrorail pylons from NW 11th Street bridge (view northwest)

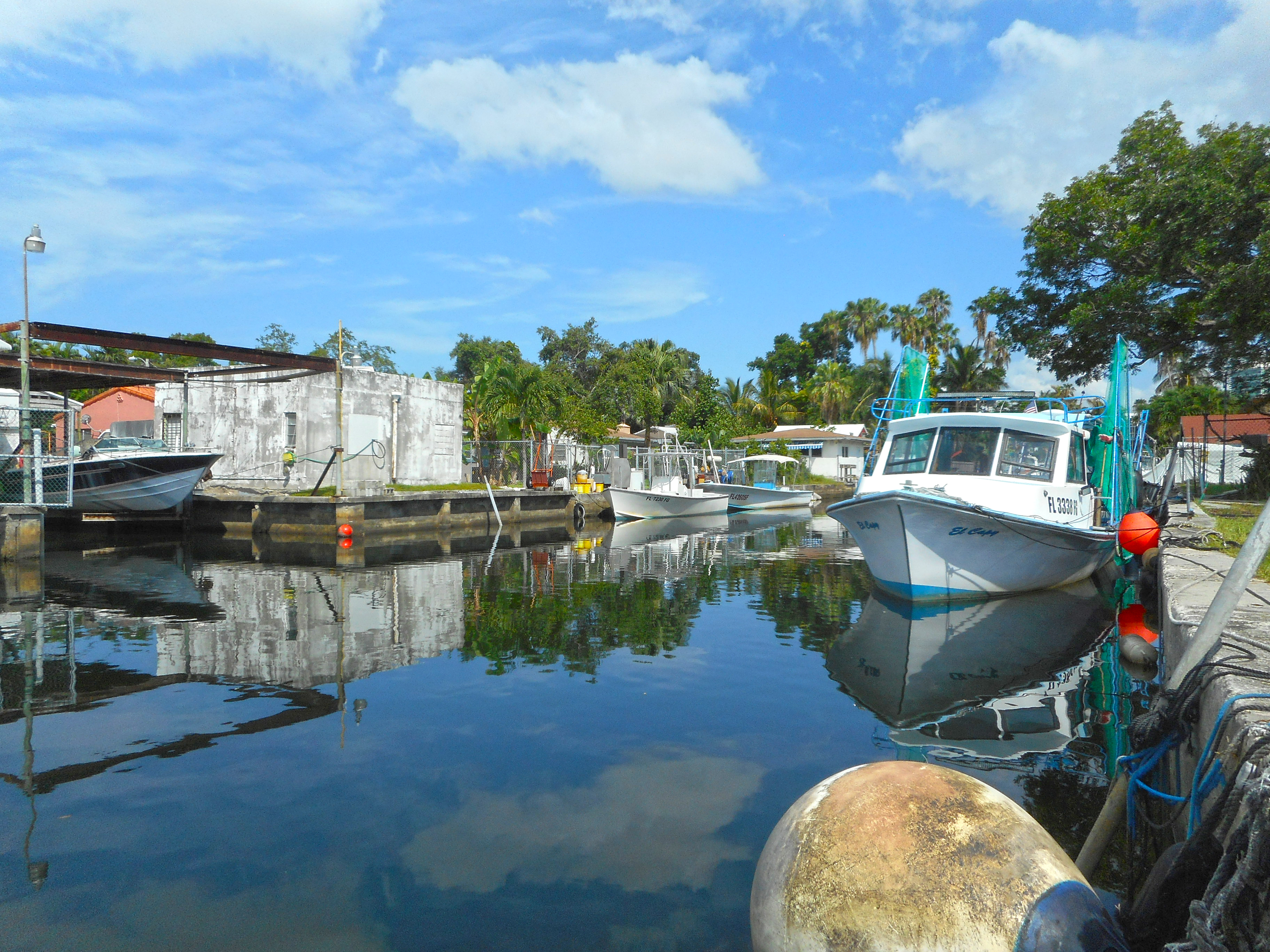
Seybold Canal near NW 9th Street (view northwest)

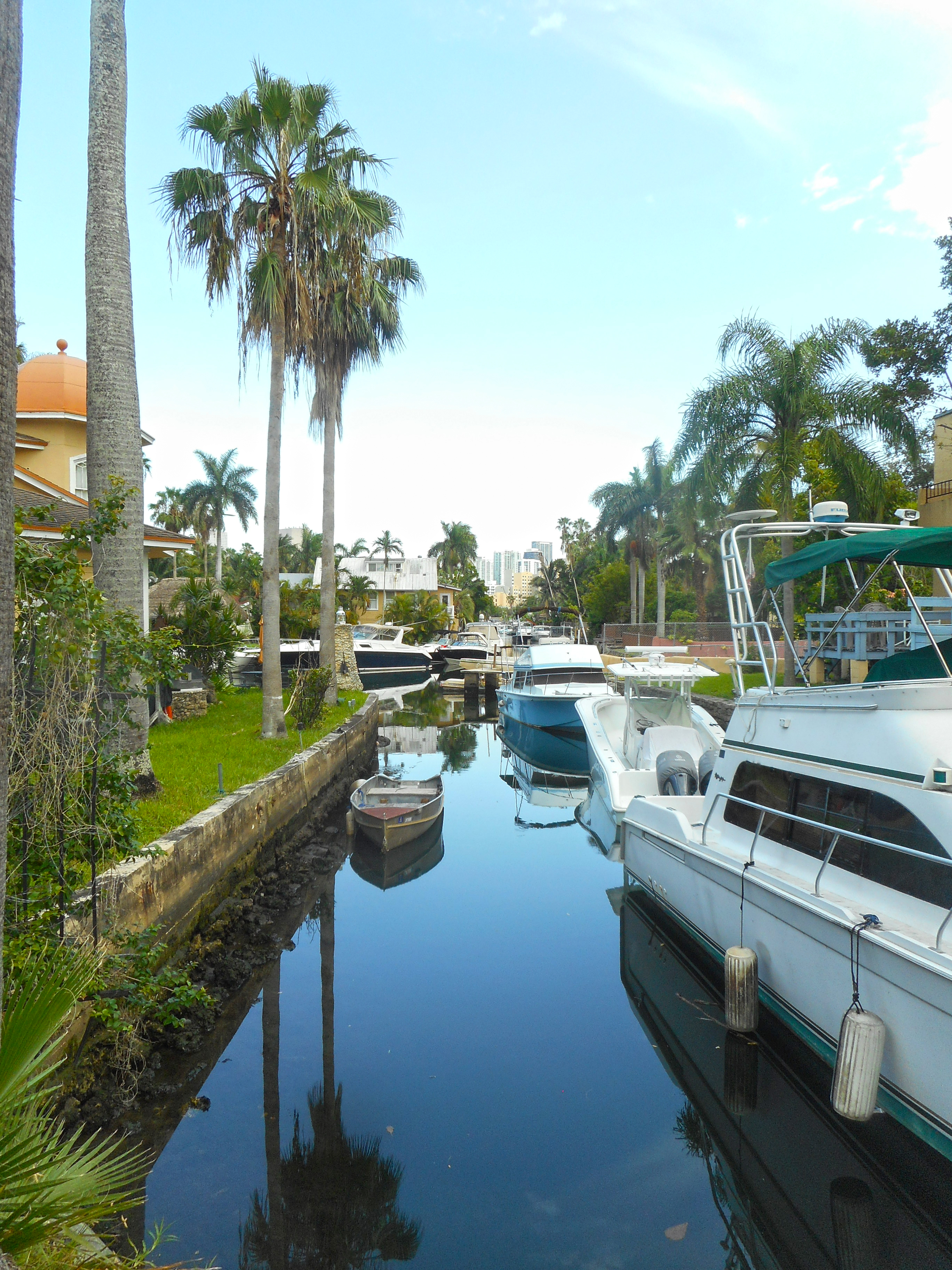
Canal downriver from 11th Street Bridge (turning basin in background)
