= Wagner Creek (Bear Creek tributary) =

Stream in Oregon, U.S.

Coordinates: 42°14′58″N 122°46′50″W

Wagner Creek is a stream in the U.S. state of Oregon. It is a tributary to Bear Creek.

Wagner Creek was named in 1852 after one Jacob Wagner.
