= Wagner Creek (Texas) =

Creek in eastern Texas

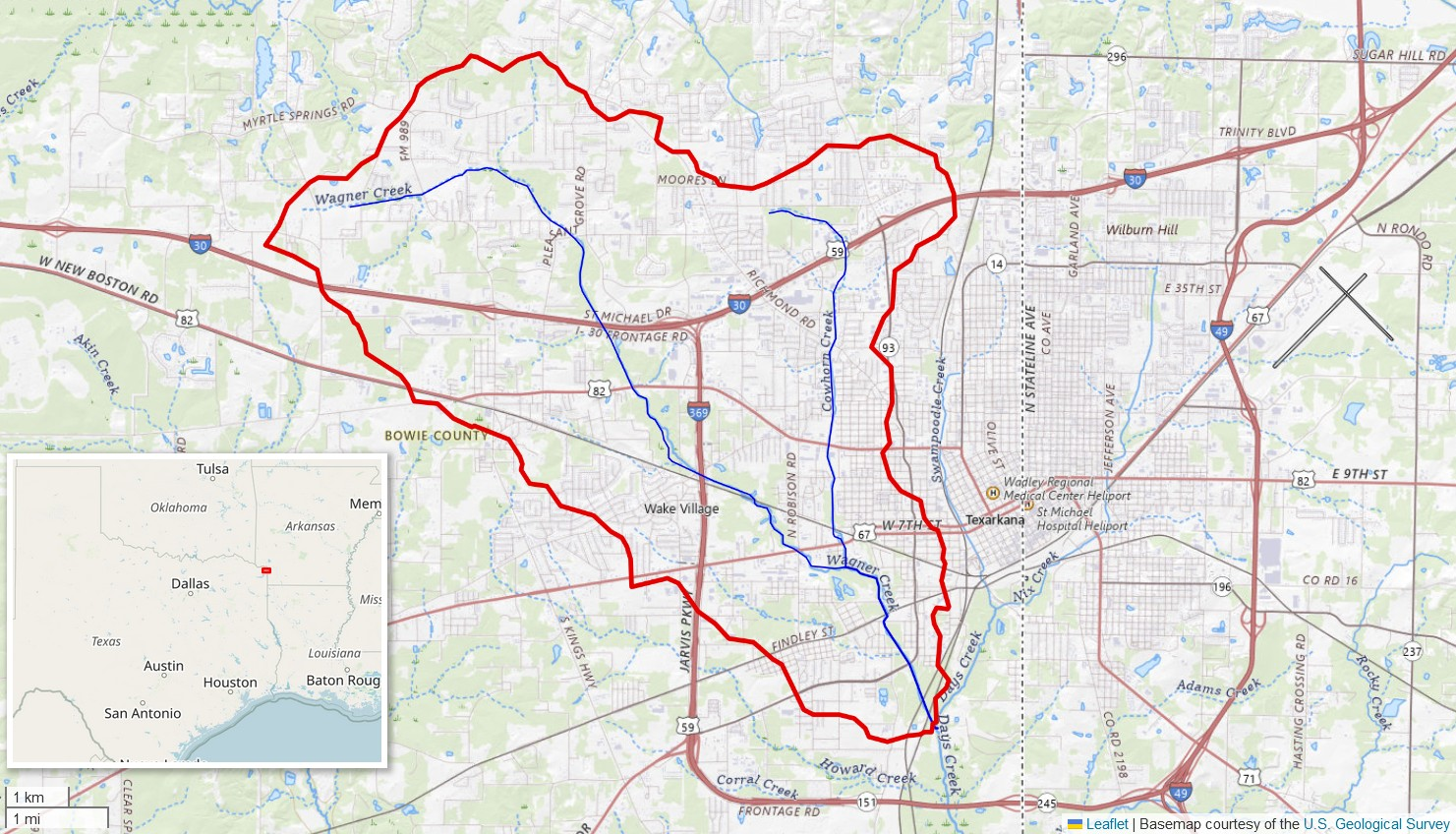
- Wagner Creek watershed (Interactive map)

Location
- Country: United States

Physical characteristics
- Source
  - location: West of County Road 2213 near Red Lick
  - coordinates: 33.468°N 94.163°W
- Mouth
  - location: Nash, Texas
  - coordinates: 33.4640°N 94.1196°W

Wagner Creek is a creek in Bowie County, Texas. The creek rises north of Nash and flows south-east, under several major highways including I-30, U.S. Route 82, I-369, before meeting Days Creek in southern Texarkana.

Cowhorn Creek flows into the creek to the south of U.S. Route 67.
