= Robert Emmet (Connor) =

Bronze statue of Robert Emmet by Jerome Connor

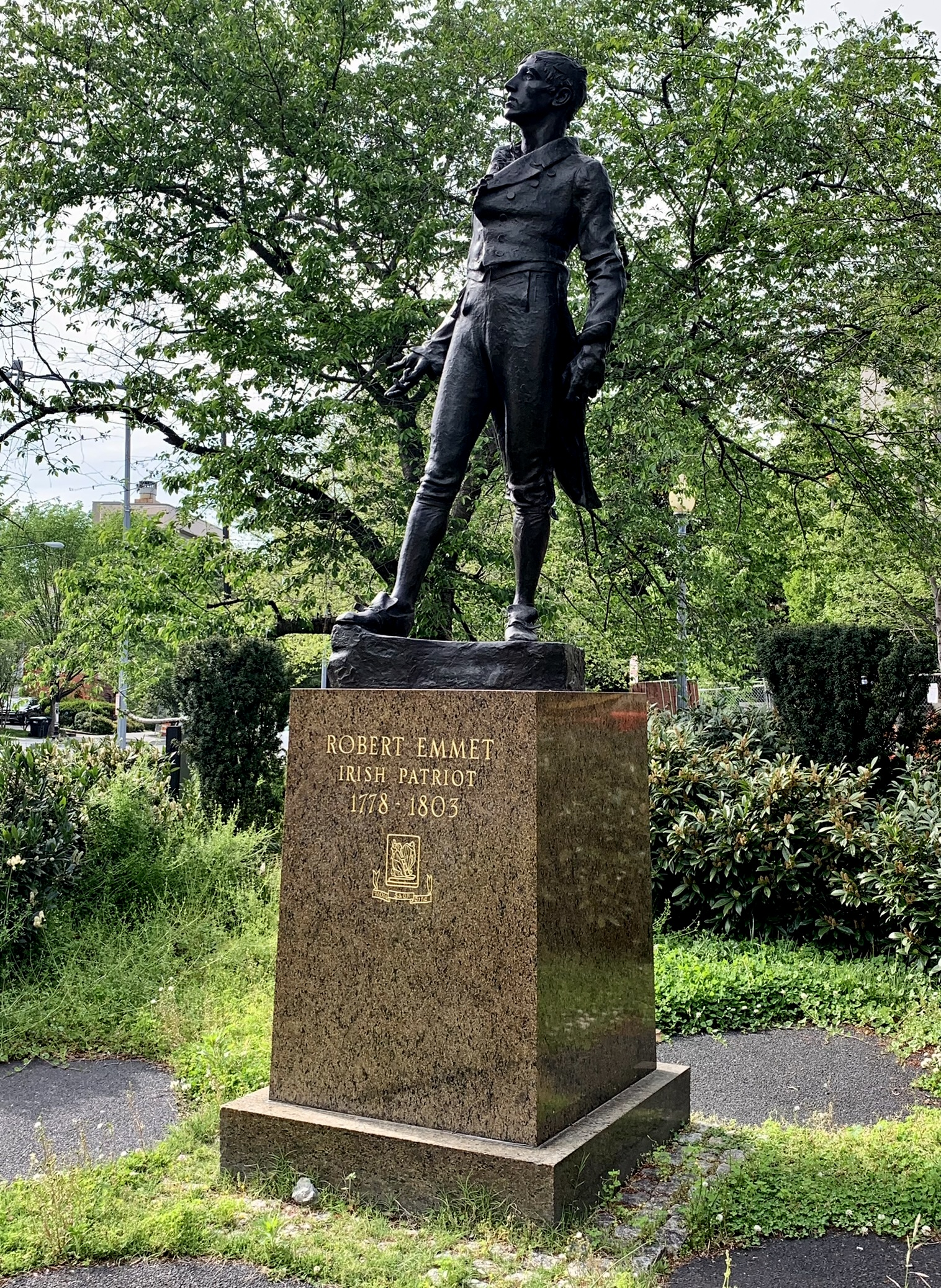
- Robert Emmet statue in Washington, D.C.
- Artist: Jerome Connor
- Year: 1916
- Type: Bronze
- Dimensions: 210 cm × 97 cm × 58 cm (82 in × 38 in × 23 in)
- Location: Washington, D.C. (1916); San Francisco (1919); Dublin; Emmetsburg, Iowa; 38.913889°N 77.052778°W
- Owner: Smithsonian Institution

Robert Emmet is a bronze statue of Robert Emmet by Jerome Connor. There are four examples: Massachusetts Avenue and 24th Street, N.W. Washington, D.C.; St Stephen's Green, Dublin; Golden Gate Park, San Francisco; Emmetsburg, Iowa.

The San Francisco example was dedicated on July 20, 1919. The Washington example was cast in 1916, and was dedicated on June 28, 1917. It was rededicated on April 22, 1966. The statue was a gift to the Smithsonian Institution on loan to the National Park Service.

The inscription reads:
(On right side of bronze base of sculpture:)
JEROME CONNOR
1916
(Front of stone base:)
Robert Emmet
Irish Patriot
1778–1803
"Lidia-saon-eine"
(On plaque, back of base:)
"I WISHED TO PROCURE FOR MY
COUNTRY THE GUARANTEE WHICH
WASHINGTON PROCURED FOR AMERICA
I HAVE PARTED FROM EVERYTHING
THAT WAS DEAR TO ME IN THIS LIFE
FOR MY COUNTRY'S CAUSE
WHEN MY COUNTRY TAKES HER PLACE
AMONG THE NATIONS OF THE
EARTH, THEN, AND NOT TILL THEN
LET MY EPITAPH BE WRITTEN"
Extracts from Emmet's speech
from the dock September 19, 1803

== See also ==
- List of public art in Washington, D.C., Ward 2
