= Old Boston, Texas =

- Unincorporated community
- Location within Texas Location within the United States
- Coordinates: 33°24′14″N 94°24′59″W
- Country: United States
- State: Texas
- County: Bowie
- Elevation: 351 ft (107 m)
- Time zone: UTC-6 (Central (CST))
  - Summer (DST): UTC-5 (CDT)
- Area codes: 903 & 430
- GNIS feature ID: 1364395

Old Boston is an unincorporated community located in Bowie County, Texas, United States. According to the Handbook of Texas, the community had a population of 100 in 2000. It is located within the Texarkana metropolitan area.

== History ==
Old Boston was settled in the early 1830s and named for store owner W. J. Boston. It was selected as the county seat of the newly formed county in 1841. A post office was established at Old Boston in 1846 with LD Vandike as postmaster. Old Boston became a thriving farm community and was home to several wealthy planters who lived on the Red River. Its population zenith was reported to be between 300 and 400 during the 1860s. In 1876, the Texas and Pacific Railway passed four miles north of Old Boston, prompting a population shift to the tracks, forming the community of New Boston. This caused the population of the original Boston community to shrink to just 75 residents in the early 1880s. By the middle of that decade, Texarkana became the county seat, causing the population to continue to go down to 50. It eventually began to be called Old Boston when the county seat was proposed by residents to be in the geographic center of the county and the post office moved 2.5 miles north of the original Boston. There were two businesses, three churches, and a cemetery in Old Boston in 1984. In 2000, the population was 100.

The community was established while Texas was still a part of Mexico. Mail was delivered to the community from Arkansas on horseback. A battalion was formed in Old Boston to fight during the Texas Revolution. Several stores surrounded the courthouse. Texas governors Hardin R. Runnels and SWT Lanham lived here for a time.

== Geography ==
Old Boston is located 4 mi (6.4 km) south of New Boston in south-central Bowie County. It is also located 2.5 mi (4.0 km) south of Boston on Texas State Highway 8.

== Education ==
Old Boston is served by the New Boston Independent School District. It had 3 private schools in operation for a time.
