= The Town That Dreaded Sundown =

The Town That Dreaded Sundown may refer to:

- The Town That Dreaded Sundown (1976 film), a horror film loosely based on the 1946 Texarkana Moonlight Murders
- The Town That Dreaded Sundown (2014 film), a horror film and loose sequel of the 1976 film
