= National Register of Historic Places listings in Bowie County, Texas =

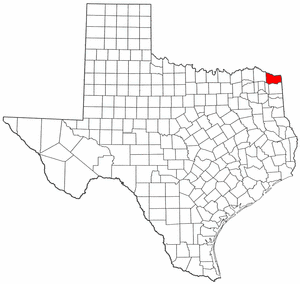
Location of Bowie County in Texas

This is a list of the National Register of Historic Places listings in Bowie County, Texas.

This is intended to be a complete list of properties and districts listed on the National Register of Historic Places in Bowie County, Texas. There are one district and 17 individual properties listed on the National Register in the county. Seven individually listed properties are Recorded Texas Historic Landmarks including one that is also a State Antiquities Landmark. An additional property is also part of a State Antiquities Landmark.

This National Park Service list is complete through NPS recent listings posted March 21, 2025.

== Current listings ==
The publicly disclosed locations of National Register properties and districts may be seen in a mapping service provided.

| | Name on the Register | Image | Date listed | Location | City or town | Description |
|---|---|---|---|---|---|---|
| 1 | Bowie County Jail | Bowie County Jail | November 16, 1977 (#77001429) | Public Sq. 33°26′32″N 94°25′18″W | Boston | Part of a State Antiquities Landmark |
| 2 | Draughon-Moore House | Draughon-Moore House | June 29, 1976 (#76002007) | 420 Pine St. 33°25′27″N 94°02′39″W | Texarkana | Recorded Texas Historic Landmark |
| 3 | Earl-Rochelle House | Earl-Rochelle House | July 1, 1999 (#99000720) | 1920 Magnolia St. 33°26′08″N 94°02′37″W | Texarkana | Recorded Texas Historic Landmark |
| 4 | Garland Community School Teacherage | | March 6, 2002 (#02000146) | Farm to Market Road 1701, 2.5 mi. W of Dekalb; 33°30′58″N 94°40′11″W | DeKalb | Historic and Architectural Resources Associated with the Rosenwald School Program in Texas |
| 5 | Hotel Grim | Hotel Grim | June 7, 2016 (#16000348) | 301 N. State Line Ave. 33°25′21″N 94°02′36″W | Texarkana | |
| 6 | Hotel McCartney | Hotel McCartney | September 6, 1979 (#79002920) | Corner of Front and Main Streets; 33°25′13″N 94°02′35″W | Texarkana | |
| 7 | Offenhauser Insurance Building | Offenhauser Insurance Building | February 25, 1971 (#71000922) | State Line Ave. and 3rd St. 33°25′20″N 94°02′36″W | Texarkana | Recorded Texas Historic Landmark |
| 8 | Rialto Building | Rialto Building | June 17, 1982 (#82004493) | 317 State Line Ave. 33°25′24″N 94°02′36″W | Texarkana | Recorded Texas Historic Landmark |
| 9 | Roseborough Lake Site | | July 6, 1976 (#76002008) | Address restricted | Texarkana | |
| 10 | Saenger Theater | Saenger Theater | July 12, 1978 (#78002897) | 219 Main St. 33°25′18″N 94°02′41″W | Texarkana | State Antiquities Landmark, Recorded Texas Historic Landmark |
| 11 | Texarkana Junior College and Texas High School | Texarkana Junior College and Texas High School | March 31, 2014 (#14000102) | W. 16th & Pine Sts. 33°26′02″N 94°03′04″W | Texarkana | |
| 12 | Texarkana National Bank | Texarkana National Bank | April 21, 2021 (#100006403) | 100 East Broad St. 33°25′17″N 94°02′35″W | Texarkana | |
| 13 | Texarkana National Bank (Motor Bank and Parking Garage) | | April 21, 2021 (#100006491) | 217 Pine St. 33°25′19″N 94°02′37″W | Texarkana | |
| 14 | Texarkana Phase Archeological District | | August 14, 1973 (#73001959) | Address restricted | Texarkana | |
| 15 | Texarkana Union Station | Texarkana Union Station | November 19, 1978 (#78000611) | State Line and Front St. 33°25′12″N 94°02′33″W | Texarkana | Extends into Miller County, Arkansas |
| 16 | Texarkana US Post Office and Courthouse | Texarkana US Post Office and Courthouse | March 24, 2000 (#00000245) | 5th St. and State Line Ave. 33°25′32″N 94°02′35″W | Texarkana | Recorded Texas Historic Landmark; extends into Miller County, Arkansas |
| 17 | Tilson Mounds-Summerhill Lake Place (41BW14) | | January 16, 1987 (#86003637) | Bowie County 2320 and Cabe Rd. | Texarkana | |
| 18 | Whitaker House | Whitaker House | November 7, 1979 (#79002921) | 517 Whitaker St. 33°25′19″N 94°03′25″W | Texarkana | Recorded Texas Historic Landmark |

== See also ==
- National Register of Historic Places listings in Texas
- Recorded Texas Historic Landmarks in Bowie County
