= Jeff D. Leach =

American businessman and microbiome researcher

Jeffrey Dean Leach (born 1967 in Boston, Texas, known as Jeff Leach) is an American businessman and microbiome researcher from Texas. He is known for his work on the gut microbiome of the Hadza hunter gatherers, founding the Human Food Project, publishing archeology magazines, deceptive business practices, being accused of sexual assault, and founding the Naked Pizza restaurant chain.

== Research ==
Leach studied archaeology at the University of Texas and New Mexico State University. In the 1990s, Leach was affiliated to the Center for Archaeological Research at the University of Texas at San Antonio, co-founded the Center for Indigenous Research in El Paso, Texas with Ray Maudlin.

He then founded the Paleobiotics lab in New Mexico and collaborated with Kristin Sobolik of the University of Maine. In 2012 he co-founded the Human Food Project and the American Gut Project with Jack Gilbert and Rob Knight, publishing results in 2018. As part of his work on the gut microbiome of the Tanzanian Hadza hunter gatherers he had a fecal transplant from a Hadza man. This was criticized by anthropologist John Hawks and science writer Ed Yong, who said of the idea of inducing a healthy microbiome that "This reasoning is faulty".

He was a visiting research fellow at King's College London. In 2010 he said he was studying for a Ph.D. at the University of Leicester and in 2019 he said he was pursuing a Ph.D. at the University of York.

== Business ==
In the late 1990s and early 2000s, Leach was the publisher of Discover Archaeology (launched in 1998), Dinosaur Magazine, Egypt Revealed, and Archeology Today. He used Beto O'Rourke's web design company Stanton Street Design. In 2003, a court in Texas found he had sold subscriptions for magazines that had closed and had charged for a tour of the Middle East that did not happen. Details of this civil court case were recently published in Science magazine "Leach was found to have violated laws against deceptive trade practices. The Texas attorney general alleged that Leach had sold subscriptions to magazines that had stopped publishing and had accepted more than $100,000 in payments for a tour in Egypt that was to feature the actor Omar Sharif, but was never organized. Leach failed to contest the claims and the court found them admitted and proven."

In 2001, he was involved with Mike Kammerer in plans to find Amelia Earhart's plane.

Leach co-founded Naked Pizza, originally called World's Healthiest Pizza, in New Orleans in 2006 with Randy Crochet, aiming to create a healthy pizza. They used whole grains and inulin from agave. They recovered after Hurricane Katrina destroyed their restaurant and gained investors, notably Mark Cuban in 2009, who encouraged them to use social media to attract further investment including from the Kraft family. Leach sold his share as expansion plans failed and the flagship store closed in 2016. While running Naked Pizza, Leach and a man named Jeff Reifman won a competition in 2009 to find Wired journalist Evan Ratliff, who was in hiding for a month.

Leach moved to ghost town Terlingua from Austin in 2013. In 2017 he founded Basecamp Terlingua, a holiday rentals company. In 2019, he founded a company marketing the alcoholic drink sotol and a festival dedicated to the drink with his girlfriend.

== Personal life ==
He grew up in Boston, Texas and is from Austin, Texas. With his ex-wife he has a daughter, born around 2000, whose type 1 diabetes diagnosis aged 2 led him into researching healthy food and biology. His children and their mother lived in Canada in 2010.

In late 2019, Leach was accused of multiple counts of assault by four women and a man, including sexual assault. Leach denies the allegations and unsuccessfully sued an accuser for defamation, though his appeal to the Eighth Court of Appeals in El Paso in March 2020 is still pending. Airbnb removed his Basecamp Terlingua from its listings in November 2019, following the allegations. He was indicted by a grand jury in February 2020 for an alleged 2014 assault, with a $20,000 bond from Brewster County sheriff's office. At a hearing in December 2020, Leach declined a plea deal by DA Sandy Wilson and Judge Roy Ferguson confirmed that the case would go to trial, likely in August 2021. The indictment was subsequently dropped, and a prolonged defamation case initiated against the accusers.

== Works ==
- Smits, SA; Leach, J; Sonnenburg, ED; Gonzalez, CG; Lichtman, JS; Reid, G; Knight, R; Manjurano, A; Changalucha, J; Elias, JE; Dominguez-Bello, MG; Sonnenburg, JL (August 1, 2017). "Seasonal cycling in the gut microbiome of the Hadza hunter-gatherers of Tanzania". Science. 357 (6353): 802–806. doi:10.1126/science.aan4834. PMC 5891123. PMID 28839072.
- Leach, Jeff D. (2012). Honor Thy Symbionts. CreateSpace Independent Publishing Platform. ISBN 9781481258791.
- Leach, Jeff (2013). Bloom: Reconnecting With Your Primal Gut in a Modern World. Victory Belt Publishing. ISBN 9781936608294.
- Leach, Jeff D. (2015). Rewild. CreateSpace Independent Publishing Platform. ISBN 9781515355410.
