= Hotel Grim (Texarkana, Texas) =

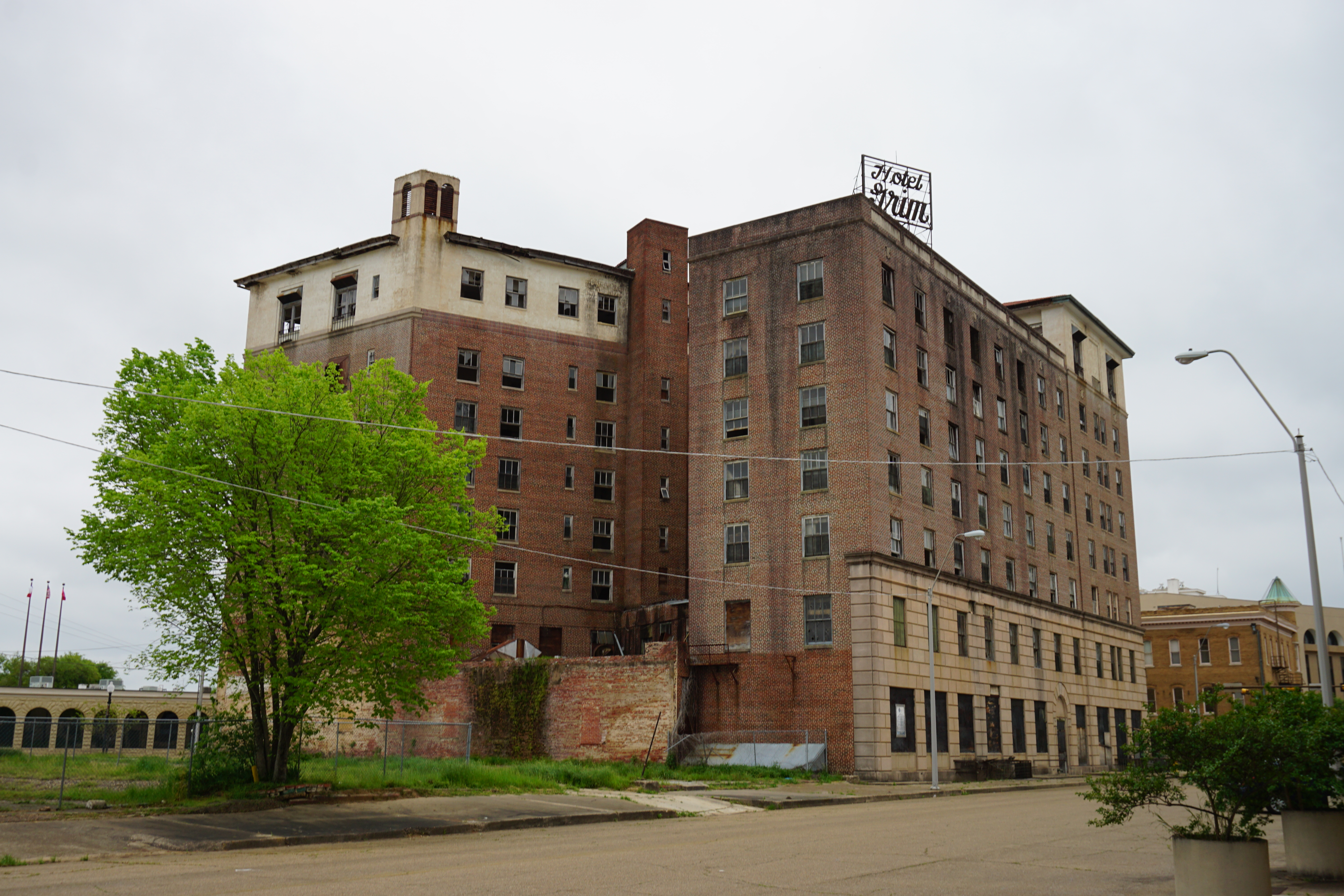
- Hotel Grim during 2016
- Alternative names: Lofts At The Grim

General information
- Type: Residential
- Location: 301 North State Line Avenue; Texarkana, Texas, 75501; United States
- Completed: 1924
- Opening: 1925

Technical details
- Floor count: 8

Hotel Grim is an apartment building and former hotel in downtown Texarkana, Texas, United States. It was added to the National Register of Historic Places listings in Bowie County, Texas on June 7, 2016.

== History ==
=== Construction ===
Sign on the roof of the hotel

Hotel Grim opened in 1925 and was named after banking, railroad, and timber magnate William Rhoads Grim. It was designed by architects from Little Rock from neighboring Arkansas, and at the time, construction cost 1 million dollars. The hotel had 250 rooms. It contains 103,200 square feet and was the second tallest building in the city when it was built. After 65 years of activity, the hotel closed down in October 1990.

=== Restoration ===
Plans for restoration and renovations started in 2009. In 2014, assessment for the hotel finished. When Texarkana was visited by the Council of Development Finance Agencies in June 2015, A project response team composed of CFDA staff and technical assistance partners provided expert advice and proposed a redevelopment strategy detailed in the report titled Grim Hotel: Roadmap to Redevelopment. The property was added to the National Historic Registry in June 2016.

In July 2016, the Grim Lofts LLC was officially formed by developer Jim Sari. The hotel was also submitted for cleanup funds. In November 2016, the Hotel Grim Lofts project team presented at the Council of Development Finance Agencies National Development Finance Summit in New Orleans, Louisiana during November 2-4th. The session was titled “Hotel Revitalization in the Heartland”. On January 30, 2017, The City of Texarkana, Texas received approval from the U.S. Department of Housing and Urban Development for assistance in the amount of $1,429,000 for the Hotel Grim Lofts Project. The city council approved it on March 13, 2017.

After decades of neglect and unsuccessful restoration campaigns, Hotel Grim was finally converted into apartments by developer Cohen Esrey. In November 2024, the edifice reopened its doors as "Lofts at the Grim". The redevelopment cost around $42.7 million using local, state and federal funds.

=== Current use ===
The revitalized edifice now offers studios and 1 and 2 bedroom apartments, totalling 93 units.

== See also ==
- National Register of Historic Places listings in Bowie County, Texas
