= Bowie County Jail =

Prison building in Boston, Texas

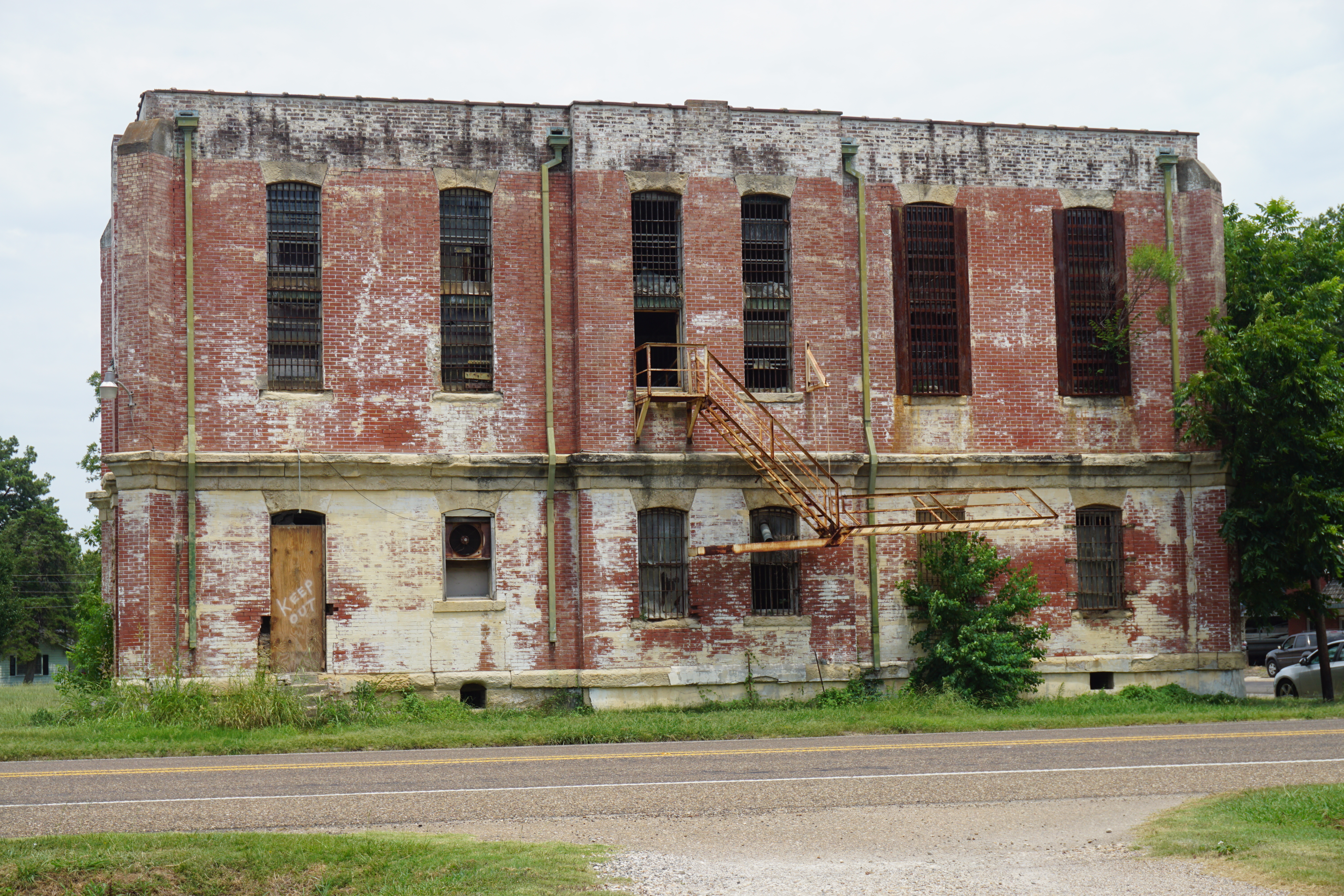
- Bowie County jail in 2018
- Interactive map of Bowie County Jail
- Location: Boston, Texas
- Opened: 1888
- Closed: 1960s

Bowie County Jail is a historic prison located in Boston, Texas.

== Appearance ==
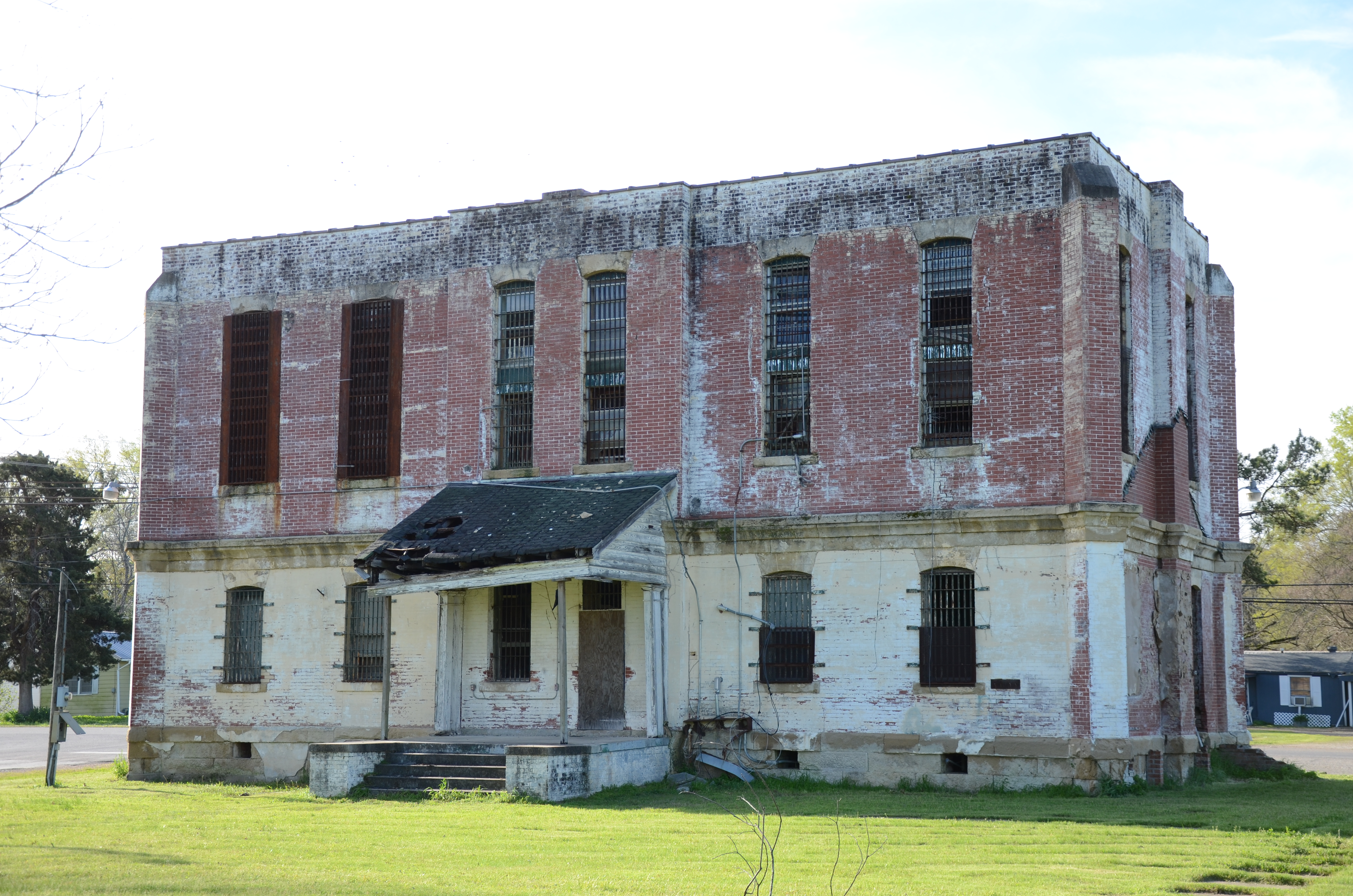
Bowie County Jail during 2016

The Bowie County Jail is composed of two stories of brick and is built on a limestone foundation. The building has a rectangular shape that measures approximately 30 feet by 40 feet. The roof is hipped and features a central cupola and a weathervane. The windows are tall and narrow with arching tops and lintel made of limestone. The jail's main entrance is located on the front facade, and there is a secondary entrance on the rear facade. Inside the jail, there are two sections separated by a central corridor that runs the length of the building.

On the west side of the building, there is a large room where the jail cells can be found. Iron bars are utilized in the cells, which are arranged in two rows and have a central aisle located between them. The cells are roughly 6 feet wide by 8 feet long and include a bunk bed, toilet, and sink. The cells were poorly ventilated and often overcrowded, with as many as three or four prisoners housed in each cell.

In the east side of the building, the sheriff's office, kitchen, and jailer's living quarters can be found.

== History ==
The building was originally built in 1888 and closed down in the 1960s when a new prison was built. For a short amount of time, the building was used as a storage facility, but it was eventually abandoned. In the 1990s, The Bowie County Jail was restored in by the Bowie County Jail Restoration Committee, formed in 1996. The organization raised funds to purchase the building and to restore it to its original condition. The restoration was completed in 1998. The building is now a museum.

Bowie County Jail was added to the National Register of Historic Places listings on November 16, 1977, and is recognized as a State Antiquities Landmark.

== See also ==
- National Register of Historic Places listings in Bowie County, Texas
