= The Town That Dreaded Sundown (2014 film) =

- Theatrical release poster
- Directed by: Alfonso Gomez-Rejon
- Written by: Roberto Aguirre-Sacasa
- Based on: The Town That Dreaded Sundown by Earl E. Smith
- Produced by: Jason Blum; Ryan Murphy
- Starring: Addison Timlin; Veronica Cartwright; Gary Cole; Edward Herrmann; Joshua Leonard; Denis O'Hare; Anthony Anderson
- Cinematography: Michael Goi
- Edited by: Joe Leonard
- Music by: Ludwig Göransson
- Production companies: Blumhouse Productions; Ryan Murphy Productions
- Distributed by: Orion Pictures
- Release date: October 16, 2014
- Running time: 86 minutes
- Country: United States
- Language: English
- Box office: $120,459

The Town That Dreaded Sundown is a 2014 American slasher film directed by Alfonso Gomez-Rejon and written by Roberto Aguirre-Sacasa. The film serves as a metafictional sequel to the 1976 film of the same name. It stars Addison Timlin, Travis Tope, Spencer Treat Clark, Veronica Cartwright and Gary Cole and was one of the last films of Ed Lauter and Edward Herrmann before their deaths in October 2013 and December 2014, respectively.

The project was initially planned as remake of the 1976 film. However, it was conceived as a sequel, with several elements and references from the original.

The Town That Dreaded Sundown was released in the United States on October 16, 2014, by Orion Pictures. The film received generally positive reviews from critics.

== Plot ==
A drive-in theater in the city of Texarkana, Arkansas hosts the Halloween annual showing of The Town That Dreaded Sundown, the 1976 film based on the Phantom Killer responsible for several murders in Texarkana in 1946. After lovers Corey Holland and Jami Lerner leave the theater, the Phantom kills Corey and tells Jami "This is for Mary. Make them remember."

Two days before Thanksgiving, Kendra Collins-Thompson and her boyfriend Daniel Torrens are killed by the Phantom while having sex at a motel. The Phantom calls Jami with Corey's phone, urging her to "make them remember." Jami informs her police escort, Deputy Foster, and research the killings with the help of former classmate Nick Strain. Texas Ranger Lone Wolf Morales takes over the investigation.

Jami receives an email supposedly from the Phantom and takes it to the police. Nick asks Jami to a vigil for the Phantom victims. There, a teenager dressed up as the Phantom is killed, causing the townspeople to believe the murderer is dead. At a junkyard, band members Johnny and Roy hook up and are attacked by the Phantom, who fatally shoots Johnny and stabs Roy.

Morales and Deputy Tillman visit Reverend Cartwright. They discovered that he sent Jami the email, but do not believe he is the Phantom. Jami learns that Charles B. Pierce's son is still alive and lives in Texarkana. On Christmas Eve, Tillman and his date are killed by the Phantom. Jami and Nick visit Charles Pierce Jr. and learn about Hank McCreedy, a sixth victim of the original Phantom whose story was forgotten. Pierce believes the new Phantom is McCreedy's grandson, because the family was angered that McCreedy's death was not remembered. McCreedy had a wife named Mary.

Lillian, Jami's grandmother, finds out that Jami was accepted into a college in California and decides to move there so Jami can go to school. Jami tells Nick she is leaving and they have sex. Nick is later killed by the Phantom.

While leaving town, Jami pulls into a gas station. There, the Phantom starts firing from a window, killing Lillian and several others. Jami runs into the old Union train station and finds Nick's body. She is shot down by arrows and confronted by two Phantom Killers. One is Deputy Foster and the other is Corey, who faked his death. Foster is McCreedy's grandson. Corey explains he felt suffocated with his life path and wanted to be part of something great. He tries to convince Jami they are the same: that Texarkana trapped them in roles they hated. He brags about how everyone will know what he did, but is killed by Foster who plans to kill Jami and blame the killings on her and Corey. Jami finds the gun and shoots Foster but his body is never found.

Jami leaves Texarkana and moves on with her life. In the end, the Phantom's shadow is seen stalking her.

== Cast ==
- Addison Timlin as Jami Lerner
- Travis Tope as Nick Strain
- Veronica Cartwright as Grandma Lillian Lerner
- Gary Cole as Chief Deputy Hank Tillman
- Joshua Leonard as Deputy Clayborn Foster
- Edward Herrmann as Reverend Joe Cartwright
- Anthony Anderson as Ranger "Lone Wolf" Morales
- Ed Lauter as Sheriff Underwood
- Arabella Field as Dr. Kelly
- Denis O'Hare as Charles Pierce Jr.
- Spencer Treat Clark as Corey Holland
- Morganna Bridgers as Kendra Collins
- Wes Chatham as Corporal Danny Torrens
- Jaren Mitchell as Johnny
- Kurt Krause as Roy
- Lance E. Nichols as Arkansas Mayor Holdridge
- Lanee Landry as Ardele
- Colby Boothman as Paul Mason
- Bill Stinchcomb as Mr. Holland
- Charles B. Pierce, Jr. as Man In Diner

== Production ==
When Jason Blum was asked in an interview why he wanted to remake the original film, he responded:

Ryan Murphy found the movie, brought it to me and said, "I wanna do it". I didn't find it. He brought it to me. I think he is an amazing, creative force, especially with horror. I think he thinks about horror in a really unique way. So, he pitched it to me and I really wanted to work with him. I didn't know the [original] movie. That's what got me interested in it. I have had a really good working relationship with him. And the whole point of why my business exists and why I'm such a fanatic about making movies inexpensively is that you get to do different stuff. We just wanted to try it. That's the fun thing. When you don't have a $20 million horror film, which is a typical horror movie studio budget, or a $180 million tent-pole budget, looming down at you, you can try new stuff. It may work or it may not work, but the fun is that we can try. It's a really weird movie to remake, and I really like doing weird things.

=== Filming ===
"The museum is where their base of operations is, and then we're supplying the cars that are coming into the scenes where they shoot the movie. They want '60s- and '70s- era cars. As I understand the movie, it's going to be kind of like a flashback kind of thing."
— Jeral Willard, Four States Auto Museum

Though the film is about Texarkana, most of the film was shot in Shreveport, Louisiana in mid-May 2013 for a six-week shoot. Some of its locals were recruited as extras. Three of those days were filmed in Texarkana. Downtown State Line Avenue was decorated with out-of-season Christmas decorations on June 12. Filming in Texarkana began Monday, June 17 and ended in the early morning of June 20. The crew then finished filming in Shreveport.

== Release ==
The Town That Dreaded Sundown had its first screening at the 10th Fantastic Fest in Austin, Texas on September 18–25, 2014, which director Gomez-Rejon attended, and then later at Beyond Fest in Los Angeles, California on October 4, 2014. Its international debut was at the BFI London Film Festival on October 14, 2014. Both Deadline Hollywood and Bloody Disgusting indicated that the film would be released by Orion Pictures, a long-dormant subsidiary of Metro-Goldwyn-Mayer, in select theaters on October 16, 2014. The film was then released digitally on Video on Demand through Blumhouse Productions' new BH Tilt, a new label which releases films via multi-platform.

== Reception ==
On Rotten Tomatoes, the film received a 66% approval rating based on 29 reviews with an average rating of 6/10. The site's critical consensus reads: "It may occasionally mistake more gore for genuine terror, but The Town That Dreaded Sundown is just stylish and clever enough to justify this second stab at the source material." On Metacritic, which assigns a weighted average score out of 100 to reviews from mainstream critics, the film received an average score of 47 based on five reviews.

Variety found the film lacking and said "this tediously metatextual exercise conjures few inspired jolts of its own." Chris Tilly of IGN said the film was "ultimately, not very good." Bloody Disgusting praised the film's visuals but said "It’s unfortunate that the script can’t reach the same bar—particularly when it comes to the tired twist ending, which seems to exist simply because the filmmakers assumed audiences would expect it."

Empire Online gave the film three stars and called it "Smart, fun, mid-list horror with Scream overtones." Fangoria gave the film three out of four skulls and said, "the plot somewhat falls apart in the third act... But despite this disappointing final blow, The Town That Dreaded Sundown is still well worth a visit."

Jonathan Romney of The Guardian gave the film three stars and called it "a southern-fried Scream" and said it "proves that a brazen lack of originality doesn’t preclude inventiveness and brio." However, Benjamin Lee also writing for The Guardian gave it two stars and called it "cookie-cutter carnage."

== Home media ==
Image Entertainment acquired the U.S. home video distribution rights and released the film on DVD and Blu-ray exclusively at Best Buy on July 7, 2015.
