= Boston, Texas =

Boston
- County seat & unincorporated community
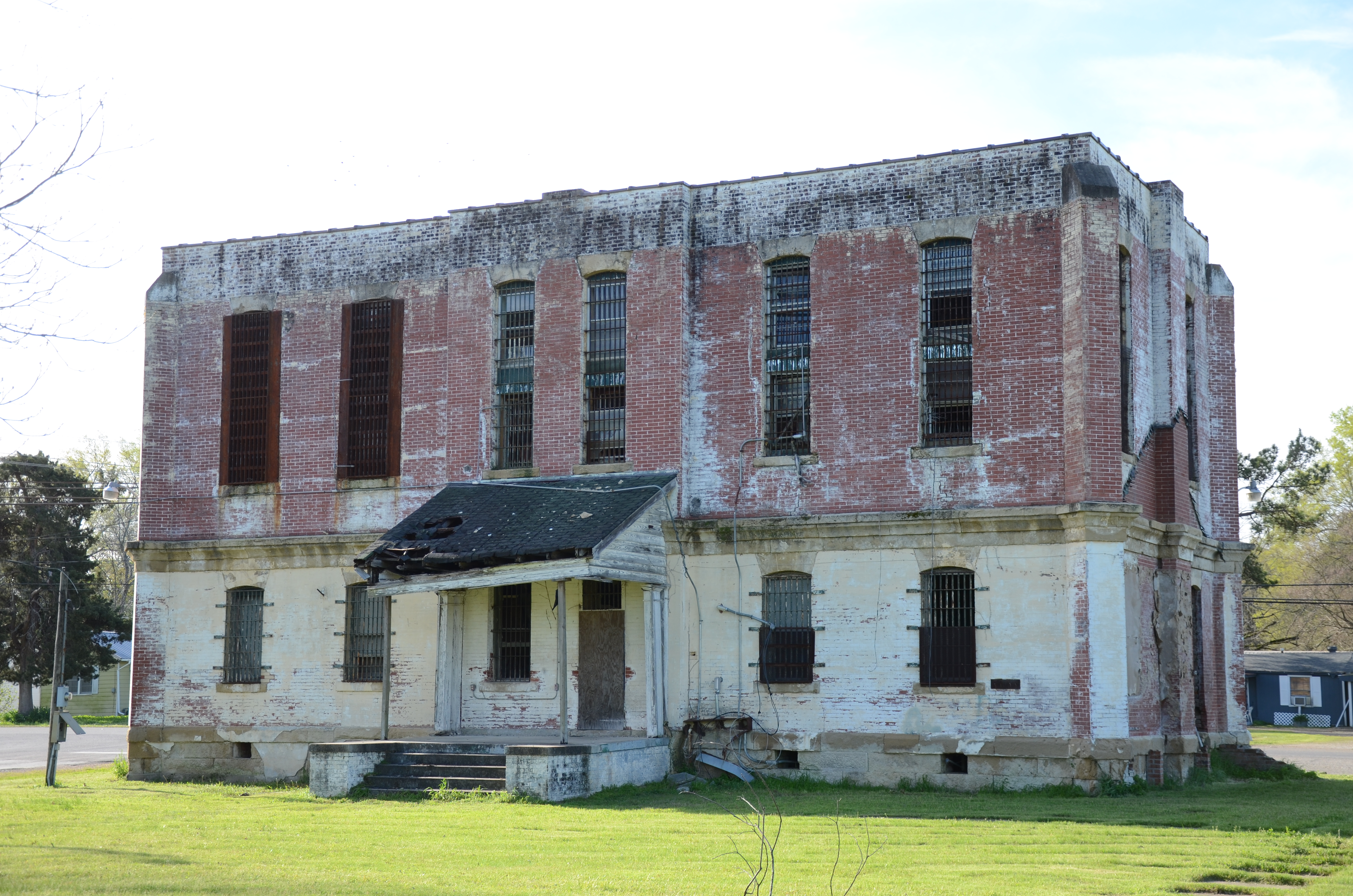
- Bowie County Jail in Boston
- Nickname: City of Boston, Texas
- Location in Texas Location in the United States
- Coordinates: 33°26′29″N 94°25′11″W
- Country: United States
- State: Texas
- County: Bowie
- Established: 1890
- Elevation: 364 ft (111 m)

Population (2000)
  - Total: 200
- Time zone: UTC-6 (Central (CST))
  - Summer (DST): UTC-5 (CDT)
- ZIP code: 75570
- Area code(s): 430 & 903
- GNIS feature ID: 1352714

Boston is an unincorporated community in and the county seat of Bowie County, Texas, United States. According to the Handbook of Texas, the community had a population of 200 in 2000. It is part of the Texarkana metropolitan area.

== History ==
In the mid-1880s, as the population of Old Boston declined, citizens of Texarkana successfully moved the county seat to their city in the extreme east of the county. Within five years, citizens of central and western Bowie County successfully proposed moving the county seat closer to the geographic center of the county. The new community began in 1890 with the construction of the County Courthouse, one mile south of New Boston and three miles north of the original Boston. The county seat was required to have a post office. After the first three proposed names, Center, Hood, and Glass were rejected as already in use, Boston's post office (including its name) was relocated to the new county seat, while the original was relabeled "Old Boston". In the 1980s, a new courthouse was built in New Boston, but Boston remained the county seat. Its population was recorded at 200 in 2000. Its population was also recorded as 175 from 1896 through the early 1990s. It had only two operating businesses in 1982.

The Bowie County jail in the community is listed on the National Register of Historic Places.

== Geography ==
Boston is located off U.S. Highway 82 and the Missouri Pacific Railroad, 22 mi (35 km) west of Texarkana in central Bowie County.

== Education ==
Boston is served by the New Boston Independent School District.

== Notable people ==
- William Lee Estes, United States federal judge, was born in Boston.
- Jeff D. Leach, businessman and microbiome researcher, was born in Boston.
- Howell Washington Runnels Sr. Politician; was a store clerk in Boston.
