= Texarkana metropolitan area =

Texarkana, United States
- Metropolitan statistical area
- Texarkana, TX–AR MSA
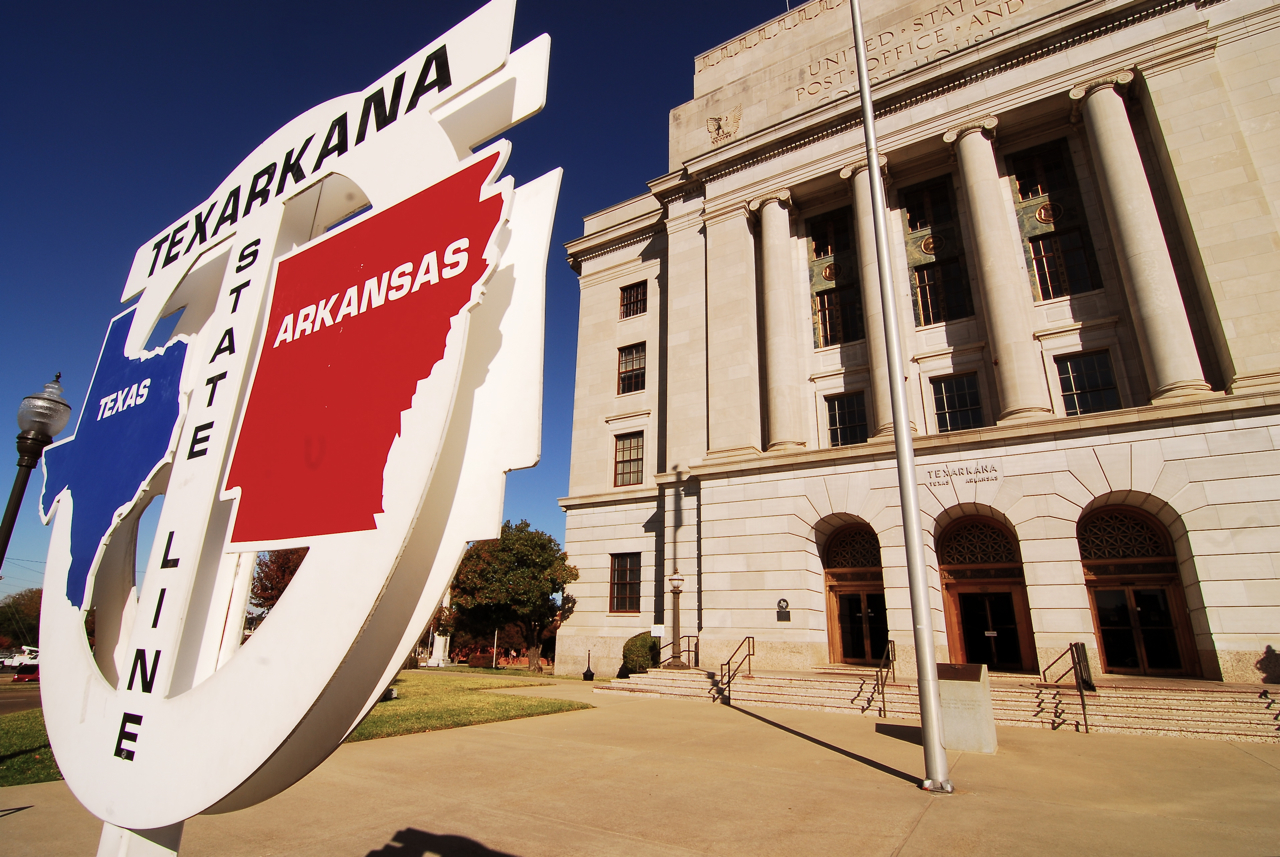
- Texarkana Post Office, located in two states.
- Nicknames: TXK, TK, T-Town, The Trench.
- Motto: Twice as Nice
Interactive Map of Texarkana, TX–AR MSA
Texarkana, Texas
Texarkana, Arkansas
Texarkana, TX–AR MSA
- Coordinates: 33°26′14″N 94°4′3″W
- Country: United States
- State: Texas; Arkansas
- County: Miller County, AR; Bowie County, TX

Government
  - AR Mayor: Allen L. Brown
  - TX Mayor: Rob Bruggeman.
- Elevation: 299 ft (91 m)

Population (2020)
  - Total: 148,838
- Time zone: UTC-6 (CST)
  - Summer (DST): UTC-5 (CDT)
- ZIP codes: (AR) 71854 (TX) 75500-75599
- Area codes: (AR) 870 (TX) 430 & 903
- FIPS code: 48-72368
- GNIS feature ID: 1369752
- Website: Texarkana MSA

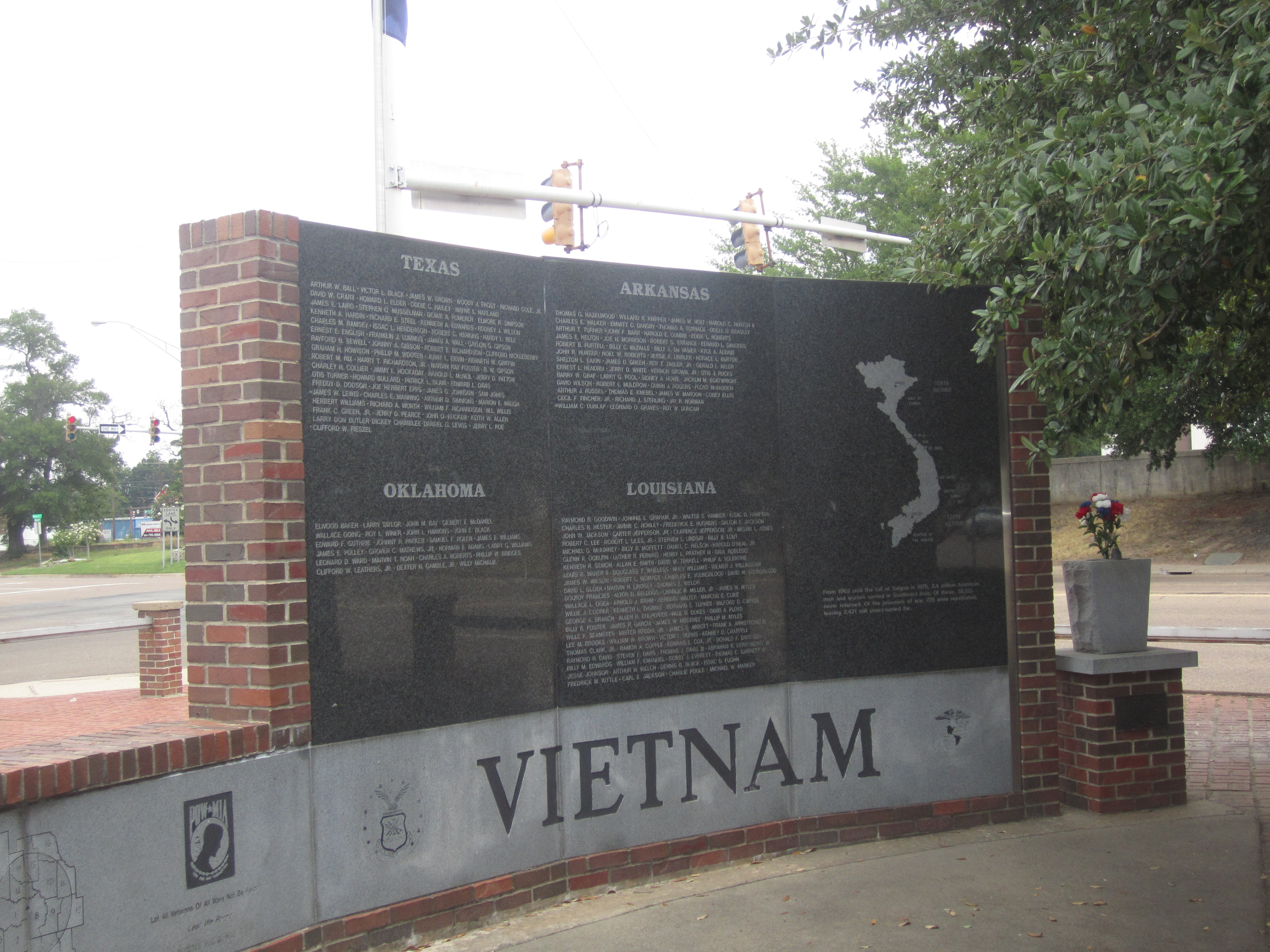
Vietnam Memorial in Texarkana honors those killed from Arkansas, Louisiana, Oklahoma, and Texas.

The Texarkana metropolitan statistical area (MSA), as defined by the United States Office of Management and Budget, is a two-county region anchored by the twin cities of Texarkana, Texas (population 37,333) and Texarkana, Arkansas (population 30,259), and encompassing surrounding communities in Bowie County, Texas, and Miller County, Arkansas. As of the 2016 census, the MSA had a population of 150,098. Texarkana is a subset of the broader Ark-La-Tex region.

== History ==
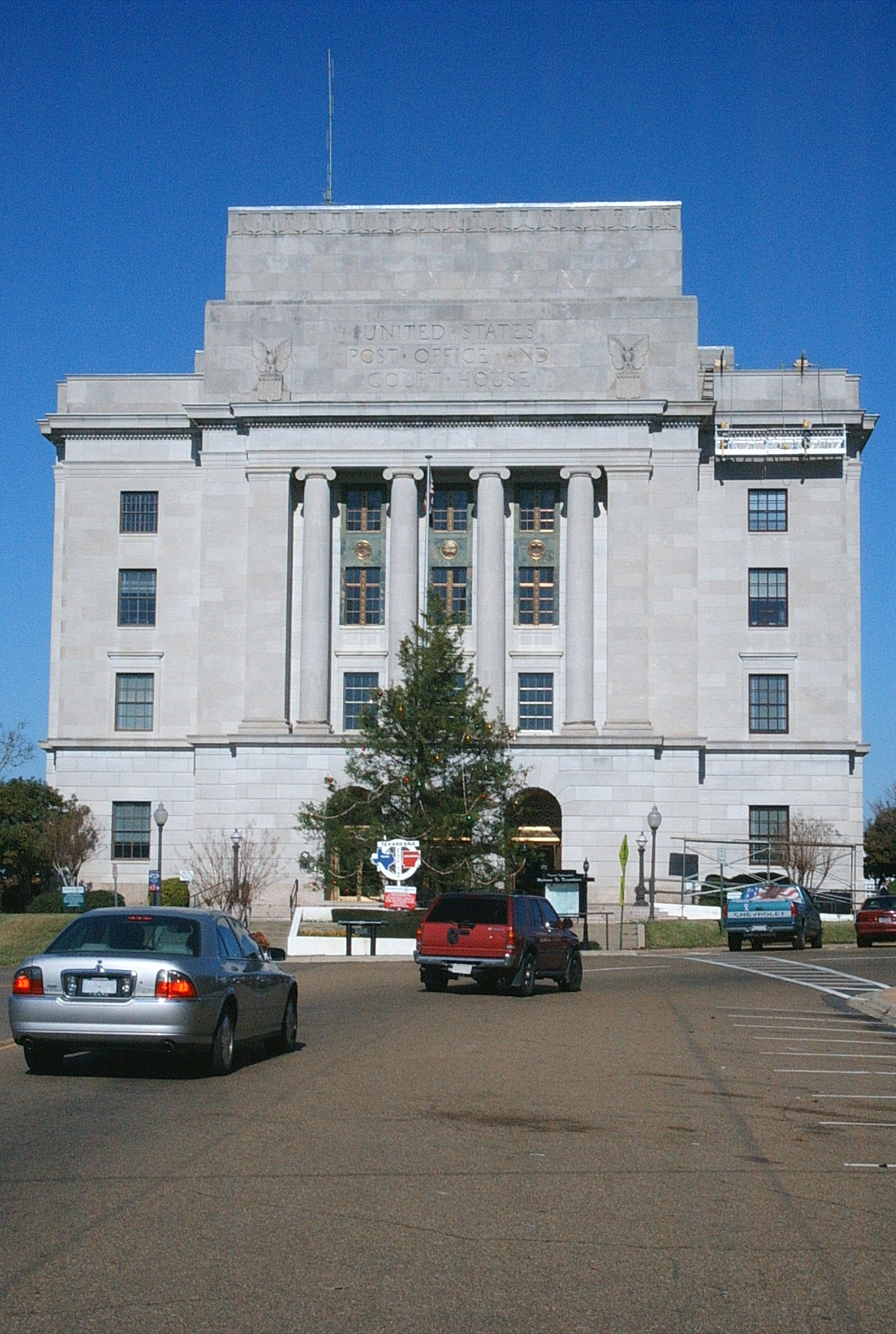
State Line Avenue

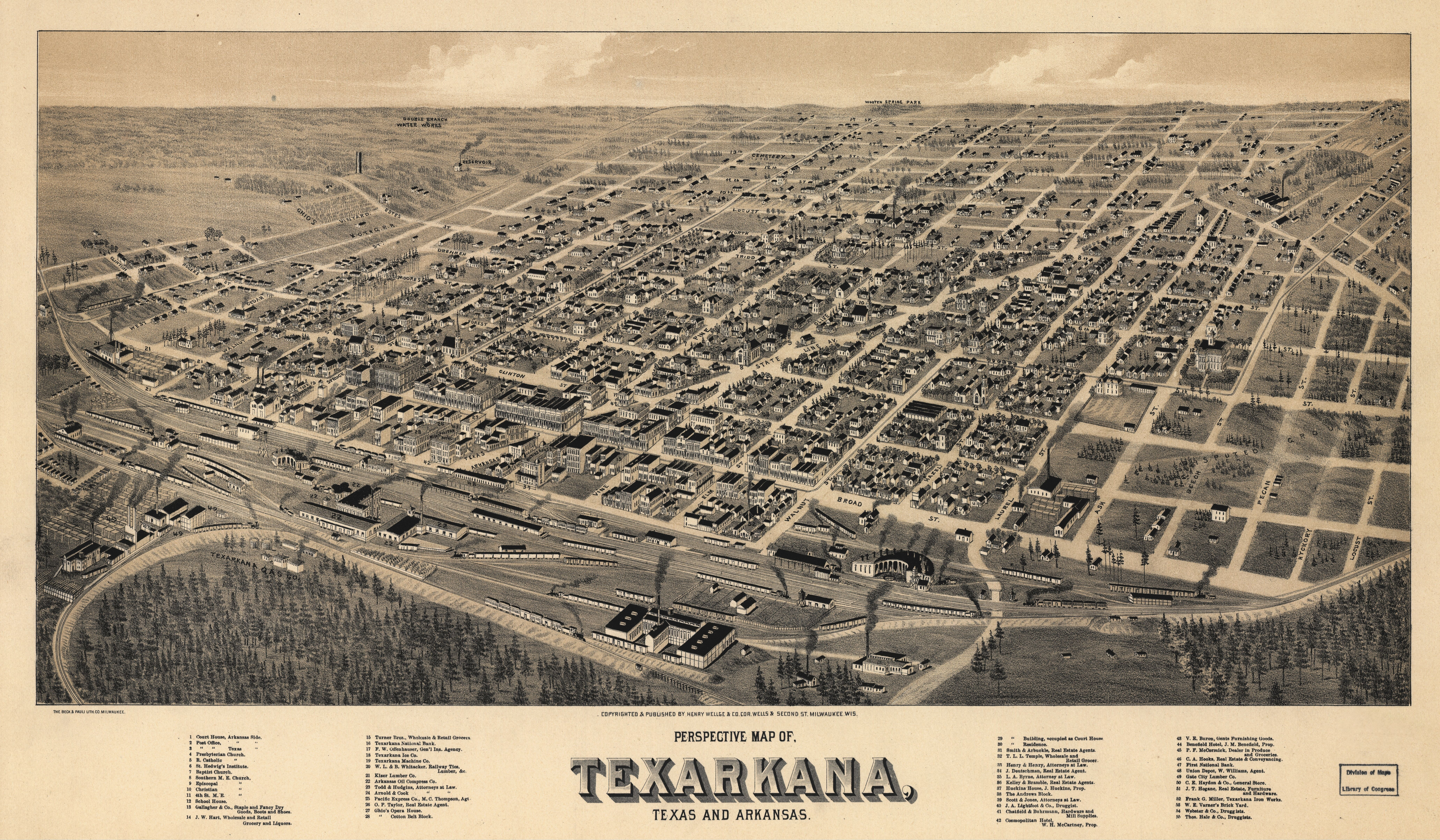
Map of the city in 1888

=== Texarkana ===
Texarkana was founded in 1873 on the junction of two railroads. The name is a portmanteau of Texas, Arkansas, and nearby Louisiana. One tradition tells of a Red River steamboat named The Texarkana, c. 1860. Another story mentions a storekeeper named Swindle in Red Land, Louisiana who concocted a drink called "Texarkana Bitters". A third account states that Col. Gus Knobel, a railroad surveyor, coined the name. Local lore suggests that, before Texas's annexation by the US, lawlessness ruled in the area that at times was claimed by various nations.

In 1876, Texarkana, Texas, was granted a charter under an act of the Texas legislature, and a Texarkana, Texas, post office operated from 1886 to 1892. Later, Congressman Morris Sheppard (D-TX) secured a postal order officially changing the name to "Texarkana, Arkansas-Texas".

=== Texarkana metropolitan area ===
The Texarkana metropolitan area was first defined in 1960. Then known as the Texarkana, TX–Texarkana, AR Standard Metropolitan Statistical Area, it consisted of Bowie County, Texas, and Miller County, Arkansas. In 1963, the area was renamed the Texarkana, TX–AR Standard Metropolitan Statistical Area, only to return to its original name in 1971.

Little River County, Arkansas, was added to the SMSA in 1973. In 1983, the official name was shortened to the Texarkana, TX–Texarkana, AR Metropolitan Statistical Area, which is still in use. That same year, Little River County was removed from the MSA. The two-county MSA had a population of 137,486 in 2000.

== Demographics ==
As of the census of 2000, there were 137,486 people, 72,695 households, and 55,524 families residing within the MSA. The racial makeup of the MSA was 66.0% White, 25.0% African American, 0.6% Native American, 0.4% Asian, <0.1% Pacific Islander, 0.9% from other races, and 1.2% from two or more races. Hispanic or Latino of any race were 3.6% of the population.

The median income for a household in the MSA was $31,976, and the median income for a family was $38,887. Males had a median income of $32,482 versus $21,408 for females. The per capita income for the MSA was $16,901.

== Economy ==
Texarkana began as a railroad and lumber center, and developed in the 20th century as a regional agricultural processing, retail, wholesale, and service center. Red River Army Depot and Lone Star Army Ammunition Plant were the largest regional employers from the 1940s through the 1970s. Paper mills near Ashdown and Atlanta, as well as other industrial facilities, brought new jobs to the area in the 1970s. Today the Texarkana area is a diversified economy whose pattern of employment categorized by industry is very similar to the entire state of Arkansas.

Top employers in Texarkana
Employer	Local employees
Red River Army Depot & Tenants	7,200
Christus St. Michael Health System	1,883
Cooper Tire & Rubber	1,700
Domtar	1,300
Texarkana (TX) Independent School District	1,100
Walmart	967
International Paper	960
Texarkana (AR) School District	835
Wadley Regional Medical Center	778
Southern Refrigerated Transport	750

== Geography ==
Texarkana consists of two separate municipal designations:

- Texarkana, Arkansas, the county seat of Miller County, Arkansas
- Texarkana, Texas, located in Bowie County, Texas

State Line Avenue follows the Texas-Arkansas state line throughout much of Texarkana. The two "sides" of Texarkana are separate only from a political standpoint. Thousands of locals actually live in one state and work in the other.

Owing to its divided political nature, Texarkana has two mayors and two sets of city officials; however, the two sides share a federal building, courthouse, jail, post office, labor office, chamber of commerce, water utility, and several other offices.

== Transportation ==
Texarkana is located at the intersection of Interstate 30 and Interstate 49. It is situated approximately halfway between Dallas, Texas, and Little Rock, Arkansas.

=== Air service ===
Texarkana Regional Airport is located inside the northeastern city limits on the Arkansas side and is included in the National Plan of Integrated Airport Systems for 2011–2015, which categorized it as a primary commercial service airport.

The airport covers an area of 964 acres (390 ha) at an elevation of 390 feet (119 m) above mean sea level and it has two runways with asphalt surfaces:

- Runway 4/22 is 6,601 by 144 feet (2,012 x 44 m)
- Runway 13/31 is 5,200 by 100 feet (1,585 x 30 m)

=== Major highways ===
Major routes in Texarkana include:

- I-30
- I-49
- I-369
- US 59
- US 67
- US 71
- US 82

=== Railways ===
Rail service in Texarkana is provided by:

- Amtrak's Texas Eagle, which stops at Texarkana Union Station
- Kansas City Southern Railway
- Texas Northeastern Railroad
- Union Pacific Railroad

== Culture and education ==
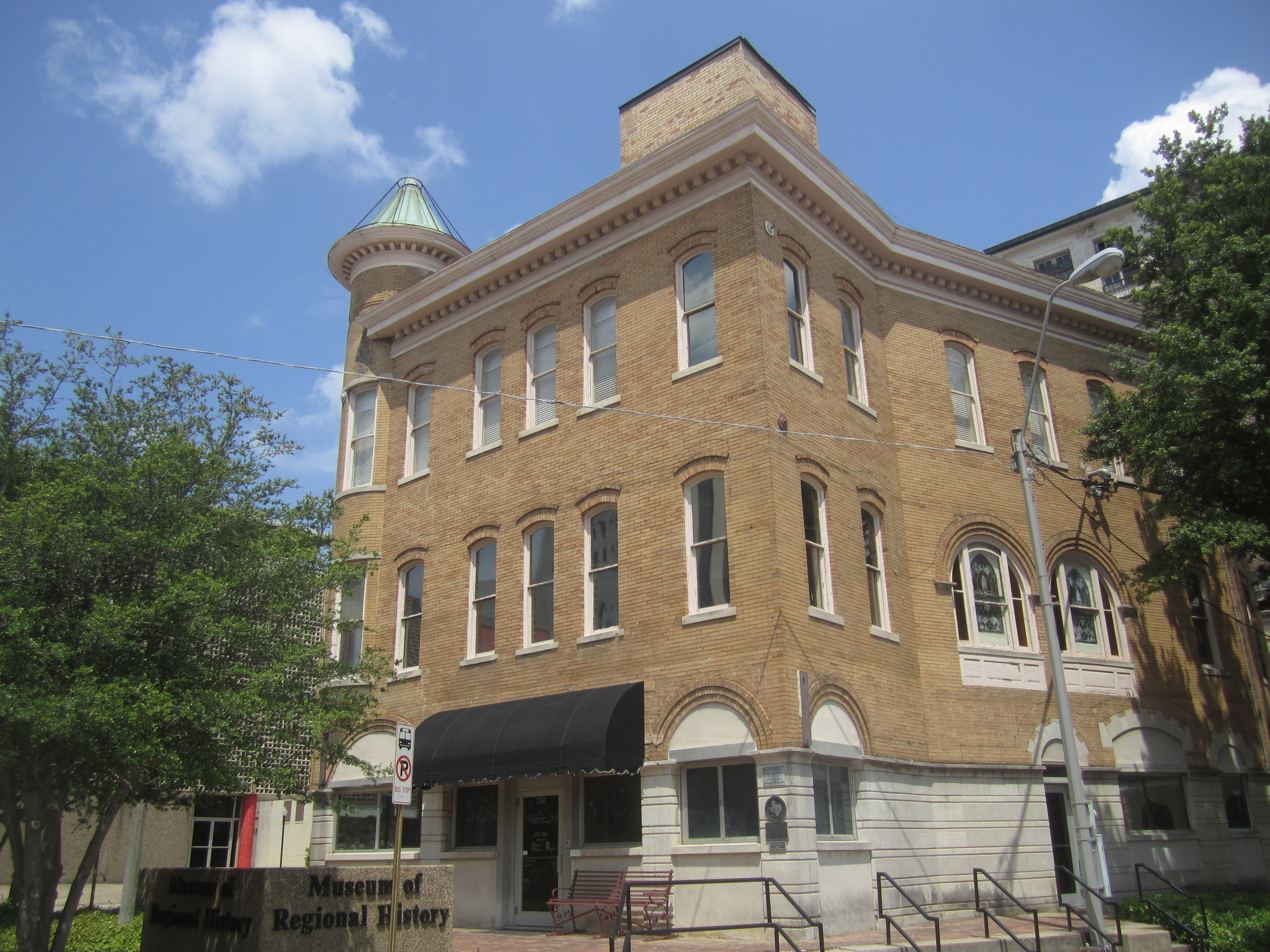
Museum of Regional History in downtown Texarkana

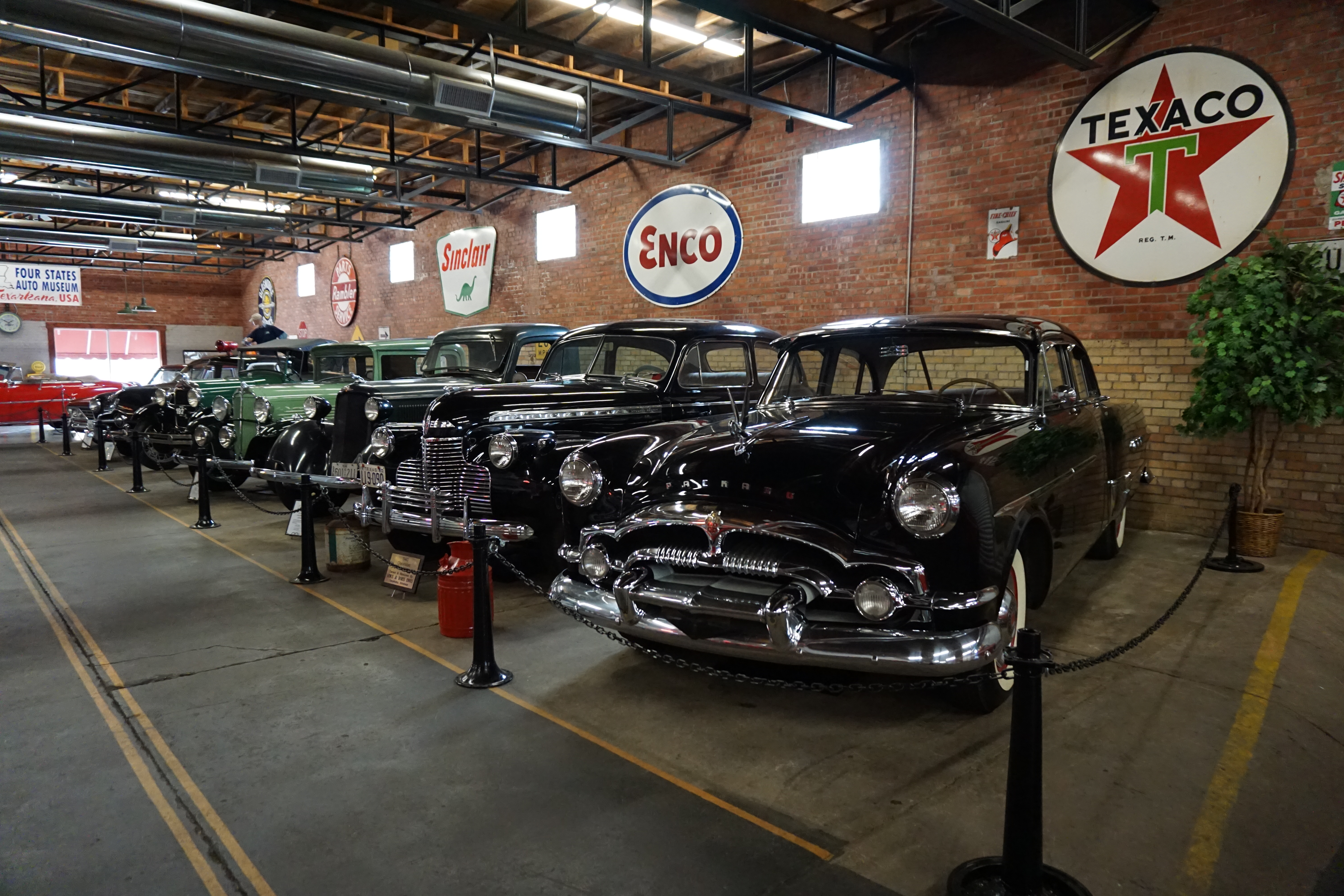
Four States Auto Museum in downtown Texarkana

Notable historical buildings in Texarkana include the United States Post Office and Courthouse, the Ace of Clubs House, the Perot Theater, Museum of Regional History, the Four States Auto Museum, TRAHC Regional Arts Center, and the Arkansas Municipal Auditorium.

The Texarkana Post Office is the second-most photographed post office in the United States, as it straddles the state line that separates Arkansas and Texas. The Ace of Clubs House is a house shaped like a club on a playing card and supposedly inspired by a winning poker hand. The Perot Theater (Originally the Saenger Theater - Texarkana) is a 1924 theater renamed after Texarkana native business magnate and politician Ross Perot. Texarkana Regional Arts and Humanities Council has transformed the 1909 US Courthouse into their offices as well as gallery space. Famous musicians such as Johnny Cash and Elvis Presley performed at the Arkansas Municipal Auditorium.

As of 2020, Texarkana officials have been promoting the arts and the improvement of the downtown area by encouraging the painting of murals across Downtown Texarkana. At least 13 murals have been painted since the initiative began.

The Texarkana Symphony Orchestra was established in 2005, providing the community with several professional concerts of classical music every year. In 2007, the Texarkana Youth Symphony Orchestra was established, presenting spring and winter concerts. Both perform in the Perot Theater.

Texarkana College, a community college whose origins date to 1927, enrolls more than four thousand annually. In 1971, East Texas State University began offering classes at the campus, this institution later became Texas A&M University–Texarkana.

Texas A&M University-Texarkana has constructed a large campus at Bringle Lake. Historically an institution for upperclassmen and graduate students, in 2010, TAMU-T began accepting freshmen and sophomores. In 2011 the first residence hall, Bringle Lake Village, opened on campus.

A branch of the University of Arkansas Hope-Texarkana (UAHT), based in Hope, Arkansas, opened in Texarkana in 2012, and in 2015 UALR Texarkana, a branch of the University of Arkansas at Little Rock, began offering bachelor's-degree programs on the Texarkana campus of UAHT. University of Arkansas for Medical Sciences (UAMS) offers a residency program in Texarkana serving Wadley Regional Medical Center, Christus Saint Michael Hospital, as well as the UAMS clinics in Texarkana.

== Local lore ==
=== Phantom Killer ===
In 1946, Texarkana was in fear of an unidentified serial killer who attacked eight people, five of whom were murdered. The term "serial killer" did not yet exist, but the town knew they were dealing with an unknown killer who was attacking couples on "lovers' lanes". The local paper dubbed him "The Phantom Killer". The attacks became known as the "Texarkana Moonlight Murders" by the media. Since the killer was never identified or apprehended, their description came from the only two survivors. They described their attacker as six foot tall with a white mask over his head and with holes cut out for his eyes and mouth. He had a pistol and a flashlight. They disagreed on his race. One survivor thought he was a light-skinned African American while the other thought he was a dark-tanned Caucasian man.

The attacks inspired the 1976 film The Town That Dreaded Sundown and its 2014 sequel. The original film was written and directed by Charles B. Pierce, a former Texarkanan who played the comedic role as officer A.C. Benson, a clumsy patrolman. The movie also starred Ben Johnson, Andrew Prine and Dawn Wells. Most of the facts of the original case were fictionalized which created much of the myth and lore for several years. Many of the rumors are still believed and spread by locals. One of the more prominent rumors is that blood-stained clothing hidden by The Phantom was found in a school attic many years after the crime spree. This was, however, only a rumor.

Over the years the case files from both police departments went missing. All official files, photographs, evidence and notes are now lost. Some locals believe that the Phantom Killer died long ago, while some think he may still be alive. Some claim that he was a member of the local upper class aristocracy, which collaborated to keep his identity quiet to avoid scandal. The case is still open.

=== Fouke Monster ===
The swampy terrain of Boggy Creek, near Fouke, Arkansas, a small Miller County town southeast of Texarkana, is the reputed home of an anthropoid cryptid similar in appearance and behavior to the Pacific Northwest's Bigfoot or Sasquatch, and to the Skunk Ape of Florida legend. A film dramatizing these stories, entitled The Legend of Boggy Creek, was released in 1972. Two sequels, Return to Boggy Creek (1977) and The Barbaric Beast of Boggy Creek, Part II (1985) (a.k.a. Boggy Creek II: And the Legend Continues; the "official" sequel made by the original film's director, Charles B. Pierce) followed with very little commercial success (although The Barbaric Beast of Boggy Creek, Part II was featured in the 10th season of Mystery Science Theater 3000). Locals commonly refer to this creature as the "Fouke Monster" and a number of persons have reported seeing the creature in various locations in and around Fouke. Most of the reported sightings have occurred during the hours of darkness, which has contributed to the lack of adequate descriptions of the creature itself. The Fouke Monster's credibility is generally doubted.

== Notable people from the Texarkana MSA ==
=== Sports ===
==== Football ====
- Mike Cherry, Jr., professional NFL football player, quarterback for the New York Giants
- Ike Forte, professional NFL football player, running back for the New England Patriots, Washington Redskins, and New York Giants
- LaMichael James, professional NFL football player, running back for the San Francisco 49ers and Miami Dolphins
- Brandon Jones, professional NFL football player, wide receiver for the Tennessee Titans, San Francisco 49ers, and the Seattle Seahawks
- Rod Smith, professional NFL football player, wide receiver for the Denver Broncos
- Jeremiah Trotter, professional NFL football player, linebacker for the Philadelphia Eagles, Washington Redskins, and Tampa Bay Buccaneers
- Nathan Vasher, cornerback for the Chicago Bears and Detroit Lions
- Eric Warfield, cornerback for the Kansas City Chiefs

==== Baseball ====
- Eddie Mathews, professional MLB baseball player, third baseman for the Atlanta Braves, Houston Astros, and Detroit Tigers, National. Baseball Hall of Fame inductee
- Will Middlebrooks, professional MLB baseball player, third baseman for the Boston Red Sox, San Diego Padres, Milwaukee Brewers, and Texas Rangers
- Craig Monroe, professional MLB baseball player and sportscaster, outfielder for the Texas Rangers, Detroit Tigers, Chicago Cubs, and Pittsburgh Pirates
- Bob Moose, professional MLB baseball player, pitcher for the Pittsburgh Pirates
- Dustin Moseley, professional MLB baseball player, pitcher for the Los Angeles Angels of Anaheim, New York Yankees, and San Diego Padres
- Drew Stubbs, professional MLB baseball player, outfielder for the Cincinnati Reds, Cleveland Indians, Colorado Rockies, Atlanta Braves, Texas Rangers, Baltimore Orioles, and San Francisco Giants
- Michael Wacha, professional MLB baseball player, pitcher for the St. Louis Cardinals, New York Mets, Tampa Bay Rays, Boston Red Sox, and currently the San Diego Padres

==== Golf ====
- Miller Barber, professional golfer, notable success during the PGA Tour and Champions Tour
- Byron Nelson, professional golfer, dubbed "Lord Byron," widely regarded as one of the greatest golfers of all time, winner of two Masters Tournaments, two PGA Championships, and one U.S. Open
- Bill Rogers, professional golfer, winner of the 1981 British Open

==== Racing ====
- Parnelli Jones, professional race car driver, notable success during the Indianapolis 500 and Baja 1000 races

=== Film and theater ===
- Dan Blocker, television/movie actor, most notable on Bonanza, born in nearby DeKalb, Texas
- Corinne Griffith, silent film star, dubbed the "Orchid Lady of the Screens," most notable for The Divine Lady (1929)
- Joshua Logan, Broadway actor and film director, writer, and lyricist, co-wrote South Pacific
- Charles B. Pierce, movie director and producer, best known for The Legend of Boggy Creek (1973) and The Town that Dreaded Sundown
- Molly Quinn, television actress, best known for her roles in ABC's Castle and Nickelodeon's Winx Club
- Cat Thomas, stage and anime voice actress

=== Music ===
- David Crowder, contemporary Christian musician
- Scott Joplin, ragtime composer and pianist, dubbed the "King of Ragtime"
- Jeff Keith, lead vocalist for Tesla
- Conlon Nancarrow, composer
- Otis Williams, singer, songwriter, and record producer from The Temptations
- Pilotdrift, indie band
- Pocket Full of Rocks, Christian rock band

=== Science ===
- Taylor Wilson, nuclear scientist

=== Politics ===
- Mike Huckabee, politician, former Governor of Arkansas
- Ross Perot, politician, entrepreneur, and U.S. presidential candidate
- Morris Sheppard, US Senator from Texas "Father of National Prohibition"
- Frank D. White, former Governor of Arkansas

== Media and popular culture ==
=== Books ===
- Historic Texarkana by Beverly J. Rowe
- Images of Texarkana: A Visual History (1873–1990) by Les Minor
- A Canticle for Leibowitz by Walter M. Miller, Jr.

=== TV shows ===
- The Horrifying Texarkana Phantom Killer, episode 5 of season 5 of BuzzFeed Unsolved: True Crime, is an episode discussing the Texarkana Moonlight Murders.
- Kitchen Staff, a Saturday Night Live skit.
- The Texas Bucket List, episode 12 of season 17, features local restaurant Naaman's BBQ.
- Virginia Hyatt, episode 18 of season 28 of Snapped, discusses the Patti Wheelington murder that happened in Texarkana, Arkansas.

=== Movies ===
- 2 Fast 2 Furious depicts Paul Walker's character driving by a highway sign reading "Texarkana" in his Nissan Skyline R34.
- American Psycho depicts a restaurant called "Texarkana" where the serial killer protagonist, Patrick Bateman, takes one of his victims.
- The Legend of Boggy Creek franchise depicts the Fouke Monster and mentions Texarkana, and includes the following films:
  - The Legend of Boggy Creek
  - Return to Boggy Creek, an unauthorized sequel.
  - Boggy Creek II: And the Legend Continues
- Norwood depicts the protagonist's hometown of Ralph, Texas as being outside Texarkana.
- One False Move depicts a trio of drug dealers passing through Texarkana on their way to Houston to sell drugs.
- A Perfect World depicts Kevin Costner's character lying to another character about having driven all the way from Texarkana.
- The Texarkana Moonlight Murders have inspired many films, including:
  - Killer Legends, which is a documentary film that discusses the Texarkana Moonlight Murders as being important to the foundation of the Hookman urban legend.
  - The Town That Dreaded Sundown (1976), which is a fictional depiction of the Texarkana Moonlight Murders, regarded as one of the first slasher films.
  - The Town That Dreaded Sundown (2014), which depicts a return of the Phantom Killer in Texarkana.
  - Seven Psychopaths, which depicts a couple hunting down and killing the Phantom Killer.
- Smokey and the Bandit depicts the protagonists making an illegal beer run, with Texarkana being the town where the beer is obtained.
- Vacation (2015) depicts a family passing by a highway sign reading "Texarkana."
- Walk the Line depicts Elvis's performance at the Arkansas Municipal Auditorium.
- Zombieland depicts a scene wherein Woody Harrelson's character says he figures his zombie-killing relationship with Jesse Eisenberg's character will last "all the way to Texarkana."

=== Music ===
- "All My Ex's Live in Texas" a country song by George Strait includes the line: "Rosanna's down in Texarkana."
- "Call It What You Want" by Tesla includes the line: "...and that's just a boy from Texarkana."
- "Cotton Fields" a blues song by Lead Belly and covered by many others, includes the line: "Just about a mile from Texarkana."
- "East Bound and Down" by Jerry Reed includes the line: "the boys are thirsty in Atlanta, and there's beer in Texarkana."
- "I've Been Everywhere" by Johnny Cash includes the line: "I've been to Houston, Kingston, Texarkana."
- "Let's Jump the Broomstick" by Brenda Lee includes the line: "goin' to Alabama back from Texarkana."
- "No Place Like You" by Maddie & Tae includes the line: "killing time in Texarkana, rolling tide in Alabama."
- "Texarkana" by R.E.M.
- "Texarkana Baby" by Eddy Arnold
- "Texarkana to Panama City" by Lee Rocker
- "Texarkana Resistance" by Vatican Shadow
- "Texas" by The Charlie Daniels Band includes this line: "runs from Texarkana to El Paso."
- "Texas Swing" by Clay Walker includes the line: "why all it's good to be back from Lubbock, Texarkana."
- "Train to Texarkana" by Shawn Howard
- "Ride" by Trace Adkins
- "Ride My Llama" by Neil Young includes the line: "I'm gonna ride my llama from Peru to Texarkana."
- "Southern Hallelujah" by Trace Adkins includes the line: "Bama belles set hearts pumpin' Texarkana maids are something."
- "24 Hours At A Time" by The Marshall Tucker Band has the line: "Tryin' to reach that Arkansas line but Texarkana's an hour ahead" in the first verse and that verse repeats later in the song.

=== Restaurants ===
Texarkana in Greenwich Village, New York City, New York. The restaurant is defunct and in its former location is a restaurant called Alta.

=== Local newspaper ===
- Texarkana Gazette

=== Local TV stations ===
Texarkana is part of a television market that also includes Shreveport, Louisiana as its central city.

KTAL-TV Channel 6 is an NBC affiliate licensed to Texarkana, Texas and serving the Shreveport - Texarkana market; its primary studios are located in Downtown Shreveport, with a secondary facility located at 3716 Summerhill Road in Texarkana.
