= Museum of Regional History (Texarkana) =

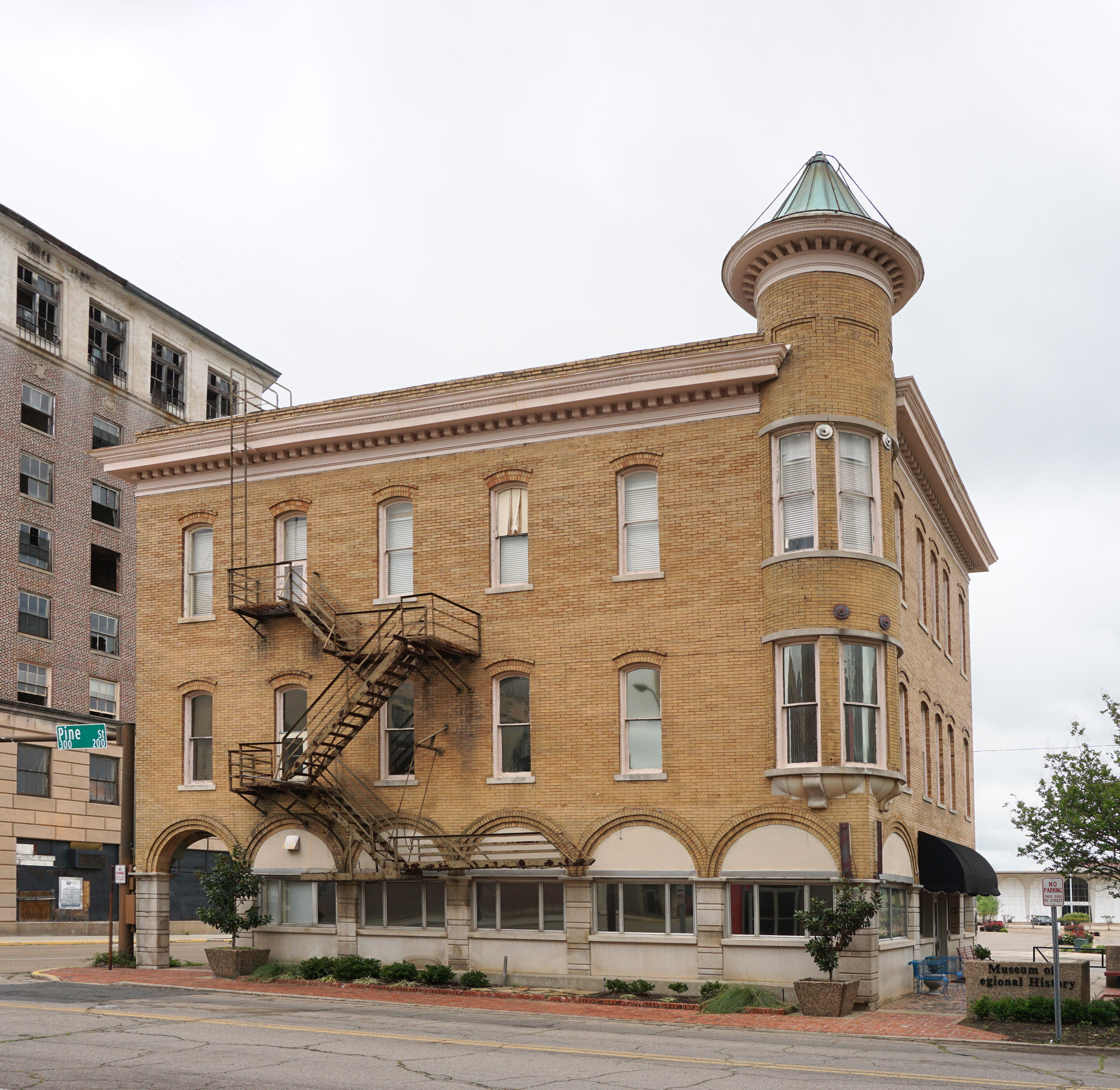
- Exterior of the Museum of Regional History
- Established: 1971
- Location: State Line Ave. and 3rd St., Texarkana, Texas
- Coordinates: 33°25′20″N 94°02′36″W
- Type: Local history museum
- Website: Museum of Regional History
- Offenhauser Insurance Building
- U.S. National Register of Historic Places
- Recorded Texas Historic Landmark
- Location within Texas Location within the United States
- Area: 0.2 acres (0.081 ha)
- Built: 1901
- Architectural style: Commercial style
- NRHP reference No.: 71000922
- RTHL No.: 9497

Significant dates
- Added to NRHP: February 25, 1971
- Designated RTHL: 1965

The Museum of Regional History (originally the Texarkana Historical Museum) is a local history museum in Texarkana, Texas. It is the first and oldest museum in the Texarkana metropolitan area; it was established in 1971. It is located in the Offenhauser Insurance Building, which was built in 1879, making it the oldest brick building in the city.

The Museum of Regional History narrates the history of the region, from its indigenous Caddo people and early Spanish and French explorers, to its agriculture and early industry, to its relationship to railroads, World War II, and the civil rights movement. Its Caddo collections include jewelry, pottery, and tools as well as rare images. Its most prominent collection documents the region's musical history, which includes Scott Joplin (widely recognized as the "Father of Ragtime"), Huddie "Leadbelly" Ledbetter, and Conlon Nancarrow. This collection emphasizes jazz and folk music, and includes one of Joplin's pianos. The museum also has an exhibit on Texas Congressman Wright Patman.

The Museum of Regional History additionally houses the Wilbur Smith Research Library and Archives, which holds photographs and research materials, including rare books and other documents. The archives also includes the Texarkana city directory collection and Pioneer History files.

The museum is compliant with the Americans with Disabilities Act. It is also both a Recorded Texas Historic Landmark and on the National Register of Historic Places.

== See also ==
- National Register of Historic Places listings in Bowie County, Texas
- Recorded Texas Historic Landmarks in Bowie County
