= New Boston Independent School District =

School district in Texas

New Boston Independent School District is a public school district based in New Boston, Texas (USA). In addition to New Boston, the district also serves the community of Boston.

In 2009, the school district was rated "academically acceptable" by the Texas Education Agency.

== Schools ==
- New Boston High School (Grades 9‍–‍12)

During 2022‍–‍2023, New Boston High School had an enrollment of 321 students in grades 9‍–‍12 and a student to teacher ratio of 8.74.

- New Boston Middle School (Grades 6‍–‍8)

During 2022‍–‍2023, New Boston Middle School had an enrollment of 249 students in grades 6‍–‍8 and a student to teacher ratio of 9.34.

- Crestview Elementary School (Grades PK‍–‍5)

During 2022‍–‍2023, Crestview Elementary School had an enrollment of 584 students in grades PK‍–‍5 and a student to teacher ratio of 10.86.
