= The Town That Dreaded Sundown (1976 film) =

1976 film by Charles B. Pierce

- Theatrical release poster by Ralph McQuarrie
- Directed by: Charles B. Pierce
- Written by: Earl E. Smith
- Produced by: Charles B. Pierce; Samuel Z. Arkoff
- Starring: Ben Johnson; Andrew Prine; Dawn Wells
- Narrated by: Vern Stierman
- Cinematography: Jim Roberson
- Edited by: Tom Boutross
- Music by: Jaime Mendosa-Nava
- Production company: Charles B. Pierce Film Productions
- Distributed by: American International Pictures
- Release dates: December 17, 1976 (Texarkana); December 24, 1976 (United States)
- Running time: 90 minutes
- Country: United States
- Language: English
- Budget: $400,000
- Box office: $4–5 million

The Town That Dreaded Sundown is a 1976 American slasher filmdirected and co-produced by Charles B. Pierce and written by Earl E. Smith. The film stars Ben Johnson, Andrew Prine, and Dawn Wells. It is loosely based on the 1946 Texarkana Moonlight Murders, crimes attributed to an unidentified serial killer known as the Phantom Killer.

The Town That Dreaded Sundown premiered in Texarkana on December 17, 1976 before receiving a nationwide theatrical release on December 24 by American International Pictures. The film received generally negative reviews from critics, but was a box-office hit, grossing between $4 million and $5 million against a production budget of $400,000.

A metasequel of the same name was released in October 2014.

== Plot ==
About eight months after the end of World War II, Texarkana is a pleasant community and its citizens are preparing for a good future. On the night of Sunday, March 3, 1946, Sammy Fuller and Linda Mae Jenkins park on a lovers' lane. Soon, the hood of the car opens and closes and a man with a bag over his head with holes cut out for his eyes is seen holding wires he had yanked from the engine. While Sammy tries starting the car, the man breaks his window and pulls him out, cutting him on the broken glass. The man then gets inside the car with Linda.

The next morning, Linda is found on the side of the road barely alive. While at the crime scene, Deputy Norman Ramsey reports that both victims are still alive. He leaves a message for Sheriff Barker to meet him at Michael-Meagher Hospital. At the hospital, a doctor tells Sheriff Barker that Linda was not raped but that her back, stomach, and breasts were "heavily bitten; literally chewed." At the police station, Barker suggests to Police Chief Sullivan to warn teens and college students from parking on lonely roads.

On March 24, while investigating a lovers' lane in heavy rain, Ramsey hears gunshots and finds Howard W. "Buddy" Turner dead in a ditch and the corpse of his girlfriend, Emma Lou Cook, tied to a tree. Ramsey spots the hooded man escaping in a car. Panicked, the town sells out of guns and other home safety equipment. Sheriff Barker calls in help and tells Ramsey they are getting the most famous criminal investigator in the country, the "Lone Wolf" of the Texas Rangers, Captain J.D. Morales. After arriving, Morales explains he will be in charge of the investigation and calls the unidentified attacker a Phantom. Ramsey is assigned to assist Morales, and Patrolman A.C. "Sparkplug" Benson is to be his driver.

At the barber shop, Ramsey explains to Morales his theory that the Phantom attacks every 21 days. The next attack falls on the day of a high school prom, and decoys are set up on the edges of town. After the dance, on April 14, trombone player Peggy Loomis leaves with her boyfriend Roy Allen. Despite her worries, they go to Spring Lake Park in the middle of town. When they leave, the Phantom jumps on the driver's door and pulls Roy out of the car, causing Peggy to crash. She flees as the Phantom beats Roy, but he catches her and ties her hands around a tree. Roy awakens, but is shot to death while attempting to escape. The Phantom attaches a pocket knife to the distal end of the slide of Peggy's trombone and kills her while "playing" the instrument by repeatedly projecting the slide-with-knife forward into her back while she is tied to the tree.

Morales and other officers meet with psychiatrist Dr. Kress at a restaurant, where he explains that the Phantom is a highly intelligent sadist with a strong sex drive, between the ages of 35 and 40. As Kress expresses his doubts about their chances of capturing the Phantom, the Phantom's shoes are shown, revealing that he had heard the entire conversation. At the station, a man named Johnson says that he was robbed and forced to drive a man to Lufkin at gunpoint. While on the road, Ramsey receives a report about an armed suspect, and a brief chase ensues. The suspect, Eddie LeDoux, at first denies everything, then confesses to being the Phantom, but Morales is unconvinced. Johnson identifies him as his robber.

On May 3, Helen Reed is seen by the Phantom leaving a grocery store. At home that night, Helen asks her husband Floyd, who is sitting in front of a window in his armchair, if he hears somebody walking outside. After he replies that he does not, the Phantom shoots him through their window. Helen inspects and sees Floyd dying. As she uses the telephone to call police, the Phantom breaks through the screen door and shoots her twice in the face. Despite her wounds, she drags herself out of the house and into a cornfield while the Phantom inspects Floyd's body. The Phantom stalks her with a pickaxe, but leaves when she gets help at a nearby house. News of this attack causes the town to panic, and people begin boarding up their windows.

Morales and Ramsey receive a report about a stolen car that matches the one from the Turner and Cook murders. While investigating a sand pit, they encounter the Phantom. Morales shoots at him but misses, causing him to run into the woods. The Phantom escapes by jumping past a moving train, but is shot in the leg. While the officers are waiting for the train to pass, the Phantom escapes. They continue their search, but never find him.

Years later, "The Town That Dreaded Sundown" is being shown at a local theater in Texarkana, and the killer's boots are shown as he gets in line to see the film.

== Cast ==
- Ben Johnson as Captain J.D. Morales, based on the lead investigator, Texas Rangers Company B Captain M. T. "Lone Wolf" Gonzaullas
- Andrew Prine as Deputy Norman Ramsey, a fictional character slightly based on Bowie County Sheriff Bill Presley
- Dawn Wells as Helen Reed, based on Katie Starks, from the final pair of actual victims
- Jimmy Clem as Sgt. Mal Griffin
- Jim Citty as Police Chief R.J. Sullivan
- Charles B. Pierce as Patrolman A.C. Benson, a fictional comic-relief character
- Robert Aquino as Sheriff Otis Barker
- Cindy Butler as Peggy Loomis, based on victim Betty Jo Booker, from the third pair of actual victims
- Christine Ellsworth as Linda Mae Jenkins, based on Mary Jeanne Larey, from the first pair of actual victims

In addition, other victims are played by: Mike Hackworth as Sammy Fuller, based on Jimmy Hollis, from the first pair of actual victims; Misty West and Rick Hildreth as murdered couple Emma Lou Cook and Buddy Turner, respectively, based on the second pair of actual victims, Richard L. Griffin and Polly Ann Moore; and Steve Lyons as Roy Allen, based on Paul Martin, from the third pair of actual victims. Bud Davis plays Phantom Killer, whose face is never seen. Narration throughout the film was provided by Vern Stierman.

== Production ==
Principal photography began on Monday, June 21, in the very hot summer of 1976 for about four weeks. Locations included Scott, Arkansas, Shreveport, Louisiana, Garland City, Arkansas, and Texarkana, Texas. The last scene filmed was the first attack, which was shot in front of Pierce's home in Shreveport. About 19 Texarkana locals starred in the film along with several extras.

Pierce called Dawn Wells on July 8, 1976, to star in his film. She arrived by plane in Texarkana before noon the next day. She stayed in Texarkana for six days, but completed her scenes in the first two. While filming the cornfield scene, Wells was almost attacked by a bulldog, but the crew scared it away by shooting at it. Wells wanted to talk to the real-life survivor of her role, Katie Starks, but Katie refused. The Town That Dreaded Sundown was Wells' fourth film and her second time working with Pierce. During her stay, she did not read the script; she relied on the director, instead. She said that was the way she wanted it. Wells explained, "Acting-wise, it's an extremely emotional role. I didn't want to pattern my interpretation after anything. I wanted to go on my own feelings." Being shot at was a new experience for the actress. "They planted a charge in the receiver, so I was standing there holding the phone, shaking, expecting the receiver to blow up in my face."

Andrew Prine, who played Norman Ramsey, wrote the last fifth of the film because it had no ending. Both Ben Johnson and he were hung over while filming the train scene after partying the night before. During the rain scene with Ramsey, a snake made its way on the set. Crew members were yelling at Andrew that it was a moccasin, but Prine wanted to finish his scene without reshooting, so the crew killed the snake afterwards.

== Release ==
=== Marketing ===
The film's poster art was painted with acrylic by graphic illustrator Ralph McQuarrie, then an unknown. McQuarrie had painted the poster for Pierce's The Legend of Boggy Creek, then later for his films Bootleggers (1974), Winterhawk (1975), and Winds of Autumn (1976). McQuarrie became recognized for his talent and went on to paint posters for Creature from Black Lake (1976), Close Encounters of the Third Kind (1977), Battlestar Galactica (1978), Back to the Future (1985), and the original Star Wars trilogy. His concept art was used to help convince 20th Century Fox to fund Star Wars. The advertising department placed the controversial phrase, "In 1946, this man killed five people...today he still lurks the streets of Texarkana, Ark." on the poster. After Texarkana city officials threatened to sue, Pierce tried having the statement removed. The last part of the phrase was censored or removed in advertisements, but it remained on several posters.

=== Theatrical run ===
The film was released theatrically in the United States by American International Pictures, premiering in Texarkana on December 17, 1976, before receiving a national release on Christmas Eve 1976.

The film was released internationally in Sweden (1977), West Germany (1978), and the Philippines (1979). It was played at drive-ins until the end of 1977 and made its television on HBO on June 30, 1978.

=== Home media ===
The film was released on VHS in 1983 by Warner Home Video, who reissued it in 1988. Good Times Video also released it on VHS on May 15, 2001. The Turner Classic Movies cable channel occasionally airs widescreen versions of the film. It had a digital release on May 21, 2013, when Shout! Factory released it on a Blu-ray/DVD combo with Pierce's 1979 film The Evictors.

== Reception ==
=== Contemporaneous ===
Vincent Canby of The New York Times wrote, "A couple of professional actors, Ben Johnson and Andrew Prine, head the cast, but the film looks nonprofessional in every other respect." Variety declared that "Pierce inserts bloody murders into the pic like clockwork, and that's about all there is to it. Film never reaches the truly frightening level of Tobe Hooper's The Texas Chain Saw Massacre, a much more stylish exploitation pic with a similar theme. And on a more serious dramatic level, it doesn't really delve into the hysteria such killings cause among the police and the citizenry, the way Dirty Harry did." Kevin Thomas of the Los Angeles Times called it "this week's trash picture," writing that the film had "no discernible point except to depict a series of particularly grisly killings with a lingering, graphic morbidity." Gene Siskel of the Chicago Tribune gave it half a star out of four, calling it "a dumb film" that "ends unsatisfactorily without our knowing who the killer is, his motive, or whether he is now dead or alive."

Larry Fisher, a film critic for the Delta Democrat-Times, gave the film a three-star rating out of five. He said Ben Johnson gave a superb performance as Captain J.D. Morales, and, "Although the picture lacks a strong ending, Pierce does one of the most credible jobs of engineering the tense, horrifying murder scenes." Mark Melson, Shreveport Times Amusement editor, opined that it "may prove interesting to some viewers for one reason or another," but was "ultimately unsatisfying."

"I've been accused of going a little too far off the deep end with that trombone scene, but it worked. When that picture played opening night in Texarkana, a lot of people were there who had grown up during that time. When that trombone scene was over, you could've heard a pin drop. I'm telling you, everybody was just frozen."
– Charles B. Pierce on the "trombone scene"

William Whitaker of the Abilene Reporter-News gave the film a negative review, stating, "where I was expecting a dramatic retelling of the mysterious case concerning the phantom killer and his bizarre murders, I was greeted with an extremely uneven picture, collapsing into the most sickening, blood-weltering scenes one minute and then lapsing into some incredibly bad comedy relief the next." He continued, "Such vivid contrasts in the film's approach to its subject lead to its downfall. Any effect the disgustingly boring and extremely brutal murder scenes have go to waste seconds later when director Charles B. Pierce leads the picture into some of the type of poor comedy relief that one is used to seeing in budget pictures of the '60s. As a result, the film is unable to conjure up any mood or suspense." He concludes with, "All in all, the picture is an unpleasant little film and Pierce, after going overboard on the blood and gore scenes, never seems to be able to decide as to how serious the picture should be," and that "both mature and immature minds should avoid the film." A reporter in El Paso, Texas, gave it a mixed review, writing that "this mixture of humor with fact saved The Town... as it wakes the audience when things begin to lag." He goes on to write, "All things considered, the movie is entertaining and would appeal to those who savor unsolved murder mysteries." He finishes with, "Don't be surprised if a great many more movies of legendary mass murderers come out in the near future."

=== Modern ===
Scott Weinberg from Fearnet gave the film a positive review, in writing it is, "Arguably the most accomplished feature from the late Charles B. Pierce." He specified, "while the movie offers a slightly stodgy 'voice-over' narration and some moments that seem plucked straight out of '1970s police procedural 101', including a few painful moments of cop-related comic relief, it also delivers some legitimately effective atmosphere, several cool character actors doing fine work, and a handful of sincerely creepy moments."

Bloody Disgusting gave the film five "skulls" in a review by Patrick Cooper, who wrote that it is "a hugely entertaining atmospheric thriller," and that "the only parts that fumble a bit are the regrettable comedic moments... these well-intentioned bits sharply interrupt the serious ambiance of the film, but at least they're few and spaced far enough apart that they don't ruin the whole thing."

On the review aggregator website Rotten Tomatoes, 46% of 13 critics' reviews are positive.

== Historical accuracy ==
The Town That Dreaded Sundown deviates from some facts of the real-life crimes. The beginning of the film states the first attack occurred on Sunday, March 3. In real life, the attack happened on Friday, February 22. Jimmy Hollis (portrayed as "Sammy Fuller") was not pulled out of the window. The girl, Mary Jeanne Larey (portrayed as "Linda Mae Jenkins") was told to run. She was then chased down and sexually assaulted with the attacker's gun. She soon escaped and received help at a house.

The next attack in the film is stated as happening on Saturday, March 24; in 1946, March 24 was a Sunday. In the film, "Howard Turner" and his girlfriend, "Emma Lou Cook," are found dead outside of the vehicle. Emma Cook was shown tied to a tree with bite marks. In real life, both victims were found inside of the vehicle, shot to death. The character "Deputy Ramsey" was patrolling the area and found the bodies. Afterwards, he saw the Phantom getting into a car and leaving. On the real morning of March 24, a passing motorist spotted a car and found the bodies of Richard Griffin and Polly Ann Moore inside before calling the authorities. By the time the officers were on the scene, the killer was gone.

The film states that locals soon started buying guns and locks, but this did not happen until two months later in May. After the second attack, the characters in the film bring in Captain J.D. Morales of the Texas Rangers. M.T. "Lone Wolf" Gonzaullas, the real-life Texas Ranger upon whom the character is based, did not come to Texarkana until after the second double-murder near Spring Lake Park. The film has Morales naming the killer a phantom, but the naming of the killer did not come until after the murders in April, and by the executive editor of the Texarkana Gazette.

The film then shows a high school prom with the character "Peggy Loomis" playing a trombone, and officers setting up decoys in an attempt to capture the Phantom. Betty Jo Booker, who played saxophone (not a trombone) was playing at a Veterans of Foreign Wars (VFW) social event (not a prom), and officers did not set up decoys until after her and friend Paul Martin's murders. In the film, "Peggy" and "Roy" are a couple, but Booker and Martin were only friends in real life. Martin and she were shot to death, and her saxophone was missing for six months.

In the film, "Helen Reed" sees the attacker before being shot. However, Katie Starks was shot through the same window as her husband and did not see her attacker until he tried crawling through the kitchen window.

== Controversies ==
In February 1977, Texarkana city officials voted to file a lawsuit against the film's ad campaign. When city officials visited Washington, DC, they were kidded about the tagline for the movie posters, "In 1946 this man killed five people.... Today he still lurks the streets of Texarkana, Ark.". Mayor Harvey Nelson explained, "The ad is too much; that's just not true. There's objection that this whole thing will be spreading fear in the community. There are relatives of the victims still living here, and this is very unpleasant to them." Pierce worked with American International Pictures to remove the "still lurking" statement, but it remained on the posters.

In 1978, Mark Melton Moore, the brother of real-life victim Polly Ann Moore, took Pierce to court for $1.3 million for invading his privacy. He claimed his sister, who was portrayed as "Emma Lou Cook" in the film, was depicted "as a high school dropout and a woman with loose and low morals; when in fact none of such was true." In real life, Polly Ann Moore graduated high school at the age of 16. The court denied his claim in 1979. Mr. Moore filed again in 1980 to the Texas Supreme Court. The Sixth Court of Civil Appeals in Texarkana agreed again that the film's producers did not invade his privacy and that he was not entitled to any money.

On March 15, 1978, Gerald Gedrimas, a teenager, shot and killed his high school friend James Grunstra. In court, Gedrimas stated that he thought of his plan to be an "outlaw" like Jesse James – the infamous legendary outlaw of the Wild West – while watching The Town That Dreaded Sundown.

== Tradition ==
In Texarkana (where the story is based), this film is shown to the public at Spring Lake Park near Halloween. It is the last film shown for "Movies in the Park," which plays a film on each Thursday during May and October. The showing of the film, which has been a tradition since 2003, is a free event sponsored by the Texarkana Department of Parks & Recreation.

== Sequel ==
A follow-up metasequel by Ryan Murphy and Jason Blum was released on October 16, 2014, in select theaters and then on Video on Demand the following day. The director, Alfonso Gomez-Rejon, directed a script by Roberto Aguirre-Sacasa. Addison Timlin plays the lead role and is supported by Gary Cole, Ed Lauter, and Veronica Cartwright. The film received mostly positive reviews.

== See also ==
- List of films featuring home invasions

== Sources ==
- Blackburn, Lyle (2012). The Beast of Boggy Creek : The True Story of the Fouke Monster. San Antonio, Texas: Anomalist Books. ISBN 978-1-933665-57-3.
- Donahue, Suzanne Mary (1987). American film distribution : the changing marketplace. UMI Research Press. p. 300. ISBN 978-0-8357-1776-2.
- Muir, John Kenneth (2012). Horror Films of the 1980s. Vol. 1. Jefferson, North Carolina: McFarland & Company. ISBN 978-0-786-47298-7. OCLC 840902442.
- Newton, Michael (2013). The Texarkana Moonlight Murders: The Unsolved Case of the 1946 Phantom Killer. Jefferson, North Carolina: McFarland & Company. ISBN 978-0-7864-7325-0.
- Nowell, Richard (2010). Blood Money: A History of the First Teen Slasher Film Cycle. New York City, New York: Bloomsbury. ISBN 978-1-441-12496-8.
