= Kristin Sobolik =

Eighth chancellor of the University of Missouri-St. Louis

8th Chancellor of the University of Missouri-St. Louis
- Incumbent
- Assumed office April 9, 2020
- President: Mun Choi
- Succeeded by: Chris Spilling
- Interim
- In office September 1, 2019 – April 9, 2020
- Preceded by: Thomas F. George

Personal details
- Education: University of Iowa (BS); Texas A&M University (MA, PhD)

Academic background
- Thesis: Paleonutrition of the Lower Pecos Region of the Chihuahuan Desert (1991)
- Doctoral advisors: Vaughn M. Bryant, Jr. D. Gentry Steele

Academic work
- Discipline: Anthropology
- Sub-discipline: archaeobiology paleonutrition
- Institutions: Wright State University; University of Maine; University of Missouri–St. Louis

Kristin Sobolik is an American anthropologist who is the eighth chancellor of the University of Missouri–St. Louis. Sobolik earned a bachelor's degree in biology from the University of Iowa and a master's and doctorate in anthropology from Texas A&M University and has published more than 100 papers, books, and presentations focused on archaeobiology and paleonutrition.

As chancellor, Sobolik oversees the St. Louis region’s leading public research university, serving nearly 15,000 students and contributing more than $555 million in annual economic impact. UMSL also boasts the largest alumni network in the metropolitan area, with graduates contributing an estimated $14.3 billion to Missouri’s economy each year.

During her tenure as chancellor, Sobolik helped create the Student Academic Support Services, a student outreach and support unit with a mission to support students overcoming challenges in their academic studies.

Sobolik is expected to retire at end of June 2026 and be replaced by vice chancellor Chris Spilling, serving as interim chancellor.
