= Ace of Clubs House =

Historic house museum in Texarkana, Texas, United States

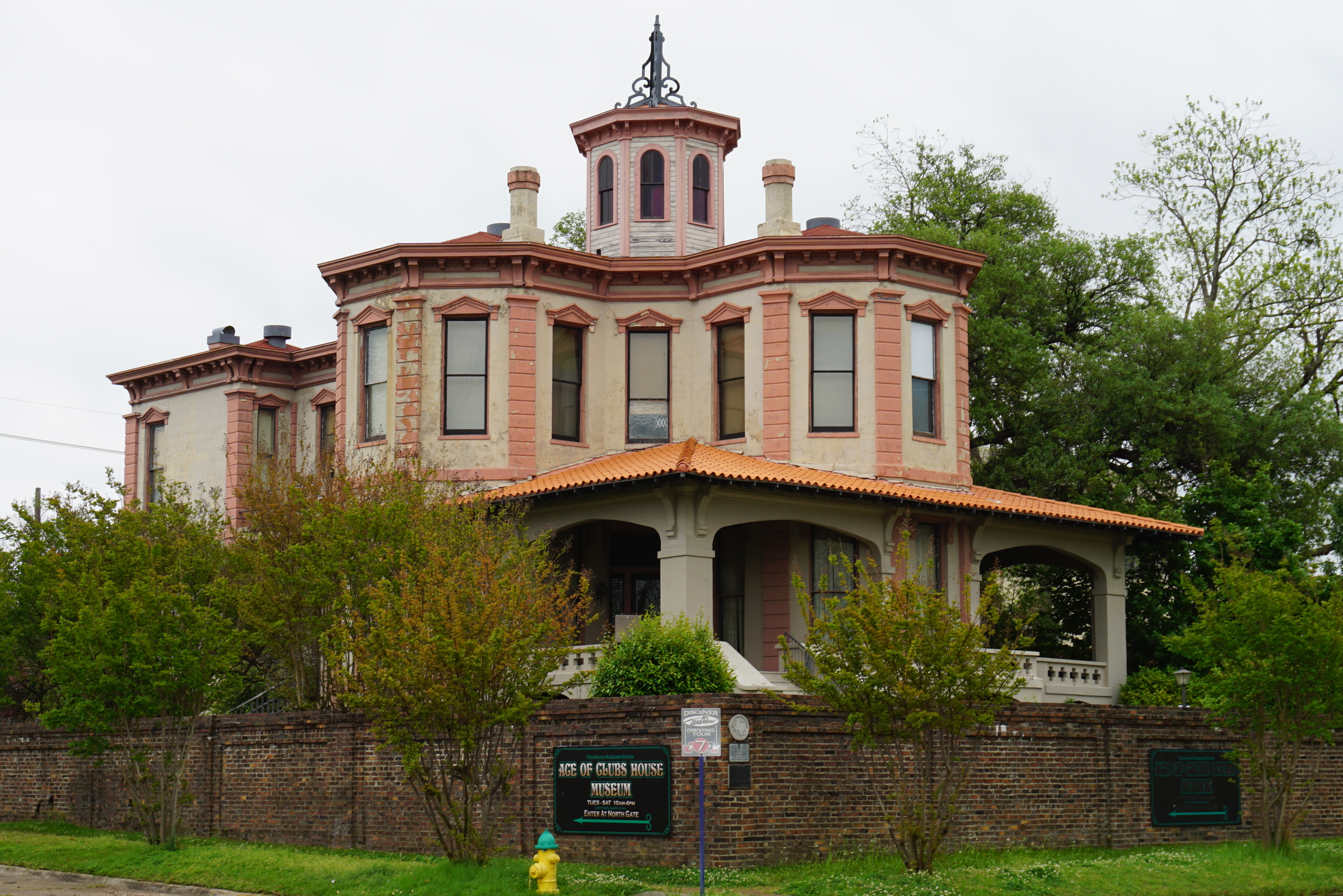
- Exterior of the Ace of Clubs House
- Established: 1988
- Location: 420 Pine St., Texarkana, Texas
- Coordinates: 33°25′27″N 94°02′39″W
- Type: Historic house museum
- Website: Ace of Clubs House
- Draughn-Moore House
- U.S. National Register of Historic Places
- Recorded Texas Historic Landmark
- Location within Texas Location within the United States
- Area: 0.5 acres (0.20 ha)
- Built: 1883
- Architectural style: Italianate
- NRHP reference No.: 76002007
- RTHL No.: 9493

Significant dates
- Added to NRHP: June 29, 1976
- Designated RTHL: 1964

The Ace of Clubs House (also known as the Draughon–Moore House) is a historic house museum in Texarkana, Texas. The house is distinctively shaped like a club, from a deck of playing cards, with three octagon-shaped wings and a fourth rectangular wing adjoining at a central octagon-shaped stair hall. The structure was built in 1885 as a private residence, in an Italianate Victorian architectural style. The design resulted in the house having 22 sides. The two-story house also features a 20-foot (6.1 m) tower and a spiral staircase.

According to local lore, it was shaped as a club because its builder and original owner, Confederate veteran, lumberman, and early Texarkana mayor James Draughon, built it with $10,000 that he won in a game of poker with an ace of clubs. Three families have lived in the house. In 1887, William Lowndes Whitaker, Sr., acquired the building. Whitaker lived in it until 1894, when he sold it to an attorney named Henry Moore, Sr. Henry Moore, Jr., and Tyler native Olivia Smith, his wife, moved into the house in 1920. After Moore, Jr., died in 1942, his widow remained in the house until her own death in 1985, at which point it was deeded to the Texarkana Museum System in her will. The house was refurbished in 1987, and it began operating as a museum in 1988. Each room was restored to represent a different time period in the history of the house, spanning from 1880 to 1940.

The Ace of Clubs House caters to business and club meetings, lawn parties, portrait photography, receptions, and weddings. In 2016, the house's lawn hosted the Texarkana Museums System's Moonlight & Movies classic film series. The house has also hosted a Victorian Christmas celebration.

The Ace of Clubs House has been featured on the HGTV television program Christmas Castles. It is both a property on the National Register of Historic Places and a Recorded Texas Historic Landmark.

== Gallery ==
Staircase inside the Ace of Clubs House

Bas relief in the house

== See also ==
- National Register of Historic Places listings in Bowie County, Texas
- Recorded Texas Historic Landmarks in Bowie County
