= Four States Auto Museum =

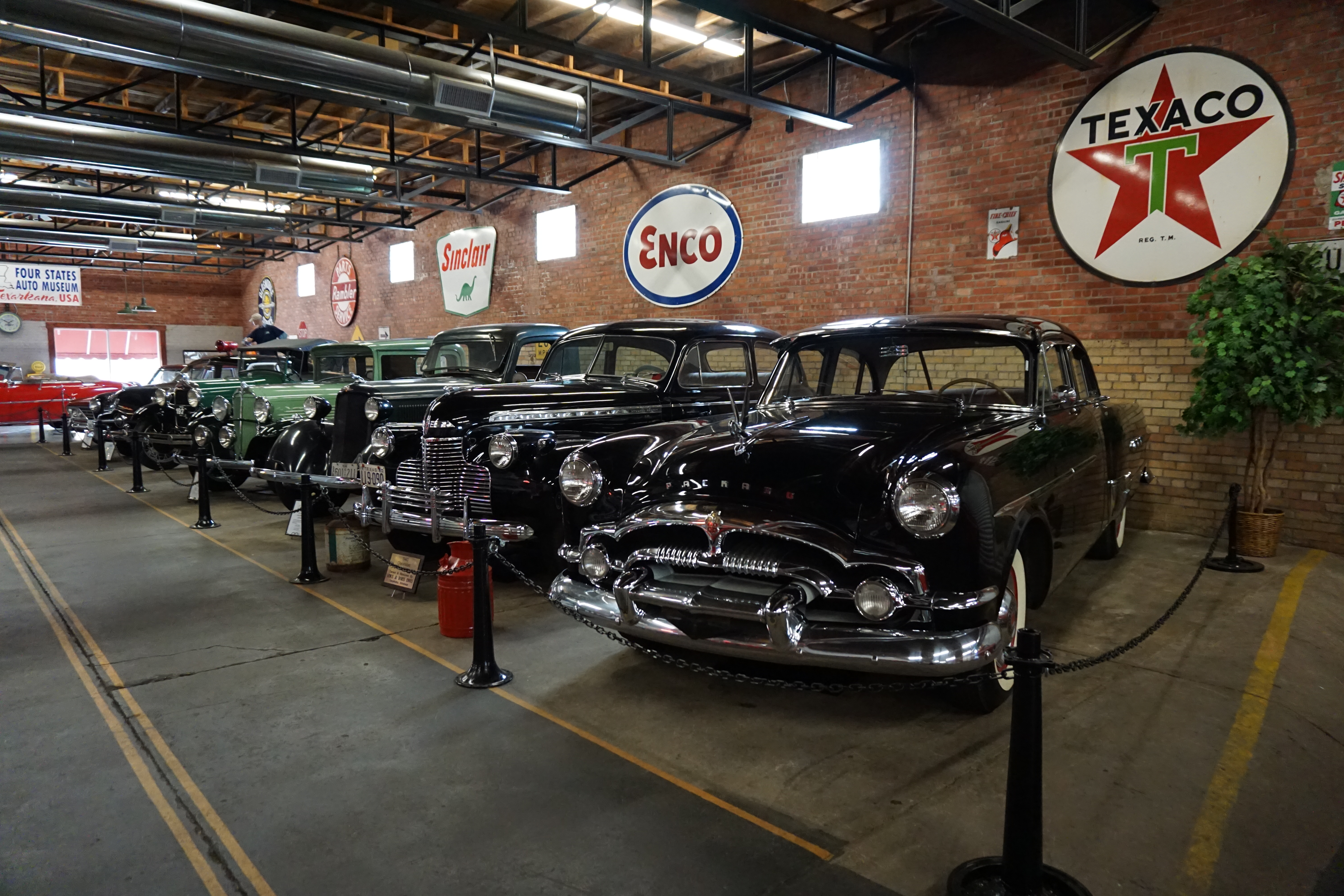
- Interior of the Four States Auto Museum

- Location within Arkansas
- Established: 2004; 22 years ago
- Location: Texarkana, Arkansas
- Coordinates: 33.424312°N 94.038224°W
- Type: Automobile museum
- Website: www.fourstatesautomuseum.org

The Four States Auto Museum (formerly the Tex-Ark Antique Auto Museum) is an automobile museum in Texarkana, Arkansas. It was established in 2004 and chartered as a 501(c)(3) organization in the State of Arkansas. The museum is located on a site formerly used for wagon and automobile body construction.

The Four States Auto Museum's mission is to "preserve, collect, exhibit, operate, and interpret a collection of antique automobiles" and related archival documents. Its collections span 100 years of automotive history and include over 20 automobiles that are displayed on a rotating basis, generally for periods of three to six months. At any one time, the museum has approximately 15 cars on display, as well as a few motorcycles and a variety of automobilia. Among the highlights of the collection are a Civil War vintage horse-drawn hearse, a Ford Model T and Model A, a Nash Metropolitan, a Studebaker dragster, and a 2015 Chevrolet Corvette. The museum also maintains a collection of automotive-related books, newsletters, and periodicals.

The Four States Auto Museum hosts an annual car show in conjunction with Texarkana's RailFest, as well as the annual Fall Fun Car Show & Swap Meet, both of which serve as fundraisers for it. The museum also hosts various educational events, parties, school tours, and weddings.

== Gallery ==
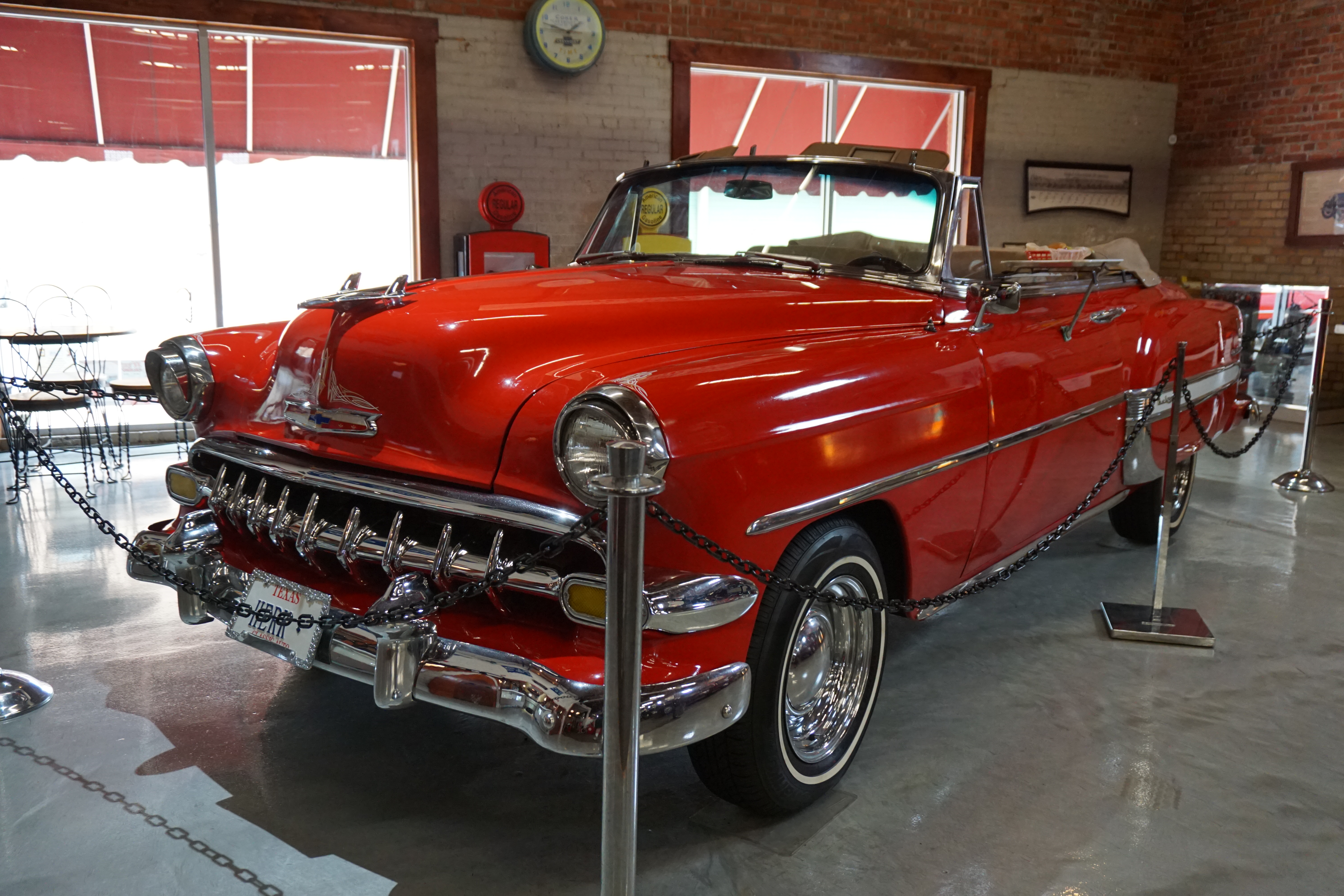
1954 Chevrolet Bel Air

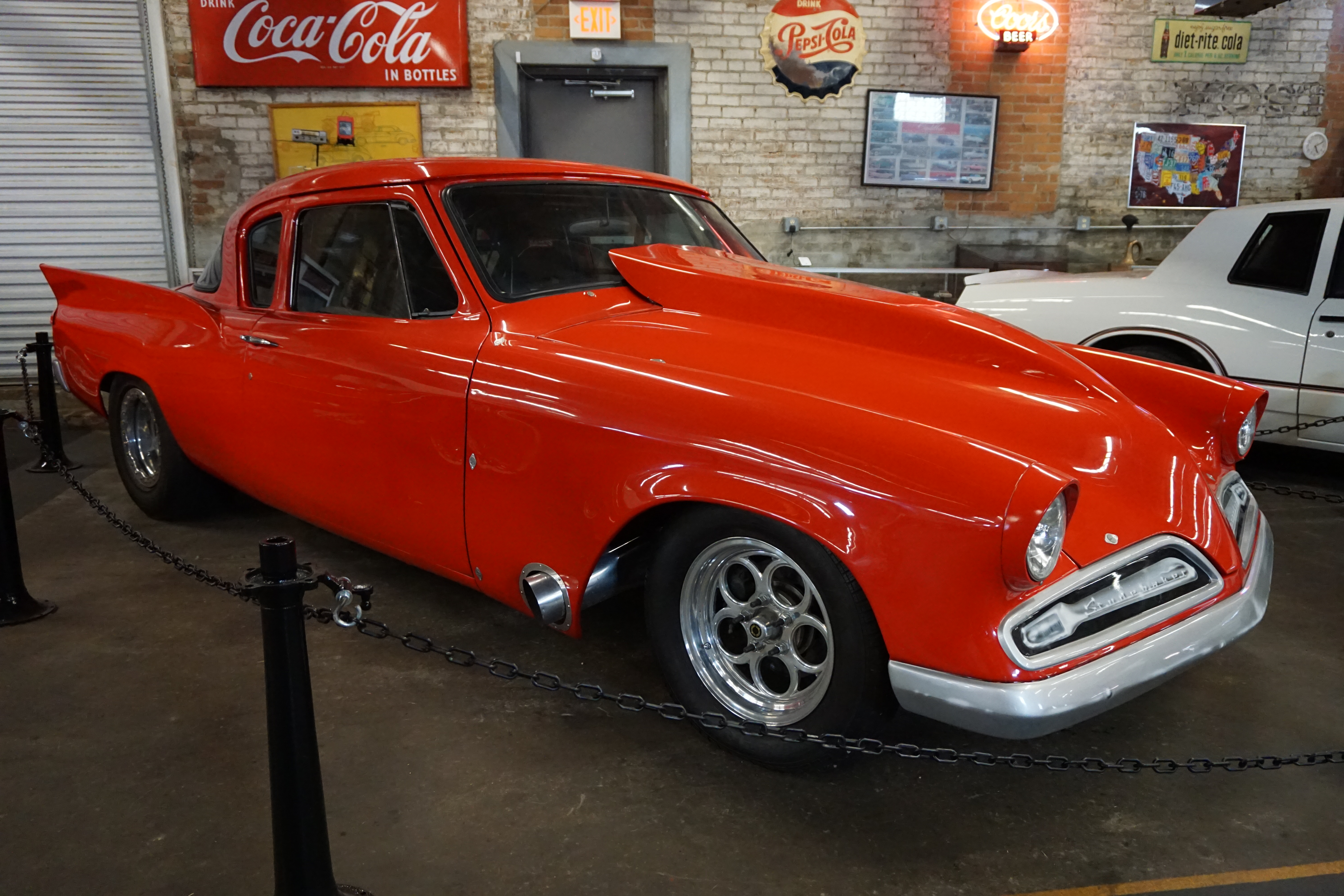
1957 Studebaker Silver Hawk 57G-C3

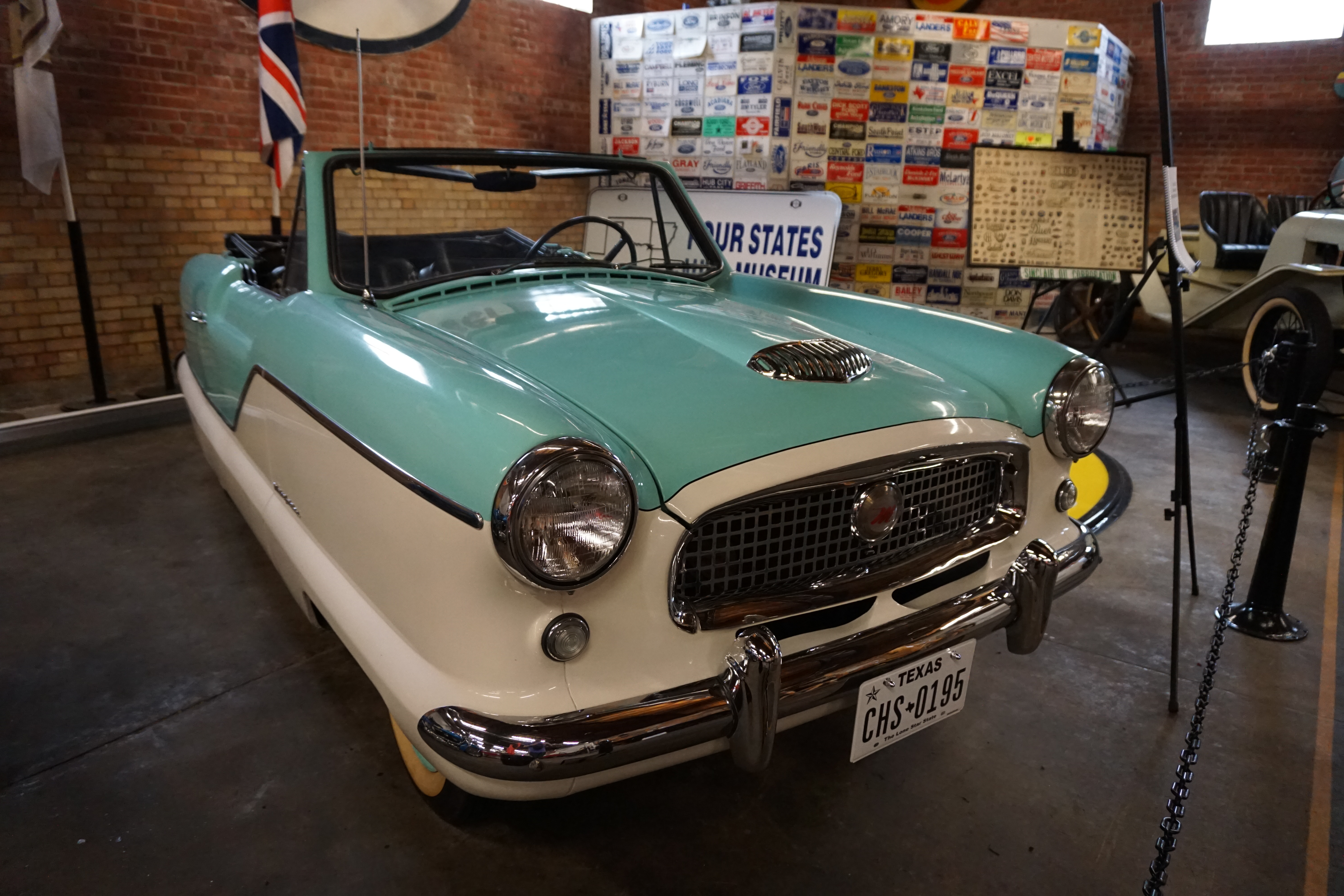
1960 Nash Metropolitan
