= Urban legend =

Form of modern folklore

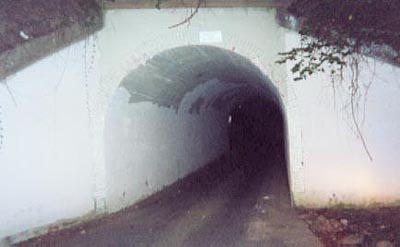
Colchester Overpass, the site of the 1970s urban legend of the "Bunny Man", said to be a man or ghost in a rabbit costume who attacked people in the area

An urban legend (sometimes modern legend or urban myth) is a form of folklore consisting of unusual, humorous, or frightening stories that circulate as true accounts but are typically unverified or apocryphal. These narratives are often shared through word of mouth, social media, or news-like sources and typically involve shocking, mysterious, or cautionary themes.

These legends can be entertaining but often concern mysterious and troubling events, such as disappearances and strange objects or entities. Urban legends may confirm moral standards, reflect prejudices, or be a way to make sense of societal anxieties.

In the past, urban legends were most often circulated orally, at gatherings and around the campfire for instance. Now, they can be spread by any media, including newspapers, mobile news apps, e-mail, and most often, social media. Some urban legends have passed through the years/decades with only minor changes, in where the time period takes place. Generic urban legends are often altered to suit regional variations, but the lesson or moral generally remains the same.

== Origin and structure ==
The term "urban legend", as used by folklorists, has appeared in print since at least 1968, when it was used by Richard Dorson. Jan Harold Brunvand, professor of English at the University of Utah, introduced the term to the general public in a series of popular books published beginning in 1981. Brunvand used his collection of legends, The Vanishing Hitchhiker: American Urban Legends & Their Meanings (1981) to make two points: first, that legends and folklore do not occur exclusively in so-called primitive or traditional societies, and second, that one could learn much about urban and modern culture by studying such tales.

Many urban legends are framed as complete stories with plot and characters. The compelling appeal of a typical urban legend is its elements of mystery, horror, fear, or humor. Often they serve as cautionary tales. Some urban legends are morality tales that depict someone acting in a disagreeable manner, only to wind up in trouble, hurt, or dead.

Urban legends will often try to invoke a feeling of disgust in the reader which tends to make these stories more memorable and potent. Elements of shock value can be found in almost every form of urban legend and are partially what makes these tales so impactful. An urban legend may include elements of the supernatural or paranormal.

== Propagation and belief ==
As Jan Brunvand points out, antecedent legends including some of the motifs, themes and symbolism of the urtexts can readily be identified. Cases that may have been at least partially inspired by real events include "The Death Car" (traced by Richard Dorson to Michigan, United States); "the Solid Cement Cadillac" and the possible origin of "The Hook" in the 1946 series of Lovers' Lane murders in Texarkana, Texas, United States. The urban legend that Coca-Cola developed the drink Fanta to sell in Nazi Germany without public backlash originated as the actual tale of German Max Keith, who invented the drink and ran Coca-Cola's operations in Germany during World War II.

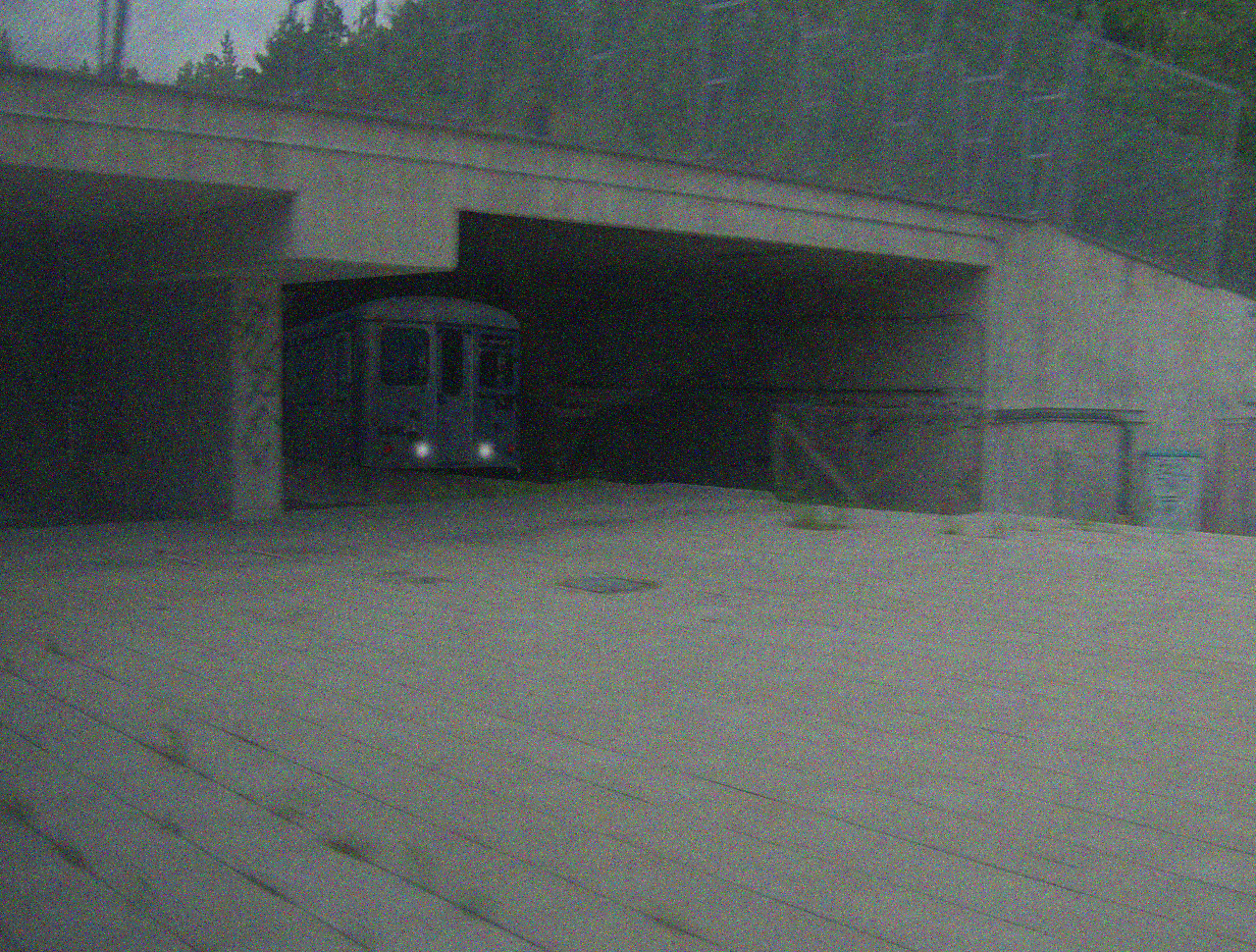
An example of a supposed ghost train, the Silver Train of Stockholm, also known as Silverpilen (the Silver Arrow), artist's impression

The narrator of an urban legend may claim it happened to a friend (or to a friend of a friend), which serves to personalize, authenticate and enhance the power of the narrative while distancing the teller from the tall tale. Many urban legends depict horrific crimes, contaminated foods, or other situations that would potentially affect many people. Anyone believing such stories might feel compelled to warn loved ones. On occasion, news organizations, school officials and even police departments have issued warnings concerning the latest threat. According to the "Lights Out" rumor, street gang members would drive without headlights until a compassionate motorist responded with the traditional flashing of headlights, whereupon a prospective new gang member would have to murder the citizen as a requirement of initiation. A fax retelling this legend received at the Nassau County, Florida, fire department was forwarded to police, and from there to all city departments. The Minister of Defence for Canada was taken in by it also; he forwarded an urgent security warning to all Ontario Members of Parliament.

Urban legends typically include common elements: the tale is retold on behalf of the original witness or participant; dire warnings are often given for those who might not heed the advice or lesson contained therein (a typical element of many e-mail phishing scams); and the tale is often touted as "something a friend told me", the friend being identified by first name only or not identified at all. Such legends seem to be believable and even provocative, as some readers are led in turn to pass them on, including on social media platforms that instantly reach millions worldwide. Many are essentially extended jokes, told as if they were true events.

Persistent urban legends do often maintain a degree of plausibility, as in the story a serial killer deliberately hiding in the back seat of a car. Another such example since the 1970s has been the recurring rumor that the Procter & Gamble Company was associated with Satan-worshippers because of details within its 19th-century "57" trademark. The legend interrupted the company's business to the point that it stopped using the trademark.

== Relation to mythology ==
The earliest term by which these narratives were known, "urban belief tales", highlights what was then thought of as a key property: their tellers regarded the stories as true accounts, and the device of the FOAF (acronym for "Friend of a Friend" invented by English writer and folklorist Rodney Dale in 1976) was a spurious but significant effort at authentication. The coinage leads in turn to the terms "FOAFlore" and "FOAFtale". While at least one classic legend, the "Death Car", has been shown to have some basis in fact, folklorists have an interest in debunking those narratives only to the degree that establishing non-factuality warrants the assumption that there must be some other reason why the tales are told, re-told and believed. As in the case of myth, the narratives are believed because they construct and reinforce the worldview of the group within which they are told, or "because they provide us with coherent and convincing explanations of complex events".

Social scientists have started to draw on urban legends in order to help explain complex socio-psychological beliefs, such as attitudes to crime, childcare, fast food, SUVs and other "family" choices. The authors make an explicit connection between urban legends and popular folklore, such as Grimm's Fairy Tales, where similar themes and motifs arise. For that reason, it is characteristic of groups within which a given narrative circulates to vehemently reject claims or demonstrations of non-factuality; an example would be the expressions of outrage by police officers who are told that adulteration of Halloween treats by strangers (the subject of periodic moral panics) occurs extremely rarely, if at all.

== Documentation ==
The Internet has made it easier both to spread and to debunk urban legends. For instance, the Usenet newsgroup alt.folklore.urban and several other websites, most notably snopes.com, focus on discussing, tracking, and analyzing urban legends. The United States Department of Energy had a now-discontinued service called Hoaxbusters that dealt with computer-distributed hoaxes and legends. The most notable such hoaxes are known as creepypastas, which are typically horror stories written anonymously. Although most are regarded as obviously false, some, such as the Slender Man, have gained a following of people that do believe in them.

Television shows such as Urban Legends, Beyond Belief: Fact or Fiction, and later Mostly True Stories: Urban Legends Revealed, feature re-enactments of urban legends, detailing the accounts of the tales and (typically later in an episode) revealing any factual basis they may have. The Discovery Channel TV show MythBusters (2003–2016) tried to prove or disprove several urban legends by attempting to reproduce them using the scientific method.

The 1998 film Urban Legend featured students discussing popular urban legends while at the same time falling victim to killings re-enacting them. The 1999 film The Blair Witch Project purposefully positioned itself as an urban legend to gain viral hype and succeeded in fooling many that it was based on a real disappearance. The lack of widespread social media and search engines helped it proliferate in the months leading up to its release.

Between 1992 and 1998 The Guardian newspaper "Weekend" section published the illustrated "Urban Myths" column by Phil Healey and Rick Glanvill, with content taken from a series of four books: Urban Myths, The Return of Urban Myths, Urban Myths Unplugged, and Now! That's What I Call Urban Myths. The 1994 comics anthology the Big Book of Urban Legends, written by Robert Boyd, Jan Harold Brunvand, and Robert Loren Fleming, featured 200 urban legends, displayed as comics.

The British writer Tony Barrell has explored urban legends in a long-running column in The Sunday Times. These include the story that Orson Welles began work on a Batman movie in the 1940s, which was to feature James Cagney as the Riddler and Marlene Dietrich as Catwoman; the persistent rumour that the rock singer Courtney Love is the granddaughter of Marlon Brando; and the idea that a famous 1970s poster of Farrah Fawcett contains a subliminal sexual message concealed in the actress's hair.

== Genres ==
=== Crime ===
As with traditional urban legends, many internet rumors are about crimes or crime waves – either fictional or based on real events that have been largely exaggerated. Such stories can be problematic, both because they purport to be relevant modern news and because they do not follow the typical patterns of urban legends.

=== Medicine ===
Some legends are medical folklore, such as the claim that eating watermelon seeds will result in a watermelon growing in the stomach, or that going outdoors just after showering will result in catching a cold. Many old wives' tales have grown around the identification of ailments, real and imagined, and the recommended remedies, rituals, and home-grown medical treatments to treat them.

=== Internet ===
Internet urban legends are those spread through the internet, as through Usenet or email or more recently through other social media. They can also be linked to viral online content. Some take the form of chain letters and spread by e-mail, directing the reader to share them or to meet a terrible fate, and following a recognizable outline of hook, threat, and finally request.

=== Paranormal ===
Paranormal urban-legend stories usually involve someone encountering something supernatural, such as a cryptid—for instance, Bigfoot or Mothman, legendary creatures for which evidence is lacking but which have legions of believers. Research shows that people experiencing sudden or surprising events (such as a Bigfoot sighting) may significantly overestimate the duration of the event.

=== Marketing ===
Companies have been accused of hiding "secret messages" behind their logos or packaging, as in the case of the old Procter & Gamble symbol, supposedly an occult figure that gave panache to the brand. (If the thirteen stars in the symbol were connected a certain way, it would show three sixes in a row or looked at the 3 curls at the bottom they form the inverted 6s.) Similarly, a video of a Christian woman "exposing" Monster Energy for using the Hebrew letter vav ( ו ), forming the letter "M", to disguise the number 666 went viral on Facebook.

== See also ==
- List of urban legends
- Factoid
- Woozle effect
