= Clarence Hill =

Clarence Hill may refer to:

- Clarence Hill (boxer) (born 1951), Bermudan Olympic boxer
- Clarence Hill (murderer) (1957–2006), petitioner in the U.S. Supreme Court case of Hill v. McDonough, executed for murder
- Clarence Hill (serial killer) (1910–1973), attacked couples at lovers' lanes in Duck Island, New Jersey

== See also ==
- Hill (surname)
