= Lovers' lane =

Secluded area where people kiss, make out, or engage in sexual activity

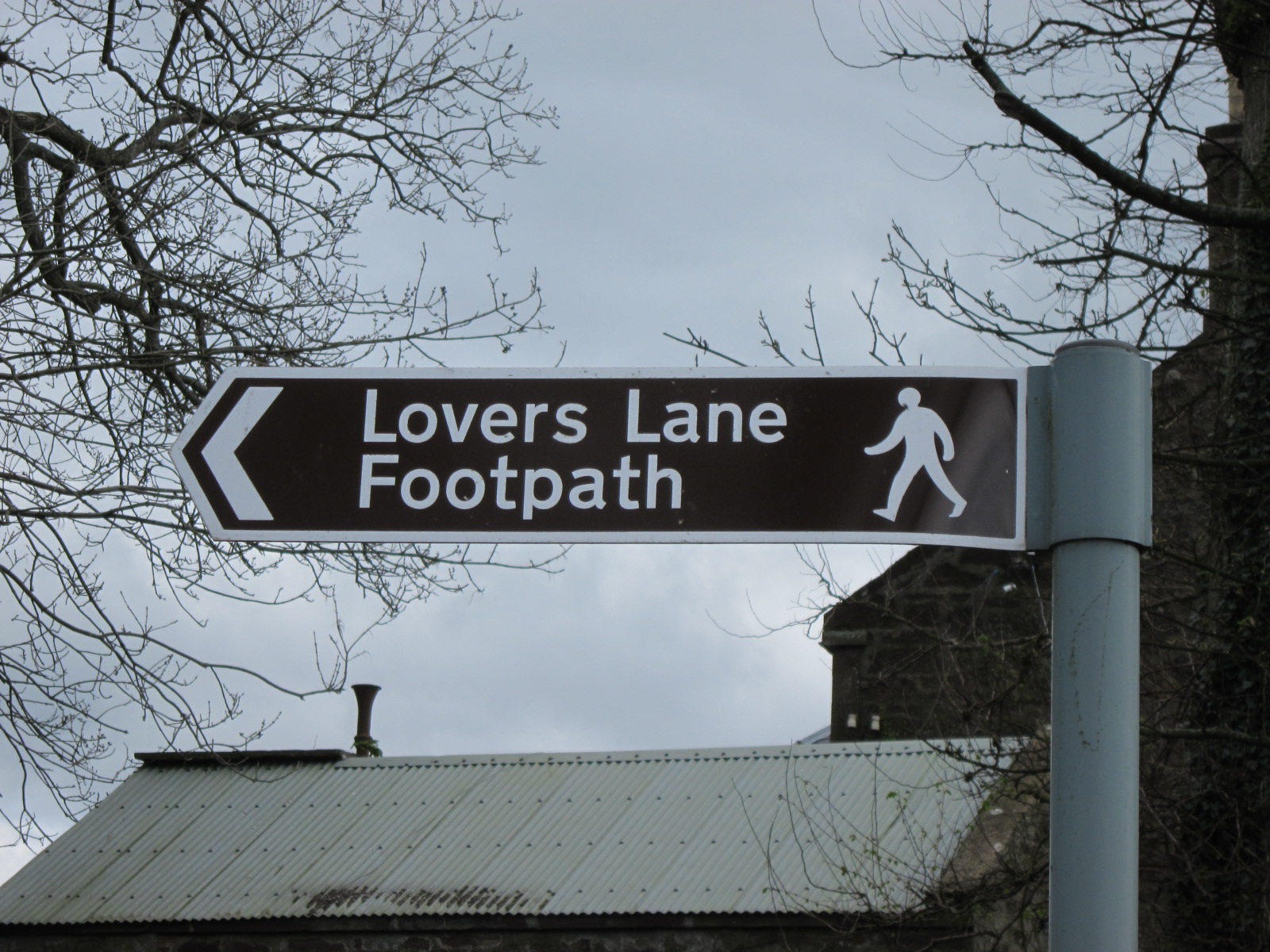
Sign for a lovers' lane in Maybole, Scotland

A lovers' lane is a secluded area where people kiss, make out, or engage in sexual activity. These areas range from parking lots in secluded rural areas to places with extraordinary views of a cityscape or other features. The Oxford English Dictionary records use of the phrase "lovers' lane" from 1853.

While some traditional paths still maintain the name, in more recent generations "lovers' lanes" are often found in cultures built around the automobile—lovers often make out in a car or van for privacy.

== Crime ==
The typically isolated locations of most lovers' lanes have occasionally made them subject to violent crime. For example:

- The serial killer Charles Barr targeted couples at lovers' lanes in Memphis, Tennessee, in 1923. He was executed for the crimes in 1926.
- Three couples were attacked at a remote lovers' lane in Duck Island, New Jersey, between 1938 and 1942. Clarence Hill confessed and was convicted of the murders two years later.
- A series of unsolved murders and violent crimes in 1946, dubbed the Texarkana Moonlight Murders, began with two attacks which targeted couples at lovers' lanes in the Texarkana area.
- In Palos Verdes, California, a gang of teens robbed multiple cars on a lovers' lane in October 1955, and were caught raping a thirteen-year-old girl.
- In 1963, a lovers' lane site at Fuller's Bridge, Sydney, became notorious as the location of the bodies of the CSIRO scientist Dr. Gilbert Stanley Bogle and Margaret Olive Chandler, the wife of one of his colleagues. The cause of death, while indicative of poisoning, could not be definitively determined, and apart from Mrs. Chandler's husband, Geoffrey, who was considered the prime suspect by the New South Wales Police, no one to date has been charged. The Bogle-Chandler case has baffled law enforcement and forensic experts up to present day.
- Several of the Zodiac Killer's victims were murdered in lovers' lanes in northern California.
- Victims of the Monster of Florence were couples murdered in lovers' lanes near Florence, Italy.
- In 1971, Patricia Mann and Jesse McBane were kidnapped from one lovers' lane and murdered at another. The next year, another couple narrowly escaped a similar kidnapping from a lovers' lane.
- Several attacks perpetrated by the Son of Sam serial killer also took place in such settings.
- Three couples were shot with a .38 caliber pistol by an unidentified perpetrator in the Atlanta Lover's Lane Murders of 1977, resulting in three deaths.
- Two Mercer University students were killed by Andy Cook at a lovers' lane location in Georgia on January 2, 1995.

== In popular culture ==
- A lovers' lane is typically the setting of "The Hook", an urban legend about a young couple menaced by a hook-handed killer.
- Lovers' lanes have featured in numerous popular songs; tracks with that title have been released by Squirrel Nut Zippers (1995), Georgio (1987), FireHouse (1990), The Other (2006) and Hunx and His Punx (2011), as well as an instrumental melodic trance track by Ørjan Nilsen (2010). The Go-Betweens' 1988 sixth album was titled 16 Lovers Lane, and the 1992 debut album by M.C. Brains was similarly titled.
- Films titled Lovers' Lane were released in 1924, 1999, and 2005. Episodes of the television series 77 Sunset Strip (in 1964), Roseanne (in 1988) and Cold Case (in 2004) also had this title.

== See also ==
- Gropecunt Lane
- Lover's Leap
- Cruising for sex
