= Central Mall (Texarkana) =

Coordinates: 33.4555°N 94.0804°W

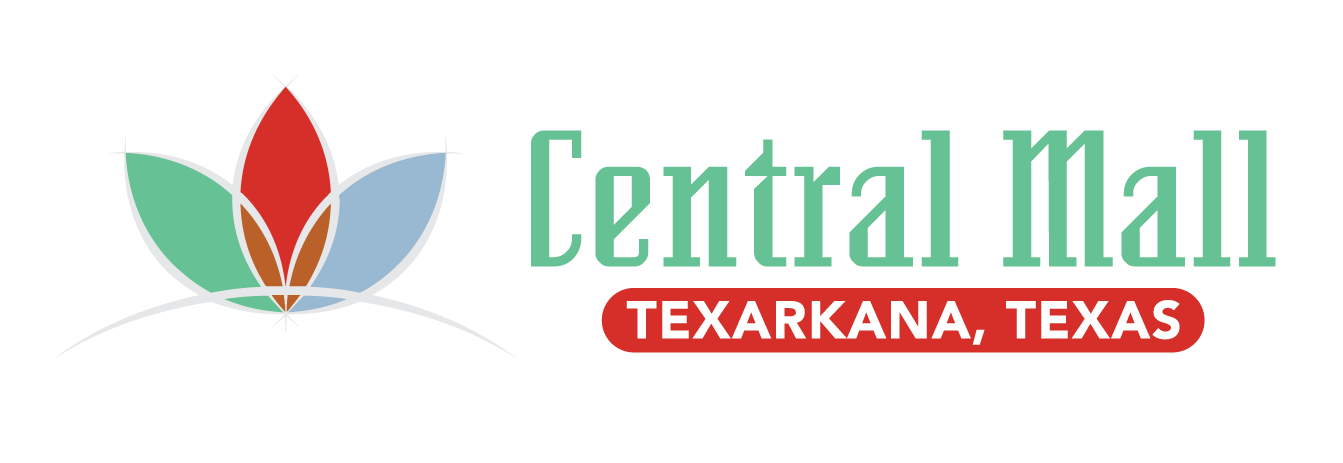
- Location: Texarkana, Texas, U.S.
- Address: 2400 Richmond Road
- Opened: August 9, 1978
- Developer: Warmack & Company
- Owner: 4th Dimension Properties
- Num. of stores: 60+
- Num. of anchor tenants: 3 (2 open, 1 vacant)
- Floor area: 678,480 square feet (63,033 m^{2})
- Floors: 1
- Website: centralmalltexarkana.com

Central Mall is an enclosed shopping mall located in Texarkana, Texas. Opened in 1978, the anchor stores are Dillard's and JCPenney.

== History ==
Fort Smith, Arkansas-based Warmack & Company, the developer of the mall, began construction in June 1977. The mall's location, specifically its parking lot, is the location of the lover's lane where three of the Texarkana Moonlight Murders in 1946 took place. Opening in 1978 with 586,497 square feet, Central Mall overtook Oaklawn Village Shopping Center as the largest shopping destination in the Texarkana metro, at more than four times its size. Dillard's, JCPenney, and Sears were the mall's original anchor tenants. The Texarkana location of Dillard's marked the second location in its entire chain for the Little Rock, Arkansas-based company, which now operates 282 stores across 29 states. Warmack & Company retained ownership of the mall until it was sold in 2004.

In 2016, Dillard's fully remodeled and expanded its store by 42,000 square feet. Upon reopening, the Texarkana Dillard's began offering higher-end merchandise, which, according to Dillard's, is typically reserved for its stores in larger retail markets. On June 6, 2017, it was announced that Sears, an original tenant, would be closing as part of a plan to close 72 stores nationwide; the store closed in September 2017.

On September 26, 2018, the mall was offered for auction after its owners out of Atlanta, Georgia, defaulted on a $134.5 million loan. On March 19, 2020, it was announced that Bealls would close, leaving Dillard's and JCPenney as the mall's only anchors. A limited liability company tied to Kohan Retail Investment Group currently owns the mall. In April 2024, 4th Dimension Properties acquired the Central Mall.
