= Rodney Dale =

English author (1933–2020)

Rodney A.M. Dale
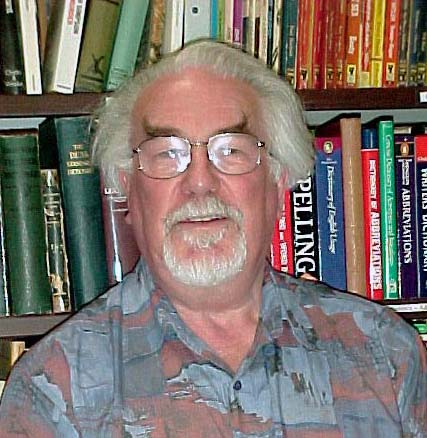
- Born: 28 November 1933; Muswell Hill, London, England
- Died: 29 March 2020 (aged 86); Cottenham, Cambridgeshire, England
- Occupations: Author, editor, publisher
- Writing career
- Subjects: Non-fiction topics (biography, technology, computing, jazz, illustration, and folklore); fiction

Rodney A.M. Dale (28 November 1933 – 29 March 2020) was an English author, editor, publisher, and a co-founder and former member of Cambridge Consultants Ltd. He wrote principally on non-fiction topics (biography, technology, computing, jazz, illustration, and folklore), as well as three novels, a number of poems, and pantomimes.

== Early life ==
Rodney A.M. Dale was born in Muswell Hill, North London, to Donald and Celia Dale on 28 November 1933. In 1939, at the onset of World war II, the family left London for Cambridge. He attended The Perse School from 1940 to 1952. In 1953, Dale began a two-year term of National Service, first joining the Suffolk Regiment and later transferring to the Royal Army Education Corps, where he served as a sergeant instructor both in Shorncliffe, Kent, and Münster, Westphalia (BAOR12), Germany. Having earlier been awarded a scholarship to the University of Cambridge in 1950, he matriculated at Queens' College, Cambridge in 1955 and studied natural sciences. In 1959, he established Polyhedron Services, a design and print company, which he developed for four years.

== Cambridge Consultants and other organisations ==
Dale met fellow students Tim Eiloart and David Southward at the University of Cambridge. With them, he established the research and development organisation Cambridge Consultants Ltd. He joined Cambridge Consultants full-time in 1963, heading several design projects before ultimately assuming the role of the organisation's personnel and training manager. His 1979 book From Ram Yard to Milton Hilton chronicles the organisation's background, founding, and first two decades. An update was released in 1981 to mark the move of the company from Bar Hill to the Cambridge Science Park, and a 2010 revision titled From Ram Yard to Milton Hilton: Cambridge Consultants – The Early Years, was published for the company's 50th anniversary.

Dale served as a trustee of the non-profit Centre for Computing History in Cambridge and the Cambridgeshire Farmland Museum. He was involved in organising the museum's move to the A10 at Waterbeach from its original site in Haddenham, Cambridgeshire. He was a Magistrate on the Cambridge City Bench from 1977 to 1984 and was a past member of both Bar Hill and Haddenham Parish Councils.

== Writing and publishing ==
In parallel with his work at Cambridge Consultants, Dale developed his career as an author, writing a series of articles on new technology for The Engineer as well as the first biography of artist–illustrator Louis Wain. Louis Wain: The Man Who Drew Cats (1968; republished in 1991 and 2000) renewed national interest in Wain and led to an exhibition of his works, which Dale helped to organise, at the Victoria & Albert Museum (London) in December 1972.

Dale left Cambridge Consultants in 1976 to become a full-time writer, both of books and commercial literature. Among the books he wrote during this period were The Manna Machine (1978) and The Kaballah Decoded (1978), both co-authored with the linguist George Sassoon. He also wrote The World of Jazz (1980) and The Sinclair Story (1985), a biography of the entrepreneur Sir Clive Sinclair.

In the mid-1970s, Dale began collecting apocryphal anecdotes, which at the time were sometimes termed "whale-tumour stories," now more commonly known as contemporary or urban legends. This resulted in the publication of The Tumour in the Whale: A Collection of Modern Myths (1978), the first popular compilation of and commentary on contemporary or urban legends. American folklorist Jan Brunvand has described this as "a landmark work". In 1976, Dale coined the word "foaf" (for "friend of a friend") to describe apocryphal narratives involving someone at some distance from the teller. He used this word in The Tumour in the Whale to signify that an anecdote in question "has been reported from several quarters, that its provenance is shady, [and] that it is almost certainly a whale-tumour story". In recognition of this concept, the ISCLR in 1985 named its quarterly newsletter FoafTale News. "Foaf" was added to the Oxford English Dictionary in 2009. Dale continued his work on contemporary legends with the publications of It's True ... It Happened to a Friend: A Collection of Urban Legends (1984) and The Wordsworth Book of Urban Legend: Tall Tales for Our Times (2005).

In 1984, Dale co-founded Business Literature Services Ltd. (now known as Flag Communication Ltd.), a publishing house devoted to business-related writing. He then founded Fern House Publishing in 1990. Between 1992 and 1994, Dale served as series editor and writer for eight Discoveries & Inventions books for the British Library. He wrote three novels: About Time (1995), The Secret World of Zoë Golding (2010), and The New Life of Hannah Brooks (2013), and he held performances of a one-man show called "Hello, Mrs Fish."

Dale died in Cottenham, Cambridgeshire on 29 March 2020, at the age of 86.

== Published works ==
- Louis Wain – The Man Who Drew Cats, 1968 (William Kimber)
- Bridges, 1973 (Colourmaster Junior Series)
- Inland Waterways, 1974 (Colourmaster Junior Series)
- Iron Roads, 1974 (Colourmaster Junior Series)
- Catland, 1977 (Duckworth)
- The Kabbalah Decoded, 1978 (With George Sassoon; Duckworth)
- The Manna Machine, 1978 (With George Sassoon; Sidgwick & Jackson)
- The Tumour in the Whale: A Collection of Modern Myths, 1978 (Duckworth, W.H. Allen)
- BASIC Programming, 1979 (With Ian Williamson & Tim Eiloart; Cambridge Learning Enterprises)
- Die Manna Maschine, 1979 (With George Sassoon, a German translation of The Manna Machine; Moewig Verlag)
- Edwardian Inventions 1901–1905, 1979 (With Joan Gray; W.H. Allen)
- From Ram Yard to Milton Hilton, 1979 (Cambridge Consultants Ltd.)
- Hobsons Engineering Casebook, 1979 (editor; Hobsons)
- Hobsons Computing Casebook, 1980 (editor; Hobsons)
- The Manna Machine, 1980 (With George Sassoon; Panther)
- The Myth of the Micro, 1980 (With Ian Williamson; Star)
- The World of Jazz, 1980 (Phaidon)
- Understanding Microprocessors with the Science of Cambridge MK-14, 1980 (With Ian Williamson; Macmillan)
- From Ram Yard to Milton Hilton: A History of Cambridge Consultants, 1982 (Cambridge Consultants Ltd.)
- A Career in Architecture, 1983 (With Julian Marsh; RIBA)
- A History of Jazz, 1983 (Jade Books)
- It's True ... It Happened to a Friend, 1984 (Duckworth)
- Der är sant ... en god vän berättade, 1985 (A Swedish translation of It's True ... It Happened to a Friend; Mimer)
- Hobsons 6th Form Casebook, 1985 (editor; Hobsons)
- The Sinclair Story, 1985 (Duckworth)
- Walter Wilson – Portrait of an Inventor, 1986 (SCG, Duckworth)
- Understanding AIDS, 1988 (With John Starkie; Hodder & Stoughton)
- Louis Wain – The Man Who Drew Cats, 1991 (Chris Beetles & Michael O'Mara)
- Machines in the Home, 1992 (With Rebecca Weaver; The British Library)
- The Industrial Revolution, 1992 (With Henry Dale; The British Library)
- Timekeeping, 1992 (The British Library)
- Early Cars, 1994 (The British Library)
- Early Railways, 1994 (The British Library)
- Home Entertainment, 1994 (With Rebecca Weaver; The British Library)
- Machines in the Office, 1994 (With Rebecca Weaver; The British Library)
- About Time, 1995 (Fern House Publishing)
- The Fern House Design & Technology Pack, 1995 (With Cyndy Fiddy; Fern House Publishing)
- Catland, 1995 (The Promotional Reprint Company)
- Maszyna do produkcji manny, 1996 (With George Sassoon; Amber)
- A Dictionary of Abbreviations & Acronyms, 1997, 1999, 2001 (With Steve Puttick; Wordsworth Editions)
- Cats in Books – A Celebration of Cat Illustrations through the Ages, 1997 (The British Library, Abrams)
- Teach Yourself Jazz, 1997, 2004 (Hodder Educational)
- Cats in Books, 1998 (Nakano Museum Books Ltd, Japan)
- Halcyon Days – Recollections of Post-War Vintage Motoring, 1999 (Fern House Publishing)
- The Wordsworth Dictionary of Culinary and Menu Terms, 2000 (Wordsworth Editions)
- Haddenham & Aldreth Past and Present, 2000 (Fern House Publishing)
- Puss in Boots, 2001 (Fern House Publishing)
- A Treasury of Essential Proverbs, 2003 (BookBlocks – CRW Publishing)
- A Treasury of Love Poems, 2003 (BookBlocks – CRW Publishing)
- The Book of WHAT?, 2004 (CRW Publishing)
- The Book of WHEN?, 2004 (CRW Publishing)
- The Book of WHERE?, 2004 (CRW Publishing)
- The Book of WHO?, 2004 (CRW Publishing)
- The Wordsworth Book of Urban Legend, 2005 (Wordsworth Editions)
- Dickens Dictionary, 2006 (Wordsworth Editions)
- Sayings Usual & Unusual, 2007 (Wordsworth Reference Series)
- Cats in Books, 2008 (British Library Publications)
- From Ram Yard to Milton Hilton: Cambridge Consultants – The Early Years, 2010 (Fern House Publishing)
- The Secret World of Zoë Golding, 2010 (Pen name, Jane MacGowan; Fern House Publishing)
- The New Life of Hannah Brooks, 2013 (Fern House Publishing)
- Get Started in Jazz, 2014 (Teach Yourself)
