= Murders of Patricia Mann and Jesse McBane =

Unsolved murders in 1971 in North Carolina

Patricia Ann Mann
- Born: February 6, 1951; Sanford, Lee County, North Carolina
- Disappeared: February 12, 1971 (aged 20); Croasdaile, Durham, North Carolina
- Died: February 13, 1971 (aged 20); Duke Forest, Orange County, North Carolina
- Cause of death: Ligature strangulation and stabbing
- Body discovered: Duke Forest, Orange County, North Carolina
- Burial place: Cool Springs Baptist Cemetery, Sanford, Lee County, North Carolina, USA
- Education: Watts Hospital
- Occupation: Nursing student
- Partner: Jesse McBane
- Parent(s): Leila Mae Mann (mother); William Mann Sr. (father)
- Relatives: William Mann Jr. (brother); Susan Faye Mann (sister); George Mann (brother); Carolyn Spivey (cousin); David Spivey (cousin-in-law)
- Website: podcasts.apple.com/us/podcast/the-long-dance-podcast/id1401500880

Jesse Allen McBane
- Born: February 15, 1952; Chatham County, North Carolina
- Disappeared: February 12, 1971 (aged 18); Croasdaile, Durham, North Carolina
- Died: February 13, 1971 (aged 18); Duke Forest, Orange County, North Carolina
- Cause of death: Ligature strangulation and stabbing
- Body discovered: Duke Forest, Orange County, North Carolina
- Burial place: Mount Olive Baptist Church Cemetery, Alamance County, North Carolina, USA
- Education: North Carolina State University
- Occupation: College athlete
- Partner: Patricia Mann
- Parents: Allen McBane (father); Hilda Mae McBane (mother)
- Website: podcasts.apple.com/us/podcast/the-long-dance-podcast/id1401500880

On February 12, 1971, Patricia Ann Mann, age 20 and Jesse Allen McBane, age 18, were found brutally murdered in the woods of Orange County, North Carolina. The murders, known as "The Valentine's Day Murders", have to this day never been solved. Police have permanently reopened the investigation since 2011.

== Victims ==
Patricia Ann Mann, the youngest of four children, was a nursing student from Sanford, doing her residential training at Watts Hospital in Durham. Jesse Allen McBane was a North Carolina State University athletic student from Pittsboro in his freshman year. The couple started dating in high school and got engaged in the weeks before the murders.

== Murder ==
On February 12, 1971, Mann and McBane left a Valentine's Day dance they attended together at Watts Hospital. Mann, accompanied by McBane, signed out of her dorm and planned to return by curfew. Their families and Mann's roommates went to police when they didn't return that night. On February 16, McBane's friend found the car the couple left in at a lover's lane at Wayside Place. Two coats and Mann's folded pantyhose were found inside the car.

On February 24, a surveyor in Duke Woods, three miles away from the lane, found Mann and McBane dead, tied to a tree and covered in leaves and debris. Their causes of death were determined to be asphyxiation from ropes being repeatedly tightened and released around each of their necks. Mud on their shoes indicated they were alive for the extent of the violence, which was estimated to have lasted some hours before the couple died. Examinations also revealed that had multiple stab wounds to their chests which were postmortem, and Mann's liver was ruptured from what was determined to be a punch to her stomach.

== Investigation and legacy ==
In 1971, Tim Bowers of the Durham Police Department solicited New York criminal psychologist Dr. James Brussel to create a profile of the killer. Multiple agencies became involved in the case, including the Orange County Sheriff's Office, Durham Sheriff's Office, The North Carolina State Bureau of Investigation, and the North Carolina Department of Motor Vehicles. The case soon went cold in part due to difficulties in collaborative efforts between the agencies, according to statements made by the Orange County Sherriff's Office in 2018.

In 1972 another couple was attacked by a gunman who tried to kidnap them Duke Forest by forcing them into the trunk of his car. The man fought the attacker, who pistol-whipped him and left him with lasting nerve damage. The couple escaped and the assailant fled. A composite sketch of the suspect was developed.

Between 2011 and 2018 the Orange County Sherriff's office kept the case open. The department attempted to collect DNA from crime scene evidence available, but no viable samples for testing against suspects were recovered.

In 2018, writer and filmmaker Eryk Pruitt and journalist Drew Adamack collaborated to release the podcast The Long Dance on June 30, which focuses on the lives of Mann and McBane, as well as the timelines and investigations surrounding their murders. Pruitt has also released a thriller novel, Something Bad Wrong, which is a fictionalized story inspired by the murders of Mann and McBane.
