= Clarence Hill (serial killer) =

American serial killer (1910–1973)

- Hill, c. 1943–44
- Born: November 10, 1910; Atlanta, Georgia, U.S.
- Died: July 10, 1973 (aged 62); Trenton, New Jersey, U.S.
- Other names: "Mad Killer of Duck Island" "Moon-Mad Murderer"
- Conviction: First degree murder
- Penalty: Life imprisonment

Details
- Victims: 6 murdered; 12 total
- Span of crimes: 1938–1942
- Country: United States
- States: New Jersey; Pennsylvania
- Date apprehended: December 29, 1943

Clarence Hill (November 10, 1910 – July 10, 1973) was an American serial killer who attacked couples at lovers' lanes in Duck Island, New Jersey, and the surrounding area between 1938 and 1942.

In 1944, he was convicted of first degree murder and sentenced to life in prison. A model inmate, he was released from prison on health grounds in 1964 and died of throat cancer in 1973.

== Personal life ==
Hill was born on November 10, 1910, in Atlanta, Georgia. A former Sunday school teacher, he fathered two children. Hill was drafted into the Army on March 12, 1943.

== Duck Island murders ==
Crime scene photo from the Tonzillo–Myatovich murders

On the night of November 8, 1938, 20-year-old Vincenzo "Jim" Tonzillo and 16-year-old Mary Myatovich (Note: Several contemporary sources claimed that she was 15 or spelled her surname as "Mytovich".) were parked at a lovers' lane on the remote Duck Island when they were ambushed by a "short, stocky colored man" armed with a 12-gauge shotgun. The man demanded money, and when Tonzillo refused, he was shot dead. After Myatovich fled from the vehicle, she was shot in the lower body, chased down, and raped. Following reports of screams, police arrived and took Myatovich to the hospital. She survived long enough to tell details of what had occurred but succumbed to her injuries the following day. Initially, police were skeptical of her story, as Tonzillo was a married man having an affair with Myatovich.

On October 1, 1939, a junk collector found a woman's prosthetic leg protruding from a pile of garbage on Duck Island. Nearby, he found a car containing the body of 28-year-old mechanic Frank J. Kasper, who had died from shotgun blasts to the head and neck the previous night. The woman was identified as 36-year-old Katherine Werner, whose body was discovered not far from the vehicle. As her skull was crushed, it was determined that she was beaten to death as she attempted to run away. Similar to the first murders, Kasper and Werner were out on their spouses. Both Kasper's wife and Werner's husband had "airtight alibis".

After news spread about the murders on Duck Island, couples began parking elsewhere in the surrounding area. In the following year, two more incidents occurred in which couples were approached by a Black man armed with a shotgun, but only 19-year-old Howard Wilson sustained injuries from a shot to the arm.

The final murders occurred in Hamilton Township on November 16, 1940, when 35-year-old Ludovicum J. Kovacs and 27-year-old Caroline Moriconi were found dead in their car parked in a wooded area off Cypress Lane. The couple, who were also involved in an affair, died from shotgun blasts.

The last attack came on March 7, 1942, near Morrisville, Pennsylvania, when 25-year-old John Testa and 21-year-old Antoinette Marcantonio were robbed of $9.30 and shot at while in their car. After fleeing, they were chased down and beaten with the stock of a shotgun. The couple managed to get away and turned in to police a part of the broken-off stock containing a partial serial number.

== Arrest, trial, and imprisonment ==
After a lengthy investigation, the serial number of the shotgun was traced back to Hill. On December 29, 1943, he was arrested at an Army camp in Moultrieville, South Carolina, and then transferred to Fort Dix and charged with six counts of murder.

Hill maintained his innocence and claimed on the stand that his confession was beaten out of him. However, doctors looking into the alleged beatings were conflicted, and it was ruled that his typewritten confession was not done under duress. On December 29, 1944, exactly one year after his arrest, Hill was found guilty of first degree murder. After the jury recommended mercy, he received a life sentence.

== Release ==
On April 19, 1964, Hill, at this point a model prisoner suffering from throat cancer, was released on medical parole after serving 19 years. Pennsylvania requested an extradition to charge him with previous crimes he had allegedly committed, but the request was refused by New Jersey governor Richard J. Hughes.

In 1973, Hill died from cancer in Trenton, New Jersey, aged 62.

== See also ==
- Charles Barr
- Texarkana Moonlight Murders
- List of serial killers in the United States
