= Friend of a friend =

Human contact that exists because of a mutual friend

In sociology, a friend of a friend is a human contact that exists because of a mutual friend. Person C is a friend of a friend of person A when there is a person B that is a friend of both A and C. Thus the human relation "friend of a friend" is a compound relation among friends, similar to the uncle and aunt relations of kinship. Though friendship is a reciprocal relation, the relation of a friend of a friend may not be a friendship, though it holds potential for coalition building and dissemination of information.

== Balance theory ==
The tendency of a friend of a friend to become a friend was noted by Fritz Heider, though he also considered the possibility that one of the friendships might breakdown, according to balance theory, which his view of human triangles is called. According to Heider, the friend of a friend contact could be stressful enough to undermine one or another of the friendships. Extending the study of social dynamics caused by such friend-of-a-friend tensions to social networks beyond triangles, Dorwin Cartwright and Frank Harary used signed graphs to indicate positive or negative sentiments between persons. In 1963 Anatol Rapoport summarized the theory: "The hypothesis implies roughly that attitudes of the group members will change in such a way that one's friends' friends will tend to become one's friends, ..." In September 1975 Dartmouth College offered a symposium on these dynamics.

Bo Anderson made an analysis of the friend-of-a-friend relationship in connection with his criticism of balance theory.

We have all encountered cases in which somebody has said, "You should meet so-and-so", only to find that we have little in common with that person, even though he or she was introduced to us by a mutual friend...In some friendships the persons value the exclusiveness of their relationship and are therefore not likely to let others into it. Friends differ from acquaintances in that they are not merely slots in a grid of social network relationships, but are valued for their personal, unique qualities. Hence, when I relate to a friend of a friend, I need to know something about the perceptions and exchanges that make up this friendship. My reaction to my friend's friend (or spouse) may even be unfavorable, although I may also well understand and sympathize with my friend’s affection for her, given his needs, perceptions, interests and so on.

Considering friendship between people to be a binary relation, the connection to a friend of a friend is a composition of the relationship with itself. Composed relations are used to describe kinship, so it may be natural to apply composition to friendship. One consequence is that frequently a person's friends have more friends than him (the friendship paradox), which accents the reach of the compound connection. But the fact that friendship is not automatically a transitive relation produces some social dynamics.

== Other usage ==
In some social sciences, the phrase is used as a half-joking shorthand for the fact that much of the information on which people act comes from distant sources (as in "it happened to a friend of a friend of mine") and cannot be confirmed. It is probably best known from urban legend studies, where it was popularized by Jan Harold Brunvand. The acronym FOAF was coined by Rodney Dale and used in this context in his 1978 book The Tumour in the Whale: A Collection of Modern Myths.

== Other languages ==
- "Dúirt bean liom go ndúirt bean léi" (Irish proverb) – similar Irish language term literally meaning a woman told me that a woman told her that...
- "L'homme qui a vu l'homme qui a vu l'ours" (French proverb) – similar French language proverb literally meaning The man who saw the man who saw the bear, in which the bear is never seen, only heard of.
- "Un amigo me dijo que un amigo le dijo..." (Spanish proverb) – meaning literally A friend told me that a friend told him that...
- "Jedna paní povídala..." (Czech proverb) – similar Czech language proverb literally meaning One lady said...
- "Teman kepada teman saya..." Bahasa Indonesia; literally meaning friend of my friend.
- "Babaturana babaturan urang..." Basa Sunda; literally meaning friend of my friend. There is another version of this phrase in Sundanese language, "Babaturan dulur urang", which means "friend of my relatives".
- "카더라..." Korean; Gyeongsang dialect word literally meaning Who said that...
- "Diz-se que..." or "Dizem que..." Portuguese; literally meaning It is said that... or They say that...
- "Freundesfreund" German; literally meaning a friend's friend
- "Umgani womgani wami" IsiZulu language; meaning my friend's friend
- "朋友的朋友" or "我的friend的friend" Cantonese / Hong Kong English; meaning my friend's friend
- "Itshomi ye tshomi yam" isiXhosa language; meaning "friend of a friend"

== Web ontology language ==
In information science, an ontology describes categories, properties and relations between concepts, data and entities. The phrase "Friend Of A Friend", converted to the acronym FOAF, has been adopted in Web Ontology Language. It has been used in WebID for identifying correspondents, and to designate a secure authentication protocol.

== See also ==
- Composition of relations
- Interpersonal ties
- Six degrees of separation
