= Charles Barr =

American serial killer (1903–1926)

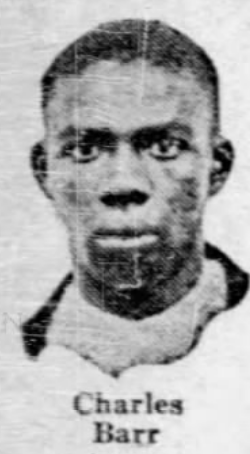
- Born: 1903; Memphis, Tennessee, U.S.
- Died: August 20, 1926 (aged 22–23); Tennessee State Prison, Tennessee, U.S.
- Other names: "The Petting Party Bandit" "The Black Panther"
- Status: Executed by electrocution
- Conviction: First degree murder
- Penalty: Death

Details
- Victims: 3
- Span of crimes: January – May 1923
- Country: United States
- State: Tennessee
- Date apprehended: July 1924

Charles Barr (1903 – August 20, 1926), known as The Petting Party Bandit, was an American serial killer who attacked couples at lovers' lanes in Memphis, Tennessee, from January to May 1923, killing three and wounding one. For his crimes, he was convicted, sentenced to death and subsequently executed at the Tennessee State Prison in 1926.

== Early life ==
Little is known about Barr's early life. He was born in Memphis in 1903, the only son of a Baptist minister. As an adult, he married a woman named Luada and the couple lived happily in the city, with Charles working as a chauffeur and house servant for the Van Fossan family, where he was treated decently and regarded as an honest worker. Despite his reputation, Barr wished for a more lavish lifestyle, believing the quickest way to do so was to turn to robberies.

== Murders ==
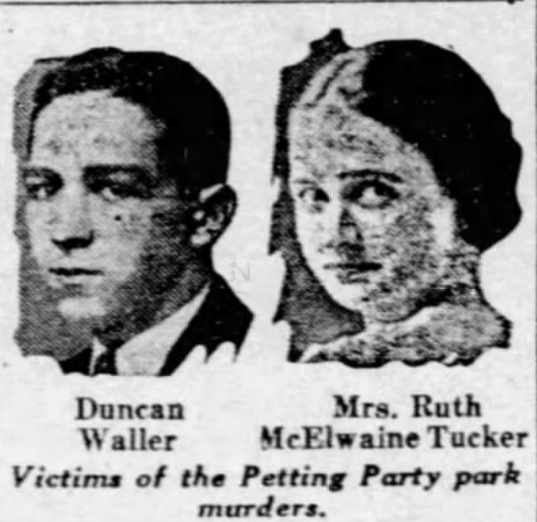
Duncan Waller and Ruth Tucker

On January 27, 1923, Barr borrowed a car from a friend and drove to an isolated road near Memphis, which was known as a local lovers' lane. There, he came across 19-year-old salesman Duncan Waller from Mayfield, Kentucky, and his mistress, Ruth McElwaine Tucker of Bowling Green. He parked the car near them and approached them on foot, and upon reaching the automobile, he pulled out a .25 caliber pistol and shot Waller, killing him instantly. Frightened, Tucker leaped out of the car and sprinted towards a nearby field, but Barr caught up with her, raped her and then shot her as well. After killing her, he stole the woman's jewelry and valuables before returning to the car and doing the same to Waller, and then fleeing the area. Their bodies were later discovered by a milkman doing his daily routine. Despite the police's and local citizen's detective agencies attempts to solve the case, nobody was arrested for the crime at the time.

Four months later, on May 29, Barr again borrowed the car and went to the same spot, where he found 27-year-old grocery store executive W. Obe Spencer and his date, schoolteacher Laura Wheaton Johnson, were talking to one another in the car. Barr again stealthily approached them, but was seen by Johnson, who began screaming. The assailant then immediately shot and killed Spencer, before proceeding to also shoot Johnson, who survived. Seeing that she was still alive, he took her hostage and forced her to give up her jewellery, planning to kill her in another secluded area. However, Johnson leapt out of the moving car and ran to the nearest house, explaining to the homeowner what had just happened. Alarmed, he brought her to the police station, where she reiterated what had happened, but was unable to provide an accurate description of the attacker.

== Arrest, trial and execution ==
While no further known murders were committed by the offender, then dubbed "The Petting Party Bandit", the cases caused a great stir in contemporary Memphis. Knowing that the offender had used a .25 caliber pistol in both attacks and the fact that he had stolen valuables from his victims, the detectives working on the case focused on tracking down the items. Nothing substantial emerged until July 1924, when Det. Sgt. John Long noticed that a local pawnbroker was selling a watch similar to the one lifted from Tucker's body. After examining the watch and questioning the pawnbroker, authorities learned that it had been pawned by Luoda Barr, the wife of a chauffeur currently employed by prominent Memphis politician E. H. Crump. In the span of days, authorities interrogated both her and Charles, in addition to searching their property, succeeding in finding the murder weapon in the trunk of Barr's car. Faced with mounting evidence, Barr admitted his guilt to the detectives and in a written letter that he was solely responsible for all three slayings.

The prosecutors announced that they would seek a death sentence for Barr, who refused to hire an attorney. As a result, public defenders Grover McCormick and his assistant Floyd Creasy were hired to represent him. While the trial was going on, it was suggested by some media outlets that Barr might have been responsible for two similar attacks that had occurred in the Memphis area: the October 27, 1922, attack on policeman Aubrey Thomas and his date Zelda Foster, in which the former was killed and the latter survived; and the January 1923 attack on DeWitt Sink and his fiancée Thelma Cunningham, in which Cunningham was severely wounded and had to be treated in hospital for several weeks. However, Barr himself denied culpability in these crimes, and no evidence proved his guilt in either case. In relation to the cases he was charged with, Laura Johnson, who was brought in to testify on behalf of the prosecution, positively identified a wristwatch found in the Barr household as the one her attacker had looted off Spencer's corpse.

Barr was only tried for killing Spencer. The trial was adjourned on October 23, due to the fact that Justice J. Edd Richards fell ill. As it resumed, the defense contended that Barr's confession should not be considered credible, as it was allegedly obtained under duress, a claim denied by the police department. On October 28, Barr was found guilty of first degree murder, and on November 6, he was sentenced to death. He subsequently appealed his sentence to the Tennessee Supreme Court, the Supreme Court of the United States and to then-Governor Austin Peay to commute his sentence, all of which were rejected. As a result, on August 20, 1926, he was executed by electric chair at the Tennessee State Prison. At the time, he was the 24th convict to have been executed in this manner since the state transitioned from the previous method of hanging.

== See also ==
- Capital punishment in Tennessee
- List of people executed in the United States in 1926
- List of serial killers in the United States
- Clarence Hill (serial killer)
