= Youell Swinney =

Sole suspect in the Texarkana Moonlight Murders

- Born: Youell Lee Swinney; February 9, 1917; Cleveland County, Arkansas, U.S.
- Died: September 15, 1994 (aged 77); Dallas, Texas, U.S.
- Known for: Sole suspect of Texarkana Phantom Killer
- Spouse: Peggy Swinney
- Criminal charges: Auto-theft
- Penalty: Life in prison (released, 1973)

Youell Lee Swinney (February 9, 1917 – September 15, 1994) was an American criminal and the only major suspect in the Phantom Killer case in Texarkana in 1946, although he was never officially charged with any of the murders.

== Life ==
Swinney grew up in rural Cleveland County, Arkansas, the son of a Baptist minister. Swinney was a known criminal with a history of counterfeiting and car theft. He was convicted of car theft in 1947 and as a repeat offender, he received life in prison. However, he was released from prison in 1973 following a habeas corpus proceeding which found that a prior conviction in 1941 used for sentence enhancement purposes was void because Swinney had not been represented by counsel.

== Suspected as the Phantom ==
Swinney was the only major suspect in the Phantom Killer case. He was linked to the crimes by detailed descriptions of the Booker-Martin murders from his wife and accomplice, Peggy, who refused to testify against him in court. Investigation into his involvement in the murders eventually faded. The case remains unsolved, and physical evidence is virtually nonexistent today. Swinney died in a Dallas nursing home in 1994.

Two of the lead investigators in the case, Max Tackett and Tillman Johnson, believed for the remainder of their lives that Swinney was guilty of the murders. A 2014 book, The Phantom Killer: Unlocking the Mystery of the Texarkana Serial Murders by Dr. James Presley claims that Swinney is the culprit of all five Phantom attacks.
