= They're Alive! =

They're Alive

Studio album by The Other
- Released: September 14, 2004
- Recorded: 2004
- Genre: Horror punk
- Label: Fiend Force Records

The Other chronology
They're Alive (2004)	We Are Who We Eat (2006)

They're Alive is the debut album of German horror punk band The Other, released in 2004. The cover art is inspired by classic horror film posters. At the bottom, it has an actor "starring" section for the band members: "Starring: Andy Only, Dr Caligari, Rod Usher, Sarge von Rock and.... The Creature" (in classic horror films, the Gill-man is commonly called "The Creature")

== Track listing ==
1. "Ripley 8"
2. "Army of Machines"
3. "Beware of Ghouls"
4. "Imp of the Perverse"
5. "Return of the Repressed"
6. "Down"
7. "Wolf"
8. "Dead Boys"
9. "Tarantula"
10. "Invasion"
11. "Hyde Inside"
12. "Arise Undead"
13. "666 Ways to Die"

=== Tracks cultural references ===
- 1. Ellen Ripley Clone 8, a character from the movie Alien Resurrection (1997) directed by Jean-Pierre Jeunet;
- 4. The Imp of the Perverse (1845), a short story by Edgar Allan Poe;
- 9. Tarantula (1955), an American black-and-white science fiction film directed by Jack Arnold;
- 11. Strange Case of Dr Jekyll and Mr Hyde (1886), a Scottish novella by Robert Louis Stevenson;

== Personnel ==
- Rod Usher (Vocals)
- Sarge von Rock (Guitar)
- Andy Only (Bass)
- Dr. Caligari (Drums)
