= The Radio Hacker's Codebook =

Book by George Sassoon

- front cover
- Author: George Sassoon
- Language: English
- Series: Duckworth Home Computing
- Publisher: Duckworth
- Publication date: 6 March 1986
- Publication place: England
- Media type: paperback
- Pages: 239
- ISBN: 0715620681
- Dewey Decimal: 621.384/2/0285416

The Radio Hacker's Codebook is a book for computer enthusiasts written by George Sassoon. The book explains how to receive international radioteletype signals, convert them with a circuit and then decode them on a microcomputer. In the case of this book the computer is the superseded Research Machines 380Z. Programs to do these functions are given, written in machine code and BASIC. However legal and moral issues relating to intercepting messages are not included. Other radioteletype subject included are the FEC and automatic repeat request used in maritime radiocommunications.

The book also include an exposition of encryption, including the public key RSA cipher and presciently expounds on the lack of privacy in the cashless society. Code examples are also given using the Sharp PC-320I to encode and decode the German Enigma machine. The books claims that the Enigma was kept secret for long periods because understanding it could compromise the American M-209 cipher machine, and that it was still being sold to other countries. Other encryption topics covered include Data Encryption Standard, Vernam cipher (one-time pad), pseudo random number generators, transposition ciphers, and substitution ciphers

The Radio Hacker's Codebook is idiosyncratic revealing a personal quest by Sassoon to decrypt military signals on the radio spectrum. However he would have had no chance to decode modern encryption as described in the book.

The Radio Hacker's Codebook broke ground in having a low price for a technical computing book being sold for £6.95 well below the typical £10+ price for computing books at the time. It was published by Duckworth and had 239 pages.
