= The Manna Machine =

1978 book by Sassoon and Dale

- First edition (publ. Sidgwick & Jackson)
- Author: George Sassoon, Rodney Dale
- Publication date: 1978
- ISBN: 0-283-98435-X

The Manna Machine is a 1978 book by George Sassoon and Rodney Dale, based upon a translation of the section of the Zohar called The Ancient of Days that concludes that a machine had created algae as food for human beings in biblical times.

== Overview ==
The machine was reproduced by Sassoon who was an engineer, who followed the directions given in The Ancient of Days and he claimed it created a food source of algae. This, he claims, explains how the Israelites survived their forty-year journey in the Sinai Desert. It is said by Sassoon and Dale that a nuclear reactor used to power the manna machine was stored within the Ark of the Covenant. The Ark was supposed to have powered the machine to run continuously, producing manna for six days and on the seventh day the machine would be taken apart for cleaning so it could run the following week. This is where the Sabbath, the holy day of rest, is thought to have originated. This knowledge was preserved within the Jewish Kabbalah that the authors claim to have correctly decoded. To support this claim, their translation is explained by Sassoon and Dale in a companion work titled The Kabbalah Decoded; A new Translation of the Ancient of Days Texts of the Zohar.
