= George Sassoon =

British scientist (1936-2006)

George Thornycroft Sassoon (30 October 1936 – 8 March 2006) was a British scientist, electronic engineer, linguist, translator and author.

== Early life ==
Sassoon was the only child of the poet Siegfried Sassoon and his wife Hester Gatty, who were living mainly at Heytesbury House in Wiltshire, but was born in Westminster, where his parents had rented a house to be close to specialist help. He was christened at St Martin-in-the-Fields by Dick Sheppard. His middle name was in honour of the family of his grandmother, Theresa Thornycroft.

Siegfried Sassoon wrote playfully to Max Beerbohm in November 1936: "Will he, I wonder, become Prime Minister, Poet Laureate, Archbishop of Canterbury, or merely Editor of The Times Literary Supplement? Or Master of the Quorn? Or merely Squire of Heytesbury?"

In 1947, Sassoon's parents separated, and he thereafter spent much of his childhood with his mother on the Scottish island of Mull. He was educated at Greenways Preparatory School at Ashton Gifford House, near Codford in Wiltshire, then at Oundle School and King's College, Cambridge.

== Career ==
Sassoon investigated extraterrestrial phenomena and helped his mother run a sheep farm on Mull. Between 1978 and 1980, he published three books, two of which were about his theories on extraterrestrial visitations, and also spoke at conferences on alien phenomena.

== Personal life ==
After his father died in 1967, Sassoon inherited and occupied his father's large country house, Heytesbury House at Heytesbury, Wiltshire. He found it much neglected and worked to restore it, and also battled unsuccessfully to stop a planned A36 bypass from going through the park of the house; in the process, he sold many of his father's papers to raise additional funds. The southern part of the park was subject to a compulsory purchase order in 1985 to allow construction of the bypass, separating the house from its cricket field and requiring a new entrance to be made from the west. He sold the house in 1994 following substantial losses at Lloyds of London and moved to a smaller property in the nearby village of Sutton Veny, but spent part of the year on Mull, where he had inherited his mother's property Ben Buie on her death in 1973.

Sassoon married four times: Stephanie Munro, at Inverness in 1955 (dissolved 1961); Marguerite Dicks in 1961 (dissolved 1974); Susan Christian-Howard in 1975 (dissolved 1982); and lastly, Alison Pulvertaft in 1994.

Sassoon's daughter by his first marriage, Kendall Sassoon, was born in 1961 shortly after her parents separated. She was the Patron-in-Chief of the Siegfried Sassoon Fellowship.

Sassoon's daughter and son by his third marriage, Isobel (born 1976) and Thomas (born 1978), were both killed in a road accident in Mendip, Somerset, in 1996, on the way home to Frome from a music festival. The car in which they were passengers crashed head on into a van, and six people died.

Sassoon was something of a bon-vivant, well known among other things for his playing of the piano-accordion. Among his other interests were languages, the Antipodes, and amateur radio, where his call-sign was GM3JZK.

== Death ==
Sassoon died aged 69 of cancer in Wiltshire in 2006.

== Selected publications ==
- "The Asimov Effect" in Science Fiction Analog, November 1976
- The Manna-Machine (1978)
- The Kabbalah Decoded (1978)
- The Radio Hacker's Codebook, Duckworth, London. ISBN 0-7156-2068-1 (1986)
