= The Other (band) =

German horror punk band

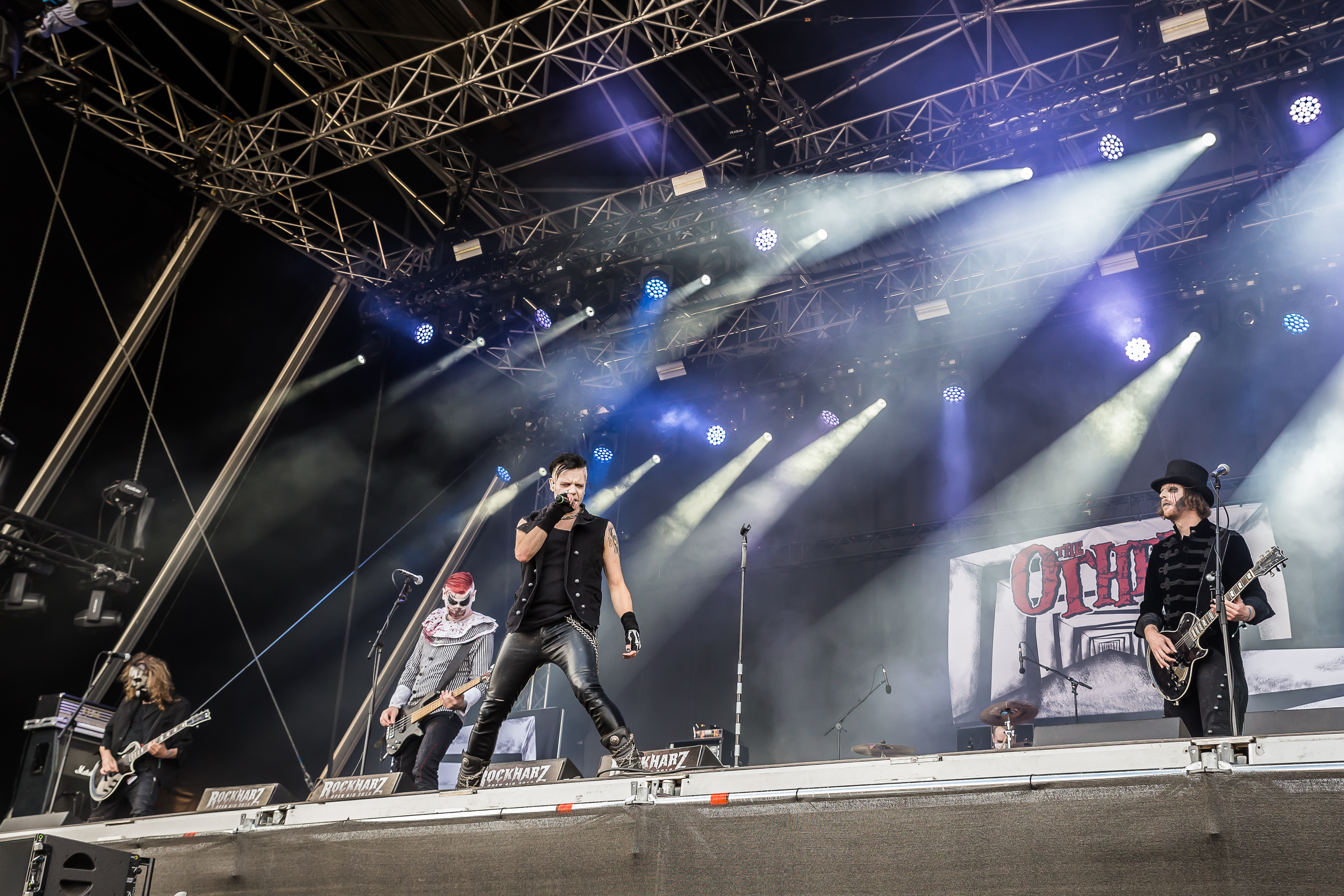
- The Other at Rockharz Open Air 2018

Background information
- Origin: Cologne, Germany
- Genres: Horror punk
- Years active: 2003–present
- Labels: Fiend Force, Steamhammer
- Members: Rod Usher; Dr. Caligari; Pat Laveau; Ben Crowe; Aaron Torn
- Past members: Jack Saw, Sarge von Rock, Chris Cranium, Viktor Sharp, Migore Drake, Andy Only
- Website: theother.de

The Other (or TheOther) is a German horror punk band formed in Cologne in 2002. The band's music style blends elements of punk rock and heavy metal, with lyrics and stage costumes inspired by horror fiction and films. Although most of their material is in English, they also write and perform songs in German.

== History ==
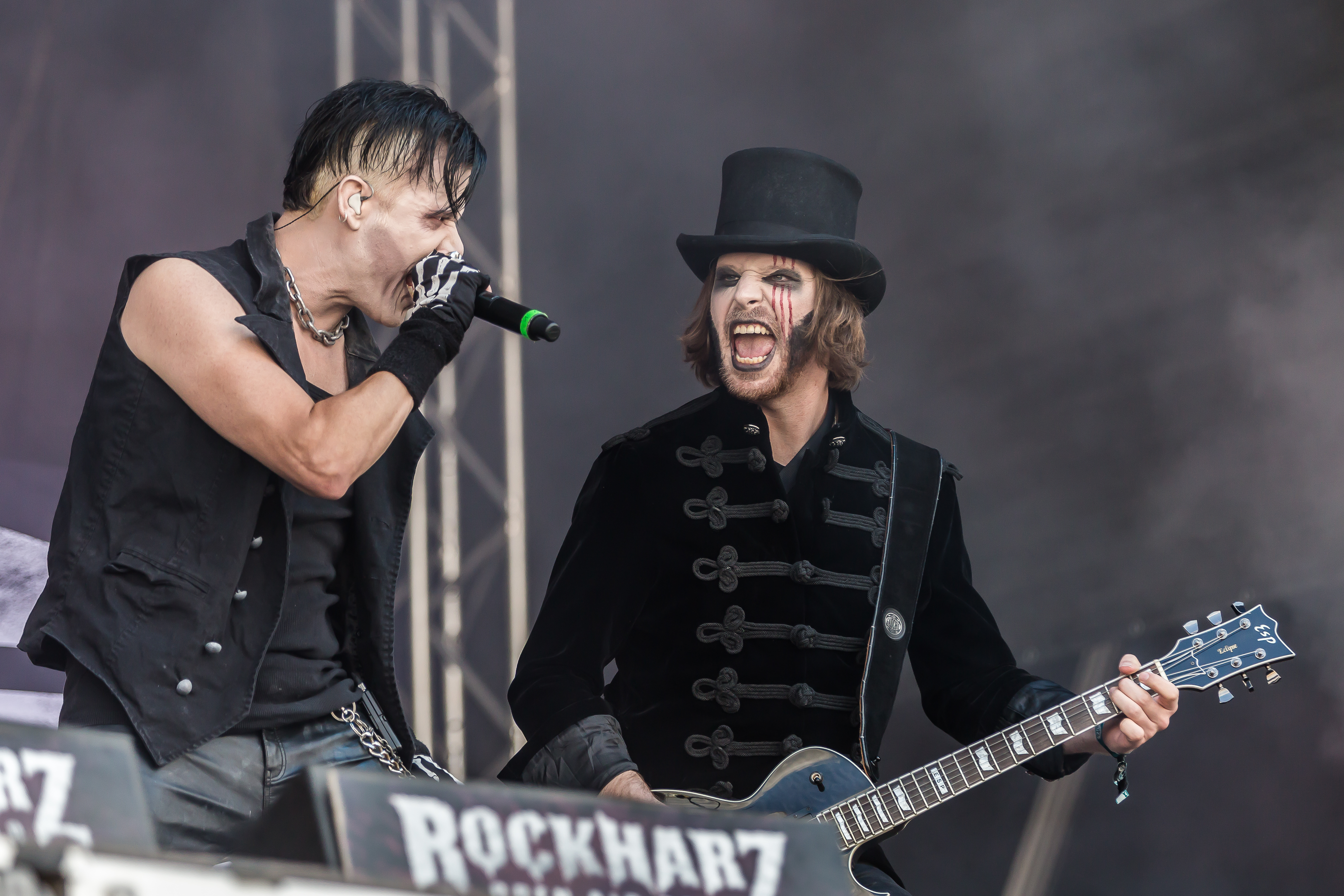
Singer Rod Usher and Guitarist Ben Crowe at Rockharz 2018

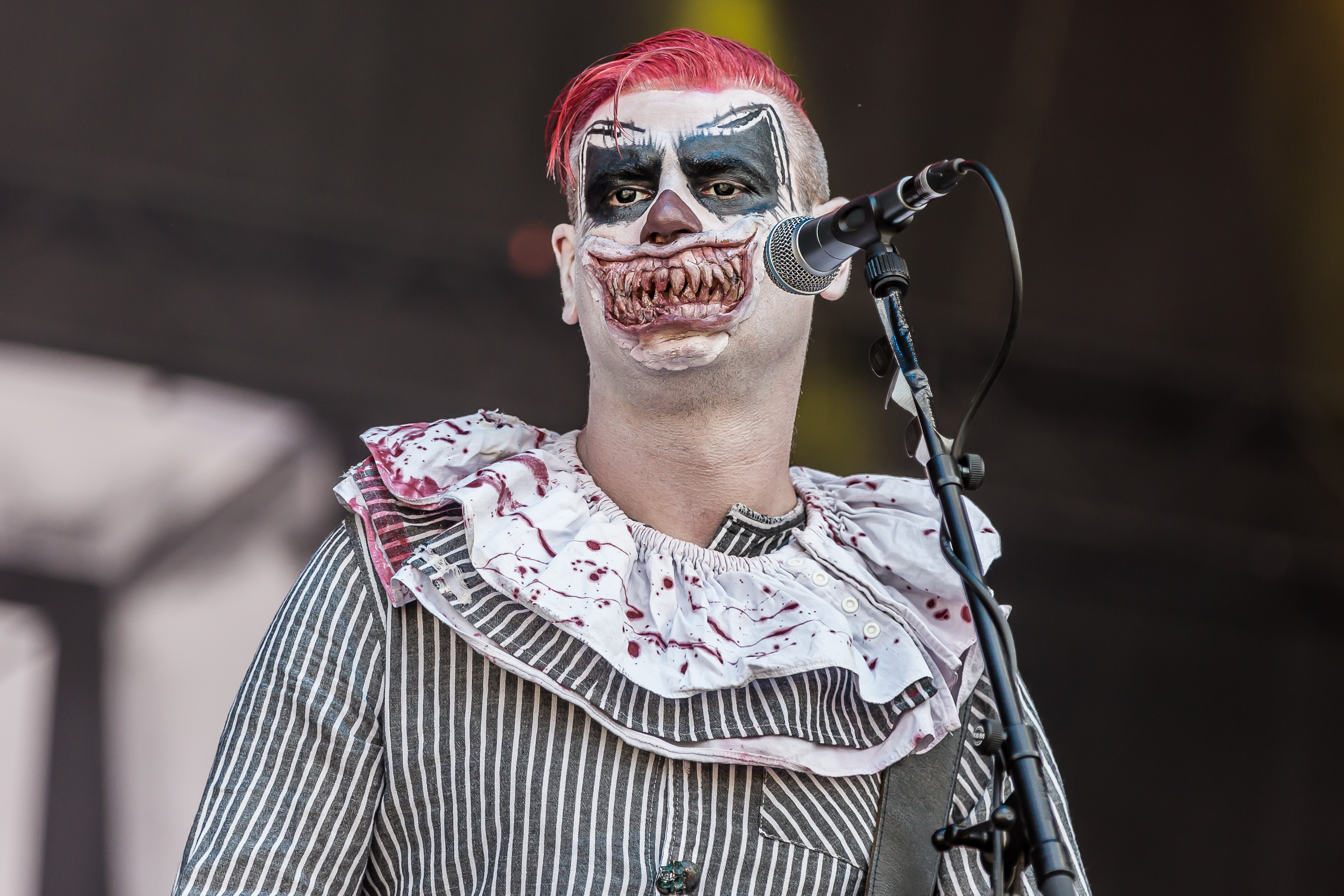
Former Bassist Chris Cranium at Rockharz 2018

The Other began as a Misfits cover band. They released their first album, They're Alive!, in 2004 with a cover art inspired by classic horror film posters that has an actor "starring" section for the band members: "STARRING: Andy Only, Dr Caligari, Rod Usher, Sarge von Rock and.... The Creature".

Their first official music video "Lover's Lane" was a subject of controversy in Germany because it was featuring German porn star Leonie Saint.

In 2007, The Other published their first comic book: Tales of the Other (Comicheft, Weissblech-Verlag). Most of the band's albums were released on the group member's own record label, Fiend Force Records, but they recorded "New Blood" (2010) with rock label SPV/Steamhammer.

Many influential horror punk artists like Blitzkid, Bloodsucking Zombies from Outer Space, Mister Monster, The Crimson Ghosts, Nim Vind, Rezurex or The Deep Eynde released albums through The Other's independent label Fiend Force Records .

=== Tours and live performances ===
The Other toured with famous bands like British punk rock pioneers The Damned, The Cult, Alice Cooper, the Misfits, The 69 Eyes, Balzac and Wednesday 13. In 2015, they toured in the United Kingdom with British horror punk/metal groups Al B. Damned and Lupen Tooth as well as German groups like Die Ärzte or Dr. Hell.

Throughout the years, The Other was part of numerous alternative/punk/heavy metal Festivals and events in Europe like the Wacken Open Air, the M'era Luna Festival, the Summer Breeze Open Air, Force Attack, the Wave-Gotik-Treffen, Endless Summer, the Ruhrpott Rodeo, the Fangoria's Weekend of Horrors, the Amphi Festival and The Travelling Morgue Horror Fest

=== Lifestyle and influences ===
The Other's songwriting, musical style, and performances are strongly influenced by classic horror movies and literature.

Among the actors and films that influenced the band lyrics and lifestyle (Gothic fashion, makeup), lead vocalist Rod Usher mentions: Bela Lugosi in Mark of the Vampire, Vincent Price in Andre DeToth's House of Wax (1953), Klaus Kinski in Werner Herzog's Nosferatu the Vampyre (1979) and Christopher Lee in Terence Fisher's Dracula (1958), Jack Arnold's Creature from the Black Lagoon (1954), Tarantula (1955) and more recently Alexandre Aja's Haute Tension (2003).

== Band members ==
=== Current ===
- Rod Usher – vocals (2002–present)
- Dr. Caligari – drums (2002–present)
- Ben Crowe – guitar (2013–present)
- Pat Laveau – guitar (2014–present)
- Aaron Torn – bass (2014–2016, 2019–present)

=== Former ===
- Chris Cranium – bass (2016–2019)
- Jack Saw – guitar (2013–2014)
- Sarge von Rock – guitar (2002–2013)
- Viktor Sharp – bass (2010–2014)
- Migore Drake – bass (2006–2010)
- Andy Only – bass (2002–2006)

== Discography ==
Studio albums

Year	Album	Label
2004	They're Alive!	Fiend Force Records
2006	We Are Who We Eat	Fiend Force Records
2007	Tales of the Other: The Comic	Fiend Force Records
2008	The Place to Bleed	Fiend Force Records
2010	New Blood	Steamhammer
2012	The Devils You know	Steamhammer
2015	Fear Itself	Steamhammer
2017	Casket Case	Drakkar
2020	Haunted	Drakkar
2025	Alienated	Massacre Records
