= We Are Who We Eat =

Studio album by The Other
- Released: 13 April 2006
- Recorded: 2006
- Genre: Horror punk
- Label: Fiend Force Records

The Other chronology
They're Alive (2004)	We Are Who We Eat (2006)

We Are Who We Eat is the second album of the German Horror punk band The Other. This was their last album with Andy Only, who left the band in December of the same year, as bassist.

== Track listing ==
1. "Passion for the Kill"
2. "In the Dead of Night"
3. "Last Man on Earth"
4. "Lover's Lane"
5. "Hallow's Eve"
6. "This is not an Exit"
7. "Menage a Mort"
8. "We are the Other Ones"
9. "Shadows from the Past"
10. "Ghosts of Hollywood"
11. "Monster Bride"
12. "Ode to Darkness"
13. "Horror Night"

== Personnel ==
- Rod Usher (Vocals)
- Sarge von Rock (Guitar)
- Andy Only (Bass)
- Dr. Caligari (Drums)
