= Texarkana Moonlight Murders =

Unsolved 1946 serial murders in Texarkana, United States

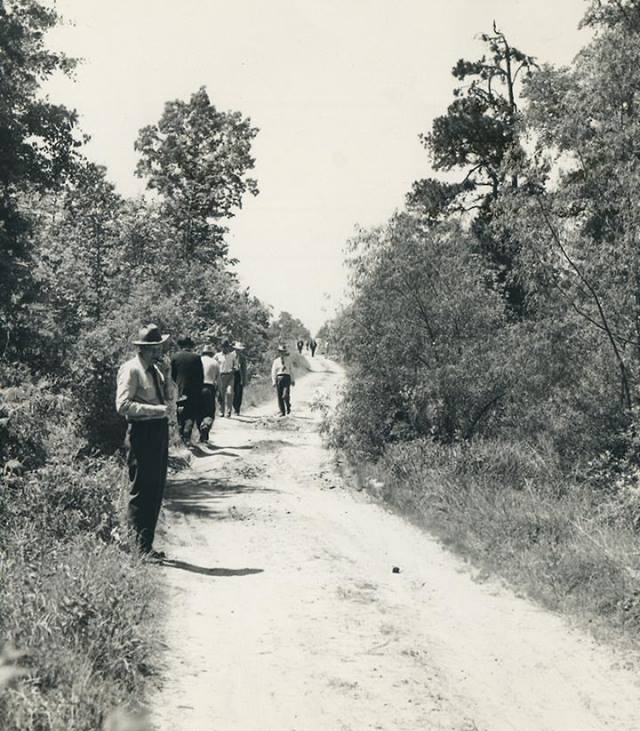
- Officers searching for clues down Morris Lane in 1946
- Location: Miller County, Arkansas, and Bowie County, Texas, U.S.
- Date: February 22 – May 3, 1946 (10 week period)
- Weapons: .32 pistol; .22 rifle
- Deaths: 5
- Victims: 8
- Perpetrator: Unidentified

The Texarkana Moonlight Murders, a term coined by the contemporary press, was a series of four unsolved serial murders and related violent crimes committed in the Texarkana region of the United States in early 1946. They were attributed to an alleged unidentified perpetrator known as the Phantom of Texarkana, the Phantom Killer, or the Phantom Slayer. This hypothetical suspect is credited with attacking eight people, five of them fatally, in a ten-week period.

The attacks occurred at night on weekends between February 22 and May 3, targeting couples. The first three attacks occurred at lovers' lanes or quiet stretches of road in Texas; the fourth attack occurred at an isolated farmhouse in Arkansas. The murders were reported nationally and internationally by several publications, and caused a state of panic in Texarkana throughout the summer. Residents armed themselves and, at dusk, locked themselves indoors while police patrolled the streets and neighborhoods. Stores sold out of guns, ammunition, locks, and many other protective devices. Investigations into the murders were conducted at the city, county, state, and federal level.

The prime suspect in the case, career criminal Youell Swinney, was linked to the murders primarily by statements from his wife plus additional circumstantial evidence. After Swinney's wife refused to testify against him, prosecutors decided against pursuing murder charges. Swinney was convicted on other charges and sentenced to a long prison sentence. Two of the lead investigators believed Swinney to be guilty of the murders. The book The Phantom Killer: Unlocking the Mystery of the Texarkana Serial Murders (2014), written by James Presley (nephew of Sheriff William Hardy "Bill" Presley), concludes that Swinney is the culprit. The events inspired many works, including the 1976 film The Town That Dreaded Sundown. This film is the basis for much of the subsequent myth and folklore around the murders.

== Crimes ==
The Texarkana Moonlight Murders consisted of four violent attacks which occurred over ten weeks from February to May 1946. The murders occurred in and around Texarkana, twin cities at the border of Miller County, Arkansas, and Bowie County, Texas. All four attacks targeted couples in isolated locations, on weekend nights. The attacks took place at intervals of three to four weeks. Investigators speculated that the attacks were the work of an unidentified serial killer. Over time, there have been shifting opinions by officials over whether the first and fourth attacks were committed by the same perpetrator.

=== February 22: First attack ===
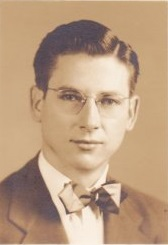
Jimmy Hollis

At around 11:45 p.m. on Friday, February 22, Jimmy Hollis (25) and his girlfriend, Mary Jeanne Larey (19), parked on a secluded road just outside Texarkana, Texas, after having seen a movie together. The lovers' lane was approximately 300 feet (91 m) from the last row of city homes, where present-day Central Mall is located. Around ten minutes later, a man wearing a white cloth mask–which resembled a pillowcase with eyeholes cut out–appeared at Hollis' driver-side door and shone a flashlight in the window. Hollis told him he had the wrong person, to which the man responded: "I don't want to kill you, fellow, so do what I say."

Both Hollis and Larey were ordered out of the car, and the man ordered Hollis to "take off [his] goddamn britches." After he complied, the man struck him twice upon the head with a firearm. Larey later told investigators that the noise was so loud she had initially thought Hollis had been shot, when in fact she had heard his skull fracturing. Thinking the assailant wanted to rob them, Larey showed him Hollis' wallet to prove he had no money, after which she was struck with a blunt object. The assailant ordered Larey to stand, and when she did, told her to run. Initially, Larey tried to flee toward a ditch, but the assailant ordered her to run up the road.

Larey spotted an old car parked off the road but found it empty, and was again confronted by the attacker, who asked her why she was running. When she said that he had told her to do so, he called her a liar before knocking her down and sexually assaulting her with the barrel of his gun. After the assault, Larey fled on foot, running a half-mile (800m) to a nearby house; she woke the inhabitants and phoned the police. Meanwhile, Hollis had regained consciousness and alerted a passing motorist, who also called the police. Within thirty minutes, Bowie County Sheriff W. H. "Bill" Presley and three other officers arrived at the scene, but the assailant had already left. Larey was hospitalized overnight for a minor head wound. Hollis was hospitalized for several days to recover from multiple skull fractures.

Hollis and Larey gave slightly differing descriptions of their attacker: Larey claimed that she could see under the mask that he was a light-skinned African-American male. Hollis alternately claimed the attacker was a tanned white man, and around thirty years old, but conceded he could not distinguish his features as he had been blinded by a flashlight. Both agreed that the assailant was around 6 feet (1.8 m) tall. Law enforcement repeatedly challenged Larey's account, and believed that she and Hollis knew the identity of their attacker and were covering for him.

=== March 24: First double-murder ===
Richard Griffin (29) and his girlfriend of six weeks, Polly Ann Moore (17), were found dead in Griffin's car on the morning of Sunday, March 24, by a passing motorist. The motorist saw the parked car on a lovers' lane 100 yards (91 m) south of US Highway 67 West in Bowie County. Griffin was found between the front seats on his knees, with his head resting on his crossed hands and his pockets turned inside out; Moore was found sprawled face-down in the back seat. There is evidence that suggests she was placed there after being killed on a blanket outside the car.

Griffin had been shot twice while inside the car; both had been shot once in the back of the head, and both were fully clothed. A blood-soaked patch of earth near the car suggested to police that they had been killed outside the car and placed back inside. Congealed blood was found covering the running board, and it had flowed through the bottom of the car door. A .32 caliber cartridge casing was also found, possibly ejected from a pistol wrapped in a blanket. No extant reports indicate that either Griffin or Moore was examined by a pathologist. Contemporaneous local rumor said that Moore had been sexually assaulted, but modern reports refute this claim.

=== April 14: Second double-murder ===
At around 1:30 a.m. on Sunday, April 14, Paul Martin (16) picked up Betty Jo Booker (15) from a musical performance at the VFW Club at West Fourth and Oak Street in Texarkana. Martin's body was found at around 6:30 a.m. later that morning, lying on its left side by the northern edge of North Park Road. Blood was found on the other side of the road by a fence. He had been shot four times: through the nose, through the ribs from behind, in the right hand, and through the back of the neck.

Booker's body was found by a search party at about 11:30 a.m., almost 2 miles (3.2 km) from Martin's body. Her body was behind a tree and lying on its back, fully clothed. It was posed with the right hand in the pocket of the buttoned overcoat. Booker had been shot twice, once through the chest and once in the face. The weapon used was the same as in the first double-murder, a .32 semi-automatic Colt pistol.

Martin's car was found about 3 miles (4.8 km) from Booker's body and 1.55 miles (2.49 km) away from his body. It was parked outside Spring Lake Park with the keys still in the ignition. Authorities were not sure who was shot first. Presley and Texas Ranger Manuel T. Gonzaullas said that examinations of the bodies indicated that they both had put up a terrific struggle. Martin's friend, Tom Albritton, said that he did not believe an argument had happened between the victims and that Martin had not had any enemies.

=== May 3: Fifth murder ===
The fifth murder occurred on Friday, May 3, sometime before 9 p.m., when Virgil Starks (37) and his wife Katie (36) were in their home on a 500-acre (200 ha) farm off Highway 67 East, almost 10 miles (16 km) northeast of Texarkana. Virgil was sitting in an armchair reading the newspaper when he was shot twice in the back of the head from a closed double window. Hearing the sound of broken glass, Katie came from another room and saw Virgil stand up, then slump back into his chair. When she realized he was dead, Katie ran to the crank telephone to call the police. She rang twice before being shot twice in the face from the same window. She fell but soon regained her footing and tried to get a pistol from another room, but was blinded by her own blood.

Katie heard the killer at the back of the house and fled out the front door. She ran barefoot across the street to the home of her sister and brother-in-law. Because no one was home, she ran to neighbor A. V. Prater's house, gasped that "Virgil's dead,” then collapsed. Prater shot a rifle in the air to summon another neighbor, Elmer Taylor, who Prater sent to collect his car. Taylor complied and, along with other members of the Prater family, took Katie to Michael Meagher Hospital (now Miller County Health Unit). Katie was questioned in the operating room by Miller County Sheriff W. E. Davis, who became head of the investigation. Four days later, Davis talked with Katie again, and she discounted a circulating rumor that Virgil had heard a car outside their home several nights in a row and feared being killed.

== Investigations ==
Investigations of the attacks involved law enforcement officers at the city, county, state, and federal levels. Notable investigators included:

- William Hardy "Bill" Presley (1895–1972), the Bowie County sheriff who was the first lawman on the scene of the first three attacks.
- Jackson Neely "Jack" Runnels (1897–1966), the Texarkana chief of police who was among the first called to the scenes of the two double-murders.
- W. E. Davis, the Miller County Sheriff who headed the investigation of the Starks murder.
- Max Andrew Tackett (1912–1972), an Arkansas State Police detective who was first on the scene of the Starks attack and the arresting officer of the lead suspect.
- Tillman Byron Johnson (1911–2008), a Miller County sheriff's deputy who was one of the leading investigators on the case, and was eventually the last surviving participant in the investigation.
- Manuel T. Gonzaullas (1891–1977), a captain in the Texas Rangers who became the public face of the investigation. He was criticized as a "showman" who presented the work of other officers as his own to the press, and spent a great deal of time with female reporters. Five years after the murders, Gonzaullas left the Rangers to become a technical consultant to the entertainment industry.

We want every man and woman in these two counties to recall the dates of these murders and [anyone who] was missing or out of the pocket during those nights. ... any person with information ... should act in the interest of self-preservation.

— Presley and Runnels' joint statement

Law enforcement repeatedly challenged Larey's account of the first attack, believing that she and Hollis knew the identity of their attacker and were covering for him. Larey returned to Texarkana after the Griffin-Moore murders in hopes of helping to link the cases and identify the killer, but the Texas Rangers questioned her story and insisted that she knew who her attacker was. Officers did not publicly connect the Hollis-Larey attack to the subsequent murders until May 11, the day after the Texarkana Gazette published an interview with Larey, when Presley and Runnels called on the public to immediately report anyone who had unexplained absences when the murders occurred.

In response to the Griffin-Moore murders, police launched a citywide investigation along with the Texas and Arkansas police, (Note: i.e.: the independent police forces of Texarkana, Texas, and Texarkana, Arkansas.) the Texas Department of Public Safety (the overseeing agency of the Texas Rangers), the Miller and Cass County sheriffs' departments, and the Federal Bureau of Investigation (FBI). Over 200 persons were questioned in the investigation, and about the same number of false leads were checked. In the Martin-Booker case, friends, acquaintances, and several suspects were questioned by Bowie County investigators who worked in 24-hour shifts. Gonzaullas tried baiting the perpetrator by recruiting teenagers to sit as decoys in parked cars while officers waited nearby. Officers also volunteered as decoys, with real partners or mannequins.

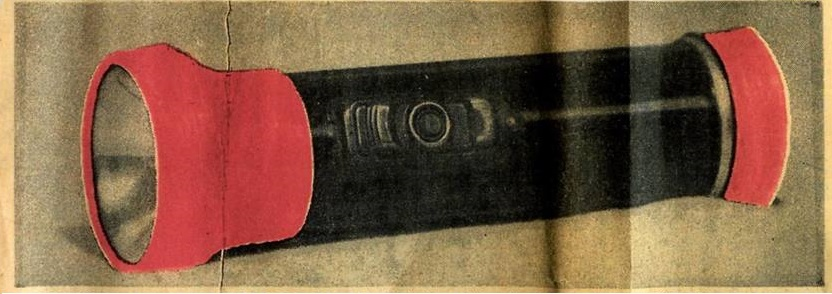
Police called for the public to report anyone who owned a flashlight like the one above, found at the Starks murder scene. This was the first spot-colored photograph published by the Texarkana Gazette.

In the aftermath of the Starks murder, officers from the entire area were called upon to help in the investigation. Blockades were effected on Highway 67 East. Those who had been driving in the area at the time of the slaying, along with several men found in the vicinity, were detained for questioning. By May 5, forty-seven officers were working to solve the murders. On May 9, a mobile radio station arrived with twenty Arkansas State Police officers and a fleet of ten prowl cars equipped with two-way radios, to help coordinate the growing investigation. On May 11, a teletype machine was installed in the Bowie County Sheriff's office to connect with other law-enforcement offices in Texas. The unofficial theory for a motive amongst the majority of officers was that of "sex mania", as large amounts of money in the home were not taken, nor was Katie's purse.

By March 30, police had posted a $500 reward ($8,035 in 2024) in an effort to gain any new information on the case, but this produced over 100 false leads with no fruitful clues or suspects. Within days of the Booker-Martin murders, the reward fund had exceeded $1,700 ($27,380 in 2024). It rose to $7,025 ($113,145 in 2024) on the night of the Starks murder and passed $10,000 ($161,061 in 2024) in the following ten days. There was some hesitation in linking the Starks murder to the other crimes, because the weapon used was a .22, and Davis believed it was an automatic rifle. By November 1948, authorities no longer considered the Starks murder connected to the two double-murders.

== Public reaction ==
The Griffin-Moore murders raised public concerns but were generally taken as an isolated incident, as officials did not publicly connect the earlier Hollis-Larey attack to the murders while the Phantom Killer was active. The Martin-Booker murders thus greatly alarmed the public to the likelihood of a serial predator. The deaths of these two church-going teenagers shocked the community. Booker had been a popular high-school junior, a sorority member, an officer of her high school band, a winner of scholastic, literary and musical prizes, and a former Little Miss Texarkana. Her high school ended classes early so that hundreds of young people could attend the funerals. Curfews were set for businesses in an attempt to keep people off the streets at night. It was additionally at this point that the hypothesized serial killer was dubbed "The Phantom Killer" by local media.

Hysteria grew in the days following the murder of Virgil Starks in his home. There was constant media coverage of the increased police activity and the Texarkana Gazette stated on May 5 that the killer might strike again at any moment, at any place, and at anyone. For a week police were inundated with reports of prowlers. One officer stated that nearly all of the alarm was the result of excitement, wild imagination, and near-hysteria.

Previously, it had been normal for houses to be left unlocked. The murders alarmed residents into taking precautions with security: from locking doors to arming themselves with guns; some people nailed sheets over their windows, some nailed windows down and some used screen-door braces as window guards. The day after Starks's death, stores sold out of locks, guns, ammunition, window shades and Venetian blinds. Additional items of which sales increased included window sash locks, screen door hooks, night latches, and other protective devices.

Because citizens were substantially nervous and armed with guns, Texarkana became a dangerous place. When calling on an address, law enforcement officers would turn on their sirens, stand in their headlights, and announce themselves to keep from being shot by a nervous homeowner. The fear was significant enough to spread to other cities, including Hope, Lufkin, Magnolia, and as far as Oklahoma City, where there were sales spikes for guns and axes. After three weeks without an associated murder, Texarkana's fear began to lessen. The concern lasted throughout the summer and subsided after three months had passed.

=== Rumors ===
Do not spread rumors ... chances are that the person listening will repeat your information and enlarge upon it [... eventually requiring] a detailed investigation by the officers, thereby perhaps pulling them off the true trail

— Texarkana Gazette editorial, March 27, 1946

The rampant spreading of rumors fed the panic and made the police investigations more difficult. On April 18, Gonzaullas held a press conference to dispel rumors that the murderer had been caught. He stated that the rumors circulating among the public and in the newspapers were "a hindrance to the investigation and harmful to innocent persons." He stressed this again in a radio interview on May 7: "[rumors] only take the officers from the main route of the investigation. It is so important that we capture this man that we cannot afford to overlook any lead, no matter how fantastic it may seem."

The people must not become so anxious to rid themselves of the killer that they brand innocent persons as the murderer...

— Sheriff Presley

Rumors continued to be spread through mid-May. Many people believed that the slayer had been caught. Some believed he was being secretly held at the Bowie County Jail or flown to another jail. The Gazette and News offices were drowned with phone calls, both local and long distance, inquiring about the apprehension of the killer. Presley declared that innocent people were being accused of being the Phantom and asked residents to show more consideration for their fellow citizens.

=== Vigilantism ===
Although most of the town was in fear of the Phantom, some youths continued parking on deserted roads, hoping to apprehend the perpetrator. Johnson and an Arkansas State Trooper were patrolling a vacant road at night when they came up to a parked car. When Johnson approached the car and noticed a couple, he introduced himself and asked if they weren't scared. The girl replied, "It's a good thing you told me who you are," and she revealed that she had been pointing a .25 ACP pistol at him.

On the night of May 10, Texarkana City Police officers were alerted to a car that had been following a bus. They chased it for three miles (4.8 km) before shooting the tires and arresting C. J. Lauderdale Jr., a high-school athlete. When questioned at the station, he explained that he was unaware they were policemen because they were driving an unmarked car. He said he was following the bus because he was suspicious of a passenger that had entered from a private car. On May 12, Gonzaullas gave a warning to "teenage sleuths" in the Gazette, saying, "it's a good way to get killed."

== The killer ==
=== "The Phantom Killer" ===
The unidentified killer did not acquire a nickname until after the deaths of Booker and Martin. In the April 16 edition of the Texarkana Daily News, a heading read "Phantom Killer Eludes Officers as Investigation of Slayings Pressed". This front-page story was continued on page two with the headline, "Phantom Slayer Eludes Police". The Texarkana Gazette contained a small title on April 17 which read, "Phantom Slayer Still at Large as Probe Continues". J. Q. Mahaffey, executive editor of the Texarkana Gazette in 1946, said that managing editor Calvin Sutton had an acute sense for the dramatic, which impelled him to ask if they could refer to the unknown murderer as "The Phantom". Mahaffey replied, "Why not? If the SOB continues to elude capture, he certainly can be called a phantom!"

=== Description ===
Jimmy Hollis and Mary Jeanne Larey were the only victims able to give a description of their attacker. They described him as being six feet (1.8 m) tall, wearing a white mask over his face with holes cut out for his eyes and mouth. Although Hollis believed he was a young, dark-tanned, white man under 30 years old, Larey believed he was a light-skinned African American. With no description from the other incidents, it cannot be certain if the same perpetrator or perpetrators were responsible, though it is generally assumed that the crimes were the work of a single individual.

=== Method of operation ===
The modus operandi established for the killer was that he attacked young couples in empty or private areas just outside city limits using a .32 caliber gun. Although the caliber used in the Starks murder was a .22, a .32 was still believed by the majority of lawmen to have been used by the Phantom. He always attacked late at night on weekends, with cooling off periods of about three weeks between attacks.

=== Profile ===
Gonzaullas stated that he and his officers were dealing with a "shrewd criminal who had left no stone unturned to conceal his identity and activities," and that the murderer's efforts were both clever and baffling. He also stated that the man they were hunting was a "cunning individual who would go to all lengths to avoid apprehension."

At the Starks murder scene, Presley said, "This killer is the luckiest person I have ever known. No one sees him, hears him in time, or can identify him in any way." Officers have said that the killer is apparently a maniac who is an expert with a gun. Victim and survivor Hollis said, "I know he's crazy. The crazy things he said made me feel that his mind was warped."

Dr. Anthony Lapalla, a psychologist at the Federal Correctional Institution in Texarkana, believed at the time that the killer was planning to continue to make unexpected attacks such as that of Virgil Starks on the outskirts of town. He also believed that the same person committed all five murders, and that the killer was somewhere between his mid-30s and 50, apparently motivated by a strong sex drive and sadism. Lapella stated that a person who would commit such crimes was intelligent, clever, and shrewd, and often was not apprehended.

According to Lapalla's theories, the killer was not afraid of the police activity, but was aware of the increased difficulty of attacking people on vacant roads and so he had shifted his target to a farmhouse. He said that the killer could be leading a normal life, was unlikely a veteran, (Note: Lapalla believed that maniacal tendencies would have been apparent in the military.) and was not necessarily a resident of the area despite his knowledge of it. He stated that the attacks show evidence of deep planning, that the killer works alone and tells no one of his crimes, and could either shift his crimes to a distant community or overcome the desire to assault and kill people. Lapalla did not believe the killer was a black man because "in general, negro criminals are not that clever."

== Suspects ==
Throughout the investigations of the Phantom Killer case, almost 400 suspects were investigated. There were numerous false confessions investigated by police. Tackett recalled nine people who confessed to being the Phantom, but their statements did not agree with the facts. In the Hollis and Larey case, no suspects were apprehended. In the Griffin and Moore case, over 200 people were questioned, and about the same number of false tips and leads were checked. Three suspects were taken into custody for bloody clothing, two of whom were released after officers received satisfying explanations. The remaining suspect was held in Vernon, Texas, for further investigation, but was later cleared of suspicion.

=== Youell Swinney ===
Youell Swinney was a 29-year-old car thief and counterfeiter. He was arrested in July by Tackett, who was investigating car thefts, after realizing that on the night of the Griffin-Moore murders, a car had been stolen in the area and a previously stolen car had been found abandoned. Tackett was able to locate the former car and arrested Swinney's wife, Peggy, when she came to retrieve it. Peggy confessed in great detail that Swinney was the Phantom Killer and had killed Booker and Martin. Her story changed in some details across several interviews, and police believed she was withholding information due to fear of Swinney or of incriminating herself.

Police were able to independently verify some details of Peggy's confession, such as the location of a victim's possessions, where she said Youell had discarded them. There was considerable circumstantial evidence against Swinney, (Note: The circumstantial evidence against Youell Swinney included: His wife being in possession of the car stolen the night of the Griffin-Moore murders. Swinney repeatedly stated on arrest that "You want [or "got"] me for more than stealing cars." Swinney's fear of being shot by police or being sentenced to the electric chair. Peggy identified the spot where Booker went into the woods. Police found a work shirt in Swinney's room with the laundry mark "S-T-A-R-K" and slag in the front pocket which matched samples from Virgil Starks's welding shop. Swinney had recently sold a .32 automatic Colt pistol in a craps game.) but Peggy's confession was the most critical part of the case. However, Peggy recanted her confession, was considered an unreliable witness, and could not be compelled to testify against her husband.

Law enforcement officers worked for six months trying to validate Peggy's confession and tie Swinney to the murders. They found that on the night of the Booker-Martin murders, the Swinneys were sleeping in their car under a bridge near San Antonio. Swinney was never charged with murder and was instead tried and imprisoned as a habitual offender for car theft. Presley reported in his 2014 book that investigators in the Swinney case later said that the sentence was effectively a plea bargain, though the case files indicated no formal agreement. Swinney was apparently concerned about being sentenced to death for the murders, so he agreed to not contest the habitual offender charge and, in fact, tried to plead guilty despite the charge requiring a jury trial.

=== "Doodie" Tennison ===
Henry Booker "Doodie" Tennison was an 18-year-old university freshman who died by suicide on November 4, 1948, leaving behind cryptic instructions which directed investigators to a suicide note in which Tennison confessed to the Booker, Martin, and Starks murders. He had played trombone in the same high-school band as Booker, but they were not friends. Investigators were unable to find any other evidence linking Tennison to the murders. James Freeman, a friend of Tennison, provided an alibi for the night of the Starks murder, stating that they had been playing cards that evening when they heard the news of the attack.

=== Ralph Baumann ===
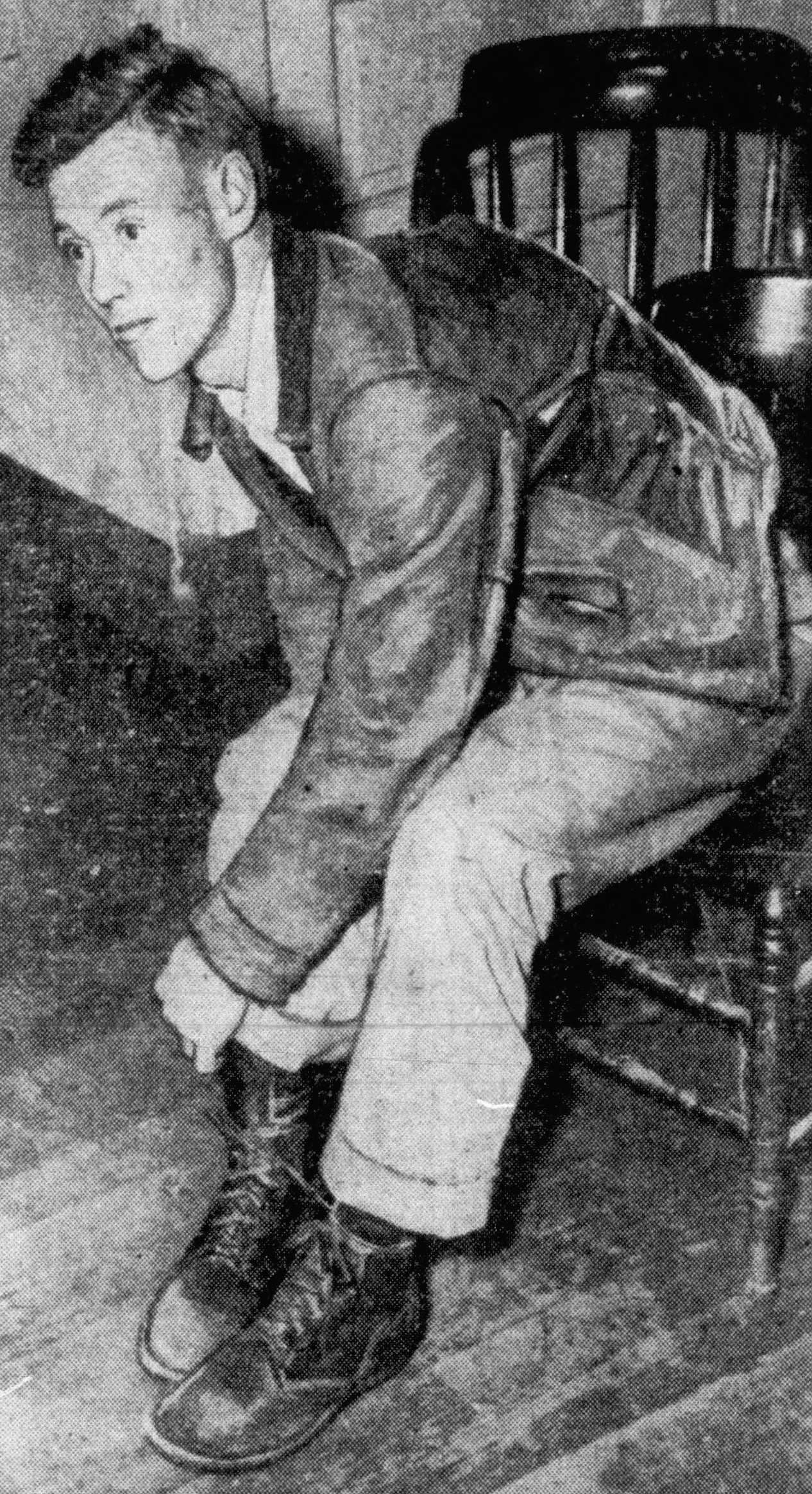
Baumann after turning himself to the LAPD in May 1946.

Ralph Baumann, a 21-year-old ex-Army Air Force (AAF) machine-gunner, claimed to have awoken from a fugue state of several weeks on the day of the Starks murder, with his rifle missing. He said that he heard about a suspect matching his description and hitchhiked to Los Angeles, feeling like he was running from murder. On May 23, he told Los Angeles police that he thought he might be the Phantom. "I'm my own suspect," he said.

Police arrested him but Gonzaullas stated that several parts of the man's story had little basis in fact. Baumann said that he'd been discharged from the AAF for being a psychoneurotic, and he had previously confessed to killing three people in Texarkana in a period of three days (which did not match the timeline of killings).

=== Saxophone peddler ===
Investigators had hoped that Booker's saxophone, which she had played the night of her murder and which was missing, might lead them to a suspect. On April 27, a suspicious man was arrested in Corpus Christi, Texas, for trying to sell a saxophone to a music store. He had asked about selling the instrument to the store but became evasive and fled from the store manager. Although no saxophone was found in his possession, the police found a bag of bloody clothing in his hotel room. After several days of questioning, the man was cleared as a suspect. Booker's saxophone was located on October 24, six months after her murder, in underbrush near the place her body had been found.

=== German prisoner of war ===
On May 8, it was announced that an escaped German prisoner of war—who was already being hunted as "a matter of routine"—was considered a suspect. He was described as a stocky 24-year-old, weighing 187 pounds (85 kg), with brown hair and blue eyes. He had stolen a car in Mount Ida, Arkansas, and attempted to buy ammunition in several eastern Oklahoma towns. The police kept searching for the POW, but it was said that he had "vanished into thin air."

=== Unknown hitchhiker ===
On May 7, a hitchhiker armed with a pistol carjacked and robbed a man, threatening to kill him and stating that he had killed five people in Texarkana, naming Martin and Booker. The hitchhiker went on to say that he was not finished killing people. Gonzaullas said that police were doubtful that this man was the Phantom Killer, noting that the killer had gone to lengths to conceal his identity while the hitchhiker boasted to a living witness.

=== Atoka County suspect ===
On May 10, in Atoka, Oklahoma, a man assaulted a woman in her home, ranting that he might as well kill her because he had already killed three or four people, and that he was going to rape her. He then fled. A widespread search for the man included 20 officers and 160 residents. Two days later, police arrested a suspect but did not believe this man was the Phantom. According to the man's story, he could not have been in Texarkana at the time of the Starks murder.

=== Sammie ===
Sammie is a pseudonym given to a longtime Texarkana resident with a good reputation and no criminal record whom the police were reluctant to name as a suspect. He came to attention when his vehicle's tire tracks were found across the road from Martin's corpse. He failed a polygraph test so the police decided to have him hypnotized by psychiatrist Travis Elliott. Elliott concluded Sammie had no criminal tendencies, and learned Sammie had pulled his vehicle to the side of the road in order to urinate before visiting a married woman with whom he was having an affair. Concealing the affair caused Sammie to fail the polygraph test. After police verified the details, they cleared Sammie as a suspect.

=== Earl McSpadden ===
On May 7, at approximately 6 a.m., the body of Earl Cliff McSpadden was found on the Kansas City Southern Railway tracks 16 miles (26 km) north of Texarkana, near Ogden. The body's left arm and leg had been severed by a freight train a half-hour earlier. The coroner's jury's verdict stated, "death at the hands of persons unknown", and that "he was dead before being placed on the railroad tracks." Because the murder is unsolved, locals have speculated that McSpadden was the Phantom's sixth victim. A prominent rumor exists claiming that McSpadden was the Phantom, and had died by suicide when he jumped in front of a train.

== In media ==
Film:

- In 1976, Texarkana native Charles B. Pierce made the film The Town That Dreaded Sundown, based on Gonzaullas's investigation into the murders. Since 2003, it has been screened annually by Texarkana Parks & Recreation. In 2014, a remake with the same name was released.
- The "Texarkana Moonlight Murderer" (actor uncredited) was featured in a musical montage in the 2012 film Seven Psychopaths directed by Martin McDonagh.

Television:

- Chiller's Killer Legends (2014)
- KDFW's The Tex Files: Phantom Killer (2002)
- TLC's Ultimate Ten: Unsolved Crime Mysteries (2001)

Literature (Non-Fiction):

- Corroborating Evidence by William Rasmussen (October 15, 2005)
- Death in a Texas Desert: And Other True Crime Stories from The Dallas Observer by Carlton Stowers (January 30, 2003)
- Haunted Route 66: Ghosts of America's Legendary Highway by Richard Southall (February 8, 2013)
- Lone Wolf Gonzaullas, Texas Ranger by Brownson Malsch (September 15, 1998)
- The Phantom Killer: Unlocking the Mystery of the Texarkana Serial Murders by James Presley (November 15, 2014)
- The Texarkana Moonlight Murders: The Unsolved Case of the 1946 Phantom Killer by Michael Newton (May 14, 2013)
- Texas Confidential: Sex, Scandal, Murder, and Mayhem in the Lone Star State by Michael Varhola (July 19, 2011)
- Texas Ranger Tales: Stories That Need Telling by Mike Cox (April 1, 1997)
- Time of the Rangers: Texas Rangers: From 1900 to the Present by Mike Cox (August 18, 2009)

Literature (Fiction):

- Betty Jo's Rose by Robert Stewart (May 31, 2012)
- It's a Marvelous Night for a Moondance by Flo Fitzpatrick (April 8, 2011)
- Untied Shoelace by Pam Kumpe (February 6, 2014)
- Unshackled Courage by Pam Kumpe (May 27, 2018)

== See also ==
- List of fugitives from justice who disappeared
- List of serial killers in the United States

== Works cited ==
- Newton, Michael (2004). The Encyclopedia of Unsolved Crimes. Infobase Publishing. ISBN 978-0-816-06988-0.
- Newton, Michael (2013). The Texarkana Moonlight Murders: The Unsolved Case of the 1946 Phantom Killer. McFarland. ISBN 978-1-476-60578-4.
