= 2016 United States House of Representatives elections in Texas =

- November 8, 2016

All 36 Texas seats to the United States House of Representatives
- Turnout: 57%
	Majority party	Minority party
Party	Republican	Democratic
Seats before	25	11
Seats won	25	11
Seat change	Steady	Steady
Popular vote	4,877,605	3,160,535
Percentage	57.19%	37.06%
Swing	▼3.09%	▲3.96%

Republican
40–50%
50–60%
60–70%
70–80%
80–90%
90>%
Democratic
40–50%
50–60%
60–70%
70–80%
80–90%

The 2016 United States House of Representatives elections in Texas were held on November 8, 2016, to elect the 36 U.S. representatives from the state of Texas, one from each of the state's 36 congressional districts. The elections coincided with the 2016 presidential election, as well as other elections to the House of Representatives, elections to the United States Senate and various state and local elections. The primaries were held on March 1.

== Overview ==
2016 United States House of Representatives elections in Texas
Party	Votes	Percentage	Seats before	Seats after	+/–
Republican	4,877,605	57.19%	25	25	0
Democratic	3,160,535	37.06%	11	11	0
Libertarian	360,066	4.22%	0	0	0
Green	130,254	1.53%	0	0	0
Write-In	66	<0.01%	0	0	-
Totals	8,528,526	100.00%	36	36	—

== District 1 ==
2016 Texas's 1st congressional district election
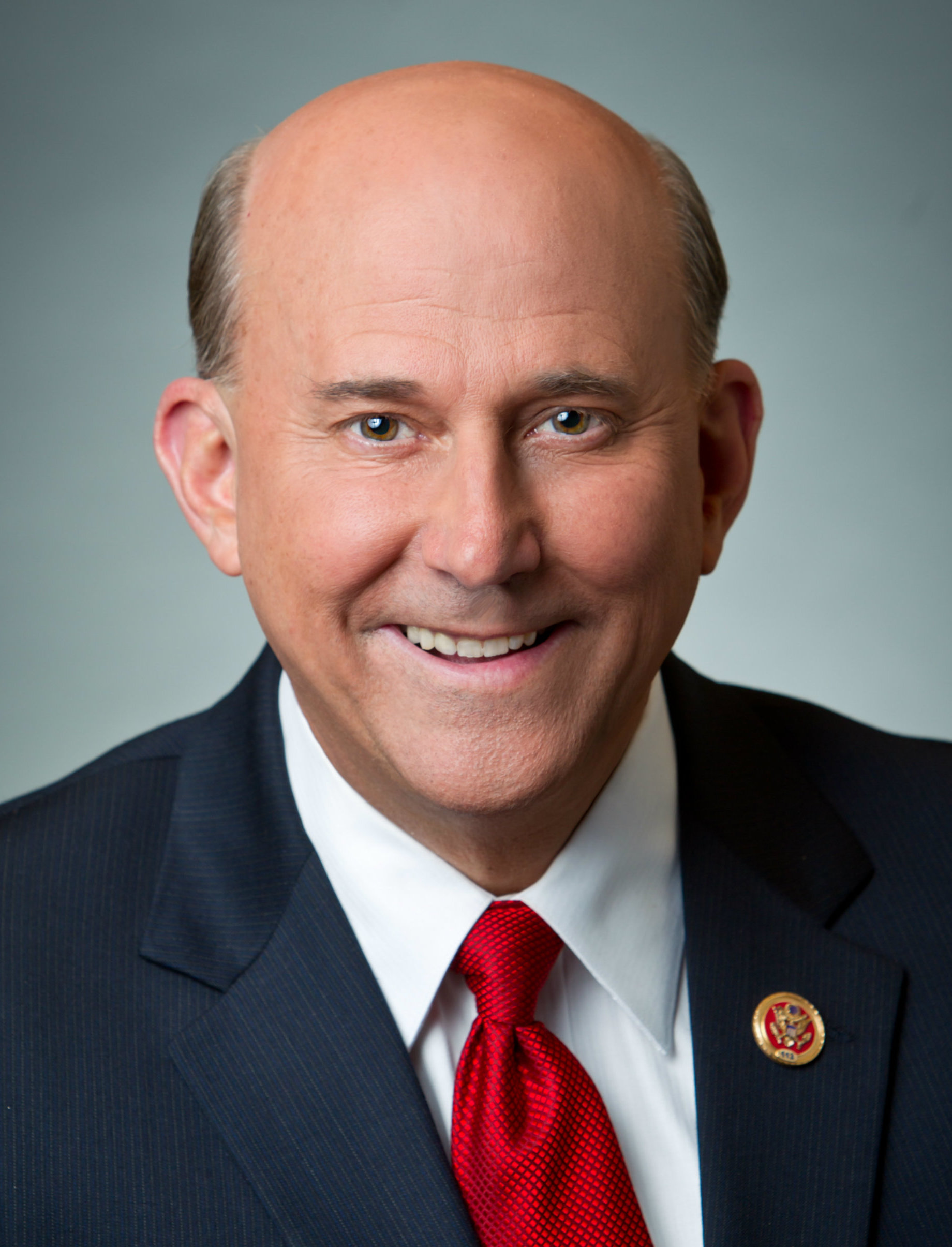

Nominee	Louie Gohmert	Shirley McKellar
Party	Republican	Democratic
Popular vote	192,434	62,847
Percentage	73.9%	24.1%
- County results Gohmert: 60–70% 70–80% 80–90%
U.S. Representative before election
Louie Gohmert
Republican
Elected U.S. Representative
Louie Gohmert
Republican

Incumbent Republican Louie Gohmert, who had represented the district since 2004, ran for re-election. He was re-elected with 77% of the vote in 2014. The district had a PVI of R+24.

=== Republican primary ===
==== Candidates ====
===== Nominee =====
- Louie Gohmert, incumbent U.S. representative

===== Eliminated in primary =====
- Anthony Culler
- Simon Winston, rancher

==== Results ====
Republican primary results
Party	Candidate	Votes	%
Republican	Louie Gohmert (incumbent)	96,313	82.0
Republican	Simon Winston	16,335	13.9
Republican	Anthony Culler	4,879	4.1
Total votes		117,527	100.0

=== Democratic primary ===
==== Candidates ====
===== Nominee =====
- Shirley McKellar, Army veteran, non-profit businesswoman and nominee for this seat in 2012 & 2014

==== Results ====
Democratic primary results
Party	Candidate	Votes	%
Democratic	Shirley J. McKellar	17,139	100.0
Total votes		17,139	100.0

=== General election ===
==== Endorsements ====
Shirley McKellar (D)

Labor unions

- AFL-CIO

==== Predictions ====
Source	Ranking	As of
The Cook Political Report	Safe R	November 7, 2016
Daily Kos Elections	Safe R	November 7, 2016
Rothenberg	Safe R	November 3, 2016
Sabato's Crystal Ball	Safe R	November 7, 2016
RCP	Safe R	October 31, 2016

==== Results ====
Texas's 1st congressional district, 2016
Party	Candidate	Votes	%
Republican	Louie Gohmert (incumbent)	192,434	73.9
Democratic	Shirley J. McKellar	62,847	24.1
Libertarian	Phil Gray	5,062	2.0
Independent	Renee Culler	66	0.0
Total votes		260,409	100.0
Republican hold			

== District 2 ==
2016 Texas's 2nd congressional district election
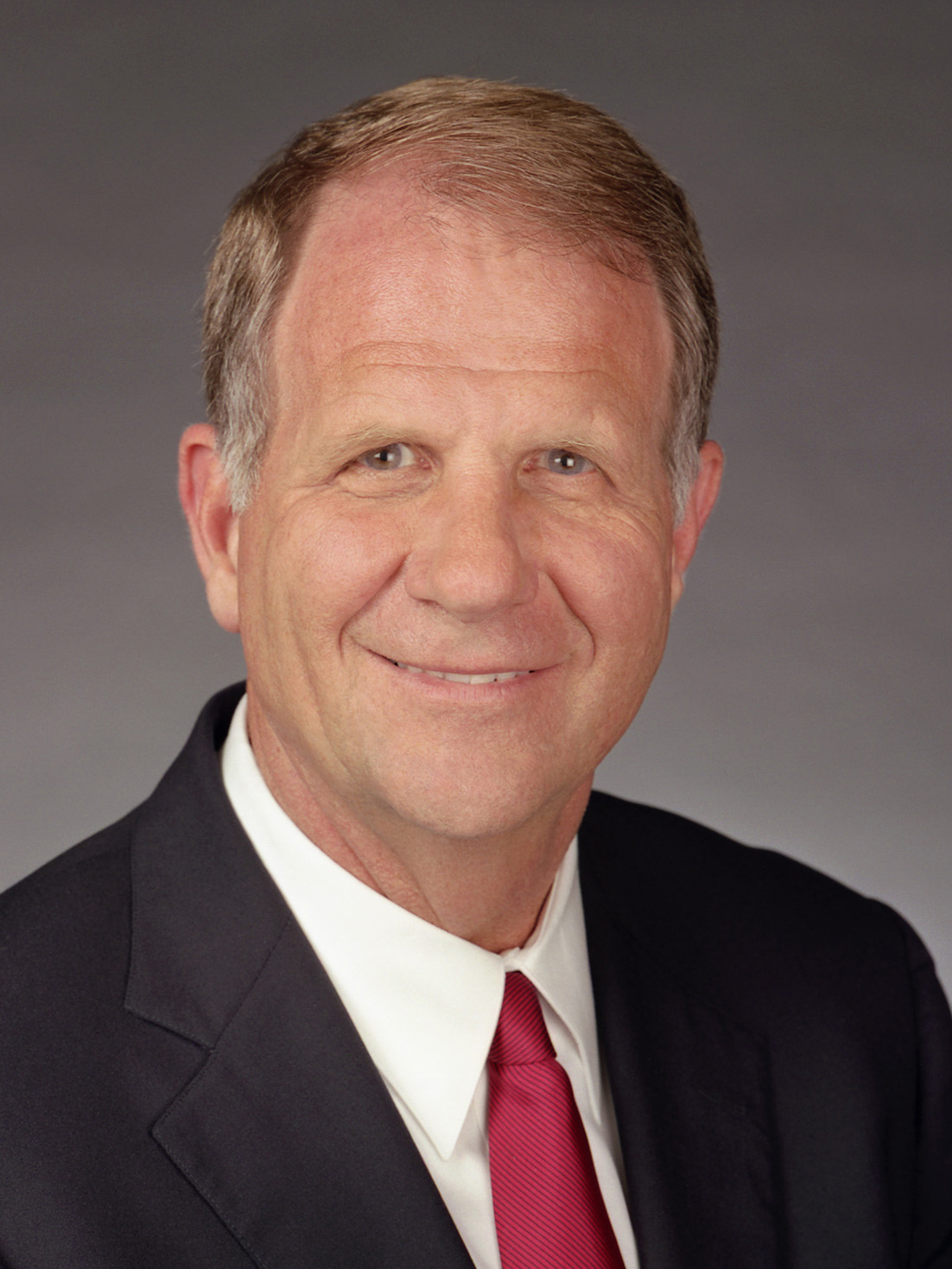

Nominee	Ted Poe	Pat Bryan
Party	Republican	Democratic
Popular vote	168,692	100,231
Percentage	60.6%	36.0%
- County results Poe: 60–70%
U.S. Representative before election
Ted Poe
Republican
Elected U.S. Representative
Ted Poe
Republican

Incumbent Republican Ted Poe, who had represented the district since 2004, ran for re-election. He was re-elected with 68% of the vote in 2014. The district had a PVI of R+16.

=== Republican primary ===
==== Candidates ====
===== Nominee =====
- Ted Poe, incumbent U.S. representative

==== Results ====
Republican primary results
Party	Candidate	Votes	%
Republican	Ted Poe (incumbent)	75,404	100.0
Total votes		75,404	100.0

=== Democratic primary ===
==== Candidates ====
===== Nominee =====
- Pat Bryan, retired IT technician

==== Results ====
Democratic primary results
Party	Candidate	Votes	%
Democratic	Pat Bryan	25,814	100.0
Total votes		25,814	100.0

=== General election ===
==== Predictions ====
Source	Ranking	As of
The Cook Political Report	Safe R	November 7, 2016
Daily Kos Elections	Safe R	November 7, 2016
Rothenberg	Safe R	November 3, 2016
Sabato's Crystal Ball	Safe R	November 7, 2016
RCP	Safe R	October 31, 2016

==== Results ====
Texas's 2nd congressional district, 2016
Party	Candidate	Votes	%
Republican	Ted Poe (incumbent)	168,692	60.6
Democratic	Pat Bryan	100,231	36.0
Libertarian	James B. Veasaw	6,429	2.3
Green	Joshua Darr	2,884	1.1
Total votes		278,236	100.0
Republican hold			

== District 3 ==
2016 Texas's 3rd congressional district election
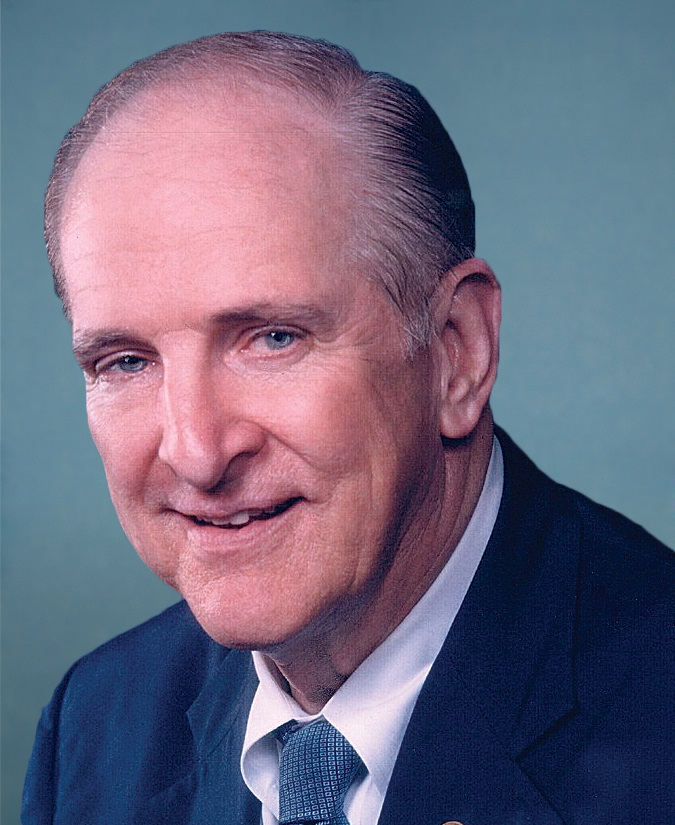

Nominee	Sam Johnson	Adam Bell
Party	Republican	Democratic
Popular vote	193,684	109,420
Percentage	61.2%	34.6%
- County results Johnson: 60–70%
U.S. Representative before election
Sam Johnson
Republican
Elected U.S. Representative
Sam Johnson
Republican

The incumbent was Republican Sam Johnson, who had represented the district since 1991. He was re-elected with 82% of the vote in 2014.The district had a PVI of R+17.

=== Republican primary ===
==== Candidates ====
===== Nominee =====
- Sam Johnson, incumbent U.S. representative

===== Eliminated in primary =====
- Dave Cornette
- John Slavens, certified public accountant
- Keith Thurgood, retired U.S. Army major general

===== Declined =====
- Scott Turner, state representative

==== Results ====
Republican primary results
Party	Candidate	Votes	%
Republican	Sam Johnson (incumbent)	65,451	74.6
Republican	John Calvin Slavens	10,043	11.5
Republican	Keith L. Thurgood	7,173	8.2
Republican	David Cornette	5,037	5.7
Total votes		87,704	100.0

=== Democratic primary ===
==== Candidates ====
===== Nominee =====
- Adam Bell, small business owner

===== Eliminated in primary =====
- Michael Filak

==== Results ====
Democratic primary results
Party	Candidate	Votes	%
Democratic	Adam Bell	14,270	60.3
Democratic	Michael Filak	9,395	39.7
Total votes		23,665	100.0

=== General election ===
==== Predictions ====
Source	Ranking	As of
The Cook Political Report	Safe R	November 7, 2016
Daily Kos Elections	Safe R	November 7, 2016
Rothenberg	Safe R	November 3, 2016
Sabato's Crystal Ball	Safe R	November 7, 2016
RCP	Safe R	October 31, 2016

==== Results ====
Texas's 3rd congressional district, 2016
Party	Candidate	Votes	%
Republican	Sam Johnson (incumbent)	193,684	61.2
Democratic	Adam P. Bell	109,420	34.6
Libertarian	Scott Jameson	10,448	3.3
Green	Paul Blair	2,915	0.9
Total votes		316,467	100.0
Republican hold			

== District 4 ==
2016 Texas's 4th congressional district election
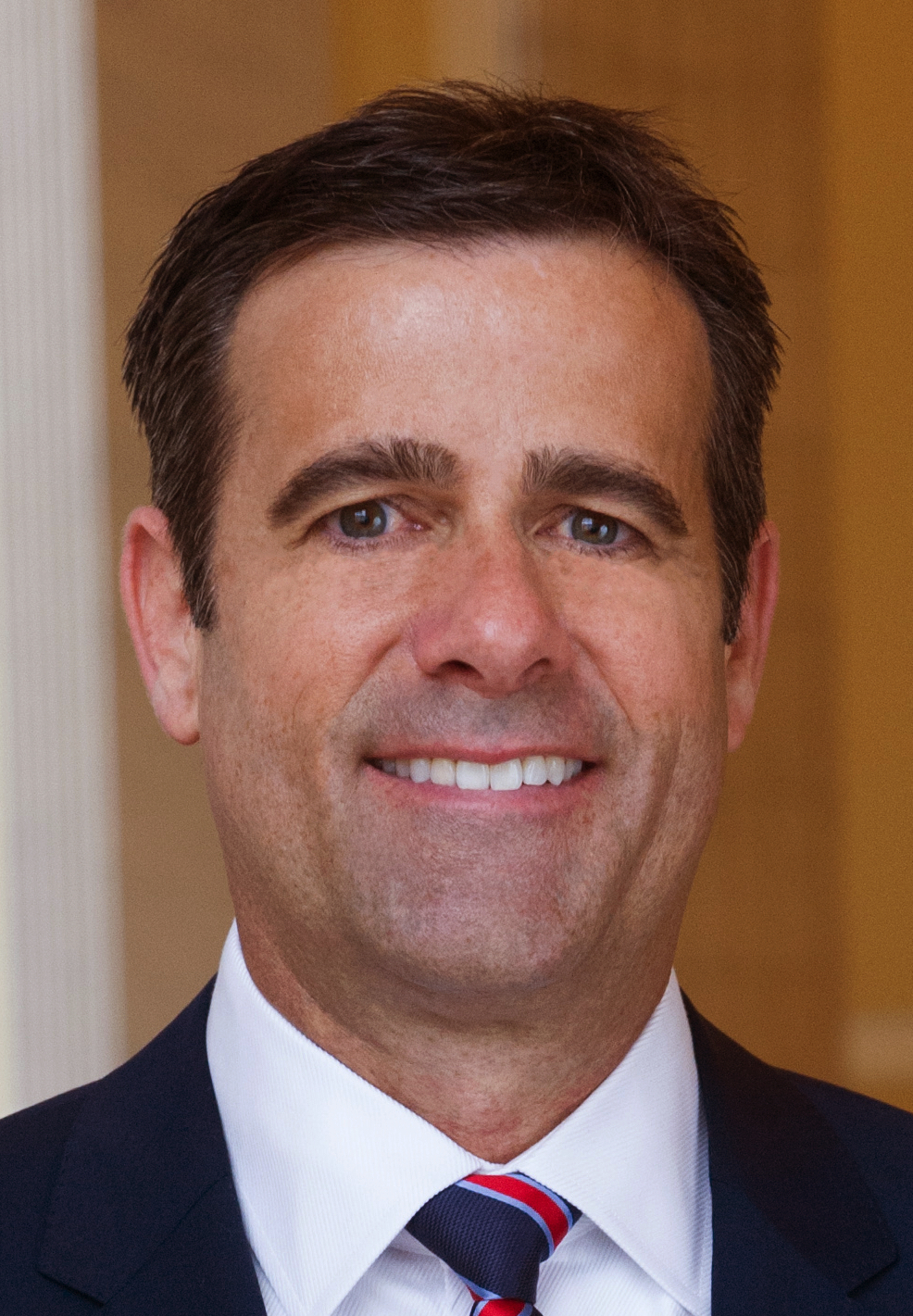

Nominee	John Ratcliffe	Cody Wommack
Party	Republican	Libertarian
Popular vote	216,643	29,577
Percentage	88.0%	12.0%
- County results Ratcliffe: 70–80% 80–90%
U.S. Representative before election
John Ratcliffe
Republican
Elected U.S. Representative
John Ratcliffe
Republican

Incumbent Republican John Ratcliffe, who had represented the district since 2014, ran for re-election.

=== Republican primary ===
==== Candidates ====
===== Nominee =====
- John Ratcliffe, incumbent U.S. representative

===== Eliminated in primary =====
- Lou Gigliotti, auto racing part company owner and candidate for this seat in 2012 & 2014
- Ray Hall

==== Results ====
Republican primary results
Party	Candidate	Votes	%
Republican	John Ratcliffe (incumbent)	77,254	68.0
Republican	Lou Gigliotti	23,939	21.1
Republican	Ray Hall	12,353	10.9
Total votes		113,546	100.0

=== Democratic primary ===
No Democrats filed to run.

=== Libertarian primary ===
==== Candidates ====
===== Nominee =====
- Cody Wommack

=== General election ===
==== Predictions ====
Source	Ranking	As of
The Cook Political Report	Safe R	November 7, 2016
Daily Kos Elections	Safe R	November 7, 2016
Rothenberg	Safe R	November 3, 2016
Sabato's Crystal Ball	Safe R	November 7, 2016
RCP	Safe R	October 31, 2016

==== Results ====
Texas's 4th congressional district, 2016
Party	Candidate	Votes	%
Republican	John Ratcliffe (incumbent)	216,643	88.0
Libertarian	Cody Wommack	29,577	12.0
Total votes		246,220	100.0
Republican hold			

== District 5 ==
2016 Texas's 5th congressional district election
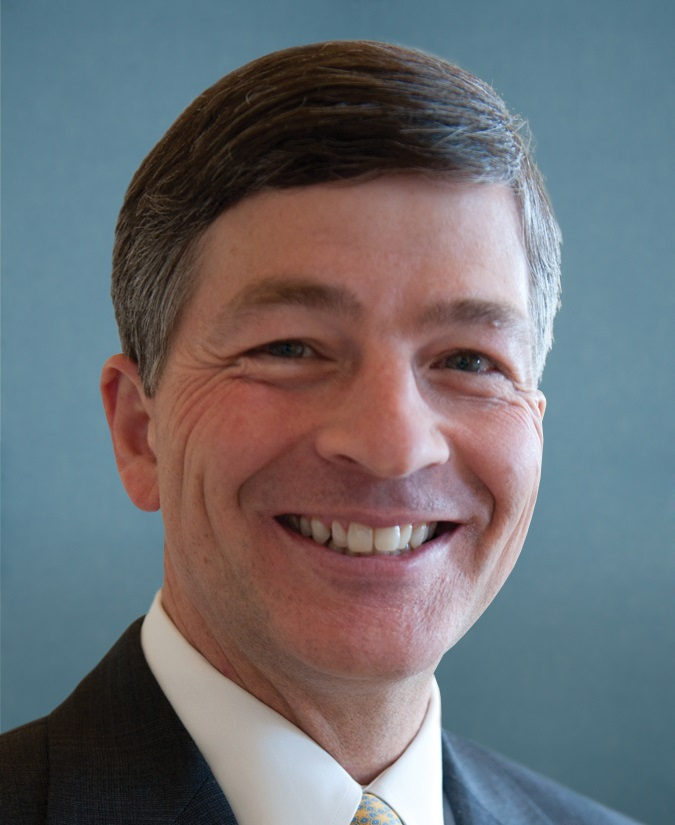

Nominee	Jeb Hensarling	Ken Ashby
Party	Republican	Libertarian
Popular vote	155,469	37,406
Percentage	80.6%	19.4%
- County results Hensarling: 60–70% 70–80%
U.S. Representative before election
Jeb Hensarling
Republican
Elected U.S. Representative
Jeb Hensarling
Republican

The incumbent was Republican Jeb Hensarling, who had represented the district since 2012. He was re-elected with 85% of the vote in 2014. The district had a PVI of R+17.

=== Republican primary ===
==== Candidates ====
===== Nominee =====
- Jeb Hensarling, incumbent U.S. representative

==== Results ====
Republican primary results
Party	Candidate	Votes	%
Republican	Jeb Hensarling (incumbent)	73,143	100.0
Total votes		73,143	100.0

=== Democratic primary ===
No Democrats filed to run.

=== Libertarian primary ===
==== Candidates ====
===== Nominee =====
- Ken Ashby

=== General election ===
==== Predictions ====
Source	Ranking	As of
The Cook Political Report	Safe R	November 7, 2016
Daily Kos Elections	Safe R	November 7, 2016
Rothenberg	Safe R	November 3, 2016
Sabato's Crystal Ball	Safe R	November 7, 2016
RCP	Safe R	October 31, 2016

==== Results ====
Texas's 5th congressional district, 2016
Party	Candidate	Votes	%
Republican	Jeb Hensarling (incumbent)	155,469	80.6
Libertarian	Ken Ashby	37,406	19.4
Total votes		192,875	100.0
Republican hold			

== District 6 ==
2016 Texas's 6th congressional district election
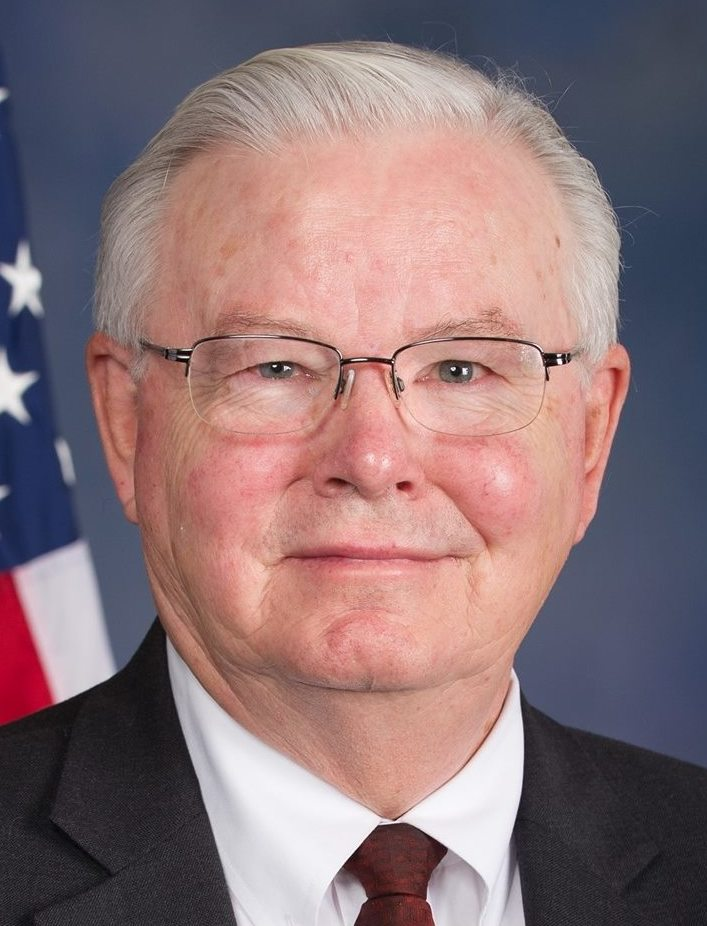

Nominee	Joe Barton	Ruby Faye Woolridge
Party	Republican	Democratic
Popular vote	159,444	106,667
Percentage	58.3%	39.0%
- County results Barton: 50–60% 70–80%
U.S. Representative before election
Joe Barton
Republican
Elected U.S. Representative
Joe Barton
Republican

The incumbent was Republican Joe Barton, who had represented the district since 1985. He was re-elected in 2014 with 61% of the vote. The district had a PVI of R+11. His re-election margin increased to 68.7 percent in the 2016 primary.

=== Republican primary ===
==== Candidates ====
===== Nominee =====
- Joe Barton, incumbent U.S. representative

===== Eliminated in primary =====
- Collin Baker
- Steven Fowler, business owner

==== Results ====
Republican primary results
Party	Candidate	Votes	%
Republican	Joe Barton (incumbent)	55,285	68.6
Republican	Steven Fowler	17,960	22.3
Republican	Collin Baker	7,292	9.1
Total votes		80,537	100.0

=== Democratic primary ===
==== Candidates ====
===== Nominee =====
- Ruby Faye Woolridge, minister, counsellor, and educator

===== Eliminated in primary =====
- Don Jaquess, business owner and candidate for this seat in 2012
- Jeffrey Roseman

===== Withdrawn =====
- David Cozad, software engineer and nominee for this seat in 2010 and 2014

==== Results ====
Democratic primary results
Party	Candidate	Votes	%
Democratic	Ruby Faye Woolridge	23,294	69.7
Democratic	Jeffrey Roseman	5,993	17.9
Democratic	Don Jaquess	4,132	12.4
Total votes		33,419	100.0

=== General election ===
==== Endorsements ====
Ruby Faye Woolridge (D)

Labor unions

- AFL-CIO

==== Predictions ====
Source	Ranking	As of
The Cook Political Report	Safe R	November 7, 2016
Daily Kos Elections	Safe R	November 7, 2016
Rothenberg	Safe R	November 3, 2016
Sabato's Crystal Ball	Safe R	November 7, 2016
RCP	Safe R	October 31, 2016

==== Results ====
Texas's 6th congressional district, 2016
Party	Candidate	Votes	%
Republican	Joe Barton (incumbent)	159,444	58.4
Democratic	Ruby Faye Woolridge	106,667	39.0
Green	Darrel Smith Jr.	7,185	2.6
Total votes		273,296	100.0
Republican hold			

== District 7 ==
2016 Texas's 7th congressional district election
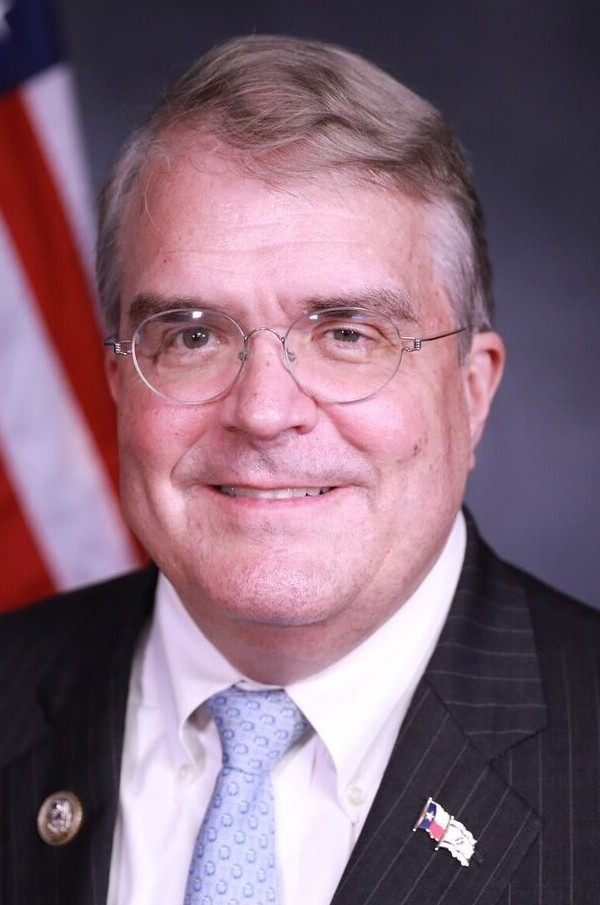

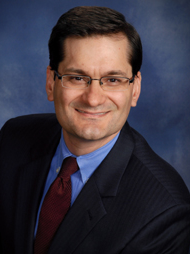
Nominee	John Culberson	James Cargas
Party	Republican	Democratic
Popular vote	143,542	111,991
Percentage	56.2%	43.8%
- County results Culberson: 50–60%
U.S. Representative before election
John Culberson
Republican
Elected U.S. Representative
John Culberson
Republican

Incumbent Republican John Culberson, who had represented the district since 2001, ran for re-election.

=== Republican primary ===
==== Candidates ====
===== Nominee =====
- John Culberson, incumbent U.S. representative

===== Eliminated in primary =====
- Maria Espinoza, anti-immigration activist
- James Lloyd, energy lawyer and former White House national security aide

==== Results ====
Republican primary results
Party	Candidate	Votes	%
Republican	John Culberson (incumbent)	44,290	57.3
Republican	James Lloyd	19,217	24.9
Republican	Maria Espinoza	13,793	17.8
Total votes		77,300	100.0

=== Democratic primary ===
==== Candidates ====
===== Nominee =====
- James Cargas, energy attorney and nominee for the seat in 2012 and 2014

==== Results ====
Democratic primary results
Party	Candidate	Votes	%
Democratic	James Cargas	24,190	100.0
Total votes		24,190	100.0

=== General election ===
==== Predictions ====
Source	Ranking	As of
The Cook Political Report	Safe R	November 7, 2016
Daily Kos Elections	Safe R	November 7, 2016
Rothenberg	Safe R	November 3, 2016
Sabato's Crystal Ball	Safe R	November 7, 2016
RCP	Safe R	October 31, 2016

==== Results ====
Texas's 7th congressional district, 2016
Party	Candidate	Votes	%
Republican	John Culberson (incumbent)	143,542	56.2
Democratic	James Cargas	111,991	43.8
Total votes		255,533	100.0
Republican hold			

== District 8 ==
2016 Texas's 8th congressional district election
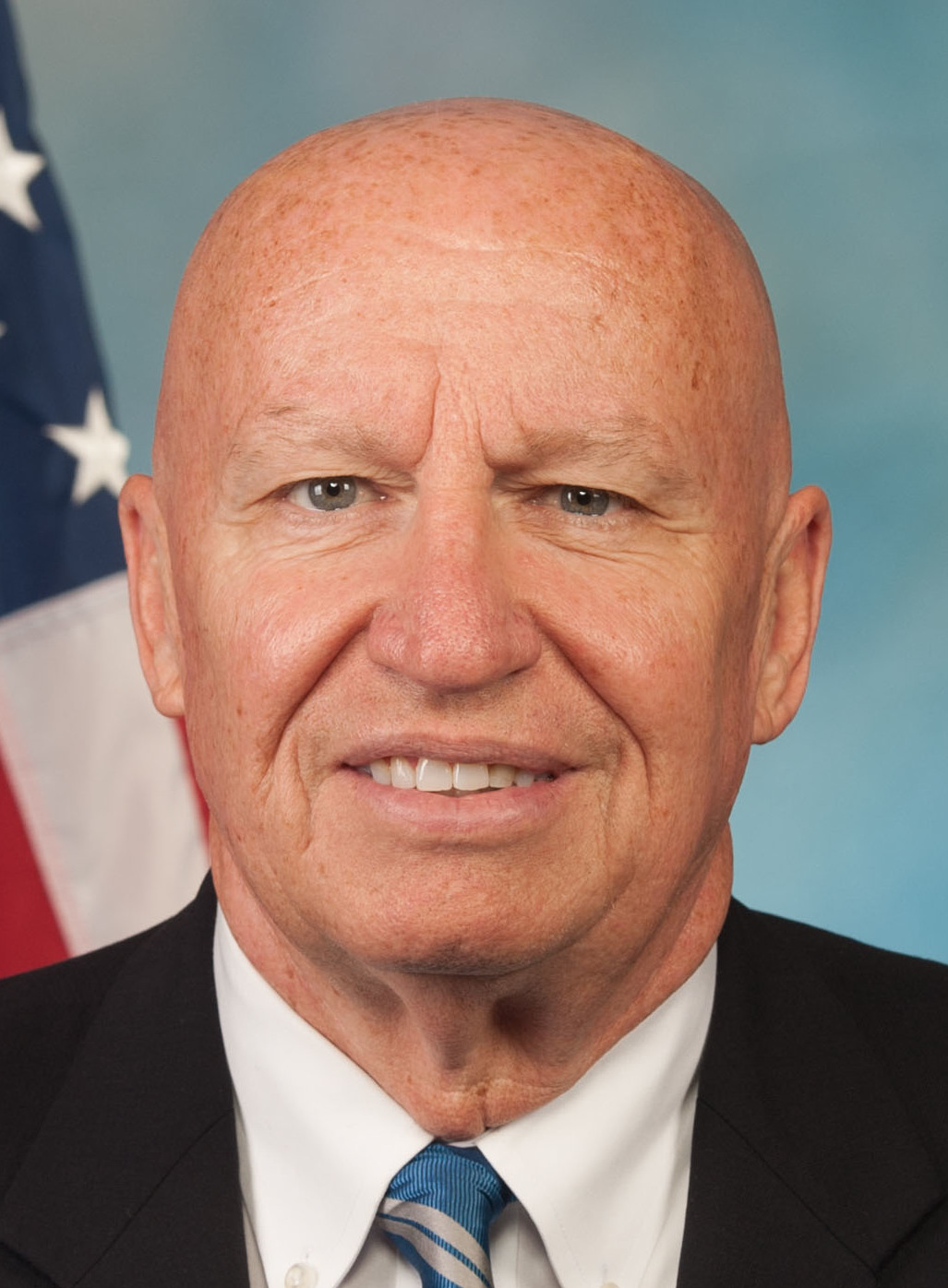
Nominee	Kevin Brady
Party	Republican
Popular vote	236,379
Percentage	100.0%
U.S. Representative before election
Kevin Brady
Republican
Elected U.S. Representative
Kevin Brady
Republican

Incumbent Republican Kevin Brady, who had represented the district since 1997, ran for re-election.

=== Republican primary ===
==== Candidates ====
===== Nominee =====
- Kevin Brady, incumbent U.S. representative

===== Eliminated in primary =====
- Andre Dean
- Craig McMichael, network engineer, Marine Corps veteran and candidate for this seat in 2014
- Steve Toth, former state representative

==== Results ====
Republican primary results
Party	Candidate	Votes	%
Republican	Kevin Brady (incumbent)	65,059	53.4
Republican	Steve Toth	45,436	37.3
Republican	Craig McMichael	6,050	5.0
Republican	Andre Dean	5,233	4.3
Total votes		121,778	100.0

=== Democratic primary ===
No Democrats filed to run.

=== General election ===
==== Predictions ====
Source	Ranking	As of
The Cook Political Report	Safe R	November 7, 2016
Daily Kos Elections	Safe R	November 7, 2016
Rothenberg	Safe R	November 3, 2016
Sabato's Crystal Ball	Safe R	November 7, 2016
RCP	Safe R	October 31, 2016

==== Results ====
Texas's 8th congressional district, 2016
Party	Candidate	Votes	%
Republican	Kevin Brady (incumbent)	236,379	100.0
Total votes		236,379	100.0
Republican hold			

== District 9 ==
2016 Texas's 9th congressional district election
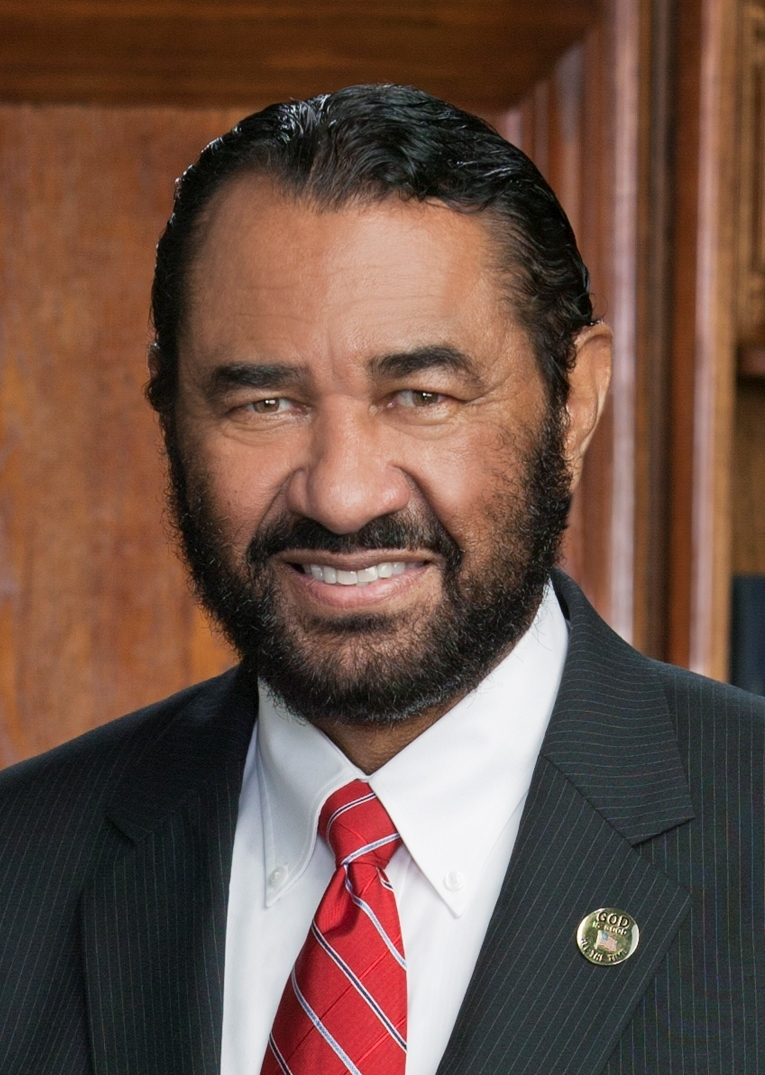

Nominee	Al Green	Jeff Martin
Party	Democratic	Republican
Popular vote	152,032	36,491
Percentage	80.6%	19.4%
- County results Green: 70–80% 80–90%
U.S. Representative before election
Al Green
Democratic
Elected U.S. Representative
Al Green
Democratic

Incumbent Democrat Al Green, who had represented the district since 2004, ran for re-election.

=== Democratic primary ===
==== Candidates ====
===== Nominee =====
- Al Green, incumbent U.S. representative

==== Results ====
Democratic primary results
Party	Candidate	Votes	%
Democratic	Al Green (incumbent)	44,487	100.0
Total votes		44,487	100.0

=== Republican primary ===
==== Candidates ====
===== Nominee =====
- Jeff Martin

==== Results ====
Republican primary results
Party	Candidate	Votes	%
Republican	Jeff Martin	11,696	100.0
Total votes		11,696	100.0

=== General election ===
==== Predictions ====
Source	Ranking	As of
The Cook Political Report	Safe D	November 7, 2016
Daily Kos Elections	Safe D	November 7, 2016
Rothenberg	Safe D	November 3, 2016
Sabato's Crystal Ball	Safe D	November 7, 2016
RCP	Safe D	October 31, 2016

==== Results ====
Texas's 9th congressional district, 2016
Party	Candidate	Votes	%
Democratic	Al Green (incumbent)	152,032	80.6
Republican	Jeff Martin	36,491	19.4
Total votes		188,523	100.0
Democratic hold			

== District 10 ==
2016 Texas's 10th congressional district election
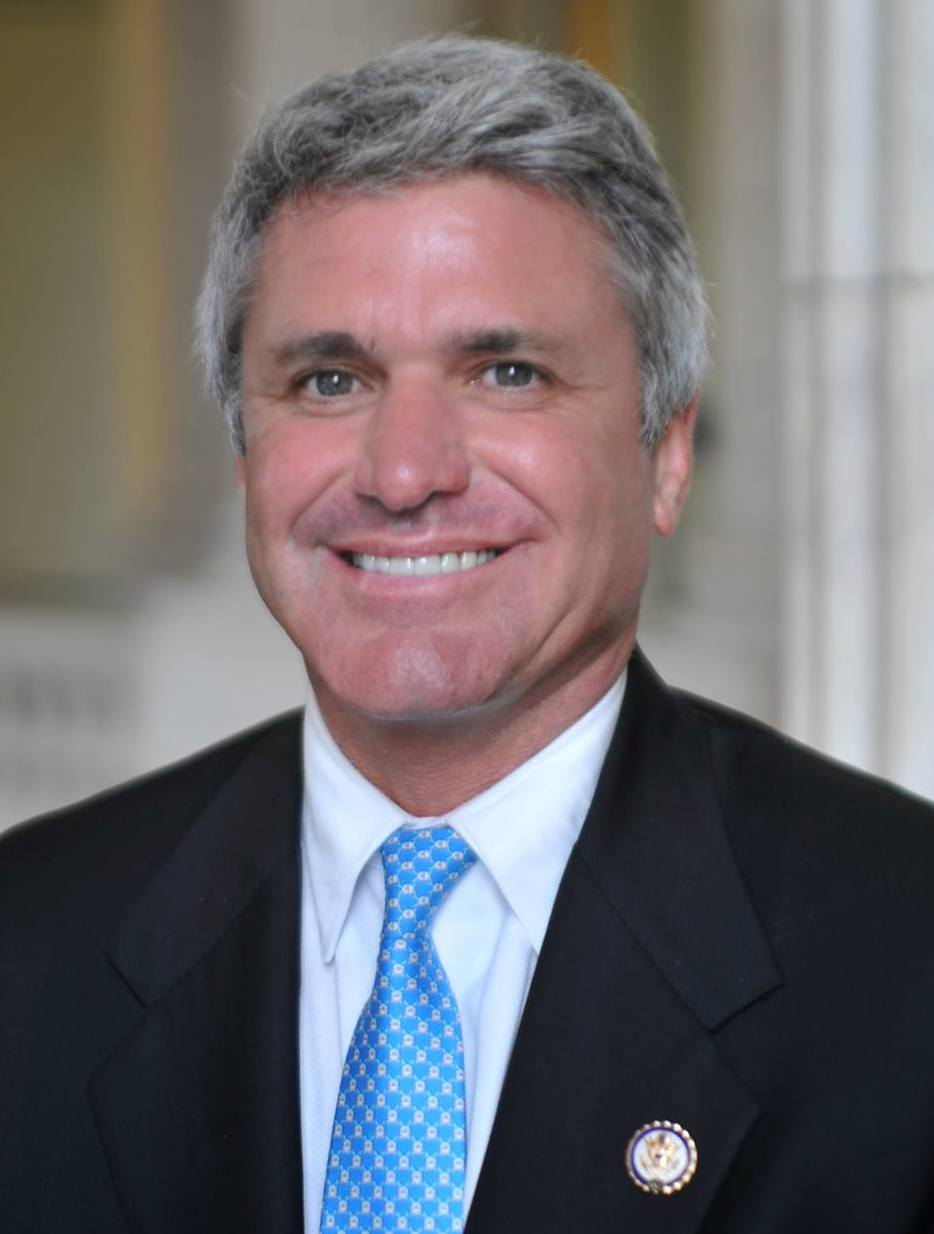

Nominee	Michael McCaul	Tawana Walter-Cadien
Party	Republican	Democratic
Popular vote	179,221	120,170
Percentage	57.3%	38.5%
- County results Mccaul: 50–60% 60–70% 70–80% 80–90% Cadien: 50–60%
U.S. Representative before election
Michael McCaul
Republican
Elected U.S. Representative
Michael McCaul
Republican

Incumbent Republican Michael McCaul, who had represented the district since 2005, ran for re-election.

=== Republican primary ===
==== Candidates ====
===== Nominee =====
- Michael McCaul, incumbent U.S. representative

==== Results ====
Republican primary results
Party	Candidate	Votes	%
Republican	Michael McCaul (incumbent)	76,646	100.0
Total votes		76,646	100.0

=== Democratic primary ===
==== Candidates ====
===== Nominee =====
- Tawana Walter-Cadien, consultant, registered nurse, MMA Surgery supervisor, quality assurance director and nominee for this seat in 2012 & 2014

===== Eliminated in primary =====
- Scot Gallaher, energy consultant

==== Results ====
Democratic primary results
Party	Candidate	Votes	%
Democratic	Tawana Walter-Cadien	22,660	52.0
Democratic	Scot Gallaher	20,961	48.0
Total votes		43,621	100.0

=== General election ===
==== Predictions ====
Source	Ranking	As of
The Cook Political Report	Safe R	November 7, 2016
Daily Kos Elections	Safe R	November 7, 2016
Rothenberg	Safe R	November 3, 2016
Sabato's Crystal Ball	Safe R	November 7, 2016
RCP	Likely R	October 31, 2016

==== Results ====
Texas's 10th congressional district, 2016
Party	Candidate	Votes	%
Republican	Michael McCaul (incumbent)	179,221	57.3
Democratic	Tawana W. Cadien	120,170	38.5
Libertarian	Bill Kelsey	13,209	4.2
Total votes		312,600	100.0
Republican hold			

== District 11 ==
2016 Texas's 11th congressional district election

Nominee	Mike Conaway	Nicholas Landholt
Party	Republican	Libertarian
Popular vote	201,871	23,677
Percentage	89.5%	10.5%
- County results Conaway: 70–80% 80–90%
U.S. Representative before election
Mike Conaway
Republican
Elected U.S. Representative
Mike Conaway
Republican

The incumbent, Republican Mike Conaway, had represented the district since 2005. He was re-elected with 90% of the vote in 2014. The district had a PVI of R+31.

=== Republican primary ===
==== Candidates ====
===== Nominee =====
- Mike Conaway, incumbent U.S. representative

==== Results ====
Republican primary results
Party	Candidate	Votes	%
Republican	Mike Conaway (incumbent)	101,056	100.0
Total votes		101,056	100.0

=== Democratic primary ===
No Democrats filed to run.

=== Libertarian primary ===
==== Candidates ====
===== Nominee =====
- Nicholas Landholt

=== General election ===
==== Predictions ====
Source	Ranking	As of
The Cook Political Report	Safe R	November 7, 2016
Daily Kos Elections	Safe R	November 7, 2016
Rothenberg	Safe R	November 3, 2016
Sabato's Crystal Ball	Safe R	November 7, 2016
RCP	Safe R	October 31, 2016

==== Results ====
Texas's 11th congressional district, 2016
Party	Candidate	Votes	%
Republican	Mike Conaway (incumbent)	201,871	89.5
Libertarian	Nicholas Landholt	23,677	10.5
Total votes		225,548	100.0
Republican hold			

== District 12 ==
2016 Texas's 12th congressional district election
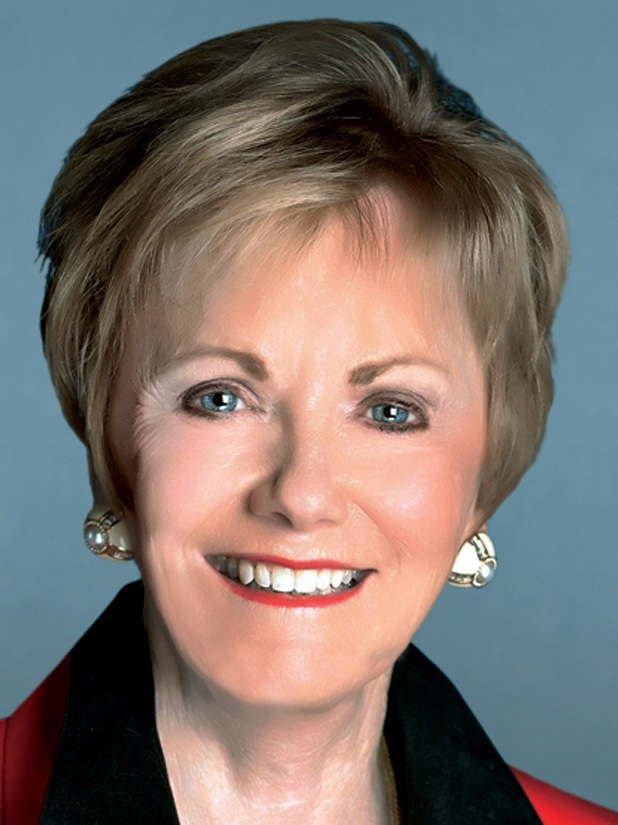

Nominee	Kay Granger	Bill Bradshaw
Party	Republican	Democratic
Popular vote	196,482	76,029
Percentage	69.4%	26.9%
- County results Granger: 60–70% 70–80%
U.S. Representative before election
Kay Granger
Republican
Elected U.S. Representative
Kay Granger
Republican

Incumbent Republican Kay Granger, who had represented the district since 1997, ran for re-election. She was re-elected with 71% of the vote in 2014. The district had a PVI of R+19.

=== Republican primary ===
==== Candidates ====
===== Nominee =====
- Kay Granger, incumbent U.S. representative

==== Results ====
Republican primary results
Party	Candidate	Votes	%
Republican	Kay Granger (incumbent)	87,329	100
Total votes		87,329	100

=== Democratic primary ===
==== Candidates ====
===== Nominee =====
- Bill Bradshaw

==== Results ====
Democratic primary results
Party	Candidate	Votes	%
Democratic	Bill Bradshaw	25,839	100.0
Total votes		25,839	100.0

=== General election ===
==== Endorsements ====
Bill Bradshaw (D)

Labor unions

- AFL-CIO

==== Predictions ====
Source	Ranking	As of
The Cook Political Report	Safe R	November 7, 2016
Daily Kos Elections	Safe R	November 7, 2016
Rothenberg	Safe R	November 3, 2016
Sabato's Crystal Ball	Safe R	November 7, 2016
RCP	Safe R	October 31, 2016

==== Results ====
Texas's 12th congressional district, 2016
Party	Candidate	Votes	%
Republican	Kay Granger (incumbent)	196,482	69.4
Democratic	Bill Bradshaw	76,029	26.9
Libertarian	Ed Colliver	10,604	3.7
Total votes		283,115	100.0
Republican hold			

== District 13 ==
2016 Texas's 13th congressional district election
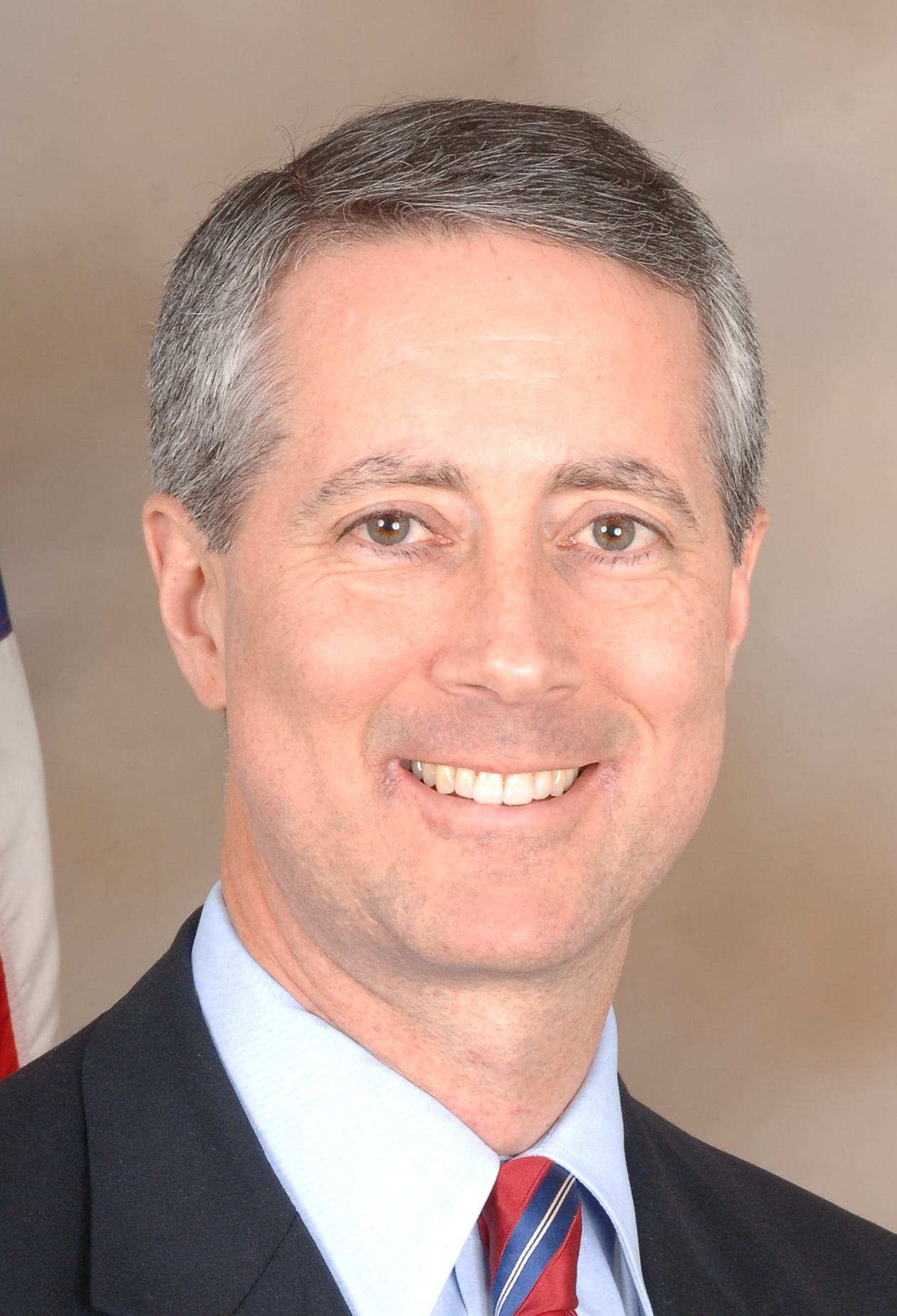

Nominee	Mac Thornberry	Calvin DeWeese
Party	Republican	Libertarian
Popular vote	199,050	14,725
Percentage	90.0%	6.6%
- County results Thornberry: 70–80% 80–90%
U.S. Representative before election
Mac Thornberry
Republican
Elected U.S. Representative
Mac Thornberry
Republican

Incumbent Republican Mac Thornberry, who had represented the district since 1995, ran for re-election. He was re-elected with 84% of the vote in 2014. The district had a PVI of R+32.

=== Republican primary ===
==== Candidates ====
===== Nominee =====
- Mac Thornberry, incumbent U.S. representative

==== Results ====
Republican primary results
Party	Candidate	Votes	%
Republican	Mac Thornberry (incumbent)	98,033	100.0
Total votes		98,033	100.0

=== Democratic primary ===
No Democrats filed to run.

=== General election ===
==== Predictions ====
Source	Ranking	As of
The Cook Political Report	Safe R	November 7, 2016
Daily Kos Elections	Safe R	November 7, 2016
Rothenberg	Safe R	November 3, 2016
Sabato's Crystal Ball	Safe R	November 7, 2016
RCP	Safe R	October 31, 2016

==== Results ====
Texas's 13th congressional district, 2016
Party	Candidate	Votes	%
Republican	Mac Thornberry (incumbent)	199,050	90.0
Libertarian	Calvin DeWeese	14,725	6.6
Green	H.F. "Rusty" Tomlinson	7,467	3.4
Total votes		221,242	100.0
Republican hold			

== District 14 ==
2016 Texas's 14th congressional district election
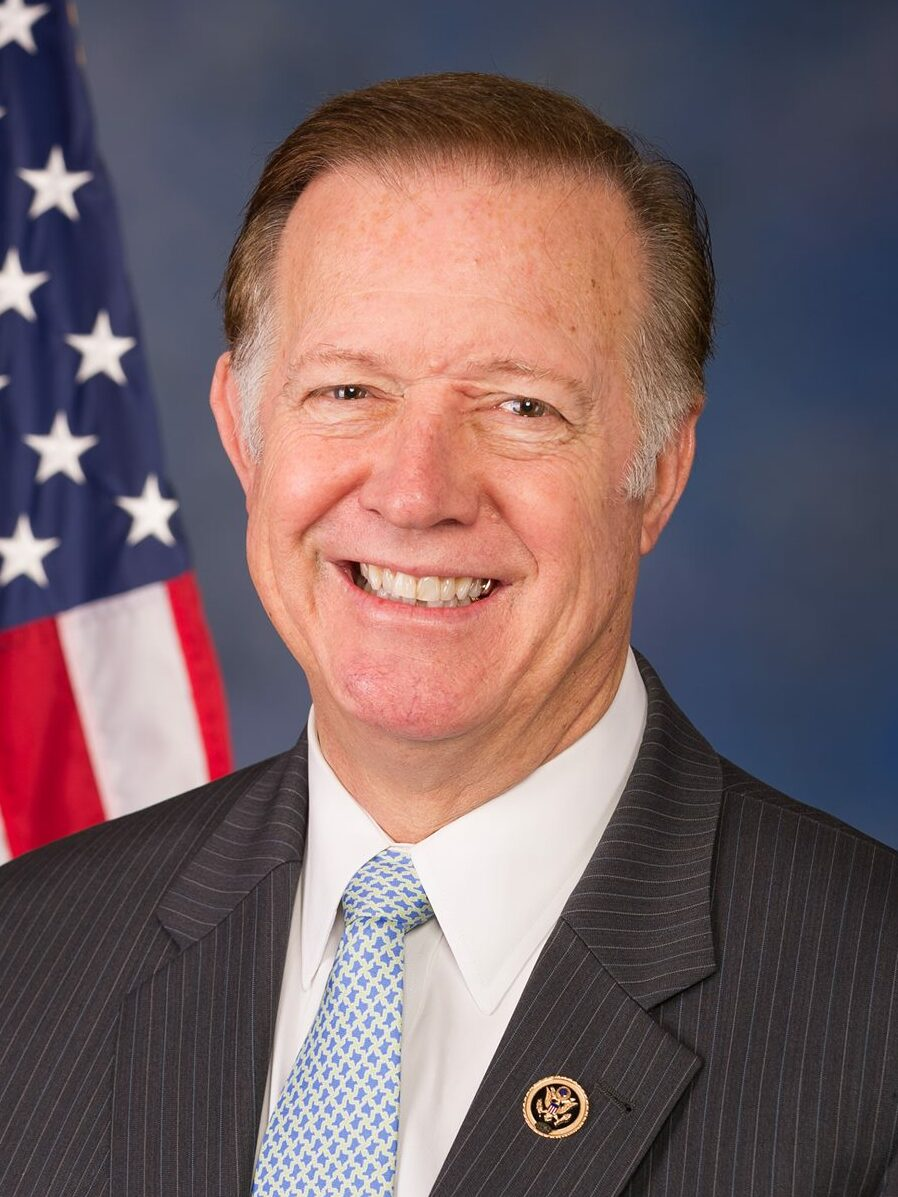

Nominee	Randy Weber	Michael Cole
Party	Republican	Democratic
Popular vote	160,631	99,054
Percentage	61.9%	38.1%
- County results Weber: 50–60% 60–70% 70–80%
U.S. Representative before election
Randy Weber
Republican
Elected U.S. Representative
Randy Weber
Republican

Incumbent Republican Randy Weber, who had represented the district since 2013, ran for re-election.

=== Republican primary ===
==== Candidates ====
===== Nominee =====
- Randy Weber, incumbent U.S. representative

===== Eliminated in primary =====
- Keith Casey, candidate for the 36th district in 2012

==== Results ====
Republican primary results
Party	Candidate	Votes	%
Republican	Randy Weber (incumbent)	57,869	84.0
Republican	Keith Casey	10,988	16.0
Total votes		68,857	100.0

=== Democratic primary ===
==== Candidates ====
===== Nominee =====
- Michael K. Cole, educator and nominee for this seat in 2014

==== Results ====
Democratic primary results
Party	Candidate	Votes	%
Democratic	Michael Cole	28,731	100.0
Total votes		28,731	100.0

=== General election ===
==== Endorsements ====
Michael Cole (D)

Labor unions

- AFL-CIO

==== Predictions ====
Source	Ranking	As of
The Cook Political Report	Safe R	November 7, 2016
Daily Kos Elections	Safe R	November 7, 2016
Rothenberg	Safe R	November 3, 2016
Sabato's Crystal Ball	Safe R	November 7, 2016
RCP	Likely R	October 31, 2016

==== Results ====
Texas's 14th congressional district, 2016
Party	Candidate	Votes	%
Republican	Randy Weber (incumbent)	160,631	61.9
Democratic	Michael Cole	99,054	38.1
Total votes		259,685	100.0
Republican hold			

== District 15 ==
2016 Texas's 15th congressional district election
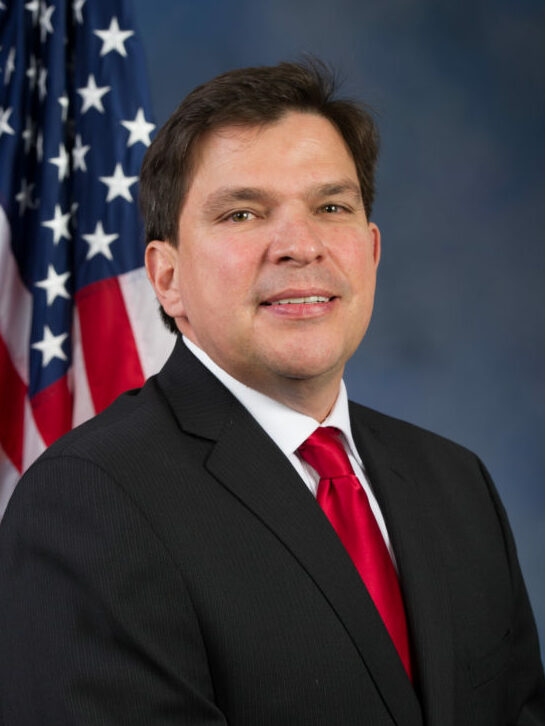

Nominee	Vicente González	Tim Westley
Party	Democratic	Republican
Popular vote	101,712	66,877
Percentage	57.3%	37.7%
- Precinct results Gonzalez: 40–50% 50–60% 60–70% 70–80% 80–90% >90% Westley: 40–50% 50–60% 60–70% 70–80% 80–90% >90%
U.S. Representative before election
Vicente González
Democratic
Elected U.S. Representative
Vicente González
Democratic

Incumbent Democrat Rubén Hinojosa, who had represented the district since 1997, decided to retire. He was re-elected in 2014 with 54% of the vote. The district had a PVI of D+5.

=== Democratic primary ===
No candidate received 50% of the vote, so the top two candidates, Vicente Gonzalez and Juan "Sonny" Palacios Jr., faced a run-off election, which Gonzalez won by a large margin.

==== Candidates ====
===== Nominee =====
- Vicente Gonzalez, attorney

===== Eliminated in primary =====
- Dolly Elizondo, former Hildago County Democratic Party chair
- Juan "Sonny" Palacios Jr., Edinburg school board member
- Joel Quintanilla, former Hidalgo County commissioner
- Ruben Ramirez, attorney and candidate for this seat in 2012
- Randy Sweeten, accountant

===== Withdrawn =====
- Johnny Partain, candidate for this seat in 2012

===== Declined =====
- Rubén Hinojosa, incumbent U.S. representative

==== Results ====
Democratic primary results
Party	Candidate	Votes	%
Democratic	Vicente Gonzalez	22,151	42.2
Democratic	Juan "Sonny" Palacios Jr.	9,913	19.0
Democratic	Dolly Elizondo	8,888	16.9
Democratic	Joel Quintanilla	6,152	11.7
Democratic	Ruben Ramirez	3,149	6.0
Democratic	Rance G "Randy" Sweeten	2,224	4.2
Total votes		52,477	100.0

==== Run-off results ====
Democratic primary results
Party	Candidate	Votes	%
Democratic	Vicente Gonzalez	16,071	65.7
Democratic	Juan "Sonny" Palacios Jr.	8,379	34.3
Total votes		24,450	100.0

=== Republican primary ===
No candidate received 50% of the vote, so the top two candidates, Tim Westley and Ruben Villarreal, faced a run-off election, which Westley won by 29 votes.

==== Candidates ====
===== Nominee =====
- Tim Westley, pastor

===== Eliminated in primary =====
- Xavier Salinas, Edinburg school board member
- Ruben Villarreal, former mayor of Rio Grande City

==== Results ====
Republican primary results
Party	Candidate	Votes	%
Republican	Tim Westley	13,164	45.0
Republican	Ruben Villarreal	9,349	32.0
Republican	Xavier Salinas	6,734	23.0
Total votes		29,247	100.0

==== Run-off results ====
Republican primary results
Party	Candidate	Votes	%
Republican	Tim Westley	1,384	50.5
Republican	Ruben Villarreal	1,355	49.5
Total votes		2,739	100.0

=== General election ===
==== Predictions ====
Source	Ranking	As of
The Cook Political Report	Safe D	November 7, 2016
Daily Kos Elections	Safe D	November 7, 2016
Rothenberg	Safe D	November 3, 2016
Sabato's Crystal Ball	Safe D	November 7, 2016
RCP	Safe D	October 31, 2016

==== Results ====
Texas's 15th congressional district, 2016
Party	Candidate	Votes	%
Democratic	Vicente Gonzalez	101,712	57.3
Republican	Tim Westley	66,877	37.7
Green	Vanessa S. Tijerina	5,448	3.1
Libertarian	Ross Lynn Leone	3,442	1.9
Total votes		177,479	100.0
Democratic hold			

== District 16 ==
2016 Texas's 16th congressional district election
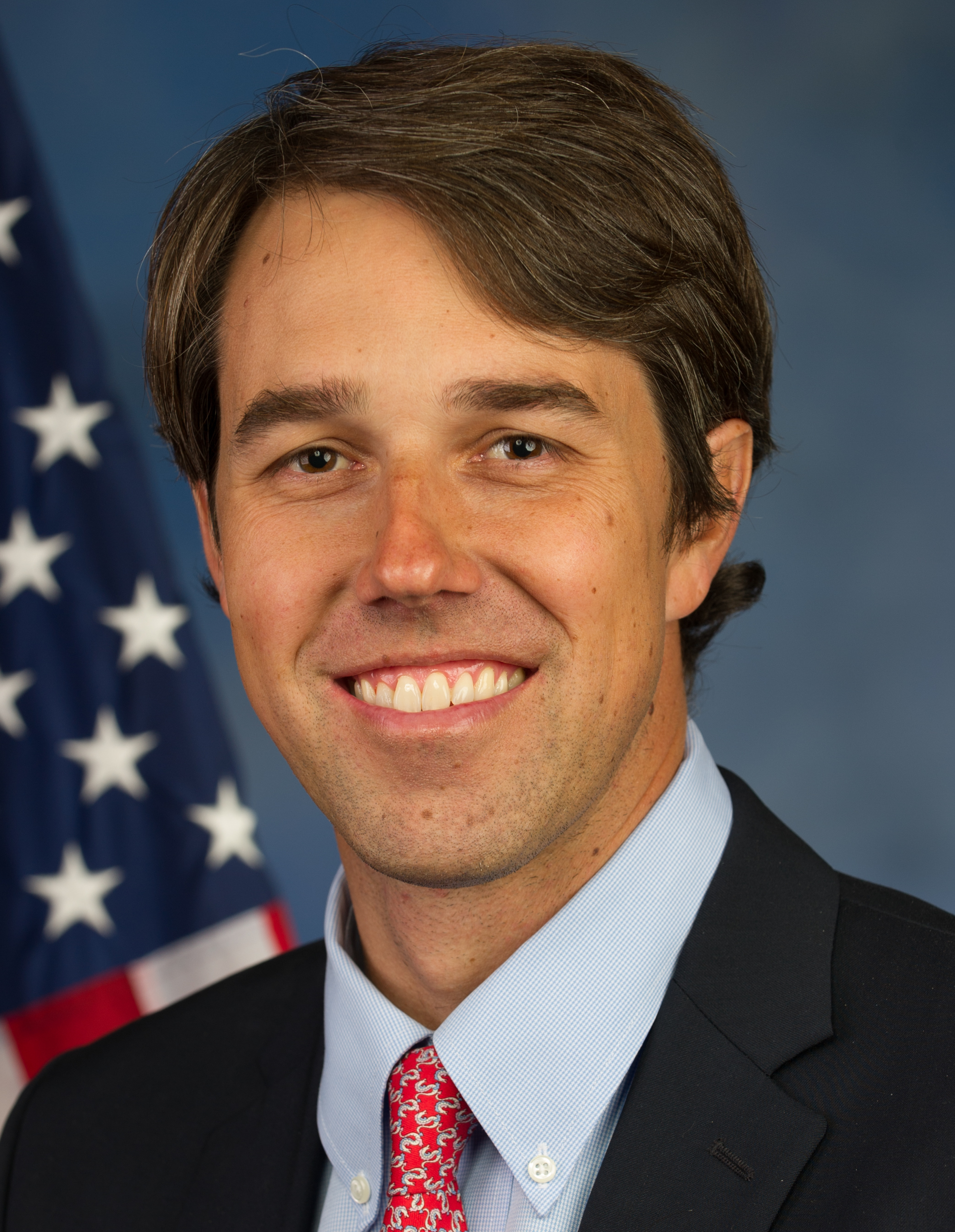

Nominee	Beto O'Rourke	Jaime Perez
Party	Democratic	Libertarian
Popular vote	150,228	17,491
Percentage	85.7%	10.0%
- County results O'rourke: 80–90%
U.S. Representative before election
Beto O'Rourke
Democratic
Elected U.S. Representative
Beto O'Rourke
Democratic

Incumbent Democrat Beto O'Rourke, who had represented the district since 2013, ran for re-election.

=== Democratic primary ===
==== Candidates ====
===== Nominee =====
- Beto O'Rourke, incumbent U.S. representative

===== Eliminated in primary =====
- Ben Mendoza, candidate for this seat in 2012

==== Results ====
Democratic primary results
Party	Candidate	Votes	%
Democratic	Beto O'Rourke (incumbent)	40,051	85.6
Democratic	Ben Mendoza	6,749	14.4
Total votes		46,800	100.0

=== General election ===
No Republican ran for this seat, leaving only Libertarian and Green party opposition.

==== Endorsements ====
Beto O'Rourke (D)

Organizations

- New Democrat Coalition

==== Predictions ====
Source	Ranking	As of
The Cook Political Report	Safe D	November 7, 2016
Daily Kos Elections	Safe D	November 7, 2016
Rothenberg	Safe D	November 3, 2016
Sabato's Crystal Ball	Safe D	November 7, 2016
RCP	Safe D	October 31, 2016

==== Results ====
Texas's 16th congressional district, 2016
Party	Candidate	Votes	%
Democratic	Beto O'Rourke (incumbent)	150,228	85.7
Libertarian	Jaime O. Perez	17,491	10.0
Green	Mary L. Gourdoux	7,510	4.3
Total votes		175,229	100.0
Democratic hold			

== District 17 ==
2016 Texas's 17th congressional district election
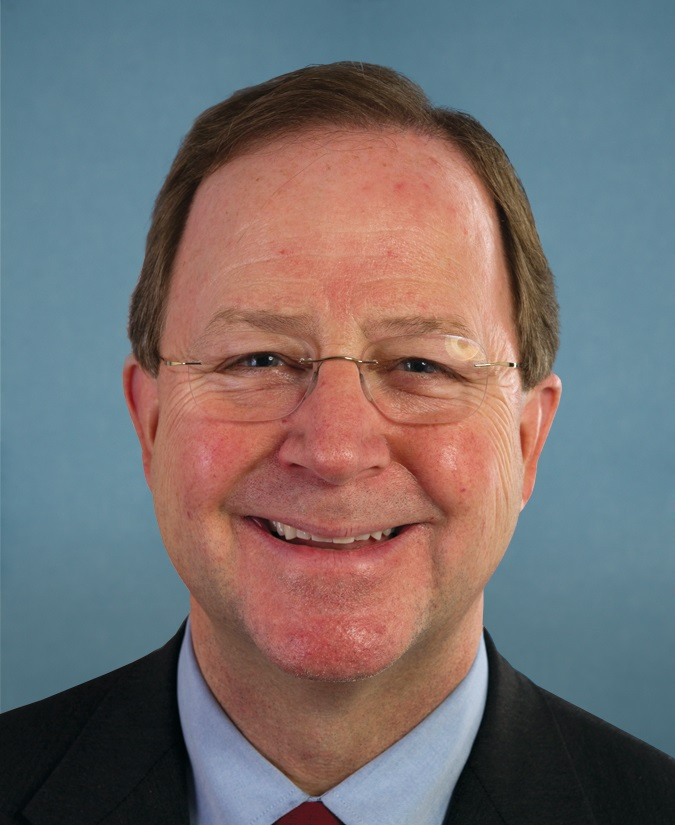

Nominee	Bill Flores	William Matta
Party	Republican	Democratic
Popular vote	149,417	86,603
Percentage	60.8%	35.2%
- County results Flores: 60–70% 70–80% 80–90% Matta: 60–70%
U.S. Representative before election
Bill Flores
Republican
Elected U.S. Representative
Bill Flores
Republican

Incumbent Republican Bill Flores, who had represented the district since 2011, ran for re-election.

=== Republican primary ===
==== Candidates ====
===== Nominee =====
- Bill Flores, incumbent U.S. representative

===== Eliminated in primary =====
- Ralph Patterson, former chair of the McLennan County Republican Party
- Kaleb Sims, businessman

==== Results ====
Republican primary results
Party	Candidate	Votes	%
Republican	Bill Flores (incumbent)	60,502	72.4
Republican	Ralph Patterson	15,411	18.5
Republican	Kaleb Sims	7,634	9.1
Total votes		83,547	100.0

=== Democratic primary ===
==== Candidates ====
===== Nominee =====
- William Matta

==== Results ====
Democratic primary results
Party	Candidate	Votes	%
Democratic	William Matta	27,639	100.0
Total votes		27,639	100.0

=== General election ===
==== Predictions ====
Source	Ranking	As of
The Cook Political Report	Safe R	November 7, 2016
Daily Kos Elections	Safe R	November 7, 2016
Rothenberg	Safe R	November 3, 2016
Sabato's Crystal Ball	Safe R	November 7, 2016
RCP	Safe R	October 31, 2016

==== Results ====
Texas's 17th congressional district, 2016
Party	Candidate	Votes	%
Republican	Bill Flores (incumbent)	149,417	60.8
Democratic	William Matta	86,603	35.2
Libertarian	Clark Patterson	9,708	4.0
Total votes		245,728	100.0
Republican hold			

== District 18 ==
2016 Texas's 18th congressional district election
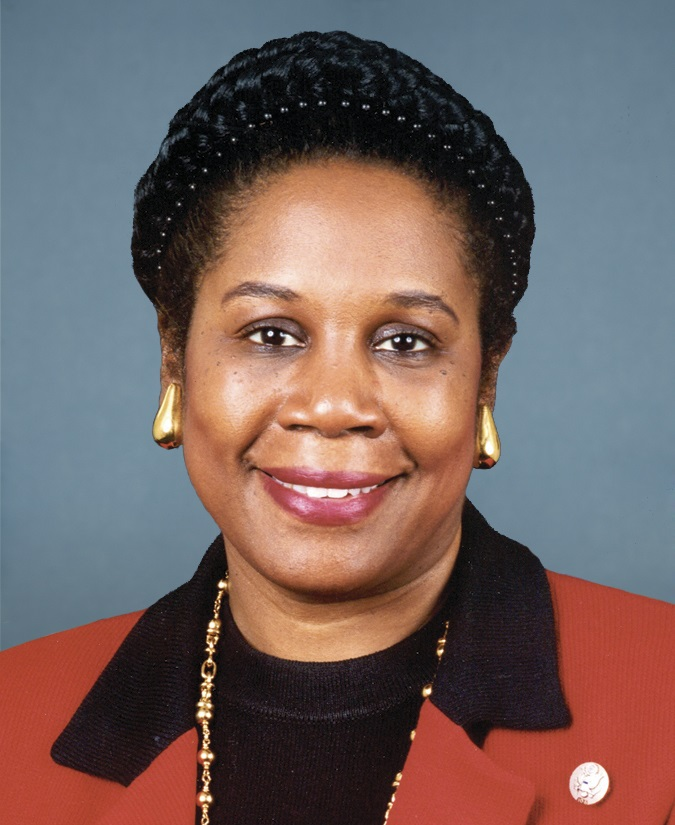

Nominee	Sheila Jackson Lee	Lori Bartley
Party	Democratic	Republican
Popular vote	150,157	48,306
Percentage	73.5%	23.6%
- County results Lee: 70–80%
U.S. Representative before election
Sheila Jackson Lee
Democratic
Elected U.S. Representative
Sheila Jackson Lee
Democratic

Incumbent, Democrat Sheila Jackson Lee, who had represented the district since 1995, ran for re-election.

=== Democratic primary ===
==== Candidates ====
===== Nominee =====
- Sheila Jackson Lee, incumbent U.S. representative

==== Results ====
Democratic primary results
Party	Candidate	Votes	%
Democratic	Sheila Jackson Lee (incumbent)	46,113	100.0
Total votes		46,113	100.0

=== Republican primary ===
==== Candidates ====
===== Nominee =====
- Lori Bartley, small business owner and certified mediator

===== Eliminated in primary =====
- Sharon Fisher, retired small business owner
- Reggie Gonzales,
- Ava Pate, cosmetologist

==== Results ====
No candidate achieved 50% of the vote, so Lori Bartley and Reggie Gonzales faced each other in a run-off, which Lori Bartley won by a margin of 58–42.

Republican primary results
Party	Candidate	Votes	%
Republican	Lori Bartley	5,691	33.7
Republican	Reggie Gonzales	5,587	33.1
Republican	Sharon Joy Fisher	4,414	26.1
Republican	Ava Pate	1,204	7.1
Total votes		16,896	100.0

==== Run-off results ====
Republican primary results
Party	Candidate	Votes	%
Republican	Lori Bartley	1,491	57.6
Republican	Reggie Gonzales	1,096	42.4
Total votes		2,587	100.0

=== General election ===
==== Endorsements ====
Sheila Jackson Lee (D)

Labor unions

- AFL-CIO

==== Predictions ====
Source	Ranking	As of
The Cook Political Report	Safe D	November 7, 2016
Daily Kos Elections	Safe D	November 7, 2016
Rothenberg	Safe D	November 3, 2016
Sabato's Crystal Ball	Safe D	November 7, 2016
RCP	Safe D	October 31, 2016

==== Results ====
Texas's 18th congressional district, 2016
Party	Candidate	Votes	%
Democratic	Sheila Jackson Lee (incumbent)	150,157	73.5
Republican	Lori Bartley	48,306	23.6
Green	Thomas Kleven	5,845	2.9
Total votes		204,308	100.0
Democratic hold			

== District 19 ==
2016 Texas's 19th congressional district election
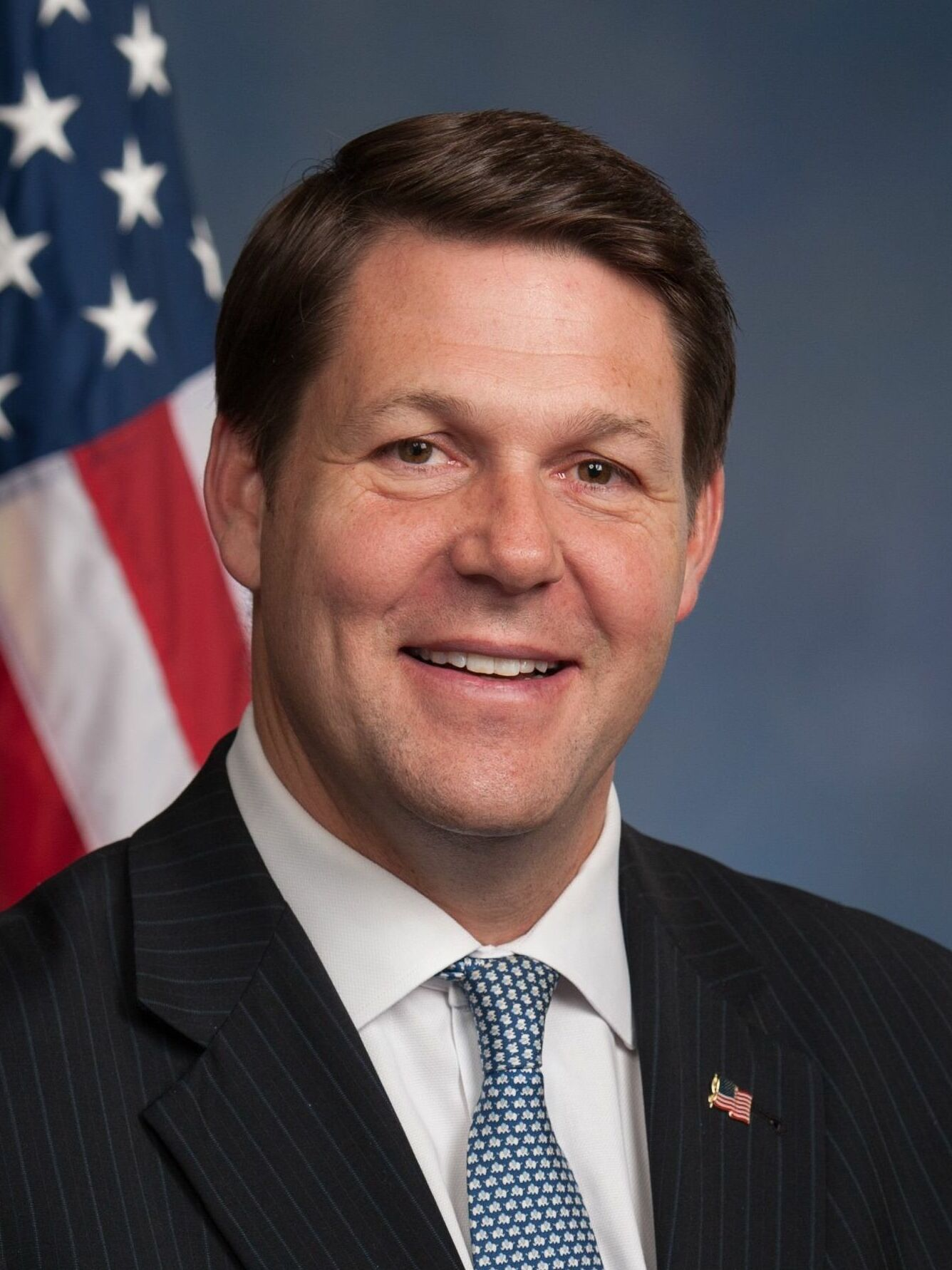

Nominee	Jodey Arrington	Troy Bonar
Party	Republican	Libertarian
Popular vote	176,314	17,376
Percentage	86.7%	8.5%
- County results Thornberry: 70–80% 80–90%
U.S. Representative before election
Randy Neugebauer
Republican
Elected U.S. Representative
Jodey Arrington
Republican

Incumbent Republican Randy Neugebauer, who had represented the district since 2003, opted to retire. He was re-elected in 2014 with 77 percent of the vote. The district had a PVI of R+26.

=== Republican primary ===
Lubbock Mayor Glen Robertson announced in January 2015 that he was considering running against Neugebauer in the 2016 Republican primary. He cited unhappiness with what he said was Neugebauer's failure to bolster the cotton industry. In March, Robertson said that he would not run for Congress and instead run once more for mayor.

After Neugebauer decided to retire, Robertson entered the congressional race and withdrew from consideration for another term as mayor.

==== Candidates ====
===== Nominee =====
- Jodey Arrington, former official in the George W. Bush administration, former vice chancellor at Texas Tech University and candidate for state senate in 2014

===== Eliminated in primary =====
- Jason Corley, business owner
- Greg Garrett, president and CEO of Platinum Bank
- John Key, veterinarian and retired US Army colonel
- Donald May, doctor
- Glen Robertson, mayor of Lubbock
- Michael Bob Starr, retired Air Force colonel
- DeRenda Warren, director of nursing at BrightStar

===== Withdrawn =====
- Don Parrish, farmer (endorsed Starr)

===== Declined =====
- Randy Neugebauer, incumbent U.S. representative

==== Endorsements ====
Jodey Arrington

Statewide officials

- Rick Perry, former governor of Texas (run-off)

==== Results ====
None of the nine candidates obtained a majority in the Republican primary on March 1. Robertson led the field but had to face a run-off challenge against Arrington.

Republican primary results
Party	Candidate	Votes	%
Republican	Glen Robertson	27,868	26.8
Republican	Jodey Arrington	27,013	25.9
Republican	Michael Bob Starr	22,303	21.4
Republican	Donald R. May	9,616	9.2
Republican	Greg Garrett	8,309	8.0
Republican	Jason Corley	2,558	2.5
Republican	DeRenda Warren	2,323	2.2
Republican	Don Parrish	2,197	2.1
Republican	John C. Key	1,959	1.9
Total votes		104,146	100.0

==== Run-off results ====
Arrington had trailed Robertson by fewer than one thousand votes in the first round, but he won the run-off.

Republican primary results
Party	Candidate	Votes	%
Republican	Jodey Arrington	25,322	53.7
Republican	Glen Robertson	21,832	46.3
Total votes		47,154	100.0

=== General election ===
==== Predictions ====
Source	Ranking	As of
The Cook Political Report	Safe R	November 7, 2016
Daily Kos Elections	Safe R	November 7, 2016
Rothenberg	Safe R	November 3, 2016
Sabato's Crystal Ball	Safe R	November 7, 2016
RCP	Safe R	October 31, 2016

==== Results ====
Texas's 19th congressional district, 2016
Party	Candidate	Votes	%
Republican	Jodey Arrington	176,314	86.7
Libertarian	Troy Bonar	17,376	8.5
Green	Mark Lawson	9,785	4.8
Total votes		203,475	100.0
Republican hold			

== District 20 ==
2016 Texas's 20th congressional district election
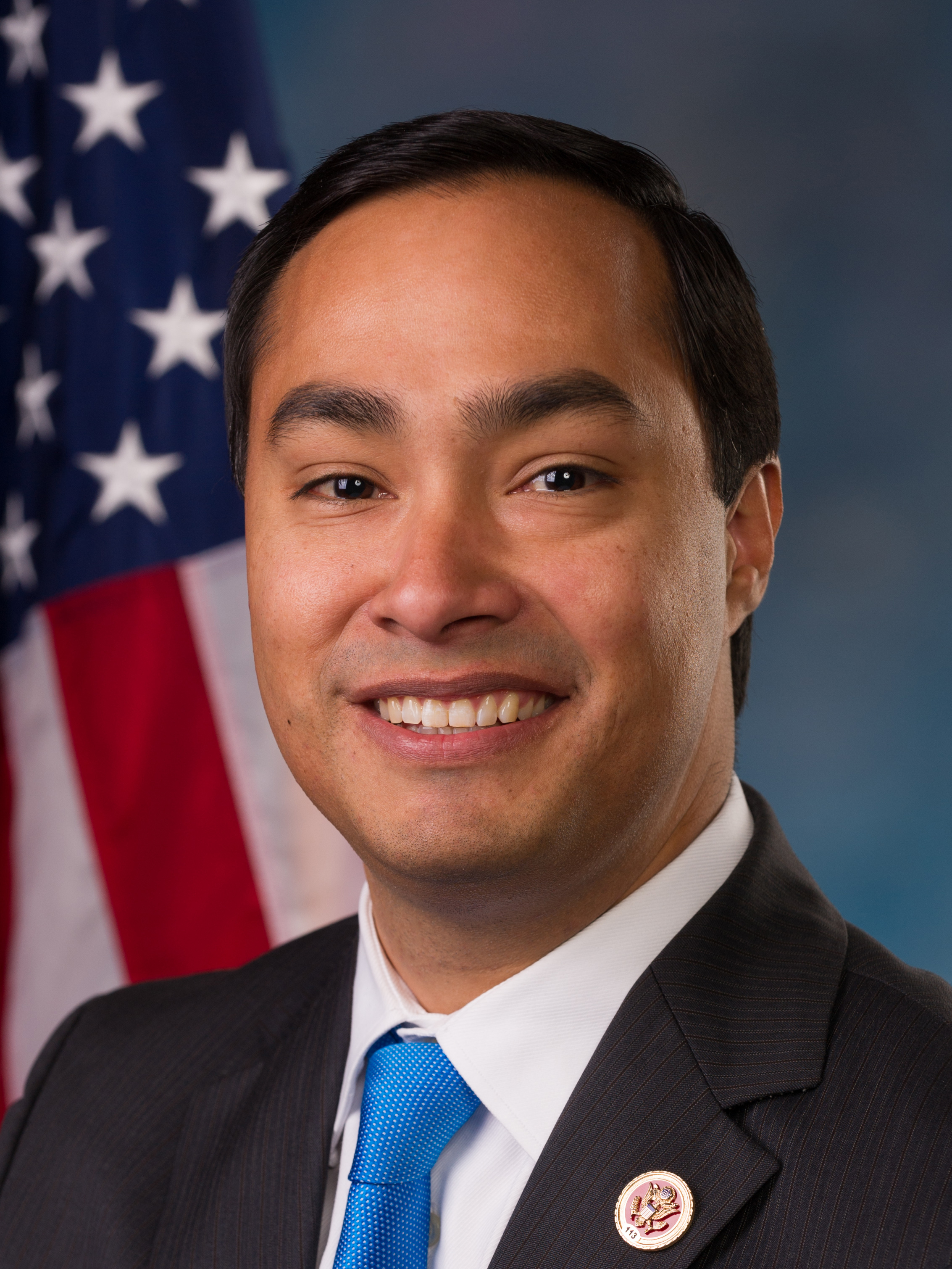

Nominee	Joaquín Castro	Jeffrey Blunt
Party	Democratic	Libertarian
Popular vote	149,640	29,055
Percentage	79.7%	15.5%
- County results Castro: 70–80%
U.S. Representative before election
Joaquín Castro
Democratic
Elected U.S. Representative
Joaquín Castro
Democratic

Incumbent Democrat Joaquín Castro, who had represented the district since 2013, ran for re-election. He was re-elected with 76% of the vote in 2014. The district had a PVI of D+6.

=== Democratic primary ===
==== Candidates ====
===== Nominee =====
- Joaquín Castro, incumbent U.S. representative

==== Results ====
Democratic primary results
Party	Candidate	Votes	%
Democratic	Joaquín Castro (incumbent)	42,163	100.0
Total votes		42,163	100.0

=== General election ===
==== Predictions ====
Source	Ranking	As of
The Cook Political Report	Safe D	November 7, 2016
Daily Kos Elections	Safe D	November 7, 2016
Rothenberg	Safe D	November 3, 2016
Sabato's Crystal Ball	Safe D	November 7, 2016
RCP	Safe D	October 31, 2016

==== Endorsements ====
Joaquin Castro (D)

Labor unions

- AFL-CIO

Organizations

- New Democrat Coalition

==== Results ====
Texas's 20th congressional district, 2016
Party	Candidate	Votes	%
Democratic	Joaquin Castro (incumbent)	149,640	79.7
Libertarian	Jeffrey C. Blunt	29,055	15.5
Green	Paul Pipkin	8,974	4.8
Total votes		187,669	100.0
Democratic hold			

== District 21 ==
2016 Texas's 21st congressional district election
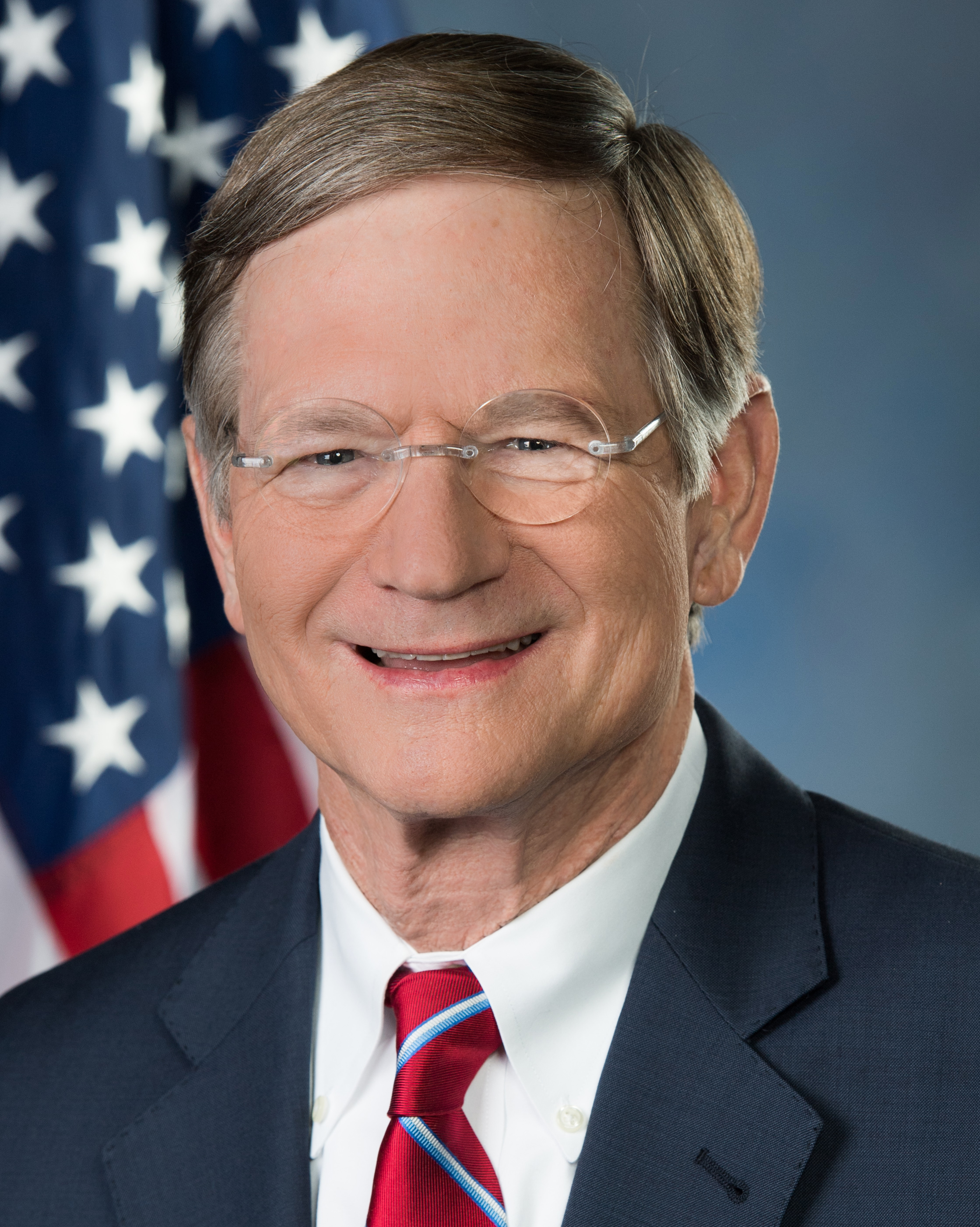

Nominee	Lamar Smith	Tom Wakely
Party	Republican	Democratic
Popular vote	202,967	129,765
Percentage	57.0%	36.5%
- County results Smith: 50–60% 70–80% 80–90% Wakely: 60–70%
U.S. Representative before election
Lamar Smith
Republican
Elected U.S. Representative
Lamar Smith
Republican

Incumbent Republican Lamar Smith, who had represented the district since 1987, ran for re-election. The district had a PVI of R+11.

=== Republican primary ===
==== Candidates ====
===== Nominee =====
- Lamar Smith, incumbent U.S. representative

===== Eliminated in primary =====
- Matt McCall, small business owner and candidate for this seat in 2014
- John Murphy, software engineer
- Todd Phelps, businessman

==== Results ====
Republican primary results
Party	Candidate	Votes	%
Republican	Lamar Smith (incumbent)	69,866	60.1
Republican	Matt McCall	33,624	28.9
Republican	Todd Phelps	6,597	5.7
Republican	John Murphy	6,200	5.3
Total votes		116,287	100.0

=== Democratic primary ===
==== Candidates ====
===== Nominee =====
- Thomas Wakely, hospice chaplain

===== Eliminated in primary =====
- Tejas Vakil, commercial real-estate company owner

==== Results ====
Democratic primary results
Party	Candidate	Votes	%
Democratic	Tom Wakely	29,632	59.0
Democratic	Tejas Vakil	20,595	41.0
Total votes		50,227	100.0

=== General election ===
==== Predictions ====
Source	Ranking	As of
The Cook Political Report	Safe R	November 7, 2016
Daily Kos Elections	Safe R	November 7, 2016
Rothenberg	Safe R	November 3, 2016
Sabato's Crystal Ball	Safe R	November 7, 2016
RCP	Safe R	October 31, 2016

==== Endorsements ====
Tom Wakely (D)

Labor unions

- AFL-CIO

==== Results ====
Texas's 21st congressional district, 2016
Party	Candidate	Votes	%
Republican	Lamar Smith (incumbent)	202,967	57.0
Democratic	Tom Wakely	129,765	36.5
Libertarian	Mark Loewe	14,735	4.1
Green	Antonio "Tony" Diaz	8,564	2.4
Total votes		356,031	100.0
Republican hold			

== District 22 ==
2016 Texas's 22nd congressional district election
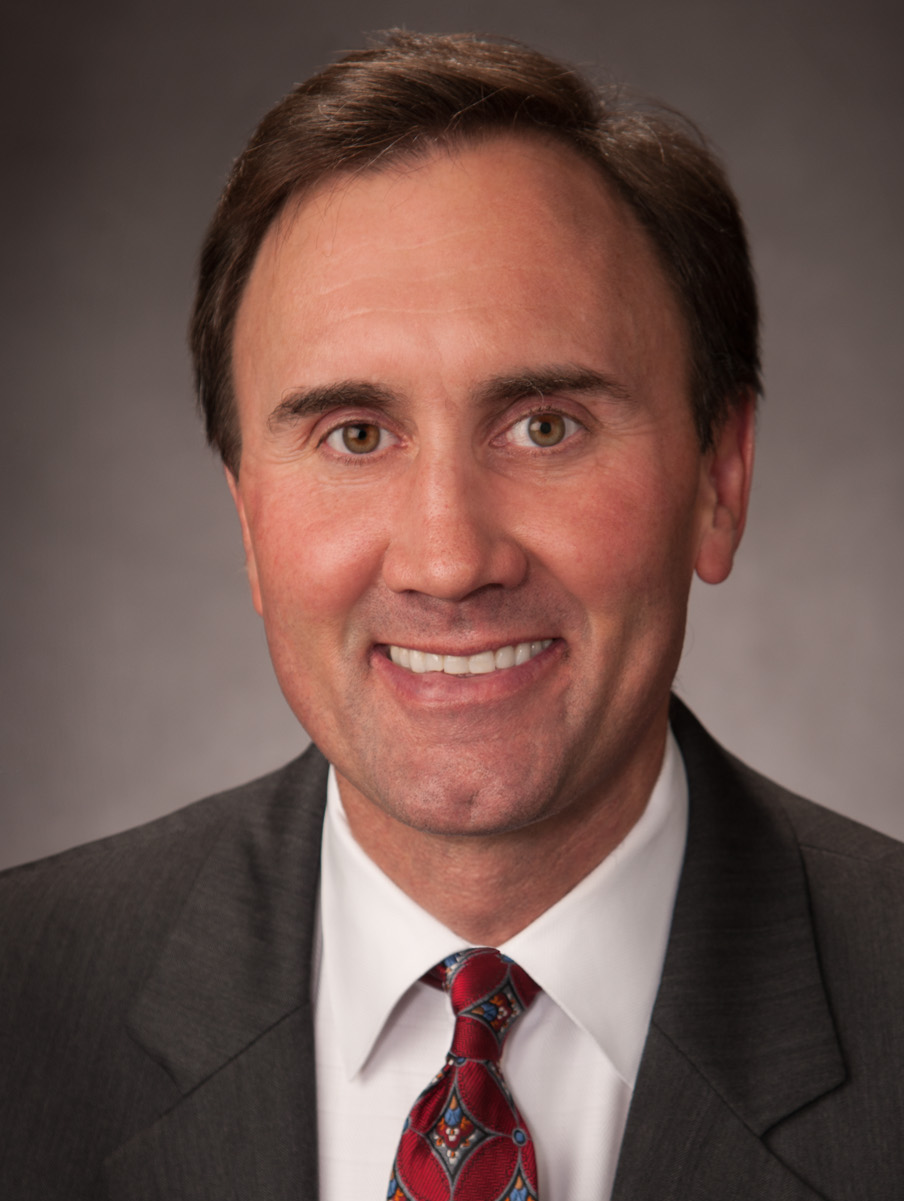

Nominee	Pete Olson	Mark Gibson
Party	Republican	Democratic
Popular vote	181,864	123,679
Percentage	59.5%	40.5%
- County results Olson: 50–60% 60–70%
U.S. Representative before election
Pete Olson
Republican
Elected U.S. Representative
Pete Olson
Republican

Incumbent Republican Pete Olson, who had represented the district since 2009, ran for re-election.

=== Republican primary ===
==== Candidates ====
===== Nominee =====
- Pete Olson, incumbent U.S. representative

==== Results ====
Republican primary results
Party	Candidate	Votes	%
Republican	Pete Olson (incumbent)	73,375	100.0
Total votes		73,375	100.0

=== Democratic primary ===
==== Candidates ====
===== Nominee =====
- Mark Gibson, attorney and candidate for this seat in 2014

===== Eliminated in primary =====
- A. R. Hassan

==== Results ====
Democratic primary results
Party	Candidate	Votes	%
Democratic	Mark Gibson	23,084	76.2
Democratic	A. R. Hassan	7,226	23.8
Total votes		30,310	100.0

=== General election ===
==== Predictions ====
Source	Ranking	As of
The Cook Political Report	Safe R	November 7, 2016
Daily Kos Elections	Safe R	November 7, 2016
Rothenberg	Safe R	November 3, 2016
Sabato's Crystal Ball	Safe R	November 7, 2016
RCP	Safe R	October 31, 2016

==== Results ====
Texas's 22nd congressional district, 2016
Party	Candidate	Votes	%
Republican	Pete Olson (incumbent)	181,864	59.5
Democratic	Mark Gibson	123,679	40.5
Total votes		305,543	100.0
Republican hold			

== District 23 ==
2016 Texas's 23rd congressional district election
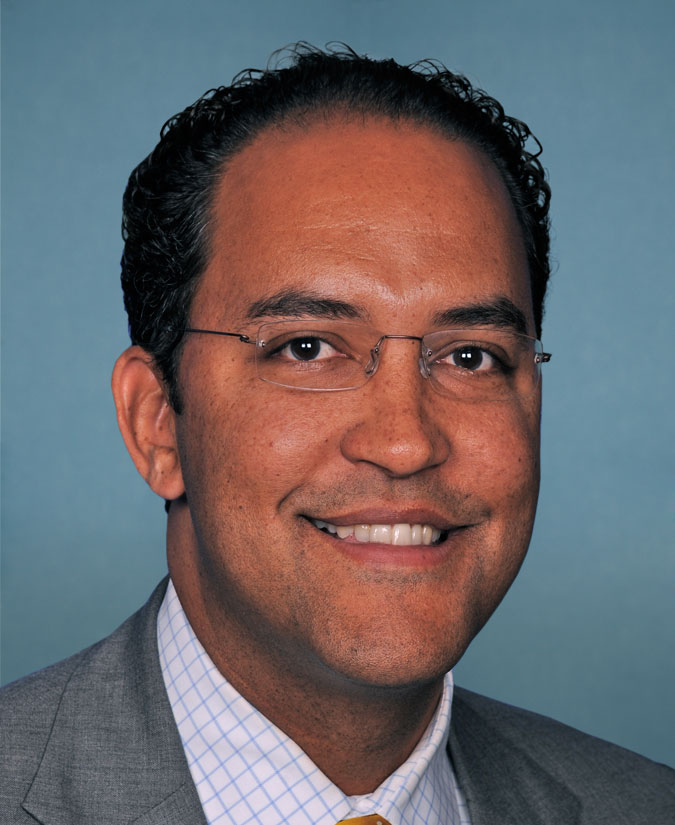

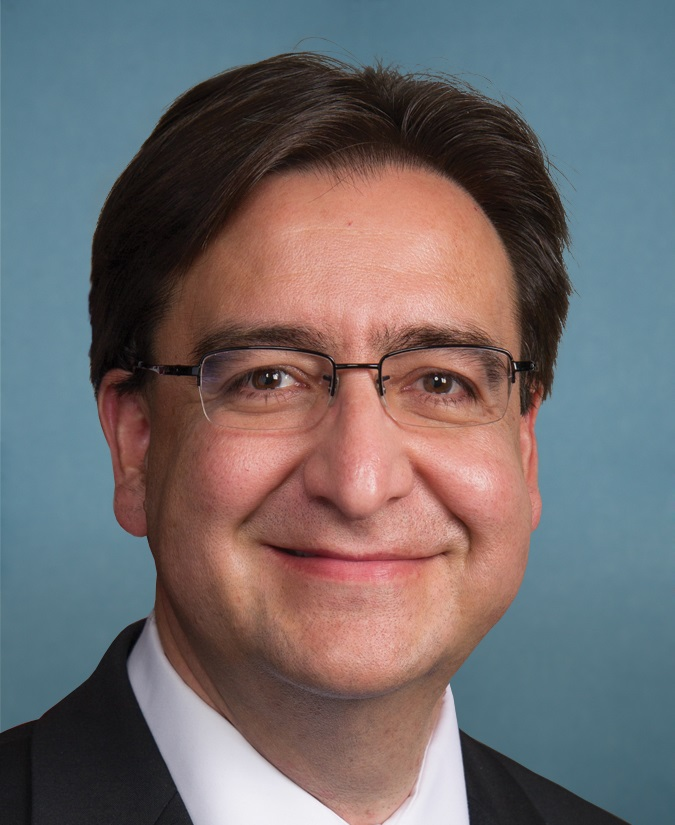
Nominee	Will Hurd	Pete Gallego
Party	Republican	Democratic
Popular vote	110,577	107,526
Percentage	48.3%	47.0%
- County results Hurd: 50–60% 60–70% 70–80% 80–90% Gallego: 50–60% 60–70% 70–80% 80–90%
U.S. Representative before election
Will Hurd
Republican
Elected U.S. Representative
Will Hurd
Republican

Incumbent Republican Will Hurd, who had represented the district since 2015, ran for re-election. He was elected in 2014, when he narrowly unseated the Democratic incumbent Pete Gallego. The district had a PVI of R+3.

=== Republican primary ===
==== Candidates ====
===== Nominee =====
- Will Hurd, incumbent U.S. representative

===== Eliminated in primary =====
- William Peterson

==== Results ====
Republican primary results
Party	Candidate	Votes	%
Republican	Will Hurd (incumbent)	39,870	82.2
Republican	William "Hart" Peterson	8,628	17.8
Total votes		48,498	100.0

=== Democratic primary ===
==== Candidates ====
===== Nominee =====
- Pete Gallego, former U.S. representative

===== Eliminated in primary =====
- Lee Keenen, doctor

==== Results ====
Democratic primary results
Party	Candidate	Votes	%
Democratic	Pete Gallego	43,223	88.4
Democratic	Lee Keenen	5,688	11.6
Total votes		48,911	100.0

=== General election ===
==== Campaign ====
Hurd publicly declined to endorse Donald Trump, explaining that Trump must earn his support. On May 6, 2016, Hurd said, “Until the presumptive nominee shows he can respect women and minorities and presents a clear plan to protect our homeland, I am going to reserve my endorsement. I hope in the next seven months he can show this because I am not supporting Hillary Clinton.”

==== Endorsements ====
Will Hurd (R)

Organizations

- National Republican Congressional Committee "Patriot" Program
Pete Gallego (D)

Labor unions

- AFL-CIO

Organizations

- Democratic Congressional Campaign Committee "Red to Blue" Program
- New Democrat Coalition

==== Debates ====
- Complete video of debate, October 27, 2016

==== Predictions ====
Source	Ranking	As of
The Cook Political Report	Tossup	November 7, 2016
Daily Kos Elections	Tossup	November 7, 2016
Rothenberg	Tossup	November 3, 2016
Sabato's Crystal Ball	Lean D (flip)	November 7, 2016
RCP	Tossup	October 31, 2016

==== Results ====
Texas's 23rd congressional district, 2016
Party	Candidate	Votes	%
Republican	Will Hurd (incumbent)	110,577	48.3
Democratic	Pete Gallego	107,526	47.0
Libertarian	Ruben S. Corvalan	10,862	4.7
Total votes		228,965	100.0
Republican hold			

== District 24 ==
2016 Texas's 24th congressional district election
- November 8, 2016
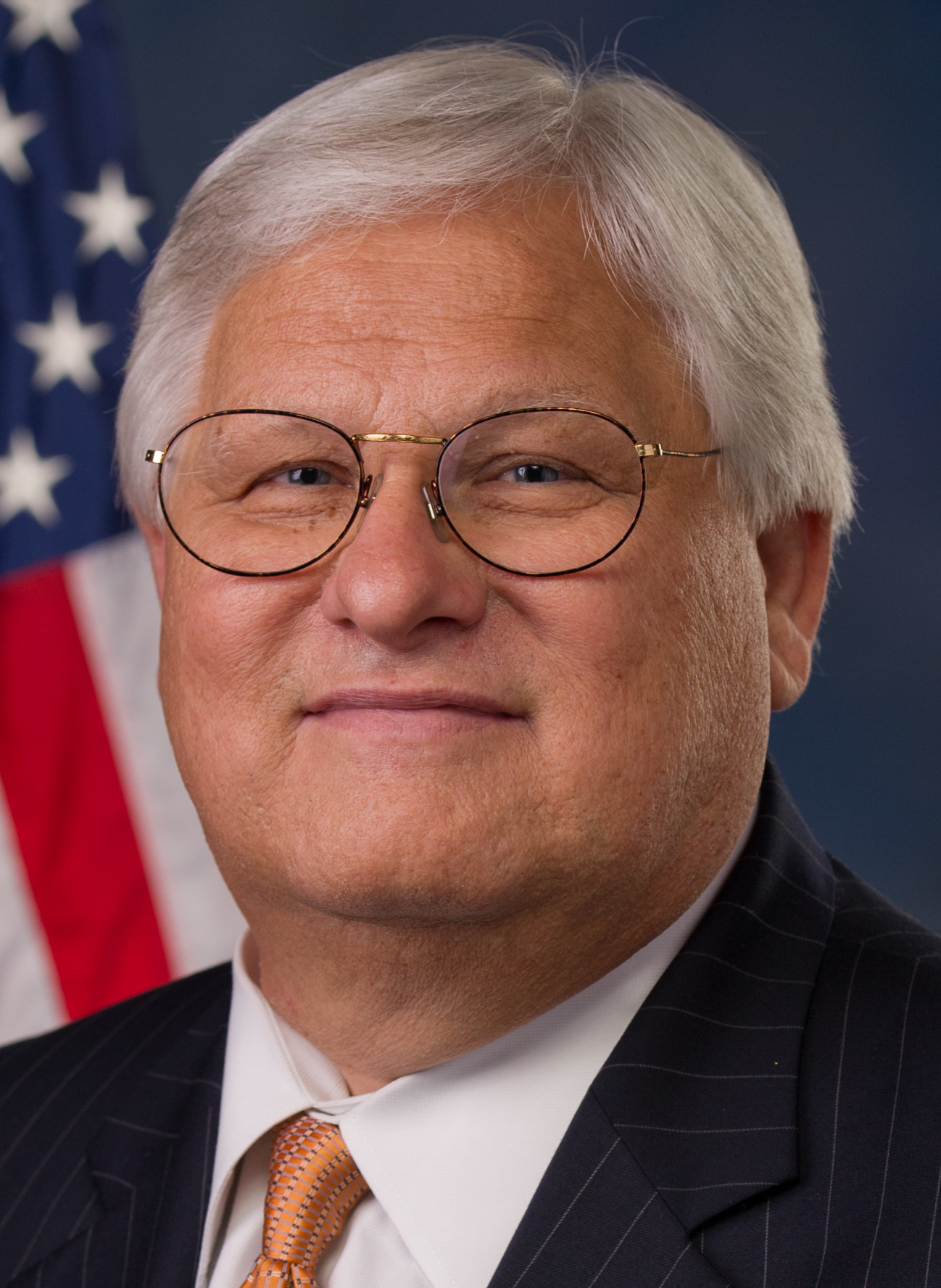

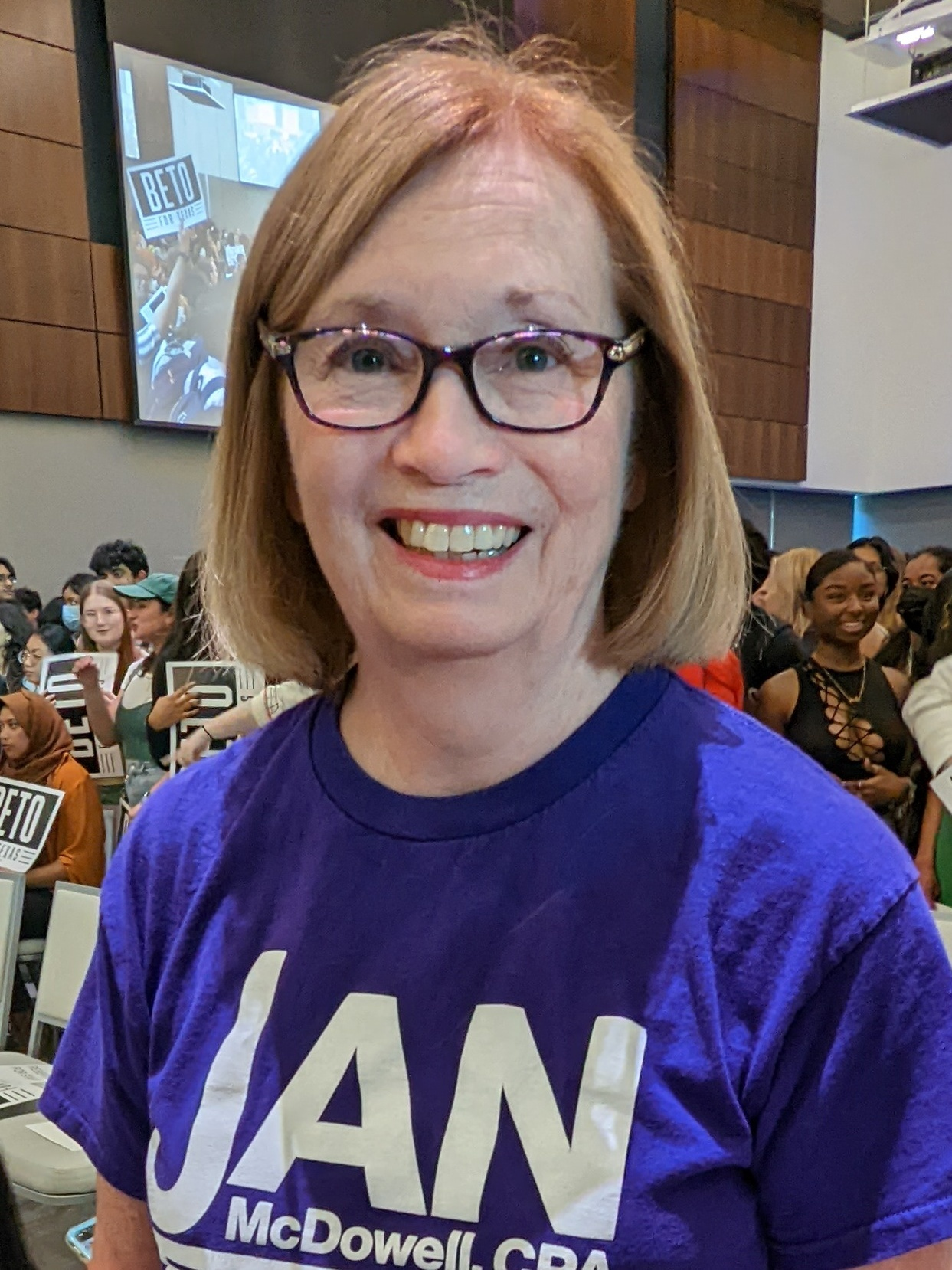
Nominee	Kenny Marchant	Jan McDowell
Party	Republican	Democratic
Popular vote	154,845	108,389
Percentage	56.2%	39.3%
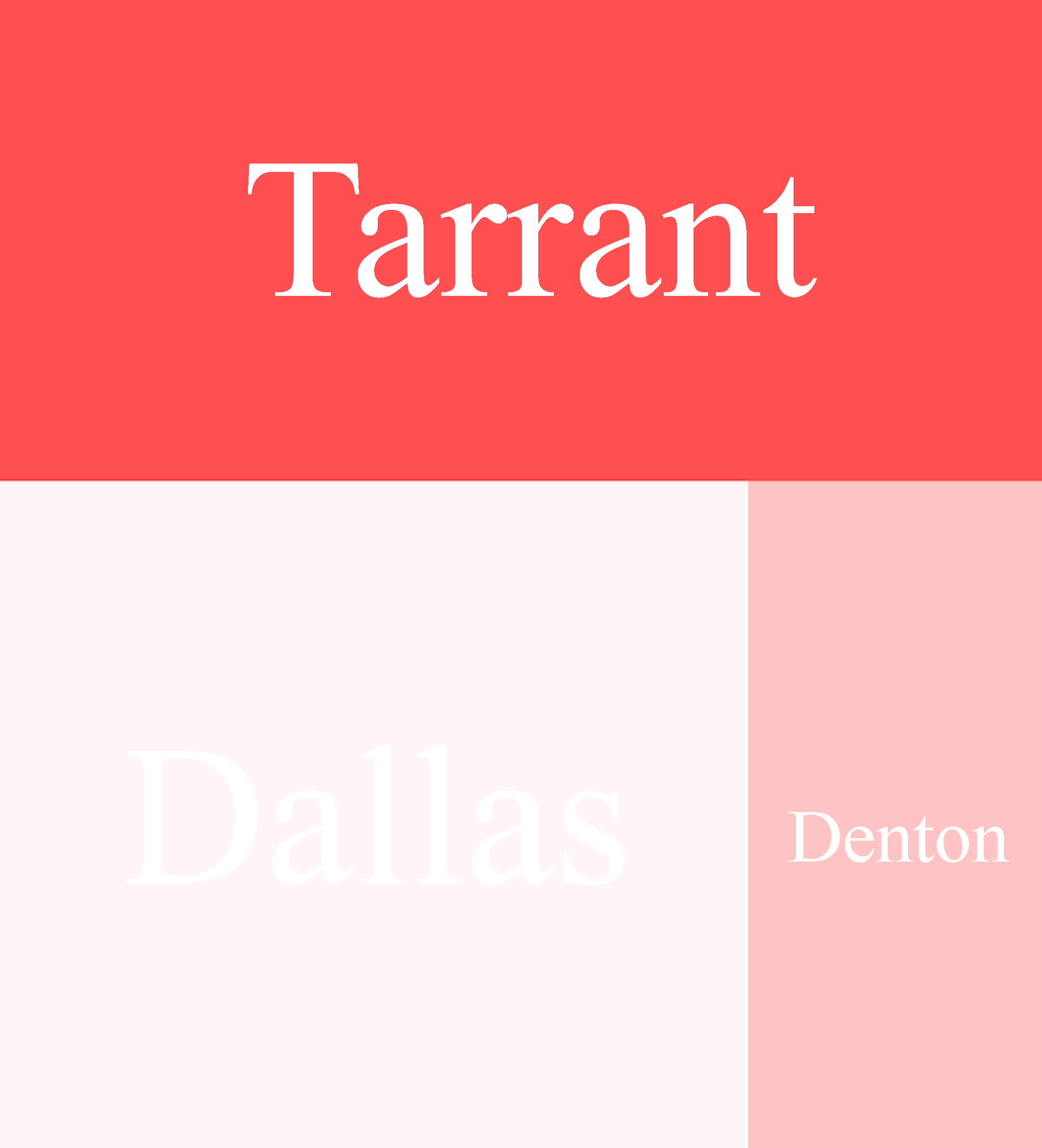
U.S. Representative before election
Kenny Marchant
Republican
Elected U.S. Representative
Kenny Marchant
Republican

Incumbent Republican Kenny Marchant, who had represented the district since 2013, ran for re-election. He was re-elected with 65% of the vote in 2014. The district had a PVI of R+13.

=== Republican primary ===
==== Candidates ====
===== Nominee =====
- Kenny Marchant, incumbent U.S. representative

==== Results ====
Republican primary results
Party	Candidate	Votes	%
Republican	Kenny Marchant (incumbent)	67,412	100.0
Total votes		67,412	100.0

=== Democratic primary ===
==== Candidates ====
===== Nominee =====
- Jan McDowell, accountant

==== Results ====
Democratic primary results
Party	Candidate	Votes	%
Democratic	Jan McDowell	27,803	100.0
Total votes		27,803	100.0

=== General election ===
==== Endorsements ====
Jan McDowell (D)

Labor unions

- AFL-CIO

==== Predictions ====
Source	Ranking	As of
The Cook Political Report	Safe R	November 7, 2016
Daily Kos Elections	Safe R	November 7, 2016
Rothenberg	Safe R	November 3, 2016
Sabato's Crystal Ball	Safe R	November 7, 2016
RCP	Safe R	October 31, 2016

==== Results ====
Texas's 24th congressional district, 2016
Party	Candidate	Votes	%
Republican	Kenny Marchant (incumbent)	154,845	56.2
Democratic	Jan McDowell	108,389	39.3
Libertarian	Mike Kolls	8,625	3.1
Green	Kevin McCormick	3,776	1.4
Total votes		275,635	100.0
Republican hold			

== District 25 ==
2016 Texas's 25th congressional district election
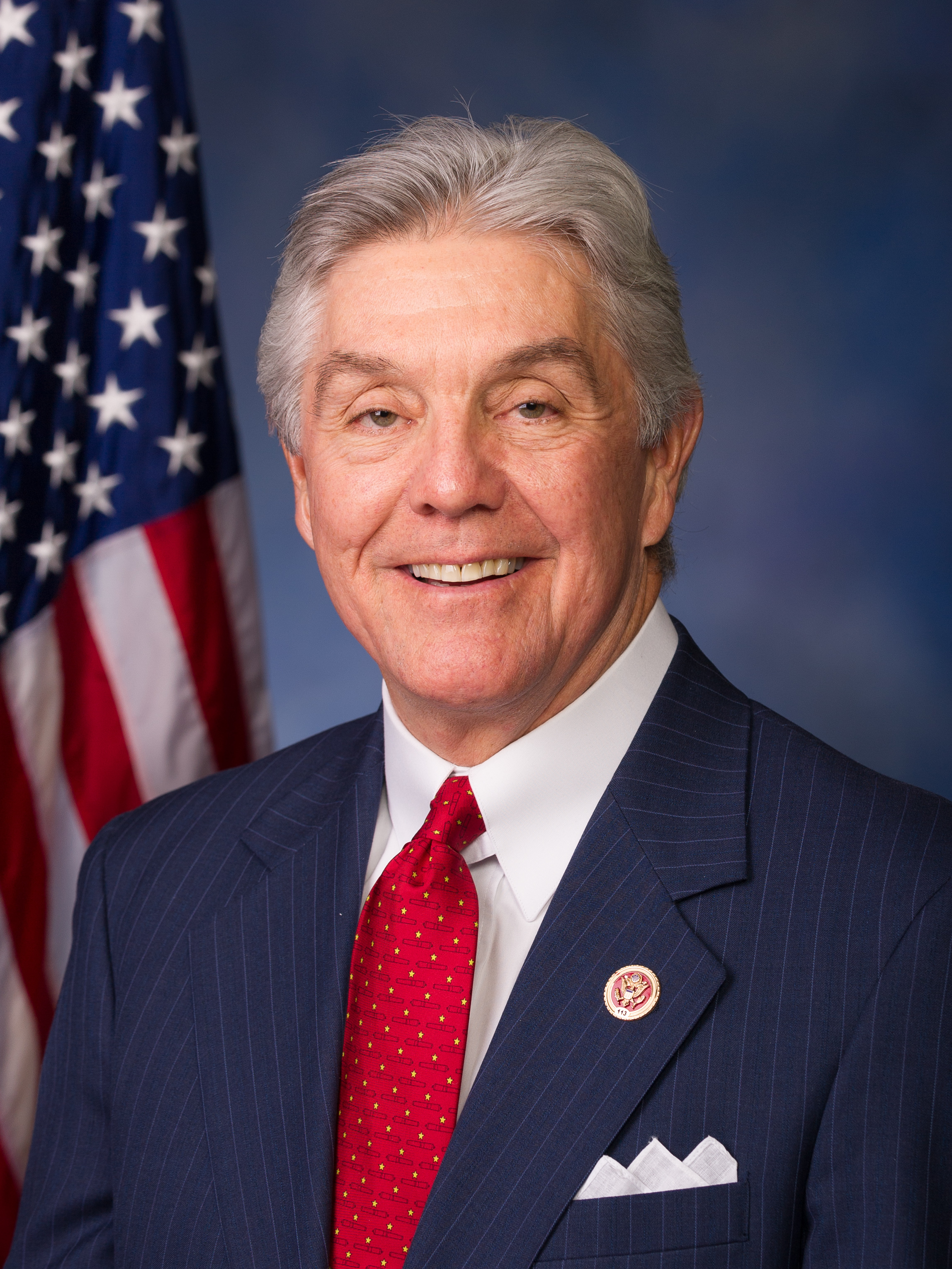

Nominee	Roger Williams	Kathi Thomas
Party	Republican	Democratic
Popular vote	180,988	117,073
Percentage	58.4%	37.7%
- County results Williams: 60–70% 70–80% 80–90% Thomas: 50–60% 60–70%
U.S. Representative before election
Roger Williams
Republican
Elected U.S. Representative
Roger Williams
Republican

Incumbent, Republican Roger Williams, who had represented the district since 2013, ran for re-election. He was re-elected with 60% of the vote in 2014. The district had a PVI of R+12.

=== Republican primary ===
==== Candidates ====
===== Nominee =====
- Roger Williams, incumbent U.S. representative

==== Results ====
Republican primary results
Party	Candidate	Votes	%
Republican	Roger Williams (incumbent)	83,965	100.0
Total votes		83,965	100.0

=== Democratic primary ===
==== Candidates ====
===== Nominee =====
- Kathi Thomas, small business owner, former precinct chair for Hays County Democrats and nominee for state senate in 2006

==== Results ====
Democratic primary results
Party	Candidate	Votes	%
Democratic	Kathi Thomas	44,633	100.0
Total votes		44,633	100.0

=== General election ===
==== Predictions ====
Source	Ranking	As of
The Cook Political Report	Safe R	November 7, 2016
Daily Kos Elections	Safe R	November 7, 2016
Rothenberg	Safe R	November 3, 2016
Sabato's Crystal Ball	Safe R	November 7, 2016
RCP	Safe R	October 31, 2016

==== Results ====
Texas's 25th congressional district, 2016
Party	Candidate	Votes	%
Republican	Roger Williams (incumbent)	180,988	58.4
Democratic	Kathi Thomas	117,073	37.7
Libertarian	Loren Marc Schneiderman	12,135	3.9
Total votes		310,196	100.0
Republican hold			

== District 26 ==
2016 Texas's 26th congressional district election
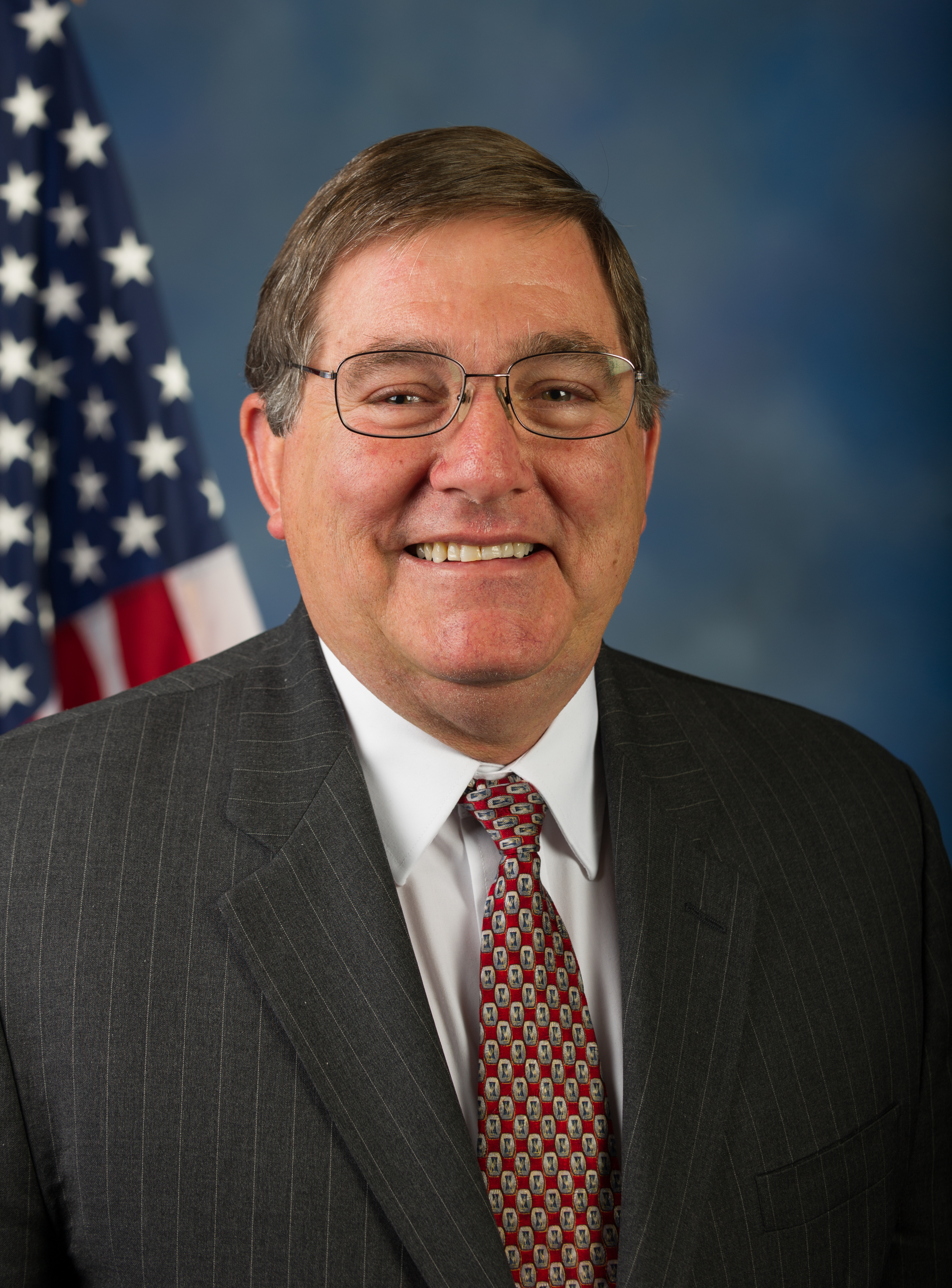

Nominee	Michael C. Burgess	Eric Mauck
Party	Republican	Democratic
Popular vote	211,730	94,507
Percentage	66.4%	29.6%
- County results Burgess: 50–60% 60–70% 70–80%
U.S. Representative before election
Michael C. Burgess
Republican
Elected U.S. Representative
Michael C. Burgess
Republican

Incumbent Republican Michael C. Burgess, who had represented the district since 2003, ran for re-election.

=== Republican primary ===
==== Candidates ====
===== Nominee =====
- Michael C. Burgess, incumbent U.S. representative

===== Eliminated in primary =====
- Micah Beebe, realtor
- Joel A. Krause, small business owner

==== Results ====
Republican primary results
Party	Candidate	Votes	%
Republican	Michael C. Burgess (incumbent)	73,607	79.4
Republican	Joel A. Krause	13,201	14.2
Republican	Micah Beebe	5,942	6.4
Total votes		92,750	100.0

=== Democratic primary ===
==== Candidates ====
===== Nominee =====
- Eric Mauck

==== Results ====
Democratic primary results
Party	Candidate	Votes	%
Democratic	Eric Mauck	24,816	100.0
Total votes		24,816	100.0

=== General election ===
==== Endorsements ====
Eric Mauck (D)

Labor unions

- AFL-CIO

==== Predictions ====
Source	Ranking	As of
The Cook Political Report	Safe R	November 7, 2016
Daily Kos Elections	Safe R	November 7, 2016
Rothenberg	Safe R	November 3, 2016
Sabato's Crystal Ball	Safe R	November 7, 2016
RCP	Safe R	October 31, 2016

==== Results ====
Texas's 26th congressional district, 2016
Party	Candidate	Votes	%
Republican	Michael C. Burgess (incumbent)	211,730	66.4
Democratic	Eric Mauck	94,507	29.6
Libertarian	Mark Boler	12,843	4.0
Total votes		319,080	100.0
Republican hold			

== District 27 ==
2016 Texas's 27th congressional district election
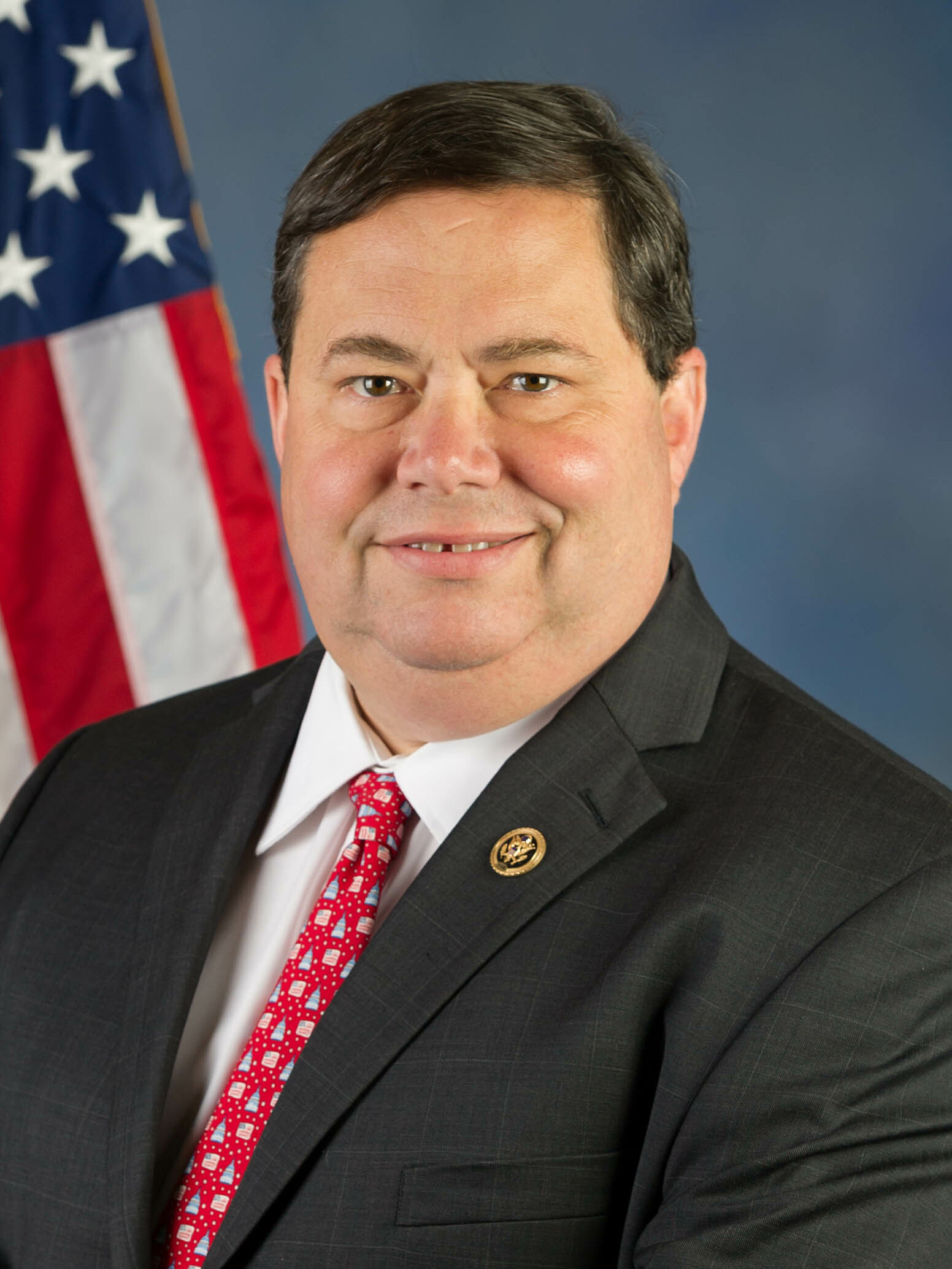

Nominee	Blake Farenthold	Raul Barrera
Party	Republican	Democratic
Popular vote	142,251	88,329
Percentage	61.7%	38.3%
- County results Farenthold: 50–60% 60–70% 70–80% 80–90%
U.S. Representative before election
Blake Farenthold
Republican
Elected U.S. Representative
Blake Farenthold
Republican

Incumbent Republican Blake Farenthold, who had represented the district since 2011, ran for re-election. He was re-elected in 2014 with 64% of the vote. The district had a PVI of R+13.

=== Republican primary ===
John Harrington, president and founder of firearms retailer Shield Tactical, announced a primary challenge of Farenthold in May 2015. The Texas Tribune reported that Harrington had the capacity to self-fund a race. In August 2015 he announced that he was withdrawing because of lingering effects of a motorcycle crash.

==== Candidates ====
===== Nominee =====
- Blake Farenthold, incumbent U.S. representative

===== Eliminated in primary =====
- Gregg Deeb, retired Marine lieutenant colonel

===== Withdrawn =====
- John Harrington, president and founder of firearms retailer Shield Tactical

==== Results ====
Republican primary results
Party	Candidate	Votes	%
Republican	Blake Farenthold (incumbent)	42,195	55.9
Republican	Gregg Deeb	33,280	44.1
Total votes		75,475	100.0

=== Democratic primary ===
==== Candidates ====
===== Nominee =====
- Raul Barrera, court security officer at Corpus Christi's Federal Courthouse

===== Eliminated in primary =====
- Ray Madrigal, business owner
- Wayne Raasch, candidate for state representative in 2010

===== Declined =====
- Nelda Martinez, mayor of Corpus Christi
- Solomon Ortiz Jr., former state representative

==== Results ====
Democratic primary results
Party	Candidate	Votes	%
Democratic	Raul (Roy) Barrera	15,939	50.3
Democratic	Ray Madrigal	11,157	35.2
Democratic	Wayne Raasch	4,570	14.5
Total votes		31,666	100.0

=== General election ===
==== Predictions ====
Source	Ranking	As of
The Cook Political Report	Safe R	November 7, 2016
Daily Kos Elections	Safe R	November 7, 2016
Rothenberg	Safe R	November 3, 2016
Sabato's Crystal Ball	Safe R	November 7, 2016
RCP	Safe R	October 31, 2016

==== Results ====
Texas's 27th congressional district, 2016
Party	Candidate	Votes	%
Republican	Blake Farenthold (incumbent)	142,251	61.7
Democratic	Raul (Roy) Barrera	88,329	38.3
Total votes		230,580	100.0
Republican hold			

== District 28 ==
2016 Texas's 28th congressional district election
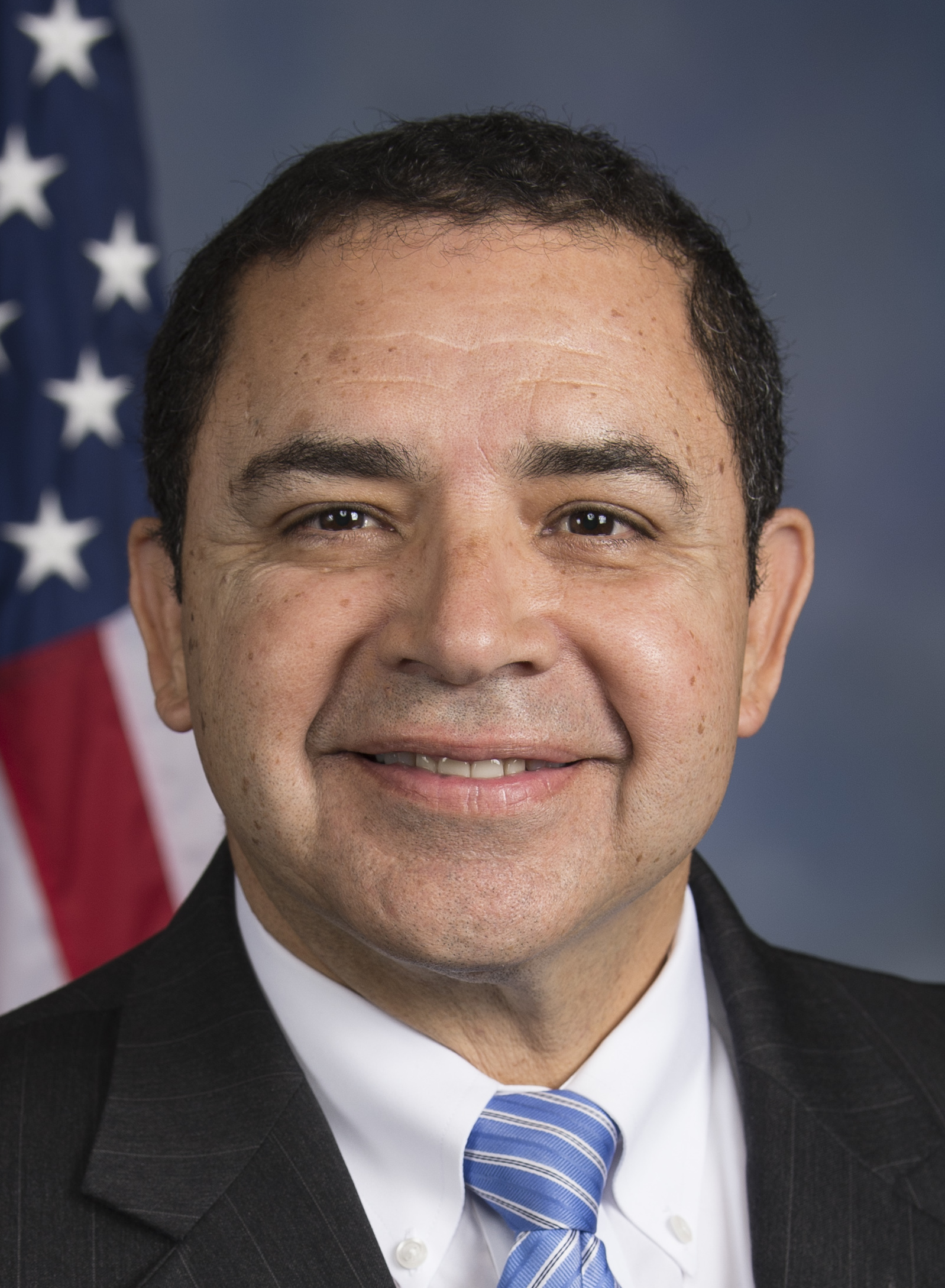

Nominee	Henry Cuellar	Zeffen Hardin
Party	Democratic	Republican
Popular vote	122,086	57,740
Percentage	66.2%	31.3%
- County results Cuellar: 50–60% 70–80% 80–90% Hardin: 50–60% 60–70% 70–80%
U.S. Representative before election
Henry Cuellar
Democratic
Elected U.S. Representative
Henry Cuellar
Democratic

Incumbent Democrat Henry Cuellar, who had represented the district since 2005, ran for re-election.

=== Democratic primary ===
==== Candidates ====
===== Nominee =====
- Henry Cuellar, incumbent U.S. representative

===== Eliminated in primary =====
- William Hayward, ostrich rancher and Republican nominee for this seat in 2012

==== Results ====
Democratic primary results
Party	Candidate	Votes	%
Democratic	Henry Cuellar (incumbent)	49,993	89.8
Democratic	William R. Hayward	5,683	10.2
Total votes		55,676	100.0

=== Republican primary ===
==== Candidates ====
===== Nominee =====
- Zeffen Hardin, Marine Corps veteran

==== Results ====
Republican primary results
Party	Candidate	Votes	%
Republican	Zeffen Hardin	21,614	100.0
Total votes		21,614	100.0

=== General election ===
==== Endorsements ====
Henry Cuellar (D)

Organizations

- New Democrat Coalition

==== Predictions ====
Source	Ranking	As of
The Cook Political Report	Safe D	November 7, 2016
Daily Kos Elections	Safe D	November 7, 2016
Rothenberg	Safe D	November 3, 2016
Sabato's Crystal Ball	Safe D	November 7, 2016
RCP	Safe D	October 31, 2016

==== Results ====
Texas's 28th congressional district, 2016
Party	Candidate	Votes	%
Democratic	Henry Cuellar (incumbent)	122,086	66.2
Republican	Zeffen Hardin	57,740	31.3
Green	Michael D. Cary	4,616	2.5
Total votes		184,442	100.0
Democratic hold			

== District 29 ==
2016 Texas's 29th congressional district election
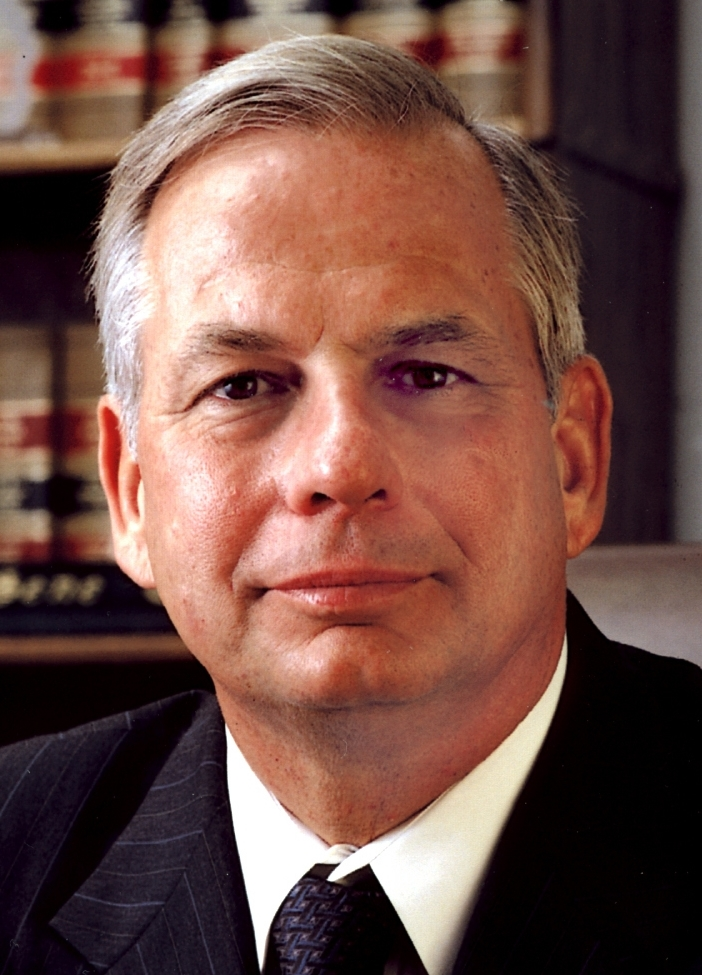

Nominee	Gene Green	Julio Garza
Party	Democratic	Republican
Popular vote	95,649	31,646
Percentage	72.5%	24.0%
- County results Green: 70–80%
U.S. Representative before election
Gene Green
Democratic
Elected U.S. Representative
Gene Green
Democratic

Incumbent Democrat Gene Green, who had represented the district since 1993, ran for re-election.

=== Democratic primary ===
==== Candidates ====
===== Nominee =====
- Gene Green, incumbent U.S. representative

===== Eliminated in primary =====
- Adrian Garcia, former sheriff of Harris County
- Dominique Garcia, small business owner and real estate agent

==== Results ====
Democratic primary results
Party	Candidate	Votes	%
Democratic	Gene Green (incumbent)	17,814	57.4
Democratic	Adrian Garcia	11,972	38.6
Democratic	Dominique Garcia	1,224	4.0
Total votes		31,010	100.0

=== Republican primary ===
==== Candidates ====
===== Nominee =====
- Julio Garza, insurance agent

===== Eliminated in primary =====
- Robert Schafranek

==== Results ====
Republican primary results
Party	Candidate	Votes	%
Republican	Julio Garza	7,421	59.1
Republican	Robert Schafranek	5,139	40.9
Total votes		12,560	100.0

=== General election ===
==== Predictions ====
Source	Ranking	As of
The Cook Political Report	Safe D	November 7, 2016
Daily Kos Elections	Safe D	November 7, 2016
Rothenberg	Safe D	November 3, 2016
Sabato's Crystal Ball	Safe D	November 7, 2016
RCP	Safe D	October 31, 2016

==== Endorsements ====
Gene Green (D)

Labor unions

- AFL-CIO

==== Results ====
Texas's 29th congressional district, 2016
Party	Candidate	Votes	%
Democratic	Gene Green (incumbent)	95,649	72.5
Republican	Julio Garza	31,646	24.0
Libertarian	N. Ruben Perez	3,234	2.4
Green	James Partsch-Galvan	1,453	1.1
Total votes		131,982	100.0
Democratic hold			

== District 30 ==
2016 Texas's 30th congressional district election
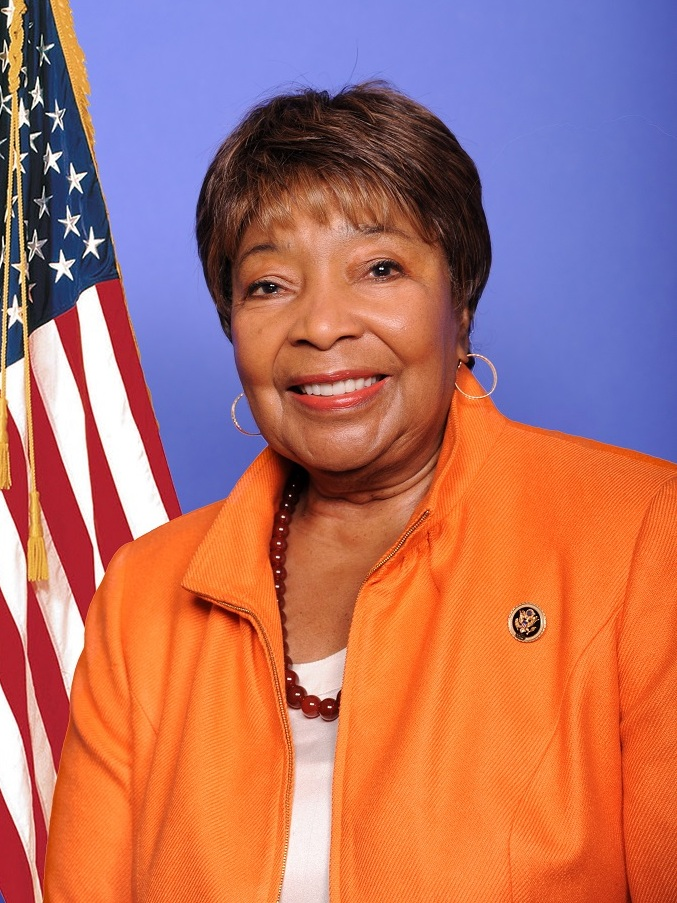

Nominee	Eddie Bernice Johnson	Charles Lingerfelt
Party	Democratic	Republican
Popular vote	170,502	41,518
Percentage	77.9%	19.0%
- County results Johnson: 70–80%
U.S. Representative before election
Eddie Bernice Johnson
Democratic
Elected U.S. Representative
Eddie Bernice Johnson
Democratic

Incumbent Democrat Eddie Bernice Johnson, who had represented the district since 1993, ran for re-election.

=== Democratic primary ===
==== Candidates ====
===== Nominee =====
- Eddie Bernice Johnson, incumbent U.S. representative

===== Eliminated in primary =====
- Barbara Mallory Caraway, former state representative and candidate for this seat in 2012 and 2014
- Brandon J. Vance, admissions counselor

==== Results ====
Democratic primary results
Party	Candidate	Votes	%
Democratic	Eddie Bernice Johnson (incumbent)	44,527	69.4
Democratic	Barbara Mallory Caraway	15,273	23.8
Democratic	Brandon J. Vance	4,339	6.8
Total votes		64,139	100.0

=== Republican primary ===
==== Candidates ====
===== Nominee =====
- Charles Lingerfelt, teacher and principal

==== Results ====
Republican primary results
Party	Candidate	Votes	%
Republican	Charles Lingerfelt	14,234	100.0
Total votes		14,234	100.0

=== General election ===
==== Predictions ====
Source	Ranking	As of
The Cook Political Report	Safe D	November 7, 2016
Daily Kos Elections	Safe D	November 7, 2016
Rothenberg	Safe D	November 3, 2016
Sabato's Crystal Ball	Safe D	November 7, 2016
RCP	Safe D	October 31, 2016

==== Results ====
Texas's 30th congressional district, 2016
Party	Candidate	Votes	%
Democratic	Eddie Bernice Johnson (incumbent)	170,502	77.9
Republican	Charles Lingerfelt	41,518	19.0
Libertarian	Jarrett R. Woods	4,753	2.2
Green	Thom Prentice	2,053	0.9
Total votes		218,826	100.0
Democratic hold			

== District 31 ==
2016 Texas's 31st congressional district election
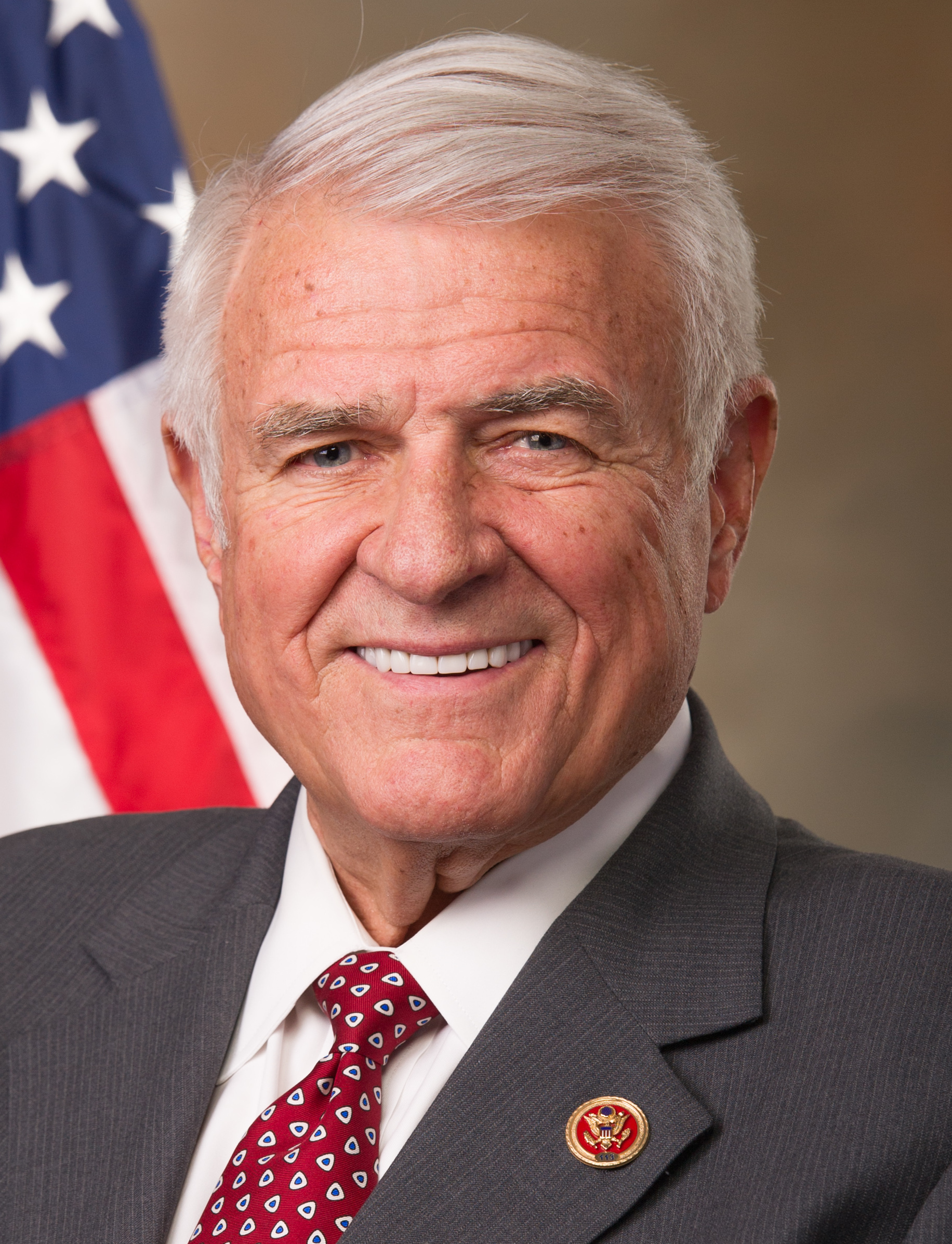

Nominee	John Carter	Mike Clark	Scott Ballard
Party	Republican	Democratic	Libertarian
Popular vote	166,060	103,852	14,676
Percentage	58.3%	36.5%	5.2%
- County results Carter: 50–60% 60–70%
U.S. Representative before election
John Carter
Republican
Elected U.S. Representative
John Carter
Republican

Incumbent Republican John Carter, who had represented the district since 2003, ran for re-election.

=== Republican primary ===
==== Candidates ====
===== Nominee =====
- John Carter, incumbent U.S. representative

===== Eliminated in primary =====
- Mike Sweeney, software company founder and president

==== Results ====
Republican primary results
Party	Candidate	Votes	%
Republican	John Carter (incumbent)	62,817	71.3
Republican	Mike Sweeney	25,306	28.7
Total votes		88,123	100.0

=== Democratic primary ===
==== Candidates ====
===== Nominee =====
- Mike Clark, technology sector employee

==== Results ====
Democratic primary results
Party	Candidate	Votes	%
Democratic	Mike Clark	28,002	100.0
Total votes		28,002	100.0

=== Libertarian primary ===
==== Candidates ====
===== Nominee =====
- Scott Ballard, nominee for this seat in 2014 and the 11th district in 2012

=== General election ===
==== Predictions ====
Source	Ranking	As of
The Cook Political Report	Safe R	November 7, 2016
Daily Kos Elections	Safe R	November 7, 2016
Rothenberg	Safe R	November 3, 2016
Sabato's Crystal Ball	Safe R	November 7, 2016
RCP	Safe R	October 31, 2016

==== Results ====
Texas's 31st congressional district, 2016
Party	Candidate	Votes	%
Republican	John Carter (incumbent)	166,060	58.3
Democratic	Mike Clark	103,852	36.5
Libertarian	Scott Ballard	14,676	5.2
Total votes		284,588	100.0
Republican hold			

== District 32 ==
2016 Texas's 32nd congressional district election
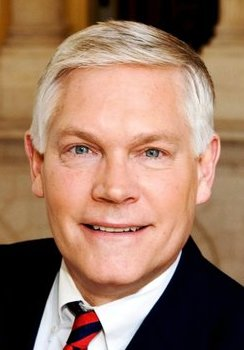

Nominee	Pete Sessions	Ed Rankin	Gary Stuard
Party	Republican	Libertarian	Green
Popular vote	162,868	43,490	22,813
Percentage	71.1%	19.0%	9.9%
- County results Sessions: 70–80%
U.S. Representative before election
Pete Sessions
Republican
Elected U.S. Representative
Pete Sessions
Republican

Incumbent Republican Pete Sessions, who had represented the district since 2003, and previously represented the 5th district from 1997 to 2003, ran for re-election against no Democratic opponent.

=== Republican primary ===
==== Candidates ====
===== Nominee =====
- Pete Sessions, incumbent U.S. representative

===== Eliminated in primary =====
- Paul Brown, Marine Corps veteran
- Russ Ramsland, co-owner of Allied Security Operations Group
- Cherie Myint Roughneen

==== Results ====
Republican primary results
Party	Candidate	Votes	%
Republican	Pete Sessions (incumbent)	49,813	61.4
Republican	Russ Ramsland	19,203	23.7
Republican	Paul Brown	9,488	11.7
Republican	Cherie Myint Roughneen	2,601	3.2
Total votes		81,105	100.0

=== Democratic primary ===
No Democrats filed to run.

=== General election ===
==== Predictions ====
Source	Ranking	As of
The Cook Political Report	Safe R	November 7, 2016
Daily Kos Elections	Safe R	November 7, 2016
Rothenberg	Safe R	November 3, 2016
Sabato's Crystal Ball	Safe R	November 7, 2016
RCP	Safe R	October 31, 2016

==== Results ====
Texas's 32nd congressional district, 2016
Party	Candidate	Votes	%
Republican	Pete Sessions (incumbent)	162,868	71.1
Libertarian	Ed Rankin	43,490	19.0
Green	Gary Stuard	22,813	9.9
Total votes		229,171	100.0
Republican hold			

== District 33 ==
2016 Texas's 33rd congressional district election
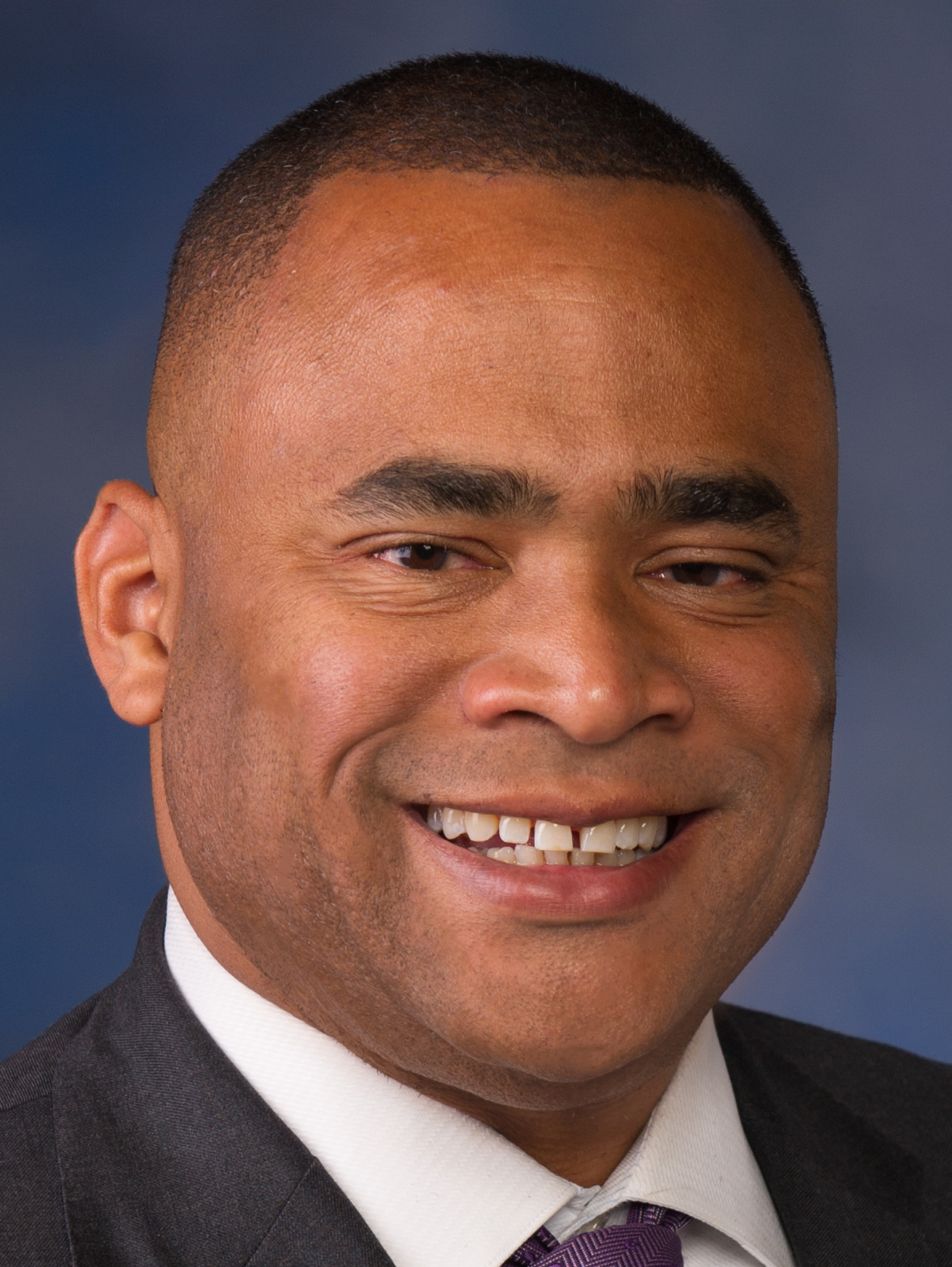

Nominee	Marc Veasey	M. Mark Mitchell
Party	Democratic	Republican
Popular vote	93,147	33,222
Percentage	73.7%	26.3%
- County results Veasey: 70–80%
U.S. Representative before election
Marc Veasey
Democratic
Elected U.S. Representative
Marc Veasey
Democratic

Incumbent Democrat Marc Veasey, who had represented the district since 2013, ran for re-election.

=== Democratic primary ===
==== Candidates ====
===== Nominee =====
- Marc Veasey, incumbent U.S. representative

===== Eliminated in primary =====
- Carlos Quintanilla, business owner, activist and candidate for this seat in 2012

==== Results ====
Democratic primary results
Party	Candidate	Votes	%
Democratic	Marc Veasey (incumbent)	20,526	63.4
Democratic	Carlos Quintanilla	11,846	36.6
Total votes		32,372	100.0

=== Republican primary ===
==== Candidates ====
===== Nominee =====
- Mark Mitchell, physician, attorney, and business owner

===== Eliminated in primary =====
- Bruce Chadwick

==== Results ====
Republican primary results
Party	Candidate	Votes	%
Republican	M. Mark Mitchell	6,411	52.4
Republican	Bruce Chadwick	5,831	47.6
Total votes		12,242	100.0

=== General election ===
==== Predictions ====
Source	Ranking	As of
The Cook Political Report	Safe D	November 7, 2016
Daily Kos Elections	Safe D	November 7, 2016
Rothenberg	Safe D	November 3, 2016
Sabato's Crystal Ball	Safe D	November 7, 2016
RCP	Safe D	October 31, 2016

==== Endorsements ====
Marc Veasey (D)

Labor unions

- AFL-CIO

==== Results ====
Texas's 33rd congressional district, 2016
Party	Candidate	Votes	%
Democratic	Marc Veasey (incumbent)	93,147	73.7
Republican	M. Mark Mitchell	33,222	26.3
Total votes		126,369	100.0
Democratic hold			

== District 34 ==
2016 Texas's 34th congressional district election
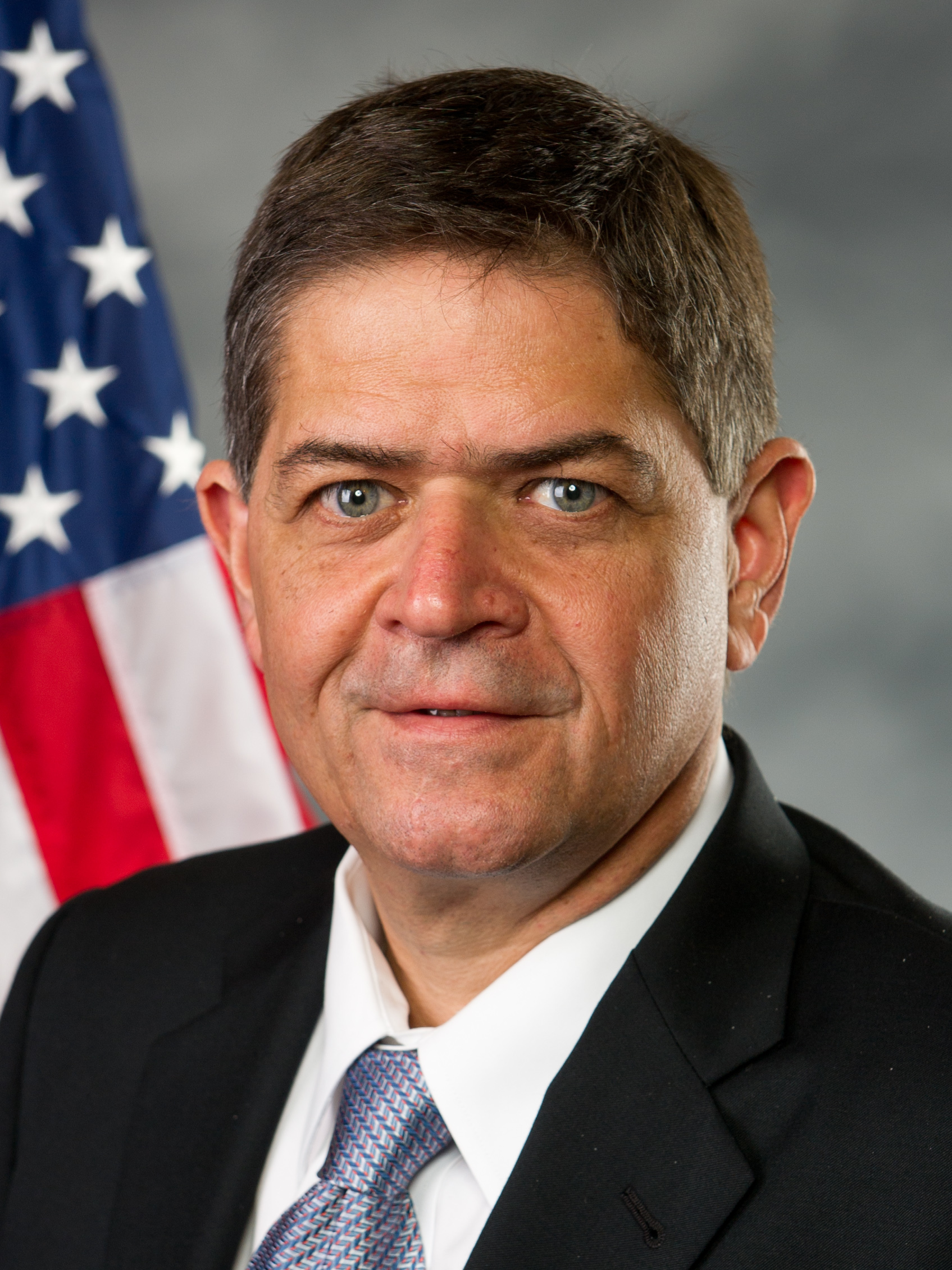

Nominee	Filemon Vela Jr.	Rey Gonzalez Jr.
Party	Democratic	Republican
Popular vote	104,638	62,323
Percentage	62.7%	37.3%
- County results Vela: 50–60% 60–70% 70–80% Gonzalez: 50–60% 60–70% 70–80% 80–90%
U.S. Representative before election
Filemon Vela Jr.
Democratic
Elected U.S. Representative
Filemon Vela Jr.
Democratic

Incumbent Democrat Filemon Vela Jr., who had represented the district since 2013, ran for re-election.

=== Democratic primary ===
==== Candidates ====
===== Nominee =====
- Filemon Vela Jr., incumbent U.S. representative

==== Results ====
Democratic primary results
Party	Candidate	Votes	%
Democratic	Filemon Vela Jr. (incumbent)	41,414	100.0
Total votes		41,414	100.0

=== Republican primary ===
==== Candidates ====
===== Nominee =====
- Rey Gonzalez Jr., attorney

===== Eliminated in primary =====
- William "Willie" Vaden

==== Results ====
Republican primary results
Party	Candidate	Votes	%
Republican	Rey Gonzalez Jr.	12,532	50.6
Republican	William "Willie" Vaden	12,253	49.4
Total votes		24,785	100.0

=== General election ===
==== Endorsements ====
Filemon Vela Jr. (D)

Labor unions

- AFL-CIO

==== Predictions ====
Source	Ranking	As of
The Cook Political Report	Safe D	November 7, 2016
Daily Kos Elections	Safe D	November 7, 2016
Rothenberg	Safe D	November 3, 2016
Sabato's Crystal Ball	Safe D	November 7, 2016
RCP	Safe D	October 31, 2016

==== Results ====
Texas's 34th congressional district, 2016
Party	Candidate	Votes	%
Democratic	Filemon Vela Jr. (incumbent)	104,638	62.7
Republican	Rey Gonzalez Jr.	62,323	37.3
Total votes		166,961	100.0
Democratic hold			

== District 35 ==
2016 Texas's 35th congressional district election
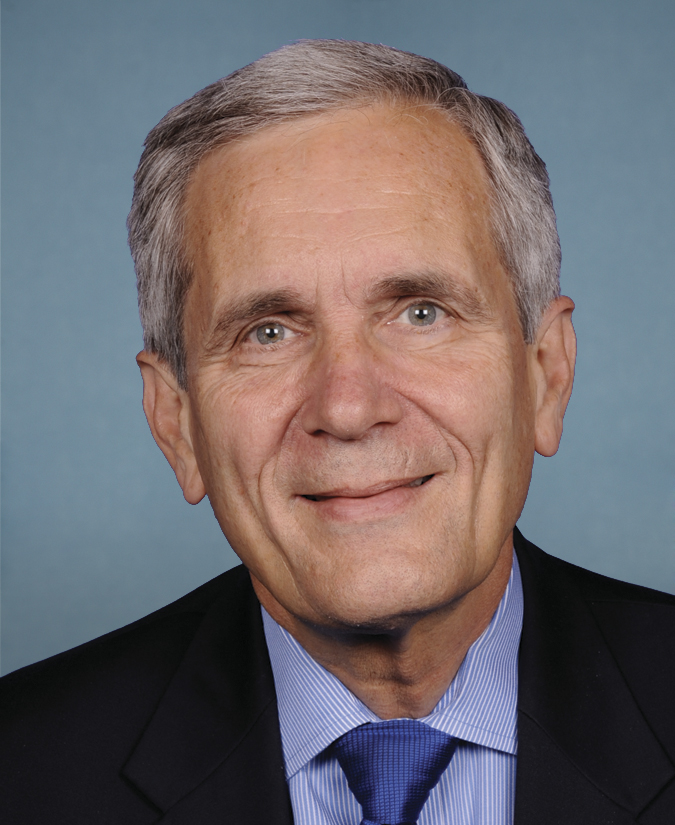

Nominee	Lloyd Doggett	Susan Narvaiz
Party	Democratic	Republican
Popular vote	124,612	62,384
Percentage	63.1%	31.6%
- County results Doggett: 50–60% 60–70% 70–80% Narvaiz: 60–70%
U.S. Representative before election
Lloyd Doggett
Democratic
Elected U.S. Representative
Lloyd Doggett
Democratic

Incumbent Democrat Lloyd Doggett, who had represented the district since 2013, having served in Congress since 1995. He was elected with 63% of the vote in 2014. The district had a PVI of D+11.

=== Democratic primary ===
==== Candidates ====
===== Nominee =====
- Lloyd Doggett, incumbent U.S. representative

==== Results ====
Democratic primary results
Party	Candidate	Votes	%
Democratic	Lloyd Doggett (incumbent)	41,189	100.0
Total votes		41,189	100.0

=== Republican primary ===
==== Candidates ====
===== Nominee =====
- Susan Narvaiz, former mayor of San Marcos and nominee for this seat in 2012 & 2014

==== Results ====
Republican primary results
Party	Candidate	Votes	%
Republican	Susan Narvaiz	22,549	100.0
Total votes		22,549	100.0

=== General election ===
==== Endorsements ====
Lloyd Doggett (D)

Labor unions

- AFL-CIO

==== Predictions ====
Source	Ranking	As of
The Cook Political Report	Safe D	November 7, 2016
Daily Kos Elections	Safe D	November 7, 2016
Rothenberg	Safe D	November 3, 2016
Sabato's Crystal Ball	Safe D	November 7, 2016
RCP	Safe D	October 31, 2016

==== Results ====
Texas's 35th congressional district, 2016
Party	Candidate	Votes	%
Democratic	Lloyd Doggett (incumbent)	124,612	63.1
Republican	Susan Narvaiz	62,384	31.6
Libertarian	Rhett Rosenquest Smith	6,504	3.2
Green	Scott Trimble	4,076	2.1
Total votes		197,576	100.0
Democratic hold			

== District 36 ==
2016 Texas's 36th congressional district election
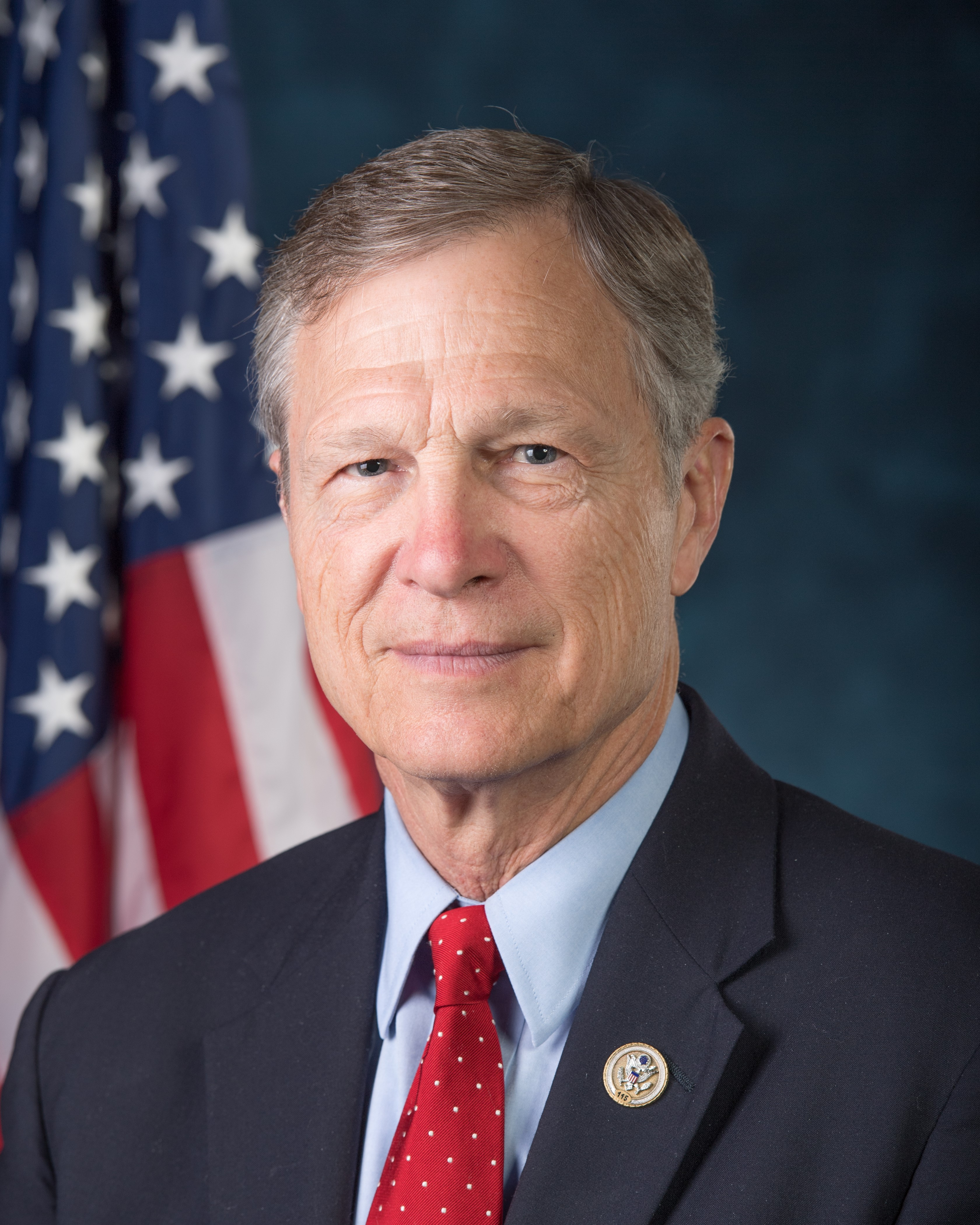

Nominee	Brian Babin	Hal J. Ridley Jr.
Party	Republican	Green
Popular vote	193,675	24,890
Percentage	88.6%	11.4%
- County results Babin: 80–90% 90–100%
U.S. Representative before election
Brian Babin
Republican
Elected U.S. Representative
Brian Babin
Republican

Incumbent Republican Brian Babin, who had represented the district since 2015, when Steve Stockman vacated the seat after a failed campaign for the United States Senate, ran for re-election. He was elected with 76 percent of the vote in 2014. The district had a PVI of R+25.

=== Republican primary ===
==== Candidates ====
===== Nominee =====
- Brian Babin, incumbent U.S. representative

===== Withdrawn =====
- Dwayne Stovall, bridge construction contractor, school board member from Cleveland, candidate for U.S. Senate in 2014 and the Texas House of Representatives in 2012 (suspended campaign in December 2015)

==== Results ====
Republican primary results
Party	Candidate	Votes	%
Republican	Brian Babin (incumbent)	80,649	100.0
Total votes		80,649	100.0

=== Democratic primary ===
No Democrats ran for the seat.

=== General election ===
==== Predictions ====
Source	Ranking	As of
The Cook Political Report	Safe R	November 7, 2016
Daily Kos Elections	Safe R	November 7, 2016
Rothenberg	Safe R	November 3, 2016
Sabato's Crystal Ball	Safe R	November 7, 2016
RCP	Safe R	October 31, 2016

==== Results ====
Texas's 36th congressional district, 2016
Party	Candidate	Votes	%
Republican	Brian Babin (incumbent)	193,675	88.6
Green	Hal J. Ridley Jr.	24,890	11.4
Total votes		218,565	100.0
Republican hold			
