= 2014 United States House of Representatives elections in Texas =

- November 4, 2014

All 36 Texas seats to the United States House of Representatives
- Turnout: 25%
	Majority party	Minority party	Third party
Party	Republican	Democratic	Libertarian
Seats before	24	12	0
Seats won	25	11	0
Seat change	▲1	▼1	Steady
Popular vote	2,684,592	1,474,016	225,178
Percentage	60.28%	33.10%	5.06%
Swing	▲2.49%	▼5.39%	▲1.84%
Republican
40–50%
50–60%
60–70%
70–80%
80–90%
>90%
Democratic
40–50%
50–60%
60–70%
70–80%
80–90%
>90%
Democratic
Hold
Republican
Hold
Gain
Republican
40–50%
50–60%
60–70%
70–80%
80–90%
>90%
Democratic
40–50%
50–60%
60–70%
70–80%
80–90%
>90%

The 2014 United States House of Representatives elections in Texas were held on Tuesday, November 4, 2014, to elect the 36 U.S. representatives from the state of Texas, one from each of the state's 36 congressional districts. The elections coincided with the elections of other federal and state offices, including a gubernatorial election and an election to the U.S. Senate.

The candidate filing deadline was December 9, 2013, the primary elections were held on March 4 and primary runoffs were on May 27.

With 25% of voting age people turning out, all seats except for that of district 23 were retained by their respective parties, with the Republican Party receiving 25 seats and the Democratic Party receiving 11 seats.

== Overview ==
Party	Votes	Percentage	Seats before	Seats after	+/–
Republican	2,684,592	60.28%	24	25	+1
Democratic	1,474,016	33.10%	12	11	-1
Libertarian	225,178	5.06%	0	0	-
Green	61,699	1.39%	0	0	-
Independent	8,014	0.18%	0	0	-
Totals	4,453,499	100.00%	36	36	0

=== By district ===
Results of the 2014 United States House of Representatives elections in Texas by district:

District	Republican		Democratic		Others		Total		Result
District	Votes	%	Votes	%	Votes	%	Votes	%	Result
District 1	115,084	77.47%	33,476	22.53%	0	0.00%	148,560	100%	Republican hold
District 2	101,936	67.95%	44,462	29.64%	3,628	2.42%	150,026	100%	Republican hold
District 3	113,404	82.01%	0	0.00%	24,876	17.99%	138,280	100%	Republican hold
District 4	115,085	100.00%	0	0.00%	0	0.00%	115,085	100%	Republican hold
District 5	88,998	85.36%	0	0.00%	15,264	14.64%	104,262	100%	Republican hold
District 6	92,334	61.15%	55,027	36.44%	3,731	2.47%	150,996	100%	Republican hold
District 7	90,606	63.26%	49,478	34.55%	3,135	2.19%	143,219	100%	Republican hold
District 8	125,066	89.32%	0	0.00%	14,947	10.68%	140,013	100%	Republican hold
District 9	0	0.0%	78,109	90.82%	7,894	9.18%	86,003	100%	Democratic hold
District 10	109,726	62.18%	60,243	34.14%	6,491	3.68%	176,460	100%	Republican hold
District 11	107,939	90.27%	0	0.00%	11,635	9.73%	119,574	100%	Republican hold
District 12	113,186	71.31%	41,757	26.31%	3,787	2.38%	158,730	100%	Republican hold
District 13	110,842	84.32%	16,822	12.80%	2,863	2.18%	131,451	100%	Republican hold
District 14	90,116	61.85%	52,545	36.06%	3,037	2.09%	145,698	100%	Republican hold
District 15	39,016	43.26%	48,708	54.01%	2,460	2.73%	90,184	100%	Democratic hold
District 16	21,324	29.17%	49,338	67.49%	2,443	3.34%	73,105	100%	Democratic hold
District 17	85,807	64.58%	43,049	32.40%	4,009	3.02%	132,865	100%	Republican hold
District 18	26,249	24.76%	76,097	71.78%	3,664	3.46%	106,010	100%	Democratic hold
District 19	90,160	77.18%	21,458	18.37%	5,200	4.45%	116,818	100%	Republican hold
District 20	0	0.0%	66,554	75.66%	21,410	24.34%	87,964	100%	Democratic hold
District 21	135,660	71.78%	0	28.22%	53,336	2.1%	188,996	100%	Republican hold
District 22	100,861	66.55%	47,844	31.57%	2,861	1.89%	151,566	100%	Republican hold
District 23	57,459	49.78%	55,037	47.68%	2,933	2.54%	115,429	100%	Republican gain
District 24	93,712	65.05%	46,548	32.31%	3,813	2.65%	144,073	100%	Republican hold
District 25	107,120	60.22%	64,463	36.24%	6,300	3.54%	177,883	100%	Republican hold
District 26	116,944	82.66%	0	0.00%	24,526	17.34%	141,470	100%	Republican hold
District 27	83,342	63.60%	44,152	33.69%	3,553	3.1%	131,047	100%	Republican hold
District 28	0	0.00%	62,508	82.10%	13,628	17.90%	76,136	100%	Democratic hold
District 29	0	0.00%	41,321	89.55%	4,822	10.45%	46,143	100%	Democratic hold
District 30	0	0.00%	93,041	87.95%	12,752	12.05%	105,793	100%	Democratic hold
District 31	91,607	64.05%	45,715	31.96%	5,706	3.99%	143,028	100%	Republican hold
District 32	96,495	61.82%	55,325	35.44%	4,276	2.74%	156,096	100%	Republican hold
District 33	0	0.00%	43,769	86.51%	6,823	13.49%	50,592	100%	Democratic hold
District 34	30,811	38.57%	47,503	59.47%	1,563	1.96%	79,877	100%	Democratic hold
District 35	32,040	33.30%	60,124	62.48%	4,061	4.22%	96,225	100%	Democratic hold
District 36	101,663	75.96%	29,543	22.07%	2,636	1.97%	133,842	100%	Republican hold
Total	2,684,592	60.28%	1,474,016	33.10%	294,891	6.62%	4,453,499	100%	

== District 1 ==
2014 Texas's 1st congressional district election
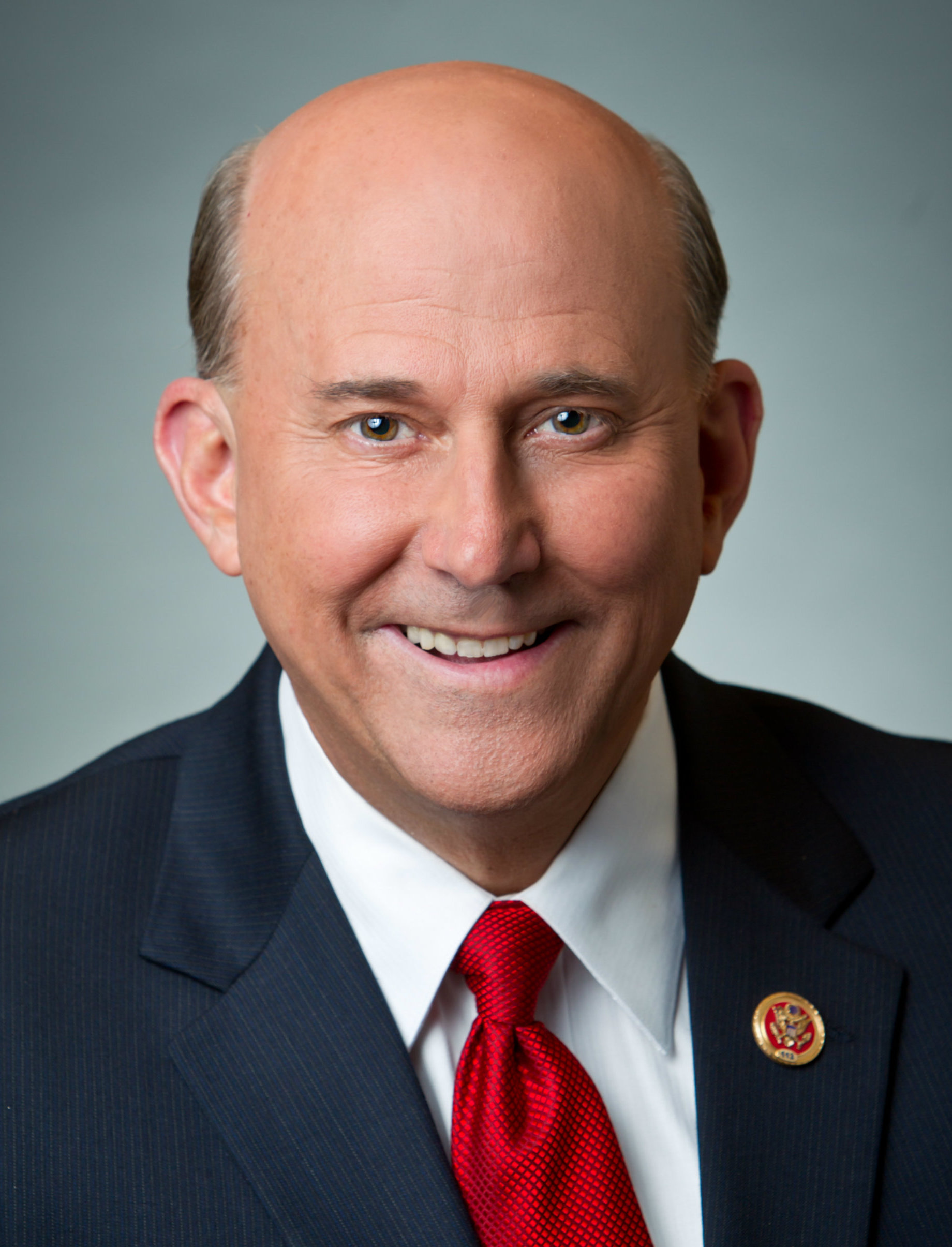

Nominee	Louie Gohmert	Shirley McKellar
Party	Republican	Democratic
Popular vote	115,084	33,476
Percentage	77.5%	22.5%
- County results Gohmert: 70–80% 80–90%
U.S. Representative before election
Louie Gohmert
Republican
Elected U.S. Representative
Louie Gohmert
Republican

Incumbent Republican Louie Gohmert, who had represented the district since 2005, ran for re-election. He was re-elected with 71% of the vote in 2012, and the district had a PVI of R+24.

=== Republican primary ===
==== Candidates ====
===== Nominee =====
- Louie Gohmert, incumbent U.S. Representative

==== Results ====
Republican primary results
Party	Candidate	Votes	%
Republican	Louie Gohmert (incumbent)	16,096	100.0

=== Democratic primary ===
==== Candidates ====
===== Nominee =====
- Shirley McKellar, Army veteran, non-profit businesswoman and nominee for this seat in 2012

==== Results ====
Democratic primary results
Party	Candidate	Votes	%
Democratic	Shirley McKellar	7,240	100.0

=== General election ===
==== Predictions ====
Source	Ranking	As of
The Cook Political Report	Safe R	November 3, 2014
Rothenberg	Safe R	October 24, 2014
Sabato's Crystal Ball	Safe R	October 30, 2014
RCP	Safe R	November 2, 2014
Daily Kos Elections	Safe R	November 4, 2014

==== Results ====
Texas's 1st congressional district, 2014
Party	Candidate	Votes	%
Republican	Louie Gohmert (incumbent)	115,084	77.5
Democratic	Shirley McKellar	33,476	22.5
Total votes		148,560	100.0
Republican hold			

== District 2 ==
2014 Texas's 2nd congressional district election
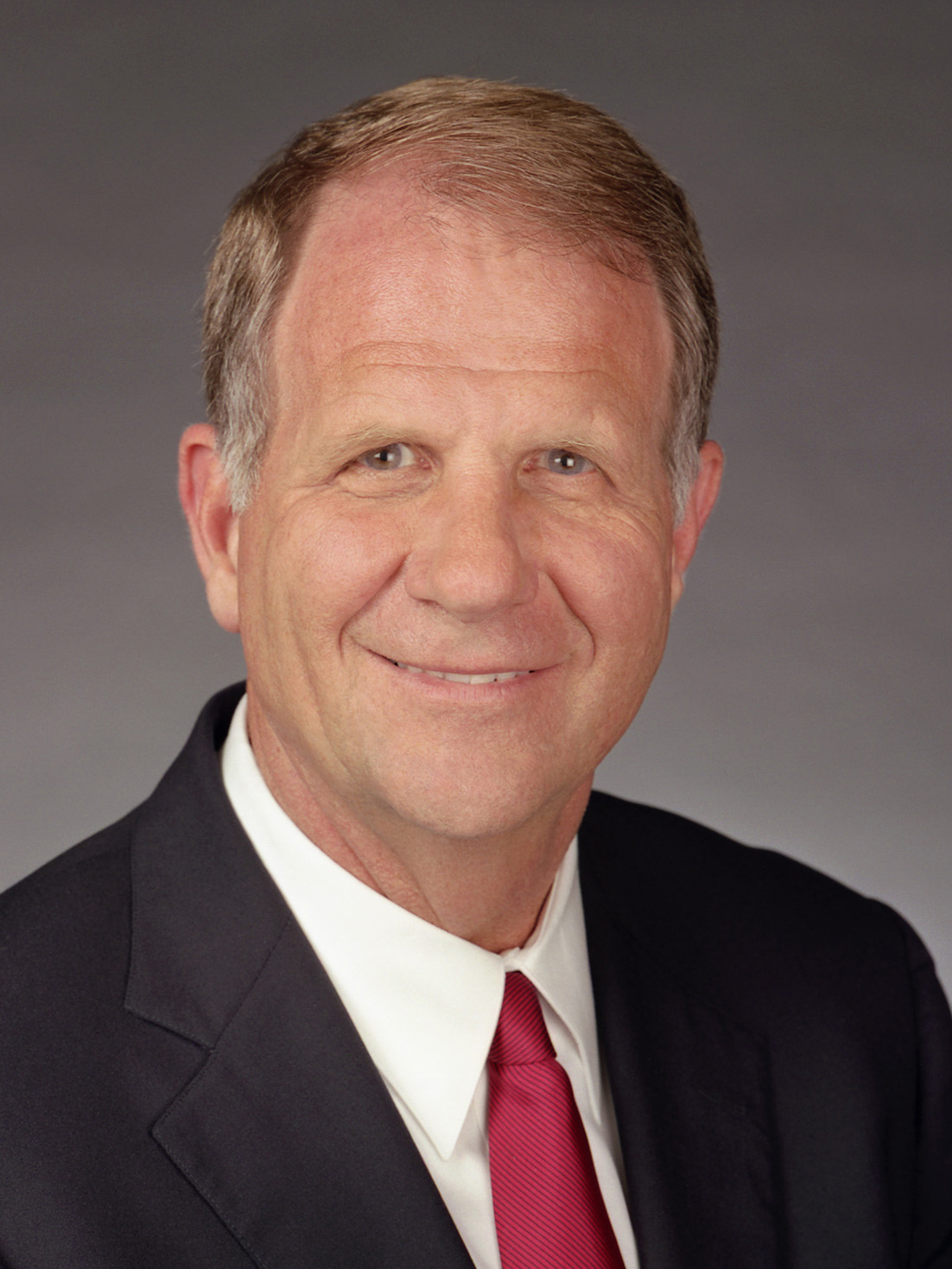

Nominee	Ted Poe	Niko Letsos
Party	Republican	Democratic
Popular vote	101,936	44,462
Percentage	68.0%	29.6%
- County results Poe: 60–70%
U.S. Representative before election
Ted Poe
Republican
Elected U.S. Representative
Ted Poe
Republican

Incumbent Republican Ted Poe, who had represented the district since 2005, ran for re-election. He was re-elected with 65% of the vote in 2012, and the district had a PVI of R+16.

=== Republican primary ===
==== Candidates ====
===== Nominee =====
- Ted Poe, incumbent U.S. Representative

==== Results ====
Republican primary results
Party	Candidate	Votes	%
Republican	Ted Poe (incumbent)	34,863	100.0

=== Democratic primary ===
==== Candidates ====
===== Nominee =====
- Niko Letsos

==== Results ====
Democratic primary results
Party	Candidate	Votes	%
Democratic	Niko Letsos	5,906	100.0

=== Libertarian primary ===
==== Candidates ====
===== Nominee =====
- James Veasaw

===== Eliminated in primary =====
- Craig Cleveland

=== General election ===
==== Predictions ====
Source	Ranking	As of
The Cook Political Report	Safe R	November 3, 2014
Rothenberg	Safe R	October 24, 2014
Sabato's Crystal Ball	Safe R	October 30, 2014
RCP	Safe R	November 2, 2014
Daily Kos Elections	Safe R	November 4, 2014

==== Results ====
Texas's 2nd congressional district, 2014
Party	Candidate	Votes	%
Republican	Ted Poe (Incumbent)	101,936	68.0
Democratic	Niko Letsos	44,462	29.6
Libertarian	James B Veasaw	2,316	1.5
Green	Mark Roberts	1,312	0.9
Total votes		150,026	100.0
Republican hold			

== District 3 ==
2014 Texas's 3rd congressional district election
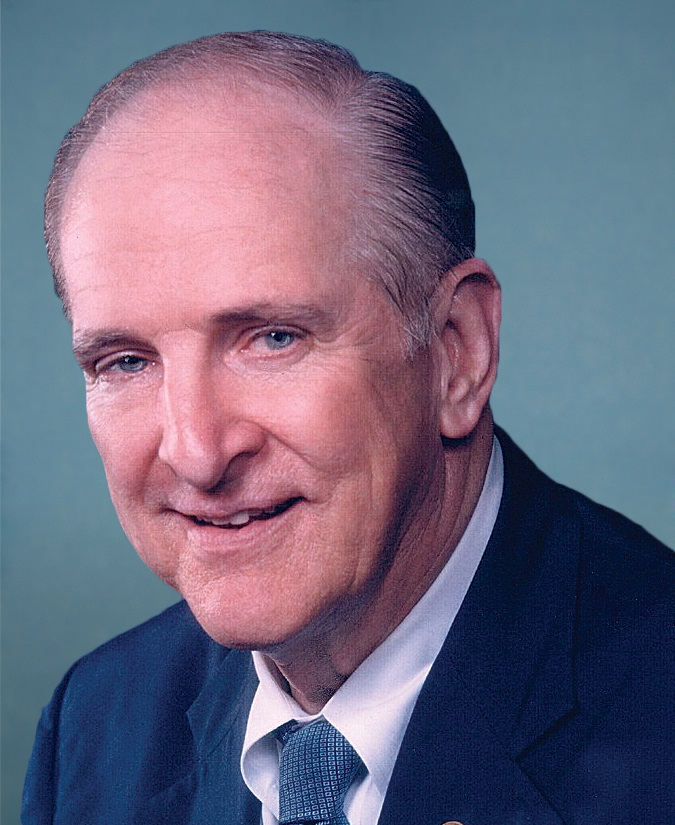

Nominee	Sam Johnson	Paul Blair
Party	Republican	Green
Popular vote	113,404	24,876
Percentage	82.0%	18.0%
- County results Johnson: 80–90%
U.S. Representative before election
Sam Johnson
Republican
Elected U.S. Representative
Sam Johnson
Republican

Incumbent Republican Sam Johnson, who had represented the district since 1991, ran for re-election. He was re-elected unopposed in 2012, and the district had a PVI of R+17.

=== Republican primary ===
==== Candidates ====
===== Nominee =====
- Sam Johnson, incumbent U.S. Representative

===== Eliminated in primary =====
- Cami Dean, businesswoman
- Josh Loveless, network engineer
- Harry Pierce, pilot and candidate for this seat in 2012

==== Results ====
Republican primary results
Party	Candidate	Votes	%
Republican	Sam Johnson (incumbent)	31,178	80.5
Republican	Harry Pierce	3,004	7.8
Republican	Cami Dean	2,435	6.3
Republican	Josh Loveless	2,086	5.4
Total votes		38,703	100.0

=== Democratic primary ===
No Democrats filed to run.

=== Libertarian primary ===
==== Candidates ====
===== Nominee =====
- Cecil Ince

=== Green primary ===
==== Candidates ====
===== Nominee =====
- Paul Blair

=== General election ===
==== Predictions ====
Source	Ranking	As of
The Cook Political Report	Safe R	November 3, 2014
Rothenberg	Safe R	October 24, 2014
Sabato's Crystal Ball	Safe R	October 30, 2014
RCP	Safe R	November 2, 2014
Daily Kos Elections	Safe R	November 4, 2014

==== Results ====
Texas's 3rd congressional district, 2014
Party	Candidate	Votes	%
Republican	Sam Johnson (incumbent)	113,404	82.0
Green	Paul Blair	24,876	18.0
Total votes		138,280	100.0
Republican hold			

== District 4 ==
2014 Texas's 4th congressional district election
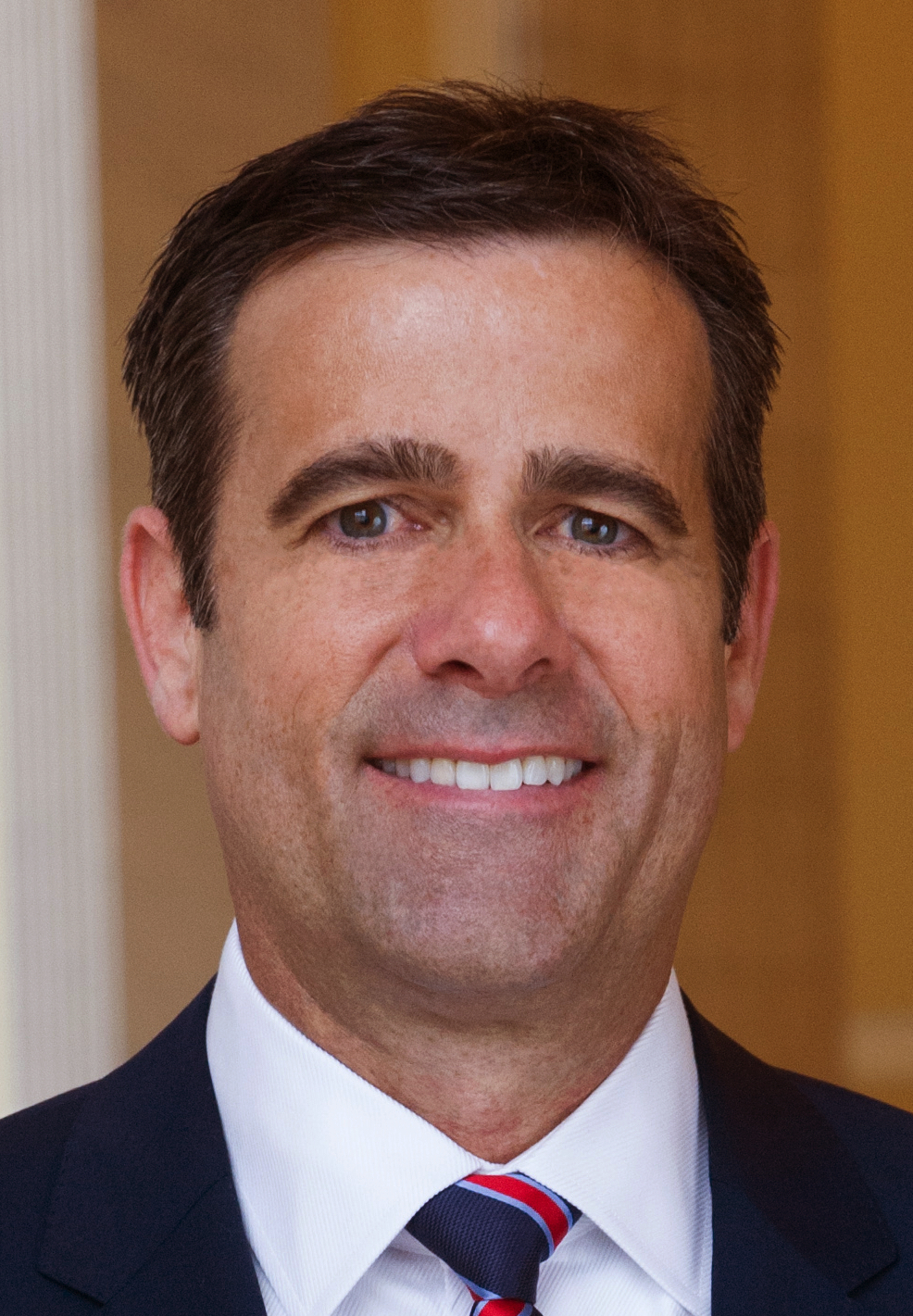

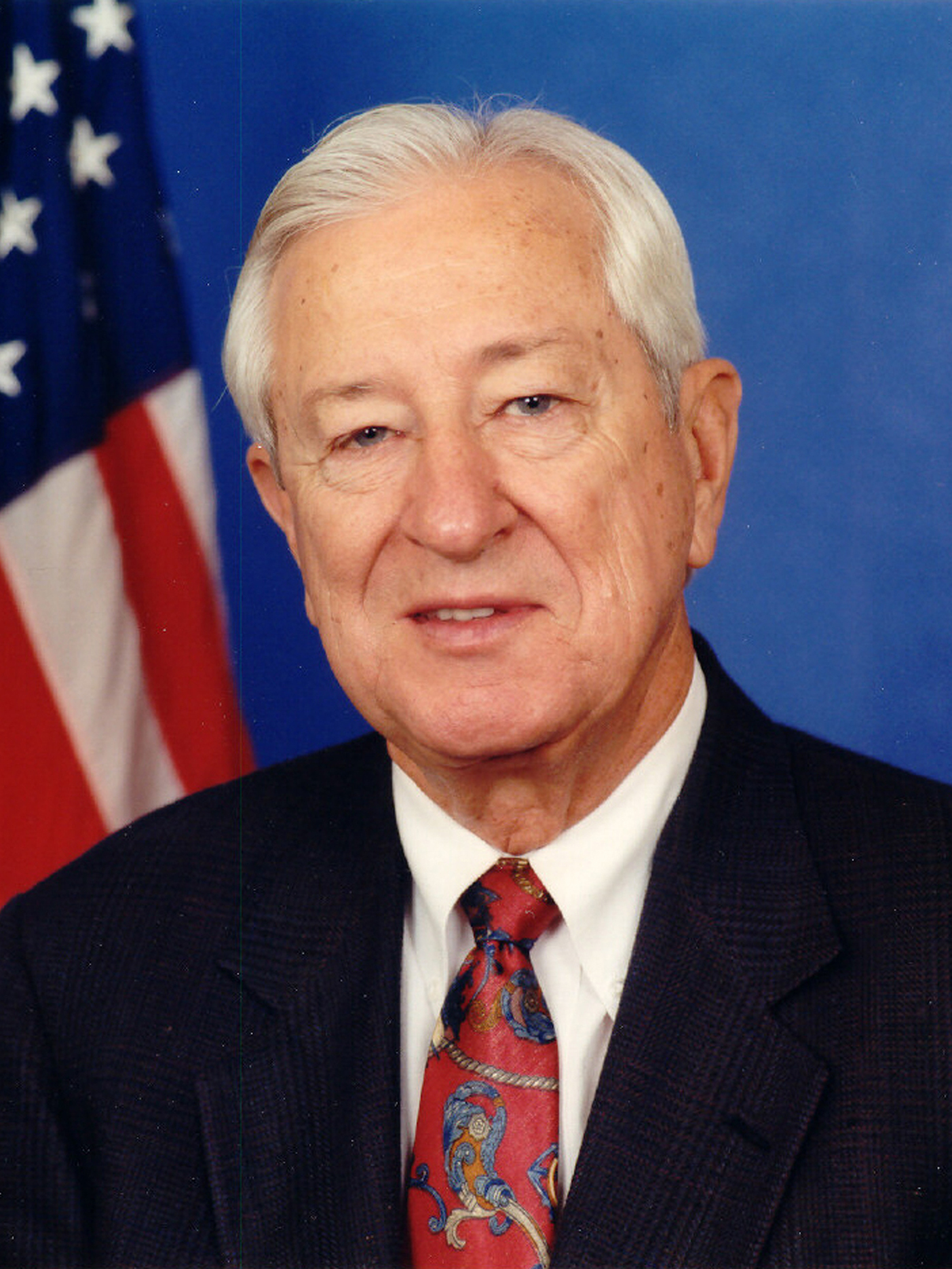
Nominee	John Ratcliffe	Ralph Hall
Party	Republican	Republican
Popular vote	22,271	19,899
Percentage	52.8%	47.2%
U.S. Representative before election
Ralph Hall
Republican
Elected U.S. Representative
John Ratcliffe
Republican

Incumbent Republican Ralph Hall, represented the district since 1981, ran for re-election. He was re-elected in 2012 with 73% of the vote, and the district had a PVI of R+25.

=== Republican primary ===
At 91 years of age, Hall was the oldest member of the US House of Representatives. He was challenged in the primary by five Republicans. Hall announced that this campaign would be the last time he runs for public office.

==== Candidates ====
===== Nominee =====
- John Ratcliffe, former United States Attorney for the Eastern District of Texas and former mayor of Heath

===== Eliminated in primary =====
- Tony Arterburn, Army veteran
- Lou Gigliotti, auto racing part company owner and candidate in 2012
- Ralph Hall, incumbent U.S. Representative
- Brent Lawson, engineering manager
- John Stacy, former city councillor of Fate City

==== Results ====
Primary results by county: Hall: 40–50%; 50–60%; Ratcliffe: 30–40%; 40–50%

Republican primary results
Party	Candidate	Votes	%
Republican	Ralph Hall (incumbent)	29,848	45.4
Republican	John Ratcliffe	18,917	28.8
Republican	Lou Gigliotti	10,601	16.1
Republican	John Stacy	2,812	4.3
Republican	Brent Lawson	2,290	3.5
Republican	Tony Arterburn	1,252	1.9
Total votes		65,720	100.0

==== Runoff ====
===== Polling =====
Poll source	Date(s) administered	Sample size	Margin of error	Ralph Hall	John Ratcliffe	Undecided
Gravis Marketing	May 12, 2014	656	± 4.0%	46%	38%	16%
Wenzel Strategies (R-Ratcliffe)	March 12–13, 2014	436	± ?	35%	47%	17%

===== Results =====
Primary results by county: Hall: 50–60%; 60–70%; Ratcliffe: 50–60%; 60–70%

Republican primary runoff results
Party	Candidate	Votes	%
Republican	John Ratcliffe	22,271	52.8
Republican	Ralph Hall (incumbent)	19,899	47.2
Total votes		42,170	100.0

Hall became the first incumbent Congressman of the 2014 cycle to be defeated in the primary, the oldest Congressman to lose a primary and the only sitting Republican U.S. Representative from Texas to unsuccessfully seek renomination to his or her seat out of 257 attempts since statehood.

=== General election ===
Ratcliffe won the election uncontested.

==== Predictions ====
Source	Ranking	As of
The Cook Political Report	Safe R	November 3, 2014
Rothenberg	Safe R	October 24, 2014
Sabato's Crystal Ball	Safe R	October 30, 2014
RCP	Safe R	November 2, 2014
Daily Kos Elections	Safe R	November 4, 2014

==== Results ====
Texas's 4th congressional district, 2014
Party	Candidate	Votes	%
Republican	John Ratcliffe	115,085	100.0
Total votes		115,085	100.0
Republican hold			

== District 5 ==
2014 Texas's 5th congressional district election
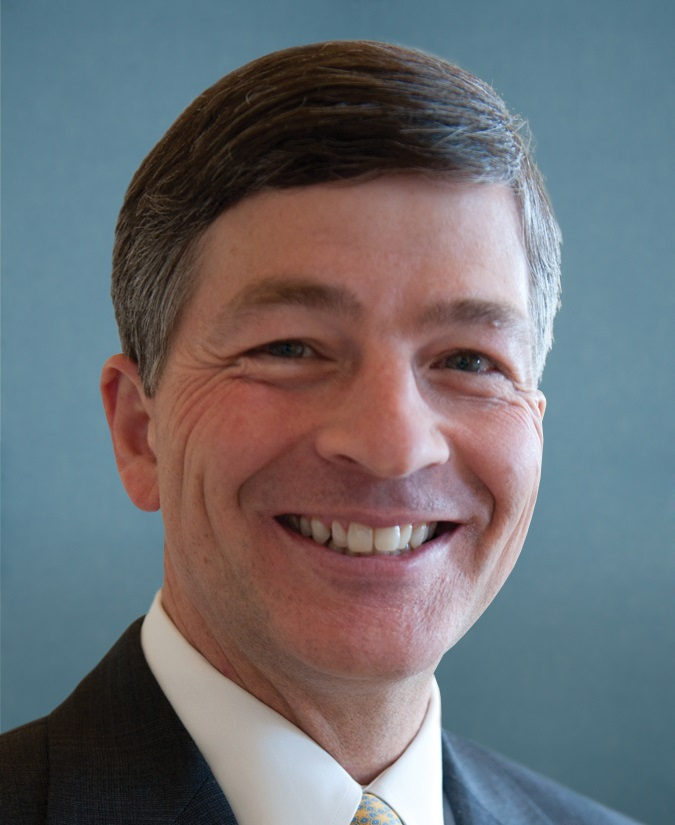

Nominee	Jeb Hensarling	Ken Ashby
Party	Republican	Libertarian
Popular vote	88,998	15,264
Percentage	85.4%	14.6%
- County results Hensarling: 60–70% 70–80%
U.S. Representative before election
Jeb Hensarling
Republican
Elected U.S. Representative
Jeb Hensarling
Republican

Incumbent Republican Jeb Hensarling, who had represented the district since 2003, ran for re-election. He was re-elected in 2012 with 64% of the vote, and the district had a PVI of R+17.

=== Republican primary ===
==== Candidates ====
===== Nominee =====
- Jeb Hensarling, incumbent U.S. Representative

==== Results ====
Republican primary results
Party	Candidate	Votes	%
Republican	Jeb Hensarling (incumbent)	41,634	100.0

=== Democratic primary ===
No Democrats filed to run.

=== Libertarian primary ===
==== Candidates ====
===== Nominee =====
- Ken Ashby

=== General election ===
==== Predictions ====
Source	Ranking	As of
The Cook Political Report	Safe R	November 3, 2014
Rothenberg	Safe R	October 24, 2014
Sabato's Crystal Ball	Safe R	October 30, 2014
RCP	Safe R	November 2, 2014
Daily Kos Elections	Safe R	November 4, 2014

==== Results ====
Texas's 5th congressional district, 2014
Party	Candidate	Votes	%
Republican	Jeb Hensarling (incumbent)	88,998	85.4
Libertarian	Ken Ashby	15,264	14.6
Total votes		104,262	100.0
Republican hold			

== District 6 ==
2014 Texas's 6th congressional district election
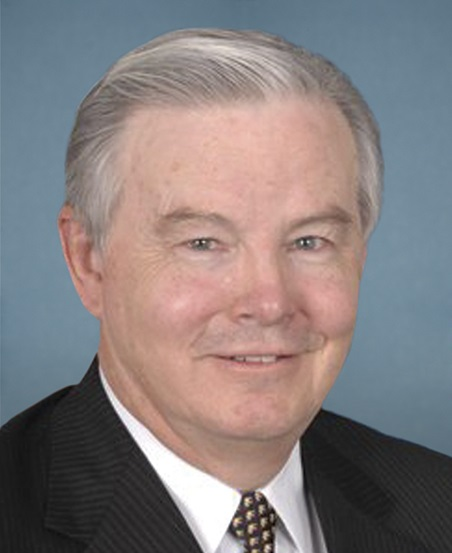

Nominee	Joe Barton	David Cozad
Party	Republican	Democratic
Popular vote	92,334	55,027
Percentage	61.2%	36.4%
- County results Barton: 50–60% 70–80%
U.S. Representative before election
Joe Barton
Republican
Elected U.S. Representative
Joe Barton
Republican

Incumbent Republican Joe Barton, who had represented the district since 1985, ran for re-election. He was re-elected in 2012 with 58% of the vote, and the district had a PVI of R+11.

=== Republican primary ===
==== Candidates ====
===== Nominee =====
- Joe Barton, incumbent U.S. Representative

===== Eliminated in primary =====
- Frank Kuchar

==== Results ====
Republican primary results
Party	Candidate	Votes	%
Republican	Joe Barton (incumbent)	32,618	72.7
Republican	Frank Kuchar	12,272	27.3
Total votes		44,890	100.0

=== Democratic primary ===
==== Candidates ====
===== Nominee =====
- David Edwin Cozad

==== Results ====
Democratic primary results
Party	Candidate	Votes	%
Democratic	David Edwin Cozad	11,727	100.0

=== Libertarian primary ===
==== Candidates ====
===== Nominee =====
- Hugh Chauvin

=== General election ===
==== Endorsements ====
David Cozad (D)

Labor unions

- AFL-CIO

==== Predictions ====
Source	Ranking	As of
The Cook Political Report	Safe R	November 3, 2014
Rothenberg	Safe R	October 24, 2014
Sabato's Crystal Ball	Safe R	October 30, 2014
RCP	Safe R	November 2, 2014
Daily Kos Elections	Safe R	November 4, 2014

==== Results ====
Texas's 6th congressional district, 2014
Party	Candidate	Votes	%
Republican	Joe Barton (incumbent)	92,334	61.2
Democratic	David Cozad	55,027	36.4
Libertarian	Hugh Chauvin	3,635	2.4
Total votes		150,996	100.0
Republican hold			

== District 7 ==
2014 Texas's 7th congressional district election
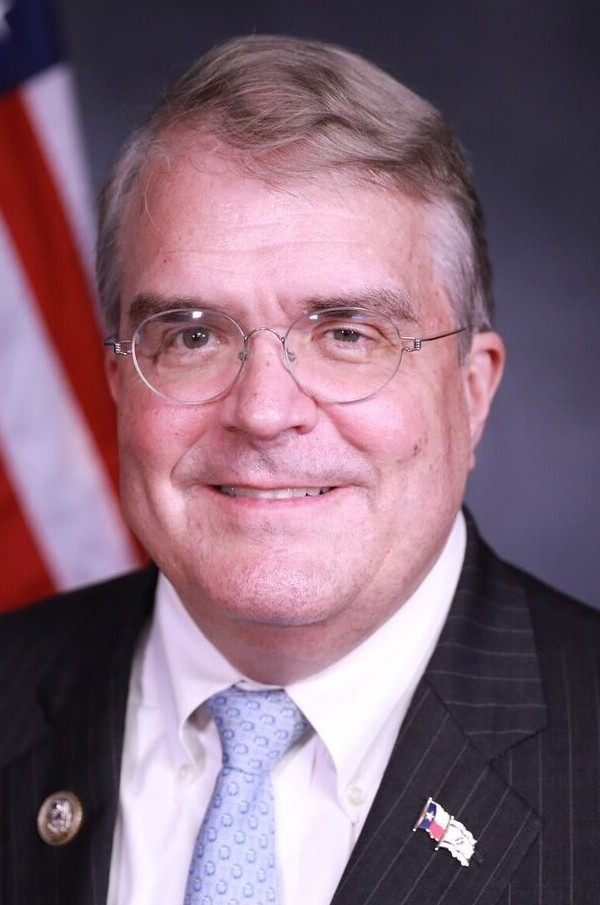

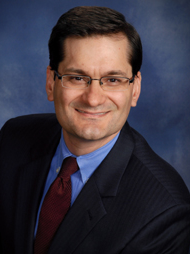
Nominee	John Culberson	James Cargas
Party	Republican	Democratic
Popular vote	90,606	49,478
Percentage	63.3%	34.5%
- County results Culberson: 60–70%
U.S. Representative before election
John Culberson
Republican
Elected U.S. Representative
John Culberson
Republican

Incumbent Republican John Culberson, who had represented the district since 2001, ran for re-election. He was re-elected in 2012 with 61% of the vote, and the district had a PVI of R+13.

=== Republican primary ===
==== Candidates ====
===== Nominee =====
- John Culberson, incumbent U.S. Representative

==== Results ====
Republican primary results
Party	Candidate	Votes	%
Republican	John Culberson (incumbent)	31,065	100.0

=== Democratic primary ===
==== Candidates ====
===== Nominee =====
- James Cargas, energy attorney and nominee for this seat in 2012

===== Eliminated in primary =====
- Lissa Squires, activist

==== Results ====
Democratic primary results
Party	Candidate	Votes	%
Democratic	James Cargas	4,098	62.2
Democratic	Lissa Squiers	2,491	37.8
Total votes		6,589	100.0

=== Libertarian primary ===
==== Candidates ====
===== Nominee =====
- Gerald Fowler

=== General election ===
==== Endorsements ====
James Cargas (D)

Labor unions

- AFL-CIO

==== Predictions ====
Source	Ranking	As of
The Cook Political Report	Safe R	November 3, 2014
Rothenberg	Safe R	October 24, 2014
Sabato's Crystal Ball	Safe R	October 30, 2014
RCP	Safe R	November 2, 2014
Daily Kos Elections	Safe R	November 4, 2014

==== Results ====
Texas's 7th congressional district, 2014
Party	Candidate	Votes	%
Republican	John Culberson (incumbent)	90,606	63.3
Democratic	James Cargas	49,478	34.5
Libertarian	Grant Fowler	3,135	2.2
Total votes		143,219	100.0
Republican hold			

== District 8 ==
2014 Texas's 8th congressional district election
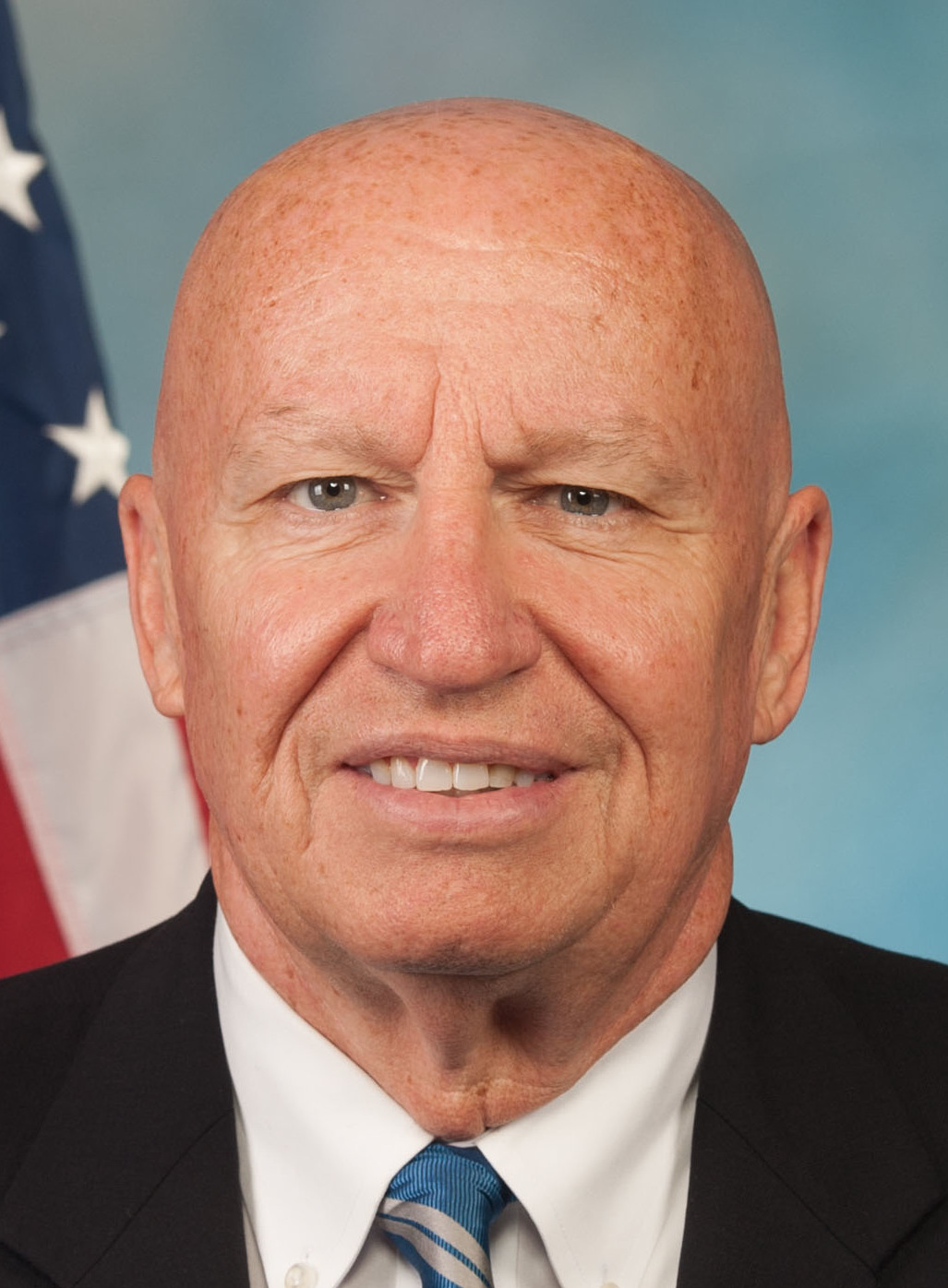

Nominee	Kevin Brady	Ken Petty
Party	Republican	Libertarian
Popular vote	125,066	14,947
Percentage	89.3%	10.7%
- County results Brady: 80–90% 90–100%
U.S. Representative before election
Kevin Brady
Republican
Elected U.S. Representative
Kevin Brady
Republican

Incumbent Republican Kevin Brady, who had represented the district since 1997, ran for re-election. He was re-elected in 2012 with 77% of the vote, and the district had a PVI of R+29.

=== Republican primary ===
==== Candidates ====
===== Nominee =====
- Kevin Brady, incumbent U.S. Representative

===== Eliminated in primary =====
- Craig McMichael, network engineer and Marine Corps veteran

==== Results ====
Republican primary results
Party	Candidate	Votes	%
Republican	Kevin Brady (incumbent)	42,368	68.3
Republican	Craig McMichael	19,687	31.7
Total votes		62,055	100.0

=== Democratic primary ===
No Democrats filed to run.

=== Libertarian primary ===
Libertarian Russ Jones and Ken Petty ran in a petition primary, which Petty won.

==== Candidates ====
===== Nominee =====
- Ken Petty

===== Eliminated in primary =====
- Russ Jones

=== General election ===
==== Predictions ====
Source	Ranking	As of
The Cook Political Report	Safe R	November 3, 2014
Rothenberg	Safe R	October 24, 2014
Sabato's Crystal Ball	Safe R	October 30, 2014
RCP	Safe R	November 2, 2014
Daily Kos Elections	Safe R	November 4, 2014

==== Results ====
Texas's 8th congressional district, 2014
Party	Candidate	Votes	%
Republican	Kevin Brady (incumbent)	125,066	89.3
Libertarian	Ken Petty	14,947	10.7
Total votes		140,013	100.0
Republican hold			

== District 9 ==
2014 Texas's 9th congressional district election
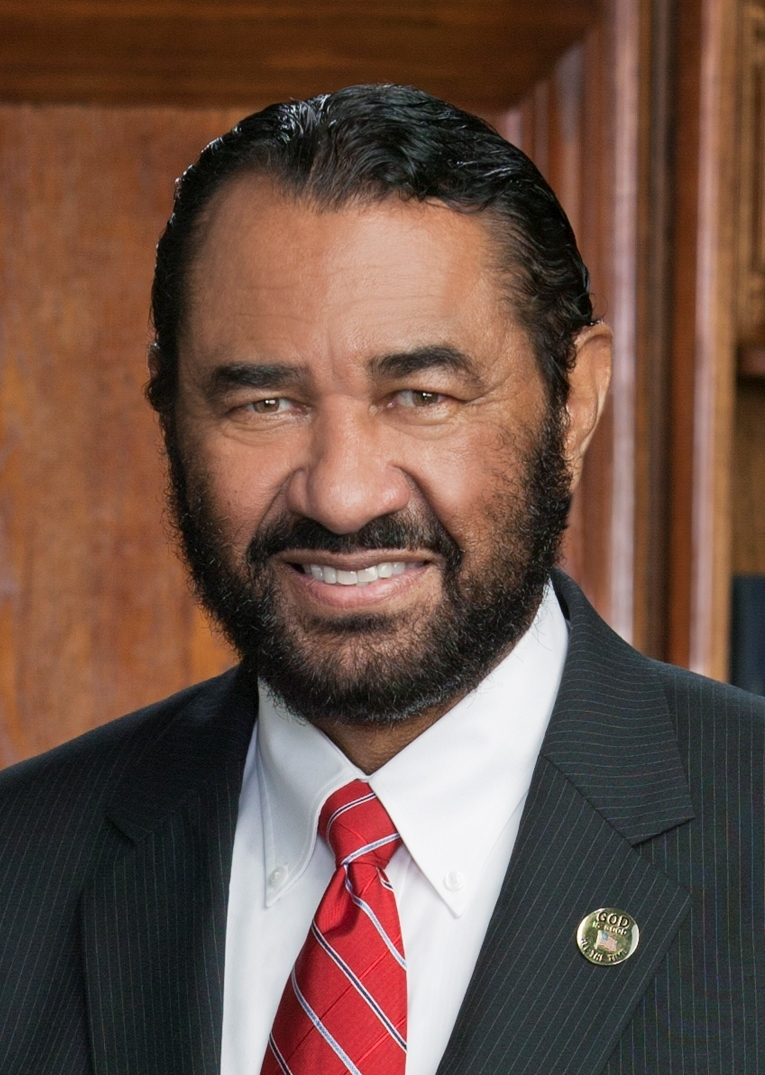

Nominee	Al Green	Johnny Johnson
Party	Democratic	Libertarian
Popular vote	78,109	7,894
Percentage	90.8%	9.2%
- County results Green: 90–100%
U.S. Representative before election
Al Green
Democratic
Elected U.S. Representative
Al Green
Democratic

Incumbent Democrat Al Green, who had represented the district since 2005, ran for re-election. He was re-elected in 2012 with 78% of the vote, and the district had a PVI of D+25.

=== Democratic primary ===
==== Candidates ====
===== Nominee =====
- Al Green, incumbent U.S. Representative

==== Results ====
Democratic primary results
Party	Candidate	Votes	%
Democratic	Al Green (incumbent)	13,442	100.0

=== Republican primary ===
No Republicans filed to run.

=== Libertarian primary ===
==== Candidates ====
===== Nominee =====
- Johnny Johnson

=== Green primary ===
==== Candidates ====
===== Withdrawn =====
- George Reiter

=== General election ===
==== Endorsements ====
Al Green (D)

Labor unions

- AFL-CIO

==== Predictions ====
Source	Ranking	As of
The Cook Political Report	Safe D	November 3, 2014
Rothenberg	Safe D	October 24, 2014
Sabato's Crystal Ball	Safe D	October 30, 2014
RCP	Safe D	November 2, 2014
Daily Kos Elections	Safe D	November 4, 2014

==== Results ====
Texas's 9th congressional district, 2014
Party	Candidate	Votes	%
Democratic	Al Green (incumbent)	78,109	90.8
Libertarian	Johnny Johnson	7,894	9.2
Total votes		86,003	100.0
Democratic hold			

== District 10 ==
2014 Texas's 10th congressional district election
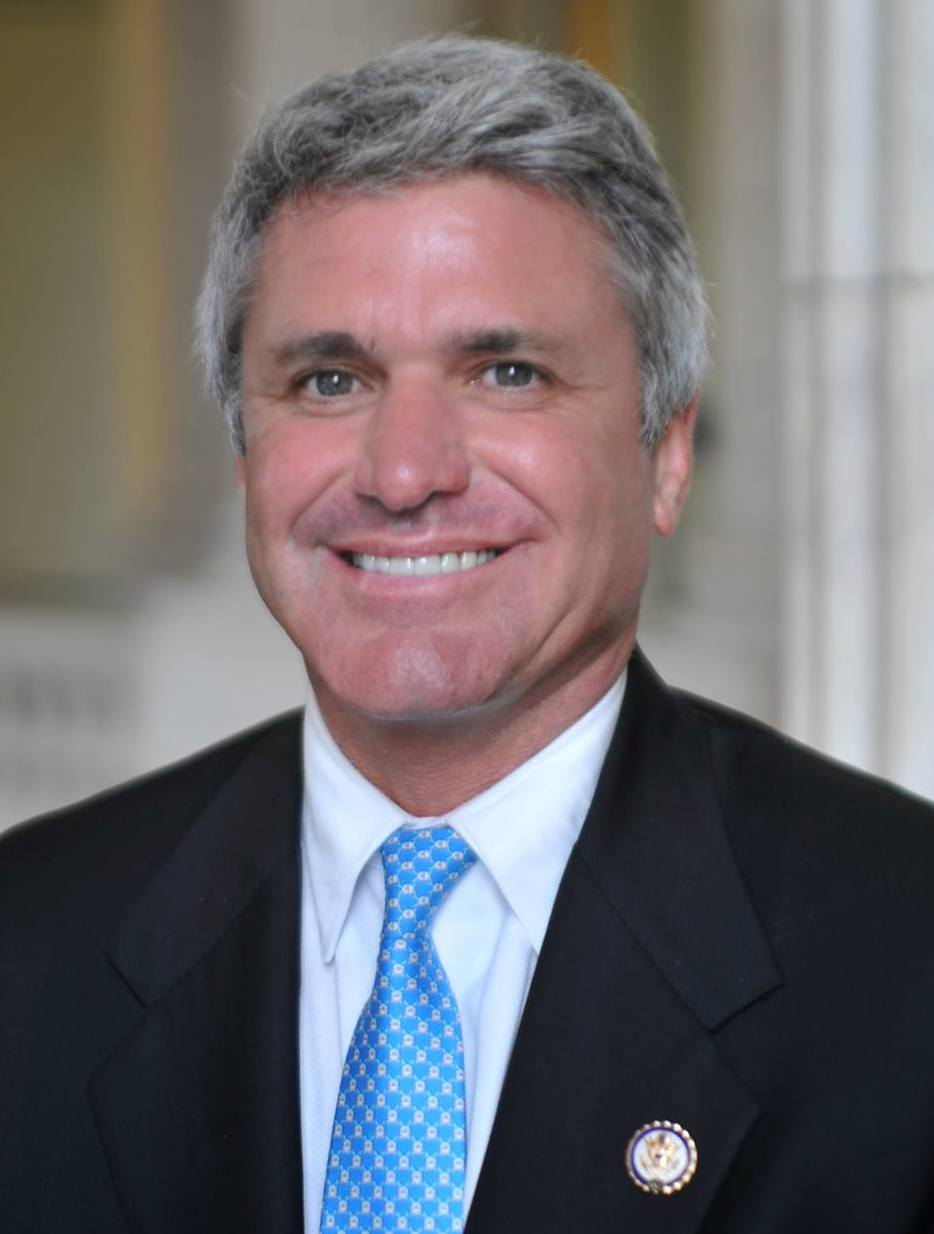

Nominee	Michael McCaul	Tawana Walter-Cadien
Party	Republican	Democratic
Popular vote	109,726	60,243
Percentage	62.2%	34.1%
- County results Mccaul: 50–60% 70–80% 80–90% Walter-Cadien: 50–60%
U.S. Representative before election
Michael McCaul
Republican
Elected U.S. Representative
Michael McCaul
Republican

Incumbent Republican Michael McCaul, who had represented the district since 2005, ran for re-election. He was re-elected in 2012 with 61% of the vote, and the district had a PVI of R+29.

=== Republican primary ===
==== Results ====
Republican primary results
Party	Candidate	Votes	%
Republican	Michael McCaul (incumbent)	38,406	100.0

=== Democratic primary ===
==== Candidates ====
===== Nominee =====
- Tawana Walter-Cadien, consultant, registered nurse, MMA surgery supervisor, quality assurance director and nominee for this seat in 2012

==== Results ====
Democratic primary results
Party	Candidate	Votes	%
Democratic	Tawana Walter-Cadien	13,915	100.0

=== Libertarian primary ===
==== Candidates ====
===== Nominee =====
- Bill Kelsey

=== General election ===
==== Predictions ====
Source	Ranking	As of
The Cook Political Report	Safe R	November 3, 2014
Rothenberg	Safe R	October 24, 2014
Sabato's Crystal Ball	Safe R	October 30, 2014
RCP	Safe R	November 2, 2014
Daily Kos Elections	Safe R	November 4, 2014

==== Results ====
Texas's 10th congressional district, 2014
Party	Candidate	Votes	%
Republican	Michael McCaul (incumbent)	109,726	62.2
Democratic	Tawana Walter-Cadien	60,243	34.1
Libertarian	Bill Kelsey	6,491	3.7
Total votes		176,460	100.0
Republican hold			

== District 11 ==
2014 Texas's 11th congressional district election
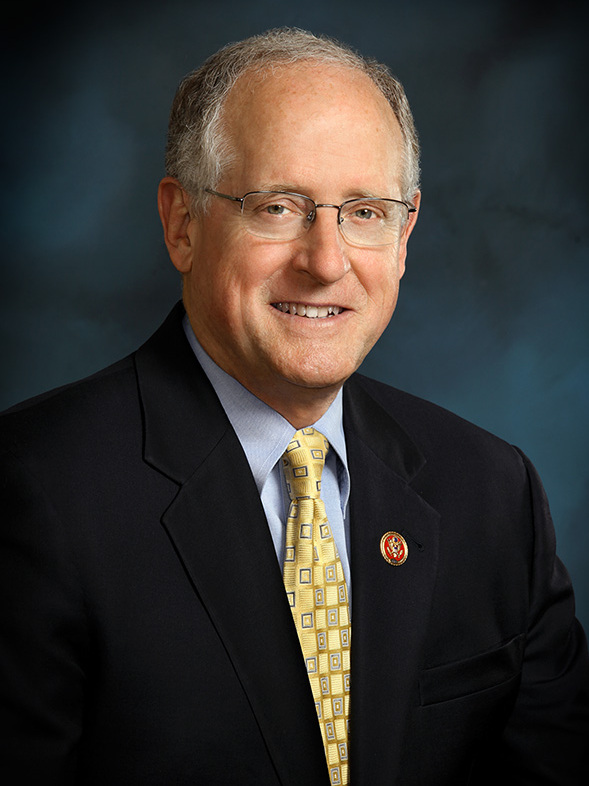

Nominee	Mike Conaway	Ryan T. Lange
Party	Republican	Libertarian
Popular vote	107,939	11,635
Percentage	90.3%	9.7%
- County results Conaway: 80–90% 90–100%
U.S. Representative before election
Mike Conaway
Republican
Elected U.S. Representative
Mike Conaway
Republican

Incumbent Republican Mike Conaway, who had represented the district since 2005, ran for re-election. He was re-elected in 2012 with 79% of the vote, and the district had a PVI of R+31.

=== Republican primary ===
==== Candidates ====
===== Nominee =====
- Mike Conaway, incumbent U.S. Representative

===== Eliminated in primary =====
- Wade Brown

==== Results ====
Republican primary results
Party	Candidate	Votes	%
Republican	Mike Conaway (incumbent)	53,272	73.7
Republican	Wade Brown	19,010	26.3
Total votes		72,282	100.0

=== Democratic primary ===
No Democrats filed to run.

=== Libertarian primary ===
==== Candidates ====
===== Nominee =====
- Ryan T. Lange

=== General election ===
==== Predictions ====
Source	Ranking	As of
The Cook Political Report	Safe R	November 3, 2014
Rothenberg	Safe R	October 24, 2014
Sabato's Crystal Ball	Safe R	October 30, 2014
RCP	Safe R	November 2, 2014
Daily Kos Elections	Safe R	November 4, 2014

==== Results ====
Texas's 11th congressional district, 2014
Party	Candidate	Votes	%
Republican	Mike Conaway (incumbent)	107,939	90.3
Libertarian	Ryan T. Lange	11,635	9.7
Total votes		119,574	100.0
Republican hold			

== District 12 ==
2014 Texas's 12th congressional district election
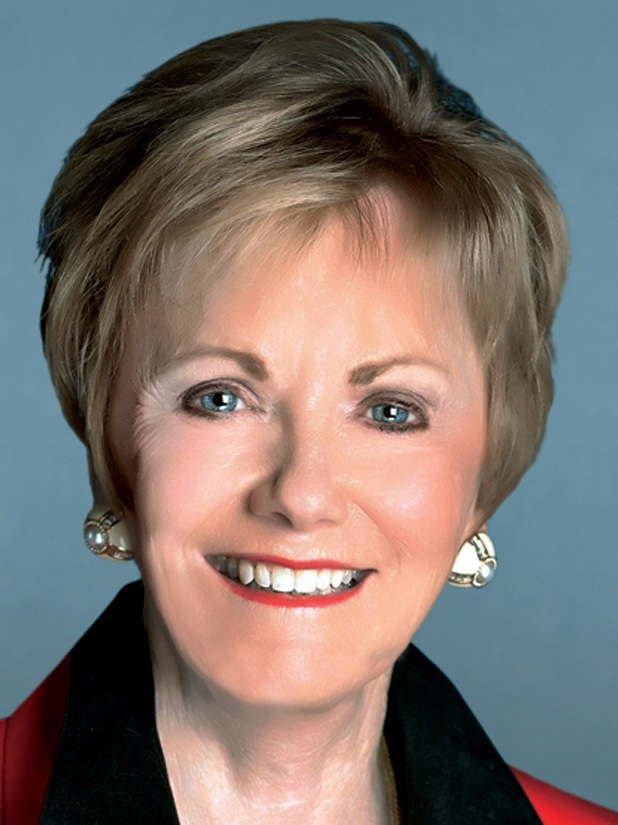

Nominee	Kay Granger	Mark Greene
Party	Republican	Democratic
Popular vote	113,186	41,757
Percentage	71.3%	26.3%
- County results Granger: 60–70% 70–80%
U.S. Representative before election
Kay Granger
Republican
Elected U.S. Representative
Kay Granger
Republican

Incumbent Republican Kay Granger, who had represented the district since 1997, ran for re-election. She was re-elected in 2012 with 71% of the vote, and the district had a PVI of R+19.

=== Republican primary ===
==== Candidates ====
===== Nominee =====
- Kay Granger, incumbent U.S. Representative

==== Results ====
Republican primary results
Party	Candidate	Votes	%
Republican	Kay Granger (incumbent)	39,907	100.0

=== Democratic primary ===
==== Candidates ====
===== Nominee =====
- Mark Greene, U.S. Army veteran, journalist and nominee for this seat in 2000

==== Results ====
Democratic primary results
Party	Candidate	Votes	%
Democratic	Mark Greene	9,700	100.0

=== Libertarian primary ===
==== Candidates ====
===== Nominee =====
- Ed Colliver

=== General election ===
==== Endorsements ====
Mark Greene (D)

Labor unions

- AFL-CIO

==== Predictions ====
Source	Ranking	As of
The Cook Political Report	Safe R	November 3, 2014
Rothenberg	Safe R	October 24, 2014
Sabato's Crystal Ball	Safe R	October 30, 2014
RCP	Safe R	November 2, 2014
Daily Kos Elections	Safe R	November 4, 2014

==== Results ====
Texas's 12th congressional district, 2014
Party	Candidate	Votes	%
Republican	Kay Granger (incumbent)	113,186	71.3
Democratic	Mark Greene	41,757	26.3
Libertarian	Ed Colliver	3,787	2.4
Total votes		158,730	100.0
Republican hold			

== District 13 ==
2014 Texas's 13th congressional district election
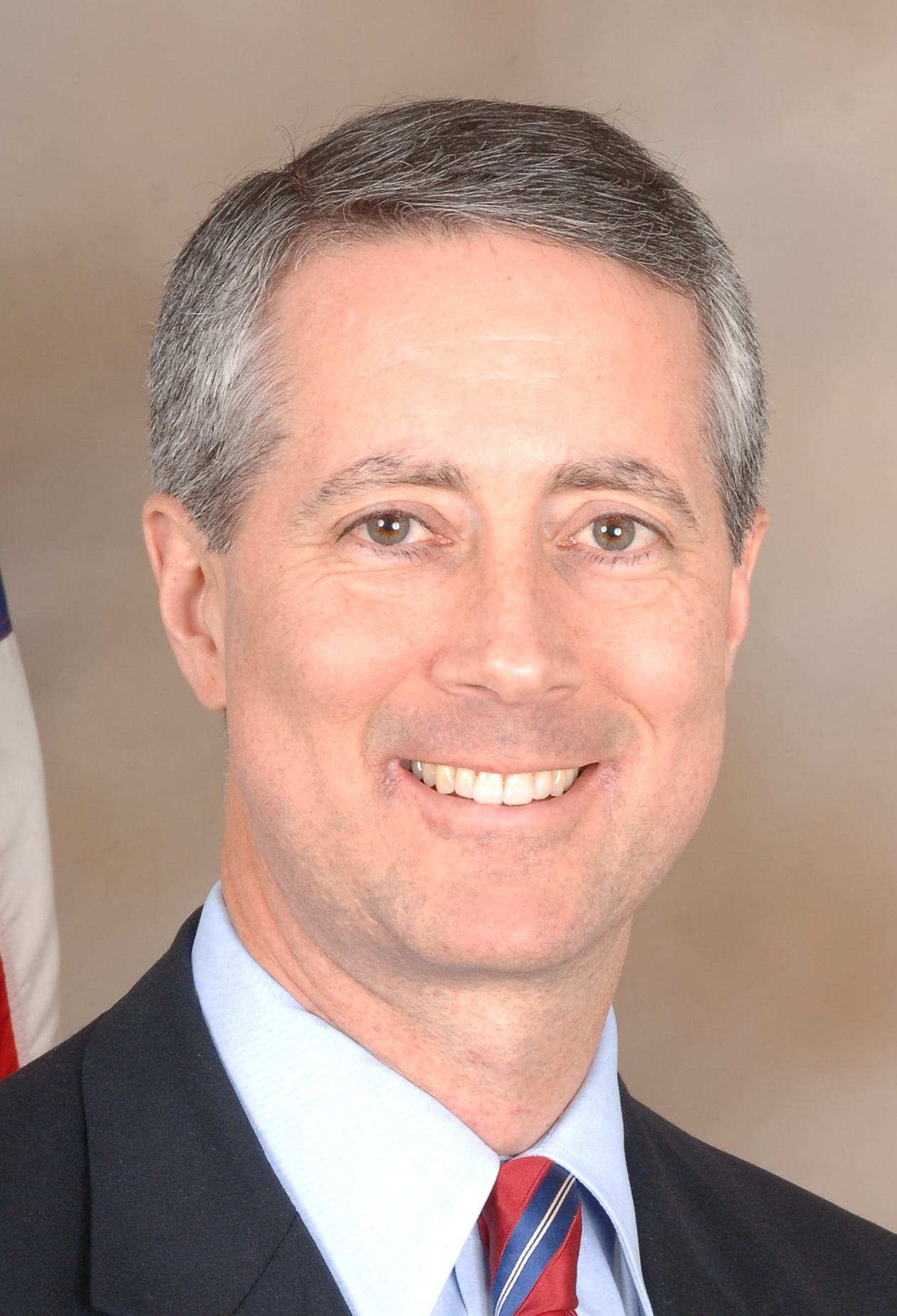

Nominee	Mac Thornberry	Mike Minter
Party	Republican	Democratic
Popular vote	110,842	16,822
Percentage	84.3%	12.8%
- County results Thornberry: 60–70% 70–80% 80–90% 90–100%
U.S. Representative before election
Mac Thornberry
Republican
Elected U.S. Representative
Mac Thornberry
Republican

Incumbent Republican Mac Thornberry, who had represented the district since 1995, ran for re-election. He was re-elected in 2012 with 91% of the vote. The district has a PVI of R+32, making it the most Republican district in the entire country.

=== Republican primary ===
==== Candidates ====
===== Nominee =====
- Mac Thornberry, incumbent U.S. Representative

===== Eliminated in primary =====
- Pam Barlow, veterinarian
- Elaine Hays, businesswoman

==== Results ====
Republican primary results
Party	Candidate	Votes	%
Republican	Mac Thornberry (incumbent)	45,168	68.2
Republican	Elaine Hays	12,330	18.6
Republican	Pam Barlow	8,723	13.2
Total votes		66,221	100.0

=== Democratic primary ===
==== Candidates ====
===== Nominee =====
- Mike Minter

==== Results ====
Democratic primary results
Party	Candidate	Votes	%
Democratic	Mike Minter	4,842	100.0

=== Libertarian primary ===
==== Candidates ====
===== Nominee =====
- Emily Pivoda

=== Green primary ===
==== Candidates ====
===== Nominee =====
- Don Cook

=== General election ===
==== Predictions ====
Source	Ranking	As of
The Cook Political Report	Safe R	November 3, 2014
Rothenberg	Safe R	October 24, 2014
Sabato's Crystal Ball	Safe R	October 30, 2014
RCP	Safe R	November 2, 2014
Daily Kos Elections	Safe R	November 4, 2014

==== Results ====
Texas's 13th congressional district, 2014
Party	Candidate	Votes	%
Republican	Mac Thornberry (incumbent)	110,842	84.3
Democratic	Mike Minter	16,822	12.8
Libertarian	Emily Pivoda	2,863	2.2
Green	Don Cook	924	0.7
Total votes		131,451	100.0
Republican hold			

== District 14 ==
2014 Texas's 14th congressional district election
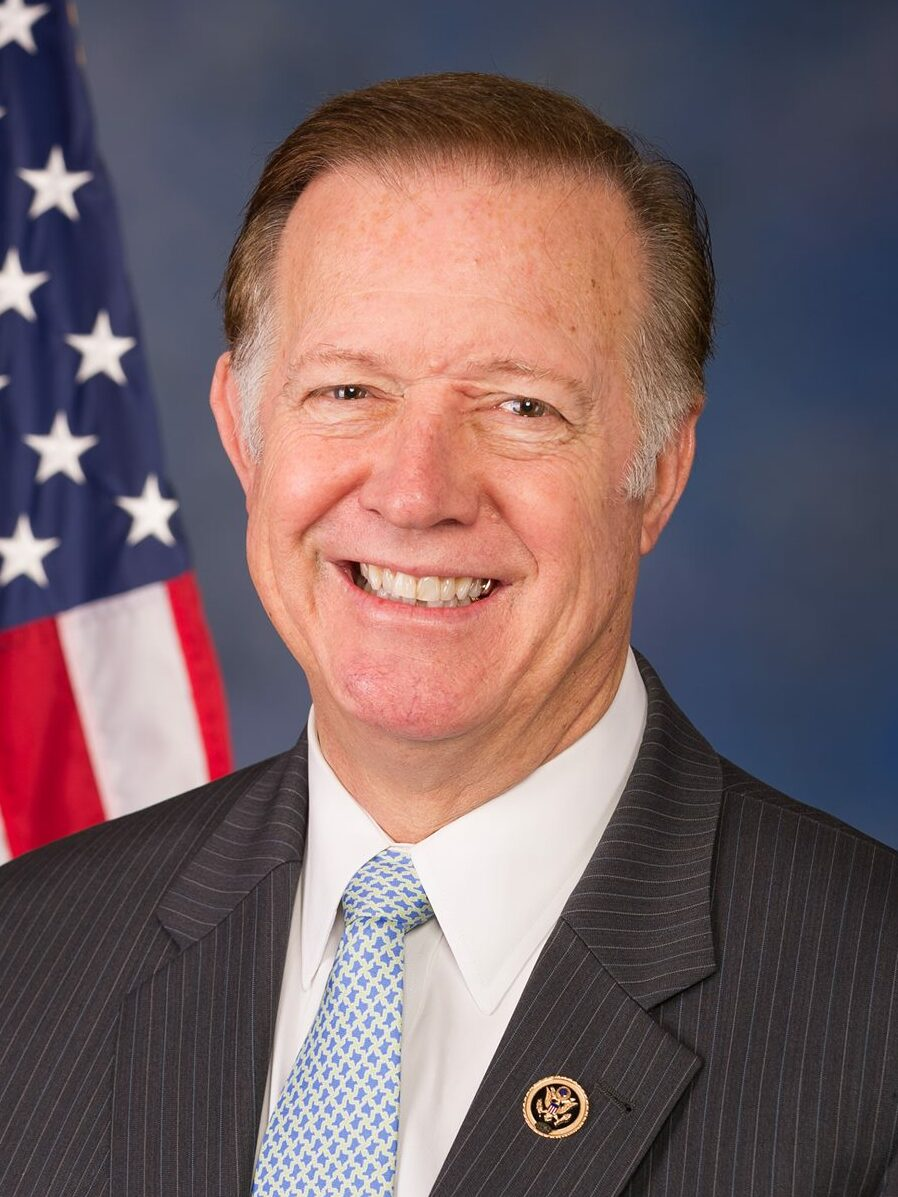

Nominee	Randy Weber	Donald Brown
Party	Republican	Democratic
Popular vote	90,116	52,545
Percentage	61.8%	36.1%
- County results Weber: 50–60% 60–70% 70–80%
U.S. Representative before election
Randy Weber
Republican
Elected U.S. Representative
Randy Weber
Republican

Incumbent Republican, Randy Weber, who had represented the district since 2013, ran for re-election. He won the seat in 2012 with 53% of the vote. The district had a PVI of R+12.

=== Republican primary ===
==== Results ====
Republican primary results
Party	Candidate	Votes	%
Republican	Randy Weber (incumbent)	34,131	100.0

=== Democratic primary ===
==== Candidates ====
===== Nominee =====
- Donald Brown, small business owner

===== Eliminated in primary =====
- Gagan Panjhazari
- Buck Willis

==== Results ====
Democratic primary results
Party	Candidate	Votes	%
Democratic	Don Brown	9,780	68.2
Democratic	Buck Willis	3,699	25.8
Democratic	Gagan Panjhazari	853	6.0
Total votes		14,332	100.0

=== Libertarian primary ===
==== Candidates ====
===== Nominee =====
- John Wieder, clergy and nominee for the 9th district in 2012

=== General election ===
==== Predictions ====
Source	Ranking	As of
The Cook Political Report	Safe R	November 3, 2014
Rothenberg	Safe R	October 24, 2014
Sabato's Crystal Ball	Safe R	October 30, 2014
RCP	Safe R	November 2, 2014
Daily Kos Elections	Safe R	November 4, 2014

==== Results ====
Texas's 14th congressional district, 2014
Party	Candidate	Votes	%
Republican	Randy Weber (incumbent)	90,116	61.8
Democratic	Donald Brown	52,545	36.1
Libertarian	John Wieder	3,037	2.1
Total votes		145,698	100.0
Republican hold			

== District 15 ==
2014 Texas's 15th congressional district election

Nominee	Ruben Hinojosa	Eddie Zamora
Party	Democratic	Republican
Popular vote	48,708	39,016
Percentage	54.0%	43.3%
- County results Hinojosa: 60–70% 70–80% 80–90% Zamora: 60–70% 70–80%
U.S. Representative before election
Ruben Hinojosa
Democratic
Elected U.S. Representative
Ruben Hinojosa
Democratic

Incumbent Democrat Rubén Hinojosa, who had represented the district since 1997, ran for re-election. He was re-elected in 2012 with 61% of the vote, and the district had a PVI of D+5.

=== Democratic primary ===
==== Candidates ====
===== Nominee =====
- Rubén Hinojosa, incumbent U.S. Representative

==== Results ====
Democratic primary results
Party	Candidate	Votes	%
Democratic	Rubén Hinojosa (incumbent)	29,916	100

=== Republican primary ===
==== Candidates ====
===== Nominee =====
- Eddie Zamora, sales consultant and candidate for this seat in 2012

===== Eliminated in primary =====
- Doug Carlile

==== Results ====
Republican primary results
Party	Candidate	Votes	%
Republican	Eddie Zamora	7,810	54.9
Republican	Doug Carlile	6,407	45.1
Total votes		14,217	100.0

=== Libertarian primary ===
==== Candidates ====
===== Nominee =====
- Johnny Partain

===== Eliminated in primary =====
- Ross Lynn Leone, candidate for the 35th district in 2012

=== General election ===
==== Predictions ====
Source	Ranking	As of
The Cook Political Report	Safe D	November 3, 2014
Rothenberg	Safe D	October 24, 2014
Sabato's Crystal Ball	Safe D	October 30, 2014
RCP	Safe D	November 2, 2014
Daily Kos Elections	Safe D	November 4, 2014

==== Results ====
Texas's 15th congressional district, 2014
Party	Candidate	Votes	%
Democratic	Ruben Hinojosa (incumbent)	48,708	54.0
Republican	Eddie Zamora	39,016	43.3
Libertarian	Johnny Partain	2,460	2.7
Total votes		90,184	100.0
Democratic hold			

== District 16 ==
2014 Texas's 16th congressional district election
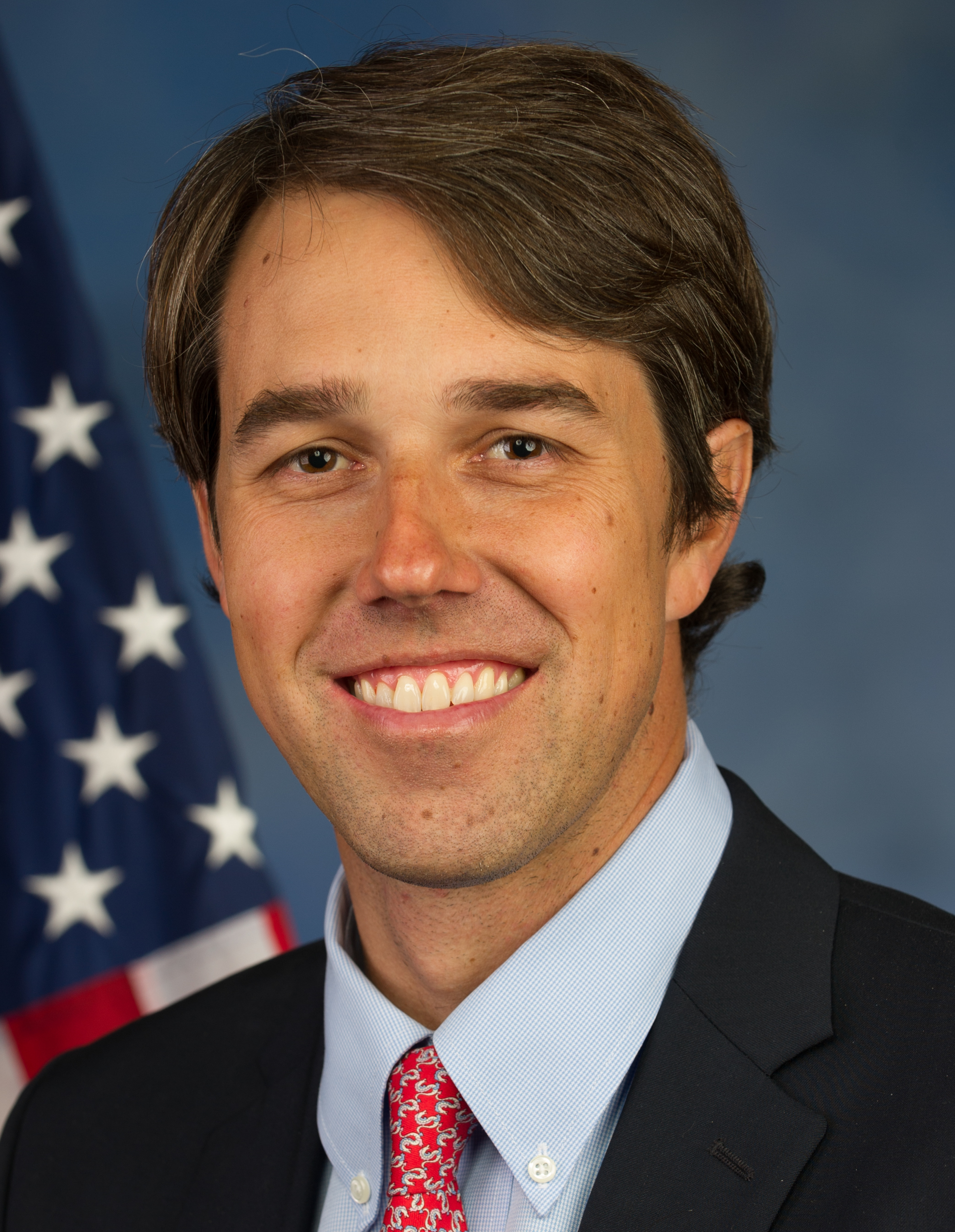

Nominee	Beto O'Rourke	Corey Roen
Party	Democratic	Republican
Popular vote	49,338	21,324
Percentage	67.5%	29.2%
- County results O'rourke: 60–70%
U.S. Representative before election
Beto O'Rourke
Democratic
Elected U.S. Representative
Beto O'Rourke
Democratic

Incumbent Democrat Beto O'Rourke, who had represented the district since 2013, ran for re-election. He was first elected in 2012 winning with 65% of the vote. The district had a PVI of D+5.

=== Democratic primary ===
==== Candidates ====
===== Nominee =====
- Beto O'Rourke, incumbent U.S. Representative

==== Results ====
Democratic primary results
Party	Candidate	Votes	%
Democratic	Beto O'Rourke (incumbent)	24,728	100.0

=== Republican primary ===
==== Candidates ====
===== Nominee =====
- Corey Roen, business owner and retired lieutenant colonel

==== Results ====
Republican primary results
Party	Candidate	Votes	%
Republican	Corey Roen	6,239	100.0

=== Libertarian primary ===
==== Candidates ====
===== Nominee =====
- Jaime Perez, professor

=== General election ===
==== Endorsements ====
Beto O'Rourke (D)

Labor unions

- AFL-CIO

==== Predictions ====
Source	Ranking	As of
The Cook Political Report	Safe D	November 3, 2014
Rothenberg	Safe D	October 24, 2014
Sabato's Crystal Ball	Safe D	October 30, 2014
RCP	Safe D	November 2, 2014
Daily Kos Elections	Safe D	November 4, 2014

==== Results ====
Texas's 16th congressional district, 2014
Party	Candidate	Votes	%
Democratic	Beto O'Rourke (incumbent)	49,338	67.5
Republican	Corey Roen	21,324	29.2
Libertarian	Jamie O. Perez	2,443	3.3
Total votes		73,105	100.0
Democratic hold			

== District 17 ==
2014 Texas's 17th congressional district election
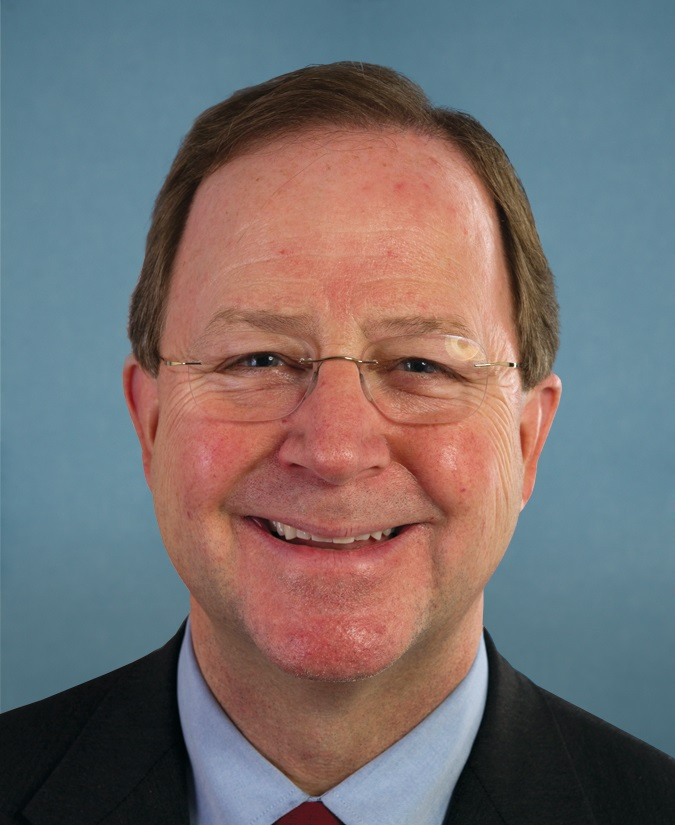

Nominee	Bill Flores	Nick Haynes
Party	Republican	Democratic
Popular vote	85,807	43,049
Percentage	64.6%	32.4%
- County results Flores: 60–70% 70–80% 80–90% Haynes: 50–60%
U.S. Representative before election
Bill Flores
Republican
Elected U.S. Representative
Bill Flores
Republican

Incumbent Republican Bill Flores, who had represented the district since 2011, ran for re-election. He was re-elected in 2012 with 80% of the vote, and the district had a PVI of R+13.

=== Republican primary ===
==== Results ====
Republican primary results
Party	Candidate	Votes	%
Republican	Bill Flores (incumbent)	32,770	100.0

=== Democratic primary ===
==== Candidates ====
===== Nominee =====
- Nick Haynes

==== Results ====
Democratic primary results
Party	Candidate	Votes	%
Democratic	Nick Haynes	10,141	100.0

=== Libertarian primary ===
==== Candidates ====
===== Nominee =====
- Shawn Hamilton

===== Eliminated in primary =====
- Bill Oliver

=== General election ===
==== Predictions ====
Source	Ranking	As of
The Cook Political Report	Safe R	November 3, 2014
Rothenberg	Safe R	October 24, 2014
Sabato's Crystal Ball	Safe R	October 30, 2014
RCP	Safe R	November 2, 2014
Daily Kos Elections	Safe R	November 4, 2014

==== Results ====
Texas's 17th congressional district, 2014
Party	Candidate	Votes	%
Republican	Bill Flores (incumbent)	85,807	64.6
Democratic	Nick Haynes	43,049	32.4
Libertarian	Shawn Michael Hamilton	4,009	3.0
Total votes		132,865	100.0
Republican hold			

== District 18 ==
2014 Texas's 18th congressional district election
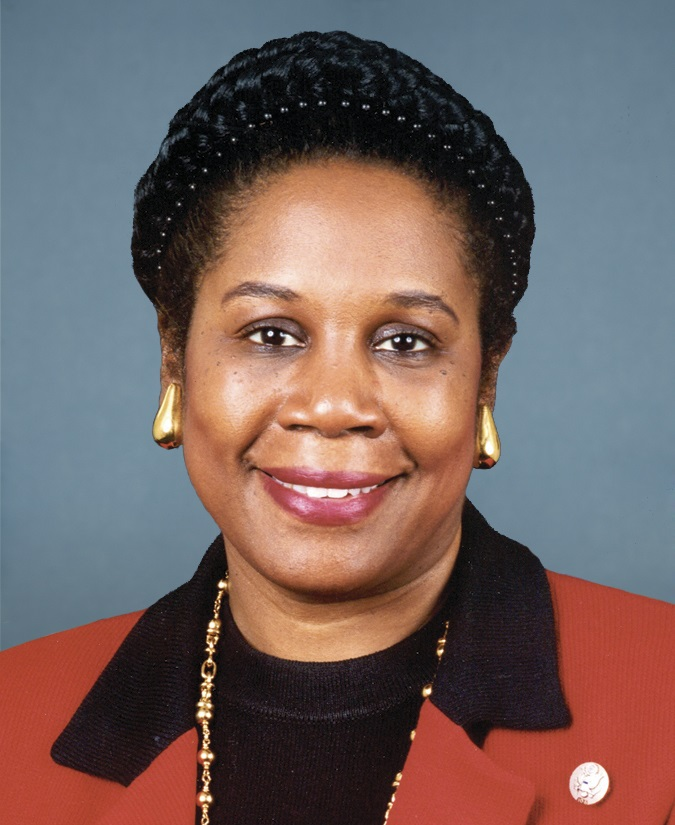

Nominee	Sheila Jackson Lee	Sean Seibert
Party	Democratic	Republican
Popular vote	76,097	26,249
Percentage	71.8%	24.8%
- County results Lee: 70–80%
U.S. Representative before election
Sheila Jackson Lee
Democratic
Elected U.S. Representative
Sheila Jackson Lee
Democratic

Incumbent Democrat Sheila Jackson Lee, who had represented the district since 1995, ran for re-election. She was re-elected in 2012 with 75% of the vote, and the district had a PVI of D+24.

=== Democratic primary ===
==== Results ====
Democratic primary results
Party	Candidate	Votes	%
Democratic	Sheila Jackson Lee (incumbent)	14,373	100.0

=== Republican primary ===
==== Candidates ====
===== Nominee =====
- Sean Seibert, Afghanistan veteran and nominee for this seat in 2012

==== Results ====
Republican primary results
Party	Candidate	Votes	%
Republican	Sean Seibert	6,527	100.0

=== Libertarian primary ===
==== Candidates ====
===== Nominee =====
- Jennifer Whelan

=== Green primary ===
==== Candidates ====
===== Nominee =====
- Remington Alessi

=== General election ===
==== Endorsements ====
Sheila Jackson Lee (D)

Labor unions

- AFL-CIO

==== Predictions ====
Source	Ranking	As of
The Cook Political Report	Safe D	November 3, 2014
Rothenberg	Safe D	October 24, 2014
Sabato's Crystal Ball	Safe D	October 30, 2014
RCP	Safe D	November 2, 2014
Daily Kos Elections	Safe D	November 4, 2014

==== Results ====
Texas's 18th congressional district, 2014
Party	Candidate	Votes	%
Democratic	Sheila Jackson Lee (incumbent)	76,097	71.8
Republican	Sean Seibert	26,249	24.8
Independent	Vince Duncan	2,362	2.2
Green	Remington Alessi	1,302	1.2
Total votes		106,010	100.0
Democratic hold			

== District 19 ==
2014 Texas's 19th congressional district election
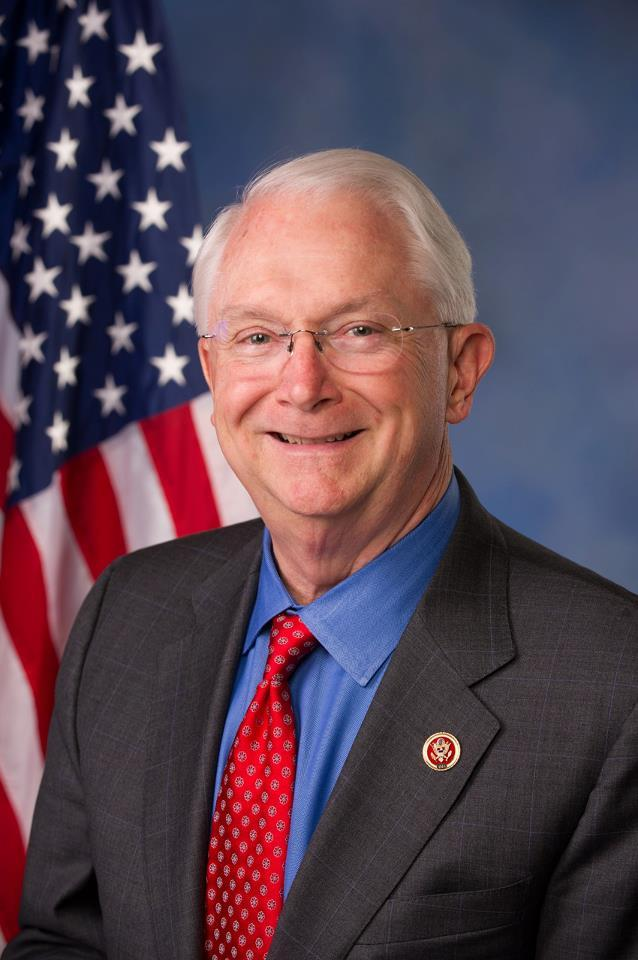

Nominee	Randy Neugebauer	Neal Marchbanks
Party	Republican	Democratic
Popular vote	90,160	21,458
Percentage	77.2%	18.4%
- County results Neugebauer: 60–70% 70–80% 80–90% 90–100%
U.S. Representative before election
Randy Neugebauer
Republican
Elected U.S. Representative
Randy Neugebauer
Republican

Incumbent Republican Randy Neugebauer, who had represented the district since 2003, ran for re-election. He was re-elected in 2012 with 85% of the vote, and the district had a PVI of R+26.

=== Republican primary ===
==== Candidates ====
===== Nominee =====
- Randy Neugebauer, incumbent U.S. Representative

===== Eliminated in primary =====
- Donald May, physician
- Chris Winn, former Chair of the Lubbock County Republican Party and candidate for this seat in 2012.

==== Results ====
Republican primary results
Party	Candidate	Votes	%
Republican	Randy Neugebauer (incumbent)	39,611	64.4
Republican	Donald May	14,498	23.5
Republican	Chris Winn	7,429	12.1
Total votes		61,538	100.0

=== Democratic primary ===
==== Candidates ====
===== Nominee =====
- Neal Marchbanks, meteorologist

==== Results ====
Democratic primary results
Party	Candidate	Votes	%
Democratic	Neal Marchbanks	6,476	100.0

=== Libertarian primary ===
==== Candidates ====
===== Nominee =====
- Richard Peterson

=== Green primary ===
==== Candidates ====
===== Nominee =====
- Mark Lawson

=== General election ===
==== Predictions ====
Source	Ranking	As of
The Cook Political Report	Safe R	November 3, 2014
Rothenberg	Safe R	October 24, 2014
Sabato's Crystal Ball	Safe R	October 30, 2014
RCP	Safe R	November 2, 2014
Daily Kos Elections	Safe R	November 4, 2014

==== Results ====
Texas's 19th congressional district, 2014
Party	Candidate	Votes	%
Republican	Randy Neugebauer (incumbent)	90,160	77.2
Democratic	Neal Marchbanks	21,458	18.4
Libertarian	Richard (Chip) Peterson	5,146	4.4
Independent	Donald Vance (write-in)	54	0.0
Total votes		116,818	100.0
Republican hold			

== District 20 ==
2014 Texas's 20th congressional district election
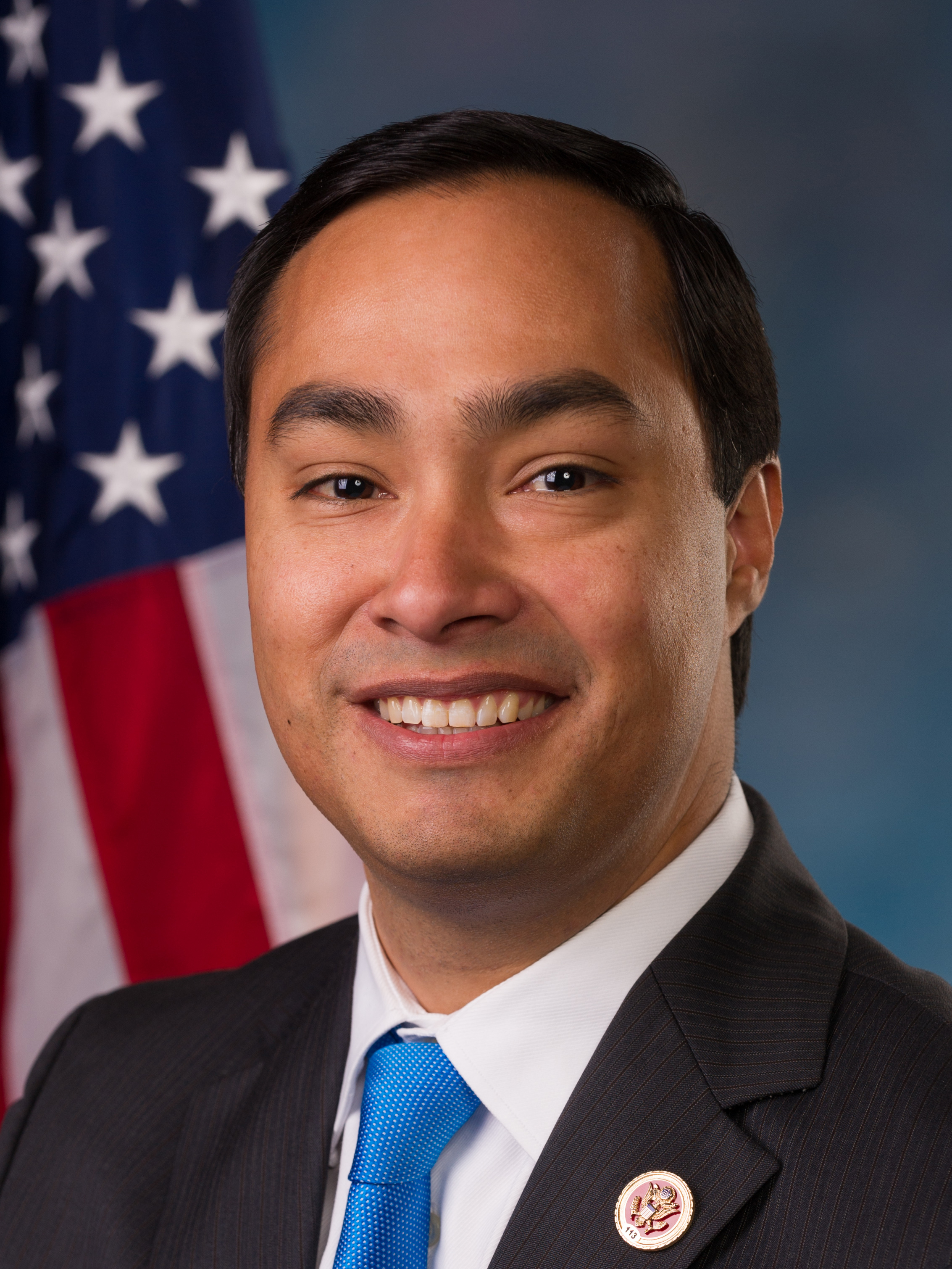

Nominee	Joaquin Castro	Jeffrey C. Blunt
Party	Democratic	Libertarian
Popular vote	66,554	21,410
Percentage	75.7%	24.3%
- County results Castro: 70–80%
U.S. Representative before election
Joaquin Castro
Democratic
Elected U.S. Representative
Joaquin Castro
Democratic

Incumbent Democrat Joaquín Castro, who had represented the district since 2013. He was elected in 2012 with 64% of the vote. The district had a PVI of D+6.

=== Democratic primary ===
==== Candidates ====
===== Nominee =====
- Joaquín Castro, incumbent U.S. Representative

==== Results ====
Democratic primary results
Party	Candidate	Votes	%
Democratic	Joaquín Castro (incumbent)	16,275	100.0

=== Republican primary ===
No Republicans filed to run.

=== Libertarian primary ===
==== Candidates ====
===== Nominee =====
- Jeffrey Blunt

=== General election ===
==== Predictions ====
Source	Ranking	As of
The Cook Political Report	Safe D	November 3, 2014
Rothenberg	Safe D	October 24, 2014
Sabato's Crystal Ball	Safe D	October 30, 2014
RCP	Safe D	November 2, 2014
Daily Kos Elections	Safe D	November 4, 2014

==== Results ====
Texas's 20th congressional district, 2014
Party	Candidate	Votes	%
Democratic	Joaquin Castro (incumbent)	66,554	75.7
Libertarian	Jeffrey C. Blunt	21,410	24.3
Total votes		87,964	100.0
Democratic hold			

== District 21 ==
2014 Texas's 21st congressional district election
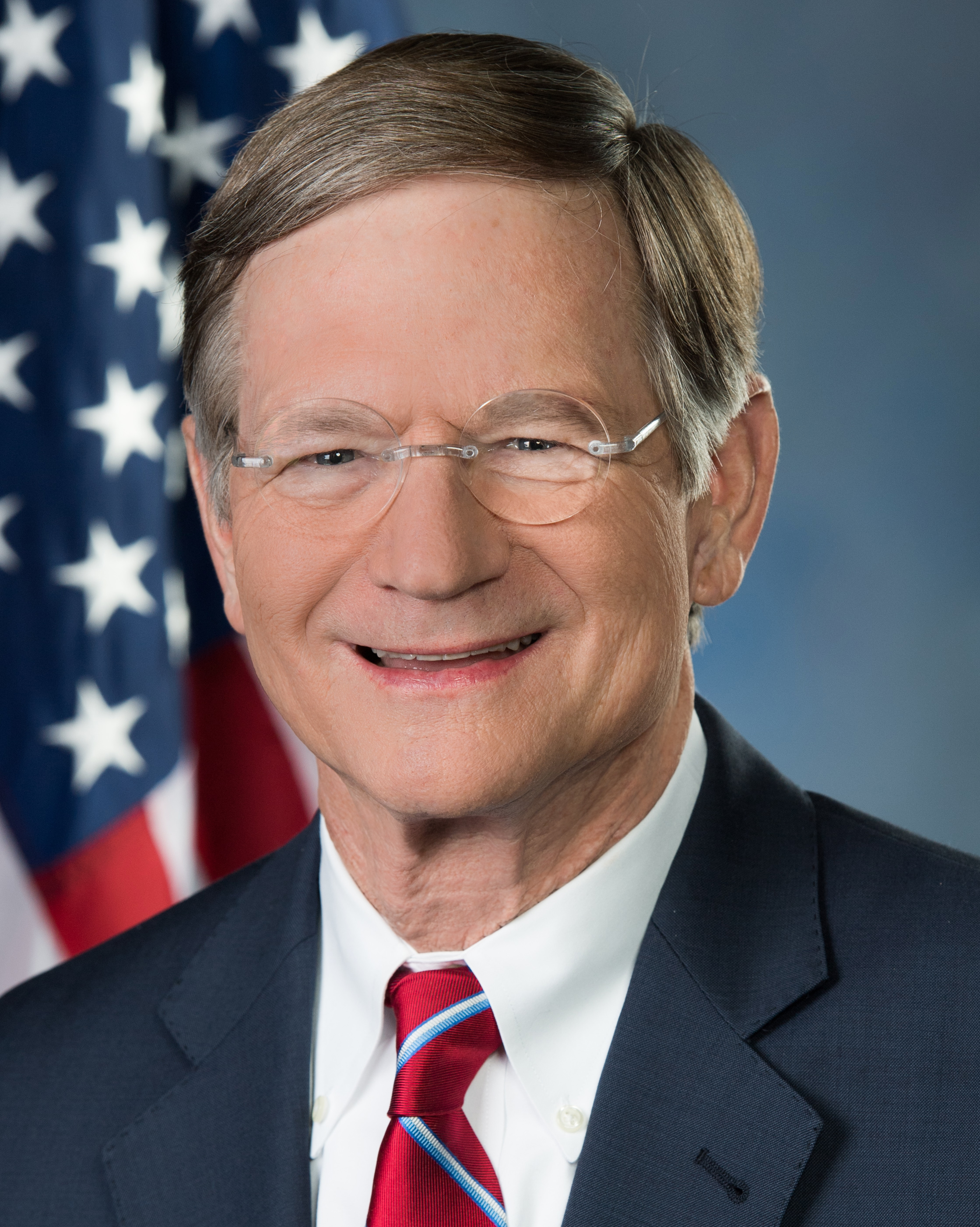

Nominee	Lamar Smith	Antonio Diaz	Ryan Shields
Party	Republican	Green	Libertarian
Popular vote	135,660	27,831	25,505
Percentage	71.8%	14.7%	13.5%
- County results Smith: 40–50% 60–70% 70–80% 80–90%
U.S. Representative before election
Lamar Smith
Republican
Elected U.S. Representative
Lamar Smith
Republican

Incumbent Republican Lamar Smith, who had represented the district since 1987, ran for re-election. He was re-elected in 2012 with 61% of the vote, and the district had a PVI of R+12.

=== Republican primary ===
==== Candidates ====
===== Nominee =====
- Lamar Smith, incumbent U.S. Representative

===== Eliminated in primary =====
- Matt McCall, small business owner
- Michael Smith

==== Results ====
Republican primary results
Party	Candidate	Votes	%
Republican	Lamar S. Smith (incumbent)	40,441	60.4
Republican	Matt McCall	22,681	33.9
Republican	Michael J. Smith	3,796	5.7
Total votes		66,918	100.0

=== Democratic primary ===
No Democrats filed.

=== Libertarian primary ===
==== Candidates ====
===== Nominee =====
- Ryan Shields, oilfield worker

===== Eliminated in primary =====
- David Cunningham
- Mark Loewe, researcher

=== Green primary ===
==== Candidates ====
===== Nominee =====
- Antonio Diaz, small business owner

=== General election ===
==== Predictions ====
Source	Ranking	As of
The Cook Political Report	Safe R	November 3, 2014
Rothenberg	Safe R	October 24, 2014
Sabato's Crystal Ball	Safe R	October 30, 2014
RCP	Safe R	November 2, 2014
Daily Kos Elections	Safe R	November 4, 2014

==== Results ====
Texas's 21st congressional district, 2014
Party	Candidate	Votes	%
Republican	Lamar Smith (incumbent)	135,660	71.8
Green	Antonio Diaz	27,831	14.7
Libertarian	Ryan Shields	25,505	13.5
Total votes		188,996	100.0
Republican hold			

== District 22 ==
2014 Texas's 22nd congressional district election
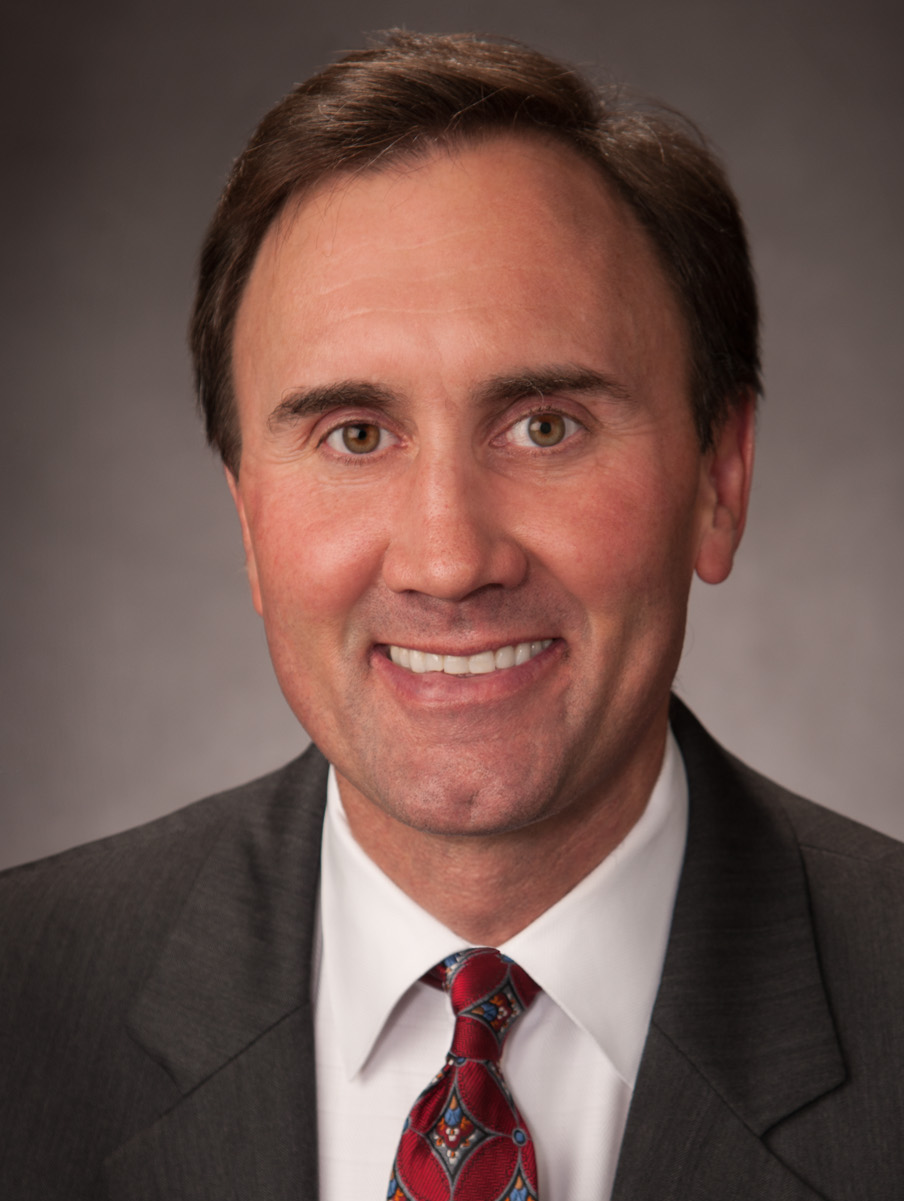

Nominee	Pete Olson	Frank Briscoe
Party	Republican	Democratic
Popular vote	100,861	47,844
Percentage	66.5%	31.6%
- County results Olson: 60–70%
U.S. Representative before election
Pete Olson
Republican
Elected U.S. Representative
Pete Olson
Republican

Incumbent Republican Pete Olson, who had represented the district since 2009, ran for re-election. He was re-elected in 2012 with 64% of the vote, and the district had a PVI of R+15.

=== Republican primary ===
==== Candidates ====
===== Nominee =====
- Pete Olson, incumbent U.S. Representative

==== Results ====
Republican primary results
Party	Candidate	Votes	%
Republican	Pete Olson (incumbent)	33,167	100.0

=== Democratic primary ===
==== Candidates ====
===== Nominee =====
- Frank Briscoe, small business owner

===== Eliminated in primary =====
- Mark Gibson, attorney

==== Results ====
Democratic primary results
Party	Candidate	Votes	%
Democratic	Frank Briscoe	3,378	53.2
Democratic	Mark Gibson	2,973	46.8
Total votes		6,351	100.0

=== Libertarian primary ===
==== Candidates ====
===== Nominee =====
- Rob Lapham

=== General election ===
==== Predictions ====
Source	Ranking	As of
The Cook Political Report	Safe R	November 3, 2014
Rothenberg	Safe R	October 24, 2014
Sabato's Crystal Ball	Safe R	October 30, 2014
RCP	Safe R	November 2, 2014
Daily Kos Elections	Safe R	November 4, 2014

==== Results ====
Texas's 22nd congressional district, 2014
Party	Candidate	Votes	%
Republican	Pete Olson (incumbent)	100,861	66.5
Democratic	Frank Briscoe	47,844	31.6
Libertarian	Rob Lapham	2,861	1.9
Total votes		151,566	100.0
Republican hold			

== District 23 ==
2014 Texas's 23rd congressional district election
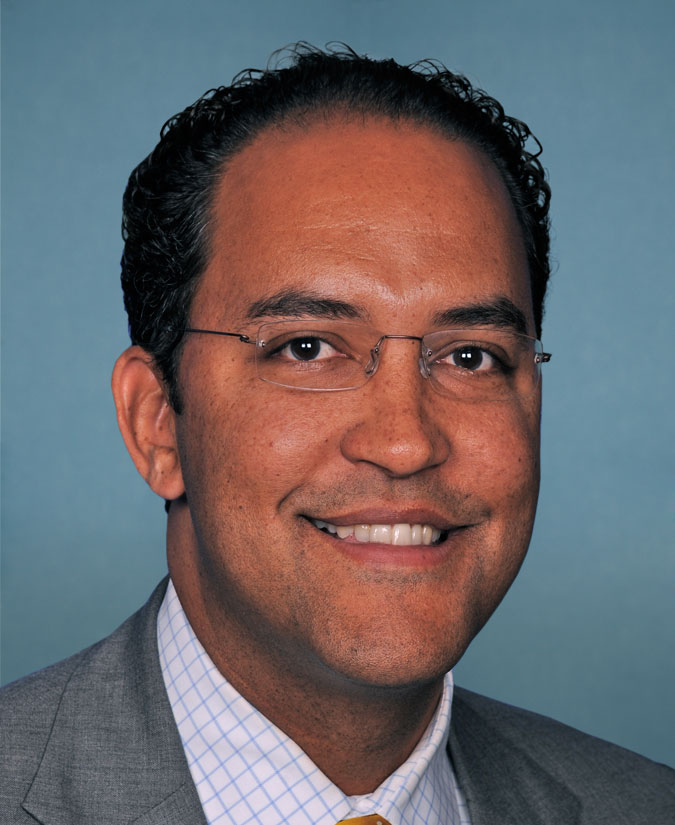

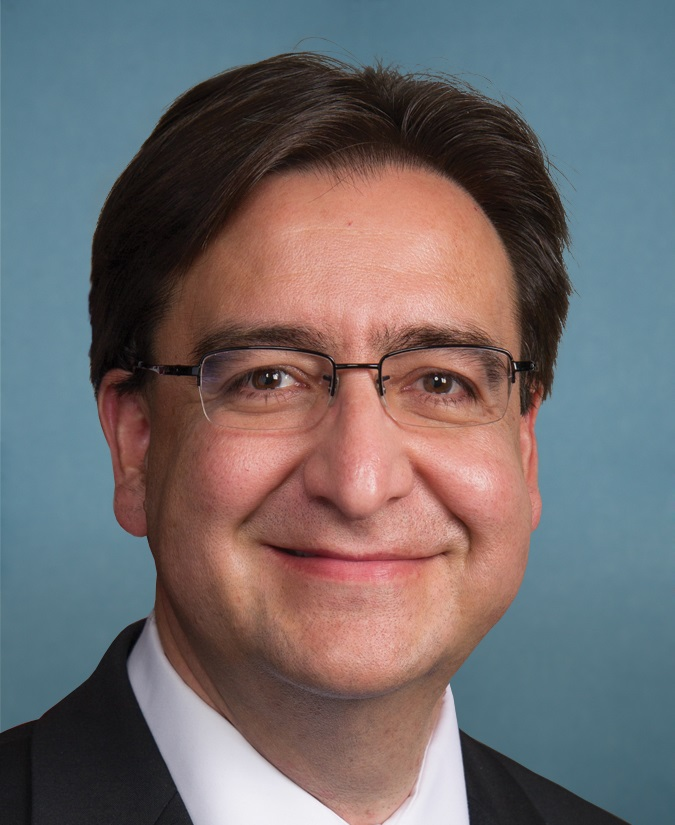
Nominee	Will Hurd	Pete Gallego
Party	Republican	Democratic
Popular vote	57,459	55,037
Percentage	49.8%	47.7%
- County results Hurd: 50–60% 60–70% 70–80% Gallego: 50–60% 60–70% 70–80%
U.S. Representative before election
Pete Gallego
Democratic
Elected U.S. Representative
Will Hurd
Republican

Incumbent Democrat Pete Gallego, who had represented the district since 2013, ran for re-election. He was first elected in 2012, defeating Republican incumbent Quico Canseco with 50% of the vote. The district had a PVI of R+3.

=== Democratic primary ===
==== Candidates ====
===== Nominee =====
- Pete Gallego, incumbent U.S. Representative

==== Results ====
Democratic primary results
Party	Candidate	Votes	%
Democratic	Pete P. Gallego (incumbent)	26,484	100.0

=== Republican primary ===
Soon after the 2012 election, Republicans began recruiting new candidates to challenge Gallego in 2014.

==== Candidates ====
===== Nominee =====
- Will Hurd, former CIA officer and candidate for this seat in 2010

===== Eliminated in primary =====
- Quico Canseco, former U.S. Representative
- Robert Lowry, political activist

===== Declined =====
- Rolando Pablos, public utility commissioner and former chairman of the board for the Museo Alameda

==== Results ====
Republican primary results
Party	Candidate	Votes	%
Republican	Will Hurd	10,496	41.0
Republican	Quico Canseco	10,332	40.3
Republican	Robert Lowry	4,796	18.7
Total votes		25,624	100.0

==== Runoff ====
===== Results =====
Republican primary runoff results
Party	Candidate	Votes	%
Republican	Will Hurd	8,699	59.5
Republican	Quico Canseco	5,930	40.5
Total votes		14,629	100.0

=== Libertarian primary ===
==== Candidates ====
===== Nominee =====
- Ruben Corvalan

=== General election ===
==== Predictions ====
Source	Ranking	As of
The Cook Political Report	Lean D	November 3, 2014
Rothenberg	Lean D	October 24, 2014
Sabato's Crystal Ball	Lean D	October 30, 2014
RCP	Lean D	November 2, 2014
Daily Kos Elections	Lean D	November 4, 2014

==== Results ====
Hurd was elected with 49.78% of the vote, making this the only U.S. House seat in Texas to flip in 2014.

Texas's 23rd congressional district, 2014
Party	Candidate	Votes	%
Republican	Will Hurd	57,459	49.8
Democratic	Pete Gallego (incumbent)	55,037	47.7
Libertarian	Ruben Corvalan	2,933	2.5
Total votes		115,429	100.0
Republican gain from Democratic			

== District 24 ==
2014 Texas's 24th congressional district election
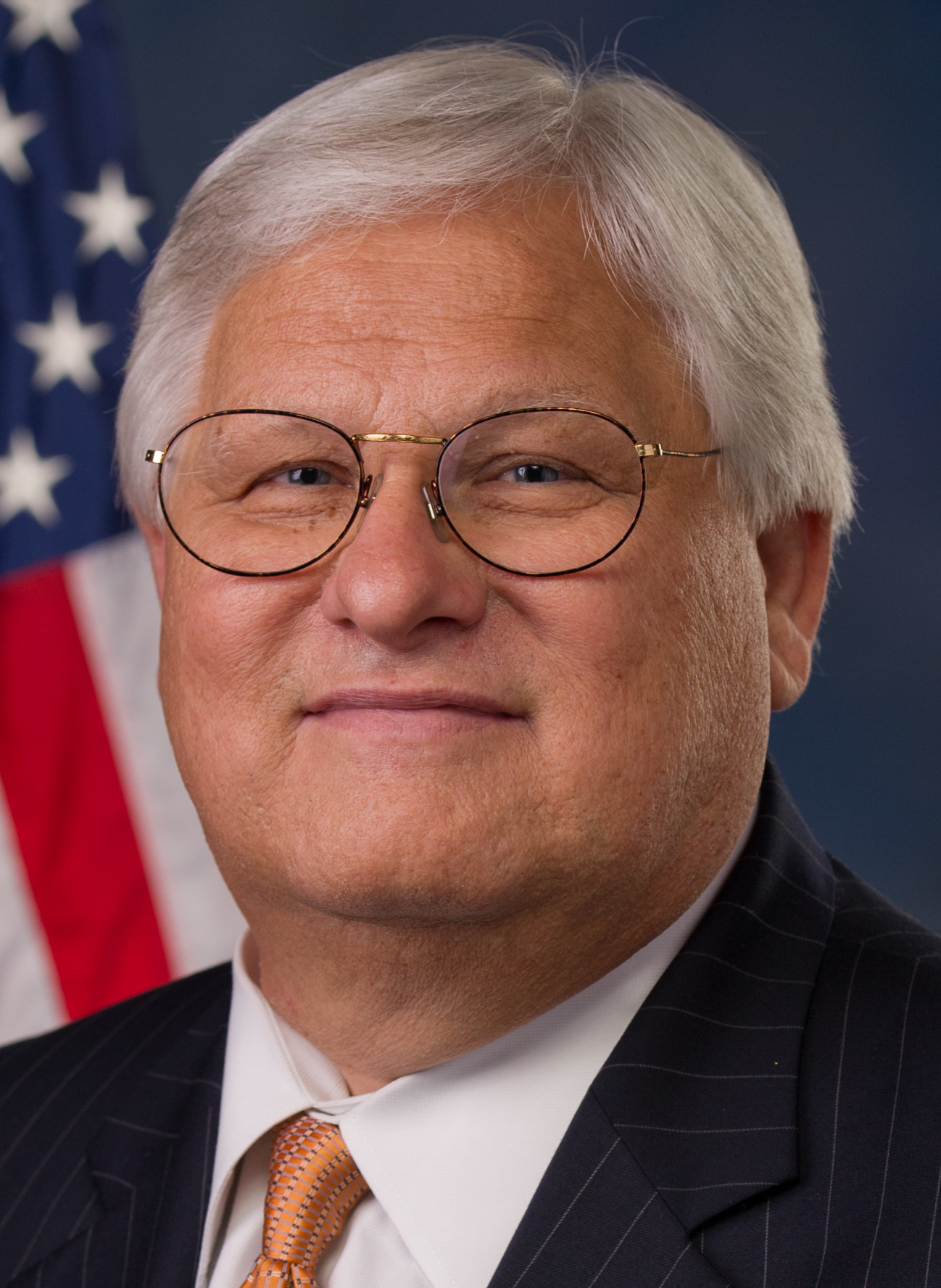

Nominee	Kenny Marchant	Patrick McGehearty
Party	Republican	Democratic
Popular vote	93,712	46,548
Percentage	65.0%	32.3%
- County results Marchant: 50–60% 60–70% 70–80%
U.S. Representative before election
Kenny Marchant
Republican
Elected U.S. Representative
Kenny Marchant
Republican

Incumbent Republican Kenny Marchant, who had represented the district since 2005, ran for re-election. He was re-elected in 2012 with 61% of the vote, and the district had a PVI of R+13.

=== Republican primary ===
==== Candidates ====
===== Nominee =====
- Kenny Marchant, incumbent U.S. Representative

==== Results ====
Republican primary results
Party	Candidate	Votes	%
Republican	Kenny Marchant (incumbent)	34,265	100.0

=== Democratic primary ===
==== Candidates ====
===== Nominee =====
- Patrick McGehearty, computer scientist

==== Results ====
Democratic primary results
Party	Candidate	Votes	%
Democratic	Patrick McGehearty	8,247	100.0

=== Libertarian primary ===
==== Candidates ====
===== Nominee =====
- Mike Kolls, project manager at UTSW

=== General election ===
==== Endorsements ====
Patrick McGehearty (D)

Labor unions

- AFL-CIO

==== Predictions ====
Source	Ranking	As of
The Cook Political Report	Safe R	November 3, 2014
Rothenberg	Safe R	October 24, 2014
Sabato's Crystal Ball	Safe R	October 30, 2014
RCP	Safe R	November 2, 2014
Daily Kos Elections	Safe R	November 4, 2014

==== Results ====
Texas's 24th congressional district, 2014
Party	Candidate	Votes	%
Republican	Kenny Marchant (incumbent)	93,712	65.0
Democratic	Patrick McGehearty	46,548	32.3
Libertarian	Mike Kolls	3,813	2.7
Total votes		144,073	100.0
Republican hold			

== District 25 ==
2014 Texas's 25th congressional district election
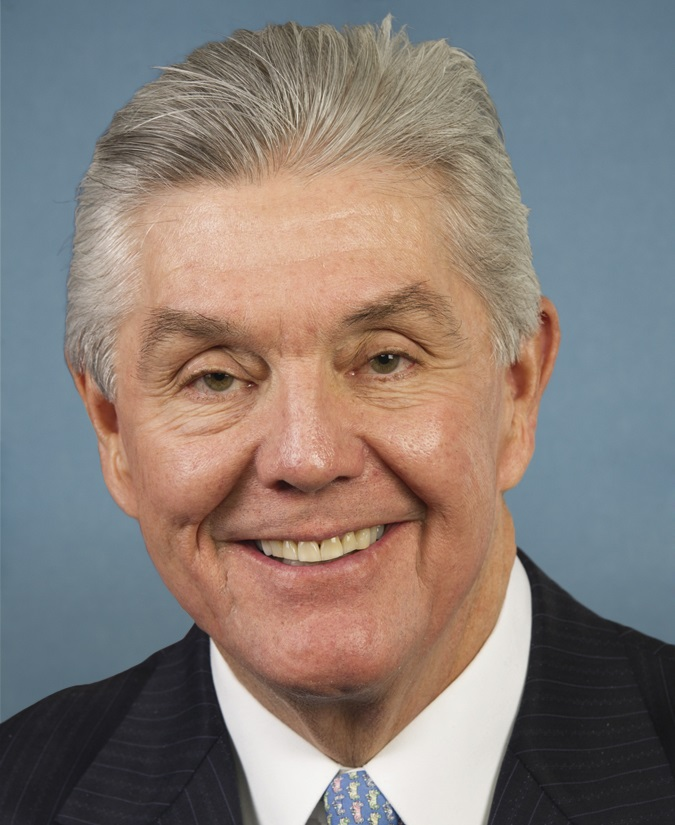

Nominee	Roger Williams	Marco Montoya
Party	Republican	Democratic
Popular vote	107,120	64,463
Percentage	60.2%	36.2%
- County results Williams: 60–70% 70–80% 80–90% Montoya: 50–60% 60–70%
U.S. Representative before election
Roger Williams
Republican
Elected U.S. Representative
Roger Williams
Republican

Incumbent Republican Roger Williams, who had represented the district since 2013, ran for re-election. He was elected in 2012 with 58% of the vote. The district has a PVI of R+12.

=== Republican primary ===
==== Candidates ====
===== Nominee =====
- Roger Williams, incumbent U.S. Representative

==== Results ====
Republican primary results
Party	Candidate	Votes	%
Republican	Roger Williams (incumbent)	43,030	100.0

=== Democratic primary ===
==== Candidates ====
===== Nominee =====
- Marco Montoya, public health service professional

===== Eliminated in primary =====
- Stuart Gourd, attorney

==== Results ====
Democratic primary results
Party	Candidate	Votes	%
Democratic	Marco Montoya	11,691	75.2
Democratic	Stuart Gourd	3,863	24.8
Total votes		15,554	100.0

=== Libertarian primary ===
==== Candidates ====
===== Nominee =====
- John Betz

=== General election ===
==== Predictions ====
Source	Ranking	As of
The Cook Political Report	Safe R	November 3, 2014
Rothenberg	Safe R	October 24, 2014
Sabato's Crystal Ball	Safe R	October 30, 2014
RCP	Safe R	November 2, 2014
Daily Kos Elections	Safe R	November 4, 2014

==== Results ====
Texas's 25th congressional district, 2014
Party	Candidate	Votes	%
Republican	Roger Williams (incumbent)	107,120	60.2
Democratic	Marco Montoya	64,463	36.3
Libertarian	John Betz	6,300	3.5
Total votes		177,883	100.0
Republican hold			

== District 26 ==
2014 Texas's 26th congressional district election
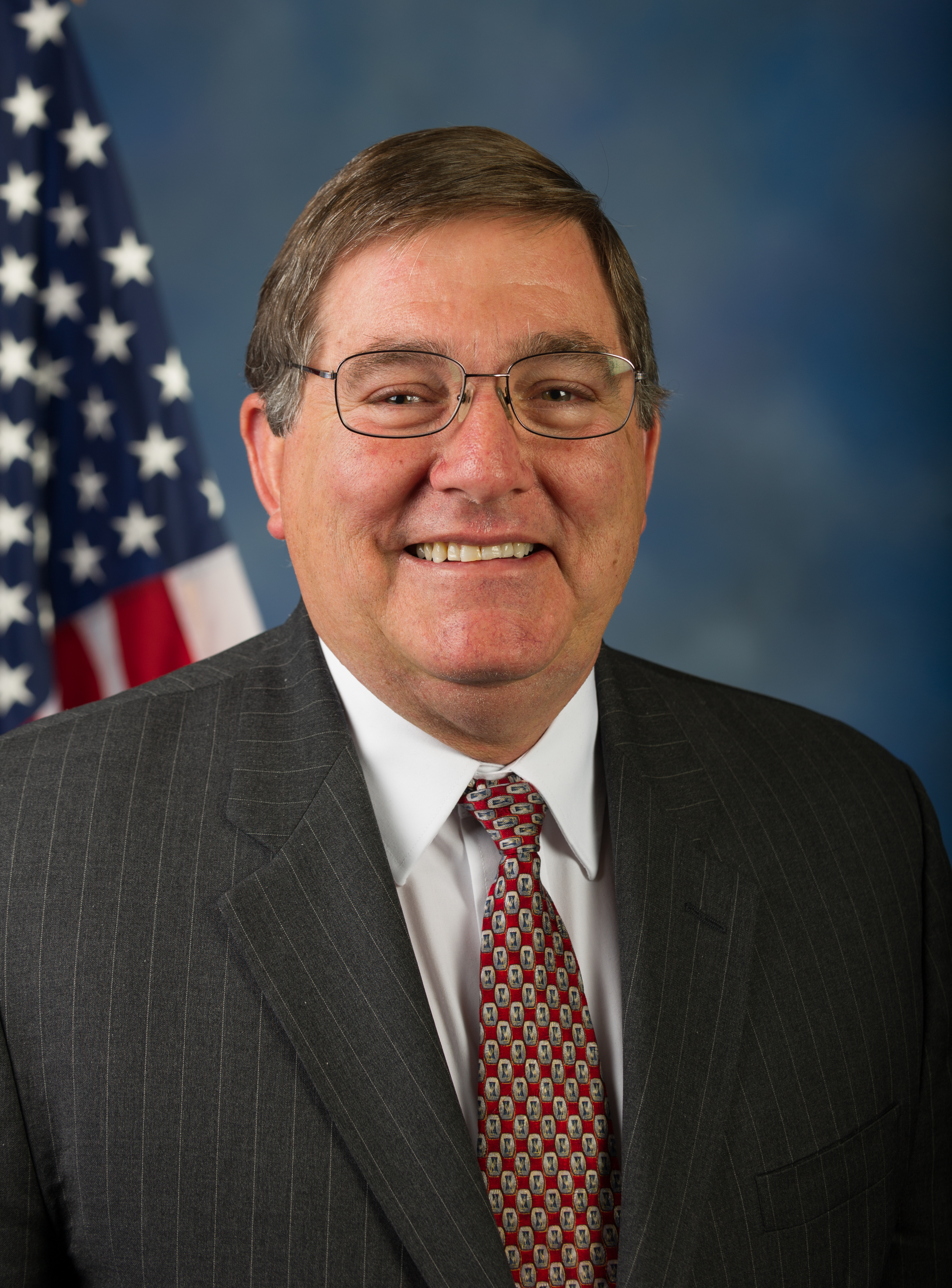

Nominee	Michael Burgess	Mark Boler
Party	Republican	Libertarian
Popular vote	116,944	24,526
Percentage	82.7%	17.3%
- County results Burgess: 80–90%
U.S. Representative before election
Michael Burgess
Republican
Elected U.S. Representative
Michael Burgess
Republican

Incumbent Republican Michael C. Burgess, who had represented the district since 2003, ran for re-election. He was re-elected in 2012 with 68% of the vote, and the district had a PVI of R+20.

=== Republican primary ===
==== Candidates ====
===== Nominee =====
- Michael C. Burgess, incumbent U.S. Representative

===== Eliminated in primary =====
- Joel A. Krause, small business owner
- Divenchy Watrous

==== Results ====
Republican primary results
Party	Candidate	Votes	%
Republican	Michael C. Burgess (incumbent)	33,909	82.6
Republican	Joel A. Krause	6,433	15.7
Republican	Divenchy Watrous	698	1.7
Total votes		41,040	100.0

=== Democratic primary ===
No Democrats filed to run.

=== Libertarian primary ===
==== Candidates ====
===== Nominee =====
- Mark Boler, computer scientist and nominee for this seat in 2012

=== General election ===
==== Predictions ====
Source	Ranking	As of
The Cook Political Report	Safe R	November 3, 2014
Rothenberg	Safe R	October 24, 2014
Sabato's Crystal Ball	Safe R	October 30, 2014
RCP	Safe R	November 2, 2014
Daily Kos Elections	Safe R	November 4, 2014

==== Results ====
Texas's 26th congressional district, 2014
Party	Candidate	Votes	%
Republican	Michael Burgess (incumbent)	116,944	82.7
Libertarian	Mark Boler	24,526	17.3
Total votes		141,470	100.0
Republican hold			

== District 27 ==
2014 Texas's 27th congressional district election
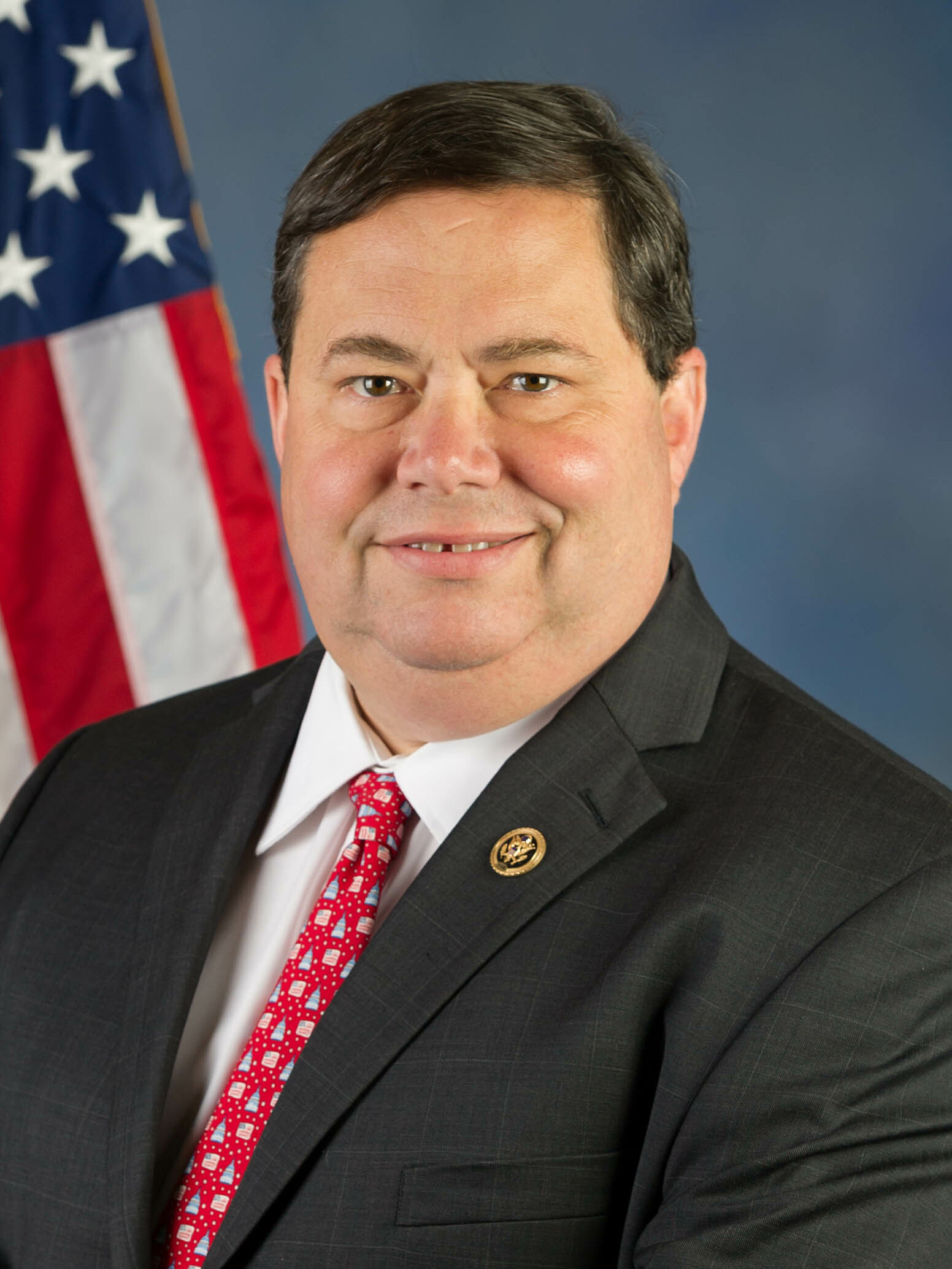

Nominee	Blake Farenthold	Wesley Reed
Party	Republican	Democratic
Popular vote	83,342	44,152
Percentage	63.6%	33.7%
- County results Farenthold: 50–60% 60–70% 70–80% 80–90%
U.S. Representative before election
Blake Farenthold
Republican
Elected U.S. Representative
Blake Farenthold
Republican

Incumbent Republican Blake Farenthold, who had represented the district since 2011, ran for re-election. He was re-elected in 2012 with 57% of the vote, and the district had a PVI of R+13.

=== Republican primary ===
==== Candidates ====
===== Nominee =====
- Blake Farenthold, incumbent U.S. Representative

==== Results ====
Republican primary results
Party	Candidate	Votes	%
Republican	Blake Farenthold (incumbent)	32,727	100.0

=== Democratic primary ===
==== Candidates ====
===== Nominee =====
- Wesley Reed, pilot

==== Results ====
Democratic primary results
Party	Candidate	Votes	%
Democratic	Wesley Reed	11,585	100.0

=== Libertarian primary ===
==== Candidates ====
===== Nominee =====
- Roxanne Simonson

=== General election ===
==== Endorsements ====
Wesley Reed (D)

Labor unions

- AFL-CIO

==== Predictions ====
Source	Ranking	As of
The Cook Political Report	Safe R	November 3, 2014
Rothenberg	Safe R	October 24, 2014
Sabato's Crystal Ball	Safe R	October 30, 2014
RCP	Safe R	November 2, 2014
Daily Kos Elections	Safe R	November 4, 2014

==== Results ====
Texas's 27th congressional district, 2014
Party	Candidate	Votes	%
Republican	Blake Farenthold (incumbent)	83,342	63.6
Democratic	Wesley Reed	44,152	33.7
Libertarian	Roxanne Simonson	3,553	2.7
Total votes		131,047	100.0
Republican hold			

== District 28 ==
2014 Texas's 28th congressional district election
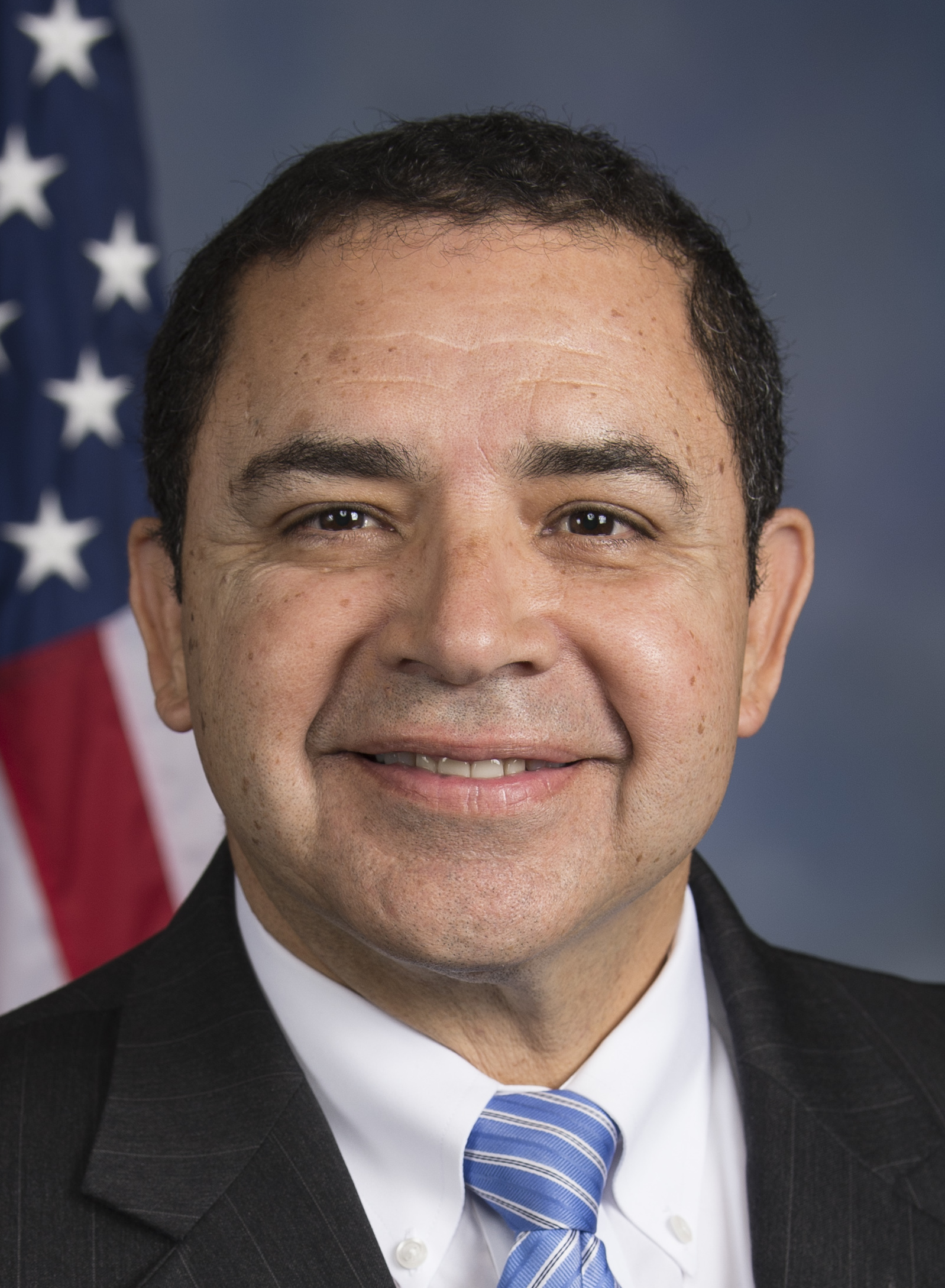

Nominee	Henry Cuellar	William Aikens
Party	Democratic	Libertarian
Popular vote	62,058	10,153
Percentage	82.1%	13.3%
- County results Cuellar: 60–70% 70–80% 80–90% 90–100%
U.S. Representative before election
Henry Cuellar
Democratic
Elected U.S. Representative
Henry Cuellar
Democratic

Incumbent Democrat Henry Cuellar, who had represented the district since 2005, ran for re-election. He was re-elected in 2012 with 68% of the vote, and the district had a PVI of D+7.

=== Democratic primary ===
==== Candidates ====
===== Nominee =====
- Henry Cuellar, incumbent U.S. Representative

==== Results ====
Democratic primary results
Party	Candidate	Votes	%
Democratic	Henry Cuellar (incumbent)	36,821	100.0

=== Republican primary ===
No Republicans filed to run.

=== Libertarian primary ===
==== Candidates ====
===== Nominee =====
- William Aikens

=== Green primary ===
==== Candidates ====
===== Nominee =====
- Michael Cary, nominee for this seat in 2012

=== General election ===
==== Predictions ====
Source	Ranking	As of
The Cook Political Report	Safe D	November 3, 2014
Rothenberg	Safe D	October 24, 2014
Sabato's Crystal Ball	Safe D	October 30, 2014
RCP	Safe D	November 2, 2014
Daily Kos Elections	Safe D	November 4, 2014

==== Results ====
Texas's 28th congressional district, 2014
Party	Candidate	Votes	%
Democratic	Henry Cuellar (incumbent)	62,508	82.1
Libertarian	William Aikens	10,153	13.3
Green	Michael Cary	3,475	4.6
Total votes		76,136	100.0
Democratic hold			

== District 29 ==
2014 Texas's 29th congressional district election
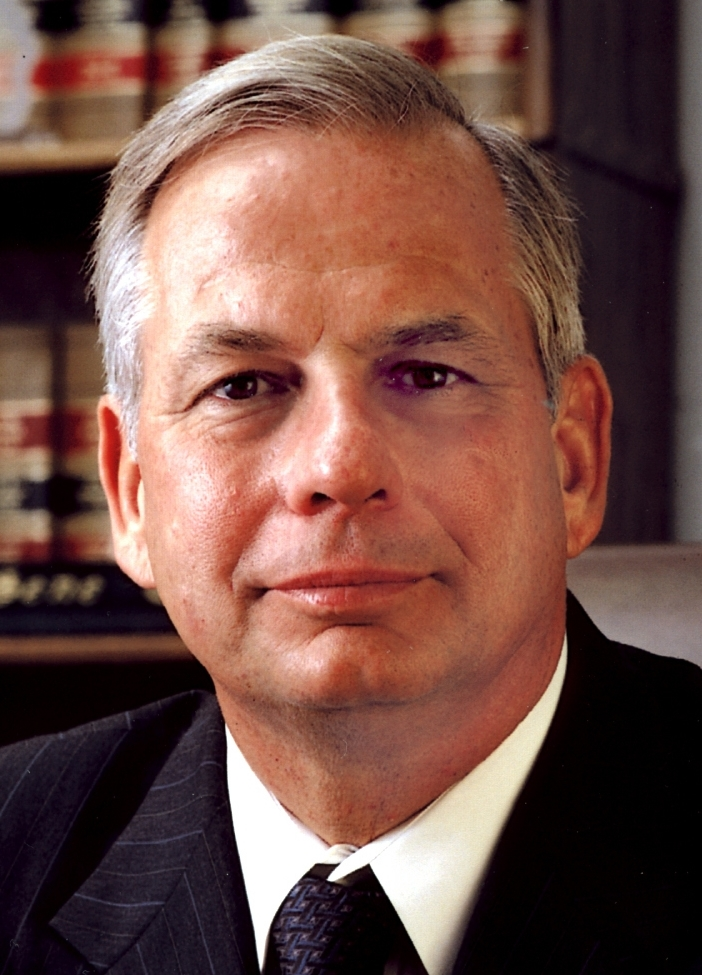

Nominee	Gene Green	James Stanczak
Party	Democratic	Libertarian
Popular vote	41,321	4,822
Percentage	79.6%	10.4%
- County results Green: 80–90%
U.S. Representative before election
Gene Green
Democratic
Elected U.S. Representative
Gene Green
Democratic

Incumbent Democrat, Gene Green, who had represented the district since 1993, ran for re-election. He was re-elected in 2012 with 90% of the vote, and the district had a PVI of D+12.

=== Democratic primary ===
==== Candidates ====
===== Nominee =====
- Gene Green, incumbent U.S. Representative

==== Results ====
Democratic primary results
Party	Candidate	Votes	%
Democratic	Gene Green (incumbent)	6,244	100.0

=== Libertarian primary ===
==== Candidates ====
===== Nominee =====
- James Stanczak, nominee for this seat in 2012

=== General election ===
==== Endorsements ====
Gene Green (D)

Labor unions

- AFL-CIO

==== Predictions ====
Source	Ranking	As of
The Cook Political Report	Safe D	November 3, 2014
Rothenberg	Safe D	October 24, 2014
Sabato's Crystal Ball	Safe D	October 30, 2014
RCP	Safe D	November 2, 2014
Daily Kos Elections	Safe D	November 4, 2014

==== Results ====
Texas's 29th congressional district, 2014
Party	Candidate	Votes	%
Democratic	Gene Green (incumbent)	41,321	79.6
Libertarian	James Stanczak	4,822	10.4
Total votes		46,143	100.0
Democratic hold			

== District 30 ==
2014 Texas's 30th congressional district election

Nominee	Eddie Bernice Johnson	Max W. Koch III	Eric LeMonte Williams
Party	Democratic	Libertarian	Independent
Popular vote	93,041	7,154	5,598
Percentage	87.9%	6.8%	5.3%
- County results Johnson: 80–90%
U.S. Representative before election
Eddie Bernice Johnson
Democratic
Elected U.S. Representative
Eddie Bernice Johnson
Democratic

Incumbent Democrat Eddie Bernice Johnson, who had represented the district since 1993, ran for re-election. She was re-elected in 2012 with 79% of the vote, and the district had a PVI of D+27.

=== Democratic primary ===
==== Candidates ====
===== Nominee =====
- Eddie Bernice Johnson, incumbent U.S. Representative

===== Eliminated in primary =====
- Barbara Mallory Caraway, state representative and candidate for this seat in 2012

==== Results ====
Democratic primary results
Party	Candidate	Votes	%
Democratic	Eddie Bernice Johnson (incumbent)	23,756	69.9
Democratic	Barbara Mallory Caraway	10,216	30.1
Total votes		33,972	100.0

=== Republican primary ===
No Republicans filed to run.

=== Libertarian primary ===
==== Candidates ====
===== Nominee =====
- Max Koch III, vice president of Arlington Cable

=== Independents ===
- Eric LeMonte Williams

=== General election ===
==== Endorsements ====
Eddie Bernice Johnson (D)

Labor unions

- AFL-CIO

==== Predictions ====
Source	Ranking	As of
The Cook Political Report	Safe D	November 3, 2014
Rothenberg	Safe D	October 24, 2014
Sabato's Crystal Ball	Safe D	October 30, 2014
RCP	Safe D	November 2, 2014
Daily Kos Elections	Safe D	November 4, 2014

==== Results ====
Texas's 30th congressional district, 2014
Party	Candidate	Votes	%
Democratic	Eddie Bernice Johnson (incumbent)	93,041	87.9
Libertarian	Max W. Koch III	7,154	6.8
Independent	Eric LeMonte Williams	5,598	5.3
Total votes		105,793.0	100
Democratic hold			

== District 31 ==
2014 Texas's 31st congressional district election
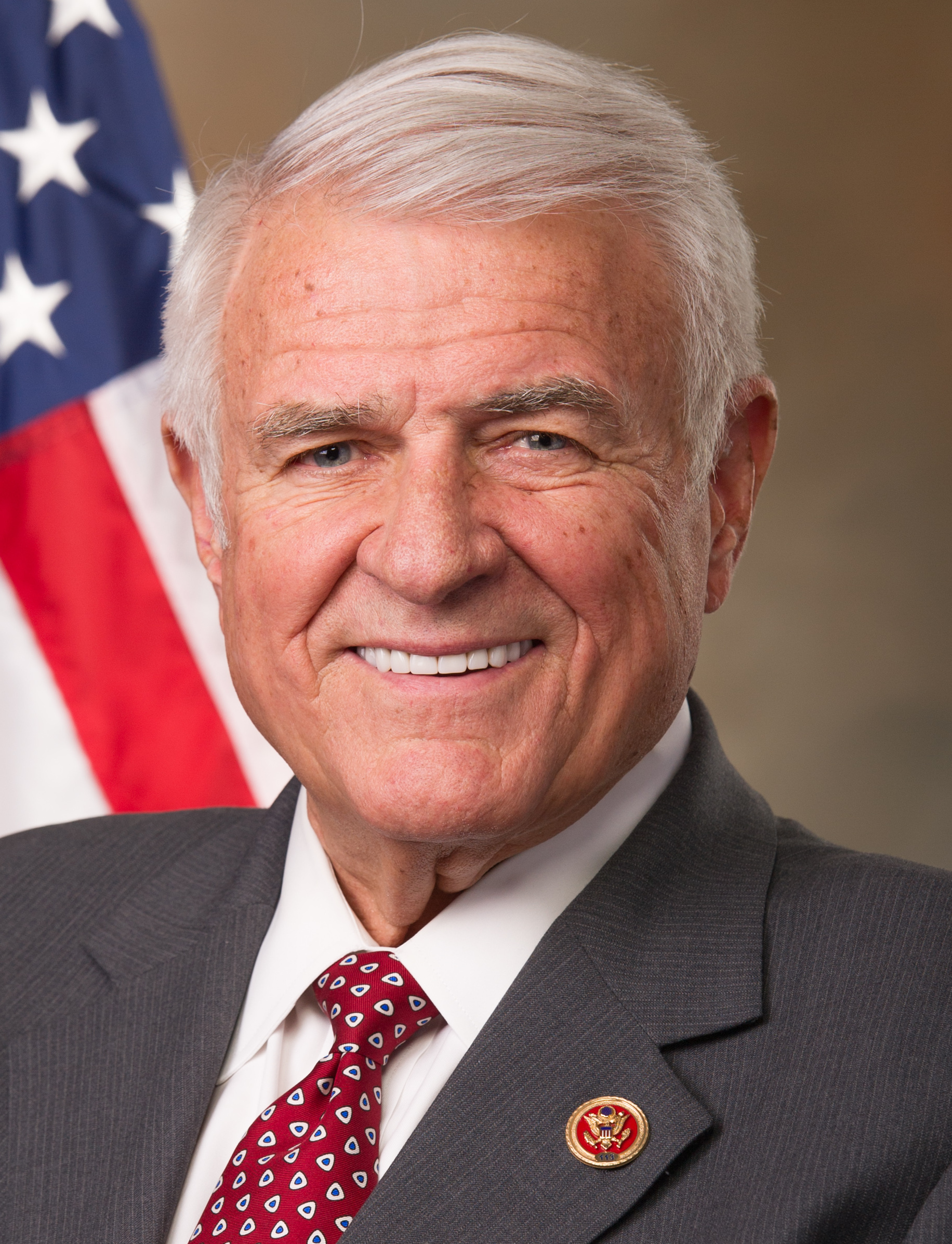

Nominee	John Carter	Louie Minor
Party	Republican	Democratic
Popular vote	91,607	45,715
Percentage	64.0%	32.0%
- County results Carter: 60–70%
U.S. Representative before election
John Carter
Republican
Elected U.S. Representative
John Carter
Republican

Incumbent Republican John Carter, who had represented the district since 2003, ran for re-election. He was re-elected in 2012 with 61% of the vote, and the district had a PVI of R+12.

=== Republican primary ===
==== Candidates ====
===== Nominee =====
- John Carter, incumbent U.S. Representative

==== Results ====
Republican primary results
Party	Candidate	Votes	%
Republican	John Carter (incumbent)	30,011	100.0

=== Democratic primary ===
==== Candidates ====
===== Nominee =====
- Louie Minor, Army reserve captain and Iraq War veteran

==== Results ====
Democratic primary results
Party	Candidate	Votes	%
Democratic	Louie Minor	8,036	100.0

=== Libertarian primary ===
==== Candidates ====
===== Nominee =====
- Scott Ballard, nominee for the 11th district in 2012

=== General election ===
==== Endorsements ====
Louie Minor (D)

Labor unions

- AFL-CIO

==== Predictions ====
Source	Ranking	As of
The Cook Political Report	Safe R	November 3, 2014
Rothenberg	Safe R	October 24, 2014
Sabato's Crystal Ball	Safe R	October 30, 2014
RCP	Safe R	November 2, 2014
Daily Kos Elections	Safe R	November 4, 2014

==== Results ====
Texas's 31st congressional district, 2014
Party	Candidate	Votes	%
Republican	John Carter (incumbent)	91,607	64.0
Democratic	Louie Minor	45,715	32.0
Libertarian	Scott J. Ballard	5,706	4.0
Total votes		143,028	100.0
Republican hold			

== District 32 ==
2014 Texas's 32nd congressional district election
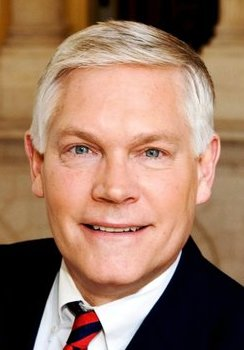

Nominee	Pete Sessions	Frank Perez
Party	Republican	Democratic
Popular vote	96,495	55,325
Percentage	61.8%	35.4%
- County results Sessions: 60–70%
U.S. Representative before election
Pete Sessions
Republican
Elected U.S. Representative
Pete Sessions
Republican

Incumbent Republican Pete Sessions, who had represented the district since 2003, and previously represented the 5th district from 1997 to 2003, ran for re-election. He was re-elected in 2012 with 58% of the vote, and the district had a PVI of R+10.

=== Republican primary ===
==== Candidates ====
===== Nominee =====
- Pete Sessions, incumbent U.S. Representative

===== Eliminated in primary =====
- Katrina Pierson, Tea Party activist

==== Results ====
Republican primary results
Party	Candidate	Votes	%
Republican	Pete Sessions (incumbent)	28,981	63.6
Republican	Katrina Pierson	16,574	36.4
Total votes		45,555	100.0

=== Democratic primary ===
==== Candidates ====
===== Nominee =====
- Frank Perez, attorney

==== Results ====
Democratic primary results
Party	Candidate	Votes	%
Democratic	Frank Perez	10,681	100.0

=== Libertarian primary ===
==== Candidates ====
===== Nominee =====
- Edward Rankin, executive coach

=== General election ===
==== Predictions ====
Source	Ranking	As of
The Cook Political Report	Safe R	November 3, 2014
Rothenberg	Safe R	October 24, 2014
Sabato's Crystal Ball	Safe R	October 30, 2014
RCP	Safe R	November 2, 2014
Daily Kos Elections	Safe R	November 4, 2014

==== Results ====
Texas's 32nd congressional district, 2014
Party	Candidate	Votes	%
Republican	Pete Sessions (incumbent)	96,495	61.8
Democratic	Frank Perez	55,325	35.4
Libertarian	Ed Rankin	4,276	2.8
Total votes		156,096	100.0
Republican hold			

== District 33 ==
2014 Texas's 33rd congressional district election
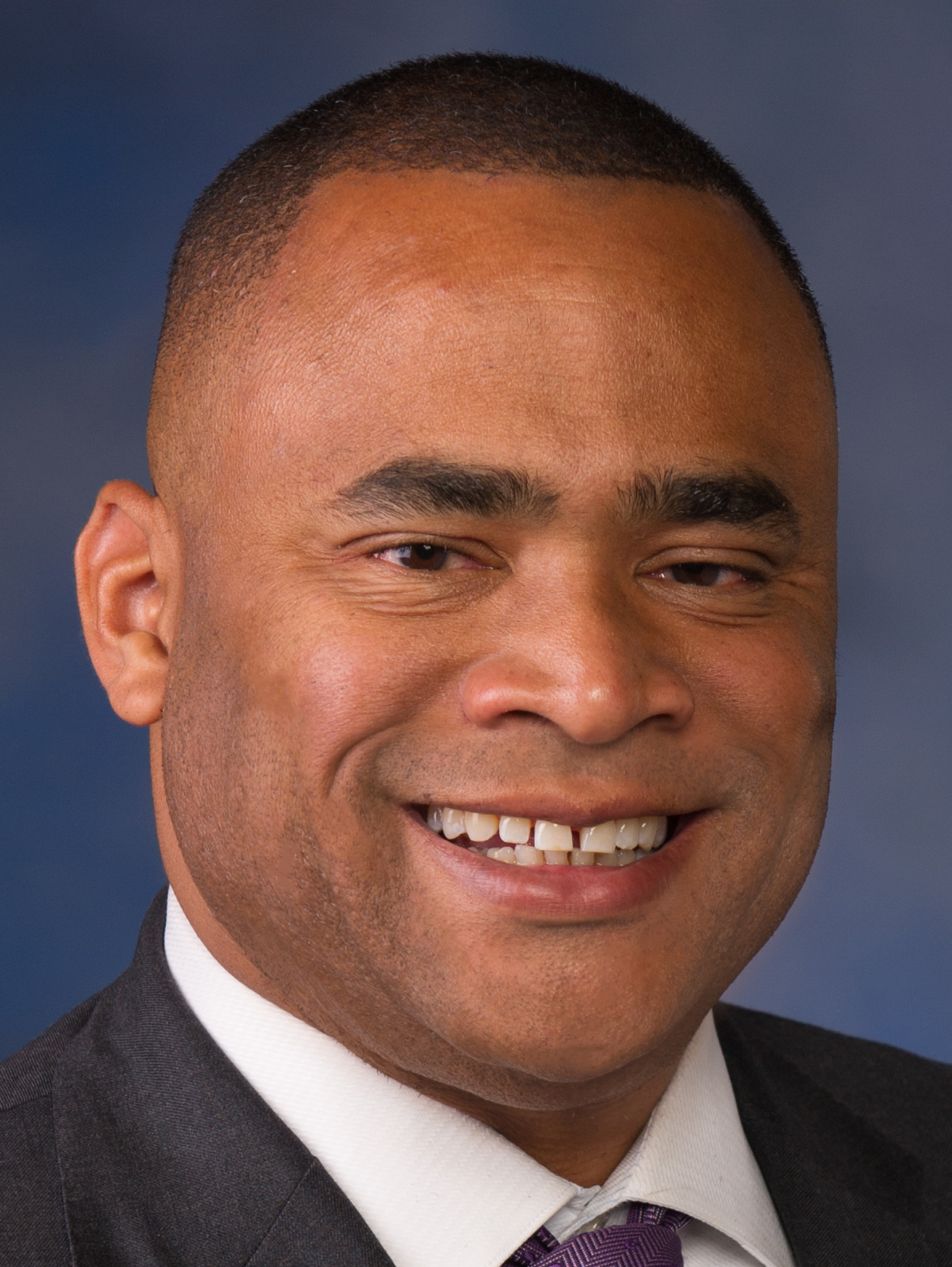

Nominee	Marc Veasey	Jason Reeves
Party	Democratic	Libertarian
Popular vote	43,769	6,823
Percentage	86.5%	13.5%
- County results Veasey: 80–90%
U.S. Representative before election
Marc Veasey
Democratic
Elected U.S. Representative
Marc Veasey
Democratic

Incumbent Democrat Marc Veasey, who had represented the district since 2013, ran for re-election. He was elected to the newly created district in 2012 with 73% of the vote. The district had a PVI of D+18.

=== Democratic primary ===
==== Candidates ====
===== Nominee =====
- Marc Veasey, incumbent U.S. Representative

===== Eliminated in primary =====
- Thomas Carl Sanchez, attorney

===== Declined =====
- Domingo García, former state representative and candidate for this seat in 2012

==== Results ====
Democratic primary results
Party	Candidate	Votes	%
Democratic	Marc Veasey (incumbent)	13,292	73.5
Democratic	Tom Sanchez	4,798	26.5
Total votes		18,090	100.0

=== Republican primary ===
No Republicans filed to run.

=== Libertarian primary ===
==== Candidates ====
===== Nominee =====
- Jason Reeves

=== General election ===
==== Endorsements ====
Marc Veasey (D)

Labor unions

- AFL-CIO

==== Predictions ====
Source	Ranking	As of
The Cook Political Report	Safe D	November 3, 2014
Rothenberg	Safe D	October 24, 2014
Sabato's Crystal Ball	Safe D	October 30, 2014
RCP	Safe D	November 2, 2014
Daily Kos Elections	Safe D	November 4, 2014

==== Results ====
Texas's 33rd congressional district, 2014
Party	Candidate	Votes	%
Democratic	Marc Veasey (incumbent)	43,769	86.5
Libertarian	Jason Reeves	6,823	13.5
Total votes		50,592	100.0
Democratic hold			

== District 34 ==
2014 Texas's 34th congressional district election
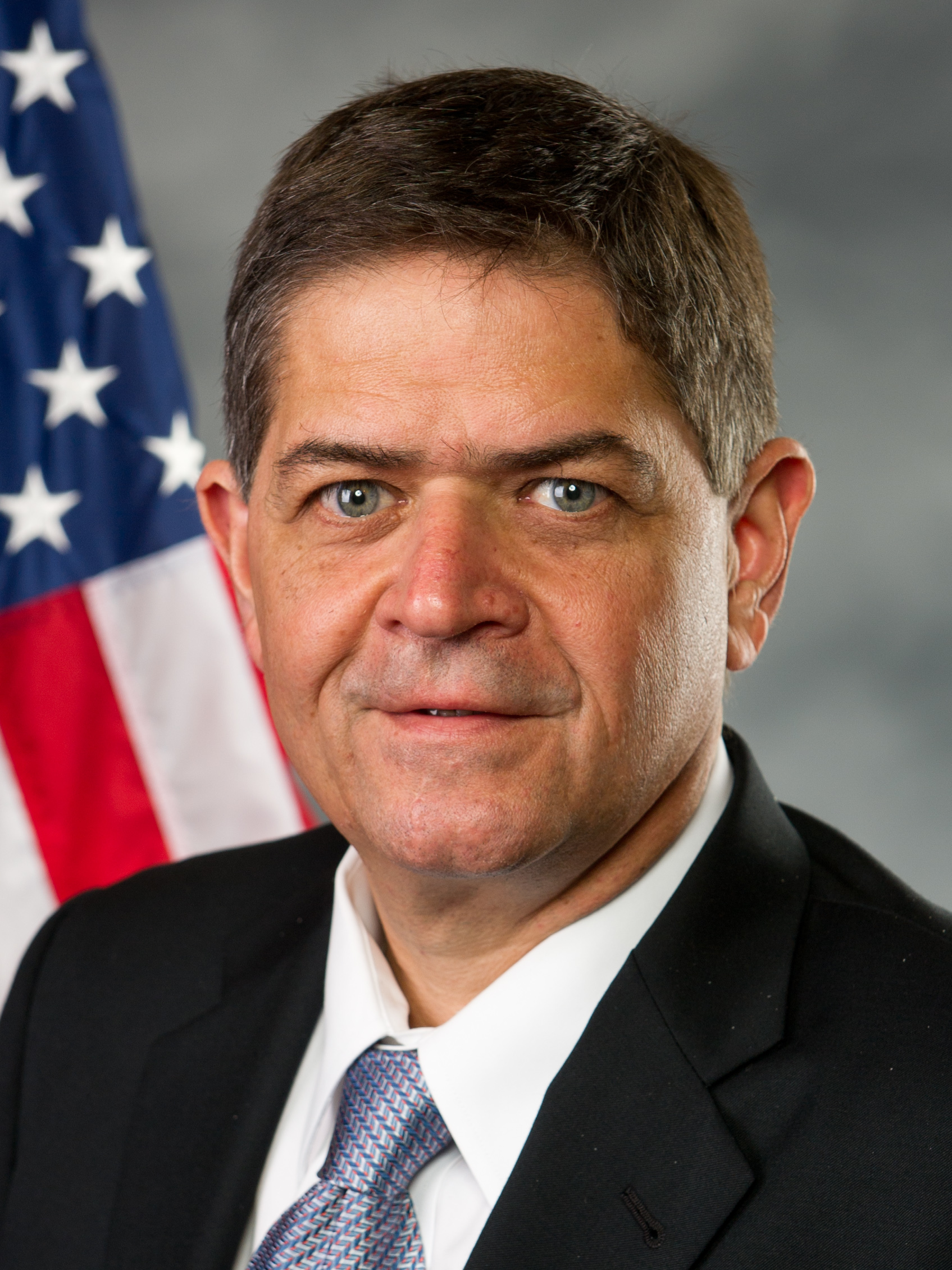

Nominee	Filemon Vela Jr.	Larry Smith
Party	Democratic	Republican
Popular vote	47,503	30,811
Percentage	59.5%	38.5%
- County results Vela: 50–60% 60–70% 70–80% Smith: 50–60% 60–70% 70–80% 80–90%
U.S. Representative before election
Filemon Vela Jr.
Democratic
Elected U.S. Representative
Filemon Vela Jr.
Democratic

Incumbent Democrat Filemon Vela Jr., who had represented the district since 2013, ran for re-election. He was elected to the newly created district in 2012 with 62% of the vote. The district had a PVI of D+8.

=== Democratic primary ===
==== Candidates ====
===== Nominee =====
- Filemon Vela Jr., incumbent U.S. Representative

==== Results ====
Democratic primary results
Party	Candidate	Votes	%
Democratic	Filemon Vela (incumbent)	26,237	100.0

=== Republican primary ===
==== Candidates ====
===== Nominee =====
- Larry Smith

==== Results ====
Republican primary results
Party	Candidate	Votes	%
Republican	Larry Smith	7,427	100.0

=== Libertarian primary ===
==== Candidates ====
===== Nominee =====
- Ryan Rowley, former U.S. Army Airborne infantryman

===== Eliminated in primary =====
- Doug Purl

=== General election ===
==== Predictions ====
Source	Ranking	As of
The Cook Political Report	Safe D	November 3, 2014
Rothenberg	Safe D	October 24, 2014
Sabato's Crystal Ball	Safe D	October 30, 2014
RCP	Safe D	November 2, 2014
Daily Kos Elections	Safe D	November 4, 2014

==== Results ====
Texas's 34th congressional district, 2014
Party	Candidate	Votes	%
Democratic	Filemon Vela Jr. (incumbent)	47,503	59.5
Republican	Larry Smith	30,811	38.5
Libertarian	Ryan Rowley	1,563	2.0
Total votes		79,877	100.0
Democratic hold			

== District 35 ==
2014 Texas's 35th congressional district election
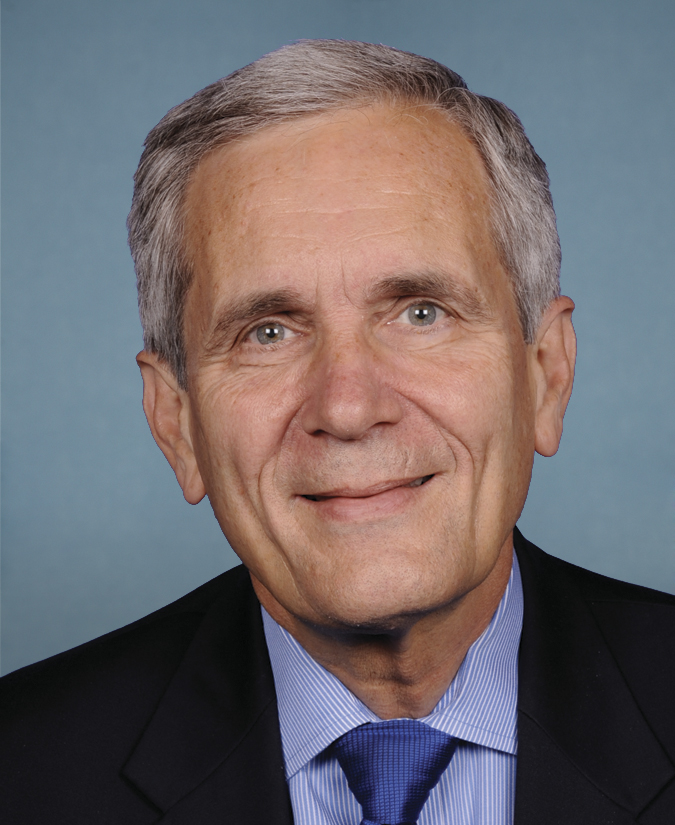

Nominee	Lloyd Doggett	Susan Narvaiz
Party	Democratic	Republican
Popular vote	60,124	32,040
Percentage	62.5%	33.3%
- County results Doggett: 50–60% 60–70% 70–80% Narvaiz: 60–70%
U.S. Representative before election
Lloyd Doggett
Democratic
Elected U.S. Representative
Lloyd Doggett
Democratic

Incumbent Democrat Lloyd Doggett, who had represented the district since 2013 and previously represented the 25th district from 2005 to 2013 and the 10th district from 1995 to 2005, ran for re-election. He was re-elected in 2012 with 64% of the vote, and the district had a PVI of D+11.

=== Democratic primary ===
==== Candidates ====
===== Nominee =====
- Lloyd Doggett, incumbent U.S. Representative

==== Results ====
Democratic primary results
Party	Candidate	Votes	%
Democratic	Lloyd Doggett (incumbent)	15,399	100.0

=== Republican primary ===
==== Candidates ====
===== Nominee =====
- Susan Narvaiz, former mayor of San Marcos and nominee for this seat in 2012

==== Results ====
Republican primary results
Party	Candidate	Votes	%
Republican	Susan Narvaiz	9,717	100.0

=== Libertarian primary ===
==== Candidates ====
===== Nominee =====
- Cory Bruner

=== Green primary ===
==== Candidates ====
===== Nominee =====
- Kat Swift

=== General election ===
==== Endorsements ====
Lloyd Doggett (D)

Labor unions

- AFL-CIO

==== Predictions ====
Source	Ranking	As of
The Cook Political Report	Safe D	November 3, 2014
Rothenberg	Safe D	October 24, 2014
Sabato's Crystal Ball	Safe D	October 30, 2014
RCP	Safe D	November 2, 2014
Daily Kos Elections	Safe D	November 4, 2014

==== Results ====
Texas's 35th congressional district, 2014
Party	Candidate	Votes	%
Democratic	Lloyd Doggett (incumbent)	60,124	62.5
Republican	Susan Narvaiz	32,040	33.3
Libertarian	Cory Bruner	2,767	2.9
Green	Kat Swift	1,294	1.3
Total votes		96,225	100.0
Democratic hold			

== District 36 ==
2014 Texas's 36th congressional district election
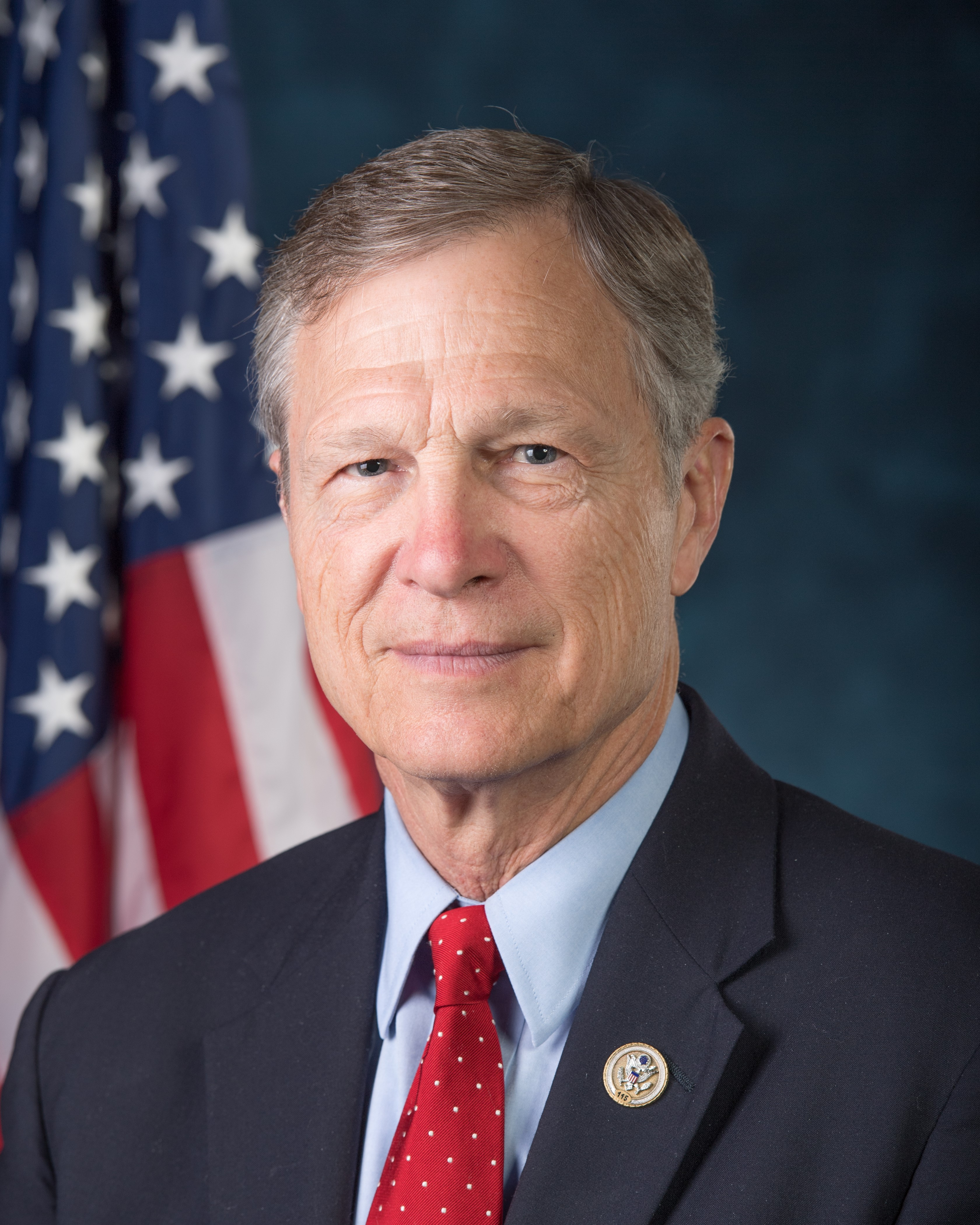

Nominee	Brian Babin	Ben Streusand
Party	Republican	Republican
Popular vote	19,301	14,069
Percentage	57.8%	42.2%
- County results Babin: 70–80% 80–90%
U.S. Representative before election
Steve Stockman
Republican
Elected U.S. Representative
Brian Babin
Republican

Incumbent Republican Steve Stockman, who had represented the district since 2013 and previously represented the 9th district from 1995 to 1997, chose to challenge John Cornyn for the United States Senate, rather than run for re-election. He was elected to the newly created district in 2012 with 71% of the vote. The district had a PVI of R+25.

=== Republican primary ===
==== Candidates ====
===== Nominee =====
- Brian Babin, dentist, former mayor of Woodville and nominee for the 2nd district in 1996 and 1998

===== Eliminated in primary =====
- John Amdur, attorney and Nassau Bay city councillor
- Doug Centilli, former Chief of Staff to U.S. Representative Kevin Brady
- Jim Engstrand, businessman, retired Army colonel and candidate for this seat in 2012
- Phil Fitzgerald, construction business owner and former Liberty County judge
- Pat Kasprzak, high school teacher and former banker
- John Manlove, businessman, former mayor of Pasadena and candidate for the 22nd district in 2008
- Chuck Meyer, lawyer, candidate for this seat in 2012 and Independent candidate for 18th district in 2010
- Kim Morrell, former Seabrook city councillor and candidate for this seat in 2012
- Dave Norman, insurance agent, nominee for the State House in 1996 and 1998 and candidate for the state senate in 2012
- Robin Riley, oil and gas executive, former NASA contractor and former mayor of Seabrook
- Ben Streusand, mortgage banker and candidate for the 10th district in 2004

==== Results ====
Republican primary results
Party	Candidate	Votes	%
Republican	Brian Babin	17,194	33.4
Republican	Ben Streusand	12,024	23.3
Republican	John Manlove	3,556	6.9
Republican	Doug Centilli	3,506	6.8
Republican	Phil Fitzgerald	3,388	6.6
Republican	Robin Riley	2,648	5.1
Republican	Dave Norman	2,325	4.5
Republican	Chuck Meyer	1,574	3.0
Republican	John Amdur	1,470	2.9
Republican	Kim Morrell	1,444	2.8
Republican	Jim Engstrand	1,288	2.5
Republican	Pat Kasprzak	1,116	2.2
Total votes		51,533	100.0

==== Runoff ====
===== Results =====
Republican primary runoff results
Party	Candidate	Votes	%
Republican	Brian Babin	19,301	57.8
Republican	Ben Streusand	14,069	42.2
Total votes		33,370	100.0

=== Democratic primary ===
==== Candidates ====
===== Nominee =====
- Michael K. Cole, educator and Libertarian nominee for this seat in 2012

==== Results ====
Democratic primary results
Party	Candidate	Votes	%
Democratic	Michael K. Cole	6,507	100.0

=== Libertarian primary ===
==== Candidates ====
===== Nominee =====
- Rodney Veach

===== Eliminated in primary =====
- Robb Rourke

=== Green primary ===
==== Candidates ====
===== Nominee =====
- Hal J. Ridley Jr.

=== General election ===
==== Endorsements ====
Michael Cole (D)

Labor unions

- AFL-CIO

==== Predictions ====
Source	Ranking	As of
The Cook Political Report	Safe R	November 3, 2014
Rothenberg	Safe R	October 24, 2014
Sabato's Crystal Ball	Safe R	October 30, 2014
RCP	Safe R	November 2, 2014
Daily Kos Elections	Safe R	November 4, 2014

==== Results ====
Texas's 36th congressional district, 2014
Party	Candidate	Votes	%
Republican	Brian Babin	101,663	75.9
Democratic	Michael Cole	29,543	22.1
Libertarian	Rodney Veach	1,951	1.5
Green	Hal J. Ridley Jr.	685	0.5
Total votes		133,842	100.0
Republican hold			

== See also ==
- 2014 United States House of Representatives elections
- 2014 United States elections
