= John McDonald =

John McDonald may refer to:

== Politics ==
=== Australian ===
- John McDonald (Western Australian politician) (1869–1934), member of the Western Australian Legislative Assembly, 1911–1914
- John McDonald (Victorian politician) (1898–1977), Premier of the state of Victoria, Australia, 1950–1952
- John Joseph McDonald (1904–1959), Australian Labor Party Member of the Tasmania House of Assembly
- John Young McDonald (1837–1917), member of the Victorian Legislative Council

=== Canadian ===
- John McDonald (1787–1860), businessman and political figure in Upper Canada and Canada West
- John Anthony McDonald (1875–1948), manufacturer, financier and Canadian senator
- John Alexander McDonald (politician) (1889–1962), farmer and political figure in Nova Scotia, Canada
- John Archibald McDonald (Nova Scotia politician) (1851–1925), lawyer and political figure in Nova Scotia, Canada
- John Archibald McDonald (Saskatchewan politician) (1865–1929), banker and political figure in Saskatchewan, Canada
- John Lawrence McDonald (1894–1969), Ontario farmer and political figure, represented Stormont in the Legislative Assembly of Ontario, 1943–1951
- John Stevenson McDonald (1828–1917), Scottish-born Ontario farmer and political figure, represented Bruce Centre in the Legislative Assembly of Ontario, 1894–1898
- John W. McDonald (1878–1950), leader of the Alberta Liberal Party

=== New Zealand ===
- John McDonald (mayor), mayor of Dunedin, New Zealand, 1908–1909

=== United States ===
- John McDonald (Illinois politician), 19th century Illinois state representative
- John McDonald (Illinois state representative, Jo Daviess county), 19th century Illinois state representative
- John McDonald (Maine politician) (1773–1826), state senator
- John McDonald (Maryland politician) (1837–1917), U.S. representative from Maryland
- John McDonald (Ohio politician), former member of the Ohio House of Representatives
- John D. McDonald (politician) (1816–1900), Wisconsin state assemblyman
- John C. McDonald (1930–2011), Louisiana State University chancellor
- John S. McDonald (1864–1941), justice of the Michigan Supreme Court
- John T. McDonald III (born 1962), member of the New York State Assembly
- John Warlick McDonald (1922–2019), U.S. ambassador
- John Angus McDonald (1917–2008), member of the Florida Senate

== Sportsmen ==
- Jock McDonald (fl. 1920s), Scottish footballer for Airdrieonians and Everton
- John McDonald (archer) (born 1965), Canadian archer
- John McDonald (infielder) (born 1974), Major League Baseball infielder
- John McDonald (pitcher) (1883–1950), Major League Baseball pitcher for the Washington Senators in 1907
- John McDonald (bobsleigh), American bobsledder who competed in the late 1940s
- John McDonald (rugby league) (1944–2023), Australian rugby league footballer, coach and administrator
- John McDonald (English cricketer) (1882–1961), English cricketer
- John McDonald (New Zealand cricketer) (born 1931), New Zealand cricketer
- John McDonald (ice hockey) (1921–1990), professional ice hockey player
- John McDonald (footballer, born 1921) (1921–1999), football player for Tranmere Rovers

== Media, arts, and entertainment ==
- John McDonald (art critic) (born 1961), Australian art critic, mainly for The Sydney Morning Herald
- John McDonald (commentator), British sports commentator
- John McDonald (journalist) (1906–1998), American journalist and writer
- John McDonald (poet) (1846–?), poet from County Leitrim in Ireland
- John P. McDonald (1922–1993), American librarian
- John R. McDonald, Canadian historian and writer

== Military ==
- John McDonald (Union army general) (1832–1912)
- John Bacon McDonald (1859–1927), United States Army officer
- John Wade McDonald, American Civil War soldier and Medal of Honor recipient on List of American Civil War Medal of Honor recipients: M–P

== Other people ==
- John McDonald (entrepreneur), restaurateur and entrepreneur based in New York City
- John B. McDonald, American construction businessman
- John Randal McDonald (1922–2003), architect who worked in the 1950s and 1960s
- W. John McDonald, Canadian physicist and academic administrator
- John McDonald (architect) (1861–1956), Canadian-American architect

== See also ==
- John Macdonald (disambiguation)
- John Macdonell (disambiguation)
- Jack McDonald (disambiguation)
- John McDonnell (disambiguation)
- Jackie McDonald (born 1947), Ulster Defence Association brigadier for South Belfast
- Jon-Marc McDonald (born 1976), American political activist
