= John McDonnell (disambiguation) =

John McDonnell (born 1951) is a British Labour Party politician who has been the member of parliament for Hayes and Harlington since 1997.

John McDonnell and variations may also refer to:

== Politicians ==
- John Macdonell of Greenfield (1785–1812), Canadian lawyer and politician, aide-de-camp to Isaac Brock
- "Spanish" John MacDonell (Revolutionary War loyalist) (1728–1810), United Empire Loyalist and early Canadian settler
- John MacDonell (political strategist), past president of the Nova Scotia Progressive Conservative Party in Canada
- John MacDonell (Nova Scotia politician) (born 1956), NDP MLA in Nova Scotia
- John McDonell (American politician) (1780–1846), member of the Michigan Senate in the first years of Michigan's statehood
- John McDonell (Le Prêtre) or Macdonell (1768–1850), known as Le Prêtre, political figure in Upper Canada
- John McDonell (Upper Canada politician, died 1809) (c. 1758–1809), soldier, judge, and political figure in Upper Canada
- John Alexander MacDonell (1854–1912), Canadian politician

== Sports ==
- John McDonell (rugby league), Australian rugby league footballer
- John McDonnell (coach) (1938–2021), track coach for the Arkansas Razorbacks
- John McDonnell (footballer) (born 1965), former Irish footballer and football manager
- Johnny McDonnell (1885–?), Irish footballer
- Johnny McDonnell (Gaelic footballer), player for Dublin

== Arts and entertainment ==
- John Macdonell, American radio producer and host, see WUWF
- John McDonnell (playwright), Irish playwright and journalist
- John McDonnell (producer), Irish film producer

== Others ==
- John Macdonnell (1821–1902), Irish dean of Cashel
- Sir John Macdonell (judge), (1846–1921), English editor of State trials
- John MacDonell (British Army officer) (1899–1944), British colonel
- John F. McDonnell (born 1938), chairman and CEO at McDonnell Douglas and Boeing
- John McDonnell (trade unionist) (born 1943), former Irish trade union leader
- John MacDonnell (surgeon) (1796–1892), Irish surgeon

== Other uses ==
- USNS John McDonnell, a hydrographic survey ship
