= John Macdonald =

John Macdonald or MacDonald may refer to:

== Government ==
=== Australia ===
- John MacDonald (Australian politician) (1880–1937), Australian senator for Queensland

=== Britain ===
- John Mor MacDonald, 3rd of Dunnyveg (fl. 1499), third lord of Clan Donald
- John MacDonald II or John of Islay, Earl of Ross (1434–1503), last Lord of the Isles, Scotland
- John Macdonald, Lord Kingsburgh (1836–1919), Scottish politician and later a judge
- John Macdonald (British politician, born 1854) (1854–1939), British Liberal politician

=== Canada ===
- John Small MacDonald (c. 1791–1849), Prince Edward Island merchant and politician
- John Sandfield Macdonald (1812–1872), first premier of Ontario
- John A. Macdonald (1815–1891), first Canadian prime minister
- John Macdonald (Canadian politician) (1824–1890), member of parliament and later senator
- John MacDonald of Glenaladale (1742–1810), Scottish born soldier and Prince Edward Island landowner
- John Alexander MacDonald (Prince Edward Island politician) (1838–1905), speaker of the Prince Edward Island assembly
- John Alexander Macdonald (Prince Edward Island politician) (1874–1948), member of parliament for King's, Prince Edward Island
- John Alexander Macdonald (Nova Scotia politician) (1883–1945), politician in Nova Scotia
- John Alexander MacDonald (Nova Scotia politician) (died 1938), member of the Nova Scotia House of Assembly
- John Joseph MacDonald (1891–1986), senator for Prince Edward Island
- John Michael Macdonald (1906–1997), senator for Nova Scotia
- John Augustine Macdonald (1913–1961), member of parliament for King's, Prince Edward Island
- John W. MacDonald (1900–1983), Canadian politician in the Nova Scotia House of Assembly
- John A. MacDonald (Nova Scotia politician) (born 1979), politician in Nova Scotia
- John Welsford Macdonald (1890–1976), barrister, judge, and member of the Nova Scotia House of Assembly

=== United States ===
- John MacDonald (New Hampshire politician), member of the New Hampshire House of Representatives
- John L. MacDonald (1838–1903), American representative from Minnesota
- John R. MacDonald (1857–1946), Michigan politician

== Literature ==
- John D. MacDonald (1916–1986), American mystery author
- John McDonald, pseudonym of Kenneth Miller (1915–1983), Canadian-American mystery author, better known as Ross Macdonald

== Military ==
- John MacDonald of Garth (1771–1866), Scottish-Canadian participant in the Pemmican war
- John Macdonald (British Army officer, died 1850) (bef. 1795–1850), Adjutant-General to the Forces
- John Macdonald (British Army officer, born 1907) (1907–1979)
- John MacDonald (British Army officer, born 1938) (1938–2026)
- John Macdonald (Australian Army officer) (1919–1996), University of New South Wales Regiment
- John Denis Macdonald (1826–1908), English naval surgeon and naturalist

== Music ==
- John-Angus MacDonald (active since 1997), Canadian musician and guitarist
- John Scantlebury Macdonald, real name of Harry Macdonough (1871–1931), Canadian singer and music recording pioneer
- John MacDonald of Inverness (1865–1953), Scottish bagpiper

== Religion ==
- John MacDonald (bishop of Aberdeen) (1818–1889), Scottish Roman Catholic bishop
- John Macdonald (Apostle of the North) (1779–1849), Scottish minister of the Free Church of Scotland, known as the "Apostle of the North"
- John MacDonald (Rosskeen) (1860–1947), Free Church of Scotland minister
- John MacDonald (vicar apostolic of the Highland District) (1727–1779), Scottish Roman Catholic bishop
- John Hugh MacDonald (1881–1965), Canadian Roman Catholic prelate, Archbishop of Edmonton
- John Roderick MacDonald (1891–1959), Canadian Roman Catholic prelate, bishop of Peterborough, Ontario

== Sports ==
- John Macdonald (sportsman) (1861–1938), represented Scotland at both cricket and football
- John MacDonald (American football) (1885–1962), American football head coach for Boston University
- John MacDonald (canoeist) (born 1965), New Zealand Olympic canoer
- John MacDonald (footballer, born 1883) (1883–1915), Scottish footballer for Blackburn Rovers, Leeds City, Grimsby Town
- John Macdonald (footballer, born 1886) (1886–1960), Scottish footballer for Raith Rovers, Rangers, Liverpool, Newcastle United
- John MacDonald (footballer, born 1961), Scottish footballer for Rangers, Barnsley
- John MacDonald (ice hockey), Canadian ice hockey player who played for Destil Trappers in the Netherlands
- John MacDonald (racing driver) (1936–2026), race car driver and motorcycle racer of Hong Kong
- Jack Macdonald (sportsman) (1907–1982), New Zealand Olympic rower
- John Macdonald (Canadian football) (born 1978), Canadian football defensive linemen
- John MacDonald (rugby union, born 1960), Irish rugby union international player
- John MacDonald (rugby union, born 1890) (1890–1980), Scottish rugby union player
- John MacDonald (British Army officer, born 1938) (1938–2026), Scottish rugby union player

== Other people ==
- John Cathanach MacDonald, 4th of Dunnyveg (died 1499)
- John Macdonald (psychiatrist) (1920–2007), New Zealand forensic psychiatrist who coined the MacDonald triad of sociopathy
- John S. MacDonald (1936–2019), co-founder of MacDonald Dettwiler
- John Smyth Macdonald (1867–1941), British physiologist
- John Graham MacDonald (1834–1918), explorer and pioneer in Queensland, Australia
- John B. Macdonald (1918–2014), president of the University of British Columbia

== Other uses ==
- CCGS John A. Macdonald, a Canadian Coast Guard icebreaker

== See also ==
- John McDonald (disambiguation)
- Jack MacDonald (disambiguation)
- John Alexander Macdonald Armstrong (1877–1926), politician, conveyancer and real estate agent in Ontario
