= Brian Babin =

American dentist and politician (born 1948)

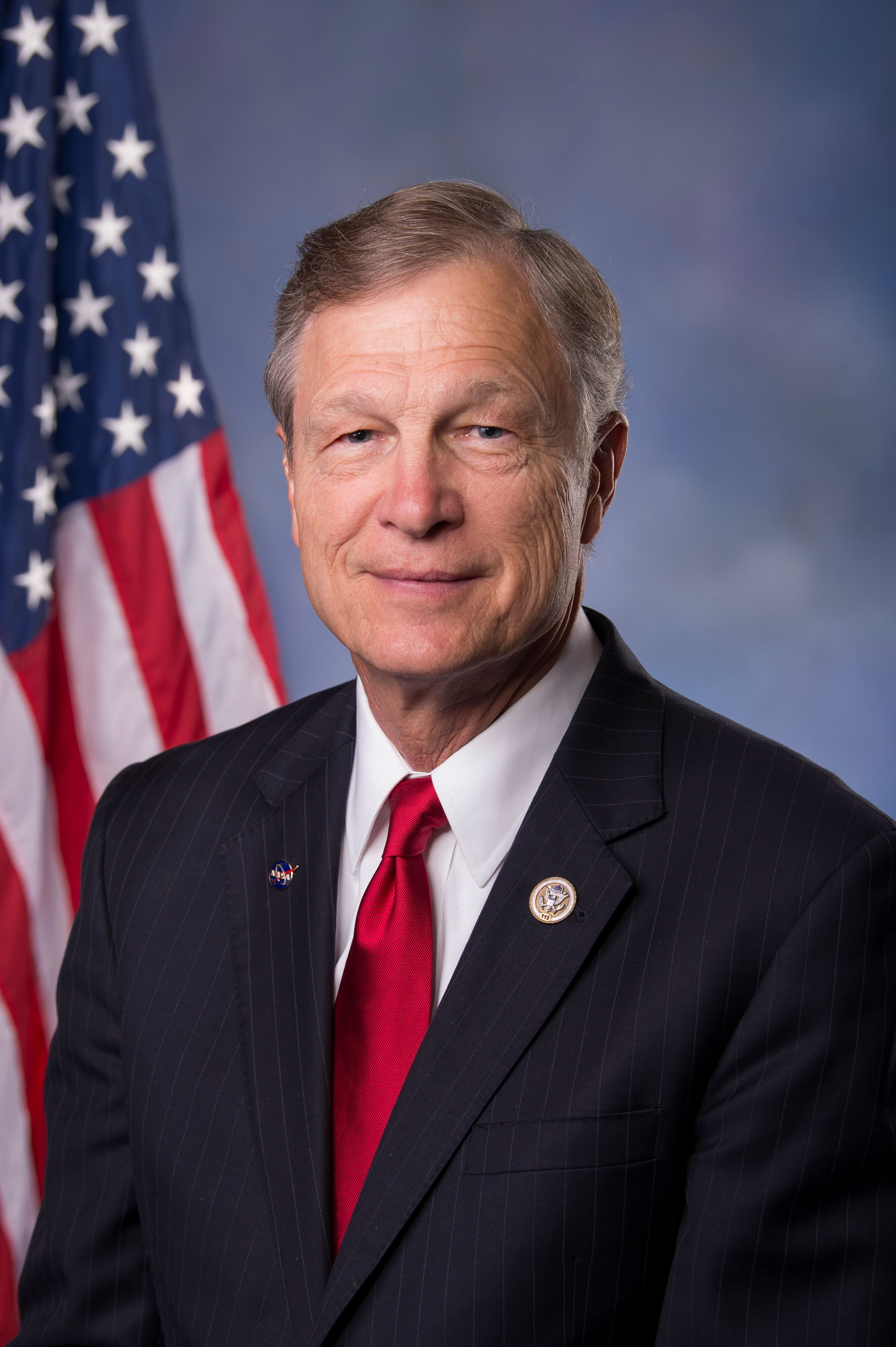

Chair of the House Science Committee
- Incumbent
- Assumed office January 3, 2025
- Preceded by: Frank Lucas

Member of the U.S. House of Representatives from Texas's 36th district
- Incumbent
- Assumed office January 3, 2015
- Preceded by: Steve Stockman

Personal details
- Born: Brian Philip Babin; March 23, 1948 (age 78) Port Arthur, Texas, U.S.
- Party: Republican
- Spouse: Roxanne Babin (m. 1972)
- Children: 5, including Lucas
- Education: Lamar University (BS); University of Texas, Houston (DDS)
- Website: House website Campaign website

Military service
- Branch/service: United States Air Force
- Years of service: 1975–1979
- Babin's voice Babin supporting a balanced budget amendment to the Constitution. Recorded April 12, 2018

Brian Philip Babin (/ˈbæbɪn/ BAB-in; born March 23, 1948) is an American dentist, politician and member of the Republican Party who has served as the U.S. representative from Texas's 36th congressional district since 2015. The district includes much of southeastern Houston, some of its eastern suburbs, and some more exurban and rural areas to the east.

A graduate of Lamar University and the University of Texas Dental Branch, Babin served in the United States Air Force from 1975 to 1979. He then opened a dental practice in Woodville, south of Lufkin, and became involved in Republican politics. He worked for various state and federal campaigns and held numerous local and regional government positions, including president of the Texas State Board of Dental Examiners (1981–1987), on the Deep East Texas Council of Governments (1982–1984), mayor of Woodville (1982–1984), on the Woodville City Council (1984–1989), on the Texas Historical Commission (1989–1995), chairman of the Tyler County Republican Party (1990–1995), on the Woodville Independent School District Board (1992–1995) and on the Lower Neches Valley Authority (1999–2015).

Babin was the Republican nominee for Texas's 2nd congressional district in 1996 and 1998, losing to Democrat Jim Turner both times. He ran again in 2014 to succeed Steve Stockman, who ran unsuccessfully for the U.S. Senate, and was elected to succeed him.

== Early and personal life ==
Babin graduated from Lamar University in 1973 and served as an officer in the United States Air Force from 1975 to 1979, leaving with the rank of captain. While serving, he earned a B.S. in biology from Lamar University in 1975 and then enrolled in the University of Texas Dental Branch and graduated with his D.D.S. in 1976. To pay for his tuition, he worked as a janitor, merchant seaman and postman and sang folk and country music in local restaurants with his wife Roxanne, whom he met in college.

Babin and his wife have been married since 1972 and have five children: Marit, an attorney and former press staffer at the National Republican Congressional Committee; Leif, a former Navy SEAL; twins Kirsten, an educator, and Lucas, a district attorney and former model and actor; and Laura. He is also the father-in-law of journalist and former Fox News Channel anchor Jenna Lee, who is married to Leif. Babin and his wife are members of the First Baptist Church of Woodville, where he is a deacon, Sunday school teacher, choir member, and member of Gideons International.

== Career ==
Babin has been engaged in general dental practice in Woodville, south of Lufkin, since 1979. He first entered politics in 1980, saying that when stationed overseas he felt "demoralized" by President Jimmy Carter. He thus worked for Ronald Reagan's campaign for president, first as county coordinator and then regional coordinator. He became active in the GOP when it barely existed in then heavily Democratic Deep East Texas, and is considered "instrumental" in turning the region Republican over the years. He also worked at the county, regional and state level for Reagan's reelection campaign, George H. W. Bush's presidential campaign, and Bill Clements's and George W. Bush's campaigns for governor of Texas.

Babin has served as mayor of Woodville (1982–1984), a Woodville city councilman (1984–1989), chair of the Tyler County Republican Party (1990–1995), a member of the Woodville Independent School District Board (1992–1995) and director of the Tyler County Chamber of Commerce. He has also served as president of the Texas State Board of Dental Examiners (1981–1987), on the Deep East Texas Council of Governments (1982–1984) and on the Texas Historical Commission (1989–1995). In 1999, Governor Bush appointed Babin to the Lower Neches Valley Authority, and Governor Rick Perry reappointed him, most recently in 2013, for a term that was to expire in 2019. He resigned before being sworn into Congress.

== U.S. House of Representatives ==
=== Elections ===
==== 1996 ====
When 12-term representative Charlie Wilson of Texas's 2nd congressional district decided to retire in 1996, Babin ran to succeed him. In the Republican primary, he was second of five candidates, with 7,094 votes (31.01%), behind Donna Peterson, the nominee for the seat in 1990, 1992 and 1994, who took 8,047 votes (35.18%). As no candidate secured a majority, Babin faced Peterson in a runoff, and defeated her, 7,405 votes (66.83%) to 3,675 (33.16%). In the general election, he lost to Democrat Jim Turner, a State Senator and former State Representative, 102,908 votes (52.24%) to 89,838 (45.6%).

After the 1996 election, Babin became involved in a campaign finance scandal concerning $37,000 in illegal donations from businessman Peter Cloeren that were moved through "vehicles" to circumvent the individual contribution limit of $1,000. Cloeren asserted in an affidavit that Babin and then-House majority whip Tom DeLay laundered his donations through other candidates and organisations. Babin and DeLay denied his allegations. Cloeren pleaded guilty to campaign finance violations, paid a $400,000 fine and received a two-year suspended prison sentence. Babin paid a $20,000 civil penalty and paid back $5,000 in excessive contributions for "accepting an excessive contribution and a contribution in the name of another and failing to disclose financial activity properly."

==== 1998 ====
Babin sought a rematch with Turner in 1998. Unopposed in the Republican primary, he again lost the general election, 81,556 votes (58.42%) to 56,891 (40.75%).

During the campaign, Babin's campaign manager was 21-year-old Jon-Marc McDonald. McDonald gained national attention when he simultaneously came out of the closet as a gay man and resigned as campaign manager. In August 1998, McDonald abruptly stepped down, citing "irreconcilable differences" with Babin over homosexuality. According to The Dallas Morning News, McDonald announced his resignation via press release without discussing it with Babin, and his sudden departure left those in the campaign shocked and confused.

McDonald generated further press coverage when he said in an interview after his resignation that Babin had made disparaging remarks about homosexuals in private, which Babin adamantly denied. In some press reports, Babin claimed that McDonald was not the campaign manager, but instead a "volunteer coordinator", also a paid position. An article by Hastings Wyman of the Southern Political Report suggested that McDonald was forced to resign by the local media threatening to "out" him. The resignation received widespread national media attention because of the sensationalistic way it transpired.

==== 2014 ====
After Representative Steve Stockman of Texas's 36th congressional district made a late decision to run for the U.S. Senate instead of for reelection, Babin ran to succeed him. In the 12-candidate Republican primary—the real contest in this heavily Republican district—Babin finished first with 17,194 votes (33.36%). As he did not receive a majority, he proceeded to a runoff with the second-place candidate, mortgage banker and candidate for Texas's 10th congressional district in 2004 Ben Streusand, who had received 12,024 votes (23.33%). In the runoff, Babin defeated Streusand, 19,301 votes (57.84%) to 14,069 (42.16%). He then faced Democrat Michael Cole in the general election, defeating him 100,933 votes (75.97%) to 29,291 (22.04%).

==== 2016 ====
On November 27, 2015, Babin announced that he would run for reelection in 2016. 2014 U.S. Senate candidate Dwayne Stovall, a bridge construction contractor, school board member from Cleveland and candidate for the State House of Representatives in 2012, announced in July 2015 that he would challenge Babin for the Republican nomination, but suspended his campaign in December 2015, citing poor fundraising and the difficulties of challenging an incumbent. Babin was thus unopposed in the March 1 Republican primary. The Democrats did not field a challenger in the general election; his only opposition came from Green Party candidate Hal Ridley Jr., who also ran in 2014.

=== Tenure ===
On January 6, 2015, Babin was one of 25 House Republicans to vote against John Boehner's reelection as Speaker of the United States House of Representatives. Boehner, who needed 205 votes, was reelected with 216. 24 Republicans voted for another candidate and Babin voted "present", effectively abstaining. Two days later, Babin explained his vote. He said that he didn't want to vote for Boehner to reflect dissatisfaction with him in his district, particularly over the Cromnibus. But he declined to vote for another candidate because "he would have preferred to see Boehner denied reelection on the first ballot, forcing a closed-door GOP caucus meeting at which a replacement might emerge."

On January 25, in an interview with The Daily Caller, Babin said that President Barack Obama "deserves impeachment", but he doubted that Congress would act on that. He also criticised Obama's foreign policy, calling him an "appeaser deluxe".

In June 2015, after the Supreme Court of the United States ruled in King v. Burwell that the tax subsidies in the Patient Protection and Affordable Care Act (commonly known as Obamacare) were constitutional, Babin introduced the "SCOTUScare Act". His bill would force the Supreme Court Justices to enroll in Obamacare and purchase health insurance under the health exchanges, so that they could, as he said, "understand the full impact of their decisions on the American people [and] see firsthand what the American people are forced to live with!" The name of Babin's bill references Justice Antonin Scalia's dissent, where he said that, after the Court had upheld the law twice, "we should start calling this law SCOTUScare."

In July 2015, Babin endorsed Senator Ted Cruz for president. He praised Cruz's "conservative leadership and fortitude" and said that he "will speak honestly to the American people".

In September 2015, in response to the Syrian refugee crisis, Babin introduced the Resettlement Accountability National Security Act, designed to oppose Obama's plan to expand the country's refugee program. The bill calls for a "temporary halt to the refugee program until the general accounting office can do an assessment of just exactly how much this is costing the taxpayer." Babin said that this was urgently necessary because the refugee program amounted to an "open invitation" to the "problems of the Middle East, of terrorism, oppression of women and all the things that go along with it." He also claimed that over 90% of refugees "are already on some sort of entitlement program when they come in" and that American cities could end up with "no-go zones", claiming that such places already existed in London, Liverpool, Paris, Amsterdam and Copenhagen.

On October 9, 2015, Babin chaired a hearing of the House Space Committee attended by various NASA executives. He criticised the Obama administration for cutting the NASA budget, saying that they would have a negative effect on the agency's space exploration programs and that budget uncertainty would impair efficiency. Babin also noted that the recent discovery of liquid water on Mars and the release of the Ridley Scott film The Martian had "garnered the public's attention, and rightly so" which would prompt the public to ask when there would be a human mission to Mars.

In 2015, Babin cosponsored a resolution to amend the Constitution to ban same-sex marriage. Babin also cosponsored a resolution disagreeing with the Supreme Court ruling in Obergefell v. Hodges, which held that same-sex marriage bans violated the constitution.

On October 20, 2016, Babin defended comments by Republican presidential nominee Donald Trump calling Hillary Clinton "a nasty woman" at the final presidential debate, saying "sometimes a lady needs to be told when she's being nasty."

In June 2017, Babin asked Trump in a letter to order a review of the case of Derrick Miller, a former US Army National Guardsman sergeant who was sentenced in to life in prison with the chance of parole for the premeditated murder of an Afghan civilian during a battlefield interrogation, and the cases of other veterans who fought in Afghanistan and Iraq who were imprisoned for battlefield crimes.

After the 2020 presidential election, Babin joined many of his Republican colleagues in the House and Senate in an effort to overturn Joe Biden's victory. The House Select Committee on the January 6 Attack obtained 21 text messages from Babin to former White House chief of staff Mark Meadows about the outcome of the election. The first urged Meadows to "[f]ight like hell and find a way. We're with you down here in Texas and refuse to live under a corrupt Marxist dictatorship. Liberty!".

Babin supported efforts to impeach President Biden, having cosponsored a resolution to impeach Biden in September 2021. Also during the 117th Congress, Babin cosponsored a resolution to impeach Biden's secretary of homeland security Alejandro Mayorkas and another resolution to impeach Biden's secretary of state Antony Blinken. Very early into the 118th Congress, Babin cosponsored another resolution to impeach Secretary Mayorkas.

=== Committee assignments ===
- Committee on Science, Space and Technology
  - Subcommittee on Environment
  - Subcommittee on Space (Chairman)
- Committee on Transportation and Infrastructure
  - Subcommittee on Highways and Transit
  - Subcommittee on Railroads, Pipelines, and Hazardous Materials
  - Subcommittee on Water Resources and Environment

=== Caucus memberships ===
- Congressional Western Caucus
- Second Amendment Caucus
- Republican Study Committee

== Political positions ==
Babin cites water conservation, repealing the Affordable Care Act, and stopping illegal immigration as his main priorities. He believes in the Christian work ethic and that "if you don’t work, you don’t eat, if you are able to work." He supports term limits and wants to reduce the number of out of wedlock births and restore the traditional family unit. He also believes that taxes are too high and the tax code too complex.

Although Babin helped found and is a member of the Tyler County Patriots, he does not identify as a member of the Tea Party, saying, "I believe with all my heart in less government, lower taxes and more individual responsibility and more economic freedom, and you can put whatever label you want to on it."

=== Immigration ===
Babin supported Trump's 2017 executive order to temporarily curtail travel to the U.S. from six Middle Eastern nations until better screening methods are devised. After the EO was signed, he posted on social media: "Great news—now let’s get it into law!" Babin also wholeheartedly supported building a wall at the southern border.

Babin sponsored H.R. 6202, the American Tech Workforce Act of 2021, introduced by Representative Jim Banks. The legislation would establish a wage floor for the high-skill H-1B visa program, thereby significantly reducing employer dependence on the program. The bill would also eliminate the Optional Practical Training program that allows foreign graduates to stay and work in the United States.

In a September 2021 Newsmax interview, Babin said that Democrats were using immigration to "replace the American electorate with a third world electorate." These comments came one day after Tucker Carlson discussed the Great Replacement Theory in a Fox News segment, with the Anti-Defamation League noting that Babin was mirroring Carlson's rhetoric.

In 2025, Babin introduced a bill which would eliminate automatic birthright citizenship for children born to undocumented immigrant parents. The bill was intended to codify into federal legislation President Trump's executive order on birthright citizenship.

=== Israel ===
Babin voted to provide Israel with support following 2023 Hamas attack on Israel.

=== Transgender bathroom use ===
On May 19, 2016, Babin introduced HR 5294, the "Student Privacy Protection and Safety Act of 2016", which would invalidate the "Dear Colleague Letter on Transgender Students" until superseded by an Act of Congress. The "Dear Colleague" letter was an official correspondence jointly issued by the United States departments of Justice and Education on May 13 providing significant guidance that Title IX of the Education Amendments of 1972, which prohibits discrimination on the basis of sex, also prohibits discrimination based on a student's gender identity. Babin characterized HR 5294 as a "bathroom bill" in a subsequent press release, where he stated, in part, that "The federal government should not be in the business of throwing common sense and decency out the window and forcing local schools to permit a teenage boy who ‘identifies’ as a girl to use changing rooms, locker rooms and bathrooms with five-year-old girls."

Babin also cosponsored HR 5275, the "Prohibiting the Usurpation of Bathroom Laws through Independent Choice School Act (PUBLIC School Act) of 2016". HR 5275 would allow state and local governments to enact and enforce policies on the use of sex-segregated bathrooms and locker rooms. He also cosponsored HR 5307, the "Title IX Clarification Act of 2016", on May 24. HR 5307 would amend Title IX to define sex as 'the biological sex'. Later in 2016, Babin cosponsored HR 5812, the Civil Rights Uniformity Act of 2016. All four bills (HR 5294, 5275, 5307, and 5812) died in committee. HR 5812 was reissued in 2017 as the "Civil Rights Uniformity Act of 2017" (HR 2796), which Babin cosponsored on June 7, 2017.

=== Texas v. Pennsylvania ===
In December 2020, Babin was one of 126 Republican members of the House of Representatives to sign an amicus brief in support of Texas v. Pennsylvania, a lawsuit filed at the United States Supreme Court contesting the results of the 2020 presidential election, in which Joe Biden defeated Trump. The Supreme Court declined to hear the case on the basis that Texas lacked standing under Article III of the Constitution to challenge the results of an election held by another state.

=== 2024 Republican primary ===
Babin was named as part of the Trump campaign's Texas leadership team in March.

=== Veterans ===
The PACT ACT which expanded VA benefits to veterans exposed to toxic chemicals during their military service, received a "nay" from Babin.

=== Marijuana ===
As of July 2025, Babin has received an "F" rating from the National Organization for the Reform of Marijuana Laws (NORML) based on public statements and voting records.

U.S. House of Representatives
Preceded by Steve Stockman	Member of the U.S. House of Representatives from Texas's 36th congressional district 2015–present	Incumbent
Preceded by Frank Lucas	Chair of the House Science Committee; 2025–present	Incumbent
U.S. order of precedence (ceremonial)
Preceded by Rick Allen	United States representatives by seniority 127th	Succeeded by Don Beyer
