= Jack McDonald =

Jack McDonald may refer to:

- Jack McDonald (ice hockey, born 1887) (1887–1958), Canadian ice hockey left winger
- Jack McDonald (ice hockey goaltender) (fl. 1946–50), American ice hockey goaltender
- John McDonald (ice hockey) (1921–1990), known as Jack, ice hockey player
- Jack H. McDonald (1932–2022), U.S. Representative from Michigan
- Jack McDonald (baseball) (1844–1880), baseball player
- Jack McDonald (actor) (1880–1962), American actor
- Jack McDonald (American football) (1908–1989), American college football coach for Hofstra University
- Jack McDonald (English footballer) (1921–2007), English footballer with Wolverhampton Wanderers, Bournemouth, Fulham and Southampton
- Jack McDonald (Australian footballer) (born 1930), Australian rules footballer for St Kilda
- Jack McDonald (rugby union) (1914–1983), Australian rugby union player

== See also ==
- Jackie McDonald (born 1947), UDA member
- John McDonald (disambiguation)
- Jack MacDonald (disambiguation)
