= John S. Macdonald =

John S. Macdonald may refer to:

- John Sandfield Macdonald, first Premier of Ontario
- Harry Macdonough (John Scantlebury Macdonald), Canadian singer and recording executive of the early 20th century
- John S. MacDonald, Canadian engineer and businessman
- John Smyth Macdonald (1867–1941), British physiologist

== See also ==
- John Macdonald (disambiguation)
