= 2014 United States Senate election in Texas =

- November 4, 2014
- Turnout: 33.1%
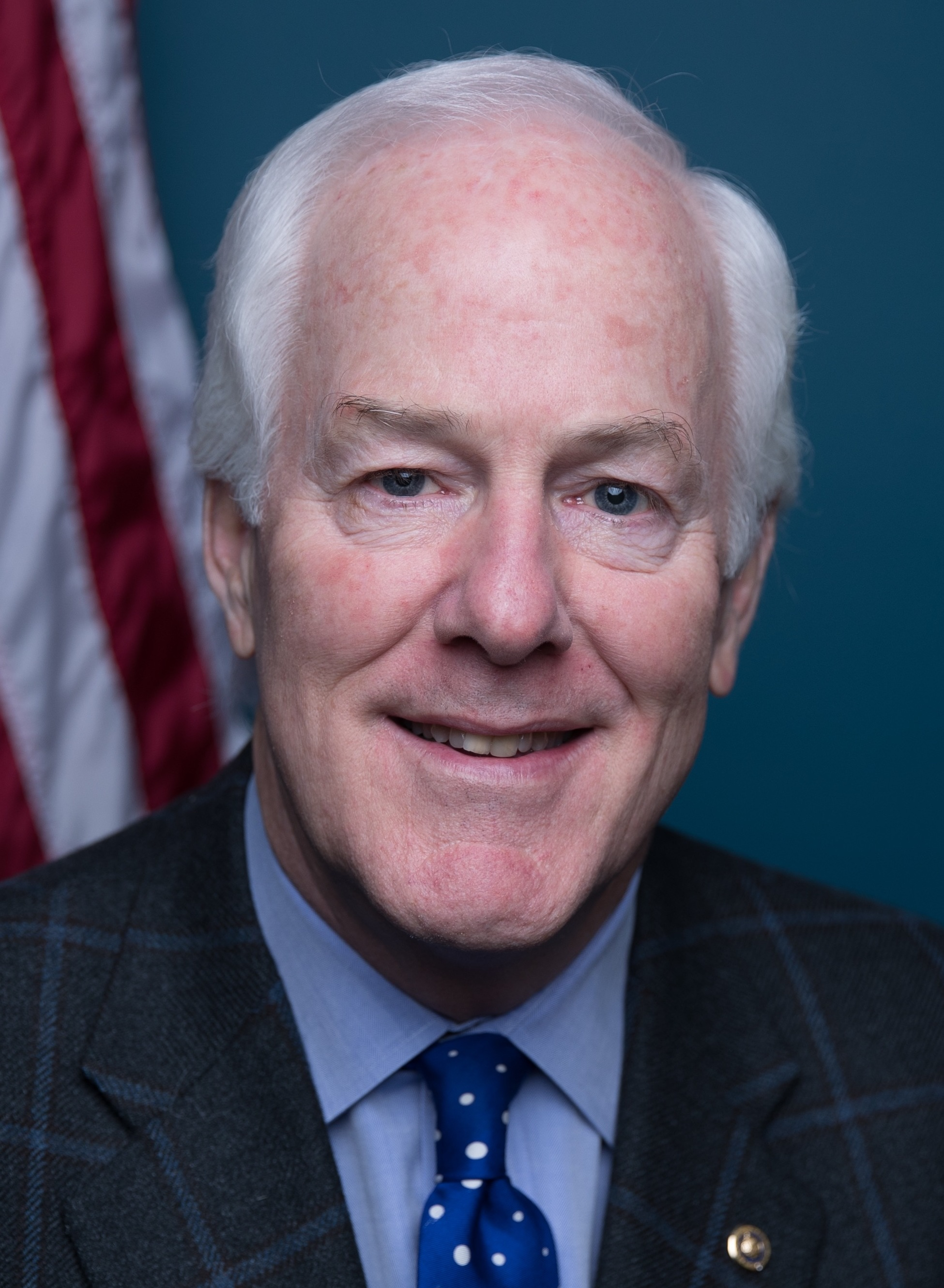

Nominee	John Cornyn	David Alameel
Party	Republican	Democratic
Popular vote	2,861,531	1,597,387
Percentage	61.56%	34.36%
- Cornyn: 40–50% 50–60% 60–70% 70–80% 80–90% >90% Alameel: 40–50% 50–60% 60–70% 70–80% 80–90% >90% Tie: 40–50% 50% No data
U.S. senator before election
John Cornyn
Republican
Elected U.S. Senator
John Cornyn
Republican

The 2014 United States Senate election in Texas was held on November 4, 2014, to elect a member of the United States Senate. Incumbent Republican senator and Senate Minority Whip John Cornyn ran for election to a third term. Primary elections were held on March 4, 2014. Since no Democratic candidate received over 50% in the first round of the primary, a runoff election was required on May 27, 2014. David Alameel, who came in first in the primary, won the runoff and became his party's nominee. In the general election, Cornyn defeated Alameel in a landslide.

This is the last time Bexar, Fort Bend, Harris and Hays would vote for a Republican in a U.S. Senate election.

== Republican primary ==
In February 2014, Republican Senate Minority Leader Mitch McConnell was targeted in a controversial television ad by Dwayne Stovall, who labeled McConnell—John Cornyn’s Senate leadership superior—an ineffective “Beltway turtle” out of touch with rank-and-file Republicans. Before the ad, Stovall’s candidacy had received little media attention.

=== Candidates ===
Nominee

- John Cornyn, incumbent U.S. Senator

==== Eliminated in primary ====
- Curt Cleaver, hotel industry consultant and candidate for the U.S. Senate in 2012
- Ken Cope, aerospace executive and retired United States Army Lieutenant Colonel
- Chris Mapp, businessman
- Reid Reasor, Tea Party activist
- Steve Stockman, U.S. Representative
- Dwayne Stovall, bridge construction contractor, school board member from Cleveland and candidate for the State House of Representatives in 2012
- Linda Vega, attorney and immigration activist

==== Withdrew ====
- Erick Wyatt, U.S. Army veteran

==== Declined ====
- Greg Abbott, Texas attorney general (ran for governor)
- David Barton, author, minister and former vice chair of the Republican Party of Texas
- David Dewhurst, Lieutenant Governor of Texas (ran for re-election)
- Louie Gohmert, U.S. Representative (ran for re-election)
- Debra Medina, activist and candidate for Governor in 2010 (ran for Comptroller of Public Accounts)

=== Endorsements ===
John Cornyn

Individuals

- Kay Granger, U.S. Representative
- James C. Ho, former Solicitor General of Texas
- Rick Perry, Governor of Texas
- Karl Rove, Republican campaign consultant; appeared with Cornyn in rally in Longview
- George Strake Jr., former chairman of the Republican Party of Texas, former Secretary of State of Texas, and unsuccessful candidate for Lieutenant Governor of Texas in 1982

Organizations

- Texas Right to Life PAC
- United States Chamber of Commerce
Steve Stockman

Individuals

- Jerome Corsi, historian and journalist

Organizations

- Revolution PAC
- Gun Owners of America
Linda Vega

Individuals

- Erick Wyatt, former candidate for the U.S. Senate
Declined to endorse

Individuals

- Greg Abbott, Texas Attorney General
- Ted Cruz, U.S. Senator
- Blake Farenthold, U.S. Representative
- Louie Gohmert, U.S. Representative
- Ralph Hall, U.S. Representative
- Ted Nugent, musician and conservative activist
- Kenny Marchant, U.S. Representative

Organizations

- Club for Growth

=== Polling ===
Poll source	Date(s) administered	Sample size	Margin of error	Curt Cleaver	Ken Cope	John Cornyn	Chris Mapp	Reid Reasor	Steve Stockman	Dwayne Stovall	Linda Vega	Other	Undecided
Public Policy Polling	November 1–4, 2013	388	± 4.4%	—	—	41%	—	—	18%	—	—	—	44%
Wilson Perkins Allen	December 13, 2013	762	± 3.6%	—	—	50%	—	—	6%	—	—	5%	39%
Gravis Marketing	February 10–12, 2014	729	± 3.6%	—	—	43%	—	—	28%	—	—	—	29%
UoT/Texas Tribune	February 7–17, 2014	461	± 4.56%	1%	4%	62%	3%	3%	16%	4%	7%	—	—

Poll source	Date(s) administered	Sample size	Margin of error	John Cornyn	Someone more conservative	Undecided
Gravis Marketing	October 26, 2013	563	± 3%	33%	46%	21%
Public Policy Polling	November 1–4, 2013	388	± 4.4%	33%	49%	18%

Hypothetical polling

Poll source	Date(s) administered	Sample size	Margin of error	John Cornyn	Dwayne Stovall	Erick Wyatt	Undecided
UoT/Texas Tribune	October 18–27, 2013	519	± 5.02%	39%	7%	6%	48%

Poll source	Date(s) administered	Sample size	Margin of error	John Cornyn	David Barton	Rafael Cruz	Louie Gohmert	Ron Paul	Rick Perry	Steve Stockman	Undecided
UoT/Texas Tribune	October 18–27, 2013	519	± 5.02%	25%	—	41%	—	18%	—	3%	13%
35%	—	—	—	—	46%	—	20%				
34%	—	—	—	44%	—	—	22%				
40%	—	—	31%	—	—	—	29%				
39%	—	33%	—	—	—	—	28%				
Public Policy Polling	November 1–4, 2013	388	± 4.4%	51%	18%	—	—	—	—	—	31%

=== Results ===
Republican primary results
Party	Candidate	Votes	%
Republican	John Cornyn (incumbent)	781,259	59.43%
Republican	Steve Stockman	251,577	19.13%
Republican	Dwayne Stovall	140,794	10.71%
Republican	Linda Vega	50,057	3.80%
Republican	Ken Cope	34,409	2.61%
Republican	Chris Mapp	23,535	1.79%
Republican	Reid Reasor	20,600	1.56%
Republican	Curt Cleaver	12,325	0.94%
Total votes		1,314,556	100.00%

Because Cornyn surpassed a majority in the primary, he faced no runoff election. Cornyn's winning percent and margin of victory were the lowest by any Texas Republican U.S. Senator in a primary election in state history.

== Democratic primary ==
=== Candidates ===
==== Nominee ====
- David Alameel, businessman and candidate for Texas's 33rd congressional district in 2012

Eliminated in the runoff

- Kesha Rogers, Worldwide LaRouche Youth Movement activist and nominee for Texas's 22nd congressional district in 2010 and 2012

Eliminated in the primary

- Michael Fjetland, businessman, Independent candidate for Texas's 22nd congressional district in 2004 and Republican candidate for the seat in 2006
- HyeTae "Harry" Kim, physician
- Maxey Scherr, attorney

==== Declined ====
- Wendy Davis, state senator (running for governor)
- Bill White, former mayor of Houston and nominee for governor in 2010

=== Endorsements ===
David Alameel

Individuals

- Roberto Alonzo, state representative
- John Wiley Bryant, former U.S. Representative (TX-05)
- Wendy Davis, State Senator and candidate for Governor
- Yvonne Davis, state representative
- Ryan Guillen, state representative
- Joe Pickett, state representative
- Ciro Rodriguez, former U.S. Representative (TX-23)
- Rosa Rosales, former national president of LULAC
- Chris Turner
- Carlos Uresti, state senator
- Leticia Van de Putte, State Senator and nominee for Lieutenant Governor
- Marc Veasey, U.S. Representative (TX-33)

Organizations

- Bexar County African-American Political Alliance
- Bexar County Northside Coalition of Women
- Bexar County Mexican American Democrats
- Bexar County Second Chance Democrats
- Bexar County Tejano Democrats
- Bexar County Young Tejano Democrats
- Hispanic Women for Better Justice
- Houston GLBT Political Caucus
- Mexican American Democrats of Texas, San Antonio Chapter
- Texas Young Democrats Women's Caucus

Media

- The Beaumont Enterprise
- The Dallas Morning News
- Fort Worth Star-Telegram
- The Houston Chronicle
Michael Fjetland

Media

- Texpatriate
Kesha Rogers

Organizations

- Doctors Against Murderous Obamacare
Maxey Scherr

Individuals

- Carol Alvarado, state representative
- John Cook, former Mayor of El Paso and nominee for Land Commissioner
- Veronica Escobar, El Paso County Judge
- David Langston, former Mayor of Lubbock
- Sergio Lewis, El Paso County Commissioner
- Marisa Marquez, state representative
- Joe Moody, state representative
- Beto O'Rourke, U.S. Representative (TX-16)
- Barbara Ann Radnofsky, nominee for U.S. Senate in 2006 and for Attorney General in 2010
- Silvestre Reyes, former U.S. Representative
- José R. Rodríguez, state senator
- Eliot Shapleigh, former state senator
- Sylvester Turner, state representative
- Armando Walle, state representative

Organizations

- Amalgamated Transit Union Local 694
- American Federation of State, County and Municipal Employees (AFSCME) Local 59
- Austin Environmental Democrats
- Austin North by Northwest (NxNW) Democrats
- Austin Progressive Coalition
- Austin Stonewall Democrats
- Austin Young Democrats
- Bay Area New Democrats (BAND)
- Capital Area Asian American Democrats
- Central Austin Democrats
- Democracy for Houston
- El Paso Black Democrats
- El Paso Central Labor Union
- El Paso West Side Democrats
- Galveston Democratic Coalition
- International Association of Fire Fighters Local 51
- NE Travis County Democrats
- San Antonio Stonewall Democrats
- South East Texas Stonewall Democrats
- State Tejano Democrats
- Texas Womans Coalition
- University Democrats (UDems)
- University of Houston Democrats

Media

- The Austin Chronicle
- Burnt Orange Report
- Jewish Herald-Voice
- Lubbock Avalanche-Journal
- San Antonio Express-News

=== Polling ===
Poll source	Date(s) administered	Sample size	Margin of error	David Alameel	Michael Fjetland	Harry Kim	Kesha Rogers	Maxey Scherr	Other	Undecided
UoT/Texas Tribune	February 7–17, 2014	263	± 6.04%	27%	9%	14%	35%	15%	—	—

First round results by county: Alameel: 20–30%; 30–40%; 40–50%; 50–60%; 60–70%; Rogers: 20–30%; 30–40%; 40–50%; 50–60%; Scherr: 30–40%; 40–50%; 50–60%; Kim: 20–30%; 30–40%; 50–60%; Tie: Tie

=== Results ===
Democratic primary results
Party	Candidate	Votes	%
Democratic	David Alameel	239,914	47.04%
Democratic	Kesha Rogers	110,146	21.59%
Democratic	Maxey Scherr	90,359	17.71%
Democratic	HyeTae "Harry" Kim	45,207	8.86%
Democratic	Michael Fjetland	24,383	4.80%
Total votes		510,009	100.00%

Runoff results by county: Alameel: 50–60%; 60–70%; 70–80%; 80–90%; >90%; Rogers: 50–60%; 60–70%; 70–80%; 80–90%; >90%; Tie: Tie

=== Runoff ===
Because no candidate received over 50% of the vote in the primary, the two with the most votes – David Alameel and Kesha Rogers – advanced to a runoff on May 27.

Democratic primary runoff results
Party	Candidate	Votes	%
Democratic	David Alameel	145,039	72.16%
Democratic	Kesha Rogers	55,953	27.84%
Total votes		200,992	100.00%

== Libertarian convention ==
=== Candidates ===
==== Nominee ====
- Rebecca Paddock, electrical engineer

Eliminated at the convention

- Tanuja Paruchuri, holistic wellness coach
- Jon Roland, computer programmer and nominee for Texas Attorney General in 2002, 2006 and 2010

== Green nomination ==
=== Candidates ===
==== Nominee ====
- Emily Marie Sanchez

== General election ==
=== Debates ===
2014 United States Senate election in Texas debate
No.	Date	Host	Moderator	Link	Republican	Democratic
Key: P Participant A Absent N Not invited I Invited W Withdrawn						
Key: P Participant A Absent N Not invited I Invited W Withdrawn					John Cornyn	David Alameel
1	Oct. 24, 2014	KUVN-DT	Wendy Cruz		P	P

=== Predictions ===
Source	Ranking	As of
The Cook Political Report	Solid R	November 3, 2014
Sabato's Crystal Ball	Safe R	November 3, 2014
Rothenberg Political Report	Safe R	November 3, 2014
Real Clear Politics	Safe R	November 3, 2014

=== Polling ===
Poll source	Date(s) administered	Sample size	Margin of error	John Cornyn (R)	David Alameel (D)	Other	Undecided
Public Policy Polling	April 10–13, 2014	559	± 4.1%	49%	32%	—	20%
UoT/Texas Tribune	May 30 – June 8, 2014	1,200	± 2.83%	36%	25%	13%	26%
CBS News/NYT/YouGov	July 5–24, 2014	4,353	± 3.7%	52%	35%	3%	10%
Rasmussen Reports	August 4–5, 2014	4,353	± 3.0%	47%	29%	6%	19%
CBS News/NYT/YouGov	August 18 – September 2, 2014	4,189	± 2%	55%	39%	3%	8%
Texas Lyceum	September 11–25, 2014	666	± 3.8%	48%	30%	8%	14%
CBS News/NYT/YouGov	September 20 – October 1, 2014	4,177	± 2%	55%	35%	1%	9%
Rasmussen Reports	October 1–2, 2014	840	± 3.5%	50%	29%	6%	15%
UoT/Texas Tribune	October 10–19, 2014	866	± 3.6%	57%	31%	12%	—
CBS News/NYT/YouGov	October 16–23, 2014	3,987	± 3%	57%	35%	1%	8%

Hypothetical polling

With Castro

Poll source	Date(s) administered	Sample size	Margin of error	John Cornyn (R)	Julian Castro (D)	Undecided
Public Policy Polling	January 24–27, 2012	500	± 4.4%	48%	41%	11%
Public Policy Polling	June 28 – July 1, 2013	500	± 4.4%	50%	37%	13%
Public Policy Polling	November 1–4, 2013	500	± 4.4%	49%	35%	17%

Poll source	Date(s) administered	Sample size	Margin of error	Louie Gohmert (R)	Julian Castro (D)	Undecided
Public Policy Polling	November 1–4, 2013	500	± 4.4%	44%	35%	21%

With Davis

Poll source	Date(s) administered	Sample size	Margin of error	John Cornyn (R)	Wendy Davis (D)	Undecided
Public Policy Polling	January 24–27, 2012	500	± 4.4%	48%	37%	14%
Public Policy Polling	June 28 – July 1, 2013	500	± 4.4%	48%	40%	12%

With Parker

Poll source	Date(s) administered	Sample size	Margin of error	John Cornyn (R)	Annise Parker (D)	Undecided
Public Policy Polling	January 24–27, 2012	500	± 4.4%	47%	36%	16%
Public Policy Polling	June 28 – July 1, 2013	500	± 4.4%	49%	36%	15%

With White

Poll source	Date(s) administered	Sample size	Margin of error	John Cornyn (R)	Bill White (D)	Undecided
Public Policy Polling	January 24–27, 2012	500	± 4.4%	45%	42%	13%
Public Policy Polling	June 28 – July 1, 2013	500	± 4.4%	47%	40%	13%
Public Policy Polling	November 1–4, 2013	500	± 4.4%	44%	39%	17%

Poll source	Date(s) administered	Sample size	Margin of error	Louie Gohmert (R)	Bill White (D)	Undecided
Public Policy Polling	November 1–4, 2013	500	± 4.4%	40%	39%	21%

=== Results ===
2014 United States Senate election in Texas
Party	Candidate	Votes	%	±%
Republican	John Cornyn (incumbent)	2,861,531	61.56%	+6.74%
Democratic	David Alameel	1,597,387	34.36%	−8.48%
Libertarian	Rebecca Paddock	133,751	2.88%	+0.54%
Green	Emily Sanchez	54,701	1.18%	N/A
Independent	Mohammed Tahiro (write-in)	998	0.02%	N/A
Total votes		4,648,358	100.0%	N/A
Republican hold				

==== Counties that flipped from Democratic to Republican ====
- Bexar (largest municipality: San Antonio)
- Culberson (largest municipality: Van Horn)
- Harris (largest municipality: Houston)
- Kenedy (largest municipality: Sarita)
- Kleberg (largest municipality: Kingsville)
- La Salle (largest municipality: Cotulla)
- Reeves (largest municipality: Pecos)
- Brewster (largest city: Alpine)
- Uvalde (largest city: Uvalde)
- Nueces (largest municipality: Corpus Christi)
- Val Verde (largest municipality: Del Rio)
- Jefferson (largest city: Beaumont)
- Hudspeth (largest city: Fort Hancock)

==== By congressional district ====
Cornyn won 26 of 36 congressional districts, including one that elected a Democrat. (Note: Not including third party candidates.)

District	Cornyn	Alameel	Representative
1st	79%	21%	Louie Gohmert
2nd	68%	32%	Ted Poe
3rd	70%	30%	Sam Johnson
4th	80%	20%	Ralph Hall (113th Congress)
4th	80%	20%	John Ratcliffe (114th Congress)
5th	71%	29%	Jeb Hensarling
6th	63%	37%	Joe Barton
7th	67%	33%	John Culberson
8th	83%	17%	Kevin Brady
9th	26%	74%	Al Green
10th	64%	36%	Michael McCaul
11th	87%	13%	Mike Conaway
12th	71%	29%	Kay Granger
13th	87%	13%	Mac Thornberry
14th	64%	36%	Randy Weber
15th	49.9%	50.1%	Rubén Hinojosa
16th	44%	56%	Beto O'Rourke
17th	68%	32%	Bill Flores
18th	27%	73%	Sheila Jackson Lee
19th	84%	16%	Randy Neugebauer
20th	49%	51%	Joaquín Castro
21st	65%	35%	Lamar Smith
22nd	68%	32%	Pete Olson
23rd	61%	39%	Pete Gallego (113th Congress)
23rd	61%	39%	Will Hurd (114th Congress)
24th	67%	33%	Kenny Marchant
25th	64%	36%	Roger Williams
26th	73%	27%	Michael Burgess
27th	69%	31%	Blake Farenthold
28th	50.1%	49.9%	Henry Cuellar
29th	39%	61%	Gene Green
30th	23%	77%	Eddie Bernice Johnson
31st	67%	33%	John Carter
32nd	64%	36%	Pete Sessions
33rd	32%	68%	Marc Veasey
34th	49.6%	50.4%	Filemon Vela Jr.
35th	41%	59%	Lloyd Doggett
36th	78%	22%	Steve Stockman (113th Congress)
36th	78%	22%	Brian Babin (114th Congress)

== See also ==
- 2014 United States Senate elections
- 2014 United States elections
- 2014 United States House of Representatives elections in Texas
- 2014 Texas gubernatorial election
