= Steve Stockman =

American politician (born 1956)

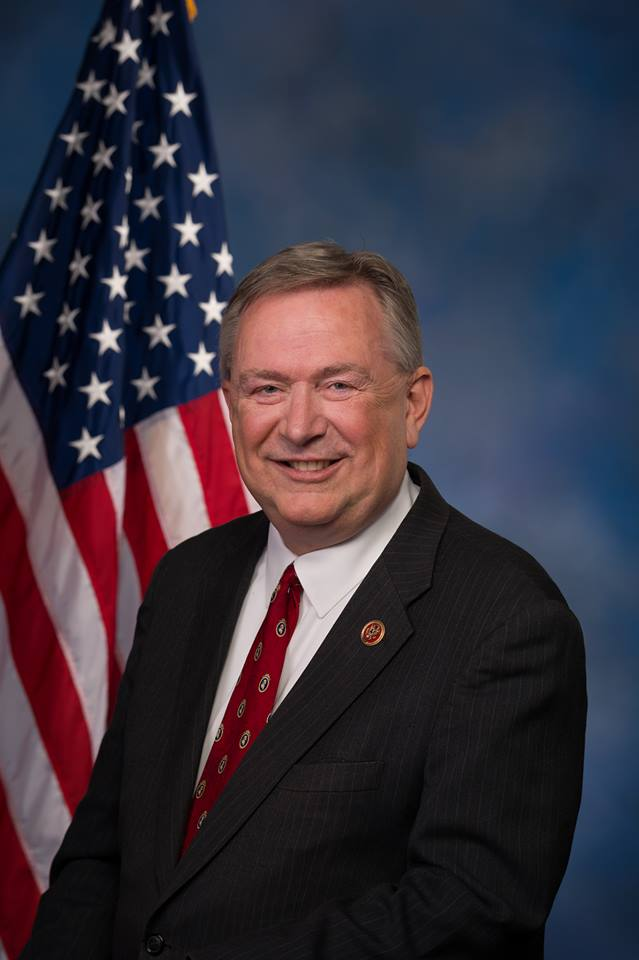
- Official portrait, 2014

Member of the U.S. House of Representatives from Texas
- In office January 3, 2013 – January 3, 2015
- Preceded by: Constituency established
- Succeeded by: Brian Babin
- Constituency: 36th district
- In office January 3, 1995 – January 3, 1997
- Preceded by: Jack Brooks
- Succeeded by: Nick Lampson
- Constituency: 9th district

Personal details
- Born: Stephen Ernest Stockman; November 14, 1956 (age 69) Bloomfield Hills, Michigan, U.S.
- Party: Republican
- Spouse: Patti Ferguson (m. 1988)
- Education: San Jacinto College; University of Houston, Clear Lake (BS)

Stephen Ernest Stockman (born November 14, 1956) is an American politician and convicted criminal. He served as the U.S. representative for Texas's 9th congressional district from 1995 to 1997 and for Texas's 36th congressional district from 2013 to 2015. Stockman ran in the Republican primary for the United States Senate in the 2014 election but lost to incumbent Senator John Cornyn.

In 2018, Stockman was convicted on 23 felony counts related to money laundering and misuse of campaign contributions. He was sentenced to serve ten years in prison, and was ordered to pay $1 million in restitution.

On December 22, 2020, President Donald Trump commuted Stockman's prison term.

== Early life, education, and business career ==
Stockman was born in Bloomfield Hills, Michigan, outside Detroit. His parents were evangelistic Christian teachers. He graduated from Dondero High School in Royal Oak, Michigan. From 1985 to 1986, he attended San Jacinto College but dropped out because he suffered from what he called "partying syndrome". In 1977 as Stockman was reporting to jail for traffic tickets, the jailers found valium in his possession after his girlfriend allegedly hid some in his underwear. He was charged with felony possession of a controlled substance, but the charge was later dropped. He later became a born-again Christian. In 1990, he earned a bachelor's degree in accounting from the University of Houston–Clear Lake. He worked as a computer salesman in Friendswood, Texas.

== U.S. House of Representatives (1995–1997) ==
=== Elections ===
1990

Stockman's first run for Congress was in March 1990 in Texas's 9th congressional district. The district, anchored by Beaumont and Galveston, had been represented by Democratic Representative Jack Brooks since 1953. His primary challenger was Beaumont mayor Maury Meyers. Oliver North made appearances at two of Stockman's fundraisers.

Meyers got 44.3% of the primary vote; Stockman, 41%. Since no candidate had a majority, there was a runoff election and, with the support of third-place finisher Steve Clifford, Meyers beat Stockman to win the Republican nomination.

1992

Stockman ran again in 1992 for the House in District 9. This time he was unopposed in the primary. The 1992 Republican National Convention was held in Houston in August of that year. Stockman organized a "congressional cruise" on the Houston Ship Channel as a fundraising opportunity, but no members of Congress attended. Democrat Brooks defeated him 56% to 44%.

1994

Stockman ran again for House District 9 in 1994. He had two challengers in the Republican primary: John LeCour and James Milburn. Stockman won the primary with a landslide 74%.

His Democratic opponent in the general election was, as before, incumbent Jack Brooks. Initially the NRA Political Victory Fund (NRA-PVF) endorsed Brooks and even donated $5,000 to his cause, while the Gun Owners of America endorsed Stockman. However, a number of NRA members threatened to resign from the organization over the issue and the NRA withdrew their support for Brooks, remaining neutral in the race. In a major upset, Stockman beat Brooks, who, had he won, would have become Dean of the United States House of Representatives, by 51% to 49%.

1996

Stockman ran unopposed in the 1996 Republican primary. In July a federal court ordered the boundaries of 13 Texas House districts to be redrawn because of racial gerrymandering, although Stockman's district was barely affected. Stockman won a plurality in the November election with 46%, forcing a runoff against Democratic Jefferson County assessor Nick Lampson. Lampson won the runoff election with 53% of the vote.

=== Tenure ===
During his 1995 term, Stockman opposed the U.S. bailout of the Mexican peso.

In 1995, Stockman wrote an article for Guns & Ammo claiming that the Waco siege had been orchestrated by the Clinton administration in order "to prove the need for a ban on so-called 'assault weapons.'" He wrote further that "[h]ad Bill Clinton really been unhappy with what Attorney General Janet Reno ordered, he would not only have fired her, he would have had Reno indicted for premeditated murder." After the article was published, Stockman's office denied that he believed in Waco "conspiracy theories."

In 1995, Stockman called for a Congressional investigation into Alfred Kinsey's 1948 study Sexual Behavior in the Human Male after learning that Kinsey had used data from the diary of a pedophile. Stockman believed that the allegations discredited current theories of sexual education in the United States, writing to his congressional colleagues that"[o]ur children have been taught that ... any type of sex is a valid outlet for their emotions. They are taught that the problem with sex is not that it is wrong to engage in homosexual, bestial, underage, or premarital sex, but that it is wrong to do so without protection."

In 1995 and 1996, Stockman was proud to have played a role in the federal government's shutdown. A 2010 Congressional Research Service report summarized other details of the 1995–1996 government shutdowns, indicating the shutdown impacted all sectors of the economy. Health and welfare services for military veterans were curtailed; the Centers for Disease Control and Prevention stopped disease surveillance; new clinical research patients were not accepted at the National Institutes of Health; and toxic waste cleanup at 609 sites was halted. Other impacts included: the closure of 368 National Park sites resulted in the loss of some seven million visitors; 200,000 applications for passports were not processed; and 20,000-30,000 applications by foreigners for visas went unprocessed each day; U.S. tourism and airline industries incurred millions of dollars in losses; more than 20% of federal contracts, representing $3.7 billion in spending, were affected adversely. The first of the two shutdowns caused the furlough of about 800,000 workers, while the second caused about 284,000 workers to be furloughed. They were said to have cost Stockman his reelection in 1996, and the Republican loss of seven seats in the House.

Committee assignments

- House Committee on Banking and Financial Services
  - Subcommittee on Oversight and Investigations
- House Committee on Science
  - Subcommittee on Energy
  - Subcommittee on Environment

== Inter-congressional career (1997–2013) ==
In 1998, Stockman ran unsuccessfully in the Republican primary for the Texas Railroad Commission.

Between 2005 and 2007, Stockman worked with the conservative Leadership Institute as director of its Campus Leadership Program.

In 2006, he attempted to run as an independent candidate for Texas's 22nd congressional district, Tom DeLay's former seat, and even though he had enough signatures to qualify for ballot access, the Texas Secretary of State invalidated enough signatures to make him ineligible. Stockman registered for the special election to fill out the remainder of DeLay's term; he was one of five candidates. He finished third, with 10.75% of the vote.

During his time away from Congress, Stockman also cared for his father, who had Alzheimer's disease. The cost of caring for him drove Stockman to declare bankruptcy and, when his father's disease became too severe, Stockman moved him to a veterans' home. When his father died, Stockman decided to run for Congress in the 2012 elections.

== U.S. House of Representatives (2013–2015) ==
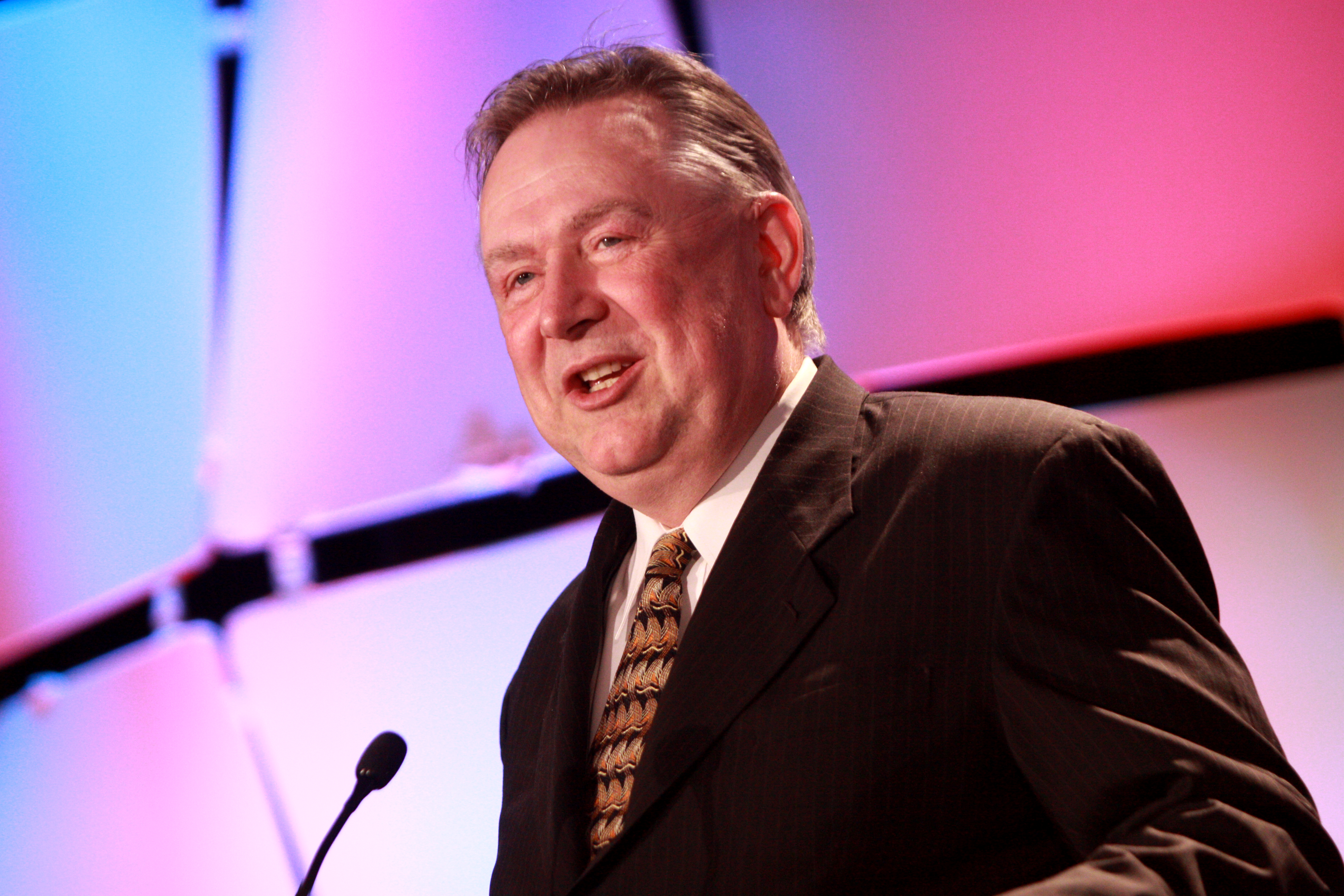
Stockman at the 2013 Liberty Political Action Conference

=== Election ===
In 2011 Stockman formed an exploratory committee, Friends of Steve Stockman, to consider a run for the 14th district seat being vacated by unsuccessful presidential candidate Ron Paul. Stockman instead ran in 2012 in the newly created 36th District. It included the Harris County portion of Friendswood, where Stockman's home was located. The district was drawn to be heavily Republican, and it was understood that whoever won the Republican primary would be the district's first congressman. In the May 29 primary, Stockman finished second in the first round, behind Stephen Vincent Takach, a financial planner. Takach finished with 22 percent of the vote, far short of the 50 percent threshold required to win. Stockman defeated Takach in the July 31 runoff 55%–45%, all but assuring his return to Congress after a 16-year absence.

In the November general election, Stockman defeated Democrat Max Owen Martin, a retired pilot from Clear Lake City, Texas, with 71% of the vote.

=== Tenure ===
In 2013, Stockman was one of ten Republicans who did not vote for John Boehner (R-Ohio) for Speaker of the House; he was the only representative to vote "Present" as his protest vote.

Stockman opposes the Affordable Care Act (ACA). In 2013, Stockman supported a government shutdown caused by Republican members of Congress who sought to block a continuing resolution that includes funding for the Affordable Care Act. Stockman's last-minute decision to challenge Cornyn in the Republican primary for Senate was "sparked in part by Cornyn's role in helping end" the federal shutdown.

In January 2013, Stockman introduced the "Safe Schools Act," a bill that would repeal the Gun-Free School Zones Act of 1990. Stockman introduced the bill following the Sandy Hook Elementary School shooting. He asserted that "By disarming qualified citizens and officials in schools we have created a dangerous situation for our children." The same month, Stockman issued a press release condemning gun control executive orders issued by President Barack Obama post-Sandy Hook, stating, "I will seek to thwart this action by any means necessary, including but not limited to eliminating funding for implementation, defunding the White House, and even filing articles of impeachment."

In February 2013, Stockman voted against the re-authorization of the Violence Against Women Act, objecting to provisions in the bill that expanded protections for transgender victims of domestic violence. Stockman said, "This is helping the liberals, this is horrible. Unbelievable. What really bothers—it's called a women's act, but then they have men dressed up as women, they count that. Change-gender, or whatever. How is that—how is that a woman?" That same month, Stockman also invited Ted Nugent, noted for his violent criticisms of Obama and other Democratic figures, to the 2013 State of the Union Address address.

On April 25, 2014, Stockman stated that the House Ethics Committee was investigating a campaign finance reporting error made by a former campaign worker. Stockman said the mistake was corrected soon after he learned of it, and that the worker had been removed from the campaign organization.

=== Committee assignments ===
- Committee on Foreign Affairs
  - Subcommittee on Africa, Global Health, Global Human Rights and International Organizations
  - Subcommittee on Europe, Eurasia and Emerging Threats
- Committee on Science, Space and Technology
  - Subcommittee on Research
  - Subcommittee on Space

Caucus memberships

- Congressional Constitution Caucus

== 2014 U.S. Senate election ==
On December 9, 2013, Stockman filed for the Republican nomination for U.S. Senate for Texas against incumbent U.S. Senator John Cornyn. On December 31, Stockman visited Bitcoin center NYC to raise money and became the first U.S. Senate candidate to officially accept campaign contributions in cryptocurrency.

Donald "Donny" Ferguson, the former executive director of Western Tradition Partnership/American Tradition Partnership (ATP) and manager of their Washington, D.C. office, resigned on 3 January 2013, as it continued to suffer adverse rulings in Montana courts over alleged campaign finance violations. Ferguson then became the congressional staffer and then U.S. Senate campaign spokesperson for Stockman.

On March 4, 2014, Stockman polled 250,759 votes (19.2 percent) in his bid for the Republican nomination for the Senate. He placed second in a field of eight candidates on the ballot. Cornyn received 778,967 votes (59.44 percent). On election night, Stockman quickly conceded and called upon Texas Republicans to vote the straight party ticket on November 4, 2014.

Meanwhile, Brian Babin won the seat for District 36 as Stockman did not contest this seat.

== Criminal case ==
In March 2017, Stockman was arrested for allegedly conspiring to use contributions designated for a charity to fund his campaign and for personal use, a felony, under 18 U.S.C. § 371.

According to the Federal Bureau of Investigation (FBI), in January 2013, Stockman requested and received $350,000 in donations from an unidentified businessman. Stockman allegedly solicited the money by using the name of Life Without Limits, a Las Vegas-based nonprofit intended to help people who have experienced traumatic events. The donation was allegedly intended to be used to renovate the Freedom House in Washington D.C.

Stockman was also charged with conspiracy to falsify statements when reporting contributions to try to launder the money.

The FBI alleged that at the time of the events in question, Stockman had no formal control of the Life Without Limits organization, but that he had opened multiple bank accounts under the name "Stephen E Stockman dba Life Without Limits." The FBI also alleged that financial records indicate that Stockman "made no significant expenditures toward the purchase, renovation, or operation of the 'Freedom House,' which was never opened."

=== Thomas Dodd ===
Stockman conspired with Thomas Dodd, a former campaign worker and congressional special assistant. According to the Houston Chronicle, the alleged conspiracy involved attempts "to bilk conservative foundations out of at least $775,000 in donations meant for charitable purposes or voter education". Dodd was indicted by a Federal grand jury in Houston and, on March 20, 2017, he pleaded guilty. Dodd was sentenced to 18 months and ordered to pay a fine of $800,000.

=== Jason Posey ===
Stockman staffer Jason Posey entered a guilty plea before Chief U.S. District Judge Lee Rosenthal to counts of wire fraud, mail fraud, and money laundering. He faced a prison term of up to 45 years and a fine of more than $4.8 million, plus hundreds of thousands more in restitution. Posey admitted that at Stockman's direction he and Dodd illegally funneled hundreds of thousands of dollars from charitable foundations and individuals in charge of the foundations to pay for Stockman's campaigns and personal expenses. On April 2, 2019, Posey was sentenced to 18 months and ordered to pay a fine of $720,000.

On March 28, 2017, a federal grand jury issued a 28 count indictment that included 24 counts against Stockman. He was accused of obtaining $1.25 million under false pretenses and using the funds for his political campaigns. He was charged with eleven counts of money laundering, eight counts of mail and wire fraud, one count of conspiracy to make "conduit contributions" and false statements (conspiracy to conceal the real source of the contributions by false attribution), two counts of making false statements to the Federal Election Commission, one count of making excessive contributions, and one count of willfully filing a false 2013 Federal income tax return by not reporting some of his income. Posey was charged with money laundering, mail and wire fraud, conspiracy to make conduit contributions and false statements, making false statements to the Federal Election Commission, making excessive contributions, and falsification of records. Due to its complexity and the need for time to review 142,378 pages of documents disclosed by the prosecution, a motion for postponement of Stockman's trial by his court-appointed attorney was granted. His trial began on January 29, 2018.

On April 12, 2018, Stockman was convicted by a jury on 23 of the 24 felony counts against him, for which he faced up to 20 years in prison for each count. He was acquitted on one count of wire fraud. Because he was judged to be a flight risk, he was remanded into custody pending sentencing, which was re-set for November 7, 2018.

On November 7, 2018, he was sentenced to serve ten years in prison and ordered to pay $1,014,718.51 in restitution, to be followed by three years of supervised release. Stockman served his sentence at the low-security federal prison in Beaumont, Texas.

On December 22, 2020, Stockman's sentence was commuted by President Donald Trump and he was released from the Beaumont facility, serving only two years of his ten-year sentence. According to the White House, he will remain subject to a period of supervised release and an order requiring that he pay more than $1,000,000 in restitution.

== Activities after prison sentence commutation ==
In 2020, President Trump commuted Stockman's sentence for the conviction of 23 federal corruption charges. A White House press release emphasized that the commutation was because Stockman was 64 years old, had already contracted COVID once while in prison, and had pre-existing health conditions that put him at risk from COVID infections.

In 2025, after the state legislature redrew the 9th Congressional District (which was held by Representative Al Green) to make it less diverse and include more conservative voters, Stockman declared his candidacy in the Republican primary for that seat. Although his indictments came under Trump's first administration and his crimes were prosecuted under a Trump-appointed US Attorney and affirmed in 2020 by a conservative Court of Appeals, during his campaign Stockman announced that he was a victim of President Obama and political persecution.

In the Republican primary, he came in third with 16.3% of the Republican vote, and did not advance to the runoff between the top two contenders.

As of June 2026, there has been no reporting on whether Stockman has repaid his victims the over-$1 million still owed in restitution.

U.S. House of Representatives
Preceded by Jack Brooks	Member of the U.S. House of Representatives from Texas's 9th congressional district 1995–1997	Succeeded by Nick Lampson
New constituency	Member of the U.S. House of Representatives from Texas's 36th congressional district 2013–2015	Succeeded by Brian Babin
U.S. order of precedence (ceremonial)
Preceded by Beau Boulter as Former U.S. Representative	Order of precedence of the United States as Former U.S. Representative	Succeeded by Van Taylor as Former U.S. Representative
