= Texas's 36th congressional district =

U.S. House district for Texas

Coordinates: 30.7800°N 93.7500°W

- Interactive map of district boundaries
- Representative: Brian Babin; R–Woodville
- Distribution: 67.74% urban; 32.26% rural
- Population (2025): 830,774
- Median household income: $81,901
- Ethnicity: 49.3% White; 30.9% Hispanic; 11.9% Black; 4.0% Asian; 3.1% Two or more races; 0.8% other
- Cook PVI: R+18

Texas's 36th congressional district is a district that was created as a result of the 2010 census. The first candidates ran in the 2012 House elections for a seat in the 113th United States Congress. Steve Stockman won the general election, and represented the new district. On December 9, 2013, Stockman announced that he would not seek reelection in 2014, and would instead challenge incumbent John Cornyn in the Republican senatorial primary, and was succeeded in the U.S. House by Brian Babin.

Texas's 36th congressional district is located in southeast Texas and includes all of Chambers, Hardin, Jasper, Liberty, Newton, and Tyler counties, plus portions of southeastern Harris County and northwestern Jefferson County. The Johnson Space Center is within the district. Having only recently been established, the 36th district is one of only two districts in Texas (the other being the 31st district) that has never been represented by a member of the Democratic Party.

== Recent election results from statewide races ==
=== 2023–2027 boundaries ===
Year	Office	Results
2008	President	McCain 66% - 34%
2012	President	Romney 69% - 31%
2014	Senate	Cornyn 73% - 27%
2014	Governor	Abbott 70% - 30%
2016	President	Trump 65% - 32%
2018	Senate	Cruz 64% - 35%
2018	Governor	Abbott 68% - 31%
2018	Lt. Governor	Patrick 64% - 34%
2018	Attorney General	Paxton 63% - 35%
2018	Comptroller of Public Accounts	Hegar 65% - 32%
2020	President	Trump 65% - 34%
2020	Senate	Cornyn 66% - 32%
2022	Governor	Abbott 67% - 31%
2022	Lt. Governor	Patrick 67% - 31%
2022	Attorney General	Paxton 67% - 31%
2022	Comptroller of Public Accounts	Hegar 69% - 29%
2024	President	Trump 68% - 31%
2024	Senate	Cruz 65% - 33%

=== 2027–2033 boundaries ===
Year	Office	Results
2008	President	McCain 60% - 39%
2012	President	Romney 63% - 37%
2014	Senate	Cornyn 67% - 33%
2014	Governor	Abbott 64% - 36%
2016	President	Trump 58% - 38%
2018	Senate	Cruz 58% - 42%
2018	Governor	Abbott 62% - 37%
2018	Lt. Governor	Patrick 57% - 41%
2018	Attorney General	Paxton 57% - 41%
2018	Comptroller of Public Accounts	Hegar 59% - 38%
2020	President	Trump 59% - 40%
2020	Senate	Cornyn 59% - 38%
2022	Governor	Abbott 62% - 37%
2022	Lt. Governor	Patrick 61% - 37%
2022	Attorney General	Paxton 61% - 37%
2022	Comptroller of Public Accounts	Hegar 63% - 35%
2024	President	Trump 62% - 37%
2024	Senate	Cruz 59% - 39%
2026	Senate	Paxton 49% - 48%
2026	Governor	Abbott 52% - 47%

== Current composition ==
For the 118th and successive Congresses (based on redistricting following the 2020 census), the district contains all or portions of the following counties and communities:

Chambers County (9)

All 9 communities

Hardin County (7)

All 7 communities

Harris County (16)

Baytown (part; also 2nd; shared with Chambers County), Channelview (part; also 2nd and 29th), Deer Park, El Lago, Friendswood (part; also 14th; shared with Galveston County), Houston (part; also 2nd, 7th, 8th, 9th, 18th, 22nd, 29th, 38th; shared with Fort Bend and Montgomery counties), La Porte, League City (part; also 14th; shared with Galveston County), Morgan's Point, Nassau Bay, Pasadena (part; also 29th), Pearland (part; also 22nd; shared with Brazoria County), Seabrook, Shoreacres, Taylor Lake Village, Webster

Jasper County (6)

All 6 communities

Jefferson County (5)

Beaumont (part; also 14th), Bevil Oaks, China, Fannett (part; also 14th), Nome

Liberty County (16)

All 16 communities

Newton County (3)

All 3 communities

Tyler County (6)

All 6 communities

== Future composition ==
Beginning with the 2026 election, the 36th district will consist of the following counties:

- Angelina
- Chambers
- Hardin
- Harris (part)
- Jasper
- Jefferson (part)
- Liberty
- Newton
- Tyler

== List of members representing the district ==
Member	Party	Years	Cong ress	Electoral history	District location
District established January 3, 2013
Steve Stockman (Seabrook)	Republican	January 3, 2013 – January 3, 2015	113th	Elected in 2012. Retired to run for U.S. Senator.	2013–2023 Chambers, Hardin, Harris (part), Jasper, Liberty, Newton, Orange, Polk, and Tyler
Brian Babin (Woodville)	Republican	January 3, 2015 – present	114th 115th 116th 117th 118th 119th	Elected in 2014. Re-elected in 2016. Re-elected in 2018. Re-elected in 2020. Re-elected in 2022. Re-elected in 2024. Re-elected in 2026.	2013–2023 Chambers, Hardin, Harris (part), Jasper, Liberty, Newton, Orange, Polk, and Tyler
Brian Babin (Woodville)	Republican	January 3, 2015 – present	114th 115th 116th 117th 118th 119th	Elected in 2014. Re-elected in 2016. Re-elected in 2018. Re-elected in 2020. Re-elected in 2022. Re-elected in 2024. Re-elected in 2026.	2023–present Chambers, Hardin, Harris (part), Jasper, Jefferson (part), Liberty, Newton, and Tyler

== Election results ==
The first iteration of the district included portions of four previous congressional districts that were represented by:

- Kevin Brady: Newton, Jasper, Tyler, Polk, Orange, Hardin Counties and a portion of Liberty County
- Ted Poe: the other portion of Liberty County and a portion of northeast Harris County
- Ron Paul: Chambers County
- Gene Green: a portion of east Harris County
- Pete Olson: a portion of southeast Harris County

In 2012, there were twelve candidates for the Republican nomination, one candidate for the Democratic nomination, one Libertarian candidate and one independent candidate.

2012 House of Representatives Election in Texas
Party	Candidate	Votes	%
Republican	Steve Stockman	165,405	70.7
Democratic	Max Martin	62,143	26.6%
Libertarian	Michael K. Cole	2,384	2.7%
Total votes		233,832	100.00%

Candidates in the 2014 primary included Republicans Phil Fitzgerald, John Amdur, Doug Centilli, Dave Norman, Chuck Meyer and Kim I. Morrell, and Democrat Michael K. Cole.

2014 House of Representatives Election in Texas
Party	Candidate	Votes	%
Republican	Brian Babin	101,663	76.0
Democratic	Michael K. Cole	29,543	22.1%
Libertarian	Rodney Veach	1,951	1.5%
Green	Hal J. Ridley Jr	685	0.5%
Total votes		133,842	100%
Republican hold			

2016 House of Representatives Election in Texas
Party	Candidate	Votes	%
Republican	Brian Babin (Incumbent)	193,675	88.6
Green	Hal J. Ridley Jr	24,890	11.4%
Total votes		218,565	100%
Republican hold			

2018 House of Representatives Election in Texas
Party	Candidate	Votes	%
Republican	Brian Babin (Incumbent)	161,048	72.6
Democratic	Dayna Steele	60,908	27.4%
Total votes		221,956	100%
Republican hold			

2020 House of Representatives Election in Texas
Party	Candidate	Votes	%
Republican	Brian Babin (Incumbent)	222,712	73.6%
Democratic	Rashad Lewis	73,418	24.3%
Libertarian	Chad Abbey	4,848	1.6%
Green	Hal J. Ridley Jr	1,571	0.5%
Total votes		302,549	100%
Republican hold			

2022 House of Representatives Election in Texas
Party	Candidate	Votes	%
Republican	Brian Babin (Incumbent)	145,599	69.4%
Democratic	Jon Haire	64,016	30.5%
Total votes		209,615	100%
Republican hold			

=== 2024 ===
2024 House of Representatives Election in Texas
Party	Candidate	Votes	%
Republican	Brian Babin (incumbent)	205,539	69.4
Democratic	Dayna Steele	90,458	30.6
Total votes		295,997	100.0
Republican hold			
