= Dorothy Eisner =

American painter (1906–1984)

- 1937 photo of Dorothy Eisner and Leon Trotsky with her portrait of him
- Born: January 17, 1906; New York
- Died: April 28, 1984 (aged 78); New York

Dorothy Eisner (1906–1984) was an American artist whose painting style evolved over many years from an early, quite personal, version of 1930s social realism, through a period of abstract expressionism, and culminating over the last twenty years of her life in a bright painterly style that critics saw as fluid, masterfully composed, and expressionistic. Throughout her long career Eisner maintained a consistency that a gallerist summarized as derived from European modernism but also grounded in American painting of her own generation and the generation before her. Born and raised in Manhattan, she traveled widely and is best known for the late work she made while staying in a summer home off the coast of Maine on Great Cranberry Island.

== Early life and training ==
Eisner was born and educated in New York City. As a child, she won local children's drawing contests and in her teens attended a school, Ethical Culture High School, known for its arts instruction. Between 1924 and 1929 she studied at the Art Students League where she worked under Kenneth Hayes Miller, Boardman Robinson, and Thomas Hart Benton. During the summer months she traveled to Europe and during one of these trips studied at the Académie de la Grande Chaumière in Paris. She had one additional period of training in the late 1940s when she learned techniques of abstraction and expressionism from Jack Tworkov.

== Career in art ==
When she was not traveling, Eisner lived in Greenwich Village and rented a studio on Cornelia Street. In 1930 she contributed a still life in a group show at the Opportunity Gallery that also included works by Edith Hamlin. (Note: A group of collectors along with the artist Gifford Beal set up the nonprofit Opportunity Gallery in the fall of 1927. Each exhibition was selected by a well-known artist with the overall goal of showing new talent in a wide range of artistic styles. Mark Rothko, Milton Avery, Adolph Gottlieb, and Georgia O'Keeffe all showed at the gallery during its early years.) Throughout the rest of the decade her paintings appeared frequently in shows held by nonprofit organizations, including Salons of America (1931, 1932, 1933), the Society of Independent Artists (1932, 1933, 1935, 1936, 1937), the College Art Association (traveling exhibitions in 1932 and 1933), the National Association of Women Painters and Sculptors (annually, 1933 to 1939), the Pennsylvania Academy of the Fine Arts (1934), and the New York Society of Women Artists (1935, 1936, 1938). (Note: In 1922 Hamilton Easter Field founded Salons of America to give artists an alternative to the Society of Independent Artists whose financial and publicity methods he found objectionable. A reporter said he aimed "to give equal opportunity to every member, whether he or she be a conservative or a post-Dadaist.") In these large shows Eisner's paintings were regularly singled out for praise by New York critics. Thus, for example, in 1936 the New York Post critic noted her "thorough and vigorous" canvases. In 1937 Edward Alden Jewell of the Times called attention to her free brushwork. In 1938, a Post critic called one of her paintings "the outstanding canvas of the show."

In 1932 the Morton Gallery mounted her first solo exhibition. In it, she showed paintings depicting life in the mountains of the Carolinas. Critics responded favorably to the show. A review in the New York Post said she had technical facility and showed her subjects freshly and spontaneously. Writing in the New York Sun, a critic wrote that the paintings were social documents that revealed life in the southern mountains in a way that was "vastly entertaining." A critic for the New York Times noticed that Eisner showed more interest in the people she encountered than in the scenic environment in which they passed their lives and concluded that "she caught something of the characteristic bearing of the Southern mountaineer." Her depiction of a fiddler drew attention in both the Sun and the Times. Late in life, a contemporary of Eisner's, Joseph Solman, said of the social realist style of the time: "We were all seeking the flat, and the exaggerated, and the expressionist in our own romantic, different ways."

Two years later the Delphic Studio gave Eisner and Grace Bliss Stewart a duo exhibition. On this occasion the New York Sun featured a photo of another Carolina mountains painting, "Franklin's View." (Note: Journalist and art patron Alma Reed founded Delphic Studios in 1929. Mainly known for its emphasis on Mexican art, the gallery also showed photographers, such as Edward Weston and Ansel Adams as well as Eisner and other contemporary American artists.) The Sun's critic, who found her work to be on the whole "attractive," used the label "communist" as shorthand for Eisner's social realist style in her mountain paintings. The critic said, "[she] paints citizens who have a good deal of the soil upon their clothes." Howard Devree of the New York Times said the paintings showed increased strength and sureness and praised her use of warm reds in a generally low palette.

Dorothy Eisner, Dewey Commission, 1937, oil on canvas, 25 x 30 inches

In the late 1930s Eisner exhibited as a member of a popular front organization called the American Artists' Congress. After the Soviet invasion of Finland in 1940 she and a small group of like-minded artists quit the Congress to found an avowedly non-political organization called the Federation of Modern Painters and Sculptors. (Note: A group of New York artists formed the Federation of Modern Painters and Sculptors in the spring of 1940. All had resigned from the American Artists' Congress to protest its "Stalinist line" after the congress had endorsed the Soviet invasion of Finland. The federation aimed to be non-political. Its principal goal was to promote artistic independence and its members adhered to no specific style or school of painting. By means of exhibitions, publications, and lectures it set itself to promote the "general interest of contemporary art." In addition to Eisner and her sister Anne, founding members included Isabel Bishop, Ilya Bolotowsky, Anne Goldthwaite, Adolph Gottlieb, Balcomb Greene, and Mark Rothko.) In 1937 Eisner and her husband traveled to Mexico to help the Dewey Commission investigate charges leveled against Leon Trotsky by the Soviet government in the Moscow Trials of 1936–1937. Eisner made a painting of commission members interviewing Trotsky in a house on the outskirts of Mexico City owned by Rivera and Frida Kahlo. The painting (shown at left) contains a view of Diego Rivera who is making a sketch of the scene. She also made two portraits of Trotsky. The two of them joked about a time when she scraped off pigment in painting his face. He made an affectionate, albeit macabre joke that she was beheading him. This painting is shown in the photo of Trotsky and Eisner at top right.

After World War II Eisner traveled widely with her husband. His work as a journalist for Fortune magazine and his passion for fishing helped to determine the locations they visited. In 1947 they spent time on Cape Breton Island and, beginning in 1949 they started to make periodic visits to Livingston, Montana. Returning from Montana in the early 1950s, Eisner began a short period of study with Jack Tworkov in New York. (Note: Tworkov taught art throughout much of his career. In the early 1930s he taught briefly at the Ethical Culture High School in Manhattan. Between 1948 and 1958 he was a part-time instructor at Queens College and Pratt Institute. He was also at one time an instructor at Black Mountain College and in the 1960s taught at the Yale School of Art, becoming chair of the art department in 1963.) In 1960 she and her husband began spending summer months on Great Cranberry Island.

During these years and continuing into the 1970s she continued exhibiting with the Federation of Modern Painters and Sculptors. During this period she also continued to be given solo exhibitions in New York commercial galleries. In 1961 she was given a solo exhibition at the James Gallery and in 1966 and in 1969 at the Cisneros Gallery. This exhibition was photographed by her good friend, Walker Evans, and can be found in the Dorothy Eisner papers collection at Beinecke Library, Yale University. Painting almost every day, towards the end of her life she also held solo exhibitions in New York City at the Ashby Gallery on Cornelia Street in 1980 and 1983.

After her death in 1984 she was given a succession of retrospective exhibitions. These included the Farnsworth Art Museum (1992, "Dorothy Eisner: Paintings and Collages"), Acme Fine Art (Boston, 2005, "Late Expressionist Paintings," and 2009, "Dorothy Eisner on Cranberry Island"), Ogunquit Museum (2008, Cranberry Island paintings), and Gleason Fine Art (Boothbay Harbor Maine, 2017). In 2009 her work also appeared in an exhibition called "The Art of the Cranberry Isles" in the Portland Museum of Art.

=== Positions in art organizations ===
Eisner immersed herself in the art world while still young. In 1930, aged twenty-four, she joined the board of the Society of Independent Artists. Not long afterward she became a member of the American Artists' Congress, the National Association of Women Painters and Sculptors, and the New York Society of Women Artists. She also helped found the Federation of Modern Painters and Sculptors when, in 1940, it split from the American Artists' Congress because of the latter's endorsement of the Russian invasion of Finland and implicit defense of Hitler's position. It seems likely that her marriage, the war, and the birth of a daughter (1942) dampened the impulse to participate in other organizations.

=== Artistic style ===
Dorothy Eisner, Fiddlers' Convention, about 1931, black and white photographic print of an oil painting, 9 x 7 inches

Dorothy Eisner, Yellowstone River, about 1958, oil on canvas, 44 x 36 inches

In reviewing shows of the paintings she made in the 1930s, critics noticed that when choosing subjects Eisner favored people over scenery. Two of them saw these paintings as lively and entertaining social documents having an authentic quality. Others pointed out a muted palette and a tendency to drabness along with strong composition, ability to develop a subject freshly and spontaneously, and overall vigor and thoroughness. For example, a critic for the New York Sun said Eisner painted her subjects "roughly, but with a curious instinct for balance that makes the panels, as a whole, attractive." Writing in the New York Times Howard Devree noted Eisner's skill in delineating subjects convincingly and praised her growing strength and sureness. The painting, "Fiddlers' Convention" (shown at left) was mentioned as typical of her better 1930s work. In 1934 it was reproduced in an article in the Philadelphia Record reviewing the Pennsylvania Academy's 129th annual exhibition.

Eisner's style changed little during the 1930s and war years. During the post-war period, while most of her work remained realist, she began to study under Jack Tworkov. Although much abstract expressionist painting was then anti-figurative, Tworkov, like his friend Willem de Kooning, believed that even so-called pure abstraction made, as he said, "analogy to the figure." His obituary in the New York Times quoted him as saying "Every painter has a subject whether or not there are objects in his paintings." Eisner responded sympathetically to this approach. Later she was quoted as saying, "Abstract Expressionism made me think differently. I learned from it a language of shapes and color that I was not conscious of when I was young." During this period she produced much work in regular visits to the American mountain states, particularly Livingston, Montana, and nearby Yellowstone National Park. Her painting "Yellowstone River" (seen at right) shows the influence of Tworkov's instruction. While it might be taken as a pure abstraction, the title shows it to be an abstract representation of a real place.

Dorothy Eisner, Portrait in Light, 1965, oil on canvas, 25 x 30 inches

Dorothy Eisner, Interior Still Life, 1981, oil on canvas, 24 x 30 inches

In 1960, when Eisner and her husband began spending summers on Great Cranberry Island, her work showed a new figurative style. She often showed people relaxing and engaging in vacation-time pursuits: playing cards or croquet. Just as often her subjects would be inanimate: desks, chairs, windows, a towel rack. Writing in 2008 concerning a retrospective exhibition that showed these paintings, a critic said, "her subject matter is so seemingly mundane that the viewer is startled by her choice." Although abstract, her style was firmly grounded in specific places at specific times, and its realist subjects were clearly evident. She made expressionistic use of bold colors, as she had in her 1950s abstractions, but in a style that critics saw as fluid, masterfully composed, and expressionistic. A critic said the paintings she made on Cranberry Island were orderly, distinct, and painted with great spirit.

An early painting from this period, "Portrait in Light" (shown at left), has a greater degree of abstraction than a painting, "Interior Still Life" (shown at right) made only three years before her death. The latter work seems to show an influence of Matisse that critics saw in her work from the time she spent studying at Académie de la Grande Chaumière in the late 1920s. From its inception in the 1930s through to its culmination in the late paintings, Eisner's output maintained a consistency that a gallerist summarized as derived from European modernism but also grounded in American painting of her own generation and the generation before her.

== Personal life and family ==
Eisner was born in New York on January 17, 1906. Her father was William J. Eisner. He was born in San Antonio, Texas, in 1880 and died in New York in 1975. Orphaned while still young, he left school at 13 and later became one of the first makers of wax paper in the United States. Having moved to New York he was for many years president of a business called the Newark Paraffin and Parchment Paper Co. Eisner's mother was Florine Eisner (1883-1974). Florine's father's name was Moritz Eisner. Born in Austria, he studied to be a chemist and after emigrating to the United States founded a business called Eisner-Mendelson Company that sold a malt extract and other health products. After her marriage in 1905, Florine Eisner's maiden and married surnames were the same.

Eisner had a sister, Anne Eisner Putnam (1911-1967), who followed in her sister's footsteps. She studied at the Art Students League and served on its board of directors. She showed professionally during the 1940s with the National Association of Women Painters and Sculptors and the National Association of Women Artists. After her marriage to Patrick Putnam she lived in the Ituri Rainforest within the Belgian Congo in a campsite adjacent to pygmies of the Mbuti people. Patrick Putnam, who had an unpaid position as agent sanitaire, ran an informal dispensary and anthropological laboratory. For eight years Anne Eisner Putnam operated a small collection of guest houses from which she rented out rooms to visitors so as to support her husband's work. Following Patrick's death in 1953 she returned to New York where she published a book, Madami: My Eight Years of Adventure with the Congo Pygmies, describing her experiences and celebrating the Mbuti culture which she deeply respected.

In the 1930s Florine Eisner (1883-1974) followed the example set by both daughters by studying at the Art Students League. Using Florine Rensie as her name, she joined the National Association of Women Painters and Sculptors and became a professional artist (Rensie is Eisner spelled backward). After he retired from business in the early 1950s, William J. Eisner joined the rest of the family in studying art and becoming a professional artist.

William and Florine raised their family in Manhattan. During the warm months of the year they frequently traveled to their country home in Woodstock, New York, and, after the children had grown they followed the example they had set and both became serious artists. William exhibited under his own name in galleries in nearby Kingston, New York, while Florine adopted Florine Rensie as her professional name to avoid the appearance of capitalizing on her daughters' artistic successes .

Early in the 1930s Eisner worked in New York for the Resettlement Administration. In 1935 she met her future husband, John Dennis McDonald (1906-1998), who was then working for the Federal Writers' Project and in 1936 they married. Born and raised in Detroit, Michigan, he graduated from the University of Michigan with a master's degree in literature and subsequently immersed himself in the socialist politics of the 1930s, particularly the anti-Stalinist left. In 1937 he joined the Dewey Commission as a technical assistant. He and Eisner traveled to Mexico with the commission staff. Chaired by the philosopher John Dewey, the commission aimed to provide Leon Trotsky with a fair hearing of the charges made against him in the Soviet show trials of 1936. While they opposed Stalinism, he and Eisner, like most members of the commission, were not themselves Trotskyists. During the latter part of the 1930s, McDonald worked for the Federal Writers' Project in Washington, D.C. During World War II he worked in New York for a nonprofit motion picture production company called the American Film Center. (Note: Founded by Donald Slesinger, a psychologist and law school dean, and supported by the Rockefeller Foundation, the American Film Center supported producers of educational and documentary films and produced films for the Office of Civilian Defense. Slesinger's inept management brought the center to bankruptcy in 1946.) In 1945 he began work as a staff writer at Fortune magazine. In 1949 he joined its editorial board and remained in that position until he retired in 1971. His writings showed the wide breadth of his interest, including economic theory and game theory as well as fishing and horse racing. The author of scholarly texts as well as journal articles, he was best known for a book that listed him as editor although he was in fact its author: My Years with General Motors, by Alfred P. Sloan Jr. (1964).

McDonald had a daughter, Joan (born 1929), by a prior, relatively brief, marriage with Lorraine Oven. Eisner and McDonald had one child, a daughter, Christie Anne (born 1942), who is the Smith Professor of French Language and Literature and Chair of the Department of Romance Languages and Literatures at Harvard.

Eisner died in New York on April 28, 1984.
