= Hedley Donovan =

American journalist (1914–1990)

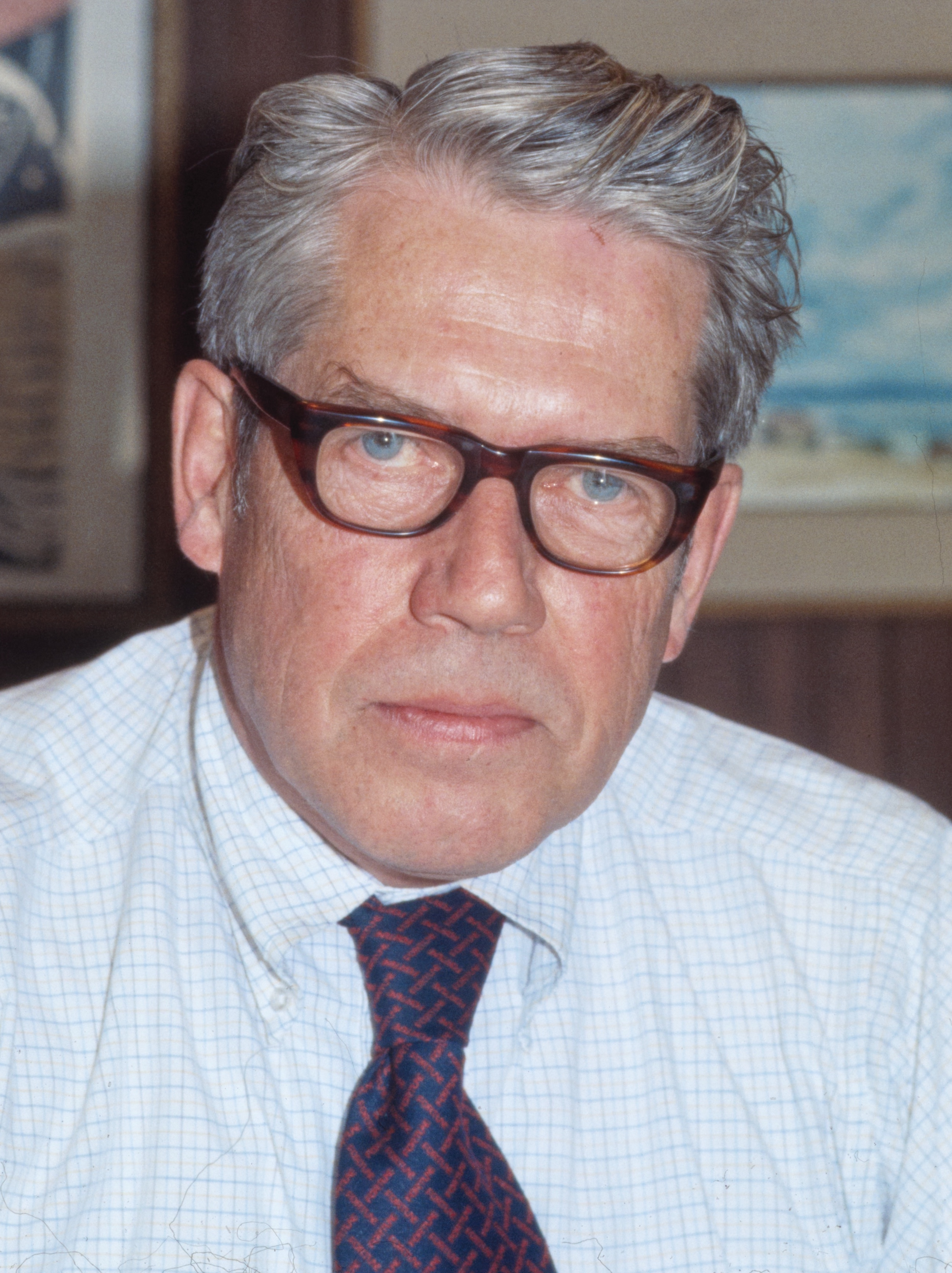
- Donovan in 1978 in New York City
- Born: May 24, 1914; Brainerd, Minnesota, U.S.
- Died: August 13, 1990 (aged 76)

Hedley Donovan (May 24, 1914 – August 13, 1990) was editor in chief of Time Inc. from 1964 to 1979. In this capacity, he oversaw all of the company's magazine publications, including Time, Life, Fortune, Sports Illustrated, Money, and People. Hand-picked by founder Henry Luce, Donovan redirected the magazine from its historically conservative orientation to a more objective editorial stance, particularly with respect to the Vietnam War. The Hedley Donovan Award was created in 1999 by the Minnesota Magazines and Publications Association to recognize individuals who have shown outstanding lifelong dedication and contributions to Minnesota's magazine industry.

== Personal life ==
Donovan was born May 24, 1914, in Brainerd, Minnesota, the son of Percy Williams Donovan and Alice Dougan Donovan. His father was a mining engineer and his mother was a writer. A member of Delta Upsilon, he graduated magna cum laude and Phi Beta Kappa from the University of Minnesota in 1934. From 1934 to 1937, he attended Hertford College, Oxford as a Rhodes Scholar. He married Dorothy Hannon in 1941. They had 3 children.

== Work ==
Donovan initially aspired to be an academic and was offered a $600 graduate assistantship from Harvard University after leaving Oxford. Dissatisfied with the offer, he decided to pursue a career in journalism. From 1937 to 1942, he worked as a reporter at The Washington Post. Following the United States's intervention in World War II, he was commissioned in the United States Navy Reserve, ultimately attaining the rank of lieutenant commander after three years of active service. In 1945, he joined Time Inc. as a writer with Fortune.

Donovan retired as editor in chief of Time Inc. on June 1, 1979, and was succeeded by Henry A. Grunwald. From 1979 to 1980, he served in the Executive Office of the President as a special adviser to Jimmy Carter.

Donovan wrote several books, including a memoir, Roosevelt to Reagan: A Reporter's Encounters with Nine Presidents, published in 1985 by Harper & Row.

== Awards ==
- 1978 Gerald Loeb Memorial Award
