= Jack MacDonald =

Jack MacDonald may refer to:

- Jack MacDonald (communist) (1888–1941), Scottish-Canadian communist
- Jack MacDonald (Hamilton politician) (1927–2010), politician, businessman, and journalist in Hamilton, Ontario, Canada
- Jack MacDonald (footballer) (born 1927), Australian rules footballer
- Jack Macdonald (sportsman) (1907–1982), New Zealand sportsman

== See also ==
- Jack McDonald (disambiguation)
- John MacDonald (disambiguation)
