= Vermont C. Royster =

Editor of the editorial page

Vermont Connecticut Royster (April 30, 1914 – July 22, 1996) was the editor of the editorial page of The Wall Street Journal from 1958 to 1971. He was honored with the Presidential Medal of Freedom. He won two Pulitzer Prizes for his writing, and numerous other awards. Royster was famed for providing a conservative interpretation of the news every day, especially regarding economic issues.

== Early life ==
Although his life began and ended in Raleigh, North Carolina, the parts in between took him to the rest of the world. He was named after his paternal grandfather. His distinctive first and middle names were the result of a family tradition of using the names of states for offspring, begun by his great-grandfather. In addition to his grandfather's unusual name, his great-uncles were named Arkansas Delaware, Wisconsin Illinois, Oregon Minnesota, and Iowa Michigan Royster. They were usually called by their first and middle initials. These names were so unusual that for many years they were printed in the Ripley's Believe It or Not! series of books. Royster's father, Wilbur High Royster, owned and operated the Royster Candy Company in Raleigh, which in the early 1900s sold chocolate, peanut brittle, and other candies across the Carolinas and Virginia. His family also had a strong connection to the nearby University of North Carolina at Chapel Hill; Vermont's grandfather had taught Latin and Greek at the university, and his great-uncle Wisconsin Royster had helped create the medical school at UNC. Vermont was a cousin of bandleader and radio personality Kay Kyser.

Royster was a 1935 graduate of the University of North Carolina at Chapel Hill. During his time at UNC he was a member of the Philanthropic Society and served as the editor of the student newspaper, The Daily Tar Heel.

== Career ==
Soon after graduating from UNC, Royster moved to New York City and secured a job as a reporter for the New York City News Bureau, and a year later began his 61-year career with The Wall Street Journal. His career at Journal was one of steady advancement: reporter, 1936; Washington correspondent, 1936–40 and from UNC 1945–46; editorial writer and columnist, 1946–48; associate editor, 1948–51; senior associate editor, 1951–58; editor, 1958–71; contributing editor, columnist, 1971–96; editor emeritus, 1993-96.

In 1940 Royster joined the United States Navy Reserve. During the Second World War he served as the captain of a US Navy destroyer, the USS Jack Miller, in the Pacific theater of the war. He rose to the rank of lieutenant commander in the Navy. The Jack Miller saw a considerable amount of combat against the Japanese Navy, and survived being caught in two typhoons. In early September 1945, Royster was among the first group of American officers to see the ruins of the Japanese city of Nagasaki, which had been destroyed by the second atomic bomb dropped on Japan. After the war ended Royster resumed his career at The Wall Street Journal.

In 1953 Royster was awarded a Pulitzer Prize for Editorial Writing. He served as president of the American Society of Newspaper Editors in 1965–66. He retired as editor of The Wall Street Journal in 1971 and began writing his popular weekly column Thinking Things Over, which he continued until the handicaps of old age forced him to discontinue it in 1986. He was awarded a second Pulitzer Prize, in 1984, for Commentary.

After his retirement from the Journal, he became the Kenan Professor of Journalism and Public Affairs at the University of North Carolina at Chapel Hill.

== Honors ==
When he was awarded the Presidential Medal of Freedom by President Ronald Reagan in 1986, the citation read:

For over half a century, as a journalist, author, and teacher, Vermont Royster illuminated the political and economic life of our times. His common sense exploded the pretensions of "expert opinion," and his compelling eloquence warned of the evils of society loosed from its moorings in faith. The voice of the American people can be heard in his prose—honest, open, proud, and free.

Other awards he received include Distinguished Service Award, Sigma Delta Chi, 1958; William Allen White Award, University of Kansas, 1971; the 1975 Gerald Loeb Memorial Award for excellence in business and financial reporting; Elijah Lovejoy Award 1976; North Carolina Journalism Hall of Fame, 1980.

In 1976, Royster received the Elijah Parish Lovejoy Award as well as an honorary Doctor of Laws degree from Colby College.

Several of the editorials he wrote are considered classics: "The Desolate Wilderness" and "And the Fair Land" are now The Wall Street Journal's traditional Thanksgiving editorials, and "In Hoc Anno Domini" appears every Christmas.

== Personal life ==
Royster married Frances Claypoole in 1937, and the couple had two daughters, Francis and Eleanor. He died on July 22, 1996, and she followed two years later on April 23, 1998, both in Raleigh, North Carolina. He was 82, and she was 83.

He is a cousin, through the Roysters, of Kay Kyser, a popular bandleader in the 1930s and 1940s.

== Bibliography ==
- Royster, Vermont C. (1962). Journey through the Soviet Union. New York: Dow Jones. LCCN 62052268. OCLC 2809888.
- Royster, Vermont C. (1967). A Pride of Prejudices. New York: Knopf. LCCN 67022219. OCLC 369163.
- Royster, Vermont C. (1983). My own, My country's time : a journalist's journey. Chapel Hill, N.C.: Algonquin Books. ISBN 9-912697-02-4. LCCN 83232385. OCLC 10029654.
- Fuller, Edmund (1985). The essential Royster : a Vermont Royster reader. Chapel Hill, N.C.: Algonquin Books. ISBN 0912697199. LCCN 85001302. OCLC 11728333.
