= Liberty Political Action Conference =

Former annual political conference

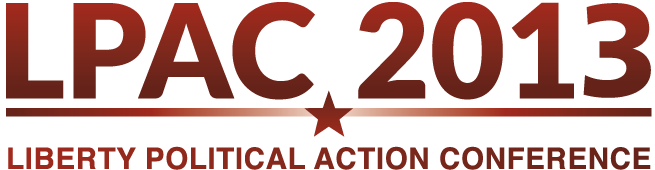
- 2013 logo
- Status: Active
- Genre: Political
- Venue: Hilton Alexandria Mark Center (2014); Westfields Marriott (2012 & 2013); Grand Sierra Resort (2011)
- Locations: Alexandria, Virginia (2014); Chantilly, Virginia (2012 & 2013); Reno, Nevada (2011)
- Country: United States
- Inaugurated: 2011
- Attendance: Around 1,000
- Organizer: Campaign for Liberty
- Filing status: Non-profit
- Website: www.lpac.com

The Liberty Political Action Conference (LPAC) was an annual political conference attended by conservative and libertarian activists and elected officials from across the United States. The conference was held from 2011 to 2014, in various locations.

LPAC was hosted by Campaign for Liberty, a 501(c)(4) nonprofit that is currently chaired by former Congressman Ron Paul of Texas.

== History ==
The first Liberty Political Action Conference took place prior to the 2012 Republican primary season from September 15–17, 2011 in Reno, Nevada. Speakers at the conference included Ron Paul, Senators Rand Paul and Mike Lee, Congressman Steve Stockman, actors Vince Vaughn and Jerry Doyle, and Candidates Chuck Baldwin and Debra Medina, among others.

The second LPAC took place following the 2012 Republican primary season, from September 13–15, 2012, and prior to the 2012 presidential election in Chantilly, Virginia outside of Washington, D.C. Speakers at the conference included Ron Paul, Senators Rand Paul, Mike Lee, Jim DeMint and Ted Cruz, Congressman Justin Amash and Scott Garrett, actor Jerry Doyle, Mallory Factor, and Virginia Attorney General Ken Cuccinelli, among others.

The third LPAC conference took place in Chantilly, Virginia, from September 19–22, 2013. The fourth LPAC conference took place in Alexandria, Virginia, from September 18–20, 2014, but there was never a confirmation of an event held in 2015.

=== Locations ===
	Hosting city	Attendees	Date	Hosting venue
1	Reno, Nevada	700	September 15–17, 2011	Grand Sierra Resort
2	Chantilly, Virginia		September 13–15, 2012	Westfields Marriott
3	Chantilly, Virginia		September 19–22, 2013	Westfields Marriott
4	Alexandria, Virginia		September 18–20, 2014	Hilton Alexandria Mark Center

== See also ==
- Campaign for Liberty
