= Alice Dougan Donovan =

American writer

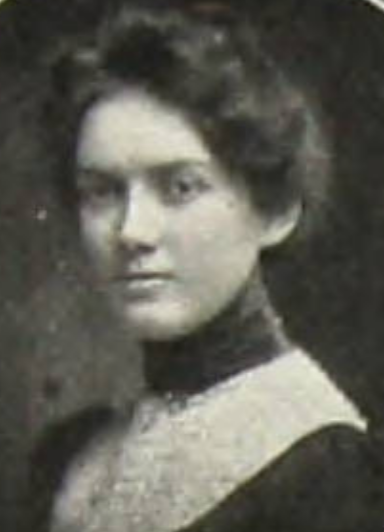
- Alice Dougan (later Donovan), from the 1902 yearbook of the University of Minnesota
- Born: August 16, 1880; Saint Paul, Minnesota
- Died: March 28, 1971 (aged 90); Minneapolis, Minnesota
- Occupations: Actress, poet, writer
- Children: 3, including Hedley Donovan

Alice Dougan Donovan (August 16, 1880 – March 28, 1971) was an American actress, clubwoman, and writer. She taught writing in Minnesota, and wrote poems and plays.

== Early life ==
Alice Dougan was born in Saint Paul, Minnesota, the daughter of Hedley Vicars Dougan and Mollie Knox Dougan. Her father was from Canada. She graduated from the University of Minnesota in 1902. She wrote the song "Sisters Let Us Sing Again" for her sorority, Kappa Kappa Gamma.

== Career ==
Donovan taught school as a young woman. She appeared in three silent films: The Greater Call (1910), Taming a Tyrant (1911), and A Leap Year Elopement (1912). She taught creative writing classes, and wrote short stories, poems, and plays, many of them for school or community use, including Meeting to Music (a "musical burlesque" set at a women's club) and Rummage to Rhythm (another "musical burlesque", set at a rummage sale). She was active in the Minneapolis College Women's Club and in the Minnesota branch of the National League of American Pen Women.

== Publications ==
- Meeting to Music (play, 1933, with Henrietta Kessenich)
- Rummage to Rhythm (play, 1934, with Henrietta Kessenich)
- Music at the Crossroads (play, 1935)
- Miss Westfield High (play, 1940)
- Music on the Menu (play, 1941)
- Ring in the New (play, 1941)
- A Sitter for Sonny (play, 1950)

== Personal life ==
Dougan married mining engineer Percy Williams Donovan in 1910. They had three children, including son Hedley Donovan, who became a noted journalist and editor. They were still married when she died in 1971, in Minneapolis, at the age of 90.
