= Leonard Silk =

American economist

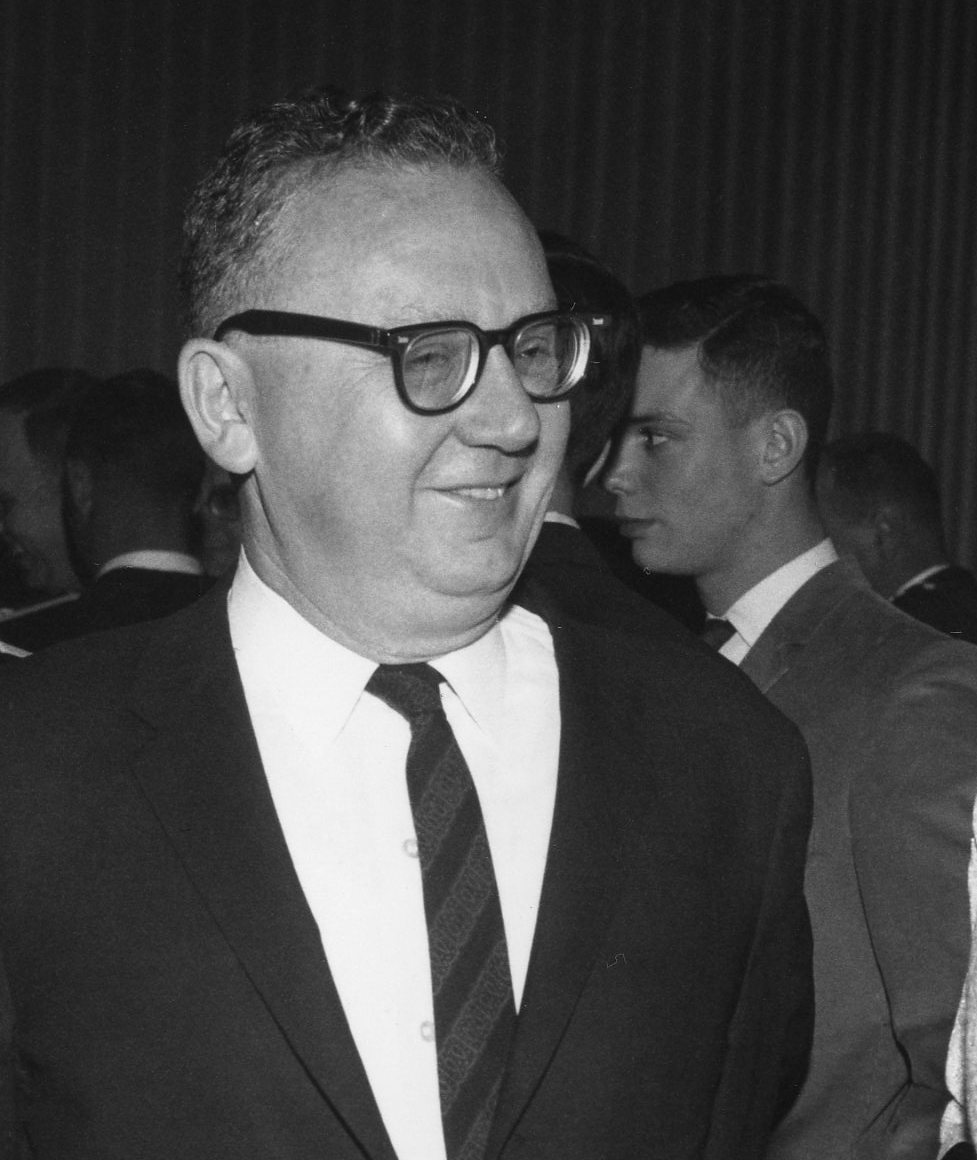
Leonard Silk

Leonard Solomon Silk (May 15, 1918 – February 10, 1995) was an American economist, author, and journalist. Silk's diverse areas of interest included global economics, unemployment, banking, and inflation. Silk wrote for Business Week between 1954 and 1969. He also wrote for the New York Times between 1970 and 1993, first writing editorials, then beginning in 1976, his own column.

Silk was born in Philadelphia, Pennsylvania, and died in Montclair, New Jersey.

== Publications ==
As author

- The Research Revolution. New York: McGraw-Hill, 1960.
- Nixonomics. New York: Praeger, 1972.
- The Economists. New York: Avon Books, 1974.
- Ethics and Profits: The Crisis of Confidence in American Business, with David Vogel. New York: Simon and Schuster, 1976.
- Economics in Plain English. Simon and Schuster, 1978. Revised and expanded edition in 1986.
- Ideals in Collision: The Relationship Between Business & the News Media, with Rawleigh Warner Jr. Pittsburgh: Carnegie-Mellon University Press, 1979.
- The American Establishment, with Mark Silk. New York: Basic Books, 1980.
- Economics in the Real World. New York: Simon and Schuster, 1984.

As editor

- Capitalism, the Moving Target. New York: Praeger, 1974.
- People: From Impoverishment to Empowerment, with Üner Kirdar. New York University Press, 1995.

== Awards ==
- 1961 Gerald Loeb Award for Magazines for "The United States Invents a New Way to Grow"
- 1977 Gerald Loeb Memorial Award
- 1995 Gerald Loeb Lifetime Achievement Award
