= Gerald Loeb Memorial Award winners =

American journalism award

The Gerald Loeb Award is given annually for multiple categories of business reporting. The Gerald Loeb Memorial Award was created in 1974 to honor business and financial writers whose high-caliber work covered a broad spectrum of the profession. The final Memorial Award was given in 1974.

- 1974: Joseph A. Livingston of The Philadelphia Inquirer
- 1975: Vermont Royster, contributing editor and member of the board of directors of Dow Jones and Co. Inc.
- 1976: John McDonald, author and former senior editor at Fortune Magazine
- 1977: Leonard Silk, economics editor at Business Week, then economics columnist at The New York Times
- 1978: Hedley Donovan, Time, Inc.
