= Christie McDonald =

American literary scholar and historian, cultural critic and theorist

Christie McDonald is an American literary scholar, historian, cultural critic and theorist currently the Smith Research Professor of French Language and Literature in the Department of Romance Languages and Literatures, and research professor of Comparative Literature at Harvard University. She is currently a member of the emeriti Faculty. McDonald is the author and editor of numerous books and articles. Her teaching career has focused on the eighteenth century, as well as twentieth- to twenty-first-century French thought in a comparative framework. Additionally, she has published in areas of literature and philosophy, anthropology, feminist theory, and the arts (music and painting).

== Education ==
McDonald received her A.B. at Mount Holyoke College (1964) and her PhD in French at Yale University (1969).

== Career ==
In 1969, McDonald became assistant professor in French Studies at the Université de Montréal, advancing to associate professor in 1977 and Full Professor in 1983. McDonald then accepted a professorship at Harvard University as Professor of Romance Languages and Literatures in 1994, where she subsequently served as department chair between 2000 and 2006. In 2008, she was also appointed Professor of Comparative Literature in the Department of Comparative Literature at Harvard University. Along with her husband, Michael Rosengarten, McDonald served from 2010 to 2017 as Faculty Dean at Harvard's Mather House.

McDonald has been a visiting professor at the École Normale Supérieure (rue d’Ulm), and the Institute of French Cultural Studies at Dartmouth College. She is the recipient of numerous prestigious fellowships and awards, including the Clifford Prize (1994–1995, awarded to the best article regarding an aspect of the eighteenth century). McDonald is a Fellow of the Royal Society of Canada. In 2018, she was named Commandeur in the Ordre des Palmes académiques by the French government.

== Contributions ==
McDonald's publications on eighteenth-century literature and philosophy, and in particular, Jean-Jacques Rousseau from the 1960s to 2010 (from The Extravagant Shepherd to her co-edited volume Rousseau and Freedom), at the cross-roads of literature, philosophy, and anthropology, have focused on the critique of the past and of past assumptions that connects the discourse of the eighteenth century with that of the late twentieth- and early twenty-first century: concepts of equality, freedom and The Social Contract. Her analysis of French women's writing in the eighteenth century (le dix-huitième siècle, 1715–1793, in Femmes et littérature, 2020) brings out the writing strategies and resilience of women writers in a systemically uneven social system. McDonald's contributions to dialogue about deconstruction include publication of The Ear of the Other (1985), originally a conference in Montreal, on questions of translation and autobiography, and Choreographies, a 1981 interview with Jacques Derrida that "make[s] explicit" the connection between deconstruction and feminism.

McDonald's work on art includes Proust and the Arts (2015), where she draws connections between Marcel Proust, Jean-Baptiste-Siméon Chardin, and Gustave Moreau. She has also brought to light the work of two American women artists (from her family's archive) in the cross-cultural context of twentieth-century political and cultural life, in the edited volumes Images of Congo (2005), Painting My World: The Art of Dorothy Eisner (2009), and through her biography, The Life and Art of Anne Eisner: An American Artist between Cultures (2020).

In the context of her interdisciplinary scholarship, McDonald has also worked extensively at the crossroads of music, philosophy, and literature. Her book Dispositions (1986) includes four essays on music, sound, and text in the writing of Jean-Jacques Rousseau, Stéphane Mallarmé, Marcel Proust, and Jacques Derrida.

McDonald's original publications (in both English and French) have been translated into a number of different languages.

== Selected works ==
- McDonald, Christie (2020). Life and Art of Anne Eisner (1911–1967): An American artist between cultures. New York: ACC Publishing Group. ISBN 978-88-3367-100-0.
- McDonald, Christie, published under the direction of Martine Reid (2020). « Le dix-huitième siècle, 1715–1793, » in Femmes et littérature. Une histoire culturelle, tome I : Moyen Âge–XVIIIe siècle. Paris: Éditions Gallimard. ISBN 978-2070465705.
- McDonald, Christie, co-edited with François Proulx (2015). Proust and the Arts. Cambridge: Cambridge University Press. ISBN 978-1107501911.
- McDonald, Christie, with Susan Suleiman (2014). French translation. French Global: une nouvelle perspective sur l’histoire littéraire. Paris: Classiques Garnier. ISBN 978-2812429781.
- McDonald, Christie, with Susan Suleiman (2011). French Global: A New Approach to Literary History. New York: Columbia University Press. ISBN 978-0231147408.
- McDonald, Christie, co-edited with Stanley Hoffman (2010; reprint 2012). Rousseau and Freedom. Cambridge: Cambridge University Press. ISBN 978-0511712098.
- McDonald, Christie (2008). Painting My World: The Art of Dorothy Eisner. New York: ACC Publishing Group. ISBN 978-1851495856.
- McDonald, Christie (2005). Images of Congo: Anne Eisner’s Art and Ethnography, 1964–58. New York: ACC Publishing Group. ISBN 978-8874392209.
- McDonald, Christie, co-edited with Gary Wihl (1994). Transformations in Personhood and Culture After Theory: The Languages of History, Aesthetics, and Ethics. University Park: Penn State University Press. ISBN 978-0271026060.
- McDonald, Christie (1991). The Proustian Fabric: Associations of Memory. Lincoln: University of Nebraska Press. ISBN 0-8032-3150-4.
- McDonald, Christie, editor of English edition (1985; second edition 1988). The Ear of the Other: Otobiography, Transference, Translation. Translated by Peggy Kamuf and Avital Ronell. Lincoln: University of Nebraska Press. ISBN 978-0803265752.
- McDonald, Christie (1986). Dispositions. Quatre essais sur les écrits de Rousseau, Mallarmé, Proust et Derrida autour de textes et musique. Montréal: Editions Hurtubise HMH. ISBN 978-2890457881.
- McDonald, Christie (1985). The Dialogue of Writing: Essays in Eighteenth-Century Literature. Waterloo: Wilfrid Laurier University Press ISBN 978-0889201613.
- McDonald, Christie, editor (1982). L'Oreille de l'autre: otobiographies, transferts, traductions. Textes et débats avec Jacques Derrida. Co-edited with Claude Lévesque. Montreal: VLB. ISBN 978-2890051362
- McDonald, Christie (1973; reprint 2007). The Extravagant Shepherd: A Study of the Pastoral Vision in Rousseau’s Nouvelle Héloïse. Studies on Voltaire and the Eighteenth Century, vol. cv. Oxford: The Voltaire Foundation. ISBN 978-0729401906.
