= John McDonald (footballer, born 1921) =

English footballer

Jack McDonald
Personal information
- Full name: Jack McDonald
- Date of birth: 1 September 1921
- Place of birth: Liverpool, England
- Date of death: 1999 (aged 77–78)
- Place of death: Liverpool, England
- Position: Full back

Senior career*
Years	Team	Apps	(Gls)
1949–1952	Tranmere Rovers	89	(0)
- * Club domestic league appearances and goals

Jack McDonald (1 September 1921 – December 1999) was an English footballer, who played as a full back in the Football League for Tranmere Rovers.
