= John Joseph MacDonald =

Canadian politician (1891–1986)

John Joseph MacDonald (September 21, 1891 - September 24, 1986) was a member of the Senate of Canada from Prince Edward Island.

A farmer by occupation, MacDonald was born and raised in Glenfinnan, Prince Edward Island, but worked for many years in Alberta.

He enlisted in the Canadian Expeditionary Force during World War I and had the rank of lieutenant at the end of the war. He was awarded the Distinguished Conduct Medal in September 1918.

MacDonald served as president of the PEI Dairymen's Association and was also a volunteer board member of the East River Telephone Company and the East River Dairy Company.

A Progressive Conservative, he was summoned to the Senate on the advice of Prime Minister John Diefenbaker in 1958 and served in the upper house until his retirement in 1971. He gave his maiden speech on June 4, 1958.

Senator MacDonald was also appointed with Senator Gladstone from Alberta. After Senator James Gladstone, had given his maiden speech about Bill-24 (Indian Act), Senator MacDonald talked about how he ended up in Alberta and started working for a term as a mechanic at an Indian Residential School with students who were from the Blood and Cree nations. After the war started, he met up with one of the former students also fighting in Europe during WWI.
