= John R. McDonald =

Canadian historian and writer

John R. McDonald is a Canadian historian and writer. He was born in Milton, Ontario, and is a lifelong resident of Halton.

McDonald is a founding member of the Esquesing Historical Society and was awarded the Ontario Heritage Community Recognition Program "Certificate of Achievement". He was recognized for his community efforts and historical research when presented with the Queen's Diamond Jubilee Medal.

He graduated from Ryerson Polytechnical Institute in 1971 and served as a Member of Council on both Halton Hills and the Region of Halton for a 10-year period commencing in 1978.

McDonald has conducted extensive research throughout the Halton area since the early 1970s. This work has resulted in the publication of three books and numerous presentations to churches, schools, service clubs, historical societies as well as walking tours over the past 35 years. His latest book, Halton's Heritage, features the story of William Halton—the man the county (and region) was named for—and deals with the origin of place names for over 70 settlements in Halton.
