= John McDonald (journalist) =

American journalist

John Dennis McDonald (December 5, 1906 – December 23, 1998) was an American journalist, writer, editor, business historian, fisherman, and horse racing enthusiast.

After being a radical Trotzkyite in the 1930s, McDonald joined Fortune magazine's staff in 1945, writing articles and later books about, among other topics, business, economics, games and gambling, and fly fishing.

McDonald's best-known work is My Years With General Motors, the memoir of Alfred P. Sloan Jr., the visionary executive who was CEO of GM from 1923 to 1956. After completing the manuscript in 1959, McDonald entered a strenuous five-year battle to secure its publication, as GM sought to suppress the memoir, fearing it could be leveraged by the Justice Department to launch an antitrust case against the company.

McDonald's long and successful legal battle against GM became the subject of his later book A Ghost's Memoir. Finally published in 1964, the Sloan book became a timeless bestseller, widely recognized as one of the most significant works on business.

McDonald was married to the noted artist Dorothy Eisner. He died of respiratory failure in December 1999, he was 92 years old.

== Awards ==
- 1976 Gerald Loeb Memorial Award for excellence in business journalism
