= John MacDonell (British Army officer) =

Colonel John MacDonell DSO*
- Born: 4 March 1899
- Died: 5 September 1944 (aged 45)
- Military career
- Allegiance: United Kingdom
- Branch: British Army
- Rank: Colonel
- Conflicts: Second World War
- Awards: Distinguished Service Order & Bar

Colonel John Ronald MacDonell, DSO* (4 March 1899 – 5 September 1944) was a British Army officer who served as acting General Officer Commanding 1st Armoured Division during the Second World War.

== Military career ==
MacDonell was commissioned into the 9th Queen's Royal Lancers on 21 February 1920. He was appointed adjutant of the Shropshire Yeomanry on 11 November 1928. During the Second World War, he commanded his regiment during the First Battle of Ruweisat Ridge in North Africa in July 1942. He briefly served as acting General Officer Commanding 1st Armoured Division in North Africa from 19 March 1944 to 24 March 1944. He was appointed a Companion of the Distinguished Service Order (DSO) and was awarded a bar to his DSO on 3 September 1944, two days before he died in action in Italy on 5 September 1944.

== Family ==
He was married to Eldred Mary MacDonell.
