= John MacDonell (political strategist) =

Canadian political consultant

John Edward MacDonell was Past President of the Progressive Conservative Association of Nova Scotia, a lawyer and a political aide to several Canadian political figured. He was the son of Dr. John MacDonell and Mrs. Antonia (Toni) (née Mazerolle) MacDonell and died February 17, 2023, at the age of 56.
