= Deep East Texas Council of Governments =

- Logo

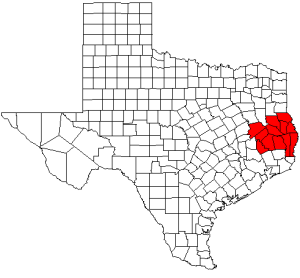
- Map of Texas highlighting counties served by the Deep East Texas Council of Governments
- Formation: 1967
- Type: Voluntary association of governments
- Region served: 9,906 sq mi (25,660 km^{2})
- Members: 12 counties

Historical population
Year	Pop.	±%
2000	320,258	—
2010	342,767	+7.0%
2020	338,090	−1.4%

The Deep East Texas Council of Government (DETCOG) is a voluntary association of cities, counties and special districts in Deep East Texas.

Based in Angelina County, Texas, in Lufkin, the Deep East Texas Council of Governments is a member of the Texas Association of Regional Councils.

== Counties served ==
- Angelina
- Houston
- Jasper
- Nacogdoches
- Newton
- Polk
- Sabine
- San Augustine
- San Jacinto
- Shelby
- Trinity
- Tyler

== Largest cities in the region ==
City	2000 Population
Lufkin	32,709
Nacogdoches	29,914
Jasper	8,247
Crockett	7,141
Center	5,678
Diboll	5,470
Livingston	5,433
