= Jon-Marc McDonald =

American blogger, publicist, political activist (born 1976)

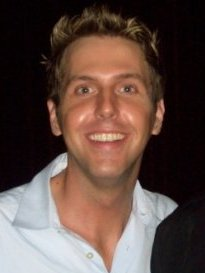
- Jon-Marc McDonald attending the Ghost Town cast and crew party on September 13, 2008, New York City
- Born: September 20, 1976 (age 50); Fort Worth, Texas, U.S.
- Education: Empire State College; Columbia University
- Occupations: Writer, political activist, former campaign manager

Jon-Marc McDonald (born September 20, 1976) is an American-born writer, playwright, political campaign manager and political activist. McDonald gained national attention when, at the age of 21, he simultaneously came out of the closet as a gay man and resigned as campaign manager from the 1998 United States congressional campaign of conservative Republican candidate Brian Babin.

On May 27, 2016, McDonald presented his paper, "Relatively Conscious: the Enduring Rage of Baldwin and the Education of a White Southern Baptist Queer," as well as chaired a panel discussion entitled "Baldwin's Rage and Ethics" at the annual International James Baldwin Conference in Paris, France. The paper was subsequently published in volume 2 of the James Baldwin Review.

In February 2018, McDonald's play, Relatively Conscious, premiered at the New York Theater Festival in New York City. Described as historical fiction, the play centers around the brutal murder of James Byrd Jr., and includes a character resembling McDonald who also resigns as campaign manager from a fictitious congressional campaign.

McDonald is currently pursuing a Master of Fine Arts degree from Columbia University.

== Early life ==
McDonald was born in Fort Worth, Texas to Lyn and John McDonald. He has one younger brother, Grant. McDonald is the grandson of the late James E. Coggin, an influential Southern Baptist minister.

== Education ==
McDonald attended Baylor University in Waco, Texas, where he majored in history. He was the president of his freshman class, an electoral commissions member and served as a representative on the student government. McDonald writes of his college years "Baylor is a really conservative school in a really conservative town in a really conservative state. And I was doing my best at pretending to be a really conservative student with a really conservative girlfriend studying really conservative things. But I had a secret."

McDonald dropped out of Baylor before returning years later to complete his degree at Empire State College (ESC). At ESC, McDonald served for two years as an editor for the school's literary and arts journal. McDonald graduated with a 4.0 GPA in 2017.

McDonald is a current graduate student in the creative nonfiction writing program at Columbia University.

== Political controversy ==
At the age of 21, McDonald resigned from the 1998 United States congressional campaign of Brian Babin, Republican candidate of Texas's 2nd district.

After working on the campaign for three months, McDonald, who is openly gay, abruptly stepped down, citing "irreconcilable differences" with Babin over the issue of homosexuality. According to The Dallas Morning News, McDonald announced his resignation via press release without discussing it with Babin, and his sudden departure left those in the campaign shocked and confused. In the press release, McDonald wrote "There comes a time when your convictions take precedence over your job, your title and your status."

McDonald generated further press coverage when he stated in an interview after his resignation that Babin thought "homosexuals should be shot", a claim Babin adamantly denied. In some press reports, Babin claimed that McDonald was not the campaign manager, but instead a "volunteer coordinator", also a paid position. An article by Hastings Wyman of the Southern Political Report suggested that McDonald was forced to resign by the local media threatening to "out" him.

The resignation received widespread national media attention because of the sensationalistic way it transpired.

McDonald (left) served as a marshal for the large New York City demonstration against California Proposition 8 on November 12, 2008.

McDonald's account of the resignation varies somewhat from the reported accounts. On his political website, Screaming from the Rooftop, McDonald recalls the resignation by cryptically writing in his blog "...after a series of events I resigned from the campaign." Later in the same post McDonald claims that he was "...the youngest campaign manager working on a federal level campaign" in the 1998 United States midterm election cycle and describes his motivation for originally taking the job by writing that he "decided to briefly return to the closet in exchange for the superficial satisfaction of doing something that no one else [his] age was doing."

== Post political career ==
After his resignation, McDonald returned to Washington, D.C., where he lived prior to the campaign. In 2001, McDonald moved to New York City where he worked in communications for the book retailer Barnes & Noble before being hired as the Corporate Communications and Marketing Director for the Hong Kong Trade Development Council (HKTDC). On September 8, 2001 McDonald produced a fashion show featuring Hong Kong designers at New York Fashion Week for the HKTDC.

In 2006, McDonald began Bake It Til You Make It (BITYMI), a culinary multimedia website that, according to the site's "About" page, is "a journey through the culinary world with some political and social commentary along the way." BITYMI also features many videos starring McDonald, four of which are featured as favorites of Bon Appetit. McDonald is a self-taught baker. Many posts on BITYMI are devoted to McDonald's experiments in the kitchen. Allie Demet of The Badger Herald writes that "McDonald is equal parts humorist and baker—he’s smart, snarky, sassy and downright hilarious. But what I appreciate most about him is that he’s a seriously good baker who takes himself and his trade lightly."

On January 7, 2011 McDonald posted that he would lead the publicity and marketing efforts on behalf of friend Michael J. La Rue and the estate of Rue McClanahan for ten auctions to be held throughout the United States to sell McClanahan's belongings as, according to McDonald, was McClanahan's wish. In addition McDonald will assist with the publicity for a documentary about the actress, release date unknown.

On May 27, 2016, McDonald presented his paper, "Relatively Conscious: the Enduring Rage of Baldwin and the Education of a White Southern Baptist Queer," as well as chaired a panel discussion entitled "Baldwin's Rage and Ethics" at the annual International James Baldwin Conference in Paris, France. The paper was subsequently published in volume 2 of the James Baldwin Review.

In February 2018, McDonald's play, Relatively Conscious, premiered at the New York Theater Festival in New York City. Described as historical fiction, the play centers around the brutal murder of James Byrd Jr., and includes a character resembling McDonald who also resigns as campaign manager for a fictitious congressional campaign.

== Personal life ==
In late December 2008 McDonald began a series entitled Angels I Don’t See on his blog, Screaming From the Rooftop. The series chronicled McDonald's personal journey after learning that his civil-unioned partner of eight years had AIDS. McDonald learned of his partners status on Christmas Eve, 2008 while at his partner's bedside at the hospital, a revelation that his partner kept from McDonald for many months.

McDonald wrote of the sudden and rapid deterioration of his partner that he was "watching the love of [his] life waste away from the plague in the supposed non-plague years". McDonald's brother, Grant McDonald, then a junior at New York University's (NYU) Playwrights Horizons Theater School, adapted the writing for the stage and a 45-minute original production, entitled Spotting Love, premiered as part of NYU's 2010 Creating Original Work season and is currently being adapted into a screenplay.
