= John MacDonald (British Army officer, born 1938) =

Rugby union player and army officer (1938–2026)

Major-General John MacDonald CB CBE DL
- Born: John Donald MacDonald; 5 April 1938; Kirkcaldy, Fife, Scotland
- Died: 2 May 2026 (aged 88)
- Height: 5 ft 11 in (180 cm)
- School: George Watson’s College
- University: Royal Military Academy Sandhurst
- Notable relative(s): Mary, née Warrack (spouse)

Rugby union career
- Position: Prop
International career
Years	Team	Apps	(Points)
1966–1967	Scotland	8	(0)

Major-General John Donald MacDonald CB CBE DL (5 April 1938 – 2 May 2026) was a major general in the British Army with the Royal Corps of Transport and a Scottish rugby union international of the 1960s.

== Biography ==
Born in Kirkcaldy, MacDonald attended George Watson's College and played rugby for Watsonians. He was picked in the Scotland team from the London Scottish club and gained eight international caps, across the 1966 and 1967 Five Nations Championships. A prop, MacDonald was adept as a place kicker, although not used in this capacity by Scotland.

Macdonald died on 2 May 2026, at the age of 88.

== See also ==
- List of Scotland national rugby union players
