= Jack McDonald (rugby union) =

- Full name: John Charles McDonald
- Born: 14 September 1914 Toowoomba, QLD, Australia
- Died: 2 September 1983 (aged 68)

Rugby union career
- Position: Flanker
International career
Years	Team	Apps	(Points)
1938	Australia	2	(0)

John Charles McDonald (14 September 1914 — 2 September 1983) was an Australian rugby union international.

A native of Toowoomba, McDonald attended Toowoomba Grammar School and played his rugby for Past Grammars. He gained two caps for the Wallabies as a loose forward in the home 1938 Bledisloe Cup series against the All Blacks and was also on the 1939–40 tour of Britain that had to be abandoned two days after they arrived due to the war.

McDonald, a printer by profession, was the father of Australian rugby league international, Manly Warringah captain and Queensland coach John McDonald. His grandson, Geoff McDonald, became mayor of Toowoomba in 2023.

== See also ==
- List of Australia national rugby union players
