= John Anthony McDonald =

Canadian politician

John Anthony McDonald (December 24, 1875 – December 12, 1948) was a manufacturer, financier and Canadian Senator.

McDonald was born and educated in Shediac, New Brunswick. He was president of Amherst Pianos, Ltd., of Amherst, Nova Scotia and also served as vice-president of Sterling Securities of Halifax, Nova Scotia and Nova Scotia Trust as well as vice-president of the Colonial Brick Company of Amherst and Moncton Underwear of Moncton, New Brunswick.

In 1921, he was appointed to the Senate of Canada on the advice of Prime Minister Arthur Meighen. He sat as an independent until his death. He represented the province of New Brunswick in the upper house.
