= L-class tram =

L-class tram may refer to:

- L-class Melbourne tram, built 1921
- F-class Sydney tram, converted to L-class 1906–1914, converted to L/P-class 1918–1930
