= H type Adelaide tram =

Class of 20th-century tram in Adelaide

Adelaide Type H ("Bay" or "Glenelg") tram
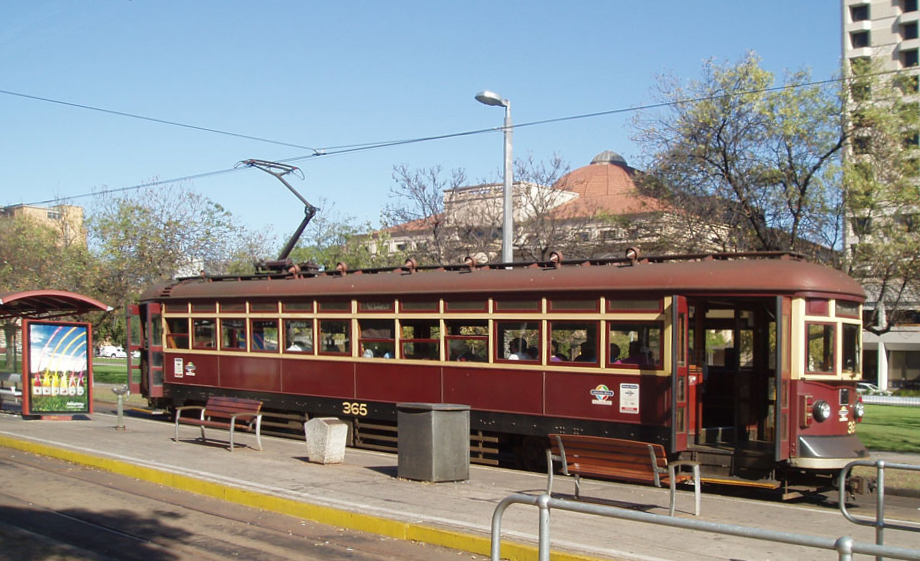
- Tram no. 365 at Victoria Square, Adelaide, in May 2005, 76 years after it was built
- In service: 1929-2006
- Manufacturer: A. Pengelley & Co
- Built at: Edwardstown, Adelaide, South Australia
- Constructed: 1929
- Number built: 30
- Number in service: 0 in revenue service; several now in operation at tramway museums
- Number preserved: At museums: 15
- Formation: Singles or pairs; triple in 1930s
- Fleet numbers: 351–380
- Capacity: 64
- Operator: Municipal Tramways Trust 1929–1974; State Transport Authority 1974–1994; TransAdelaide 1994–2006.

Specifications
- Traction system: 4 x 60hp Dick, Kerr & Co 1089
- Power supply: 600 V DC overhead wire
- Track gauge: 1435 mm (4 ft 8 1/2 in)

The H type Adelaide tram, popularly known as Glenelg tram or Bay tram, was a class of 30 trams built by A. Pengelley & Co, Adelaide in 1929 for use on the newly converted Glenelg tram line. They remained in regular revenue service for 77 years before being replaced by Bombardier Flexity Classic trams in 2006.

== History ==
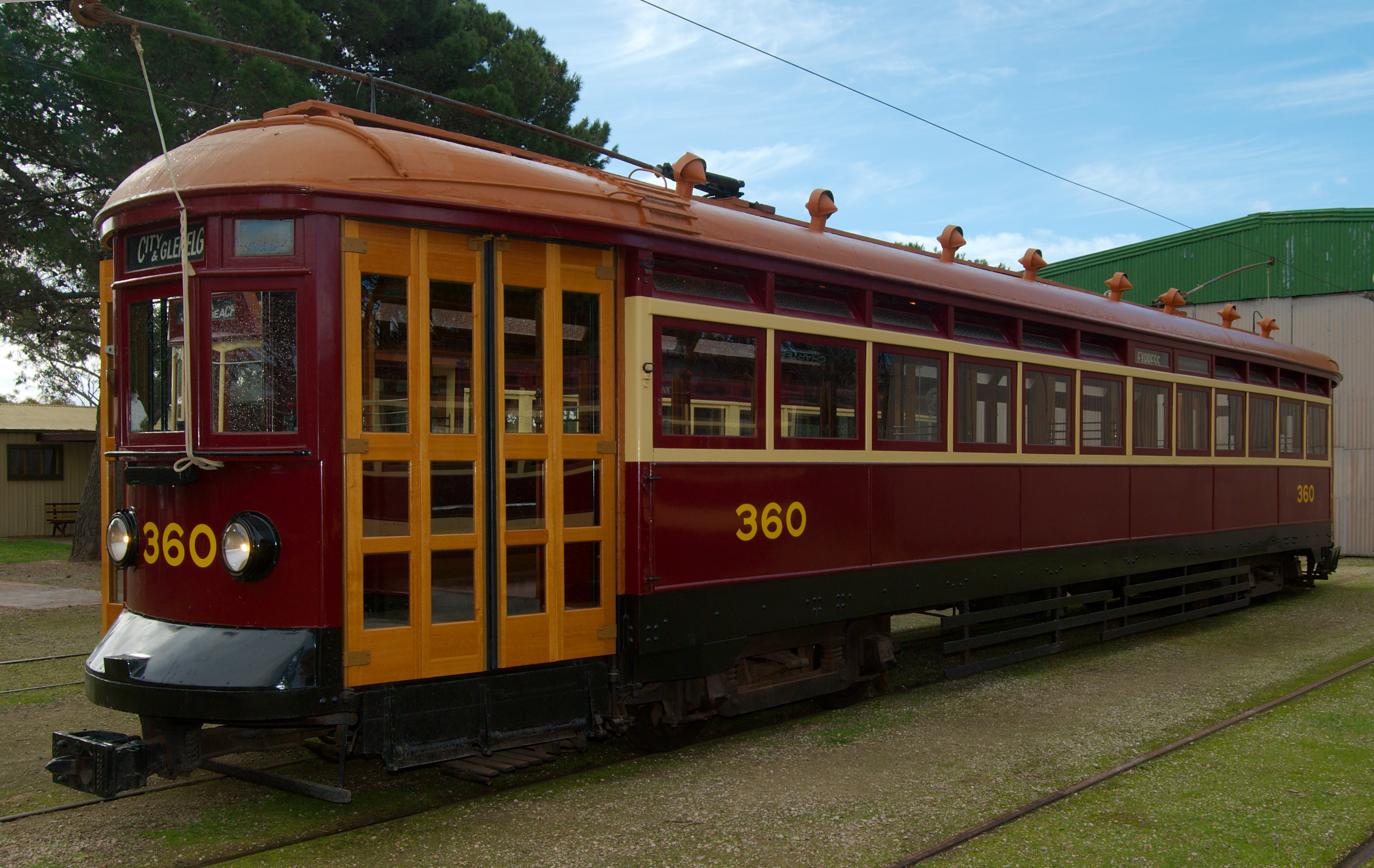
360 in 2008 at the Tramway Museum, St Kilda

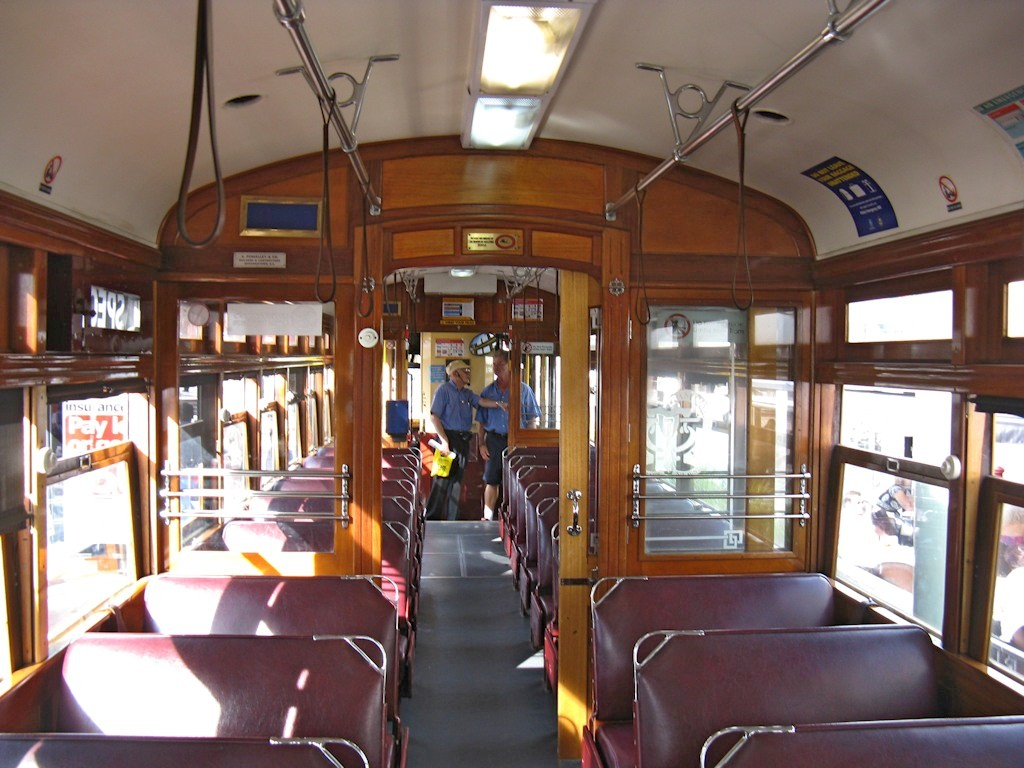
Interior of 367 in 2010

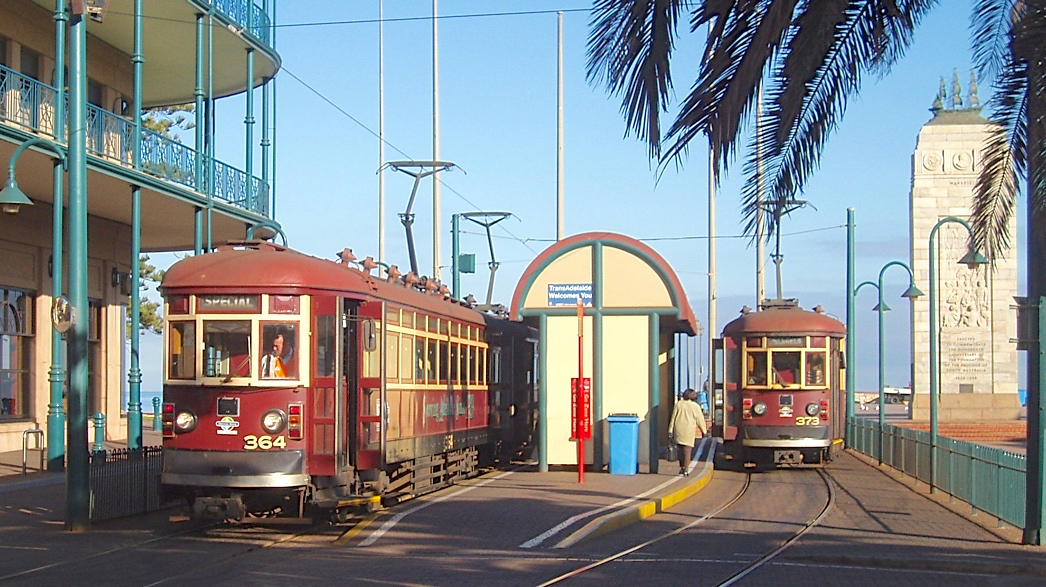
Trams at the Mosley Square terminus on the Glenelg foreshore

The 30 cars (numbers 351 to 380) were designated Type H by the Municipal Tramways Trust; However, "H type" is now in common usage among tramway enthusiasts. They were built in the Adelaide suburb of Edwardstown by A. Pengelley & Co to operate the Glenelg tram line, which opened on 14 December 1929. Previously the line had been a South Australian Railways 1600 mm (5 ft 3 in) broad-gauge, steam-hauled passenger railway line, mostly on a private reservation; conversion was to 1435 mm (4 ft 8 1/2 in) standard gauge and power by overhead electrical wire. They were also used on the Henley North line from 1935 and through to Kensington Gardens after these lines were through-routed (Note: Through-routing: enabling running to the ends of both lines through the Adelaide city centre.) in 1952.

Between 1952 and 1956 all were repainted silver and carnation red, with interiors in Ashbury green. Most were returned to tuscan red, with varnished wood interiors, between 1971 and about 1989. Trams in both liveries are present at the Tramway Museum, St Kilda, South Australia.

In 1968, 366 and 377 were deemed surplus and scrapped. At the time, for operations management reasons all were run in coupled pairs, with an odd-numbered car being coupled to the next even-numbered car. This sometimes required cars to be re-numbered. Thus, for example, 353 and 354 were renumbered 377 and 366 to be married with 378 and 365 respectively. All services were operated by a crew of driver and conductor (driver and two conductors on two-coupled sets).

In 1986, the trams' trolley poles were replaced with pantographs. In 1990, 378 was fitted out as a restaurant car being repainted royal blue with gold lining. On 15 July 2000, 372 was used to convey the Olympic flame from Glenelg to Morphettville as part of the 2000 Summer Olympics torch relay.

Most of the type H trams were replaced during 2006 by new Bombardier Flexity Classic trams. However, five (351, 367, 370, 374 and 380) were refurbished in 2000. By 2012, only 351 and 367 remained; the other three were stored at Mitsubishi Motors Australia's Clovelly Park plant. In 2012, 351 was restored in tuscan red by Bluebird Rail Operations at Islington Railway Workshops. It briefly operated weekend services in August 2013. In December 2013, 352 (renumbered from 367) (Note: The original 352 had been scrapped after a major accident about 1956.) returned from overhaul by Bluebird Rail Operations painted silver and carnation red. The only other recorded use of the pair was in February 2015, when they operated a charter. The final charter run was by 352 in December 2015.

To make room for new Alstom Citadis trams at the Glengowrie depot, in December 2017, 351 and 352 were moved to the Department of Planning, Transport & Infrastructure's Walkley Heights facility. In 2021 they were donated to the Tramway Museum, St Kilda and transferred there as the sixth and seventh H cars on site.

== Characteristics ==
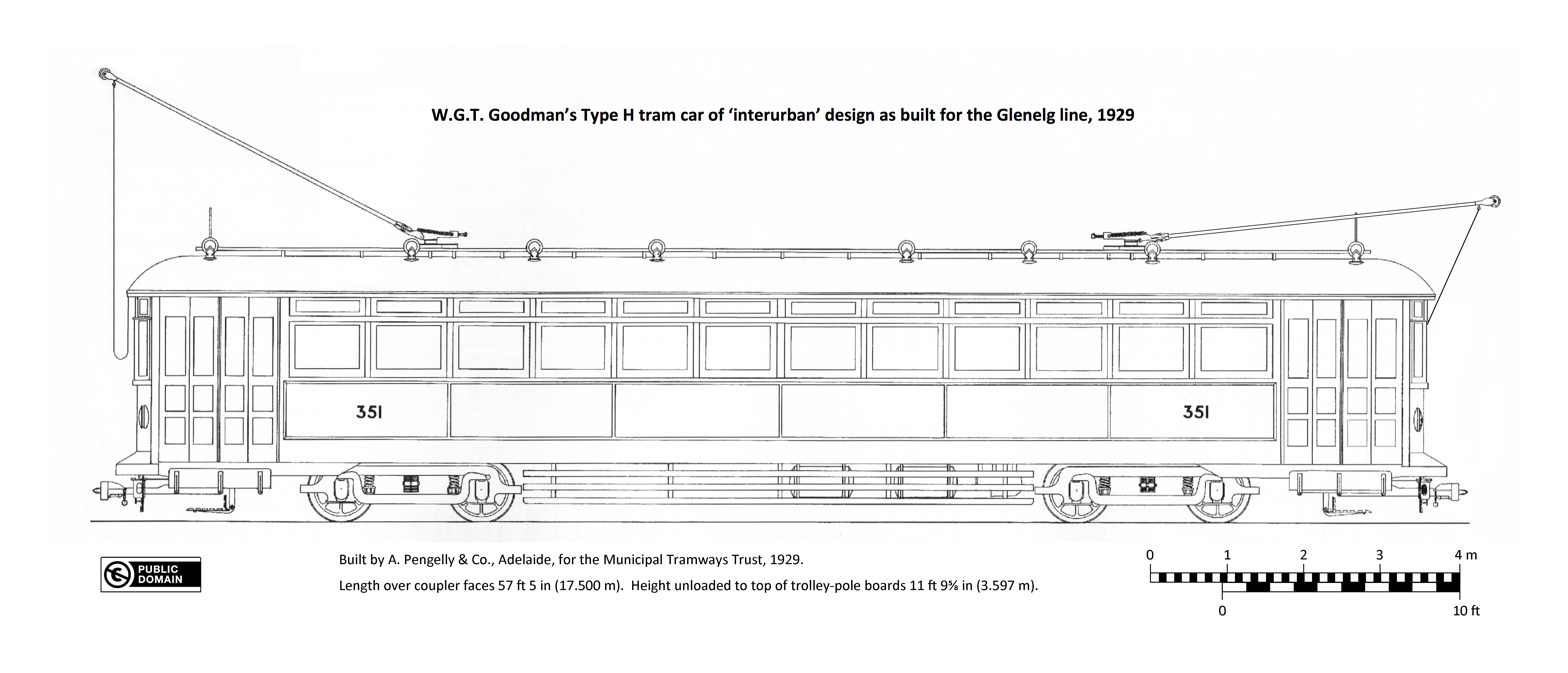
MTT drawing: side elevation of the Type H tram

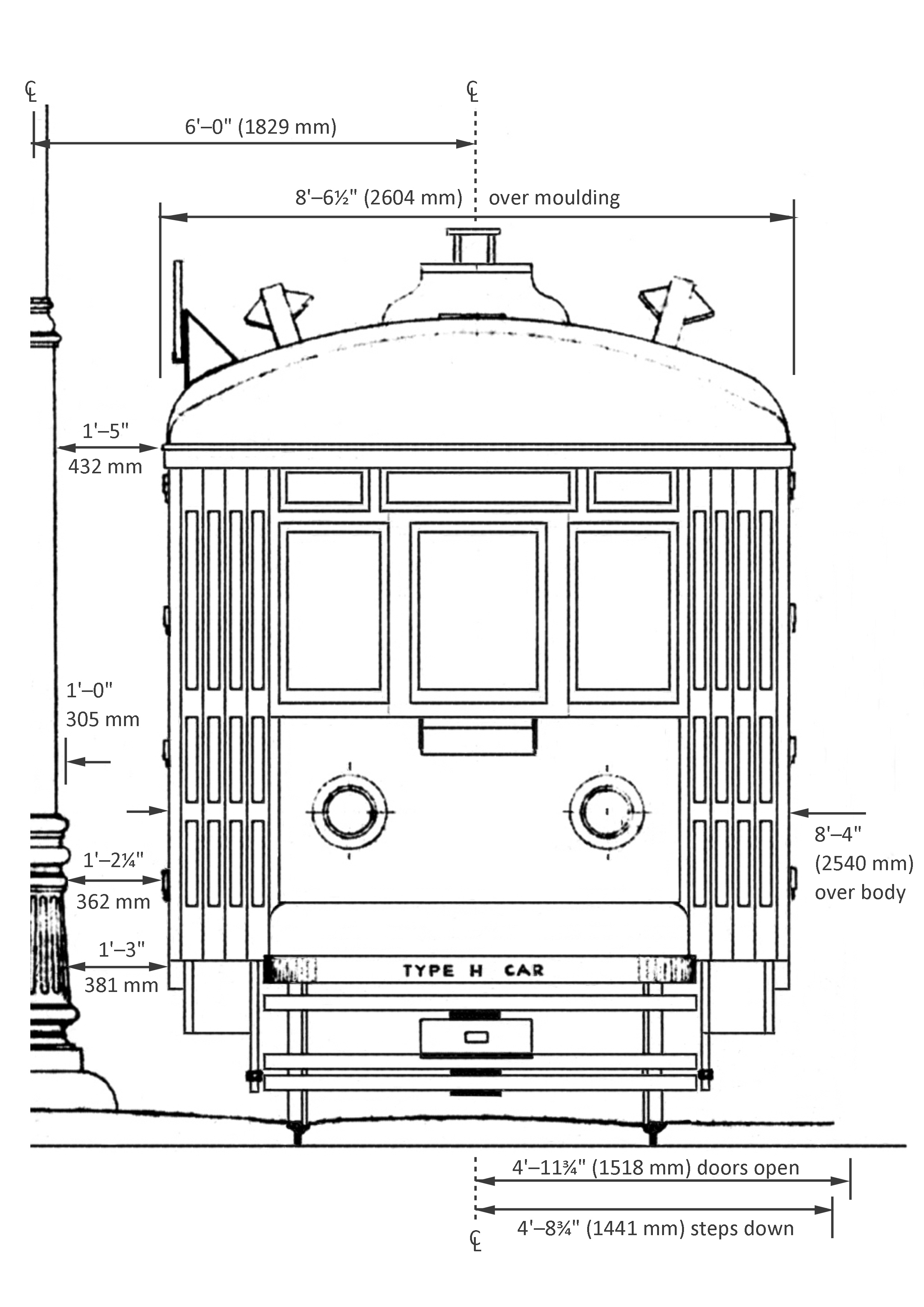
End elevation

Sharing many of the characteristics of North American interurban cars of the first four decades of the 20th century, the cars' period ambience was carefully maintained during their government revenue service. Although they went through several refurbishment programs over the years incorporating updated features such as safety glass, fluorescent lighting and upgraded bogies, they ultimately retained varnished wood and etched glass interiors, a classic tuscan-red-and-cream exterior colour scheme (replaced by Ashbury green in the silver-and-carnation-red scheme but later restored), and neither heating nor air-conditioning in the passenger saloons. They operated in two-car sets and, in the 1930s, as triple sets.

The Type H trams were the longest rigid-body trams remaining in service in Australia, and the second-longest ever built. After the retirement of the W2 trams from Melbourne's network, they were the oldest passenger trams in service in Australia.

== Preservation ==
As of November 2025, 15 Type H trams (half of the number delivered in 1929) were at museums:

Number	Owner	Status
351	Tramway Museum, St Kilda, SA	In traffic
352	Tramway Museum, St Kilda	In traffic
355	Private owner	Not operable, under long-term restoration at the Tramway Museum, St Kilda
357	Sydney Tramway Museum	In storage
358	Sydney Tramway Museum	In traffic
360	Tramway Museum, St Kilda	Operable, on static display
362	Tramway Museum, St Kilda	Operable, stored
364	Tramway Museum, St Kilda	Operable, stored
365	Tramway Museum, St Kilda	In traffic
368	Tramway Museum Society of Victoria	Stored
371	Perth Electric Tramway Society	Stored, under restoration
372	Perth Electric Tramway Society	Operable but yet to enter traffic
373	Tramway Museum Society of Victoria	On static display
374	Old Tailem Town Pioneer Village	On static display
378	Tramway Museum, St Kilda	Operable, on static display (former restaurant car)

== In popular culture ==
Nos 351 and 378 can be seen in the music video to Taiwanese pop singer Amber Fang's 1990 single "Ai qing de gu shi" (Love Story), which was filmed in Adelaide.
