= Tramway Museum Society of Victoria =

Tramway Heritage Centre
- Established: 1962
- Location: Bylands, Victoria, Australia
- Coordinates: 37.353541°S 144.966356°E
- Type: Tramway museum
- Collection size: 53
- Website: tramway.org.au

The Tramway Museum Society of Victoria Incorporated (TMSV) owns a large collection of trams from Melbourne, Ballarat, Geelong, Adelaide, and Sydney as well as preserved buses and other work vehicles.

== History ==
The TMSV was founded in 1962 with the aim of establishing an operational tramway museum. One of the main reasons for founding the museum was the belief that Melbourne would follow the other cities in Australia and abandon its tram system. In 1970, the former stationmaster's residence at Bylands was purchased. The surrounding railway precinct was leased the following year with the goal of establishing a transport museum. The lease was purchased outright in the mid-1980s.

The museum has 1 km (0.6 mi) of track which was previously a part of the Heathcote Junction to Bendigo railway line. The museum initially operated a horse tramway, using restored and recreated horse tramway carriages. The track was eventually electrified and electric trams began running in June 1982. They operated until 2009, after which the "Tramway Heritage Centre" has operated as a static museum only.

The Tramway Heritage Centre has a tramway electric supply substation, two running sheds, various buildings for the storage of un-restored trams, cable tram cars, motor vehicles and a visitors centre. There is an exhibition shed/workshop which was used during the Melbourne International Exhibition of 1880

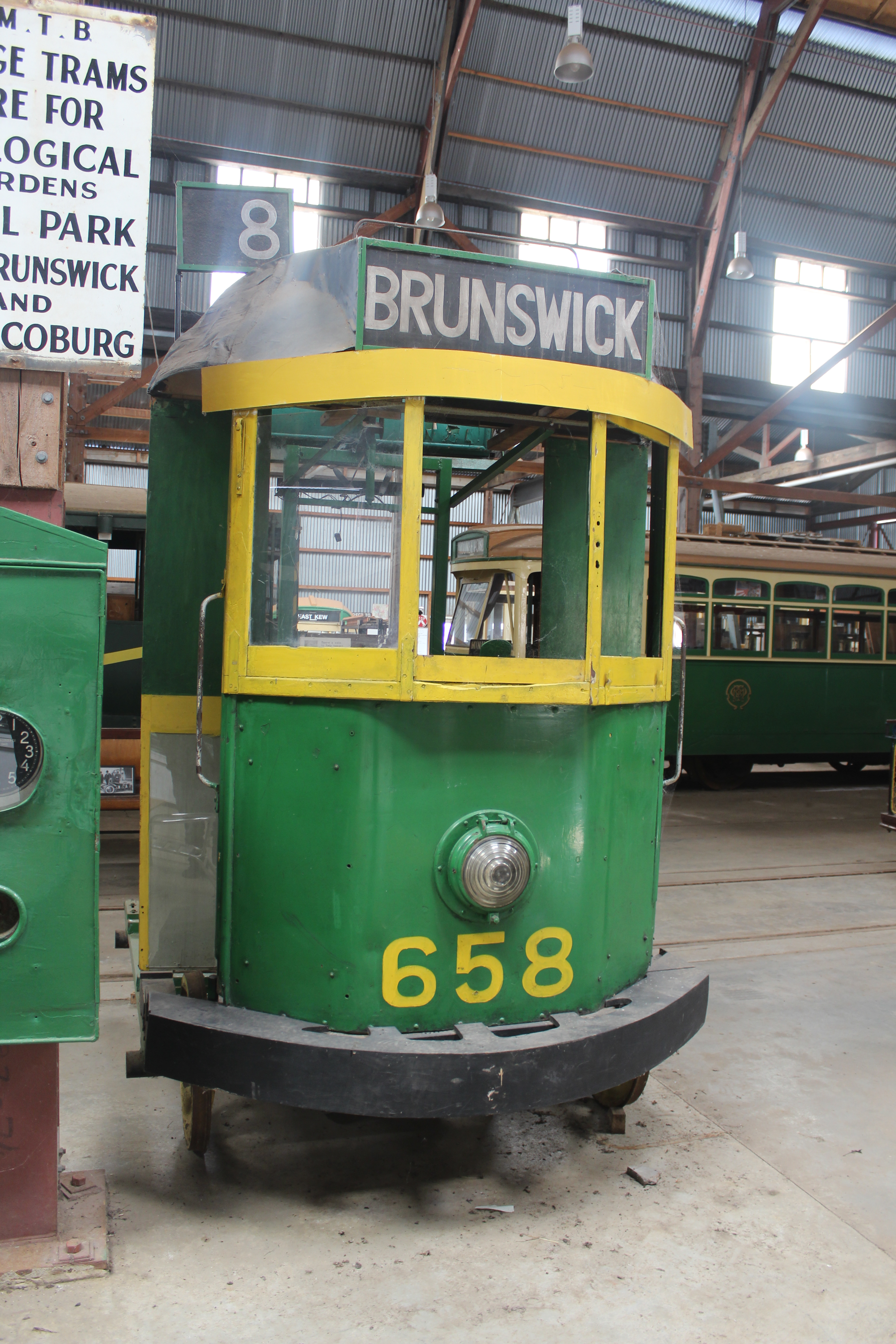
"Malcolm Tram" used in the movie "Malcolm"

== List of trams ==
MMTB Trams

L 101, W 220, W1 427, W2 509, W2 568, W2 643, SW2 644, W2 646, W2 650, W3 667, W4 673, SW5 739, W5 782, W5 795, SW5 840, SW6 887, SW6 902, W6 996, W7 1001, X1 467, X2 680, Y 612, Z1 5, PCC 980, Malcolm tram from the movie Malcolm

MMTB works trams

Grinder 1, Bogie tank car 7, Scrubber car 10 (Ex Sydney K 763), Sleeper transport car 15 (Ex Q class 198), Ballast trailer 24

Other Victorian Trams

Prahran & Malvern No. 46, Victorian Railways No.34, Victorian Railways No.52, Ballarat 17, Ballarat 23, Ballarat 36, Geelong 9, Geelong 22, Geelong 40

Interstate trams

Adelaide H 368, Adelaide H 373, Sydney R 1845,

== Publications ==
The Tramway Museum Society of Victoria publishes a quarterly newsletter, Running Journal.
