= L class Melbourne tram =

L-class
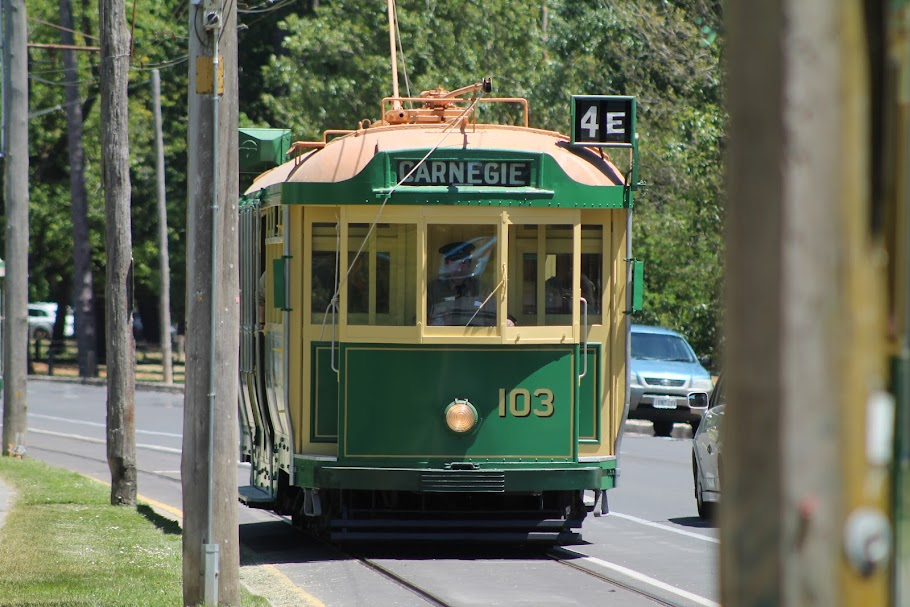
- Manufacturers: James Moore & Sons
- Assembly: South Melbourne
- Constructed: 1921
- Number built: 6
- Fleet numbers: 101-106
- Capacity: 56 (as built); 48 (as modified)

Specifications
- Car length: 13.87 m (45 ft 6 in)
- Width: 2.78 m (9 ft 1 in)
- Height: 3.21 m (10 ft 6 in)
- Wheel diameter: 673 mm (26.5 in) (as built); 711 mm (28.0 in) (as rebuilt)
- Weight: 17.9 tonnes
- Current collection: Trolley pole
- Bogies: JG Brill Company 77E
- Track gauge: 1,435 mm (4 ft 8 1/2 in)

The L-class was a class of six trams ordered from James Moore & Sons by the Prahran & Malvern Tramways Trust (PMTT). However, by the time they were delivered in 1921, the PMTT had been taken over by the Melbourne & Metropolitan Tramways Board (MMTB).

In 1934 they were modified with the four narrow doors replaced with two wider doors, and new drivers cabins fitted. When introduced they were considered too fast and re-geared. The ratios were restored in the early 1950s, with the W-class having replaced many of the older trams. They were withdrawn from regular service in 1969, but remained available as backups until the early 1980s.

Two (104 and 106) were overhauled in 1981 for use on a Sundays only service from Elizabeth Street to Melbourne Zoo being based at Essendon depot. To allow for new Z-class trams to reuse the numbers, 104 and 106 were renumbered 1104 and 1106 on paper, although continued to display their original numbers. In 1982, both were repainted in MMTB chocolate and cream for use in the film Squizzy Taylor.

== Preservation ==
Four have been preserved:

- 101 by the Tramway Museum Society of Victoria
- 103 by the Melbourne Tramcar Preservation Association
- 104 as part of the VicTrack heritage fleet at Hawthorn
- 106 as part of the VicTrack heritage fleet at Hawthorn
