= Trams in Fremantle =

Tram network in Fremantle, Western Australia

Fremantle Municipal Tramways
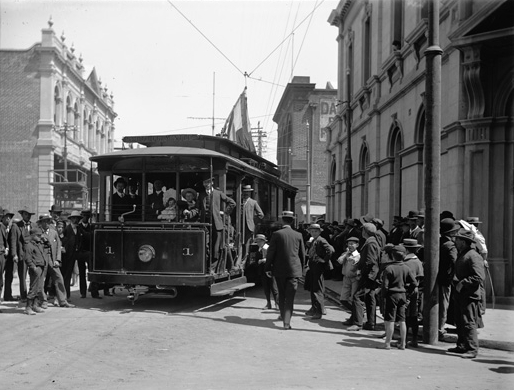
- Fremantle Municipal Tramways opening day, 30 October 1905

Operation
- Locale: Fremantle, Western Australia
- Open: 30 October 1905
- Close: 8 November 1952
- Status: Closed
- Routes: 6
- Owners: Fremantle Municipal District; (1905–1952) (main network); East Fremantle Municipality; (1905–1952) (main network); North Fremantle Municipality; (1908–1938) (N Ftle line); Melville Roads Board; (1915–1928) (Melville lines)
- Operators: Fremantle Municipal Tramways and Electric Lighting Board; (1905–1952) (main network); North Fremantle Municipality; (1908–1938) (N Ftle line); Melville Roads Board (1915–1928) (Melville lines); Fremantle Municipal Tramways and Electric Lighting Board; (1928–1952) (Melville lines)

Infrastructure
- Track gauge: 3 ft 6 in (1,067 mm)
- Propulsion system: Electricity
- Electrification: Overhead catenary
- Depot: High Street

Statistics
Overview
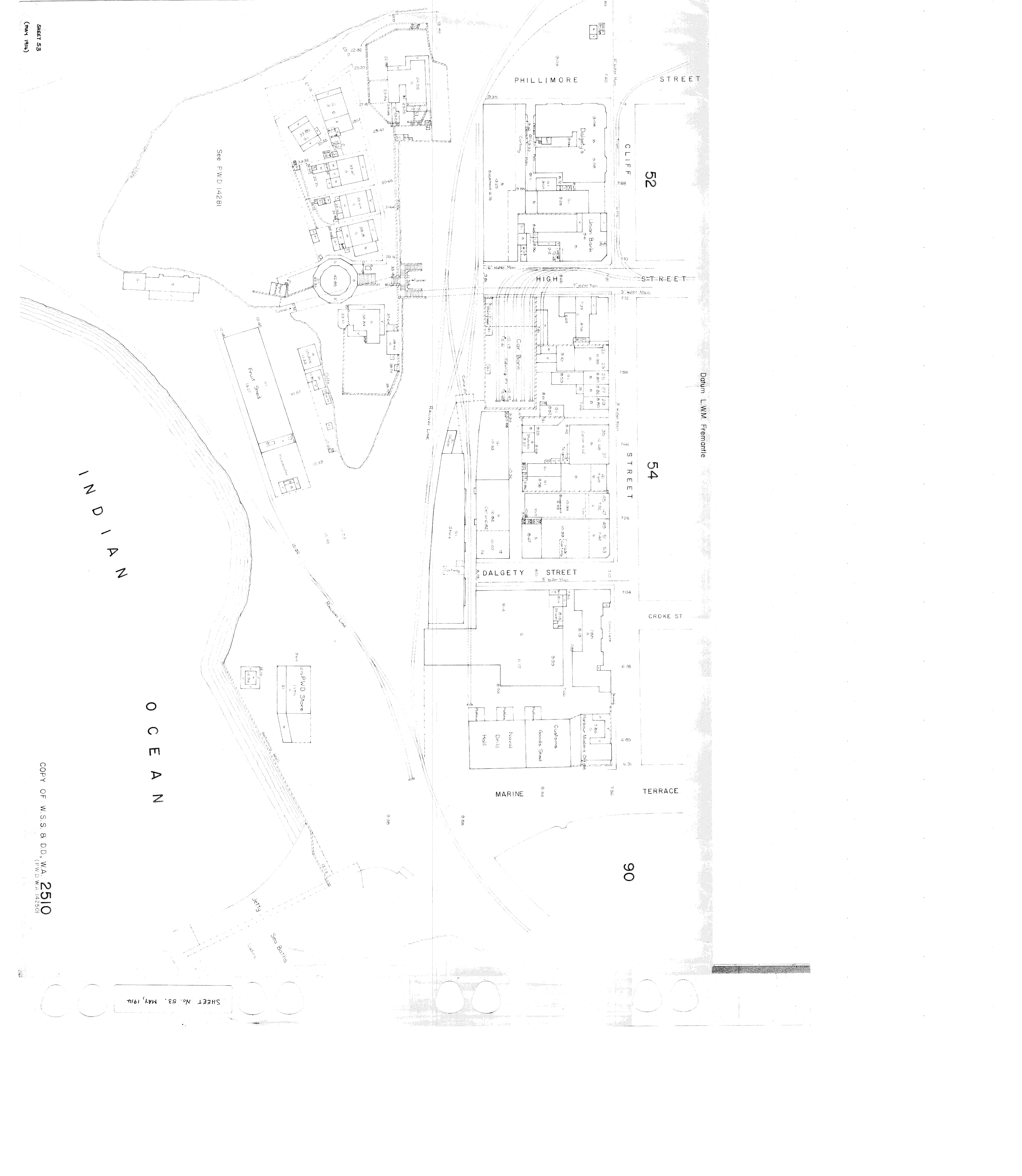
1914 map of Arthur Head area shows the Tram Workshops on High Street, including the tracks

The Fremantle tramway network linked the central business district of Fremantle, the port city for Perth, Western Australia, with nearby suburbs. Small but comprehensive, it operated between 1905 and 1952. It was not connected with the larger Perth tramway system.

== History ==
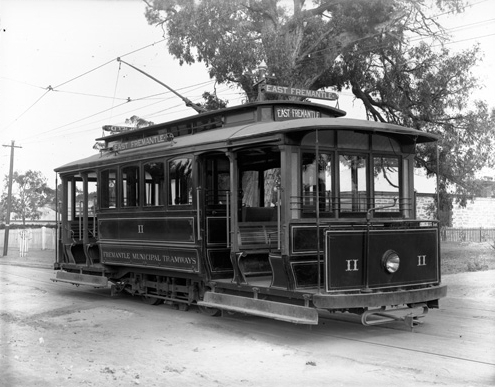
Tram no 11, 1906

The Fremantle Municipal Tramways (FMT) began operations on 30 October 1905. Prior to that date, there was no public transport system in Fremantle. The tram network expanded into North Fremantle in 1908, and into Melville in 1915. The North Fremantle line closed in 1938 and was replaced by diesel buses. The rest of the network reached its peak usage during World War II.

After World War II, the system operated quite profitably for the council. However, the decision of the Government of Western Australia to nationalise the south-west electricity systems from private and council ownership to the newly formed State Electricity Commission of Western Australia in the early 1950s meant that the price of power to the trams increased markedly, to the extent that supply was extremely costly to the council.

As a result, and without any fanfare at all, the whole system was closed after the last tram ran into the Carbarn in Queen Victoria Street on 8 November 1952. The last Fremantle tram left the town on the back of a semi-trailer in March the following year.

== Services ==
=== The original network ===
By the time Fremantle's tram network was fully operational in April 1906, it had four lines.

==== South (Route S) ====
High Street, via city loop (Phillimore Street), South Terrace and Mandurah Road (now part of South Terrace) to Douro Road, South Fremantle.

A combination of business and pleasure, this line connected central Fremantle with the South Beach foreshore. During the week, the South line served commuters heading towards Fremantle, and on summer weekends, people would travel from Perth and further afield to take the South line to South Beach.

From 1907, the line included a short "city loop", running past the relocated Fremantle railway station in Phillimore Street. In 1923, the facilities at South Beach were significantly expanded, with the opening of a Hydrodome. The South line remained open until the whole network was closed in 1952.

==== East (Route E) ====
High Street, Fremantle, via Adelaide Street and Canning Road (now Canning Highway) to Allen Street, East Fremantle.

In 1909, this line was extended from Allen Street to Petra Street, on the border between East Fremantle and Palmyra. On 15 December 1915, the Melville Roads Board opened a further extension along Canning Road, this time to the corner of Stock Road, Bicton.

==== Marmion (Route M) ====
High Street, Fremantle, via Marmion Street to Duke Street, Marmion (now East Fremantle).

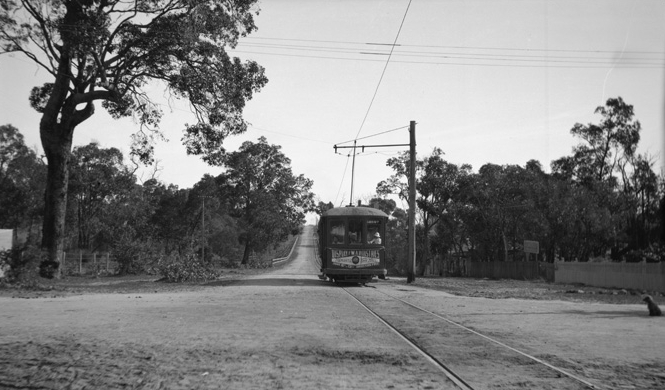
Route M tram on High Street bound for Carrington Street, c. 1923

In 1908, this line was extended from Duke Street along Marmion Street in an easterly direction, and then south to High Street, where it continued east to a new terminus at the Fremantle Cemetery, Carrington Street, East Fremantle.

The line along Marmion Street was also later extended to McKimmie Street, Palmyra.

==== Beaconsfield (Route B) ====
High Street, Fremantle, via Hampton Street (now Hampton Road) to Beaconsfield public school, cnr Lefroy Road, Beaconsfield.

This line was later extended from Beaconsfield public school along Hampton Street, Wray Avenue and South Street to Central Avenue, and subsequently to Carrington Street, Beaconsfield. It was closed in 1948.

=== Additional routes ===
==== North (Route N) ====
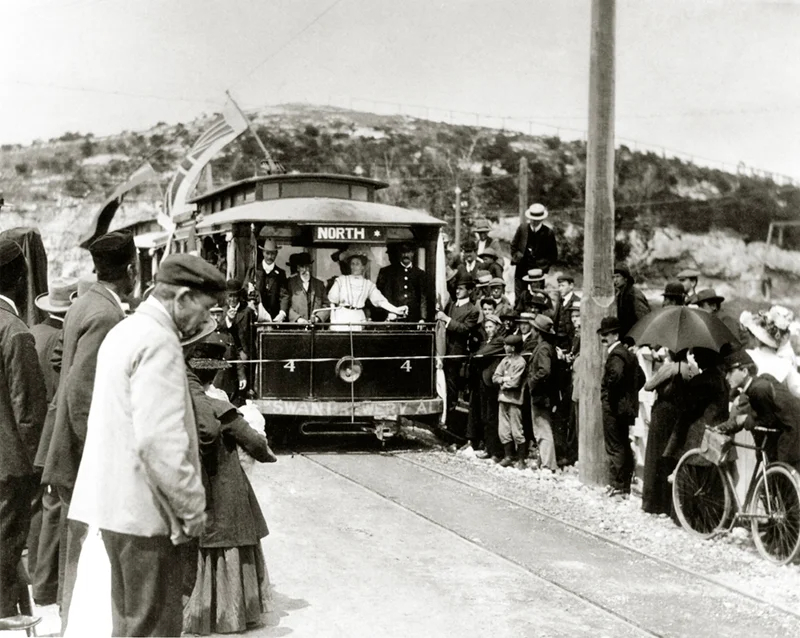
North Fremantle's first tram, 1908

High Street, Fremantle, via Adelaide Street, the Swan River Bridge and the Perth-Fremantle Road (now Stirling Highway) to Leighton Street (now Leslie Road), North Fremantle.

On 30 September 1908, a new route to North Fremantle was added to the network. The North Fremantle route was owned and operated by the North Fremantle Municipality. It did not enjoy the same success as the original network, and was closed on 30 November 1938.

==== Point Walter ====
Canning Road, Bicton, via Point Walter Road, to Point Walter reserve, Bicton.

On 15 December 1915, simultaneously with its opening of the extension of the East line to Stock Road, Bicton, the Melville Roads Board opened a second new route, to Point Walter in Bicton. The opening of this route helped to develop Point Walter into a popular resort and place of entertainment. Along with the trams came electric lighting, and, soon afterwards, well patronised shops and restaurants. Entertainment at Point Walter included McNamara's Band. There were also panoramic views of the Swan River, frequently dotted with the sails of racing yachts.

Over time, increasing numbers of motor car owners chose to seek entertainment further away from Fremantle than Point Walter. As a result, the Point Walter resort fell into disrepair, and patronage on the Point Walter line declined. In 1939, the line was closed.

== Fleet ==
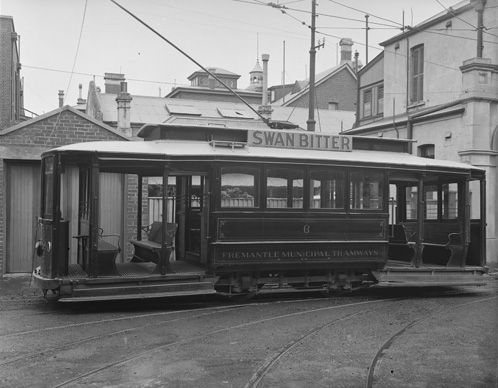
Tram no 6, c 1930

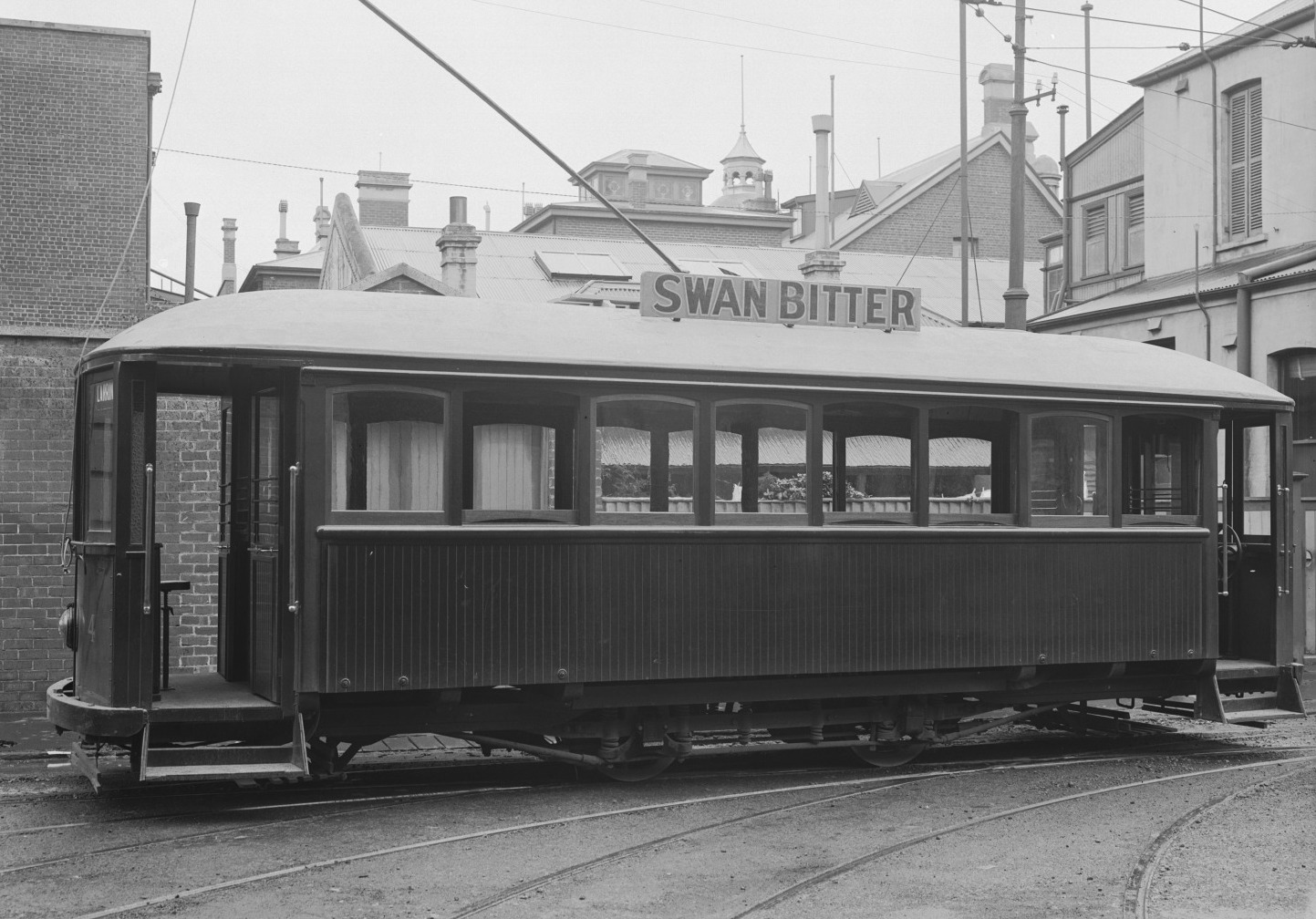
Tram no 4 as rebuilt, c 1930

A total of 36 trams entered service on the Fremantle tram network between 1905 and 1939. Most of them remained in service until 1949 or later.

Unlike their Perth counterparts, the various classes of Fremantle tram were not officially allocated any class designator code. Each individual Fremantle tram was officially identified only by its unique number. Most Fremantle trams fell into two main classes, with a small transitional group in between.

The first main Fremantle tram class, made up of tramcars 1 to 19, 24 and 25, was of single truck, drop end, open California combination tram cars. They entered service between 1905 and 1914. Three of them, tramcars 7, 4 and 11, were converted in 1920–21 into single truck saloon cars.

Tramcars 20 to 23 were the transitional group. Each of them entered service between 1912 and 1915. The first three of this group were single truck, drop-end, closed combination cars. The fourth one was initially an open cross-bench car; in 1933–34, the FMT converted it into a bogie saloon car.

The second main class of Fremantle tram was made up of tramcars 26 to 36. They were built and served as bogie saloon cars, and entered service between 1921 and 1939.

The trams were manufactured by J.G. Brill Company in the United States (nos. 1–14 and 17–19) and locally by Westralia Ironworks (nos. 15–16), Boltons (nos. 20–25 and 30–32) the Midland Railway Workshops (26–29), and the FMT (nos. 33–36).

The dominant colour in the livery of every Fremantle tram was a shade of maroon. The single truck tramcars were also lined with pinstripes, and the bogie trams also painted a cream colour at window level.

== Preserved trams ==
Fremantle's trams 14, 28, 29, 30 and 36 have been preserved by the Perth Electric Tramway Society at its heritage tramway in Whiteman Park.

== Sources ==
- Perth Bus Info (2004). "Other WA Tramways – Fremantle Municipal Tramways". Perth Bus Info.
- Chalmers, John (2001). A Ticket to Ride : A History of the Fremantle Municipal tramways. Mt Lawley, WA: Perth Electric Tramway Society Inc. ISBN 978-0-9578257-0-3.
- Jones, Colin (1993). Watch for Trams. Kenthurst, N.S.W: Kangaroo Press. ISBN 0-86417-544-2.
- Perth Electric Tramway Society; Brown, David (1999a). "Perth Electric Tramway Society – Fremantle Trams". Perth Electric Tramway Society.
- Perth Electric Tramway Society; Brown, David (1999b). "Perth Electric Tramway Society – Tramcar Collection". Perth Electric Tramway Society.
