= Melbourne Tramcar Preservation Association =

- Established: 1974
- Location: Haddon, Victoria, Australia
- Type: Tramway museum
- Website: www.mtpa.com.au

The Melbourne Tramcar Preservation Association is a tram preservation society in Haddon, Victoria, Australia.

== History ==
The Melbourne Tramcar Preservation Association was established 1974 as the Haddon Tramway Workshops. Its first purchase was a former Ballarat tram. It subsequently purchased a number of trams from the Melbourne & Metropolitan Tramways Board (M&MTB) and one former Victorian Railways tram.

A 35 by 14 metres shed was completed in 1979. For a time it also owned an ex M&MTB AEC Regal III and two Leyland OPS1s buses. The Melbourne Tramcar Preservation Association was incorporated in May 1984. A 650-metre demonstration track was opened in November 2000.

== Museum ==
The museum, which opened to visitors on a regular basis in the late 1990s, allows visitors to see the collection of historic trams as well as have a behind the scenes look at the restoration process. It includes a 650m full-scale track on which operate W class trams that were part of Melbourne's public transportation system. The space is occasionally used for artists who want to encompass tramcars in their work. The museum's first purchase was a former Ballarat tram. It subsequently purchased a number of trams from the Melbourne & Metropolitan Tramways Board (M&MTB) and one former Victorian Railways tram. Six of the museum's eight cars are fully functional, including a restored "rescue car".

== Collection ==
Collection
Class	No	Manufacturer	Operator	Year	Refs
L	103	James Moore & Sons	Melbourne & Metropolitan Tramways Board	1921
W2	357	Preston Workshops	Melbourne & Metropolitan Tramways Board	1926
W2	407	Preston Workshops	Melbourne & Metropolitan Tramways Board	1926
W3	663	Preston Workshops	Melbourne & Metropolitan Tramways Board	1933
W4	670	Preston Workshops	Melbourne & Metropolitan Tramways Board	1933
W5	792	Preston Workshops	Melbourne & Metropolitan Tramways Board	1937
W5	849	Preston Workshops	Melbourne & Metropolitan Tramways Board	1940
	41	Newport Workshops	Victorian Railways	1923

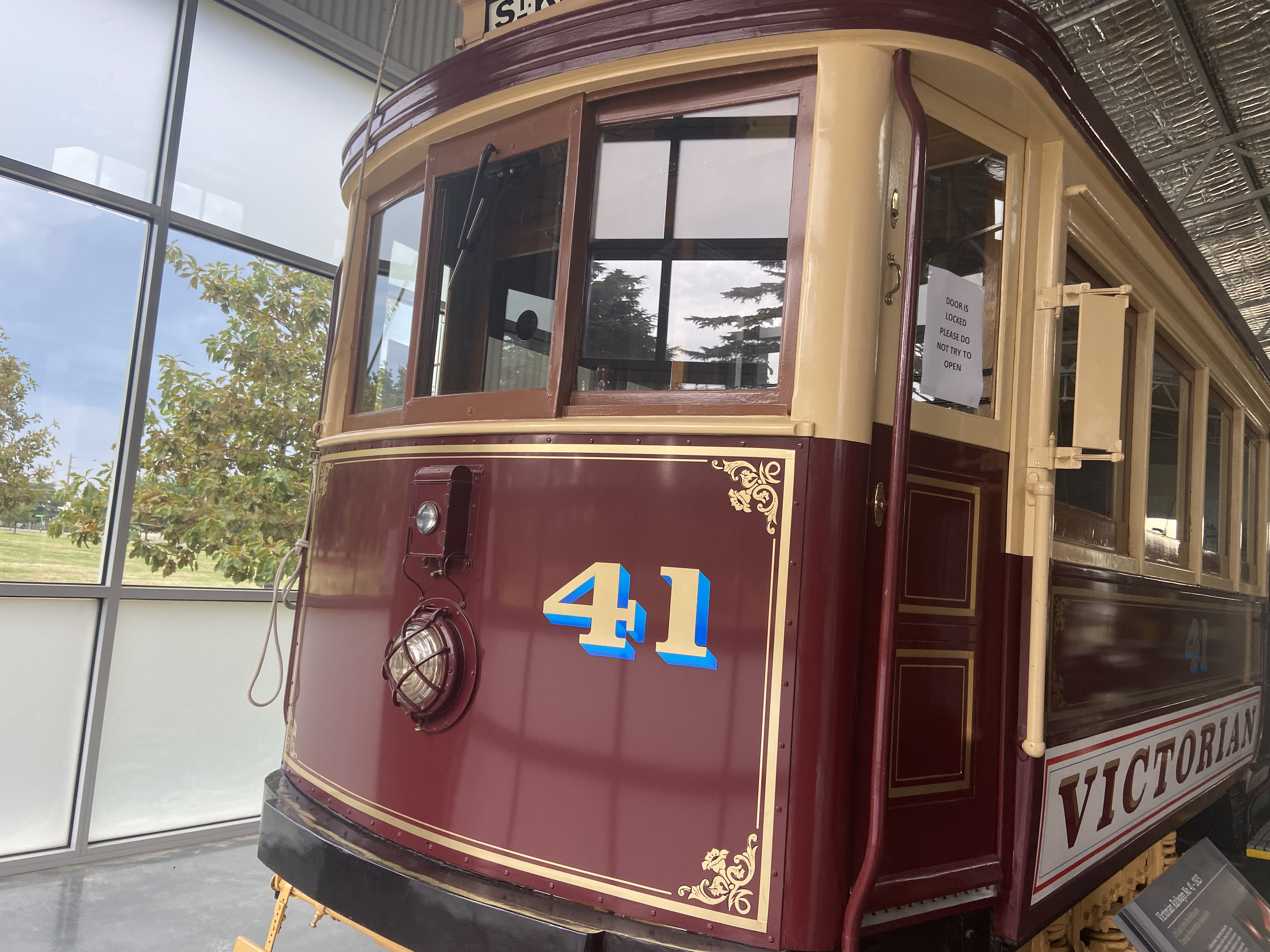
No. 41

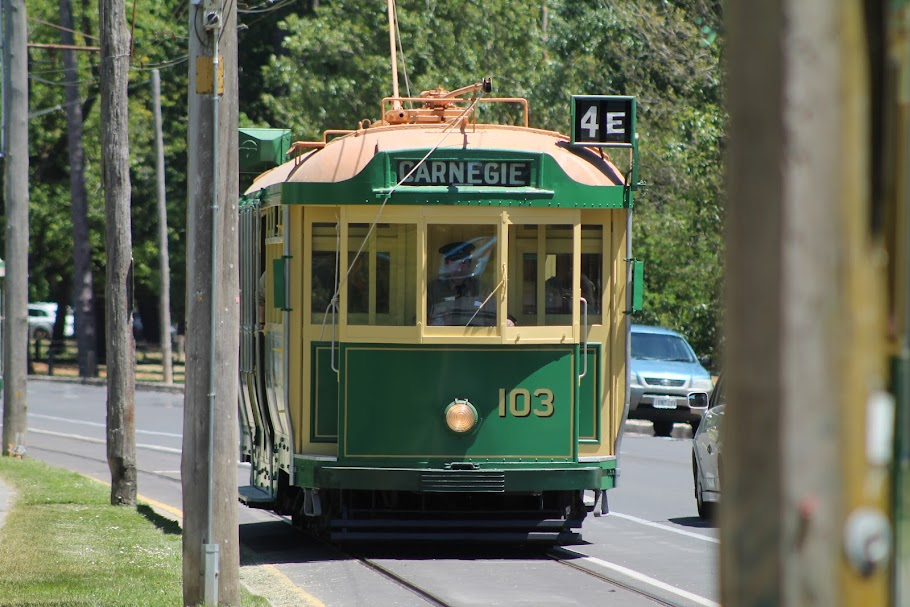
No. 103

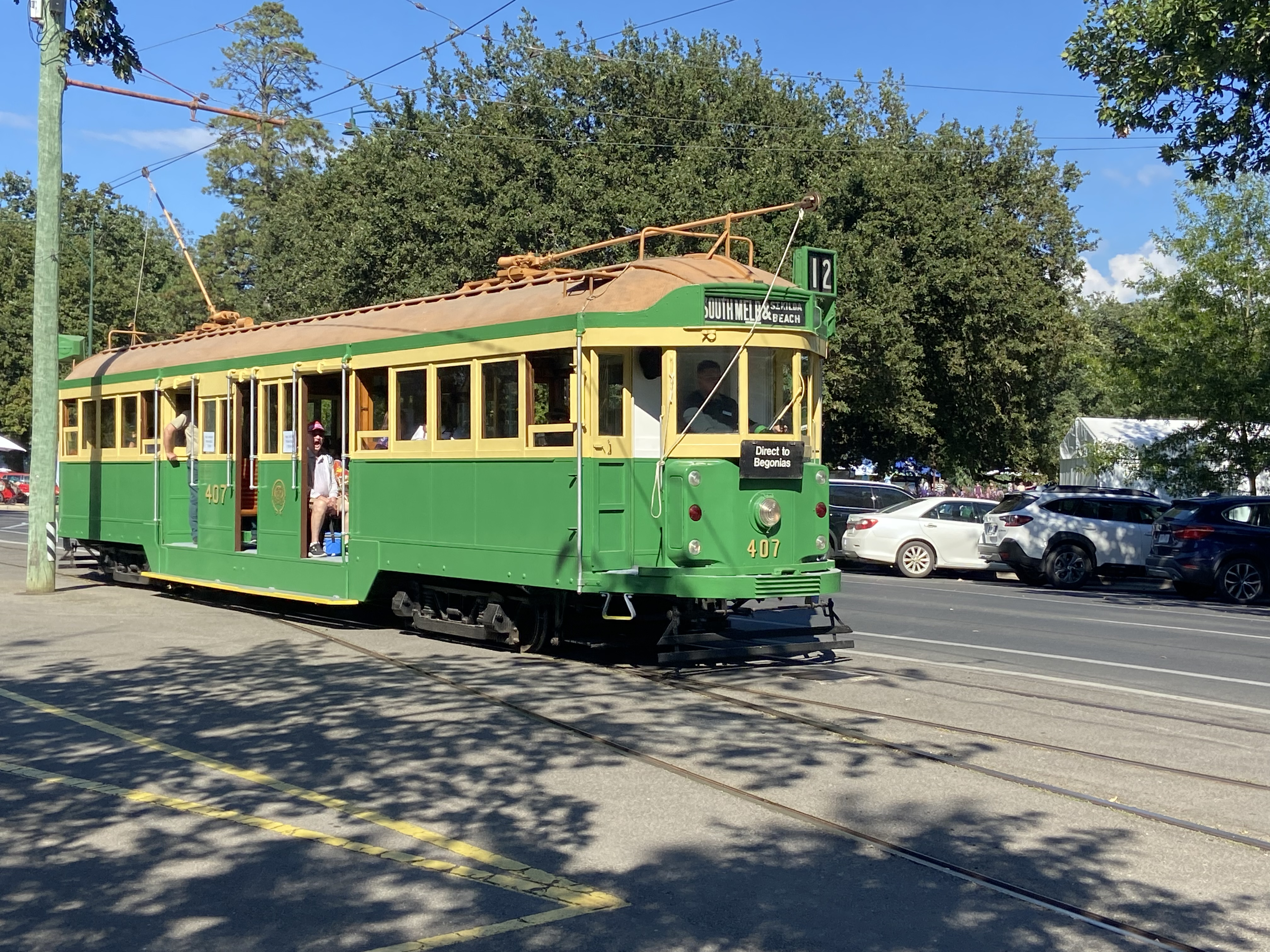
No. 407
