= Bus Preservation Society of Western Australia =

Society in Perth, Western Australia

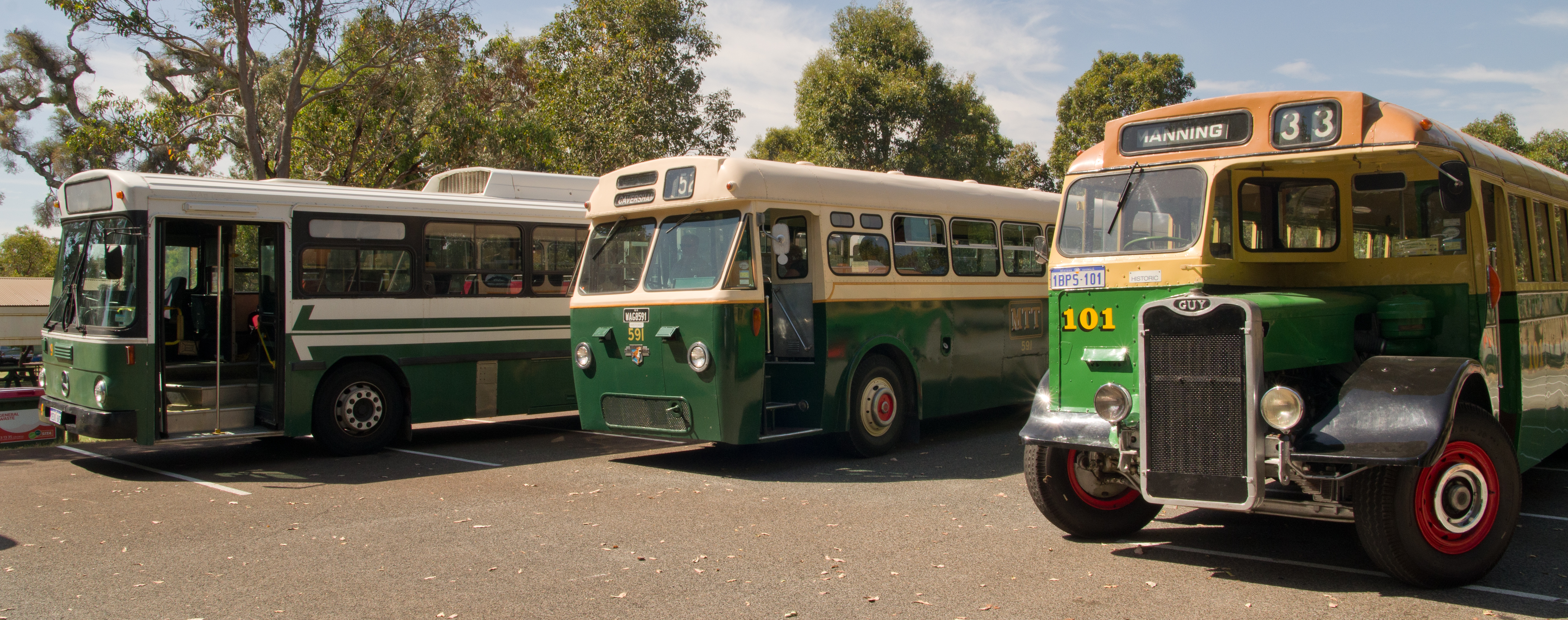
- Buses owned by the Society
- Established: 1981
- Location: Whiteman Park, Perth; Western Australia
- Collection size: 35 buses
- Website: www.bpswa.org

The Bus Preservation Society of Western Australia (BPSWA) is a bus preservation society in Perth, Western Australia. It operates a museum in Whiteman Park.

== History ==
Following the closure of the Perth trolleybus system in August 1969, the Western Australian Electric Transport Association was formed. In November 1981, the association split into two societies; the Bus Museum of Western Australia and the Perth Electric Tramway Society.

Having initially stored its collection in Bellevue, in 1990 all were relocated to Transperth's Trigg depot before a permanent move to Whiteman Park in April 1993.

In March 2000, the Bus Museum of Western Australia was renamed the Bus Preservation Society of Western Australia.

== Collection ==
The BPSWA owns a fleet of 35 buses, mainly formerly owned by Transperth and Western Australian Government Railways. Most are stabled at Whiteman Park with some having previously been stored at the Midland Railway Workshops.

== Operations ==
The BPSWA operates the Whiteman Explorer within Whiteman Park on Mondays and the Whiteman Park Shuttle Bus from Whiteman Park railway station on Saturdays and Sundays.

== Publication ==
The BPSWA publishes a quarterly periodical titled The Rattler.
