= Perth Electric Tramway Society =

Organisation in Perth, Western Australia

- Established: 1981
- Location: Whiteman Park, Perth; Western Australia
- Type: Heritage tramway
- Collection size: 29 trams; 3 trolleybusses
- Public transit access: Whiteman Park railway station
- Website: pets.org.au

The Perth Electric Tramway Society (PETS) is a tram preservation society in Perth, Western Australia. It operates a heritage tramway in Whiteman Park.

== History ==
Following the closure of the Perth trolleybus system in August 1969, the Western Australian Electric Transport Association was formed. In November 1981, the association split into two societies; the Perth Electric Tramway Society (PETS) and the Bus Preservation Society of Western Australia.

Having previously stabled its collection in Wilson at Casteldare, the Metropolitan Regional Planning Authority granted PETS permission to build a museum within Whiteman Park in 1982. It was officially opened on 21 September 1986. Initially operating a fleet of W-class Melbourne trams, the society has gradually restored Western Australian trams to service.

== Collection ==
As at August 2022, PETS owned 29 trams and three trolleybuses. Eleven trams came from Perth, eight from Melbourne, four from Fremantle, two from Adelaide, two from Kalgoorlie, one from Ballarat and one from Brisbane. The trolleybuses all came from Perth. Because the society's tramway is standard gauge, Western Australian trams have had to be regauged from their original narrow gauge when restored for operation.

== Operations ==
Perth Electric Tramway

The PETS tramway operates regular services within Whiteman Park along a 2.5-kilometre (1.6 mi) route between Village Junction and Mussell Pool. Trams connect to the Bennett Brook Railway at both ends of the line.

While trams used to also operate to the Dumpellier Drive entrance to Whiteman Park, this section of the tramway has been disused for a number of years.

== Connecting service ==
As part of the development of Whiteman Park railway station on the Ellenbrook railway line, the tramway was extended by 1.4 kilometres (0.87 mi) to the new station. The extension opened on 8 December 2024.
