= X class Melbourne tram =

Trams imported to Melbourne, Australia

X-class
- Manufacturers: JG Brill Company; St Louis Car Company
- Constructed: 1923
- Number built: 2
- Fleet numbers: 217-218
- Capacity: 33

Specifications
- Car length: 8.53 m (28 ft 0 in)
- Width: 2.55 m (8 ft 4 in)
- Height: 3.05 m (10 ft 0 in)
- Wheel diameter: 673 mm (26.5 in)
- Wheelbase: 3.05 m (10 ft 0 in)
- Weight: 8.4 t (19,000 lb)
- Current collection: Trolley pole
- Bogies: JG Brill Company 79E (217); St Louis Car Company No 7 (218)
- Track gauge: 1,435 mm (4 ft 8 1/2 in)

The X-class was a class of two Birney trams imported from United States manufacturers JG Brill Company and St Louis Car Company by the Melbourne & Metropolitan Tramways Board. In June 1924 both entered service from Hawthorn depot on the Power Street to Hawthorn Bridge service. In 1928 both were transferred to Glenhuntly depot to operate the Point Ormond route.

In 1956, 217 was transferred to the isolated Footscray network. They also operated night services taking them as far as Brighton East, Malvern East and Coburg North. With the cessation of these services in 1957, both were withdrawn.

== Preservation ==
One has been preserved:

- 217 by the Tramway Museum Society of Victoria
