= W class Melbourne tram =

Electric tram family built in Melbourne, Australia

W class
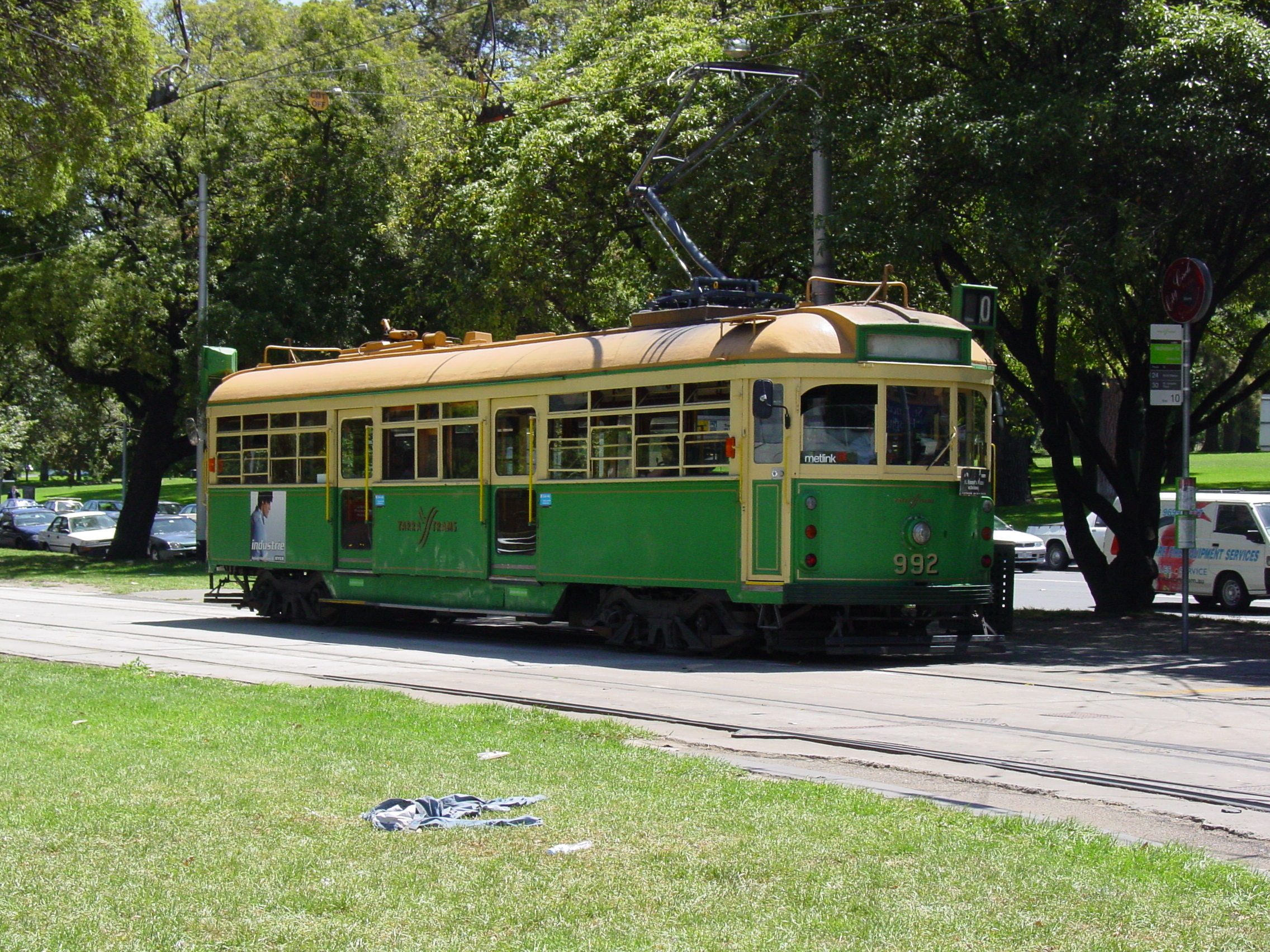
- W6.992 on Victoria Street in February 2006
- Manufacturer: Melbourne & Metropolitan Tramways Board
- Assembly: Holden Body Builders; Holden Street Workshops; James Moore & Sons; Preston Workshops
- Constructed: 1923–1956
- Number built: 752
- Number in service: 11 in Melbourne on City Circle services
- Fleet numbers: 219–1040 (not all numbers in that range are used by W classes)
- Depot: Southbank

Specifications
- Electric systems: 600 V DC (nominal) from overhead catenary
- Current collection: Trolley pole or pantograph
- UIC classification: Bo′Bo′
- AAR wheel arrangement: B-B
- Track gauge: 1,435 mm (4 ft 8 1/2 in) standard gauge

The W class trams are a family of electric trams built by the Melbourne & Metropolitan Tramways Board (MMTB) between 1923 and 1956. Over the 33 years of production, 752 vehicles spanning 12 sub-classes were constructed, the majority at the MMTB's Preston Workshops.

A small fleet continue to operate on the tramway network of Melbourne, Australia, where they are used on the City Circle tourist route. The W class tram is a cultural icon to Melbourne: those that remain in the city are classified by the National Trust of Australia.

As well as Melbourne, W class trams operate on tourist and heritage systems across the world. A number of older variants have been withdrawn from service and later sent to cities such as Copenhagen, San Francisco, Savannah and Seattle, and by private enthusiasts. In 2018, 134 W class trams were offered to the Australian public for new uses.

As of December 2021, only 11 W class trams remain in service in Melbourne, all of which are W8 trams operating on the City Circle tram route.

== History ==
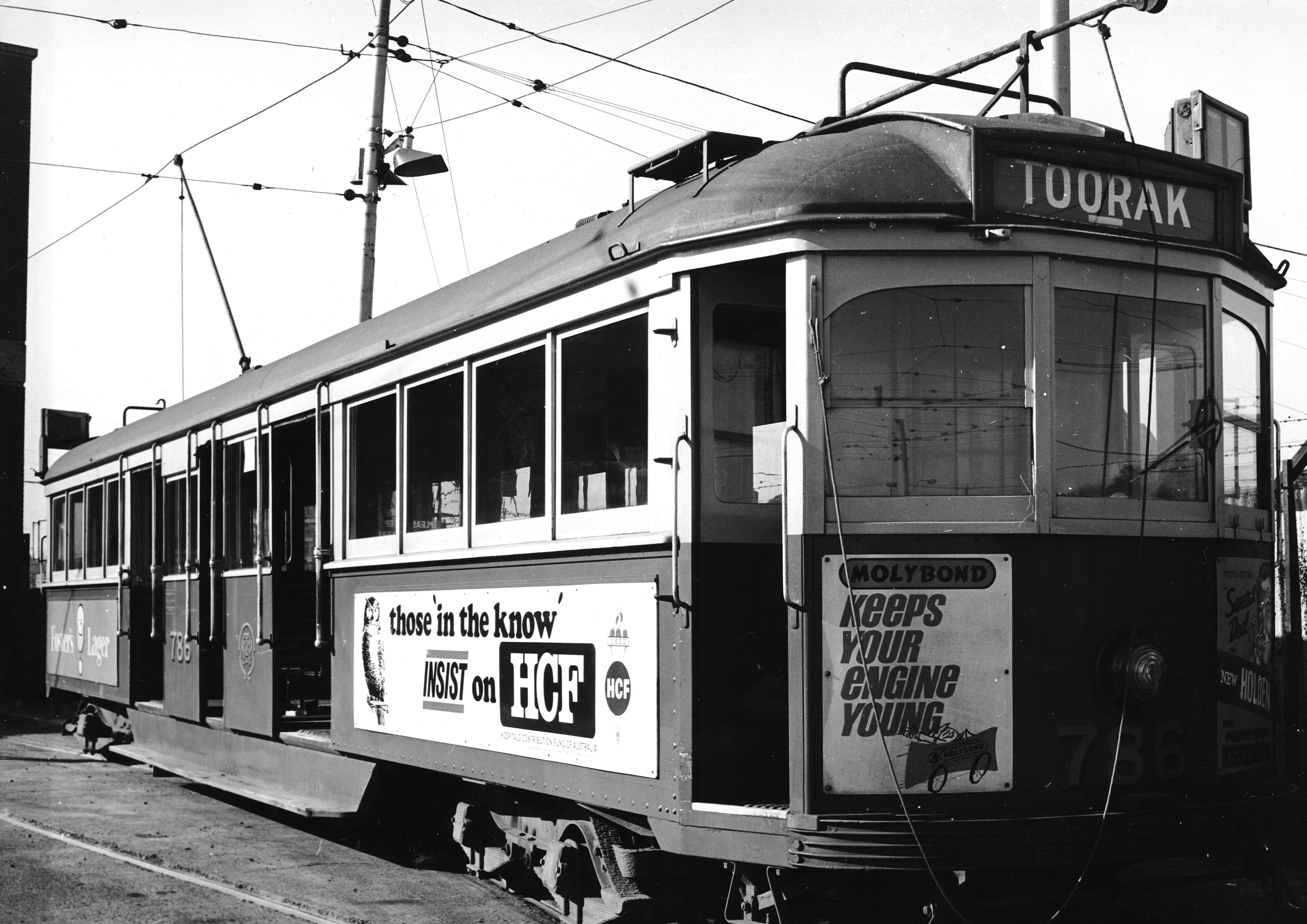
A W5 class tram, 1969

W class trams were introduced to Melbourne in 1923 as a new standard design. They had a dual bogie layout and were characterised by a substantial timber frame supplanted by a steel underframe, a simple rugged design, and fine craftsmanship (particularly the older models). The W class was the mainstay of Melbourne's tramways system for 60 years. A total of 752 trams of all variants were built.

The original variant (W) was a typical Drop-centre design tram, which was also used in Adelaide, Brisbane, Sydney, and later Bendigo, Ballarat and Geelong following movements of earlier Melbourne trams. The W1 was created with no centre doors, and changed to the W2 design, which all earlier Ws were upgraded to. A handful were upgraded to the SW2 design with sliding doors, which were followed by the unsuccessful W3 and W4 designs. All were supplemented in the late 1930s by 120 W5 (or "Clyde") class trams with wider cabins, and more powerful motors. However, they were notorious for being difficult to drive smoothly. After this came the SW5, initially only the last ten W5 trams fitted with sliding doors before entering service, but by the 1990s the majority of the W5 fleet, having been upgraded. The SW6 followed on, and became the most popular W class tram with crews and passengers alike, because they were fast, smooth and comfortable, compared with earlier W variants. After experimentation with a PCC streetcar, construction of Ws resumed in 1951, with more SW6 and later W6 and the final 40 W class trams (W7) emerging from Preston Workshops by 1956, when the need to provide something more capable of dealing with Olympic Games crowds than Bourke Street's buses prompted the last expansion of the network.

In April 1971, W7 1024 became the first tram to carry all over advertising livery when it was painted for the State Electricity Commission of Victoria, followed by Heinz (June 1971), Preston Market (August 1971), and Channel 0 (October 1971). It was fitted with 400 light bulbs on its roofline. It was joined by W6 900 in 1973. In 1977 W2 546 was fitted with an experimental Siemens pantograph.

The W7 class with its pneumatic sliding doors and softer suspension proved popular with passengers. It was not until the 1990s that the W class was finally considered surplus to rolling stock requirements. Mass withdrawal came with the introduction of the B2 class (although the previous Z and A classes had enabled withdrawal of W2s), with the remaining weather blind trams being removed by 1993, all of the 1980s SW5 conversions besides no.728 (which remained in service until 2011) by 1994, and many SW6/W6/W7 classes. In 1998, all Ws remaining in service were withdrawn due to a strike, and, although unintended, this would become the end for the Ws which were not running on routes 30, 78/79 and 35. In 2014, all non-City Circle Ws were withdrawn, in 2018, the restaurant trams, and in 2019, the remaining non-W8 class trams. This left only the upgraded sliding door W class trams, modernised from 2013 onwards, which were designated the W8 class.

=== Removal from service ===
In 1992, an official mass withdrawal of the W class was announced by transport minister Alan Brown. That was generally due to the fact that over 200 W class remained in service, while the newer Z trams were in storage in varying locations, after being displaced by the newer A and B class vehicles. Protests over the disappearing icons brought about a reconsideration of the withdrawal policy, and it was decided 53 Ws would be retained for tourist purposes. The popular zero-fare City Circle tourist route commenced in April 1994, using 12 of the 53 trams retained.

When the network was privatised in August 1999, 30 W class trams were allocated to M>Tram and 23 to Yarra Trams.

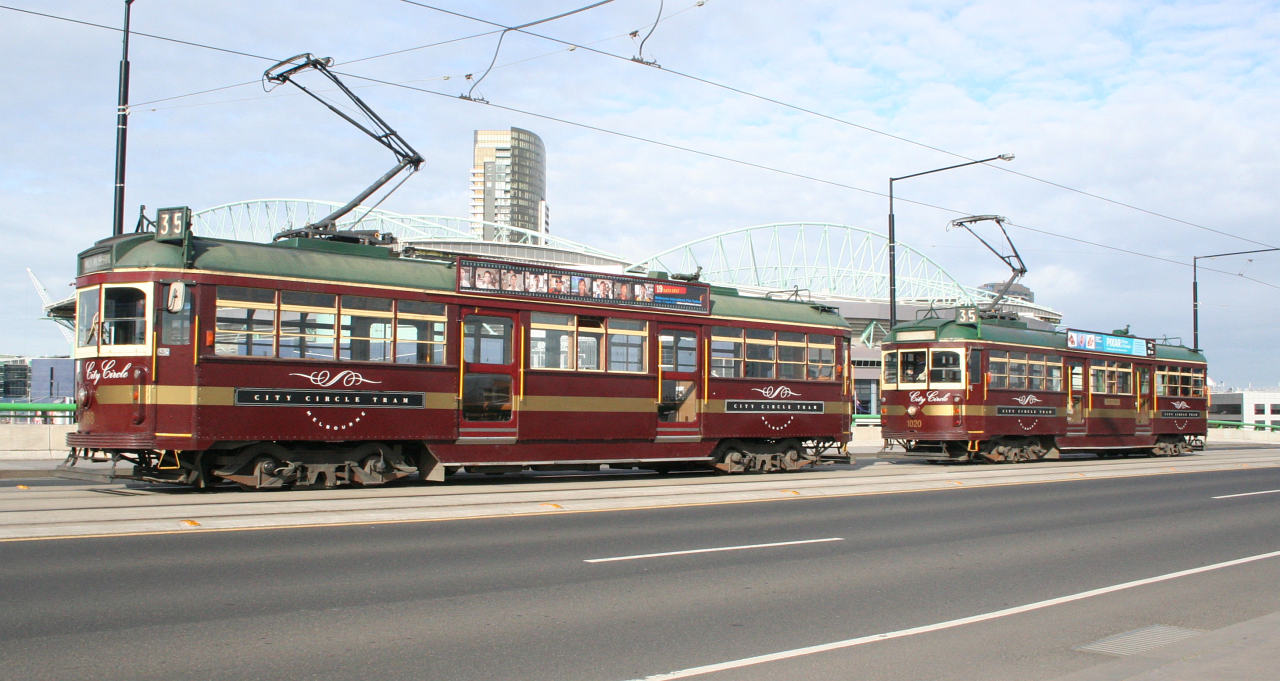
City Circle trams on La Trobe Street

In mid-2000 all operating W class trams were removed from service following a series of incidents involving brake problems. Some returned to service in May 2001 on the City Circle route, with 25 operating in September 2003. The return of another 30 W classes was announced in September 2003, but on more limited routes than before their withdrawal from service. All 53 had been returned to service by late 2003. The reintroduction followed the installation of new braking systems, speedometers, and the imposition of a 40 km/h (25 mph) speed limit. The trolley poles were subsequently replaced with pantographs.

The condition of the W class fleet was criticised by the Australian Rail Tram & Bus Industry Union in September 2008, with a demand for the State Government to repair or withdraw them. A Yarra Trams spokesman said that the fleet met maintenance standards, but required more cosmetic work than other trams due to their wooden structure and age.

In January 2010, it was announced by transport minister Martin Pakula that the 26 W class trams operating the inner city revenue services would be phased out by 2012, claiming that they were no longer suitable for revenue service and would be replaced by more modern trams. This prompted a new campaign from the National Trust of Australia to retain the W class trams in service. It was also proposed that unused W class trams could be better utilised by refurbishing and leasing them as "roving ambassadors" to other cities, with the claim that this could generate revenue for investment into the public transport system.

=== Heritage operations ===
Following a change in government, in May 2011 $8 million over four years was allocated for the restoration of eight W class trams, with options for new routes to be considered. The restoration is occurring at Preston Workshops (where many W class trams were originally built), with the resultant tram being dubbed W8s, they are receiving full rebuilds and many upgrades, including modernised braking and suspension. The first, W8 946 entered service in March 2013, while the second, W8 959 returned from 18 months of work performed at Bendigo Tramways in June 2013. These have since been joined by W8 957 and W8 1010. As at February 2017, 981 and 983 were under overhaul in Bendigo.

As at March 2017, 12 W class trams were in service on the Melbourne tram network, All run on the zero-fare City Circle tourist route at any time during operating hours. The last examples on routes 30, 78 and 79 were withdrawn in late 2013.

Three W6 class trams were converted for use on the Colonial Tramcar Restaurant service which operated three meal services daily. As of October 2018, Yarra Trams has declared the restaurant trams to be too unsafe for use on the network.

== Preservation ==
The W class tramcars are highly popular trams in preservation, both throughout Australia and around the world.

W class trams were used in the filming of the HBO mini-series The Pacific, including W3 class tram number 667.

A number of W class trams have been sent overseas, including five that were sold to Seattle between 1978 and 1993, where they operated as Seattle's own heritage streetcar line, George Benson Waterfront Streetcar Line, between 1982 and 2005. Since 1990, public outrage has forced an embargo to be placed on the sale of these trams to any overseas interest. Three of these trams have been sold to Loop Trolley for use in St. Louis.

In February 2004, after some years of negotiation, a W6 class tram, Melbourne 930, was shipped to Edmonton as an ambassador for the City of Melbourne. The tram, which is owned by the Edmonton Radial Railway Society, operates as part of the High Level Bridge Streetcar fleet, connecting Old Strathcona to Downtown on 3 kilometres (1.9 mi) of track.

The Dallas MATA and the Memphis MATA both run W class trams on their downtown streetcar services. A highly modified W class tram began running in 2009 along River Street in Savannah, Georgia, its AC motors powered by biodiesel-fueled generators. Memphis MATA Trolley has 10 W-2 and 1 W-5 cars. Dallas' system has a single operating W-2, nicknamed "Matilda", along with operating other models of streetcars and trollies.

In the 1980s, W2 520 was bought by the musician and composer Elton John in what he described as one of "my drug-induced moments". John exported the tram to England where it stands in the grounds of Woodside, his country house in Berkshire.

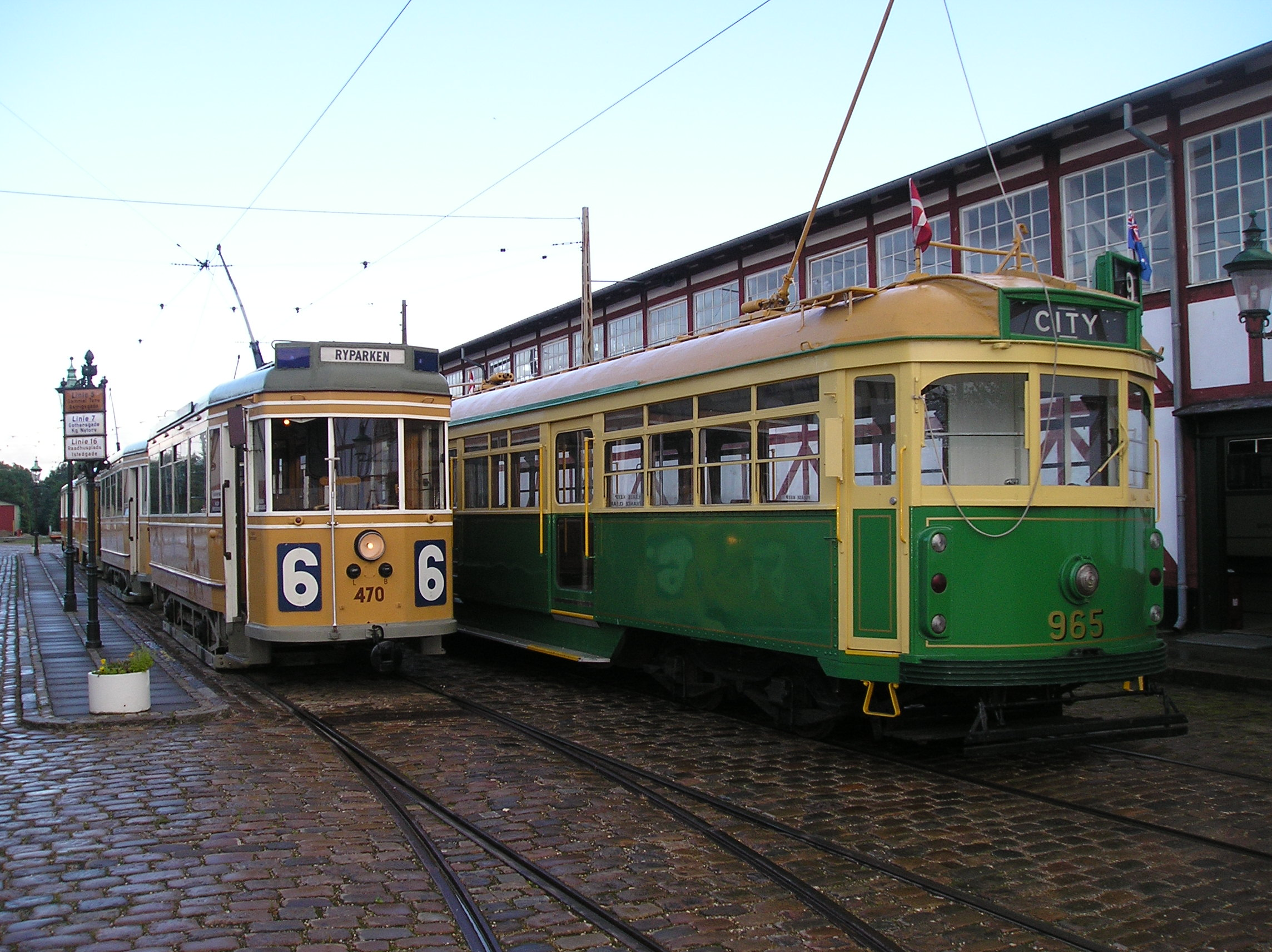
W6 965 at the Skjoldenæsholm Tram Museum

In 2005, W6 965 was restored at a cost of $25,000 and given as a wedding present from the Victorian Government to Princess Mary and Crown Prince Frederik of Denmark. Shipping line Maersk transported the tram to Denmark free of charge, waiving the estimated bill of $40,000. It was placed in the custody of the Skjoldenæsholm Tram Museum.

In October 2016, the government announced the formation of a reference group to formulate a strategy for the over 237 in store at Newport Workshops.

In 2018, the results of the condition audit were published as part of the Daniel Andrews State Government's Retired Trams Strategy. The audit found there was 237 W class trams in storage in 2018, with most not in a suitable condition for tourist operations. Of the 237, 17 were operational for use on the City Circle line or the Colonial Tramcar Restaurant, 25 were in good overall condition and suitable for W8 upgrading, six were privately owned, 11 had historical significance, 20 were former Transporting Art trams, and 24 were of poor or incomplete condition but suitable for donors and spares. Trams with historical significance were to be kept and made available to museums, augmenting the 34 W class trams already on display throughout Victoria. Five trams were kept for potential gifting and nine for other potential future uses. Former art trams were to be kept in storage for future public display.

The balance of trams, 134, had a condition or significance that did not lend itself to being preserved for operations in any way. These trams were offered to the public by the State Government under an expression of interest process, with trams offered for free to schools, community groups and non-profit organisations. Private buyers and business could purchase a tram for $1,000 plus the cost of transport, with owners having to explain how they would restore, repurpose and maintain the trams for use. A panel was established to assess applications, with priority given to maintaining public access. Trams were expected to be used for purposes like cafes or classrooms.

More than 1,500 applications were received through the process. The first two W class trams to leave Newport Workshop under the process were acquired by the City of Launceston in Tasmania in 2019 to be restored and used in a public space.

== Subclasses ==
=== W ===
There were 200 W class trams built from 1923 to 1926. They could seat 52 passengers with room for 93 people standing. They were built by the MMTB's Holden Street Workshop and Preston Workshops. Some were also built by private companies including James Moore & Sons of South Melbourne, and Holden Body Builders of Adelaide. All 200 were converted to W2s between 1928 and 1933. No. 380 was converted back to original condition in 1988 for the Heritage Fleet. No. 220 is undergoing conversion by the TMSV Bylands from W2 class back to the original W class tram.

=== W1 ===
There were 30 W1 class trams built between 1925 and 1928. They were a variation on the W class trams and used a different seating arrangement. The middle of the tram was open like the earlier cable cars and allowed passengers to get on and off the tram quickly. However, in cold and wet weather the openings were only covered by pull down blinds. Passengers were looking for more comfort and these trams were later converted to the W2 design. Four SW2s have been converted back to W1 in preservation.

=== W2/SW2 ===
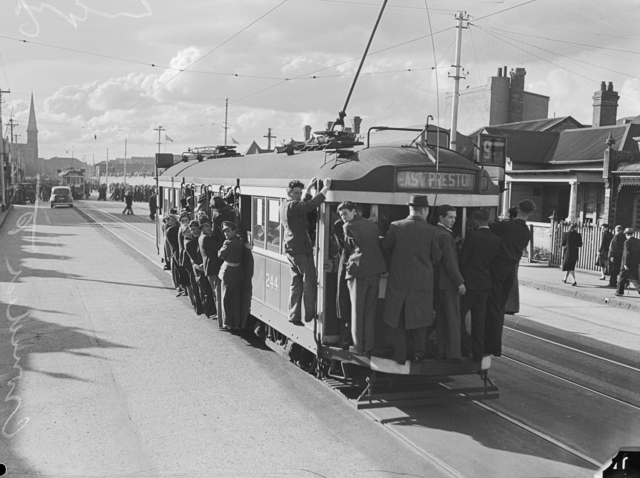
A W2 class tram overloaded with passengers on Brunswick Street, Fitzroy North in 1944

The W2 class was introduced in 1927 and remained in service until its final withdrawal in mid-1987.

The 406-strong class was the backbone of the MMTB's vast fleet during their heyday from the 1940s to 1960s. Most class members had been converted from the earlier W and W1 classes. The trams featured two enclosed saloon areas at either end of the tram and an open "drop-centre" section in the middle. A trademark feature of these vehicles until the 1970s was their uncomfortable wooden bench-style seats, a feature they shared with most other Melbourne trams of that period.

Mechanically, they had four under-floor motors powering two sets of the MMTB's "number one" bogies. The driver's controls were made by Westinghouse, Dick Kerr controllers, and Clyde Engineering controllers. The W2 class also had many variant gears within the tram bogies, the spur-geared W2 classes were notable due to their humming sound.

Two of the W2 class had their roller blind doors converted to sliding doors and were reclassed SW2. Four W1 class were converted directly to SW2 class.

Towards the end of their useful lives, many class members were converted to service (non-passenger) stock such as carborundum rail scrubbers, permanent-way vehicles, railgrinders and breakdown units. A large number of units were also sold to museums and public transport operators in Australia and around the world, with some still running today.

From 1978 until 1982 many W2s were painted by well-known Australian Artists as part of the "Transporting Art" program. In 1981 W2 442 was converted for use with the Colonial Tramcar Restaurant, entering service in November 1982. The last W2 to run in regular service in Melbourne ran in December 1987 on route 93 La Trobe Street to Bundoora, although a small number were used well into the early 1990s during extended tram shortages. No.442 was used by the Colonial Tramcar Restaurant until 2006 when it was withdrawn.

While the majority of W2 class trams were sold to private owners or overseas, 26 W2 and 5 SW2 class trams are preserved by heritage tramways in Australia and New Zealand.

=== W3 ===
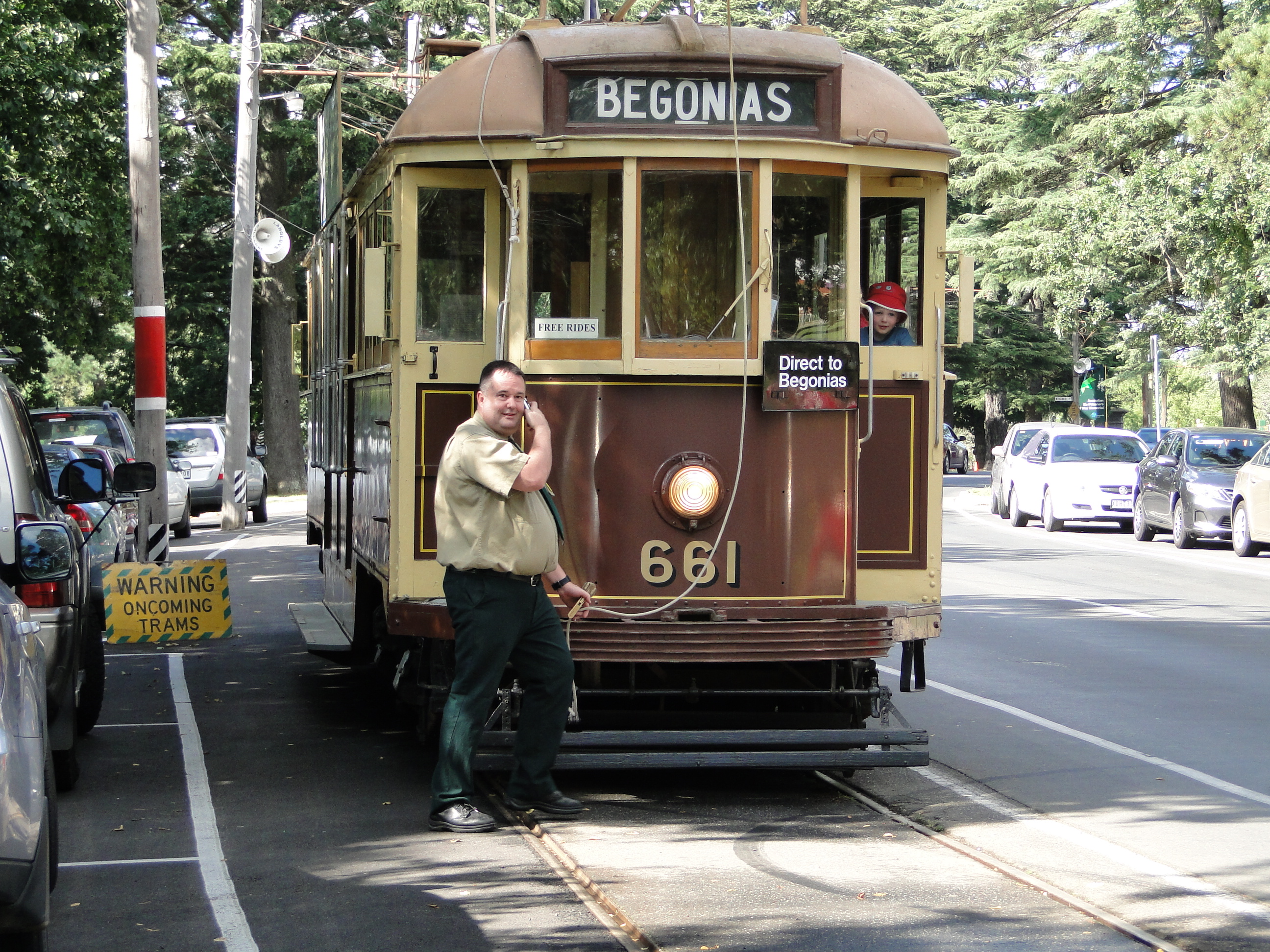
Preserved W3 661 in original livery at Lake Wendouree, Ballarat in March 2011

The W3 class trams were built between 1930 and 1934. These were the first trams to use an all steel frame. There were 16 trams built at Preston Workshops. They were built from parts and equipment which had been intended for building Y1 class trams. They had larger wheels, 33 inches (838 mm) in diameter, which were designed to provide a smoother and quieter ride. These wheels came from scrapped S and T class trams. These larger wheels made the tram body sit higher, and the floors in the drop centre were ramped to reduce the step into the saloon.

During the 1960s the trams developed cracks in the frame which held the motors and all were withdrawn from service by 1969.

Four W3 trams (661, 663, 667, 668) are preserved by heritage organisations. Preserved car W3 661 was damaged in an accident involving a motor vehicle on 10 March 2019 in Ballarat. The damage from the accident means that the tram requires extensive repairs to the frame and body.

=== W4 ===
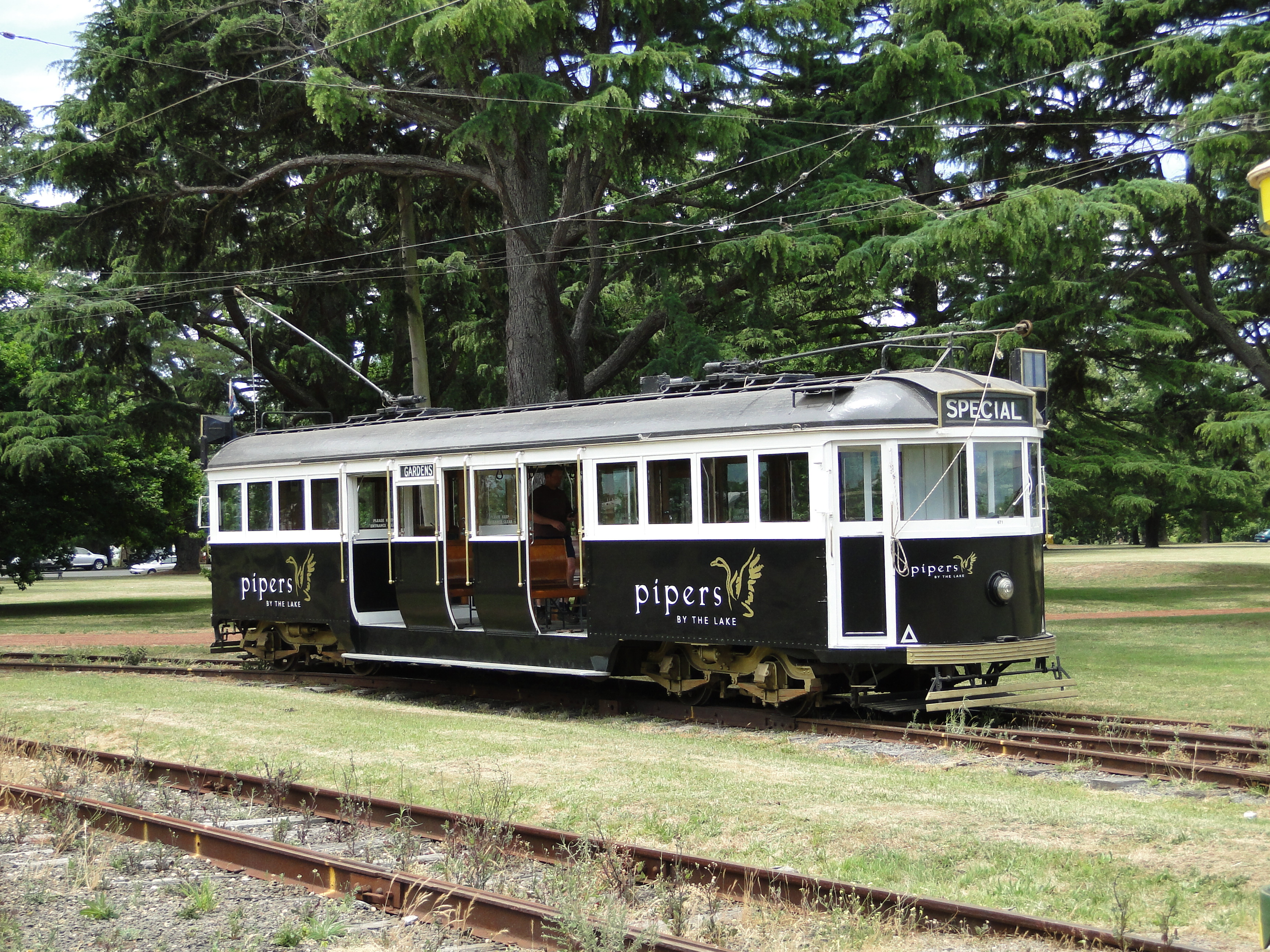
Preserved W4 671 in advertising livery in Ballarat in December 2012

There were five W4 class trams built between 1933 and 1935. They had a wider body and lower floor than the W3, and had transverse seating in the saloon. They were all withdrawn by 1968. The wider body of the tram meant the drivers found it difficult to see the steps.

Four W4 trams (670, 671, 673 and 674) are preserved by heritage tramways in Australia.

=== CW5/W5/SW5 ===
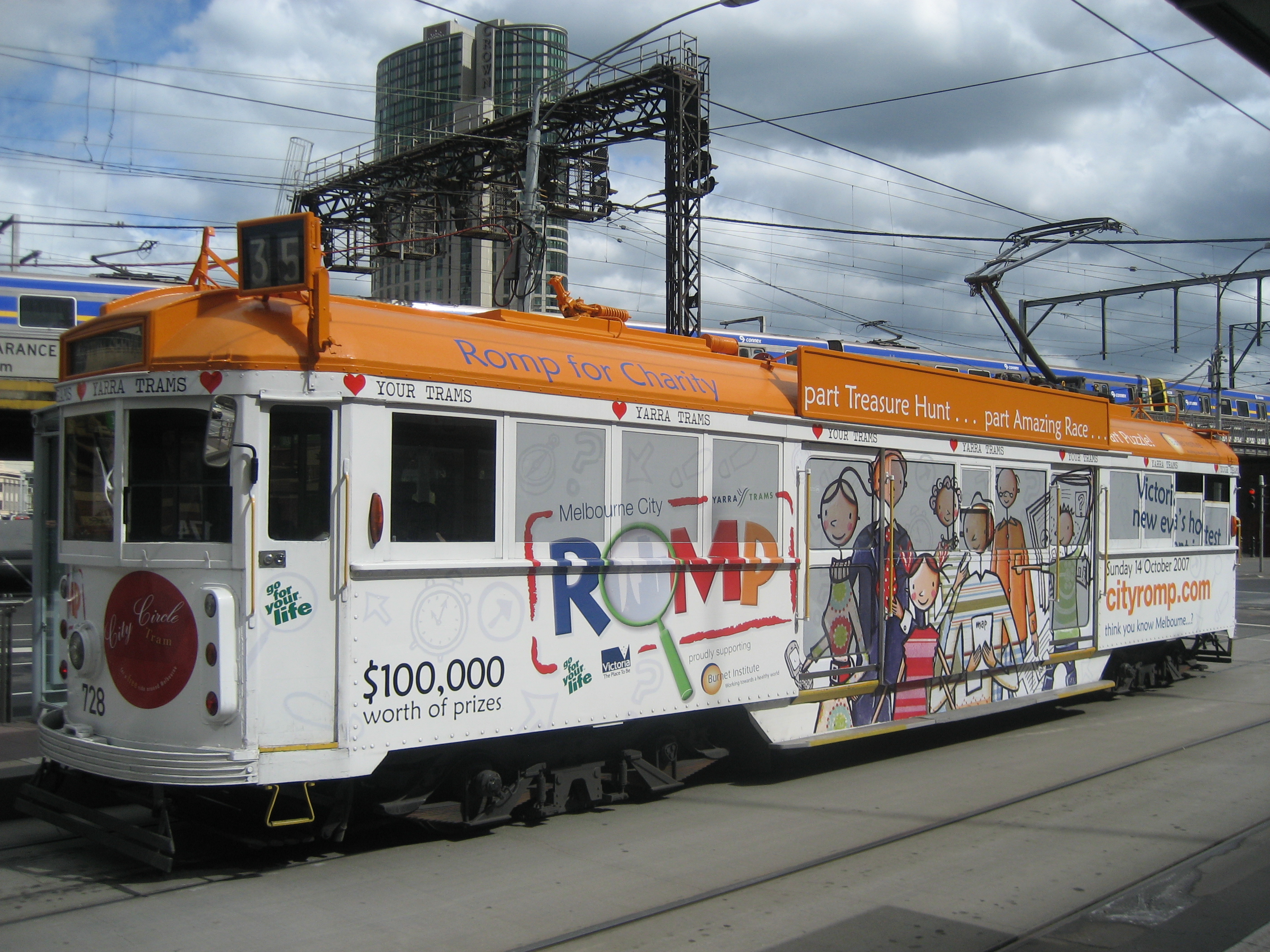
SW5 728 in advertising livery on the corner of Flinders & Market Streets in 2007

Five CW5 class trams, numbered 681 to 685, were built at the Preston Workshops in 1934/35. They had wider bodies, based on the previous W4 class, but utilised electrical equipment recovered from scrapped Maximum Traction C class trams (hence the "C" prefix). They were the only W class trams with only 2 motors (instead of 4), and were not considered successful. Fleet numbers 686 to 719 were reserved for 34 more of the type using equipment from the remaining C class trams, but no more were constructed, and all CW5s were converted to standard W5 class trams in 1956.

In 1935, the first of 120 W5 class trams entered service, with the same body as a CW5 class tram, but were equipped with equal-wheel, 4-motor bogies based on those used on the W3- and W4 class trams. Production continued until 1939 and included five CW5 class trams under construction being converted before release to traffic. Many of these W5 class trams were allocated to Essendon and (the new) Brunswick depots as a result of the mid-1930s conversion of the Elizabeth Street cable trams to electric traction. Most cars numbered above 800 had "swept corner" windscreens. From the early 1970s, many cars had their little-used, narrow centre doorways panelled-over, and most had their original windshields replaced with SW6 class types, which had "swept corners" with half-drop side windows, but not all of them received the deeper fascia.

During construction in 1939, the last ten W5 class trams were modified with sliding doors, like as the first of the SW6 class trams which was being built at the same time. They also had metal-framed, full-drop saloon windows with quarter lights. In 1956, W5 class trams 785 and 787 were converted to SW5 class (type 2), following accident damage. Parts from the cancelled order for more W7 class trams were used in the repairs, and the two cars featured half-drop saloon windows, with quarter lights.

An additional 83 W5 class trams were converted to SW5 class (type 3) trams between 1983 and 1986. They were fitted with aluminium sliding doors, but retained their original wooden-framed, full-drop windows.

Apart from those severely damaged in accidents, the first W5 was withdrawn in 1987, and the last in 1994. During the mass withdrawal of W class trams in 1994–96, the majority of SW5 class trams were retired in preference to the higher numbered trams, ostensibly due to the discovery of asbestos in the controllers.

As of January 2020, there were no SW5 or W5 trams remaining in service, with the majority stored. However, nine W5 and three SW5 trams are preserved with heritage tramways in Australia and New Zealand, including a fully restored W5, number 774, on display at Hawthorn Depot.

==== Fleet numbers ====
- CW5 converted to W5: 681 – 685
- Built as W5: 720 – 839
- Built as SW5: 840 – 849
- W5 converted to SW5: 681 – 682, 721 – 734, 736 – 750, 752 – 755, 757 – 760, 764 – 765, 767 – 770, 773, 775 – 777, 780 – 781, 784 – 791, 793, 796 – 797, 800, 802, 805 – 812, 814 – 816, 818 – 819, 824, 828 – 830, 834, 836 – 838

=== W6/SW6 ===
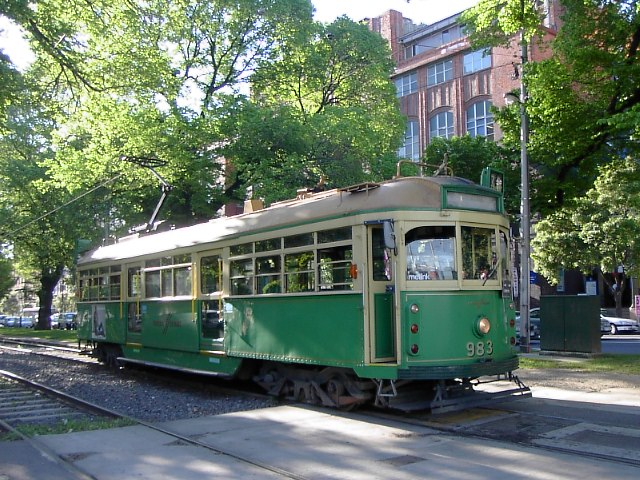
W6 983 on route 30 on Victoria Parade in October 2004

The SW6 class were introduced in 1939 and were followed by the W6 class which were produced between 1951 and 1955, 150 were built in total. At their introduction, W6 class trams were popular with passengers and crew alike for being fast, smooth and comfortable. The cab controls are the same as of other W class trams. The first 40 had flip-over wooden seats in the end saloons, the remainder having upholstered bus seats. All had wooden seats in the centre saloon until the 1970s when the entire class was refurbished with upholstered seats throughout.

W6 class trams initially begun as a sub group of the SW6 class trams, but later became their own class. The W6 differed from the SW6 in having quieter wheels and gears plus additional soundproofing.

As of June 2020, no trams are operational in original condition with Yarra Trams, with all of them being converted into W8 trams or stored. Two W6 and twelve SW6 trams are in the hands of preservation groups, one of which is used as a café tram in Bendigo. Two SW6 trams had been converted and installed at shelters in Wattle Park in eastern Melbourne, but had both been replaced by other W trams by October 2025. Three SW6 class trams also operated on the Colonial Tramcar Restaurant service.

=== W7 ===
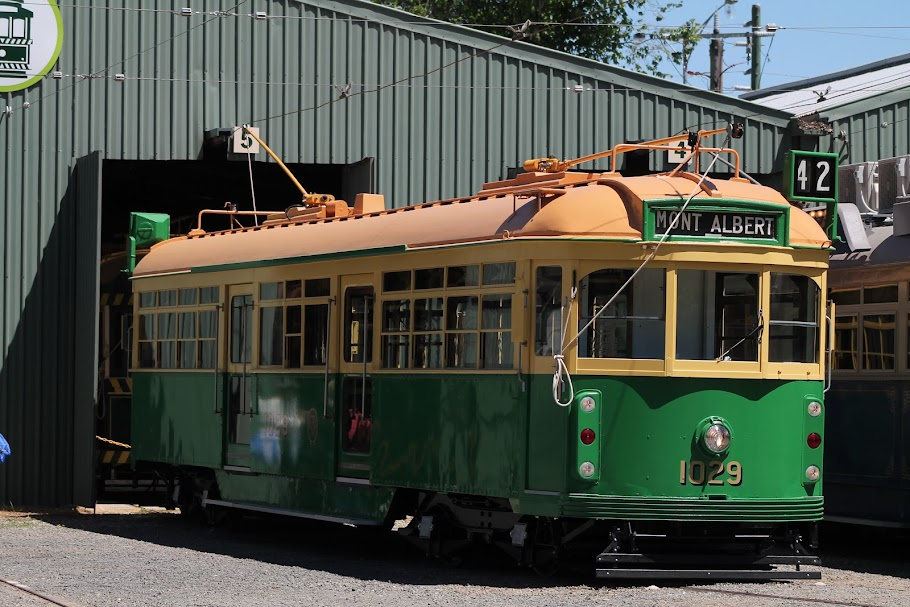
W7. 1029 at the Ballarat Tramway Museum

Forty W7 class trams were built in 1955/56 for operation on new Bourke Street routes (routes 86 and 96). Originally 70 were ordered but the number was cut to 40 following a change of government at the 1955 state election. They were very similar to the preceding W6 class, but with upholstered seats throughout. Thirteen had their frames built by Ansair. As of January 2020, none remained in service with Yarra Trams. Six W7 class trams are preserved by heritage groups in Australia and New Zealand.

=== W8 ===
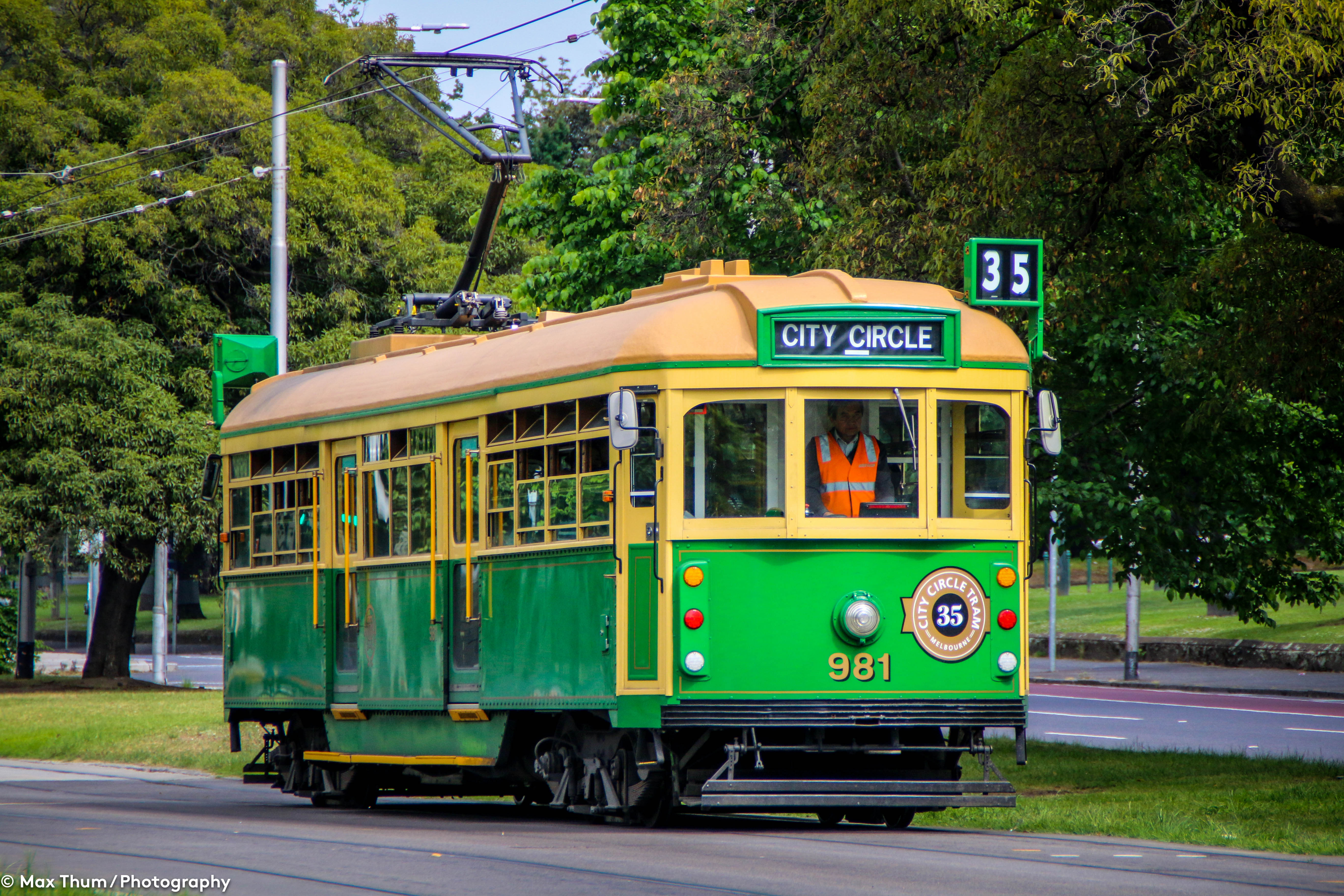
W8.983 along Victoria Parade

SW6 922 was partly modernised at Preston Workshops in 1993. It was to be a prototype for rebuilding the remaining SW6 fleet with air conditioning, roller bearings, modern head and tail lights, fluorescent interior lighting, dot-matrix display and pantograph using many of the same components as used in the A2 and B2 class trams. It was designated the W8 class and renumbered 1101. The rebuild radically altered the appearance of the tram and the National Trust ordered the conversion be suspended before completion.

Four (946, 957, 959 and 1010) were subsequently modernised from 2012 and designated the W8 class. The upgrades include improved traction motors, suspension and braking, improved crashworthiness and LED lighting, while retaining the general appearance of the original SW6 and W7s.

Since 2018, W8 trams are the only W classes to have current safety accreditation to run on the Yarra Trams network.

Currently, there are 13 W8 trams in service, along with one stored after several days of operation, and several currently under conversion. About 25 older W class trams are stored by Yarra Trams, awaiting future W8 conversion.

=== Subclass summary ===
W Type	Total built	Known scrapped	Stored in depots	Converted to other class	Preserved	With Yarra Trams	Other interstate	Overseas	Given to local community	Notes
W	200	0	0	200	2	0	0	0	0	2 Converted back from W2 class
W1	30	0	0	30	2	0	0	0	0	2 Converted back from W2 class
W2	406	71	0	7	22	0	28	36	236	2 converted back to W class, 2 to W1 class, 1 to works tram. 6 unaccounted for
W3	16	4	0	0	4	0	0	0	8	
W4	5	1	0	0	4	0	0	0	0	
CW5	5	0	0	5	0	0	0	0	0	
W5	125	2	3	85	5	0	2	6	16	6 unaccounted for
SW2	6	1	0	0	2	0	0	2	0	1 unaccounted for
SW5	95	4	49	0	6	0	4	0	27	5 unaccounted for
SW6	120	10	39	8	11	0	5	5	33	9 unaccounted for
W6	30	0	14	3	3	0	2	0	7	1 unaccounted for
W7	40	2	14	1	10	0	1	0	12	
W8	12	0	0	0	0	12	0	0	0	
Total	756	95	119	339	71	12	42	49	339	1 converted to works tram. 28 unaccounted for

== List of preserved W class trams ==
=== Preservation groups ===
W type	Ballarat	Bendigo	Bylands	Haddon	Hawthorn	South Australia	Sydney	Perth	MOTAT, NZ	Notes
W	–	–	1	–	1	–	–	–	–	
W1	–	–	1	–	1	–	–	–	–	
W2	1	2	5	2	2	2	3	4	1	
W3	1	–	1	2	–	–	–	–	–	
W4	1	–	1	1	–	–	–	1	–	
CW5	–	–	–	–	–	–	–	–	–	All were converted to W5 class
W5	–	–	2	1	1	–	–	1	–	
SW2	–	–	1	–	–	–	–	1	–	
SW5	3	2	2	1	3	–	1	2	–	
SW6	3	2	2	–	2	–	–	1	4	
W6	–	–	1	–	–	–	–	1	–	
W7	2	–	1	–	1	1	1	2	1	
W8	–	–	–	–	–	–	–	–	–	All still in service with Yarra Trams
Total	11	6	18	7	11	3	5	11	6	

W class trams preserved with Australian and New Zealand Heritage Groups
Class	Number	Location	Comments
W	220	Tramway Museum Society of Victoria	Under restoration to original condition
W2	245	Sydney Tramway Museum	Stored
W2	249	Sydney Tramway Museum	Was in a livery for a proposed Canberra system
W2	294	Tramway Museum, St Kilda, Adelaide	In operational condition
W2	321	Museum of Transport & Technology, Auckland, New Zealand	
W2	325	Hawthorn depot	Has been converted to a driver training tram, thus is permanently immobile and housed at Hawthorn tram depot
W2	329	Perth Electric Tramway Society	In operational condition
W2	354	Tramway Museum, St Kilda, Adelaide	Used as a works tram
W2	357	Melbourne Tramcar Preservation Association	
W2	368	Perth Electric Tramway Society	In need of restoration
W	380	Hawthorn depot	Part of the Melbourne historic tram fleet, was reconverted from a W2-series tram in 1988 at Preston Workshops.
W2	393	Perth Electric Tramway Society	In operational condition
W2	407	Melbourne Tramcar Preservation Association	
W2	421	Bendigo Tramway	Rebuilt back from W2, renumbered Bendigo 31
SW2	426	Perth Electric Tramway Society	In operational condition
W1	427	Tramway Museum Society of Victoria	Reconverted from a W2-series tram in 1988 at Preston Workshops courtesy of a Victorian Government grant to celebrate 100 years of trams in Melbourne
W1	431	Hawthorn depot	Part of the Melbourne historic tram fleet, was reconverted from a W2-series tram in 1988 at Preston Workshops
W2	441	Perth Electric Tramway Society	On loan from Bendigo Tramway and in operational condition
W2	456	Bendigo Tramway	In storage
W2	504	Ballarat Tramway Museum	Stored at Offsite Storage.
W2	509	Tramway Museum Society of Victoria	
W2	510	Hawthorn depot	Part of the Melbourne historic tram fleet
W2	568	Tramway Museum Society of Victoria	
W2	600	Sydney Tramway Museum	
W2	643	Tramway Museum Society of Victoria	
SW2	644	Tramway Museum Society of Victoria	
W2	646	Tramway Museum Society of Victoria	
W2	650	Tramway Museum Society of Victoria	
W3	656	Melbourne Tramcar Preservation Association	
W3	661	Ballarat Tramway Museum	Stored awaiting repairs to frame and bodywork after car struck the side of the tram.
W3	663	Melbourne Tramcar Preservation Association	
W3	667	Tramway Museum Society of Victoria	
W4	670	Melbourne Tramcar Preservation Association	
W4	671	Ballarat Tramway Museum	In operational condition
W4	673	Tramway Museum Society of Victoria	
W4	674	Perth Electric Tramway Society	In operational condition
SW5	681	Ballarat Tramway Museum	Stored at Offsite Storage.
SW5	727	Ballarat Tramway Museum	Stored at Offsite Storage.
SW5	729	Perth Electric Tramway Society	To be returned to service.
SW5	739	Tramway Museum Society of Victoria	
SW5	749	Perth Electric Tramway Society	To be returned to service.
SW5	753	Ballarat Tramway Museum	Stored at Offsite Storage.
W5	766	Perth Electric Tramway Society	In need of restoration
SW5	769	Ballarat Tramway Museum	Stored at Offsite Storage.
SW5	773	Bendigo Tramway	Used as accompanying tram for the Bendigo Tram Cafe with Bendigo No. 3.
W5	774	Hawthorn depot	
W5	782	Tramway Museum Society of Victoria	
W5	792	Melbourne Tramcar Preservation Association	
W5	795	Tramway Museum Society of Victoria	
SW5	797	Ballarat Tramway Museum	Stored Bungaree
SW5	808	Bendigo Tramway	
SW5	810	Sydney Tramway Museum	Stored
SW5	821	Ballarat Tramway Museum	Stored at Offsite Storage.
SW5	829	Ballarat Tramway Museum	Lin Onus (Yorta Yorta) Art Tram, Stored.
SW5	836	Ballarat Tramway Museum	Stored at Offsite Storage.
SW5	840	Tramway Museum Society of Victoria	
SW5	849	Melbourne Tramcar Preservation Association	
SW6	850	Ballarat Tramway Museum	Stored at Offsite Storage.
SW6	851	Ballarat Tramway Museum	Stored at Offsite Storage.
SW6	855	Ballarat Tramway Museum	Stored at Offsite Storage.
SW6	857	Ballarat Tramway Museum	Stored at Offsite Storage.
SW6	866	Ballarat Tramway Museum	Stored at Offsite Storage.
SW6	880	Bendigo Tramway	
SW6	883	Ballarat Tramway Museum	Was formerly at Mount Clear Primary School but has moved to Bungaree.
SW6	887	Tramway Museum Society of Victoria	
SW6	891	Perth Electric Tramway Society, Western Australia	
SW6	893	Museum of Transport & Technology, Auckland, New Zealand	
SW6	902	Tramway Museum Society of Victoria	
SW6	906	Museum of Transport & Technology, Auckland, New Zealand	
SW6	908	Ballarat Tramway Museum	Stored at Offsite Storage.
SW6	918	Bendigo Tramway	Renumbered Bendigo 34
SW6	922	Tramway Museum Society of Victoria	Static without Bogies. Is to become the museums picnic tram.
SW6	924	Ballarat Tramway Museum	Stored at Offsite Storage.
SW6	939	Ballarat Tramway Museum	Used as a cafe/special function vehicle, named as "Cuthberts 939"
W6	972	Ballarat Tramway Museum	Stored at Offsite Storage.
W6	996	Tramway Museum Society of Victoria	
W6	998	Perth Electric Tramway Society, Western Australia	
W7	1001	Tramway Museum Society of Victoria	
W7	1012	Ballarat Tramway Museum	Stored at Offsite Storage.
W7	1013	Tramway Museum, St Kilda, Adelaide	In operational condition
W7	1017	Perth Electric Tramway Society	In operational condition
W7	1023	Perth Electric Tramway Society, Western Australia	
W7	1029	Ballarat Tramway Museum	After a long restoration to become a multipurpose tram which includes disabled access, it officially entered service in November 2023.
W7	1031	Ballarat Tramway Museum	Stored at Offsite Storage.
W7	1032	Museum of Transport & Technology, Auckland, New Zealand	
W7	1036	Sydney Tramway Museum	Stored
W7	1037	Ballarat Tramway Museum	Stored at Offsite Storage.
W7	1039	Ballarat Tramway Museum	Stored at Offsite Storage.
W7	1040	Hawthorn depot	Last W class built

=== Other preserved ===
W class trams preserved in Australia and New Zealand
Class	Number	Location	Comments
W1	432	–	Sydney Tramway Museum. Destroyed in fire 23 October 2015
W2	221	Irishtown	Body located at private property along with W2 433 & W2 565. All three in poor condition.
W2	283	Blackburn	Body privately owned in Blackburn.
W2	293	Bruthen	Privately owned in Tooradin.
W2	315	Magic Mountain Merimbula	Used as a Kiosk at Magic Mountain Merimbula, NSW.
W2	323	Trafalgar Holden Museum	Located Trafalgar Holden Museum Victoria
W2	370	–	Sydney Tramway Museum. To Glenreagh Mountain Railway. Scrapped
W2	379	Methodist Ladies' College, Kew	Painted in a colourful artwork.
W2	385	Tooradin	Privately owned in Tooradin.
W2	388	Windsor Hotel Perth	Front half of tram is located outside the building. The opposite side of road is located WA B Class No 15.
W2	410	Lauriston, Victoria	Converted into a Bed & Breakfast. Partly destroyed by a tree after a storm in 2021.
W2	429	Gosnells, Western Australia	A part of the Gosnells Hotel.
W2	433	Irishtown	Body located at private property along with W2 565 & W2 221. All three in poor condition.
W2	438	Yuroke	
W2	444	Albion Hotel in Cottesloe	Located inside of the Albion Hotel at Cottesloe.
W2	447	Korong Vale	Formerly owned by Sydney Tramway Museum. Sold 15 November 2015.
W2	470	Bendigo?	Formerly owned by Bendigo Tramways, now privately owned.
W2	472	Dixons Creek	Located at Fergusson Winery & Restaurant as private accommodation.
W2	475	Cremorne Street, Cremorne, VIC 3121	Was located at a farm along Research-Warrandyte Road, Victoria. Moved to Cremorne Street sometime prior to August 2020.
W2	477	Sunraysia	Being converted to BnB.
W2	487	Tarnagulla	
W2	522	Tramway Museum Society of Victoria?	
W2	529	Drysdale, Victoria	Plinthed just outside of Drysdale, it is visible from the road.
W2	556	The Crooked Carrot Café near Perth, Western Australia	Only half of the tram exists, plinthed with SW6 942.
W2	563	Corop	Moved from Newbridge to Corop Sculpture Park in June 2024.
W2	565	Irishtown	Body located at private property along with W2 433 & W2 221. All three in poor condition.
W2	584	Broadford	Body located at a property in Broadford.
W2	590	Wallaroo	Used as accommodation at Last Stop Ambledown Brook Near Wallaroo.
W2	604	Private	Body located at a property in Benella.
W2	608	Private	Used as accommodation in Krowera, Victoria.
W2	609	Chewton	
W2	638	Private	Body privately owned in Daylesford.
W2	649	Mount Isa	Located inside the Mount Isa Irish Club in Mount Isa, Queensland. Painted in a colourful red livery.
W2	653	Private	Plinthed at property on Bellarine Peninsula with another classmate.
SW2	275	Clyde Grammar, Clyde	Renumbered Bendigo 33. Sold to Clyde Grammar and plinthed near school entrance.
SW2	432	–	Sydney Tramway Museum. Destroyed in an arson attack in October 2015
SW2	436	North of Auckland, New Zealand	Privately owned, was converted from a W1 class tram to SW2 class in 1938. Previously Masterton, New Zealand. Restored in M&MTB green and cream as private accommodation.
W3	655	Gruyere, Victoria	
W3	657	Campbellfield, Victoria	
W3	659	Lake Eildon, Victoria	
W3	660	Berwick, Victoria	
W3	664	Boolarra, Victoria	
W3	665	Wallan, Victoria	
W3	666	Woolert, Victoria	
W3	669	Mangrove Mountain, NSW	
W5	684	Victorian Railway Workshops Art and Antiques, Seymour, Victoria	
W5	685	Liston Transport Heritage Park, NSW.	Noted as being located Eveleigh, NSW
SW5	725	Coburg Primary School, Coburg, Victoria	
SW5	728	Queen Victoria Market, Melbourne, Victoria	
SW5	730	Tara B&B, Guildford, Victoria	
SW5	732	Mansfield Zoo, Mansfield, Victoria	Converted to a Cafe for visitors to purchase food and drinks from.
SW5	733	Our Friends Farm, Tallarook, Victoria	Repurposed as Accommodation, Giftshop, and bar along with SW6 920 & 955.
SW5	734	Casey Grammar School, Cranbourne, Victoria	
SW5	736	??	Tram spotted along Yale Drive, Epping on the 19/11/24. Went to Brisbane to be used as a wedding venue.
SW5	737	Shepparton, Victoria	
SW5	742	Riverbend Park, Launceston, Tasmania	Tram was to be delivered to the park but was apparently cancelled due to asbestos concerns.
SW5	745	The Oaks Lilydale, Lilydale, Victoria	Launched as a BnB after an 18-month transformation. Original seating retained as a lounge area.
SW	746	Wattle Park, Burwood, Victoria	Given to Parks Victoria from Newport by VicTrack, refurbished at Bendigo for use as an outdoor picnic shelter, and installed at Wattle Park in 2025.
SW5	747	Woolgoolga	Located in a lot on Bosworth Road in Woolgoolga, north of Coffs Harbour.
SW5	750	Victorian Railway Workshops Art and Antiques, Seymour, Victoria	
SW5	755	Chatham Primary School, Chatham, Victoria	Tram is listed on Victrack Website, though does not appear to be on school site.
SW5	757	Balcombe Grammar School, Mount Martha, Victoria	
W5	761	Don Watson Transport, Bacchus Marsh, Victoria	Plinthed near Don Watson Transport just outside of Bacchus Marsh.
W5	762	Sydney Tramway Museum?	
SW5	764	William Angliss Institute, Melbourne, Vic	Transported to William Angliss Institute in November 2022.
SW5	767	Spit Shack, Canberra, ACT	Used for dining purposes.
SW5	768	Deer Park North Primary School, Deer Park North, Victoria	Tram was located at Bendigo before being delivered to the school site on 19 December 2024.
SW5	770	Riverbend Park, Launceston, Tasmania	Tram was to be delivered to the park but was apparently canceled due to asbestos concerns.
SW5	772	Guys Hill, Victoria.	Being converted in to an art gallery.
SW5	775	Jennings Street School, Laverton, Victoria	Tram is listed on Victrack Website, though does not appear to be on school site.
SW5	777	Wattle Park, Burwood, Victoria	Given to Parks Victoria from Newport by VicTrack, refurbished at Bendigo for use as an outdoor picnic shelter, and installed at Wattle Park in 2025.
W5	778	Newton, Victoria	
W5	779	Poowong, Victoria	
SW5	787	Campbellfield	Located at Eye Kandy Productions in Campbellfield.
SW5	788	Bendigo Tramway	Currently stored in the Bendigo extension.
SW5	789	Red Rock Regional Theatre and Gallery, Cororooke, Victoria.	
SW5	790	Edgars Mission, Lancefield, Victoria	
SW5	791	Red Hill, Victoria.	
SW5	793	Edgars Mission, Lancefield, Victoria	
W5	794	Withers Holiday Village, Lakes Entrance, Victoria	
W5	801	Koondrook, Victoria	
W5	804	Fawkner, Victoria	
SW5	805	Bendigo Artists, Bendigo, Victoria	
SW5	807	Mt Perry Men's Shed Association, Mount Perry, Queensland	
SW5	812	Diamond Creek Rotary, Diamond Creek, Victoria	Fully restored. A Tram Cafe opened in October 2020. Acquired from the Victorian State Government after a successful application by the Rotary Club of Diamond Creek, Diamond Creek CFA, Diamond Creek Men's Shed and Nillumbik Shire Council. The cafe also features a large deck and pergola and state of the art playground. Araluen, a disability support service in Diamond Creek run the cafe three days a week.
SW5	815	Grange Junction Café, Glen Huntly, Victoria	
W5	817	Templestowe, Victoria	
SW5	818	Corryong Historic Machinery Society, Corryong, Victoria	
SW5	819	Michael Unwin Wines Windermere, Victoria	Being worked on to become a prominent feature of the winery, to become a function space. It is missing its bogies.
W5	822	Lancefield, Victoria	
W5	825	Queanbeyan, NSW	
W5	827	Reservoir, Victoria	
SW5	830	Benetook Farm, Mildura, Victoria	
W5	833	Big 4 Yarra Valley Park Lane Holiday Park, Healesville, Victoria	
SW5	834	Bairnsdale Workers' Accommodation in Lucknow	
SW5	837	Deakin University, Burwood, Victoria	
SW5	838	Parsons Gully Heathcote Winery, Heathcote, Victoria	
SW5	841	Bendigo Tramway	Currently stored in the Bendigo extension.
SW5	845	Bendigo Tramway	Currently stored in the Bendigo extension.
SW5	847	Taradale Primary School, Taradale, Victoria	
SW6	854	Bendigo Tramway	Currently stored in the Bendigo extension.
SW6	858	Woolgoolga	Located in a lot on Bosworth Road in Woolgoolga, north of Coffs Harbour.
SW6	861	Wattle Park, Burwood, Victoria	Replacement for number 885 since 2013 after the latter was burnt down in December 2011. Removed by 2025 following vandalism & damage.
SW6	865	Clunes Community Gardens, Clunes, Victoria	
SW6	867	Bendigo Tramway	Currently stored in the Bendigo extension.
SW6	868	Alice Miller School, Macedon, Victoria	Converted into a recording studio and internet radio station for students.
SW6	871	Terang RSL, Terang, Victoria	Cosmetically Restored as a World War 2 tribute for veterans.
SW6	874	Wallace Hotel, Wallace, Victoria	
SW6	877	Bighouse Arts, Coburg North, Victoria	
SW6	878	St Mary's Catholic Primary School, Altona, Victoria	Delivered to the school in July 2023.
SW6	879	Dilato Investments, Melbourne, Victoria	Was at Clunes Bottle Museum
SW6	882	Sarah Thomas BnB, Penola, South Australia	
SW6	884	Bendigo Tramway	Currently stored in the Bendigo extension.
SW6	885	Wattle Park, Burwood, Victoria	Destroyed in a fire in December 2011
SW6	889	Main Ridge Alpacas, Red Hill, Victoria	
SW6	894	Tell Tales Bed & Breakfast, Creswick, Victoria	Formerly at the Acorn Bar and Restaurant. Listed for sale on Facebook in June 2023 and moved on 21 September 2023.
SW6	896	Corop	Delivered to Corop Sculpture Park on 26 September 2024.
SW6	897	Tamana Farm B&B	Formerly at Gisborne Vintage Machinery Society.
SW6	903	Highfields Pioneer Village Highfields, Queensland	
SW6	904	Bendigo Tramway	Currently stored in the Bendigo extension.
SW6	905	Bendigo Tramway	Currently stored in the Bendigo extension.
SW6	907	Channel 10, Forest Hill, Victoria	A static set for the soap opera Neighbours.
SW6	908	Bungaree, Victoria	
SW6	910	Axedale, Victoria	
SW6	911	Terindah Estate, Bellarine, Victoria	Converted to a function area giving guests a unique dining experience.
SW6	912	Big 4 Yarra Valley Park Lane Holiday Park, Healesville, Victoria	
SW6	913	Mark McWhinney NSW Tram Museum??, in Sydney	Noted as being located Bexley, NSW
SW6	914	1/2 Arce Coffee Lounge and Nursery Howlong, NSW	
SW6	915	Taxibox Group Braeside, VIC	
SW6	917	Torquay Brewery, Torquay, Victoria	
SW6	920	Our Friends Farm, Tallarook, Victoria	Repurposed as Accommodation, Giftshop, and bar along with SW5 733 & SW6 955.
SW6	921	Kangaroo Ground, Victoria	Formerly at Newstead.
SW6	927	Mount Evelyn Garden Centre, Mount Evelyn, Victoria	
SW6	933	Newstead, Victoria	
SW6	935	Bendigo Tramway	Currently stored in the Bendigo extension.
SW6	936	Wattle Park, Burwood, Victoria	Removed by 2025 following vandalism & damage.
SW6	937	Pepper Green Farm, Bendigo, Victoria	Located in an open green area.
SW6	938	Bendigo Tramway	Currently stored in the Bendigo extension.
SW6	941	Near Ballarat, Victoria	Privately owned
SW6	942	The Crooked Carrot Cafe, Myalup, Western Australia	Plinthed with half of W2 556.
SW6	945	Stradbroke	Privately owned.
SW6	951	Ballarat, Victoria	Privately owned at a property outside of Ballarat.
SW6	953	Kinglake, Victoria	Formerly at Yarram Club Hotel. Will apparently going to a BnB in Kinglake?
SW6	955	Our Friends Farm, Tallarook, Victoria	Repurposed as Accommodation, Giftshop, and bar along with SW5 733 & SW6 920.
SW6	956	Fitzroy High School, Fitzroy, Victoria	Painted in an aboriginal livery. Tram is used as a re-engagement program for students.
SW6	958	Corop	SW6.958 delivered to Corop Sculpture Park on 25 September 2024.
SW6	962	Nambour, Queensland	
SW6	963	Near Bendigo, Victoria	Privately owned
SW6	964	Bendigo Tramway	Currently stored in the Bendigo extension.
SW	966	Healesville	Located in field with two other trams which are 988 & 945?
SW6	967	Bendigo Tramway	Currently stored in the Bendigo extension.
SW6	968	Essendon Traffic School, Essendon, Victoria	
SW6	969	Vintage Garage, Preston, Victoria	Formerly used at the Arts Centre, now located near Newman Reserve and the Preston Depot.
W6	970	Corop	W6.970 delivered to Corop Sculpture Park on 25 September 2024.
W6	973	Riverview Farm, Tatong, Victoria	
W6	974	Quealy Winemakers, Balnarring, Victoria	
W6	975	?, Tasmania	Located somewhere in Tasmania
W6	976	Montrose	Located at Mr Hummer Limos Montrose. Currently under tarps awaiting use as a restaurant.
W6	978	Impiana Estate, Skenes Creek, Victoria	
W6	985	Taxibox Group Reservoir, VIC	
W6	986	The Wattle Point Farm, Wattle Point, Victoria	
W6	987	Yass Railway Museum	Delivered to the Yass Railway Museum on 4/12/24.
W6	988	Healesville	Located in field which are 966?
W6	989	Boisdale	
W6	992	St Louis de Montfort's School, Aspendale, Victoria	
W6	993	Bendigo Tramway	Currently stored in the Bendigo extension.
W6	995	Huon Valley Independent School Association – Peregrine School, Nicholls Rivulet, Tasmania	Used for school catering & functions.
W6	999	Sunbury United Sporting Club, Sunbury, Victoria	
W7	1002	Links Community Garden, Lalor, Victoria	Used to welcome visitors and showcase Victoria's history.
W7	1004	Rosecliffe Boutique Farm Cottages, Cooran, Queensland	
W7	1005	Benton Rise Farm, Tuerong, Victoria	Plinthed alongside Tait (train) Motor Car 256M.
W7	1006	Altona Miniature Railway, Altona, Victoria	Has traction motors but is missing trolley polls and control stands. Roof was installed over the tram in June 2024.
W7	1007	Koko Black?	W7.1007 loaded on a semi-trailer on 25 July 2024 to unknown location.
W7	1009	Bega Cheese Factory, Port Melbourne, Victoria	
W7	1011	Luna Park, Melbourne, St Kilda, Victoria	Was donated to Luna Park for use as a party tram.
W7	1014	Gisborne Vintage Machinery Society, Gisborne, Victoria	Still fitted with AGC Finance advertising and has an operational bell, painted in blue colour.
W7	1020	Bendigo Tramway	Currently stored in the Bendigo extension.
W7	1024	Donald	Went to Donald, Victoria. Located near railway station.
W7	1026	Mansfield, Victoria	To be restored for Mount Buller Alpine Resort Chalet
W7	1033	Hounds Run Vineyard, Great Western, Victoria	
W7	1035	Lot 19 Gallery Arts Collective, Castlemaine, Victoria	
W7	1038	Grill'd, ?	Grill'd location not listed

=== Overseas ===
W class trams exported overseas
Class	Number	Location	Comments
W2	234	Memphis, Tennessee, USA	Used in regular service on MATA Trolley
W2	244	Ferrymead Heritage Park, Christchurch, New Zealand	Owned by the Heritage Tramway Trust, the commercial arm of the Tramway Historical Society Operating on the Christchurch City Tramway.
W2	272	Arlington, Washington, USA	Formerly used in Seattle (Waterfront Streetcar line), 1990–2005; now in storage in Arlington, Washington awaiting possible developments for return to service.
W2	321	MOTAT	Located MOTAT Auckland, New Zealand. Restored to mid 1970s configuration.
W2	331	Memphis, Tennessee, USA	Used in regular service on MATA Trolley, renumbered 455, ex-New Orleans (Riverfront Streetcar Line)
W2	336	Iowa, USA	
W2	353	Memphis, Tennessee, USA	Used in regular service on MATA Trolley, renumbered 1978
W2	369	Dallas, Texas, USA	Operates along McKinney Avenue M-Line, nicknamed Matilda
W2	392	Thailand	To Thailand Jun 2018
W2	403	San Jose, California, USA	Santa Clara Valley Transportation Authority
W2	411	Christchurch, New Zealand	Restored as a restaurant tram for use on the Christchurch Tramway but was stored in the city tram barn after 22 February 2011 earthquake. Returned to service in late 2013.
W2	417	Memphis, Tennessee, USA	Used in regular service on MATA Trolley
SW2	478	Memphis, Tennessee, USA	Used in regular service on MATA Trolley, renumbered 454, ex-New Orleans (Riverfront Streetcar Line)
W2	482	St Louis, Missouri, USA	Formerly used in Seattle (Waterfront Streetcar line), 1982–2005; later taken to St. Louis and put in indefinite storage for potential future restoration and use.
W2	496	San Francisco, California, USA	Used in regular service on F Market & Wharves line
W2	497	Iowa, USA	
W2	503	Memphis, Tennessee, USA	
W2	512	St Louis, Missouri, USA	Planned to be used in service as Loop Trolley No. 003, St. Louis, Missouri; previously used in Seattle (Waterfront Streetcar line), 1982–2005
W2	518	St Louis, Missouri, USA	Formerly in use in Seattle (Waterfront Streetcar line), 1982–2005; later taken to St. Louis and put in indefinite storage for potential future restoration and use.
W2	520	Woodside, Old Windsor, Berkshire, UK	Purchased by Elton John in the 1980s
W2	525	Arlington, Washington, USA	Formerly used as spares in Seattle, now in storage in Arlington, Washington awaiting possible developments for return to service.
W2	531	San Jose, California, USA	Operates on the Santa Clara Valley Transportation Authority historic trolley line
W2	533	Iowa, USA	
W2	539	Memphis, Tennessee, USA	Used in regular service on MATA Trolley
W2	540	Memphis, Tennessee, USA	Used in regular service on MATA Trolley
W2	545	Memphis, Tennessee, USA	Used in regular service on MATA Trolley
W2	551	Iowa, USA	
W2	553	Memphis, Tennessee, USA	Destroyed by fire on 7 April 2014
W2	567	Iowa, USA	
W2	586	San Francisco, California, USA	
W2	601	Chisholm, Minnesota, USA	Used at the Minnesota Discovery Center
W2	605	Arlington, Washington, USA	Formerly used in Seattle (Waterfront Streetcar line); 1993–2005; now in storage in Arlington, Washington awaiting possible developments for return to service.
W2	606	Chisholm, Minnesota, USA	Used at the Minnesota Discovery Center
W2	626	Memphis, Tennessee, USA	Used in regular service on MATA Trolley, renumbered 452, ex-New Orleans (Riverfront Streetcar Line)
W2	630	Iowa, USA	
W2	648	Rio Vista, California, USA	Preserved in operational condition at Western Railway Museum; operated in San Francisco during the Historic Trolley Festivals of the 1980s
W5	735	?, USA	
W5	751	Iowa, USA	
W5	756	Savannah, Georgia, USA	Was used on the River Street Streetcar, now located at the Georgia State Railroad Museum. Electric motors are powered by a generator and battery hybrid drive
W5	771	?, USA	
W5	799	Memphis, Tennessee	Used in regular service on MATA Trolley
W5	839	Iowa, USA	
SW6	852	Auckland Dockline Tramway, Auckland, New Zealand	Owned by MOTAT. Under overhaul.
SW6	881	Auckland Dockline Tramway, Auckland, New Zealand	Owned by MOTAT Unique colour scheme. Operational.
SW6	893	MOTAT	Located MOTAT Auckland, New Zealand. PTC configuration. Operational.
SW6	906	MOTAT	Located MOTAT Auckland, New Zealand. Unique colour scheme. Operational.
SW6	916	San Francisco, California, USA	Used in regular service on F Market & Wharves line
SW6	930	Edmonton Radial Railway Society, Edmonton, Canada	Used on High Level Bridge Streetcar line during the summer
SW6	965	Skjoldenæsholm Tram Museum, Denmark	Owned by HM King Frederik X and HM Queen Mary
W7	1032	MOTAT	Located MOTAT Auckland, New Zealand. PTC configuration. Stored pending overhaul.
