= York (disambiguation) =

York is a city in North Yorkshire, England; and the historical capital of Yorkshire.

York or Yorke may also refer to:

== Places ==
- City of York (disambiguation)
- Little York (disambiguation)
- New York (disambiguation)
- North York (disambiguation)
- West York (disambiguation)
- York Airport (disambiguation)
- York County (disambiguation)
- Yorktown (disambiguation)
- York Township (disambiguation)

=== Australia ===
- Cape York Peninsula, Queensland, previously York Cape
- York, Western Australia
- Shire of York, Western Australia
- Yorke Peninsula (disambiguation), articles concerning Yorke Peninsula in South Australia
- York Plains, Tasmania
- Electoral district of York, a former electorate of the Western Australian Legislative Assembly
- Electoral district of York (Legislative Council), a former electorate in Western Australia

=== Canada ===
- York, Edmonton, Alberta
- York Factory, Manitoba, a former Hudson's Bay Company (HBC) factory (trading post).
- Ontario:
  - Regional Municipality of York, also known as York Region
  - York, Ontario, a district of Toronto and former municipality
  - York County, Ontario, a former county in Ontario
  - York, Upper Canada, former name of Toronto before 1834
  - York, Haldimand County, Ontario
  - York River (Ontario)
- York, Prince Edward Island
- York River, a river in Gaspé, Quebec

=== England ===
- City of York, a local government district of North Yorkshire
- County of York, alternative name for Yorkshire
- York (European Parliament constituency)
- York (UK Parliament constituency)
- York, Lancashire, a hamlet

=== Greenland ===
- Cape York, Greenland

=== Sierra Leone ===
- York, Sierra Leone

=== United States ===
- York, Alabama
- York, Alaska
- York Mountain AVA, California wine region
- York, Georgia
- York, Illinois
- York, Indiana
- Maine:
  - York, Maine
  - York Beach, Maine
  - York Harbor, Maine
  - York River (Maine)
- York Charter Township, Michigan
- York, Missouri
- York, Montana
- York, Nebraska
- New York:
  - New York (state)
  - New York City
  - York, New York
- York, North Dakota
- York, Jefferson County, Ohio
- York, Sandusky County, Ohio
- Pennsylvania:
  - York, Pennsylvania
  - York Springs, Pennsylvania
  - York Haven, Pennsylvania
- York, South Carolina
- York River (Virginia)
- Wisconsin:
  - York, Clark County, Wisconsin
  - York, Dane County, Wisconsin
  - York, Green County, Wisconsin
  - York, Jackson County, Wisconsin

== Educational institutions ==
- York College (disambiguation)
- York High School (disambiguation)

=== Canada ===
- York University, Toronto
- York Region District School Board
- York Catholic District School Board

=== England ===
- University of York
- York College (York)
- York St John University

=== United States ===
- York School (California), Monterey, California
- York Technical College, Rock Hill, South Carolina
- York Community High School, Elmhurst, Illinois
- York County Community College, Wells, Maine
- York College of Pennsylvania, York, Pennsylvania

== Music ==
- York (group), a German dance music project
- York (album), by American rapper Blu
- York (First Exit to Brooklyn), an album by The Foetus Symphony Orchestra

== People ==
- York (explorer), an enslaved African-American member of the Lewis and Clark Expedition Corps of Discovery
- Yorke (musician), Australian musician, singer and songwriter
- Archbishop of York, the junior of the two archbishops of the Church of England
- Duke of York, a title held by various members of the British Royal Family through English history
- House of York, a dynasty of English kings in the 15th century
- York (surname), a surname (including a list of people with the name)
- Yorke (surname), a surname (including a list of people with the name)

== Sports ==
- York City F.C., an association football club
- York Knights (2003–present), a rugby league football club
- York Valkyrie, a women's rugby league football club
- York Wasps (1868–2002), a defunct rugby league football club
- York United FC, an association football club

== Other uses ==
- York (East Indiaman), East India Company ships
- York (ship)
- Avro York, a British transport plane of the 1940s
- HMS York, several warships of the British Royal Navy
- HP Yorke, a microprocessor
- York Civil, an Australian engineering and construction company founded in 1990
- York ham, a characteristic ham originating in Yorkshire
- York Imperial, an apple cultivar
- York International, a manufacturer HVAC equipment
- York Fitness, a manufacturer of fitness products
- York Peppermint Pattie, a US candy
- York Rite, a branch of freemasonry
- York Radio, a defunct consumer electronics company

== See also ==
- Battle of York (disambiguation)
- Jork, town near Hamburg, Germany
- Jórvík, the Viking Kingdom of York
- Eboracum, Britannia Inferior; the Roman York
- Yorker
