= City of York (disambiguation) =

The City of York is a local government district in North Yorkshire, England.

City of York may also refer to:

- York, the principal settlement in the City of York in North Yorkshire, England
- City of York (UK Parliament constituency), a former constituency represented in the British House of Commons
- York, Toronto, a former city within the current city of Toronto, Ontario, Canada; currently a district of Toronto
- List of ships named City of York
- The city of York, Pennsylvania

== See also ==
- York (disambiguation)
