= York School =

York School may refer to one of the following:

- York School (California), a private Episcopalian school, grades 8–12, on the outskirts of Monterey, California, United States
- York School (Toronto), a private non-denominational JK to grade 12 school in Toronto, Ontario, Canada

== See also ==
- York College (disambiguation)
- York University (disambiguation)
