= Adelaide tram =

Adelaide tram may refer to:

- Glenelg tram line
- Trams in Adelaide
