= Battle of York Factory (disambiguation) =

Battle of York Factory may refer to:

- Encounter at York Factory (1690), a naval encounter by a force under Pierre Le Moyne d'Iberville and the English in Hudson's Bay near York Factory during King William's War
- Capture of York Factory (1694), Rupert's Land (now in Manitoba, Canada); in a Hudson Bay expedition during King William's War, part of the Nine Year's War
- Battle of York Factory (1697), a naval battle during King William's War in Hudson's Bay near York Factory, Rupert's Land (now in Manitoba, Canada), part of the War of the Grand Alliance
- Raid on York Factory (1782), a raid on York Factory, Rupert's Land (now in Manitoba, Canada), during the Hudson Bay expedition; part of the American War of Independence

== See also ==
- Battle of New York (disambiguation)
- Battle of York (disambiguation)
- York Factory
