= Tram revival in Adelaide =

Modernisation of Adelaide's trams

Tramways revival in Adelaide since 2005

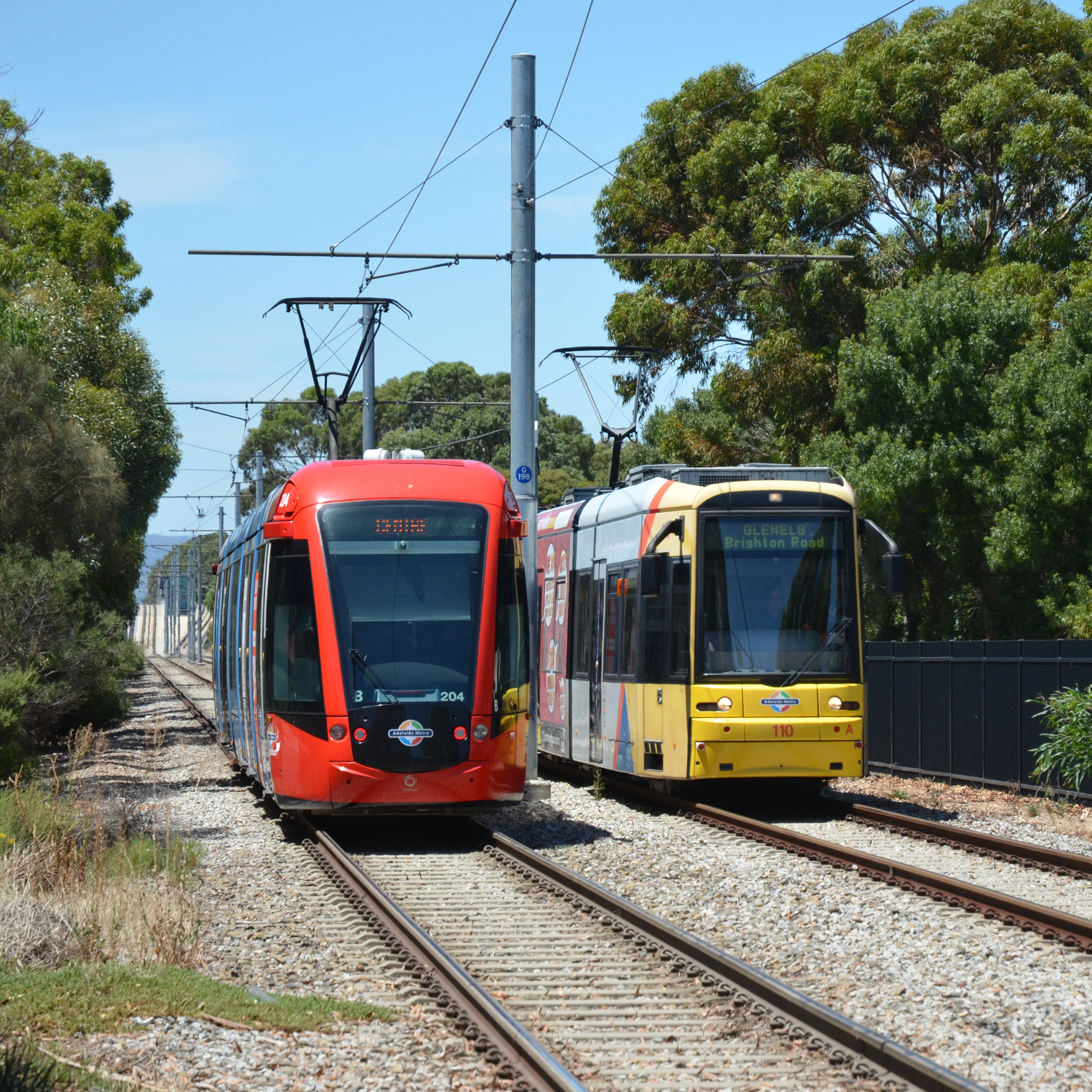
- The two models of tram introduced for Adelaide's tramways revival: 200 Series, Alstom Citadis (left) and 100 Series, Bombardier Flexity Classic, on the 9.25 kilometres (5.75 miles) reserved line between Adelaide and Glenelg

Overview
- Status: Operational
- Website: https://www.adelaidemetro.com.au/timetables/trams

Service
- Type: Street tram operation on new lines, light rail on pre-existing (mostly reserved) line
- Services: Extended from Victoria Square, Adelaide through Adelaide's city centre to: North Terrace just beyond the Morphett Street overpass (October 2007); from there to the Adelaide Entertainment Centre on Port Road, Hindmarsh (March 2010); along North Terrace past the cultural precinct to near East Terrace and the Botanic Garden (October 2018); along King William Road past the Adelaide Festival Centre towards City Bridge (October 2018).
- Ridership: About 9.5 million per year before Covid-19 pandemic; about 9 million after recovery
Operational and technical information
- Opened: New trams on re-engineered Glenelg line 2006
- Owner: SA government agencies: 1994–2010: TransAdelaide, branded from 2000 as "Adelaide Metro"; 2010–present: Department of Planning, Transport and Infrastructure, branded as "Adelaide Metro".
- Depot: Morphett Road, Glengowrie; 34°58′37″S 138°32′13″E
- Rolling stock: From 2006: fifteen 100 Series – Bombardier Flexity Classic; From 2010: nine 200 Series – Alstom Citadis 302; 2006–2015: Decreasing numbers of 300 Series (previously classified Type H) in 2006, then two until 2015.
- Line length: 4.2 km (2.6 mi) of extensions to pre-existing line of 10.8 km (6.7 mi), totalling 16.25 km (10.10 mi). All double.
- Gauge: 1435 mm (4 ft 8 1/2 in)
- Electrification: 600 Volts DC, overhead line

The city of Adelaide had an extensive tramway system running to most of its suburbs. The tram services started with horse trams that from 1878 ran on a network of lines extending eventually to about 100 km (62 mi) in length. Thirty-one years later, starting in 1909, the lines were upgraded and electrified. Forty-nine years after that, in 1958, all street tramlines were closed, leaving only the 11 kilometres (6.8 miles) Glenelg tram line operating. In 2005, major investments in infrastructure and modern trams inaugurated what became a tramways revival, leading to a 50 per cent increase in the route length of the city's tramways, replacement of its trams – by then 48 years old – and quadrupling of ridership.

== Before the revival ==
After the closure of all Adelaide street tram services, the sole surviving route was the 10.8 km (6.7 mi) Glenelg tram line (also known colloquially as the "Bay line"), extending south-west from Adelaide's centre to the beachside suburb of Glenelg. It ran on its own 9.2-kilometre (5.7-mile) reservation as a light rail line except for a street-running section about 800 metres (870 yards) long at each end. Lack of funds to redevelop the reservation into a roadway prompted a decision to keep the line operating for a further ten years until it reached the end of its economic life. Track deteriorated, the condition of the 1929-vintage tramcars declined, and for a time it appeared that part of the line might be resumed for a freeway. However, in the early 1970s the line received a major upgrade and trams were refurbished. Throughout the period, the trams provided a reliable service and enjoyed widespread affection in the community.

After 49 years of uncertainty, the future of the line was secured in 2005, when a major engineering upgrade commenced. In 2006 new trams were delivered to replace the Type H trams that had served the route for 77 years. In 2007 the first route extension, along the main artery of Adelaide's city centre, was undertaken. In readiness for a rise in patronage, more trams were delivered. as of 2019, the number of new trams was 24, further route extensions had been built, and two more routes were being investigated (but did not eventuate).

== 2005–2006 Glenelg line upgrade ==
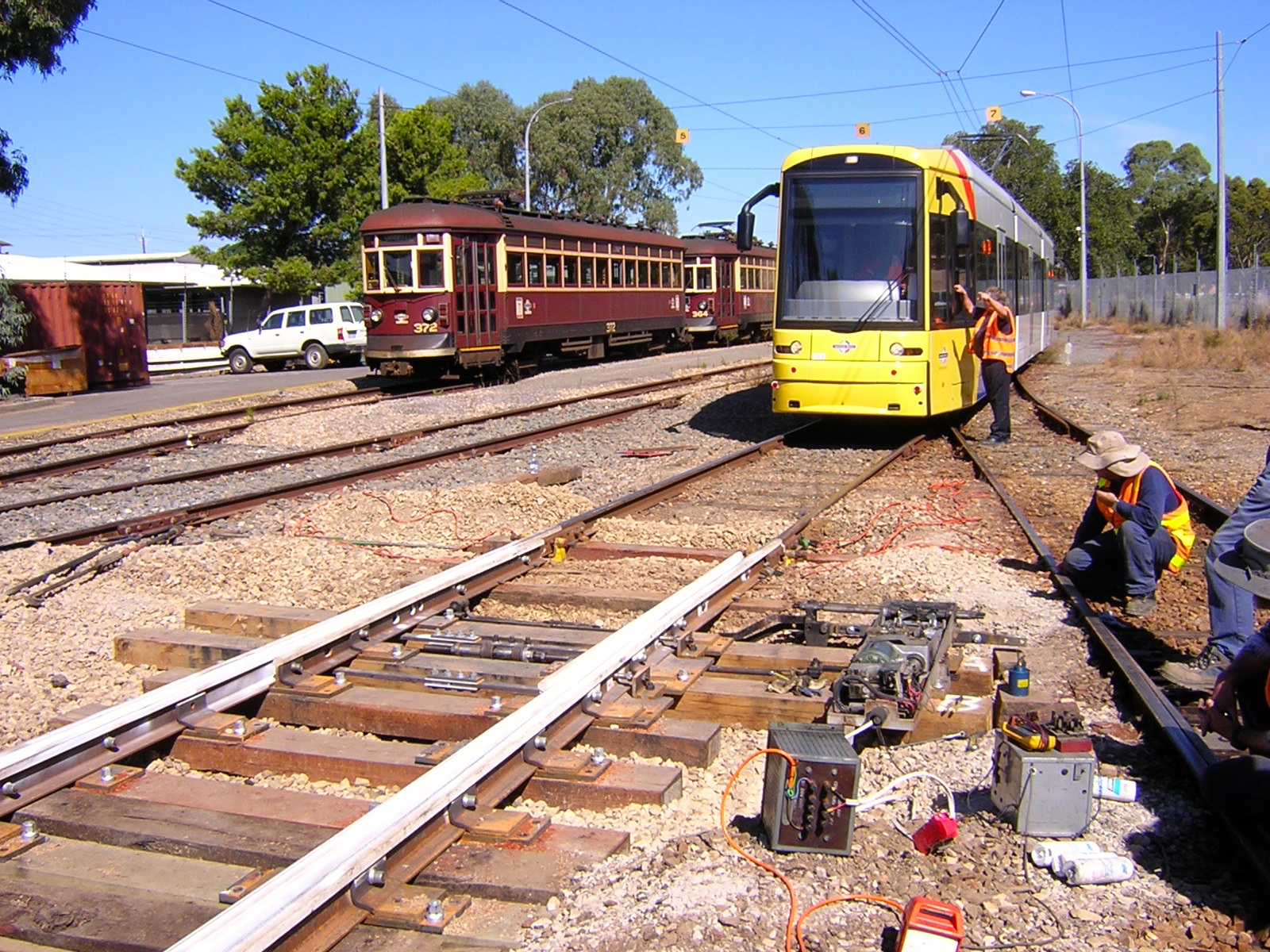
To minimise derailments in the open (non-grooved) trackwork, new switch blades were configured so that the narrowest parts were firmly supported regardless of the direction in which they were set. In April 2006, on temporary track at the Glengowrie depot a 100 Series tram was used in verifying the new configuration.

In 2003 the newly elected Labor government announced the revitalisation of the Glenelg tram line and its intent to purchase modern low-floor vehicles to operate the line.

The first step in the tramways revival was a major upgrade to track and other infrastructure on the Glenelg line costing $22 million, which occurred in 2005–2006.

Coleman Rail (Note: At the time of the Glenelg tram line upgrade and construction of the new line to City West, Coleman Rail Pty Ltd, a private Australian construction company, was a business within the Victorian family-run engineering group Geotech Holdings, which in turn was acquired by Spanish infrastructure group Acciona in 2017. The company designed and constructed the rebuilding of the line from Glenelg to Victoria Square. It also designed and constructed the subsequent new line from Victoria Square to City West on North Terrace.) extensively upgraded 10 kilometres of track; re-built 9 road crossings; built 18 raised-platform tram stops and 41 pedestrian crossings with access mazes and ramps; upgraded electrical and signalling systems, four 600V DC converter stations, a new traction power side-feeder system and overhead wiring; and altered the Glengowrie maintenance depot to accommodate the new trams on order. Overall design, construction, commissioning, and driver and operator training were conducted over a 38-week period. Four years later, in 2009, a major choke point where the tramline crossed diagonally through South Road was eliminated by removing the level crossing and building a tram overpass, which was completed in March 2010.

By the time the new trams were delivered, the line's Type H "Glenelg trams" were 77 years old. After some months of joint operation as the new trams were brought on line, 17 were sold or donated. The remaining five were refurbished in 2000 and two of those – 351 and 352 (formerly 367) – received a further refurbishment in 2012–13 in anticipation of occasional revenue operation, which occurred until 2015 when they were put into storage. The Department for Infrastructure and Transport donated the two to the Tramway Museum, St Kilda in 2021.

Article on the Glenelg trams: Tram types: Type H (later classified 300 Series)

== 2005–2012: 100 Series (Bombardier Flexity Classic) tram deliveries ==
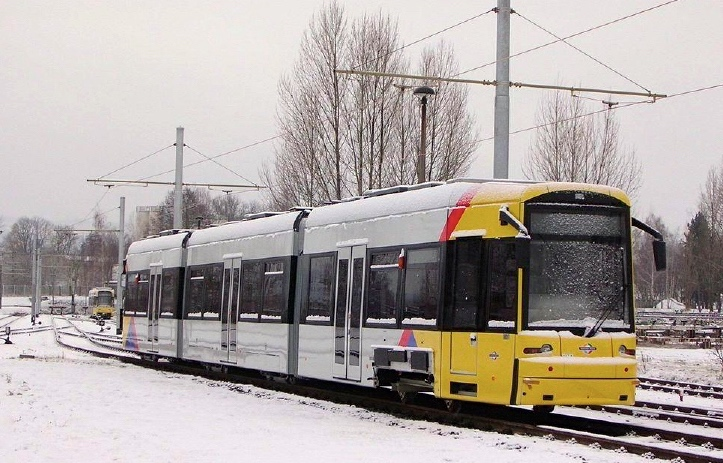
A Bombardier Flexity Classic tram ordered for Adelaide at the Bombardier factory sidings, Bautzen.

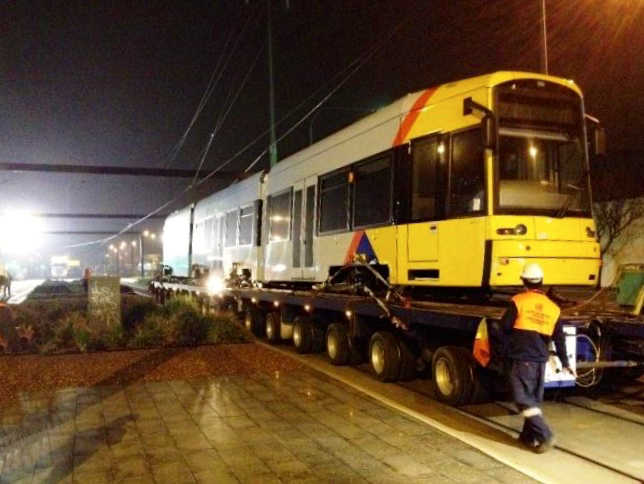
A Bombardier Flexity Classic tram is delivered to tracks outside the Adelaide Entertainment Centre in 2006.

These trams are detailed in the article: Tram types in Adelaide (100 Series)

The contract for nine new Bombardier Flexity Classic trams was awarded to Bombardier Transportation in September 2004. The first was delivered in November 2005 and the remainder – except for one badly damaged in transit, subsequently replaced – between January and September 2006. Designated as the 100 Series, the trams progressively replaced, in 2006, the 21 Type H trams remaining in service out of the original 30 that with a few rare exceptions had operated the Glenelg service exclusively since 1929.

Following the decision to extend the line from Victoria Square along King William Street, a further two Bombardier Flexity Classics were ordered in 2005. They arrived in the first half of 2007. The replacement for the tram damaged before delivery arrived in June.

After the route had been extended through the city centre, the service became very popular: in the three months from November 2007 to the end of January 2008, more than 100,000 extra trips had been taken than in the same period in the previous year. Intensive overcrowding occurred, and many passengers were unable to board trams during peak hours. The route extension was also blamed for increased traffic congestion in the city, although no quantitative evidence was advanced.

In 2016 the transport minister said public perception of trams returning to Adelaide had changed:

"When we announced in 2005 that we would be extending the Glenelg tram past Victoria Square to the railway station there were howls of protest against it. I think we've managed to completely flip the public debate from being against these sorts of projects to be being very strongly in favour."

In the hot Adelaide summer, passengers complained about the inadequacy of air conditioning in the new trams, which originally had been flagged for use in Frankfurt; many of the floor-mounted vents were more suited to heating than cooling. It was found that equipment on the roof and in the undercarriage was overheating and airflow over the outside radiators was inadequate. The air conditioning was progressively upgraded.

Another four 100 Series Bombardier Flexity Classic trams were ordered from Bombardier in June 2008 for the extra traffic to be generated by the projected Adelaide Entertainment Centre extension. They entered service in 2011 and 2012, production having been held up by 100-years flooding of a river next to the Bautzen plant. The total 100 Series fleet was 15 as of 2019.

== 2007 route extension ==
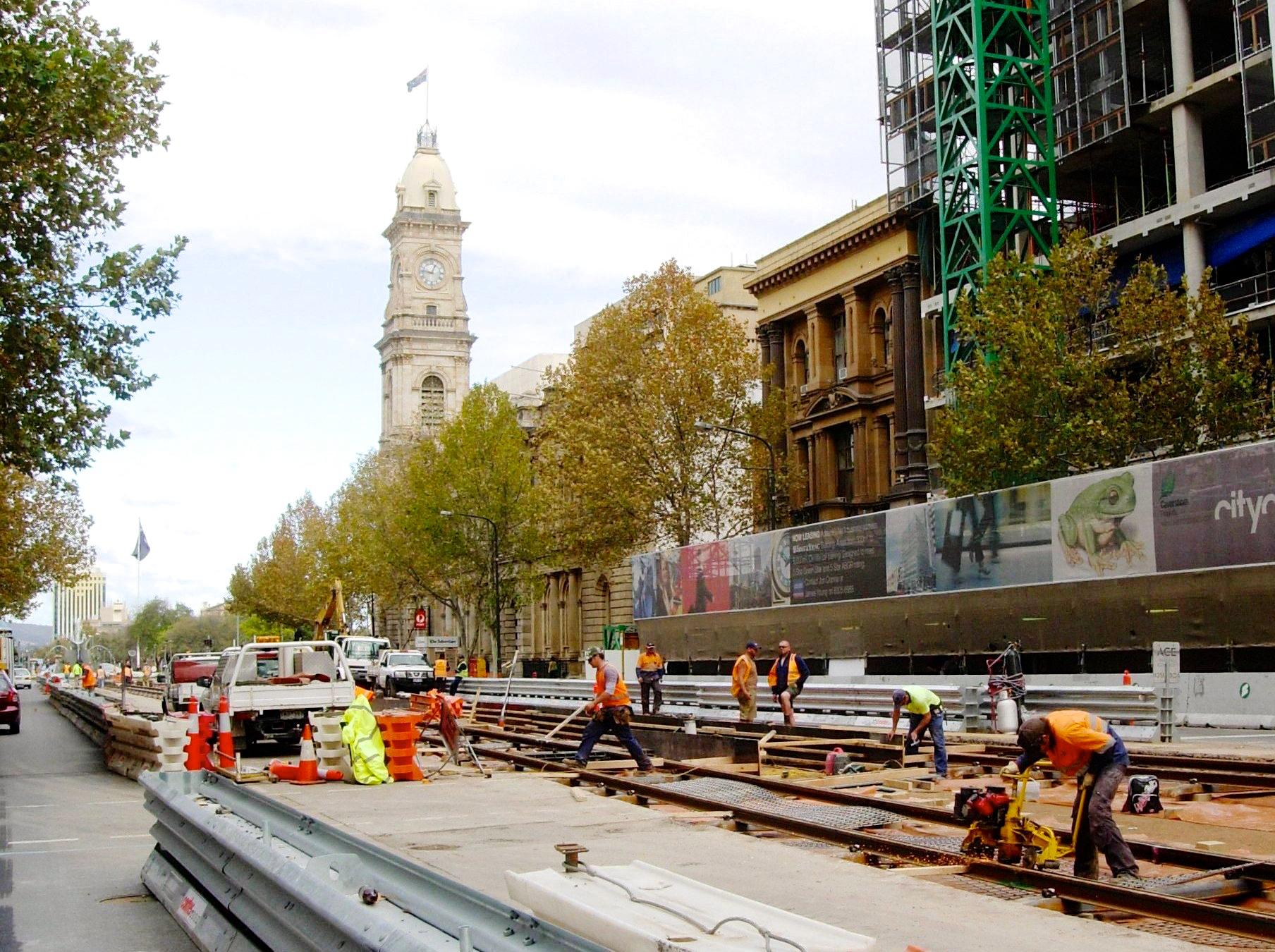
Track construction (as here in King William Street, May 2007) affected public support for trams but soon after services began, passenger numbers exceeded the trams' capacity.

The next step in Adelaide's tramways revival was a 1.2 km (0.75 mi) extension northwards from the Glenelg line terminus in Victoria Square along King William Street into North Terrace. Mid-street stops were built in King William Street and, in North Terrace, at Adelaide railway station and the University of South Australia western city campus 500 metres (550 yards) further west (34°55′04″S 138°35′16″E) – called the "City West" terminus for the time being. The previous Victoria Square terminus, in the centre of the square, had been pulled up and reconstructed on the western side, opening in August 2007. The whole extension was opened in October, enabling through services from Glenelg to the new terminus via the city's principal retail precinct. Fare-free travel was introduced on the new lines within the city centre and from Victoria Square to South Terrace.

Initially the extension was received poorly, but trams quickly became crowded, with patronage levels well above pre-upgrade levels (see the patronage panel below).

The case for further tramway extensions became the subject of public debate. The South Australian tourism minister supported the line being extended to North Adelaide and Prospect. Transport Minister Patrick Conlon, however, considered the idea impracticable, and preferred to have a fare-free city loop.

== 2009 and 2017: 200 Series (Alstom Citadis 302) tram deliveries ==
These trams are detailed in the article: Tram types in Adelaide (200 Series)

Flexity Classic and Citadis 302 specifications compared

	Flexity Classic	Citadis 302
Built	Bautzen, Germany; 2005–6	Barcelona, Spain; 2007
Delivered	2006, 2011–12	2009, 2017
Length	30.0 m	32.0 m
Width	2.40 m	2.40 m
Height	3.50 m	3.60 m
Vehicle mass (tare)	40 tonnes	39 tonnes
Max speed	70 km/h	70 km/h
No. of modules	3	5
No. of bogies	4 (2 of which are powered)	3 (2 of which are powered)
Passenger capacity (peak)	179	186
No. of seats	70	58
No. of doors per side	3	6 (2 of which are single)
Boarding device (ramp)	Built in	Portable
Percentage low floor	70%	100%

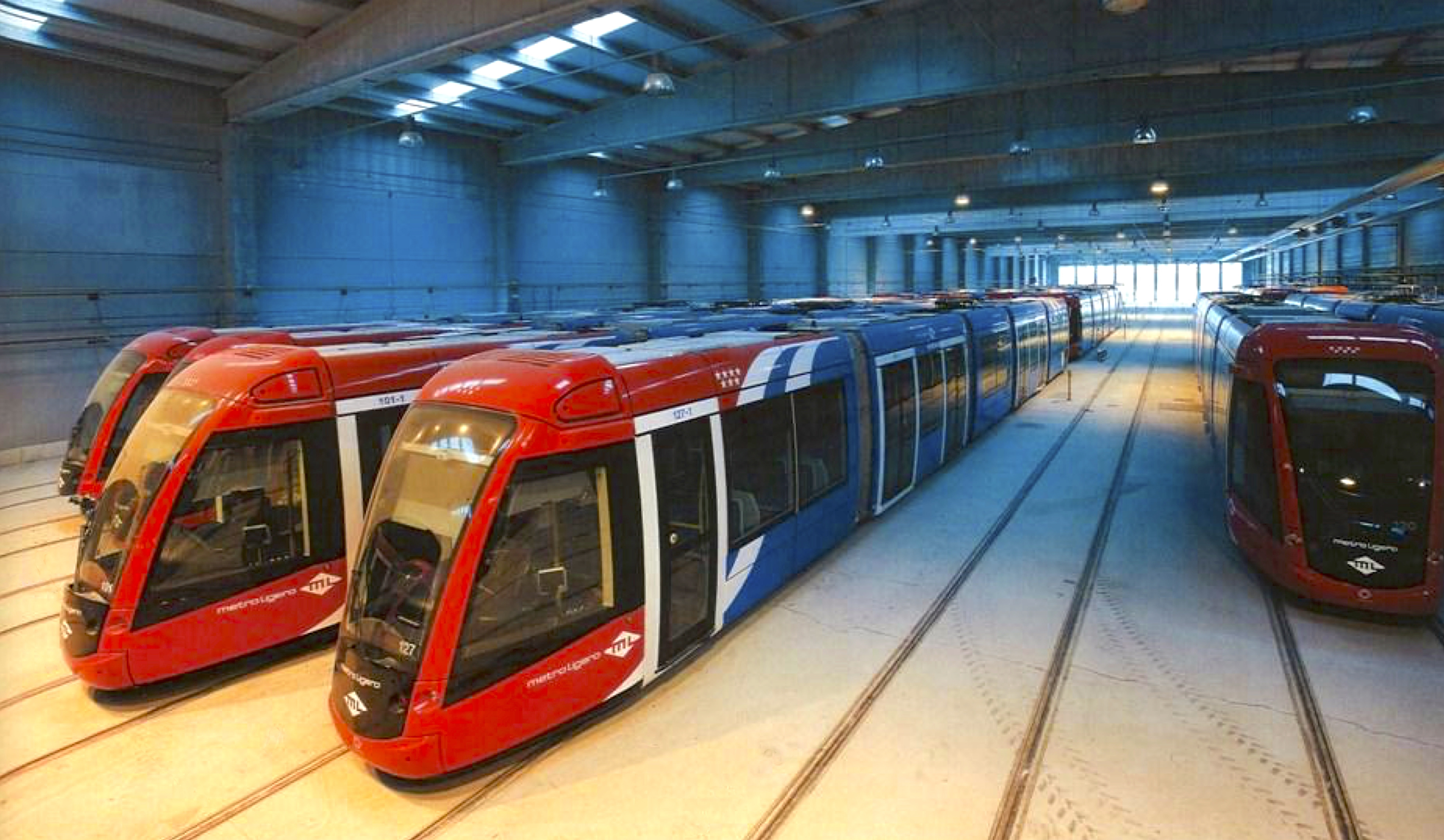
In 2008, financial cutbacks forced Madrid's transit authority to store, then sell, 23 Alstom Citadis 302 trams. The SA government bought six of them.

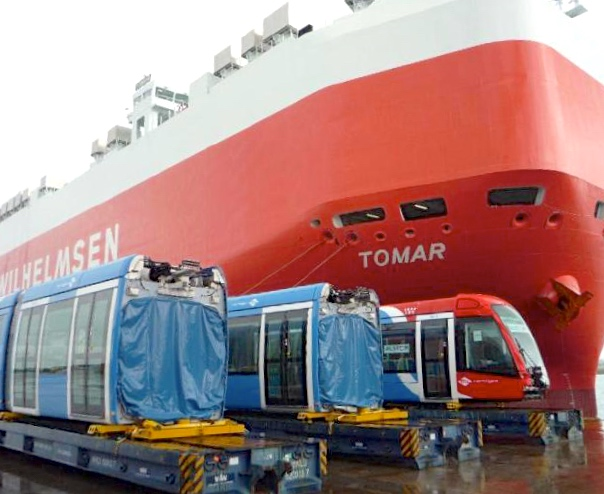
Three segments of an Alstom Citadis 302 tram on a Melbourne wharf, next to the vessel Tomar, on arrival from Spain in 2009.

In mid-2008 the state government issued an international tender call for new or second hand trams in anticipation of the next route extension. Soon, 23 almost new trams were found in Madrid. The city had been in the process of installing new light rail infrastructure but the 2008 financial crisis had caused it to cut back on its plans, resulting in surplus rolling stock. They were five-segment Citadis 302 models manufactured by Alstom for the Metro Ligero in Madrid. The transport minister said that although the $6 million cost for each tram was about the same as buying them new, their prompt arrival would help to avoid capacity problems with the forthcoming route extension. He added that the trams had been built for Madrid's hot climate and the air conditioning was "as good as it gets". The government purchased six of the trams in July 2009.

TransdevTSL – then operators of the Melbourne tram franchise – were engaged to manage transport and modification, commissioning and staff training activities. The trams were delivered by sea to Melbourne Docks, then to its Preston Workshops for modifications before being transported directly into Glengowrie tram depot on 13 November 2009.

In December 2017 a further three Citadis 302 trams were delivered, bringing their numbers to 9 and the total tram fleet to 24.

== 2010 route extension ==
In the 2008 state budget, the government announced that it would further extend the tram line 2.8 km (1.7 mi) north-west to the Adelaide Entertainment Centre, Port Road, Hindmarsh. The line, opened in March 2010, runs from what had been the 2007 terminus on North Terrace, near the railway station, to the Adelaide Entertainment Centre in the inner north-west suburb of Hindmarsh. It also incorporated a park-and-ride service on Port Road.

== 2018 route extensions ==
In December 2016 the state government announced two further extensions:

- One line would extend 900 metres (980 yards) eastwards along North Terrace from the northern end of King William Street to the East End. Stops would be near the South Australian Museum and University of Adelaide, and at a terminus in front of the old Royal Adelaide Hospital near East Terrace and the Botanic Garden.
- A 350-metre line would extend north of North Terrace along King William Road (the northern continuation of King William Street), with a terminus stop outside the Adelaide Festival Centre and the adjacent Elder Park and River Torrens.

The project was budgeted to cost $80 million, to which the Adelaide City Council would contribute $5 million. A joint venture of Downer Rail and York Civil began work in July 2017.

On completion of these extensions in 2018 the total length of Adelaide's tram lines became 16.25 km (10.10 mi) – 50 per cent longer than a decade previously. Details are in the following panel.

Adelaide tram trackage after 2018 extensions (Note: The delineation of trackage in the table is as constructed; this is not the same as tramway "routes" shown in timetables.)
Track	From	Coordinates	To	Coordinates	Built	Length (km)	Length (mi)
Glenelg	Victoria Square	34.9290°S 138.5996°E	Moseley Square	34.9805°S 138.5117°E	1873 (tram line from 1929)	10.81	6.72
King William Street north and North Terrace	Victoria Square	34.9290°S 138.5996°E	North Terrace near Morphett Street overpass	34.9219°S 138.5925°E	2007	1.45	0.90
Adelaide Entertainment Centre (Note: The distance from the King William Street / North Terrace intersection to the Entertainment Centre terminus is 3.36 km (2.09 mi).)	North Terrace near Morphett Street overpass	34.9219°S 138.5925°E	Port Road, Hindmarsh	34.9072°S 138.5749°E	2010	2.73	1.69
Adelaide; Botanic; Garden	KWm / NTce intersection	34.921519°S 138.599404°E	North Tce near intersection with East Tce	34.9210°S 138.6097°E	2018	0.92	0.57
Festival; Plaza	KWm / NTce intersection	34.9215°S 138.5994°E	King Wm Rd: opp. Elder Park past Festival Plaza	34.9184°S 138.5992°E	2018	0.34	0.21
Total trackage:						16.25 km	10.10 mi

=== Controversy: the less-than-grand union ===
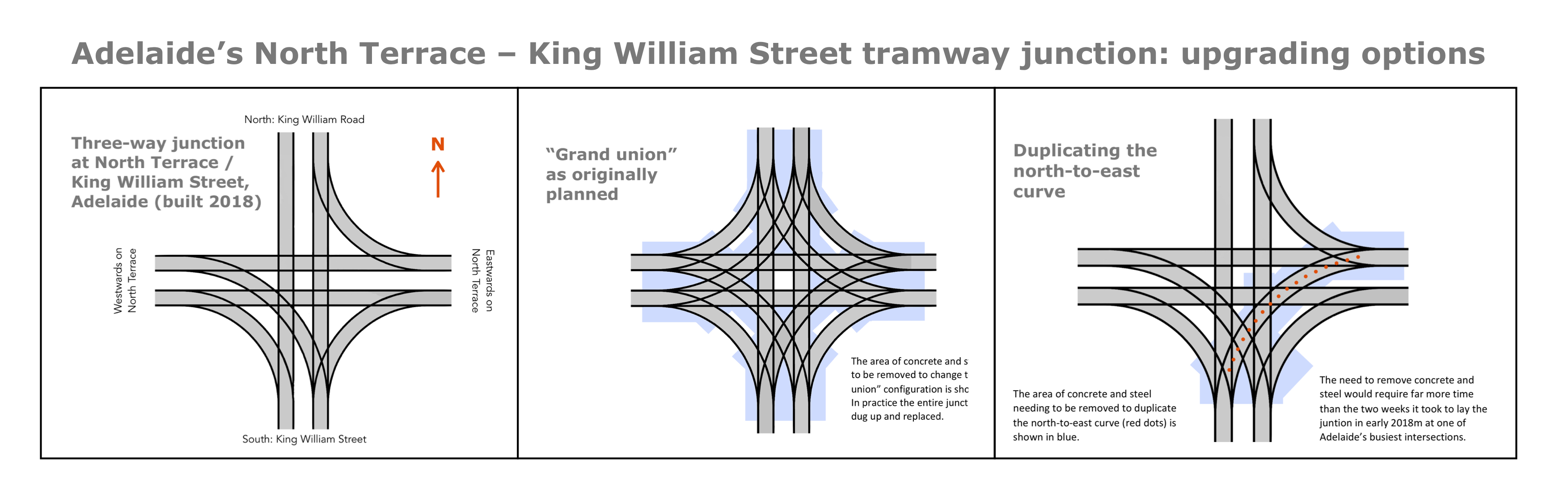
Rebuilding the 3-way tramway intersection laid down in January 2018 (left) to a 4-way one (centre), as proposed by the Liberal government elected in March 2018, would have involved lengthy major roadworks. Duplicating the northwards-to-eastwards curve alone (right) was eventually costed at $47 million plus $70 million for trams with acceptable derailment risks, and the commitment was dropped.

The state government, in December 2016, stated that it recognised track construction work at the very busy North Terrace–King William Street intersection (34°55′17″S 138°35′58″E) would cause disruption of road traffic. The transport minister stressed the desirability of having disruption only once – by building a four-way "grand union" junction rather than a three-way junction that would later have to be modified if what he termed "the offshoot tramline" north to the Festival Centre were to be built later. In the event, however, the government decided to build a junction with double tracks on one corner and single tracks on two corners, saying that the complexity and cost of including a right-hand turn from King William Street into North Terrace could not be justified and would make traffic flows worse. The decision attracted popular ridicule. The reduced junction steelwork, prefabricated, was welded in place and laid in concrete in January 2018.

In the lead-up to the March 2018 state election, the Liberal Party opposition leader described the omission as "stupid and costly", saying that if his party managed to form government, a right-hand turn from King William Street into North Terrace would be added at a cost $37 million.

== Fare-free travel ==
Since financial year 2014–15, (Note: Financial years start on 1 July and end on 30 June in Australia.) travel has been free on the lines that run through streets: in the entire Central Business District and along Jetty Road in Glenelg. On the reserved track sections, only passengers with concessions, such as South Australian Seniors Card holders (during off-peak hours only before July 2022), were carried free (see the Patronage section).

As of July 2022, the policy was expanded so that South Australian Seniors Card holders were able to travel free on Adelaide Metro buses, trains and trams, without time restrictions; the concession required holders to validate their card when boarding.

== Patronage ==
As of July 2025, Adelaide's trams had conveyed 12.5% of Adelaide's public transport passengers during the previous 12 months; the suburban rail network carried 20.1% and buses 67.5%. Patronage of tram track per route kilometre was 4.8 times that of rail. (Note: Trams: 7.49 million passengers carried on 16.3 kilometres (10.1 miles) of track. Trains: 12.06 million passengers on 125.4 kilometres (77.9 miles) of track.)

The route extensions that opened from 2007, although only 5.4 km (3.4 mi) long, mainly served parts of Adelaide city with high vehicular and pedestrian traffic, and thus reduced inner-city traffic congestion. Free tram travel introduced in this area and in the Glenelg shopping precinct during financial year 2014–15 almost quadrupled patronage, with very little increase thereafter until the Covid-19 pandemic severely affected patronage from mid-March 2020. Increased reliability of the new trams (with more than 96 per cent on-time running) was also cited in 2017 as a factor in increased patronage. Patronage started to recover as the pandemic moderated in 2022–23 and Senior Citizen card travel without restriction of journey times started in July 2022.

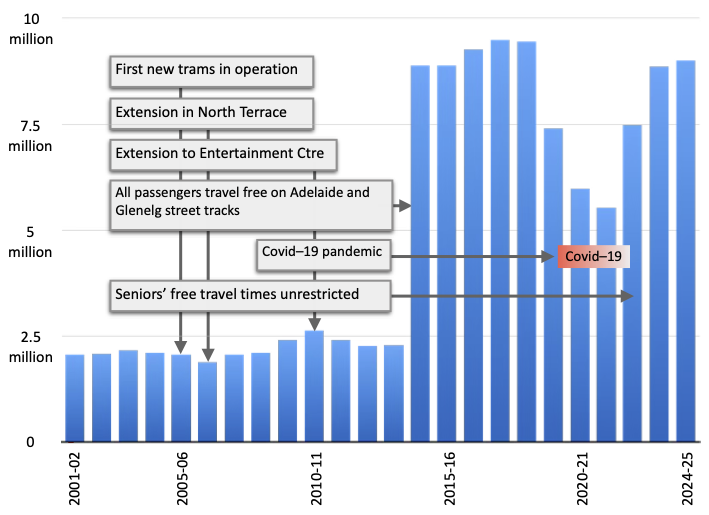
Patronage of Adelaide's trams since financial year 2001-02.

Adelaide tram patronage in detail
Information:	Financial years start on 1 July and end on 30 June; hence the financial year 2024–2025 was 1 July 2024 to 30 June 2025. The numbered notes show major occurrences that affected the number of boardings, including changes to free travel as detailed in the article.									
2000s
Year	Pre-2001	2001-02	2002-03	2003-04	2004-05	2005-06	2006-07	2007-08	2008-09	2009-10
Patronage (millions)	(Unavail- able)	2.07 [note a]	2.08	2.16	2.10 [note b]	2.07 [note c]	1.88	2.06 [note d]	2.11	2.42 [table note e]
References										
Notes for 2000s	Note a: Figures for all years include free travel for South Australian holders of Senior Citizen card. Note b: Line was closed for upgrading during June 2005. Note c: Line was closed for upgrading during July 2005. Note d: Extension to University of SA, North Terrace, opened in October 2007. Note e: Extension to Adelaide Entertainment Centre opened in March 2010.									
2010s
Year	2010-11	2011-12	2012-13	2013-14	2014-15	2015-16	2016-17	2017-18	2018-19	2019-20
Patronage (millions)	2.63	2.42	2.27	2.29	8.88 [note f]	8.89	9.26	9.48	9.45	7.40 [note g]
References										
Notes for 2010s	Note f: From FY 2014–2015 all free travel was included (previously only free travel by South Australian holders of Senior Citizen cards was included). Note g: The Covid-19 pandemic severely affected patronage from mid-March 2020.									
2020s
Year	2020-21	2021-22	2022-23	2023-24	2024-25	2025-26	2026-27	2027-28	2028-29	2029-30
Patronage (millions)	5.99 [note h]	5.53 [note h]	7.49 [notes i & j ]	8.87	9.01					
References										
Notes for 2020s	Note h: The Covid-19 pandemic continued to severely affect patronage through financial years 2020-21 and 2021–22. Note i: The Covid-19 pandemic affected patronage less severely through financial year 2022–23 than in 2020-21 and 2021–22. Note j: From FY 2022–23, includes unlimited Senior Citizen card travel; started on 1 July 2022.									

== Plans for further route extensions ==
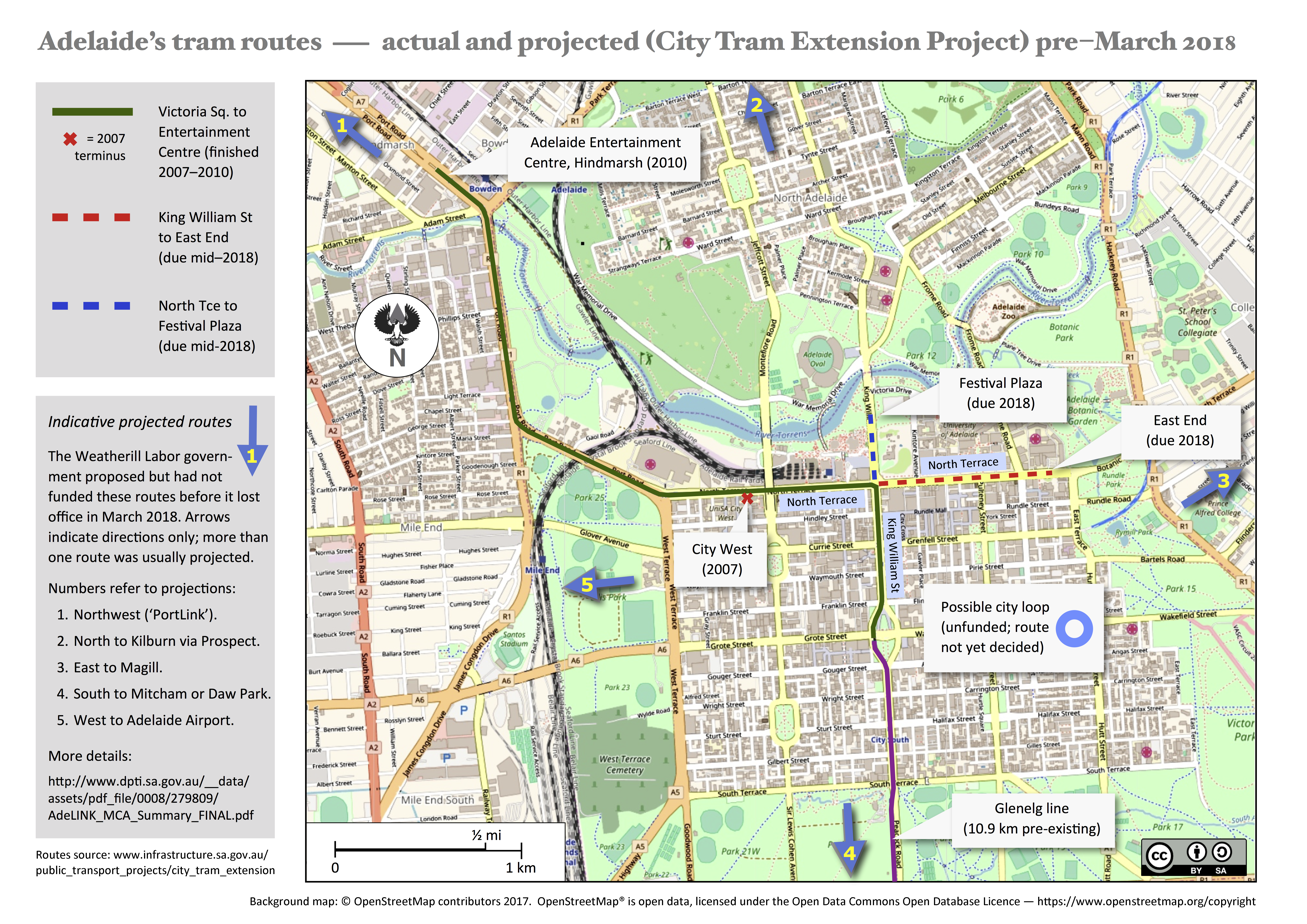
The wide-ranging tramway system that the South Australian Labor Party envisaged for its "City Tramline Extension Project" before it lost government in March 2018. (Click to enlarge.)

Labor Party policy

During its 16 years in office until it lost office in the March 2018 state elections, the Labor government had announced plans for Adelaide's public transport only to drop them from a later budget. In the 2008 budget, as part of a planned electrification of the Outer Harbor and Grange railway lines, new tram-trains were proposed to run on existing railway lines to West Lakes, Port Adelaide and Semaphore. Electrification of the Outer Harbor railway line was to commence in 2010–11 and "once connected to the tram network, will enable future extensions of light rail services to West Lakes, Semaphore and Port Adelaide". However, the plans were abandoned in the 2012 state budget. As at 2019 the railway line had not been electrified, hence no tram-trains were operating.

In 2016 the government released a report detailing an ambitious tramways network, branded as "AdeLINK". Five routes would radiate from a new city centre loop:

- an eastern EastLINK route to Magill
- a northern ProspectLINK route to Kilburn
- a southern UnleyLINK route to either Mitcham or Daw Park
- a western WestLINK route to Adelaide Airport
- a number of north-western PortLINK routes.

A loop in the CBD, to be called CityLINK, was also included.

The PortLINK proposal included replacement of the existing diesel-traction Outer Harbor railway line's heavy rail service with electrified light rail, repeating the abandoned 2008 proposal to extend to West Lakes, Port Adelaide and Semaphore.

In the face of criticism, the transport minister in December 2016 blamed the Liberal federal government's lack of support of state public transport for the stalled investment in the Adelaide tramway system, saying his party "had a commitment from the federal opposition that had they won at the recent federal election they would have committed half a billion dollars to expanding the network." No further provision for expenditure ensued. The proposal met with strong opposition from Norwood residents and traders concerned about the removal of trees in the median strip of The Parade at Norwood and the likely reduction in street parking. A motorists' organisation travel-time survey identified increasing tram traffic as a major contributor to congestion on three major Adelaide roads; it called for the government's Integrated Transport and Land Use Plan to include the effect of increased tram services to address population growth, encourage the use of public transport, and consider its effect on motorists and what was needed to mitigate it.

In the campaign for the March 2018 state elections, another Labor proposal – taken from its 2015 plan for projecting tram services along The Parade (Norwood), Unley Road, Prospect Road, and via Henley Beach Road to Adelaide Airport – was to build the line to Norwood, the electorate of the opposition leader. This would involve a 3 km (1.9 mi) line from the East End of Adelaide through Kent Town and the purchase of four new trams at a total cost of $259 million.

Liberal Party policy

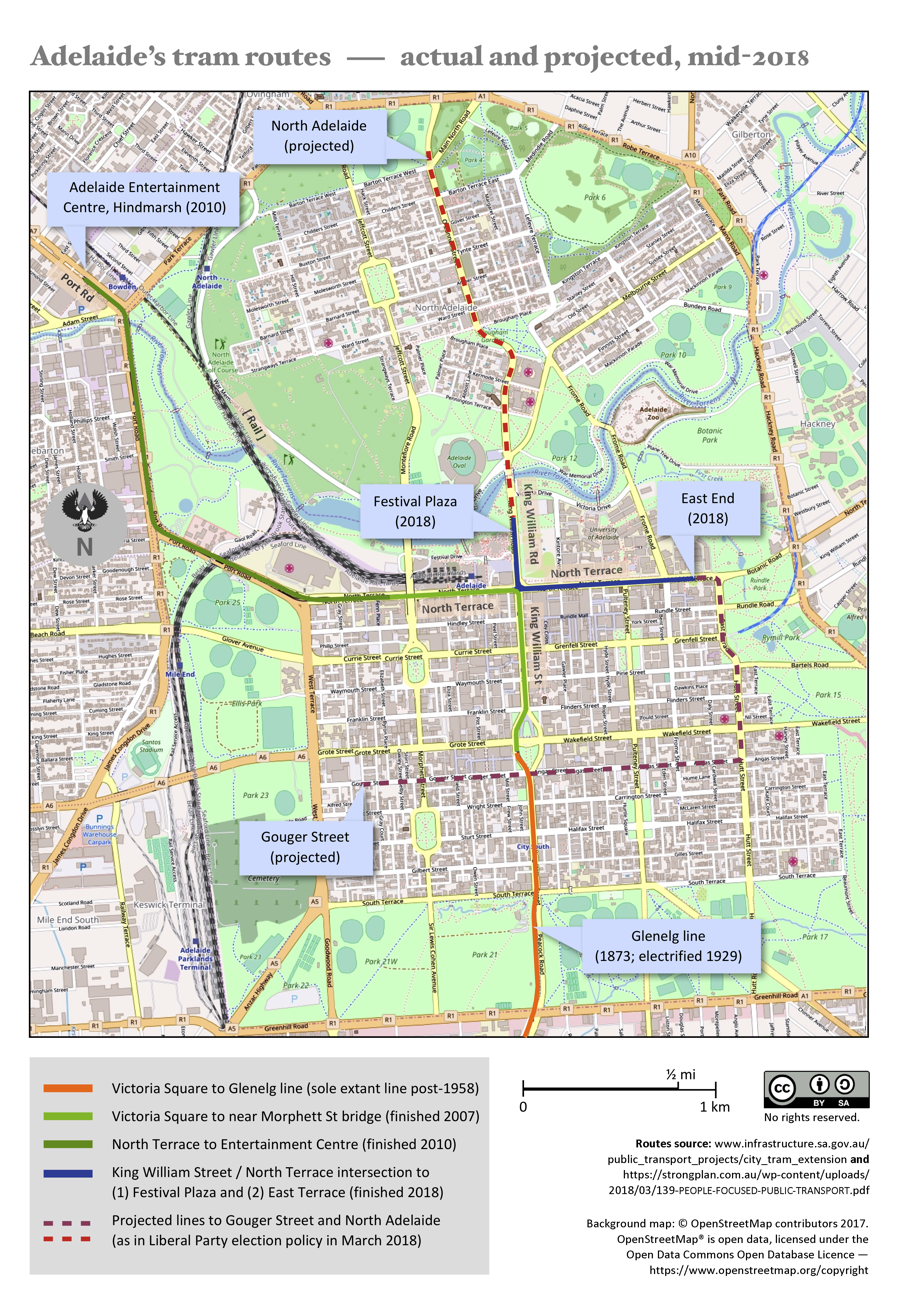
The conservative tramway system promised by the Liberal Party government elected in March 2018 was focused on the city centre of Adelaide and North Adelaide, rather than nearby suburbs. (Click map to enlarge.)

In the lead-up to the March 2018 state elections the Liberal Party put forward a conservative fiscal platform. The party's public transport manifesto stated that its focus would be on extending tram services in the city centre rather than building wider routes as in the Labor Party's plan. Nevertheless, the Liberal Party described its over-all public transport plan (of which tramways are a part) as "designed to make Adelaide’s public transport the equal of similar sized cities anywhere in the world". The manifesto included plans for two new tram routes, both similar to those included in earlier plans by the Labor party:

- a route from the eastern end of North Terrace through the eastern half of the city then west along Angas Street and Gouger Street
- an extension from North Terrace to O'Connell Street, North Adelaide.

The manifesto also included pledges to:

- set up an independent body, Infrastructure South Australia, to provide a strategic approach to infrastructure planning and development in order to lift economic productivity and to make "transparent" decisions that are not based on "short-term political imperatives"
- submit the proposed tram service routes for a comprehensive assessment by Infrastructure South Australia
- remove public transport operations from the large Department of Planning, Transport and Infrastructure by creating the South Australian Public Transport Authority; DPTI would continue to be responsible for infrastructure delivery, and Infrastructure South Australia for public transport infrastructure planning
- correct at an estimated cost of $37 million, in a Liberal government first term, the previous government's "fundamental flaw" in omitting the right-hand turn from King William Street into North Terrace at the intersection laid three months earlier
- remove overhead lines from tram routes in the Adelaide CBD.

== Developments since the 2018 election ==
The Liberal Party formed government on 19 March 2018 and its manifesto became the framework for government policy.

On 6 August 2018, Adelaide-headquartered company York Civil, which had constructed some of Adelaide's significant infrastructure projects and had partnered with Downer EDI Works Limited as a joint venture to build the tram extension along North Terrace to the East End, went into voluntary administration.

On 7 August, the premier conceded that an election pledge to build the right-hand turn on to North Terrace would not meet its stated 12-month deadline. He blamed the previous government, saying it "didn't make it clear before the election just how badly derailed that project was .... The tram issue is just a continuing problem … more trouble than the early settlers". His transport minister said further work would depend on a departmental review to be completed in October, when engineering advice would clarify the next steps forward, but "we are committed to delivering our election commitments".

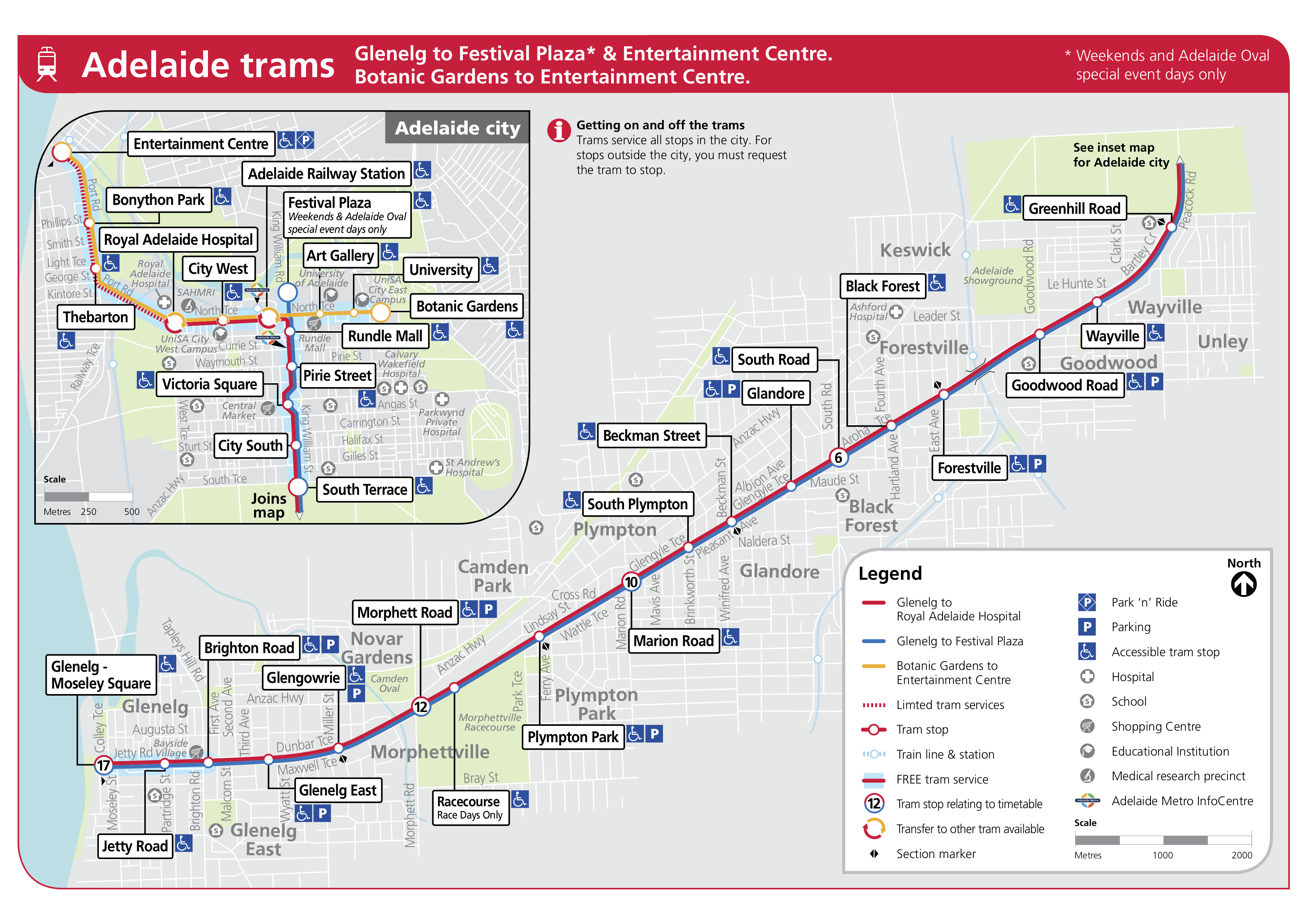
Adelaide Metro tramway routes in 2019. (Click map to enlarge.)

On 3 October 2018 trams began operating over the 900 metre (980 yard) extension along the remainder of North Terrace and its cultural precinct, to the Botanic Garden, and the 350 metre (380 yard) extension along King William Road past the Adelaide Festival Centre, running only on weekends and for special events.

In November 2018, after receiving expert advice from engineering consultancy Aurecon Australasia, the government withdrew its commitment to build the right-hand turn, citing an increased cost estimate (to more than $117 million, including $70 million to purchase and operate trams that could negotiate the bend); the unacceptable derailment risks to Citadis trams because of the gradients involved; and the necessity for the very busy intersection to be shut down for 8 to 10 weeks.

In January 2019 the transport minister stated that the government needed to finalise a claims process with contractor Downer Group on the North Terrace and King William Road extensions before an external review of cost over-runs and would be completed. He also alluded to the impending establishment of the South Australian Public Transport Authority, which "will inform the development of a comprehensives public transport strategy that is customer focused, more reliable, accessible and better suit[s] the needs of South Australians".

Adelaide is the only Australian capital city to have a publicly funded and operated tram system. In July 2019, the South Australian government announced plans to contract the operation of Adelaide's train and tram services. The government would still own and control rail assets, including trains, trams, tracks and stations, and would continue to set the fare price for travel. It acknowledged, however, that although tram patronage had increased by 7 per cent between the financial years 2015–16 and 2017–18, and on trains by 3 per cent, Adelaide's public transport network was underperforming. It had one of the lowest patronage levels in the country, and surveys revealed that customers wanted a better level of services than was currently provided.

Links to other articles about Adelaide tramways are accessible by clicking [show]in the panel at the beginning of this article.

== See also ==
- Trams in Adelaide
- Trams in Australia
- Transport in Adelaide
- Transport in South Australia
- List of public transport routes in Adelaide
