= Henry Littlefield =

Author and historian

Henry M. Littlefield (June 12, 1933 – March 30, 2000) was an American educator, author and historian most notable for his claim that L. Frank Baum's The Wonderful Wizard of Oz was a political satire, founding a long tradition of political interpretations of this book. He wrote an essay about his theory for his high-school students in Mount Vernon, New York, and published it in the American Quarterly in 1964.

Littlefield was also a well-known wrestling coach at Mt. Vernon High School and Amherst College. Author John Irving served as an informal assistant coach at Amherst, and mentioned Littlefield in his essay-cum-memoir, "Trying to Save Piggy Sneed." On page 118, Irving wrote, “Henry Littlefield was the coach at Amherst then; Henry was a heavyweight—everything about him was grand. He was more than expansive, he was eloquent; he was better than good-humored, he was jolly. Henry was very rare, a kind of Renaissance man among wrestling coaches, and the atmosphere in the Amherst wrestling room was, to Henry’s credit, both aggressive and good-natured—a difficult combination to achieve.”

Littlefield served as dean of students at Amherst, leaving that position in 1976 to become headmaster of the York School in Monterey, California. He also taught at Golden Gate University, Naval Postgraduate School, and the Stevenson School.

Littlefield received his B.A. from Columbia College, and his M.A. and Ph.D. from Columbia University. During his studies, he also served as an officer in the Marine Corps from 1954 to 1958. At Columbia, he played in the Varsity Show and attended the American Theatre Wing with the intention of becoming an actor.

He died on March 30, 2000.
