= York (ship) =

Several ships have been named York for York:

- York (1783 ship) was launched in 1783 at Archangel. She traded with Northern Russia until 1792 when the Sierra Leone Company purchased her for use as a storeship. She was burnt at Sierra Leone late in 1793.
- York (1819 ship) was a sailing ship built in 1819 at Southwick. She made one voyage to Bombay for the British East India Company (EIC) in 1820. She made three voyages transporting convicts to Australia between 1829 and 1832. She was condemned and sold for breaking up in 1833 at Mauritius.

== See also ==
- York (East Indiaman)
- HMS York – any one of ten vessels of the Royal Navy
- USS York
