= Dry Creek explosives tramway =

Railway in South Australia

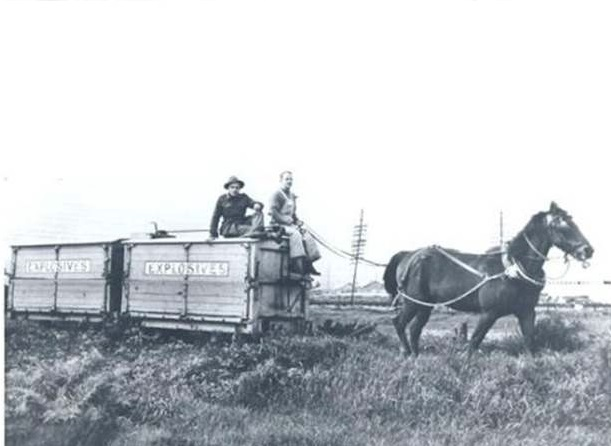
- Horse-drawn wagons for carrying explosives in the Dry Creek explosives depot

Overview
- Status: Closed and removed

History
- Opened: 1906
- Closed: 1964

Technical
- Line length: 2 km (1.2 mi)
- Track gauge: 610 mm (2 ft)

The Dry Creek explosives tramway was a 610 mm (2 ft) gauge tramway located in the suburb of Dry Creek. Running for 2 kilometres from a depot to the landing jetty a distance of 2 kilometres (1.2 miles), and on the other side 800 metres (870 yards) to the Dry Creek railway station, it was built to transport explosives such as dynamite to the magazines at Dry Creek which replaced the one at North Arm. A wharf with 2 foot tramway to the magazine was built to replace road transport in 1904.

The flow of traffic began as water cargo coming in via Broad Creek, to eventually one of cargo arriving by rail at Dry Creek and being shipped in and out via another lasting symbol of the tramway, ‘The Cut’ at the northern end of Torrens Island. The last explosives were shipped from Broad Creek in 1970, and the jetty itself was demolished around 1976. The line was operated by six small horse-drawn wagons of 1.25 long tons (1.27 metric tons) capacity.

In 1964, safety concerns due to the encroachment of industry into the area led to the closure of the tramway. The tramway tracks were pulled up and sold two years later.
