= York University (disambiguation) =

York University is a university in Toronto, Ontario, Canada.

== Transit stations ==
- York University station, a subway station and adjacent bus terminal serving the university
- York University GO Station, a former commuter rail station near the university

== Universities ==
=== United Kingdom ===
- University of York, York, England
- York St John University, a university in York, England formerly College of Ripon and York St John

=== United States ===
- York University (Nebraska), York, Nebraska

== See also ==
- York College & University Centre, York, England
- York College (disambiguation)
- York School (disambiguation)
