= Yorke Peninsula (disambiguation) =

Yorke Peninsula is a peninsula in South Australia.

Yorke Peninsula may refer to:

- District Council of Yorke Peninsula (1888–1969), a former local government area
- Electoral district of Yorke Peninsula, a former electorate
- Yorke Peninsula Council, a local government area
- Yorke Peninsula Country Times, a newspaper
- Yorke Peninsula Football League, an Australian rules football league

== See also ==
- York (disambiguation)
