= York North (disambiguation) =

York North was a federal riding in Ontario, Canada, that was in the House of Commons of Canada from 1867 until 2004.

York North may also refer to:

- York North (New Brunswick provincial electoral district)
- York North (Ontario provincial electoral district)

== See also ==
- North York (disambiguation)
