= Battle of York (disambiguation) =

Battle of York is an 1813 battle in the War of 1812 at Fort York and York, Upper Canada, Canada

Battle of York may also refer to:

- Battle of York (867), Northumbria, island of Great Britain; Viking Wars
- Sack of York (1069), England, island of Great Britain; part of the Harrying of the North in the Norman Conquest
- Siege of York (1644), England, island of Great Britain; English Civil War

== See also ==
- Battle of York Factory (disambiguation)
- Battle of New York (disambiguation)
- York (disambiguation)
