= North York (disambiguation) =

North York is a dissolved municipality within the city of Toronto, Ontario, Canada.

- North York Centre, a district of Toronto, Ontario, Canada
  - North York Centre (TTC), a subway station in North York Centre
- North York (electoral district)

North York may also refer to:

== Places ==
=== America ===
- North York, Pennsylvania
- North York, Wisconsin

=== Britain ===
- North York Moors, England
- North Yorkshire, England

== See also ==
- York North (disambiguation)
