= List of ships named City of York =

Several ships have been named City of York, including:

- City of York (barque), a three-masted full-rigged ship, later barque, built in 1869 and wrecked in 1899
- City of York (1903), a passenger-cargo liner of Ellerman Lines, scrapped in 1937
- MS City of York. a passenger-cargo liner, built in 1953, and later the ferry Mediterranean Sky

== See also ==
- List of ships named City of New York
