= York College =

York College may refer to:

== United Kingdom ==
- York College & University Centre, formerly York College, York, England
- York College for Girls (1908–1997), York, England
- University of York, York, England

== United States ==
- York College, City University of New York, Jamaica, New York
- York College (Nebraska), York, Nebraska
- York College of Pennsylvania, York, Pennsylvania
- York County Community College, Wells, Maine
- York Technical College, Rock Hill, South Carolina

== See also ==
- York School (disambiguation)
- York University (disambiguation)
