= West York =

West York may refer to:

- West York, Illinois
- West York, Pennsylvania
- West York Island in the South China Sea
