= York Airport =

York Airport may refer to:

- York General Airport (previously RAF Elvington), North Yorkshire, United Kingdom. (IATA: QQY; ICAO: EGYK)
- York Airport (Pennsylvania) in York, Pennsylvania, United States (FAA/IATA: THV)
- York Aerodrome in York, Ontario, Canada (TC: CPP6)
- York Municipal Airport in York, Nebraska, United States (FAA: JYR)
