= York (East Indiaman) =

Between 1740 and 1778, four ships named York, for York, served the British East India Company (EIC) as Indiamen:

- York (1740 EIC ship) made four voyages for the EIC before she was broken up in 1751.
- York (1753 EIC ship) made two voyages for the EIC before she stranded and broke up in 1758.
- York (1760 EIC ship) made four voyages for the EIC. She was sold in 1772 and was last listed in 1779.
- York (1773 EIC ship) made five voyages for the EIC. She was sold in 1788 and served as a transport until 1794.

In addition:

- York (1819 ship) made one voyage for the EIC between 1819 and 1820.
- Pigot (1763 EIC ship) was renamed York after she was sold and was still sailing under that name until 1782.
