= York High School =

York High School may refer to:

- York High School, York, North Yorkshire, England
- York High School (George), George, South Africa
- York High School (Maine), Maine, United States
- York Middle/High School, Retsof, New York, United States
- York High School (Virginia), York County (Yorktown address), Virginia, United States
- York Community High School, Elmhurst, Illinois, United States
- York Comprehensive High School, York, South Carolina, United States
- York Catholic High School, York, Pennsylvania, United States
