= Little York =

Little York may refer to:

- Little York, California, USA
- Little York, Illinois, USA
- Little York, Indiana, USA
- Little York, Hunterdon County, New Jersey
- Little York, New York, a hamlet in Cortland County
- Little York, Ohio, a part of Butler Township, Montgomery County, Ohio
- Little York Road, a street in Houston, Texas, USA
