= Battle of New York =

Battle of New York usually refers to a major battle depicted in the 2012 Marvel Cinematic Universe film The Avengers.

Battle of New York may also refer to:

== Warfare ==
- New York and New Jersey campaign, a series of battles for control of New York City and the state of New Jersey in the American Revolutionary War in 1776 and early 1777
- Saratoga campaign, an attempt by the British high command for North America to gain military control of Hudson River valley during the American Revolutionary War in 1777
- The southern front of the 2024–2025 Battle of Toretsk, centered around the Ukrainian village of New York

== Sports ==
- Knicks–Nets rivalry, a rivalry between the New York Knicks and Brooklyn Nets of the National Basketball Association
- Islanders–Rangers rivalry, a rivalry between the New York Islanders and New York Rangers of the National Hockey League

== Other uses ==
- In the Battle for New York, a novel by H. Irving Hancock

== See also ==
- Battle of York (disambiguation)
- New York (disambiguation)
