= York (1773 EIC ship) =

History

Great Britain
- Name: York
- Namesake: York
- Owner: 1773:Sir Richard Hotham; 1788:Hall & Co.
- Operator: British East India Company
- Builder: Bowater, Woolwich
- Launched: 16 October 1773
- Fate: Last listed 1794
- Notes: Teak-built

General characteristics
- Tons burthen: 758, or 79466/94 (bm)
- Length: Overall:148 ft 4 1/2 in (45.2 m); Keel:120 ft 6 1/2 in (36.7 m) or 110 ft 11 in (33.8 m)
- Beam: 36 ft 9 1/2 in (11.2 m) or 36 ft 8 in (11.2 m)
- Depth of hold: 14 ft 6 in (4.4 m) or 14 ft 8 in (4.5 m)
- Propulsion: Sail
- Notes: Three decks

York was launched in 1773 as an East Indiaman' She then made five voyages for the British East India Company (EIC) between 1773 and 1787. She then became a general merchantman and was last listed in 1794.

== EIC Voyage #1 (1773-1785) ==
Captain George Hayter sailed York from the Downs on 24 December 1773, bound for St Helena and Bencoolen. She reached St Helena on 15 April 1774, and arrived at Benkulen on 21 August. She then sailed around the region. On 21 October she was at Saloomah (Note: Saloomah, or Saloomale; on the coast of Sumatra between Fort Marlborough and Manna Point. Now Pasarseluma, Seluma Selatan (4.139799°S 102.517656°E)) on 16 November at Pring, (Note: Pring was a pepper port some 16 miles northwest of Manna Point, on the west coast of Sumatra.) and on 5 December at Manna. (Note: Manna Point or Town, southeast of Bengkulu, is on the west coast of Sumatra; now Mana 4.484947°S 102.899207°E.) On 18 January 1775 she visited Baatavia before returning to Benkulen on 21 March. Homeward bound, York reached St Helena on 11 July, and arrived back at the Downs on 8 October.

On her return Hayter received criticism for his handling of the voyage. He published a rebuttal but never served as master of an EIC vessel again.

== EIC voyage #2 (1777-1778 ==
On 20 April 1777 Captain John Atkinson Blanshard sailed York from Portsmouth, bound for Bombay. She reached Johanna on 14 September, and arrived at Bombay on 16 November. She then cruised the Malabar coast. On 28 January 1778 she was at Onore, and on 2 and 4 February at Tellicherry. On 7 February she was at Anjengo (Note: Site of Anchuthengu Fort, and EIC factory (1684-1813)) and on 16 February at Cochin. She then returned to Tellicherry (22 February), Onore (1 March), and Bombay (2 April). Homeward bound, she left Bombay on 29 April, reached Tellicherry on 6 May and St Helena on 26 August, and arrived at the Downs on 30 December.

== EIC voyage #3 (1780-1781) ==
Captain Blanshard sailed from Portsmouth on 12 February 1780, bound for Madras and China. York reached Johanna on 22 June and Madras on 22 July. She arrived at Whampoa anchorage on 9 October. Homeward bound, she crossed the Second Bar on 28 January 1781, reached Balambangan on 1 March and St Helena on 25 June, and arrived at the Downs on 20 October.

== EIC voyage #4 (1783-1784) ==
Blanshard left Portsmouth on 11 March 1783, again bound for Madras and China. York reached São Tiago on 4 April, and Madras on 22 July. She arrived at Oct Whampoa on 6 October. Homeward bound, she crossed the Second Bar on 9 January 1784, reached St Helena on 28 April, and arrived at the Downs on 12 July.

== EIC voyage #5 (1786-1787) ==
Captain William Huddart sailed from the Downs on 5 March 1786, bound for St Helena and China. York reached St Helena on 7 June and arrived at Whampoa on 7 December. Homeward bound, she crossed the Second Bar on 25 March 1787, reached St Helena on 23 August, and arrived at the Downs on 31 October. Captain Huddart died on 29 March, soon after setting off from China, "after a long and painful illness".

== Transport ==
Her owners sold York in 1788 to Hall & Co., for use as a transport. She underwent repairs in 1789. She then returned to service in 1790 with Shackles, master, and traded London-Madeira. She was last listed in Lloyd's Register in 1794, still with Shackles, master.
