= York Civil =

Australian construction company

- Company type: Private
- Industry: Engineering and construction
- Founded: 1990; 35 years ago
- Founder: Ian Tarbotton
- Defunct: 13 August 2018
- Fate: Voluntary administration
- Headquarters: Adelaide, South Australia, Australia
- Areas served: South Australia, Queensland, New South Wales, Western Australia
- Products: Engineering, Construction, Project management
- Owners: Ian Tarbotton, Dominic Vieceli
- Number of employees: 400 (2013)
- Website: www.yorkcivil.com.au

York Civil was a South Australian construction and civil engineering company based in Adelaide, South Australia. It was founded in 1990 by Ian Tarbotton, who remains an owner and director along with Dominic Vieceli. It began with only 10 employees, but said it had over 400 by 2017 with offices in four states and 190 when it was wound up in August 2018.

== Major projects ==
- Blanchetown Bridge
- Northern Expressway
- Partner with CPB Contractors and Aurecon in the T2T Alliance which built the Torrens Road to River Torrens section of the North-South Corridor freeway bypass of Adelaide.
- York Civil was the prime contractor for extending the Adelaide tram network along North Terrace including the major junction at King William Street, in joint venture with Downer Rail.
- Partner with Rizzani de Eccher to build the Matagarup Bridge in Perth
- 2012 rebuild of Elizabeth railway station

== Winding up ==
York Civil entered voluntary administration in August 2018. Its directors appointed Ferrier Hodgson as administrators on the morning of 6 August 2018. Ferrier Hodgson reported that work would continue on projects while the business was reviewed. A creditors meeting is scheduled for 16 August 2018. York Civil said it had 131 staff in South Australia, 32 in New South Wales, 19 in Western Australia and four in Queensland. A week after the administrators took over, Ferrier Hodgson announced on 13 August that the company had ceased trading. Joint venture partners were expected to continue to work on major infrastructure projects in Western Australia (Matagarup Bridge), South Australia (tram line extension and two sections of North–South Corridor) and New South Wales (Pacific Highway upgrades). At the time of winding up the business, Ferrier Hodgson reported that there were 190 direct employees, including 130 in South Australia.

== Awards ==
York Civil won an Engineering Excellence award in 2000 for the 407m Blanchetown Bridge, the first incrementally-launched bridge in South Australia.

York Civil was the local partner in the joint venture which constructed the Northern Expressway north of Adelaide, for which it won an award in 2011 for projects over A$75 million from the Civil Contractors Federation of South Australia.
