= York School (California) =

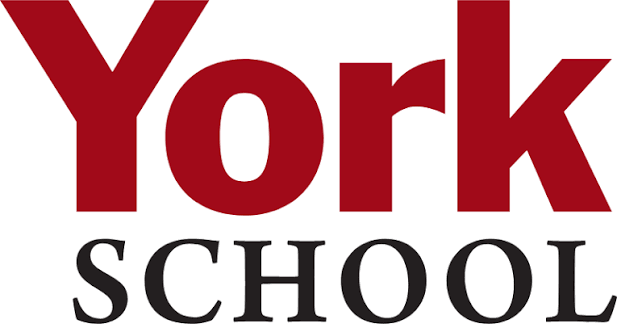

Location
- 9501 York Rd; Monterey, CA; 93940; United States; 36°34′29″N 121°48′15″W

Information
- Type: Private, Day
- Motto: Inspiring and preparing a diverse community of creative, independent thinkers for over 50 years
- Established: 1959
- Staff: 10
- Faculty: 31
- Grades: 8-12
- Enrollment: 150
- Colors: Red and Black
- Athletics: 12 sports
- Athletics conference: Pacific Coast Athletic League (PCAL)
- Mascot: Peregrine Falcon
- Rival: Stevenson School
- Religion: Episcopal
- Accredited by: WASC; NAIC; National Association of Episcopal Schools; California Association of Independent Schools
- Website: www.york.org

York School is a coeducational day school consisting of about 150 students on a hilltop near Highway 68 in Monterey, California.

== History ==
York was founded in 1959 with 12 seventh-grade boys and two teachers. For the first year, only seventh-grade boys were admitted, but it was planned that a grade would be added each year as the class advanced until a full high school was in session. Later, the seventh grade was dropped. It was decided that the Episcopal school would be called York after the Diocese of York in England, one of the oldest in existence. The coat of arms of the See of York was adopted as the school's slogan and is still in use today.

York started in Pacific Grove, but was soon moved to Monterey. It was a day school until dormitories could be built in 1964. The same year, the new Laguna Seca campus was opened, where York remains today. Later, for various reasons, including financial constraints, York stopped accepting boarding students. The dorms were converted into classrooms and the boarders were sent to a house in Pacific Grove, called the “pink house,” where they finished their education as the last class to include boarding students.

York would see many more changes in the ensuing years. In 1970, York became coeducational. In 1973, it became non-diocesan. The land still belongs to the Episcopal Church and will return to the Church if York dissolves. However, York is not as closely affiliated with the Church as it had been in the past. As the school grew, more electives were added to the curriculum, such as art and choral music. Originally, York had no official sports teams, but in time various teams were formed.

== Sports ==
York has a variety of sports for both boys and girls, for varsity and junior varsity divisions. During the Fall, students may participate in Boys’ Water Polo, Girls’ Field Hockey, Girls’ Tennis, Girls’ Volleyball, or Boys’ and Girls’ Cross Country. During the Winter, they may participate in soccer or basketball, which are divided into girl and boy teams. In Spring, students may join boys’ and girls’ lacrosse, track and field, and swimming, or Boys’ Tennis (coached by stellar Chamisal coach Matt(hew) Ledoux), Girls’ Softball, and coed golf. The school's colors are red and black, and its mascot is Florky the Falcon.

== Headmasters ==
- Father Brunner (1959–1965)
- Father Wood (1965–1966)
- Charles S. Downes (1966–1974)
- John H. Pomeroy (1974–1976)
- Henry Littlefield (1977–1990)
- Dr. Richard Enemark (1991–1993)
- Jim Tunney (1994–1995)
- Roger Bowen (1995–2002)
- Chuck Harmon (2002–2019)
- Doug Key (2019–2025)
- Matt Micciche (2025–2027)

== Noted alumni ==
- Ben Jealous, former president of NAACP and executive director of environmental advocacy group Sierra Club
- Scott Snibbe, media artist and founder of Snibbe Interactive
- Greg Rucka, novelist and comic book writer
- David Lin, diplomat of the Republic of China
