= D type Adelaide tram =

Class of 20th-century tram in Adelaide

D type
- Manufacturer: A Pengelly & Co; Duncan & Fraser
- Assembly: Adelaide
- Constructed: 1910-12
- Number built: 54
- Fleet numbers: 121-170, 191-194
- Capacity: 54 seats (as built); 49 or 50 (as modified); 100 standees

Specifications
- Car length: 13.11 metres / 43' 0⅜" (over bumpers)
- Width: 2.36 metres / 8' 10" (over footboards)
- Height: 3.53 metres
- Wheel diameter: 838 mm / 33" (driving); 508 mm / 20" (pony)
- Weight: 15.8 tons (126-170); 16.3 tons (others)
- Traction motors: 2 x 50hp GE 202 (121-125, 191-194); 2 x 50hp DK 11B (126-150); 2 x 65hp GE 201G (151-170)
- Power supply: 600 Volts DC
- Current collector(s): Trolley pole with trolley wheel
- Bogies: Brill 22E (121-125); Brush 22E (126-170, 191-194)
- Track gauge: 1,435 mm (4 ft 8 1/2 in)

The Adelaide D type tram was a class of trams operated by the Municipal Tramways Trust on the Adelaide tram network from 1910 until 1958.

== History ==
Between 1910 and 1912, A Pengelly & Co of Adelaide assembled 50 bogie closed combination trams for the Municipal Tramways Trust (MTT) from knock-down kits manufactured by the JG Brill Company of Philadelphia.

Numbered 121-170, they were built to provide increased passenger carrying capacity for the planned expansion of Adelaide's electric tramway network into the outer suburbs. When the MTT introduced an alphabetic classification system in 1923, they were classified as the D type. A further 20 were built as open combination trams numbered 101-120 that later became the E type. All were delivered with 22E bogies, the sets under 121-125 being manufactured by JG Brill Company, the remainder by Brush Electrical Machines.

Meanwhile, in 1912 Duncan & Fraser (Adelaide) had built four almost identical trams (there were only slight differences in detail between the trams of the two manufacturers, such as the Duncan & Fraser cars having concave rocker panels rather than convex); for the Prahran & Malvern Tramways Trust in Melbourne, and were allocated numbers 21 to 24. In 1916 they were sold to the Hawthorn Tramways Trust (HTT), where they retained fleet numbers 21 to 24.

All passed to the Melbourne & Metropolitan Tramways Board (MMTB) on 2 February 1920 when it took over the HTT, being renumbered 127 to 130 and designated the O-class. Due to their unpopularity in Melbourne, and having built sufficient standard W-class trams to render smaller groups of older non-standard cars surplus, the O-class were amongst the first electric trams to be disposed of by the MMTB. All four were sold to the MTT and returned to Adelaide in January 1927 entering service as D type trams 191 to 194 (renumbered from 128, 130, 127, and 129 respectively).

During the 1920s all the Metropolitan cars had their track brakes removed when pneumatic brake equipment was fitted, although unlike the Adelaide trams, the former O-class trams had their brake notches disabled when air brakes were fitted in Melbourne. Due to the dangers faced by conductors collecting fares while balancing on footboards, an aisle was cut through four of the six cross-bench seats in 1935 - except for numbers 191 to 194 which had already had five seats so treated prior to leaving Melbourne. The last D types remained in service until the closure of the street-based tramway network in 1958.

== Preservation ==
One has been preserved:

- 192 by the Tramway Museum, St Kilda
