= C-class tram =

C-class tram may refer to:

- C-class Melbourne tram, built 2001–2002
- C-class Melbourne tram (1913)
- C2-class Melbourne tram, originally leased in 2008
- C-class Sydney tram, built 1896–1900

== See also ==
- C type Adelaide tram
