= O-class tram =

O-class tram may refer to:

- O-class Melbourne tram, built 1912
- O-class Sydney tram, built 1907-1914
