= B class Melbourne tram (1917) =

B-class
- Manufacturers: James Moore & Sons
- Assembly: South Melbourne
- Constructed: 1917/18
- Number built: 12
- Fleet numbers: 21-24, 84-91
- Capacity: 36

Specifications
- Car length: 9.43 m (30 ft 11 in)
- Height: 3.25 m (10 ft 8 in)
- Wheel diameter: 838 mm (33.0 in)
- Wheelbase: 1.98 m (6 ft 6 in)
- Current collection: Trolley pole
- Bogies: JG Brill Company 21E
- Track gauge: 1,435 mm (4 ft 8 1/2 in)

The B-class was a class of twelve trams built by James & Moore & Sons for the Prahran & Malvern Tramways Trust (PMTT). Numbered 21-24 and 84–91, the former four taking numbers vacated when O class trams were sold to the Hawthorn Tramways Trust in 1916.

All passed to the Melbourne & Metropolitan Tramways Board on 2 February 1920 when it took over the PMTT, becoming the B-class and retaining their running numbers. Four were sold for further use in 1931 on the Bendigo network.
