= Type H =

Type H or H-type may refer to:

- Citroën H-Type vans
- Type H plugs and sockets
- a type of Bronze Age sword
- the FBA Type H, a flying boat
- the Caudron Type H, any of a number of related airplane designs
- the Mann Egerton Type H, an aircraft
- Type H Tightlock couplers, in rail transport
- a Type H flash memory card
- the Jensen H-type, a car
- H type Adelaide tram
- H1 type Adelaide tram
- V/Line H type carriage
