= B type Adelaide tram =

Class of 20th-century tram in Adelaide

B type
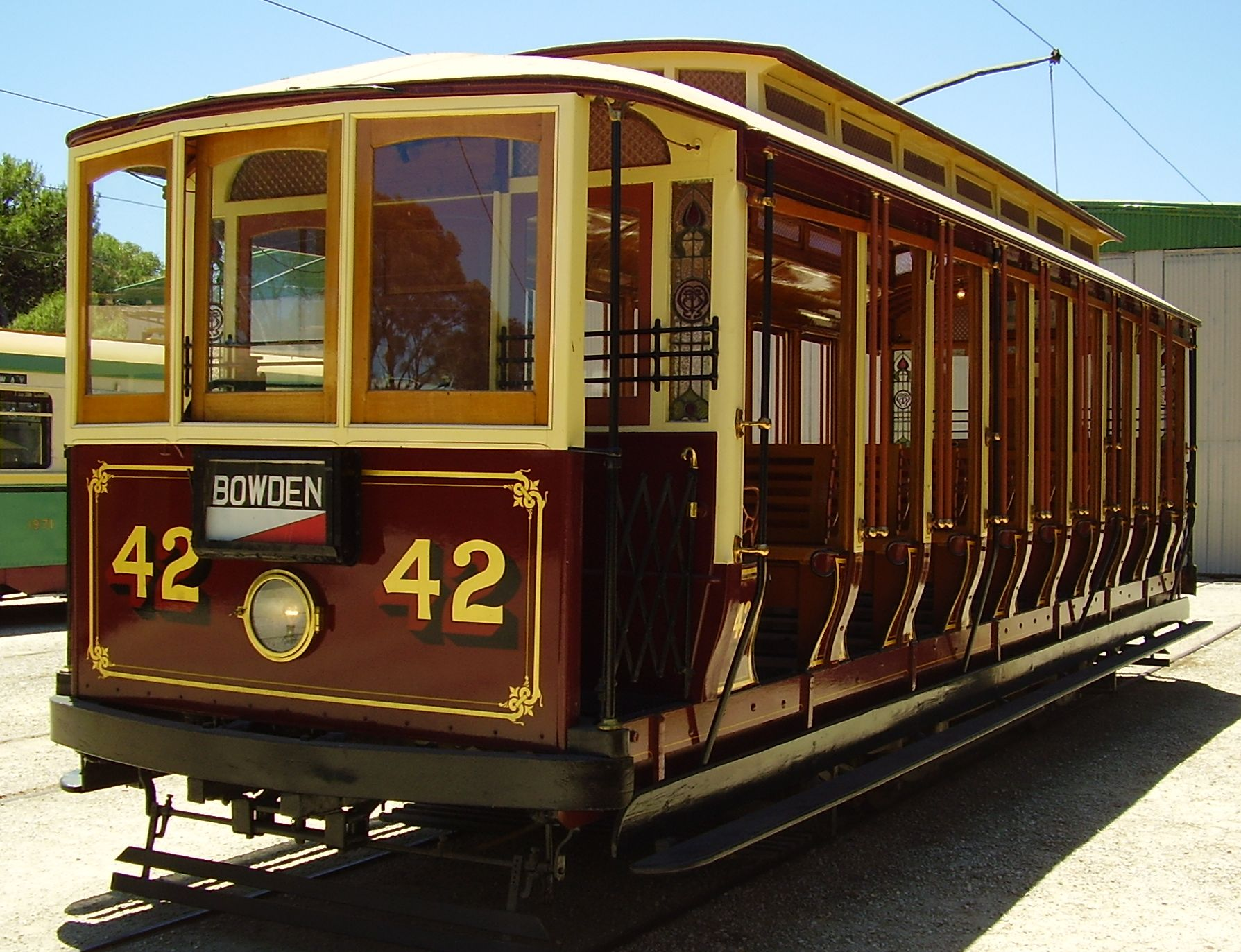
- B42 at the Tramway Museum, St Kilda in January 2007
- Manufacturer: Duncan & Fraser
- Assembly: Adelaide
- Constructed: 1909
- Number built: 30
- Fleet numbers: 31-60
- Capacity: 50

Specifications
- Car length: 9.91 metres
- Width: 2.57 metres
- Height: 3.30 metres
- Weight: 10.6 tonnes
- Traction motors: 2 x 33hp Westinghouse
- Current collector(s): Trolley pole
- Bogies: JG Brill Company 21E
- Track gauge: 1,435 mm (4 ft 8 1/2 in)

The B type Adelaide tram was a class of 30 straight sill, open cross-bench trams built by Duncan & Fraser, Adelaide in 1909 for the Municipal Tramways Trust (MTT). Although popular in summer, they were less so in winter when exposed to inclement weather. Thus in 1917 with the MTT requiring more trams, 41-60 were converted to Californian combination trams, closely resembling the A type trams. When the MTT introduced an alpha classification system in 1923, they were designated the B type. Numbers 41-43 became the A2 type and 44-60 the A1 type. The A2s were used exclusively on the isolated Port Adelaide network.

== Preservation ==
One has been preserved:

- 42 by the Tramway Museum, St Kilda
