= E type Adelaide tram =

Class of 20th-century tram in Adelaide

E type
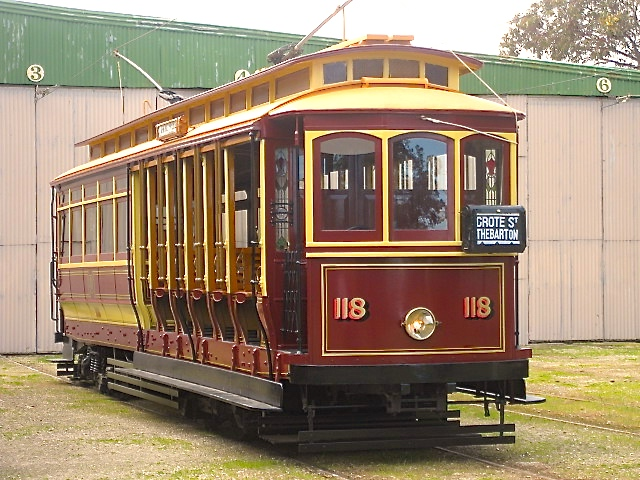
- E118 at the Tramway Museum, St Kilda in September 2010
- Manufacturer: A Pengelly & Co
- Assembly: Adelaide
- Constructed: 1910
- Number built: 20
- Fleet numbers: 101-120
- Capacity: 54

Specifications
- Traction motors: 2 x 50hp General Electric 202s (as built); 2 x 65hp General Electric 201s (after rebuild)
- Current collector(s): Trolley pole
- Bogies: JG Brill Company 22E
- Track gauge: 1,435 mm (4 ft 8 1/2 in)

The E type Adelaide tram was a class of 20 bogie, half open, half closed combination trams with one drop and one straight sill end built by A Pengelly & Co, Adelaide in 1910 for the Municipal Tramways Trust (MTT). In 1918/19, all were remotored with 65 hp General Electric 201s with the original 50 hp General Electric 202s reused in the C type trams. When the MTT introduced an alpha classification system in 1923, they were designated the E type. In 1936, all were converted to E1s with crossbenches removed and the saloon extended along the full length.

== Preservation ==
Two have been preserved:

- 111 & 118 by the Tramway Museum, St Kilda
