= A type Adelaide tram =

Class of 20th-century tram in Adelaide

A type
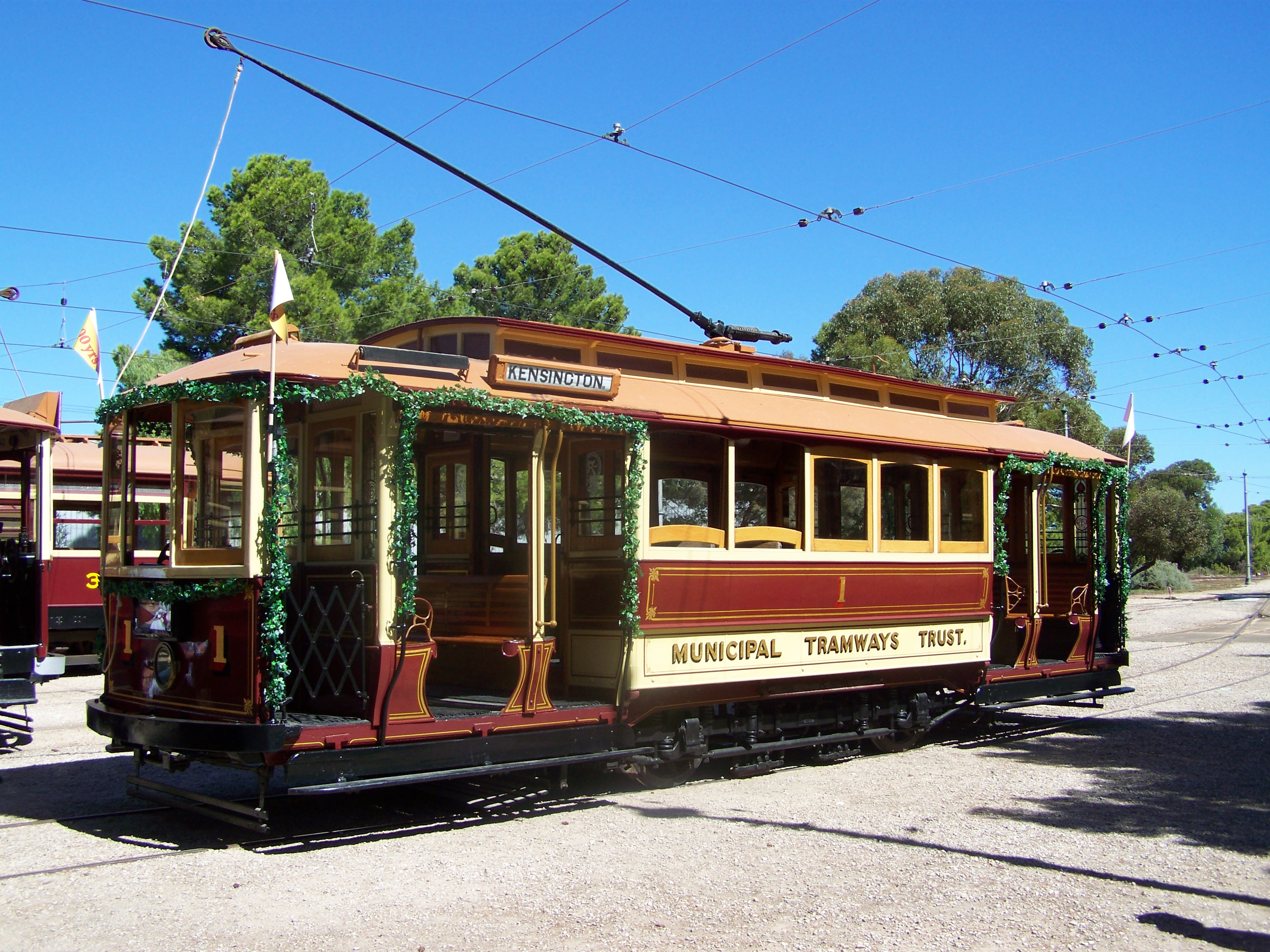
- A1 at the Tramway Museum, St Kilda in 2009
- Manufacturer: Duncan & Fraser
- Assembly: Adelaide
- Constructed: 1908/09
- Number built: 70
- Fleet numbers: 1-30, 61-100
- Capacity: 40

Specifications
- Car length: 10.19 metres
- Width: 2.69 metres
- Height: 3.35 metres
- Weight: 10.9 tonnes
- Traction motors: 2 x 33hp Westinghouse
- Current collection: Trolley pole
- Bogies: JG Brill Company 21E
- Track gauge: 1,435 mm (4 ft 8 1/2 in)

The A type Adelaide tram is a class of 70 drop-end combination trams built to a "Californian" design by Duncan & Fraser, Adelaide in 1908/09 for the Municipal Tramways Trust (MTT). They were used on tram lines to Kensington, Marryatville, Maylands, Payneham, Wakerville, North Adelaide, Parkside, Unley and Hyde Park. In later years they were cascaded to quieter services to Croydon and the isolated Port Adelaide network.

Their California combination description encompassed their combination of a central saloon compartment and open cross-bench seating at each end; a design that had proved popular in California, with its climate similar to Adelaide's.

When the MTT introduced an alphabetical classification system in 1923, they were designated A type. Many were retired in the 1930s, but most returned to service during World War II operating in coupled pairs to conserve manpower. These were nicknamed Bib & Bubs after comic characters created by children's author May Gibbs. The remaining examples were withdrawn in 1952.

They were never fitted with air brakes, instead using handbrakes for normal stops and magnetic track brakes for emergencies. All 70 were originally fitted with Brill Winner style (tip-over) seats in the saloon section; in 1937 20 cars swapped their seats with Hale & Kilburn fixed rattan seats from 20 C type trams.

Numbers 10, 69 and 92 were sold to the State Electricity Commission of Victoria and placed in service in Ballarat as numbers 21, 23, and 22. The former remained in service until the system closed in 1971.

== Preservation ==
Four have been preserved:

- 1 and 10 by the Tramway Museum, St Kilda
- 14 and 15 by the Tramway Museum, St Kilda as a "Bib and Bub" coupled pair.
