= H1 type Adelaide tram =

Class of 20th-century tram in Adelaide

H1 type
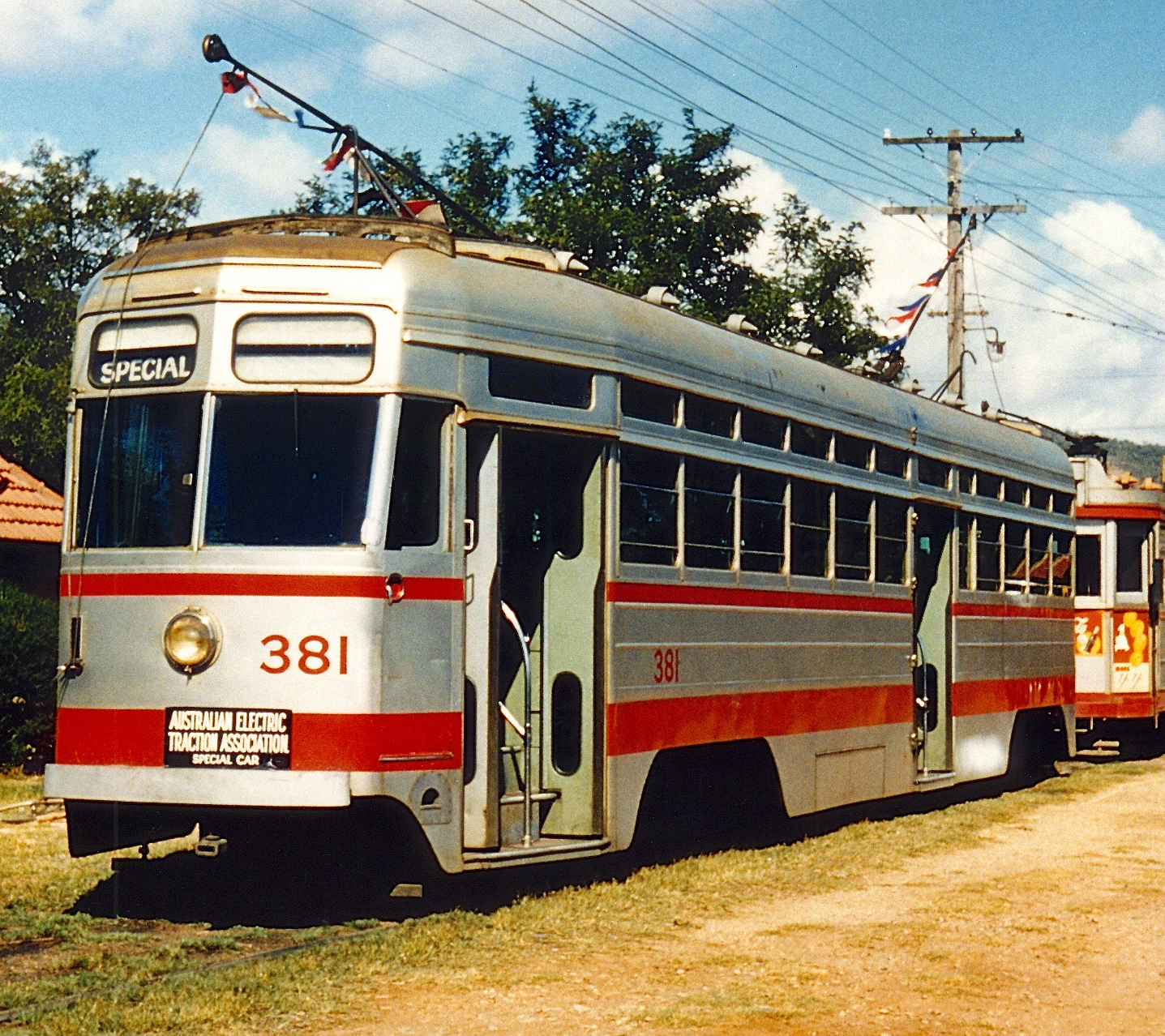
- 381 in April 1956
- Manufacturer: JA Lawton & Sons
- Assembly: Adelaide
- Constructed: 1953
- Number built: 1
- Fleet numbers: 381

Specifications
- Traction motors: 4 x English Electric
- Current collector(s): Trolley pole
- Track gauge: 1,435 mm (4 ft 8 1/2 in)

The H1 type Adelaide tram was a one-off tram built by JA Lawton & Sons in 1952 for the Municipal Tramways Trust (MTT), Adelaide.

== History ==
The MTT proposed to build 40 new trams in 1939 as an evolution of the H type. However it was not until 1952 that the prototype numbered 381 was built. With the Adelaide tramway network slated for closure, no more were built with a second that was under construction scrapped. It entered service in February 1953 operating between Kensington Gardens and Henley Beach. It was withdrawn in 1957 with the closure of the network.

In August 1965, it was donated to the Tramway Museum, St Kilda and restored to operational condition in July 1974. It operated on the Glenelg line in June 1978 in conjunction with Centenary of Street Transport celebrations.
