= Tramway Museum, St Kilda =

Tramway museum in Adelaide, South Australia

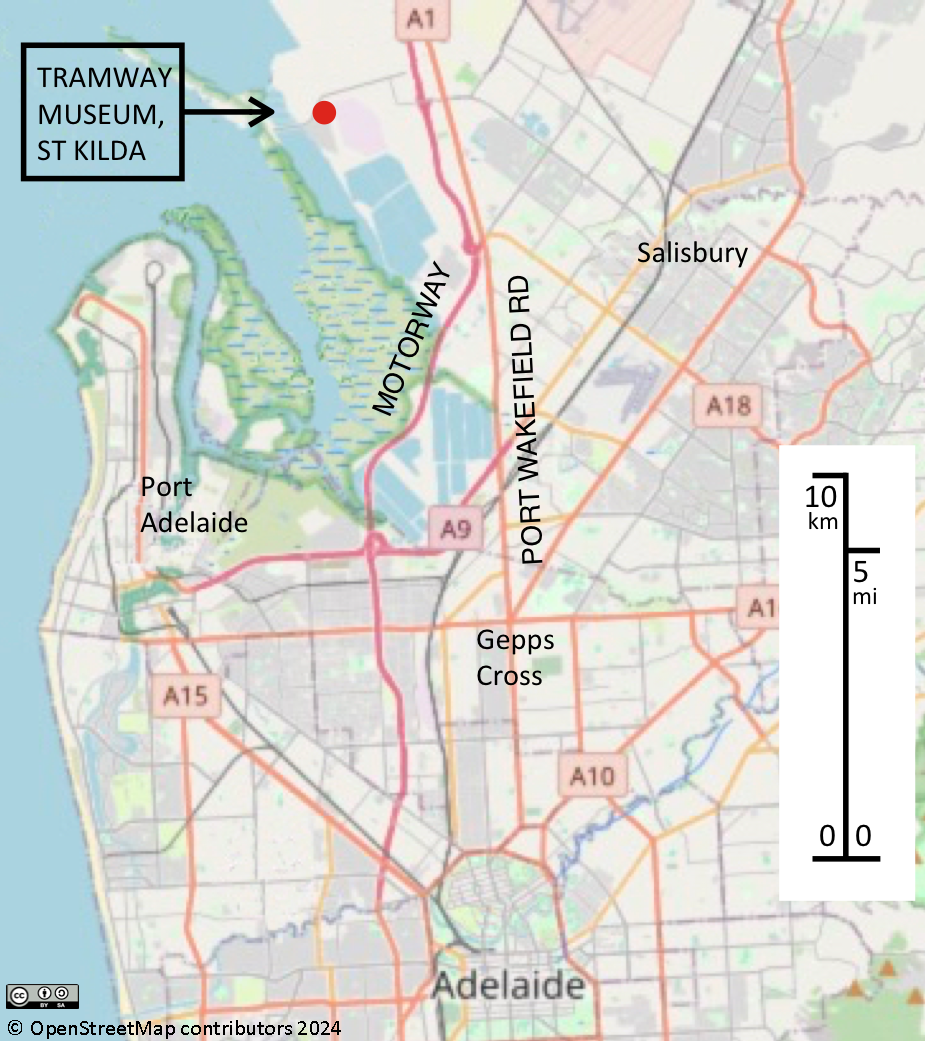
- Established: 1958
- Location: 300–360 St Kilda Road, St Kilda, South Australia
- Coordinates: 34.736°S 138.548°E
- Type: Tramway museum
- Collections: Trams and trolleybuses made or used in South Australia
- Collection size: As of 2024: 24 trams, 1 tram-hauled horsebox, 5 trolleybuses, 2 horse trams, 1 diesel bus
- Visitors: Open noon–5 pm on Sundays and most public holidays.
- Owner: Australian Electric Transport Museum (SA) Inc.
- Public transit access: No public transport
- Parking: Ample on site; free
- Website: www.trammuseumadelaide.com

The Tramway Museum, St Kilda is Australia's principal museum of the 19th and 20th century trams of Adelaide, South Australia. It is situated at St Kilda, 24 kilometres (15 miles) north of the centre of Adelaide. It is operated by the Australian Electric Transport Museum (SA) Inc., a not-for-profit volunteer organisation affiliated with the Council of Tramway Museums of Australasia. It is dedicated to the study, conservation and restoration of trams that were used in Adelaide or built there, and likewise with a small bus and trolleybus collection.Trams provide unlimited free rides for visitors on payment of the entrance fee. They operate along a 1.6 kilometres (1.0 mile) purpose-built track between the museum and a large adventure playground.

== Scope ==
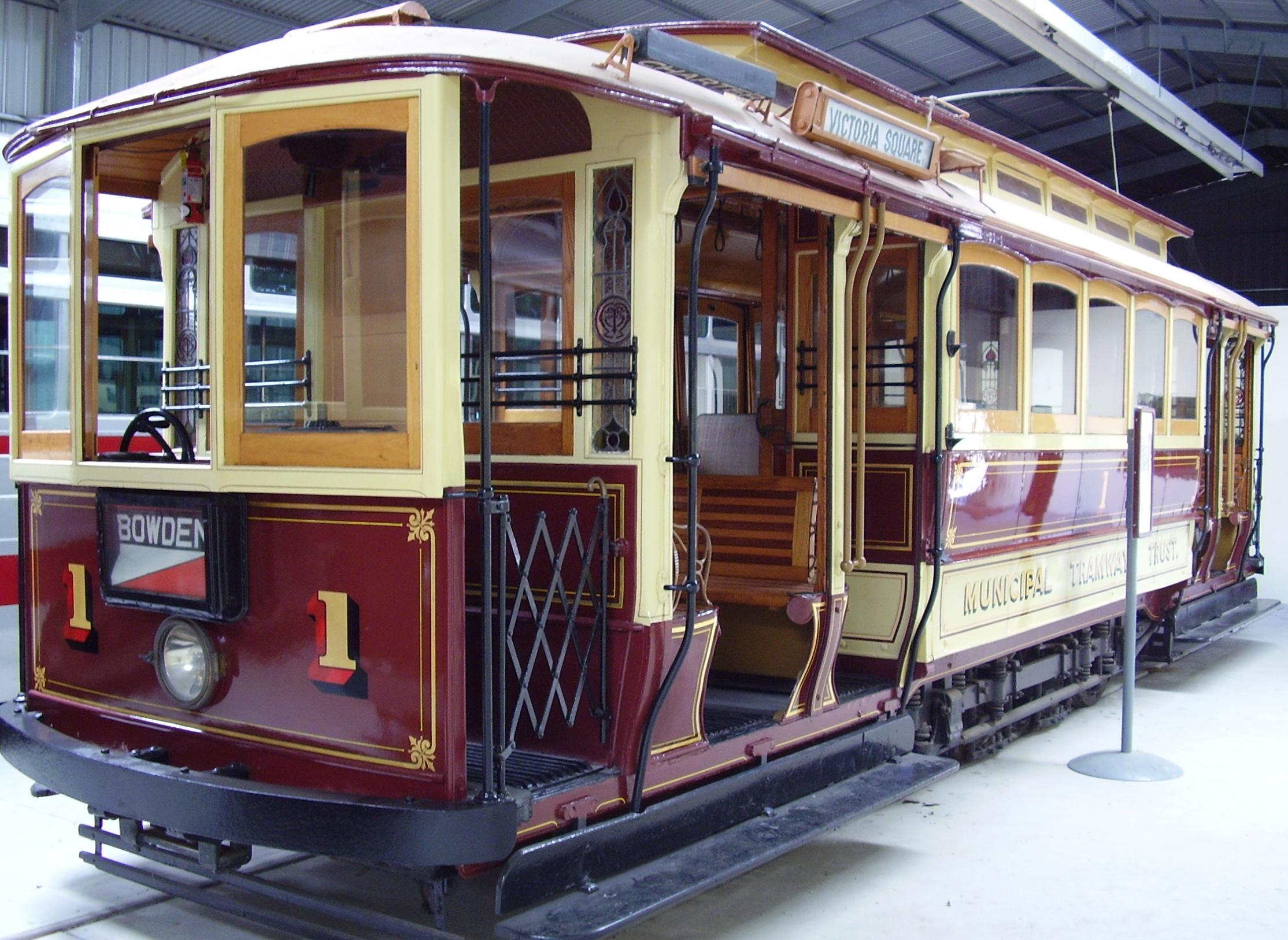
Adelaide's first electric tram, Tram no. 1, is one of 27 electric trams at the museum

The museum is one of very few transport museums in the world holding at least one example of every principal tram type to have been in service on a city street system. (Note: Technically, two tram types are unrepresented, but their omission is trivial since both were rebuilds of Type B trams, namely Type A1, of which 17 were built, and Type A2, of which 3 were built.)

From a vacant site in 1958, the museum as of 2024 housed 24 electric trams, 2 horse trams, a tram-hauled horsebox, 5 trolleybuses, and a diesel bus of the type that operated when the street tram network was closed in 1958. Museum features include an entrance gallery, bookshop, interpretative displays and archive. Maintenance and construction facilities include two workshops, a wheel lathe building, ancillary storage sheds and a "travelling workshop", a former Melbourne W2 class tram.

Staffed by volunteers, the museum relies mainly on visitor admissions to fund its work. Major projects are supported by donations from museum members and occasional grants from South Australian Government museum assistance programs and the Salisbury Council. The council crucially secured funding from a 1972 state government unemployment relief scheme to lay the all-important tramway from the museum site alongside St Kilda Road towards the sea, and to erect poles for overhead wiring.

== Development ==
In 1958, work started at the 5.3 hectares (13 acres) museum site with the arrival of donated vehicles: the first were four trams from Adelaide's Municipal Tramways Trust (MTT), which that year had closed its street tram network, leaving intact only the mainly enclosed Glenelg tram line. The museum opened as a static display in 1967. The tramway commenced trials in 1973 and was officially opened in 1974, coinciding with St Kilda's centenary. Subsequently, workshops were built to restore trams to operating condition; additional depots between 1980 and in 2001 to house the increasing number of trams in the collection; and in 2017 the original depot and workshop was replaced by a new facility.

== Fleet ==
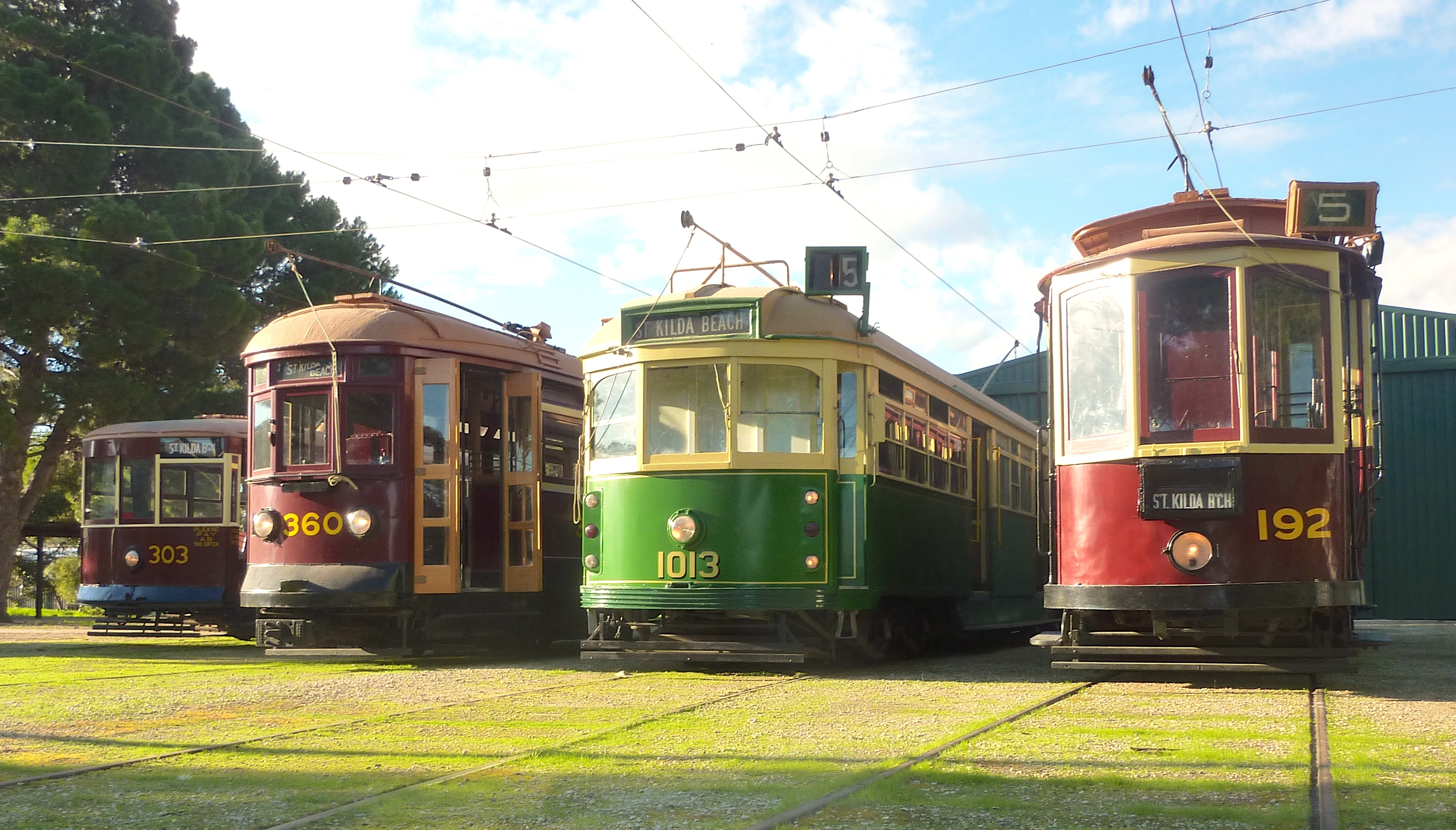
The museum's entrance fee entitles visitors to free afternoon tram rides to and from St Kilda's large adventure playground. From a fleet of more than a dozen operational trams, Type G "Birney" no. 303, Type H ("Glenelg" or "Bay") tram no. 360, Melbourne W7 Class no. 1013 and Type D no. 192 are a typical selection of trams operating on open days.

The pre-electric era, from 1878 to 1917, is represented by horse tram no. 18 of the Adelaide and Suburban Tramway Company, the largest of 11 companies that together operated more than 150 vehicles on a network of about 120 km (75 mi), mostly of standard gauge. (Note: The Port Adelaide horse tram network was of 1600 millimetres (5 feet 3 inches) broad gauge, the same as Adelaide’s suburban railway network. With electrification it was converted to standard gauge, matching Adelaide's tram network.) Displayed next to it is tram no. 15 of the Adelaide, Unley and Mitcham Tramway Company, in the deteriorated condition that is a common starting point for many restoration tasks of tramway museums.

The electric era, which started in 1909, was under the management of the MTT, a body established in late 1907 and governed mainly by councillors nominated by local governments. From then until 1958, when the street tram system was closed down, the trust had owned more than 300 trams and operated over a network of about 100 km (62 mi). After 1958, there remained only the 10.8 km (6.7 mi) line from Glenelg to the geographic centre of Adelaide. About 85% of the line was in its own reserved corridor, and a 1957 study of the economic and physical features of the line had concluded that the good state of the track and rolling stock would allow the tramway to continue for about ten years, when its future would be reviewed. Another report recommended that the right of way be converted to a "sturdy" pavement solely for a bus service; but funding never eventuated. It was to be another 47 years before a tramways renaissance began. (Note: Following an upgrade of the Glenelg tram line in 2005 and the acquisition of Bombardier Flexity Classic trams in 2006, the line was extended by another 4.2 km (2.6 mi) between 2007 and 2018.)

The museum holds at least one tram of each main type from the MTT era. Its collection also includes two Melbourne trams. One, W-class Melbourne tram no. 294, was built in Adelaide by Holden's Body Builders, the predecessor of General Motors-Holden; the other (W7 class 1013), which offers a comparison with the MTT's fast-loading Type F cars, has been modified for easy wheelchair access. A third fast-loader is a Sydney R1 Class tram, lent by the Sydney Tramway Museum.

Trolleybuses preserved are a 1925-built Garford, a 1937 AEC 661T, a 1942 double-deck Leyland, a 1945 single-deck Leyland whose chassis was originally destined for Canton, China (now Guangzhou), and a 1952 Sunbeam MF2B. A 1954 AEC Regal IV motor bus is also preserved.

Preserved Adelaide trams at the Tramway Museum, St Kilda, 2023
Type	Number	Notes
Horse	15, 18	Car 18 (of the Adelaide and Suburban Tramway Company) is in fully restored running condition but is not operated. Next to it, the body of car 15 (Adelaide, Unley and Mitcham Tramway Company) is displayed in the deteriorated condition in which it was recovered to provide a contrasting example of a tram before restoration.
A	1 14, 15 (coupled)	Operational, used on special occasions. See also: Ballarat Tramways car 21 in the following table. Operable (as a coupled "Bib and Bub" pair) following a 15-year deep restoration completed in 2022.
B	42	Operational.
C	186	Operational.
D	192	Formerly Prahran & Malvern Tramways Trust 24, then Hawthorn Tramways Trust 24, then Melbourne & Metropolitan Tramways Board O-class tram 130. Operational.
E	118	Converted back from a Type E1. Operational.
E1	111	Operational.
F, F1	244, 264, 282	Type F1 numbers 264 and 282 are operational.
G	303	Operational.
H	351, 352, 360, 362, 364, 365, 378	As of April 2024, 351 was on static display pending conversion from pantograph power collection to the earlier configuration of trolley-pole collection; 352 had been converted and was in operation. (Note: Class-leader 351 and tram 352 (formerly 367) are the museum's latest acquisitions: the Department for Infrastructure and Transport donated them to the museum and delivered them in October 2021. A significant donation, they were the last two H trams used in Adelaide and were restored by the department in 2012–13 to a very high standard. After having been used only occasionally since 2015 they were placed in departmental storage in 2017 before being donated.) 360 and privately owned 365 are normally operational. 362, 364 and 378 (former restaurant tram) are operational but are normally on static display indoors.
H1	381	Operational.

Preserved trams from other states at the Tramway Museum, St Kilda, 2023
Ran in city of	Class	Number	Notes
Ballarat	–	21	On display. Was MTT Type A car number 10 before it was sold to the State Electricity Commission of Victoria for service in Ballarat, in whose livery it has been conserved.
Melbourne	W2	294	Operational. Built in Adelaide by Holden's Body Builders for the Melbourne & Metropolitan Tramways Board.
Melbourne	W2	354	Not for conservation: used as a works tram for maintaining track and overhead wires.
Melbourne	W7	1013	Operational.
Sydney	R1	1971	Operational. On loan from the Sydney Tramway Museum.

== Operations ==
The museum is classified as a rail transport operator under the provisions of the Rail Safety National Law Act 2012 (SA) and must now employ the stringent operational documentation and procedures that apply to all contemporary Australian railways. During the severe COVID-19 pandemic restrictions of 2019 and 2020, the museum ceased running trams while it undertook the major task of upgrading its operational documentation and procedures to meet the requirements of the Office of the National Rail Safety Regulator. During that period, the Salisbury Council was able to undertake some major improvements on the line: easing and re-laying the curve at a level crossing in new grooved rail, and re-laying a second level crossing; replacing some overhead poles; and re-hanging overhead wires to match the new track alignment. The public tram service resumed in May 2021.

== Access ==
The museum is open every Sunday and most public holidays from 12 pm to 5 pm – excluding Christmas, Boxing Day and Good Friday. A Salisbury Council community bus, which makes three return trips on Sundays, departs from the Parabanks Shopping Centre near the Salisbury railway station and bus interchange.

== Gallery ==
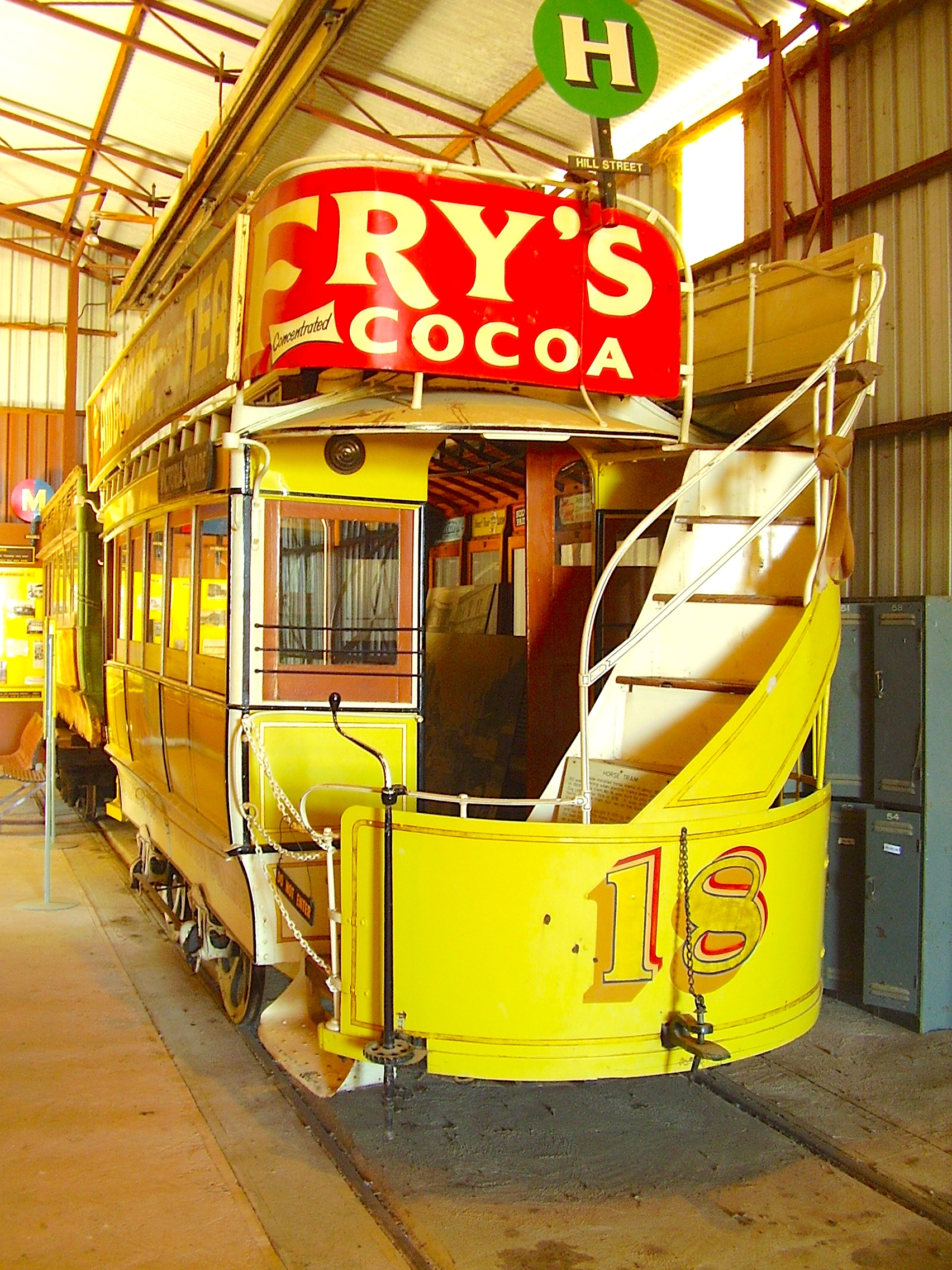
Horse tram no. 18, one of about 160 vehicles that served Adelaide from 1878 to 1917

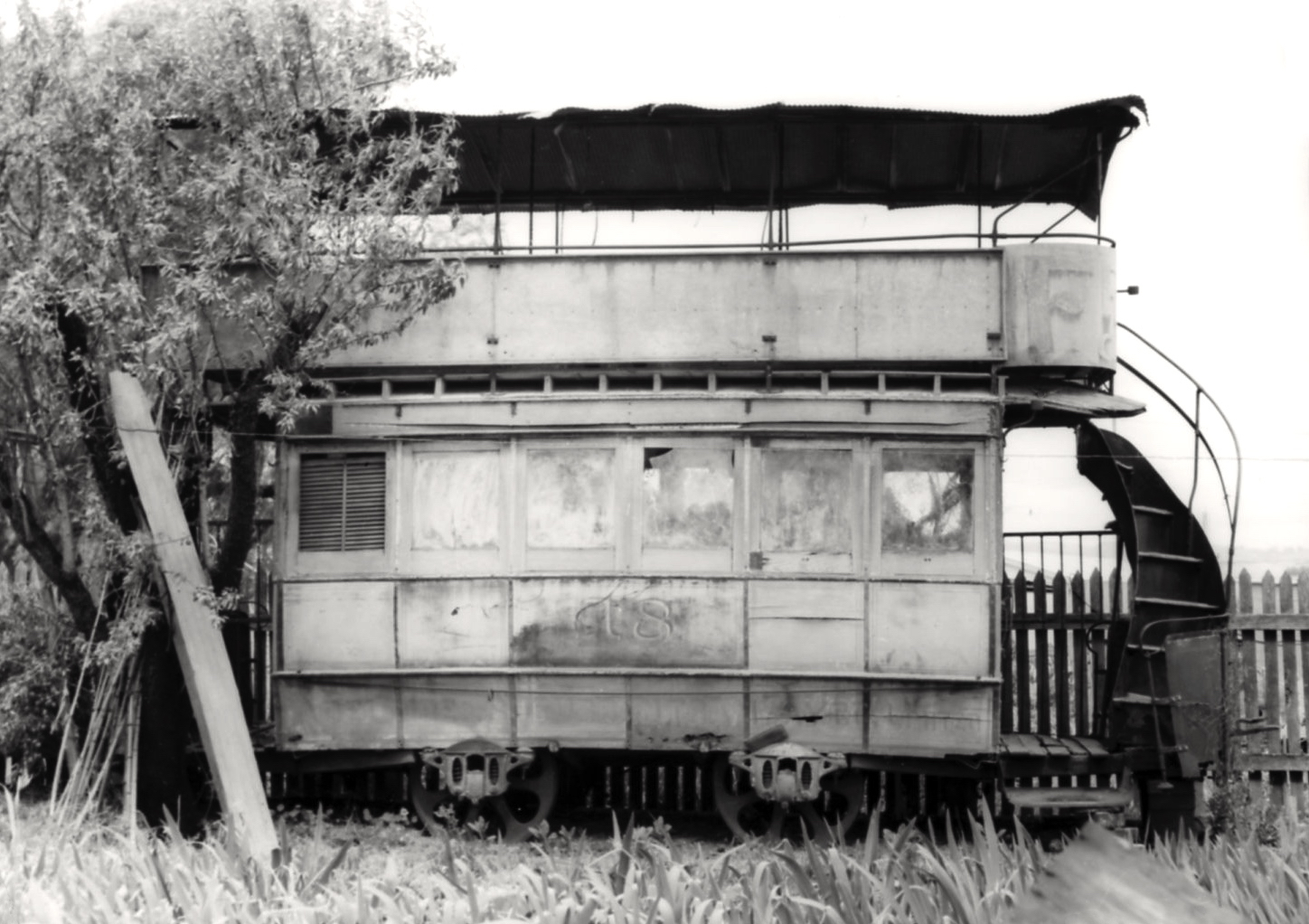
Horse tram no. 18 in 1963, as it was before being retrieved from a suburban back yard and restored

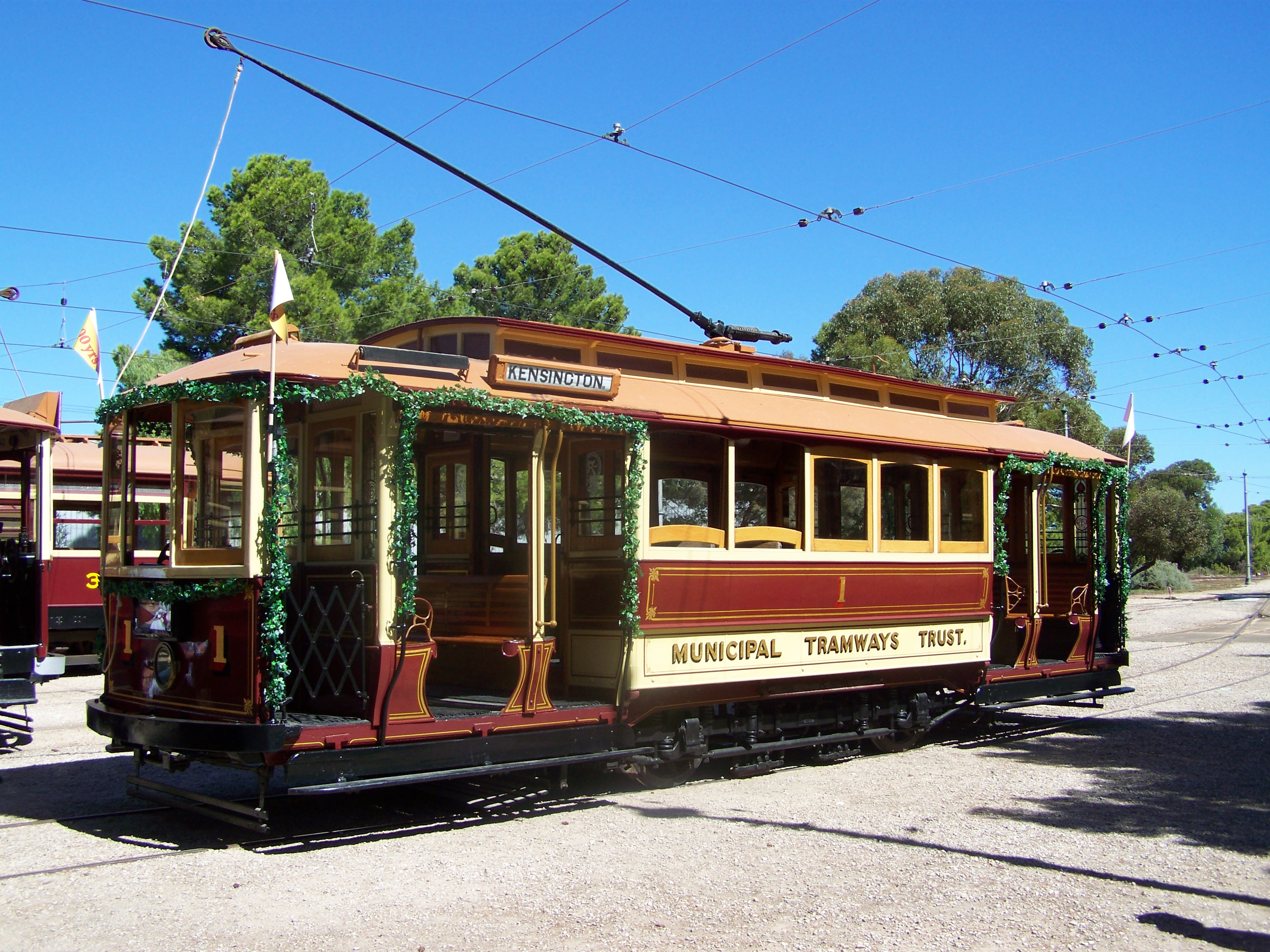
Tram no. 1 (termed "Type A" in the post-1923 classification scheme), configured as it was in the inaugural electric fleet of 1909

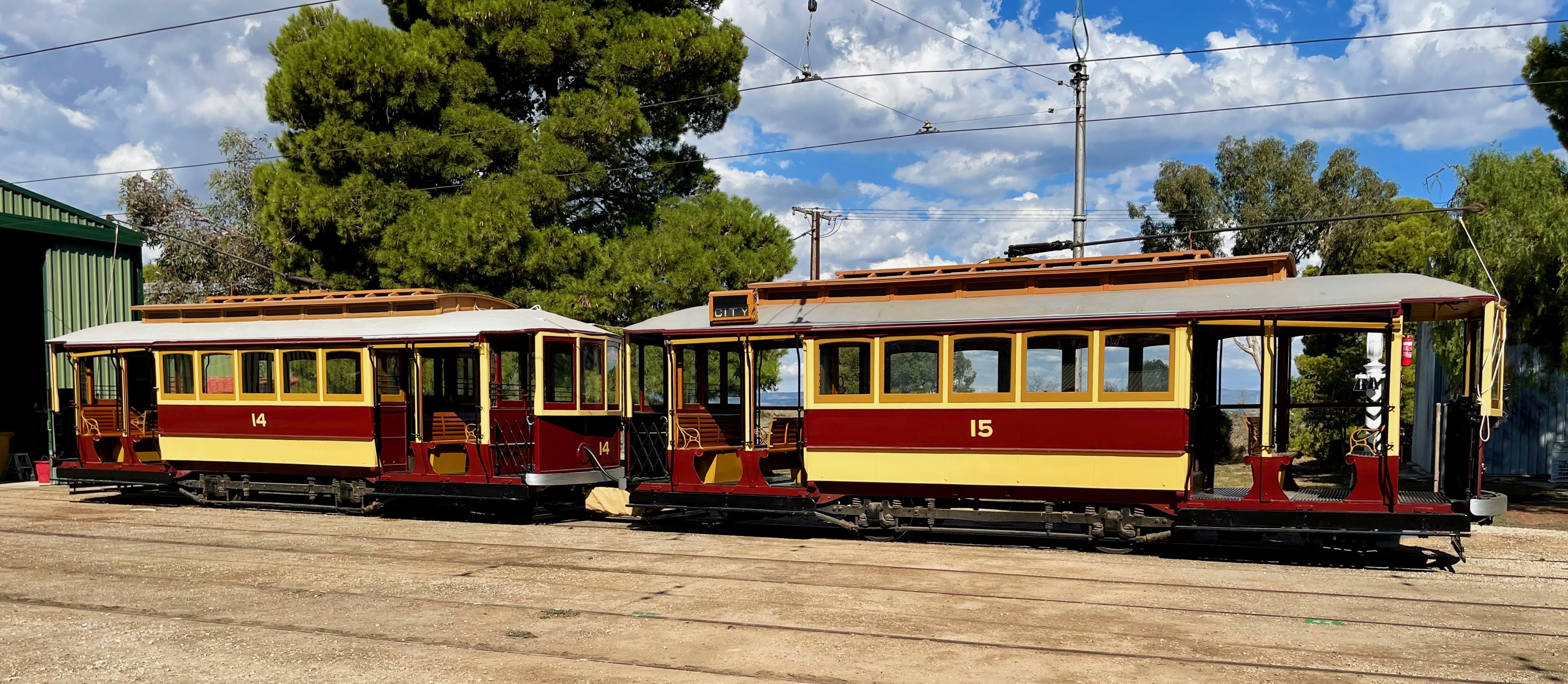
Type A cars, including nos 14 and 15, came out of retirement during World War II, most in coupled pairs nicknamed "Bib and Bub"

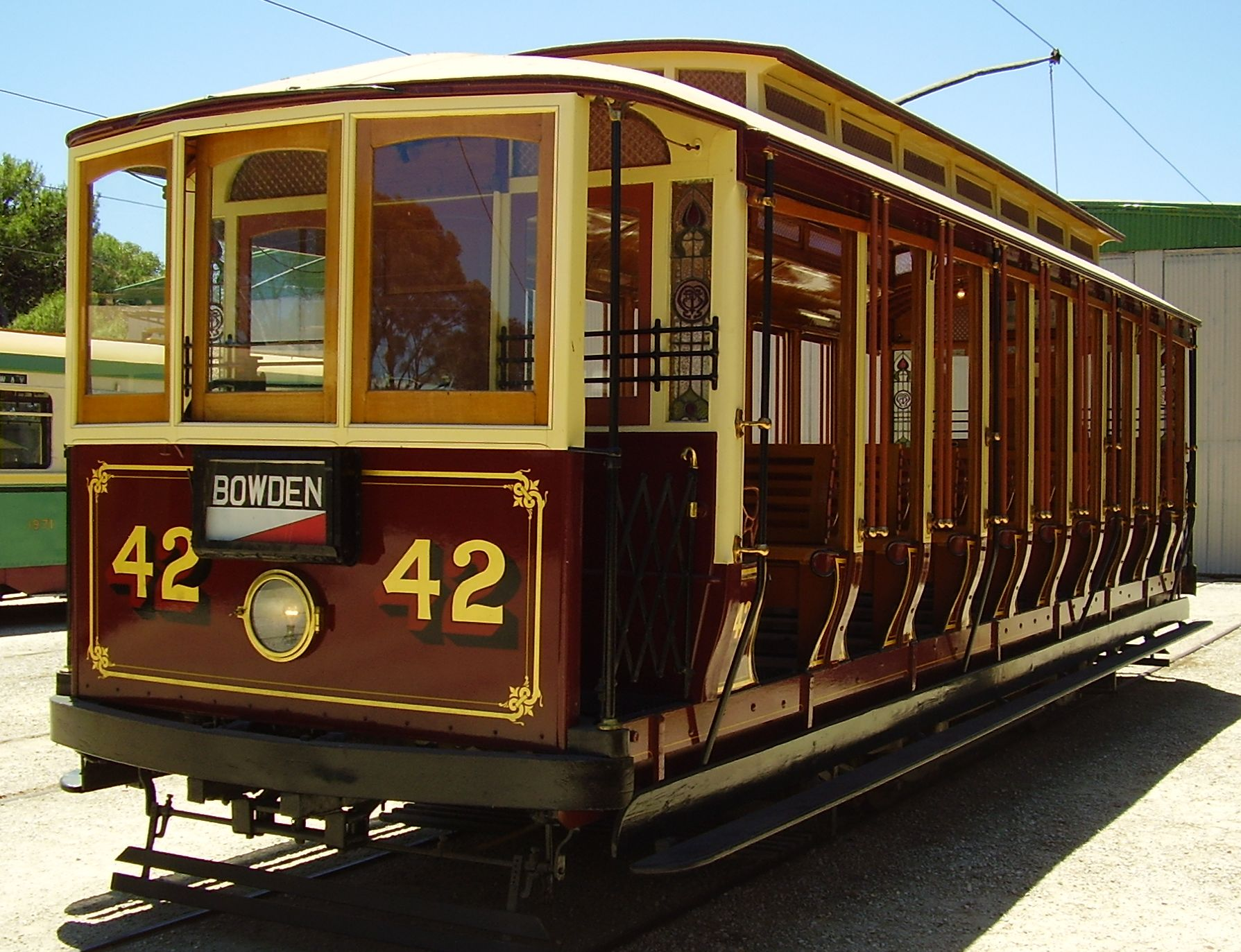
Type B ("toastrack") tram no. 42, configured as it was in the inaugural electric fleet of 1909

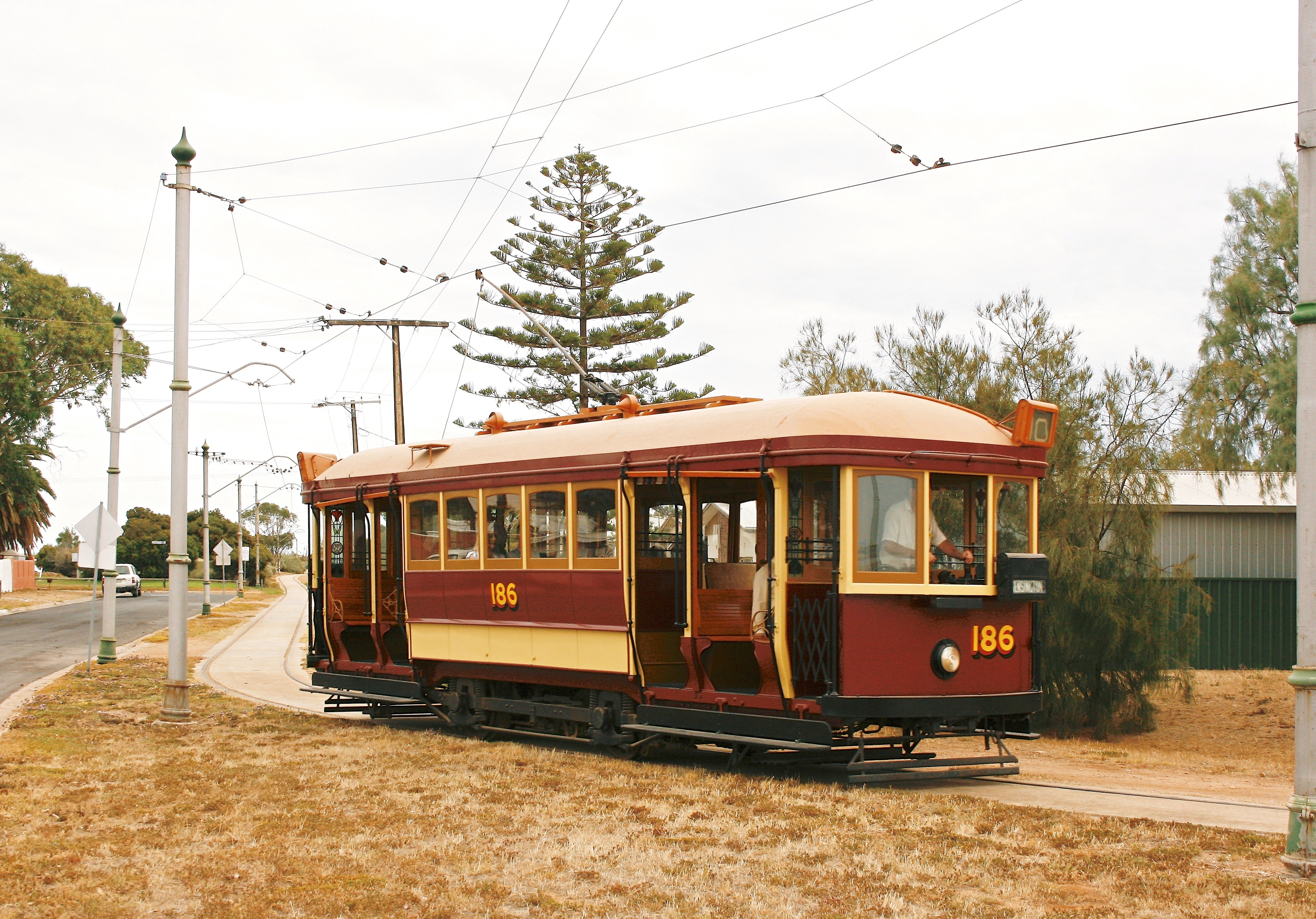
Type C ("Desert Gold" or "Bouncing Billie") tram no. 186, built 1919, leaves Shell Street, St Kilda

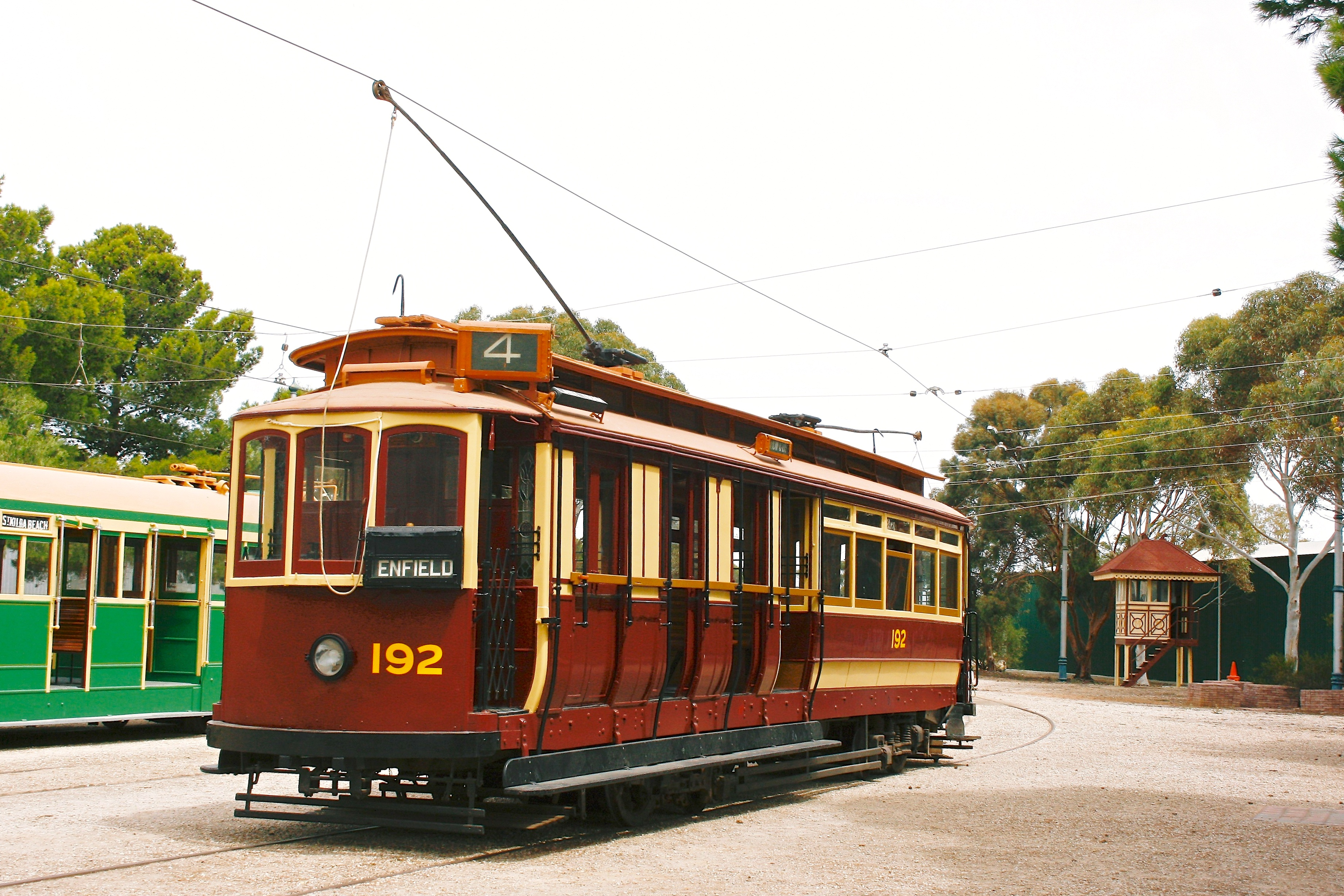
Type D tram no. 192, built 1917, with a tramway signal box in the background

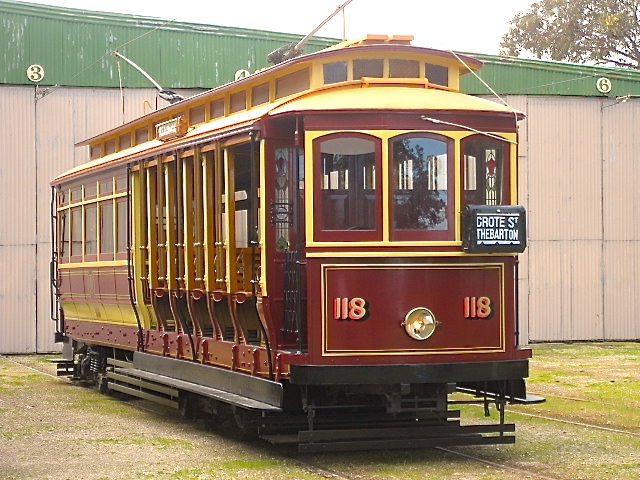
Type E tram no. 118, built 1910

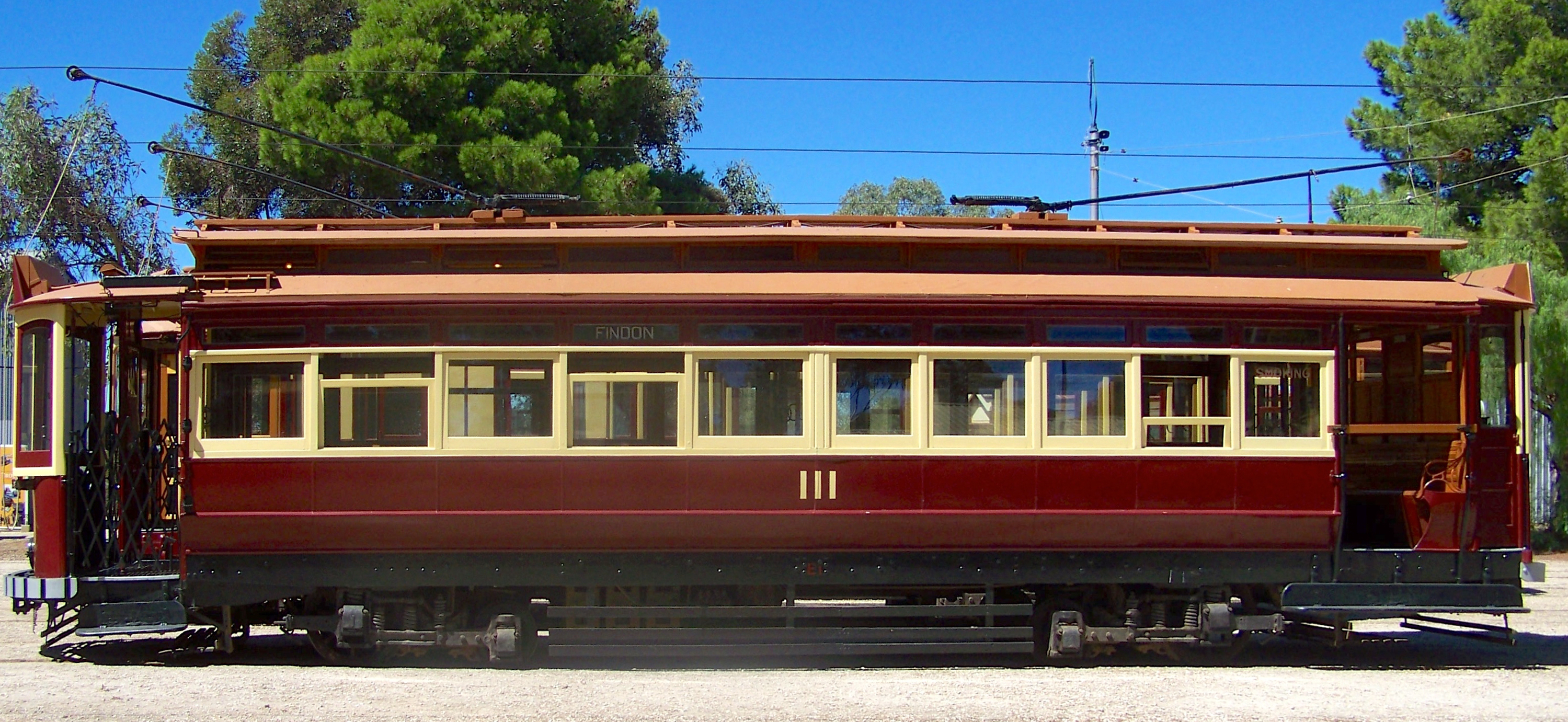
Type E1 tram no. 111, built 1910 as a Type E and converted in 1936; the right-hand end was enclosed (using smaller windows)

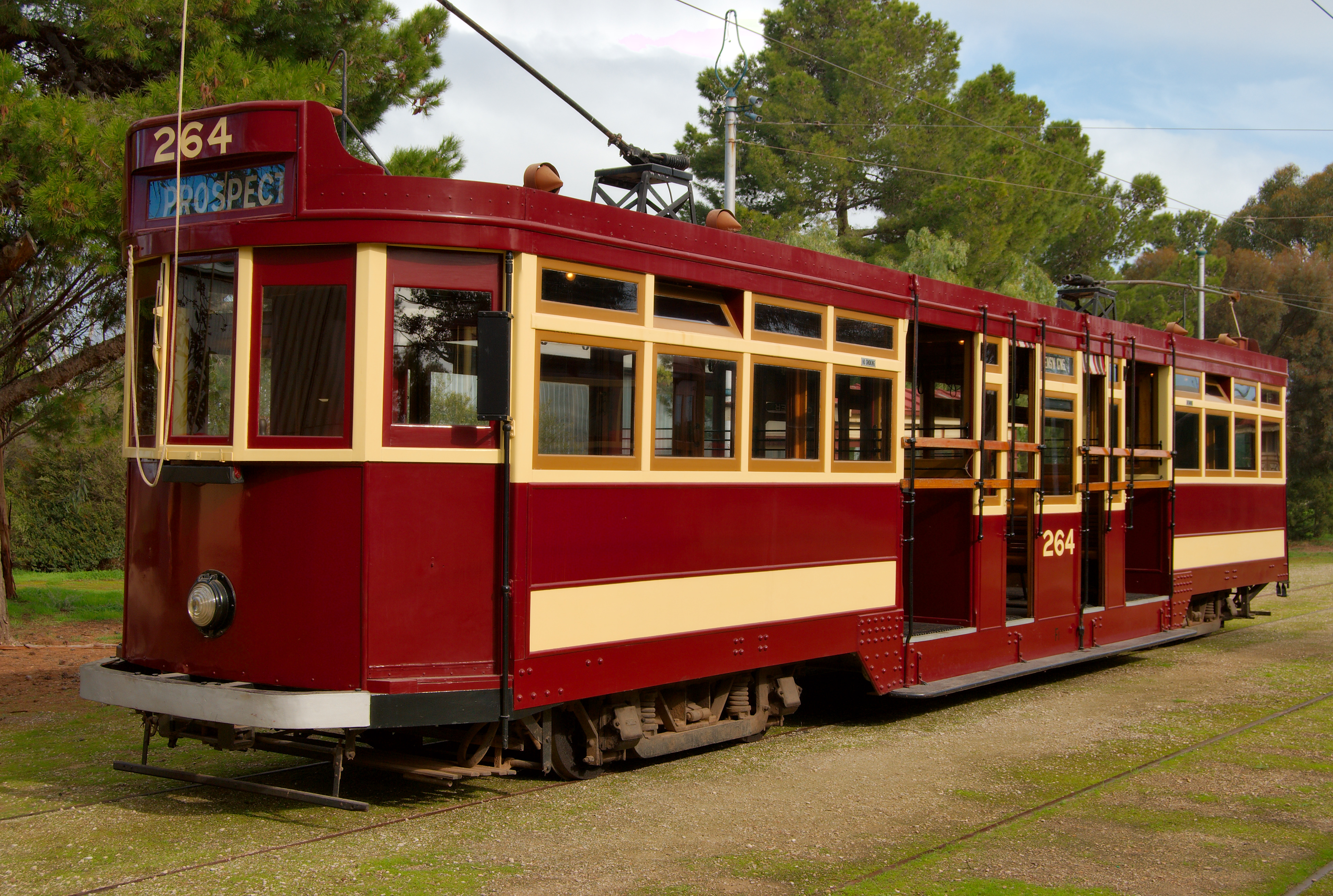
Type F1 tram no. 264, built 1929; 84 almost identical F and F1 types, constructed from 1921 to 1928, were the most numerous of Adelaide's electric trams

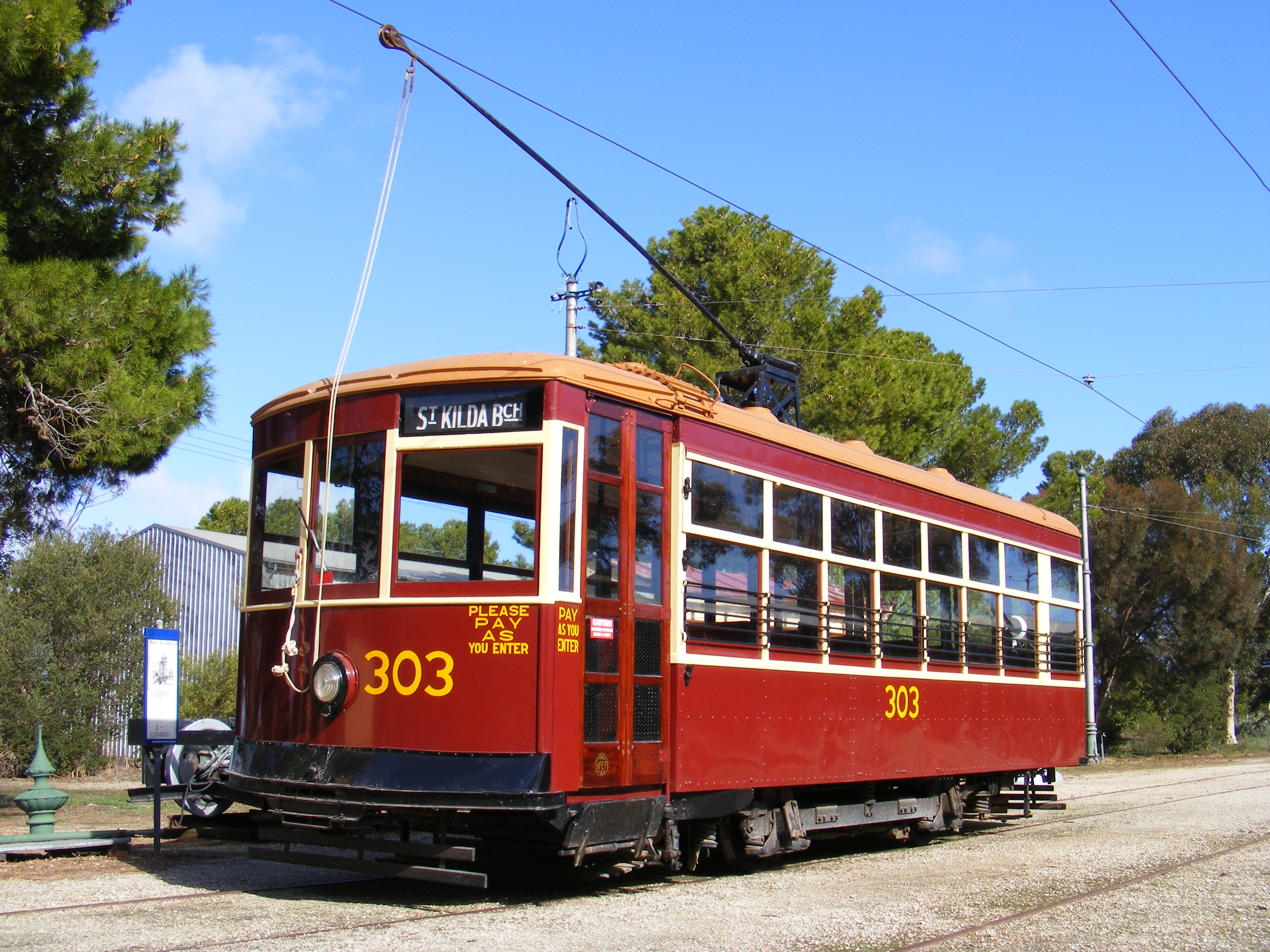
Type G no. 303, a Brill "Birney Safety Car", imported from the US in 1924 to run in Port Adelaide

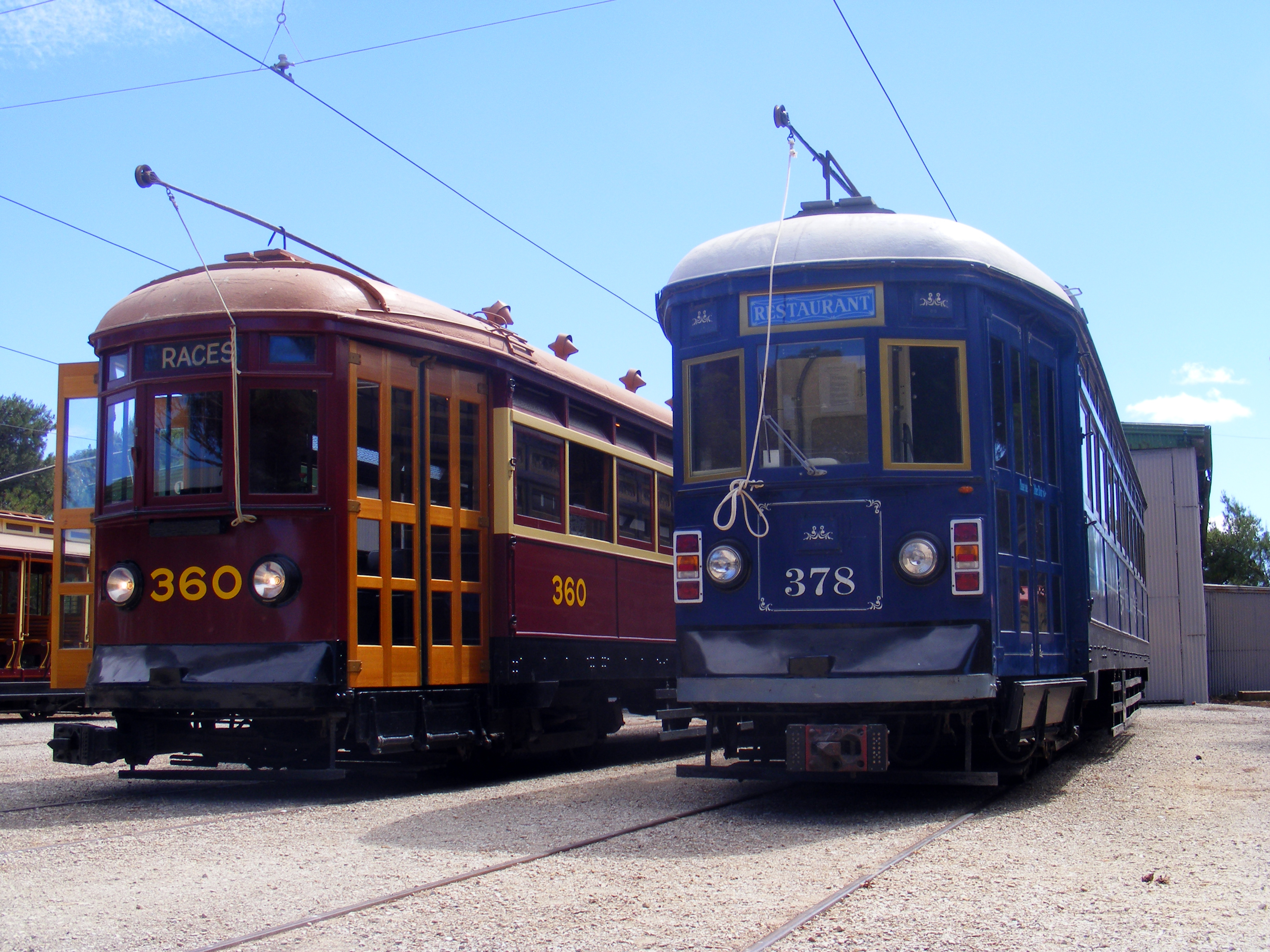
Two Type H ("Glenelg" or "Bay") cars, built 1929; 378 is in its 1990s restaurant car configuration

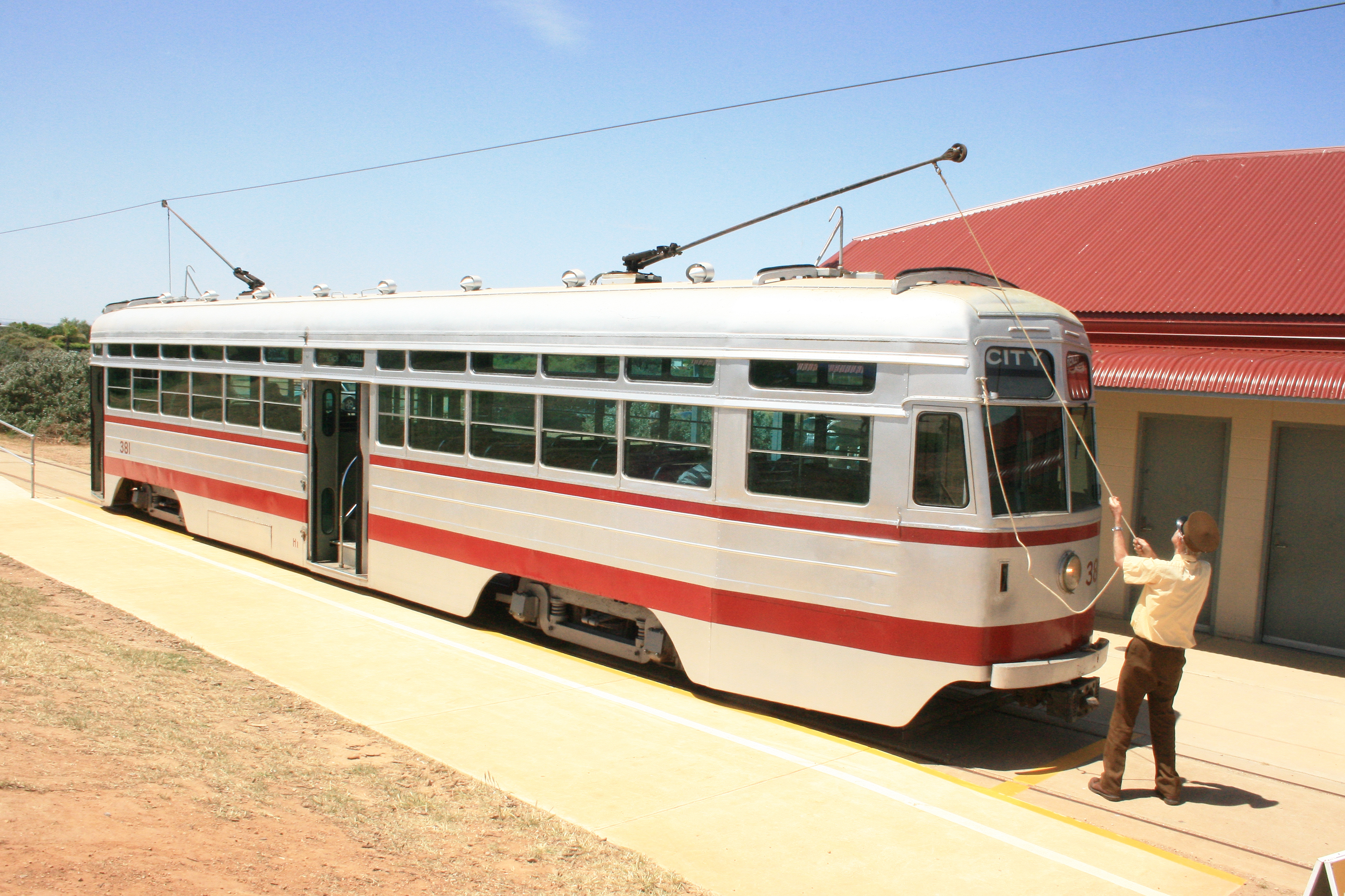
The MTT's last-built tram, the sole Type H1 ("streamliner") no. 381, built 1952

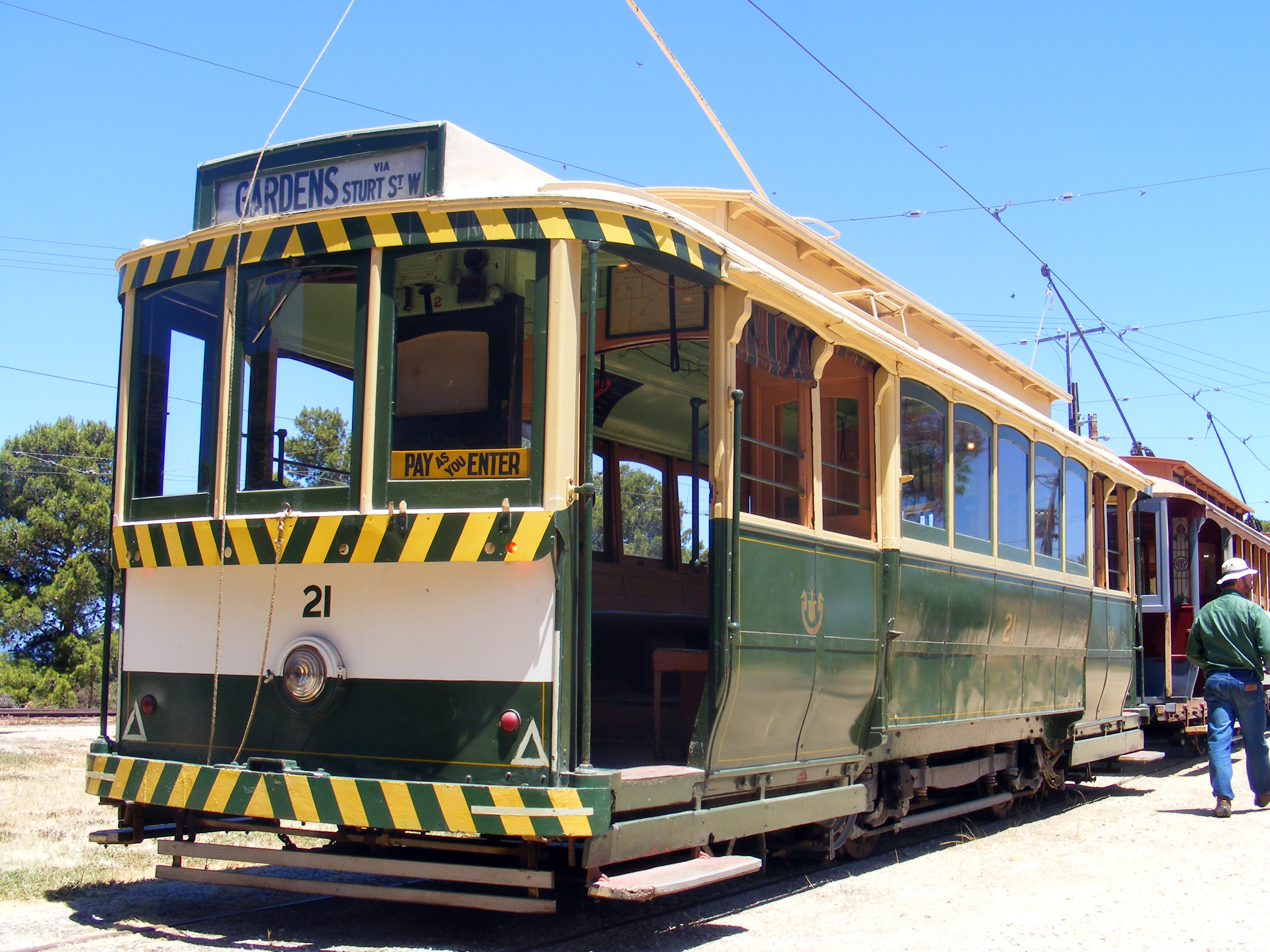
Former Type A tram no. 10, built 1909, was sold to the State Electricity Commission of Victoria in 1936 to run in Ballarat as their no. 21

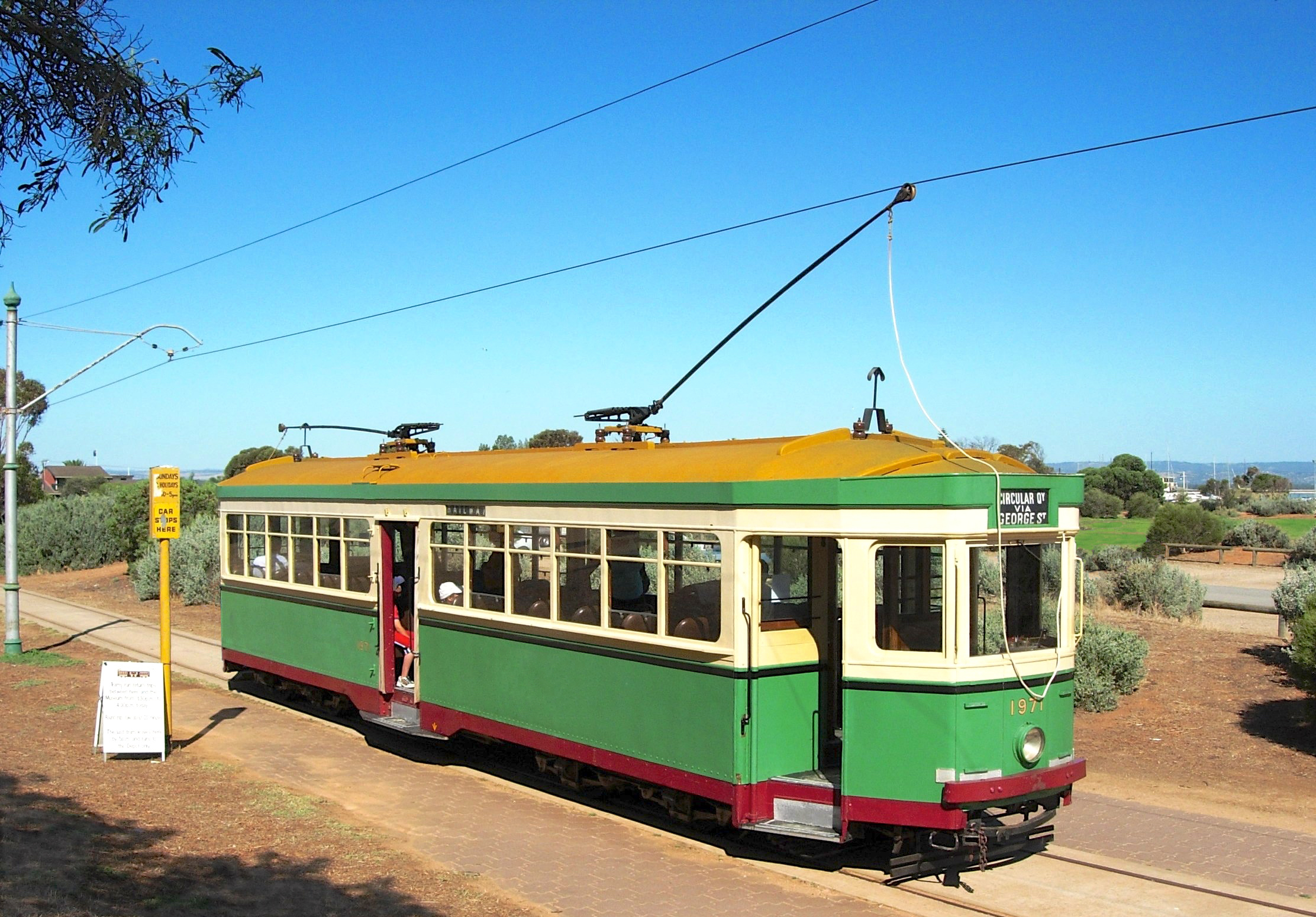
Sydney R1 class tram no. 1971, built 1936, seen at the St Kilda Playground terminus

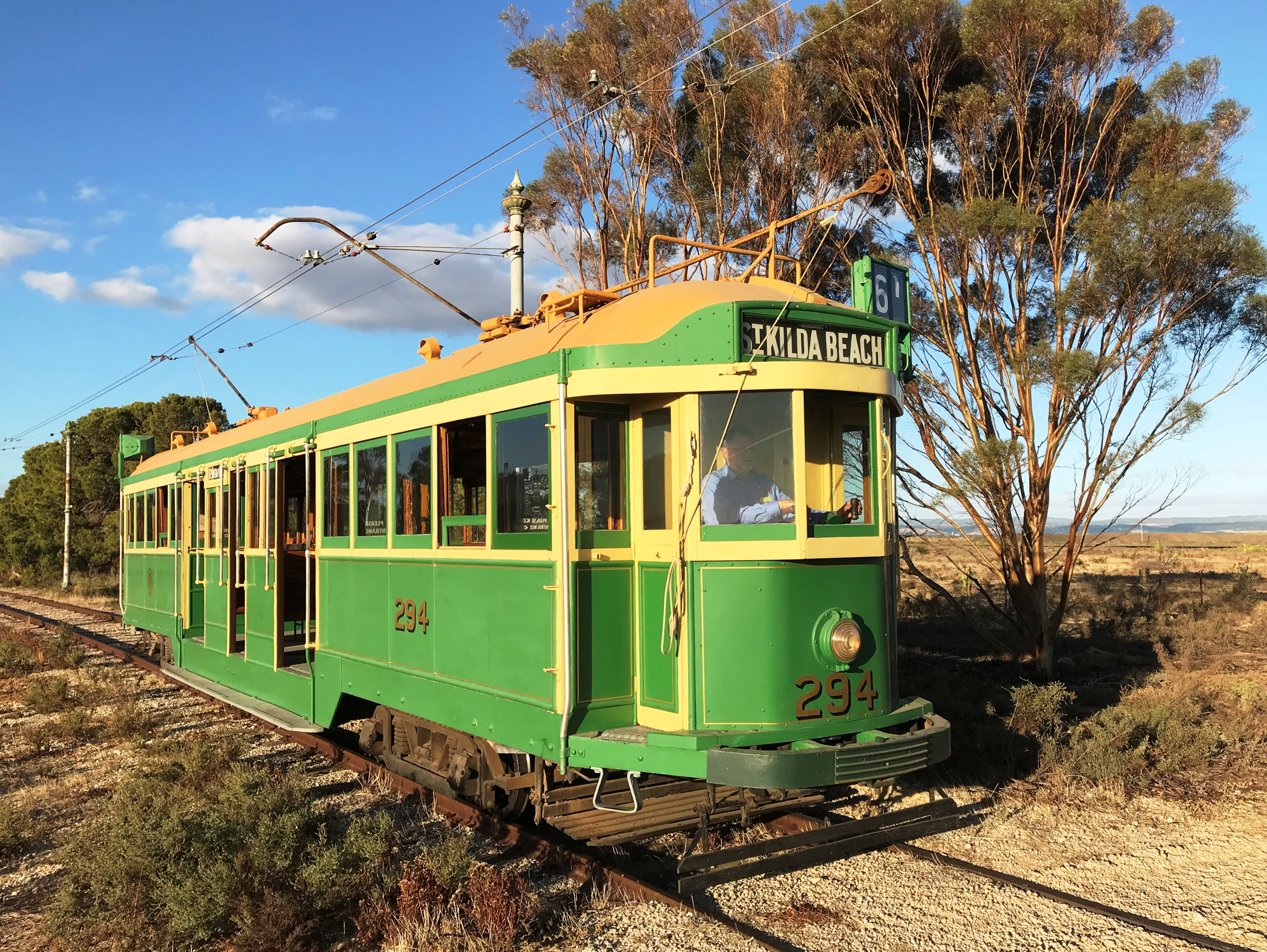
Adelaide-built Melbourne W2 class tram no. 294, built 1924, on the museum's tram line towards the St Kilda Playground terminus

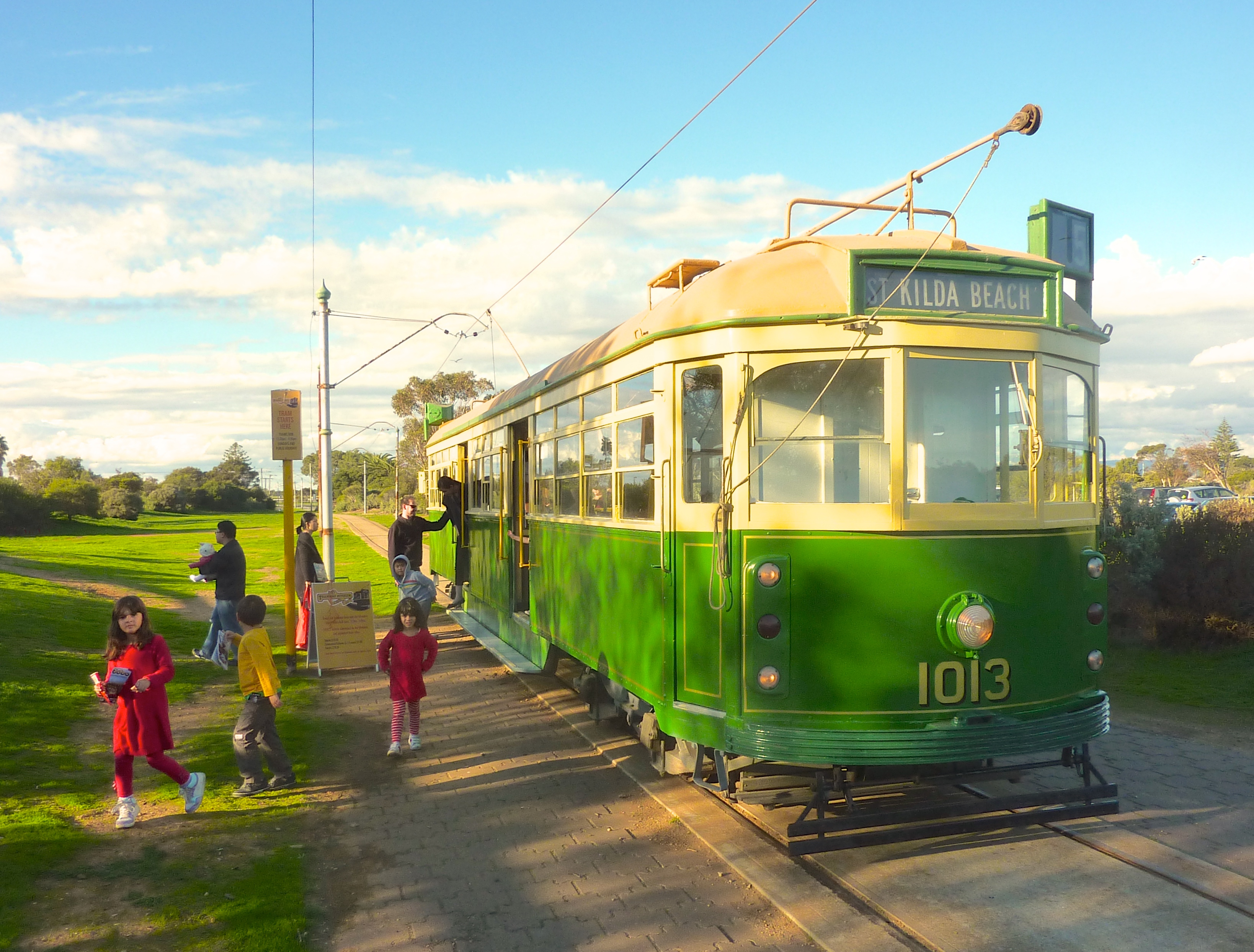
Melbourne W7 class tram no. 1013, built 1955 and modified by the museum for easy wheelchair access, at the St Kilda Playground terminus

== See also ==
- St Kilda adventure playground
- Tram museum website
