= C class Melbourne tram (1913) =

C-class
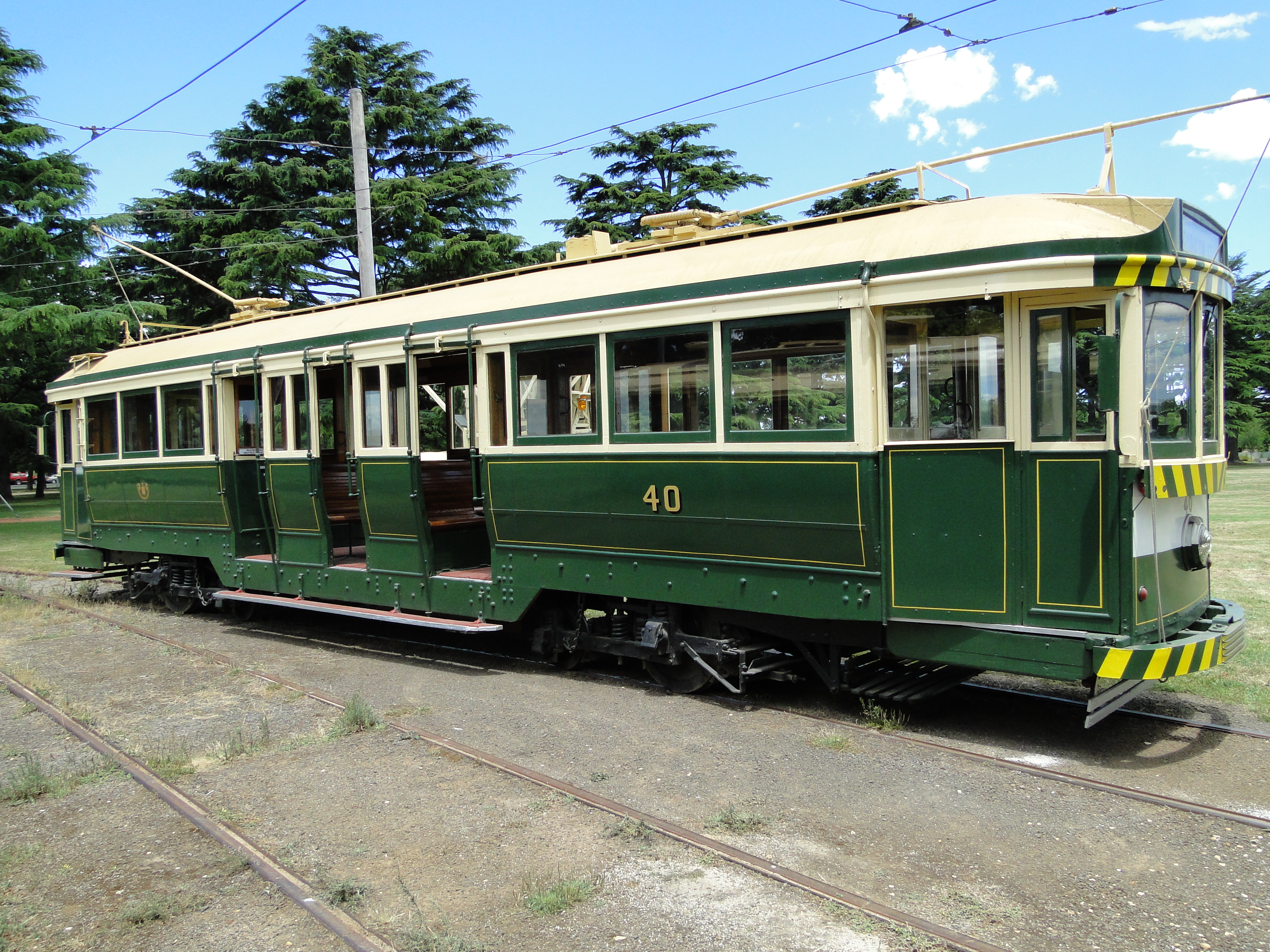
- Manufacturer: Duncan & Fraser
- Assembly: Adelaide
- Constructed: 1913
- Number built: 11
- Fleet numbers: 25-35
- Capacity: 56 as built, 48 as converted

Specifications
- Car length: 13.50 metres (44 ft 3 in)
- Width: 2.62 metres (8 ft 7 in)
- Height: 3.1 metres (10 ft 2 in)
- Wheel diameter: 838 millimetres (33.0 in) (driving); 508 millimetres (20.0 in) (pony)
- Weight: 17.5 tonnes as built, 15.7 tonnes as converted
- Traction motors: 2 x 50 hp GE 202 as built, later 2 x 65 hp GE 201G
- Current collection: Trolley pole
- Bogies: Brush 22E
- Track gauge: 1,435 mm (4 ft 8 1/2 in)

The C-class was a group of 11 trams built by Duncan & Fraser, Adelaide for the Prahran & Malvern Tramways Trust (P&MTT) in 1913, numbered 25 to 35. All retained their fleet numbers when passed to the Melbourne & Metropolitan Tramways Board (M&MTB) on 2 February 1920, after it took over the P&MTT. They were designated C-class sometime after October 1921, and by late 1923, all M&MTB drop-end-and-centre Maximum Traction trams (former D-class, E-class, N-class, and P-class) were grouped together as C-class trams. The 22E Maximum Traction trucks were of JG Brill design, although manufactured by Brush in England.

Between 1918 and 1920, all trams had their 2 x 50 hp GE 202 motors replaced by 2 x 65 hp GE 201G, and in 1920/21 all had their original track and electrical brakes replaced by air brakes. Standard M&MTB destination boxes were built-in to the roof ends to replace their original "Malvern" boxes from 1925, and all had their centre sections modified to resemble a W2-class tram, and were painted green between 1928 and 1932.

In late 1934 and early 1935, numbers 29, and 31 to 34 were scrapped; their electrical equipment was installed in the new CW5-class trams numbered 681 to 685. Some parts from 32 were also used in the construction of scrubber tram No.8. Those not scrapped received route number boxes at about the same time. In 1937 No.30 was converted to transport racing dogs and owners to the Melbourne Showgrounds from Elizabeth Street; it was withdrawn in 1941 when dog racing was suspended after the Royal Australian Air Force occupied the showgrounds. By the late 1930s, many of these trams were in storage, but at least two (26 & 35) were overhauled and had their rear doors blanked-off for service during World War II.

Numbers 25 & 28 were scrapped, and the bodies sold in 1945 and 1944 respectively. In 1948, number 26 was sold to the SEC for use in Geelong as their number 36, and was transferred to Bendigo in 1956, where it became (2nd) No.5 in that fleet. In 1951, 35 was sold to Ballarat as number 40. Number 27 was scrapped in 1949, number 35 was sold to Ballarat where it became their No.40, and number 30 (the 'dog car') was scrapped in 1955.

== Preservation ==
Two have been preserved:

- 26 by the Bendigo Trust as number 5
- 35 by the Ballarat Tramway Museum as number 40
