= O class Melbourne tram =

O-class
- Manufacturer: Duncan & Fraser
- Assembly: Adelaide
- Constructed: 1912
- Number built: 4
- Fleet numbers: 127-130
- Capacity: 54 (as built); 49 (as modified)

Specifications
- Car length: 13.11 m (43 ft 1/8 in) (over bumpers)
- Width: 2.63 m (8 ft 7 9/16 in) (over footboards)
- Height: 3.53 m (11 ft 7 in)
- Wheel diameter: 838 mm (33.0 in) (driving); 508 mm (20.0 in) (pony)
- Weight: 16.6 tonnes / 16.30 tons
- Traction motors: 2 x 50 hp (37 kW) GE 202; 2 x 65 hp (48 kW) GE 201G
- Power supply: 600 Volts DC
- Current collection: Trolley pole with trolley wheel
- Bogies: Brush 22E
- Track gauge: 1,435 mm (4 ft 8 1/2 in)

The O-class Melbourne tram were a group of four trams built in 1912 by Duncan & Fraser (Adelaide) for the Prahran & Malvern Tramways Trust (P&MTT) upon the recommendation of W. G. T. Goodman, Chief Engineer and General manager of the Adelaide tramways. They were allocated P&MTT fleet numbers 21 to 24. At the time of their introduction, they were by far the largest street-vehicles in Melbourne, and earned the nicknames Zeppelins and Dreadnoughts. Proving to be less than satisfactory in service, they were later sold to the Hawthorn Tramways Trust (HTT) in August 1916 as "surplus to requirements", however P&MTT soon ordered replacement tramcars. Coincidentally they retained their fleet numbers (21 to 24) whilst at Hawthorn.

All passed to the Melbourne & Metropolitan Tramways Board (M&MTB) on 2 February 1920, when that body took-over the HTT. Originally known as 'Metropolitan Cars', they were classified as O-class and renumbered 127 to 130 circa 1922. The O-class were the last of Melbourne's Maximum Traction trams to be up-graded from 50 horsepower (37 kW) motors to 65 horsepower (48 kW), which required their Westinghouse T1F controllers being replaced by General Electric (GE) K 36 JR or GE B 23 D controllers at the same time, each tram being so treated between mid 1922 and mid 1923. Initially they were used on the Wattle Park and Burwood routes; the M&MTB transferred them to Glenhuntly depot after it was opened in 1923, and they were known to have been used on the East Brighton line. Due to safety concerns about conductors collecting fares whilst balancing on the footboards, a centre aisle was cut through five of the six cross-bench seats, thus reducing the seating capacity. For reasons not fully understood, these tramcars were more expensive to maintain than other similar types; together with their unpopularity with passengers (unconfirmed reports of doors opening or closing unexpectedly) the O-class were amongst the first electric trams to be disposed of by the M&MTB once sufficient standard W-class trams had been constructed to render smaller groups of older non-standard cars surplus. They were never painted in the M&MTB green livery.

Fifty similar trams had been built between 1910 and 1912 by A. Pengelley & Co for Adelaide's Municipal Tramways Trust as its type D; there were only slight differences in detail between trams of the two manufacturers, such as the Adelaide cars having concave rocker panels rather than convex. Due to this close similarity and compatibility of electrical equipment, the MTT willingly purchased all four O-class trams in late 1926; it is quite likely that the original electrical equipment was re-installed before the four cars were despatched to South Australia. On joining the MTT operational fleet in early 1927, they were renumbered 191 to 194 (from 128, 130, 127, and 129 respectively). The last of this group of four was withdrawn from regular service in 1957.

== Preservation ==
One has been preserved:

- P&MTT/HTT no. 24 / M&MTB no. 130 by the Tramway Museum, St Kilda SA, as Adelaide Municipal Tramways Trust type D no. 192.
