= A. Pengelley & Co =

Australian manufacturer

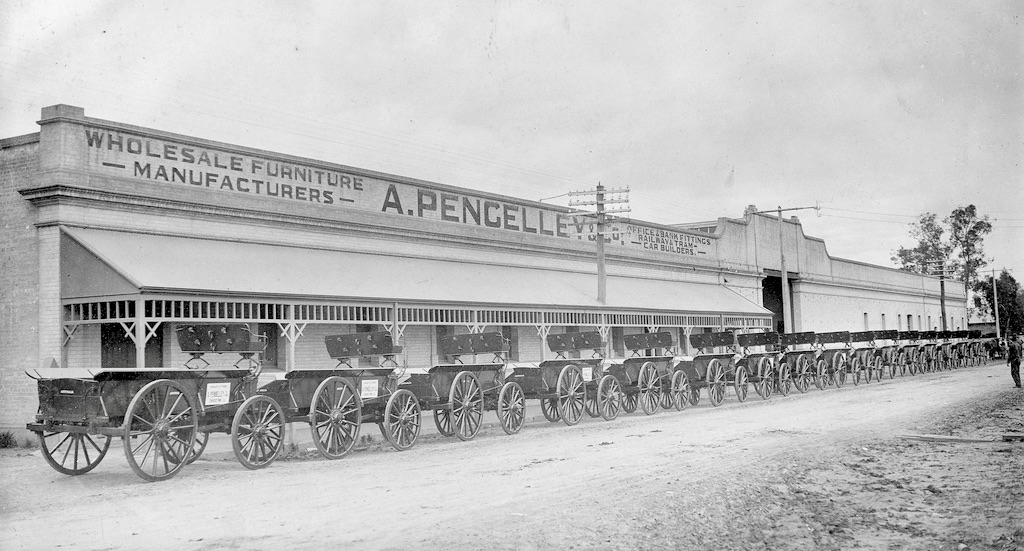
- A fleet of new wagons displayed outside the factory on South Road, Edwardstown about 1918
- Headquarters: South Road, Edwardstown, South Australia
- Products: Furniture; Motor car bodies Railway carriage bodies Tram bodies

A. Pengelley & Co was a manufacturer of furniture, horse-drawn vehicles, motor car bodies and tram and railway rolling stock bodies in Adelaide, South Australia. The company had a 3-acre (1.2-hectare) factory on South Road, Edwardstown.

On 25 December 1913, much of the factory was destroyed by fire, except for the railway carriage and tram construction facilities.

In 1954, the premises were purchased and occupied by the Hills Hoists company to manufacture rotary clothes lines.

== Production ==
The company manufactured a large range of furniture and in the horse-drawn transport era made coaches of various types. It was also successful in tendering for contracts to manufacture wooden bodies (Note: Undergear, braking and control systems were imported from the UK and US.) for trams and railway passenger cars, including the following:

| Year | Buyer | Qty | Product |
|---|---|---|---|
| 1910–1912 | Municipal Tramways Trust | 70 | Bodies for types D (50) and E (20) electric trams. Strong public opposition to overseas manufacture ensured that the Type E bodies were manufactured by the J.G. Brill Company in Philadelphia, erected there, dismantled and packed, and re-erected by Pengelley. |
| 1912–1913 | South Australian Railways | 11 | Bodies for use on the Holdfast Bay railway line |
| 1912–1914 | South Australian Railways | 25 | Bodies for end-and-centre-loading passenger cars |
| 1913 | Victorian Railways | 8 | Tram bodies for the St Kilda to Brighton Beach tramway |
| 1916 | Commonwealth Railways | 4 | Bodies for D class dining cars (Trans-Australian Railway) |
| 1921–1929 | Municipal Tramways Trust | 81 | Bodies for 50 type F trams and 31 of their steel-framed F1 variant |
| 1923–1924 | South Australian Railways | 10 | Bodies for end-and-centre-loading passenger cars |
| 1924–1925 | State Electricity Commission of Victoria | 8 | Bodies for Geelong system trams |
| 1929 | Municipal Tramways Trust | 30 | Bodies for 30 type H interurban-style trams to run on the newly electrified Glenelg tram line |

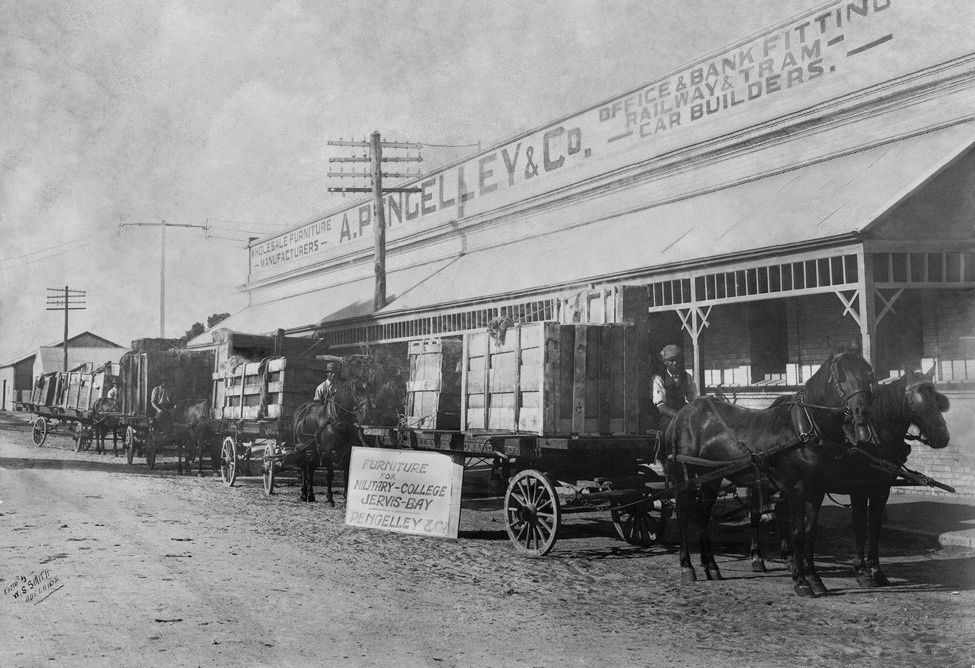

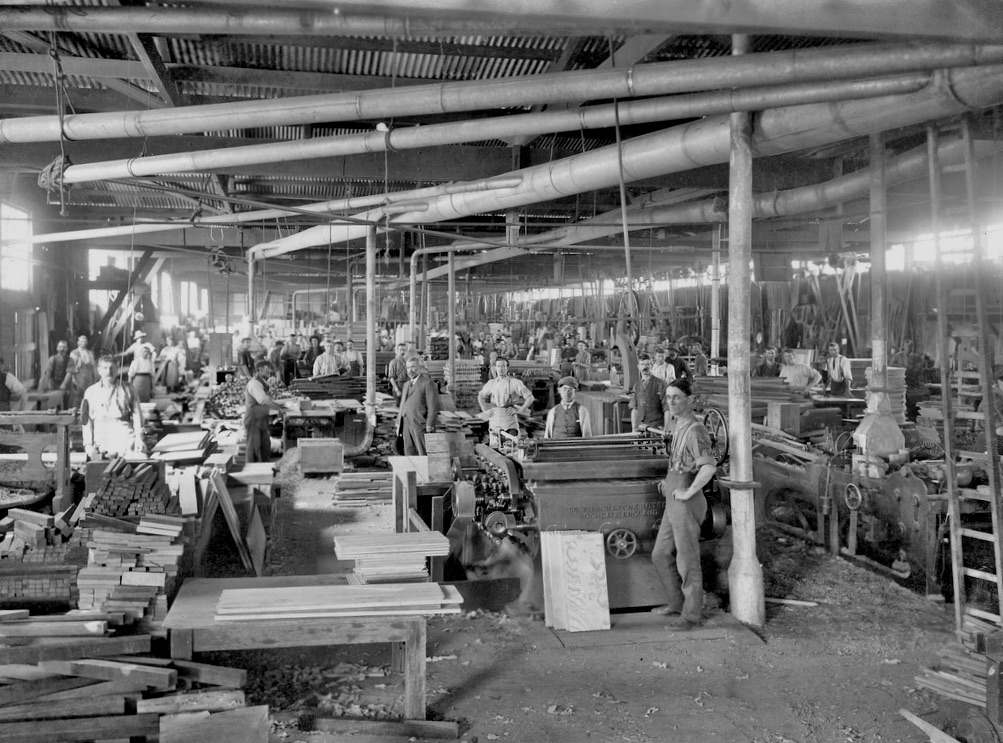

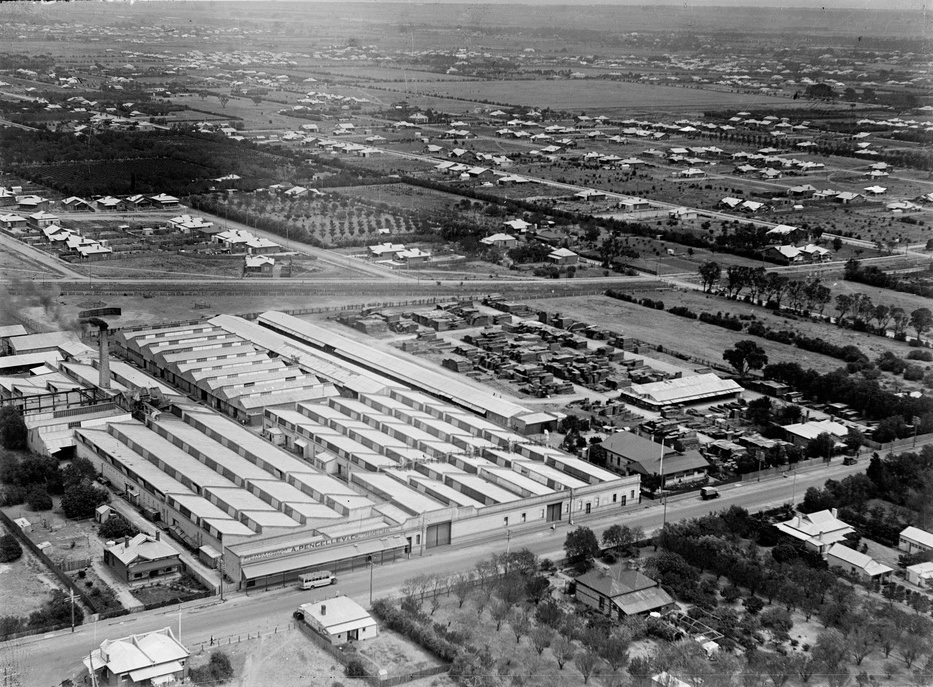

Carts outside the factory carrying furniture made for the Royal Military College, about 1910

Interior of the factory about 1913, before the huge fire

The factory about 1934, looking north-west; South Road is in the foreground

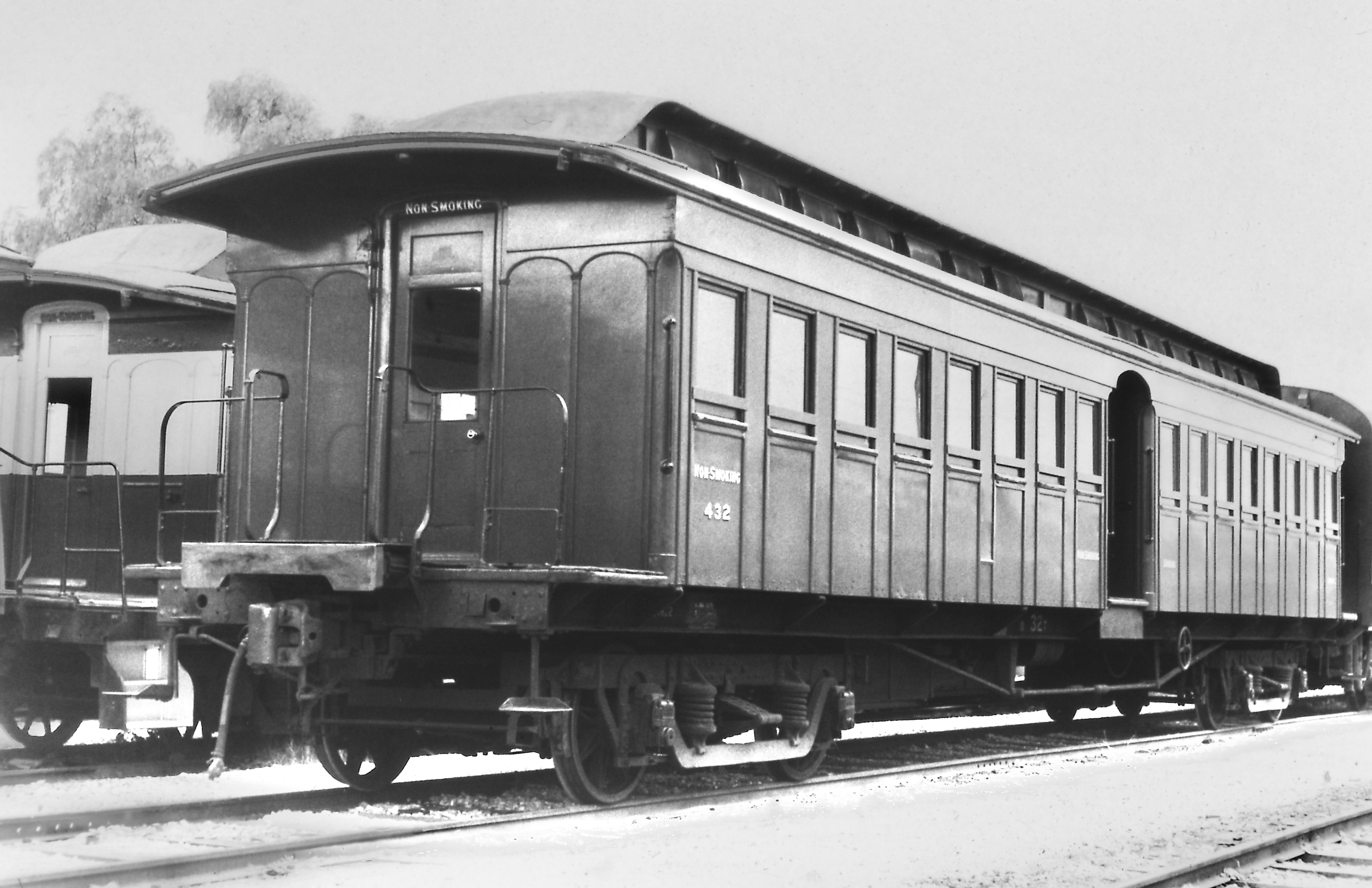

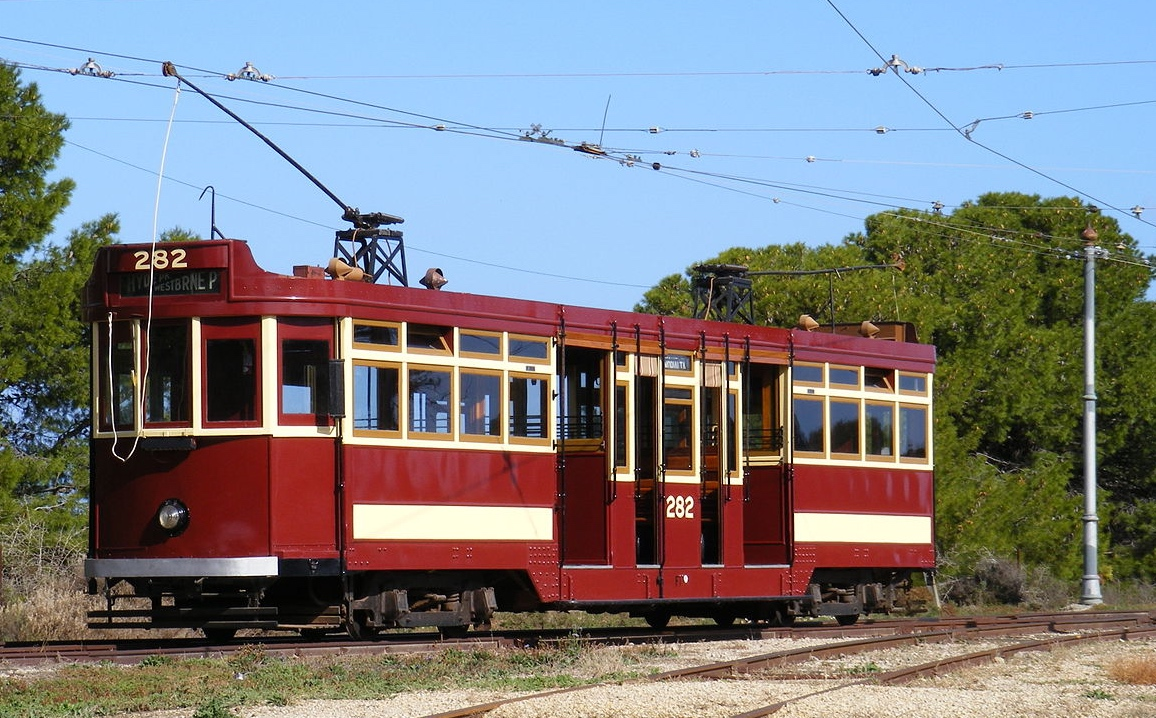

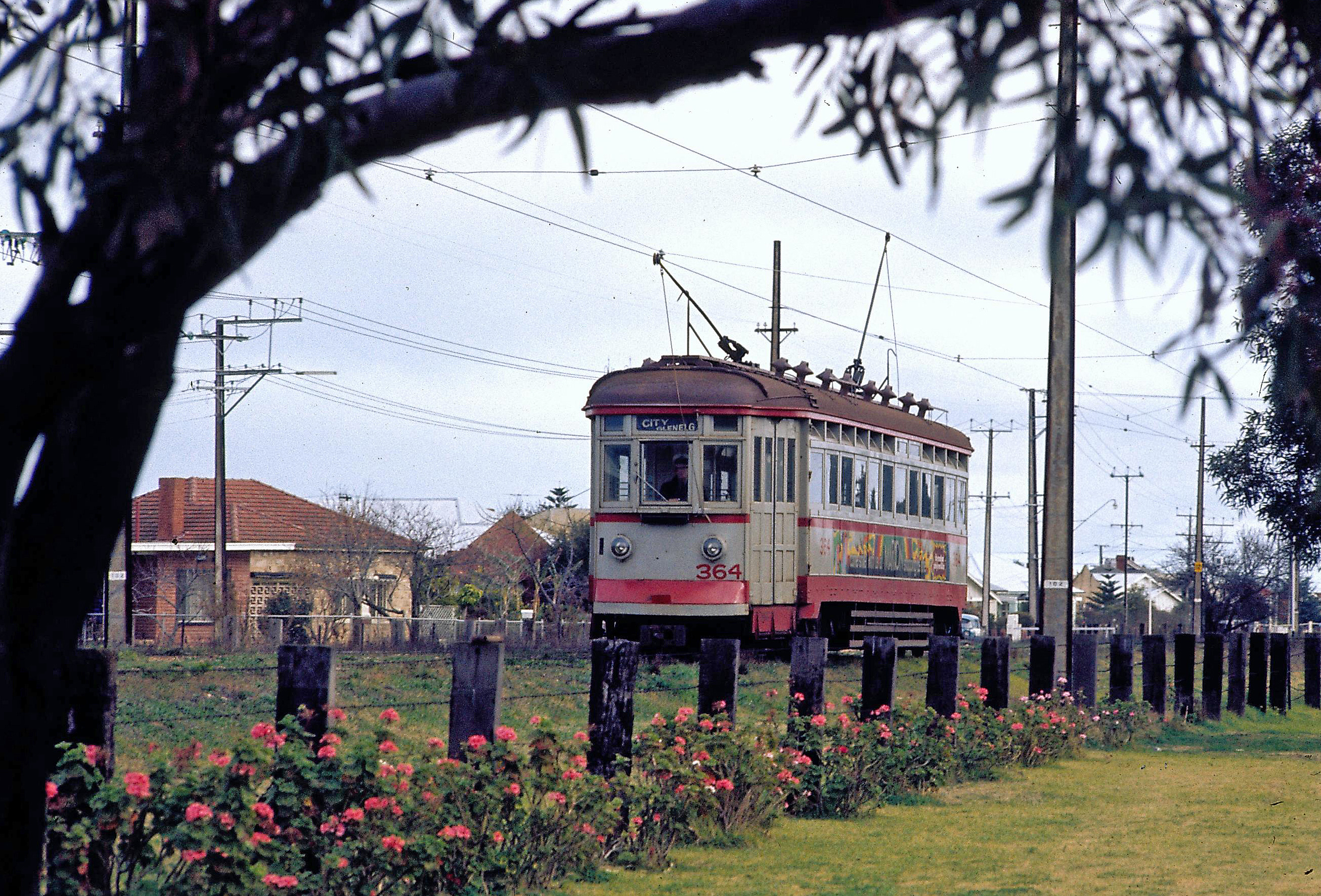

Pengelley built 35 end-loading passenger car bodies of this design for the South Australian Railways in 1912–14 and 1923–24

The company built 81 Type F and F1 trams for the Municipal Tramways Trust between 1921 and 1928; no. 282 now runs at the Tramway Museum, St Kilda, South Australia

In 1929, Pengelley built all 30 of the Type H "Bay" trams that ran at speed on the 9.2 kilometres (5.7 miles) private right-of-way of the Glenelg line, and on some suburban lines
