= C type Adelaide tram =

Class of 20th-century tram in Adelaide

C type
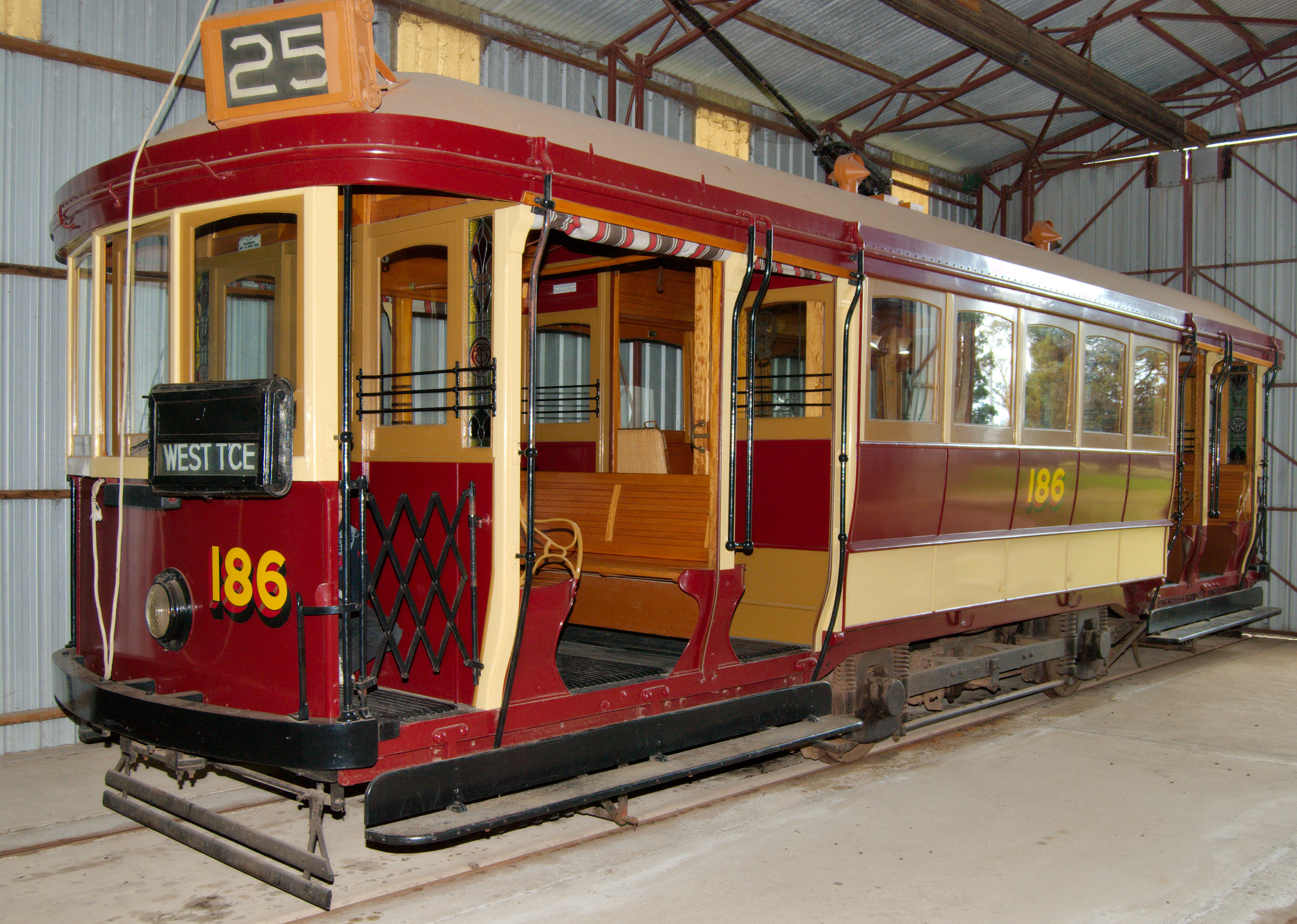
- C186 at the Tramway Museum, St Kilda in November 2008
- Manufacturer: Duncan & Fraser
- Assembly: Adelaide
- Constructed: 1918
- Number built: 20
- Fleet numbers: 171-190
- Capacity: 40

Specifications
- Car length: 10.36 metres
- Width: 2.41 metres
- Height: 3.18 metres
- Weight: 11.2 tonnes
- Traction motors: 2 x 50hp General Electric 202s
- Current collector(s): Trolley pole
- Bogies: JG Brill Company 21E
- Track gauge: 1,435 mm (4 ft 8 1/2 in)

The C type Adelaide tram was a class of 20 drop end, California combination trams built by Duncan & Fraser, Adelaide in 1918 for the Municipal Tramways Trust (MTT). All were delivered in 1918, but as they were receiving second-hand motors from the E type trams, the last did not enter service until September 1919. When the MTT introduced an alpha classification system in 1923, they were designated the C type.

Because they were much faster than existing trams, they were nicknamed Desert Golds after a contemporary racehorse. At least 10 were transferred to the isolated Port Adelaide network in 1930, the last returning after the Albert Park line closed in November 1934. The last was withdrawn in 1953.

== Preservation ==
One has been preserved:

- 186 by the Tramway Museum, St Kilda
