= Trams in Australia =

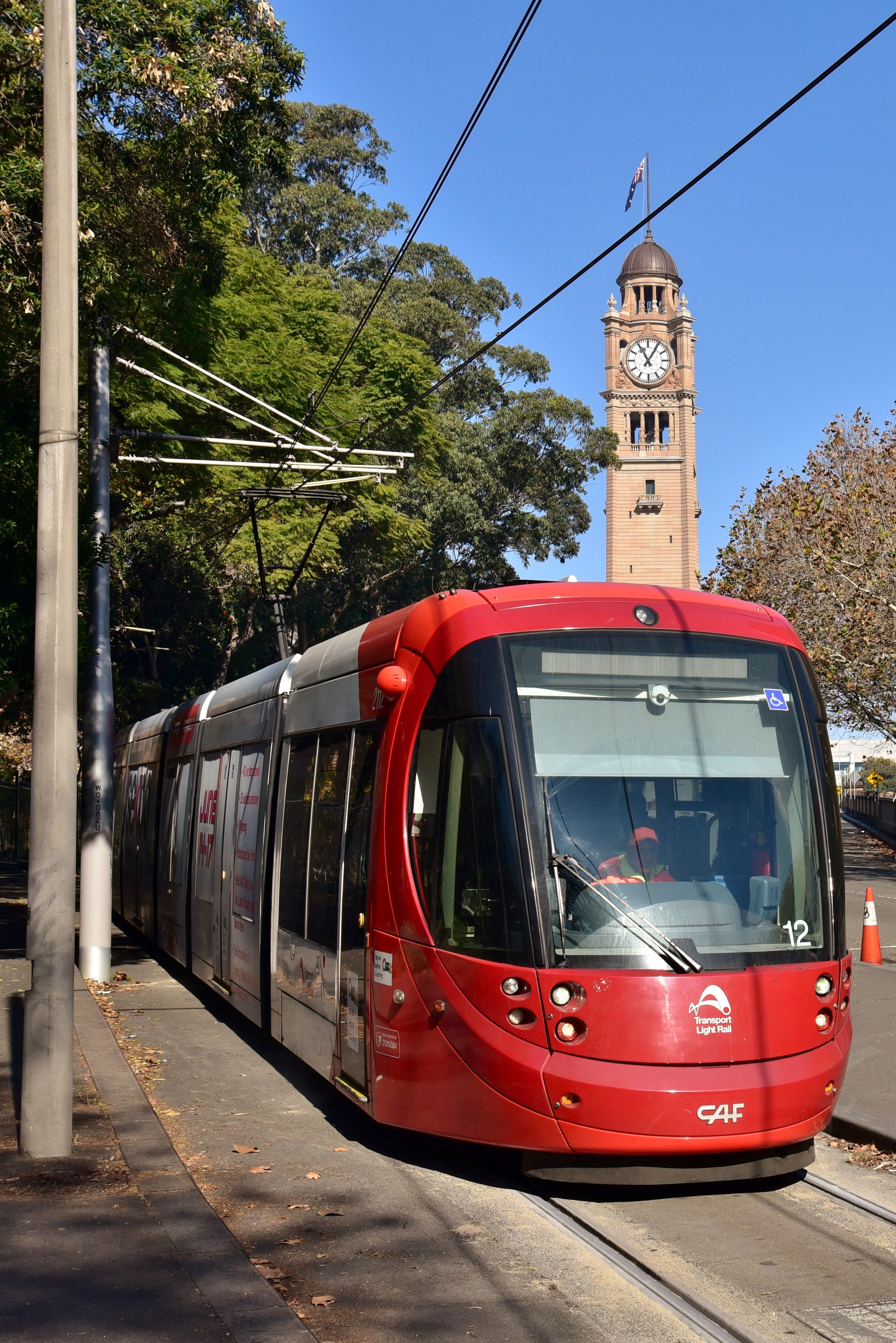
A Sydney Light Rail Urbos 3 tram

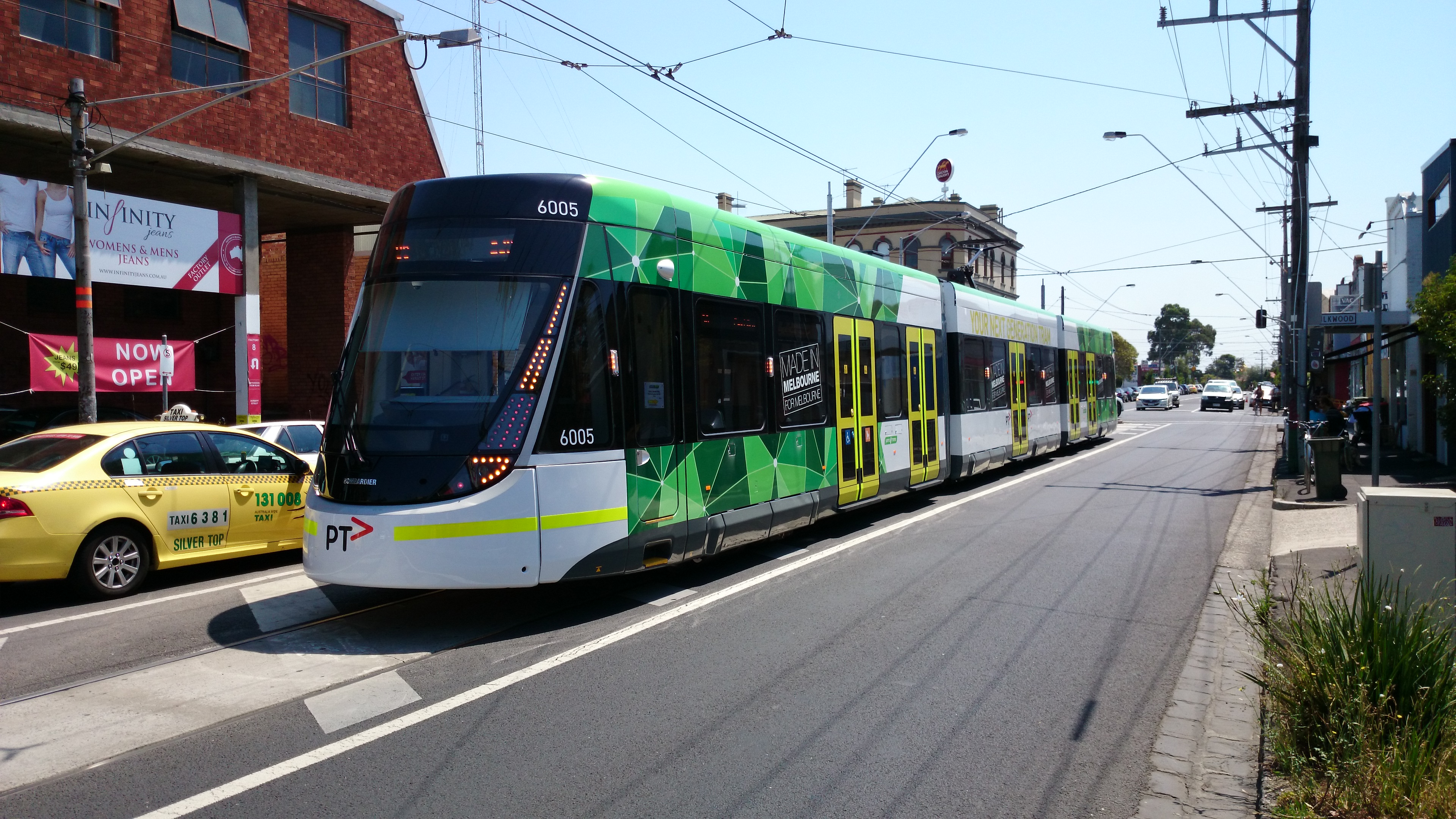
A modern low-floor E class tram, as used on the Melbourne network.

The earliest trams in Australia operated in the latter decades of the 19th century, hauled by horses or "steam tram motors" (also known as "steam dummies"). At the turn of the 20th century, propulsion almost universally turned to electrification, although cable trams (established in 1885) lingered in Melbourne. In cities and towns that had trams, they were a major part of public transport assets.

In the middle of the 20th century trams fell out of favour, in part because of deferred maintenance during World War II and declining patronage resulting from increased private car ownership. Lines were closed or severely cut back except in Melbourne: its network of 24 routes covering 250 km (155 mi) is now the largest in the world.

Since the turn of the 21st century tramway networks have been reconstructed in Sydney and in Newcastle, extended in Adelaide and brand new systems have been built on the Gold Coast and in Canberra (marking the first time these two cities have had trams).

Restored vintage trams are very popular in their various forms. Most operate on sections of former operational lines such as at Bendigo and at Ballarat in Victoria or on purpose-built tracks in association with museums such as at St Kilda, at Whiteman Park, and at Launceston. Less authentic but invariably popular are replica trams that offer tourist experiences such as in Victor Harbor and in Portland.

== History ==
In the 19th century numerous horse drawn systems were established, with Adelaide and Brisbane establishing reasonably large systems (for their day) and retaining their horse-drawn trams when other systems had adopted steam or cable traction. Victor Harbor and Gawler in South Australia are examples of small, single-line horse-drawn systems which survived until 1955 and 1931 respectively; the Victor Harbor tramway reopened in 1986.

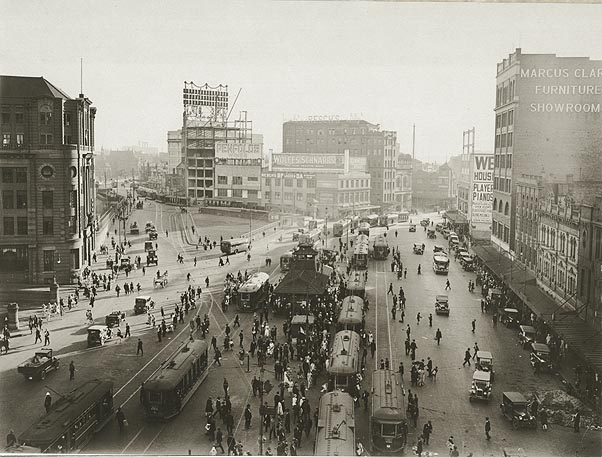
Trams at Railway Square in Sydney

Following a short lived experiment with a privately run horse tram line in Pitt Street in the 1860s, Sydney adopted steam trams, which were operated by the state government. By comparison, Melbourne adopted cable trams, the infrastructure (tracks and winding-houses) was owned collectively by the local municipal councils, but operated initially by a private company. The Melbourne cable tramway system became arguably the largest in the world in the late 19th century, with some cable lines retained until 1940. Sydney operated only two cable tram lines (in North Sydney and along New South Head Road) and eschewed the high capital outlay required for cable traction, preferring instead to retain their steam trams, until most of the system was converted to electric operation between 1898 and 1910.

Smaller provincial towns in New South Wales, such as Maitland, Broken Hill and Newcastle had steam tram systems operated by the New South Wales Government. Rockhampton, Queensland, also had a steam tram system, which was operated by the City of Rockhampton. With the exception of Newcastle, these systems had closed by the 1930s.

Gold mining towns, with their rapid growth and wealth soon adopted trams, with Bendigo and Ballarat in Victoria and Kalgoorlie and Leonora in Western Australia all adopting electric tram systems. Bendigo initially opened a battery-operated tramline to Eaglehawk, but as this proved unsuccessful it was replaced by steam-trams; these were electrified and expanded circa 1902. Ballarat electrified their horse tram network shortly after. These two Victorian systems survived until 1972 and 1971 respectively, following their takeover by the state government through the State Electricity Commission, whereas the West Australian examples ceased operations in the 1950s as a result of the economic decline of those towns at the time.

Electrification of Australian tram systems was adopted early, with Hobart and Brisbane becoming the first cities to electrify their networks in 1893 and 1897, respectively. Hobart was thus the first city in the Southern Hemisphere to operate a successful electric tramway system. It was also the only Australian city to use the European-style bow collector, instead of Frank Sprague's trolley pole system. Hobart was also the first city outside Europe to employ electric double-decker trams. The Hobart system retained a distinctly "English" appearance throughout its existence.

Perth had an electric tram system in operation between 1898 and 1958. Adelaide was the last major city to convert its trams to electric operation, in 1908, with the system closing (except for the Glenelg tram line) in 1958. However, Melbourne did not complete its cable tram electrification program until 1956 when today's route 96 opened, having been converted from a diesel bus which had replaced the cable tram.

A distinctive feature of many Australasian trams was the drop-centre, a lowered central section between bogies (wheel-sets), to make passenger access easier by reducing the number of steps required to get inside of the vehicle. One school of thought proposes that these were derived from Hedley-Doyle stepless car, (named after two employees of the New York Railways Company), two of which came to Australia: the "Big Lizzie" of Brisbane supplied by JG Brill Company in 1913, and the "New York" car (I class number 63) of the Perth tramways in 1914. A more plausible genesis is that the design evolved locally, as evidenced by a number of drop-centre trams appearing prior to the 1912 New York design.

== Patronage ==
The following table lists tram patronage figures (in millions of journeys) during the 2017–18 and 2018–19 financial years (1 July to 30 June).

City	Patronage (millions) 2017–18	Ref	Patronage (millions) 2018–19	Ref
Melbourne	206.3		205.4	
Sydney	10.26		11.12	
Gold Coast	9.49		10.74	
Adelaide	9.48		9.45	

== Networks ==
=== Timeline – all tramways ===
Legend

- Yellow = historical passenger network
- Green = existing continuously operated tram network (more than one line)
- Blue = reduced size single line or tourist railway
- Red = replica tourist tram only
- Orange = contemporary tram or light rail public transit network
- Grey = proposed

=== Australian Capital Territory ===
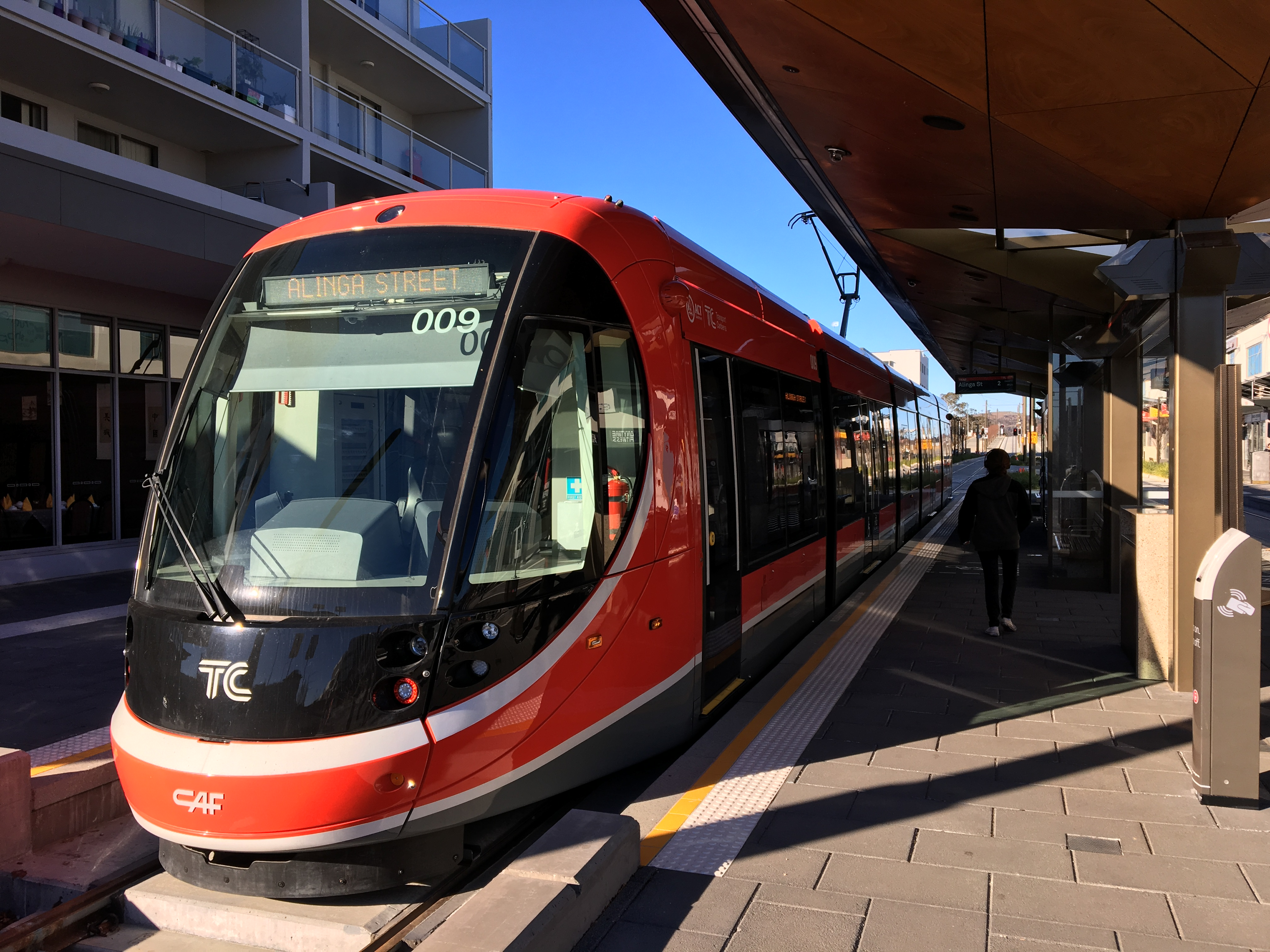
Tram at Gungahlin Place, Canberra, in 2019

A light rail system serving Australia's national capital, Canberra, opened in April 2019. The initial line links the northern suburb of Gungahlin to the city centre (Civic). An extension to the southern suburb of Woden has been announced.

=== New South Wales ===
==== Broken Hill ====
A steam tramway service operated in Broken Hill from 1902 until its closure in December 1926.

==== Maitland ====
Opening of the Maitland Tramway in 1909

A steam tram line connected East and West Maitland between 1909 and 1926. The line ran from Victoria Street station in East Maitland along High Street, West Maitland crossing the 'Long Bridge' and terminated in the suburb of Campbells Hill. There was single track branch from High Street, West Maitland running along Church Street to West Maitland station. This branch line closed in 1915.

There were proposals to extend the line westwards from Campbells Hill to Rutherford but these never eventuated. There were proposals to electrify the service in 1921 but instead it was decided to withdraw the service. The tramway closed on 31 December 1926.

==== Newcastle ====
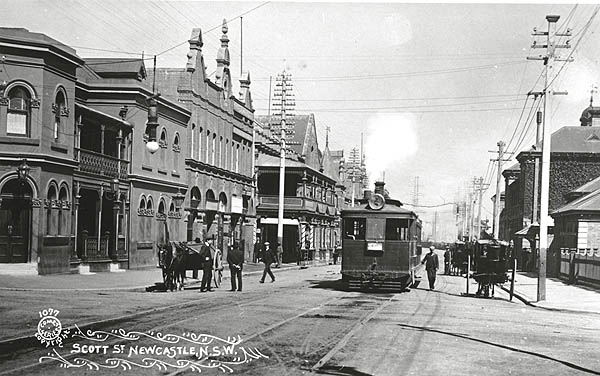
Tram in Scott Street, Newcastle near the turn of the 20th century

A steam tram system operated in Newcastle, New South Wales from 1887, with a branch to West Wallsend. It was electrified in 1923–26. The last line closed in 1950.

The construction of the a modern system was announced in 2014. The Newcastle Light Rail opened in February 2019.

==== Sydney ====
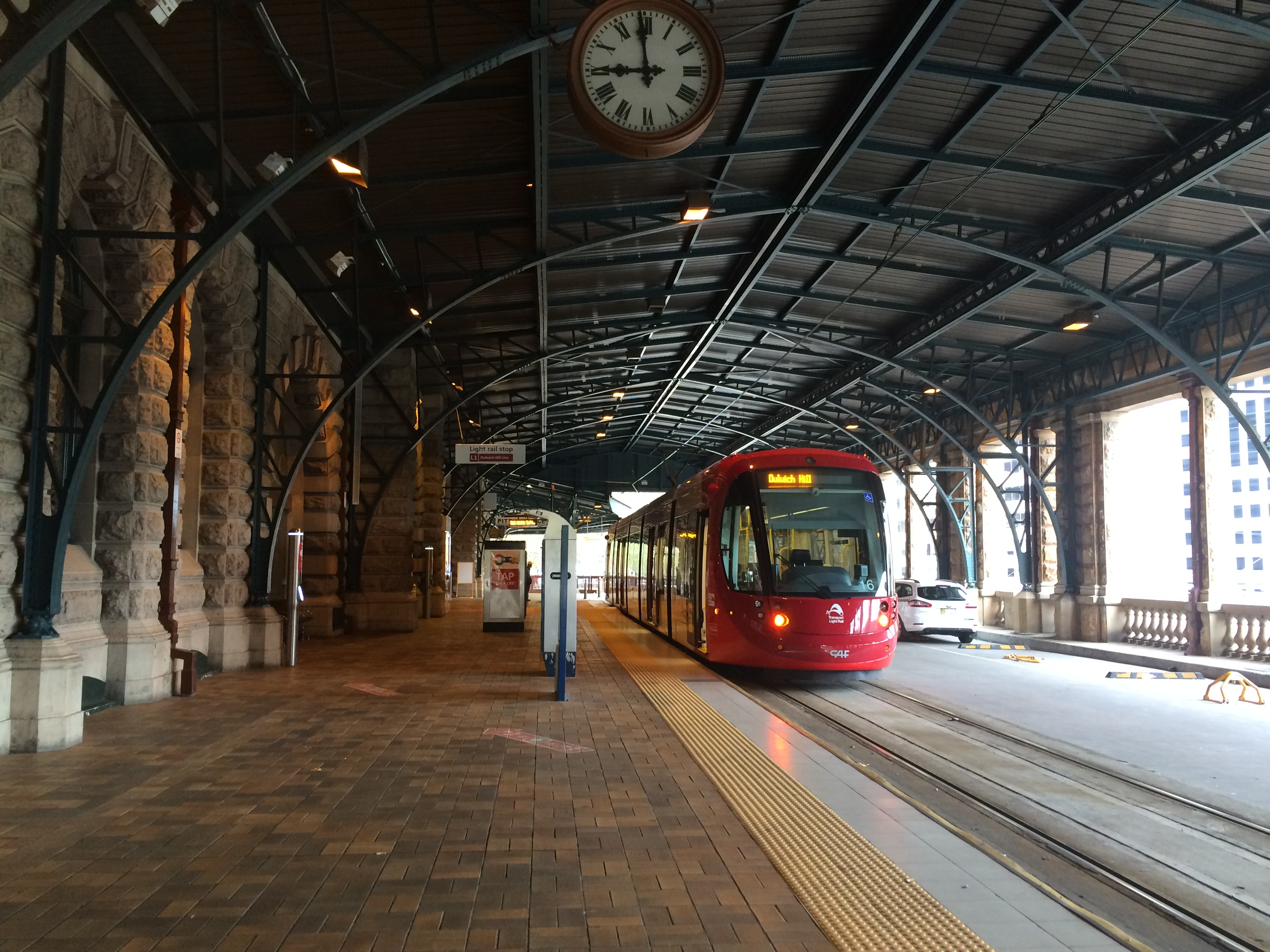
The Inner West Light Rail has reutilised the platforms at Central station formerly used by Sydney's tram network.

Sydney once had an extensive tram system, having been in place since 1879, with a short-lived earlier line opened between 1861 and 1866. The system was hugely popular by the 20th century, with an average of more than one tram journey per day made by every man and woman and child in the city. Patronage peaked at over 400 million people per annum in 1945. The use of trams in Sydney declined in the 1950s and the system was closed entirely in 1961, replaced by buses. It had a maximum street mileage of 291 km (181 mi) in 1923 making it the largest in the Southern Hemisphere and second largest in the British Empire after London.

In 1997, more than 30 years after trams disappeared from Sydney streets, they were reintroduced in the form of a small light rail system. A single line was opened between Central station and Pyrmont, mostly utilising a former goods railway, which was extended along the remaining section of disused railway to Lilyfield in the Inner West in 2000. Following a further cut back to the city's freight rail network, a south-western extension to Dulwich Hill opened in 2014. A second line from the CBD and to Randwick opened in December 2019, with an additional branch to Kingsford having opened in March 2020.

A fourth line through Parramatta opened in 2024 between Westmead and Carlingford. A fifth line between the existing Parramatta line and Sydney Olympic Park is currently under construction.

=== Queensland ===
==== Brisbane ====
Brisbane trams in the 1930s

The Brisbane Tram System was operational from 1885 to 1969.

Brisbane's tram system ran on standard gauge track. The electric system was originally energised to 500 volts, this was subsequently increased to 600 volts.

Most trams operated with a two-person crew – a driver (or motorman) and a conductor, who moved about the tram collecting fares and issuing tickets. The exceptions to this arrangement were on the Gardens line (Lower Edward Street) where the short duration of the trip meant it was more effective for passengers to simply drop their fare into a fare box as they entered the tram; and the "one man cars" which operated in the early 1930s (see below).

The network reached its maximum extent of 109 kilometres in 1952. The total track length was 199 kilometres, owing to many routes ending in single, rather than double, track. Single track segments of the track were protected by signalling which operated off the trolley wire. By 1959, more than 140 kilometres of track were laid in concrete, a method of track construction pioneered in Brisbane.

The last track opened was in O'Keefe Street Woolloongabba, in May 1961. However, this track was not used in normal passenger service and was merely used to reduce dead running from Logan Road back to Ipswich Road Depot.

The peak year for patronage was 1944–45, with almost 160 million passenger journeys recorded.

==== Gold Coast ====
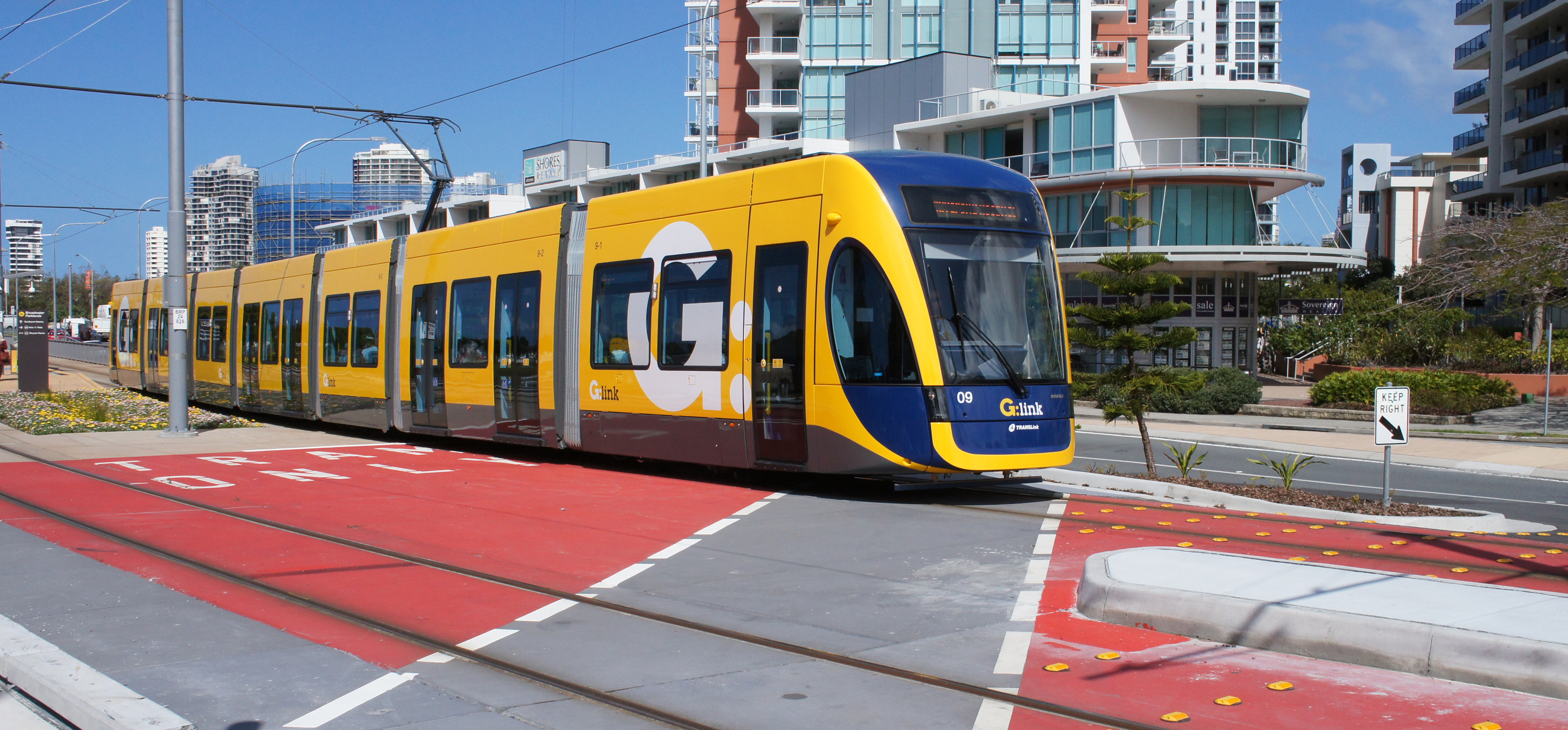
G:link Flexity 2 tram on the Gold Coast

The first modern light rail system in Queensland opened on the Gold Coast in 2014. Called G:link, it runs on a single 20-kilometre line between Helensvale railway station and Broadbeach via Gold Coast University Hospital, Southport and Surfers Paradise. The route forms a public transport spine on the Coast and connects with bus services along the route. A northern extension, from the original terminus at Gold Coast University Hospital to Helensvale railway station, was completed in 2018 before the 2018 Commonwealth Games.

==== Rockhampton ====
Rockhampton operated steam trams from 1909 to 1939. There is a Steam Tram Museum at Archer Park Station, with a toastrack style French Purrey steam tram operating for several hours each Sunday.

==== Nambour ====
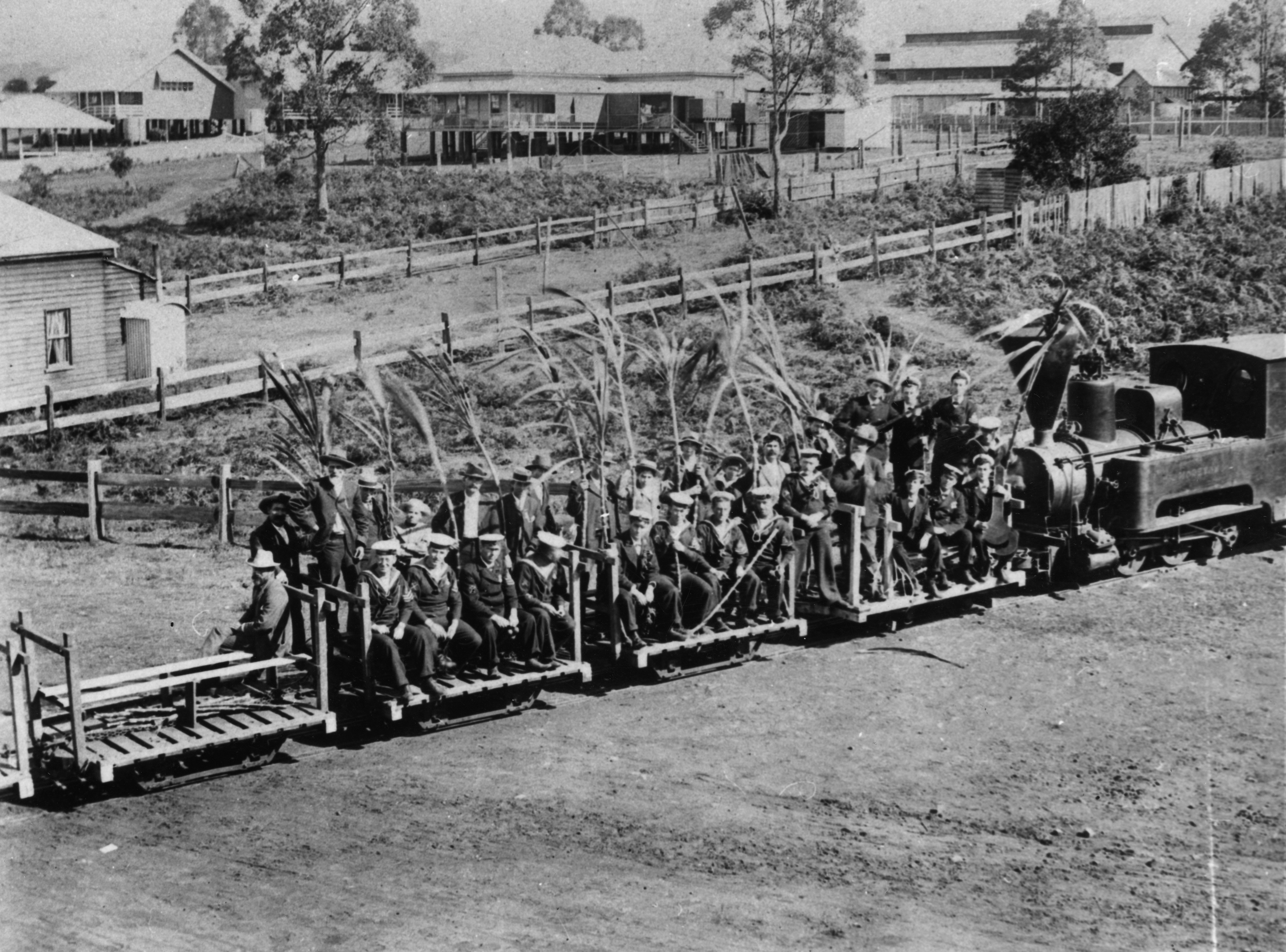
British sailors on board a cane tram at Nambour Queensland, ca. 1910

Nambour re-introduced a tourist tramway in 2021. The tramway is part of the Nambour to Coolum Tramline which was used between the 1910s to 2001. The tourist service includes a diesel locomotive called Petrie donated by Bundaberg Sugar and operates as a passenger service for tourists from the old sugar mill site to Quota Park running 800 metres through the Nambour CBD.

=== South Australia ===
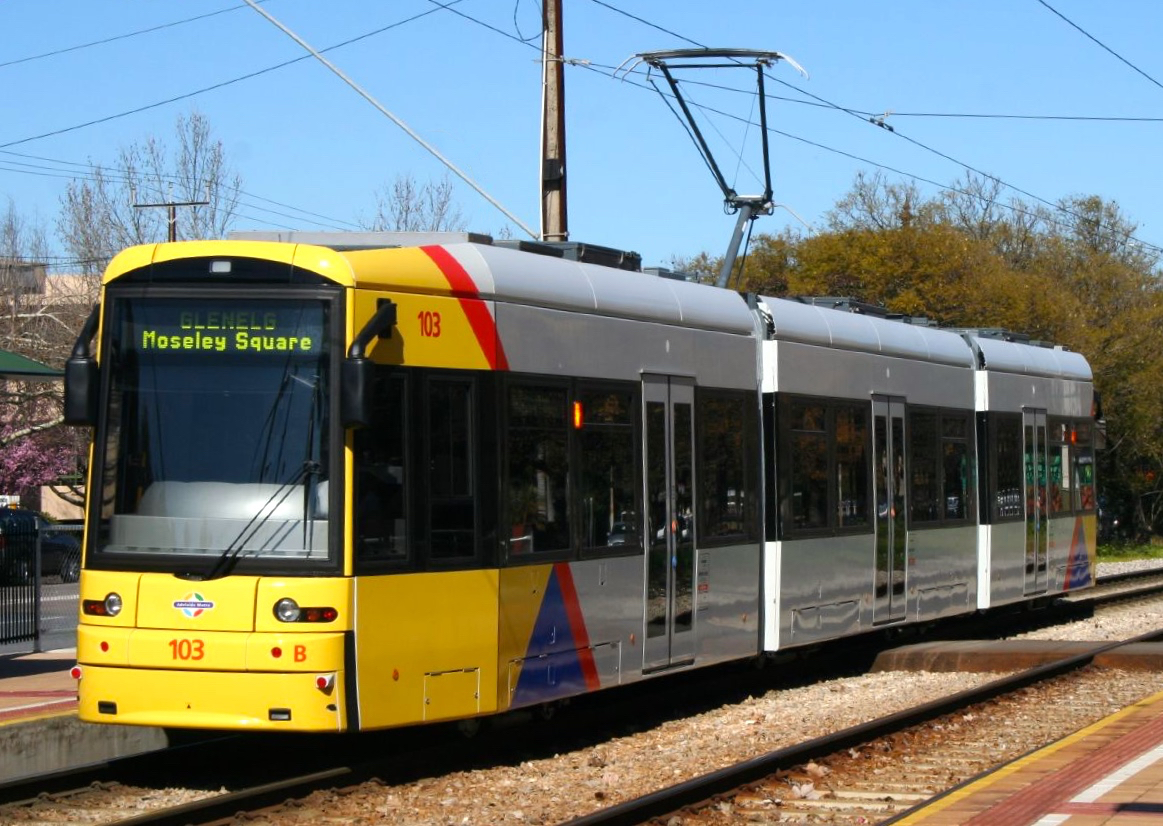
A 100 Series Flexity Classic tram on the 9.2 km (5.7 mi) exclusive use section between Adelaide and Glenelg.

==== Adelaide ====
Adelaide had a horse tram network from 1878 to 1909, followed for half a century by an electrified network of similar length – about 100 km (60 mi). During this period trams and trolleybuses were Adelaide's main public transport, although buses increasingly took on the transport in the early 1950s. In 1958 the street network was closed and the city relied on buses and trains for public transport. An exception was the tram line retained between Victoria Square at the centre of Adelaide and the beachside suburb of Glenelg. Of its then 10.9 km (6.8 mi) length, 9.2 km (5.7 mi) was, and remains, an exclusive-use reservation.

As of 2018, Adelaide's tramways totalled 16.2 km (10.1 mi) in length, following three northwards extensions from Victoria Square. The first, in 2007, was to North Terrace (the northernmost thoroughfare of the Adelaide city centre) then west to near Adelaide railway station. In 2010 that line was further extended north-west to the Adelaide Entertainment Centre in the inner suburb of Hindmarsh. In 2018 the North Terrace line was extended eastwards to serve the educational and cultural precinct. Included with this work was a 300-metre stub north of North Terrace to serve the Adelaide Festival Centre and Adelaide Oval on weekends and for special events.

In 2016 the state government announced an ambitious (but unfunded) tramways plan to serve some of Adelaide's suburbs. However, the manifesto of a new government elected in March 2018 stated that its focus would be on extending tram services in the city centre and North Adelaide rather than building lines further out.

A total of 24 trams built by two European manufacturers now provide services on Adelaide's tramways. Fifteen are Flexity Classic models, classified by Adelaide Metro as the 100 Series, of which eleven were introduced in 2006 and four in 2008; nine are Alstom Citadis 302 models, classified as the 200 Series, of which six were introduced in 2009 and three in 2017. The 1929-vintage Type H trams, phased out of regular service in 2006, last ran in 2015. As of 2023, seven were held by the Tramway Museum, St Kilda, South Australia, and about a dozen more were in private or museum group hands.

==== Victor Harbor ====
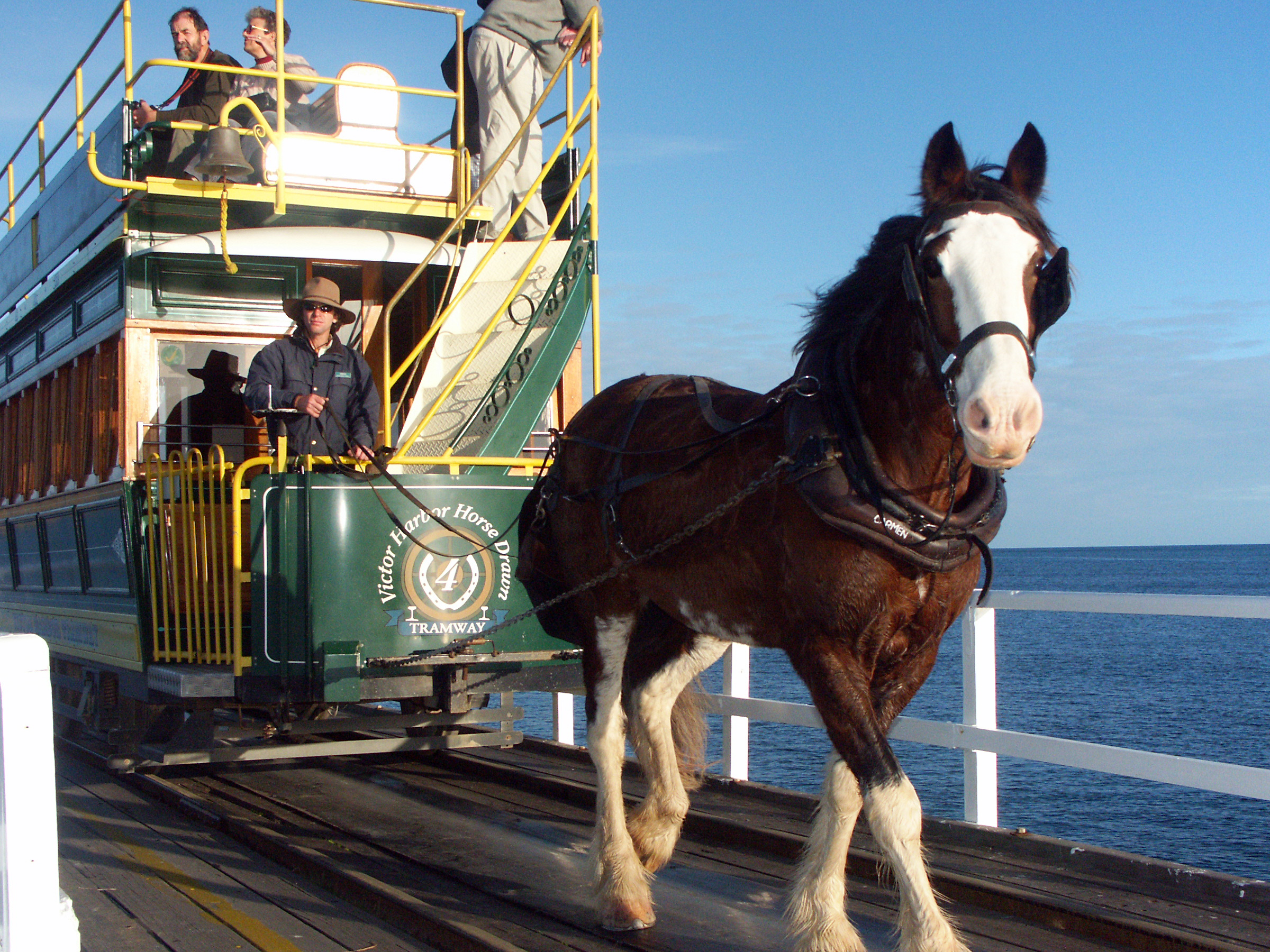
The Victor Harbor Horse Drawn Tram on the causeway to Granite Island

An 1864-built pier off Victor Harbor was modified in 1875 to extend to Granite Island and its wharf, which could accommodate deep draught sailing vessels. The link became known as "The Causeway", along which a railway line was built to convey goods wagons 1 mile 75 chains (1.9 mi, 3.1 km) to the mainland. Horses were the motive power, as they were on about 35 mi (56 km) of lines from Victor Harbor to Strathalbyn at the time. Steam locomotives took over these lines in 1885 but horses continued to operate to Granite Island. In 1894, as increasing numbers of visitors and holiday makers were attracted to the Causeway, the South Australian Railways initiated a passenger service. A double-deck horse tram from Kadina (and previously Moonta) was allocated and later several others joined it.

The service continued until 1955, when the Harbours Board was demolishing the old working jetty and remnants of the Victoria Pier; funds were not allocated for work on the tracks and the Causeway was rebuilt without rails.

Between 1956 and 1986 two rubber-tyred trailers were towed by a small Ferguson tractor, and later by a Land Rover with cladding to imitate the outline of a steam locomotive.

A major project funded for the state's 150th jubilee in 1986 reinstated the horse tramway as the Victor Harbor Horse Drawn Tram. Four sturdy replica carriages were built incorporating tubular steel, timber cladding and roller bearings. Tracks were laid again and a 364-day service commenced on 14 June 1986. The trams and their Clydesdale horses remain very popular. On most days one tram operates an hourly service; two (half-hourly) at busier times and three at Easter and Christmas – New Year holidays.

=== Tasmania ===
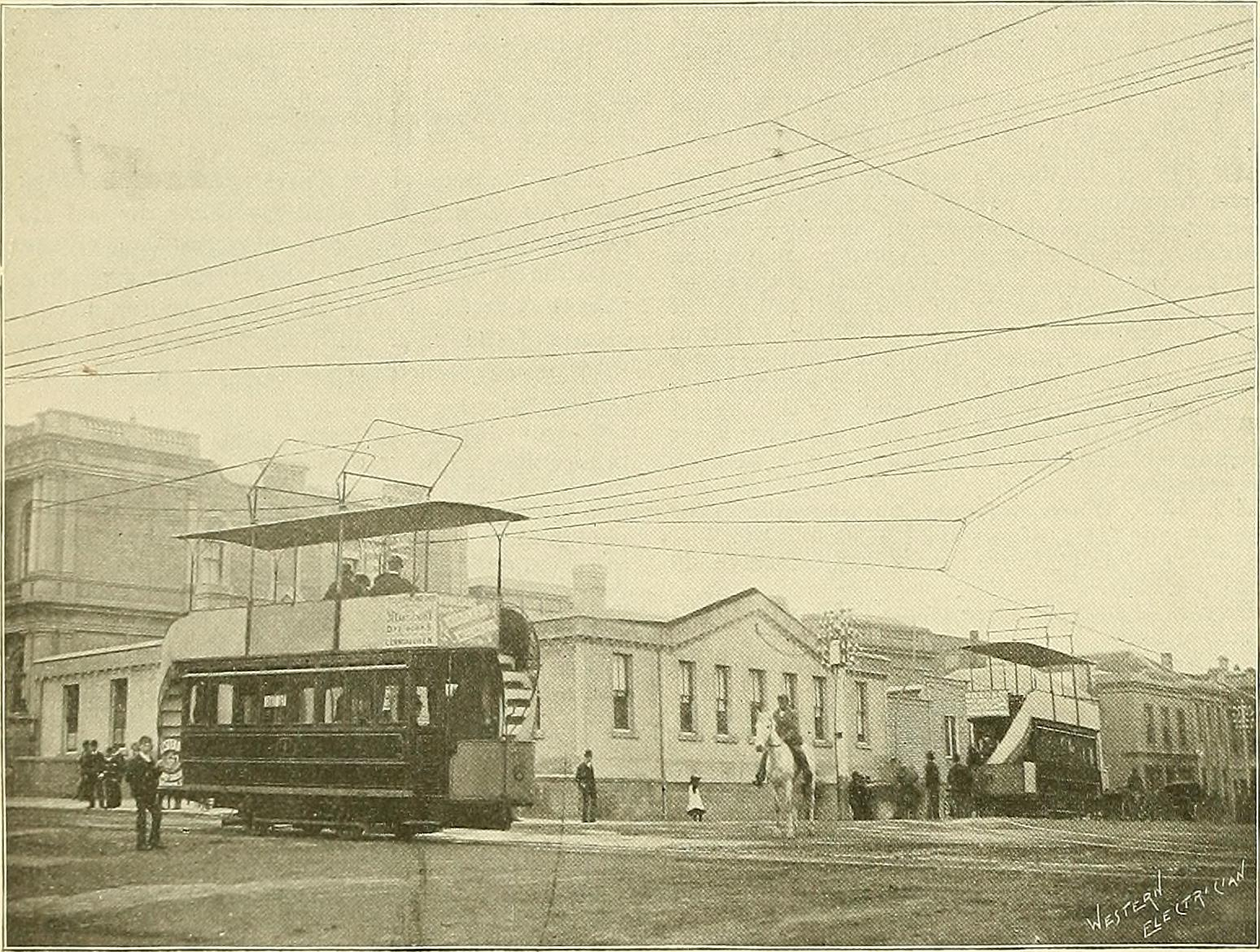
Electric trams in Hobart (c.1895)

==== Hobart ====
Hobart had a municipal tram system from 1893 to 1960 with a network of 8 routes throughout the city, the tram network was scaled down and by 1960 was virtually defunct and replaced by a short lived trolleybus system until 1968. Hobart has investigated restoring the tram network, as it is part of its heritage, being one of the first Australian cities to implement a tram system but no such development has occurred. Recent investigation and transport studies have led to plans to instigate a Light Rail system along the existing South Line.

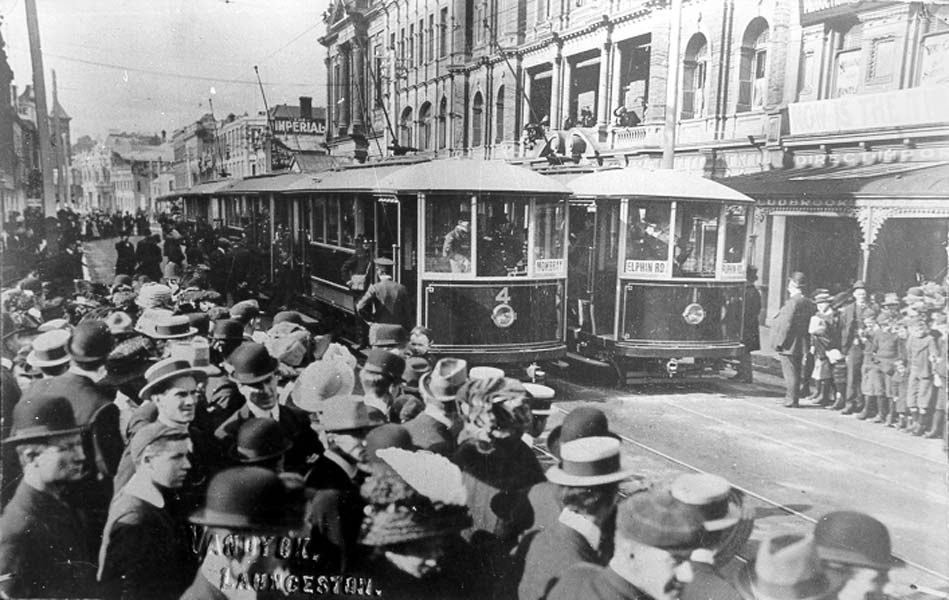
Brisbane Street, Launceston, 1911

==== Launceston ====
Launceston had a municipal tram system from 1911 to 1952 with 29 trams.

The Launceston Tramway Museum Society runs a tramway museum in the Inveresk Precinct. The long-term plan is to have a line from the city centre to the museum and if successful to expand further along the original network.

=== Victoria ===
Locations of Tramways in Victoria

==== Ballarat ====
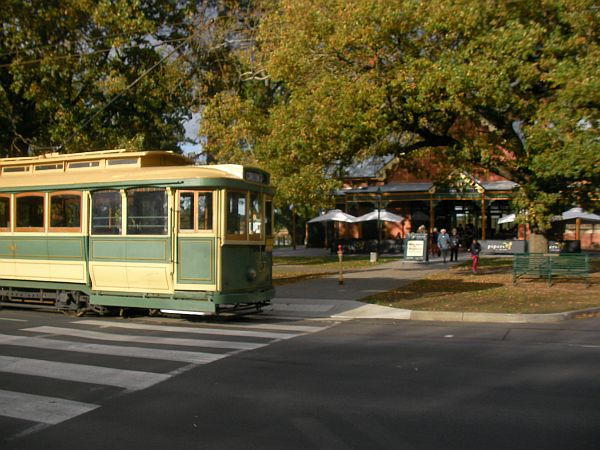
A heritage tram passes the Lake Wendouree Pavilion in Ballarat

Ballarat once operated an extensive tramway network which began in 1887 with horse-drawn trams; this was electrified between 1905 and 1913. The system was closed in September 1971 and replaced by buses. The Ballarat Tramway Museum operates a small section of the original track at Lake Wendouree as a tourist and museum tramway. There have been several proposals put to the City of Ballarat to return trams to the inner suburbs and extend the line to Ballarat railway station however these plans have been put on hold indefinitely.

==== Bendigo ====
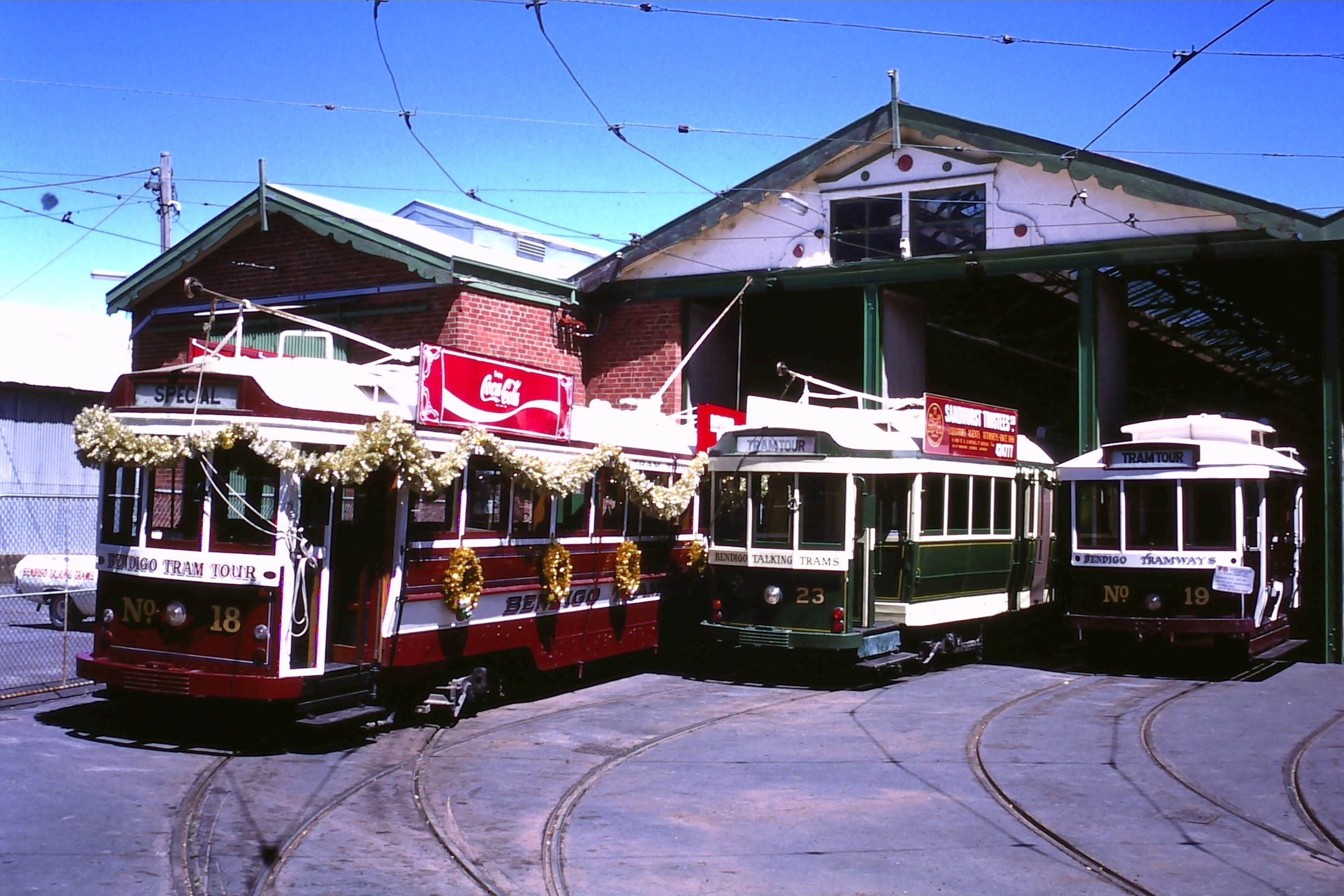
Trams at the Bendigo tram depot, 1987.

Bendigo in regional Victoria electrified its steam-tram service to the neighbouring Borough of Eaglehawk in 1902, and extended this line from Bendigo railway station to Quarry Hill. At the same time, a new line was constructed from Golden Square to Lake Weeroona (later extended to North Bendigo). These two lines passed over each other at Charing Cross, and it is a section of the latter which has been retained for its historic tourist operation. The famous heritage "talking tram" and "cafe tram" are run by the Bendigo Trust in conjunction with a tramway museum at the original electric tram depot.

A public transport trial of trams began in 2009 and in 2010 full funding was committed to restore the Bendigo network for public transport with the development of a raised platform tram stop and yearly ticket costing just A$30 with future extensions to the network in the planning stages.

==== Geelong ====
Geelong maintained an electric tram service from 1912 until 1956; unusually, it was constructed from new – not converted from an existing non-electric system.

The network consisted of 4 main through-routes, all passing through the city:

- North Geelong – Belmont
- Newtown – Eastern Park
- West Geelong – East Geelong
- Chilwell – Eastern Beach

==== Melbourne ====
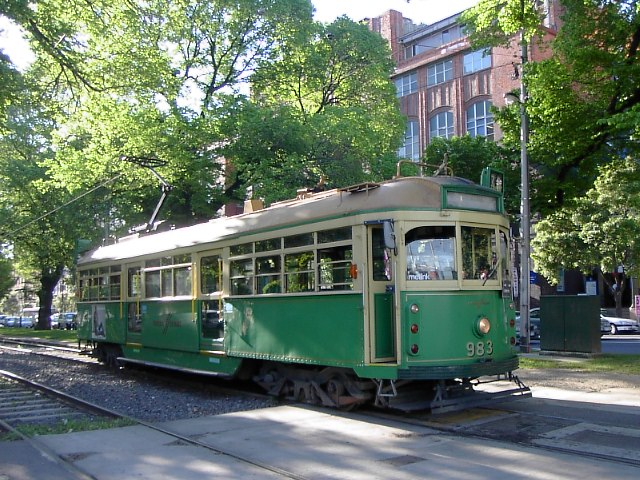
A heritage W-class Melbourne tram

Melbourne, the most populous city in and capital of Victoria, is home to the largest tram network in the world, and its trams have become part of the city's culture and identity due to their long history. Currently around 500 trams are in service in the city.

The system uses a combination of newer low-floor trams (the E-class, C-class (Citadis) and D-class (Combino)), middle-aged, high-floor trams (the A-class, B-class and Z-class) and the older W-class trams. The latter remain in service as a popular tourist attraction, used on the free City Circle Tram route in the city centre, along with operating the world's first restaurant tram. The oldest in-service W-class tram dates from 1939.

==== Portland ====
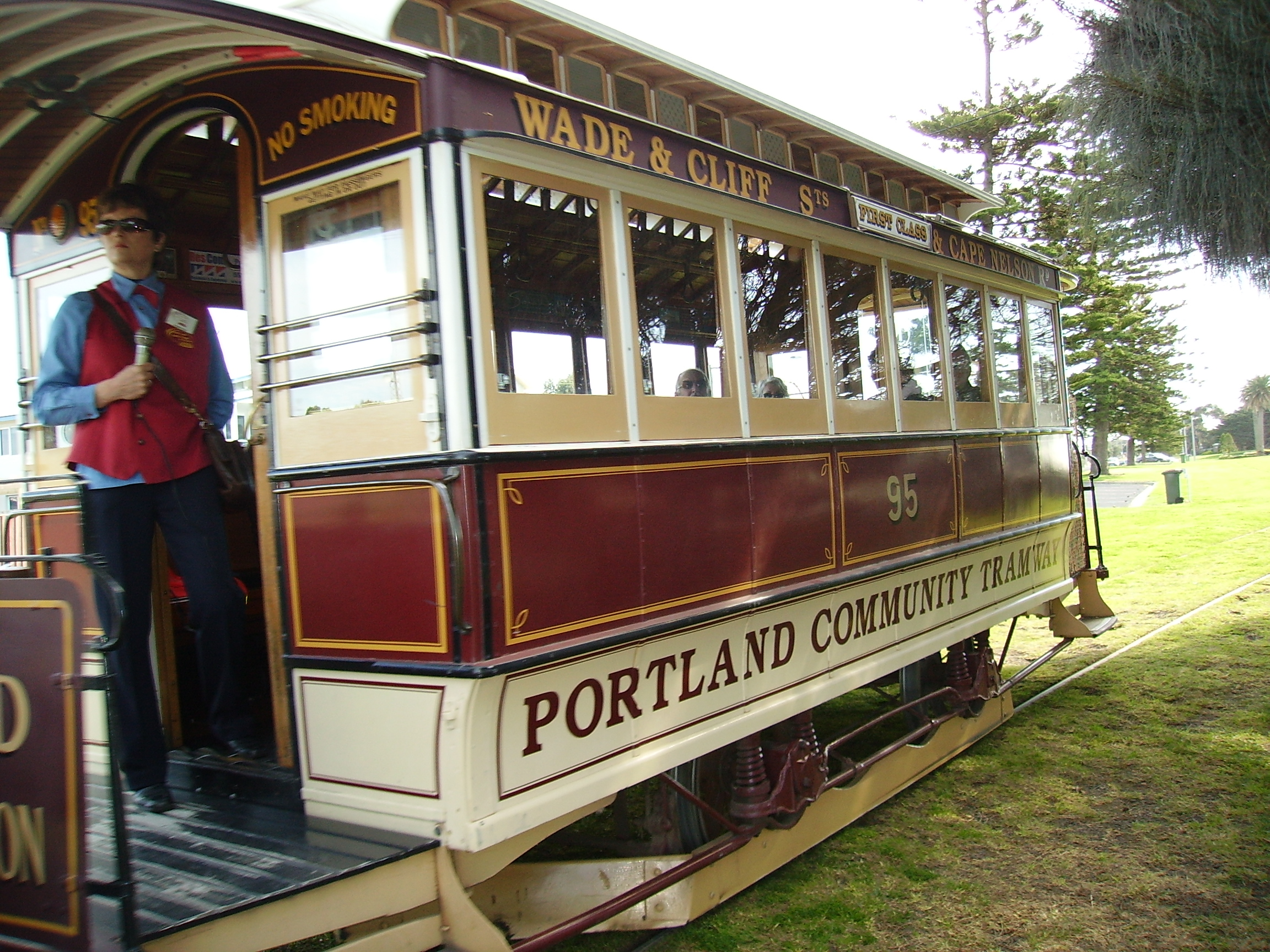
Tram in Portland, powered by a small combustion engine, en route from Wade Street to the Henty Park depot.

A replica tourist route in Portland was created using old vintage Melbourne cable trams. The single line route runs along the beach and harbourfront to the historic lighthouse on the hill. The popular tourist route ran into financial trouble in 2005.

==== Sorrento ====
A steam tram operated in Sorrento between 1889 and 1921 from near the Front Beach pier to the Back Beach. It connected with steamers from Melbourne and Queenscliff providing a tourist and, to a lesser extent, local service across the peninsula. At busy times the steam engines hauled a train of several open-sided cross-bench trailers; during slack periods, a single small horse-drawn tramcar sufficed.

=== Western Australia ===
Tram lines and companies operated in several towns of Western Australia. These were sometimes public services, while others were primarily for industries like mining or timber. Trams operated in the cities and towns of Perth, Fremantle, Kalgoorlie and Leonora. The early northern port of Cossack was linked by tram with the town of Roebourne during the gold boom of the 1890s. The biggest of these networks was centred upon the growing state capital, Perth.

==== Fremantle ====
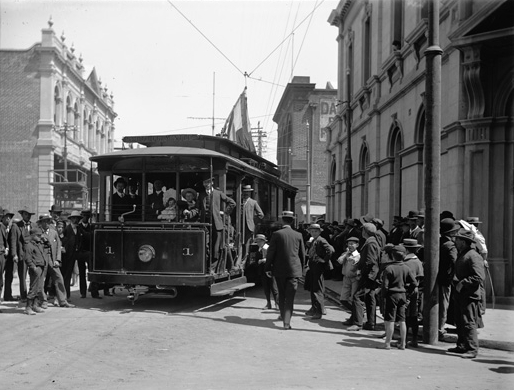
A Fremantle tram in 1905

Between 1905 and 1952, Fremantle had a small but comprehensive tramway network of its own. The Fremantle network was owned and operated by a consortium of local municipalities, and was never linked into the Perth network. Throughout its existence, the Fremantle network covered both the Fremantle municipality and the adjacent municipality of East Fremantle. Its tram lines also extended for part of that period into North Fremantle and Melville.

The Perth Electric Tramway Society commissioned former Fremantle tram #29 in 1992 at Whiteman Park, and it has provided continuous service on (usually) the 4th Sunday of each month.

==== Kalgoorlie ====
Between 1902 and 1952, Kalgoorlie operated a 24 kilometre network.

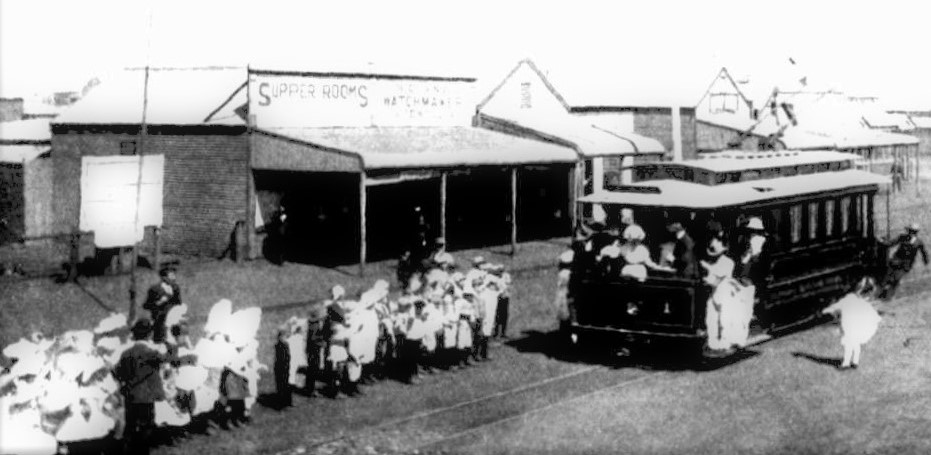
Opening of electrified tramway at Leonora in 1908.

==== Leonora ====
Leonora, a gold-mining town to the north of Kalgoorlie, had a tramway. It opened in 1901, as a steam-operated system, was extended to the nearby town of Gwalia in 1903, and was electrified in 1908. Its length was approximately 4 kilometres, built to 3 ft 6in. gauge and with two overhead trolley wires. After a fire at its power station, it operated using a petrol-powered tram, from 1915 until its final closure in 1921.

==== Perth ====
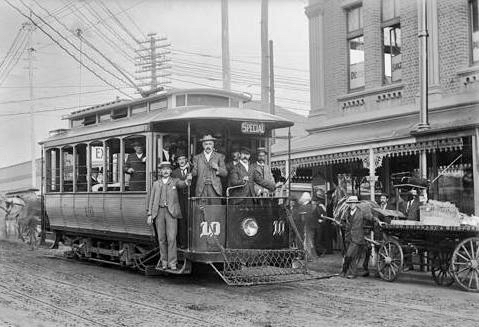
A Perth tram in 1902

Trams ran in Perth from the late nineteenth century. There is believed to have been at least one horse car line, but it probably did not carry passengers. The first electric trams ran in 1899 between East Perth and West Perth along Hay Street. The electric tram network expanded as far west as Claremont, as far north as Osborne Park, and across the Swan River causeway to Victoria Park, Como and Welshpool. The government took over the running of trams in 1914. The last tram was built in 1934; No 130. The trams ceased running on 19 July 1958.

Since the start of 2007, there have been four proposals for the reintroduction of trams to the Perth metropolitan area, in the form of light rail. A line running from Mirrabooka to the Perth central business district (provisionally known as the Metro Area Express) was officially announced in September 2012 but was cancelled in 2016.

At Whiteman Park 22 km north of Perth, there is an operating heritage tram system run by the Perth Electric Tramway Society, with 4 km of track. The trams operating on this system includes former Perth tram #66, commissioned on 9 October 2011. Currently, proposals for the restoration of subsequent Perth trams are being prepared for submission to the membership of the Society.

=== Proposals ===
==== Hobart ====
There is currently a detailed analysis and study into proposals of the introduction of a light rail service in Hobart's northern suburbs along with political backing from all 3 major parties.

== Tramway museums ==
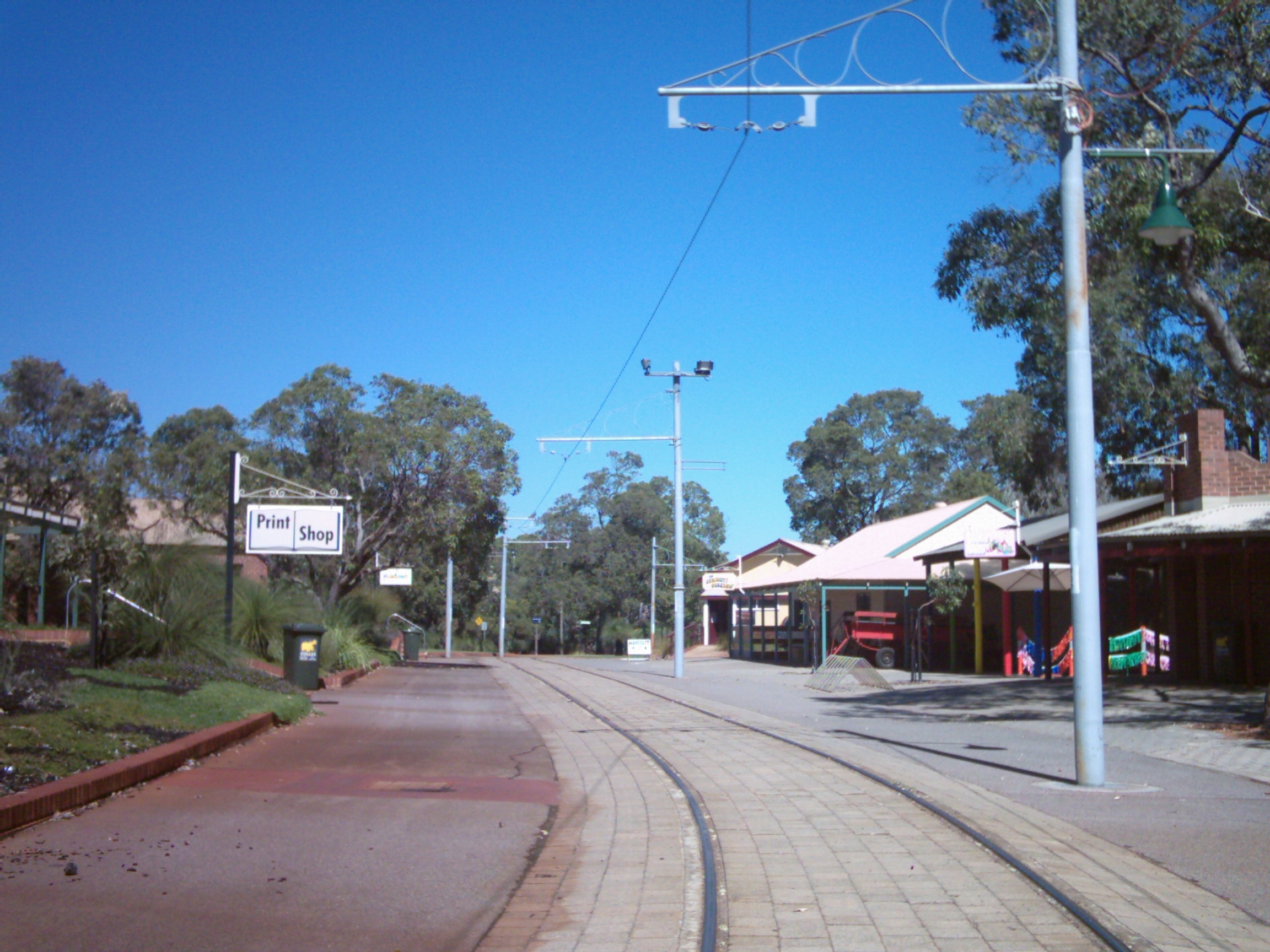
Tramway at Whiteman Park Village, Perth

Tram museums operate in many cities following the closure of their networks. Major museums include the Brisbane Tramway Museum, the Sydney Tramway Museum, Valley Heights Steam Tramway, Whiteman Park, Perth, the Melbourne Tramway Museum, Victoria run by the Tramway Museum Society of Victoria, the Ballarat Tramway Museum and the Bendigo Tramways Museum and Depot, the oldest working tramway depot in Australia. There are also museums at St Kilda and Victor Harbor, South Australia and Launceston, Tasmania.

=== St Kilda ===
The Tramway Museum, St Kilda operates an extensive fleet of historic South Australian and interstate tram cars and trolley buses. Work began in 1958 with the arrival of donated vehicles, the first of which was an old trolley bus from the Municipal Tramways Trust, and the museum was opened in 1967 as a static display. The museum houses more than 30 electric trams, horse trams and electric trolley buses, many of which are restored and operational. Visitors can ride the electric trams along 2 km of purpose built track that runs between the museum and an adventure playground.

== Australian tramcar manufacturers ==
Unless stated otherwise, all cars built for Melbourne were built for the MMTB or its successor authorities/companies.

- ABB/Adtranz, Dandenong
  - Sydney – 2101 class (Variotrams). ABB signed the contract, but the merger with Daimler-Benz to form Adtranz happened during delivery.
- Austral Otis
  - Melbourne – Rail grinder.
- Ansair
  - Melbourne – W7 (13 frames)
- Benjamin Carne
  - Sydney – C1 (steam trailer), B (formerly C2) (steam trailer), Cable grip car (North Sydney), Cable trailer car (North Sydney)
- Bolton
  - Fremantle – Nos 20–25, 30–32
  - Perth
- Bombardier Transportation
  - E-class trams for Melbourne at Dandenong
- Clyde Engineering
  - Melbourne VR trailers (converted from Sydney tramcars)
  - Sydney
- Comeng/ABB
  - Melbourne – Z, A, B
- Duncan & Fraser
  - Adelaide – A, A1 (built as B class), A2 (built as B class), B, C
  - Ballarat – single-truck open-combination trams (Note: converted from other classes), single-truck open cross-bench trams, single-truck closed cross-bench trams
  - Bendigo – single-truck open-combination trams, single-truck open-combination trams, single-truck open cross-bench trams
  - Geelong – single-truck open-combination trams, single-truck open cross-bench trailers
  - Melbourne – horse car (for various operators), A (for PMTT), C (for PMTT), D (for PMTT – built as E class), E (for PMTT), F (for PMTT), G (for PMTT), H (for PMTT), M (for HTT), N (for HTT), O (for PMTT), P (for HTT), S (for MBCTT), S1 (for MBCTT/MMTB), T (for MBCTT), U (assembled for NMETL – built by Brill), V (assembled for NMETL – built by Brill), Trailers (for NMETL)
- Eveleigh Railway Workshops
  - Sydney – Horse Cars (1861–1866 Pitt St Line)
- Fremantle Municipal Tramways
  - Fremantle – Nos 4, 11, 23 (rebuilds); 33–36
- Henry Vale
  - Sydney – A (steam motor), B (formerly C2) (steam trailer)
- Holdens
  - Melbourne – W (for MMTB)
- Hudson Brothers, Sydney
  - Sydney – Horse Cars (Railway to Hunter St line emergency working), A1 (steam trailer), A2 (steam trailer), A3 (steam trailer), A4 (steam trailer), B1 (steam trailer), C1 (steam trailer), B (formerly C2) (steam trailer), Cable grip car (North Sydney), Cable grip car (King Street), Cable trailer car (North Sydney), Cable trailer car (King Street), Combination car (experimental California car)
- James Moore
  - Melbourne – B (for PMTT), K (for PMTT/MMTB), L (for PMTT), R (for FNPTT), W (for MMTB), W2 (for MMTB)
- James Morrison
  - Sydney – B (formerly C2) (steam trailer), Cable trailer car (North Sydney)
- Meadowbank Manufacturing Company, Sydney
  - Melbourne – J (for PMTT)
  - Sydney
- Melbourne, Brunswick & Coburg Tramways Trust
  - Melbourne – Scrubber, S (assembly & fitting-out), T (assembly & fitting-out), S1 (assembly & fitting-out)
- Melbourne & Metropolitan Tramways Board
  - Melbourne – CW5, L (assembly & fitting-out), PCC (980, 1041), Q, R (assembly & fitting-out), S1 (assembly & fitting-out), SW2, SW5 (some), SW6, W (some), W1, W2 (some – some), W3, W4, W5, W6, W7 (some), X1, X2, Y, Y1, Dog Car, Blow-down car, Scrubber, Per-way locomotive and sleeper carrier, Sleeper transport car, Track cleaner (some), Line-marking car, Welding car loco, Flat car trailer, Per way locomotive, Ballast motor, Ballast trailer, Scraper, Rail hardener, Drivers instruction car, Re-railing instruction car, Workshops locomotive, Breakdown car, Freight car, Wheel transport car, Laboratory testing car, Pantograph testing car, Advertising car, Restaurant car, City Circle car, Victorian Railways One-Man bogie car, cable dummy, cable trailer
- Melbourne Tramway & Omnibus Company
  - Melbourne – horse car (for various operators), cable dummy, cable trailer, bogie cable trailer, cable trailer, bogie cable trailer
  - Sorrento – steam-tram trailers
- Mort's Dock & Engineering Company
  - Newcastle – Gas pot car (tank)
- Prahran & Malvern Tramways Trust
  - Melbourne – Track cleaner, D, C (assembly & fitting-out), E (assembly & fitting-out), J (assembly & fitting-out), B (assembly & fitting-out), K (assembly & fitting-out), L (assembly & fitting-out), R (assembly & fitting-out)
- A. Pengelley & Co
  - Adelaide – D, E, E1 (built as E class), F, F1, H,
  - Geelong – single-truck closed-combination trams
  - Melbourne – VR
- Randwick Tramway Workshops
  - Melbourne – Scrubber (for Sydney)
  - Sydney – Horse Cars (for Newtown – St Peters line and (later) Manly), B (formerly C2) (steam trailer), Cable trailer car (King Street), 1894 Accumulator car
- Ritchie Brothers
  - Melbourne – VR (from Sydney)
  - Sydney – A6 (steam trailer), B (formerly C2) (steam trailer), Cable grip car (King Street)
- Robison Brothers
  - Melbourne – P (for HTT) (trucks), M (for HTT) (trucks – not used, transferred to R for FNPTT/MMTB)
- Ruwolt
  - Launceston – (trucks)
  - Melbourne – B (for PMTT) (trucks), K (for PMTT) (trucks), S1 (for MBCTT) (trucks)
- Sewell
  - Melbourne – L (for PMTT) (trucks), M (for FTT) (trucks), Q (for MMTB) (trucks), Q1 (for MMTB) (trucks), R (for FNPTT) (trucks)
- S & E Co
  - Melbourne (Rail grinder) (for Sydney)
  - Sydney – Rail grinder
- Stansfield & Carey
  - Sydney – C1 (steam trailer), Cable grip car (North Sydney)
- Thomas Wearne
  - Sydney – A (steam motor) (Baldwin type), A2 (steam trailer), A5 (steam trailer), A6 (steam trailer), B (steam trailer), C (steam trailer), D1 (self-contained steam car), Cable trailer car (North Sydney)
- Victorian Railways
  - Melbourne – VR first fleet (some), VR second fleet
- Waddingtons/Commonwealth Engineering
  - Sydney
- Western Australian Government Railways
  - Fremantle – Nos 26–29
  - Perth – B
- Westralia Ironworks
  - Fremantle – Nos 15–16
  - Perth

== Overseas manufacturers of Australian trams ==
- Alstom
  - Melbourne – C1 (Citadis 202)
  - Melbourne – C2 (Citadis 302) Short term lease from Mulhouse, France, subsequently purchased by the Victorian government.
  - Alstom Citadis 302 2nd hand from Madrid, Spain
  - Alstom Citadis X05 CBD and South East Light Rail
- Baldwin Locomotive Works
  - Sydney – A (steam motor) (Baldwin type)
  - Sydney – D1 (self-contained steam car) (steam unit)
- Beyer, Peacock
  - Sydney – Experimental (steam motor) (Wilkinson type) ("John Bull")
- Bombardier Transportation
  - Flexity Classic
  - Flexity 2
- Brown, Marshalls & Co
  - Sydney – 1888 Accumulator car (?)
- JG Brill Company
  - Adelaide – G (Birney)
  - Fremantle – Nos 1–14, 17–19
  - Geelong – Birney
  - Launceston – (trucks)
  - Melbourne – A (for PMTT) (trucks), F (for PMTT) (trucks), G (for PMTT) (trucks), H (for PMTT) (trucks), J (for PMTT) (trucks), N (for HTT) (trucks), S (for MBCTT) (trucks), T (for MBCTT) (trucks),
    U (for NMETL – assembled by Duncan & Fraser), V (for NMETL – assembled by Duncan & Fraser), X (Birney), Trailer (trucks), various works cars (trucks), VR (trucks)
  - Sydney – D1 (self-contained steam car) (cars)
- Brush Traction
  - Adelaide – (trucks)
  - Geelong – (trucks)
  - Launceston – (trucks)
  - Melbourne – C (for PMTT) (trucks), D (for PMTT) (trucks), E (for PMTT) (trucks), O (for PMTT) (trucks), VR original fleet (trucks)
- Construcciones y Auxiliar de Ferrocarriles
  - Manufactured trams for: Sydney – Urbos 2 (second hand trams that were leased for a brief period), Urbos 3
  - Manufactured for: Newcastle – Urbos 3
  - Manufactured for: Canberra – Urbos 3
- Duewag
  - A1 (trucks), A2 (trucks), B1 (trucks), B2 (trucks), Z3 (trucks)
- G Starbuck, Birkenhead, England
  - Sydney – Horse Cars (1861–1866 Pitt St Line)
- Gilbert & Bush Co for JG Brill
  - Sydney – A (steam trailer)
- J M Jones Manufacturing Co (New York)
  - Sydney – Cable trailer car (North Sydney)
- John Stephenson Co (New York)
  - Melbourne – horse car (for various operators), cable trailer (for MTOC)
  - Sydney – experimental electric car (North Sydney)
- John Stephenson Co (New York) for JG Brill
  - Melbourne – U (for NMETL – assembled by Duncan & Fraser), V (for NMETL – assembled by Duncan & Fraser)
- Kitson & Co
  - Sydney – A (steam motor) (Kitson type)
  - Sydney – D (self-contained steam car)
- Merryweather & Sons
  - Sydney – A (steam motor) (Merryweather type)
- St Louis Car Company
  - Melbourne – PCC (trucks), W2 (trucks), X (Birney)
  - Sydney – 1894 accumulator car (trucks) (?)
- Siemens
  - Melbourne – D (2nd) (Combino)

== Unknown manufacturers ==
  - Sydney D2 (self-contained steam car) ("Ambrose cars")

== See also ==
- List of town tramway systems in Oceania
- Trams in New Zealand
- Transport in Australia
