= Trams in Bendigo =

Australian tram system

Bendigo tramway network
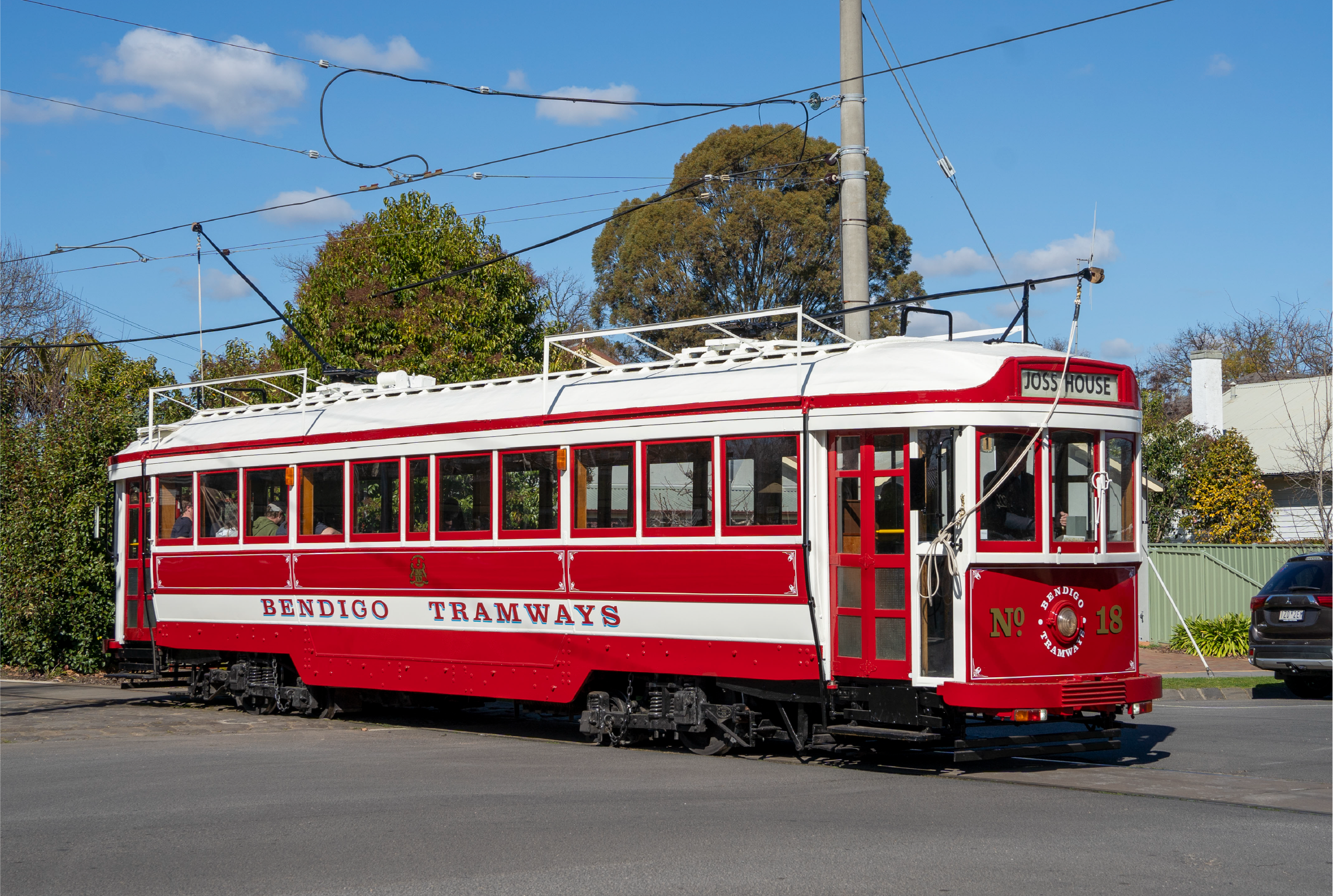
- Bendigo Tramways No. 18 in August 2024

Operation
- Locale: Bendigo, Victoria, Australia

Statistics
Steam tram era: 1892–1902
- Operator: Bendigo Tramways Company Limited
- Track gauge: 1,435 mm (4 ft 8 1/2 in)
- Propulsion system: Steam
Electric tram era: since 1903
- Operators: Electric Supply Company of Victoria (1903–1934); State Electricity Commission of Victoria (SECV) (1934–1972); Bendigo Tramways (since 1972)
- Track gauge: 1,435 mm (4 ft 8 1/2 in)
- Propulsion system: Electricity
- Website: http://www.bendigotramways.com Bendigo Tramways

Trams in Bendigo have operated since 1890. They ceased to operate as a means of public transport in 1972 but part of the main network continues to operate today as a tourist attraction. Limited trials have also been made in 2009 with operating commuter service, but with minimal usage by the public.

== History ==
=== As public transport ===
The first trams in Bendigo were battery operated, but only lasted three months before being withdrawn due to their unreliability. A steam tram system commenced operation in 1892 operated by the Bendigo Tramways Company Limited, and lasted until 1902. Electric trams commenced in 1903 operated by the Electric Supply Company of Victoria, the network eventually covering two routes, one north–south from North Bendigo through the city centre to Golden Square, and Eaglehawk through the city centre to Quarry Hill.

The Electric Supply Company of Victoria was taken over by the State Electricity Commission of Victoria (SECV) in 1934, as part of the centralisation of the supply of electricity in Victoria. The SECV was in the power generation business, and did not want to operate the loss-making provincial tramways of Bendigo, Ballarat and Geelong, but was forced to by the State Government.

In 1957–58 tram passengers were paying an average fare of 3 cents while the service cost 8.75 cents to provide, and by 1961–62 the cost was 10 cents. Between 1961 and 1969 patronage fell 46 percent, but in 1968, the Legislative Council refused to give the SECV permission to abandon the service. It continued to be operated by the SECV until April 1972, when the Bendigo tramways were closed.

=== As a tourist tramway ===
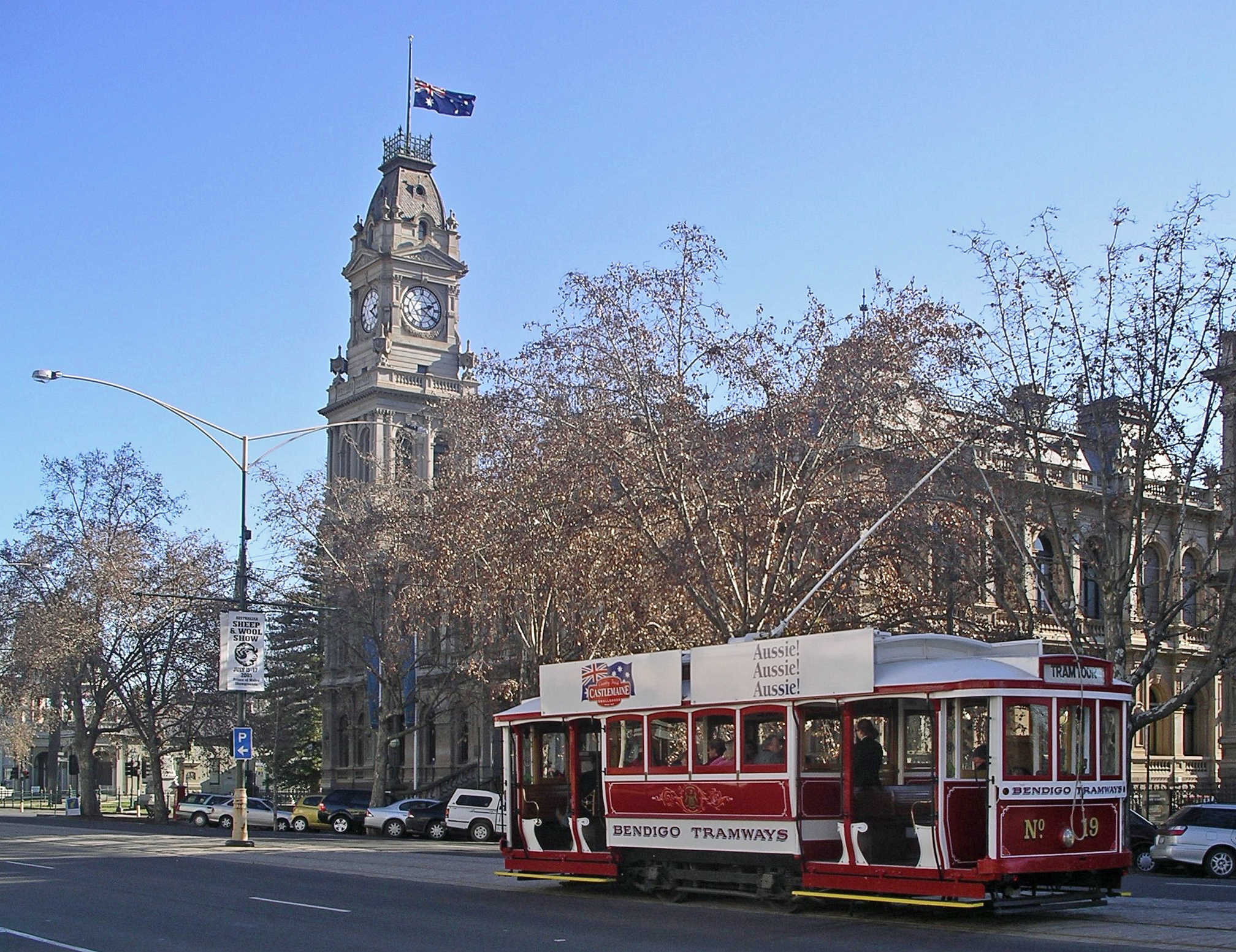
Tourist tram in Bendigo's main street in 2015

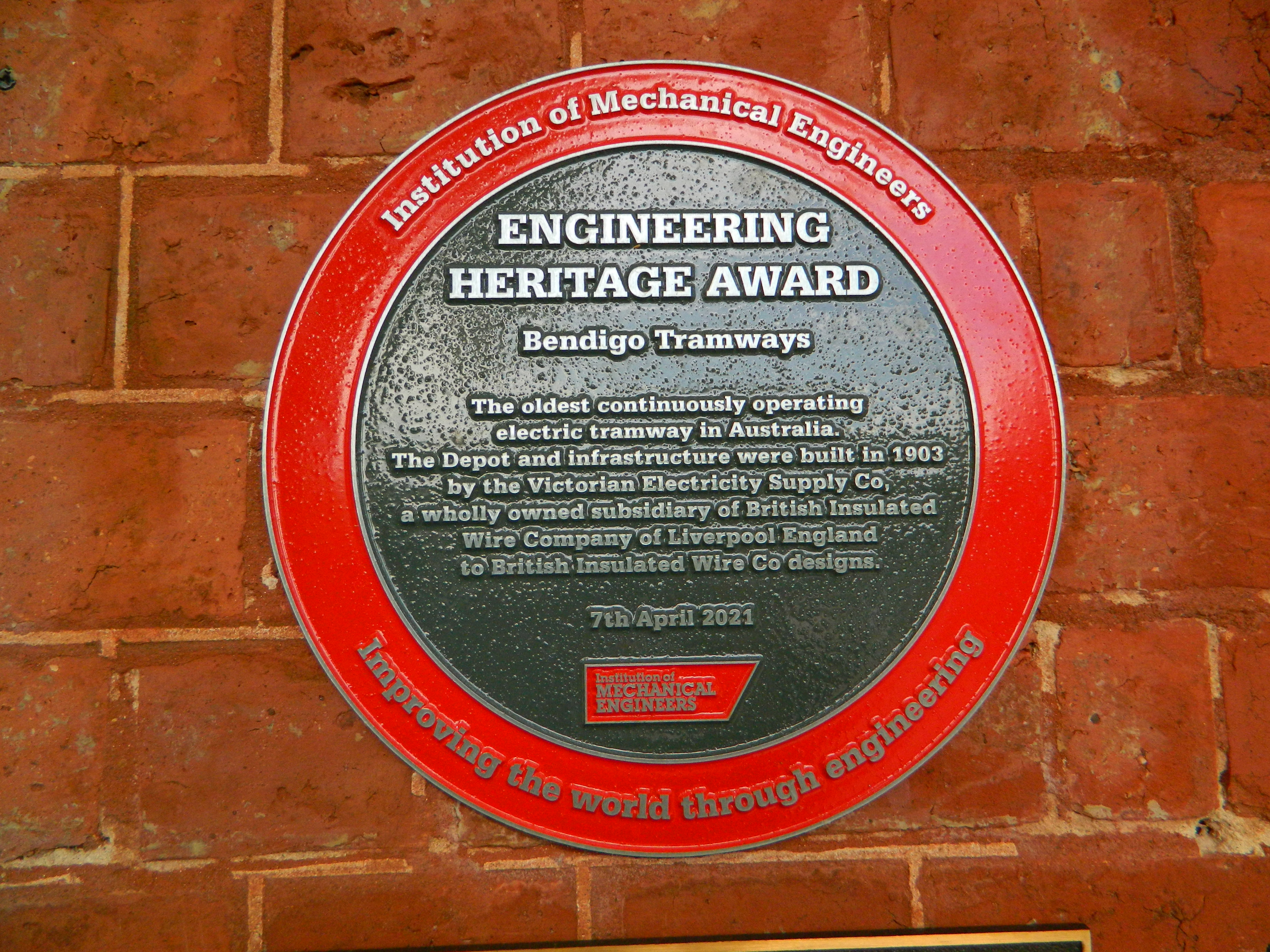
Memorial tablet on the Wall the Bendigo's tram depot

In September 1972 a two-year trial of tourist tramways commenced by "The Bendigo Trust" trading as "Bendigo Tramways", and they remain in operation today. The service operates from North Bendigo though the city centre to the Central Deborah Gold Mine.

Between 1996 and 1998, a tourist restaurant and cafe trams was introduced to Bendigo, following the success of a similar model of the Colonial Tramcar Restaurant in Melbourne. The idea proved very popular and the Bendigo fleet has since increased in size.

In 2005 a proposal was put forward to the City of Greater Bendigo to extend the tourist tram route around Lake Weeroona, however the plan met staunch opposition from the community and it was ultimately rejected putting the viability of the network at risk.

In 2008, notable environmental scientist Peter Newman called for modernisation of the Bendigo tram network to operate as a form of public transport.

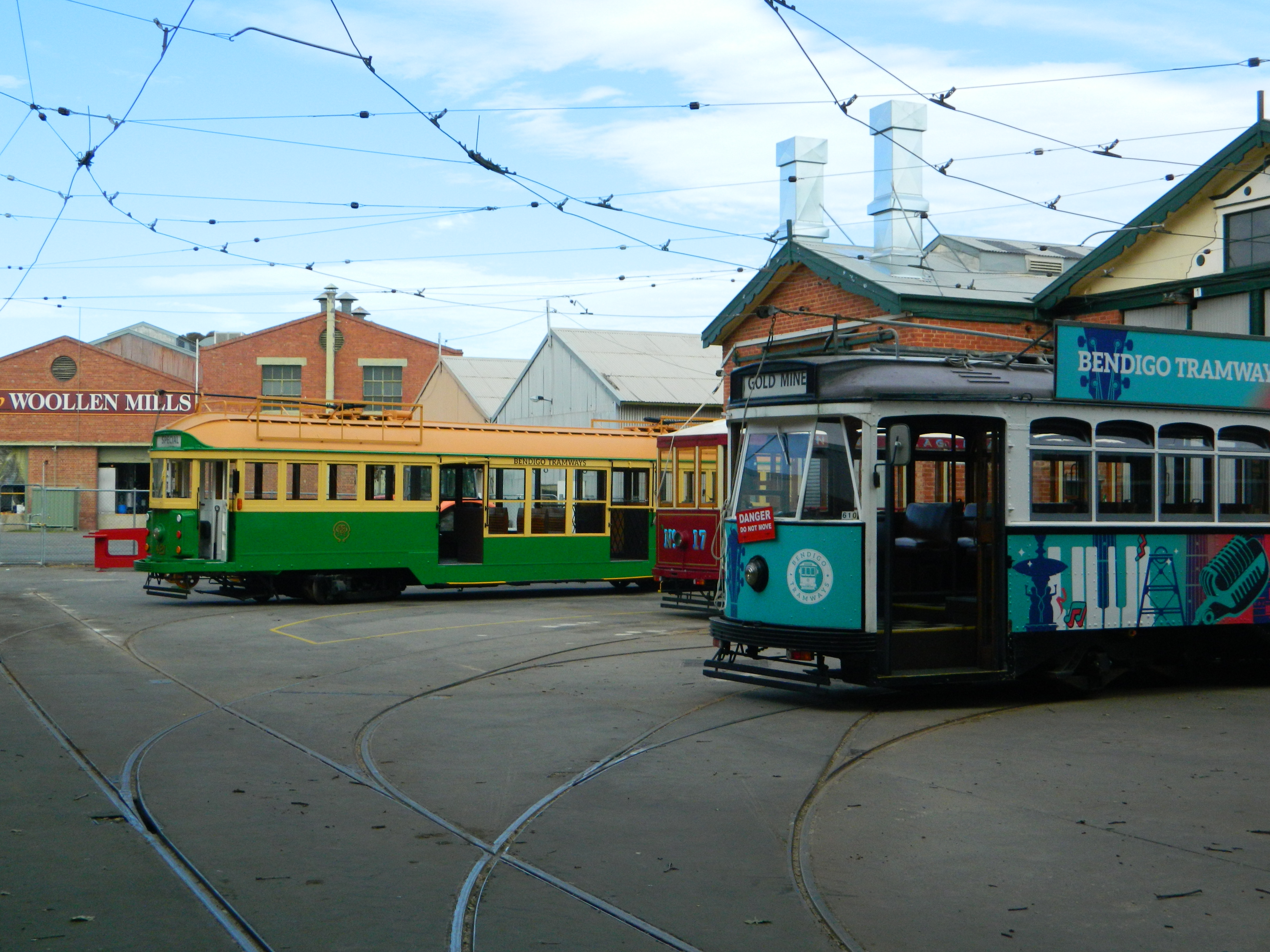
Bendigo's tram depot

After calls from the community organisations and representatives, a week-long trial of commuter tram services began in December 2008, followed by a second trial between 16 March and 9 April 2009, with trams running every 20 minutes between North Bendigo, Golden Square and the CBD during the morning and afternoon peaks. Fares were set at A$2 a ride. The trials attracted good publicity and support from the Bendigo +25 Transport Action Group, but resulted in light patronage. The Bendigo Tramways concluded that the trial "showed that Bendigonians are still more comfortable using their cars", but should the need arise to reintroduce the trams as a commuter service, "we are certainly up to the task".

In February 2010 the Bendigo Tramways received $3.1 million to fund the redevelopment of the depot, workshop and administration building, as well as landscaping and heritage conservation, and safety works. This would mean a doubling in the capacity of the workshop, which also restores parts for heritage trams around the world.

== Current service ==
=== Stops ===
Name	Location	Time (northbound)	Time (southbound)
Gold Mine	Central Deborah Gold Mine	0	31
Charing Cross	Bendigo CBD	7	12
Tram Depot	Tramways Avenue, Bendigo	18	—
Lake Weerona	Adjacent Lake Weeroona	22	5
Tysons Reef	Weerona Avenue, Bendigo	24	3
Joss House	Near Bendigo Joss House Temple, North Bendigo	29	0

== See also ==
- Charing Cross tram stop
- Rail transport in Victoria
- Spider (locomotive) Bendigo Tramways locomotive moved to Tasmania
- Transportation in Australia
- Tram controls
- Trams in Australia
