= Metropolitan Area Express =

Metropolitan Area Express (usually abbreviated MAX) may refer to:

- MAX Light Rail, a light rail system in Portland, Oregon
- Metropolitan Area Express (Las Vegas), a defunct bus rapid transit line in Las Vegas, Nevada
- Metro Area Express, a bus rapid transit line in Kansas City, Missouri
- Metro Area Express (Perth), a cancelled light rail system in Perth, Western Australia
