= F-class tram =

F-class tram may refer to:

- F-class Melbourne tram, built 1912
- F-class Sydney tram, built 1899-1902

== See also ==
- F type Adelaide tram
