= Central Deborah Gold Mine =

Gold mine in Bendigo, Victoria, Australia

Coordinates: 36.7650°S 144.2702°E

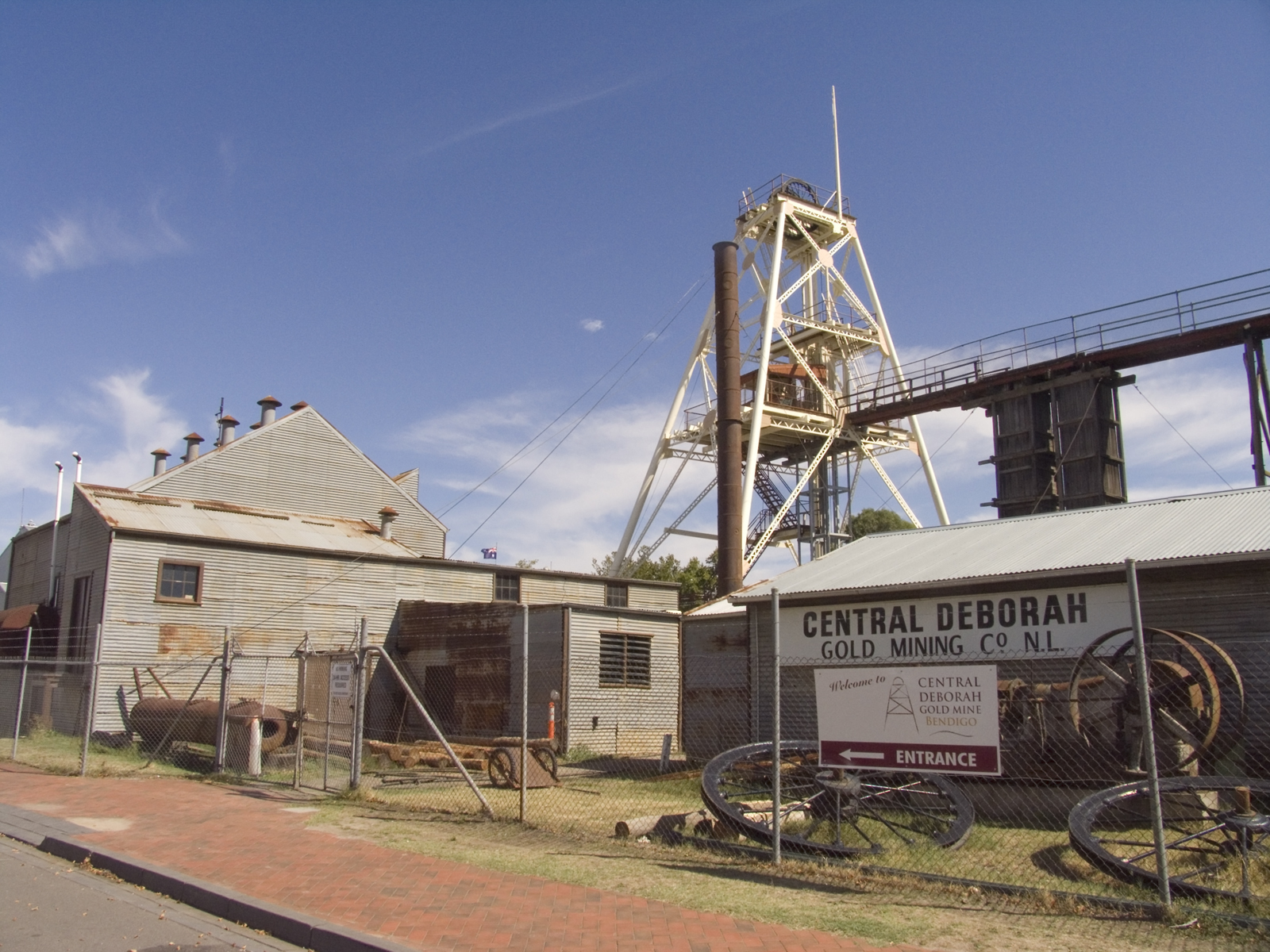

The Central Deborah Gold Mine is a non-active gold mine and tourist attraction in Bendigo, Australia. It was listed on the Victorian Heritage Register on 18 November 1999.

The mine was opened in 1939 by the Central Deborah Gold Mining Company during a 1930s revival of the gold industry, extending an existing 108 ft shaft from many years earlier with new machinery. It was one of the last mines to open on the Bendigo goldfields and one of the few to stay open during World War II. It was expanded during 1945–46, with extensions and new machinery. It reached its maximum depth (now recorded as 412m) during the 1940s. It closed in November 1954, having produced 29,865 ounces of gold in its lifetime; the closure of the North Deborah Mine two weeks later marked the last mine in Bendigo to close.

It was reopened in 1986 as a tourist attraction for underground tours, with its shaft being widened to allow for larger lifts. It was preserved and restored by a local heritage organisation, the Bendigo Trust, which also restored the city's tramways. It still retains its original buildings and much of its fittings and mining machinery.

The Violet Street tram stop of the Bendigo Tramways route connects the mine to Lake Weeroona, the Bendigo Joss House Temple and other local tourist attractions, with the route's western end terminating at the mine.
