= Metro Area Express (Perth) =

Metro Area Express (MAX)
- Concept image of urban centre station

Overview
- Status: Project cancelled
- Locale: Perth, Western Australia
- Website: www.max.wa.gov.au

Service
- Type: Light rail
- Services: 1 + 2 spur lines
- Rolling stock: Articulated trams

Technical
- Line length: 22 km (14 mi)
- Track gauge: 1,435 mm (4 ft 8 1/2 in) standard gauge

Metro Area Express (MAX) was a proposed light rail network for Perth, Western Australia, as part of Colin Barnett's 2010 announcement of a decade of light rail for Perth. It was scheduled to open in 2018, then postponed until 2022, then replaced by concepts for rapid buses and heavy rail, until it was abandoned in 2016.

== Background ==
Perth's original tramway network, which linked the Perth central business district with many of Perth's inner suburbs, was in operation between the end of the nineteenth century and 1958.

Since the start of 2007, there have been four proposals for the reintroduction of trams to the Perth metropolitan area, in the form of light rail. At least two of the proposals have been the subject of a detailed feasibility study.

In September 2012, the Government of Western Australia announced plans for a new Perth network, to be known as Metro Area Express (MAX).

Construction of the first stage was originally scheduled to begin in 2016, and be completed by the end of 2018. However, in December 2013 the government announced the project would be deferred for three years. Under the new timeframe the MAX network was to open in 2022.

In April 2014, incoming transport minister Dean Nalder stated the government would investigate splitting the project into two parts, to allow an earlier start to be made on construction with priority given to the Balga - CBD section.

In March 2015, the government announced it was considering using buses to implement the MAX route rather than light rail. Transport minister Dean Nalder said a preliminary analysis suggested that using buses would cost approximately 50% less than a light rail system. In February 2016 it was proposed by the government that a heavy rail line be built.

In June 2016 the government confirmed that the MAX light rail plan had been cancelled. While still planning a northern transport corridor, Transport Minister Dean Nalder said it would not be implemented using light rail and instead would use other alternatives.

== Route ==
Indicative route map.

The first stage of the MAX network was to run from the Polytechnic West campus in Balga, in Perth's northern suburbs, to the Perth CBD, with spur lines from the CBD to the Queen Elizabeth II Medical Centre in Nedlands and to the eastern end of the Causeway in Victoria Park.

=== Stops ===
Stop	Area
Polytechnic West	Balga
Mirrabooka bus station	Mirrabooka
Cottonwood Crescent	Dianella
Morley Drive North	Dianella
Morley Drive	Dianella
Dianella Plaza	Dianella
Woodrow Avenue	Dianella/Yokine
Terry Tyzak Aquatic Centre	Inglewood
ECU Mt Lawley	Mount Lawley
Woodville	North Perth
North Perth	North Perth
Robertson Park	Northbridge
Aberdeen Street	Northbridge
Perth Arena	Perth CBD
City Square	Perth CBD
Swan River
Causeway	Victoria Park
Queen Elizabeth II Medical Centre	Nedlands

== See also ==
- Trams in Fremantle
- Trams in Australia
