= F type Adelaide tram =

Class of 20th-century tram in Adelaide

F type
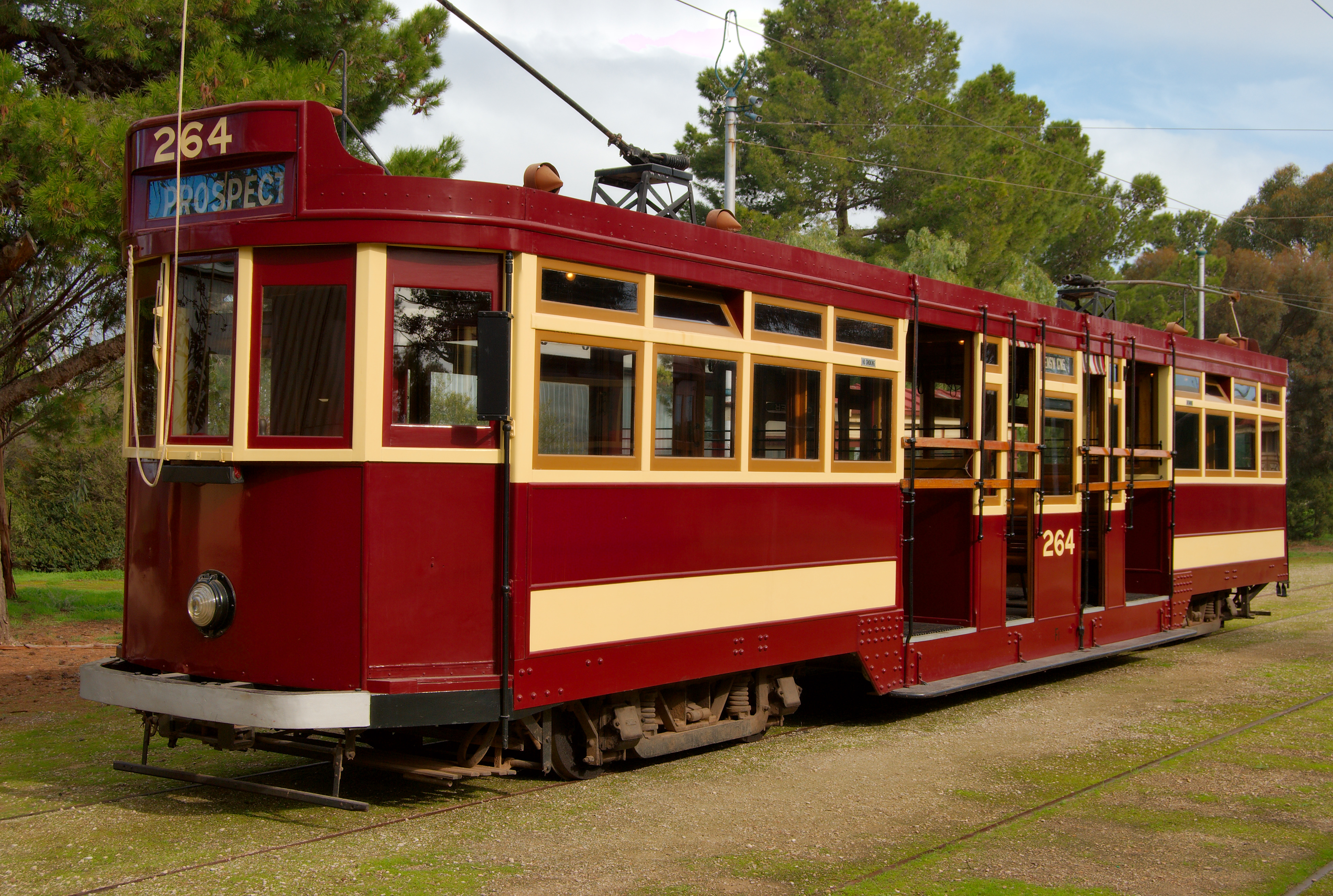
- F264 at the Tramway Museum, St Kilda in November 2008
- Manufacturers: A. Pengelley & Co; Municipal Tramways Trust
- Assembly: Adelaide
- Constructed: 1921-29
- Number built: 84
- Fleet numbers: 201-284
- Capacity: 60

Specifications
- Car length: 14.94 metres
- Width: 2.69 metres
- Height: 3.30 metres
- Weight: 19.64 tons (201-225); 19.70 tons (226-250); 20.01 tons (251-262); 20.10 tons (263-284)
- Traction motors: 4 x 40hp General Electric 247s (201-225); 4 x 50hp Dick, Kerr & Co 84Bs (226-262); 4 x 50hp Dick, Kerr & Co 105Fs (263-284)
- Current collection: Trolley pole
- Bogies: J. G. Brill Company (77E2)
- Track gauge: 1435 mm (4 ft 8 1/2 in)

The F type Adelaide tram was a class of 84 bogie, drop centre, combination trams built between 1921 and 1929 for the Municipal Tramways Trust (MTT). All but three were built by A. Pengelley & Co, Adelaide; 262, 283 and 284 were built by the MTT's Hackney workshops. The first 50 were built as the F type and the last 34 were classified as the F1 type, having an all steel as opposed to partly wooden underframe. Some remained in service until the street network closed in November 1958.

== Preservation ==
Two have been preserved:

- 264 & 282 by the Tramway Museum, St Kilda.
