= Lake Weeroona =

Lake in Bendigo, Victoria, Australia

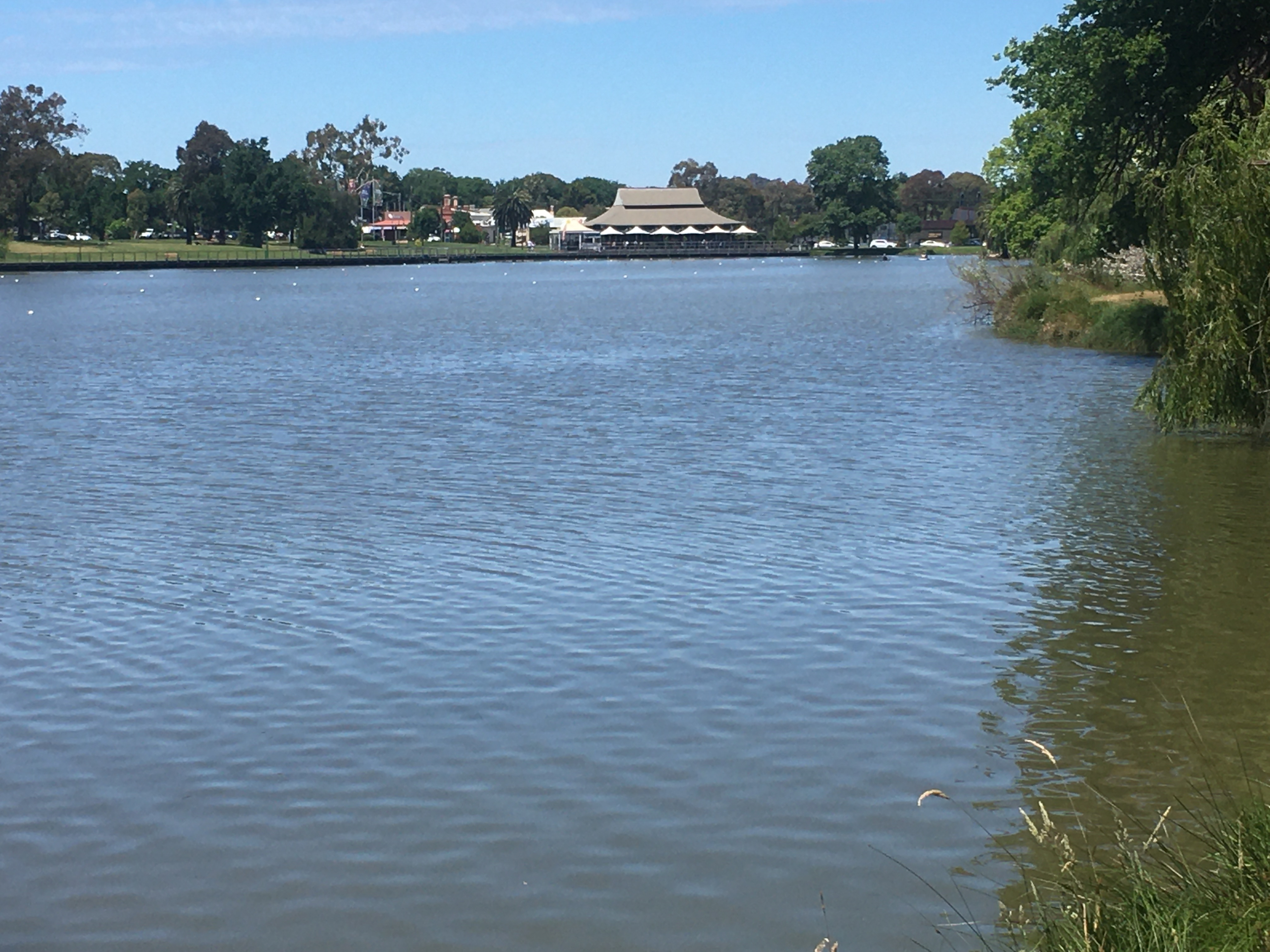
- Lake Weeroona with board walk in background

- Location within Australia
- Location: Bendigo, Victoria, Australia
- Coordinates: 36°44′48″S 144°17′29″E
- Type: Man-made lake

Lake Weeroona is a man-made lake in the city of Bendigo, Victoria.

== History ==
Lake Weeroona was commissioned in 1878 under the supervision of William Guilfoyle, the art director of the Melbourne Botanic Gardens. Originally a mine, the then Mayor of Bendigo Mayor Duggall McDougall envisioned the creation of a lake and reserve in its place.

== Location ==
Lake Weeroona is north of the Bendigo central business district on the corner of Nolan Street and Napier Street. It is set on 18 hectares.

== Features and amenities ==
Lake Weeroona is home to the Bendigo Rowing Club and The Boardwalk Restaurant. A large enclosed playground, toilets and barbecues are available for public use.
