= Melbourne tram classification =

Naming system for Melbourne tram types

Melbourne's tram classification system is based on an alphanumeric combination of a primary letter for an individual vehicle type or class, with a system of prefixes and suffixes to indicate specific vehicle attributes, versions, or iterations.

== History ==
The current classification system was introduced in 1923 by Tom Percival Strickland, the Chief Engineer of the Melbourne & Metropolitan Tramways Board (M&MTB) based on his experience having previously worked on the original Sydney electric tramway network, which also used an alphanumeric tram classification schema.

With the recent unification of different council and privately-operated trams into the new M&MTB, Strickland assigned a letter-based classification to each distinct design of tram. The order of assignment was determined by the total fleet size of the original operator; and largely reflecting the sequence in which each different type of tramcar was introduced between 1906 and 1920.

While this broadly followed an alphabetical order and most letters between A and T were assigned, it was not a strict requirement; the letter 'I' was not used, possibly to avoid confusion with the numeral 1 in written records.

=== Simplification ===
Following modifications to further standardise the fleet, and aid maintenance and spare parts inventory, the classification system was simplified in 1928 (or possibly earlier) to use fewer classes and recognise the common electrical traction and braking equipment being retrofitted to vehicles of similar outline. This included:

- All the drop-end combination trams of the B, H, J, M, and S classes being added to A class;
- The straight sill combination classes F, K, Q, and R, being added to G class;
- Drop-end-and-centre Maximum traction bogie combination classes D, E, N, and P, were added to C class.

=== Modern era ===
While Comeng had developed an iteration of the Z Class (with an internal designation of 'Z4 Class'), this was subsequently abandoned at the direction of the incoming Cain Labor government in 1982, who requested a contract variation to deliver twenty-eight single-unit trams of a revised design to be known as the A1 Class, and what would later become the two B1 Class articulated prototype trams. With the original A Class trams having long been retired, this reset the letter-based classifications which all subsequent modern trams have followed.

== Prefixes and suffixes ==
As the standard types were modified or iterated, variations on a design were given extra letters or incremental numerals before and after the main class letter, to indicate particular features, individual vehicle upgrades, or where a design had been improved.

=== Prefixes ===
S - used to indicate trams of a particular class that had been upgraded from canvas blinds and drop bars to sliding doors - including the SW2, SW5, and SW6 classes.

C - when used as a prefix, this denoted trams fitted with recycled traction and braking equipment recovered from former C Class trams. Only used on the CW5 Class.

=== Suffixes ===
==== Numerical ====
Numerical suffixes may be applied to a variant of a tram class in the following scenarios:

- When a current design is improved or iterated, and new vehicles are constructed (e.g. W to W1 and W1 to W2; Y to Y1, X1 to X2 Class)
- When an individual tram, or several trams in a class are upgraded or rebuilt to an improved configuration (e.g. Z to Z1 Class; W6/SW6/W7 to W8 Class)
- When two variants of a type-common tram design are planned to be delivered in the same timeframe (e.g. A1/A2, D1/D2, and G1/G2 classes)

If only one type of vehicle is planned to be introduced, a numerical suffix is not used for the initial vehicle design (e.g. Z Class and E Class) but may be added with later substantial upgrading or rebuild.

==== Alphabetical ====
Alphabetical suffixes have not been frequently used for tramcars in Melbourne, with the exception of the 'C' suffix used for one former Z Class tram (No. 5) briefly reclassified as the ZC Class after it received chopper-control equipment in a trial.

Works trams used for maintenance, internal transportation, and other support tasks have been numbered individually, with individual vehicles receiving either of an:

- 'A' suffix - used for works trams between 1927 and 1934, until the equivalent lower-numbered trams from the passenger fleet were retired or cascaded to other tram networks removing this conflict and this suffix was removed; or
- 'W' suffix - used for works trams to denote their non-passenger status after 1975, to avoid conflicts with the re-starting of tramcar numbering at 1 for Z Class trams.

=== Multiple letters ===
In the 1950s and 1970s, the two prototype vehicles constructed using imported PCC type traction and braking equipment in locally constructed bodies (No. 980 and No. 1041) were each identified as the PCC Class.

The three 'luxury car' trams purchased from the Victorian Railways on the closure of the St Kilda to Brighton Beach line were classified as the VR Class in M&MTB service.

== Notation Format ==
Individual classes were initially written with the designator encased in double primes (e.g. 'Class "W"'); later official references transposed this format to "W Class". A hyphen or dash is not used for either the proper noun or compound adjective form, consistent with longstanding practice and relevant government style guidance.

== Vehicle numbering ==
Individual tram fleets had been numbered (from 1 upwards) by each of the pre-M&MTB tramway operators, but by 1924 the M&MTB had consolidated the numbering across the combined fleet. With the introduction of Z class trams, the M&MTB started a new numbering system. Tramways in Ballarat, Bendigo, Geelong, Sorrento and the Victorian Railways had their own tram numbering systems. Trams which were moved between the systems were renumbered.

There were also many non-passenger trams (such as rail grinders, breakdown cars, and freight cars) which were often derived from repurposed trams, but were not included in the classification or numbering system. Such vehicles were assigned a 'W' to denote their 'works' status.

== Classes ==
MMTB Tram Classification and Number
Image	Class	Description	Fleet numbers
	A class	Single truck, drop end, open California combination, built by Duncan & Fraser (1910–1911) for PMTT	1–20
	B class	Single truck, drop end, open California combination, built by James Moore & Sons (1917–1918) for PMTT	21–24, 84–91
C class	C class	Maximum traction, bogie, drop end and centre combination, built by Duncan & Fraser (1913) for PMTT	25–35
	D class	Maximum traction, bogie, drop end and centre combination, built by Duncan & Fraser (1914) for PMTT	36
E class	E class	Maximum traction, bogie, drop end and centre combination, built by Duncan & Fraser (1914) for PMTT	36–45
	F class	Single truck, straight sill, clerestory-roofed, single aisle summer car, built by Duncan & Fraser (1912) for PMTT	46–47
	G class	Single truck, straight sill, single aisle summer car, built by Duncan & Fraser (1913) for PMTT	48–53
H class	H class	Single truck, drop end, open California combination, built by Duncan & Fraser (1913) for PMTT	54–63
J class	J class	Single truck, drop end, open California combination, built by Meadowbank Manufacturing Company (1915) for PMTT	64–83
	K class	Single truck, drop end, open California combination, built by Moore (1919–1920) for PMTT	92–100
	L class	Bogie combination, built by James Moore & Sons (1921) for PMTT	101–106
M class	M class	Single truck, drop end, open California combination, built by Duncan & Fraser (1917) for HTT and FTT	107–116, 183–189
Image needed	N class	Maximum traction, bogie, drop end and centre combination, built by Duncan & Fraser (1916) for HTT	117–126
	O class	Maximum traction, bogie, straight sill, combination with one drop end, built by Duncan & Fraser (1912) for PMTT	127–130
P class	P class	Maximum traction, bogie, drop end and centre combination, built by Duncan & Fraser (1917–18) for HTT	131–138
	Q class	Single truck, straight sill, closed combination, built by MMTB (1922–1923)	139–150, 190–201
	R class	Single truck, straight sill, closed combination, built by James Moore & Sons (1920) for FNPTT	151–153
	R class	Single truck, straight sill, closed combination, built by MMTB (1920)	172–176
	S Class	Single truck, drop end, open California combination built by Duncan & Fraser (1916–1922) for MBCTT and MMTB	154–171
	T Class	Single truck, drop end, open combination with long saloon, built by Duncan & Fraser (1917) for MBCTT	177–182
U class	U Class	Single truck, saloon, built by J.G. Brill and assembled by Duncan & Fraser (1906) for NMETL	202–211
	V Class	Single truck, open cross bench, built by J.G. Brill and assembled by Duncan & Fraser (1906) for NMETL	212–216
	W Class	Bogie drop centre combination, built 1923–1927 by Holden, James Moore & Sons and MMTB	219–418
	W1 Class	Bogie drop centre combination, built by MMTB (1925–1928)	419–438, 470–479
W2 class	W2 Class	Bogie drop centre combination, built by MMTB and James Moore & Sons (1927–31)	439–458, 480–609, 624–653
W3 class	W3 Class	Bogie drop centre combination, built MMTB (1930–1934)	654–669
W4 class	W4 Class	Bogie drop centre combination, built MMTB (1933–1935)	670–674
	CW5 Class	Maximum traction, bogie, drop centre combination, built MMTB (1934–1935)	681–685
W5 class	W5 Class	Bogie, drop centre combination, built by MMTB (1935–1939)	720–839
	SW2 Class	Bogie drop centre saloon, built by MMTB (1938, 1953, 1955)	275, 426, 432, 436, 478, 644
SW5 class	SW5 Class	Bogie, drop centre saloon, built by MMTB (1939–1940, 840–849), converted by Metropolitan Transit Authority (1983–1986, all the other tram cars)	681–682, 721–734, 736–750, 752–755, 757–760, 764–765, 767–770, 773, 775–777, 780–781, 784–791, 793, 796–797, 800, 802, 805–812, 814–816, 818–819, 824, 828–830, 834, 836–838, 840–849
SW6 class	SW6 Class	Bogie drop centre saloon, built by MMTB (1939–1951)	850–969
	PCC class (1950)	Two door bogie saloon, built by MMTB (1950)	980
W6 class	W6 Class	Bogie, drop centre saloon, built by MMTB (1951–1955)	970–979, 981–1000
W7 class	W7 Class	Two door bogie saloon, built by MMTB (1955–1956)	1001–1040
	W8 Class	Bogie drop centre saloon, converted from SW6/W6/W7 trams 946, 959 (2013), 957 (2015), 1010 (2016), 983 (2017), 856, 928, 961 (2019), 888 (2020)	856, 888, 928, 946, 957, 959, 961, 981, 983, 1010
	X class	Single truck saloon safety car, built by JG Brill Company & St Louis Car Company (1923)	217–218
	X1 Class	Single truck saloon, built by MMTB (1926–1928)	459–468
	X2 Class	Single truck saloon, built by MMTB (1930)	674 (later 680), 675–679
	Y Class	Bogie saloon, built by MMTB (1927)	469
Y1 class	Y1 Class	Bogie saloon, built by MMTB (1930)	610–613
PCC class (1973)	PCC class (1973)	Prototype two door bogie saloon, last ever tram built by MMTB (1973). Formed the basis of the Z1 class tram design	1041
Z1 class	Z1 Class	Two door bogie saloon, built by Comeng (1974–1978)	1–100
Z2 class	Z2 Class	Two door bogie saloon, built by Comeng (1978–1979)	101–115
Z3 class	Z3 Class	Three door bogie saloon, built by Comeng (1979–1984)	116–230
A1 class	A1 Class	Three door bogie saloon, built by Comeng (1983–1985)	231–258
A2 class	A2 Class	Three door bogie saloon, built by Comeng (1985–1987)	259–300
B1 class	B1 class	Articulated saloon, built by Comeng (1984–1985)	2001–2002
B2 class	B2 Class	Articulated saloon, built by Comeng (1987–1994)	2003–2132
C1 class	C Class	Three-section articulated saloon, low floor Alstom Citadis 202 tram (2001–2002)	3001–3036
C2 class	C2 Class	Five-section articulated saloon, low floor Alstom Citadis 302 trams (2008)	5103, 5106, 5111, 5113, 5123
D1 class	D1 Class	Three section, low floor Combino trams, made by Siemens (2002–2003)	3501–3538
D2 class	D2 Class	Five section, low floor Combino trams, made by Siemens (2003–2004)	5001–5021
E1 class	E Class	Three-section, four-bogie articulated trams built by Bombardier Transportation based on the customised Flexity Swift product (2013–2021)	6001–6100
G class	G1 Class	Three-section, low floor trams based on the customised Flexity 2 product, built by Alstom (2023–)	7001–7100
