= K-class tram =

K-class tram may refer to:

- K-class Melbourne tram, built 1919–1920
- K-class Sydney tram, built 1908–1913
