= J class =

J class or Class J may refer to:

== Railways ==
- NBR J class, steam locomotives operated in the United Kingdom from 1909
- NZR J class (1874), steam locomotives operating in New Zealand from 1874 until 1935
- NZR J class (1939), steam locomotives operating in New Zealand from 1939
- WAGR J class, steam locomotives operating in Western Australia from the 1890s
- WAGR J class (diesel), diesel locomotives operating in Western Australia from the 1960s
- Victorian Railways J class (1859), main line steam locomotives operating in Victoria, Australia from 1859 to 1912
- Victorian Railways J class (1954), branch line steam locomotives operating in Victoria, Australia from 1954 to 1972
- Norfolk and Western Railway class J (1879), steam locomotives operating in the United States from 1879 until 1900
- Norfolk and Western Railway class J (1903), steam locomotives operating in the United States from 1903 until 1935
- Norfolk and Western Railway class J (1941), steam locomotives operating in the United States from 1950 until 1959
- South Australian Railways J class, steam locomotives operating in South Australia from 1875 until 1932
- Tasmanian Government Railways J class, steam locomotive operating in Tasmania, Australia from 1901 until 1910
- J-class Melbourne tram
- J-class Sydney tram

== Watercraft ==
- J-class yacht, a racing yacht design constructed for the America's Cup competition between 1931 and 1937
- J-class destroyer, a class of British-built destroyers active from 1937 until 1949
- J-class submarine, a class of British-built submarines operated by the Royal Navy and Royal Australian Navy between 1916 and 1930
- Jymy-class motor torpedo boat, an Italian World War II boat

== Other uses ==
- J-class blimp, 1920s airships
- J-segment, a European vehicle size class
- Class. J., the ISO 4 abbreviation for The Classical Journal.
- A code used by many airlines for business class

== See also ==
- J type (disambiguation)
