= J-class tram =

J-class tram may refer to:

- J-class Melbourne tram, built 1915
- J-class Sydney tram, built 1904-1908
