= Sydney Tram Classification =

Formerly used categorisation system

Steam trams of the 1880s and 1890s had separate numbers for motors and trailers within each separate system and the unified numbering scheme was not introduced for the electric tramcars until 1890.

== Classification ==
A statewide numbering scheme was required as isolated electric segments became joined and rolling stock interchanged and major maintenance performed at Randwick Tramway Workshops. In 1905 a general alphabetical classification was introduced to the NSW Government Tramways.

In general lettering indicated:

- A and B were given to steam stock
- C through to N (and later O, P and R) to electric cars based on seating capacity.
- T was planned for trailers but not displayed
- S indicated general service, non-passenger carrying stock
- U for ballast motors
- V for ballast trailers
- W for electric water sprinklers.

New types of electric trams continued to be allocated letters, with the exception of I, Q, Y and Z.

== Classes ==
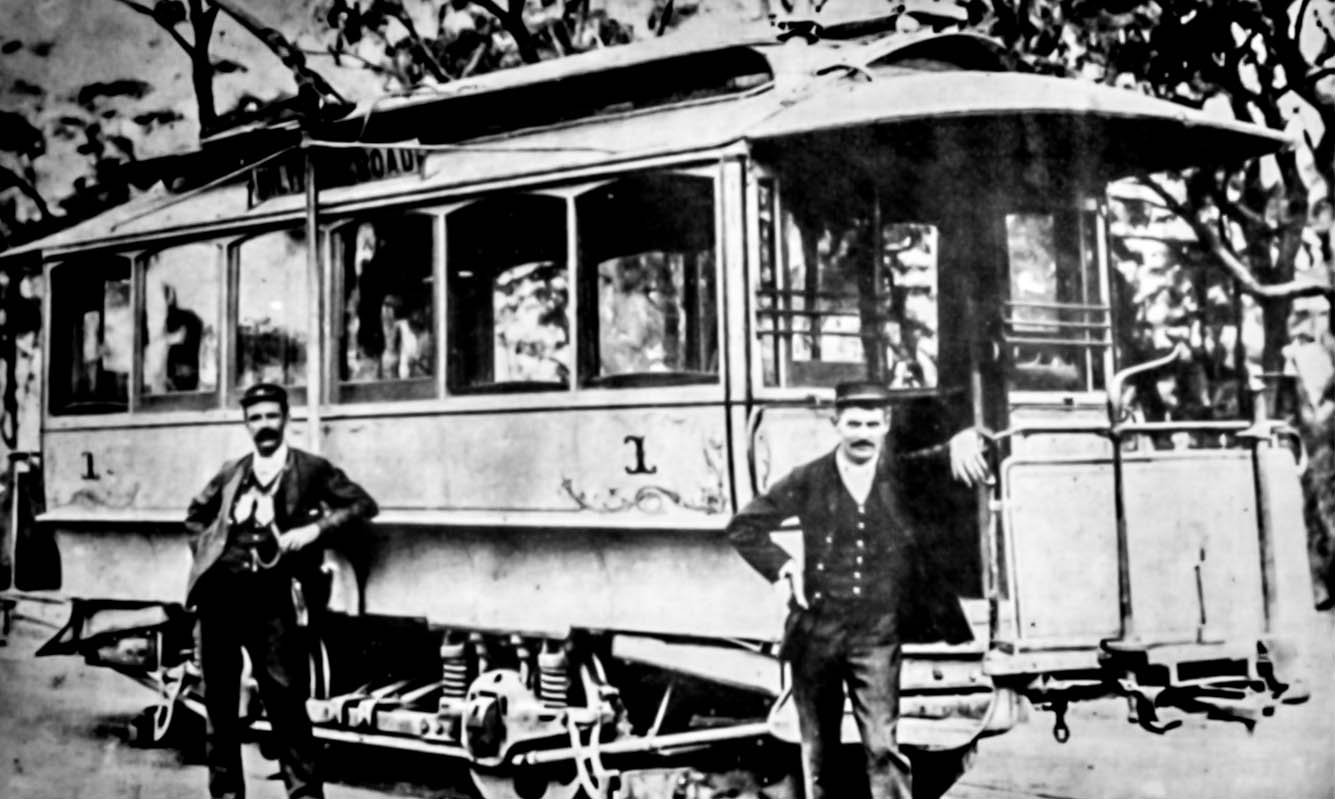
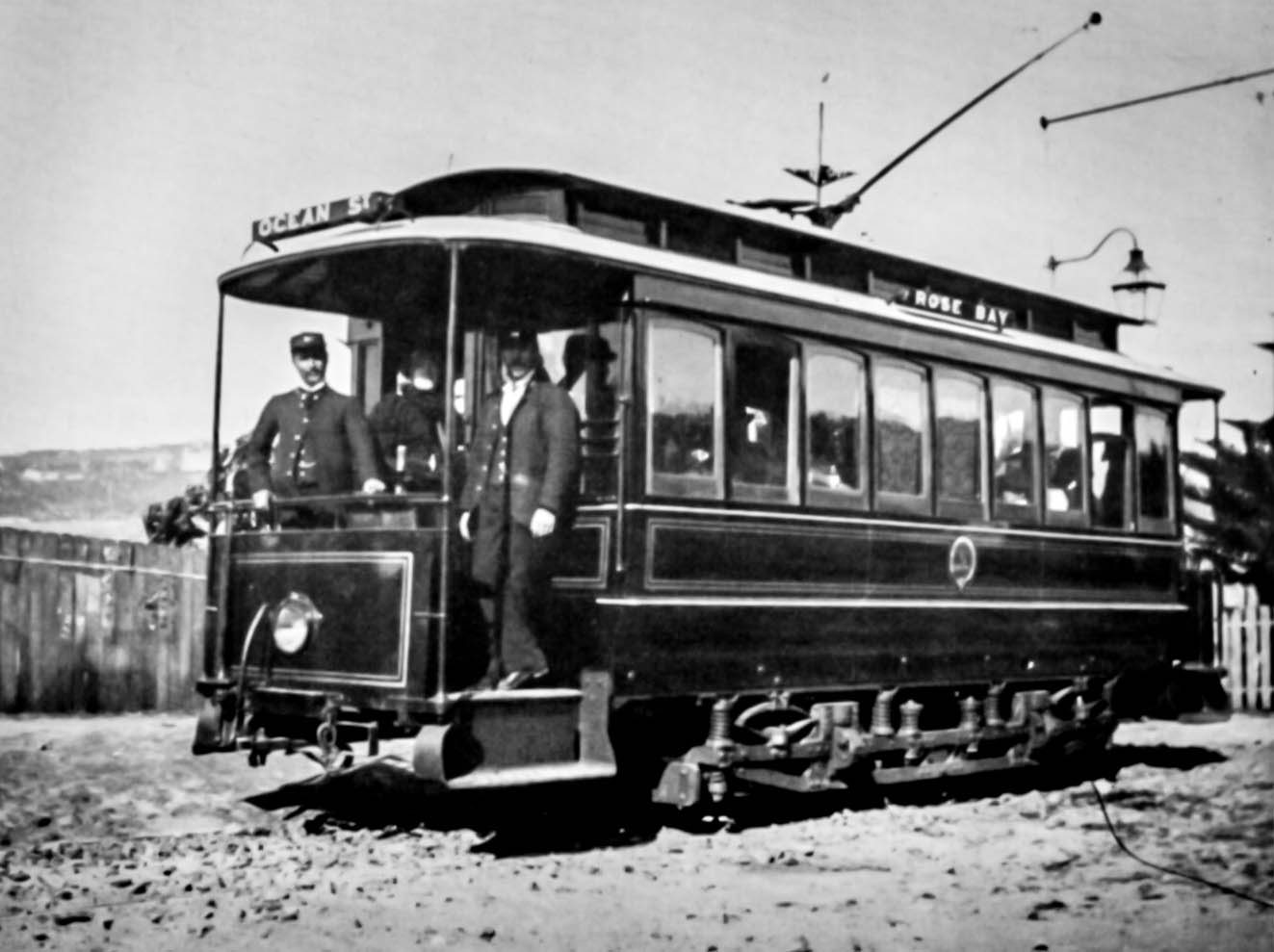
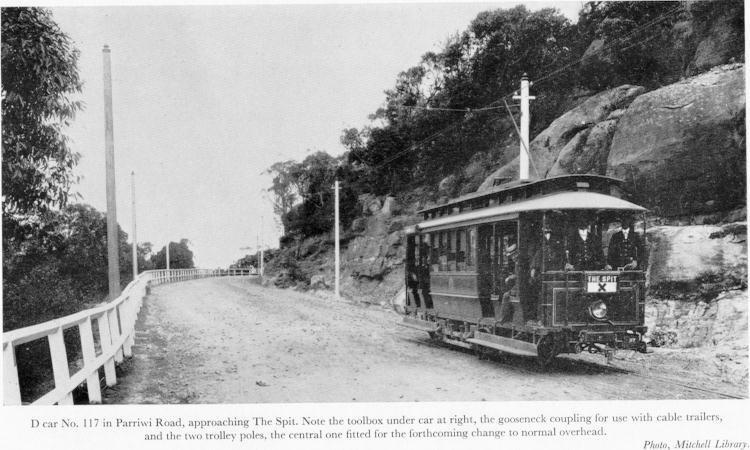
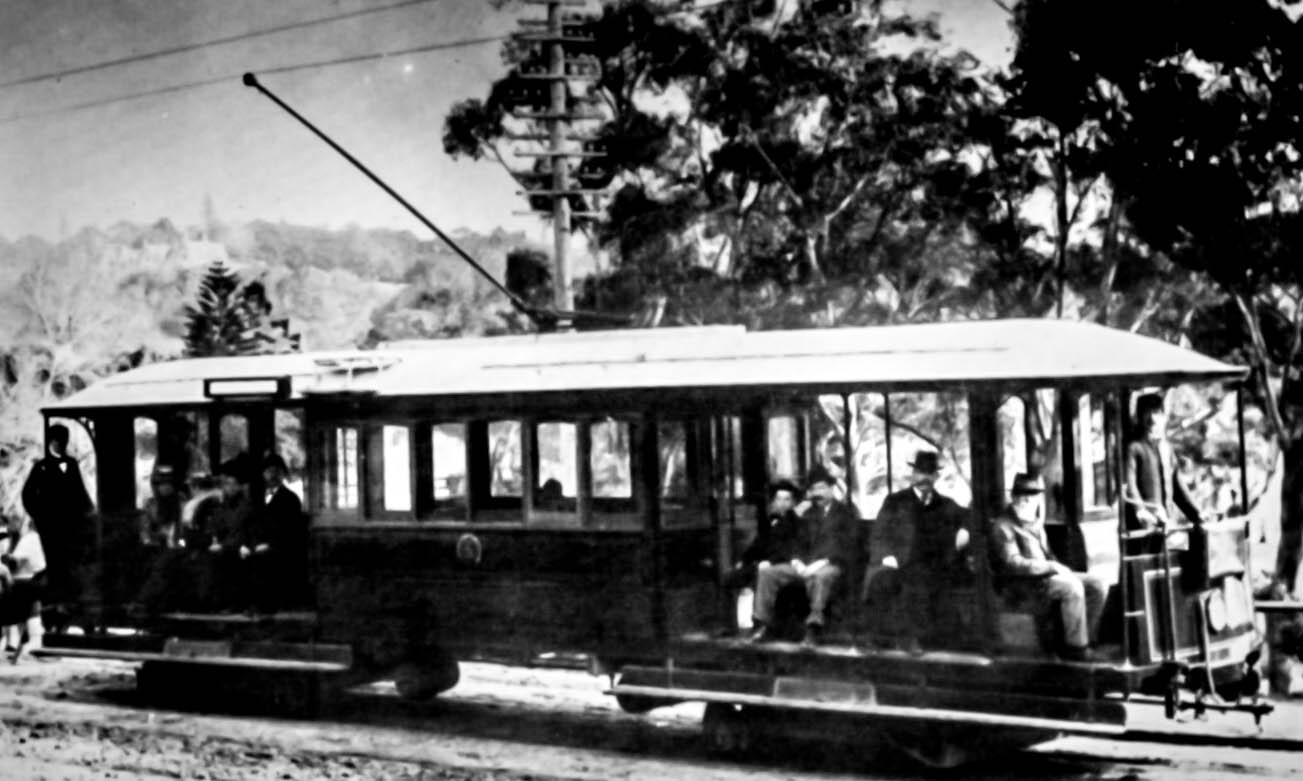
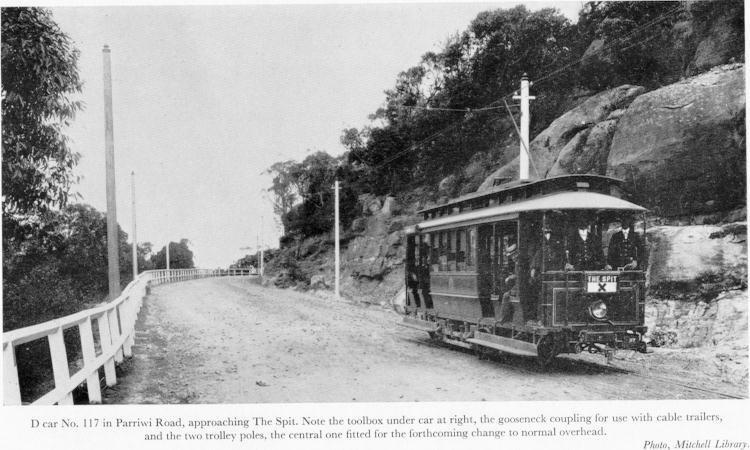
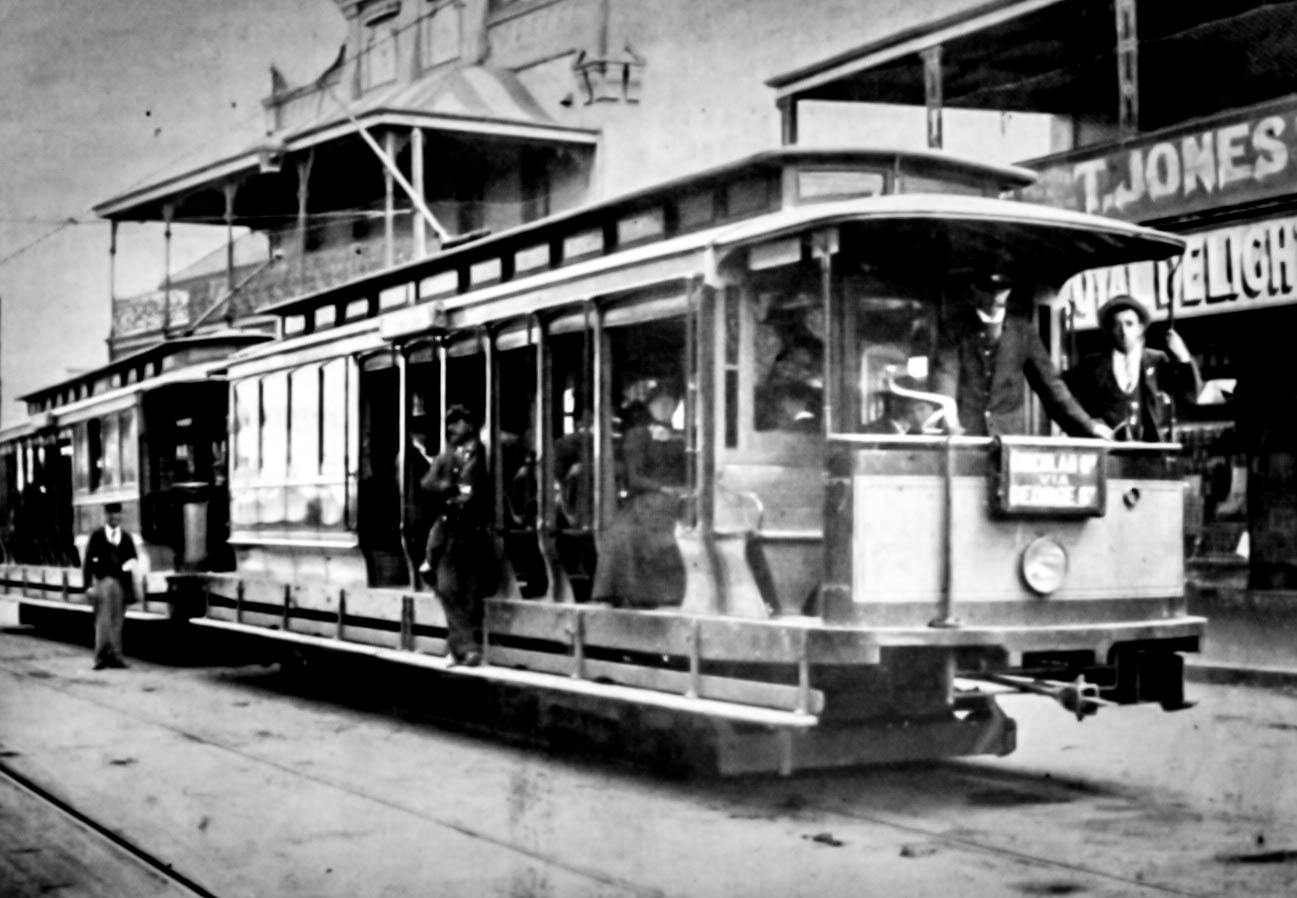
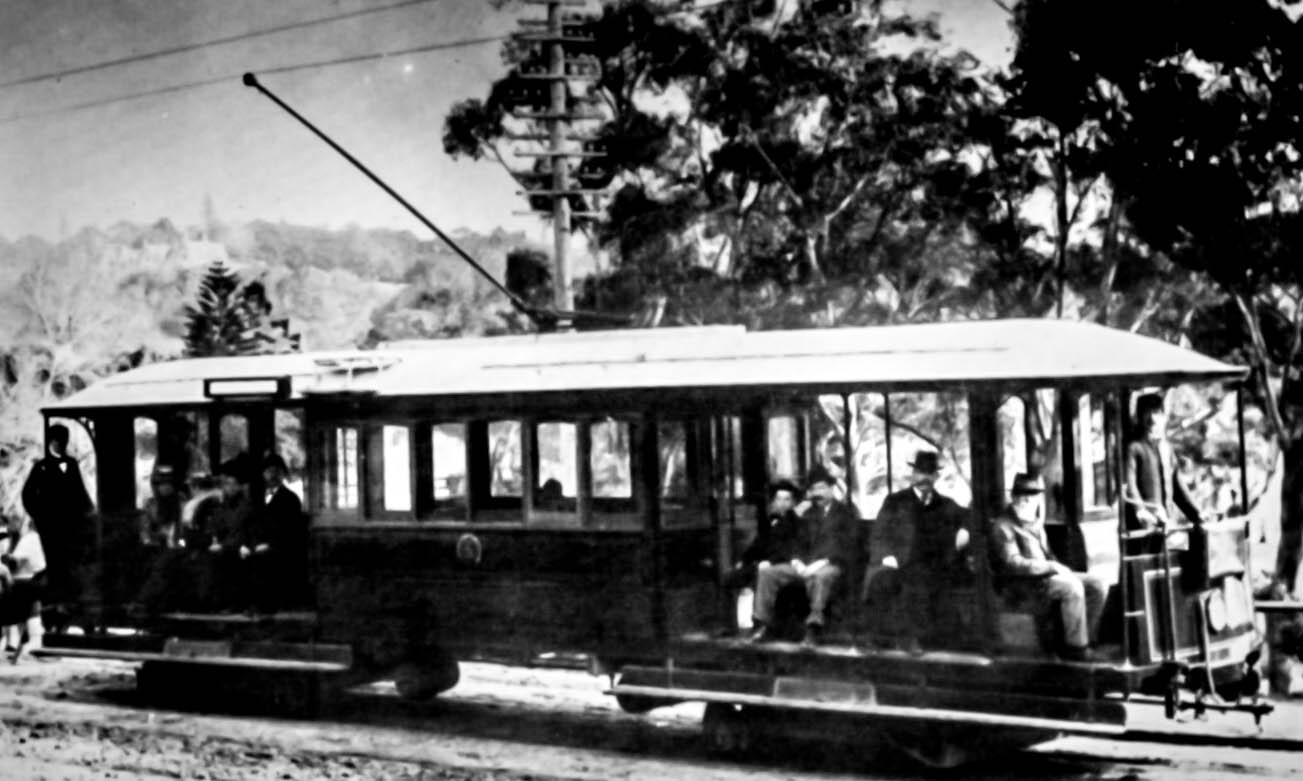
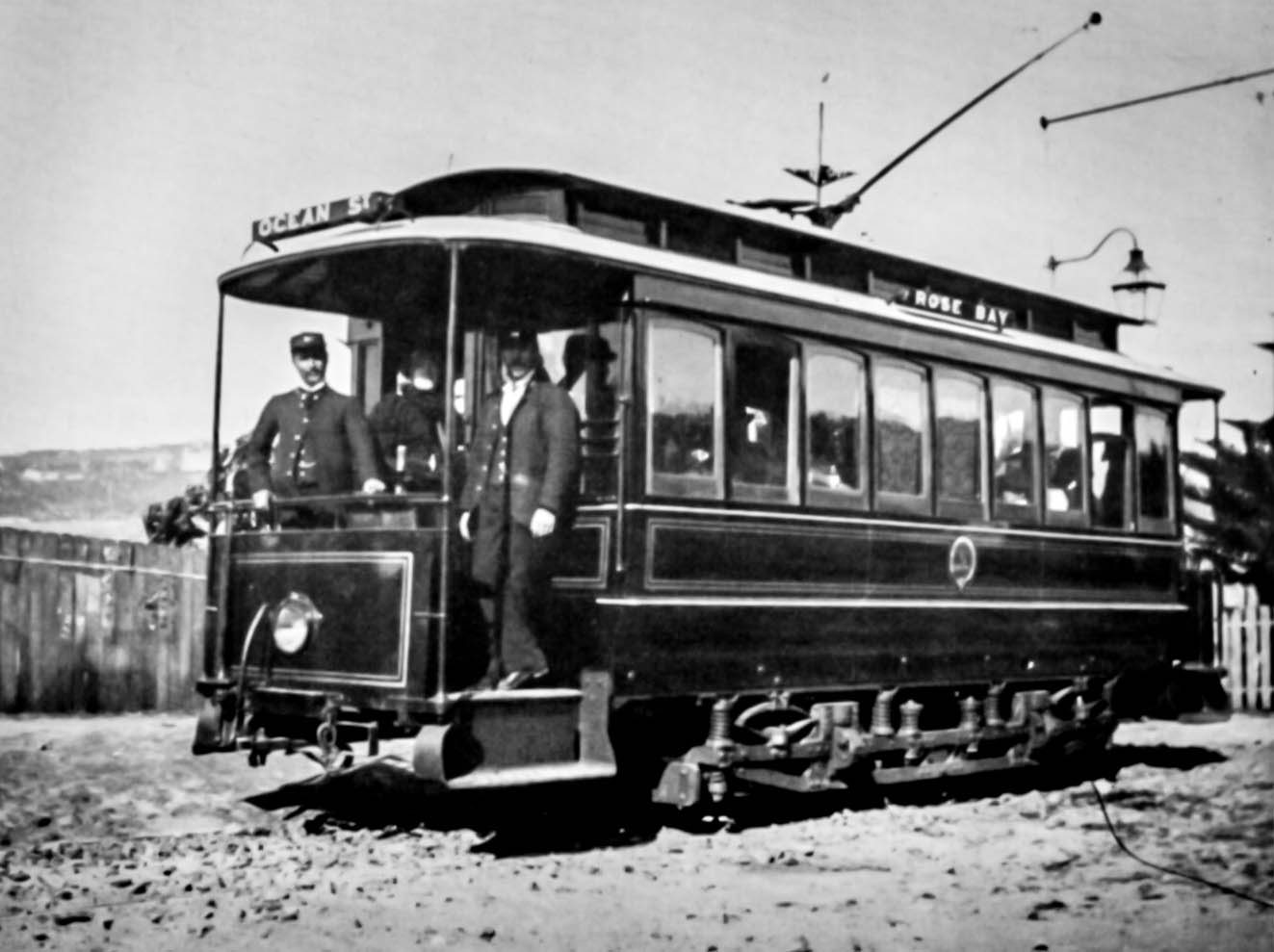
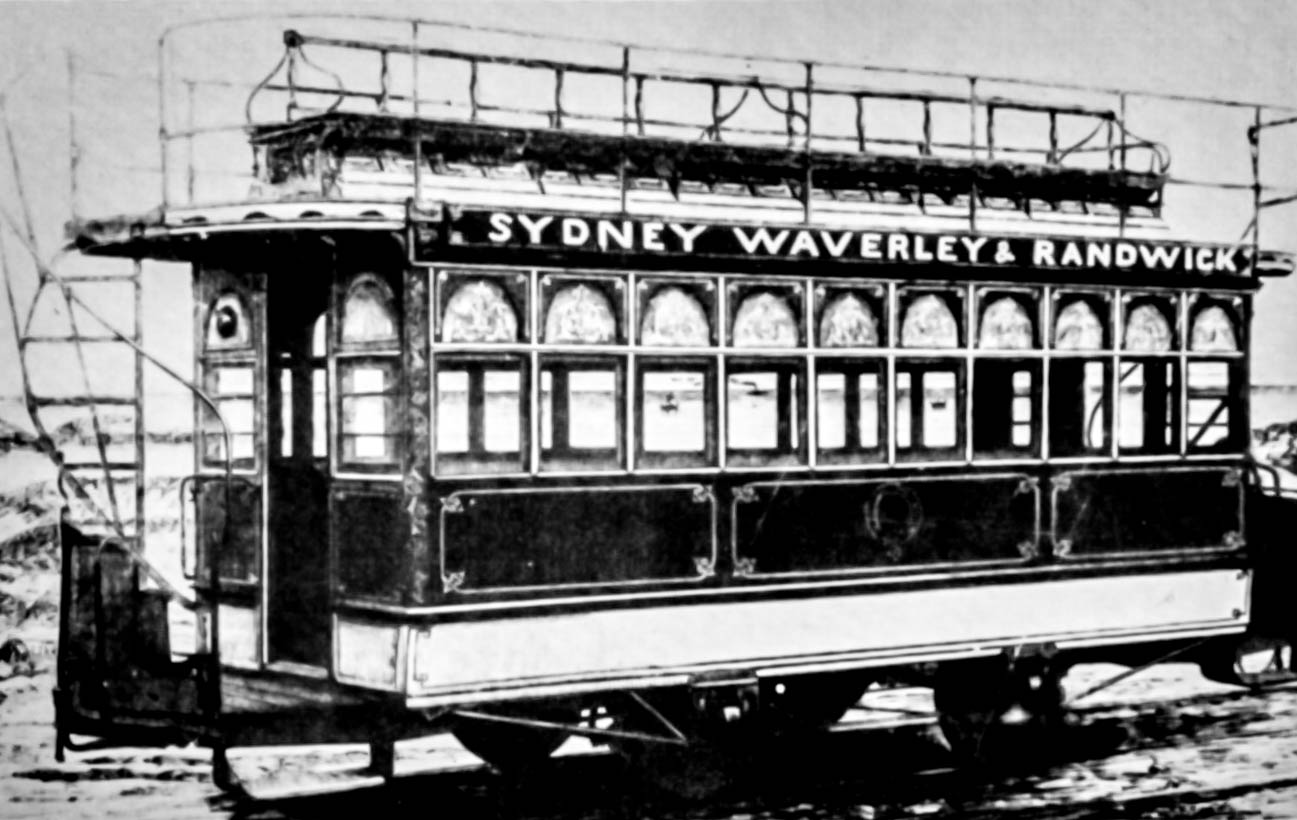
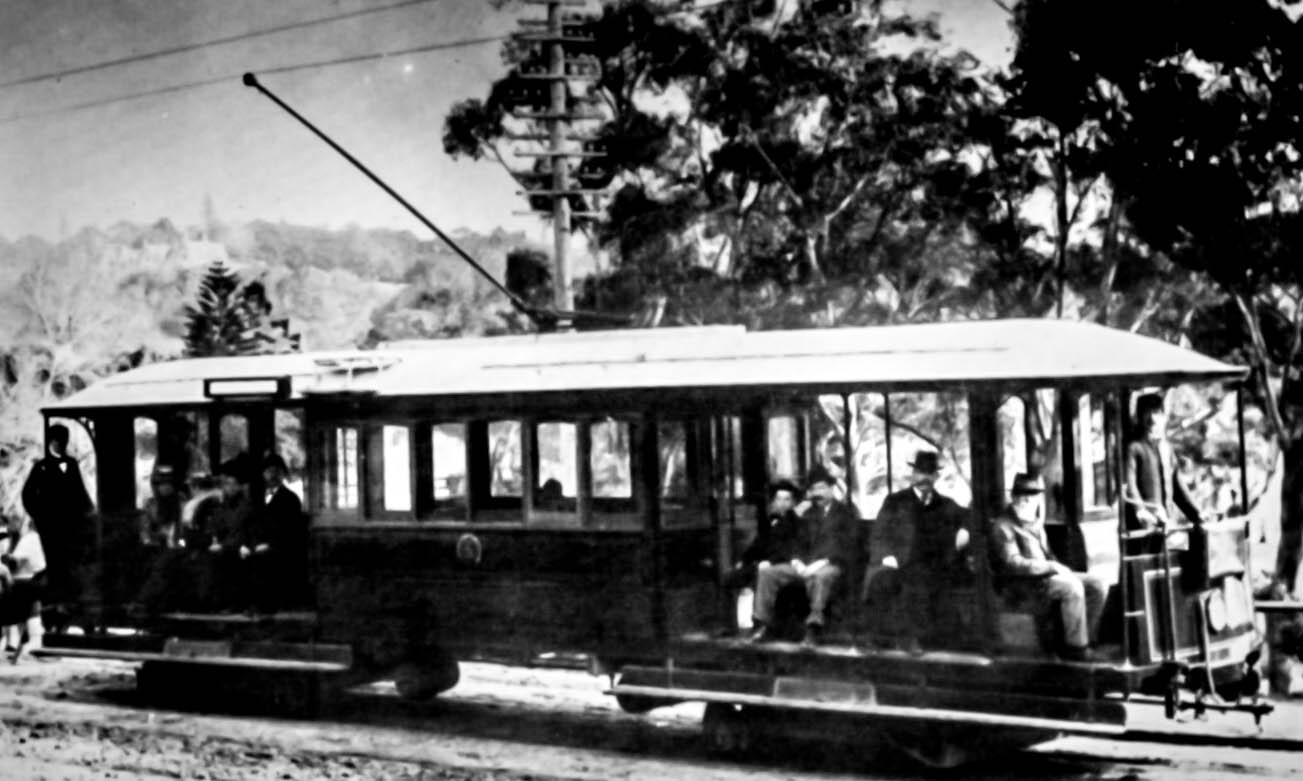
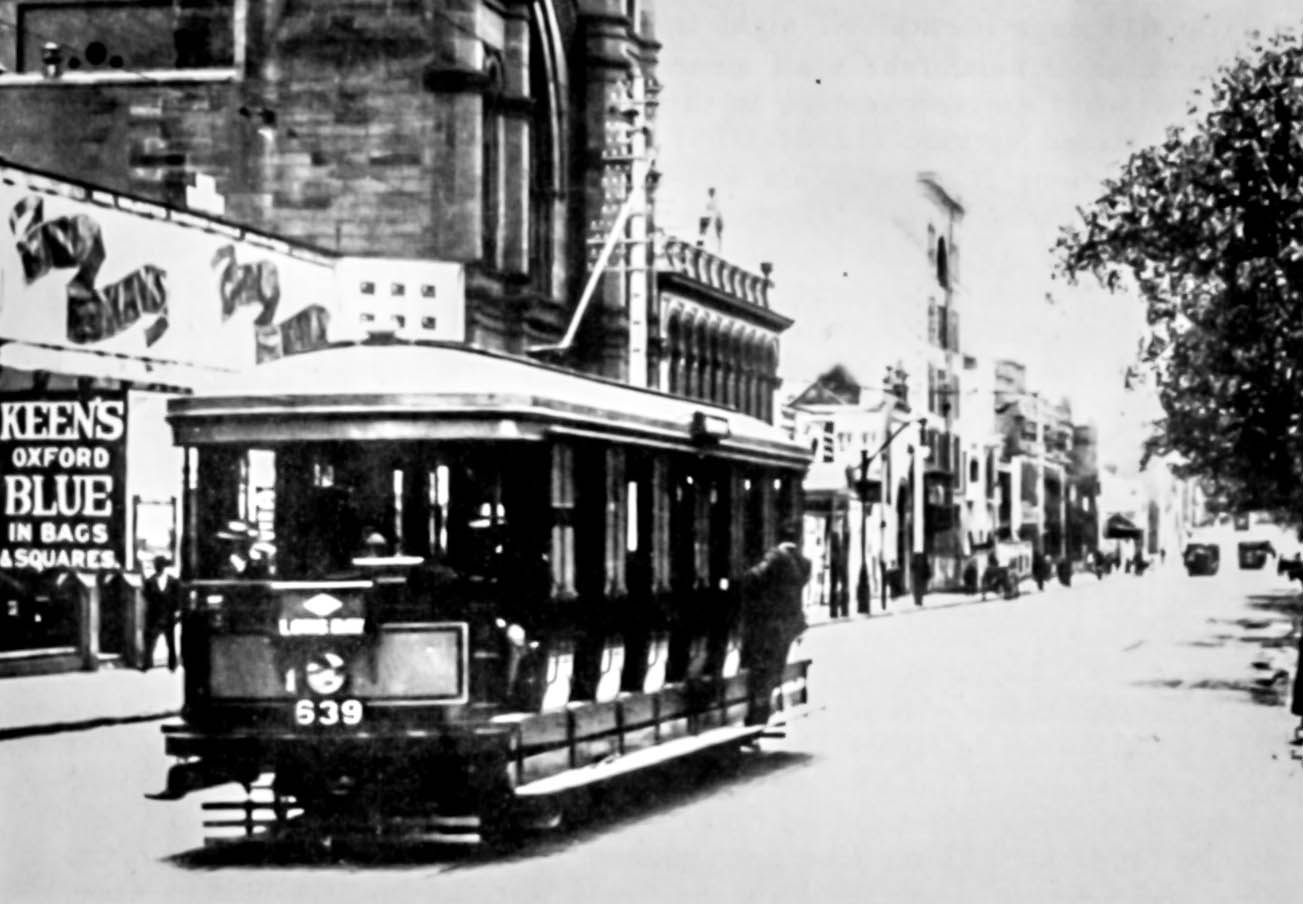
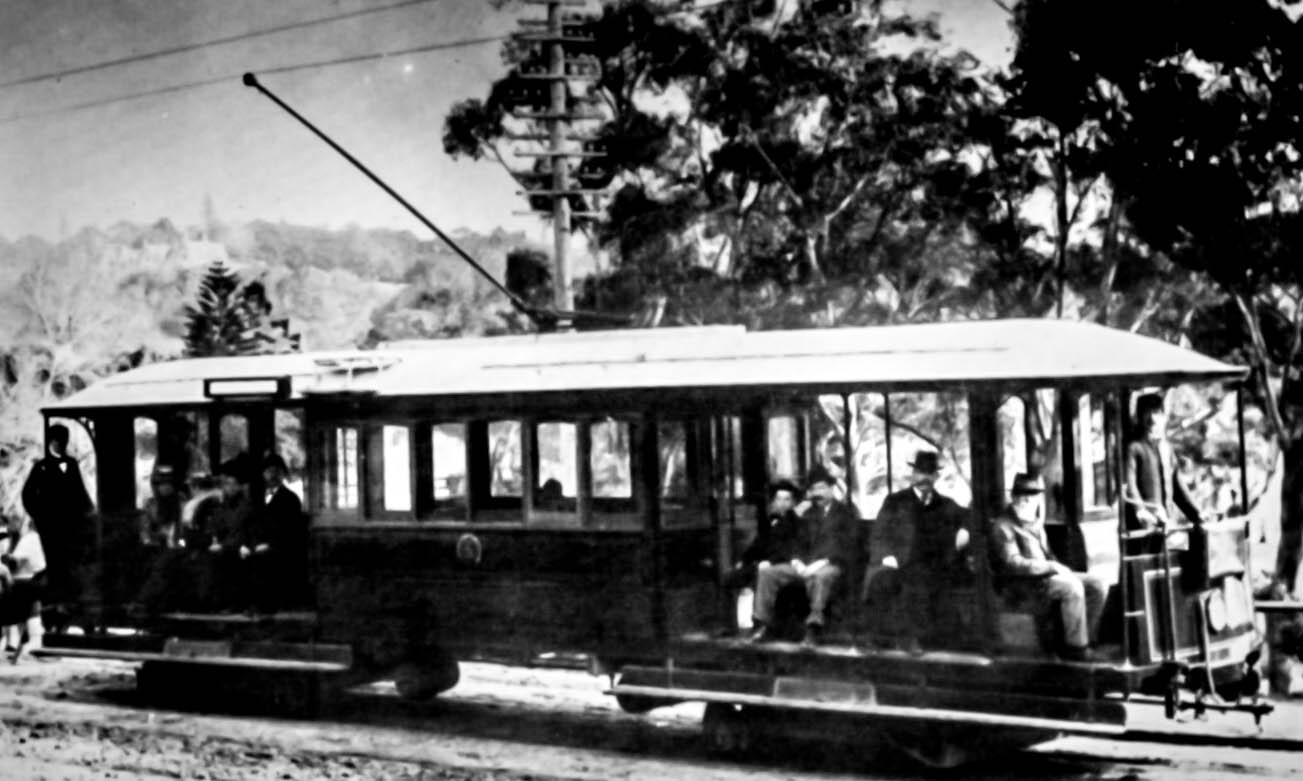
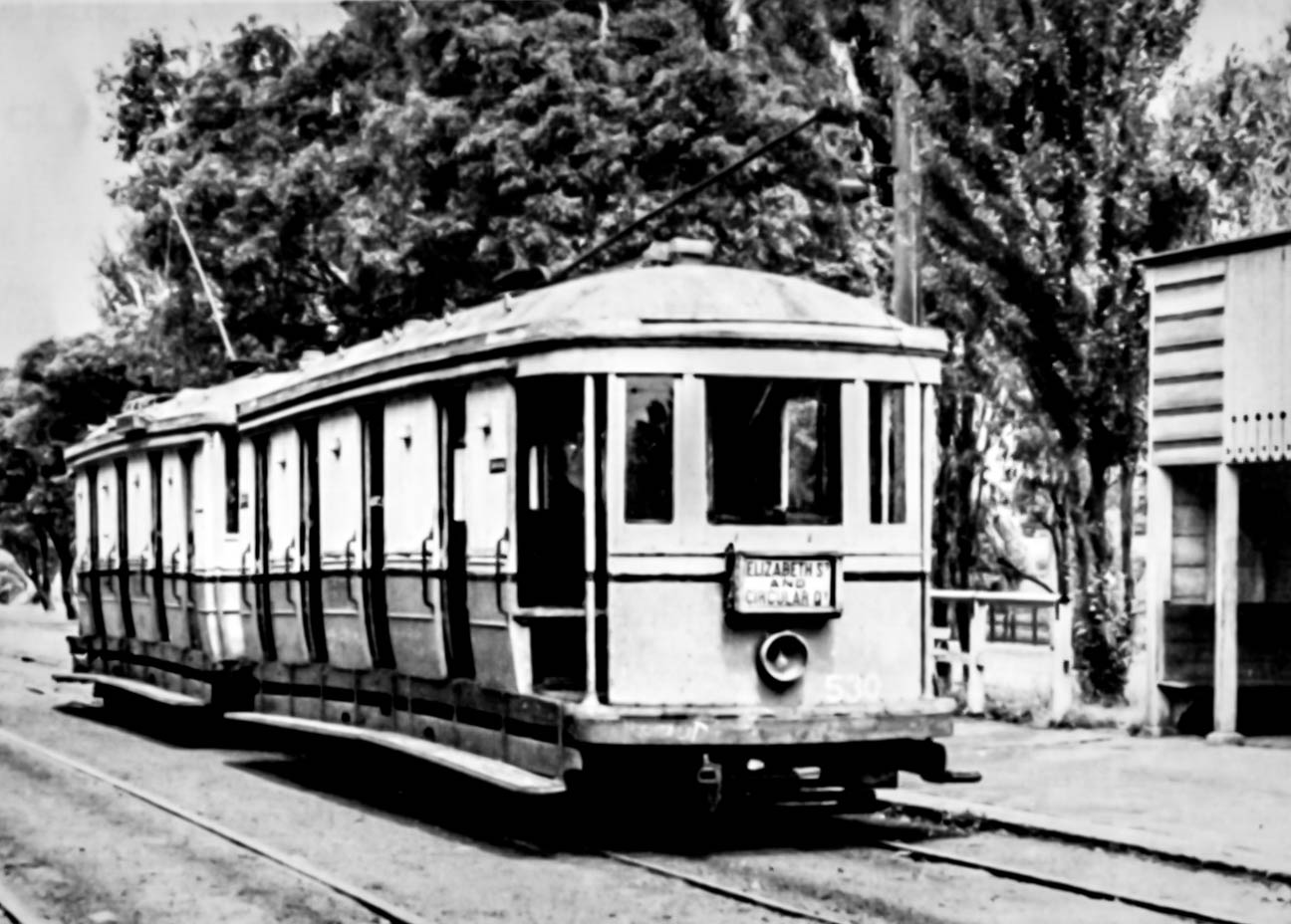
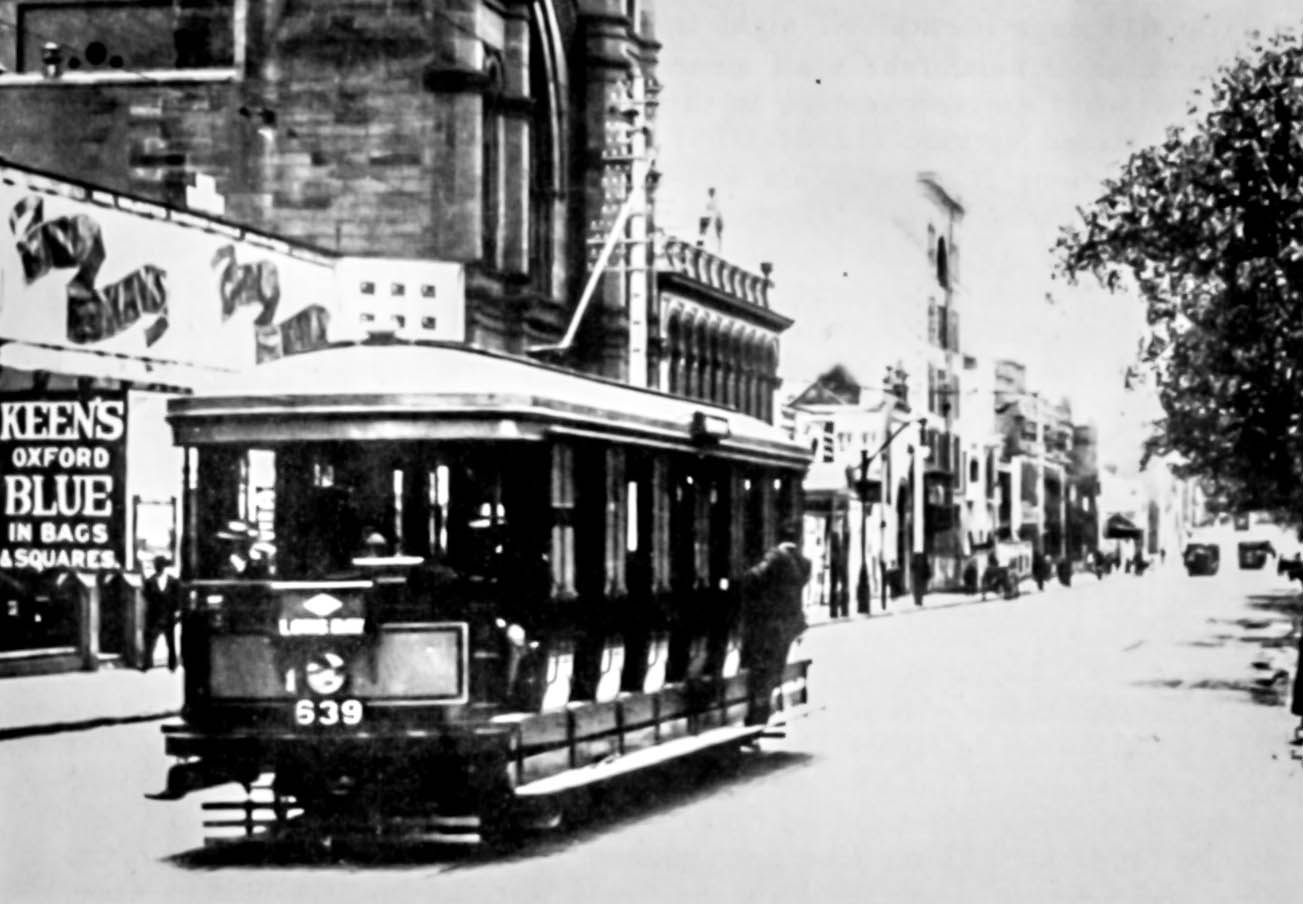
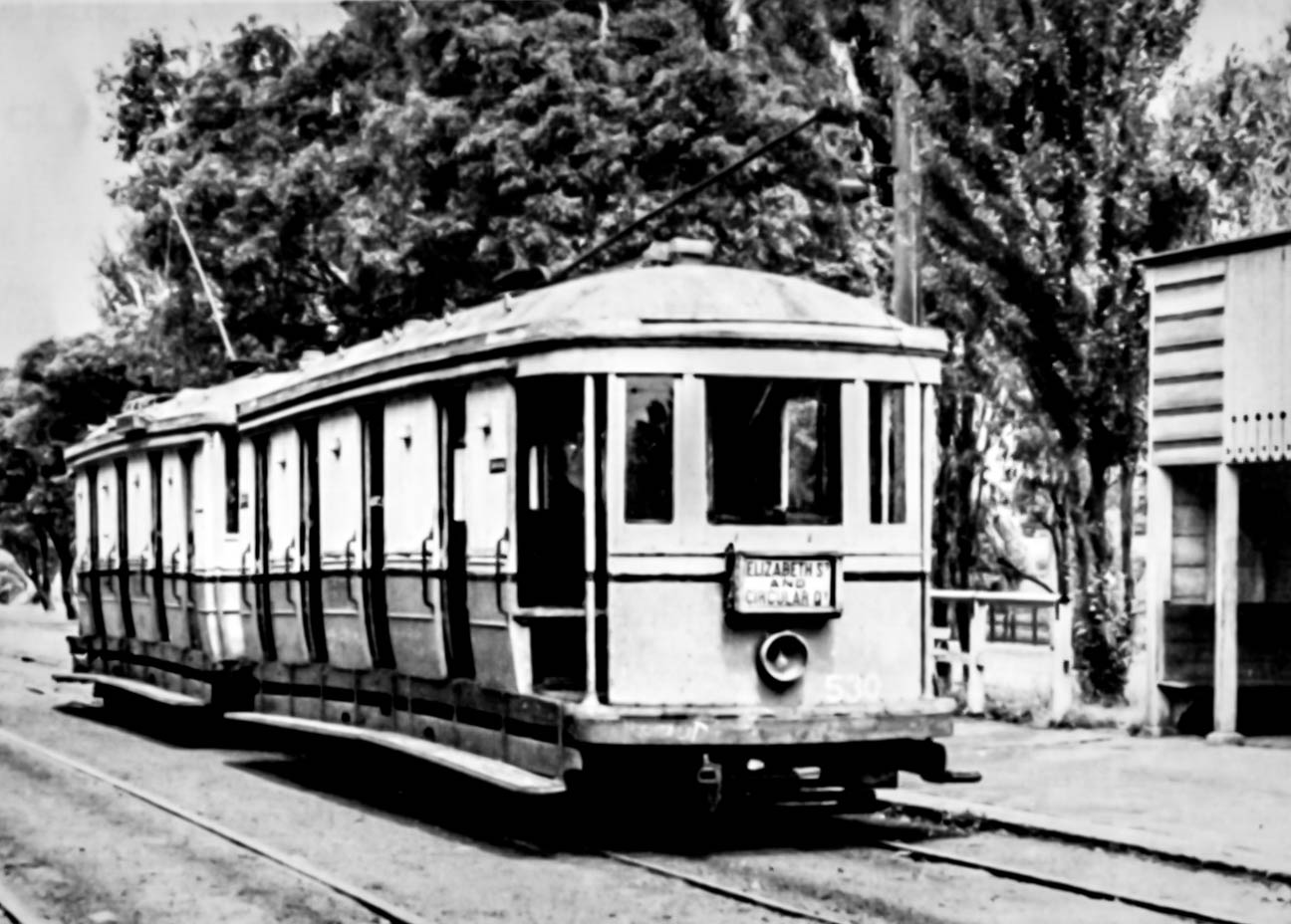
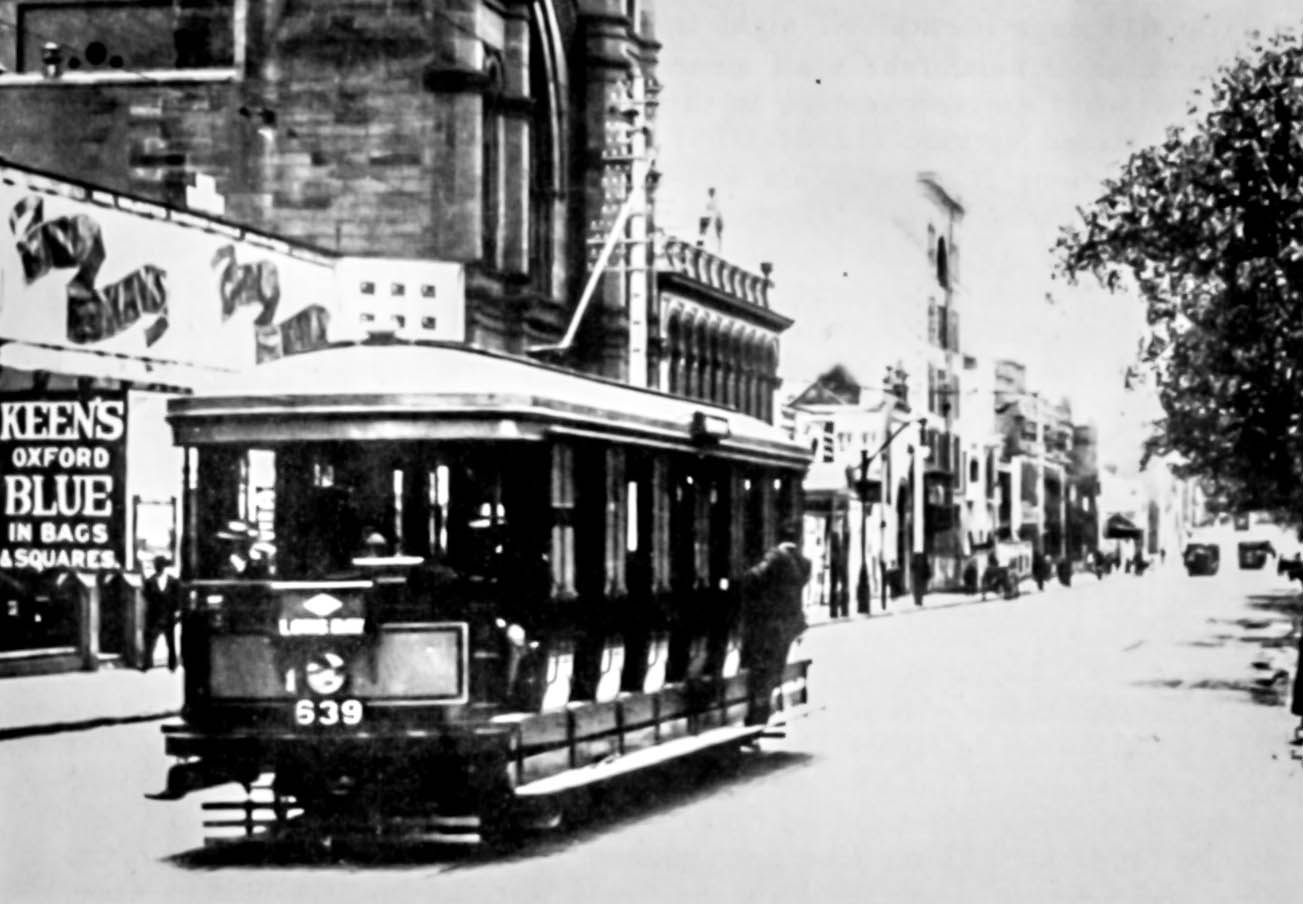
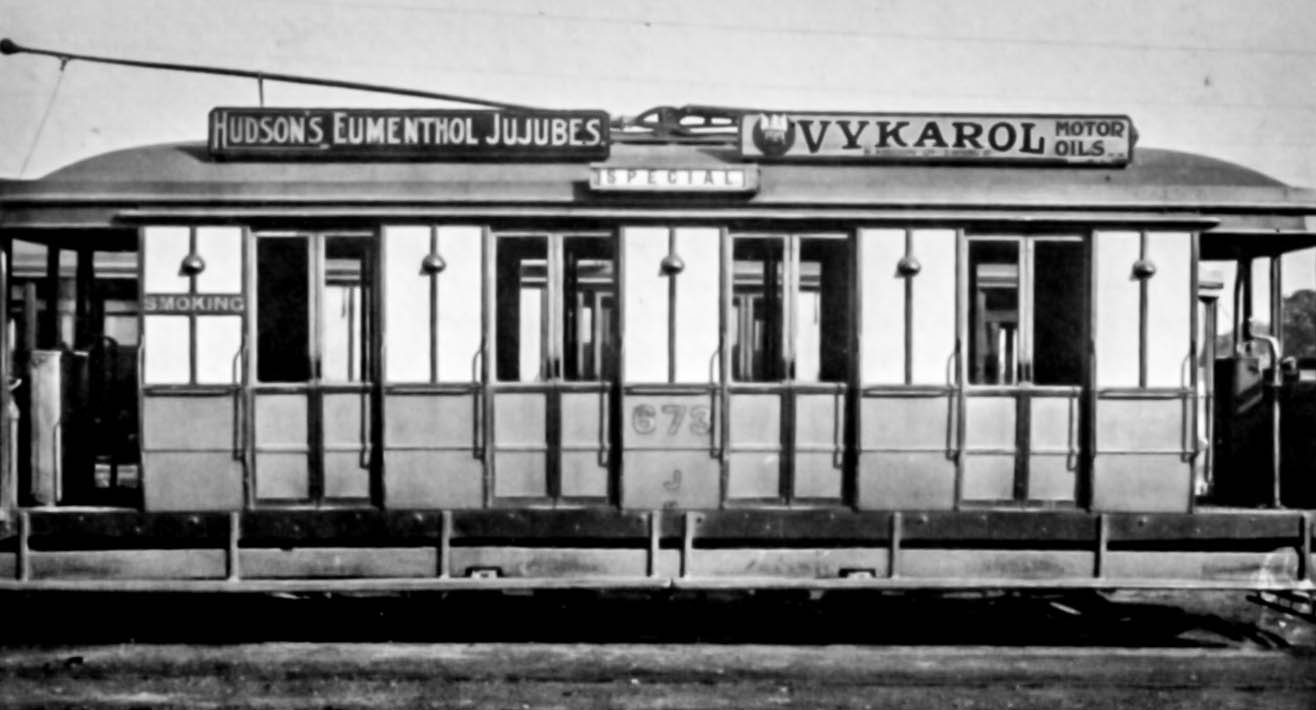
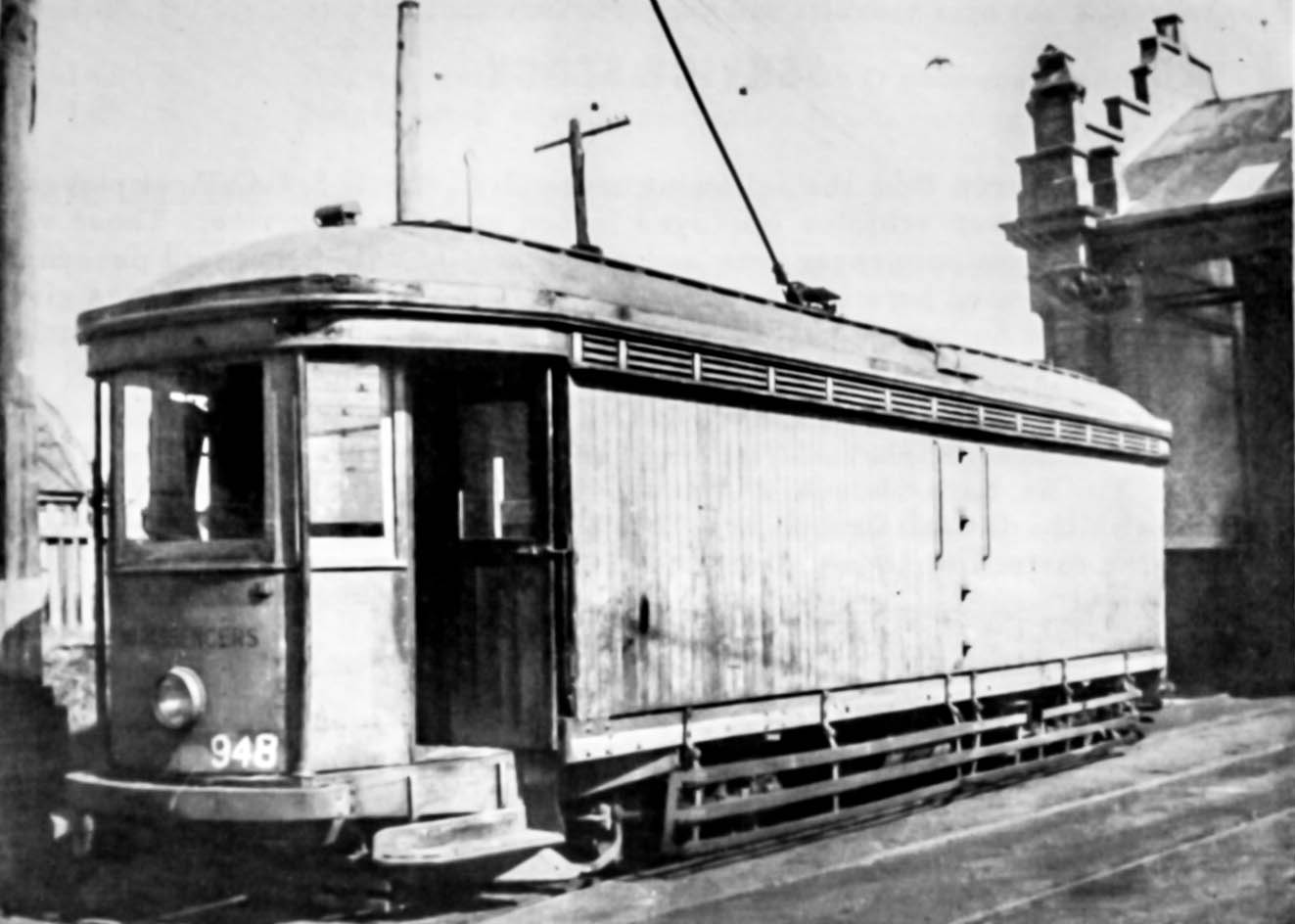
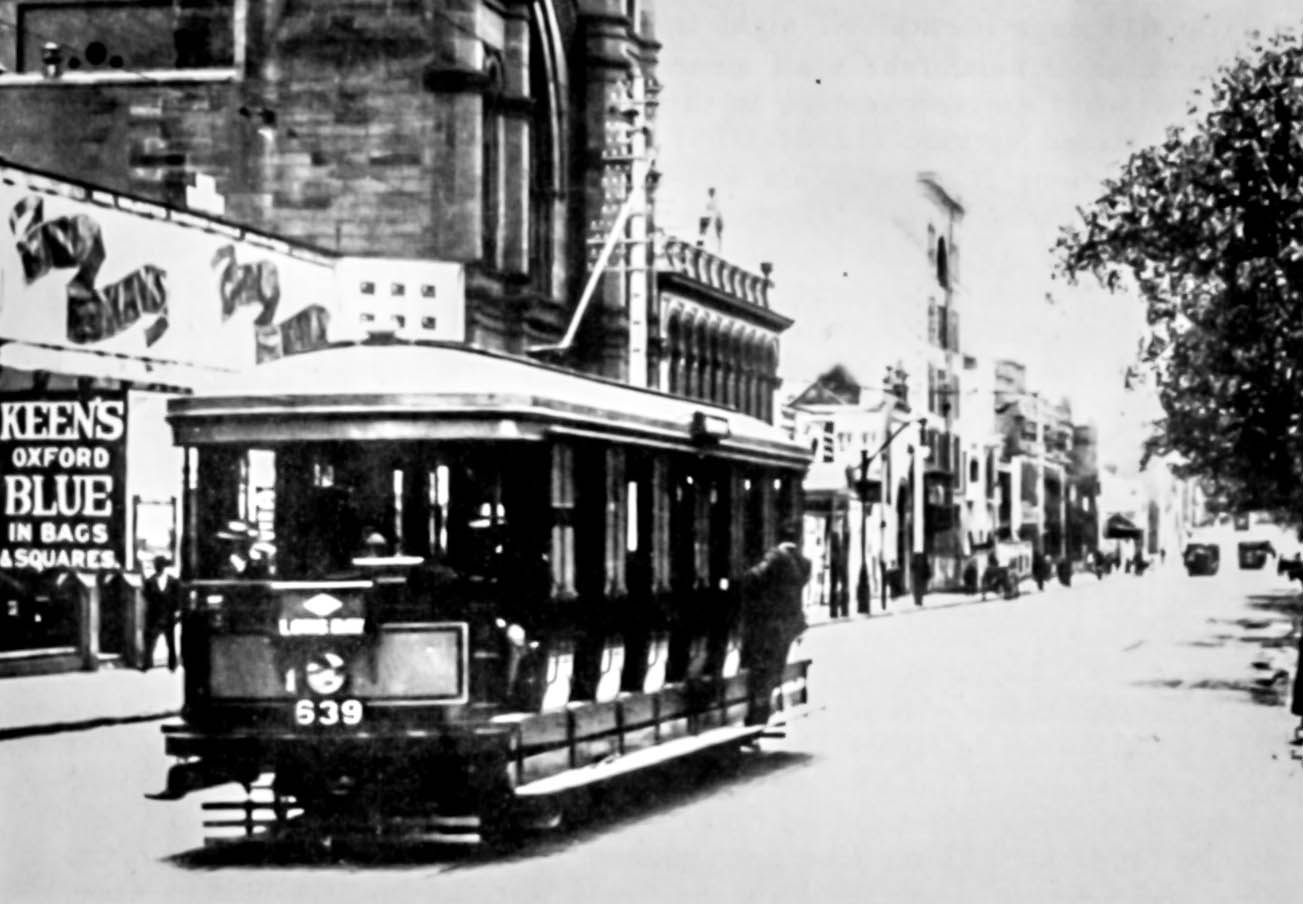
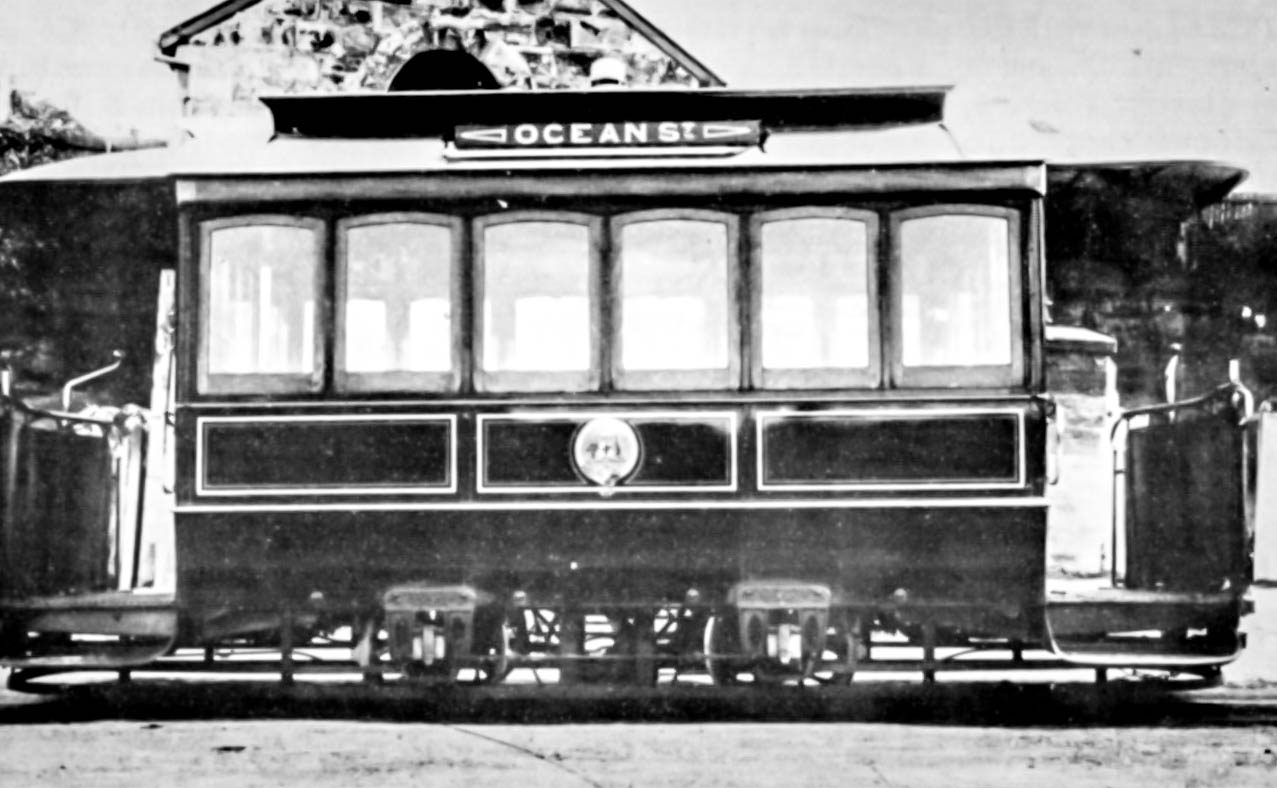
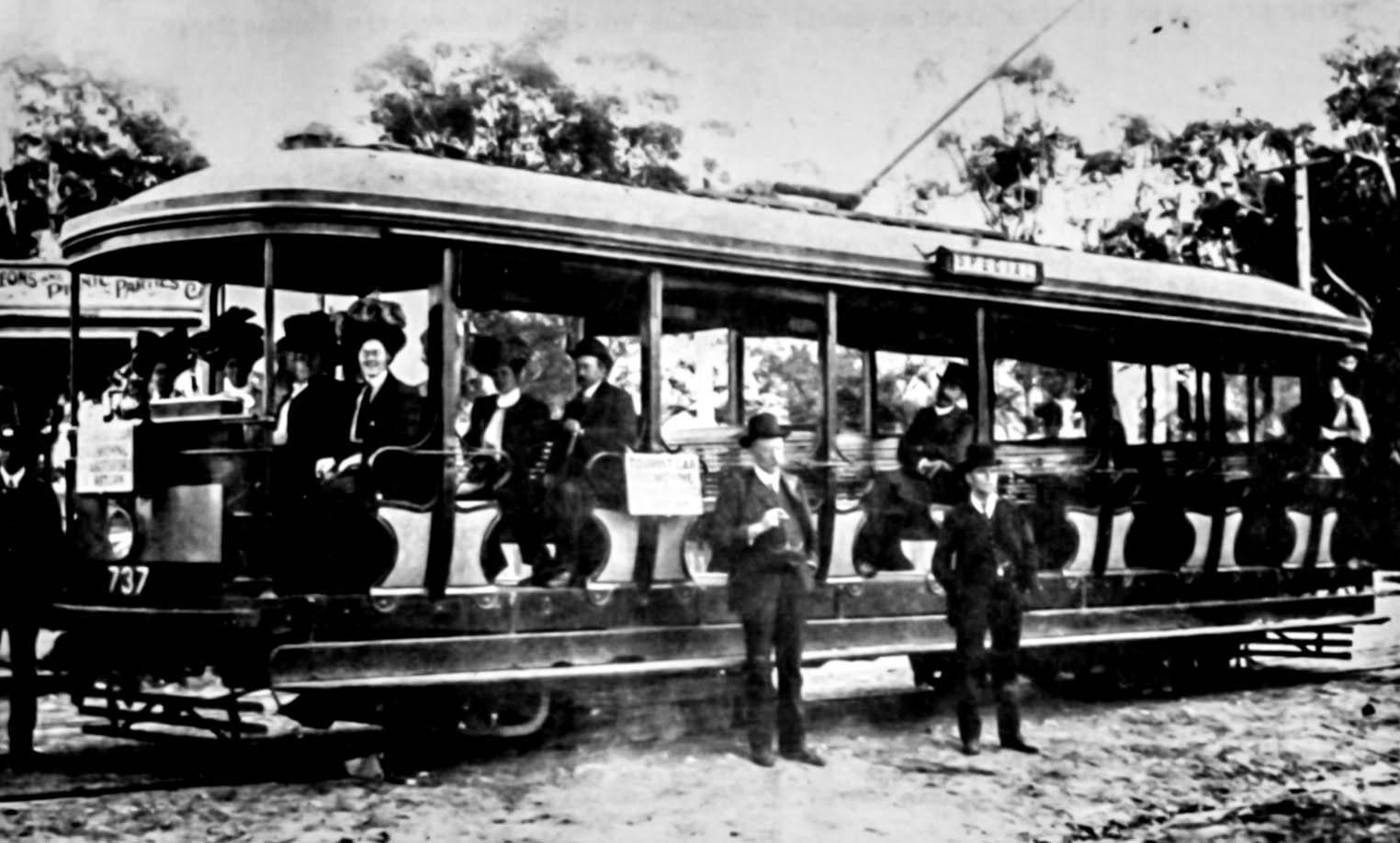
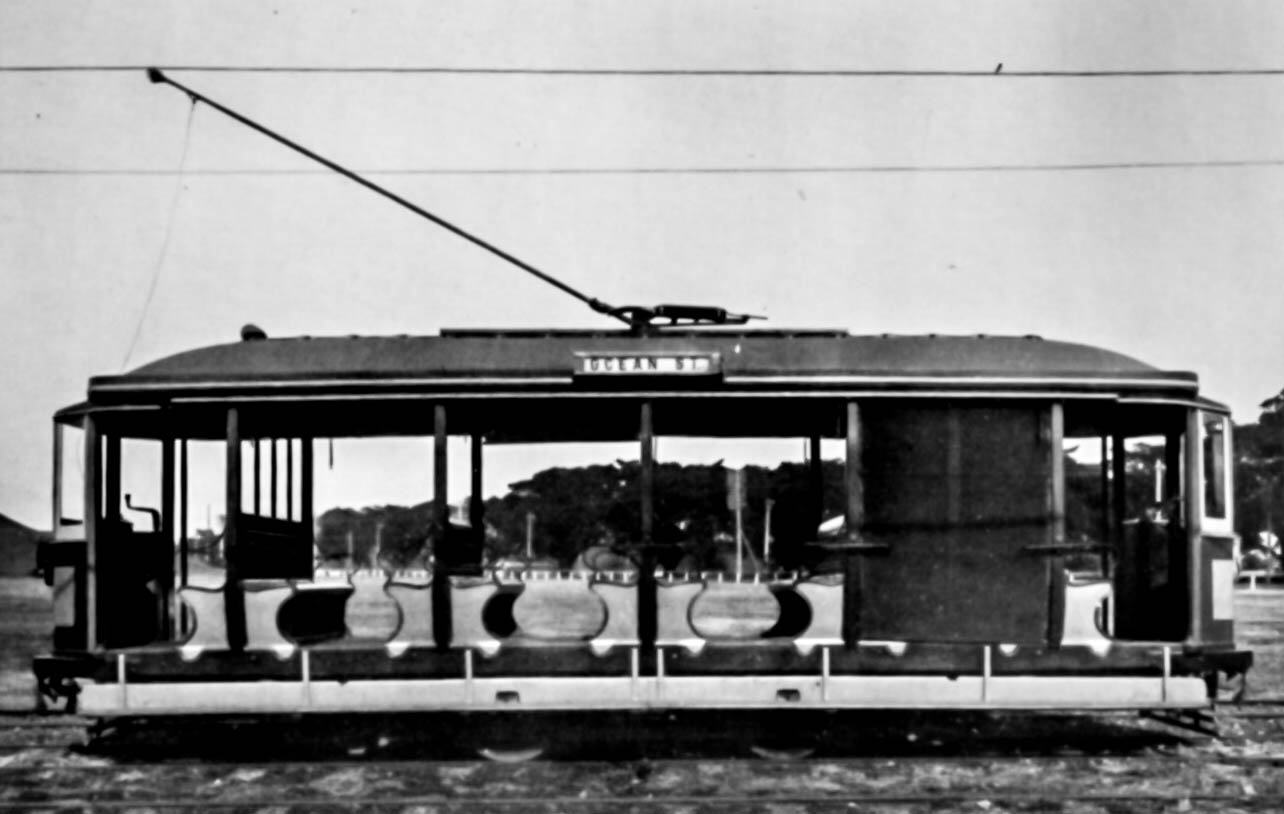
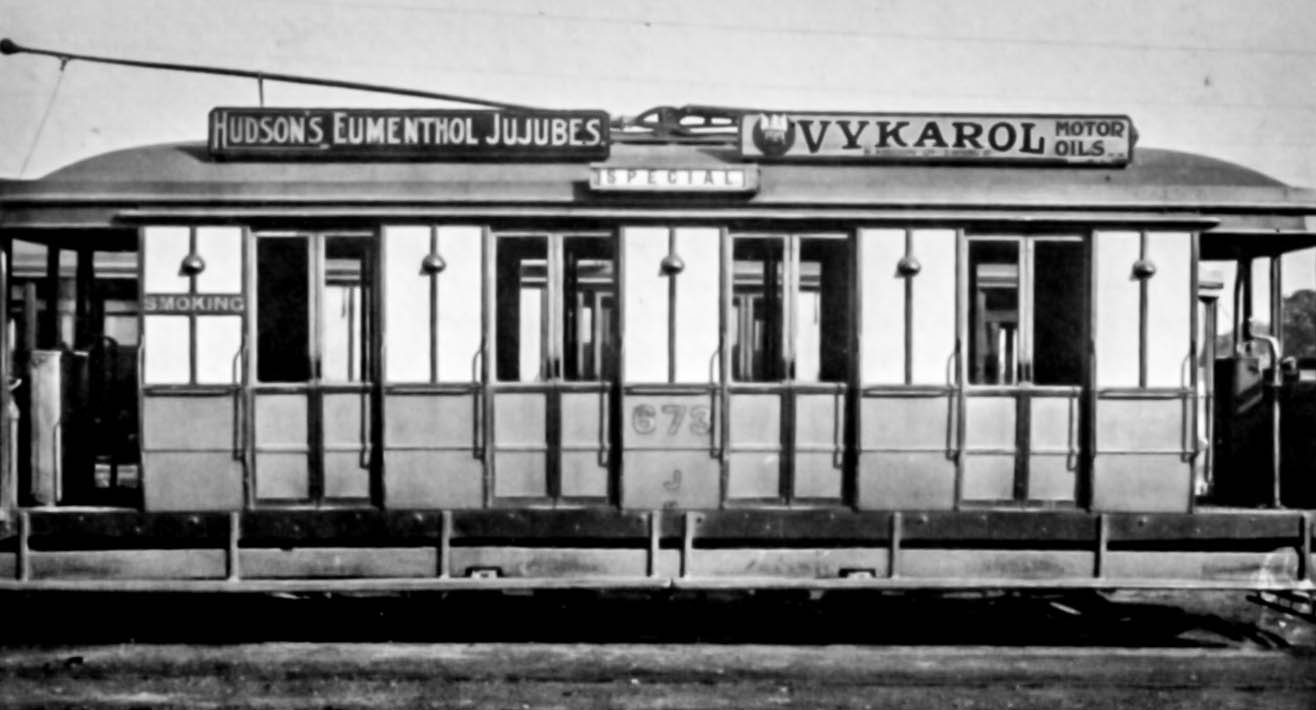
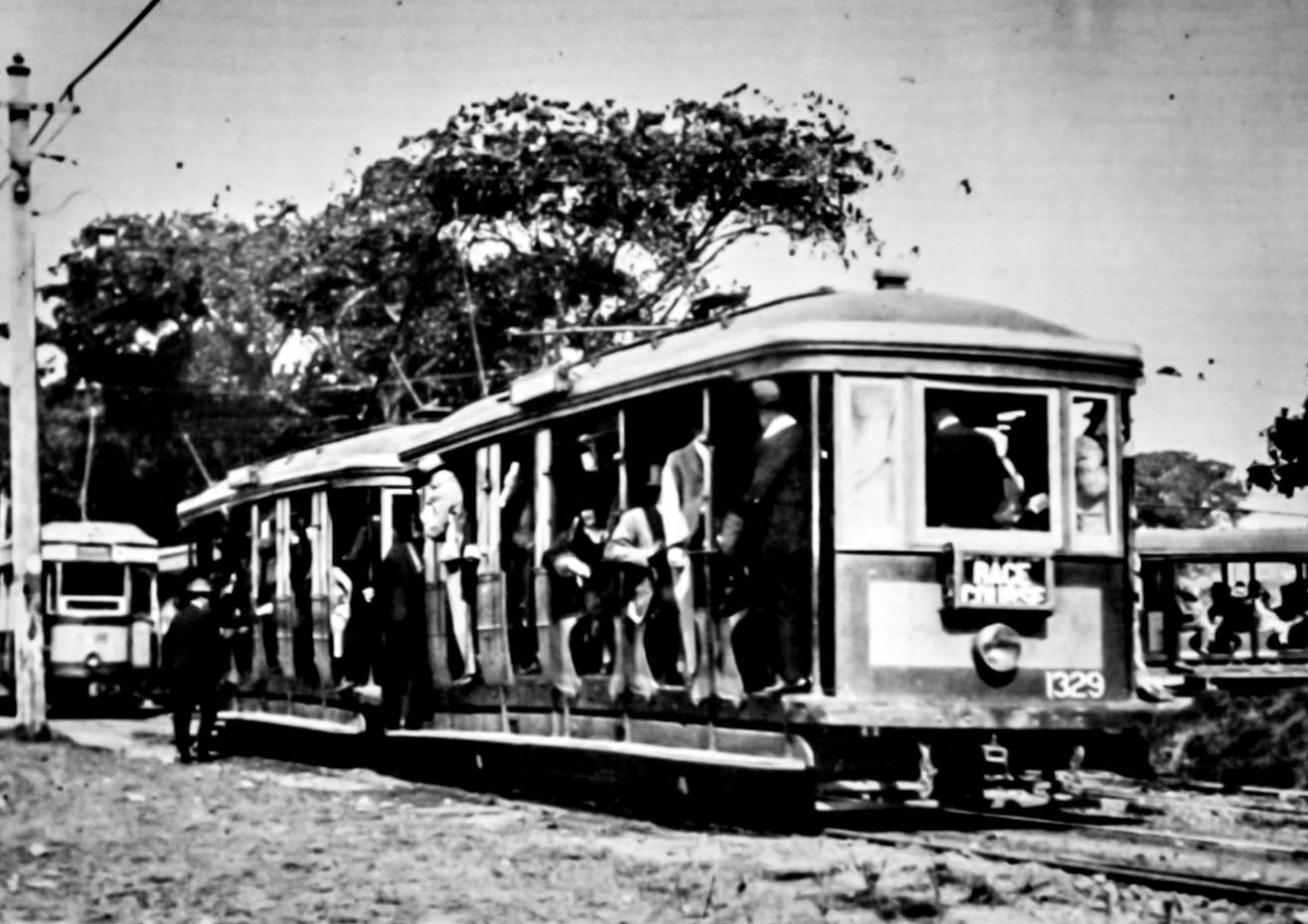
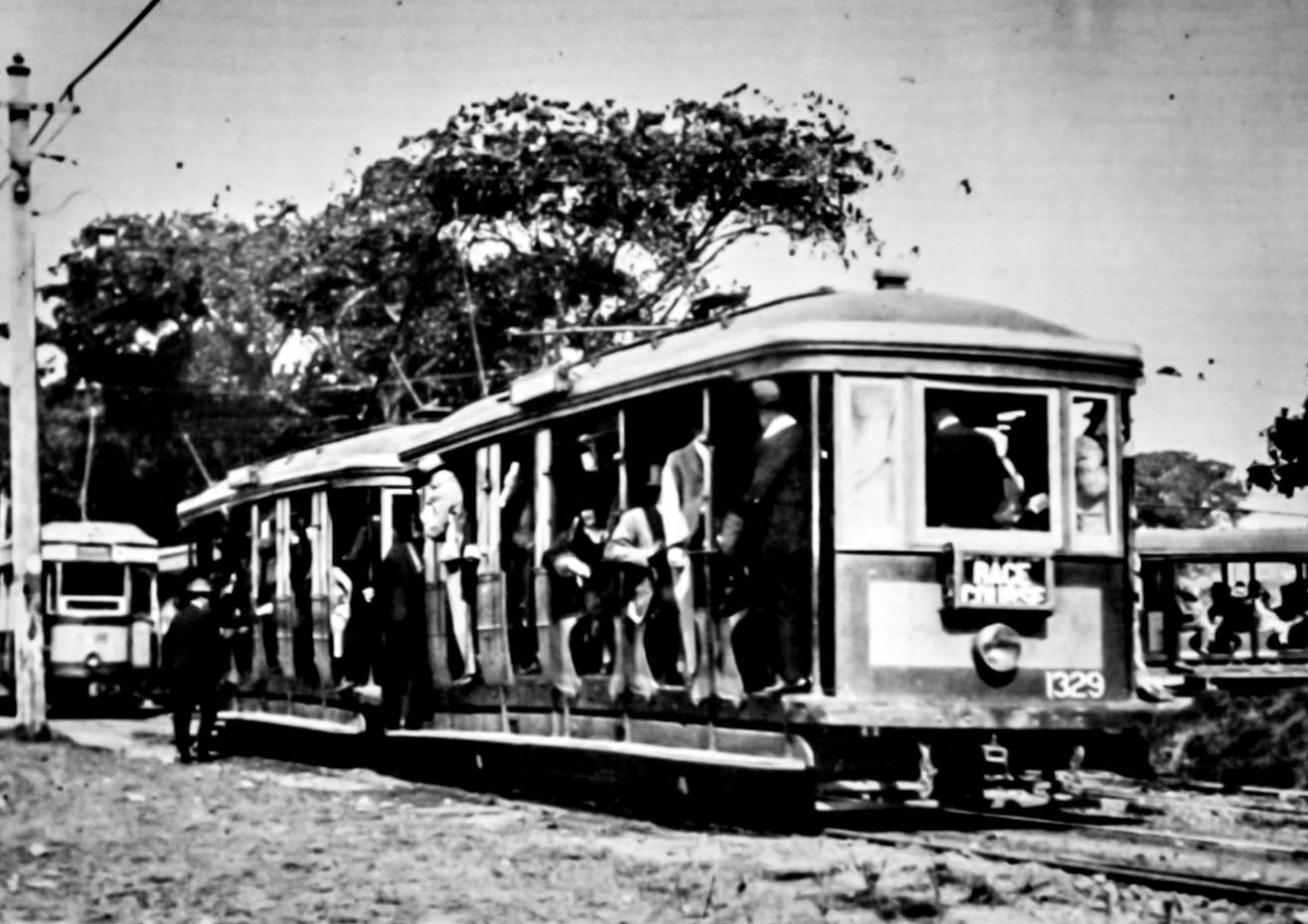
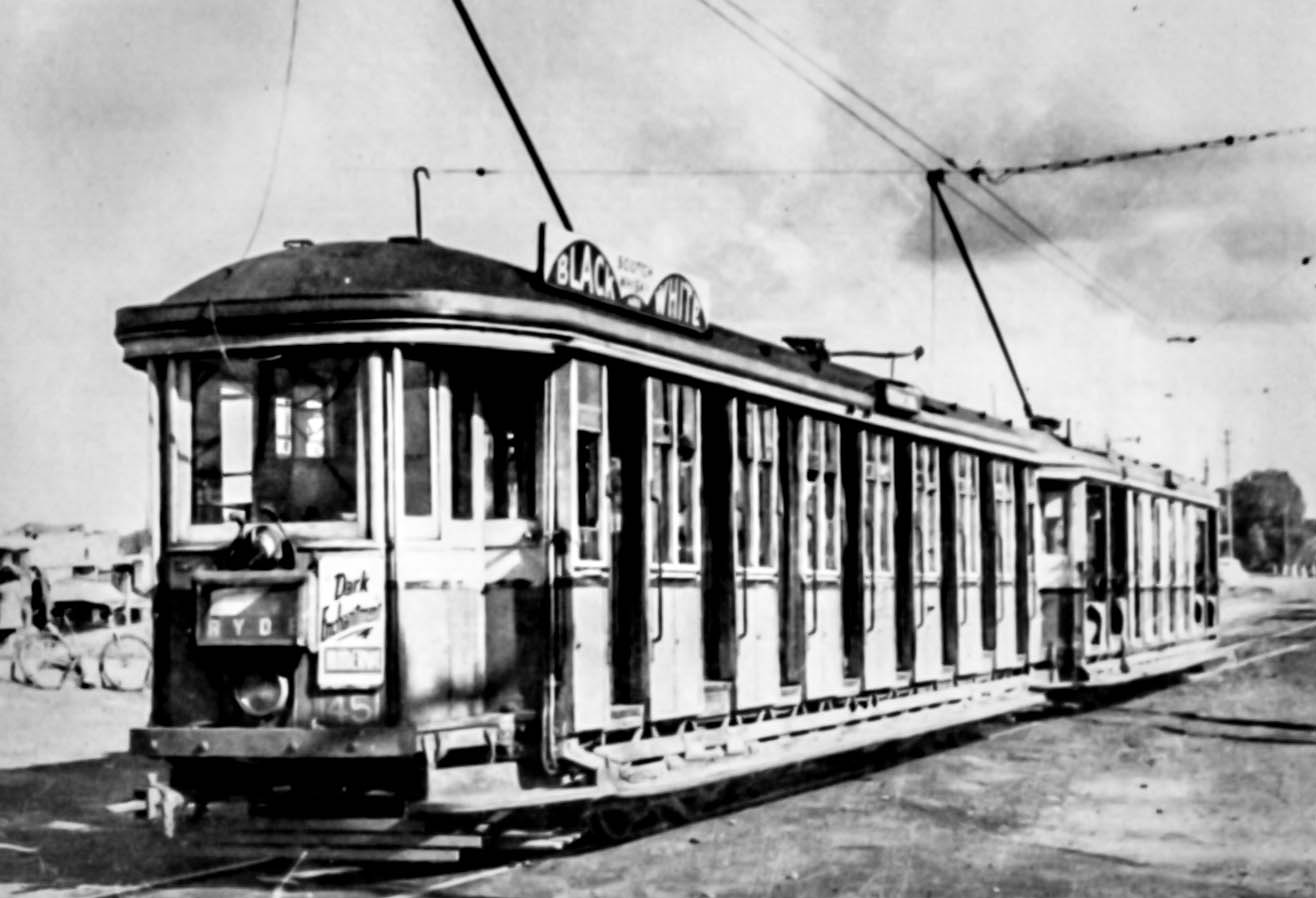
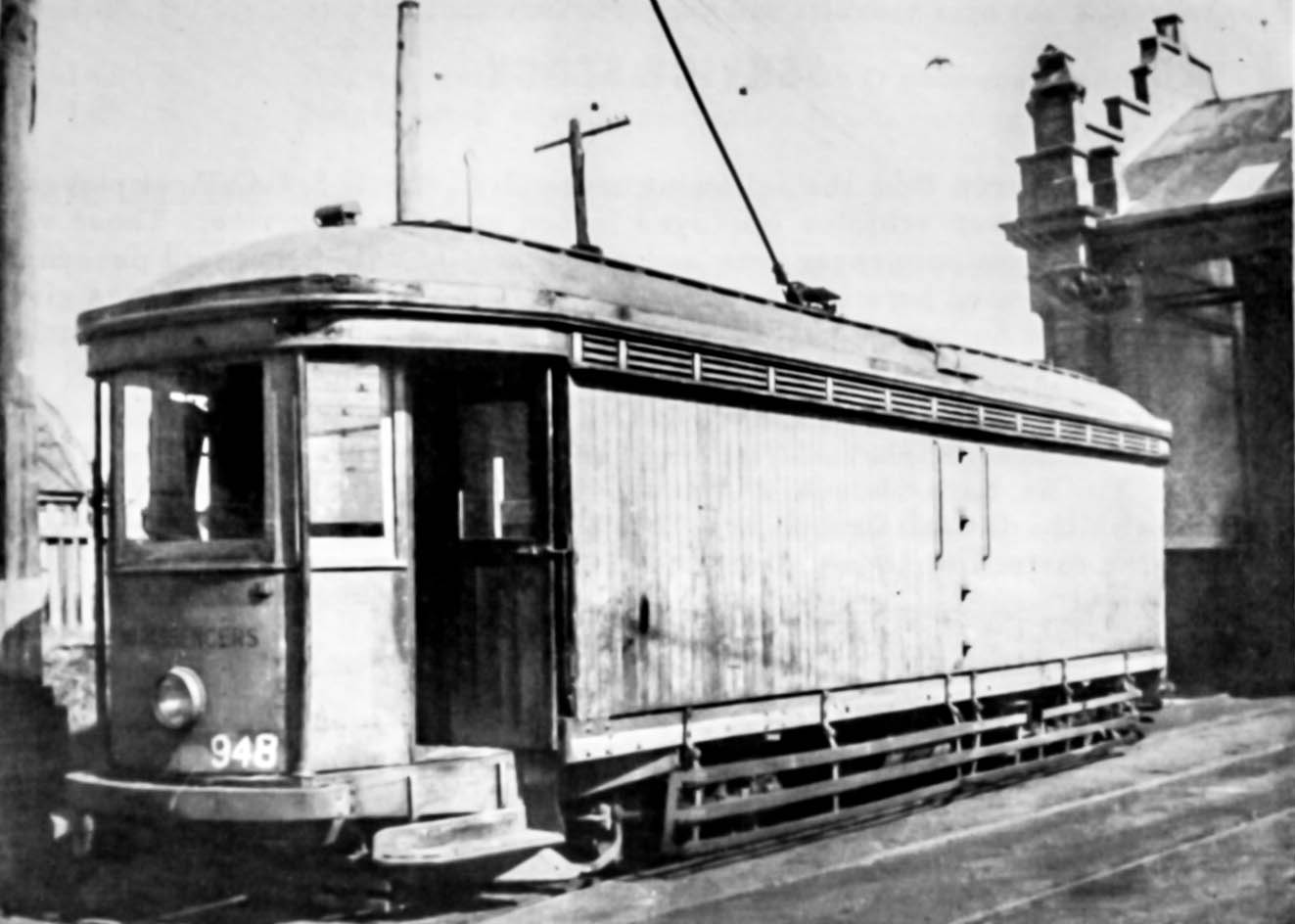
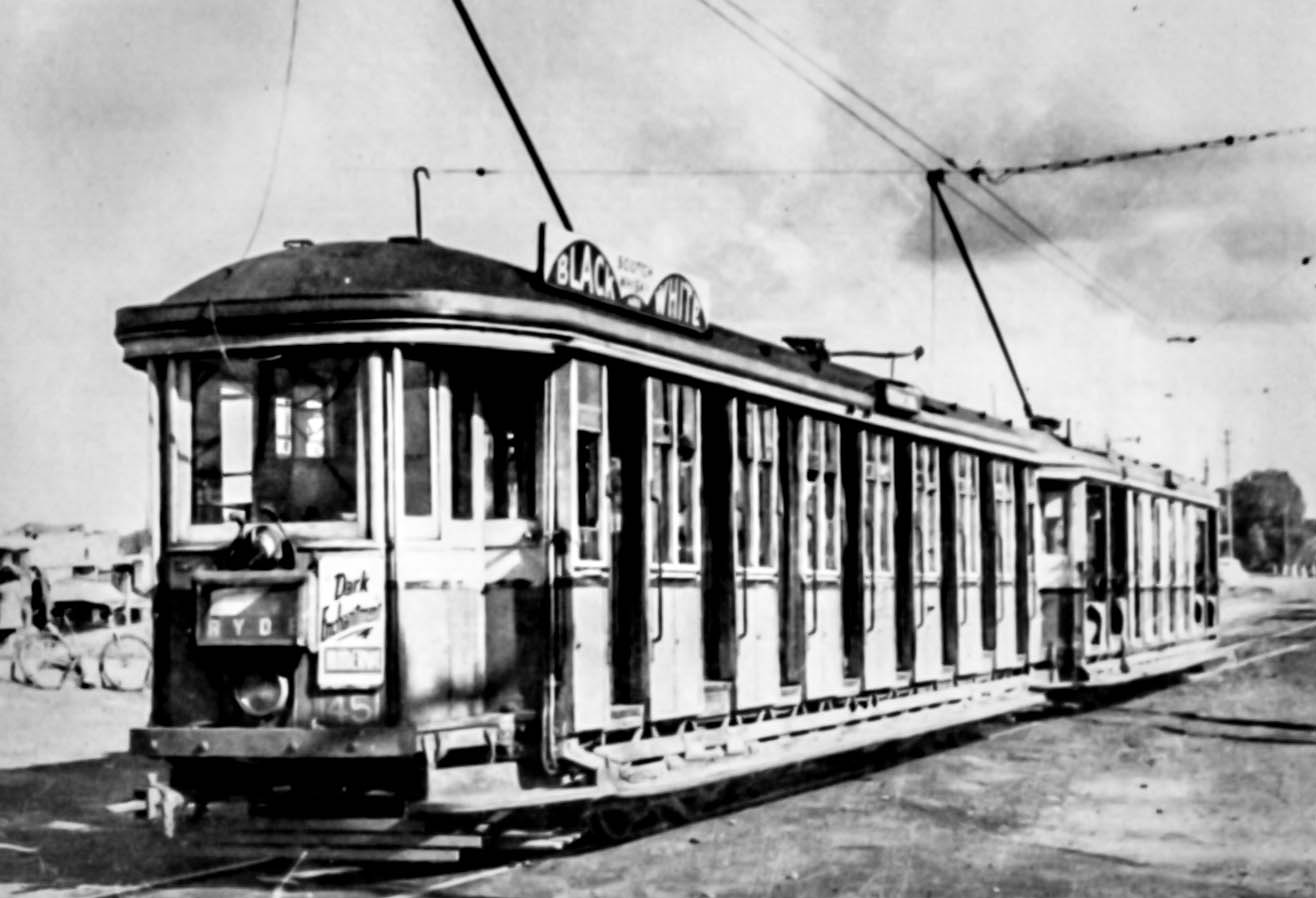
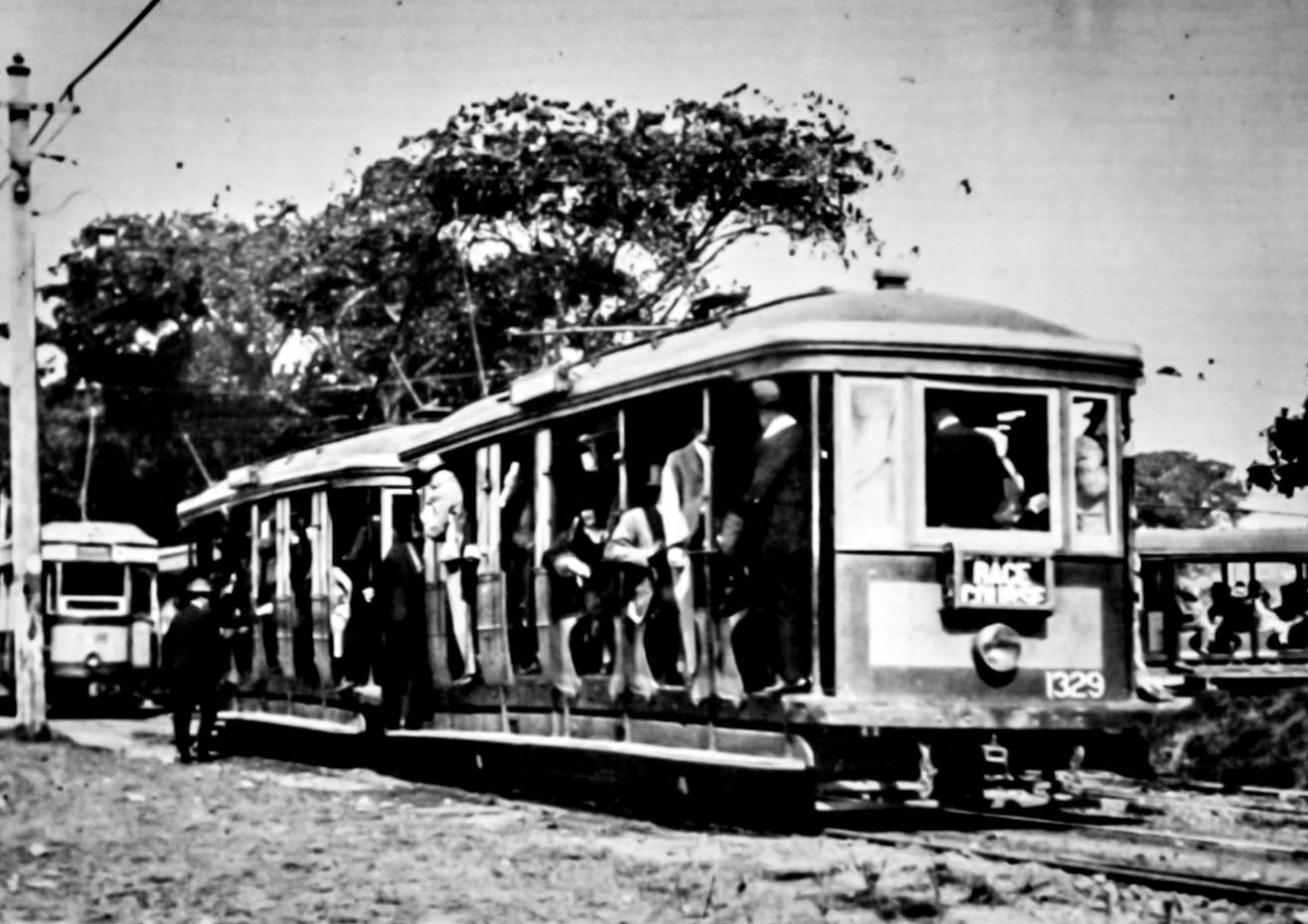
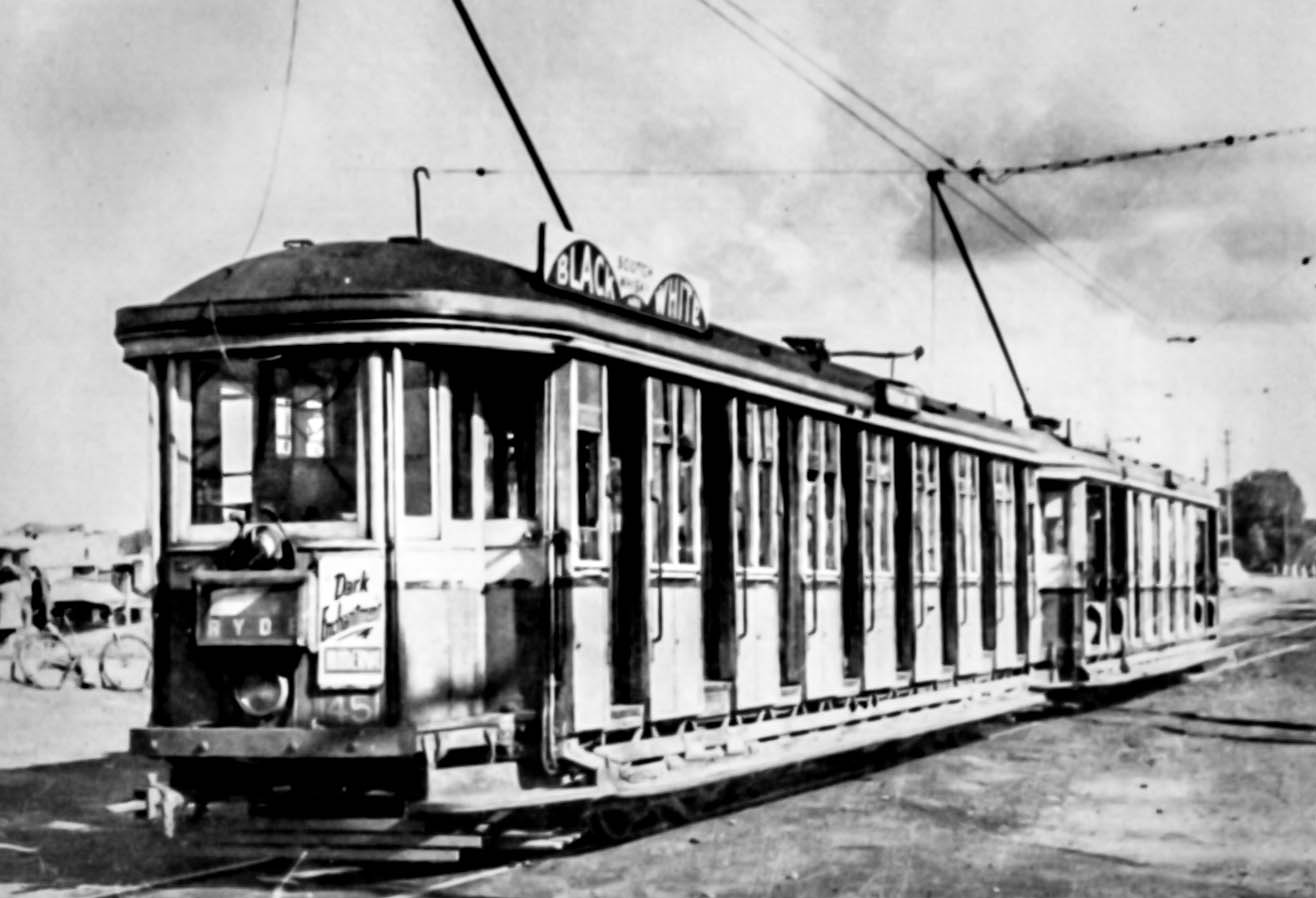
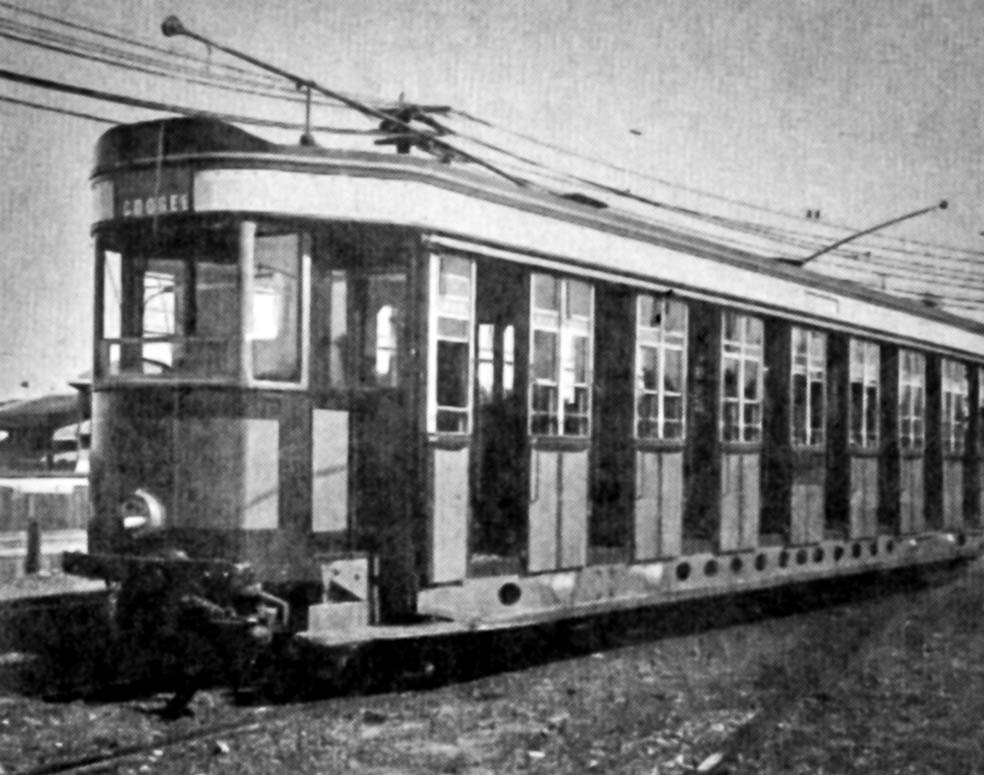
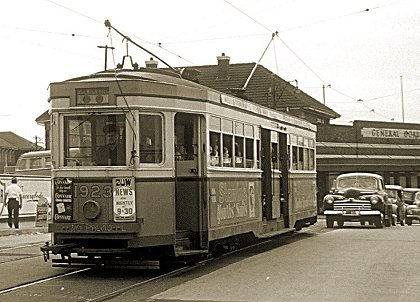
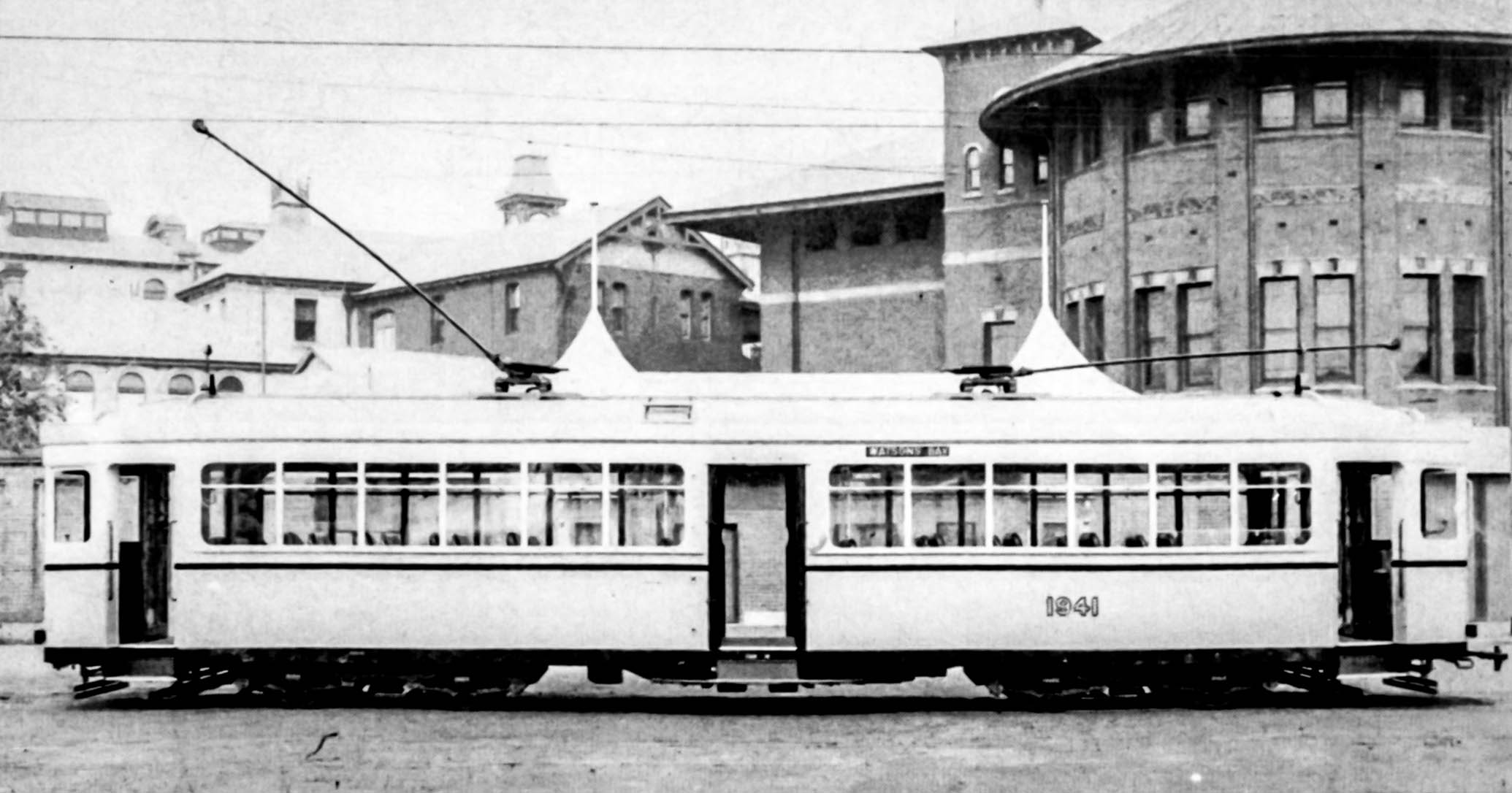
Car Numbers and Classification
Image	Numbers	Description	Class
	1-3	Sydney's first Electric trams used for trial electrification on Randwick-Waverley and Military Road, North Sydney. Single truck end loading saloon car	Experimental cars
	4-97	Single truck end loading saloon car	C-class (some T-class )
	98-121	Single truck, California combination, straight sill car	D-class
	122	Maximum traction bogie California combination car, with straight chassis sill and longitudinal exterior seats (converted to L class, and later LP)	F-class
	123	Single truck, California combination, straight sill car	D-class
	124-139	Maximum traction bogie, half saloon, half open cross bench cars, with straight chassis sill and permanently coupled back to back	G-class
	140-288	Maximum traction bogie California combination car, with straight chassis sill and longitudinal exterior seats (all cars converted to L class, and later LP)	F-class
	289-291	Single truck end loading saloon car	C-class
	292,293	ex-horse cars 199, 200	T-class
	294	Maximum traction bogie California combination car, with straight chassis sill and longitudinal exterior seats (converted to L class, and later LP)	F-class
	295	Enclosed cross bench Maximum traction bogie car, partial centre-aisle when built	N-class
	296-395	Maximum traction bogie California combination car, with straight chassis sill and longitudinal exterior seats (all cars altered to L class, and later LP, except No.393)	F-class
	396,397	Single truck closed cross bench car, single ended, permanently coupled back to back in pairs.	E-class
	398-412	Enclosed cross bench Maximum traction bogie car	N-class
	413 -612	Single truck closed cross bench car, single ended, permanently coupled back to back in pairs.	E-class
	613-647	Enclosed cross bench Maximum traction bogie car	N-class
	648-682	Single truck, closed cross bench car	J-class
	683	Enclosed cross bench Maximum traction bogie car (later Prison car N 948)	N-class
	684-728	Enclosed cross bench Maximum traction bogie car (No. 704 converted to LP class)	N-class
	729-736	ex-cable trailers	T-class
	737,738	Maximum traction bogie open cross bench car	M-class
	739,740	Single truck, open cross bench cars	H-class
	741- 745	Single truck, closed cross bench car	J-class
	746-802	Single truck cross bench, half open, half closed car	K-class
	803-805	Single truck cross bench, half open, half closed car (destroyed before delivery)	K-class
	803-947	Bogie cross bench, half open, half enclosed car (Nos. 855, 935, and 943 converted to O/P-Class)	O-class
	948	Prison car	N-class
	949-1279	Bogie cross bench, half open, half enclosed car (Nos. 961, 1007, 1089, 1170, and 1241 converted to O/P-class)	O-class
	1280-1329	Single truck cross bench, half open, half closed car	K-class
	1330-1479	Bogie cross bench, half open, half enclosed car (Nos. 1372, 1383, and 1451 converted to O/P-class)	O-class
	1480-1737	Bogie enclosed cross bench car (Nos. 1517, 1562, 1573, and 1582 converted to PR1-class, No. 1691 converted to PR-class)	P-class
	1738-1932	Front, centre and rear loading, bogie drop-centre saloon, divided into three compartments	R-class
	1933-2087	Front, centre and rear loading drop centre bogie saloon car central body bulkheads	R1-class
