= X2 class =

X2 class or Class X2 may refer to:

- X2-class Melbourne tram
- LSWR X2 class, 4-4-0 steam locomotives
