= G class Melbourne tram (1913) =

G-class
- Manufacturer: Duncan & Fraser
- Assembly: Adelaide
- Constructed: 1913
- Number built: 6
- Fleet numbers: 48-53
- Capacity: 52 (as built); 34 (as modified)

Specifications
- Car length: 9.43 m (30 ft 11 in)
- Width: 2.64 m (8 ft 8 in)
- Height: 3.27 m (10 ft 9 in)
- Weight: 11.8 t (11.6 long tons; 13.0 short tons)
- Traction system: AEG
- Traction motors: 2 × U140 33 kW (44 hp)
- Current collection: Trolley pole
- UIC classification: Bo′
- Bogies: JG Brill Company 21E
- Track gauge: 1,435 mm (4 ft 8 1/2 in) standard gauge

The G-class was a class of six trams built by Duncan & Fraser, Adelaide, for the Prahran & Malvern Tramways Trust (PMTT). All passed to the Melbourne & Metropolitan Tramways Board on 2 February 1920 when it took over the PMTT, becoming the G-class and retaining their running numbers. They were similar to the F-class but had arched rather than clerestory roofs.
