= J type =

J type or Type J may refer to:

- J-type asteroid
- MG J-type, a sports car
- Morris Commercial J-type, a van
- Renault J-Type engine
- Caudron Type J, an airplane
- Type J thermocouple, an electrical device
- Type J AC power plug, another name for Swiss National Standard SN 441011

== See also ==
- J class (disambiguation)
- Type J1 submarine
