= Fitzroy, Northcote & Preston Tramways Trust =

Australian tram operator

- Parent: Municipality of Fitzroy; Municipality of Northcote; Municipality of Preston
- Commenced operation: 3 August 1915
- Ceased operation: 1 February 1920
- Headquarters: Preston
- Service area: Melbourne
- Depots: 1
- Fleet: 8 R class trams

The Fitzroy, Northcote & Preston Tramways Trust was a tram operator in Melbourne, Australia.

== History ==
The Fitzroy, Northcote & Preston Tramways Trust (FNPTT) was established in August 1915 by Fitzroy, Northcote and Preston to operate an electric tramway from North Fitzroy north along St Georges Road to a junction at Miller Street, Preston where it split into two branches. One headed west along Miller Street and then turned north along Gilbert Road to terminate at Regent Street, West Preston. The other headed east along Miller Street, crossing over the Mernda railway line and then turned north along Plenty Road to terminate at Tyler Street, East Preston.

A trial run over the lines was conducted on 27 January 1920, however before operations commenced, the FNPTT was taken over by the Melbourne & Metropolitan Tramways Board (M&MTB) on 2 February 1920, with services commencing on 1 April 1920. The FNPTT lines remain open today being served by Yarra Trams routes 11 and 86.

== Rolling stock ==
Eight straight-sill California combination trams were ordered from James Moore & Sons and assembled by the Prahran & Malvern Tramways Trust's Malvern workshops. All were delivered in 1920 passing to the M&MTB as the R class.

== Depot ==
A four road depot was built at the junction of the two branch lines, on the north-western corner of the intersection between St Georges Road and Miller Street, Preston. Another five road shed built on the eastern side of the original building at a later date. The depot closed after the opening of East Preston tram depot in 1955, being used for storage of withdrawn trams and as an overflow area for Preston Workshops. After the latter opened in 1926, the former FNPTT depot was renamed Thornbury.
