= Q class Melbourne tram =

Type of tram in Melbourne, Australia

Q-class
- Manufacturer: Melbourne & Metropolitan Tramways Board
- Assembly: Holden Street Workshops
- Constructed: 1922/23
- Number built: 24
- Fleet numbers: 139-150, 190-201
- Capacity: 36 (as built); 28 (as modified)

Specifications
- Car length: 10.06 m (33 ft 0 in)
- Width: 2.73 m (8 ft 11 in)
- Wheel diameter: 838 mm (33.0 in)
- Wheelbase: 2.29 m (7 ft 6 in)
- Weight: 13.3 tonnes
- Current collection: Trolley pole
- Bogies: JG Brill Company 21E
- Track gauge: 1,435 mm (4 ft 8 1/2 in)

The Q-class was a class of 24 trams built by the Melbourne & Metropolitan Tramways Board (MMTB). They were built as part of the MMTB's plan to quickly increase the size of its fleet at its Holden Street Workshops. Twenty were rebuilt for use on all night services and in this role they travelled across the network.
