= R class Melbourne tram =

R-class
- Manufacturers: James Moore & Sons; Melbourne & Metropolitan Tramways Board
- Assembly: South Melbourne; Holden Street Workshops
- Constructed: 1920
- Number built: 8
- Fleet numbers: 151-153, 172-176
- Capacity: 28

Specifications
- Car length: 10.06 m (33 ft 0 in)
- Width: 2.73 m (8 ft 11 in)
- Height: 3.27 m (10 ft 9 in)
- Wheel diameter: 838 mm (33.0 in)
- Wheelbase: 2.29 m (7 ft 6 in)
- Weight: 11.7 tonnes
- Current collection: Trolley pole
- Bogies: JG Brill Company 21E
- Track gauge: 1,435 mm (4 ft 8 1/2 in)

The R-class was a class of eight trams built by James Moore & Sons and the Melbourne & Metropolitan Tramways Board (MMTB). The Fitzroy, Northcote & Preston Tramways Trust (FNPTT) placed five trams in service in 1920. All passed to the MMTB on 2 February 1920 when it took over the FNPTT becoming the R-class and being renumbered 172-176.

In 1936, 152 and 153 were sold for further use on the Ballarat and Bendigo networks respectively. Numbers 151, 174-176 were rebuilt to operate all night services in 1937 and in this role travelled across the network. They were withdrawn after all night services ceased in 1957.
