= X2 class Melbourne tram =

X2-class
- Manufacturer: Melbourne & Metropolitan Tramways Board
- Constructed: 1930
- Number built: 6
- Fleet numbers: 675-680
- Capacity: 32

Specifications
- Car length: 10.00 m (32 ft 10 in)
- Width: 2.64 m (8 ft 8 in)
- Height: 3.10 m (10 ft 2 in)
- Wheel diameter: 838 mm (33.0 in)
- Wheelbase: 3.05 m (10 ft 0 in)
- Weight: 10.7 t (24,000 lb)
- Current collection: Trolley pole
- Bogies: JG Brill Company 21E
- Track gauge: 1,435 mm (4 ft 8 1/2 in)

The X2-class was a class of six trams built by the Melbourne & Metropolitan Tramways Board. Developed from the X1-class, they differed in having larger wheels, angled windshields and only two doors.

Originally numbered 674-679, 674 was renumbered 680 in 1934 to allow the W4-class to be numbered consecutively. They were mainly used on Point Ormond line and the isolated Footscray network. With the closure of these two lines in the early 1960s, all were withdrawn.

== Preservation ==
Two have been preserved:

- 676 as part of the VicTrack heritage fleet at Hawthorn depot
- 680 by the Tramway Museum Society of Victoria
