= A class Melbourne tram (1910) =

A-class
- Manufacturer: Duncan & Fraser
- Assembly: Adelaide
- Constructed: 1910/11
- Number built: 20
- Fleet numbers: 1-20
- Capacity: 36

Specifications
- Car length: 9.43 m (30 ft 11 in)
- Height: 3.25 m (10 ft 8 in)
- Wheel diameter: 838 mm (33.0 in)
- Wheelbase: 1.98 m (6 ft 6 in)
- Weight: 12.1 tons
- Current collection: Trolley pole
- Bogies: JG Brill Company 21E
- Track gauge: 1,435 mm (4 ft 8 1/2 in)

The A-class was a class of 20 trams built by Duncan & Fraser, Adelaide for the Prahran & Malvern Tramways Trust (PMTT). All passed to the Melbourne & Metropolitan Tramways Board on 2 February 1920 when it took over the PMTT becoming the A-class retaining their running numbers.

Fourteen were transferred to the isolated Footscray network in 1923/24. Three were converted to non-passenger use in 1925–27. The others were withdrawn in 1928–31.
