= K-class Sydney tram =

K-class
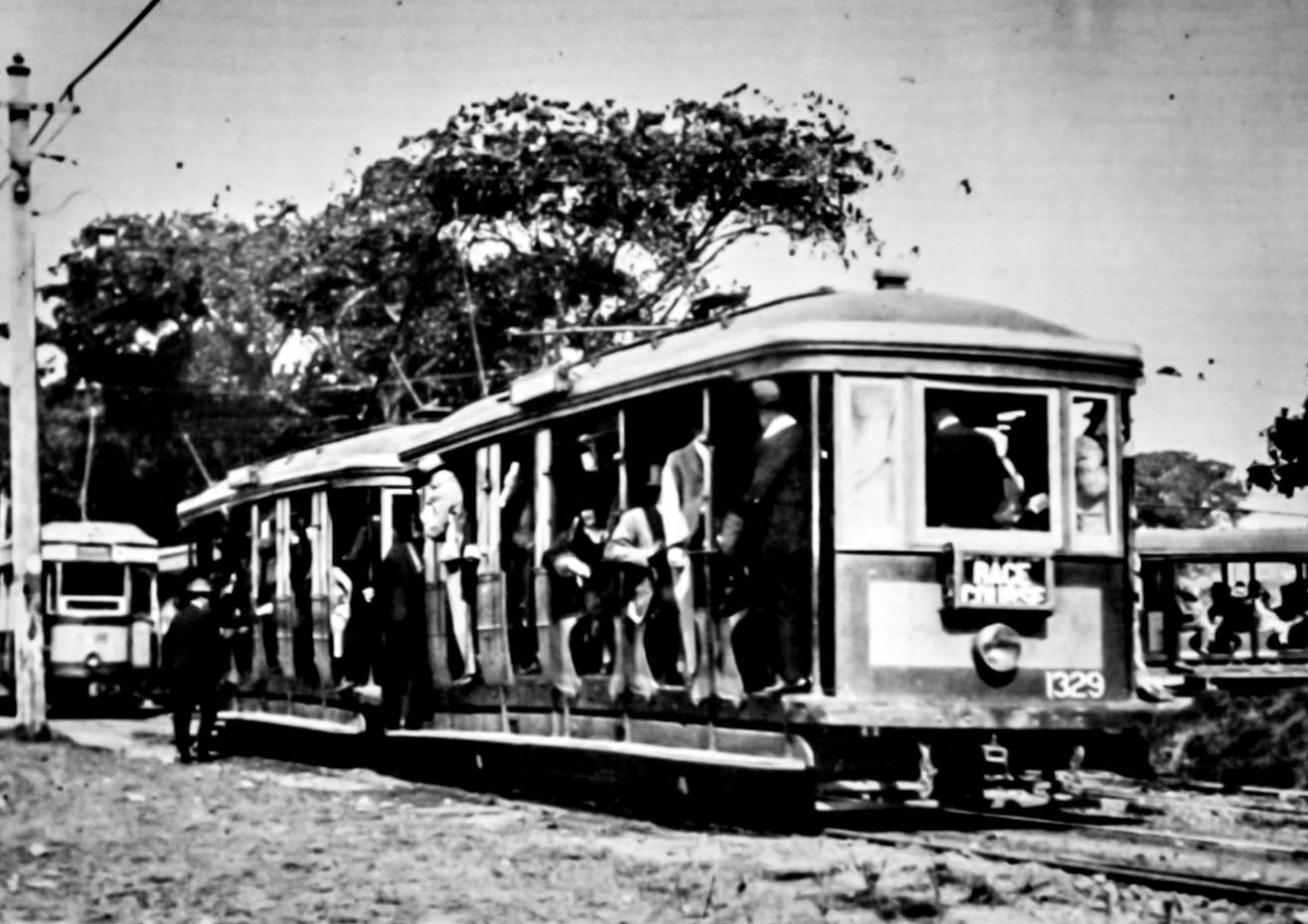
- K class at Randwick Racecourse
- Manufacturer: Meadowbank Manufacturing Company
- Constructed: 1908-13
- Number built: 107
- Fleet numbers: 746-802, 1280-1329
- Capacity: 50 (Seated)

Specifications
- Train length: 29 ft 2 in (8.89 m)
- Height: 12 ft 1.5 in (3.70 m)
- Maximum speed: 60 km/h
- Weight: 10.68 long tons (10.9 t)
- Power output: 4 x 48 hp (later 50)
- Electric system(s): 600 V DC catenary
- Current collection: Trolley pole
- Track gauge: 1,435 mm (4 ft 8 1/2 in)

The K-class trams are a single truck all crossbench design, with closed compartments at one end and open seating at the other operated on the Sydney tram network. Withdrawals commenced in 1939. By 1949, only 1295 and 1296 remained in service on the Neutral Bay line, being withdrawn in the mid-1950s. Two were sold as track scrubbers in 1959 to Melbourne.

== Preservation ==
Two have been preserved: Nos. 1295 and 1296 were preserved at the Sydney Tramway Museum. However, 1295 was destroyed by fire during a vandalism attack in 2016.
