= F class Melbourne tram =

F-class
- Manufacturer: Duncan & Fraser
- Assembly: Adelaide
- Constructed: 1912
- Number built: 2
- Fleet numbers: 46-47
- Capacity: 52 (as built); 36 (as modified)

Specifications
- Car length: 9.75 m (32 ft 0 in)
- Width: 2.64 m (8 ft 8 in)
- Height: 3.43 m (11 ft 3 in)
- Wheel diameter: 838 mm (33.0 in)
- Weight: 11.6 t (11.4 long tons; 12.8 short tons)
- Traction system: Westinghouse T1F
- Traction motors: 2 × Westinghouse 205 25 kW (34 hp)
- Current collection: Trolley pole
- UIC classification: Bo′
- Bogies: JG Brill Company 21E
- Track gauge: 1,435 mm (4 ft 8 1/2 in) standard gauge

The F-class was a class of two trams built by Duncan & Fraser, Adelaide, for the Prahran & Malvern Tramways Trust (PMTT). Both passed to the Melbourne & Metropolitan Tramways Board on 2 February 1920 when it took over the PMTT, becoming the F-class and retaining their running numbers. They were designed as summer cars, with five doors on each side. When rebuilt in 1923, some of the doors were filled in and longitudinal seating was fitted.
