= K class Melbourne tram =

K-class
- Manufacturers: James Moore & Sons
- Assembly: South Melbourne
- Constructed: 1919/20
- Number built: 9
- Fleet numbers: 92-100
- Capacity: 34

Specifications
- Car length: 10.06 m (33 ft 0 in)
- Width: 2.73 m (8 ft 11 in)
- Height: 3.33 m (10 ft 11 in)
- Wheel diameter: 838 mm (33.0 in)
- Weight: 13.1 tonnes
- Current collection: Trolley pole
- Bogies: JG Brill Company 21E
- Track gauge: 1,435 mm (4 ft 8 1/2 in)

The K-class was a class of nine trams built by James Moore & Sons for the Prahran & Malvern Tramways Trust (PMTT). All passed to the Melbourne & Metropolitan Tramways Board on 2 February 1920 when it took over the PMTT becoming the K-class retaining their running numbers.
