= J class Melbourne tram =

J-class
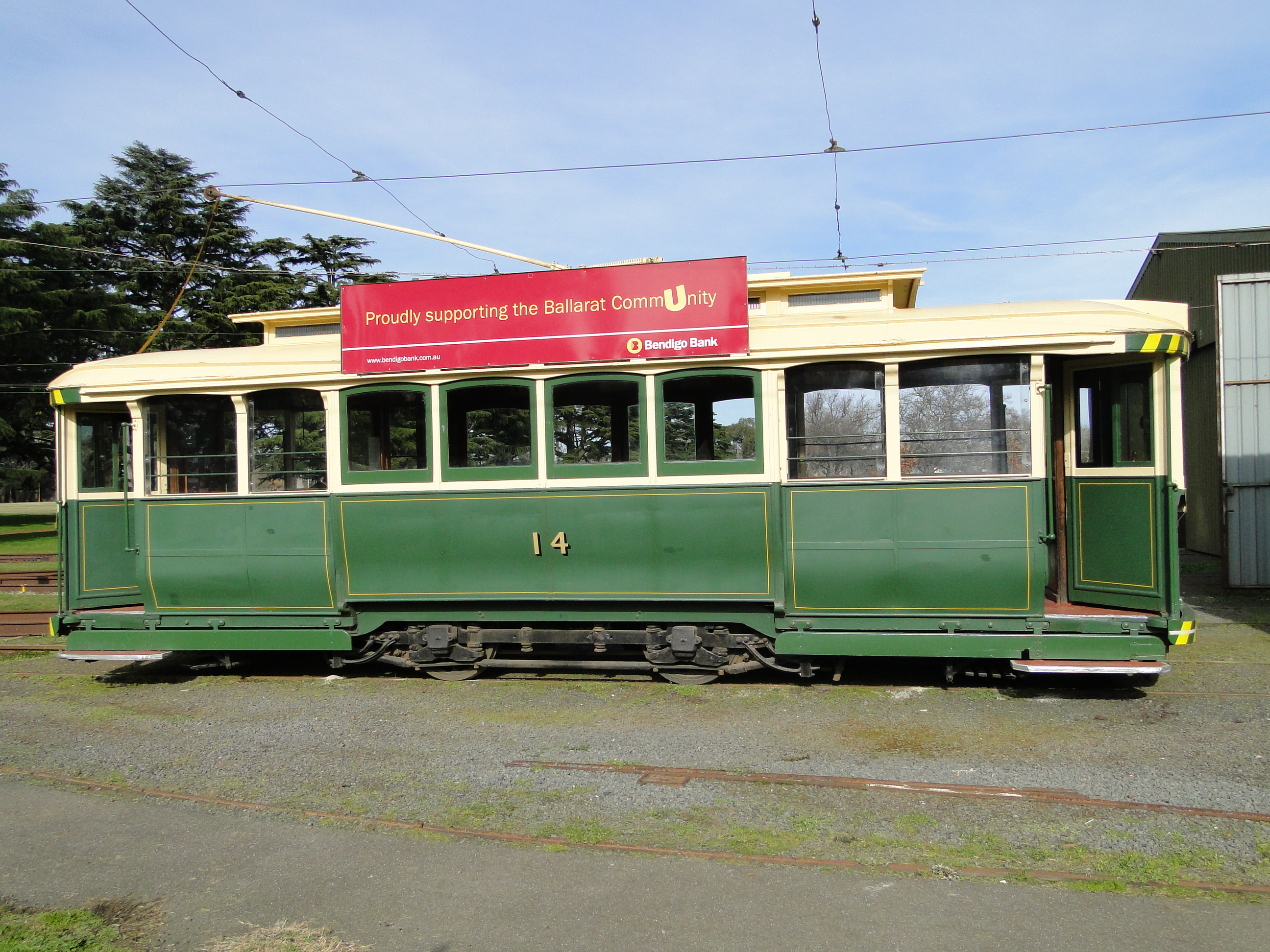
- Manufacturer: Meadowbank Manufacturing Company
- Assembly: Sydney
- Constructed: 1915
- Number built: 20
- Fleet numbers: 64-83
- Capacity: 36

Specifications
- Car length: 9.43 m (30 ft 11 in)
- Width: 2.72 m (8 ft 11 in)
- Height: 3.25 m (10 ft 8 in)
- Wheel diameter: 838 mm (33.0 in)
- Weight: 12.3 tonnes
- Current collection: Trolley pole
- Bogies: JG Brill Company 21E
- Track gauge: 1,435 mm (4 ft 8 1/2 in)

The J-class was a Melbourne tram classification of twenty trams built by the Meadowbank Manufacturing Company, Sydney for the Prahran & Malvern Tramways Trust (PMTT). J-class trams were single truck, open California combination cars.

All passed to the Melbourne & Metropolitan Tramways Board on 2 February 1920 when it took over the PMTT becoming the J-class retaining their running numbers.

In 1928, seven (64-68, 71 and 75) were sold to the Melbourne Electric Supply Company for use on the Geelong network. In 1931, 73, 76 and 82 were sold to Ballarat and 79 and 83 renumbered 14 and 13 to Bendigo. After the Geelong network closed in 1956, 64-68 and 71 moved to Ballarat. As part of a Museum Collection number 14 Pictured above

== Preservation ==
Five have been preserved:

- 68 by the Ballarat Tramway Museum as Ballarat number 13
- 71 by the Sydney Tramway Museum as Ballarat number 12
- 73 by the Tramway Museum Society of Victoria as Ballarat number 17
- 75 by the Ballarat Tramway Museum as Ballarat number 14
- 76 by the Bendigo Tramway as Bendigo number 7
