= X1 class Melbourne tram =

X1-class
- Manufacturer: Melbourne & Metropolitan Tramways Board
- Constructed: 1926–1928
- Number built: 10
- Fleet numbers: 459–468
- Capacity: 32

Specifications
- Car length: 9.45 m (31 ft 0 in)
- Width: 2.56 m (8 ft 5 in)
- Height: 3.05 m (10 ft 0 in)
- Wheel diameter: 673 mm (26.5 in)
- Wheelbase: 3.05 m (10 ft 0 in)
- Weight: 10.4 t (23,000 lb)
- Current collection: Trolley pole
- Bogies: JG Brill Company 21E
- Track gauge: 1,435 mm (4 ft 8 1/2 in)

The X1-class was a class of ten trams built by the Melbourne & Metropolitan Tramways Board. Developed from the X-class, they differed in having four doors. They were initially allocated to Glenhuntly and Hawthorn depots. Six were transferred to the isolated Footscray network In June 1928 with the other four following in June 1929.

Originally they were overhauled at Footscray depot, but from 1949 they were transferred by road to Preston Workshops. Between 1954 and 1957 they operated all night services on the main system.

== Preservation ==
Four have been preserved:

- 461 by the Walhalla Goldfields Railway
- 463 by the Walhalla Goldfields Railway
- 466 by the Auckland Dockline Tram
- 467 by the Tramway Museum Society of Victoria

The two examples at the Walhalla Goldfields Railway are to be rebuilt and converted to narrow-gauge (2 ft 6 in (762 mm)). 461 will form the basis for a new railmotor for tourist traffic, with 463 (which is in worse condition) potentially to be rebuilt as a trailer carriage.
