= J-class Sydney tram =

J-class
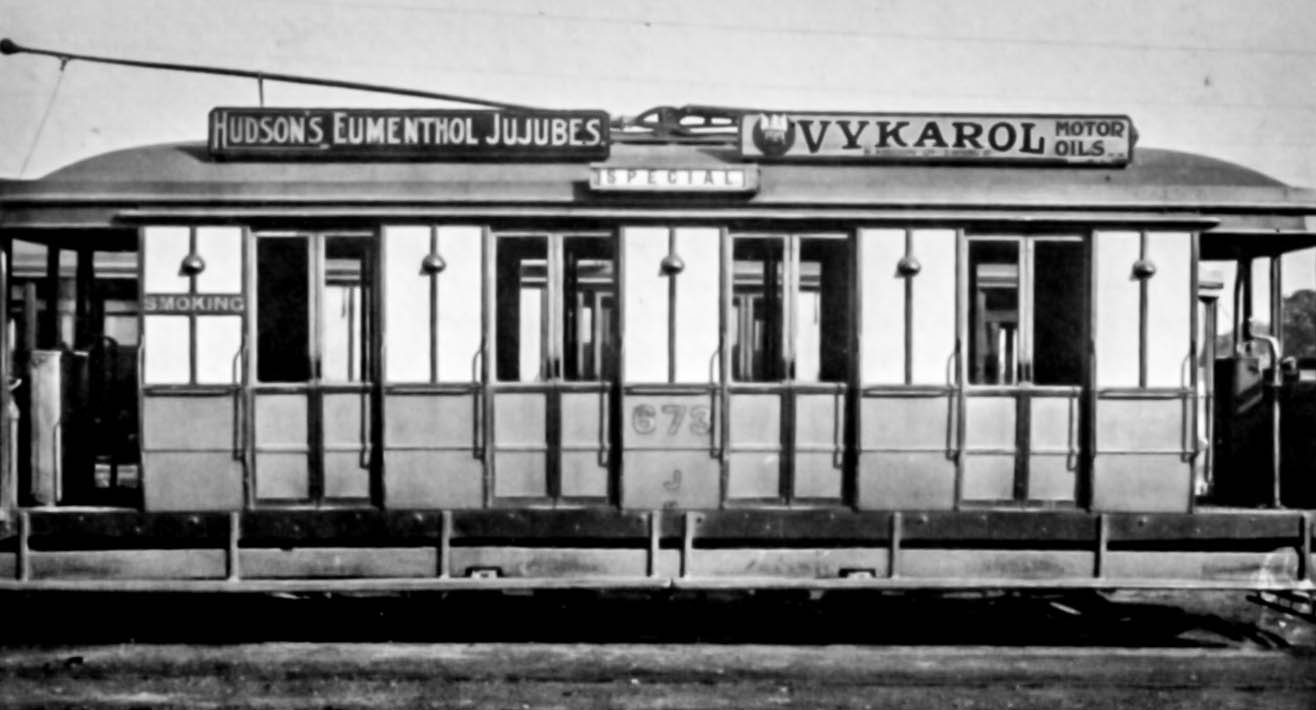
- Manufacturer: Meadowbank Manufacturing Company; E Chambers
- Constructed: 1904-08
- Number built: 47
- Fleet numbers: 23, 25, 38, 39, 98, 101, 648-682, 741-745

Specifications
- Train length: 29 ft 2 in (8.89 m)
- Height: 12 ft 1.5 in (3.70 m)
- Maximum speed: 60 km/h
- Weight: 11.4 long tons (11.6 t)
- Power output: 2 x 48 hp (later 60)
- Electric system(s): 600 V DC catenary
- Current collector(s): Trolley Pole
- Track gauge: 1,435 mm (4 ft 8 1/2 in)

The J-class trams were built as replacements for the King Street to Ocean Street, Edgecliff cable line designed to provide a frequent schedule, but with a lower seating capacity. Some briefly operated on the Manly lines in 1911. Withdrawals commenced in 1934 with the entry of the R Class trams, with all out of service by 1936.

== Preservation ==
One example has been preserved:

- 675 at the Sydney Tramway Museum
