= Astoria Riverfront Trolley =

Heritage streetcar line in Oregon

Coordinates: 46°11′25.4″N 123°49′53.6″W

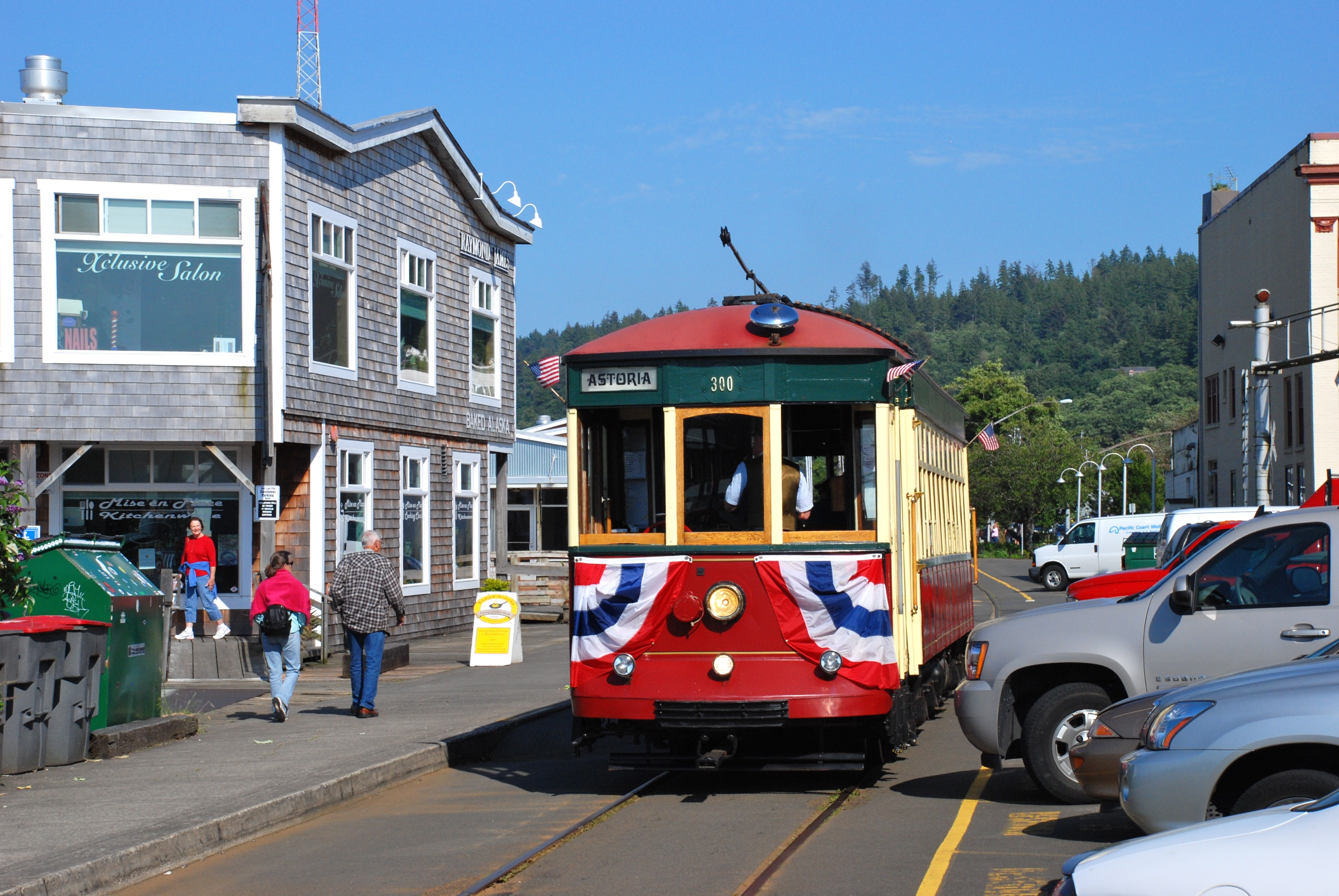
- Car 300 passing through the north end of downtown Astoria in 2012

Overview
- Status: Operating
- Locale: Astoria, Oregon, United States
- Termini: West End Mooring Basin/Astoria Riverwalk Inn; East End Mooring Basin (39th Street)

Service
- Type: Heritage streetcar (tram); seasonal operation
- Operator: Astoria Riverfront Trolley Association
- Ridership: Approx. 35,000–40,000 per season

History
- Opened: 1999

Technical
- Line length: 3 miles (5 km)
- Number of tracks: 1
- Track gauge: 4 ft 8 1/2 in (1,435 mm)
- Electrification: None; electricity supplied by portable diesel generator or rechargeable battery

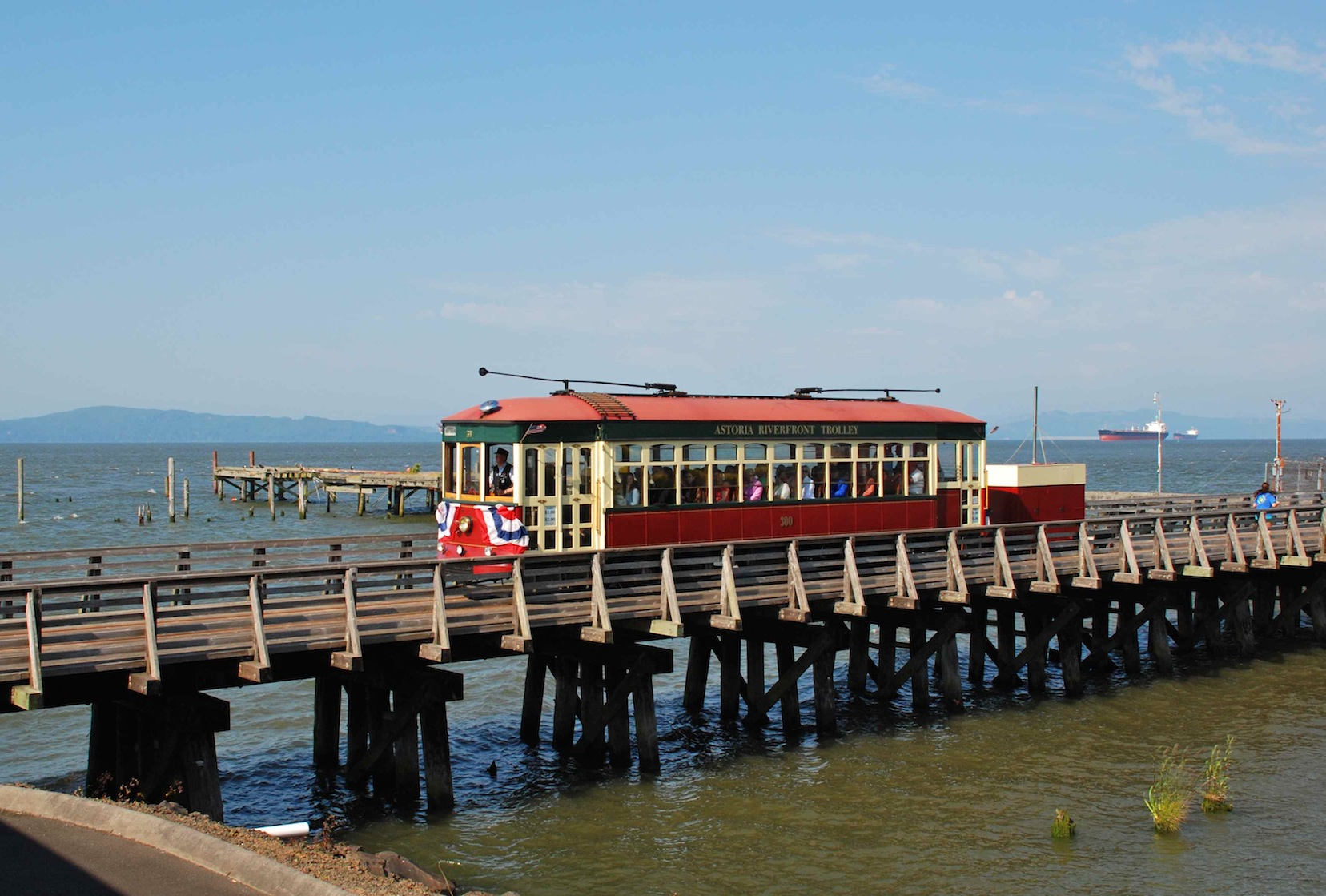
The line includes a few short trestles over minor inlets of the Columbia River.

The Astoria Riverfront Trolley is a 3-mile (4.8 km) heritage streetcar line that operates in Astoria, Oregon, United States, using former freight railroad tracks along or near the south bank of the Columbia River, with no overhead line. The service began operating in 1999, using a 1913-built streetcar from San Antonio, Texas. As of 2012, the service was reported as carrying 35,000 to 40,000 passengers per year and has been called a "symbol" and "icon" of Astoria. The line's operation is seasonal, normally during spring break and from May through September.

Volunteers from the non-profit Astoria Riverfront Trolley Association (ARTA) operate the service and maintain the streetcar and tracks, but the city of Astoria has provided some funds for certain purchases, including a new carbarn in 2001 and a contribution to the cost of purchasing the streetcar. The car was on loan from San Antonio for the first seven years, but was purchased by ARTA in August 2005. By 2004, the Trolley had become "one of Astoria's most popular features" and "a main attraction in the city of Astoria".

== Pre-opening history ==
The idea of creating a heritage streetcar system in Astoria, as part of efforts to redevelop and revitalize the riverfront area, had first been raised in 1980, long after the closure of the city's streetcar-transit system, which operated from 1892 to 1924. An attempt by city officials to acquire a trolley car in 1986 was dropped in the face of high insurance costs.

When Burlington Northern abandoned its freight railroad line from Portland to Astoria in 1996, the city of Astoria purchased about 6 miles (10 km) of BN right-of-way and track in and around downtown Astoria for possible future use, an action known as "railbanking". The remaining 92-mile (148 km) section of the Portland–Astoria line was sold by BN to the Portland and Western Railroad in 1997 and kept intact. After Astoria officials learned that a genuine vintage streetcar already in Oregon was not in use and was available for possible lease, they approached its owners and negotiated a five-year lease. The car was ex-San Antonio Public Service Company No. 300 and was owned by the San Antonio Museum of Art, but had been in Oregon since 1990 and had been used on the Willamette Shore Trolley line, in Portland, from 1990 through 1994. In November 1998, Astoria mayor Willis Van Dusen signed the five-year lease, which specified a rent of just $1 per year, and car 300 was moved to Astoria the following month. Since 1995, it had been stored in a closed museum near Gales Creek, Oregon, known as the Trolley Park (and formally as the Oregon Electric Railway Museum until that museum moved in 1996). Although the car had been in regular use until fewer than four years earlier, it had been stored outdoors since that time and was now in need of extensive restoration work.

After raising $40,000 in donations, volunteers refurbished car 300 and repainted it from the yellow paint scheme it had worn in Portland (inherited from San Antonio) to a new red-and-green livery, with "Astoria Riverfront Trolley" lettered along the side, above the windows. To avoid the expense of installing trolley wire and associated support poles and electrical substations, the electric motors of the trolley are powered by a diesel generator mounted on a trailer that the car pulls when westbound and pushes when eastbound, the same arrangement that car 300 had used when running on the Willamette Shore Trolley.

== Route and service ==
Service was inaugurated on June 8, 1999, on a 2.7-mile (4.3 km) route from Portway Street to 36th Street. The principal boarding location was at the Columbia River Maritime Museum (at 17th Street and approximately the middle of the route), and initially there were no other set stops. Several designated stops were added later, and some of these include a bench and small shelter. Passengers are still permitted to flag-down the trolley in between the posted stops.

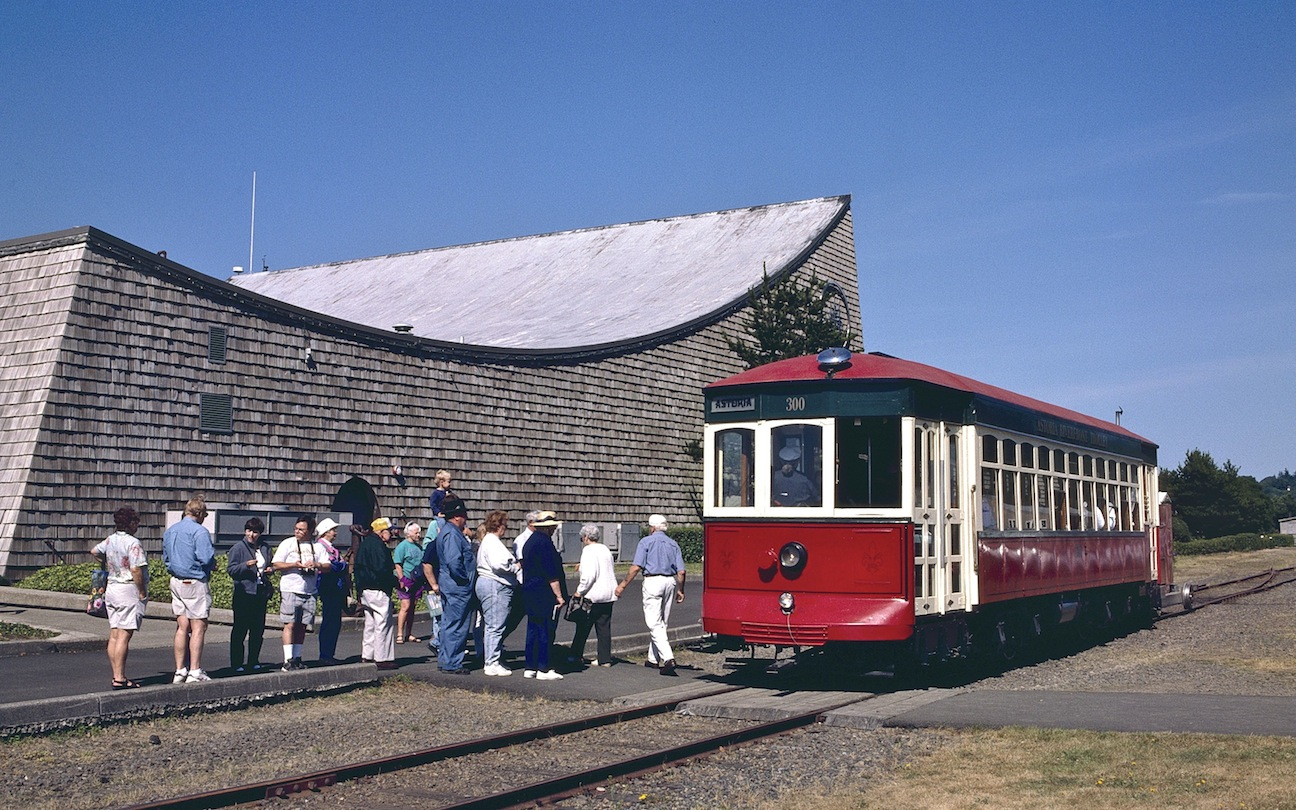
Passengers boarding car 300 at the Columbia River Maritime Museum during the first season of operation, in 1999

The route runs parallel to the Columbia River's bank, and the river is visible most of the way. In a few places, the tracks are carried on low trestles over the water. The line passes through the National Register of Historic Places-listed Downtown Historic District, and its westernmost section passes under the Astoria–Megler Bridge. To the east of the Maritime Museum, at 20th Street, it passes a former Spokane, Portland and Seattle Railway depot built in 1924. The fare has always been $1, with an all-day pass available for $2. Around 2006, operation was extended east from 36th Street to 39th Street, making the line about 3 miles (5 km) long.

During the first few years, the line operated from March or April through December, daily in summer months and otherwise Fridays through Sundays. Since about 2005, it has typically run daily from May through September, and sometimes also during spring break. Hours of operation are noon to 6 p.m. daily, Memorial Day to Labor Day, with more limited dates and hours in late spring and early fall. A round trip takes about 60 minutes. The car makes a trip approximately once an hour in each direction, but there is no exact schedule. Volunteers from the trolley association operate the car, with a two-person crew consisting of a motorman and a conductor. Boarding takes place at the rear door, where the conductor assists people in boarding, collects fares and identifies sights along the route while talking about the city's history.

The trolley line has been credited by local officials with being instrumental in bringing about redevelopment of the downtown waterfront area, among them the chairman of the Port of Astoria Commission, the executive director of the chamber of commerce and the chairman of the Clatsop County Commission. Mayor Willis Van Dusen, another of the trolley's supporters, was quoted in a 2004 Daily Astorian article as saying that the trolley "has become almost a logo for the city, second only to the Astoria Column."

Because of the COVID-19 pandemic, all service was suspended in 2020. As of early July 2021, the line was scheduled to reopen for service on July 23.

Following the collapse of the Buoy Beer building in June 2022, services carrying passengers were restricted to between Basin Street to Sixth Street. With the demolition of most of the building complete, full service along the line resumed in July 2024.

== Facilities and acquisitions ==
Benches and shelters were installed at several stops along the line in 2000 and 2001. In 2002, a new carbarn was built on Industry Street, at the line's west end, where the trolley car is stored and maintained. The 4,000-square-foot (370 m^{2}) building is owned by the city of Astoria. In 2004, the Sunset Empire Transportation District opened a new bus transit center near the trolley line, at Ninth Avenue and Marine Drive.

In 2005, the San Antonio Museum of Art (SAMA), which had previously been unwilling to sell car 300, agreed to allow the Astoria Riverfront Trolley Association (ARTA) to buy it. The price was $50,000, and it was paid for almost entirely with donations, but with the city of Astoria contributing $5,000. The purchase was completed in early 2006.

In 2010, the car was fitted with a GPS tracking device, and the Astoria-Warrenton Chamber of Commerce makes location information available to the public on its website. The data is updated online every two minutes while the trolley is running.

In November 2023, the group acquired a second trolley with funds from an anonymous donor. This being a rebuilt ex-Ballarat Tramways M-Class Melbourne Tram No. 183 (numbered as Ballarat No. 30 prior to rebuild). The acquisition of Car 183 will "provide a new host for dedicated runs and special event rentals, like group outings, weddings or conferences." in addition to being a backup to Car 300 during the operating season.

== Car 300 history ==
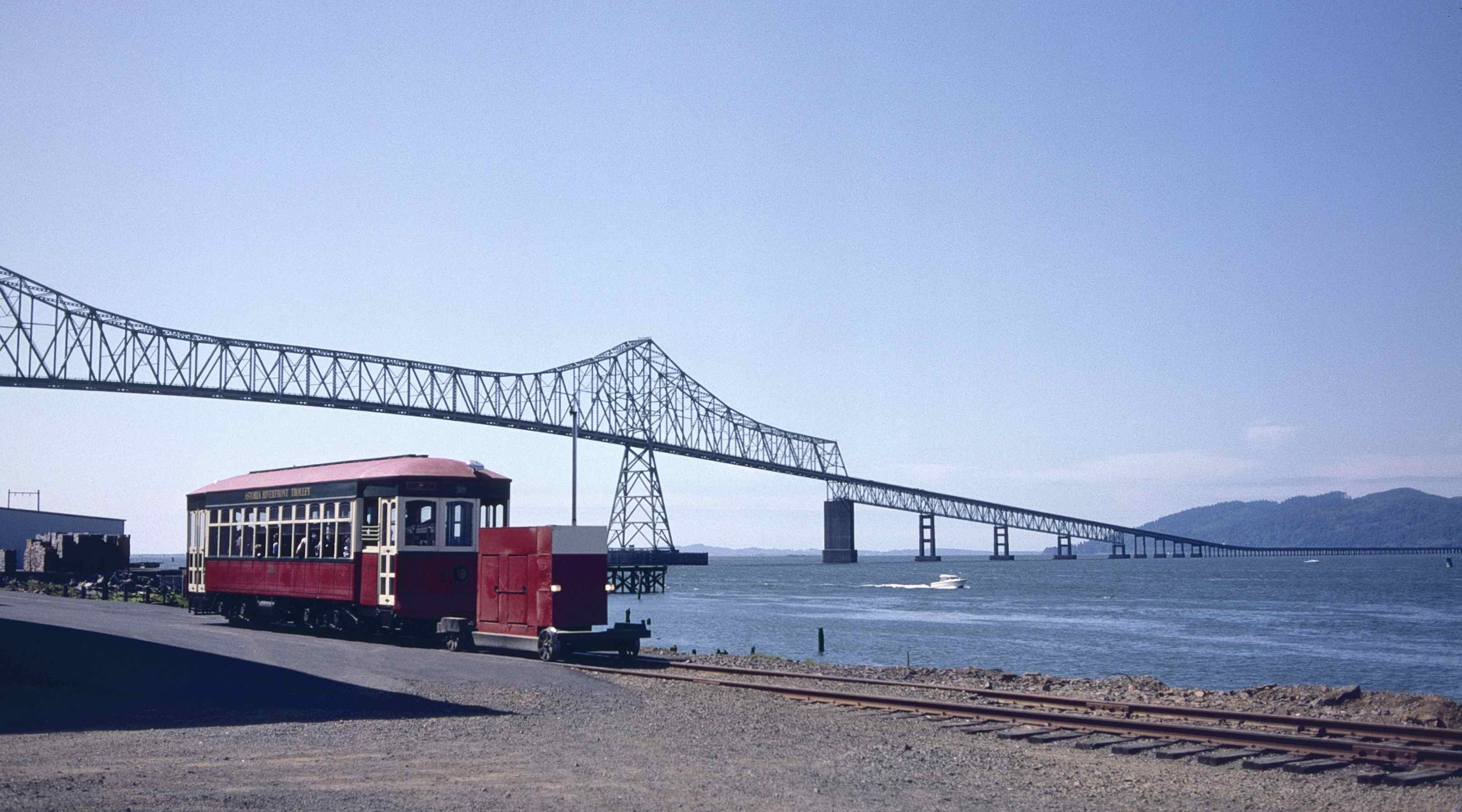
The trolley line passes under the southern end of the 4-mile (6 km) Astoria–Megler Bridge. This view is northwest, looking across the mouth of the Columbia towards Washington.

ARTA's oldest streetcar is No. 300, nicknamed "Old 300" and built in 1913 by the American Car Company for the streetcar system in San Antonio, Texas. It served San Antonio until the abandonment of streetcar service there in 1933 and was acquired at that time by the San Antonio Museum Association, former parent of the San Antonio Museum of Art. In 1981, SAMA opened in a former Lone Star Brewery building located along the tracks of the Texas Transportation Company. As an additional attraction for museum visitors, car 300 was restored to operating condition, and in October 1982 it began providing public rides along a short section of track behind the art museum. This heritage trolley service was discontinued at the end of 1985 due to budget cuts, and the trolley car, by then already nicknamed "Old Number 300", went back into storage.

No. 300 was brought to Oregon in June 1990 by Gales Creek Enterprises (GCE), the then-new operator of the Willamette Shore Trolley line in Portland. GCE was leasing the car from the San Antonio Museum Association. Car 300 was the main streetcar on the WST line through the 1994 season, but in 1995 the city of Lake Oswego decided to give the operating contract for the WST instead to the Oregon Electric Railway Historical Society, and that group substituted its own historic streetcars to provide WST service. GCE moved car 300 to storage at the Oregon Electric Railway Museum, located near Glenwood (and Gales Creek) at that time. Meanwhile, the San Antonio Museum Association was dissolved in 1994, and the San Antonio Museum of Art became car 300's owner.

In 1998, Astoria officials learned of the car's availability and secured a five-year lease agreement with SAMA. The car was brought to Astoria in December 1998 to be restored, and it inaugurated the Astoria Riverfront Trolley service in June 1999. In 2003, the lease agreement was extended for another five years, but in 2005 this was superseded by an outright purchase, after SAMA agreed to sell the car to the Astoria Riverfront Trolley Association.

== Car 183 history ==
The M-class was a class of 17 trams built by Duncan & Fraser, Adelaide for the Hawthorn Tramways Trust (HTT) as numbers 1 to 10, and 33 to 39. All passed to the Melbourne & Metropolitan Tramways Board on 2 February 1920 when it took over the Municipal Tramway Trusts, becoming the M-class and being renumbered 107 to 116, and 183 to 189.

These were four-wheel (single truck) trams of the California open-combination, drop-end body design, of which several dozen others operated in Melbourne under various operator, differing in details to varying extents. These cars had clerestory roofs, a centrally located passenger saloon (over the wheels) with four windows on each side, and open end platforms for smokers - each with two cross-bench seats, and separated from the drivers cabin by a bulkhead featuring stained glass lead-light panels.

Apart from being renumbered, all trams were repainted in the M&MTB standard brown ("chocolate & cream") livery; when the alphanumeric classification scheme was condensed they joined the other drop-end, open California combination cars as A class. Cars 183 to 189 had been built with air-brakes, and those not retro-fitted by the Trust were so equipped by the M&MTB soon after acquisition.

In January 1930, numbers 107 and 108 were sold to the State Electricity Commission of Victoria, going to Bendigo and Ballarat respectively. Evidently they were deemed a success, with the other eight following that March. February 1935 saw cars 183 to 189 following suit. Numbers 109, 112, 114, 115, 185, 187, and 188 entered service in Bendigo, 110, 111, 113, 116, 183, 184, 186, and 189 in Ballarat, most being converted to One-Man operation.

Following the 1971 closure of the Ballarat tramways, No. 183 (now numbered Ballarat No.30) was sold and transported to a property near Kaniva, Victoria. It only stayed in Kaniva only until 1974 when it was retrieved by the Haddon Tramway Workshops (later known as the Melbourne Tramcar Preservation Association) with the intent of restoration. Due to a change in focus for the organisation, No. 183 was sold to Gales Creek Enterprises in the United States in 1980. Only a year later in Portland, Oregon the tram suffered a devastating fire, burning most of its wooden body, leaving intact only the steel frame and running gear. No 183 was kept in storage until 2005, when a rebuilding project began in Willits, California. The restoration was completed in 2015, with the car subsequently being put up for sale. According to the company “The entire body has been rebuilt as close to the original design as possible using traditional mortise and tenon joinery from the frame up. Considerable emphasis was placed on maintaining the original structural design and construction techniques.”

== See also ==
- List of heritage railroads in the United States
