= H class Melbourne tram =

H-class
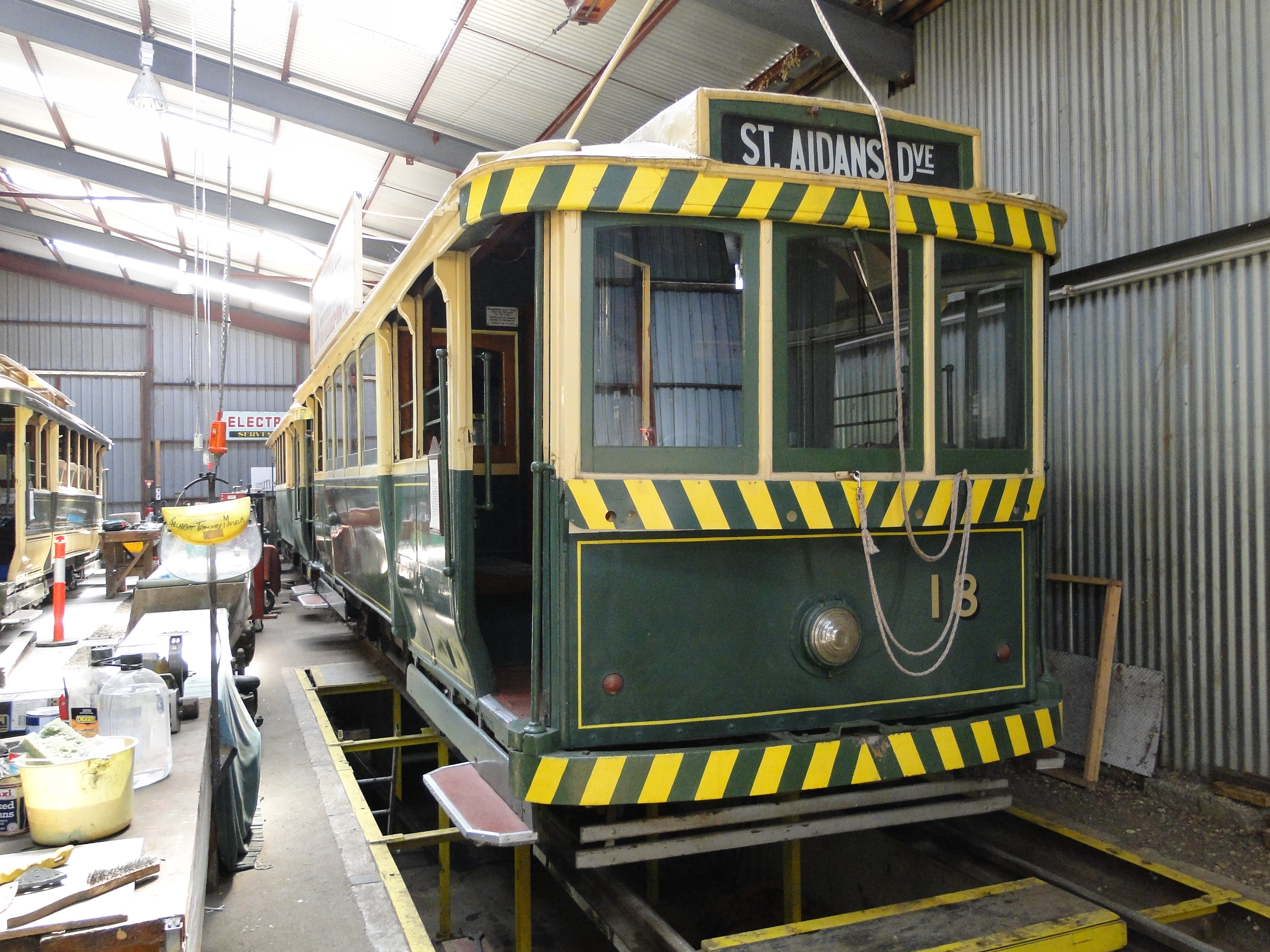
- Manufacturer: Duncan & Fraser
- Assembly: Adelaide
- Constructed: 1913
- Number built: 10
- Fleet numbers: 54-63
- Capacity: 34

Specifications
- Car length: 9.73 metres (31 ft 11 in)
- Width: 2.72 metres (8 ft 11 in)
- Height: 3.25 metres (10 ft 8 in)
- Wheel diameter: 838 mm (33.0 in)
- Weight: 12.1 tonnes
- Current collection: Trolley pole
- Bogies: JG Brill Company 21E
- Track gauge: 1,435 mm (4 ft 8 1/2 in)

The H-class was a class of ten trams built by Duncan & Fraser, Adelaide for the Prahran & Malvern Tramways Trust (PMTT). All passed to the Melbourne & Metropolitan Tramways Board on 2 February 1920 when it took over the PMTT becoming the H-class retaining their running numbers. In 1931, number 63 was sold for further use on the Ballarat network and placed in service as number 18.

== Preservation ==
One has been preserved:

- 63 by the Ballarat Tramway Museum as number 18
