= N class Melbourne tram =

N-class
- Manufacturer: Duncan & Fraser
- Assembly: Adelaide
- Constructed: 1916
- Number built: 10
- Fleet numbers: 117-126
- Capacity: 48

Specifications
- Car length: 13.55 m (44 ft 5 in)
- Width: 2.62 m (8 ft 7 in)
- Height: 3.10 m (10 ft 2 in)
- Wheel diameter: 838 mm (33.0 in) (driving); 508 mm (20.0 in) (pony)
- Weight: 16.3 tonnes
- Traction motors: GE 201G (2 x 65 hp (48 kW))
- Power supply: 600 Volts DC
- Current collection: Trolley pole
- Bogies: JG Brill Company 22E
- Track gauge: 1,435 mm (4 ft 8 1/2 in)

The N-class was a class of 10 trams built by Duncan & Fraser, Adelaide for the Hawthorn Tramways Trust (HTT) as numbers 11 to 20, all passed to the Melbourne & Metropolitan Tramways Board (M&MTB) on 2 February 1920, when it took over the HTT, becoming the N-class and being renumbered 117 to 126.

These were Maximum Traction bogie tramcars of the drop-end-and-centre design (precursors of the Melbourne W class trams), with four doorways in the open centre (smokers') compartment as well as one at the front and another at the rear; each of the two passenger saloons featured four side windows. The cars were very similar to trams built by Duncan & Fraser for the contemporary Prahran & Malvern Tramways Trust (P&MTT) in 1913/14, which had three saloon windows, a larger smokers' compartment, and three centre doorways.

Cars 14 to 20 were used to inaugurate services for the Trust on 6 April 1916, and the others entered service within two weeks. As a trial for what became the P class trams, one car (number 20) was fitted with air brakes and the large roof-mounted cylindrical destination displays, which were unique to the HTT. The remaining cars were equipped with air brakes after 1918.

After the M&MTB take-over, the original HTT French grey livery was replaced by a brown colour scheme and fleet number of each tramcar was increased by 106; a simplification of the alphanumeric classification scheme saw the whole class being added to the C class (which had originally been allocated to the 1913 P&MTT Maximum Traction bogie trams). Improvements over the following years included the fitting of air brakes, route number boxes, and roof-mounted destination boxes being replaced by the standard Melbourne boxes; seating capacity was reduced to 44 when an aisle was cut-through the drop centre cross-bench seats. By the 1930s when they had been painted in the standard Melbourne green colours, these trams resembled a smaller version of the ubiquitous Melbourne W class trams. Tramcars that survived to serve during World War II had their rear doorways blanked-off as a safety measure.

One car, number 121, was scrapped in 1938, whilst 125 was placed into storage in 1940 and the body was later sold in early 1945. In October 1945, numbers 117 and 123 were sold for further use to the Ballarat and Bendigo tramways, respectively. Number 118 was sold to Geelong in January 1947, being joined by 120, 122, and 126 in the last quarter of that year, and 119 the following January. Number 124 was sent to Ballarat in 1947. When the Geelong tramways closed in 1956, number 118 was scrapped, however, the other four were transferred to Bendigo and saw further service until early 1972.

== Preservation ==
Five have been preserved:

- 119 by the Sydney Tramway Museum as Ballarat number (2nd) 37
- 120, 122, 123, and 126 by the Bendigo Trust as (3rd) 4, N 122, 23, and (3rd) 2 respectively.
