= Hawthorn tram depot =

Tram depot and museum in Hawthorn, Victoria, Australia

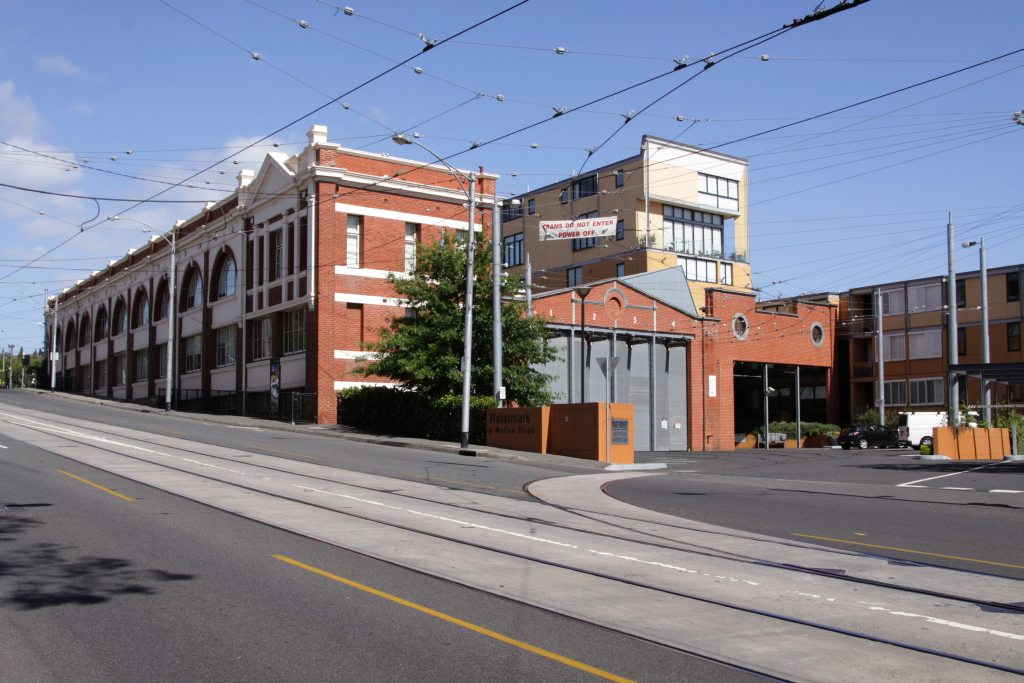
- The tram depot, from Wallen Road, in 2012
- Interactive map of Hawthorn tram depot

Location
- Location: Wallen Road, Hawthorn, Melbourne, Victoria, Australia
- Coordinates: 37°49′39″S 145°01′29″E

Characteristics
- Operator: Hawthorn Tramways Trust (1916–1920); Melbourne & Metropolitan Tramways Board (1920–1965)
- Depot code: H
- Type: Tram depot and electrical substation
- Roads: 7

History
- Opened: April 1916; 110 years ago
- Closed: 13 February 1965
- Original: Hawthorn Tramways Trust

Hawthorn Tramways Trust Depot

History
- Built for: Hawthorn Tramways Trust
- Original use: Tram depot and electrical substation (1916–1965)

Site notes
- Architects: Leonard Flannagan (1916); Sydney Smith and Ogg (1917); Tzannes Associates (2002)
- Architectural style: Richardsonian Romanesque
- Current use: Tram museum (since 2003); Residential apartments (since 2002)
- Owner: VicTrack
- Management: Friends of Hawthorn Tram Depot
- Website: hawthorntramdepot.org.au

Victorian Heritage Register
- Official name: Former Hawthorn Tramways Trust Depot
- Type: Registered place
- Designated: 15 December 1994
- Reference no.: VHR H0876
- Heritage overlay no.: HO133
- Category: Transport - Tramways

Victorian Heritage Register
- Official name: Electric Tram No. 13
- Type: Registered object
- Designated: 14 February 2008
- Reference no.: VHR H2147
- Category: Transport - Tramways

The Hawthorn tram depot was built in April 1916 by the Hawthorn Tramways Trust (HTT). It was built on the corner of Power Street and Wallen Road, Hawthorn, a suburb of Melbourne, Australia. It is also known as the Melbourne Tram Museum. The depot was close to the junction of the HTT's two main lines. It was taken over by the Melbourne & Metropolitan Tramways Board (MMTB) in 1920. In 1925, the depot was used as a school to teach tram drivers and tram conductors. In 1940, the building was also used to make uniforms for MMTB staff.

The depot closed as a running depot on 13 February 1965, and was kept in use for training and uniform manufacture until the 1990s.

The depot was added to the Victorian Heritage Register on 15 December 1994 in recognition of its historical and architectural significance; and was also added to a non-statutory list by the Victorian branch of the National Trust on 1 October 1990. One of the preserved trams within the museum – the V-class tram, initially operated by the North Melbourne Electric Tramways and Lighting Company as No. 13; and renumbered as No. 214 when transferred to the MTTB – was also added to the Victorian Heritage Register on 14 February 2008 in recognition of its historical, technical, aesthetic, and social significance.

In August 1998, Transport Minister Robin Cooper announced the site would be redeveloped as a residential complex by the Urban Land Corporation, with part of the depot to be retained as a museum. The museum was opened by Transport Minister Peter Batchelor on 19 January 2003.

== History ==
Located at the junction of Power Street and Wallen Road, Hawthorn, the building was designed by Leonard Flannagan in the Richardsonian Romanesque style. When opened in 1916, the depot consisted of a three-storey building which housed offices, amenities, and the electrical substation that provided traction power to the tramway, together with a four-road tram shed located behind. It was enlarged in 1917 with a second three-road tram shed designed by architects Sydney Smith and Ogg. It was planned to further expand Hawthorn depot, however, it was clear that the rapid growth of electric tramway traffic in the 1920s was outstripping the growth potential of the site. Instead, a large new depot was built at Camberwell, near the junction of the Burwood, Wattle Park, and Burke Road tramlines.

Conversion of Melbourne's cable tram system to electric traction and construction of new tramlines saw Hawthorn depot supply tramcars and crews for the Chapel Street and City-Hawthorn via Bridge Road services. The depot continued to operate as a running depot, and acquired an additional function in 1925, when the MMTB moved the tram driver and conductor schools to Hawthorn depot from Fitzroy. The MMTB also opened its own uniform factory in the depot building in 1940.

The tram sheds were built for the narrow tramcars produced in the second decade of the twentieth century. However, in 1939 the MMTB introduced new “luxury” SW6 class tramcars with upholstered seats and sliding doors that were too wide to fit into the old tram sheds. Passengers of routes operated out of Hawthorn demanded that some of these more comfortable trams be allocated to these services. As a result, the brick facades of the depot were removed in the 1940s, which allowed the wider tramcars to fit inside the tram sheds.

The increase of motor vehicle traffic saw a declining need for public transport carried by trams, so the Hawthorn depot was closed as a running depot in 1965 due to the elimination of the City-Hawthorn service and its replacement by diversion of the City-Burwood service from Swan Street and Batman Avenue to Bridge Road and Flinders Street. Instead of continuing as a running depot, it was used for the storage of surplus tramcars, and for tramcars required for operation of the driver training school. In the early 1990s, the manufacture of uniforms was contracted out to commercial suppliers and driver training was returned to individual depots.

=== Residential redevelopment ===
In 1996, the depot was included on the Victorian Heritage Register and soon after, was offered for redevelopment. The redevelopment, completed in 2002, included the innovative conversion of the main depot building to residential units and the building of new residential units at the rear of the depot site. The original facades of the two sheds were reconstructed, although all that remains of the second shed is the facade – the rest of the building was replaced by the residential development.

== Tram museum ==
The tram museum is owned by VicTrack and the museum is staffed and run by volunteers via the Friends of Hawthorn Tram Depot. This non-profit group was established to preserve the history of Melbourne's trams and includes a number of fully-restored trams; including one of Melbourne's original cable trams.

The Bellcord is the quarterly in house publication of the Friends of Hawthorn Tram Depot.

=== Preserved trams ===
As of August 2026, the following nineteen trams were preserved at the Melbourne tram museum Hawthorn site:

Class / number	Image	Entered service	Description	Notes
MOTC #28-256		c.1887	The only cable car tram preserved at the site	
V class #214		13 October 1906	Operated by the North Melbourne Electric Tramways and Lighting Company as No. 13; renamed by the MTTB in 1922; retired from service in 1925; added to the Victorian Heritage Register on 14 February 2008	
HTT #8		c. 1916 – c. 1917	Sold by the HTT to the MMTB in 1920 and entered service as a M class tram	
S class #164		1916	Owned by TMSV Bylands	
T class #180		1917	Owned by TMSV Bylands	
L class #104		1921	Ran a charter for employees in 1990, celebrating the 80th anniversary of Malvern depot	
L class #106		1921		
X class #217		1924	Owned by TMSV Bylands	
W class #380		25 December 1925	Upgraded to W2 status in 1929; converted back to a W in 1988	
W1 class #431		13 June 1927	Upgraded to W2 status in 1936, converted back to a W1 in 1986	
Y class #469		18 June 1927	Used as a driver training tram after withdrawal in 1965	
W2 class #510		8 June 1928	Involved in a major collision in April 1989, resulting in the temporary end of heritage tram tours	
X2 class #676		2 July 1930	Last heritage tram to operate a tour outside of a special event	
Y1 #613		27 September 1930	All class members are in preservation	
W5 class #774		4 June 1936	Last W Class with square front windows	
VR #53		November 1942	Formerly used on the Victorian Railways Sandringham–Black Rock tramway; sold to the MMTB in 1959	
W7 class #1040		1 August 1956	Last W class tram to be built	
PCC #1041		16 August 1973	Prototype for the Z, A & B Class trams	
Z1 class #81		18 October 1977	In a special 'Pakistan W-11' livery. Dates from the 2006 Commonwealth Games	

== See also ==
- Architecture of Melbourne
- List of places on the Victorian Heritage Register in the City of Boroondara
- List of museums in Melbourne
- Timeline of trams in Melbourne
