= Hawthorn Tramways Trust =

The Hawthorn Tramways Trust was a tram operator in Melbourne, Australia. Its assets and liabilities were transferred to the Melbourne & Metropolitan Tramways Board on 2 February 1920.

== History ==
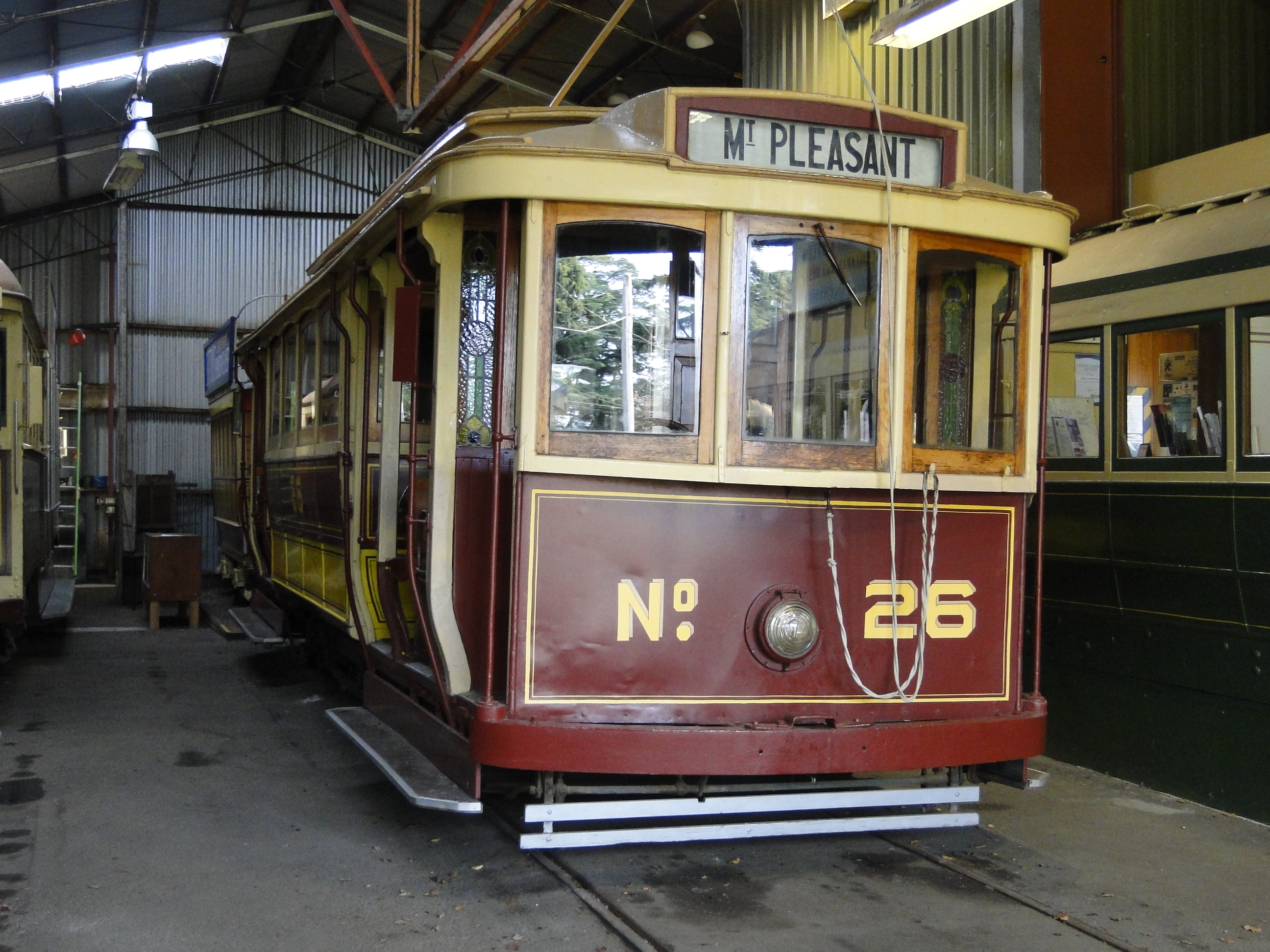
Ballarat tram No. 26, built in 1916 by Duncan & Fraser for the Hawthorn Tramways Trust at the Ballarat Tramway Museum depot at Lake Wendouree

The Hawthorn Tramways Trust (HTT) was formed pursuant to the Melbourne to Burwood Tramways Act, 1914, to construct and manage electric tramways within the cities of Melbourne, Richmond, Hawthorn, and Camberwell, and to acquire a horse tramway from the Melbourne Tramway & Omnibus Company (MTOC). The Trust operated the Hawthorn tram depot and was also responsible for the acquisition of Wattle Park in the suburb of Burwood in 1916.

The HTT was the only early electric tram operator to open a route into the central business district (CBD), although it and the inner suburbs were well served at that time by the extensive Melbourne cable tramway system. The main route was from Princes Bridge to Burwood, with a branch line to Wattle Park. The Trust also took over the MTOC's Hawthorn horse tram, and the electric tramway that replaced it operated as a shuttle service between the Richmond cable tram terminus and Hawthorn Depot.

On 6 April 1916, the first section of the Trust's tramways to open was that from the HTT Depot, at the corner of Riversdale Road and Power Street in Hawthorn, to the city terminus in Batman Avenue at Princes Bridge. The section to Auburn Road was brought into operation on 7 May, with the line to Bowen Street, Camberwell, just past the Junction, commencing services at the end of that month. The final section, to Boundary (now Warrigal) Road in Burwood, was opened on 10 June. With the opening of the Power Street and Burwood Road tramway to Hawthorn Bridge on 21 June 1916, the HTT reached its maximum mileage.

Passenger services were initially provided by ten small four-wheel M-class trams, and ten larger Maximum Traction N-class bogie cars, all built by Duncan & Fraser of Adelaide. It was soon realised that they were totally inadequate for the traffic offering, and four O-class Maximum Traction bogie trams were purchased from the neighbouring Prahran and Malvern Tramways Trust in August 1916. Although they had also been built by Duncan & Fraser only four years previously, they were of a different design to the Trust's other tramcars and proved to be not as good.

A repeat order of 15 car was placed with the builders, to the original designs, except that each was one foot (300 mm) longer, to provide more leg room in the open sections. Eight were P-class Maximum Traction bogie cars, and the remaining seven were M-class four-wheel trams. Due to a combination of circumstances, the smaller trams were never used, and the bodies were sold to the Footscray Tramway Trust. Unusually, the Trust's trams were painted in predominantly French Grey — at a time when nearly all other trams in Melbourne were painted in variations of brown liveries.

The Trust was dissolved on 20 February 1920, and control passed to the Melbourne & Metropolitan Tramways Board.

All but five of the trams built for the HTT saw further service after their time in Melbourne, being sold to other operators. A number of those tramcars have been preserved, including Tram 8 at the Melbourne Tram Museum. Of the 24 surviving tramcars, 21 are operating (or operable) at various tram museums across Australia, as well as overseas.
