= Melbourne, Brunswick & Coburg Tramways Trust =

- Parent: City of Melbourne; Municipality of Brunswick; Municipality of Coburg
- Commenced operation: 1914
- Ceased operation: 1 February 1920
- Headquarters: Coburg
- Service area: Melbourne
- Depots: 1
- Fleet: 12 S class 6 T class

The Melbourne, Brunswick & Coburg Tramways Trust was a tram operator in Melbourne, Australia

== History ==
Originally constituted as The Brunswick & Coburg Tramway Trust (BCTT) by act of Parliament in February 1914. This authorised the municipalities of Brunswick and Coburg to build and operate an electric tramway from the terminus of the North Carlton (Rathdowne Street) cable tram in Park Street, through the mentioned municipalities, and convert the Sydney Road horse tramway to electric traction.

In October 1914 the Trust was reconstituted as The Melbourne, Brunswick & Coburg Tramways Trust (MBCTT) by inclusion of the municipality of Melbourne, and the southern terminus altered to the Queensberry Street (City) terminus of the cable trams from the south-eastern suburbs. This alteration was much to the benefit of passengers, who were taken to within walking distance of the Central Business District.

The line started from the corner of Queensberry and Swanston Streets (Note: The northern part of Swanston Street was called Madeline St at the time) in the City of Melbourne, proceeding north via Swanston, Elgin, and Lygon Streets to Albion Street and along Holmes Road to a junction at the corner of Moreland Road. The mainline proceeded west along Moreland Road to Sydney Road and north as far as Bakers Road, whilst a branch line continued north along Nicholson Street to Bell Street, opening in stages during 1916.

The MBCTT was taken over by the Melbourne & Metropolitan Tramways Board (MMTB) on 2 February 1920. Although much altered, the MBCTT lines remain open today being served by Yarra Trams routes 1, 6, and 19.

== Rolling stock ==
The initial rolling stock consisted of 12 single truck combination tramcars built by Duncan & Fraser of Adelaide. All passed to the M&MTB, and were classified as the S class, and later reclassified as (Coburg) A class.

Another six cars were ordered in 1916 from Duncan & Fraser. These six cars differed in having a longer wheelbase, long divided saloon, and no motormen’s bulkheads. These entered service in late 1917. All passed to the M&MTB to become the T class.

A further six trams were ordered in 1918; these were meant to the same as the T class cars, but after encountering difficulties in obtaining the same equipment, the order was altered to a slightly modified design of the S class. They were still under construction when the MBCTT was taken over, and delivered directly to the MMTB between 1920 and 1922, becoming the S1 class.

A spare truck and set of electrical equipment had been ordered with the first batch of 12 trams, in order to expedite maintenance. When extra cars arrived in 1917, the need for these spares was obviated and the opportunity was taken to use them for the construction of a works car, which became MMTB scrubber tram 1A, later number 5.

== Depot ==
The depot and offices were constructed near the corner of Moreland Road and Nicholson Street, Coburg. Although closed in 1952, the depot continued to be used to store trams for some years before becoming the overhead maintenance depot, and was in use as such until 2002. It was demolished in 2007.
