= Y class Melbourne tram =

Y-class
- Manufacturer: Melbourne & Metropolitan Tramways Board
- Constructed: 1927
- Number built: 1
- Fleet numbers: 469
- Capacity: 53

Specifications
- Car length: 13.87 m (45 ft 6 in)
- Width: 2.64 m (8 ft 8 in)
- Height: 3.15 m (10 ft 4 in)
- Wheel diameter: 673 mm (26.5 in)
- Weight: 16.8 t (37,000 lb)
- Current collection: Trolley pole
- Track gauge: 1,435 mm (4 ft 8 1/2 in)

The Y-class was a one-member tram class built by the Melbourne & Metropolitan Tramways Board. It entered service in September 1927 initially operating a 24-mile tourist service, before being used on regular services on the Burwood line and all night services from Camberwell depot in company with the Y1-class.

In 1965, it was transferred to Glenhuntly depot to avoid running into the city due to a lack of number boxes. It was withdrawn in April 1965 and retained as a driver training car.

It has been preserved as part of the VicTrack heritage fleet at Hawthorn depot.

Y1-class
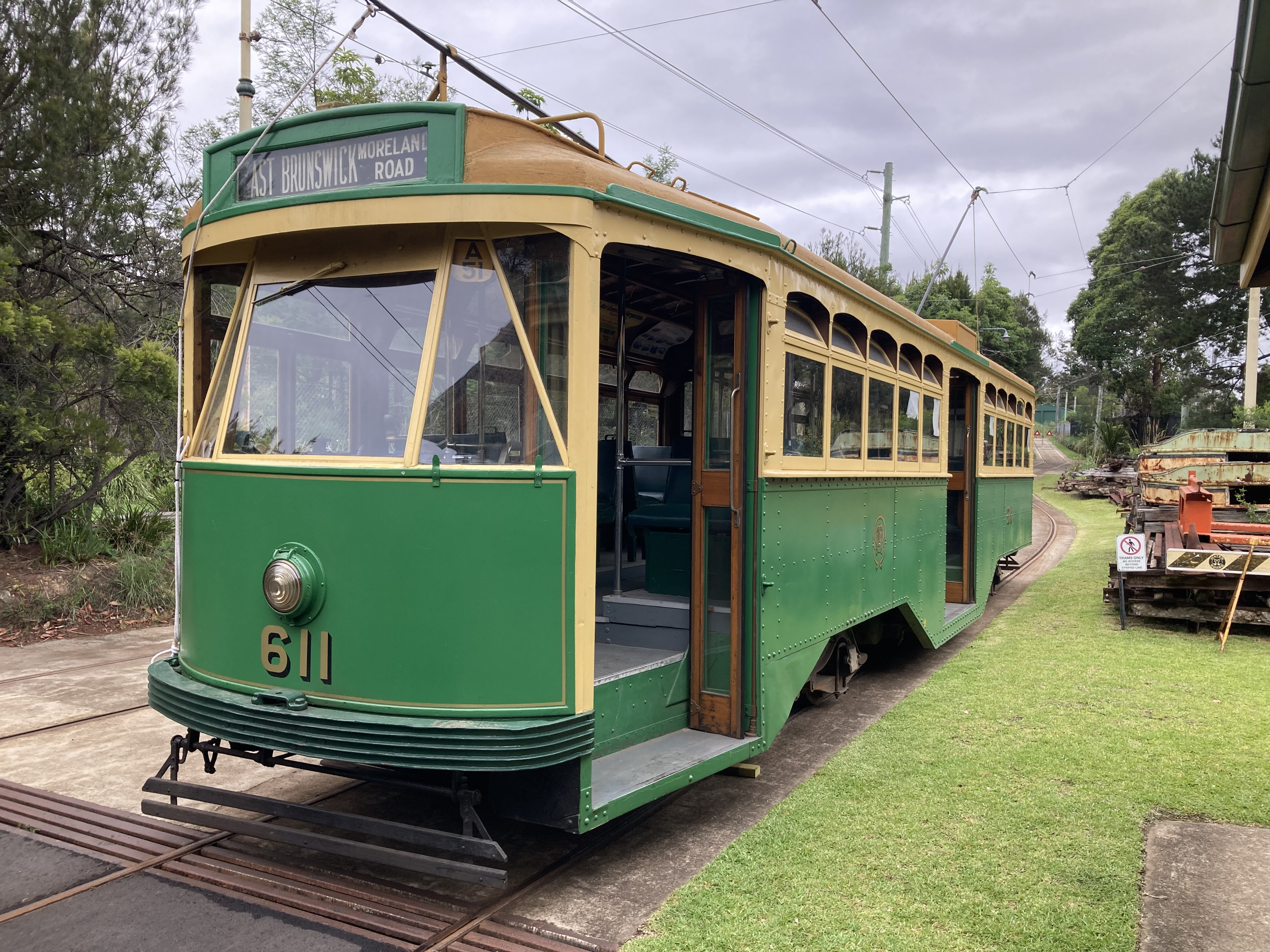
- Y1 611 preserved in operating condition at the Sydney Tramway Museum
- Manufacturer: Melbourne & Metropolitan Tramways Board
- Constructed: 1930
- Number built: 4
- Fleet numbers: 610-613
- Capacity: 53

Specifications
- Car length: 13.72 m (45 ft 0 in)
- Width: 2.64 m (8 ft 8 in)
- Height: 3.11 m (10 ft 2 in)
- Wheel diameter: 838 mm (33.0 in) (as built); 711 mm (28.0 in) (as modified)
- Wheelbase: 1.6 m (5 ft 3 in)
- Weight: 20.1 t (44,000 lb)
- Current collection: Trolley pole
- Track gauge: 1,435 mm (4 ft 8 1/2 in)

== Y1-class ==
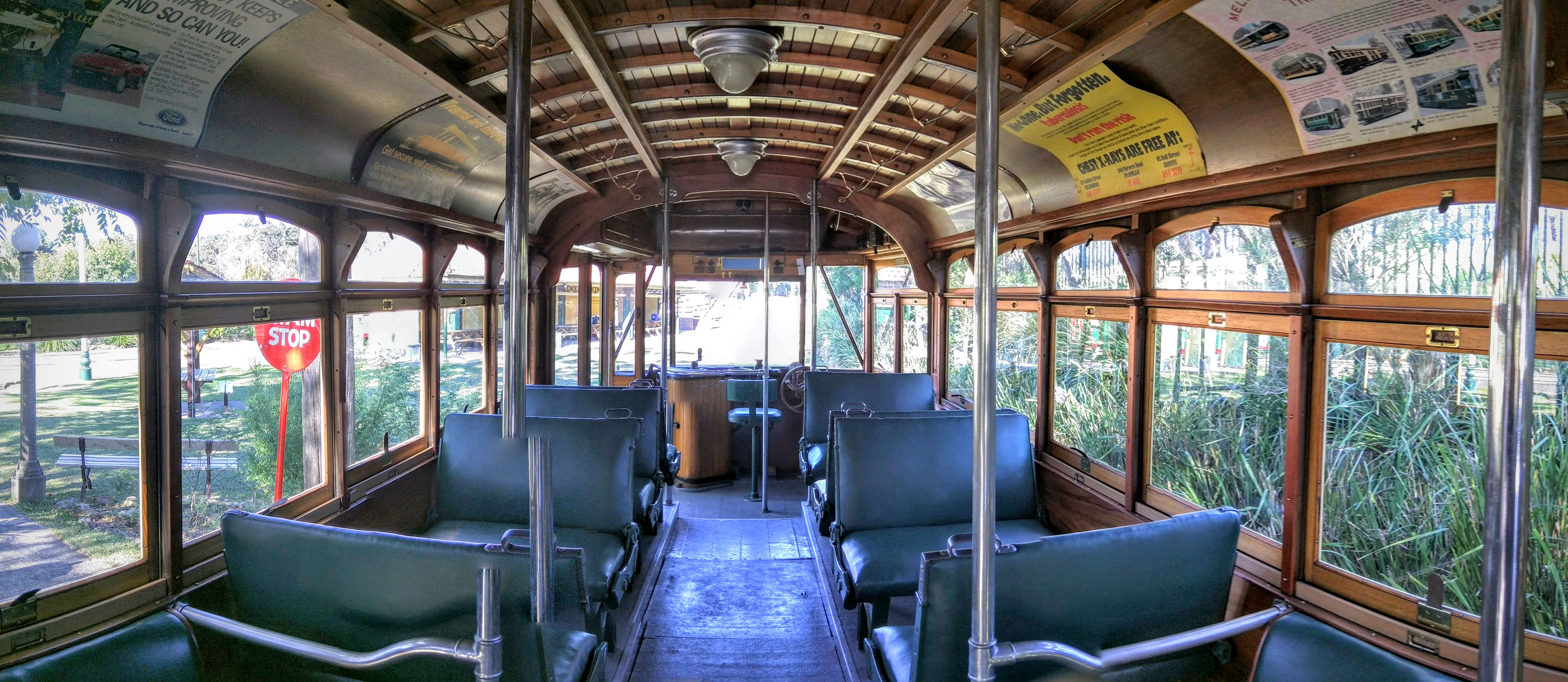
Interior of Y1 611 at the Sydney Tramway Museum

The Y1-class was a class of four trams built by the Melbourne & Metropolitan Tramways Board built as a modified version of the Y-class to trial one man operation. Initially used on East and West Preston routes from Collins Street, from 1934 they were transferred to the Toorak line. From 1936 they were used on Burwood services from Camberwell depot. In 1933, 613 was used on Victorian Railways' Sandringham railway station to Black Rock line.

In 1965, the class was transferred to Glenhuntly depot to avoid running into the city due to a lack of number boxes. Withdrawn in 1965, they were retained as driver training cars at Hawthorn depot with 613 having just been overhauled at Preston Workshops. In late 1990, 611 was briefly used in regular service out of Kew depot.

== Preservation ==
All four have been preserved:

- 610 by the Bendigo Tramways
- 611 by the Sydney Tramway Museum
- 612 by the Tramway Museum Society of Victoria
- 613 as part of the VicTrack heritage fleet at Hawthorn depot
