= U class Melbourne tram =

Class of Australian trams

U-class
- Manufacturer: Duncan & Fraser
- Assembly: Adelaide
- Constructed: 1906
- Number built: 10
- Fleet numbers: 202–211
- Capacity: 32

Specifications
- Car length: 9.74 m (31 ft 11 in)
- Width: 2.64 m (8 ft 8 in)
- Height: 3.25 m (10 ft 8 in)
- Wheel diameter: 838 mm (33.0 in)
- Weight: 12.9 t (28,000 lb)
- Current collection: Trolley pole
- Bogies: JG Brill Company 21E
- Track gauge: 1,435 mm (4 ft 8 1/2 in)

The U-class was a class of ten trams built by Duncan & Fraser, Adelaide from JG Brill Company kits for the North Melbourne Electric Tramway & Lighting Company (NMET) as numbers 1–10. All passed to the Melbourne & Metropolitan Tramways Board on 1 August 1922 when it took over the NMET becoming the U-class and renumbered 202–211.
