= S class Melbourne tram =

Tram

S-class
- Manufacturer: Duncan & Fraser
- Assembly: Adelaide
- Constructed: 1916-22
- Number built: 18
- Fleet numbers: 151-171
- Capacity: 44 (as built); 36 (as modified)

Specifications
- Car length: 10.67 m (35 ft 0 in)
- Width: 2.45 m (8 ft 0 in)
- Height: 3.26 m (10 ft 8 in)
- Wheel diameter: 838 mm (33.0 in)
- Wheelbase: 2.74 m (9 ft 0 in)
- Weight: 12.6 tonnes
- Current collection: Trolley pole
- Bogies: JG Brill Company 21E
- Track gauge: 1,435 mm (4 ft 8 1/2 in)

The S-class was a class of 18 trams built by Duncan & Fraser, Adelaide for the Melbourne, Brunswick & Coburg Tramways Trust (MBCTT). The first 12 entered service in 1916, numbered 1 to 12. All passed to the Melbourne & Metropolitan Tramways Board (MMTB) on 2 February 1920 when it took over the MBCTT, becoming the S-class (Note: Later becoming (Coburg) A class.) and renumbered 154-165.

The other six were built to a slightly modified design, being delivered to the MMTB between 1920 and 1922. Originally numbered 19, 20, 21, 139, 23, and 171, they were renumbered 166 to 171 respectively and classed S1.

In 1941/42, 14 were rebuilt for one-man operation, seven for the isolated Footscray network and seven for all night services on the main network. The Footscray cars were returned to crewed configuration in 1947.

== Preservation ==
One has been preserved:

- 164 as part of the VicTrack heritage fleet at Hawthorn depot
