= M class Melbourne tram =

Type of tram

M-class
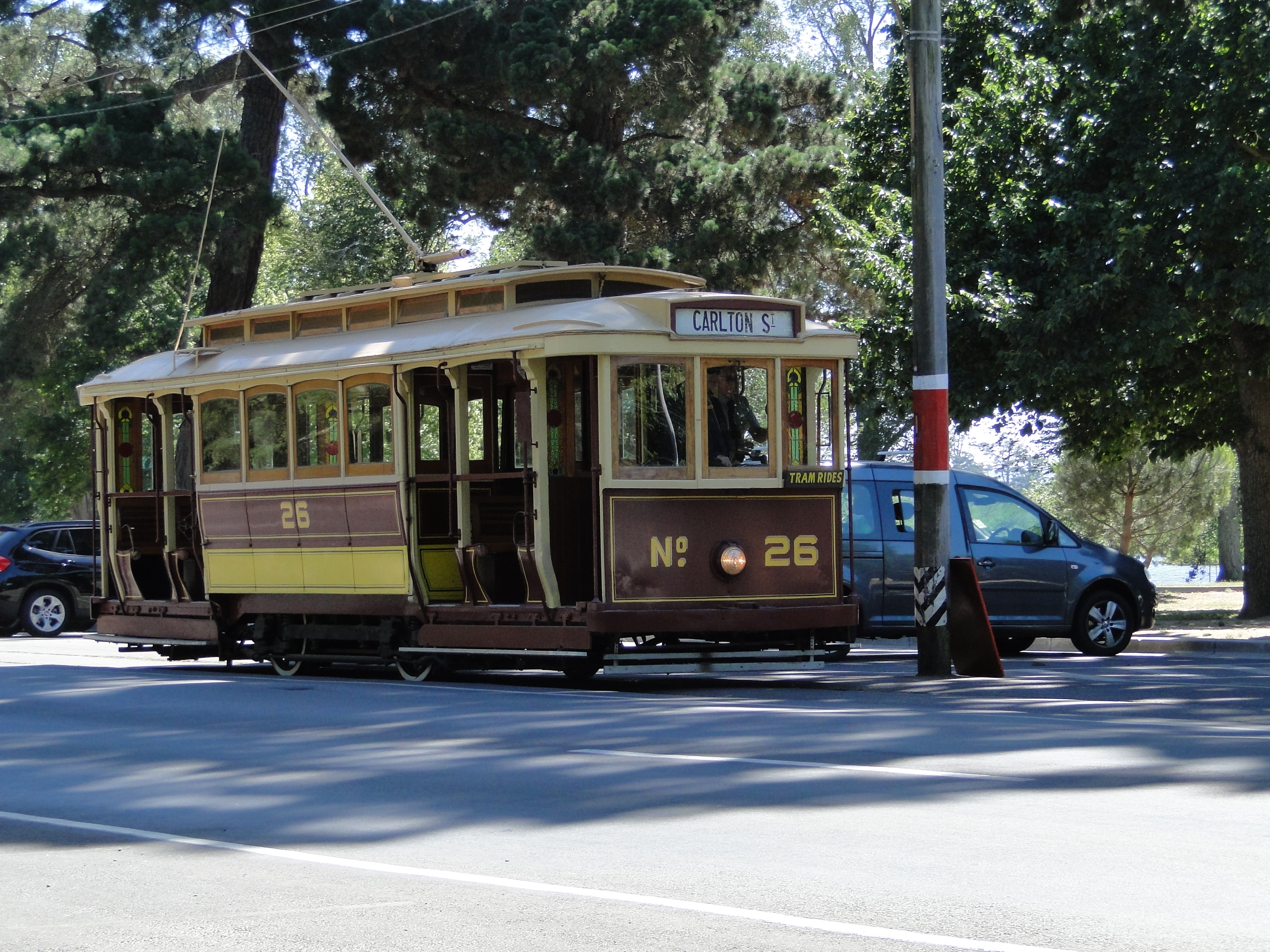
- Manufacturer: Duncan & Fraser
- Assembly: Adelaide
- Constructed: 1916-17
- Number built: 17
- Fleet numbers: 107-116, 183-189
- Capacity: 38

Specifications
- Car length: 9.7 or 10.0 m (31 ft 10 in or 32 ft 10 in)
- Width: 2.72 m (8 ft 11 in)
- Height: 3.25 m (10 ft 8 in)
- Wheel diameter: 838 mm (33.0 in)
- Wheelbase: 2.29 m (7 ft 6 in)
- Weight: 12.2 tonnes
- Traction motors: WH 225 (2 x 53 hp (40 kW)) & GE 203P (2 x 50 hp (37 kW))
- Power supply: 600 Volts DC
- Current collection: Trolley pole
- Bogies: JG Brill Company 21E & Sewell 21E
- Track gauge: 1,435 mm (4 ft 8 1/2 in)

The M-class was a class of 17 trams built by Duncan & Fraser, Adelaide for the Hawthorn Tramways Trust (HTT) as numbers 1 to 10, and 33 to 39. All passed to the Melbourne & Metropolitan Tramways Board on 2 February 1920 when it took over the Municipal Tramway Trusts, becoming the M-class and being renumbered 107 to 116, and 183 to 189.

These were four-wheel (single truck) trams of the California open-combination, drop-end body design, of which several dozen others operated in Melbourne under various operator, differing in details to varying extents. These cars had clerestory roofs, a centrally located passenger saloon (over the wheels) with four windows on each side, and open end platforms for smokers - each with two cross-bench seats, and separated from the drivers cabin by a bulkhead featuring stained glass lead-light panels.

In 1916 the HTT placed into service the first ten M class cars from late April to early July. When the Trust ordered seven more to the same design, they specified that more leg room was to be provided in the open drop-end smokers' compartments resulting in those trams being 1 foot (305 mm) longer than the first ten. Because the extension to Hawthorn Depot was not completed in time, the second batch of seven were stored at the builder's premises. After delivery was eventually taken, they then languished in storage at Hawthorn Depot as the electrical equipment to fit them out for service had been delayed due to World War I. Requiring finance for urgent track repairs, and unable to utilise the new trams, the HTT arranged to sell the car bodies to the Footscray Tramway Trust (FTT); the seven sets of Robison 21E trucks for these trams were retained by the HTT as the FTT already had sufficient Sewell 21E trucks and electrical equipment on hand to complete the trams to operating condition.

Alas, these trams never saw service for the FTT, as they were taken-over by the M&MTB before a power supply had been finalised. All seven trams were returned to Hawthorn Depot, where they entered service during August and September 1920, numbered 33 to 39. They were then transferred back to the isolated Footscray tramway system in time to inaugurate services there on 6 September 1921. When the time came for their first repaint, they were renumbered 183 to 189, whilst still at Footscray. From mid-September to late October 1923, six of these trams were transferred from Footscray to Essendon Depot, with number 188 joining them in February the next year.

Apart from being renumbered, all trams were repainted in the M&MTB standard brown ("chocolate & cream") livery; when the alphanumeric classification scheme was condensed they joined the other drop-end, open California combination cars as A class. Cars 183 to 189 had been built with air-brakes, and those not retro-fitted by the Trust were so equipped by the M&MTB soon after acquisition.

In January 1930, numbers 107 and 108 were sold to the State Electricity Commission of Victoria, going to Bendigo and Ballarat respectively. Evidently they were deemed a success, with the other eight following that March. February 1935 saw cars 183 to 189 following suit. Numbers 109, 112, 114, 115, 185, 187, and 188 entered service in Bendigo, 110, 111, 113, 116, 183, 184, 186, and 189 in Ballarat, most being converted to One-Man operation.

== Preservation ==
Eleven have been preserved:

- 107, 110, 185, 187, and 188 by the Bendigo Trust as (2nd) 12, (3rd) 6, (2nd) 19, 20, 21
- 111, 113, 116, 186, and 189 by the Ballarat Tramway Museum as 26, 28, 27, 32, and 33
- 114 as HTT 8, on display at the Melbourne Tram Museum, Hawthorn
- 183 (Ballarat number 30) was sold to the United States in 1980, and has been restored to a semblance of its original condition after a devastating arson attack. It is now operational at the Astoria Riverfront Trolley, Oregon
- 184 by the Perth Electric Tramway Society as Ballarat number 31 (in Bendigo livery)
