= P class Melbourne tram =

P-class
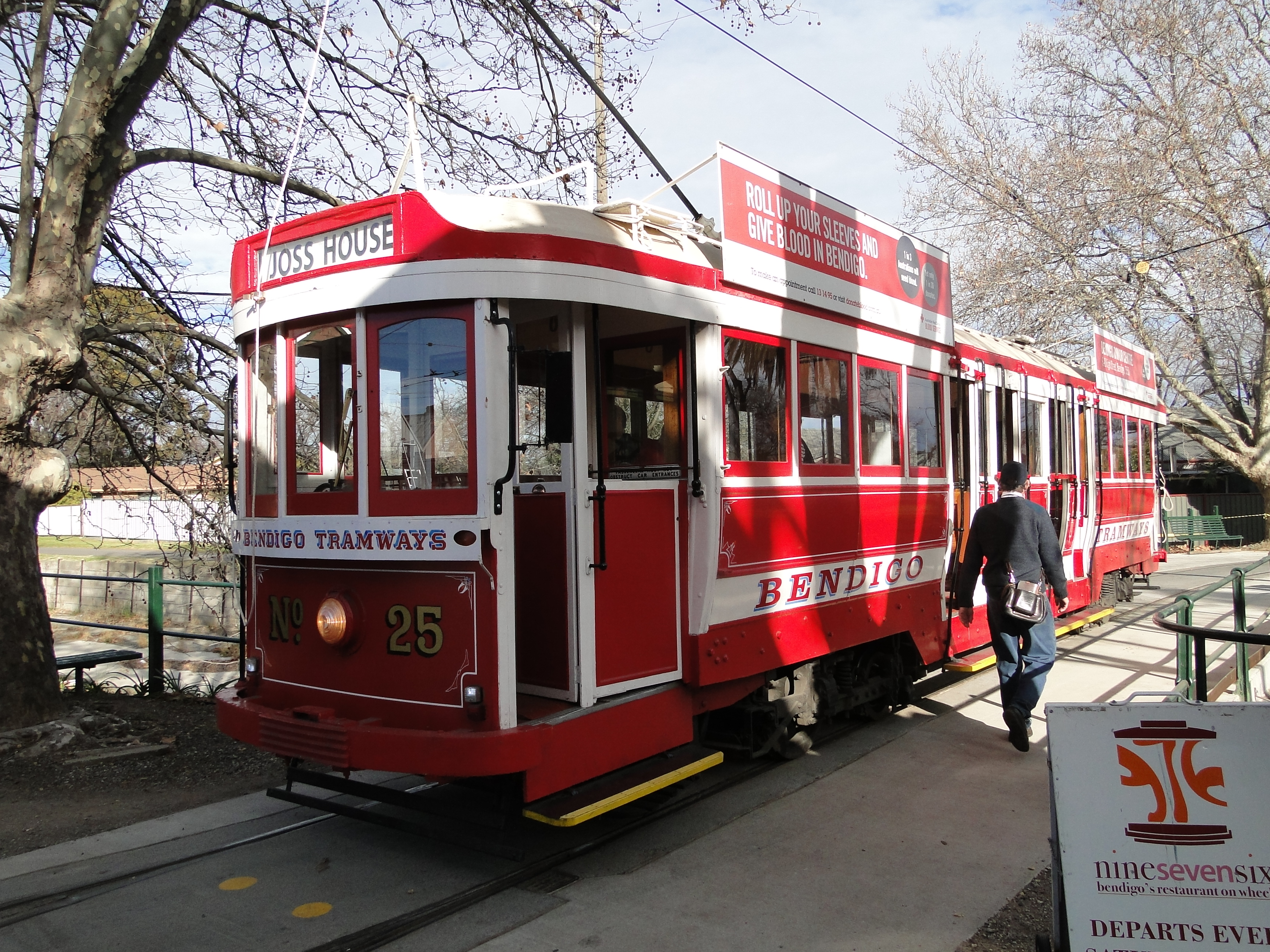
- Manufacturer: Duncan & Fraser
- Assembly: Adelaide
- Constructed: 1917/18
- Number built: 8
- Fleet numbers: 131-138
- Capacity: 52 (as built); 44 (as modified)

Specifications
- Car length: 13.85 m (45 ft 5 in)
- Width: 2.62 m (8 ft 7 in)
- Height: 3.10 m (10 ft 2 in)
- Wheel diameter: 838 mm (33.0 in) (driving); 508 mm (20.0 in) (pony)
- Weight: 17.9 tonnes
- Traction motors: GE 201G (2 x 65 hp (48 kW))
- Power supply: 600 Volts DC
- Current collection: Trolley pole
- Bogies: Robison 22E
- Track gauge: 1,435 mm (4 ft 8 1/2 in)

The P-class was a class of eight trams built by Duncan & Fraser, Adelaide for the Hawthorn Tramway Trust (HTT) as numbers 25 to 32. All passed to the Melbourne & Metropolitan Tramways Board on 2 February 1920 when it took over the HTT becoming the P-class and being renumbered 131 to 138.

These were Maximum Traction bogie tramcars of the drop-end-and-centre design (precursors of the Melbourne W class trams), with four doorways in the open centre (smokers') compartment as well as one at the front and another at the rear; each of the two passenger saloons featured four side windows. The cars were very similar to trams built by Duncan & Fraser for the contemporary Prahran & Malvern Tramways Trust (P&MTT) in 1913/14, which had three saloon windows, a larger smokers' compartment, and three centre doorways. One feature that differentiated these tramcars from other HTT and P&MTT trams was the large cylindrical destination equipment mounted on the roof of each driving cab; these were quite unlike anything else in Melbourne, containing a glass cylinder upon which the various destinations were painted and internally illuminated.

In 1916, the HTT had placed into service the first ten N class cars, and when the Trust ordered eight more to the same design, they specified that more leg room was to be provided in the open drop-centre smokers' compartment resulting in those trams being 1 foot (305 mm) longer than the first ten. This group of eight cars entered service for the Trust between July 1917 and late January 1918.

After the M&MTB take-over, the original HTT French grey livery was replaced by a brown colour scheme and fleet number of each tramcar was increased by 106; a simplification of the alphanumeric classification scheme saw the whole class being added to the C class (which had originally been allocated to the 1913 P&MTT Maximum Traction bogie trams). Improvements over the following years included the fitting of route number boxes, and roof-mounted destination boxes being replaced by the standard Melbourne boxes; seating capacity was reduced to 44 when an aisle was cut-through the drop centre cross-bench seats. By the 1930s when they had been painted in the standard Melbourne green colours, these trams resembled a smaller version of the ubiquitous Melbourne W class trams. Tramcars that survived to serve during World War II had their rear doorways blanked-off as a safety measure.

Numbers 134 and 136 (and possibly 131) were stored as surplus to requirements in the late 1930s; all three were scrapped and the bodies sold between March 1944 and January 1945. Car 137 had also been stored at the same time, but was overhauled in April 1943, and pressed back into passenger service. In October 1945, numbers 132 and 138 were sold for further use to the Ballarat and Bendigo tramways respectively. Number 137 followed to Ballarat in January 1947, along with numbers 133 and 135 to Bendigo in February and March that year.

== Preservation ==
Five have been preserved:

- 132 by the Tramway Museum Society of Victoria as Ballarat number 36
- 133 by the Bendigo Tramways as number 25
- 135 by the Bendigo Tramways as number 26
- 137 by the Tramway Museum, St Kilda as Ballarat number 34
- 138 by the Bendigo Tramways as P 138
