= V class Melbourne tram =

V-class
- Manufacturer: Duncan & Fraser
- Assembly: Adelaide
- Constructed: 1906
- Number built: 5
- Fleet numbers: 212-216
- Capacity: 32

Specifications
- Car length: 9.72 m (31 ft 11 in)
- Width: 2.64 m (8 ft 8 in)
- Height: 3.25 m (10 ft 8 in)
- Wheel diameter: 838 mm (33.0 in)
- Weight: 10.5 tonnes
- Current collection: Trolley pole
- Bogies: JG Brill Company 21E
- Track gauge: 1,435 mm (4 ft 8 1/2 in)

The V-class was a class of five trams built by Duncan & Fraser, Adelaide from JG Brill Company kits for the North Melbourne Electric Tramway & Lighting Company (NMET) as numbers 11-15. All passed to the Melbourne & Metropolitan Tramways Board on 1 August 1922 when it took over the NMET becoming the V-class and renumbered 212-216.

== Preservation ==
One has been preserved:

- 214 as part of the VicTrack heritage fleet at Hawthorn depot
