= T class Melbourne tram =

T-class
- Manufacturer: Duncan & Fraser
- Assembly: Adelaide
- Constructed: 1917
- Number built: 6
- Fleet numbers: 177-182
- Capacity: 38 (as built); 36 (as modified)

Specifications
- Car length: 10.67 m (35 ft 0 in)
- Width: 2.45 m (8 ft 0 in)
- Height: 3.16 m (10 ft 4 in)
- Wheel diameter: 838 mm (33.0 in)
- Wheelbase: 2.74 m (9 ft 0 in)
- Weight: 11.6 tonnes
- Current collection: Trolley pole
- Bogies: J. G. Brill Company Radiax
- Track gauge: 1,435 mm (4 ft 8 1/2 in)

The T-class was a class of six trams built by Duncan & Fraser, Adelaide for the Melbourne, Brunswick & Coburg Tramways Trust (MBCTT) as numbers 13-18. All passed to the Melbourne & Metropolitan Tramways Board on 2 February 1920 when it took over the MBCTT. They were then designated T-class and renumbered 177-182.

== Preservation ==
Two have been preserved:

- 179 is privately owned in regional Victoria.
- 180 by the Tramway Museum Society of Victoria
