= Duncan & Fraser =

Duncan & Fraser Limited
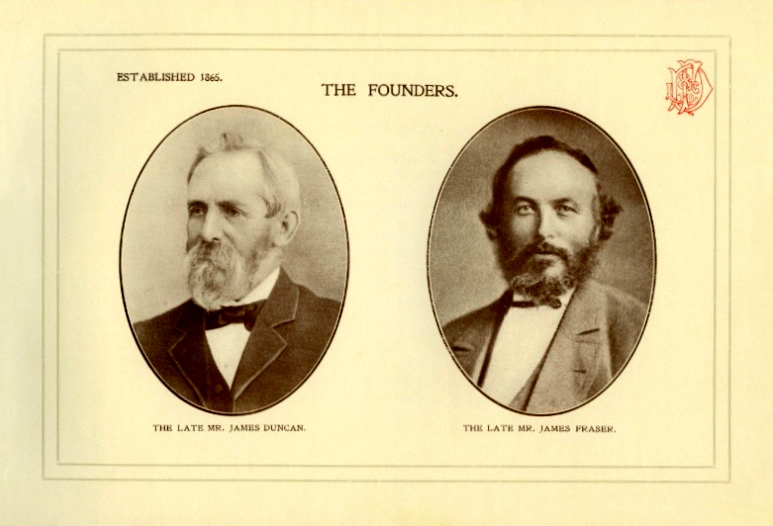
- James Duncan & James Fraser, founders of Duncan & Fraser
- Founded: January 1865
- Founder: James Duncan; James Fraser
- Defunct: August 1927
- Headquarters: Adelaide
- Products: Horse-drawn carriages and tram bodies Railway carriages Electric tram bodies Motor vehicle bodies

Duncan & Fraser Limited was a vehicle manufacturing company founded in 1865 in Adelaide, South Australia that built horse-drawn carriages and horse trams, and subsequently bodies for trains, electric trams and motor cars, becoming one of the largest carriage building companies in Australia.

In 1919 the company decided to abandon coachbuilding and confine itself to automotive manufacture; by 1927 the construction of Ford Model T motor car bodies had become the company's principal activity and the company was operating automotive distributorships and dealerships. However, the succeeding Ford Model A required an all-steel body, which Ford's US headquarters decided would be made in Canada and assembled in Ford's own factory in Geelong. Since most of the company's income had consequently ceased, the shareholders voted in August 1927 to close the company.

== Horse-drawn carriages ==
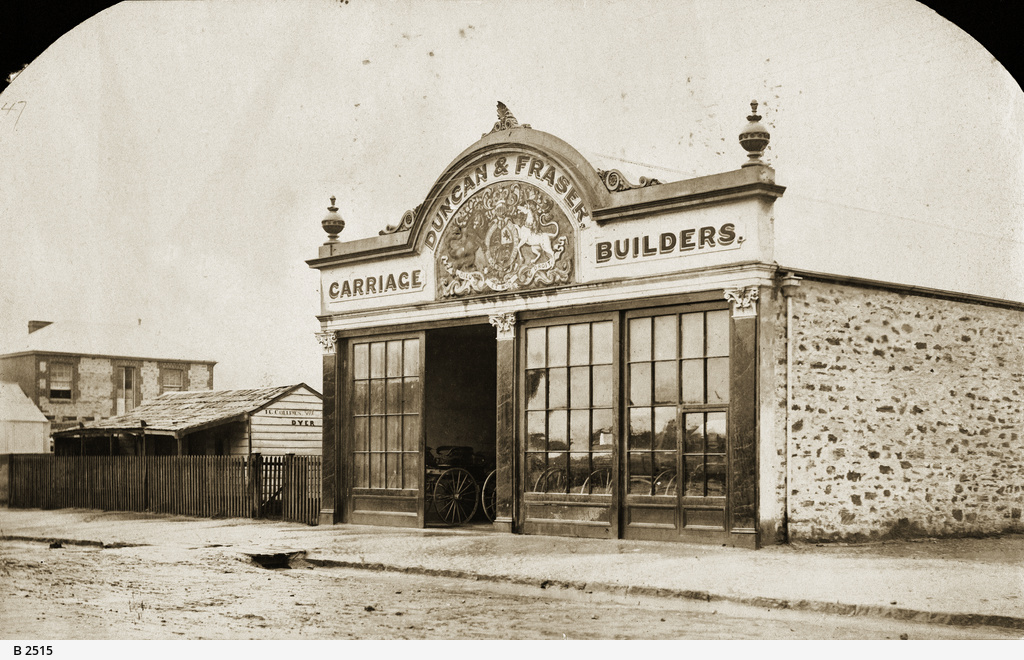
Duncan & Fraser's premises on Franklin Street, circa 1860s.

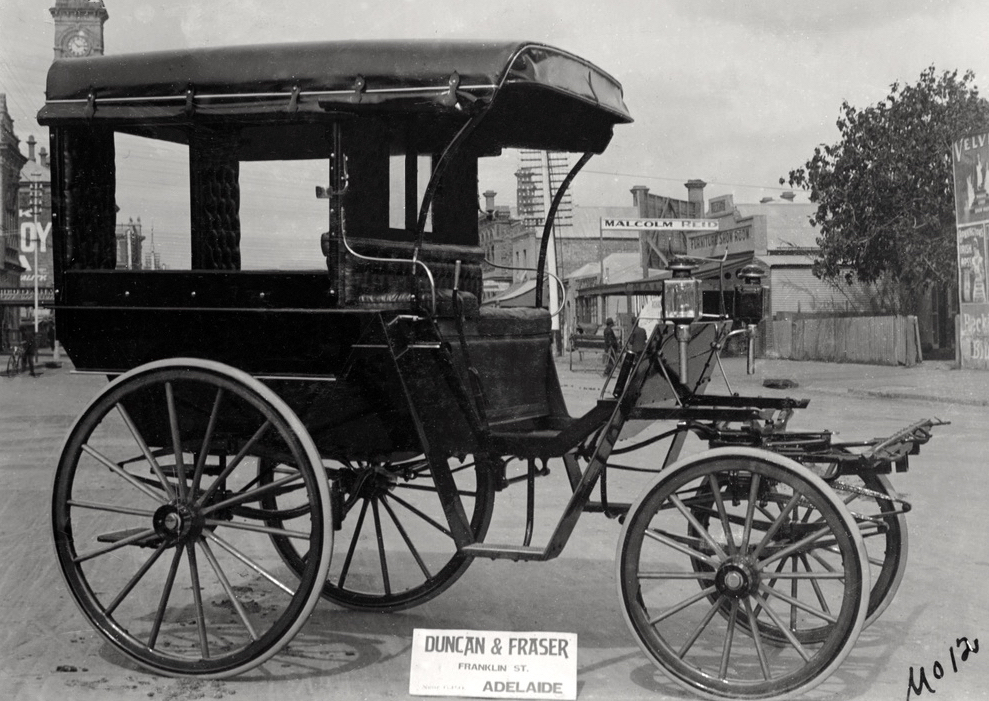
A wagonette manufactured by Duncan & Fraser, outside the company's factory at 42 Franklin Street in 1905. This type was widely used to pick up passengers from horse trams.

In January 1865, coach builder James Duncan and coach painter James Fraser – Scottish immigrants to Adelaide, South Australia – formed a private company, Duncan and Fraser Limited. They operated initially out of a workshop at 37 Franklin Street, Adelaide, with six tradesmen employees, but as they expanded the range of their products their business outgrew the premises and in January 1870 they moved to a newly constructed building with a 100-foot (30 metre) frontage at number 42 on the opposite (north) side of Franklin Street.

At the first Intercolonial Exhibition, held in Sydney in 1869, Duncan & Fraser competed against some of the oldest companies in the Commonwealth, and secured the first prize. The impetus saw their turnover double in one year.

== Railway carriages ==
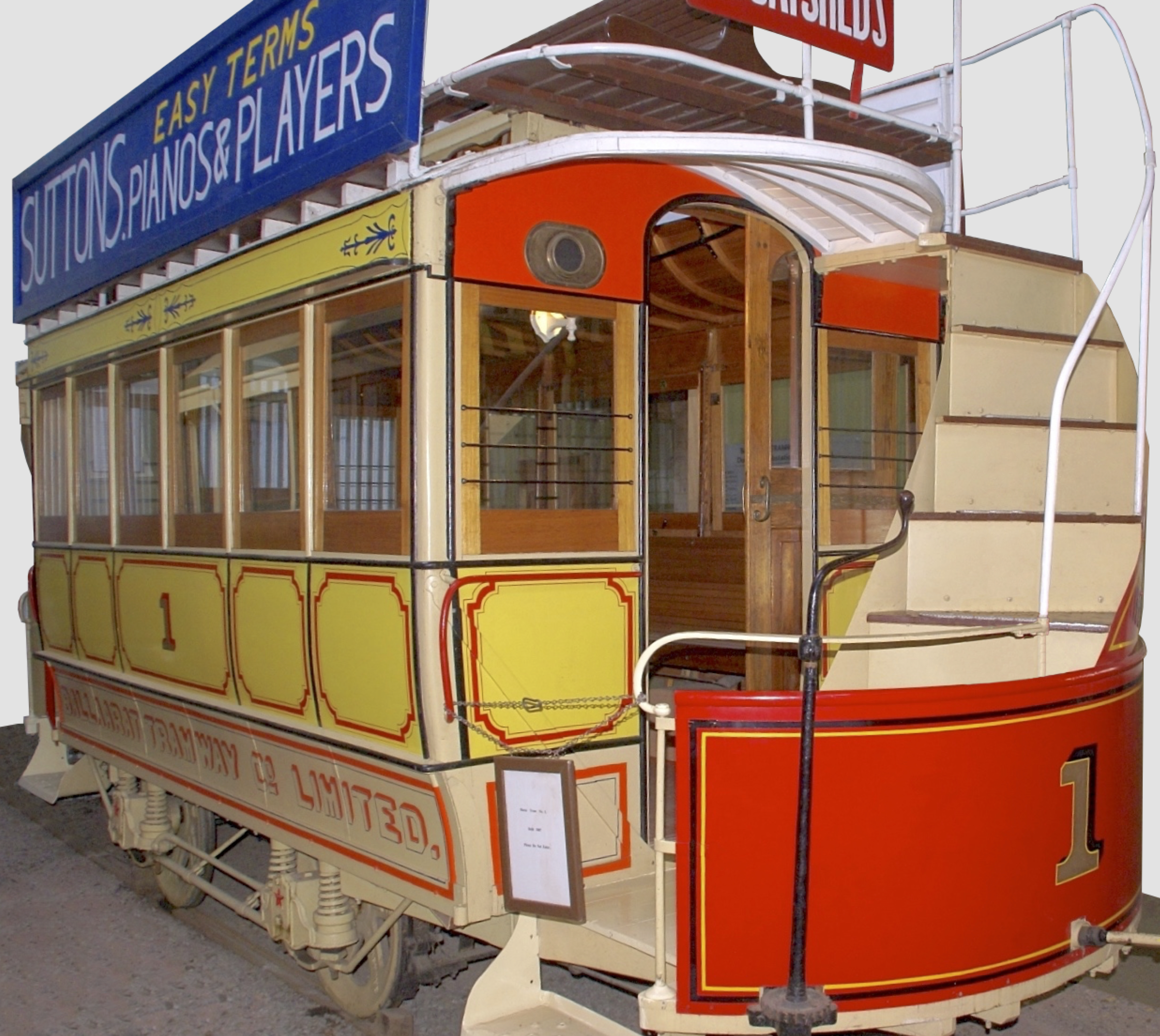
A Duncan & Fraser horse tram built in 1887 for the Ballarat Tramway

In 1873 Duncan & Fraser were commissioned to build two railway carriages for the Adelaide, Glenelg & Suburban Railway Company.

== Trams ==
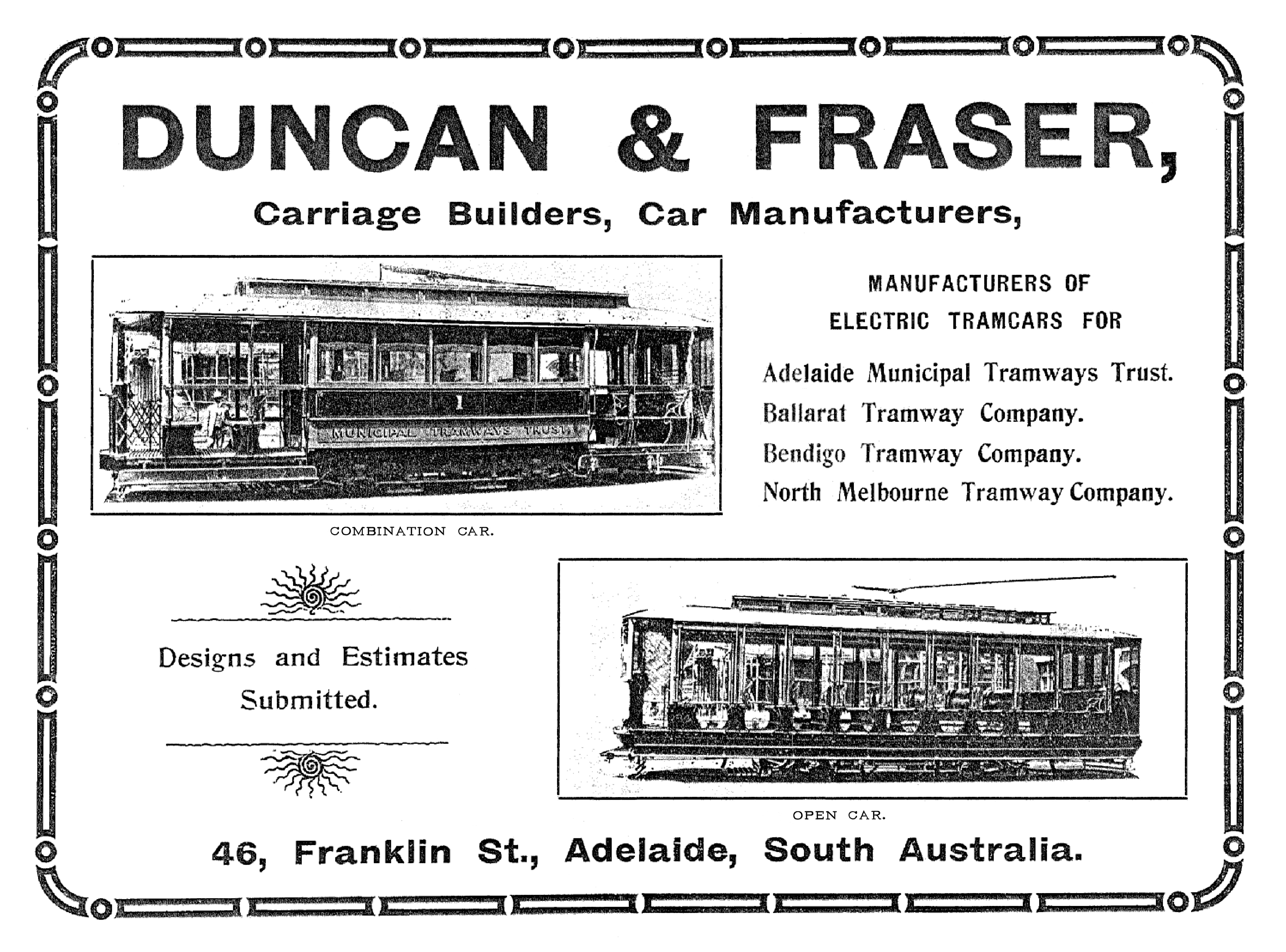
This Duncan & Fraser newspaper advertisement showed two types of tram cars built for Adelaide's Municipal Tramways Trust in 1908–09.

In 1876 and 1877 the company assembled Adelaide's first 20 horse-drawn trams imported by the Adelaide & Suburban Tramway Company from John Stephenson & Co, New York, United States. During the next quarter century the firm became one of the largest carriage building companies in Australia, building in addition to horse-drawn carriages, many hundreds of horse trams for companies in South Australia and Victoria.

In 1884, 16 acres of land was secured adjacent to the Port Adelaide railway line at Kilkenny. After Fraser died in August 1886, Duncan bought out his share from his widow. However, the trading name remained unchanged.

Duncan & Fraser diversified into the construction of tram bodies, becoming one of the largest carriage building companies in Australia. The company completed 120 A, B, C and D types for the Adelaide network as well as A, C, D, E, F, G, H, M, N, O, P, S, T, U and V class trams for the Melbourne network. It also built trams for the State Electricity Commission of Victoria's Ballarat, Bendigo and Geelong systems.

In 1913 the business was incorporated into a limited liability company in keeping with its increasing scope.

In 1919 the company decided to abandon coachbuilding and confine itself to automotive manufacture.

== Cars ==
=== Bodies ===
In 1900 Duncan & Fraser completed its first automobile body for Lewis Cycle Works.

=== Dealerships ===
In May 1903 Duncan & Fraser secured the Oldsmobile automobile agency. A showroom, complete with a salesman, spare parts, accessories, clothing and driving instruction was established, a first for South Australia. In 1906, the existing factory was replaced by a new two storey factory. After Duncan died on 2 July 1908, the business was taken over by his four sons, James, Robert, Archie and Richard. Duncan & Fraser secured more automobile agencies, including the Orient Buckboard, Argyll, Standard, Singer, Chalmers and BSA.

=== Ford ===
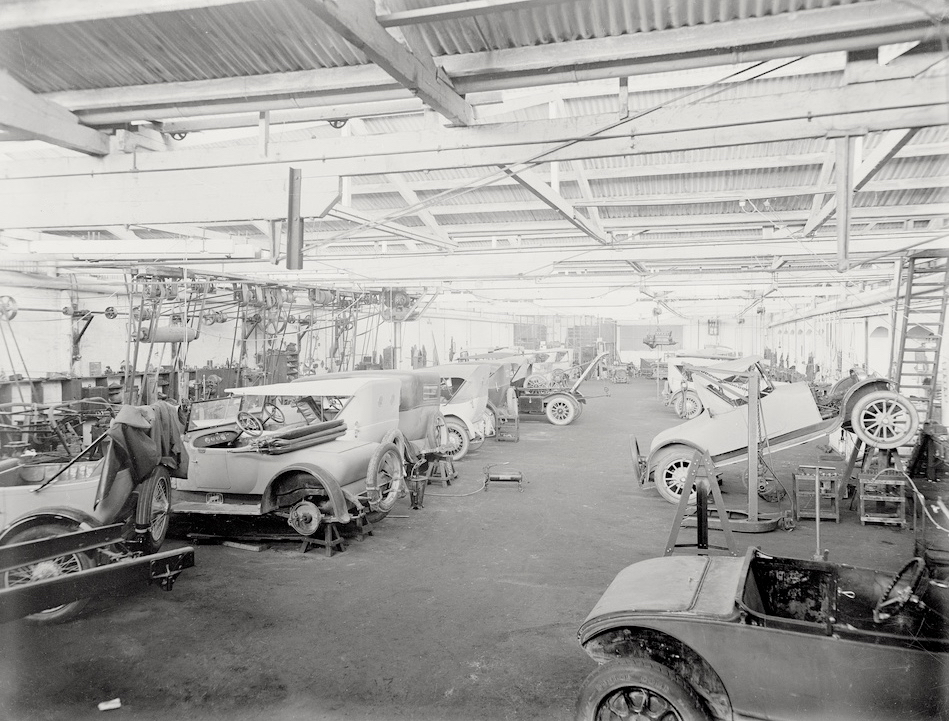
Cars being repaired in a Duncan & Fraser workshop about 1925

In August 1909, it secured the sole distributorship for the Ford Model T for South Australia and Broken Hill.

Ford Canada was unhappy about most of the Australian Ford distributors selling other makes. Thus Duncan & Fraser annexed the Ford agency. In October 1920 Duncan Motors was formed to sell and service all Ford products with Duncan & Fraser selling all other makes. In the early 1920s Duncan & Fraser secured the Studebaker car agency. The Kilkenny site was sold to Holden Motor Bodies and a new factory specially designed to manufacture cars built in Mile End. Rectangular in shape, it allowed for an assembly line type process, similar to the system implemented in 1913 by Henry Ford in Detroit to manufacture the Ford Model T.

On 21 February 1923, the Franklin Street factory was destroyed by fire. Temporary buildings and workshops were rented in various parts of Adelaide. A new three storey factory opened on the Frankilin Street site in August 1924. In March 1925 the Ford Australia was established in Geelong, with bodies initially built by Duncan & Fraser and supplied through Duncan Motors. By May 1926 body panels were being imported by Ford Australia directly from Ford Canada and assembled in Geelong.

In August 1927, Ford Canada announced that production of the Ford Model T would cease. Ford Australia followed suit a week later. All the Ford agents including Duncan Motors were informed that they would not have any Ford cars to sell for an estimated 12 months whilst the factories in retooled for the new Model A.

== Voluntary liquidation ==
Faced with no Ford bodies to build and no Fords to sell and because Duncan & Fraser's other car agencies were unprofitable the directors decided to recommend to the shareholders that the business be wound up in August 1927.

Duncan & Fraser's premises were taken over by competitor TJ Richards & Sons during the Great Depression of the 1930s.

== Gallery ==
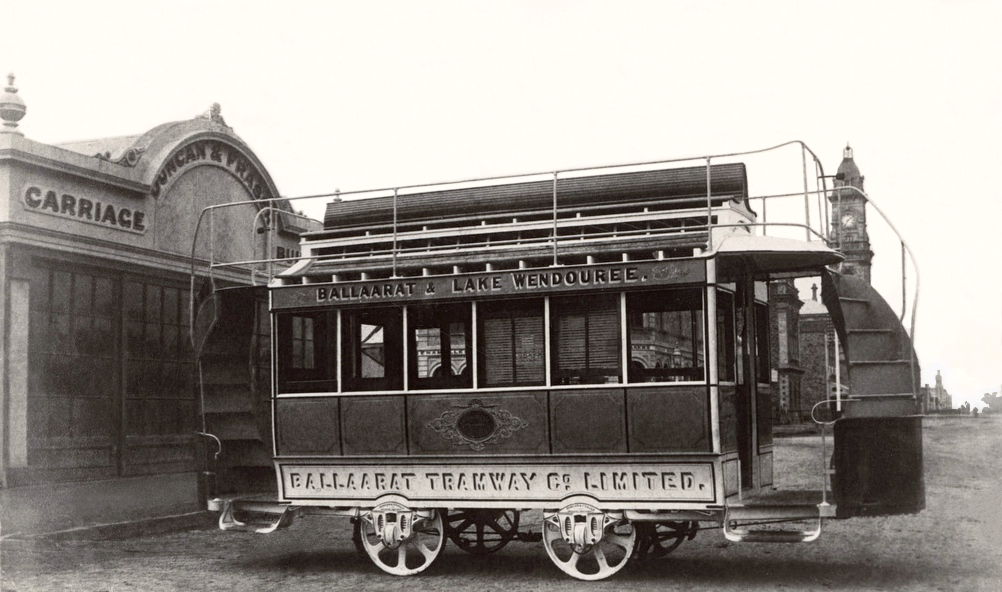
A horse tram, newly built for the Ballaarat Tramway Co. Limited, Victoria, outside Duncan & Fraser factory.

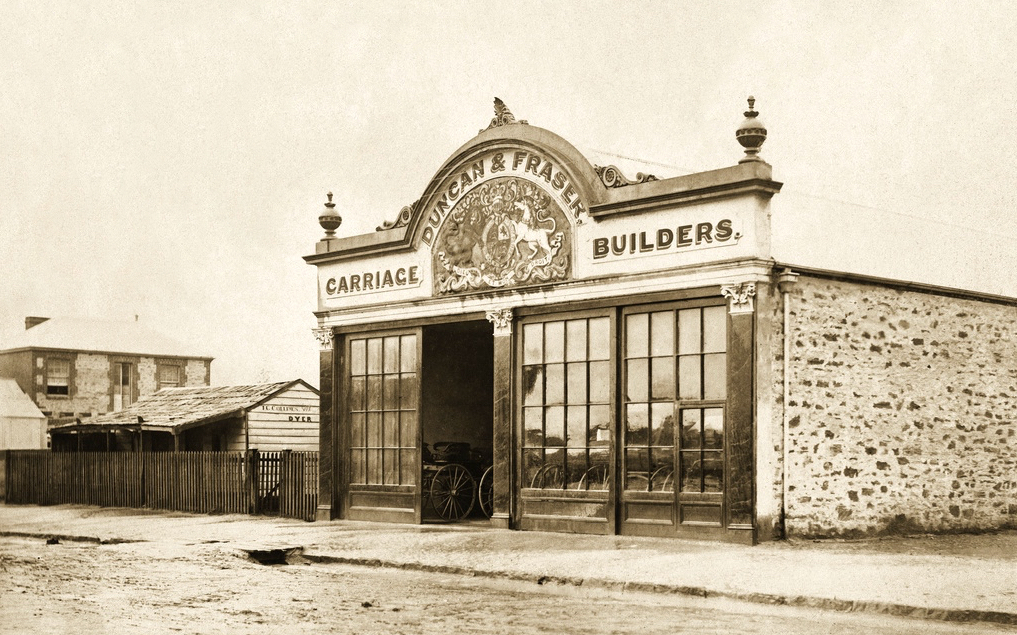
Duncan & Fraser's first premises at 37 Franklin Street, Adelaide. The large Royal Arms were subsequently removed.

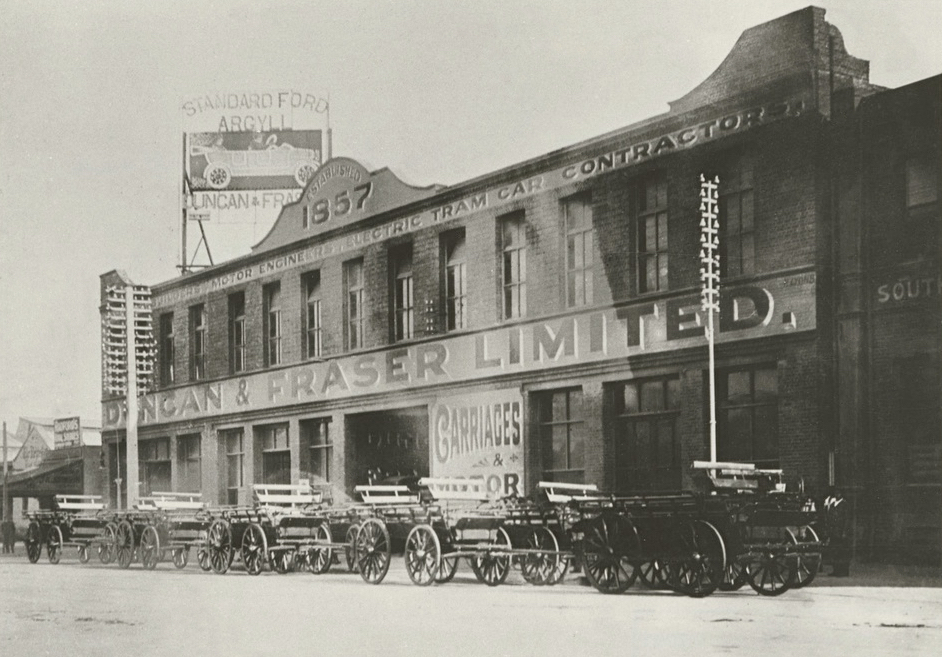
General service wagons built for the Australian Army in 1915 for World War 1, outside the Duncan & Fraser factory at 46 Franklin Street

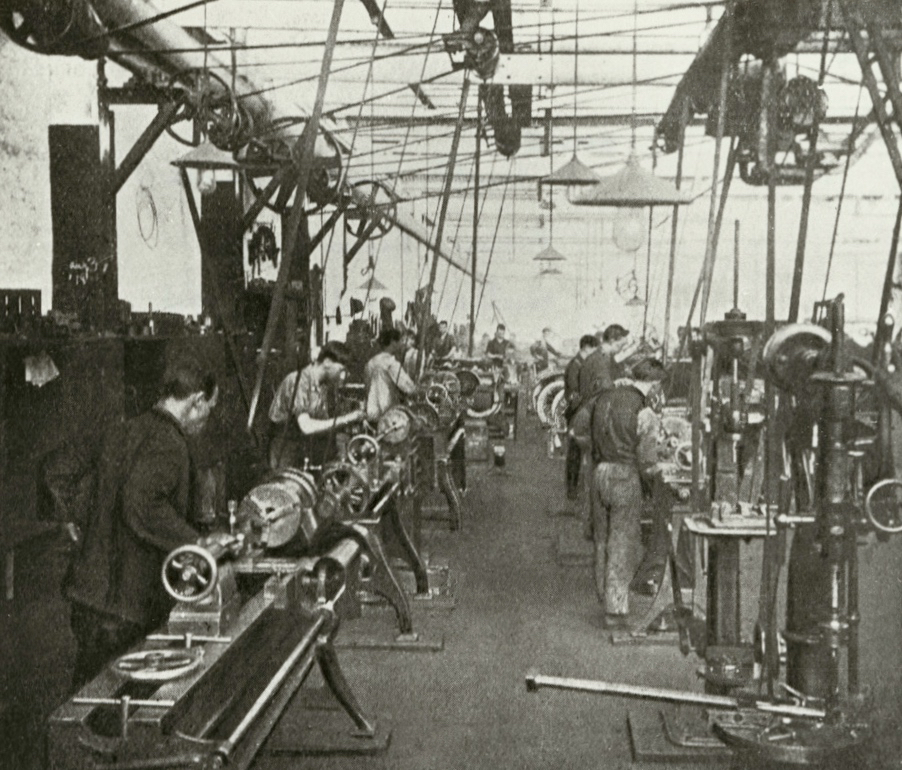
Machinery in Duncan and Fraser's automotive workshop

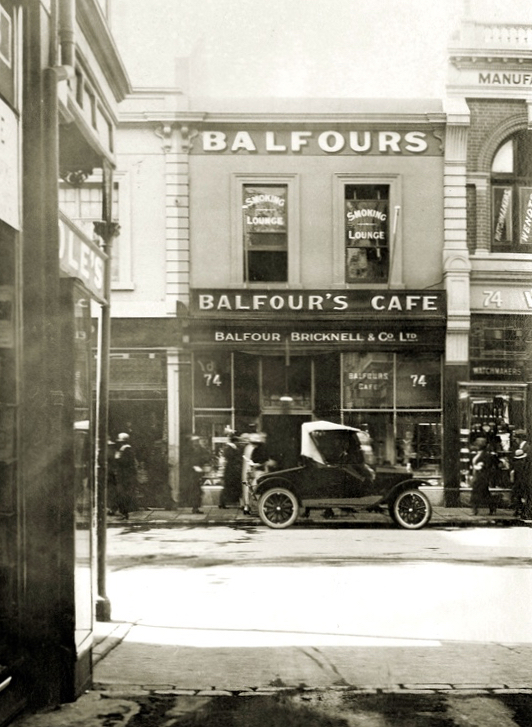
A 1922 Ford Model T roadster built by Duncan and Fraser outside Balfour's cafe in Rundle Street, Adelaide, 19 February 1924

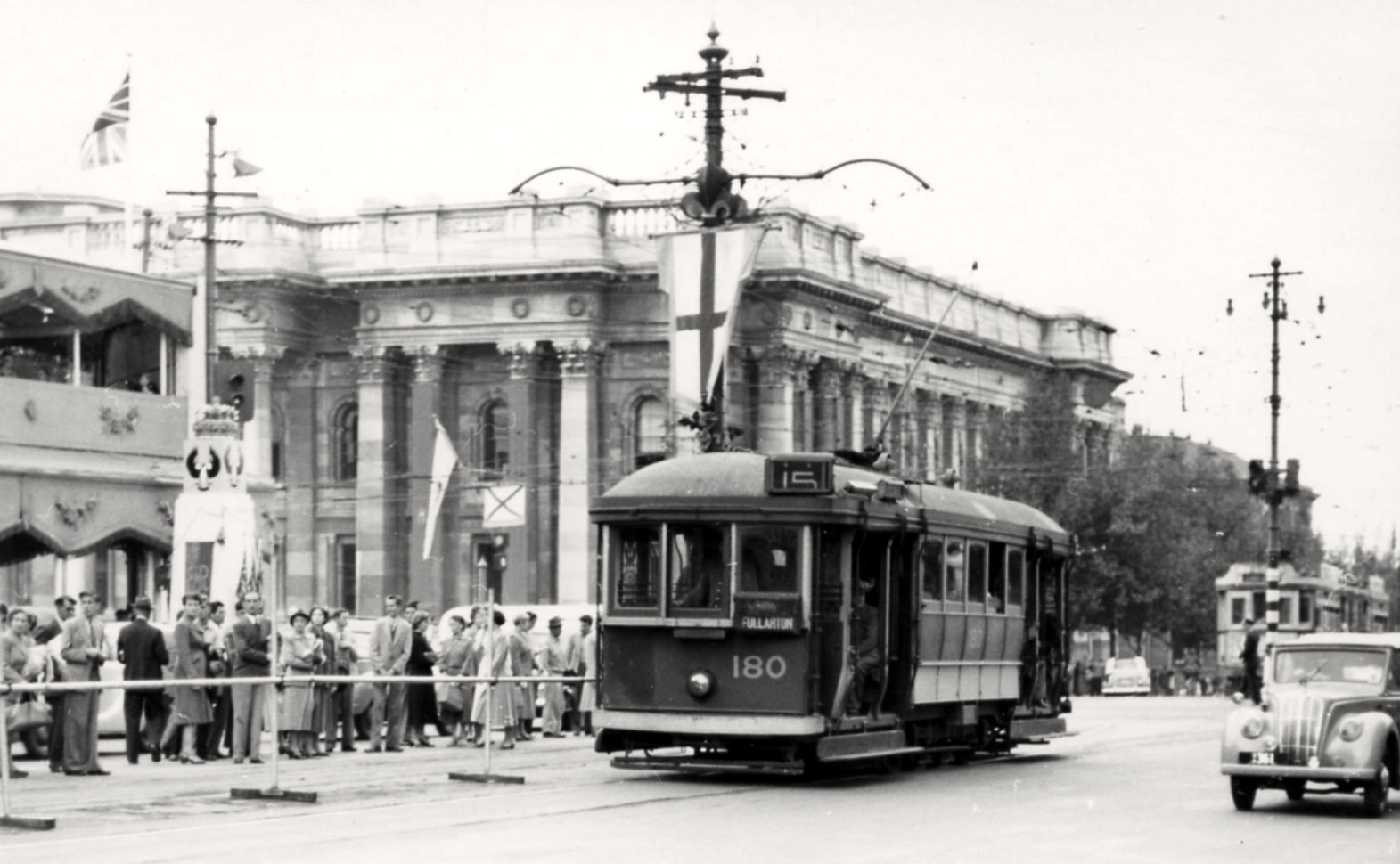
After 40 years of building the majority of Adelaide's trams, the Type C of 1918–19 were Duncan and Fraser's last
