= Trams in Ballarat =

Ballarat Tramways
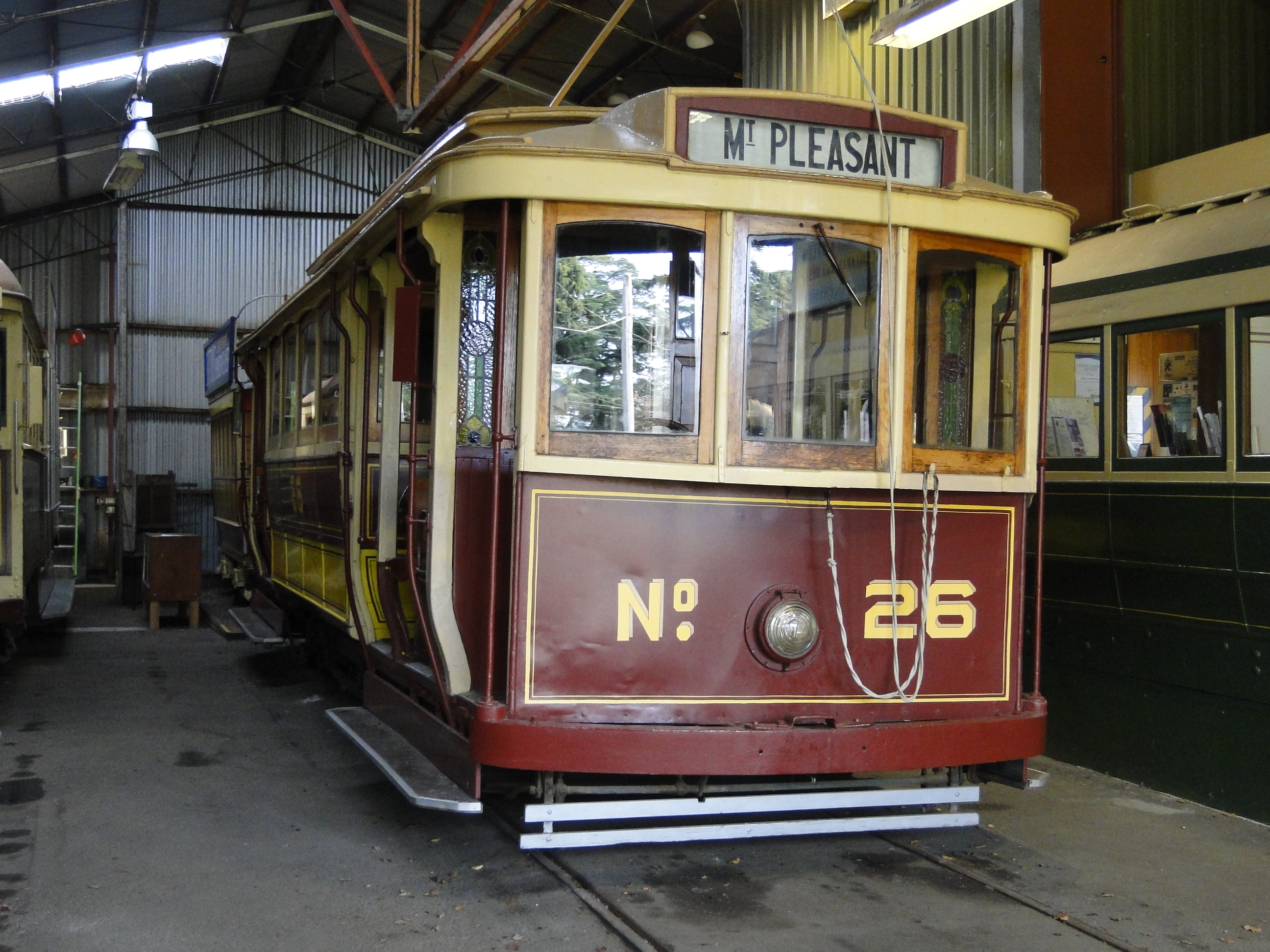
- Ballarat Tram No.26 in the Wendouree Depot

Operation
- Locale: Ballarat, Victoria, Australia

Statistics
Ballarat Tramway Company era: 1887–1902
- Operator: Ballarat Tramway Company
- Track gauge: 1,435 mm (4 ft 8 1/2 in)
- Propulsion system: Horse
- Depot: Gillies Street
- Track length (total): 6
Electric Supply Company of Victoria era: 1902–1934
- Operator: Electric Supply Company of Victoria
- Track gauge: 1,435 mm (4 ft 8 1/2 in)
- Propulsion system: Electricity
SECV era: 1934–1971
- Operator: State Electricity Commission of Victoria (SECV)
- Track gauge: 1,435 mm (4 ft 8 1/2 in) standard gauge
- Propulsion system: Electric
Ballarat Tramway Museum era: 1 February 1975–Present
- Track gauge: 1,435 mm (4 ft 8 1/2 in) standard gauge
- Track length (total): 0.85

Trams in Ballarat were first used for public transport in 1887. They ceased to operate as a means of public transport in 1971, but a section continues to be operated today as a tourist attraction.

At its peak in 1937, the Ballarat tramway network was the largest in Australia operating outside one of the capital cities, with 7 principal routes and more than 24 kilometres (15 mi) of track.

Most of the network was closed and replaced with buses on 19 September 1971 after which the Ballarat Tramway Museum preserved a single electrified track along Wendouree Parade at Lake Wendouree to operate a tourist service. From its depot adjacent to the Ballarat Botanical Gardens, the museum operates its historic collection of electric trams from around Australia, including some that were operated on the original Ballarat system.

== 1880s – origins and the horse-drawn tramway ==
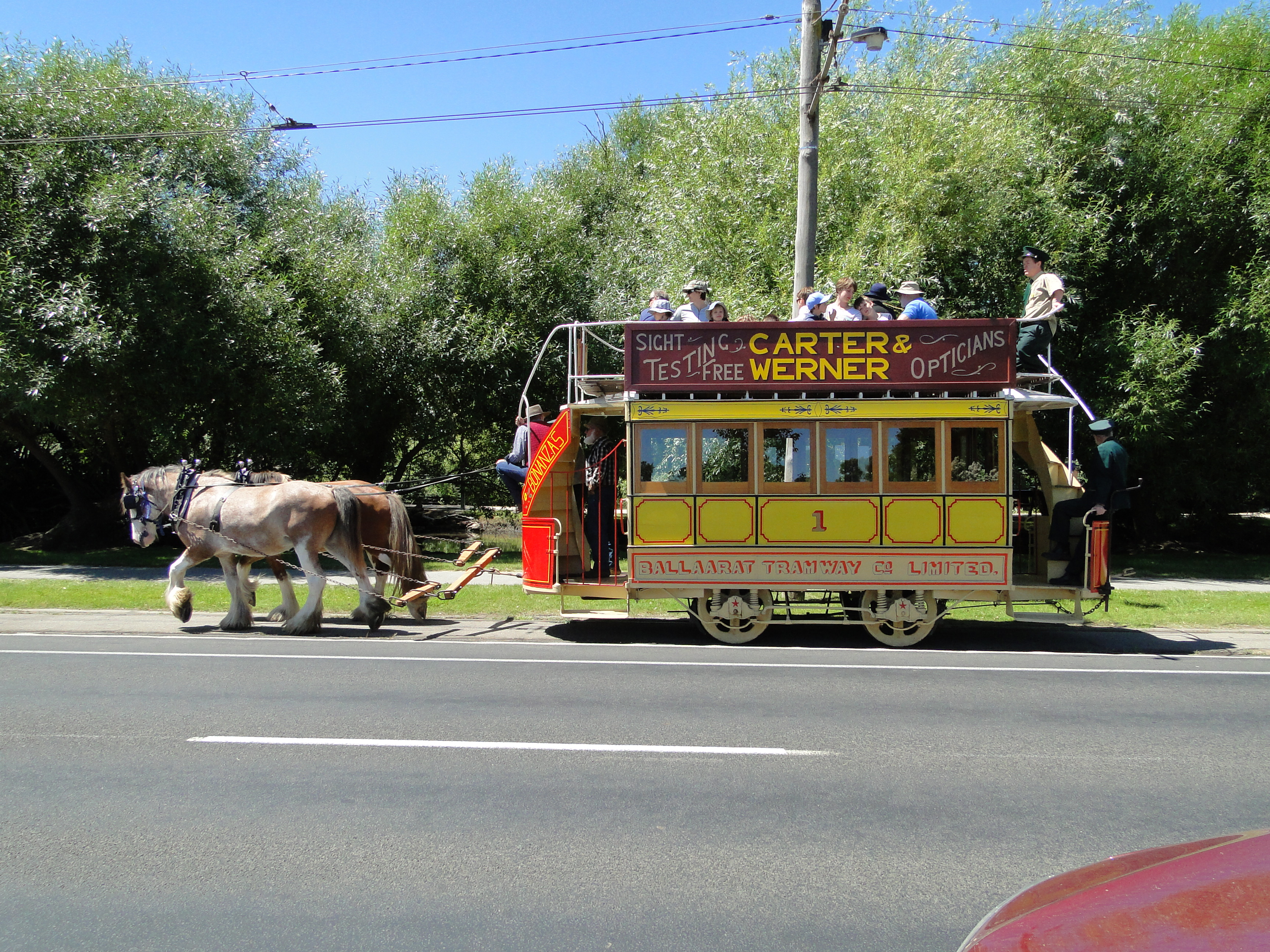
Ballarat horse tram on 125th anniversary of the opening, 26 December 2012

In an 1884 council meeting, the City of Ballaarat decided on the establishment of a tramway to meet the growing city's transport needs and a Tramway Committee was formed.

Tenders were called in 1886 to operate a tramway in the city. The successful tenderer was Mr. Thompson, of Adelaide who proposed a horse drawn system. He was granted a 30-year licence for the sum of £1575 per annum, after which the system would be handed to the council. Provision was to be made in future for the rolling stock being powered by other means.

Thompson and business partner Moore formed the Ballarat Tramway Company which built and promoted the tramway. The first line was opened at a banquet in the Botanical Gardens on 26 December 1887. The six mile (9.7 km) standard gauge line ran from Sturt Street to the gardens and around Lake Wendouree. The rolling stock consisted of double-decker trams built in Adelaide, each drawn by multiple horses. The company constructed and operated a maintenance facility north of the gardens.

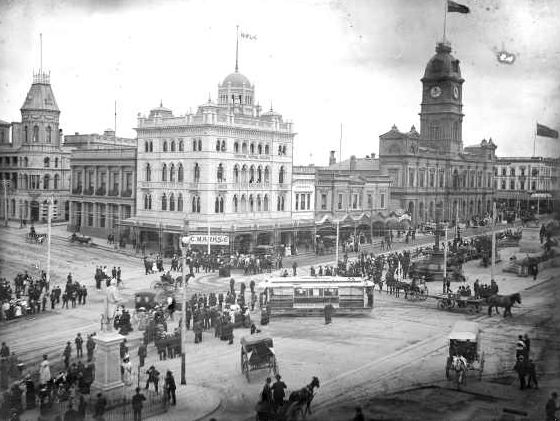
Tram on the Soldiers Hill line at the corner of Lydiard and Sturt Street c.1905

The tramway was immediately popular and it was not long before work began on extensions for the southern branch line to the town of Sebastopol via Skipton Street Redan and Albert Street, and two northern branch lines to service the city's suburbs along Drummond Street North and Soldiers Hill.

At its peak, the horse-drawn system had 19 trams, servicing 5 principal routes: Drummond Street; Gardens; Lydiard Street; Sebastopol; Sturt Street West. All were double decker, with the exception of the Drummond Street tram.

== 1900s – electrification ==
In November 1900, the Ballarat City Council gave permission to the British Insulated Wire Company Limited to build an electric tram network. The building was done by its subsidiary, the Electric Supply Company of Victoria, which was also to supply electricity to the town. A bluestone power station was built at the corner of Ripon Street and Wendouree Parade in 1901 to provide the electricity supply. The company took over the running of the horse trams from the Ballarat Tramway Company in December 1902, and work on the electric network began in November 1904 and the first electric trams went into service on 18 August 1905. The whole tramway was electrified and the rolling stock was replaced by electric trams operated by the Electric Supply Company of Victoria. The last horse tram ran in August 1913 on the Sebastopol line which was officially opened as an electric tramway on 14 August 1913.

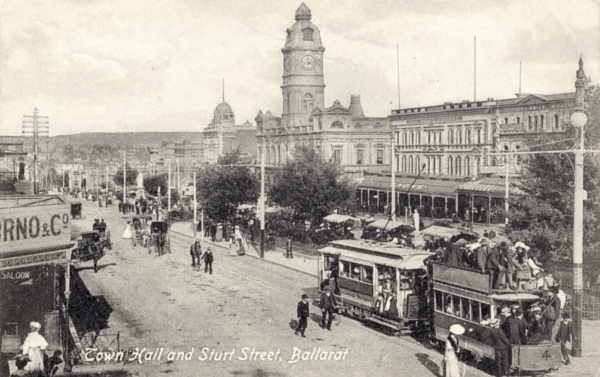
Electrified on Sturt Street near the Town Hall in 1917.

== 1930s – SECV era ==
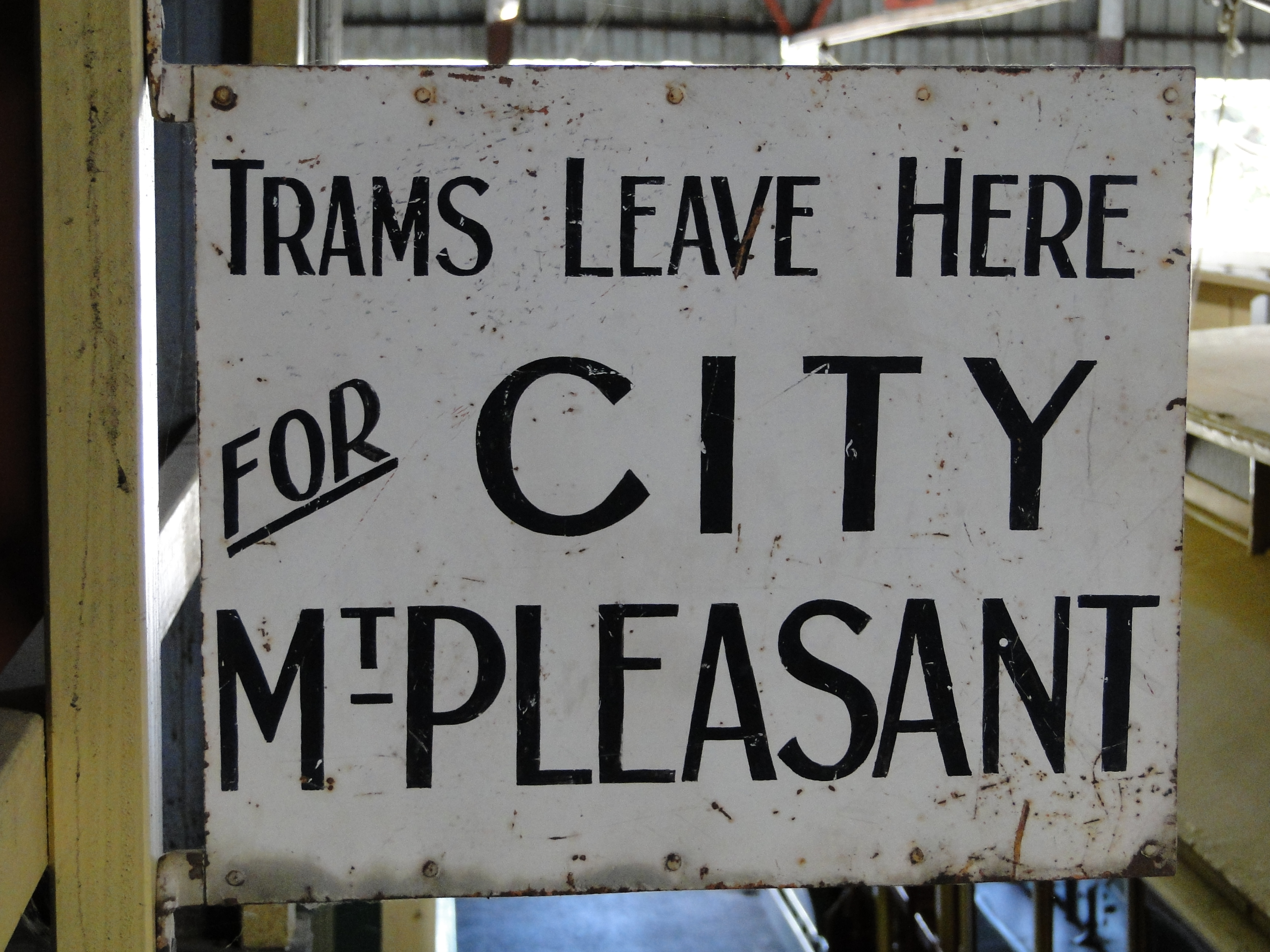
Old sign from the Ballarat tramways

The State Electricity Commission of Victoria (SECV) acquired the network in 1934.

In 1936, the state government proposed to extend the Lydiard Street route to the Ballaarat New Cemetery and Ballarat North.

Despite strong patronage, the system posted its first significant loss in 1937 of £6013. At the time, the Ballarat network was one of the largest such systems in Australia, behind that of Sydney (182 miles (293 km)), Melbourne (143 miles (230 km)), Brisbane (65 miles (105 km)), Perth (57 miles (92 km)), Adelaide (35 miles (56 km)) and Hobart (18 miles (29 km)), but larger than that of Newcastle, Launceston (11.3 miles (18.2 km)), Geelong (11 miles (18 km)) and Bendigo (8.1 miles (13.0 km)).

== 1970s – closure and preservation ==
Throughout the 1960s, passenger patronage fell and operating losses mounted. From 1962 onwards, the SECV and the Victorian government attempted to close the system but did not have the required parliamentary support in the Legislative Council. After winning control of the Legislative Council in the 1970 election, the Bolte government had the numbers to close the tramways in both Ballarat and Bendigo. In 1971 the government announced that the tramway system would be closed and replaced by buses. In September 1971, a large contingent of the Ballarat population turned out to farewell the last trams after the government systematically shut down the network.

In May 1971 the Lake Wendouree Tramway Museum Committee began negotiating with the SECV to continue to maintain a section of track. The Ballarat Tramway Preservation Society was also formed in 1971 to start, and run, an authentic tramway.

The Ballarat Tramway Preservation Society's original plan was to keep all the tramway that ran around the shores of Lake Wendouree. However, after discussions with the SECV and the City of Ballarat, only the section of track in the Botanical Gardens was retained. The first trip on the museum's tramway was in December 1974, and the track was officially opened on 1 February 1975. The first tram to run was Ballarat No. 40, which had been the last tram to run on the SECV network.

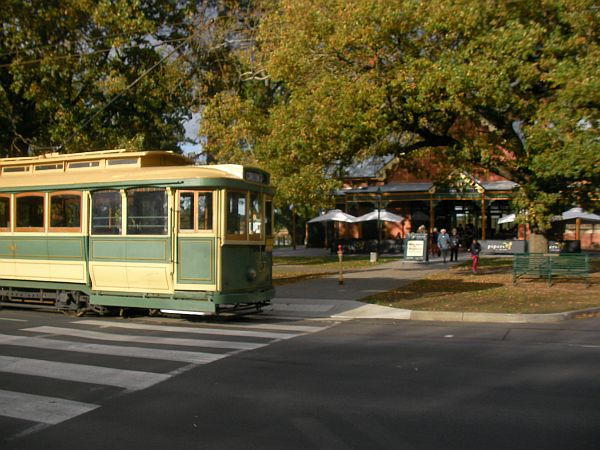
Ballarat Tramway Museum 33. (type that operated in the city in 1935 passing the Lake Pavilion on Wendouree Parade in 2009)

The Society changed its name to the Ballarat Tramway Museum. It operates trams on weekends, public and school holidays. In December 2014, the Museum installed an 18 kW solar power system, with 72 solar panels, which allows the trams to operate on renewable energy.

In 2018, 280 metres (920 ft) of the 1.3 km (0.81 mi) preserved tramway was replaced with new rails using the latest construction methods. This project replaced track laid in 1905.

== Revival proposals ==
Since the 1990s proposals have been put to the City of Ballarat to reinstate sections of the network. Many of these focus on trams as a major tourist transport facility and tourist attraction. Others support a return of trams as a viable component of the Ballarat public transport system. Proposed destinations include Ballarat railway station, Sovereign Hill, Lake Wendouree loop, Bridge Mall and Sturt Street.

In 2001 there was a strong push to reinstate a tram system. By mid-2001, a vocal lobby for a tourist route through the CBD had gained the support of the Australian Chamber of Commerce and Industry, Australian Hotels Association and the Ballarat operations of transport manufacturer Alstom. Financial assessments completed in 2002 deemed the $20 million project viable with a projected profit of $150,000 per annum, though dependent on a grant from the state and Commonwealth. Public support for it was also high. The chosen route would have run from Ballarat Railway station at Doveton Crescent, along Lydiard Street, down Mair Street, Peel Street, through the Llanberris reserve to Sovereign Hill and the Gold Museum. Ballarat City Council voted down the proposal in 2002, stating that the idea would not be reconsidered for at least a decade.

Submissions relating to the reinstatement of trams along Sturt Street during the City of Ballarat's CBD Strategy consultation in 2009. The project had been costed at $70 million and deemed as too expensive and inflexible for the local council to maintain in the final report.

The Sturt Street route proposal was dismissed by Ballarat MP and Regional Australia Minister Catherine King in the lead up to the 2013 Australian federal election, claiming that at a cost of $90 million, the project would be too expensive, indicating instead a preference to invest in local sporting facilities.

Calls were renewed in August 2014 with news that a feasibility study would be undertaken to extend Bendigo's network. A circuit route was proposed from Ballarat railway station to Lake Wendouree via Mair Street, Dawson Street, Sturt Street, Bridge Mall and Lydiard Street back to the railway station. However, this proposal once again met with ambivalence from the council and members of parliament over issues such as the route and cost, and no commitment to a project was forthcoming.

A discussion group on the reasons for an expanded Ballarat Tram Network has been formed.

== Historic extent of the network ==
Size of Network by year
1887	6 miles (9.7 km)
1934	10 miles (16 km)
1936	15.1 miles (24.3 km)
1975	0.85 miles (1.37 km)

At its peak, the Ballarat network included seven main routes some of which shared the same sections of track:

- Victoria Street
- Mount Pleasant
- Gardens via Drummond Street North
- Gardens via Sturt Street West
- Sebastopol
- Lydiard Street North
- View Point

The operation was mostly running recycled rolling stock from both Adelaide and Melbourne with a wide variety of tram models in service. Further background reading on the extent of the network can be found on Historical Tramways of Ballarat

== Surviving trams ==
There are a number of trams which operated on the Ballarat tramways which have survived, and some are still in service.

=== Ballarat Tramway Company ===
The Ballarat Tramway Company operated 18 horse-drawn trams in Ballarat. After the introduction of electric trams some horse trams were used as trailers and towed behind the electric trams. Tram 1 was used by the company to transport the crew's bicycles between the depot and the main terminus. It was then sold for use as a backyard shed. It was later rediscovered and returned to the Museum where it was extensively restored.

- Horse tram No.1 (1887) – in service Ballarat Tramway Museum (BTM)

=== Electric Supply Company ===
The Electric Supply Company operated 23 trams, including some that had been converted from old Sydney cable trams.

- Number 12 (1892–1905) – BTM being restored.
- Number 21 (1913) – The Tramway Museum St Kilda South Australia
- Number 22 (1913) – BTM restoration commenced, but now in storage.
- Number 23 (1913) – converted as scrubber 1934, static display TMSV.

=== SECV ===
The SECV purchased a large number of old trams from Melbourne, Port Adelaide, and Adelaide, which were then used in Geelong, Bendigo and Ballarat. Tram No. 37 was used in Melbourne, Geelong, and Bendigo before being moved to Ballarat in 1960.

- Number 11 (1915) – BTM in storage
- Number 12 (1915) – in service Sydney Tramway Museum (STM), Sydney
- Number 13 (1915) – in service BTM
- Number 14 (1915) – in service BTM
- Number 17 (1915) – in service Tramway Museum Society of Victoria (TMSV), at Bylands, Victoria
- Number 18 (1913) – in service BTM
- Number 19 (1915) – in service Bendigo Trust (BT)
- Number 20 (1918) – scrapped 1970
- Number 21 (1909) – in service Tramway Museum, St Kilda, Adelaide (TMSK)
- Number 25 (1916) – in service, BT
- Number 26 (1916) – in service BTM
- Number 27 (1916) – in service BTM
- Number 28 (1916) – in service BTM
- Number 30 (1917) – rebuilt following arson attack, in service at Astoria Riverfront Trolley, Oregon, USA.
- Number 31 (1917) – in service Perth Electric Tramway Museum at Whiteman Park, Western Australia. (PETS)
- Number 32 (1917) – BTM in storage
- Number 33 (1917) – in service BTM
- Number 34 (1917) – returned to BTM from TMSK and under restoration
- Number 35 (1916) – BTM, used for spare parts
- Number 36 (1917) – in service TMSV
- Number 37 (1916) – in service STM
- Number 38 (1914) – in service BTM
- Number 39 (1914) – BTM, body used as static display area.
- Number 40 (1913) – in service BTM
- Number 41 (1914) – static, used as a restaurant, Horsham, Victoria.
- Number 42 (1914) – static display TMSV
- Number 43 (1914) – static display TMSV

=== Ballarat Tramway Museum ===
As well as its collection of original Ballarat trams, the Ballarat Tramway Museum also has several Melbourne trams and an original Geelong tram:

=== Ex Melbourne Metropolitan Tramways Board ===
- No. 8W Scrubber (1935) – in service BTM
- No. 504 W2 class (1928) – painted art tram by Clifton Pugh – BTM in storage
- No. 661 W3 class (1932) – BTM in storage crash damaged
- No. 671 W4 class (1934) – in service BTM
- No. 924 SW6 class (1946) – BTM in storage
- No. 939 SW6 class (1948) – converted to Melbourne Restaurant Tram 3 – modified to BTM function tram "Cuthberts 939"
- No. 1029 W7 class (1956) – in service BTM
- No. 1039 W7 class (1956) – BTM in storage

=== Ex Melbourne Electric Supply Company (later SECV) – Geelong Tramway ===
- Number 2 (1912–1956) – in service BTM for special occasions

== Cycling controversy ==
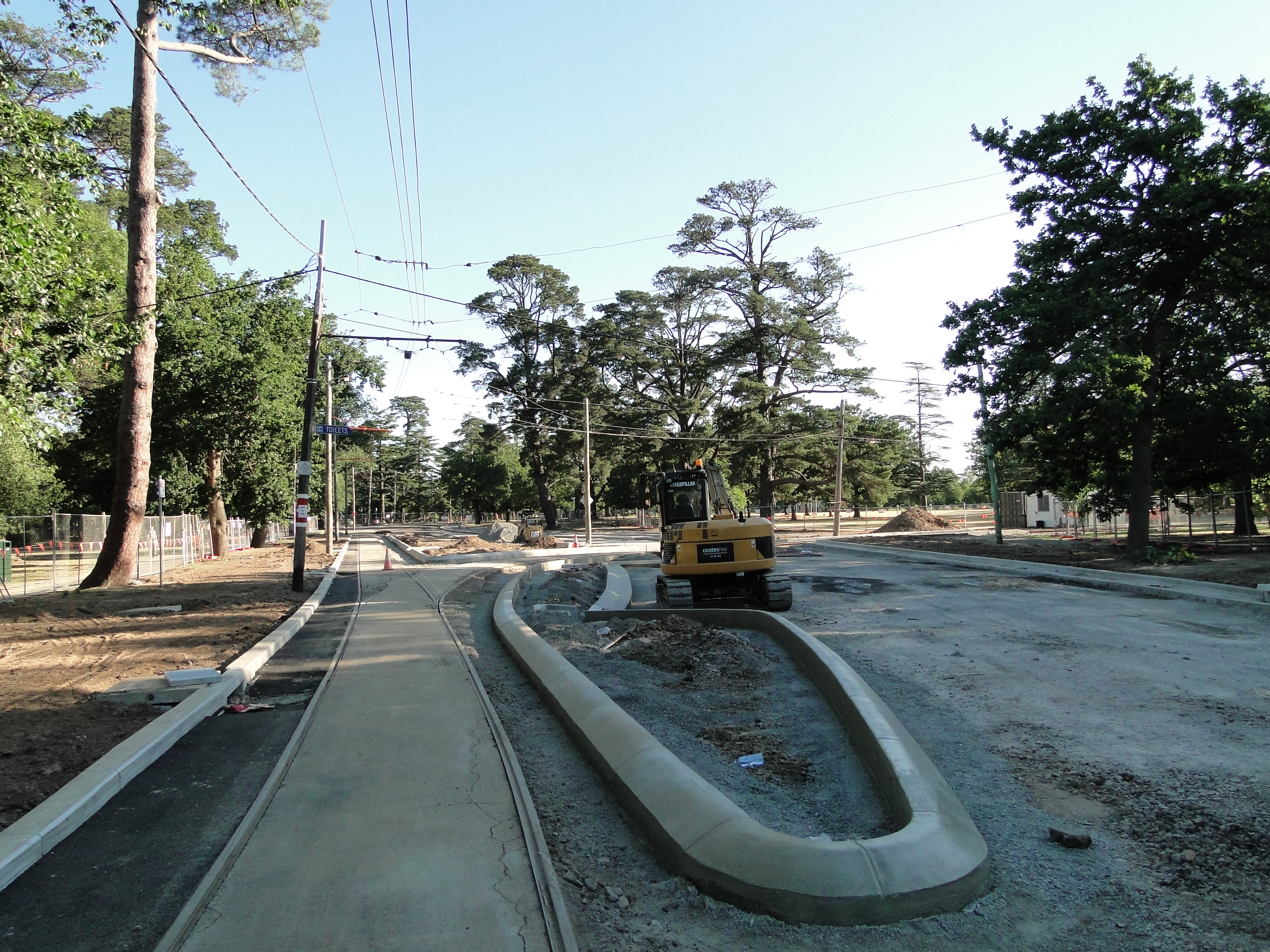
Roadworks in Ballarat, Victoria, to realign road and tram track crossing.

A section of track at Wendouree Parade has caused controversy since 2011 due to a notorious blackspot for cyclists—a curved track intersection emerging from the Tramway Museum depot. Several local cyclists who have been injured due to their bicycle wheels slipping on the track have called for a solution. The City of Ballarat spent more than $15,000 in 2011 investigating solutions, with limited success. In November 2014 the council carried out extensive roadworks at the intersection. The tram tracks were left in place, but the road was realigned 12 metres (39 ft) west. This changes the angle at which bicycles cross the track and should make it safer. The roadwork was completed on 23 December 2014 and cost $420,000.

== See also ==
- Rail transport in Victoria
- Trams in Australia
