= N-class Sydney tram =

N-class
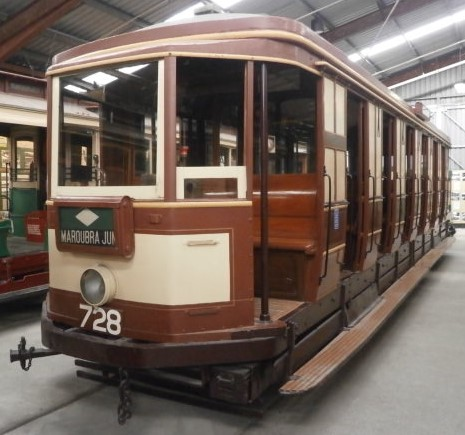
- Stored in Sydney Tramway Museum
- Manufacturer: Randwick Tramway Workshops; Ritchie Brothers; Meadowbank Manufacturing Company
- Constructed: 1901-06
- Number built: 97
- Fleet numbers: 295, 398-412, 613-647, 684-728
- Capacity: 60 (Seated)

Specifications
- Train length: 37 ft 4 in (11.38 m)
- Height: 12 ft 1.5 in (3.70 m)
- Maximum speed: 60 km/h
- Weight: 14.28 long tons (14.5 t)
- Power output: 2 x 60 hp
- Electric system(s): 600 V DC catenary
- Current collection: Trolley pole
- Wheels driven: 2 axles
- Track gauge: 1,435 mm (4 ft 8 1/2 in)

The N-class trams are a crossbench design of tram with a two-bogie design, each pair of benches had doors at each side.

They were attached to Dowling Street, Newtown, Rozelle, Tempe, Ultimo, Enfield and Rockdale depots. Nine were transferred to Newcastle as steam trailers in 1915, all later returned and had their electrical equipment reinstated. The last was withdrawn in 1949.

== Preservation ==
Three have been preserved:

- 710, 718, 728 at the Sydney Tramway Museum
