= C-class Sydney tram =

Australian tram type

C-class
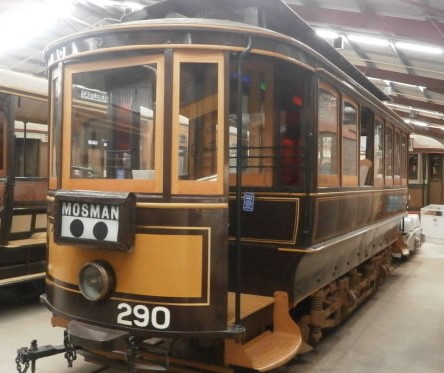
- Stored in Sydney Tramway Museum
- Manufacturer: Bignall & Morrison; Hudson Brothers; Clyde Engineering
- Constructed: 1896-1900
- Number built: 97
- Fleet numbers: 4-17, 20-97, 289-291
- Capacity: 20-26 (Seated)

Specifications
- Train length: 22 ft 0 in (6.71 m) to 26 ft 0 in (7.92 m)
- Width: 7 ft 3.5 in (2.22 m)
- Height: 12 ft 1.5 in (3.70 m)
- Maximum speed: 60 km/h
- Weight: 8.41 long tons (8.5 t)
- Power output: 4 x 36 hp (later 50)
- Electric system(s): 600 V DC catenary
- Current collection: Trolley pole
- Track gauge: 1,435 mm (4 ft 8 1/2 in)

The C-class trams are a class of single bogie end-loading electric trams operated on the Sydney tram network.

== History ==
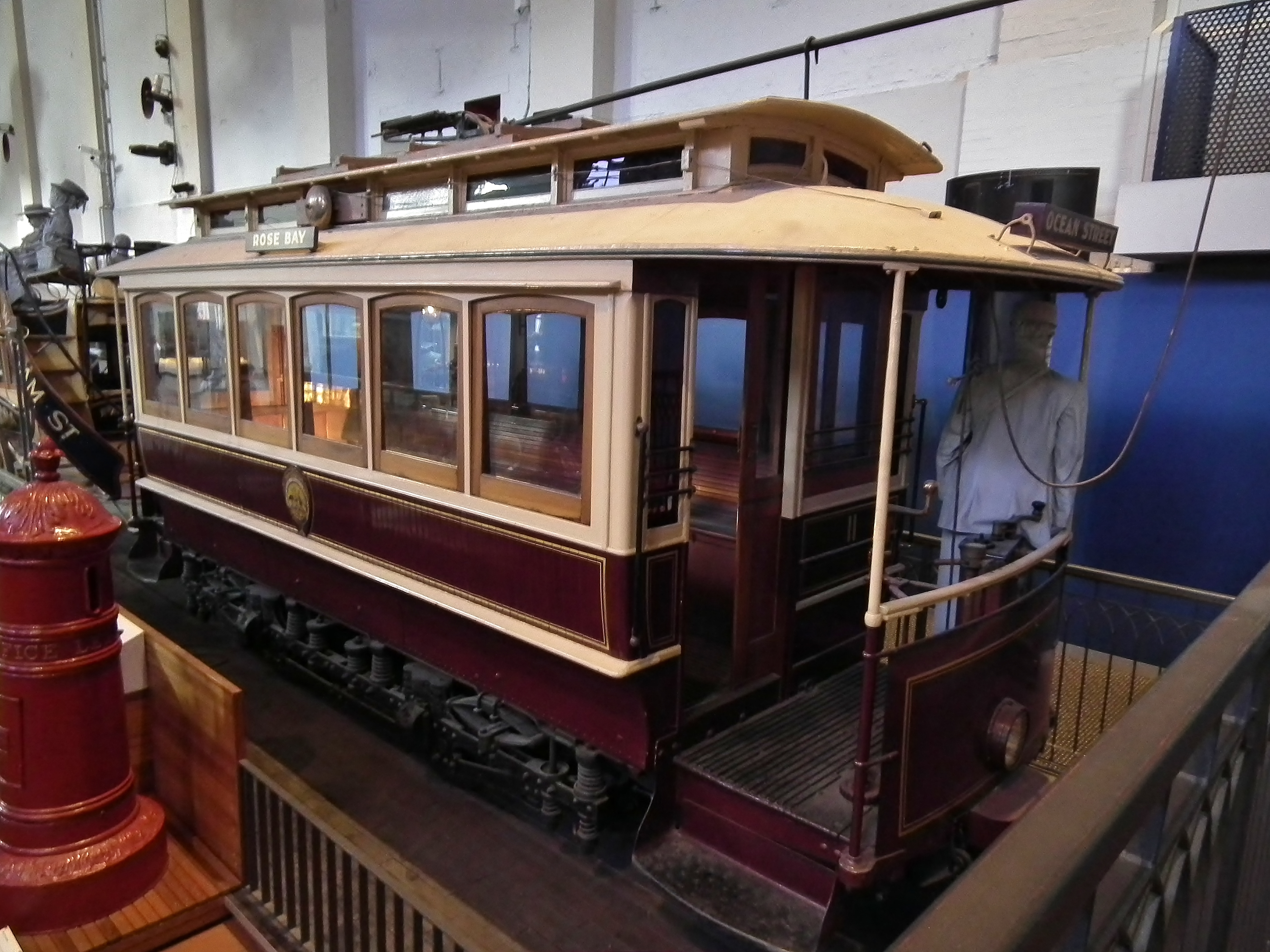
Preserved C11 at the Powerhouse Museum

Between 1896 and 1900, 97 C-class trams were built by three Sydney firms; Bignall & Morrison, Hudson Brothers and Clyde Engineering with bogies supplied by the Peckham Motor Truck & Wheel Co, Kingston, New York. There were four different body types, with variations in width, length, number of windows, and seating capacity (20-26). Three (289-291) were built as trailer cars, later being fitted with power equipment.

A typical C-class tram featured a single saloon passenger area comprised two longitudinal timber benches facing inwards, accommodating 22 seated passengers, with standing room in the centre aisle. The interior featured varnished timberwork, and there was a clerestory roof with sidelights of coloured glass. Sliding doors at each end led to outside platforms where the driver controlled the tram. The driver was protected by an overhanging canopy, where passengers entered and left the car.

C-class trams towed steam tram and cable tram trailers, and many ran coupled together. There were also examples of C and D classes being coupled. Some of these C/C and C/D combinations became permanent, with the inner end driving controls being removed. They mainly operated from Ridge Street Tram Depot, and to a lesser extent from Rushcutters Bay, Ultimo and Waverley.

In 1905, three (14-16) were sold to Ballarat. In 1907, four (23, 25, 38 and 39) were sold to the Victorian Railways as replacements for trams destroyed by a fire at Elwood depot. Mass withdrawals began in 1917 with all out of service by 1926. From 1924 until 1963, one tram (37) saw service on the jetty at Byron Bay as a locomotive-hauled car.

== Numbers ==
- Bignall & Morrison: (1896/97) 4-8, 289-291
- Hudson Brothers: (1898) 9-17, 29, 33, 59 (1899) 19, 22-28, 30-32, 34-51, 53-58, 60-66, 76, 77 (1900) 18, 20, 21, 52, 67-75
- Clyde Engineering: (1899) 78-91, 94-97 (1900) 92, 93

== Preservation ==
Seven have been preserved:

- 11 by the Powerhouse Museum restored in 1961 to original livery at Randwick Tramway Workshops
- 29 and 290 in operational condition at the Sydney Tramway Museum
- 12, 33 and 37 under restoration at the Sydney Tramway Museum. Sadly No.12 was destroyed by fire during a vandalism attack in 2016
- 95, at the Illawarra Light Railway Museum, Albion Park as a carriage
