= F-class Sydney tram =

L/P-class
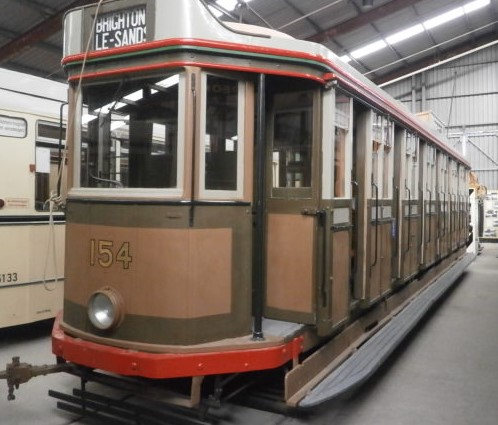
- on display at the Sydney Tramway Museum
- Manufacturer: Clyde Engineering
- Constructed: 1899-1902
- Number built: 251
- Fleet numbers: 122, 140-288, 294, 296-395

Specifications
- Train length: 38 ft 6.5 in (11.75 m)
- Width: 7 ft 3.5 in (2.22 m)
- Height: 12 ft 1.5 in (3.70 m)
- Maximum speed: 60 km/h
- Weight: 12.26 long tons (12.5 t)
- Power output: 4 x 60 hp
- Electric system(s): 600 V DC catenary
- Current collection: Trolley pole with grooved wheel
- Track gauge: 1,435 mm (4 ft 8 1/2 in)

The F-class trams are a class of two-bogie California combination car trams operated on the Sydney tram network with longitudinal seating in the open part of the car. They were later rebuilt as the L-class trams and some again as the L/P-class trams.

== History ==
In 1899, F122 was built by Clyde Engineering as a prototype. Deemed a success, a further 250 were built by Clyde Engineering between 1900 and 1902. They were introduced for the electrification of the Eastern Suburbs, South-Western and Western lines. Between 1906 and 1914, all were converted to L class trams at Randwick Tramway Workshops with the open seating altered to a cross-bench configuration, like the K and O class trams, rather than the original cable-tram style outward-facing longitudinal seating. F393 was not included, having been converted to a driver training car.

Between 1918 and 1930, all L class were rebuilt to resemble the P class trams as the L/P class. In 1920, 16 were allocated to the Rockdale Line while 98 were transferred to the Newcastle network between 1923 and 1926. Ten of those at Newcastle had air hoses installed at their number 1 end, enabling them to tow trailers, including two hearses, as explained in the Newcastle electric text. On the main system they operated out of Dowling Street, Newtown, Tempe and Waverley depots. The last was withdrawn in 1951.

== Preservation ==
Five have been preserved:

- 154 (first electric tram preserved in Australia), 257, 298, 341 (in L/P Configuration) & 393 (in original condition) at the Sydney Tramway Museum
- 284 at the Newcastle Museum
