= R-class Sydney tram =

R-class
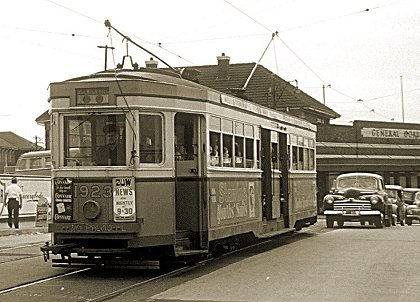
- R1923 at Sydenham station
- Manufacturer: Clyde Engineering
- Constructed: 1933–35
- Number built: 195
- Fleet numbers: 1738–1932
- Capacity: 48 (Seated); 80 (Standing)

Specifications
- Train length: 14.33 metres
- Width: 2.74 metres
- Height: 3.18 metres
- Maximum speed: 60 km/h
- Weight: 17.9 t
- Power output: 4 x 40 hp
- Electric system: 600 V DC overhead trolley wire
- Current collection: Trolley pole
- Track gauge: 1,435 mm (4 ft 8 1/2 in)

The R-class trams were a class of drop-centre saloon car type trams operated on the Sydney tram network.

== History ==
Class leader 1738 was unveiled in a ceremony at Randwick Tramway Workshops on 29 September 1933. All 195 cars were in service by mid-1935. Passengers were accommodated in two saloons featuring 16 tip-over upholstered seats in each, plus wooden seating for 16 in the centre section. The relatively low seating capacity of only 48 (compared to the older toastrack trams) and their inability to operate in service as multiple units went against the class. The last five of the order for 200 tramcars were altered during construction to a modified design with increased seating capacity, becoming prototypes for the R1 class, resulting in only 195 being completed to the original (R class) design.

Rushcutters Bay was the first depot to be allocated trams, Fort Macquarie followed next, then Waverley, North Sydney and Newtown. Ultimo received its first R cars in 1940, with Rozelle and Tempe gaining them in 1949. Dowling Street finally received R cars when Fort Macquarie Depot closed in 1955.

Two North Sydney R cars plunged into Sydney Harbour when running out of control on the steep descent to Athol Wharf, both were repaired. Withdrawals commenced in mid-1958 when the North Sydney system closed and these cars went into storage, mainly at Waverley. The last of the R class trams were withdrawn on 22 November 1958, the last day of operation of Rozelle Depot and the last day of services in George Street and the Western suburbs.

== Preservation ==
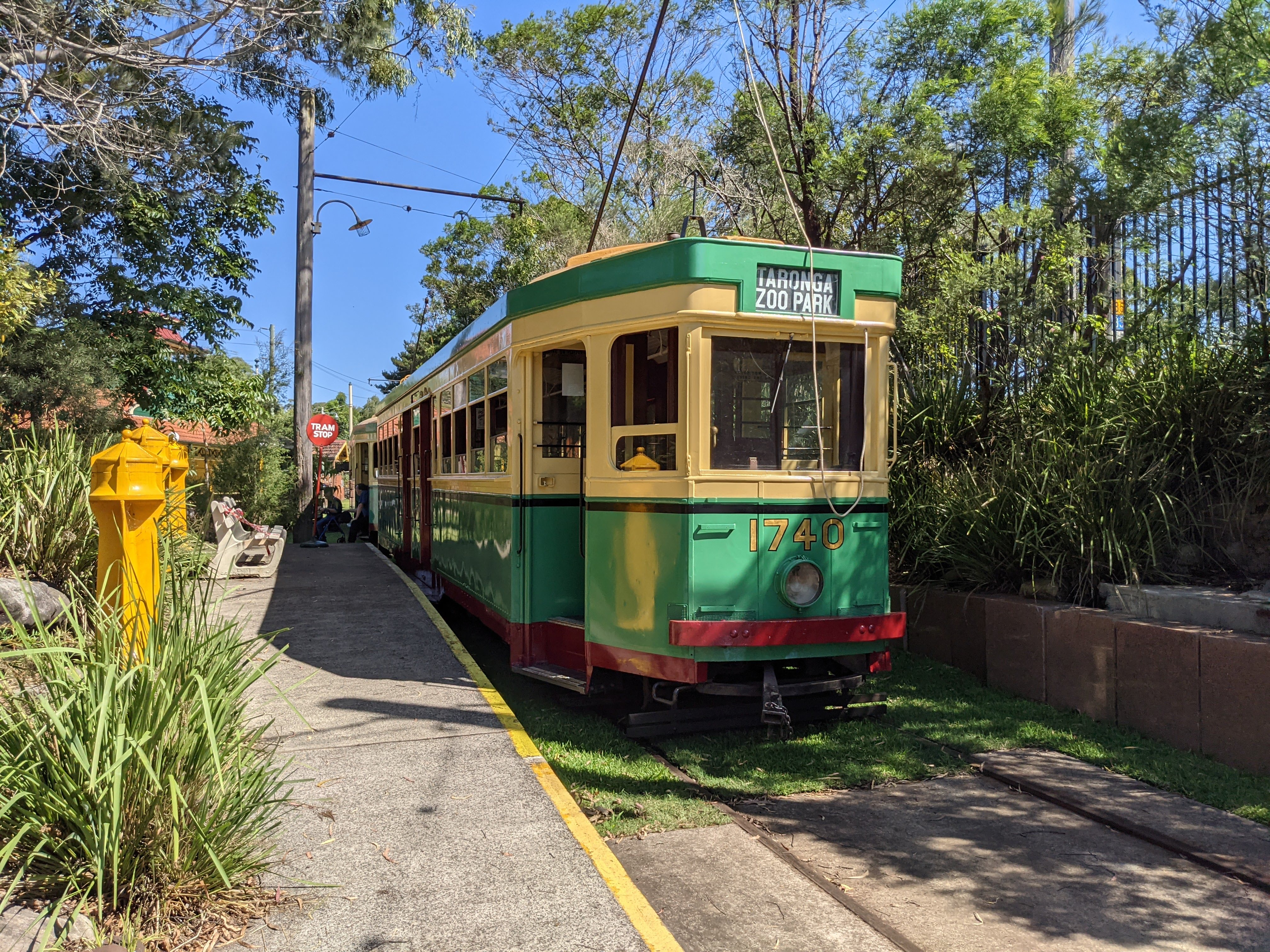
No. 1740 preserved in operating condition at the Sydney Tramway Museum

Eleven have been preserved:

- 1738 at the Powerhouse Museum
- 1740 in operational condition at the Sydney Tramway Museum
- 1741, 1798, 1819 (since lost in a fire), 1917 and 1923 in storage at the Sydney Tramway Museum
- 1753 has been restored and is incorporated as a static display in Warringah Council's Tramshed Arts & Community Centre, Narrabeen
- 1808 on loan from the Sydney Tramway Museum to Welcome Board Limited's Christchurch Tramway from 2017, where it runs with the number of 1888 for marketing reasons. Previously at the Museum of Transport and Technology, Auckland, New Zealand 2009–2017, operated in Melbourne in 2003
- 1845 Stored at the Newport Railway Workshops, owned by VicTrack, allocated to Sydney Tramway Museum.
- 1849 previously a shop at Big Bear Shopping Centre, Neutral Bay now restored and privately owned
- 1892 converted to a Harry's Cafe de Wheels, Newcastle
