= P-class tram =

P-class tram may refer to:

- P-class Melbourne tram, built 1917–1918
- P-class Sydney tram, built 1921–1929
- O/P-class Sydney tram, converted from O-class 1918–1946
