= R-class tram =

R-class tram may refer to:

- R-class Melbourne tram, built 1920
- R-class Sydney tram, built 1933–1935
- R1-class Sydney tram, built 1935, 1950–1953
