= P-class Sydney tram =

Class of trams

P-class
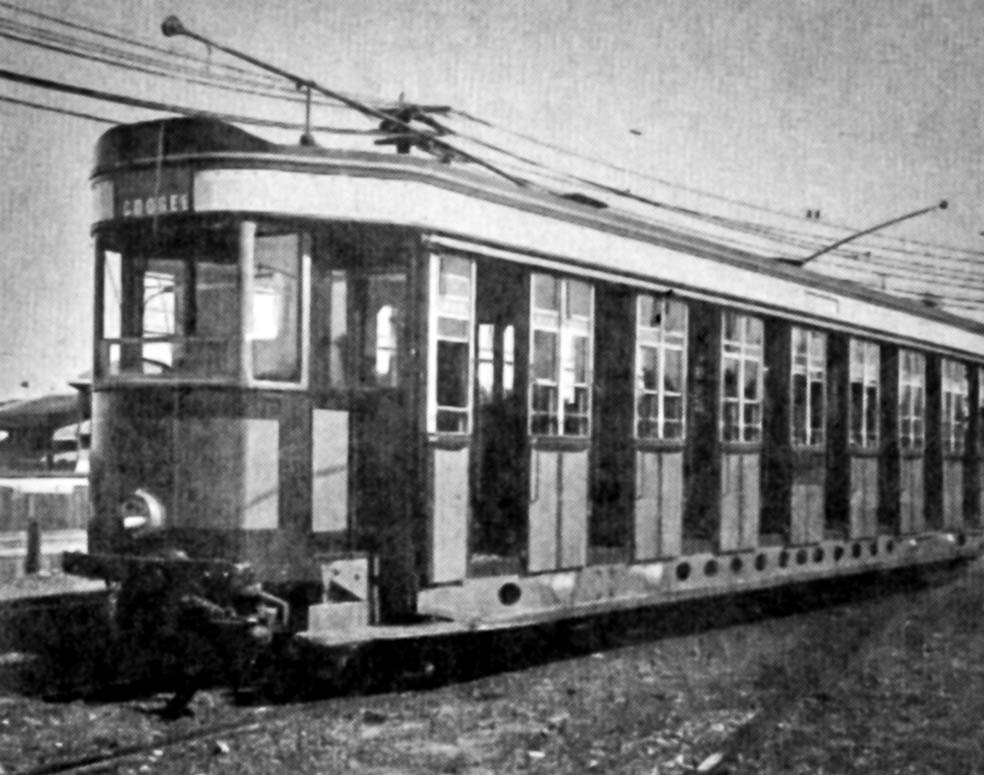
- P1480 at Randwick Racecourse
- Manufacturer: Randwick Tramway Workshops; Meadowbank Manufacturing Company; Walsh Island Dockyard
- Constructed: 1921-29
- Number built: 258
- Fleet numbers: 1480-1737
- Capacity: 80 (Seated); 48 (Standing)

Specifications
- Train length: 13.85 metres
- Width: 2.74 metres
- Height: 3.26 metres
- Maximum speed: 60 km/h
- Weight: 16.9 t
- Power output: 4 x 40 hp
- Electric system(s): 600 V DC catenary
- Current collector(s): Trolley pole
- Track gauge: 1,435 mm (4 ft 8 1/2 in)

The P-class trams were a class of trams operated on the Sydney tram network.

== History ==
Between 1921 and 1929, 258 P class trams were built by Randwick Tramway Workshops, Meadowbank Manufacturing Company, and the Walsh Island Dockyard. As with the preceding O class trams, the P class were cross bench cars with 80 seat capacity. They were a big improvement over the O-class in that all compartments offered protection from bad weather on both sides of the bodies when running. Fitted with folding canvas doors in each compartment, conductors only had to push open one half of a door.

The P-class trams were based at all depots on the main system except Rushcutters Bay, but worked to the Sydney Stadium, just past the depot between 1947 and 1959 out of Waverley and Dowling Street for special events, plus out to Watsons Bay for picnic specials. Most were withdrawn in 1959/1960.

One tram, 1691, had a narrow corridor cut through the cross bench bulkheads, and was then the sole member of the PR class.

Four (1517 & 1573 at Randwick Tramway Workshops and 1562 & 1582 Eveleigh Railway Workshops) were refitted with the same windows, centre door and internal layout as the R1 class, and were known as the PR1 class or P/R1 class.

== Preservation ==
Six have been preserved:

- 1497, 1517 and 1573 at the Sydney Tramway Museum
- 1729 (first tram to North Bondi) under restoration at the Sydney Tramway Museum
- 1501 previously sleeping quarters at a ‘Tram-O-Tel’ in Lightning Ridge
  now under restoration for Sydney Tramway Museum at Bendigo Tramways
- 1700 at the Seashore Trolley Museum, Maine
