= Sydney Tramway Museum =

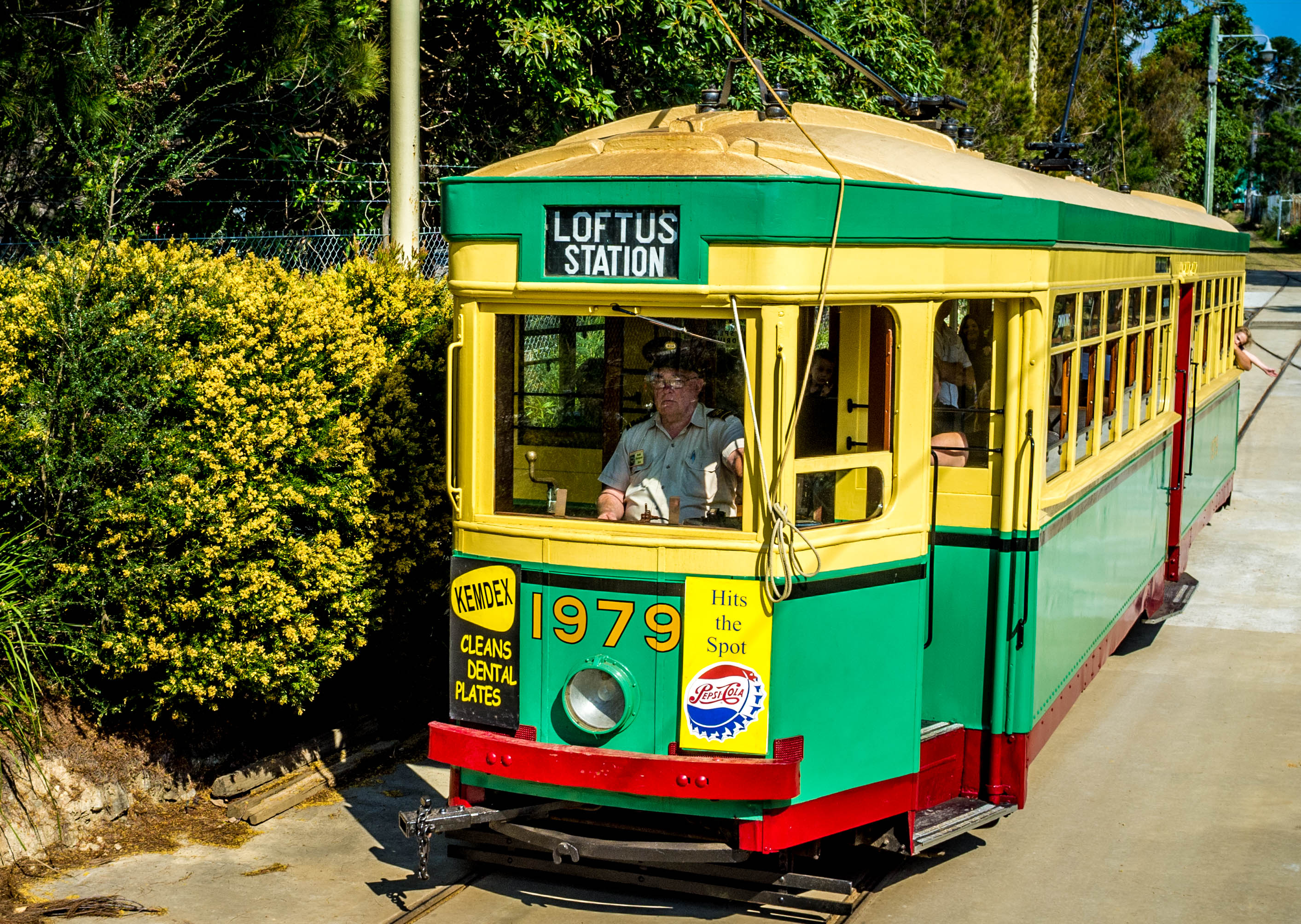
- Established: 1965
- Location: Pitt Street, Loftus, New South Wales, Australia
- Coordinates: 34.044321°S 151.051966°E
- Type: Tramway museum
- Parking: On site
- Website: www.sydneytramwaymuseum.com.au

The Sydney Tramway Museum, operated by the South Pacific Electric Railway Co-operative Society, is Australia's oldest tramway museum and the largest in the southern hemisphere. It is located at Loftus in the southern suburbs of Sydney.

== History ==
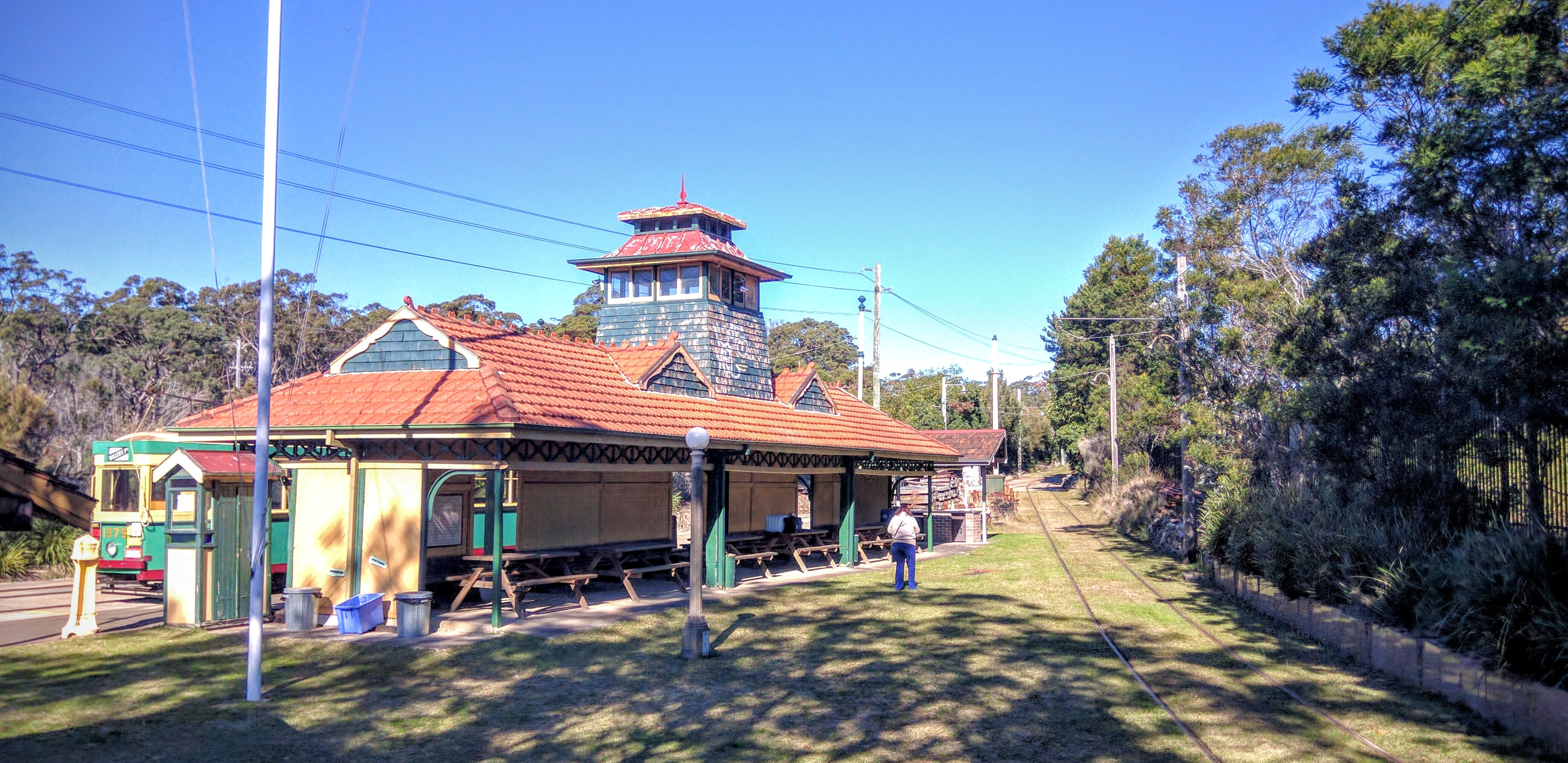
Former Railway Square tram stop re-erected at the Sydney Tramway Museum in July 2016

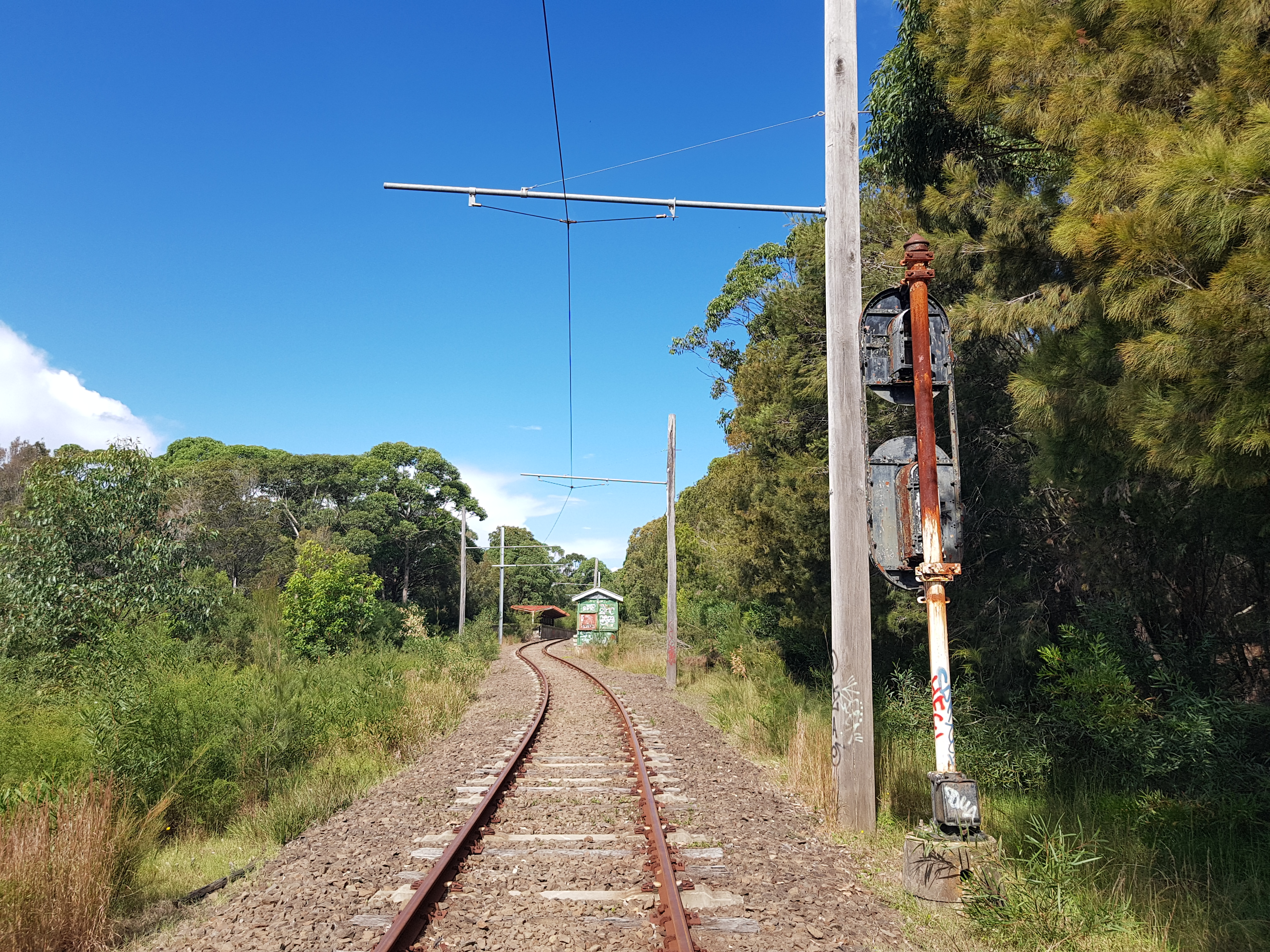
Royal National Park line in April 2020

Construction of the museum at its original site on the edge of the Royal National Park commenced in August 1956. It was officially opened in March 1965 by NSW Deputy Premier Pat Hills. The facilities were basic, initially a four-track shed built with second hand materials and approximately 800 m (2,600 ft) of running track.

In 1975, the Government of New South Wales approved the museum moving to a new site across the Princes Highway adjacent to Loftus railway station. Construction commenced in April 1980, with the first trams transferred from the old site in November 1982. It officially opened on 19 March 1988. The former Railway Square tramway shelter that had been disassembled in 1973 was reassembled. The last tram left the Royal National Park in May 1989.

In 1989, a traverser from Comeng's Granville factory was purchased. Following CityRail closing the two kilometre Royal National Park line in 1991, the museum was able to commence operating services on the line on 1 May 1993.

In 2001, the museum was the recipient of the YMCA facade, that was previously located at the corner of Pitt and Bathurst Street in the Sydney central business district. The facade was relocated by Meriton to make way for a new building being constructed at the same location. This huge impressive sandstone structure dating from the 1880s makes a spectacular backdrop when entering the museum complex from the front gates. The building is not finished yet, and is still being worked on as funding permits. The gates from the original Gladesville Bridge were installed as the depot gates in 2010.

On 23 October 2015, the museum storage shed was broken into by vandals and caught fire. Located off the main museum site, at the museum's original location in the Royal National Park near Loftus Oval, the shed housed the museum's reserve collection of six trams, four buses and a double-decker bus chassis dating to 1937. The shed and contents were destroyed in the blaze.

== Operations ==
The museum has an extensive collection of trams from Sydney and other cities in Australia, as well as from other places around the world. The museum operates 4 kilometres (2.5 mi) of track. One line runs 1.5 kilometres (0.93 mi) north towards Sutherland, paralleling Rawson Avenue in the way that parts of Sydney's tram system operated. The second runs 2.5 kilometres (1.6 mi) to the south and utilises the Royal National Park branch railway line that was constructed in 1886 and closed by CityRail in June 1991.

In 1993, the museum converted the line to tramway standards and connected it to the then existing Sutherland line to establish what is now a popular means of access to the world's second oldest national park. The line terminates at Royal National Park railway station.

The museum opens and operates trams on Wednesdays, Sundays, public holidays (except Christmas Day) and on selected weekdays during school holidays.

The Sydney Tramway Museum is run entirely by volunteers and self funds its day-to-day activities, restorations, maintenance and construction programs from gate takings and donations from the generous public.

== Preservation ==
Rolling Stock
No	Description	Manufacturer	Type	Year Built	Length m	Weight t	Date Acquired	Status	Comments
12	C-Class Tram	Hudson Bros	Single truck	1899	7.62	8.60	1997	Scrapped	Converted to breakdown car 56s in 1909. Converted back to passenger in 1959 By NSWDOT. Originally donated to NSW Tramway Historical Society. Body in poor condition. Stored at the old RNP depot site. Burnt and scrapped after the fire.
29	C-Class Tram	Hudson Bros	Single truck	1898	7.62	8.60	1961	IO	Converted to breakdown car 60s in 1910. Converted back to passenger in 1995 at STM. Operational in 2001.
33	C-Class Tram	Hudson Bros	Single truck	1898	7.62	8.60	1995	URF	Converted to experimental double deck car in 1907 and lasted until 1908. Converted to breakdown car 33s in 1924 at Randwick Workshop. Body only recovered in 1995 from Newcastle Tramway Museum, Rutherford. Being restored in Bendigo to double deck tram.
37	C-Class Tram	Hudson Bros	Single truck	1899	7.62	8.60	2010	URN	Sold in 1924. Donated by the Canberra Tradesmen's Union Club in 2010. Moved to Sydney 20 April 2010 for restoration and to be sent to Christchurch, NZ on completion.
290	C-Class Tram	Morrison	Single truck	1896	7.93	8.60	1957	IOS	Converted to breakdown car 115s in 1927 by NSWDOT. Restored to Passenger tram by SPER.
23	Cable trailer	Ritchie Brothers	Single truck	1894	5.64	2.50	1976	DCO	Under restoration
117	D-Class Tram	Clyde	Single truck	1899	9.40	9.66	1994	URN	Converted to breakdown car 112s in 1913 by NSWDOT. Major restoration back to passenger car
529	E-Class Tram	Clyde	Single truck	1903	8.37	10.20	1957	URN	Under restoration
530	E-Class Tram	Clyde	Single truck	1903	8.37	10.20	1957	URN	Under restoration
393	F-Class Tram	Clyde	Bogie	1902	11.75	13.00	1957	IOS	Converted to Eye Sight car 127s in 1927. Restored to original condition at STM.
24s	Freight car	NSWGT	Bogie	1903	9.60	12.70	1957	IOS	Car preserved without motors. Body restored for display.
675	J-Class Tram	Meadowbank	Single truck	1904	8.89	11.70	1996	IO	Restored to operating condition. In service 2009. Out of service after accident with Nagasaki 1054
1295	K-Class Tram	Meadowbank	Single truck	1913	8.89	10.90	1997	Scrapped	Originally donated to NSW Tramway Historical Society. Body in poor condition. Stored at old RNP site depot. Burnt in a fire in 2015. Scrapped
1296	K-Class Tram	Meadowbank	Single truck	1913	8.89	10.90	1957	DCO
154	L/P-Class Tram	Clyde	Bogie	1900	12.45	15.20	1957	IO	Built as an F-Class Tram and converted to L class in 1910. Converted to L/P in 1926
257	L/P-Class Tram	Clyde	Bogie	1901	12.45	15.20	1995	SFI	Body stored at HPOTS, Cessnock poor condition.
298	L/P-Class Tram	Clyde	Bogie	1901	12.45	15.20	1995	SFI	Body stored at HPOTS, Cessnock poor condition
341	L/P-Class Tram	Clyde	Bogie	1901	12.45	15.20	1995	SFI	Body stored at HPOTS, Cessnock poor condition
710	N-Class Tram	Meadowbank	Bogie	1906	11.99	15.10	2007	Scrapped	Stored at Old site, RNP* poor condition of body. Burnt in fire in 2015. Scrapped
718	N-Class Tram	Meadowbank	Bogie	1906	11.99	15.10	1995	SFI	Stored at HPOTS, Cessnock poor condition of body
728	N-Class Tram	Meadowbank	Bogie	1906	11.99	15.10	1957	IOS
824	O-Class Tram	Meadowbank	Bogie	1909	13.58	17.80	1995	SFI	Stored at HPOTS, Cessnock poor condition of body
957	O-Class Tram	Meadowbank	Bogie	1910	13.58	17.80	1978	URN	Under restoration
1111	O-Class Tram	Meadowbank	Bogie	1912	13.58	17.80	1959	IO	Oldest tram in regular operation
1089	O/P-Class Tram	Meadowbank	Bogie	1912	13.58	17.90	1974	URN	Originally an O-Class Tram; rebuilt by NSWDOT to O/P on 15 June 1920. Under restoration
99u	Overhead Line car	Meadowbank	Bogie	1913	12.65	18.90	1959	IOW	Operational
1497	P-Class Tram	NSWGT	Bogie	1922	13.85	16.90	1961	IO
1501	P-Class Tram	NSWGT	Bogie	1922	13.85	16.90	1999	SFI	Stored at Bendigo pending review for restoration
1729	P-Class Tram	Morts Dock	Bogie	1929	13.85	16.90	2010	URN	Donated by the Tradesmens Union Club, Canberra in 2010. Moved to Sydney 24 January 2010. Under restoration. New P type bogies fitted 10/11/18. Currently awaiting further restoration due to workshop queue
1573	P/R1-Class Tram	Meadowbank	Bogie	1923	13.85	18.60	1965	SNO	P car rebuilt as PR1 in 1949 by NSWDOT. To be restored
948	Prison Tram	NSWGT	Bogie	1909	12.04	15.60	1957	DCO	Car preserved without motors.
1740	R-Class Tram	Clyde	Bogie	1933	14.35	18.00	1961	IO
1741	R-Class Tram	Clyde	Bogie	1933	14.35	18.00	2003	SNO	Burnt in fire in 2015
1753	R-Class Tram	Clyde	Bogie	1933	14.35	17.90	1999	SFI	Body stored at Rozelle Depot-ex Citytram Assoc.
1798	R-Class Tram	Clyde	Bogie	1934	14.35	18.00	1999	SNO	Body stored at HPOTS, Cessnock poor condition.
1808	R-Class Tram	Clyde	Bogie	1934	14.35	18.00	1999	OOS	Restored at Bendigo in 2000 to operational condition. Stored at Melbourne in Preston Workshops. Leased to MOTAT in New Zealand December 2009 and used in Auckland until June 2017. Transported to Christchurch for Welcome Aboard Limited's Christchurch City Tramway August 2017.
1819	R-Class Tram	Clyde	Bogie	1934	14.35	18.00	2006	Scrapped	Moved From Canberra Tradesmens Union Club. Stored at old RNP site*. Burnt in fire in 2015. Scrapped
1917	R-Class Tram		Bogie	1935	14.35	18.00	2003	Scrapped	Burnt in fire in 2015. Scrapped
1923	R-Class Tram		Bogie	1935	14.35	17.90	1997	SFI	Body stored at Rozelle Depot-ex Citytram Assoc.
1933	R/R1 class tram	Clyde	Bogie	1935	14.35	17.90	1990	SNO	Car preserved without motors. Currently used as Book Shop
1943	R1-Class Tram	Clyde	Bogie	1935	14.35	17.90	1997	SFI	Body stored at Rozelle Depot-ex Citytram Assoc. Future to be decided-July 2012.
1951	R1-Class Tram	Clyde	Bogie	1935	14.35	17.90	1994	SFI	Stored at Newstead, Victoria Partly restored
1971	R1-Class Tram	Clyde	Bogie	1936	14.35	17.90	1979	OOS	On loan, operating at Tramway Museum, St Kilda in South Australia in 2005
1979	R1-Class Tram	Clyde	Bogie	1936	14.35	17.90	1974	IO
1980	R1-Class Tram	Clyde	Bogie	1936	14.35	17.90	1999	SFI	Body stored at HPOTS, Cessnock poor condition.
1995	R1-Class Tram	Comeng	Bogie	1951	14.35	17.90	1997	SFI	Cosmetically restored for display in the redeveloped Rozelle Tram Depot
2001	R1-Class Tram	Comeng	Bogie	1951	14.35	17.90	2001	IO	Acquired by STM as a body in 2001. Restored at Bendigo in 2001 for the proposed Federation Tramways. Overhaul Complete December 2019, In Temporary Service. Will be Withdrawn for repainting to green and cream livery in January 2020. Repainting complete October 2020.
2044	R1-Class Tram	Comeng	Bogie	1952	14.35	17.90	1983	SNO	Car preserved without motors. Currently used as Traffic Office
2050	R1-Class Tram	Comeng	Bogie	1952	14.35	17.90	2011	SFI	Tram stored at Rozelle Depot- originally owned by Sydney City Council now ownership passed to STM-
2107	Variotram	Adtranz, Dandenong	5 Module Low floor	1997	29.5	36.5	2018	DCO	Ex Sydney Light Rail, acquired by Transport Heritage NSW and placed on permanent loan with STM in October 2018, operational awaiting certification
3	Reciprocating Rail Grinder	S&E Co, Bath	Single truck	1920	4.27	6.10	1971	OOS	Operable, converted to current design by MMTB in 1958. Loaned to MOTAT despatched from STM May 2011, overhauled and shipped back to Sydney, September 2017
11W	Scrubber	Meadowbank	Single truck	1908	8.89	10.90	2003	SFO	Originally K-Class Tram 797, converted to scrubber in 1953 by NSWDOT and coded 139s. Sold to MMTB in 1961. Stored in Melbourne at Preston Workshops until 2015, returned to service in 2019
134s	Scrubber tram	Ritchie Brothers	Single truck	1899	9.40	12.50	1961	IOW	Originally D class tram 102, converted to scrubber in 1930 and coded 134s, operational.
147s	Track Tamper		Single truck					IOW	Originally TDX45 on NSWGR register. Currently at Lithgow for conversion and to make operational.
19	Trolleybus	Ritchie Brothers	AEC 664T	1937	9.30	8.80	1978	URN	Under restoration
1275	Bus	Waddingtons	Leyland Tiger	1937					Operational
2619	Bus	Clyde	AEC Regent III	1952					Operational
144s	Weed Burner	NSWGT	Single truck	1956	3.00	3.60	1961	IOS
93u	Ballast Motor	Meadowbank	Bogie	1913	12.65	18.90	1967	URN	Restored for display only in 1991.
42s	Ballast Motor-U2	NSWGT	Bogie	1907	11.43	15.70	1981	IOW	Numbered L707 in NSWGR service from 1926 to 1980.
	Balmain Counterweight	Clyde	Single truck	1903	3.28	2.00	1955	IOS	Restored at Hunter Valley Training Company in 1990. On display in Display Hall
141s	Breakdown car	Meadowbank	Bogie	1911	13.85	18.03	1964	IOW	Originally O-Class Tram 1030, converted to breakdown car in 1955 by NSWDOT and coded 141s.
111	Z2-Class Tram	Comeng	Bogie	1979	16.52	19.20	2003	IO	111 mostly operates during Autumn, Winter and Spring
249	W2-Class Tram	Moore	Bogie	1924	14.63	16.52	1996	URN	In Federal Capital Commission Tramways Livery. Repainting in progress
611	Y1-Class Tram	MMTB	Bogie	1930	13.72	20.09	2014	IO
180	Brisbane Dreadnought Tram	Gardiner	Bogie	1924	11.58	12.20	1964	IO
295	Brisbane Dropcentre Tram	Brisbane City Council	Bogie	1930	13.87	15.30	1968	IO
548	Brisbane FM Class	Brisbane City Council	Bogie	1963	14.94	16.10	1969	IO
1692	Peter Witt streetcar	Breda	Bogie	1929	13.89	15.00	2001	URN	Will enter service once modifications are made to overhead and air compressor issues are resolved. Former Milan ATM Class 1500 tram. Based at Brunswick tram depot before transfer to Sydney
1014	PCC Tram	St Louis Car Company	Bogie	1948	15.37	18.20	1987	URN	Donated as bicentenary gift in 1988. Awaiting parts. Former San Francisco Municipal Railway tram
1054	Nagasaki Electric Tramway Class 1050	Nigata Iron Works	Bogie	1952	11.40	14.30	1992	IO	In Sendai, Japan the number was 121. Regauged and sent to Nagasaki Tramway system. Donated as bicentenary gift. Involved in accident with J675 May 2016. Repairs completed and re-entered service in early 2018
2656	Trams in Munich	Waggonfabri Joseph Rathgeber	Bogie	1965			1999		Donated 1999
2666	Trams in Munich	Waggonfabri Joseph Rathgeber	Bogie	1965			1999		Donated 1999

== Publications ==
The Sydney Tramway Museum publishes Trolley Wire on behalf of most tramway museums around the country. Published quarterly, it carries articles on tramways around the world and news from the various Australasian heritage tramways.

== Engineering heritage award ==
The museum received a Historic Engineering Marker from Engineers Australia as part of its Engineering Heritage Recognition Program.

== In popular culture ==
The 2018 film Ladies in Black had both live action scenes and film stock for CGI segments filmed around the Railway Square Waiting Shed that is located in the southern end of the museum site.

== See also ==
- List of rail transport–related periodicals
- Trams in Sydney
