= E-class Sydney tram =

E-class
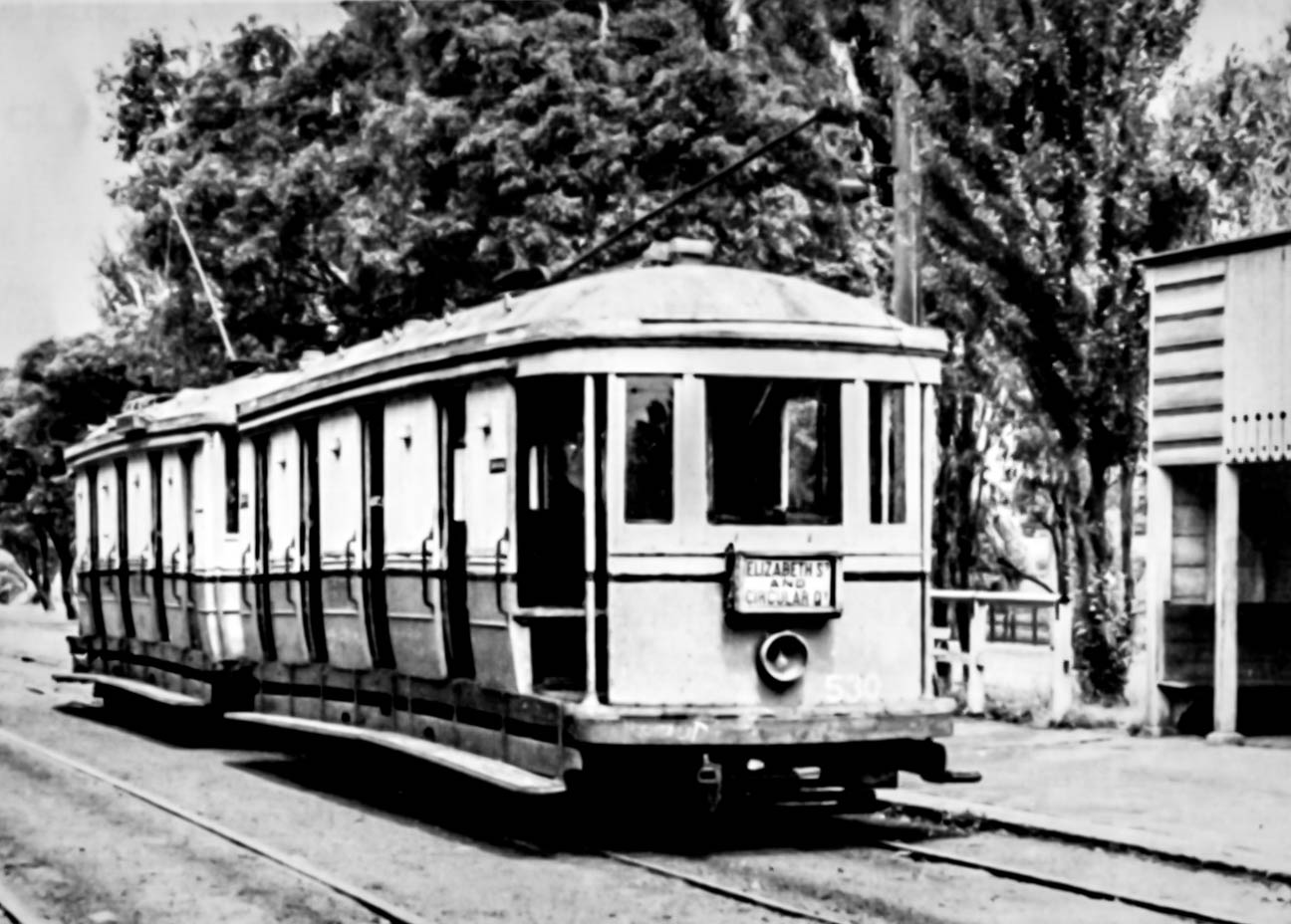
- E530 & E529 at Centennial Park
- Manufacturer: Randwick Tramway Workshops; Clyde Engineering; Meadowbank Manufacturing Company
- Constructed: 1901-1903
- Number built: 202
- Fleet numbers: 396, 397, 413-612

Specifications
- Train length: 27 ft 5.5 in (8.37 m)
- Width: 7 ft 3.5 in (2.22 m)
- Height: 12 ft 1.5 in (3.70 m)
- Maximum speed: 60 km/h
- Weight: 10.02 long tons (10.2 t)
- Power output: 4 x 48 hp (later 60)
- Electric system(s): 600 V DC overhead (trolley) wire
- Current collection: Trolley pole
- Track gauge: 1,435 mm (4 ft 8 1/2 in)

The E-class trams are a class of single bogie (four-wheel) single-ended cross-bench design trams operated on the Sydney tram network. They always operated in permanently-coupled pairs because they were fitted-out electrically as if the pair was a single bogie car.

== History ==
In 1901, two prototypes were built by the Randwick Tramway Workshops. Deemed a success, a further 200 were built by Clyde Engineering and Meadowbank Manufacturing Company in 1902/03. They were introduced for the electrification of the Eastern Suburbs lines, but also operated services on the North Shore lines.

Withdrawals commenced in 1934; two pairs (499+500 and 529+530) were fitted with track brakes for the Neutral Bay service, with 529+530 lasting in service until 1955.

== Numbers ==
- Randwick Tramway Workshops: (1901) 396, 397
- Clyde Engineering: (1902/03) 413-560, 611, 612
- Meadowbank Manufacturing Company: (1902/1903) 561-610

== Preservation ==
Two have been preserved:

- 529 & 530 at the Sydney Tramway Museum
