= N-class tram =

N-class tram may refer to:

- N-class Melbourne tram, built 1916
- N-class Sydney tram, built 1901-1906
