= Royal National Park railway station =

Railway station in New South Wales, Australia

Royal National Park
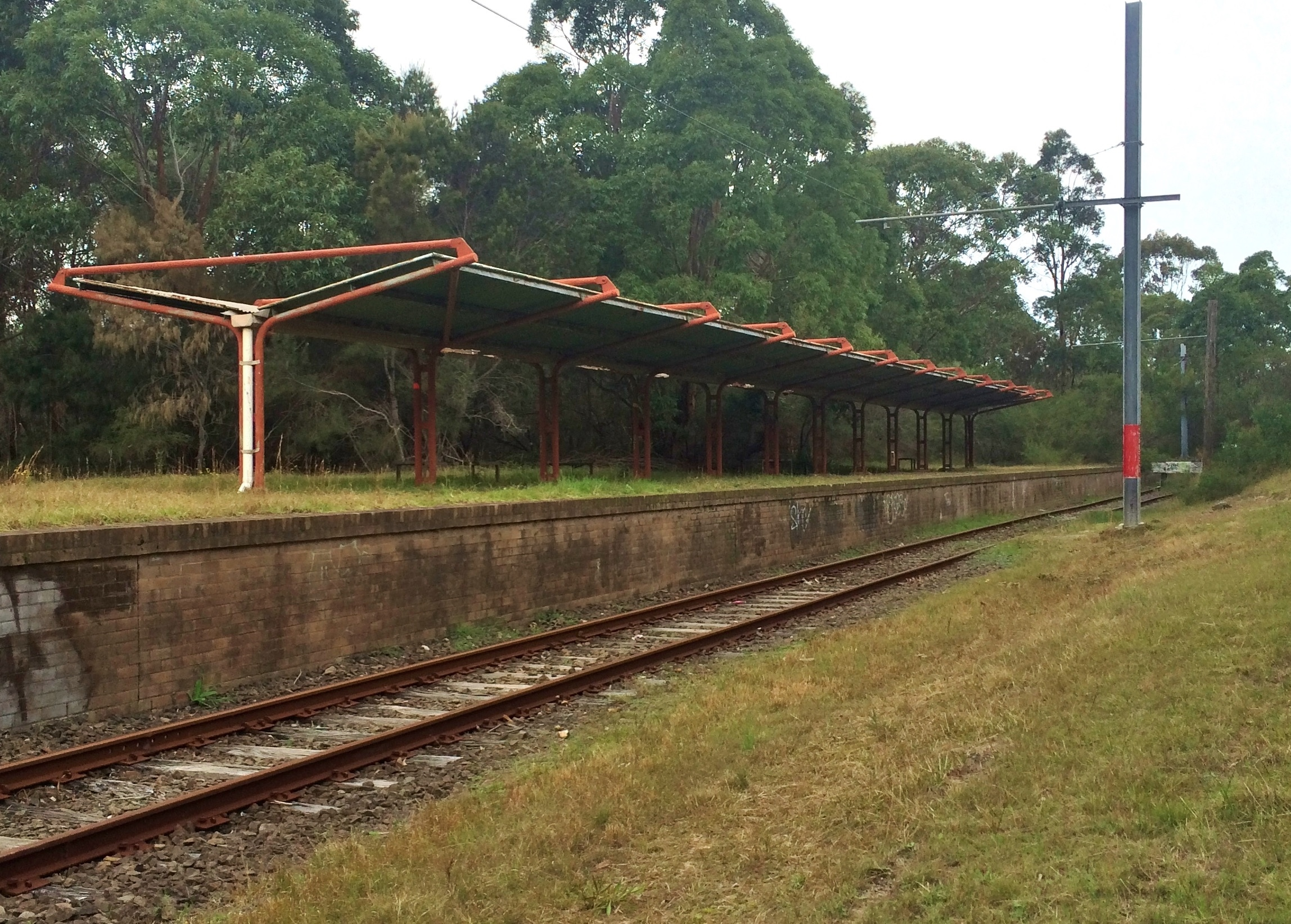
- View of the Royal National Park railway station in May 2015

General information
- Location: Farnell Avenue, Audley, New South Wales
- Coordinates: 34°03′45″S 151°03′24″E
- Operator: Sydney Tramway Museum
- Distance: 28.420 kilometres (17.659 mi) from Central
- Platforms: 1
- Tracks: 1

Construction
- Structure type: Ground
- Accessible: unsure

History
- Opened: 9 March 1886 (Commuter rail); 1 May 1993 (Light rail)
- Closed: 11 June 1991
- Rebuilt: 1978
Location

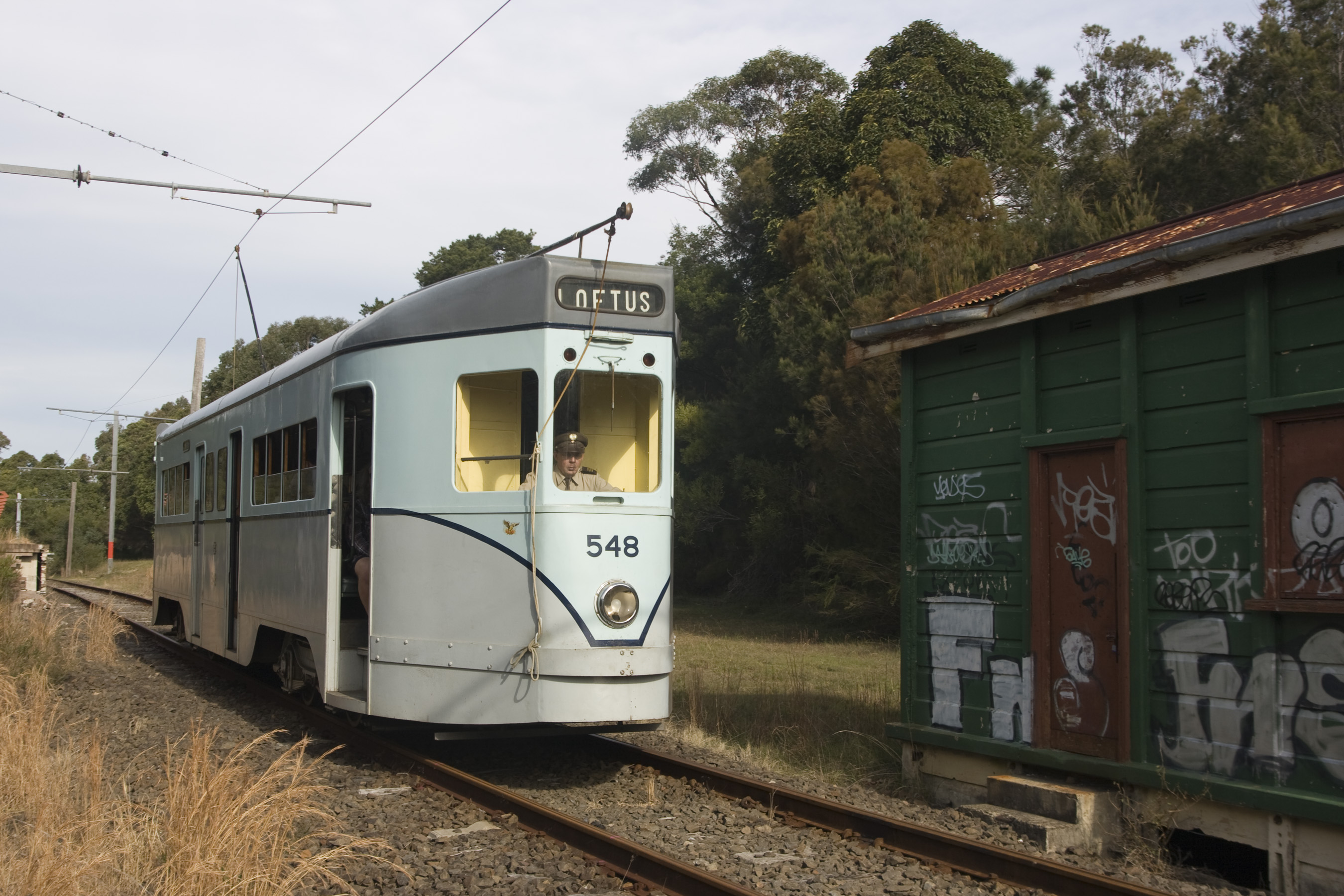
Phoenix carriage 548 departing Royal National Park station

Royal National Park railway station is located in Audley, New South Wales and services travellers to the Royal National Park. It is the terminus of the Royal National Park railway line, formerly part of the Sydney commuter rail network and now operated by the Sydney Tramway Museum. The station opened in 1886 and was served by trains on the Sydney network until 1991 when the Royal National Park railway line was closed due to low patronage. The line and station were transferred to the Sydney Tramway Museum and re-opened in May 1993 for heritage tramway operations.

The museum operates services on the line on Wednesdays and Sundays, with the first service running at 10:15 am. Departures are hourly from then on, with the last one at 2:30 pm on Wednesday and 4:30 pm on Sunday. It is a popular means of access to the Royal National Park.

== History ==
The station opened as Loftus on 9 March 1886 (the station currently known as Loftus was then called Loftus Junction). It was renamed National Park on 1 May 1889, back to Loftus in January 1890 and back again to National Park on 1 December 1896. It was finally renamed Royal National Park on 16 July 1955. The original island platform could accommodate ten carriages. There was also a goods bank and five sidings. Royal National Park was included in the electrification of the Illawarra railway line in 1926 and remained the southern limit of electrification until 1980 when overhead wiring was extended to Waterfall.

At its peak in the 1930s, the line was served by 25 trains a day on weekends. On 4 July 1967, three of the five sidings at the station were removed. In 1978, the original station was demolished to make way for a visitor's centre and a new single platform built. By 1988, the line was being served by only three trains a day.

After the Cowan rail accident in 1990, the Royal National Park branch line was used for safety tests. Because of the small number of services running on the line, it had the capacity for driver training to be conducted when required.

Following the discovery of signalling faults, services ceased on 11 June 1991. With major expenditure required and average patronage having dwindled to three passengers per train, the line was formally closed. The line was taken over by the Sydney Tramway Museum with Royal National Park station re-opening as the line's terminus in May 1993. Due to the design of the heritage trams running on the line, they are unable to use the actual station platform.

== Services ==
Platform	Line	Stopping pattern	Notes
1	ParkLink	Shuttle to Railway Square (Loftus)	Select days only
