= Rozelle Tram Depot =

Historic part of Sydney's tram network

Coordinates: 33°52′35″S 151°10′41″E

- Main Sydney Tram System
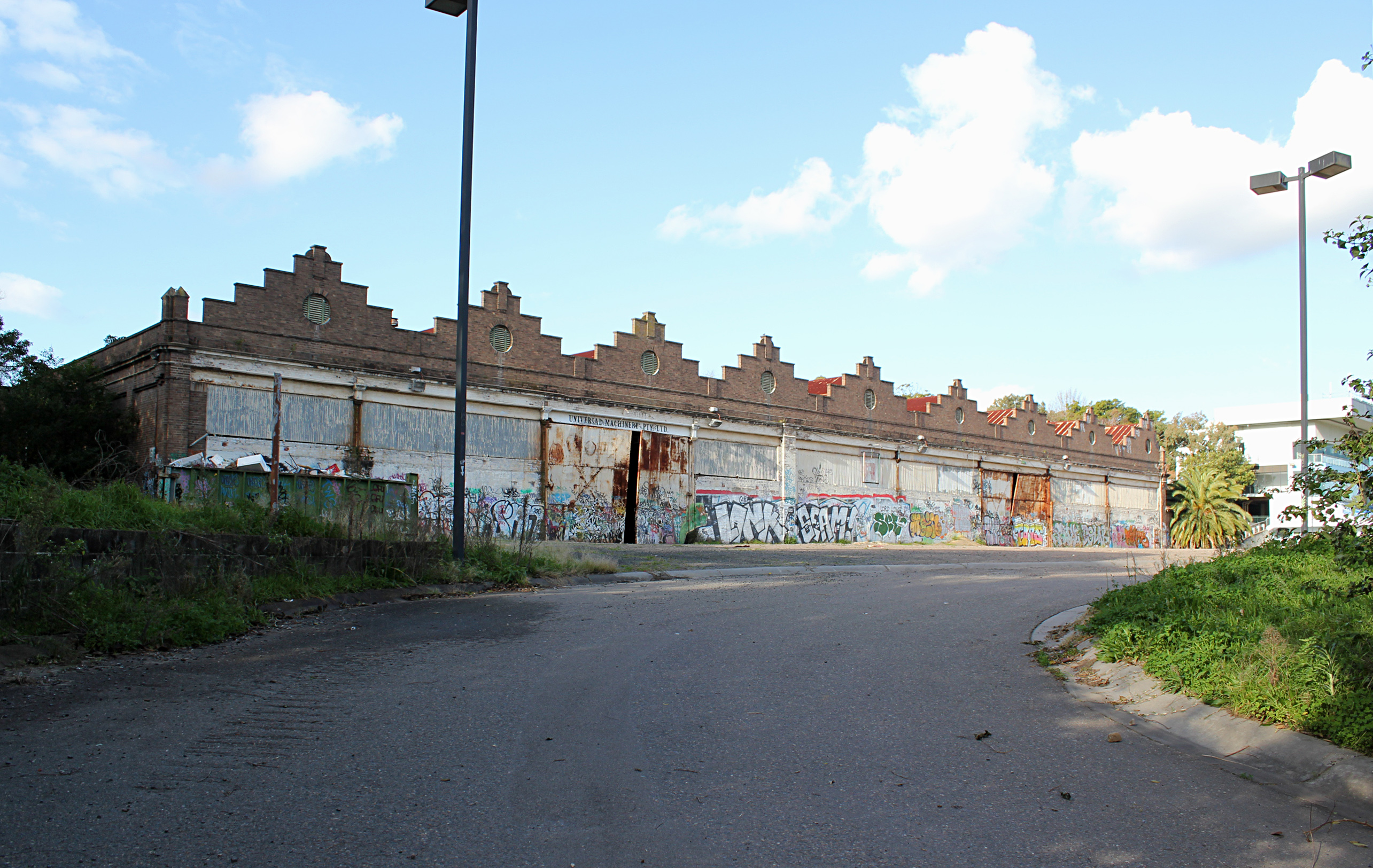
- Rozelle Tram Depot before redevelopment

Operation
- Locale: Glebe, New South Wales
- Open: 17 April 1904
- Close: 22 November 1958
- Status: Converted to shopping centre
- Operator: New South Wales Tramways

Infrastructure
- Track gauge: 4 ft 8 1/2 in (1,435 mm) standard gauge
- Depot: Rozelle Tram Depot

Rozelle Tram Depot is a former tram storage and operations centre that was part of the Sydney tram network. It is the largest remaining former tram depot in Sydney. In 2016, the tram depot was redeveloped into a retail complex known as Tramsheds.

== History ==
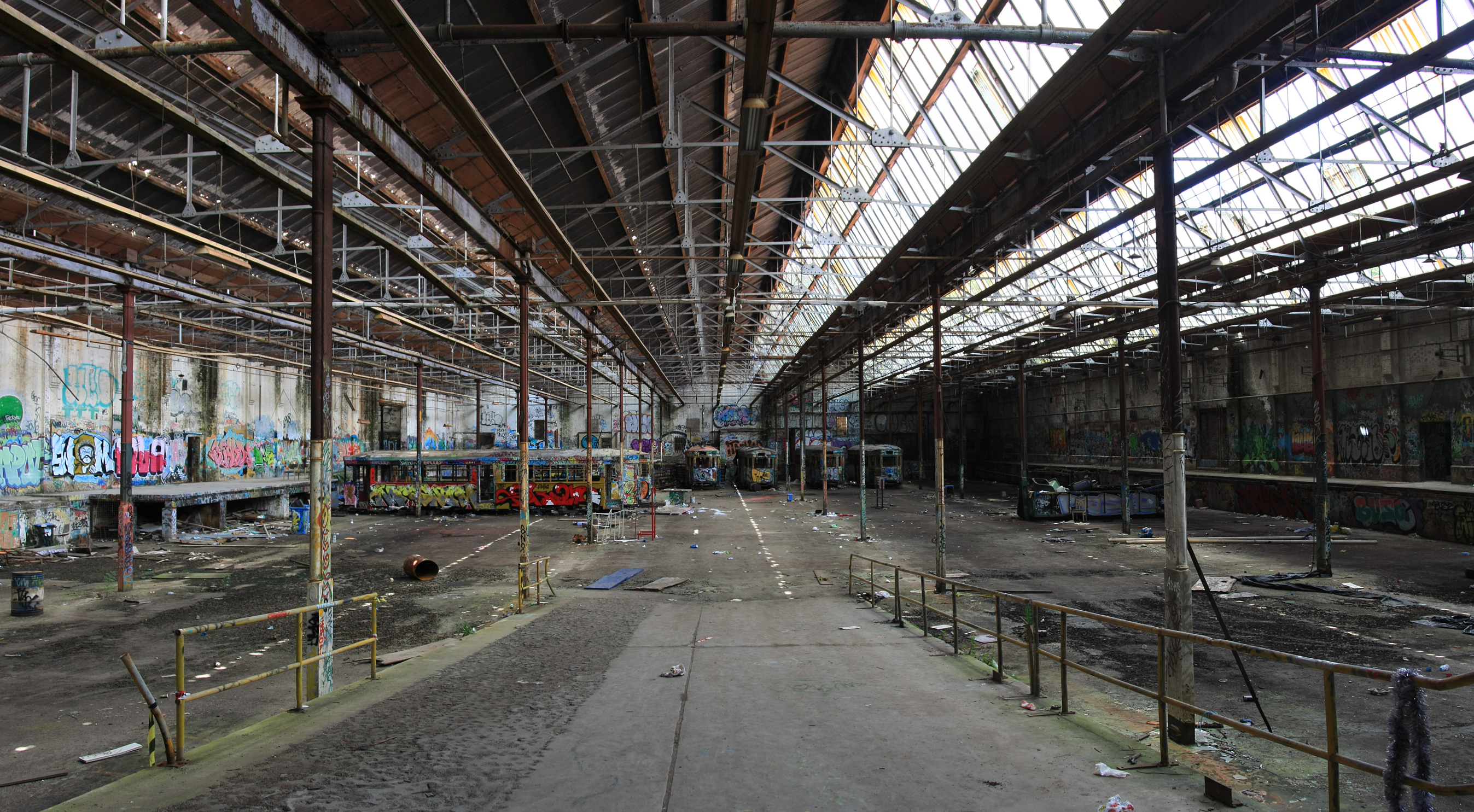
Interior of the vacant tram depot

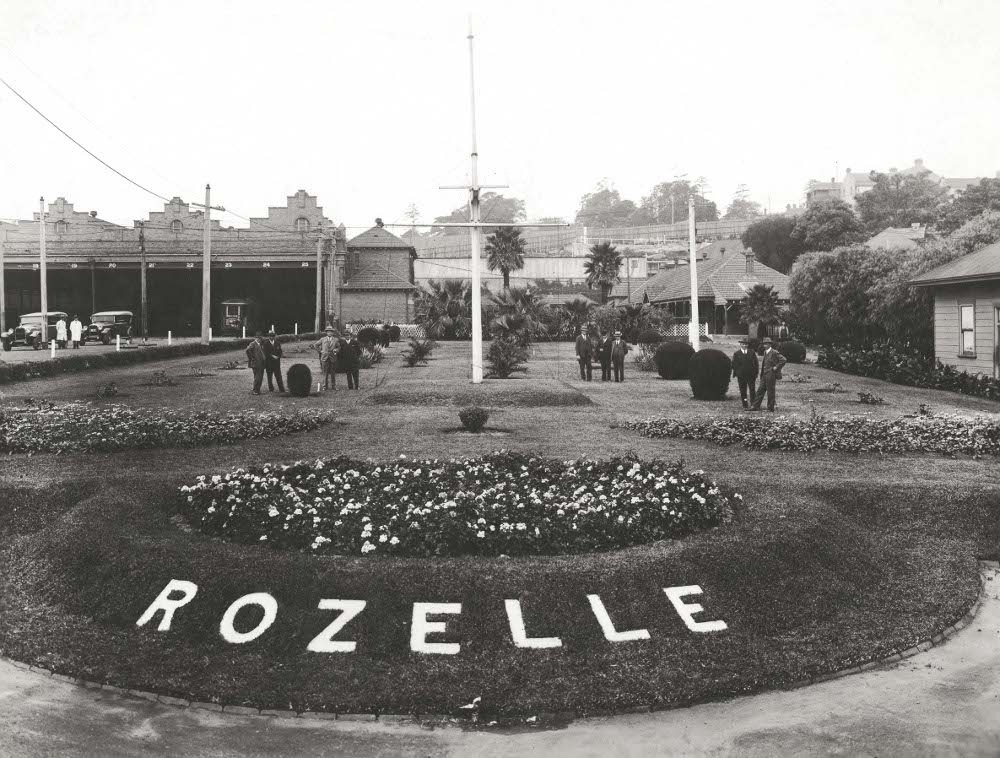
Depot gardens, 1919

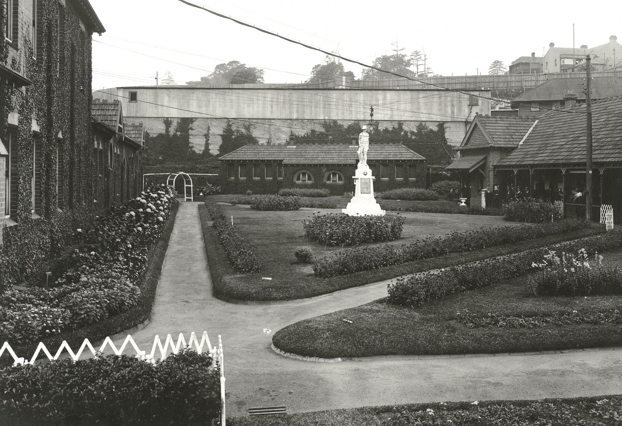
Another view of the depot gardens

Rozelle Tram Depot opened on 17 April 1904, working in conjunction with Newtown and Ultimo depots operating trams on the western, south-western and Ryde tram routes. The depot was originally accessed by a reserved track from Glebe which ran along what is now known as Minogue Crescent. Access to the depot was controlled by a signal box situated near the staff waiting room which also served as a changeover point for drivers.

Constructed in stages from 1904 the depot was a 25 road car shed accommodating 96 carriages, this was gradually increased to 125 by 1907. Construction of the second half of the depot in that same year saw the depot cater for an additional 70 trams. From 1918 depot capacity was increased to 200 tram cars.

In 1926 and 1928 the Rozelle Depot gardens won the Garden Competition which was held annually between tram depots.

A Returned Soldiers branch was established by Tramways employees and a Soldiers Memorial was erected on-site at the front of the Traffic Offices on 26 November 1916. This was to commemorate the various depot staff who served in both World War I and World War II. Of the 1,157 Tramway men enlisted during World War I, 139 were either killed or went missing.

Upon closure of Ultimo depot on 27 June 1953, Rozelle depot received additional trams to run the Darling Street Wharf to Canterbury route.

The depot ceased operations on 22 November 1958 upon closure of the Glebe line. On the following day the depot was cleared of all cars and the lines connecting the system were removed.

Soon after its closure the depot was leased out to several different parties, including CHEP, the Sydney City Council and the City Tram Association.

The depot at one stage contained six historic Sydney trams, some of which date back to the 1930s, as well as a Leyland Royal Tiger Worldmaster bus that has been heavily vandalised. The trams that were in near mint condition prior to 2000 were vandalised, stripped and painted with graffiti. Five of the trams belonging to the Sydney Tramway Society were originally acquired and stored in the shed as part of a now defunct plan by the City of Sydney council to introduce a heritage tramway to The Rocks. One of the trams was R1 class 1995, the last tram to operate on Sydney's original tram network, entering Randwick Tramway Workshops in February 1961 on the last day of operations.

In 1995 and 1996, the adjacent Harold Park Paceway was reconstructed and expanded over Johnstons Creek and the original tram depot access road. A new access road (now Dalgal Way) to the tram depot was constructed to the west of the tram sheds. All other freestanding buildings within the depot site were also demolished.

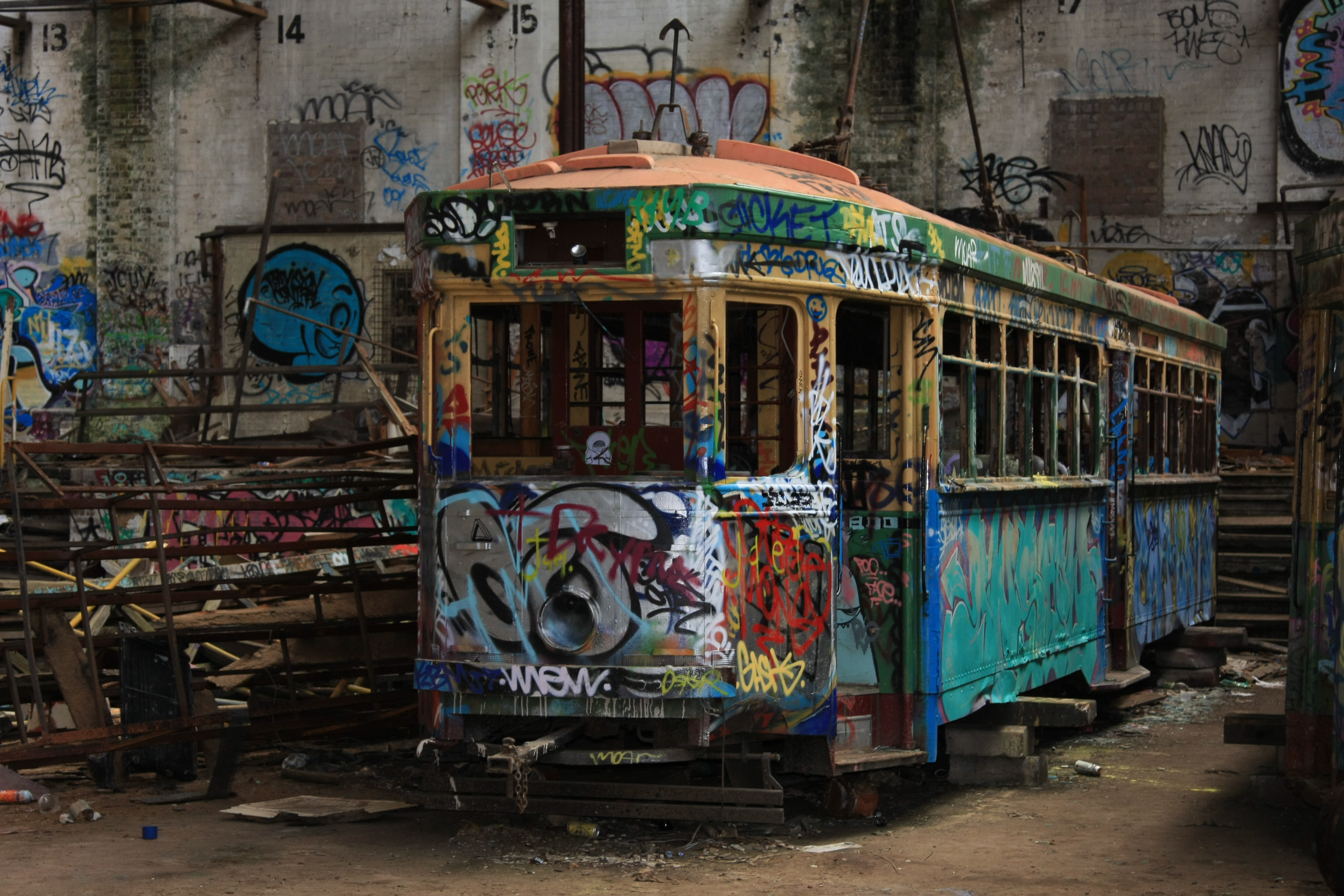
Before refurbishment at the vacant Rozelle Tram Depot, heavily vandalised

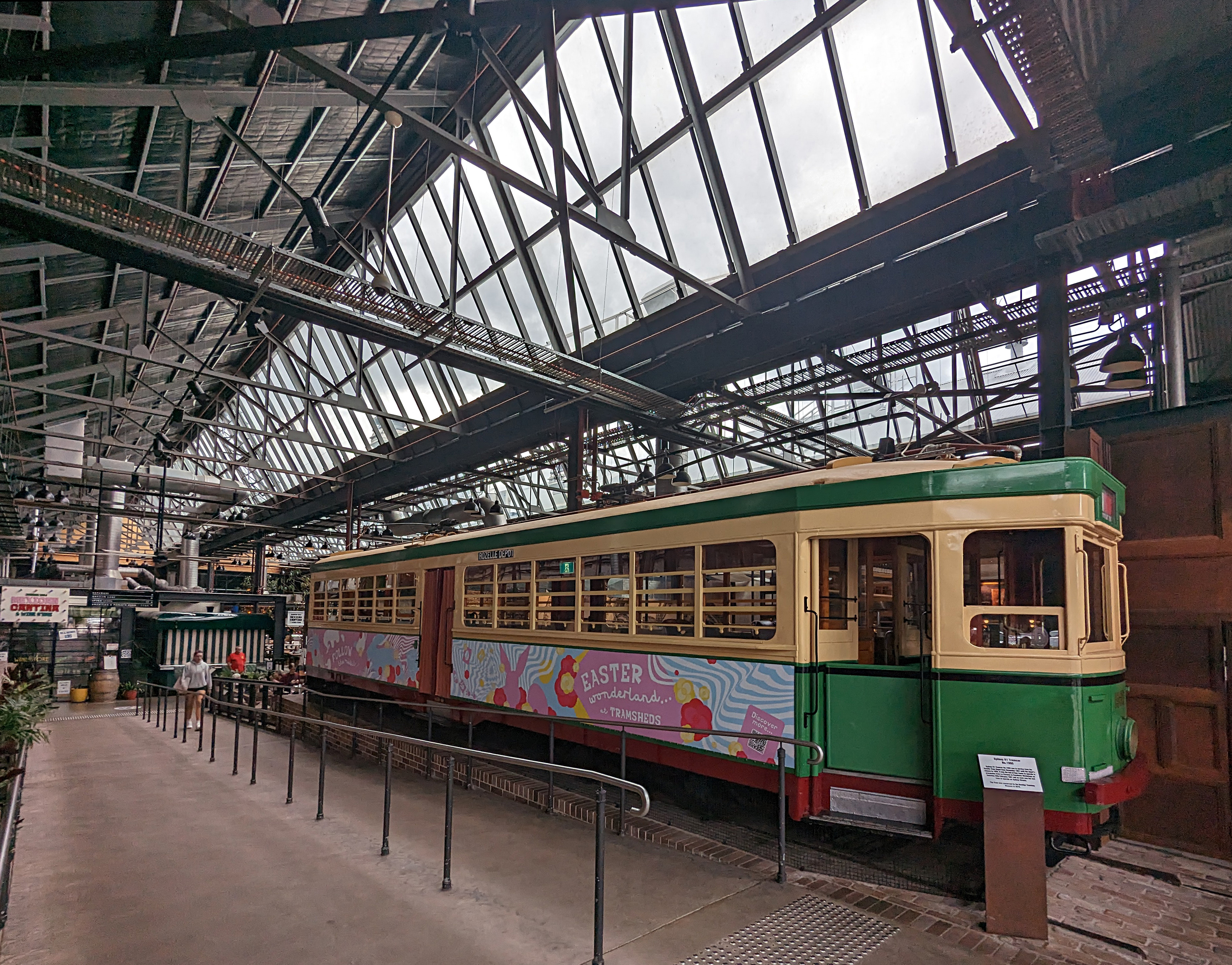
After refurbishment in Tramsheds

R1-class 1995, the last tram to have operated on Sydney's original tram network

Summary phases of the former Rozelle Tram Depot site until the 2000s:

- 1827–1904 Estuarine land, part of Toxteth Estate
- 1904–1909 Tram Depot Establishment
- 1904–1958 Tram Depot in Operation
- 1959–1980s Storage, Depot and Workshop
- 1980s–2004 General Store
- 2004–2012 Vacant Building

== Redevelopment ==
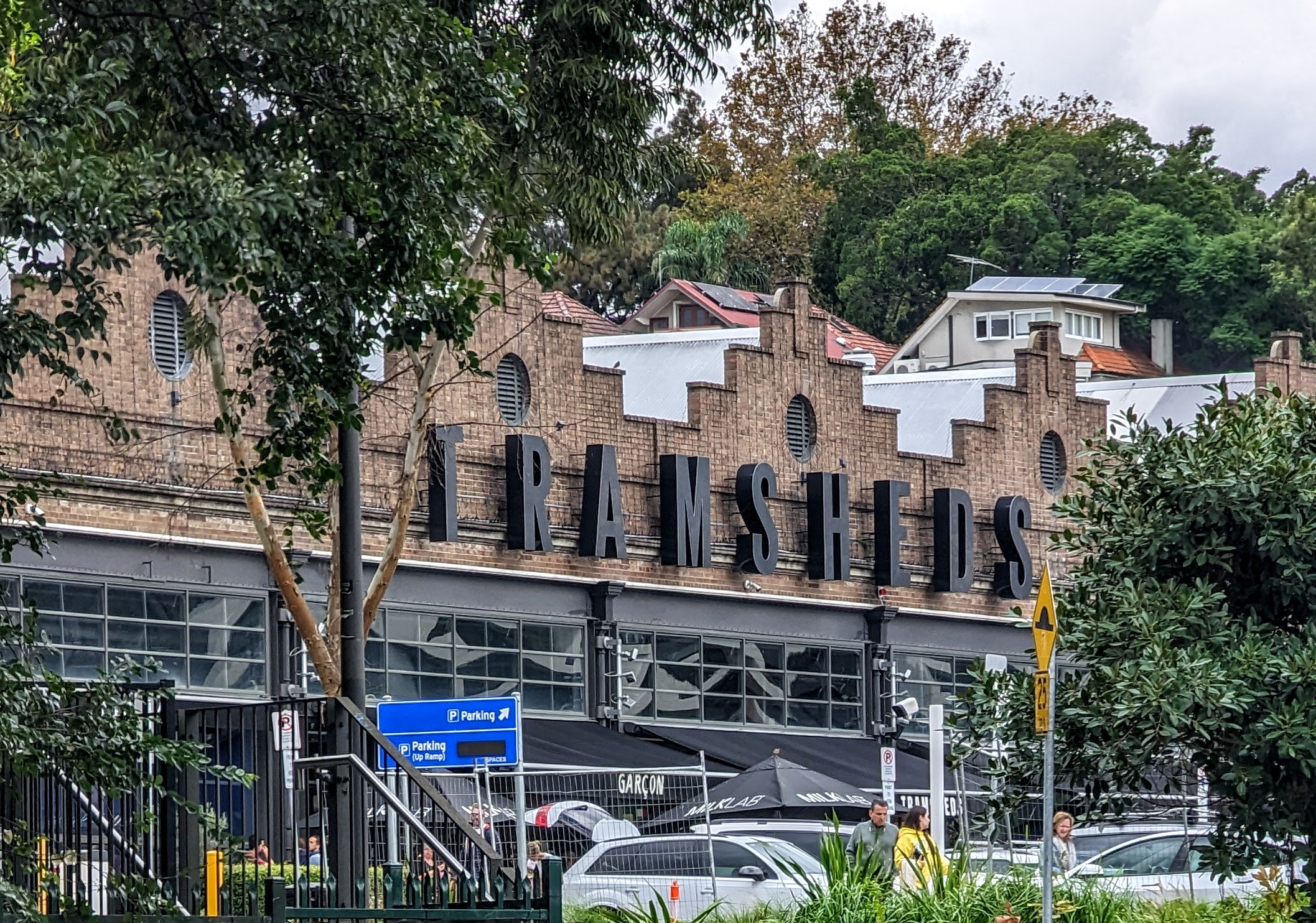
The Tramsheds retail complex in Glebe, 2023

A development proposal submitted in 2005 that included multi-storey apartments, underground car parking and commercial offices ran into opposition from residents. The site has been considered for a variety of uses, including a market, artists' studios, performance spaces.

On 10 December 2010 it was announced the entire Harold Park Paceway site had been purchased by Mirvac to be redeveloped for medium-density housing.

The last tram (number 1995) was removed in January 2015. The depot was then turned into the Tramsheds retail complex that opened in September 2016. Tram number 1995 was restored in Bendigo and returned for inclusion in the Tramsheds shopping centre.
