= O-class Sydney tram =

O-class
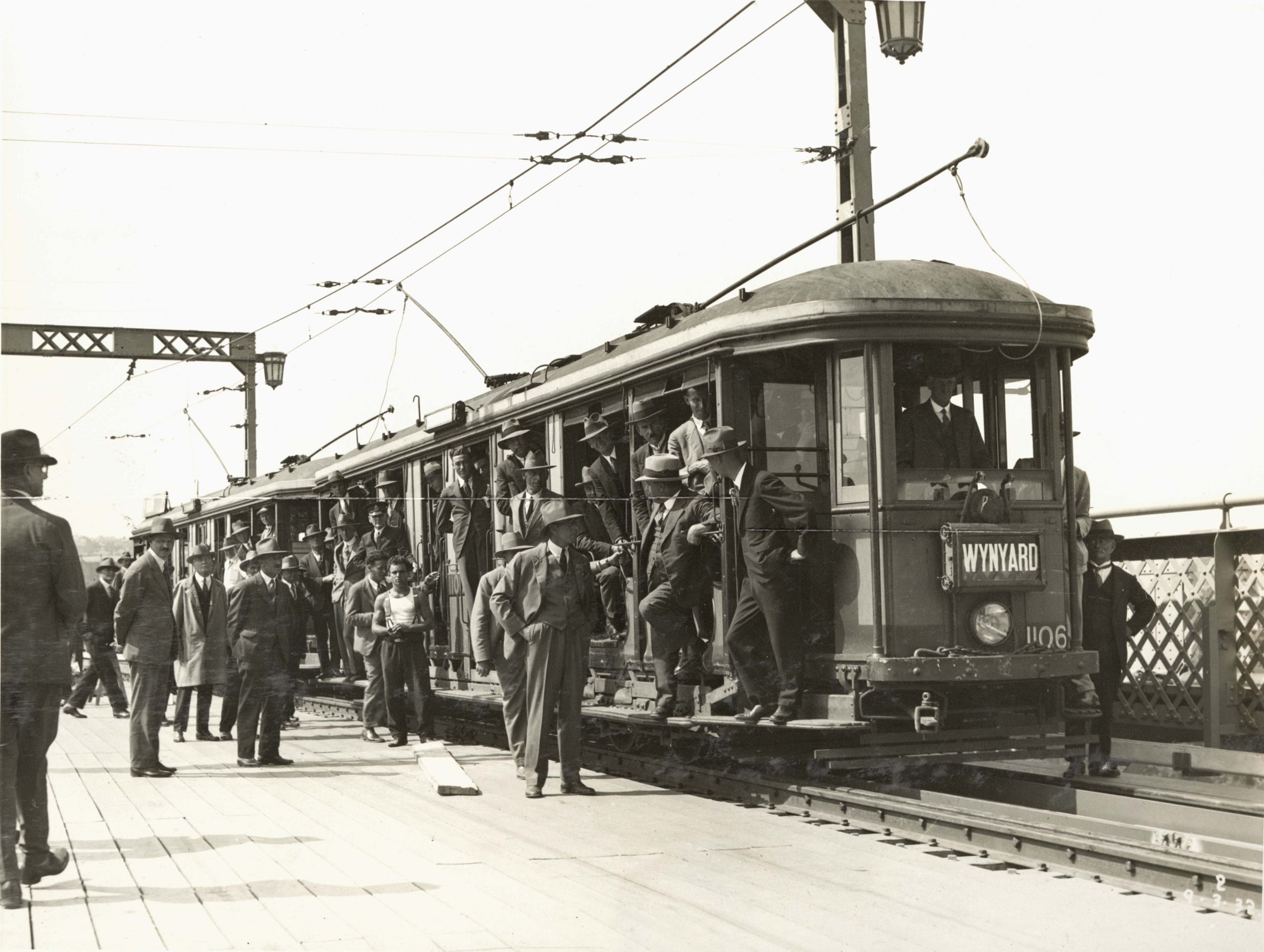
- O1106 at the Sydney Harbour Bridge opening in March 1932
- Manufacturer: Randwick Tramway Workshops; Meadowbank Manufacturing Company
- Constructed: 1907-14
- Number built: 626
- Fleet numbers: 803-947, 949-1278, 1330-1479
- Capacity: 80 (Seated); 48 (Standing)

Specifications
- Train length: 13.85 metres
- Width: 2.74 metres
- Height: 3.26 metres
- Maximum speed: 60 km/h
- Weight: 17.8 t
- Power output: 4 x 60 hp
- Electric system(s): 600 V DC catenary
- Current collector(s): Trolley pole
- Track gauge: 1,435 mm (4 ft 8 1/2 in)

The O-class trams were a class of trams operated on the Sydney tram network.

== History ==
A prototype (806) was built at Randwick Tramway Workshops in 1907, before the Meadowbank Manufacturing Company built a further 625 between 1908 and 1914. They were nicknamed Dreadnoughts, after a powerful British warship of the day, the Sydney press referred to them as Toastracks as all the seats were transverse or crossbench.

Between 1918 and 1946, eleven (855, 935, 943, 1007, 1089, 1170, 1241, 1372, 1383 and 1451) were rebuilt to resemble the P-class trams when heavy body repairs were required and reclassified as the O/P class. The last was withdrawn in 1958.

== Design ==
The O-class tram has a combination of enclosed and open sections. Ladies would generally sit in the enclosed compartments, while gentlemen sat in the open compartments. In the centre are the four closed sections, accessible to the street via sliding doors and fitted with cross bench timber seats. On either side of these are the two open compartments, each fitted with two facing cross bench seats with metal armrests. These two sections have pull-down canvas blinds to protect passengers against the elements. Enclosed driver's compartments at each end are joined to the open compartments.

== Service ==
The O-class tramcars were the backbone of the Sydney fleet for 40 years and saw service on all the Sydney electrified lines at various periods and were loved by both passengers and tram crews. They were especially suited to venues such as race meetings, sporting matches and the Royal Easter Show as they could be emptied and filled quickly by means of the numerous doorways.

== Preservation ==
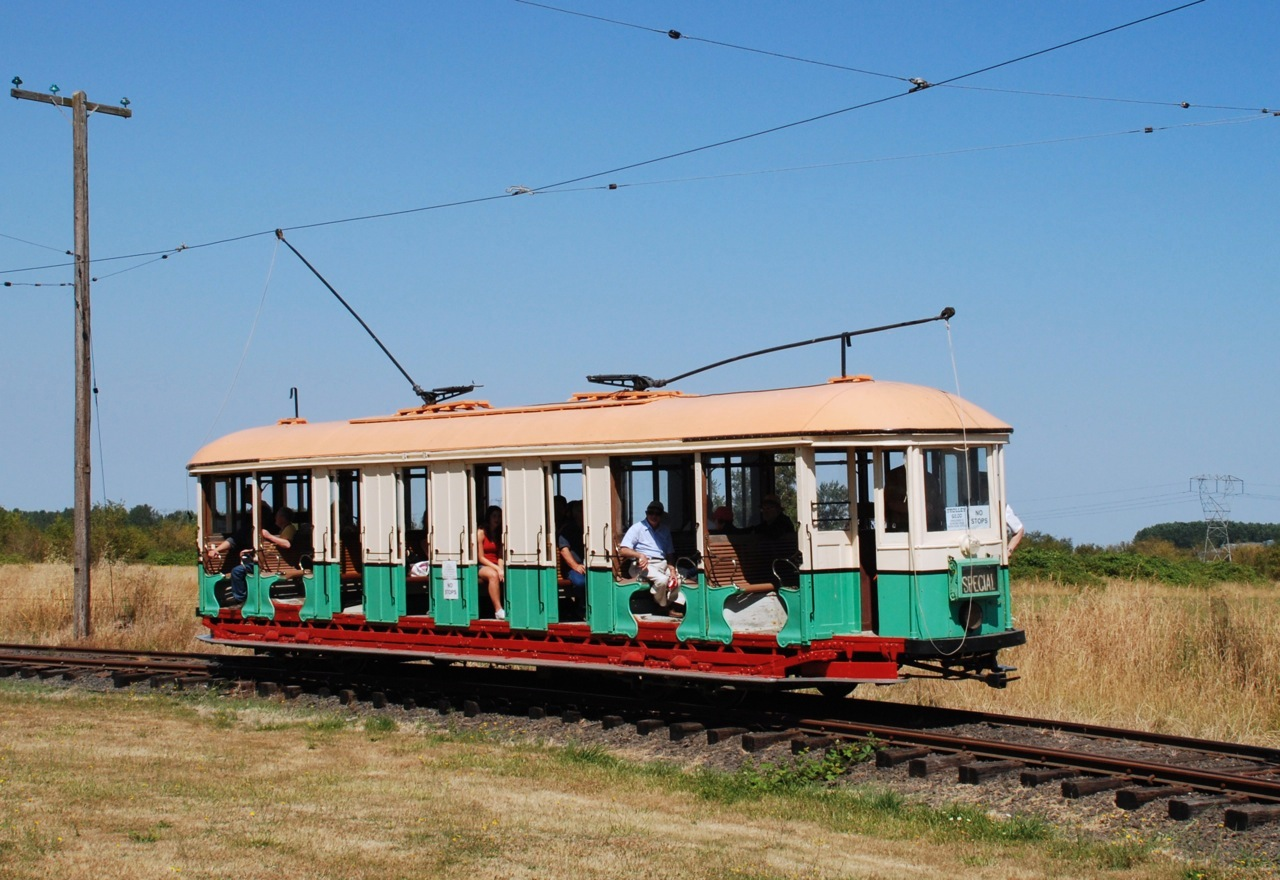
No. 1187 preserved in operating condition in Oregon, United States

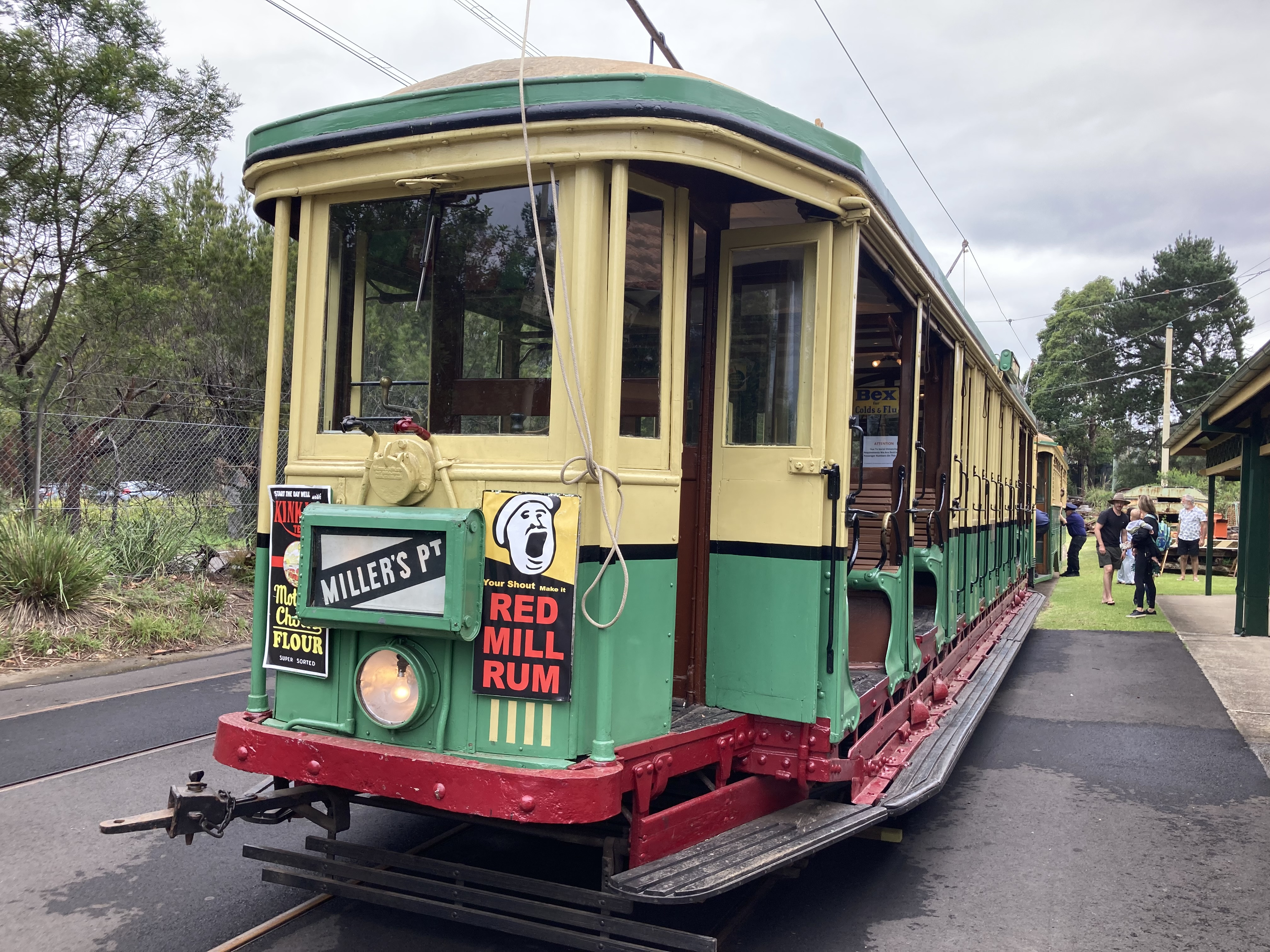
No. 1111 preserved in operating condition at the Sydney Tramway Museum

Six have been preserved:

- 805 owned by Powerhouse Museum on loan to Sydney Tramway Museum
- 1111 and 141s (Breakdown tram conversion, formerly 1030) in operational condition at the Sydney Tramway Museum
- 957 and 1089 (as O/P configuration) under restoration at the Sydney Tramway Museum
- 1187 at the Oregon Electric Railway Museum
