= D-class Sydney tram =

D-class
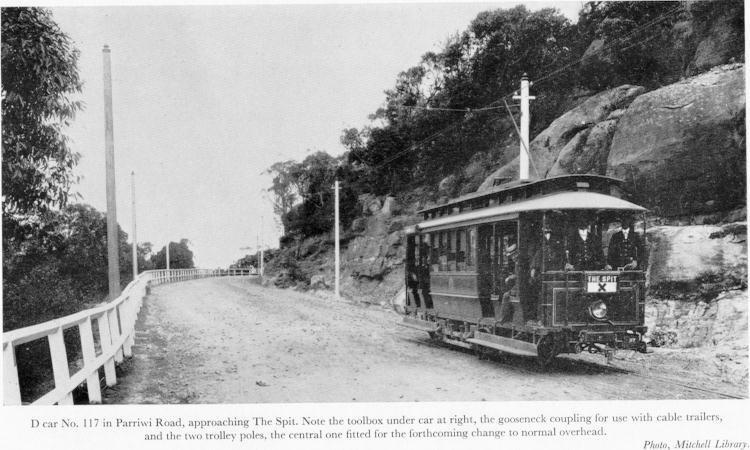
- D117 at The Spit
- Manufacturer: Clyde Engineering; Ritchie Brothers
- Constructed: 1896-99
- Number built: 25
- Fleet numbers: 93-121, 123
- Capacity: 32-34 (Seated)

Specifications
- Train length: 9.40 metres
- Width: 2.22 metres
- Height: 3.70 metres
- Maximum speed: 60 km/h
- Weight: 9.66 t
- Power output: 4 x 36 hp (later 60)
- Electric system(s): 600 V DC catenary
- Current collection: Trolley pole
- Track gauge: 1,435 mm (4 ft 8 1/2 in)

The D-class trams are a class of single bogie Californian Combination type trams operated on the Sydney tram network with open cross benches at the ends and a saloon in the centre. Seating capacity was originally 32, later being increased to 34.

134s (D102), 136s (D106), 112s (D117), 137s (D119) and 43s (D123) always operated from Randwick Workshops. 131s (D99) saw service at Newcastle, along with 135s (D103) which later saw service at North Sydney. 132s (D105) and 133s (D116) saw service at both Enfield and North Sydney.

43s was scrapped at Randwick, 112s was sold to a private buyer; 137s went to Brisbane as number 16 in their works roster, and 134s went to the Sydney Tramway Museum.

== Preservation ==
Two have been preserved:

- 102 at the Sydney Tramway Museum, converted to track scrubber in 1930 and renumbered 134s, and is operational. After retirement to the Sydney Tramway Museum, it was used as a track scrubber on:
  - the Eastern Suburbs railway line between:
    - 13 October 1978 and 22 November 1978
    - between 24 March 1979 and 15 June 1979
  - the Cronulla railway line 15 July 1983
  - the Wentworth Park light rail line in 1997
- 117 at the Sydney Tramway Museum, converted to breakdown car 112s in 1913 and has been returned to passenger configuration, however it is awaiting final fit out of the electrical works.

The truck from 137s (D119, Brisbane Works 16) was donated to the Sydney Tramway Museum when the car was taken out of service in Brisbane.
