= Meadowbank Manufacturing Company =

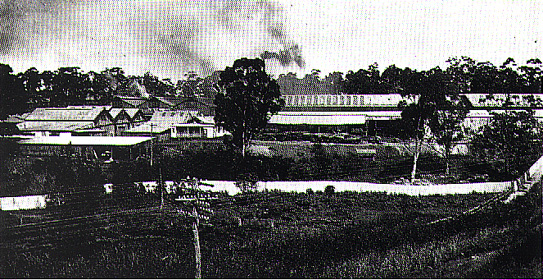
- Meadowbank Manufacturing Company workshops in 1922
- Industry: Railway rolling stock manufacturing
- Founded: 1890
- Founder: Mellor Brothers
- Defunct: 1930
- Headquarters: Meadowbank

Meadowbank Manufacturing Company was an Australian manufacturer in Meadowbank, New South Wales.

== History ==
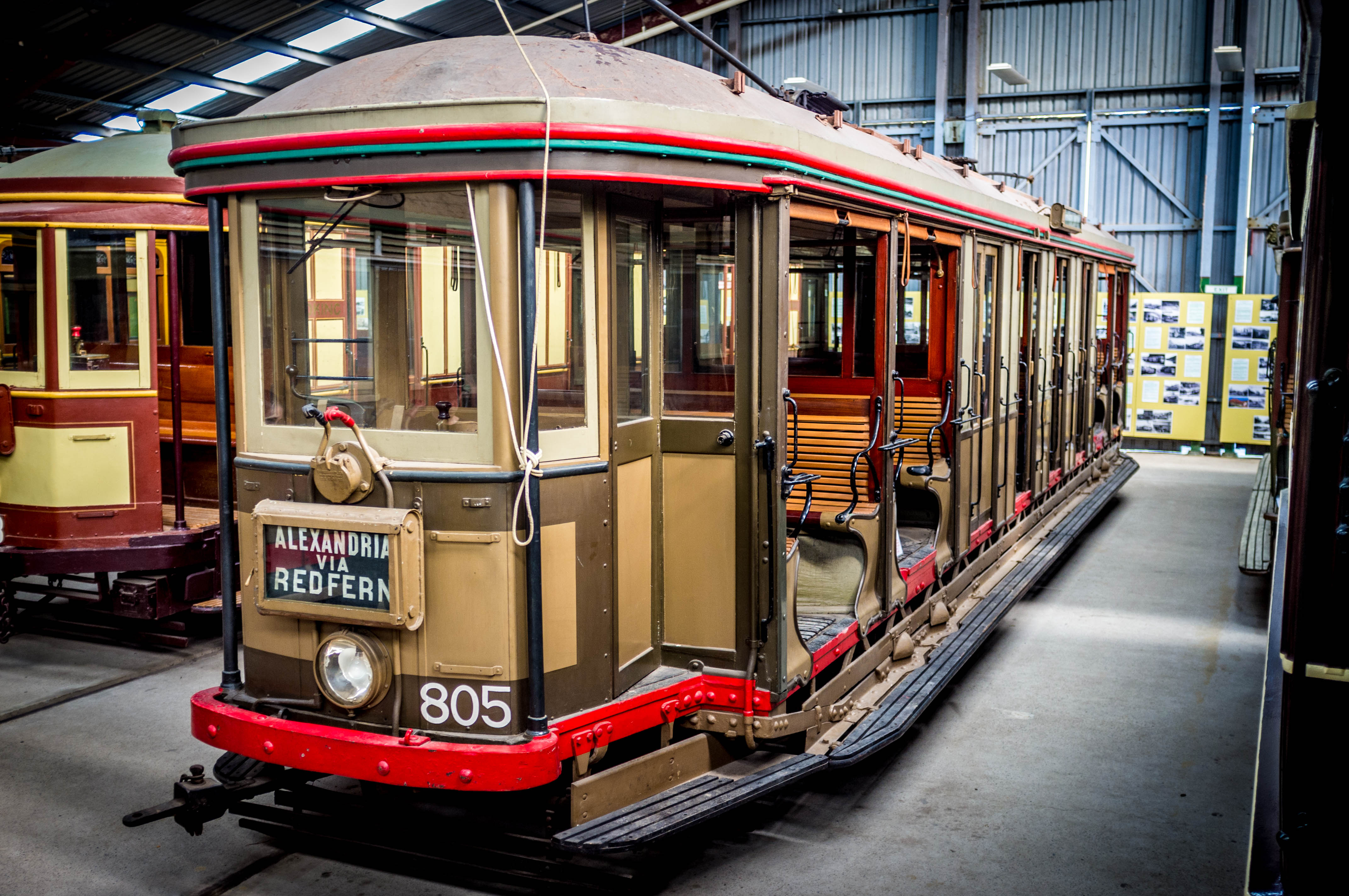
Preserved O class tram in at the Sydney Tramway Museum in September 2013

Mellor Brothers, a South Australian firm, established factories in Sydney (Meadowbank Manufacturing Co) and Melbourne (Braybrook Implement Co) in 1890 to manufacture agricultural equipment. Braybrook was taken over by Hugh Victor McKay in the early 1900s and that site became the Sunshine Harvester Works.

The company purchased the 95 acre Isaac Shepherd "Helenie" estate on the Parramatta River adjacent to Meadowbank station. This property had plenty of timber, building stone and sand to construct the factory buildings, with enough left to sell to offset costs. The company purchased the Mellor patents for its stump jump plough.

The company grew to be one of the largest engineering companies in New South Wales along with Clyde Engineering, Tulloch Limited and Ritchie Brothers. It was renowned for hiring and training many returned servicemen after the First World War. It was floated on the stock exchange in 1923 with capital of £100,000 in £1 shares. The company closed in 1930 and in 1938 an auction of all remaining assets was held.

== Products ==
Original products included the manufacture of stump-jump implements, strippers, windmills, pumps, horse-rakes, wheat separators, ploughs, harrows, scarifiers and other agricultural and general implements. The firm later produced tramcars and railway rolling stock, assembled Ford Model Ts, and manufactured a range of stationary engines. It manufactured over 600 O class trams, which were not only used in Sydney, but also Brisbane, Melbourne, Ballarat and Bendigo. It manufactured many different types of rolling stock such as brake vans, coal wagons, Bradfield suburban carriages, 12-wheel carriages for the New South Wales Government Railways and sleeper carriages for the Trans-Australian Railway in 1915. There was a large fire in 1908 that totally destroyed the carriage shop and some completed railway carriages ready for delivery, as well as many uncompleted carriages and trams. This resulted in 150 men losing their jobs. Stationary engines were made in several sizes for general use, initially copies of the Scottish Melvin. The Commonwealth Government purchased both horizontal and vertical engines for use on the Trans-Australian Railway for pumping water into overhead tanks for the steam locomotives.

== Manufacturing facilities ==
Land at Meadowbank adjacent to the Main North line was cleared, a railway siding built and a tram road made to the wharf. The house built by the manager, originally called Bartonville (now The Laurels) survives. This industry resulted in a growing number of houses occupied by company employees.

== Demise ==
The Meadowbank Manufacturing Company was closed due to the Great Depression. In 1929, there were large lay-offs of men and, by September 1930, the company had closed. Ryde Council acquired the land for a planned sandstone quarry but the State Government took it over and built Meadowbank TAFE, and the balance was subdivided for housing.

== Gallery ==
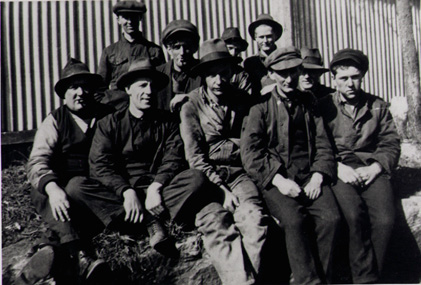
Meadowbank Manufacturing Company around 1930

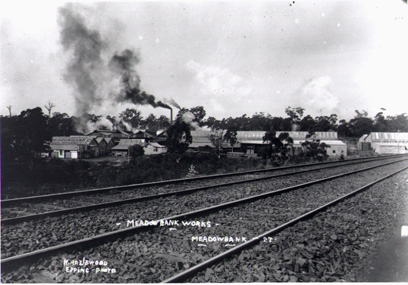
Meadowbank Works, Meadowbank around 1915

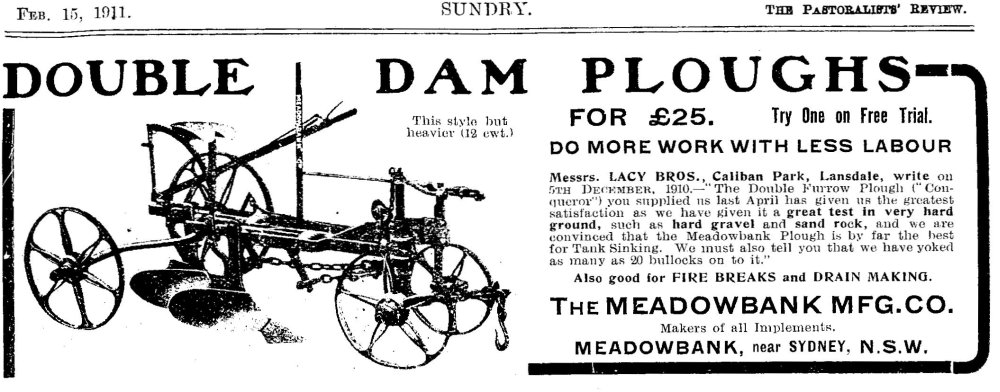
Company Advertising from the Pastoralists Review
