= Ritchie Brothers =

Auburn-based manufacturer of train rolling stock in Sydney, Australia

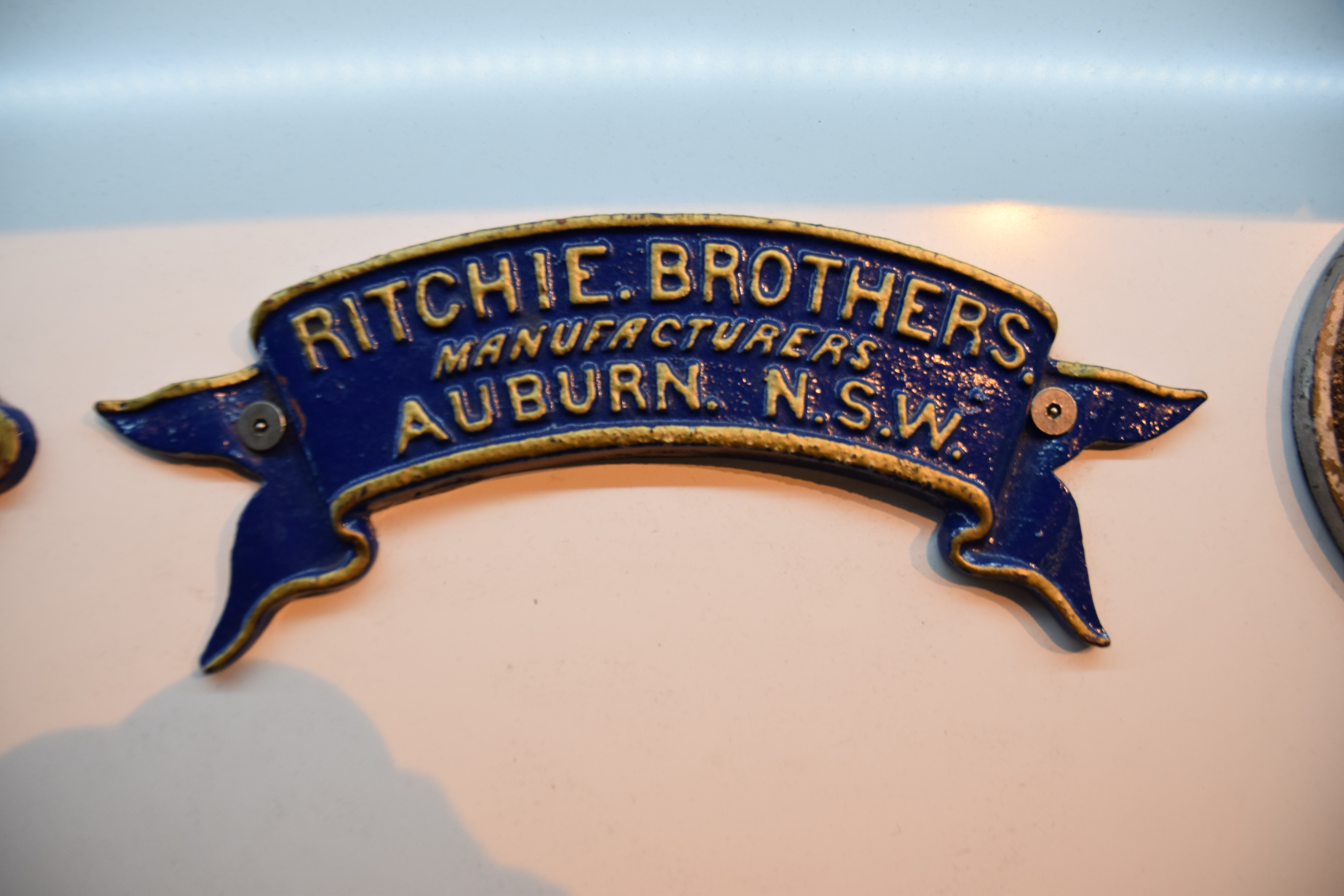
- Builder's plate at the NSW Rail Museum, Thirlmere, 2016
- Industry: Rolling stock manufacturing
- Founded: 1857
- Defunct: 1950s
- Headquarters: Auburn
- Products: Railway carriages Trams

Ritchie Brothers was an Australian railway rolling stock and tram manufacturer based in the Sydney suburb of Auburn.

== History ==
In 1857, Robert Ritchie took over the blacksmith business of Joseph Whiting of Parramatta. In 1876, Ritchie was awarded a contract by the Government of New South Wales for 150 wagons. In 1882, the business relocated to Marion Street, Auburn.

Ritchie Brothers built carriages for the New South Wales Government Railways including American suburban carriages, Wooden motor, Silver City Comet, 500 class trailers and 72 foot carriages. It also built D and N class trams for the Sydney tram network, and also built bodies for the three-axle double-deck trolleybuses used at Kogarah in Sydney.

It closed in the 1950s with the plant and equipment sold to Australian Electrical Industries.
