= R1-class Sydney tram =

R1-class
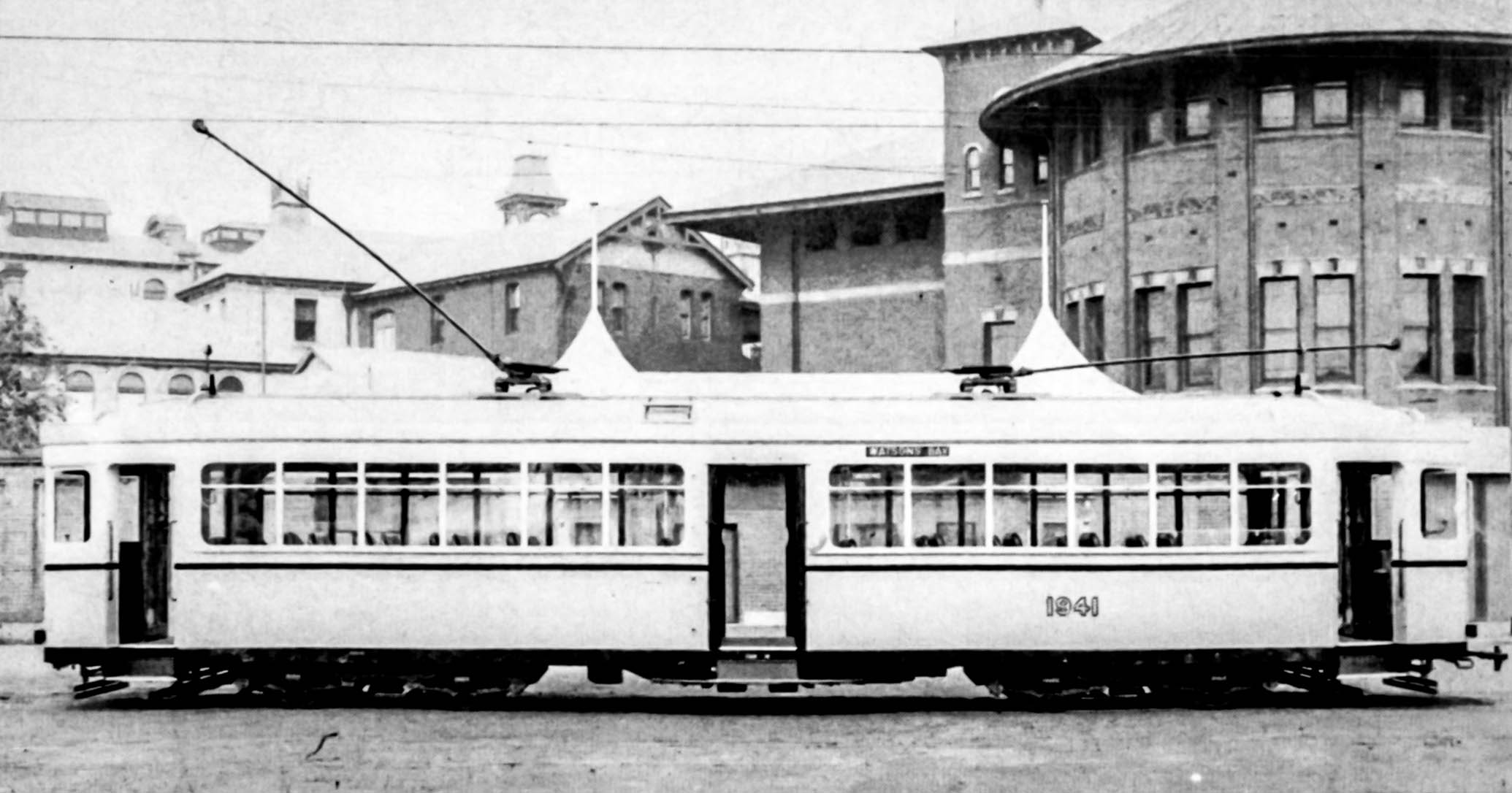
- R1 class at Sydney Showground
- Manufacturers: Clyde Engineering; Commonwealth Engineering
- Constructed: 1935 and 1950-1953
- Number built: 155
- Fleet numbers: 1933-2087
- Capacity: 56 (Seated)

Specifications
- Train length: 14.35 metres
- Width: 2.74 metres
- Height: 3.26 metres
- Maximum speed: 60 km/h
- Weight: 17.9 t
- Power output: 4 x 40 hp
- Electric system: 600 V DC catenary
- Current collection: Trolley pole
- Track gauge: 1,435 mm (4 ft 8 1/2 in)

The R1-class trams were a class of trams operated on the Sydney tram network. Their design was a development of the R class.

== History ==
When Clyde Engineering were delivering the last of the R class in 1935, it was decided to modify the final five to a design with a reduced drop-centre, eight more seats, no internal partitions, and one less door each side. These modified trams were classified as R1 class, and a further 50 were ordered from Clyde. In the late 1940s, a further 250 were ordered from Commonwealth Engineering. Steel shortages delayed their construction, with the first not delivered until September 1950. During construction the order was reduced to 100, with the last delivered to North Sydney depot on 17 September 1953.

The original five tramcars modified in 1935 (numbers 1933 to 1937) could be distinguished from later production runs by their side windows (which indicated the original door spacing for the R class) and the underframe which was built to accommodate a larger drop-centre.

One car, 2029, was fitted with dynamic braking, for use on the steep Neutral Bay line, from 1952 to when the line closed in 1956.

One (2018) was written off after a single day in a traffic accident at Petersham. Most remained in service until the end of tram operations in 1961.

When the Sydney tramway system closed, some of the class were disposed of by burning at Randwick Workshops, despite some being less than 8 years old at time of being burnt.

== Preservation ==
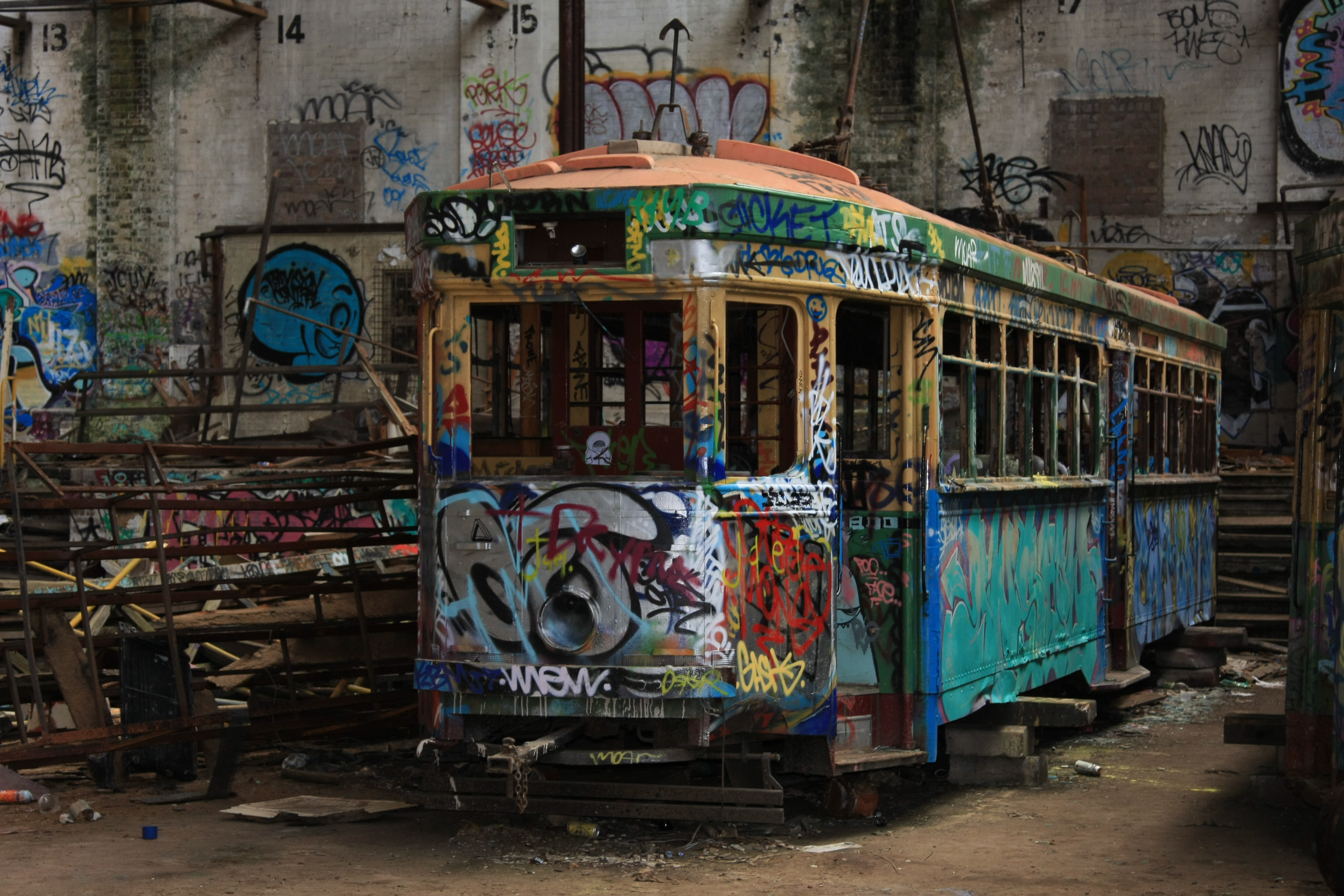
Before refurbishment at the vacant Rozelle Tram Depot, heavily vandalised

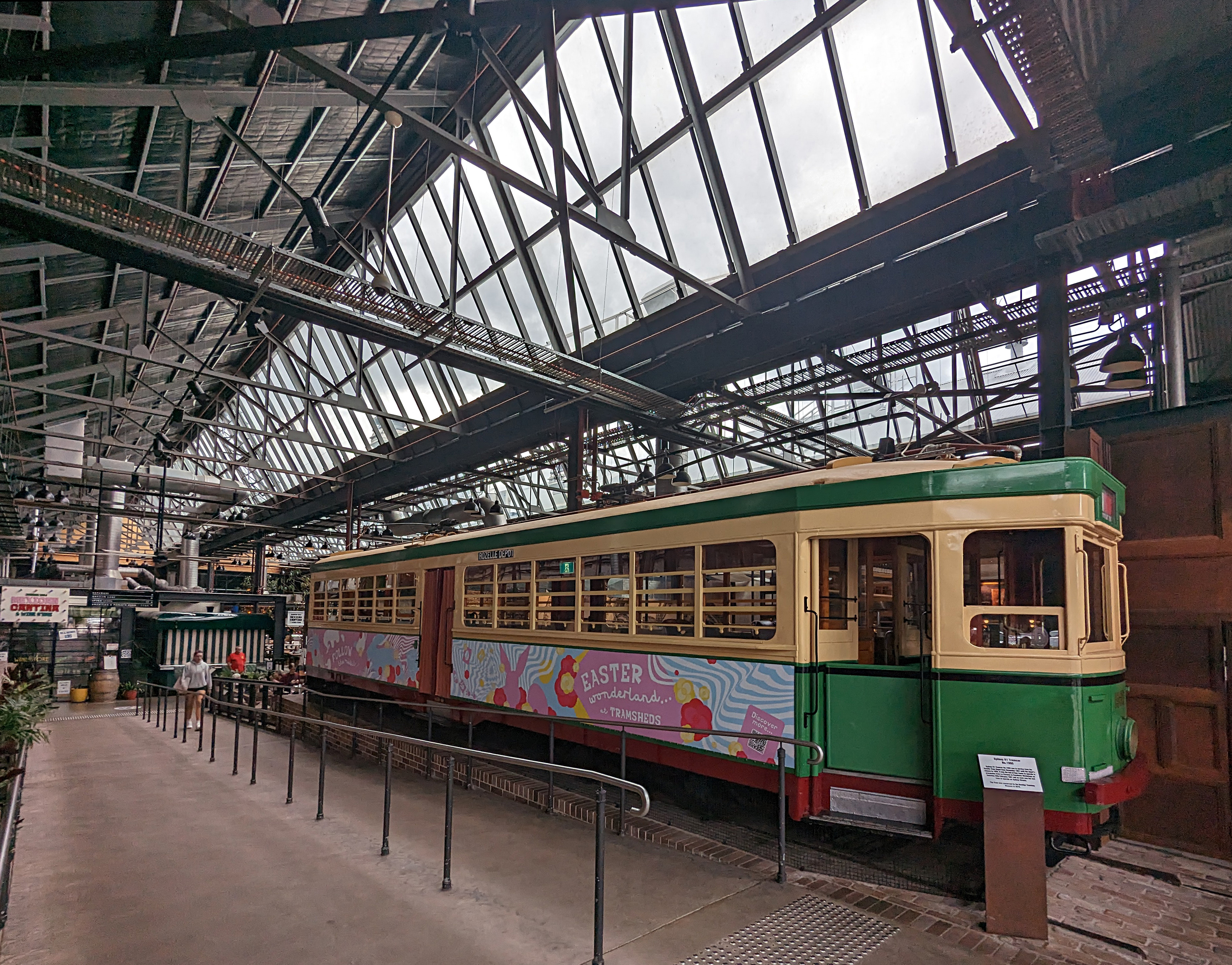
After refurbishment in Tramsheds (redeveloped Rozelle depot)

R1-class 1995, the last tram to have operated on Sydney's original tram network

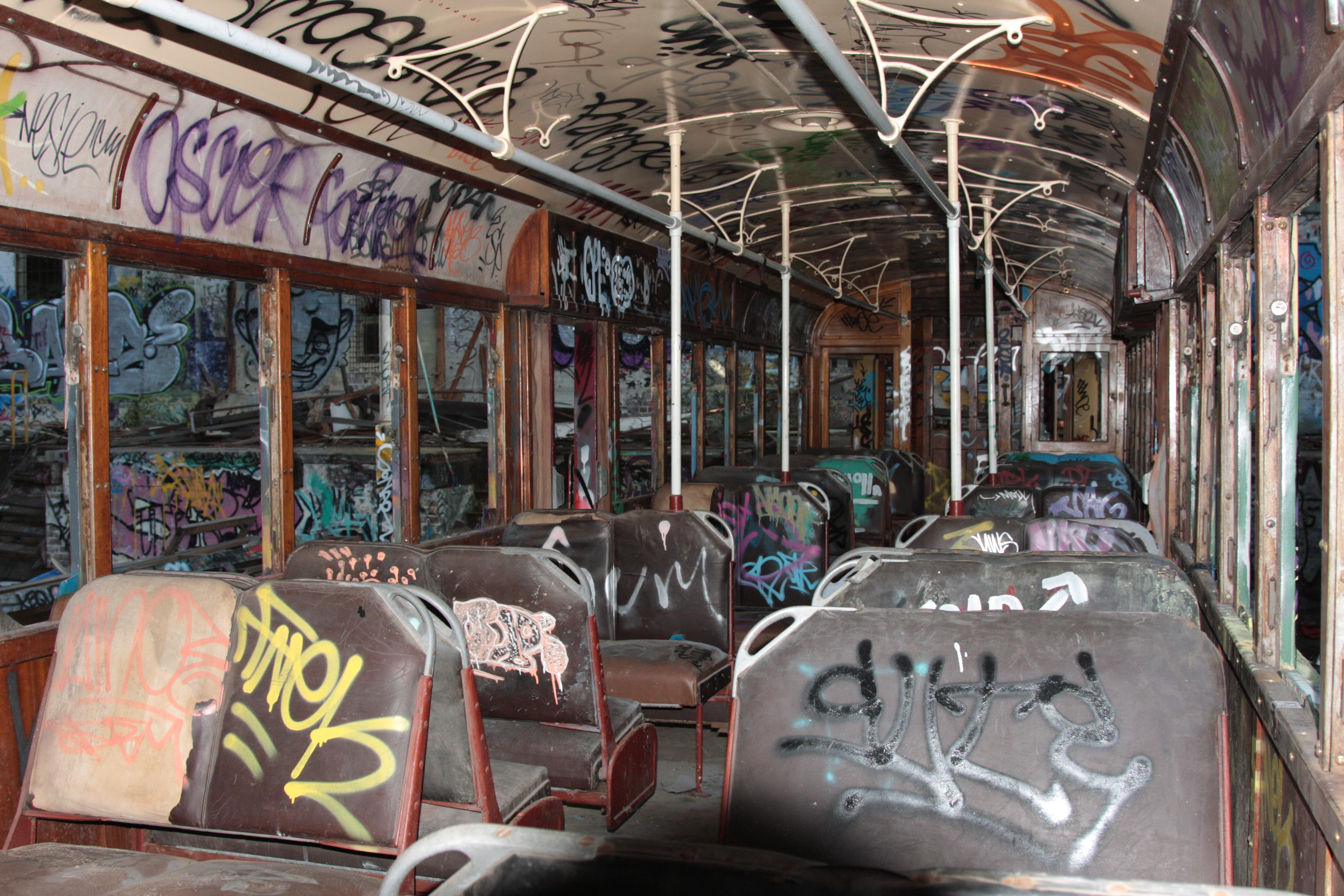
The interior of vandalised tram 1995 prior to refurbishment

Ten have been preserved:

- 1933, 1951, 1979, 2001 and 2044 at the Sydney Tramway Museum
- 1971 on loan from the Sydney Tramway Museum to the Tramway Museum, St Kilda
- 1995 the last tram to run in Sydney, statically displayed in the redeveloped Rozelle Tram Depot, the Tramsheds retail complex.
- 1936 at The Brisbane Tramway Museum, Ferny Grove (yet to be restored)
- 1948 and 2064 retained privately
