= Dowling Street Tram Depot =

Part of Sydney tram network

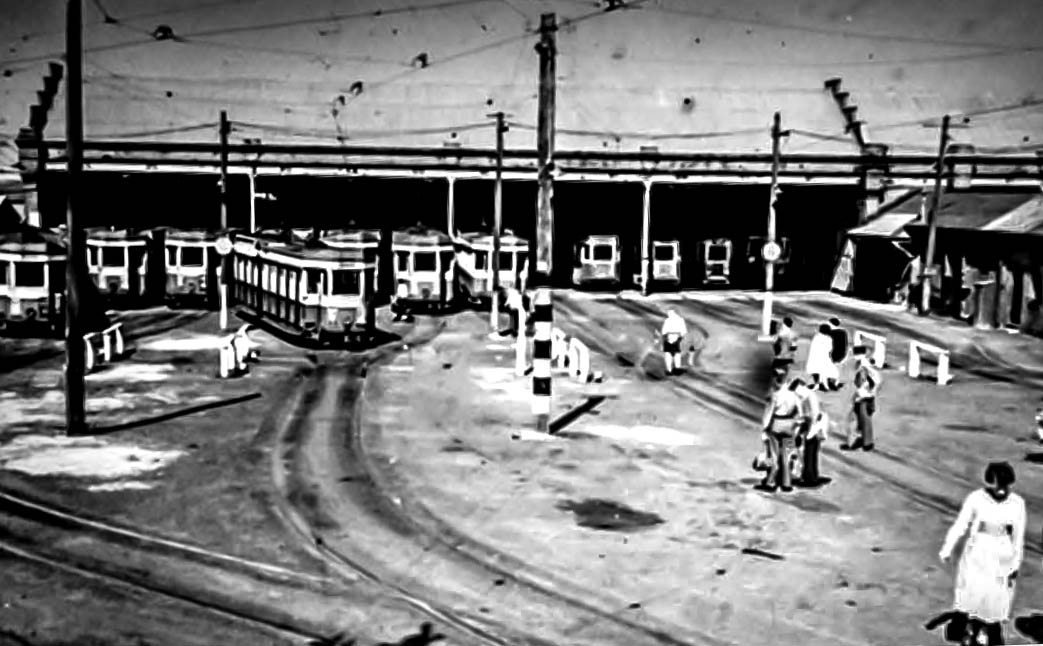
- Interactive map of Dowling Street Tram Depot

Location
- Location: Cnr Dacey Ave & Dowling St Moore Park
- Coordinates: 33°54′04″S 151°12′58″E

Characteristics
- Operator: New South Wales Tramways

History
- Opened: 25 January 1909
- Closed: 25 February 1961

Dowling Street Tram Depot was part of the Sydney tram network. It was the largest tram depot in Australia.

== History ==
Dowling Street Tram Depot opened on 25 January 1909. The 27 road shed provided trams on the Coogee, La Perouse, Clovelly, Maroubra, Alexandria, Rosebery and Botany routes. It closed on 25 February 1961. After closure, the site was leased to Brambles before being redeveloped as the Supa Centa Moore Park shopping centre.

== Design ==
It was the largest tram depot in Australia with twenty-seven roads. Design included:

- 27 tracks
- Plain front parapet
- Step gabled side walls
- Roof orientation to south
