= Ultimo Tram Depot =

Sydney tram depot

- Main Sydney Tram System
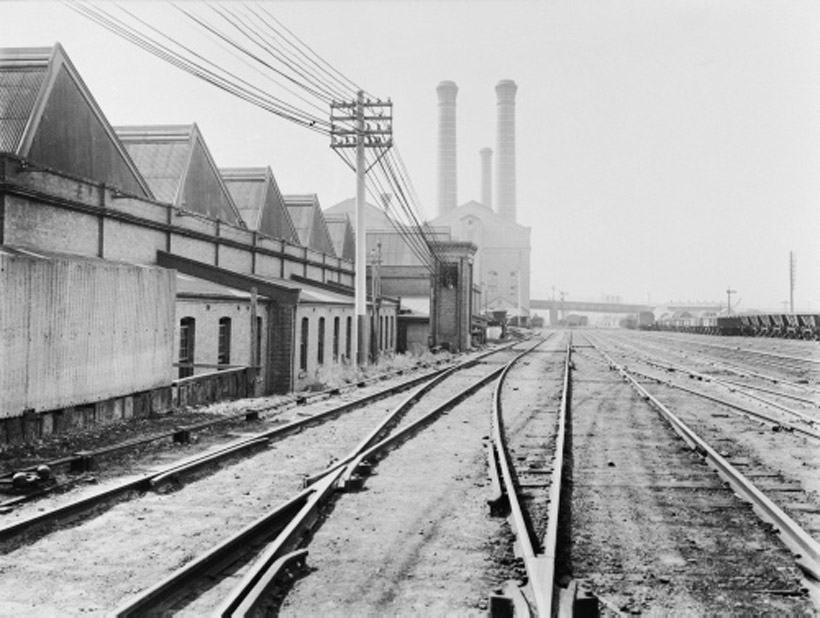
- Ultimo Power Station and Tram Depot on the left, Darling Harbour railway on the right

Operation
- Locale: Harris Street, Ultimo
- Open: 8 December 1899
- Close: 27 June 1953
- Operator: New South Wales Tramways

Infrastructure
- Track gauge: 1,435 mm (4 ft 8 1/2 in)
- Depot: Ultimo Tram Depot

Ultimo Tram Depot was part of the Sydney tram network.

== History ==
Ultimo Tram Depot opened on 8 December 1899 adjacent to the Ultimo Power Station. It was the depot for trams operating services to Pyrmont, Ryde, and Erskineville. It was situated on the eastern side of Harris Street adjacent to the Darling Harbour railway line.

The depot closed on 27 June 1953 following the decision to replace trams with buses on the Drummoyne service. The staff of 250 drivers, conductors, inspectors, and maintenance men, with 21 trams, have been transferred to other depots.

The tram sheds were converted to offices in 1981 as part of the Powerhouse Museum development. The building was listed by the National Trust in 1997.

== Design ==
- 12 tracks
- Plain front parapet
- Corrugated iron side walls at the roof
- South roof orientation
- The front elevation and roof have been rebuilt.
- Frame removed and entry rebuilt during conversion to offices in 1980s
