= Glendinning =

Glendinning is a surname of Scottish origin. Notable people with the surname include:

- Brian Glendinning (1934–2020), English footballer
- Chellis Glendinning (born 1947), American psychotherapist
- Ernest Glendinning (1884–1936), British-born American stage actor
- James Glendinning (1844–1902), Scottish-born American politician
- James Glendinning (1849–1929), Canadian politician
- Kevin Glendinning (born 1962), English footballer
- Mark Glendinning (born 1970), Northern Irish footballer
- Paul Glendinning, English mathematician
- Robert Glendinning (1844–1928), Irish politician
- Robin Glendinning (1938–2025), Northern Irish playwright and politician
- Ross Glendinning (born 1956), Australian footballer, after whom the Ross Glendinning Medal is named
- S. Gail Glendinning, American physicist
- Simon Glendinning (born 1964), English philosopher, son of Victoria
- Victoria Glendinning (born 1937), English writer, mother of Paul
- Will Glendinning, Northern Irish politician

== See also ==
- Glendenning (disambiguation)
