= Glendenning (disambiguation) =

Glendenning is a suburb of Sydney, in the state of New South Wales, Australia. Glendenning or Glendening is also a surname, of Scottish Gaelic origin.

Glendenning may also refer to:

== People with the surname ==
=== Glendening ===
- Frances Hughes Glendening, former First Lady of Maryland
- Luke Glendening, American ice hockey player
- Parris Glendening, American politician, Governor of Maryland
- Sarah Glendening, American actress

=== Glendenning ===
- Barry Glendenning, Irish sports journalist
- Bob Glendenning, English footballer
- Candace Glendenning, English actress
- John M. Glendenning, Canadian politician
- Lionel Glendenning (born 1941), Australian architect
- Maurice L. Glendenning, founder of the House of Aaron religious sect
- Phil Glendenning, Australian refugee advocate, life member of the Refugee Council of Australia
- Raymond Glendenning, BBC radio sports commentator

== Other uses ==
- Kidwell, West Virginia, formerly also known as Glendenning

== See also ==
- Glendinning, a surname
- David Glendenning Cogan, American ophthalmologist (given name)
- Kill Johnny Glendenning, a play
