= Powerhouse Museum =

Technology museum in Sydney, Australia

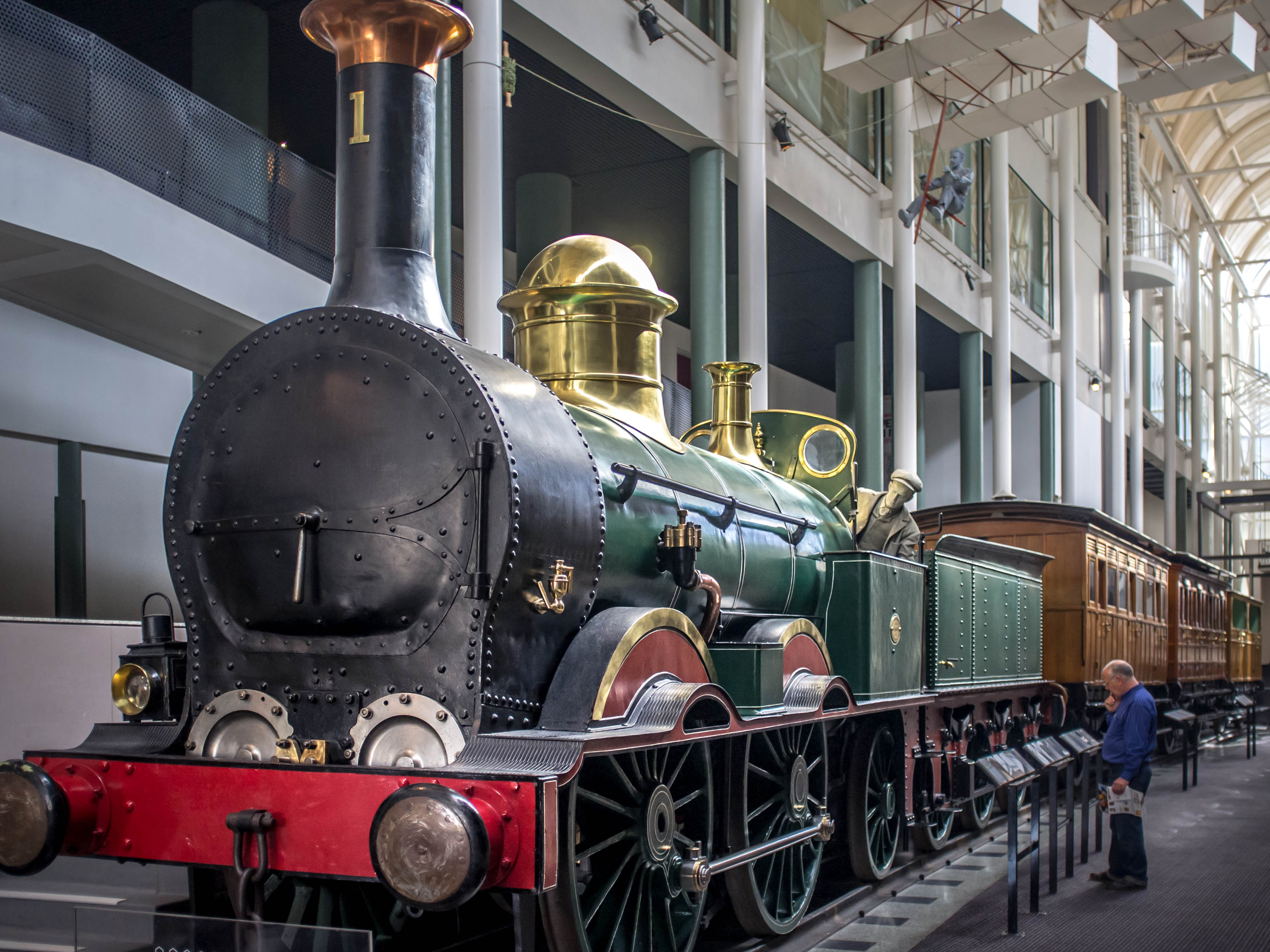
- Locomotive No. 1 in Powerhouse Turbine Hall

- Ultimo museum
- Former name: Technological, Industrial and Sanitary Museum of New South Wales (1879–1882); Technological Museum (until August 1893 – March 1988)
- Established: 1879
- Location: 4 locations in Greater Sydney, New South Wales, Australia: 34/47 Phillip Street, Parramatta; 500 Harris Street, Ultimo; Observatory Park, Sydney; Castle Hill, New South Wales
- Coordinates: 33.877898°S 151.199573°E
- Type: Technology museum
- Visitors: 757,166 (2018–19)
- CEO: Abbie Galvin (interim)
- Owner: New South Wales Government
- Website: powerhouse.com.au

The Powerhouse Museum, also known as the Museum of Applied Arts & Sciences (MAAS), is a collection of four museums in Sydney, owned by the Government of New South Wales. It is a contemporary museum of applied arts and sciences, exploring the intersections of design, innovation, science, and technology. Founded in 1879 as part of the Sydney International Exhibition, the institution is one of Australia's oldest continuously operating museums.

The Powerhouse Museum operates across four sites in Sydney: Powerhouse Parramatta, Powerhouse Ultimo, Powerhouse Castle Hill and Sydney Observatory.

Powerhouse Ultimo, the museum's home since 1988, is currently closed for major revitalisation. Powerhouse Parramatta, which opened in 2026, is the largest museum in the state of New South Wales. Powerhouse Castle Hill serves as the principal collection store and research centre, while Sydney Observatory continues to offer astronomy programs from its heritage-listed site at Observatory Hill.

Although often described as a science museum, Powerhouse holds one of Australia's most significant and diverse museum collections, spanning over 500,000 objects across design, applied arts, science, and technology. Key areas include including decorative arts, science, communication, transport, costume, furniture, media, computer technology, space technology and steam engines.

Its collection and public presence have evolved across several key sites over time—from the Garden Palace in the Botanic Gardens, to the Agricultural Hall in the Domain, Technological, Industrial and Sanitary Museum of New South Wales (1880–1889), the Technological Museum (August 1893 – March 1988) on Harris Street, and eventually into the Powerhouse Ultimo, housed in the former Ultimo Power Station from 1988.

Much of the collection is stored and researched at Powerhouse Castle Hill, a publicly accessible facility open on weekends. Since 2019, Powerhouse has undertaken one of the largest museum digitisation projects in the world, making its vast collection more accessible through millions of high-resolution object photographs available online. This effort is extended through projects like Sounding the Collection, which captures the unique sounds of selected objects, offering new sensory ways to experience the collection.

== Powerhouse Ultimo ==
Powerhouse Ultimo, housed in a repurposed 1902 electric tram power station, has served as the museum's primary venue since its opening in 1988. In recent years, Powerhouse Ultimo has consistently ranked among the most visited museums in Oceania.

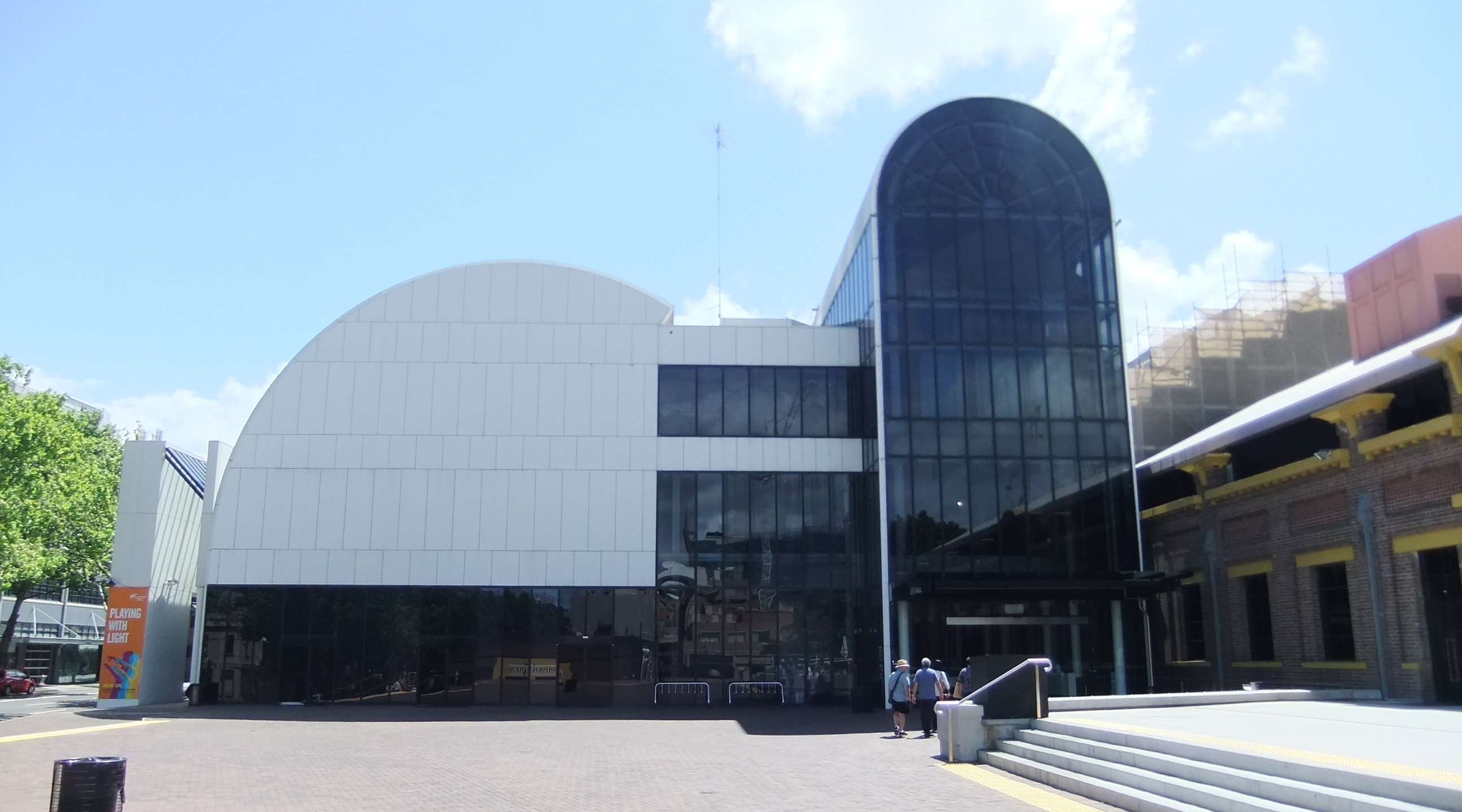
Exterior view of Powerhouse Ultimo, Sydney (October 2013)

Powerhouse Ultimo building, designed by Lionel Glendenning for the Australian Bicentenary in 1988, won the Sir John Sulman Medal for architecture. It includes a specially installed reticulated steam system, run from the old boiler house, to drive the large, rare steam machines in its collection. The statement of significance for the Federation building says the Powerhouse played a "major part in the 20th-century development of the Ultimo/Pyrmont area and in the wider heritage conservation movement in NSW." and it was part of the Darling Harbour Bicentennial citywide adaptation project, incorporated into "the transition of a major industrial location to a cultural, educational and tourism precinct".

As of February 2024, the site is temporarily closed for a major heritage revitalisation project, with completion anticipated in 2027. The $300 million redevelopment aims to enhance exhibition spaces, improve visitor accessibility, and preserve the site's historical architecture. Key features include a new public square, a reoriented main entrance facing The Goods Line, and upgraded facilities to support expanded programming and international exhibitions.

== Powerhouse Parramatta ==
Powerhouse Parramatta, situated on the banks of the Parramatta River, is the largest museum in New South Wales. The facility features over 18,000 square meters of exhibition and public space, including a 600-seat theatre, rooftop garden with telescopes, demonstration kitchen, and seven column-free exhibition spaces. Designed by Moreau Kusunoki and Genton, the project represents the most significant cultural infrastructure investment in NSW since the Sydney Opera House.

The museum opened on 7 November 2026.

== Powerhouse Castle Hill ==
Powerhouse Castle Hill, formerly known as the Museums Discovery Centre, serves as the principal collection storage and research facility for the Powerhouse Museum. Housing over 500,000 objects, it plays a pivotal role in the preservation and accessibility of the museum's extensive collection. The site operates in partnership with the Australian Museum and Museums of History New South Wales, reflecting a collaborative approach to shared storage, research, and public engagement.

The facility includes seven buildings dedicated to storage, conservation, and display, accommodating a diverse range of objects, from Eddie Mabo's shirt to Locomotive No. 1. Open to the public on weekends, Powerhouse Castle Hill offers behind-the-scenes access to one of Australia's most comprehensive museum collections, showcasing objects not currently on display at other Powerhouse sites. The site also supports the museum's specialist practices—including conservation, digitisation, logistics, registration, and research—highlighting the complex work of collection care and access. From late 2004, 60 percent of the collection was moved to a new 3 hectares (7.4 acres) site in the northwestern Sydney suburb of Castle Hill. Built at a cost of A$12 million, this facility consists of seven huge sheds, including one the size of an aircraft hangar, within which are housed artefacts as a section of the mast of HMS Victory, Nelson's flagship at the Battle of Trafalgar, and the spare wheel from Bluebird-Proteus CN7, the car Donald Campbell drove to break the world land speed record on Lake Eyre in the 1960s.

Powerhouse Castle Hill underwent a major $44 million expansion between 2018 and 2023, designed by Lahznimmo Architects. The 9,000 m² addition increased storage by 30% and introduced new facilities for conservation, digitisation, research, and public programs. A standout feature is the "visible store" – a glazed façade offering views into the Very Large Object store, which houses planes, trains, and industrial machinery.

The project received the 2024 Sir Zelman Cowen Award for Public Architecture and was also shortlisted for a 2024 Dezeen Awards, recognising its integration of public access, preservation, and design excellence.

== Sydney Observatory ==
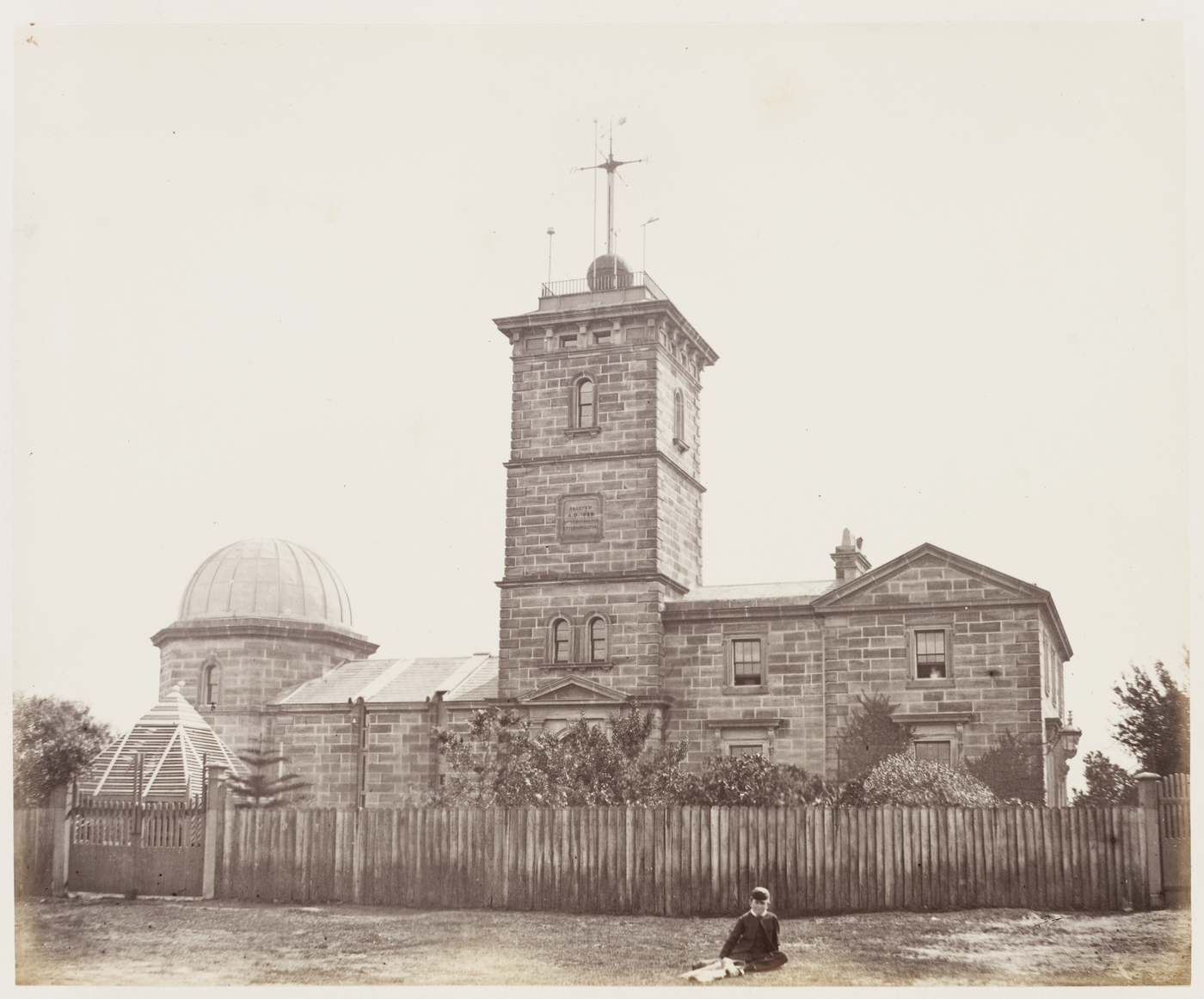
Exterior of Sydney Observatory, 1872, Charles Pickering, from original albumen print, State Library of New South Wales,

Since 1982, Sydney Observatory has operated under the stewardship of the Powerhouse Museum, transitioning into a museum and public observatory.

Located atop Observatory Hill in Millers Point, is a heritage-listed site and an integral part of the Powerhouse Museum. Established in 1858, it has been a cornerstone of Australia's scientific history, originally serving as a timekeeping and astronomical research facility. The Observatory was instrumental in navigation, meteorology, and the study of the southern skies.

== History ==
The Powerhouse Museum has its origins in a recommendation of the trustees of the Australian Museum in 1878 and the Sydney International Exhibition of 1879 and Melbourne International Exhibition of 1880. The Sydney International Exhibition was held in the Garden Palace, a purpose-built exhibition building located in the grounds of the Royal Botanic Gardens. At the conclusion of the exhibition, the Australian Museum (Sydney's museum of natural history) appointed a committee to select the best exhibits with the intention of exhibiting them permanently in a new museum to be sited within the Garden Palace. The new museum was to be called The Technological, Industrial, and Sanitary Museum of New South Wales; its purpose was to exhibit the latest industrial, construction and design innovations with the intention of showing how improvements in the living standards and health of the population might be brought about.

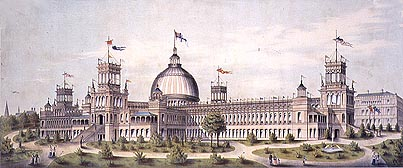
Illustration of the Garden Palace built for the Sydney International Exhibition,1879.

In September 1882, before the new museum could be opened a fire completely destroyed the Garden Palace, leaving the museum's first curator, Joseph Henry Maiden with a collection consisting of only the most durable artefacts including a Ceylonese statue of an elephant carved in graphite that had miraculously survived the blaze despite a 5-storey plunge.

Maiden commenced rebuilding the collection, but for the subsequent decade the new museum found itself housed in a large tin shed in The Domain, a facility it shared with the Sydney Hospital morgue. The ever-present stench of decaying corpses was not the best advertisement for an institution dedicated to the promotion of sanitation. Eventually, after lobbying, the museum was relocated to a three-storey building; a temporary home at the Agricultural Hall in the Domain, a new, purpose-built premises in Harris Street, Ultimo and was given a new name: the "Technological Museum".

The new location placed the museum adjacent to the Sydney Technical College, and as such it was intended to provide material inspiration to the students. As time passed, its name was changed to The Museum of Applied Arts and Sciences and it also established branches in some of New South Wales' main industrial and mining centres, including Broken Hill, Albury, Newcastle and Maitland. It also quickly outgrew the main Harris Street site and by 1978 the situation had become dire, with many exhibits literally stuffed into its attic, and left unexhibited for decades.

On 23 August 1978, Premier Neville Wran announced that the decrepit Ultimo Power Station, several hundred metres north of the Harris Street site had been earmarked as the museum's new permanent home along with the adjoining former Ultimo Tram Depot. The museum spent an interim period exhibiting as the Powerhouse Museum – Stage One in the nearby tram sheds before re-opening as the Powerhouse Museum at the new site on 10 March 1988. The main museum building contains five levels, three courtyards and a cafeteria, as well as some offices. Workshops, library, storage and additional office space is located in the annexed tram sheds.

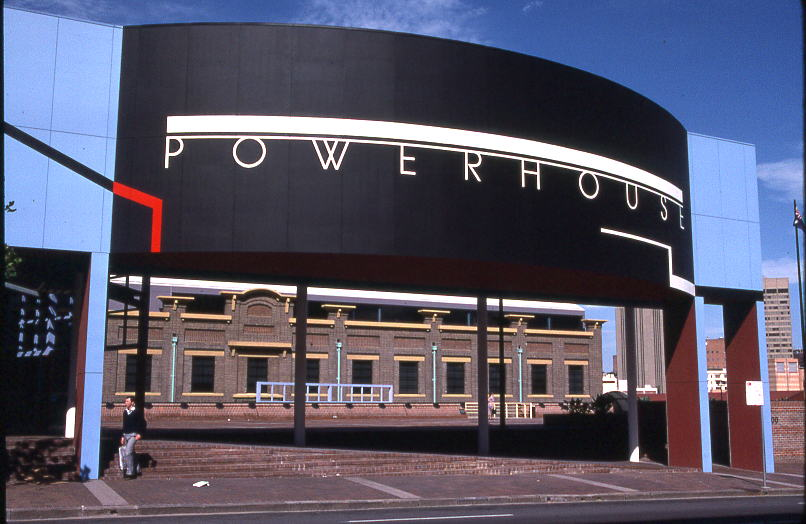
Exterior of Powerhouse Ultimo,1988

The Powerhouse Ultimo made it possible to rehabilitate hundreds of treasures stored at Alexandria and "exhibit them for the first time in almost a century". In 1982, the museum incorporated the Sydney Observatory. The museum moved to 500 Harris Street in March 1988, and took its new name from the new location.

Following its closure as a working observatory in 1982, Sydney Observatory was incorporated into the Museum of Applied Arts and Sciences, as the museum was still formally known, though from 1988 this name was no longer used in marketing materials in favour of the Powerhouse Museum brand.

== Powerhouse Ultimo Upgrade ==
In 2015, the NSW Government announced plans to relocate the Powerhouse Museum to Parramatta, initially proposing the closure of the Ultimo site. Following public consultation and review, the government confirmed in 2017 that Ultimo would remain open. In 2018, the development of a new museum in Parramatta was confirmed, with a final design unveiled in 2019.

The new site was planned as a 30,000 m² facility with 18,000 m² of public space, designed to house large objects.

The project generated public debate, with criticism from museum professionals, heritage experts, and community groups. Issues included the demolition of Willow Grove, floodplain risks at the Parramatta site, and the adequacy of new facilities.

In response to sustained public and sector advocacy, the decision to close Ultimo was reversed in 2020.

The outcome established a dual-site model—retaining and upgrading Ultimo, while building a landmark museum in Parramatta—positioning the Powerhouse as a major cultural institution with expanded reach across Greater Sydney.

In December 2023, Arts Minister John Graham announced that the Ultimo site would be closed from early February for up to three years, to allow for significant upgrades and redevelopment. A new public square is planned, and the entrance will be moved so that it faces The Goods Line walkway from Central Station.

On 5 February 2024, Powerhouse Ultimo began a period of temporary closure until 2027 for major redevelopment.

== Construction of Powerhouse Parramatta ==
In July 2020, the NSW Government confirmed that the Powerhouse Museum would retain its Ultimo location while also proceeding with the development of the museum in Parramatta. This dual-site approach aimed to expand cultural access across Greater Sydney, drawing comparisons to multi-site institutions like the Smithsonian.

Construction of Powerhouse Parramatta commenced in 2022, following the completion of design development and planning phases in 2020 and 2021. Lendlease was appointed as the main construction partner for this significant cultural infrastructure project. Since then, the project has achieved several major milestones:

- Exoskeleton Installation: The museum's distinctive steel exoskeleton, comprising over 1,300 individual pieces, was installed, enabling expansive, column-free exhibition spaces.
- First use of renewable diesel in Australian construction: Powerhouse Parramatta became one of the first major construction projects in Australia to use cranes powered entirely by 100% renewable diesel (HVO100).
- Topping Out: In May 2025, the structure reached its full height of 75 metres, marking the completion of the building's highest point.

The museum will feature over 18,000 square metres of exhibition and public space, including seven expansive, column-free galleries, a 600-seat theatre, rooftop gardens, and dedicated learning studios. The building's innovative exoskeleton design has reached its full 75-metre height, with major construction milestones such as the completion of exhibition spaces and installation of link bridges already achieved.

Addressing concerns about the site's proximity to the Parramatta River, the museum incorporates flood mitigation strategies. The building's ground floor is elevated to remain above a 1-in-1000-year flood level, and an undercroft space allows floodwaters to pass through without impacting the main structure.

A cornerstone of the new museum is the Lang Walker Family Academy, established through a $20 million donation from the Walker Family Foundation. This academy will provide immersive STEM education experiences for over 10,000 high school students annually, including overnight stays in a 60-bed accommodation facility. Programs commenced in 2022, offering in-school STEM education across various Western Sydney local government areas.

Powerhouse Parramatta will be the largest museum in New South Wales and the first major cultural institution in Western Sydney, where nearly 10% of Australia's population lives. Recognised as one of the most significant structural engineering and architecturally complex projects underway in the world, Powerhouse Parramatta opened on 7 November 2026.

== People ==
In January 2019, Lisa Havilah, former director of Carriageworks, took up the position of CEO of Powerhouse. She became the fourth head of MAAS in five and a half years.

Havilah stepped aside from her role amid a government investigation into "governance and procurement practices". Havilah was replaced by NSW Government Architect Abbie Galvin as interim CEO, with former Sydney Opera House CEO Louise Herron being appointed strategic adviser.

== Exhibits ==
The museums have hosted a number of permanent exhibitions, including many concerning different modes of transport and communication.

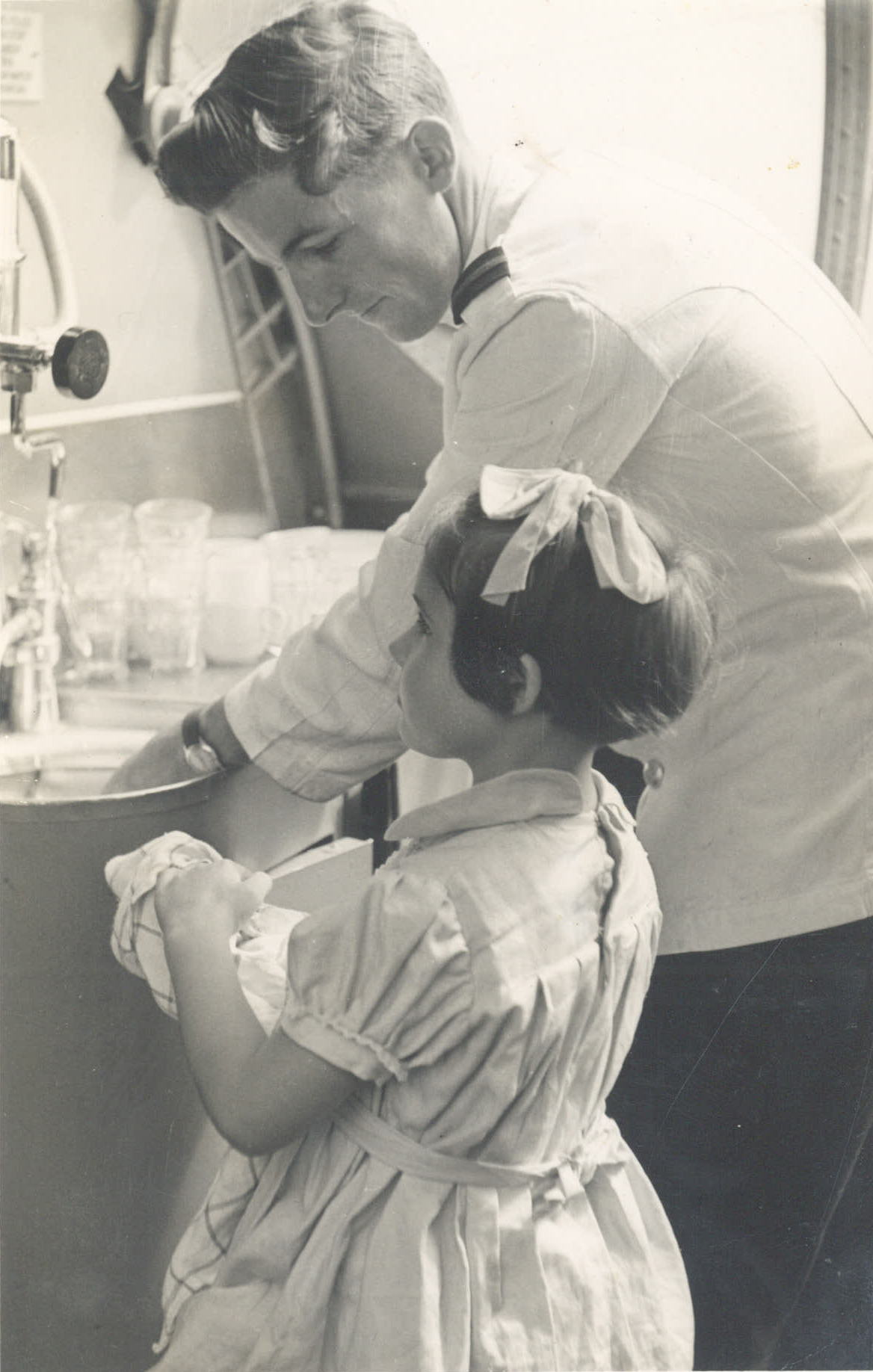
Inside a commercial QANTAS Catalina aircraft of the type on display in the Powerhouse, en route from Suva to Sydney in January 1949

=== Key attractions ===
The Powerhouse Museum houses a number of unique exhibits including the oldest operational rotative steam engine in the world, the Whitbread Engine. Dating from 1785, it is one of only a handful remaining that was built by Boulton and Watt and was acquired from Whitbread's London Brewery in 1888. This engine was named a Historic Mechanical Engineering Landmark by the American Society of Mechanical Engineers in 1986.

Another important exhibit is Locomotive No. 1, the first steam locomotive to haul a passenger train in New South Wales, built by Robert Stephenson & Company in 1854. The most popular exhibit is arguably "The Strasburg Clock Model", built in 1887 by a 25-year-old Sydney watchmaker named Richard Smith. It is a working model of the famous Strasbourg astronomical clock in Strasbourg Cathedral (which at that time was called Strassburg or Strasburg). Smith had never actually seen the original when he built it but worked from a pamphlet which described its timekeeping and astronomical functions.

The Catalina Flying Boat Frigate Bird II on display in the museum is the one that Sir Patrick Gordon Taylor flew on the first flight from Australia to South America, in which he brought home 29 soldiers from New Guinea in 1945. It is the largest suspended plane in any museum in the world, and an example of the most successful flying boat ever introduced and one that was important in connecting Australia by air with the rest of the world after World War II. After involvement in the air-sea rescue squadron, the museum's specimen flew from the Rose Bay flying boat base across the Pacific Ocean on the first uncharted air route between Sydney and Valparaiso, Chile. The use of Catalina flying boats by Qantas Empire Airways after World War II was significant in the development of Australia's commercial air services.

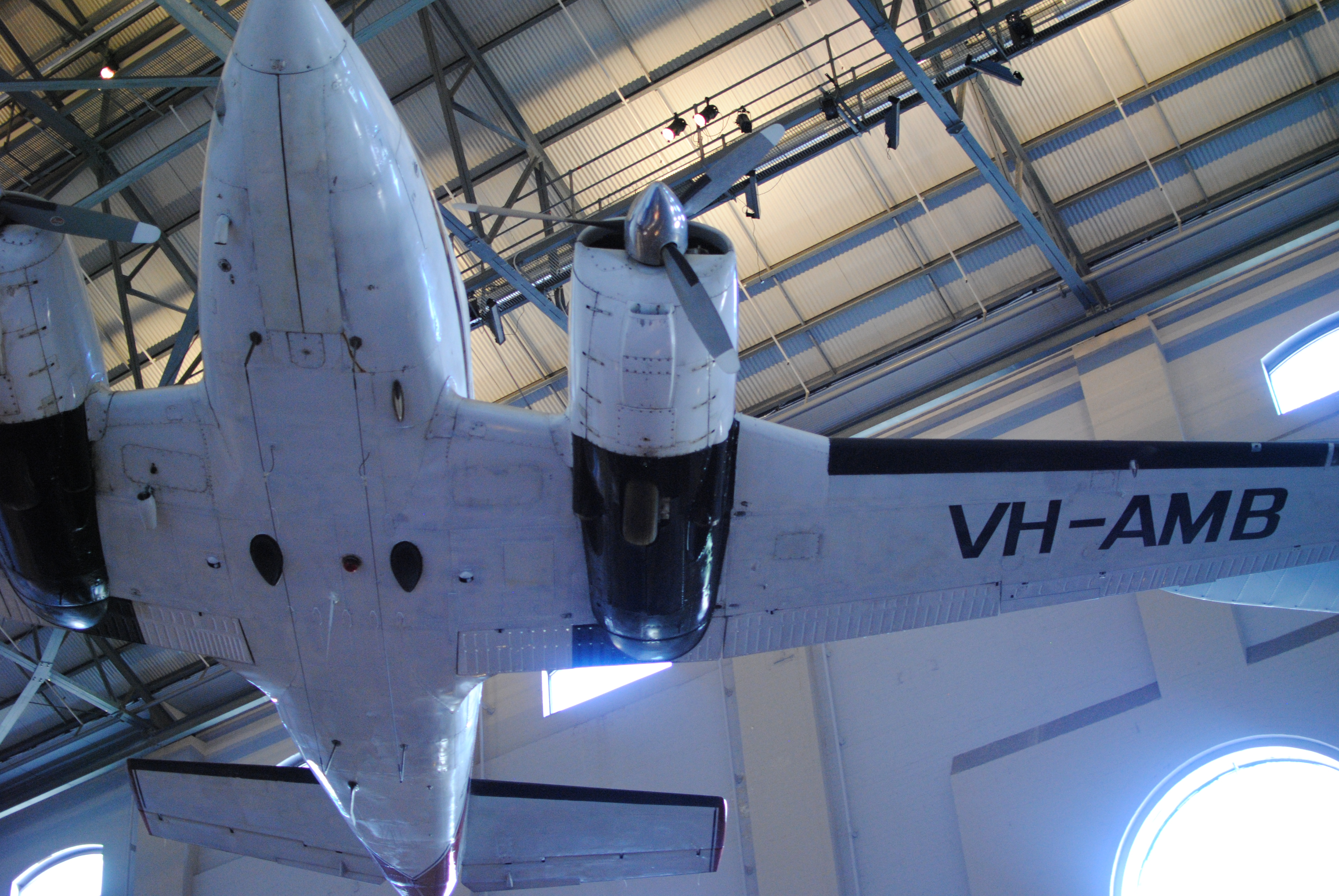
1967 Beechcraft Queenair B80 air ambulance, VH-AMB

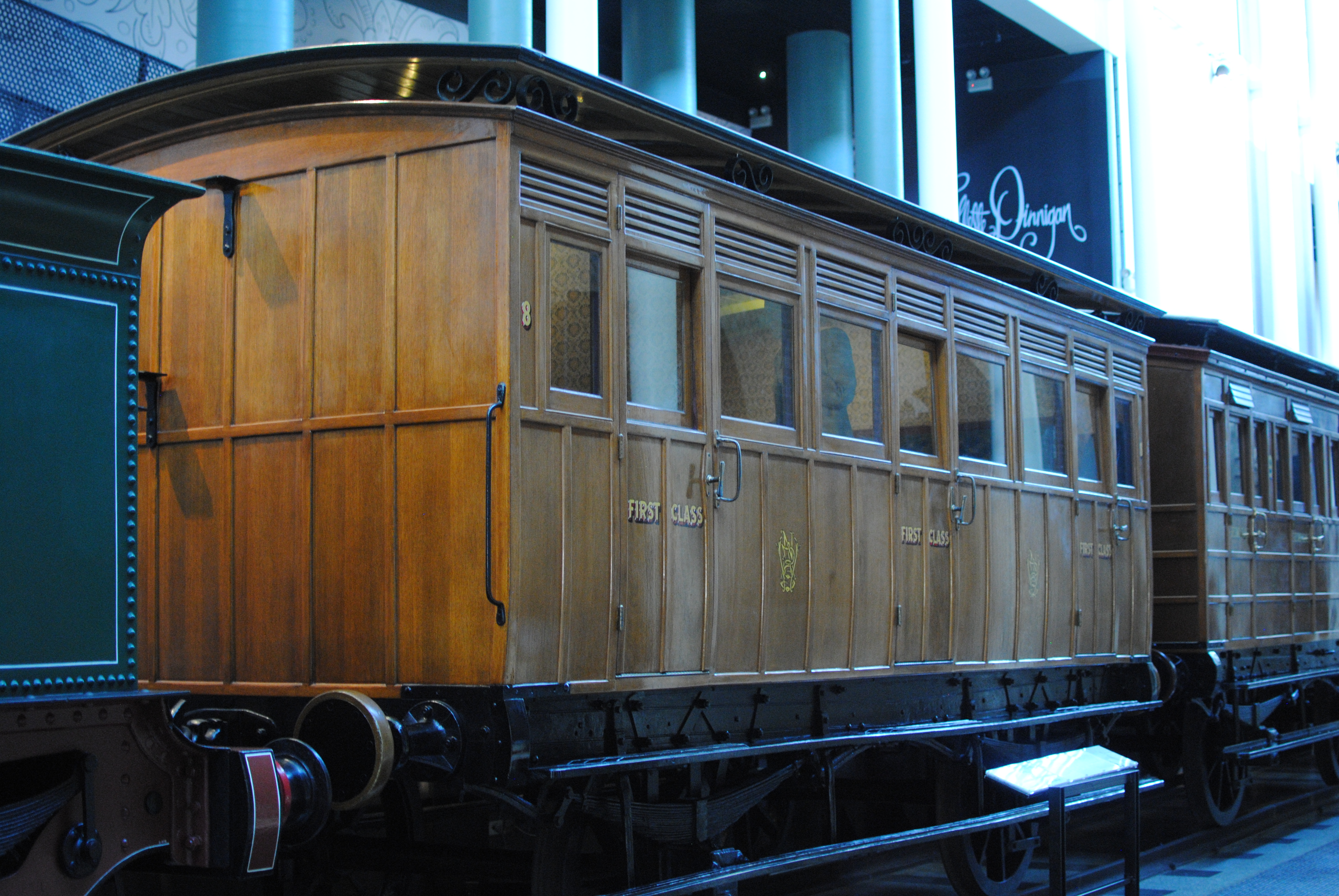
First class carriage, built by Joseph Wright and Sons, of Saltley, Birmingham, England in 1854 and used on the Sydney to Parramatta line from its 1855 opening

=== Transport ===
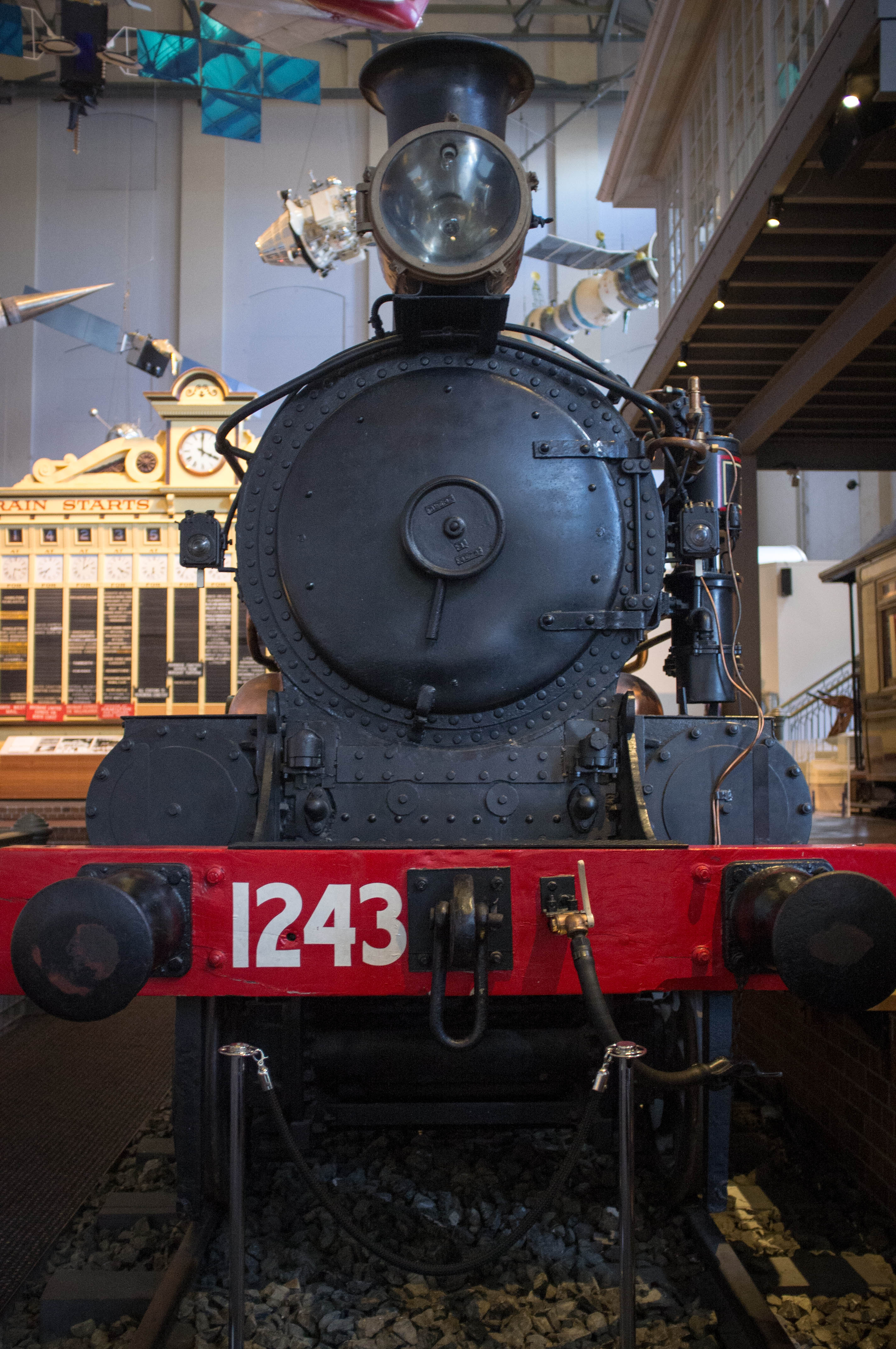
Locomotive 1243 in Transport Hall

The transport exhibition looks at transport through the ages, from horse-drawn carts through steam engines, cars and planes to the latest hybrid technology. On display is Steam Locomotive No. 1243, which served for 87 years, oldest contractor built locomotive in Australia. It stands beside a mock-up of a railway platform, on the other side of which is the Governor of New South Wales's railway carriage, of the 1880s. Also in this exhibition is the original Central railway station destination board, relocated to the museum in the 1980s when the station was refurbished.

Powerhouse Museum restored the locomotives 3830, restored to operational order in 1997 and 3265, restored in 2009 after 40 years off the rails. Sydney's last Hansom Cab was donated to the museum by its driver, who left it at the gates of the Harris Street building. There is also a horse-drawn bus and collection of motorbikes. Suspended aeroplanes, which can be viewed from balconies, include the Catalina flying boat and a Queenair Scout, the first Flying Doctor Service plane. Among the cars is a 1913 Sheffield Simplex, one of only 8 in the world. A four-minute film shows old footage of public transport.

The Powerhouse Museum also has Sydney trams C11 (1898), O805 (1909), R1738 (1938. 1st of its type), steam tram motor 28A, hearse car 27s and Manly horse car 292.

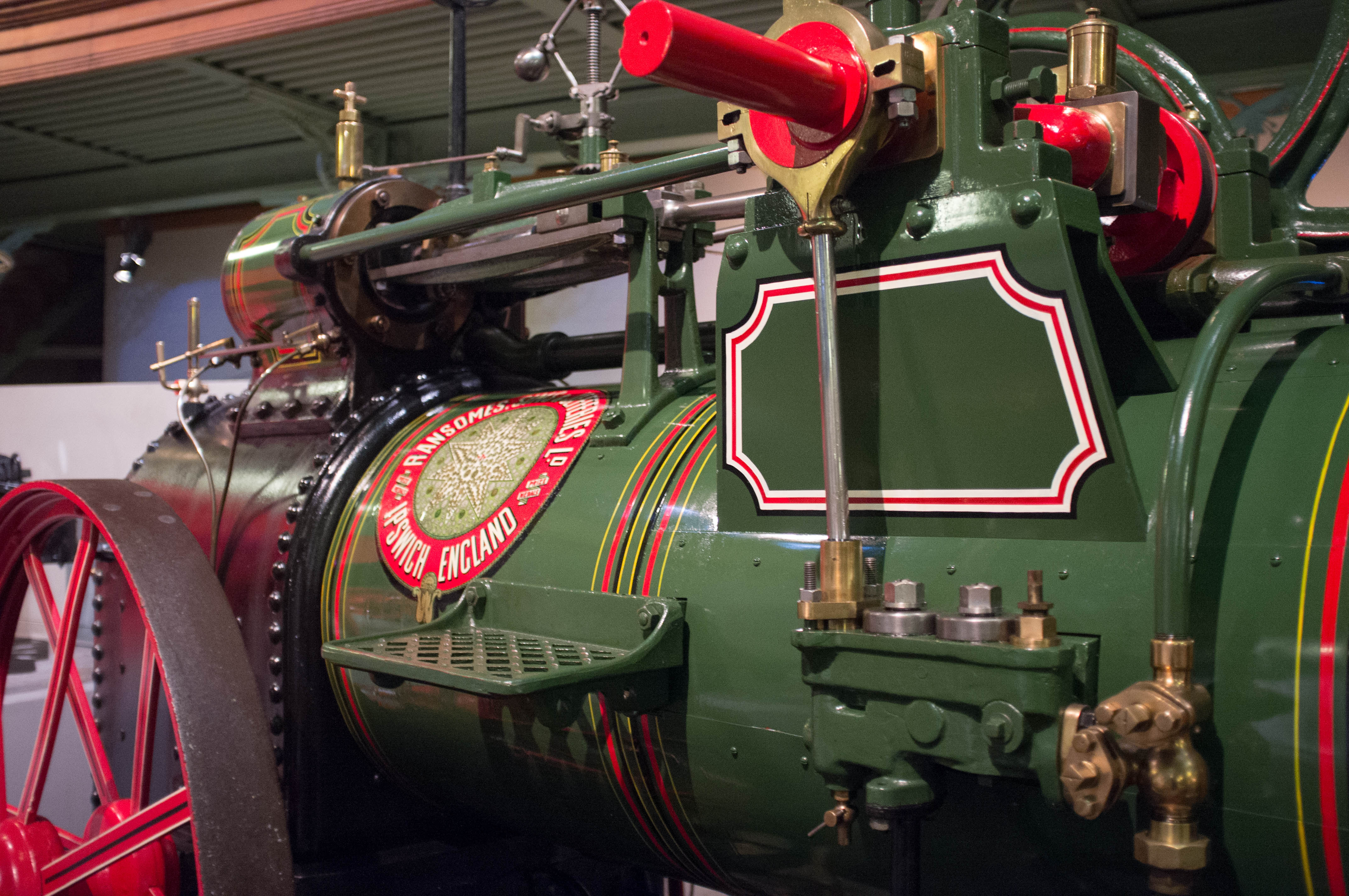
Agricultural steam engine in Steam Revolution Exhibition

=== The steam revolution ===
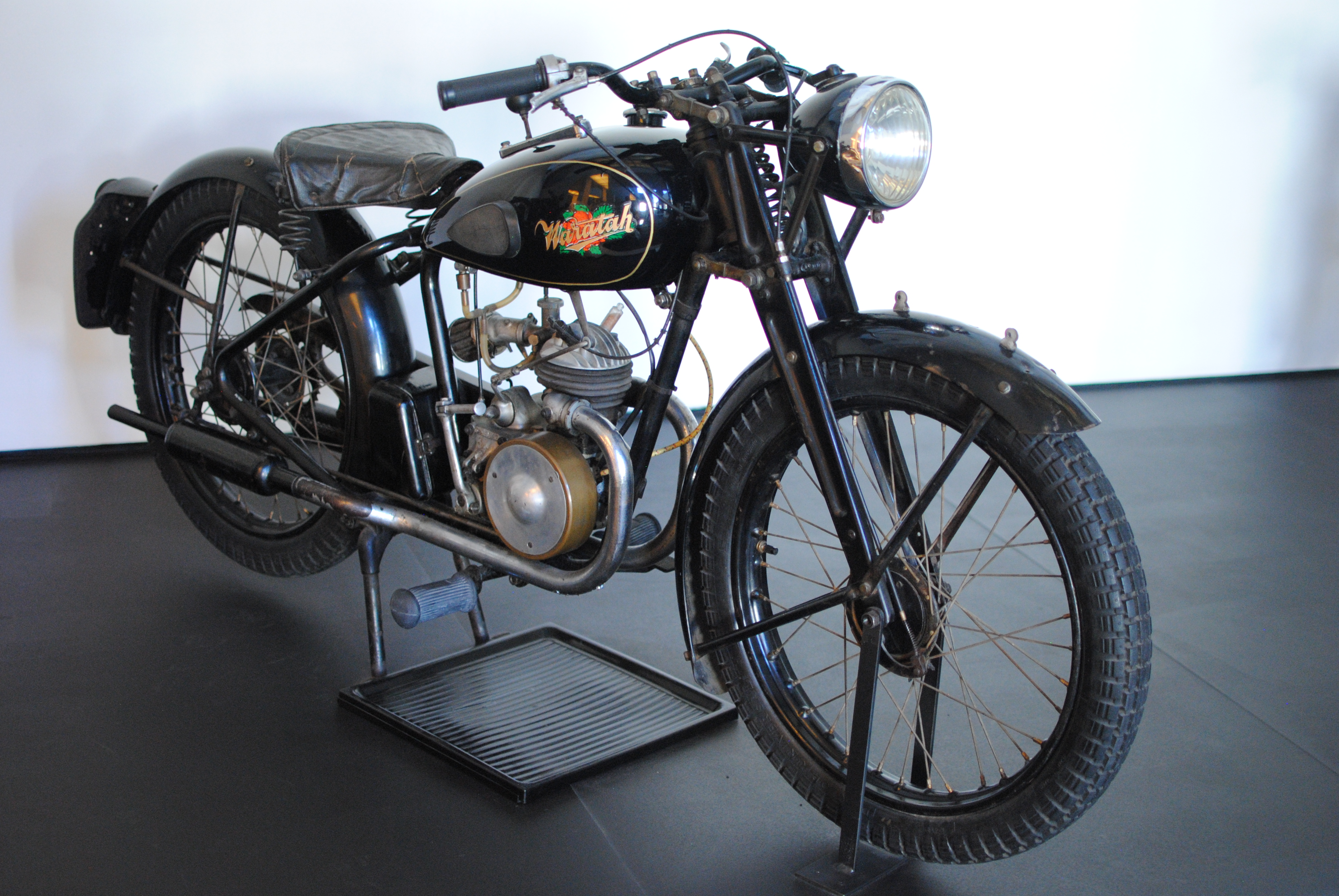
"Waratah" motorcycle

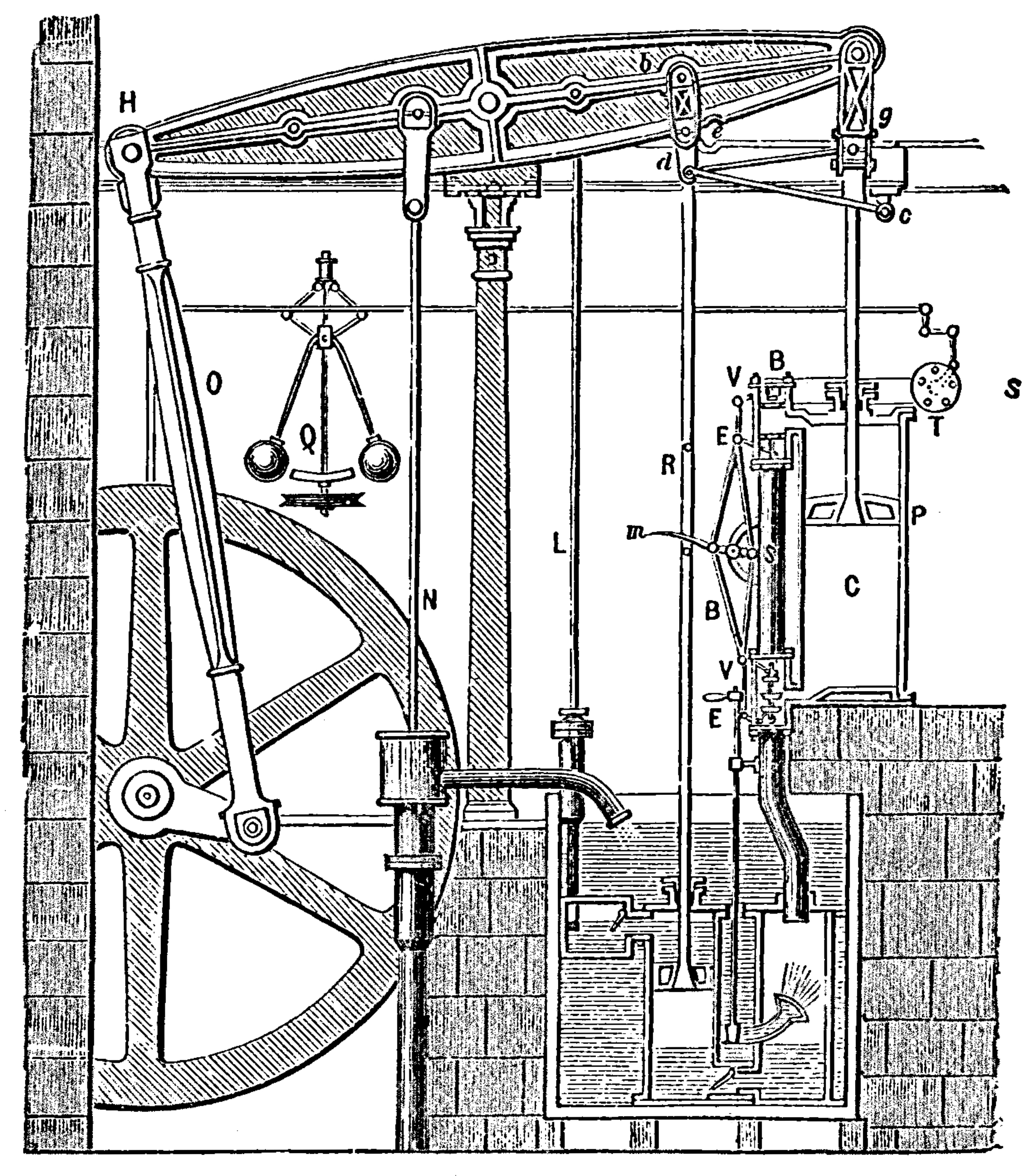
The Whitbread Engine steam engine designed by Boulton & Watt, England, 1784

This exhibition is remarkable in that nearly all of the engines on display are fully operational and are regularly demonstrated working on steam power. Together with the Boulton and Watt engine, and the museum's locomotives, steam truck and traction engines, they are a unique working collection tracing the development of steam power from the 1770s to the 1930s. Engines on display include an 1830s Maudslay engine, a Ransom and Jeffries agricultural engine and the Broken Hill Fire Brigade's horse-drawn pump-engine. The museum owns a collection of mechanical musical instruments, of which the fairground barrel organ is located in the steam exhibition, where it is powered by a small fairground engine.

=== Time and space ===
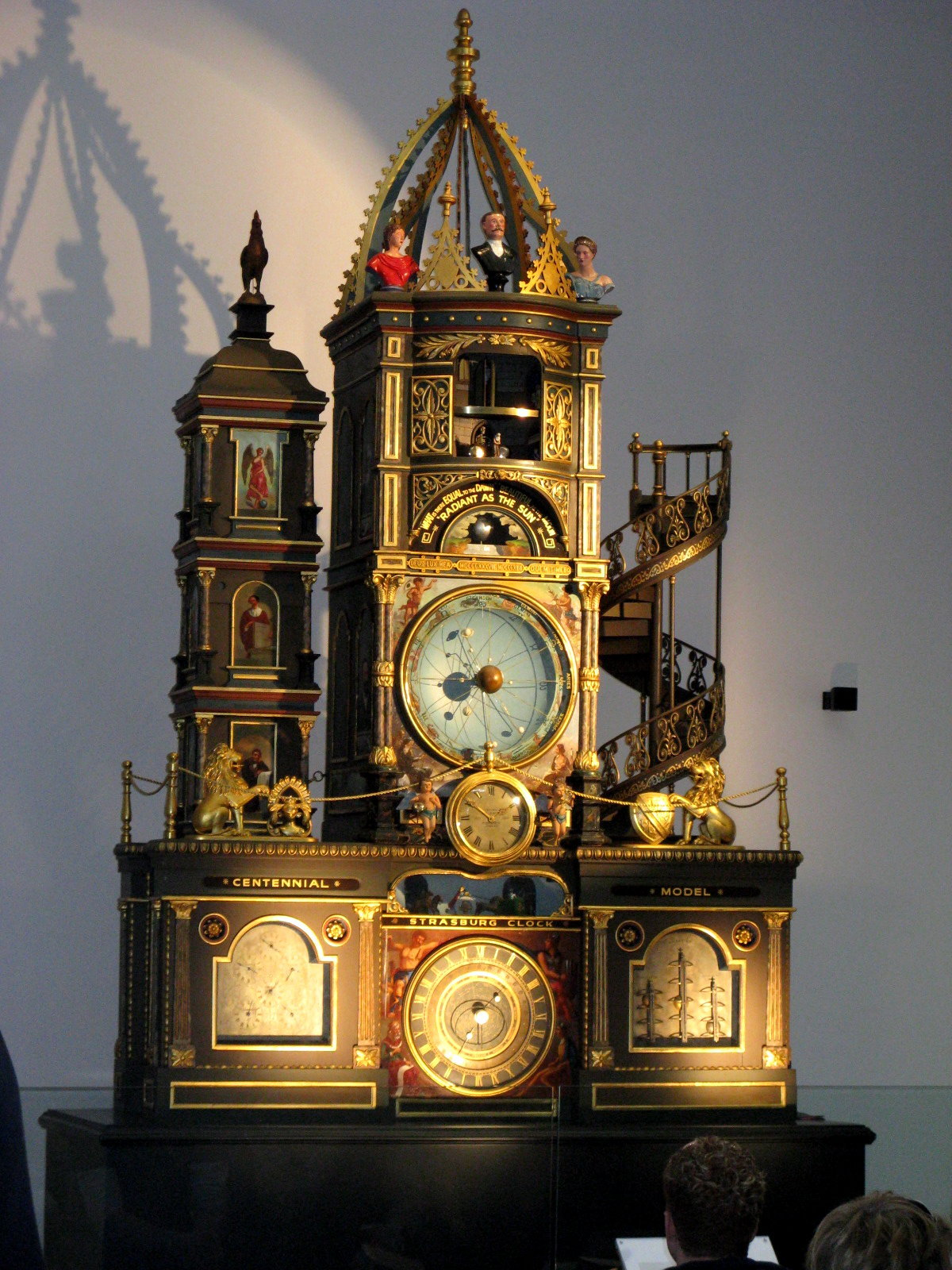
Strasbourg Astronomical Clock (model)

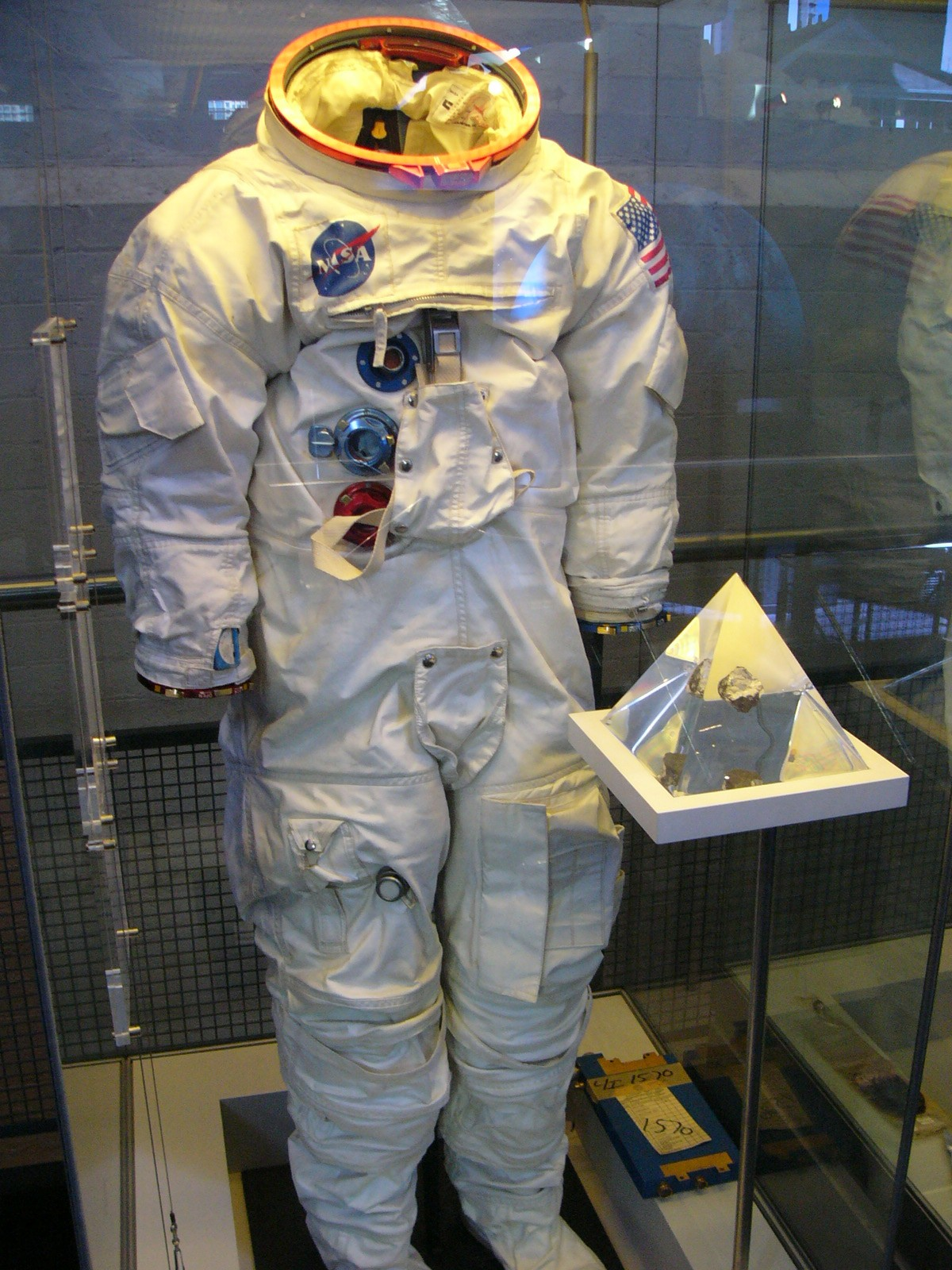
NASA space suit

The most popular exhibit is arguably the museum's model of the Strasbourg astronomical clock in Strasbourg Cathedral (which at that time was called Strassburg or Strasburg). The reproduction is a working model built between 1887 and 1889 by a 25-year-old Sydney watchmaker named Richard Bartholomew Smith, who had never actually seen the original when he built it but worked from a pamphlet which described its timekeeping and astronomical functions. The museum acquired it in 1890. Made from carved and painted wood with gold painted detailing, the clock displays the position of the planets, the days of the month, solar time, lunar phases and analog time.

The Space exhibition looks at space and discoveries relating to it. It includes a life size model space-shuttle cockpit. It has a feature on Australian satellites and joins the Transport exhibit through an underground temporary exhibit walkway and two side entrances.

The Powerhouse Museum has a 7 1/2-inch Merz Telescope that was manufactured in 1860–1861.

=== Environment ===
The EcoLogic exhibition focuses on the challenges facing the environment, human impact, and ways and technologies to stop this effect. There is a house setup called Ecohouse where people toggle light variables to see the outcome as well as other energy use simulators and a 'ecological footprint' game. The exhibition includes a section of a tree with a time line marked on its rings, dating back to the 17th century.

=== Computers and connections ===
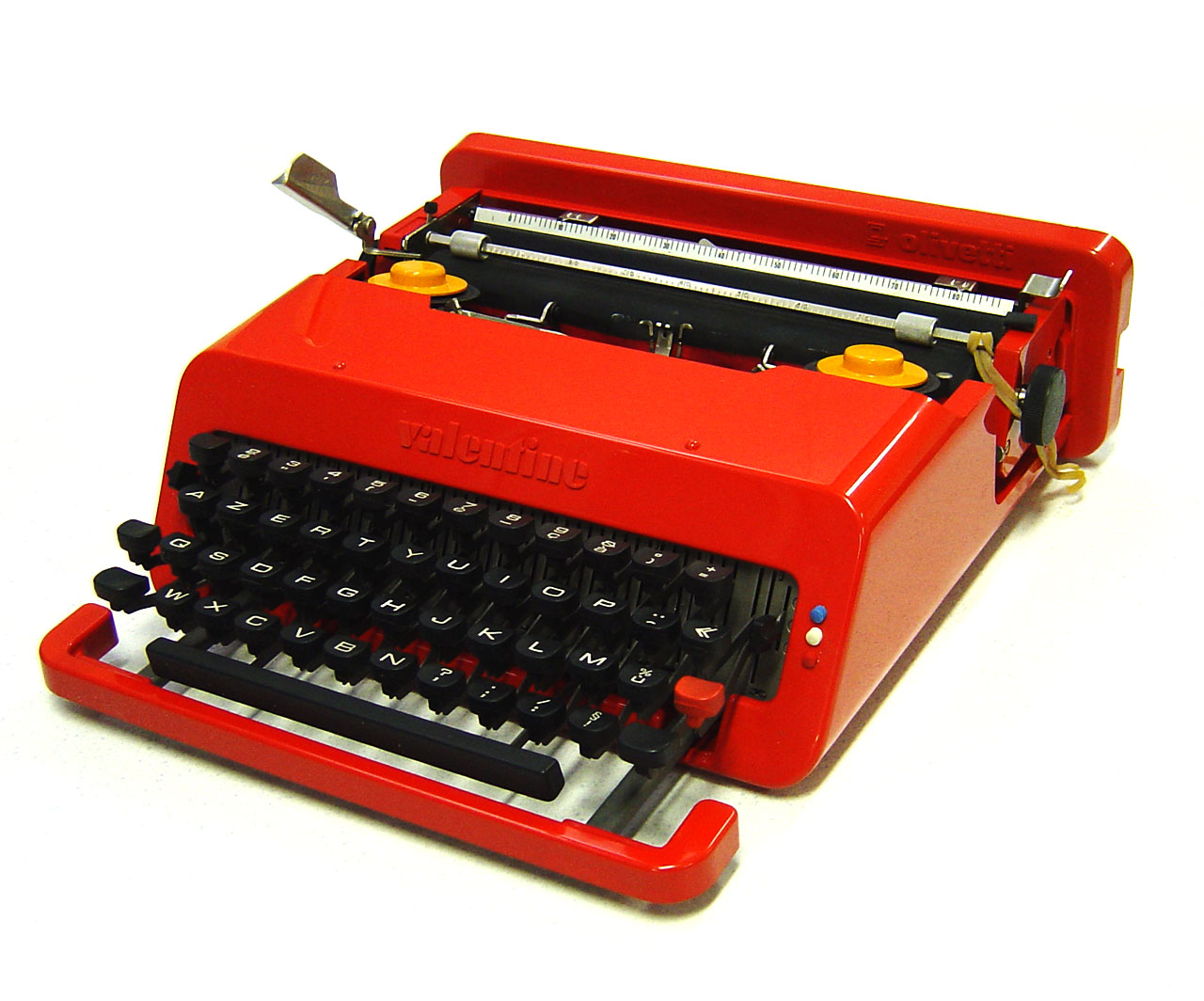
The 1969 Olivetti Valentine typewriter, featured in the permanent collections of the Powerhouse Museum, as well as the Metropolitan Museum of Art, Museum of Modern Art, and Cooper Hewitt, Smithsonian Design Museum in New York; and London's Design Museum and Victoria and Albert Museum

The 'Interface: people, machines, design' explores how humans have been impacted by technology. A gallery of computing technology from the typewriter to the Tamagotchi. It explores successful and not-so successful design approaches made in the computing technology world.

=== Experimentations ===
"Experimentations" is a science exhibition and contains interactive displays demonstrating aspects of magnetism, light, electricity, motion and the senses. These include a machine that explains how chocolate is made and lets one taste four 'stages' of chocolate. There is a full-sized model of the front of a firetruck that measures the pedal-power used to sound its horn and lights, and a hand-powered model railway using a magnetic system to provide electric current to the track. One of the most popular features is a plasma ball that shows the electric current through the glowing gas inside it, and changes when touched.

=== Art and industry ===
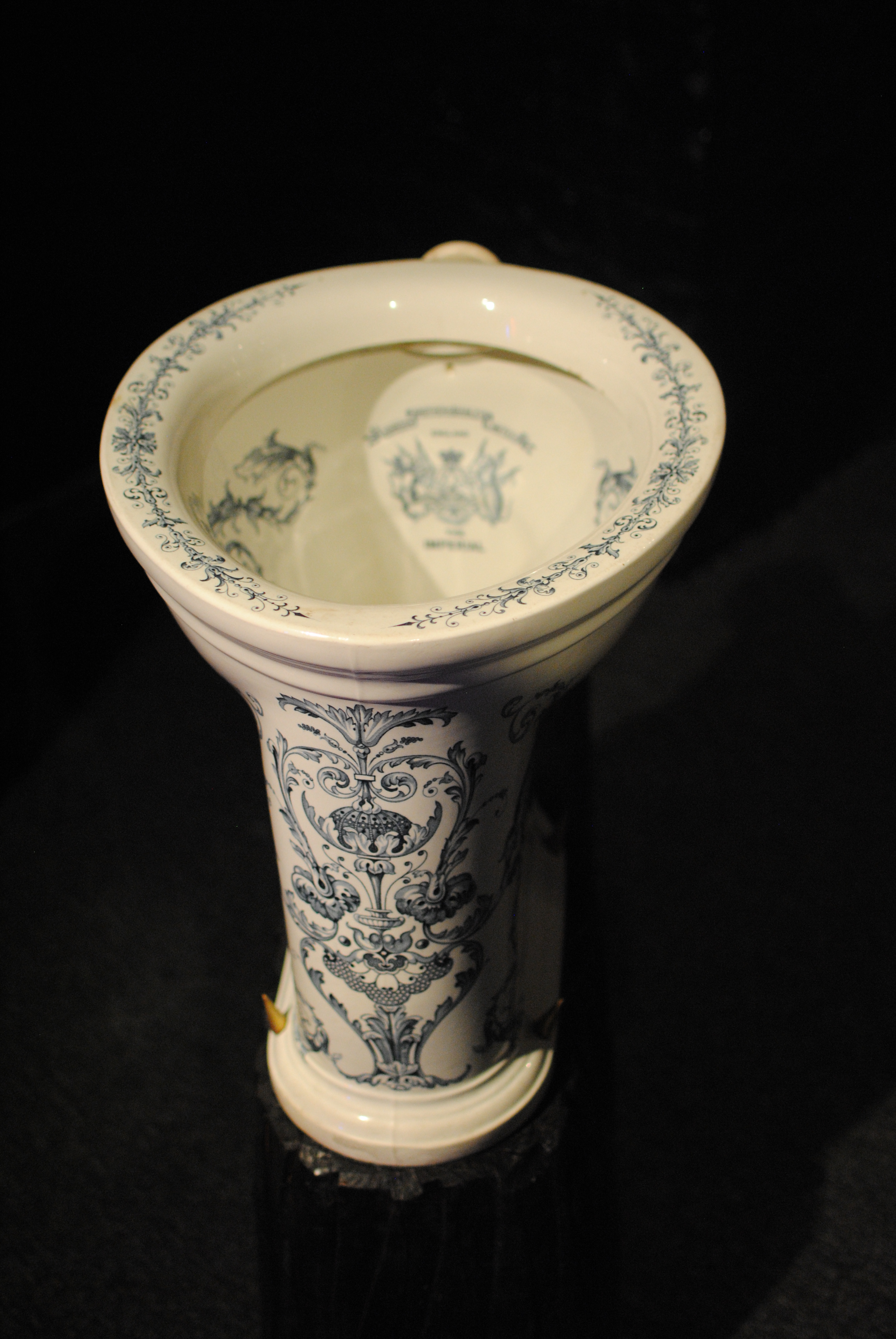
Decorated sanitary ware

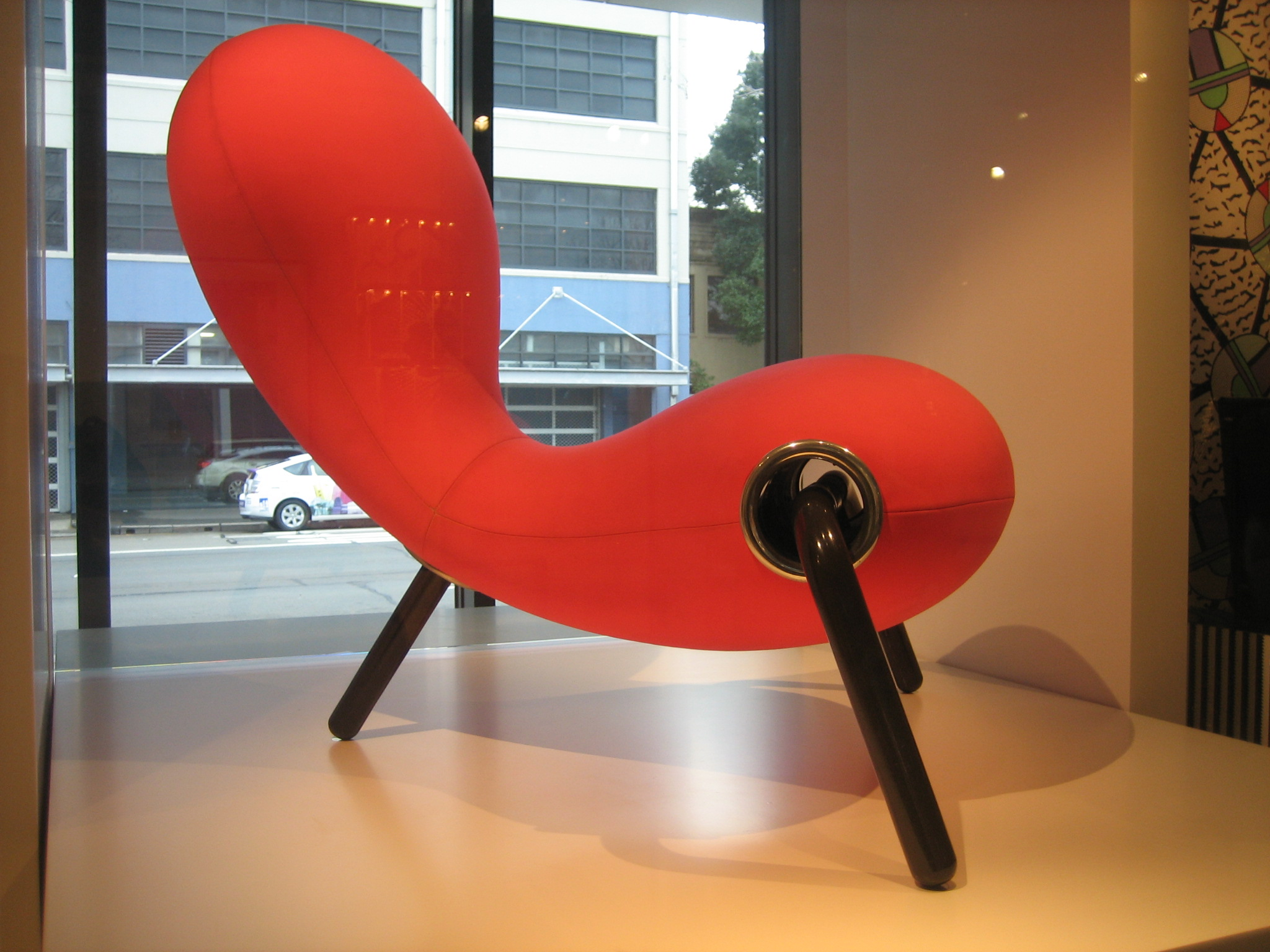
Embryo chair by Marc Newson (1988)

The museum holds an extensive and significant collection of Doulton ware and other ceramics, as well as industrial equipment and industrial design, such as furniture.

== Temporary exhibitions ==
=== Australian popular culture ===
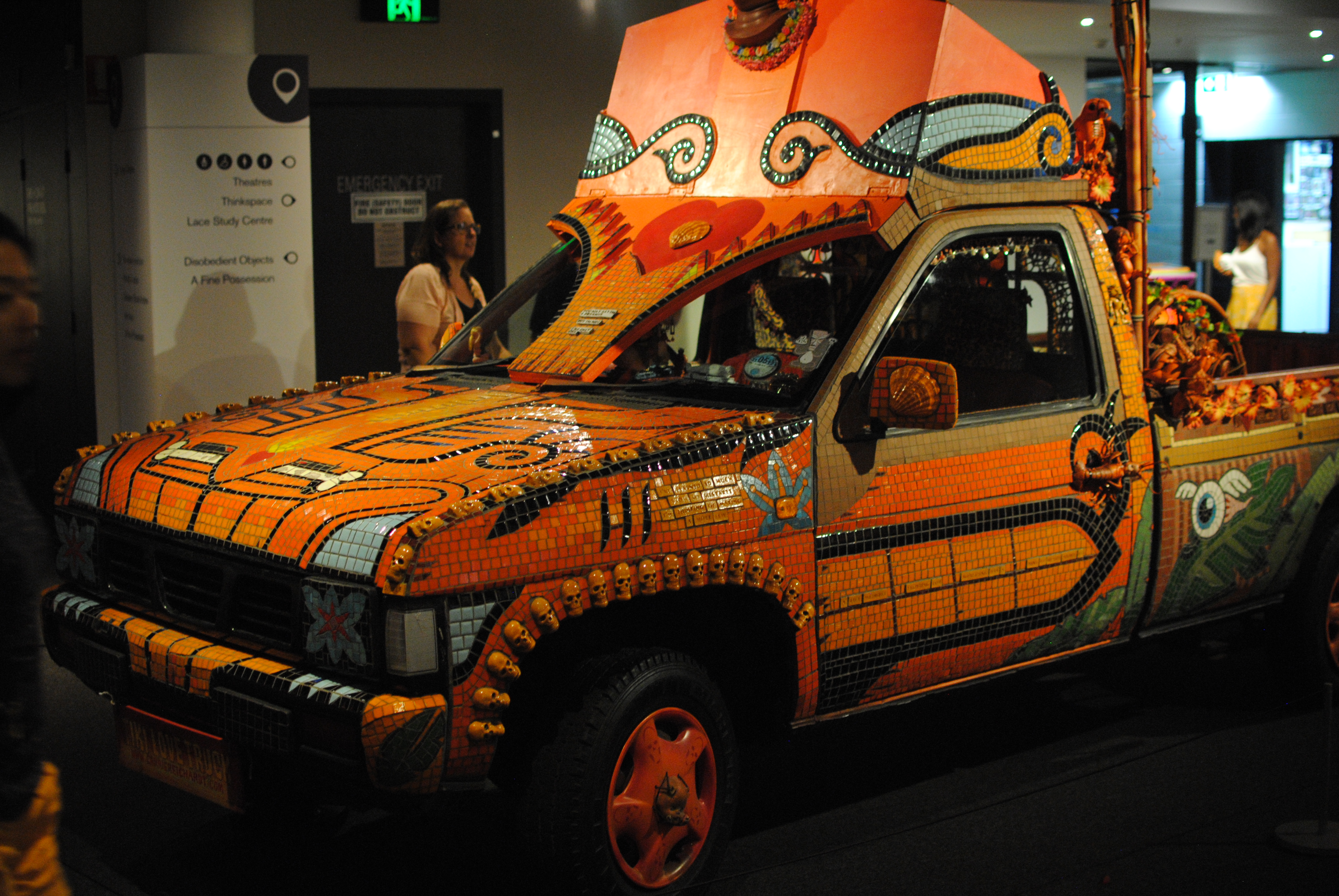
Decorated utility vehicle

Various exhibitions have paid tribute to Australian popular culture. Some of these have included On the box: great moments in Australian television 1956–2006 tribute to 50 years of Australian television and The 80s are back which looks back at life in Australia in the 1980s.

=== Arts ===
Arts oriented temporary exhibitions have included the Fabergé exhibition, the Treasures of Palestine exhibition, the Strictly Mardi Gras exhibition, the Christian Dior exhibition, the Audrey Hepburn exhibition, Kylie: an exhibition – a tribute to Kylie Minogue and her contribution to music, stage and screen, featuring many of her costumes. An exhibition about Diana, Princess of Wales, called Diana: a celebration included items from the collection at her ancestral home, Althorp, including her wedding gown, family jewellery and film of Diana as a child.

Harry Potter: The Exhibition in 2011–2012 was another popular exhibition, showcasing real costumes and sets from the eight Harry Potter films including the golden snitch, Nimbus 2000 and the Firebolt broomsticks, and various artefacts associated with all of the main characters.

In 2011, to celebrate the 20th anniversary of The Wiggles, the Powerhouse mounted The Wiggles Exhibition, which exhibited memorabilia from the group as well as from The Cockroaches, since two of the group were previously members of The Cockroaches. Due to its popularity, the exhibition was kept as one of the museum's permanent exhibitions.

=== Cinema-themed ===
Since 1988, the Powerhouse hosted a number of large temporary exhibitions, including ones based on popular cinema franchises such as Star Trek, The Lord of the Rings, and the Star Wars: Where Science Meets Imagination exhibition, showing models, props and costumes from all six Star Wars films, together with recent advances in technology that are turning fantasy into reality.

== See also ==
- German Museum of Technology – rail, maritime, aviation technology
- Musée des Arts et Métiers, Paris – scientific and cultural objects, collected since 18th century
- Museum of Science and Industry (Chicago) – transport (ships, trains, air, space)
- National Air and Space Museum, Washington, D.C.
