= Lisa Havilah =

Australian museum manager

CEO of Museum of Applied Arts & Sciences
- In office January 2019 – 27 August 2026
- Preceded by: Dolla Merrrillees
- Succeeded by: Abbie Galvin

Lisa Havilah is the CEO of the Museum of Applied Arts & Sciences (MAAS) in Sydney, Australia. She has previously directed various arts centres in Sydney, including Carriageworks and Campbelltown Arts Centre. She stood aside on 27 August 2026 amid a state government investigation into "governance and procurement practices" at the museum. NSW Government Architect Abbie Galvin took Havilah's place in an acting capacity.

== Early life and education ==
Havilah grew up on a dairy farm in Berry. She attended Bomaderry High, But was "disengaged and uninterested". She has said that her passion for art was influenced by her ceramicist mother. She studied painting and creative writing at art school. Due to her father's influence she also studied law, which she has said gave her "a different level of discipline".

== Career ==
At the age of 21, she and her then boyfriend, now husband, ceramicist Glenn Barkley, managed to find a space and get funding from a youth arts grant, Wollongong Council and BHP to initiate an artist-run gallery called Project Contemporary Artspace. They ran the gallery for four years, and it continues to operate independently today from a different location in Wollongong.

Havilah was Director of Campbelltown Arts Centre from 2005 to 2010, during which time visitor numbers to the centre increased from 30,000 to 190,000 per year, the highest attendance figures for a New South Wales cultural centre outside of metropolitan Sydney.

In 2011, Havilah was announced as the new CEO of Carriageworks. Havilah was responsible for the evolution of Carriageworks into a multi-arts venue, playing host to up to 100 projects a year which included contemporary theatre, dance, visual arts, music, film and fashion and hosting corporate events. During her time at Carriageworks, she created partnerships with major events such as Sydney Festival, Vivid Sydney, Australian Fashion Week and Sydney Contemporary, as well as expanding the program to include major food events, and visitor numbers grew from 110,000 in 2010, to 1.32 million in 2017.

In November 2018, she announced her resignation from Carriageworks to take up the role of CEO of the Museum of Applied Arts and Sciences (MAAS), starting in January 2019. She became the fourth head of MAAS in five and a half years, who reports to the Minister, manages 197 staff, and is responsible for the care of more than half a million artefacts of interest from a range of fields, including science, engineering, music and fashion. At the time, it was intended that the collections of the Powerhouse Museum (part of MAAS) would be moved in its entirety from its inner-city suburb of Ultimo to a new building in Parramatta. (However, after the move evoked much public controversy, on 4 July 2020 it was decided to keep and renovate the Ultimo building instead of demolishing it and relocating its collections, and build an additional venue in Parramatta with reduced floor space).

On 27 August 2026, Havilah stepped aside from her position as CEO of the Powerhouse, being replaced in the interim by NSW Government Architect Abbie Galvin. Her temporary departure comes amid a government investigation into "governance and procurement practices" at the museum.

== Other roles ==
In 2016, Havilah participated in the selection of Australia’s representation at the 2017 Venice Biennale and with the Commissioner led a delegation of Australian arts patrons to engage with the exhibition and Biennale programs.

In 2013, she was appointed to the ministerial reference group for the New South Wales Government's Arts and Cultural Policy Framework.

In May 2016, Havilah addressed the Currency House Creativity and Business Breakfast Series with a lecture titled "The Next Generation of Cultural Institution."

In 2017, she was part of an Australian Financial Review panel who selected "the top 10 people who wield the most cultural power in Australia".

Havilah has been a member of the City of Sydney's Public Art Advisory Panel, and of the Barangaroo Delivery Authority's Arts and Public Program Panel, which oversees the Barangaroo Public Art and Cultural Plan.

== Awards and honours ==
In 2013, FBi Radio awarded Havilah "SMAC (Sydney Music, Arts & Culture) of the Year," stating that she was "one of our city's most dynamic and hard-working cultural figures".

In 2016, while under Havilah's direction, Carriageworks was awarded the New South Wales Government's NSW Creative Laureate award, with NSW Industry, Resources and Energy Minister Anthony Roberts saying that under Havilah's leadership Carriageworks had “skilfully balanced commercial, entrepreneurial and artistic imperatives”.
