= Abbie Galvin =

Australian architect

- Born: Vancouver, British Columbia, Canada
- Occupation: Architect
- Children: 3
- Practice: New South Wales Government Architect
- Projects: The Braggs (2013), Royal North Shore Hospital (2012), Stockland head office (2007)

Abbie Galvin (born 1970) is the 24th NSW Government Architect. Formerly a Principal of Australian architecture, urban design and interior design practice BVN Architecture. She is a registered Architect in NSW, Victoria, ACT and SA and is also a member of the Australian Architecture Association.

== Early life and education ==
Born in Vancouver in 1970, Galvin, along with her parents and two younger brothers moved to the inner suburbs of Perth when she was 6 years old. Galvin's father is an architect and her mother is a nurse.

Growing up Galvin was constantly around a creative environment. "I grew up surrounded by Architecture, discussions around Architecture; Architecture books and magazines". This upbringing resulted in Galvin having a "very visual, aesthetic interest". Her childhood home was an old timber-framed house built by her father, often with the help of young Galvin and occasionally their neighbours.

Galvin attended John XXIII College, a private, co-education, catholic college. She studied traditional subjects at school such as French, Math, Chemistry, Physics, English Literature and Biology; she enjoyed all subjects, in particular Math and Literature.

Part of Galvin was determined to stray from following in her father's footsteps. For years she researched different professions; initially thinking she might study Physiotherapy or Chemistry. It wasn't until the end of her secondary education that she realised that Architecture was a culmination of many things she enjoyed and excelled at. Architecture was a profession that involved "problem solving..." whilst creating "...beauty at the same time".

After completion of high school Galvin commenced a Bachelor of Architecture at the University of Western Australia in 1988. Galvin learnt from a variety of different educators including Geoffrey London, Simon Anderson, Michael Markham, Charlie Mann, Peter Brew, Howard Raggatt and Ian McDougall. Two key influential figures outlined above were Geoffrey London and Simon Anderson they "...created an environment of complete experimentation". This environment exposed Galvin to various creative processes that are relative to problem solving aspects of architecture. Galvin graduated from the Bachelor of Architecture with honours in 1992 where she began her first job at Hames Sharley.

== Personal life ==
In Galvin's spare time she enjoys the company of her husband, also an architect, and three children. She enjoys knitting, sewing and weaving. Galvin became interested in weaving after a trip through Scandinavia and has since completed a weaving course under Liz Williamson. Galvin enjoys running; last year she completed a marathon in Uluru and is currently training to complete another one later this year.

== Career ==
=== Early career ===
After years of working for small architectural practices, Galvin contacted the Museum of Sydney in regards to an opportunity about developing a public program focusing on architecture. Inspired by the Chicago Open, Galvin organised and co-ordinated the Sydney Open, which was first presented by Sydney Living Museums in 1997. Throughout her working career Galvin has been a dedicated contributor to an accreditation panel through the Australian Institute of Architecture, her role consisting of monitoring and accessing university courses. Galvin occasionally lectures and is a regularly a guest critic for students. She has been on the judging panel alongside Richard Hassell, Sean Godsell and Peter Corrigan for the inaugural ALVA student architecture competition at the University of Western Australia.

=== BVN ===
Abbie joined BVN Architecture in the mid-1990s and rose to the position of principal, an owner of the practice. She worked on large-scale projects ranging from hospitals, multi-residential housing, and research buildings. Galvin communicates her designs through narrative proposals to gain a client's understanding of complex building designs.

=== New South Wales Government Architect ===
Galvin was appointed the 24th New South Wales Government Architect on 1 October 2019, the first female in the role's 200-year history.

On 27 August 2026 it was announced that Galvin would become interim Chief Executive of Powerhouse Parramatta overseeing the project's completion only months before its anticipated opening. She replaced Chief Executive Officer Lisa Havilah who was stood down pending investigations into governance and procurement issues.

== Influences ==
Galvin's architecture is influenced by numerous sources. This includes early modernists such as Le Corbusier and Atelier 5; all seven volumes of Corbusier's Oeuvre and Atelier 5 publications were kept in the family's bookshelf and frequented by her father as a point of reference. Furthermore, Galvin finds architects who work in primitive locations influential as there is a focus on vernacular design. She believes architecture should not form a recognisable object for self-promotion; architecture should be subjective to a specific site.

Architecture can never do that in isolation, it has to work in tandem. But so often the building is seen as this skin that is independent of what goes on inside it. It's not just about form making. It is definitely about the integrity and authenticity of architecture.

== Projects ==
Building/project	Location	Country	Date
The Braggs, University of Adelaide	Adelaide, SA	Australia	2013
Royal North Shore Hospital	St Leonards, Sydney, NSW	Australia	2012
Monash University Student Housing	Clayton, Melbourne, VIC	Australia	2011
HMAS Creswell Griffiths House	Jervis Bay, NSW	Australia	2011
Stockland's Head Office	Sydney CBD, NSW	Australia	2007
Deutsche Bank	Sydney CBD, NSW	Australia	2005

=== Stockland's head office, 2007 ===
Abbie Galvin was the leading architect of Stockland's new head office. This building is a redevelopment of an existing 1980s office block; it became Australia's first rated 6 Star Green Energy Efficient office (Office Interiors v1.1 building). Winning seven awards in total that included the BPN Environ Sustainability Award for Office Fit Out (2008) and Wirtschafts Woche 2008 Best Office Award (Cologne, Germany). Key to the design is the centralised eight-storey atrium.

Galvin worked closely with the needs of the manager director of Stockland and his executive team; the development company was going through significant change at the time and needed a space to allow maximum work efficiency. The design challenge was working with the eight levels of the existing structure. Galvin and her team suggested the use of voids that would create visual allowances between the staggered levels and structural bays, these voids then creating a sense of altering scales in verticality. The centralised stairs stringers are painted red to symbolise Enid Blyton's red slippery-dip in the children's novel The Folk and the Faraway Tree.

=== Royal North Shore Hospital, 2012 ===
In 2009 Abbie gained further recognition in the Australian Architecture Institution after being involved in one of the largest projects undertaken by BVN. This was the $1 billion redevelopment of Sydney's Royal North Shore Hospital, and the redesign of the HMAS Creswell training college located in Jervis Bay.

=== The Braggs, 2013 ===
Another notable project Galvin was involved in was the research Institute for Photonic and Advanced Sensing (IPAS) building at the University of Adelaide, otherwise known as 'The Braggs'. The underpinning design idea was to reflect the purpose of the building in the form and planning. For instance, the folded glass façade at each level represents a different wavelength of light.

== Career achievements ==
Galvin has won numerous design competitions at the University of Western Australia including the RAIA Travel Grant for Design Excellence. Galvin's reputation in architecture has been steadily increasing, she has been featured in the Architecture Bulletin discussing gender equality in the Australian architecture industry. In the article she admits that there must be change in the industry; stating that current industry practices "...make it extremely difficult for women who are attempting to balance a career and children, and it is not until these issues are addressed that we will see higher levels of female representation and retention". (Architecture Bulletin Sep/Oct 2012, p16). In addition, Galvin has contributed in newspaper publications such as The Australian Financial Review and The Sydney Morning Herald.

== Awards ==
- 2006: Deutsche Bank is awarded RAIA National Award Interior Architecture, RAIA NSW Interior Architecture Award
- 2007: Stockland Head Office is awarded MBA NSW Interior Fit-outs $25m+
- 2008: Milo Dunphy Award for Sustainable Architecture at the NSW Architecture Awards.
- 2008: Stockland Head office is awarded RAIA NSW Milo Dunphy Award for Sustainable Architecture, Environ BPN Sustainability Award, IDEA08 Best Commercial Interior, IDEA08 Best Sustainability Interior, Property Council of Australian Office Developments Finalist, Property Council of Australian Sustainable Developments Finalist, RAIA NSW Interior Architecture Commendation, Winner of BOSS Space Awards, Wirtschaftswoche Best Office 2008 International Category
- 2009: Galvin was nominated by Micky Pinkerton (Suters Architects) for IDEA (Interior Design Excellence Awards) designer of the year 2009
- 2013: The Braggs building is awarded The Jack McConnell Award for Public Architecture (BVN Media Release 2013, Braggs Wins Top Architecture Award in SA)
