= Kevin Glendinning =

English footballer

Personal information
- Full name: Kevin Glendinning
- Date of birth: 23 January 1962
- Place of birth: Corbridge, England
- Position: Left back

Youth career
- Darlington

Senior career*
Years	Team	Apps	(Gls)
1980–1981	Darlington	4	(0)
- * Club domestic league appearances and goals

Kevin Glendinning (born 23 January 1962) is an English former footballer who played as a left back in the Football League for Darlington.
