= Lionel Glendenning =

Lionel William Augustus Glendenning, B.Arch., M.Arch.(Harvard) (1941-2025) was an Australian architect.

== Career ==
In 1959, Glendenning was appointed architectural draftsman with the (NSW) Department of Public Works, and promoted to architect in 1967.

Glendenning was 1968 Harvard Menzies Scholar.

Glendenning was the architect behind the Powerhouse Museum.
