= S. Gail Glendinning =

American plasma physicist

Sharon Gail Glendinning is an American experimental physicist.

Glendinning completed her bachelor degree in experimental physics at Middlebury College in 1973, and graduated from Duke University seven years later with a doctorate in the same field of study. She published the dissertation Elastic and Inelastic Neutron Scattering Cross Sections for ^{10}B, ^{11}B, and ^{16}O. Glendinning remained at Duke to conduct postdoctoral research, and subsequently worked for General Electric within the nuclear fuels division. In 1985, she joined the inertial confinement fusion program at Lawrence Livermore National Laboratory (LLNL). Glendinning received the John Dawson Award for Excellence in Plasma Physics Research from the American Physical Society in 1995. Three years later, the APS elected her a fellow, "[f]or clear and illuminating experimental investigations of ablation-front Rayleigh-Taylor instability, laser imprinting, and nonlinear hydrodynamic instabilities relevant to inertial confinement fusion, high energy-density physics and astrophysics." Glendinning retired from LLNL after 2020.
