= Powerhouse Parramatta =

- View of Powerhouse Parrmatta

- Parramatta Powerhouse
- Established: 7 November 2026
- Location: Parramatta, Sydney
- Coordinates: 33.812051°S 151.006082496°E
- Type: Technology museum
- Architects: Moreau Kusunoki and Genton
- Owner: Government of New South Wales
- Website: powerhouse.com.au/visit/parramatta

Powerhouse Parramatta is a museum in Parramatta, New South Wales, that opened on 7 November 2026. It has been described as the "most significant cultural infrastructure project since the Sydney Opera House." It is the newest of the four Powerhouse Museums in Greater Sydney, alongside Powerhouse Ultimo, Powerhouse Castle Hill, and the Sydney Observatory. Most of the museum's exhibitions are free.

Powerhouse Parramatta is the largest museum in New South Wales and the first major cultural institution in Western Sydney. There was controversy around the cost of construction, at $915 million, as well as environmental and heritage concerns. Upon opening in 2026, the museum's critical reception was mixed, with praise for the diversity in its exhibitions. Commentators suggested that the controversy surrounding its development could diminish if it became a widely embraced cultural destination.

== History ==
In July 2020, the Government of New South Wales confirmed that the Powerhouse Museum would retain its Ultimo location while also proceeding with the development of a new building in Parramatta. This dual-site approach aimed to expand cultural access across Greater Sydney, drawing comparisons to multi-site institutions like the Smithsonian, although art critic Christopher Allen, who along with critic John McDonald was "pointedly" not invivited to the opening, called such a comparison "grossly and embarrassingly inaccurate".

Construction of Powerhouse Parramatta commenced in 2022, following the completion of design development and planning phases in 2020 and 2021. Lendlease was appointed as the main construction partner. Art critic John McDonald criticised the expensive hiring of "Artistic Associates" while an astronomy and space curator at the Powerhouse for almost twelve years has resigned. The $915 million project finished construction in 2026.

=== Willow Grove controversy ===
The site the government selected for the museum was Willow Grove, an 1890s villa that needed to be demolished to build the site. In November 2020, the NSW arm of the Construction, Forestry and Maritime Employees Union, as well as the New South Wales Nurses and Midwives' Association, placed green bans on Willow Grove to prevent demolition. The site was also significant to the local Dharug people, who expressed dismay at the construction. A deal was reached in August 2020 to disassemble the villa and reassemble it at a new location, however this never happened and the rebuild was abandoned in September 2023. The group that led the protest to save Willow Grove welcomed this decision, stating "sanity has prevailed, no Willow Grove Frankenstein will be resurrected".

== Architecture ==
Parramatta Powerhouse was designed by French–Japanese practice Moreau Kusunoki and Australian firm Genton. The museum features over 18,000 square metres (190,000 sq ft) of exhibition and public space, including seven expansive, column-free galleries, a 600-seat theatre, rooftop gardens, and dedicated learning studios.

Architectural reviews of the building were largely positive. I has been praised the 12,000-tonne steel lattice exoskeleton for balancing the monumentality with a "relatable human scale". While the buildings natural light, river views, interior walls rendered with 600,000 crushed oyster shells have also been praised, as has its sustainability credential as the first Australian public building to achieve a 6 Star Green Star Designed rating and its dedication of two-thirds of the site to landscaped public space.

It is situated on the banks of the Parramatta River. The design of the museum incorporates various flood mitigation strategies. The building's ground floor is elevated to remain above a 1-in-1000-year flood level, and an undercroft space allows floodwaters to pass through without impacting the main structure. Christopher Allen compared it to "one of those oversized Gulf state airports, only without all the shiny surfaces and artificial waterfalls [with] a lot of bare concrete walls and floors, a sterile and unwelcoming environment." John McDonald described the building as a "big, clean, spacious box ... [a] Disneyfied fun palace on the banks of the Parramatta River". He also notes that the central purpose of the Powerhouse, exhibiting science and technology, has been subverted by replacing historians, scientists and specialised curators by questionable artists. The building consists of two main towers, one dedicated to free exhibitions, the other requiring entrance fees. The free tower has a roof garden with an plaque acknowledging the Aboriginal Australian Daniel Moowattin who assisted in collecting botanical specimens and was convicted of the rape of a 15-year-old girl and executed, which is not mentioned on the plaque.

== Opening ==
Powerhouse Parramatta opened on 7 November 2026 with an accompanying $4.5 million, 23-day opening festival featuring 179 events, including talks by Australian astronaut Katherine Bennell-Pegg, science-fiction author Ted Chiang, designer Marc Newson, culinary figures Maggie Beer, Asma Khan and Stephanie Alexander, alongside performances, music, screenings and workshops. Sixty-five percent of the program was free to attend, with over half of the more than 1,200 collaborators drawn from Western Sydney.

The museum opened with four free and two paid exhibition: The Mall, co-created with architecture firm Office for Metropolitan Architecture (OMA/AMO) to examine the design and cultural history of shopping centres. Overflow, a First Nations-led water installation created in collaboration with film maker Ivan Sen. Es Devlin: The Turning, the artists Australian debut, comprising five participatory commissions across sculpture, film, 3D-landscapes, and collaborative drawing. The Dark, a children's exhibition housed inside a 22-metre replica meteorite. The fifth and largest exhibition, Task Eternal, was ticketed $30 for adults and free for visitors under 16 years old. The exhibition explores aviation and space exploration through over 850 objects, including a NASA moon rock, suspended aircraft; and a ticketed ($10) James Turrell installation, Shangri-La.

Writing in Wallpaper, Kate Goodwin praised the inaugural exhibitions, identifying Task Eternal as a stand-out describing the new artistic commission as offering valuable critical perspectives.

== External link ==
- Media related to Powerhouse Museum at Wikimedia Commons
- Official website
